= 1982 Sydney City FC season =

Sydney City
1982 season
- Head Coach: Eddie Thomson
- Stadium: ES Marks Athletics Field
- National Soccer League: 1st
- NSL Cup: Quarter-finals
- Charity Shield: Winners
- Top goalscorer: League: John Kosmina (22); All: John Kosmina (26)
- Highest home attendance: 5,600 vs. Sydney Olympic (13 June 1982); National Soccer League
- Lowest home attendance: 700 vs. Footscray JUST (4 April 1982); National Soccer League
- Average home league attendance: 2,240
- Biggest win: 5–0 vs. Preston Makedonia (A) (6 June 1982); National Soccer League; 6–1 vs. Adelaide City (H) (15 August 1982); National Soccer League
- Biggest defeat: 0–2 vs. Sydney City (A) (12 April 1982); National Soccer League
Home colours	Away colours

The 1982 season was the sixth in the National Soccer League for Sydney City Football Club (now Hakoah Sydney City East). In addition to the domestic league, they also participated in the NSL Cup. Sydney City finished 1st in their National Soccer League season, were eliminated in the quarter-finals of the NSL Cup, and won the Charity Shield.

== Players ==
Note: Flags indicate national team as defined under FIFA eligibility rules; some limited exceptions apply. Players may hold more than one non-FIFA nationality.

No.	Pos.	Nation	Player
—	GK	AUS	Glenn Ahearn
—	MF	AUS	Murray Barnes
—	MF	AUS	Ken Boden
—	FW	BRA	Nelio Borges
—	DF	SCO	Ian Bruce
—	MF	AUS	Jimmy Cant
—	GK	AUS	Todd Clarke
—	FW	AUS	Graeme Fletcher
—	DF	CRC	Gerry Gomez
—	DF	AUS	Warren Haslam
—	FW	AUS	John Kosmina

No.	Pos.	Nation	Player
—	MF	AUS	Grant Lee
—	FW	AUS	Dave Mitchell
—	DF	AUS	Kevin Mullen
—	FW	SCO	Willie Murray
—	DF	AUS	Steve O'Connor
—	MF	AUS	Jim Patikas
—	DF	SCO	Alex Robertson
—	MF	AUS	Ian Souness
—	DF	AUS	John Spanos
—	MF	AUS	Joe Watson

== Competitions ==
=== Overall record ===
Competition	First match	Last match	Starting round	Final position	Record							
Competition	First match	Last match	Starting round	Final position	Pld	W	D	L	GF	GA	GD	Win %
National Soccer League	14 February 1982	5 September 1982	Matchday 1	1st	30	20	5	5	68	28	+40	66.67
NSL Cup	14 June 1982	14 July 1982	First round	Quarter-finals	2	1	0	1	5	2	+3	50.00
Charity Shield	31 January 1982		Final	Winners	1	1	0	0	3	1	+2	100.00
Total					33	22	5	6	76	31	+45	66.67

Source: Competitions

=== National Soccer League ===
==== League table ====
Pos	Team	Pld	W	D	L	GF	GA	GD	Pts	Relegation
1	Sydney City (C)	30	20	5	5	68	28	+40	45	Qualification to Finals series (Note: The Finals series was not considered the championship for the 1982 National Soccer League.)
2	St George-Budapest	30	14	8	8	47	40	+7	36	Qualification to Finals series
3	Wollongong City	30	16	3	11	43	46	−3	35	Qualification to Finals series
4	Heidelberg United	30	13	8	9	42	37	+5	34	Qualification to Finals series
5	Preston Makedonia	30	12	10	8	45	41	+4	34	
6	South Melbourne	30	11	9	10	46	37	+9	31	
7	APIA Leichhardt	30	12	7	11	49	54	−5	31	
8	Sydney Olympic	30	12	6	12	52	42	+10	30	
9	West Adelaide	30	10	8	12	44	40	+4	28	
10	Marconi Fairfield	30	12	4	14	44	43	+1	28	
11	Brisbane Lions	30	10	8	12	39	42	−3	28	
12	Newcastle KB United	30	10	7	13	43	52	−9	27	
13	Adelaide City	30	6	12	12	36	44	−8	24	
14	Footscray JUST	30	5	14	11	34	46	−12	24	
15	Canberra City	30	7	10	13	37	54	−17	24	
16	Brisbane City	30	5	11	14	32	55	−23	21	

Source: rsssf.com
Rules for classification: 1) points; 2) goal difference; 3) number of goals scored.
(C) Champions

==== Results summary ====
Overall								Home						Away					
Pld	W	D	L	GF	GA	GD	Pts	W	D	L	GF	GA	GD	W	D	L	GF	GA	GD
30	20	5	5	68	28	+40	65	11	2	2	41	15	+26	9	3	3	27	13	+14

Source: worldfootball.net

==== Results by round ====
Round	1	2	3	4	5	6	7	8	9	10	11	12	13	14	15	16	17	18	19	20	21	22	23	24	25	26	27	28	29	30
Ground	H	A	H	A	A	H	A	H	A	H	A	H	A	H	A	H	A	H	A	A	H	A	H	A	H	A	H	A	H	H
Result	D	W	W	W	W	L	L	W	L	W	L	W	D	W	W	D	W	W	D	W	W	W	W	D	L	W	W	W	W	W
Position	7	4	3	2	2	2	5	3	4	3	5	3	4	3	1	2	1	1	1	1	1	1	1	1	1	1	1	1	1	1
Points	1	3	5	7	9	9	9	11	11	13	13	15	16	18	20	21	23	25	26	28	30	32	34	35	35	37	39	41	43	45

Source: worldfootball.net
A = Away; H = Home; W = Win; D = Draw; L = Loss

==== Matches ====
Win Draw Loss

14 February 1982 1	Sydney City	1–1	Preston Makedonia	Sydney
	Bruce 2'	Report	Brown 32'	Stadium: St George Stadium; Attendance: 1,480; Referee: Peter Rampley

21 February 1982 2	Wollongong City	1–3	Sydney City	Wollongong
	O'Connor 25'	Report	Patikas 5', 76'; Kosmina 86'	Stadium: Wollongong Showground; Attendance: 4,000; Referee: Ken Small

28 February 1982 3	Sydney City	2–1	South Melbourne	Sydney
	Boden 7'; Spanos 85'	Report	Campbell 6'	Stadium: St George Stadium; Attendance: 3,700; Referee: Tim Davies

7 March 1982 4	Sydney Olympic	1–2	Sydney City	Sydney
	Koussas 14'	Report	Murray 46'; Kosmina 51'	Stadium: Lambert Park; Attendance: 5,706; Referee: Doug Rennie

14 March 1982 5	West Adelaide	0–2	Sydney City	Adelaide
		Report	Kosmina 55'; Cant 60'	Stadium: Hindmarsh Stadium; Attendance: 4,230; Referee: Ken Allen

21 March 1982 6	Sydney City	0–1	APIA Leichhardt	Sydney
		Report	Soper 85'	Stadium: ES Marks Athletics Field; Attendance: 3,560; Referee: Peter Rampley

28 March 1982 7	Brisbane City	2–1	Sydney City	Brisbane
	Palinkas 60'; Bohan 75'	Report	Patikas 68'	Stadium: Spencer Park; Attendance: 2,600; Referee: Jim Reeves

4 April 1982 8	Sydney City	1–0	Footscray JUST	Sydney
	Kosmina 85'	Report		Stadium: ES Marks Athletics Field; Attendance: 700; Referee: Tony Boskovic

12 April 1982 9	Canberra City	2–0	Sydney City	Canberra
	Maclaren 60'; Cant 81' (o.g.)	Report		Stadium: Bruce Stadium; Attendance: 3,100; Referee: Dave Nugent

18 April 1982 10	Sydney City	4–0	Newcastle KB United	Sydney
	Patikas 25', 72'; Murray 56'; Fletcher 78'	Report		Stadium: ES Marks Athletics Field; Attendance: 1,463; Referee: Tim Davies

25 April 1982 11	Heidelberg United	1–0	Sydney City	Melbourne
	Yzendoorn 77'	Report		Stadium: Olympic Village; Attendance: 3,500; Referee: Jack Johnston

2 May 1982 12	Sydney City	3–1	St George-Budapest	Sydney
	Kosmina 2', 26' (pen.), 51'	Report	Duarte 76'	Stadium: ES Marks Athletics Field; Attendance: 2,781; Referee: Gary Power

9 May 1982 13	Adelaide City	0–0	Sydney City	Adelaide
		Report		Stadium: Olympic Sports Field; Attendance: 3,600; Referee: Stewart Mellings

16 May 1982 14	Sydney City	3–1	Marconi Fairfield	Sydney
	Kosmina 28', 30', 58' (pen.)	Report	Henderson 73'	Stadium: ES Marks Athletics Field; Attendance: 4,028; Referee: Tim Davies

23 May 1982 15	Brisbane Lions	0–1	Sydney City	Brisbane
		Report	Bennett 66' (o.g.)	Stadium: Richlands Stadium; Attendance: 1,800; Referee: Bob Mee

30 May 1982 16	Sydney City	3–3	Wollongong City	Sydney
	Murray 12'; Borges 22'; Mitchell 74'	Report		Stadium: ES Marks Athletics Field; Attendance: 2,824; Referee: Richard Lorenc

6 June 1982 17	Preston Makedonia	0–5	Sydney City	Melbourne
		Report	Barnes 13'; Murray 30'; Kosmina 65', 88'; Spanos 79'	Stadium: B.T. Connor Reserve; Attendance: 4,150; Referee: Don Campbell

13 June 1982 18	Sydney City	2–1	Sydney Olympic	Sydney
	Mitchell 4'; Murray 45'	Report	K. Wilson 47'	Stadium: ES Marks Athletics Field; Attendance: 5,600; Referee: Peter Rampley

20 June 1982 19	South Melbourne	2–2	Sydney City	Melbourne
	Buljevic 61'; Egan 78'	Report	Spanos 63'; Borges 65'	Stadium: Middle Park Soccer Stadium; Attendance: 4,000; Referee: Jack Johnston

27 June 1982 20	APIA Leichhardt	1–4	Sydney City	Sydney
	Giampaolo 21' (pen.)	Report	Patikas 47'; Murray ?'; Spanos 71'; Mitchell 75'	Stadium: Lambert Park; Attendance: 5,428; Referee: Richard Lorenc

4 July 1982 21	Sydney City	5–2	Brisbane City	Sydney
	Patikas 10'; Kosmina 39' (pen.), 51', 61' (pen.), 79'	Report	Bohan 43'; Palinkas 51'	Stadium: ES Marks Athletics Field; Attendance: 1,018; Referee: Doug Rennie

11 July 1982 22	Footscray JUST	0–2	Sydney City	Melbourne
		Report	Borges 42', 46'	Stadium: Schintler Reserve; Attendance: 1,600; Referee: Evan Venios

18 July 1982 23	Sydney City	3–0	Canberra City	Sydney
	Barnes 7'; Mitchell 23'; Borges 72'	Report		Stadium: ES Marks Athletics Field; Attendance: 1,450; Referee: Rob Davies

24 July 1982 24	Newcastle KB United	2–2	Sydney City	Newcastle
15:00 AEST	Lowe 7'; Tredinnick 42'	Report	Kosmina 50' (pen.); Boden 67'	Stadium: Newcastle International Sports Centre; Attendance: 2,664; Referee: Dave Nugent

1 August 1982 25	Sydney City	0–1	Heidelberg United	Sydney
		Report	Cole 59'	Stadium: ES Marks Athletics Field; Attendance: 1,635; Referee: Peter Rampley

8 August 1982 26	St George-Budapest	0–1	Sydney City	Sydney
		Report	Barnes 13'	Stadium: St George Stadium; Attendance: 5,120; Referee: Tim Davies

15 August 1982 27	Sydney City	6–1	Adelaide City	Sydney
	Patikas 10', 21'; Mitchell 25', 54'; Kosmina 40'; Boden 82'	Report	Carter 62'	Stadium: ES Marks Athletics Field; Attendance: 1,158; Referee: Richard Lorenc

22 August 1982 28	Marconi Fairfield	1–2	Sydney City	Sydney
	Silva 81'	Report	Kosmina 20'; Boden 73'	Stadium: Marconi Stadium; Attendance: 3,046; Referee: Peter Rampley

29 August 1982 29	Sydney City	3–0	Brisbane Lions	Sydney
	Lee 7'; Borges 54'; Watson 78'	Report		Stadium: ES Marks Athletics Field; Attendance: 1,092; Referee: Rob Davies

5 September 1982 30	Sydney City	5–2	West Adelaide	Sydney
	Kosmina 4', 45', 80'; Watson 53'; Borges 84'	Report	Manecas 26'; Atsalas 70'	Stadium: ES Marks Athletics Field; Attendance: 1,115; Referee: Richard Lorenc

=== NSL Cup ===
14 June 1982 First round	Wollongong City	1–5	Sydney City	Wollongong
	O'Connor 26'	Report	Kosmina 29', 88'; Lee 50', 80'; Borges 65'	Stadium: Memorial Park; Attendance: 500; Referee: Doug Rennie

14 July 1982 Quarter-finals	Brisbane Lions	1–0	Sydney City	Brisbane
	Hogg 42'	Report		Stadium: Perry Park; Attendance: 1,000; Referee: Col Amos

=== Charity Shield ===
31 January 1982	Sydney City	3–1	Brisbane Lions	Brisbane
	Bennett 34' (o.g.); Kosmina 51', 72'	Report	Burns 75'	Stadium: Richlands Stadium; Attendance: 1,000~; Referee: Dave Nugent

== Statistics ==
=== Appearances and goals ===
Includes all competitions. Players with no appearances not included in the list.

No.	Pos	Nat	Player	Total		National Soccer League		NSL Cup		Charity Shield	
No.	Pos	Nat	Player	Apps	Goals	Apps	Goals	Apps	Goals	Apps	Goals
	GK	(Australia) AUS	Glenn Ahearn	2	0	1	0	1	0	0	0
	MF	(Australia) AUS	Murray Barnes	23	3	19+2	3	1	0	1	0
	MF	(Australia) AUS	Ken Boden	11	4	4+6	4	1	0	0	0
	FW	(Brazil) BRA	Nelio Borges	21	7	18+2	6	1	1	0	0
	DF	(Scotland) SCO	Ian Bruce	23	1	20	1	2	0	1	0
	MF	(Australia) AUS	Jimmy Cant	32	1	27+2	1	2	0	1	0
	GK	(Australia) AUS	Todd Clarke	31	0	29	0	1	0	1	0
	FW	(Australia) AUS	Graeme Fletcher	2	1	0+2	1	0	0	0	0
	DF	(Costa Rica) CRC	Gerry Gomez	1	0	0+1	0	0	0	0	0
	DF	(Australia) AUS	Warren Haslam	1	0	1	0	0	0	0	0
	FW	(Australia) AUS	John Kosmina	31	26	28	22	2	2	1	2
	MF	(Australia) AUS	Grant Lee	4	3	1+1	1	2	2	0	0
	FW	(Australia) AUS	Dave Mitchell	21	6	20	6	1	0	0	0
	DF	(Australia) AUS	Kevin Mullen	23	0	18+3	0	1	0	0+1	0
	MF	(Australia) AUS	Agenor Muniz	1	0	0	0	1	0	0	0
	FW	(Scotland) SCO	Willie Murray	18	6	14+3	6	0	0	1	0
	DF	(Australia) AUS	Steve O'Connor	25	0	23	0	1	0	1	0
	MF	(Australia) AUS	Jim Patikas	25	10	23+1	10	1	0	0	0
	DF	(Scotland) SCO	Alex Robertson	31	0	29	0	1	0	1	0
	MF	(Australia) AUS	Ian Souness	5	0	4	0	0	0	1	0
	DF	(Australia) AUS	John Spanos	28	4	25+1	4	1	0	1	0
	MF	(Australia) AUS	Joe Watson	32	2	26+3	2	2	0	1	0

=== Disciplinary record ===
Includes all competitions. The list is sorted by squad number when total cards are equal. Players with no cards not included in the list.

No.	Pos	Nat	Player	Total			National Soccer League			NSL Cup			Charity Shield		
No.	Pos	Nat	Player	Yellow card	Second yellow card	Red card	Yellow card	Second yellow card	Red card	Yellow card	Second yellow card	Red card	Yellow card	Second yellow card	Red card
	DF	(Australia) AUS	Steve O'Connor	6	0	1	6	0	1	0	0	0	0	0	0
	FW	(Australia) AUS	John Kosmina	4	0	1	4	0	1	0	0	0	0	0	0
	MF	(Australia) AUS	Ian Souness	2	0	1	2	0	1	0	0	0	0	0	0
	FW	(Australia) AUS	Dave Mitchell	0	0	1	0	0	1	0	0	0	0	0	0
	DF	(Scotland) SCO	Alex Robertson	0	0	1	0	0	1	0	0	0	0	0	0
	DF	(Australia) AUS	Kevin Mullen	5	0	0	5	0	0	0	0	0	0	0	0
	MF	(Australia) AUS	Joe Watson	4	0	0	4	0	0	0	0	0	0	0	0
	MF	(Australia) AUS	Murray Barnes	3	0	0	3	0	0	0	0	0	0	0	0
	FW	(Brazil) BRA	Nelio Borges	1	0	0	1	0	0	0	0	0	0	0	0
	DF	(Scotland) SCO	Ian Bruce	1	0	0	0	0	0	0	0	0	1	0	0
	MF	(Australia) AUS	Jimmy Cant	1	0	0	1	0	0	0	0	0	0	0	0
	FW	(Scotland) SCO	Willie Murray	1	0	0	1	0	0	0	0	0	0	0	0
	MF	(Australia) AUS	Jim Patikas	1	0	0	1	0	0	0	0	0	0	0	0
	DF	(Australia) AUS	John Spanos	1	0	0	1	0	0	0	0	0	0	0	0

- (yellow card) = Number of bookings; (second yellow card) = Number of sending offs after a second yellow card; (red card) = Number of sending offs by a direct red card.
