= 1981 Sydney City FC season =

Sydney City
1981 season
- Head Coach: Eddie Thomson
- Stadium: Sydney Sports Ground; St George Stadium; ES Marks Athletics Field
- National Soccer League: 1st
- NSL Cup: Third round
- Top goalscorer: League: Ken Boden; Ian Souness (12 each); All: Ken Boden (18)
- Highest home attendance: 6,892 vs. Sydney Olympic (5 July 1981); National Soccer League
- Lowest home attendance: 1,200 vs. West Adelaide (1 March 1981); National Soccer League
- Average home league attendance: 2,602
- Biggest win: 5–0 vs. Marconi Fairfield (H) (15 March 1981); National Soccer League; 5–0 vs. Wollongong Wolves (A) (23 August 1981); National Soccer League
- Biggest defeat: 1–3 vs. Marconi Fairfield (N) (30 January 1981); Charity Shield; 0–2 vs. Canberra City (A) (7 March 1981); National Soccer League; 0–2 vs. Brisbane City (A) (7 June 1981); National Soccer League

The 1981 season was the fifth in the National Soccer League for Sydney City (Hakoah Sydney City East Football Club). In addition to the domestic league, they also participated in the NSL Cup. Sydney City finished 1st in their National Soccer League season, and were eliminated in the third round of the NSL Cup.

== Players ==
Note: Flags indicate national team as defined under FIFA eligibility rules; some limited exceptions apply. Players may hold more than one non-FIFA nationality.

No.	Pos.	Nation	Player
1	GK	AUS	Todd Clarke
2	DF	AUS	Kevin Mullen
3	DF	AUS	John Spanos
4	DF	AUS	Steve O'Connor
5	DF	SCO	Ian Bruce
6	FW	SCO	Willie Murray
7	MF	AUS	Joe Watson
8	MF	AUS	Murray Barnes
9	MF	AUS	Ken Boden
10	FW	AUS	John Kosmina

No.	Pos.	Nation	Player
11	FW	BRA	Hilton Silva
12	MF	AUS	Jimmy Cant
14	DF	CRC	Gerry Gomez
16	MF	AUS	Jim Patikas
18	MF	AUS	Ian Souness
20	GK	AUS	Tony Pezzano
21	MF	AUS	Grant Lee
—	MF	AUS	Agenor Muniz
—	DF	SCO	Alex Robertson

== Competitions ==
=== Overall record ===
Competition	First match	Last match	Starting round	Final position	Record							
Competition	First match	Last match	Starting round	Final position	Pld	W	D	L	GF	GA	GD	Win %
National Soccer League	15 February 1981	13 September 1981	Matchday 1	1st	30	19	5	6	59	30	+29	63.33
NSL Cup	22 March 1981	27 May 1981	First round	Third round	3	2	1	0	6	2	+4	66.67
Charity Shield	30 January 1981		Final	Runners-up	1	0	0	1	1	3	−2	0.00
Total					34	21	6	7	66	35	+31	61.76

Source: Competitions

=== National Soccer League ===
==== League table ====
Pos	Team	Pld	W	D	L	GF	GA	GD	Pts	Relegation
1	Sydney City (C)	30	19	5	6	59	30	+29	43	
2	South Melbourne	30	13	13	4	41	27	+14	39	
3	Brisbane City	30	12	11	7	37	25	+12	35	
4	APIA Leichhardt	30	12	11	7	39	33	+6	35	
5	Canberra City	30	13	7	10	41	32	+9	33	
6	Brisbane Lions	30	11	11	8	41	33	+8	33	
7	Adelaide City	30	13	6	11	46	42	+4	32	
8	Heidelberg United	30	12	7	11	48	40	+8	31	
9	Sydney Olympic	30	11	9	10	46	46	0	31	
10	Newcastle KB United	30	11	8	11	41	41	0	30	
11	Wollongong City	30	8	12	10	35	39	−4	28	
12	Preston Makedonia	30	9	7	14	39	41	−2	25	
13	Footscray JUST	30	9	7	14	32	48	−16	25	
14	Marconi Fairfield	30	9	7	14	23	45	−22	25	
15	Blacktown City (R)	30	6	9	15	32	47	−15	21	Relegated to the 1982 NSW State League
16	West Adelaide	30	5	4	21	26	57	−31	14	

Updated to match(es) played on unknown. Source: rsssf.com
Rules for classification: 1) points; 2) goal difference; 3) number of goals scored.
(C) Champions; (R) Relegated

==== Results summary ====
Overall								Home						Away					
Pld	W	D	L	GF	GA	GD	Pts	W	D	L	GF	GA	GD	W	D	L	GF	GA	GD
30	19	5	6	59	30	+29	62	11	4	0	37	14	+23	8	1	6	22	16	+6

Source: worldfootball.net

==== Results by round ====
Round	1	2	3	4	5	6	7	8	9	11	12	14	15	16	17	18	19	13	20	21	10	22	23	24	25	26	27	28	29	30
Ground	A	H	H	A	H	A	H	A	H	H	A	A	H	A	A	H	A	H	H	A	A	H	A	H	A	H	A	H	A	H
Result	W	D	W	L	W	D	W	L	D	W	W	W	W	L	W	W	L	W	W	W	L	W	L	D	W	W	W	D	W	W
Position	4	5	4	7	3	3	3	5	3	5	3	2	1	2	1	1	2	2	1	1	6	1	1	2	2	1	1	1	1	1
Points	2	3	5	5	7	8	10	10	11	13	15	17	19	19	21	23	23	25	27	29	29	31	31	32	34	36	38	39	41	43

Source: worldfootball.net
A = Away; H = Home; W = Win; D = Draw; L = Loss

==== Matches ====
Win Draw Loss

15 February 1981 1	Adelaide City	0–1	Sydney City	Adelaide
		Report	Kosmina 49'	Stadium: Hindmarsh Stadium; Attendance: 2,200; Referee: Bobby Kerr

22 February 1981 2	Sydney City	1–1	Brisbane City	Sydney
	Boden 37' (pen.)	Report	Caldwell 74' (pen.)	Stadium: Sydney Sports Ground; Attendance: 1,500; Referee: Doug Rennie

1 March 1981 3	Sydney City	1–0	West Adelaide	Sydney
	Kosmina 39'	Report		Stadium: St George Stadium; Attendance: 1,200; Referee: Tony Boskovic

7 March 1981 4	Canberra City	2–0	Sydney City	Canberra
16:00 AEST	Valeri 10', 58'	Report		Stadium: Bruce Stadium; Attendance: 2,893; Referee: Ken Allen

15 March 1981 5	Sydney City	5–0	Marconi Fairfield	Sydney
	Boden 10', 11', 73'; Gomez 85', 90'	Report		Stadium: ES Marks Athletics Field; Attendance: 3,458; Referee: Tim Davies

29 March 1981 6	Sydney Olympic	2–2	Sydney City	Sydney
	Raskopoulos 61'; Gavin 62'	Report	Boden 19'; Barnes 31'	Stadium: Pratten Park; Attendance: 4,728; Referee: Jim Reeves

5 April 1981 7	Sydney City	1–0	Heidelberg United	Sydney
	Boden 36'	Report		Stadium: ES Marks Athletics Field; Attendance: 2,611; Referee: Ken Small

12 April 1981 8	Footscray JUST	1–0	Sydney City	Melbourne
	Belic 67'	Report		Stadium: Schintler Reserve; Attendance: 1,000; Referee: Dennis Voutsinas

19 April 1981 9	Sydney City	1–1	Brisbane Lions	Sydney
	Souness 20'	Report	Millman 27'	Stadium: ES Marks Athletics Field; Attendance: 1,726; Referee: Richard Lorenc

3 May 1981 11	Sydney City	4–1	Newcastle KB United	Sydney
	Kosmina 1', 25'; Barnes 39', 68'	Report	Jones 72'	Stadium: ES Marks Athletics Field; Attendance: 2,614; Referee: Henry Witschge

10 May 1981 12	APIA Leichhardt	0–1	Sydney City	Sydney
15:00 AEST		Report	Souness 78'	Stadium: Lambert Park; Attendance: 4,284; Referee: Bob Mee

24 May 1981 14	South Melbourne	1–3	Sydney City	Melbourne
	Evans 59'	Report	Bruce 49'; Boden 64', 86'	Stadium: Middle Park Soccer Stadium; Attendance: 8,000; Referee: Bobby Kerr

31 May 1981 15	Sydney City	2–0	Preston Makedonia	Sydney
	Souness 18' (pen.); Watson 57'	Report		Stadium: ES Marks Athletics Field; Attendance: 1,492; Referee: Tim Davies

7 June 1981 16	Brisbane City	2–0	Sydney City	Brisbane
	Gaffney 65'; P. Wilkinson 77'	Report		Stadium: Spencer Park; Attendance: 2,500; Referee: Bob Mee

14 June 1981 17	West Adelaide	1–2	Sydney City	Adelaide
	Topaz 35'	Report	Souness 27', 69'	Stadium: Hindmarsh Stadium; Attendance: 2,900; Referee: Chris Bambridge

21 June 1981 18	Sydney City	3–2	Canberra City	Sydney
15:00 AEST	O'Connor 54'; Boden 57'; Kosmina 61'	Report	J. O'Shea 18'; Mullen 30' (o.g.)	Stadium: ES Marks Athletics Field; Attendance: 2,414; Referee: Tony Boskovic

28 June 1981 19	Marconi Fairfield	1–0	Sydney City	Sydney
	Jankovics 58'	Report		Stadium: Marconi Stadium; Attendance: 6,165; Referee: Barry Harwood

1 July 1981 13	Sydney City	1–0	Wollongong City	Sydney
	Cant 68'	Report		Stadium: St George Stadium; Attendance: 1,500; Referee: Peter Rampley

5 July 1981 20	Sydney City	5–4	Sydney Olympic	Sydney
15:00 AEST	Cant 14'; Souness 21'; Barnes 31', 39', 64'	Report	Koussas 36', 89'; Raskopoulos 66'; Jennings 71'	Stadium: ES Marks Athletics Field; Attendance: 6,892; Referee: Peter Rampley

12 July 1981 21	Heidelberg United	0–1	Sydney City	Melbourne
		Report	Barnes 75'	Stadium: Olympic Park; Attendance: 4,500; Referee: Jack Johnston

15 July 1981 10	Blacktown City	1–0	Sydney City	Sydney
	Krstic 21'	Report		Stadium: Marconi Oval; Attendance: 1,200; Referee: Gary Power

19 July 1981 22	Sydney City	3–0	Footscray JUST	Sydney
	Watson 10'; Boden 69'; Barnes 81'	Report		Stadium: ES Marks Athletics Field; Attendance: 3,427; Referee: Ken Allen

26 July 1981 23	Brisbane Lions	4–3	Sydney City	Brisbane
	Hermiston 45' (pen.); Hamilton 46'; Bennett 67'; Low 73'	Report	Kosmina 4', 58'; Spanos 10'	Stadium: Richlands Stadium; Attendance: 2,500; Referee: Alf Rodway

2 August 1981 24	Sydney City	1–1	Blacktown City	Sydney
	Souness 47'	Report	Jones 61'	Stadium: ES Marks Athletics Field; Attendance: 1,452; Referee: Ken Small

9 August 1981 25	Newcastle KB United	1–2	Sydney City	Newcastle
	Senkalski 34'	Report	Kosmina 49'; Watson 84'	Stadium: Newcastle International Sports Centre; Attendance: 5,232; Referee: Bob Mee

16 August 1981 26	Sydney City	3–0	APIA Leichhardt	Sydney
	Kosmina 16'; Boden 81'; Watson 90'	Report		Stadium: ES Marks Athletics Field; Attendance: 4,216; Referee: Jim Reeves

23 August 1981 27	Wollongong City	0–5	Sydney City	Wollongong
		Report	Boden 5'; Kosmina 57'; Souness 65', 83'; Barnes 88'	Stadium: Wollongong Showground; Attendance: 3,974; Referee: Tim Davies

30 August 1981 28	Sydney City	1–1	South Melbourne	Sydney
15:00 AEST	Souness 66'	Report	Wooddin 46'	Stadium: ES Marks Athletics Field; Attendance: 4,217; Referee: Dave Nugent

6 September 1981 29	Preston Makedonia	0–2	Sydney City	Melbourne
		Report	Barnes 27'; Kosmina 57'	Stadium: B.T. Connor Reserve; Attendance: 6,000; Referee: Jack Johnston

13 September 1981 30	Sydney City	5–3	Adelaide City	Sydney
	Souness 1', 7' (pen.); Barnes 17'; Mullen 50'; Patikas 87'	Report	Melta 4'; Mitchell 6'; Jones 56' (pen.)	Stadium: ES Marks Athletics Field; Attendance: 2,106; Referee: Peter Rampley

=== NSL Cup ===
Win Draw Loss

22 March 1981 First round	Sydney City	3–0	Blacktown City	Newcastle
	Boden 28' (pen.), 37', 86'	Report		Stadium: Newcastle International Sports Centre; Attendance: 1,310; Referee: Alf Rodway

6 May 1981 Second round	Sydney City	1–0 (a.e.t.)	Weston Bears	Sydney
	Boden 116'	Report		Stadium: Marconi Oval; Attendance: 2,000; Referee: Ken Allen

27 May 1981 Third round	Marconi Fairfield	2–2 (a.e.t.) (5–4 p)	Sydney City	Sydney
	Sharne ?'; Krncevic ?'	Report	Boden 46', ?'	Stadium: Marconi Oval; Referee: Richard Lorenc

=== Charity Shield ===
Marconi Fairfield, as National Soccer League champions in the previous season, played against Marconi Fairfield who won the NSL Cup in the previous season in the 1981 Charity Shield.

30 January 1981 Final	Sydney City	1–3 (a.e.t.)	Marconi Fairfield	Sydney
	Kosmina ?'	Report	Cant 90' (o.g.); Sharne ?', ?'	Stadium: Redfern Oval; Attendance: 3,500; Referee: Henry Witschge

== Statistics ==
=== Appearances and goals ===
Includes all competitions. Players with no appearances not included in the list.

No.	Pos.	Nat.	Player	National Soccer League		NSL Cup		Charity Shield		Total	
No.	Pos.	Nat.	Player	Apps	Goals	Apps	Goals	Apps	Goals	Apps	Goals
1	GK	(Australia)	Todd Clarke	22	0	0	0	0	0	22	0
2	DF	(Australia)	Kevin Mullen	16+1	1	2	0	0	0	19	1
3	DF	(Australia)	John Spanos	29	1	3	0	1	0	33	1
4	DF	(Australia)	Steve O'Connor	27	1	3	0	0	0	30	1
5	DF	(Scotland)	Ian Bruce	23+1	1	3	0	1	0	28	1
6	FW	(Scotland)	Willie Murray	10+5	0	0+2	0	1	0	18	0
7	MF	(Australia)	Joe Watson	29+1	4	3	0	1	0	34	4
8	MF	(Australia)	Murray Barnes	28	11	2+1	0	1	0	32	11
9	MF	(Australia)	Ken Boden	27+1	12	3	6	1	0	32	18
10	FW	(Australia)	John Kosmina	26	11	3	0	1	1	30	12
11	FW	(Brazil)	Hilton Silva	1+3	0	1	0	0	0	5	0
12	MF	(Australia)	Jimmy Cant	17+8	2	1+1	0	1	0	28	2
14	DF	(Costa Rica)	Gerry Gomez	5+7	2	0+1	0	1	0	14	2
16	MF	(Australia)	Jim Patikas	19+5	1	2	0	0	0	26	1
18	MF	(Australia)	Ian Souness	27	12	3	0	1	0	31	12
20	GK	(Australia)	Tony Pezzano	8	0	3	0	1	0	12	0
21	MF	(Australia)	Grant Lee	0+4	0	0	0	0	0	4	0
—	MF	(Australia)	Agenor Muniz	7+1	0	1	0	0	0	9	0
—	DF	(Scotland)	Alex Robertson	9+5	0	0	0	0	0	14	0

=== Disciplinary record ===
Includes all competitions. The list is sorted by squad number when total cards are equal. Players with no cards not included in the list.

Rank	No.	Pos.	Nat.	Player	National Soccer League			NSL Cup			Total		
Rank	No.	Pos.	Nat.	Player	Yellow card	Second yellow card	Red card	Yellow card	Second yellow card	Red card	Yellow card	Second yellow card	Red card
1	18	MF	(Australia)	Ian Souness	4	0	1	0	0	0	4	0	1
2	2	DF	(Australia)	Kevin Mullen	4	0	0	1	0	0	5	0	0
3	10	FW	(Australia)	John Kosmina	3	0	0	1	0	0	4	0	0
4	3	DF	(Australia)	John Spanos	2	0	0	1	0	0	3	0	0
4	8	MF	(Australia)	Murray Barnes	3	0	0	0	0	0	3	0	0
6	4	DF	(Australia)	Steve O'Connor	2	0	0	0	0	0	2	0	0
6	9	MF	(Australia)	Ken Boden	1	0	0	1	0	0	2	0	0
8	7	MF	(Australia)	Joe Watson	1	0	0	0	0	0	1	0	0
8	14	DF	(Costa Rica)	Gerry Gomez	1	0	0	0	0	0	1	0	0
8	16	MF	(Australia)	Jim Patikas	1	0	0	0	0	0	1	0	0
Total					22	0	1	4	0	0	26	0	1

=== Clean sheets ===
Includes all competitions. The list is sorted by squad number when total clean sheets are equal. Numbers in parentheses represent games where both goalkeepers participated and both kept a clean sheet; the number in parentheses is awarded to the goalkeeper who was substituted on, whilst a full clean sheet is awarded to the goalkeeper who was on the field at the start of play. Goalkeepers with no clean sheets not included in the list.

Rank	No.	Nat.	Goalkeeper	NSL	NSL Cup	Total
1	1	(Australia)	Todd Clarke	8	0	8
2	20	(Australia)	Tony Pezzano	4	2	6
Total				12	2	14
