= 1982 Brisbane Lions SC season =

Brisbane Lions
1982 season
- Head Coach: Joe Gilroy
- Stadium: Lions Stadium
- National Soccer League: 11th
- NSL Cup: Semi-finals
- Charity Shield: Runners-up
- Top goalscorer: League: Billy Wilkinson (10); All: Billy Williamson (11)
- Highest home attendance: 3,281 vs. West Adelaide (6 June 1982); National Soccer League
- Lowest home attendance: 400 vs. Canberra City (5 September 1982); National Soccer League
- Average home league attendance: 1,543
- Biggest win: 7–1 vs. Footscray JUST (H) (7 March 1982); National Soccer League
- Biggest defeat: 0–4 vs. APIA Leichhardt (H) (21 February 1982); National Soccer League; 1–5 vs. St George-Budapest (A) (11 July 1982); National Soccer League
Home colours	Away colours

The 1982 season was the sixth in the National Soccer League for Brisbane Lions Soccer Club (now Queensland Lions). In addition to the domestic league, they also participated in the NSL Cup. Brisbane Lions finished 11th in their National Soccer League season, and were eliminated in the quarter-finals of the NSL Cup.

== Players ==
Note: Flags indicate national team as defined under FIFA eligibility rules; some limited exceptions apply. Players may hold more than one non-FIFA nationality.

No.	Pos.	Nation	Player
—	MF	ENG	Mark Atmore
—	DF	AUS	Colin Bennett
—	DF	AUS	Paul Burns
—	FW	AUS	Calvin Daunt
—	FW	ENG	Steve Dolan
—	FW	SCO	Bobby Ferris
—	DF	AUS	Steve Hogg
—	DF	AUS	Steve Jackson
—	FW	ENG	Craig Low
—	GK	ENG	Nigel Lowndes
—	DF	AUS	Peter McClurg

No.	Pos.	Nation	Player
—	MF	SCO	Jim McLean
—	DF	SCO	Bob McSkimming
—	FW	AUS	Ron Millman
—	DF	AUS	Alan Niven
—	MF	AUS	John Ogden
—		AUS	Marty Ratcliffe
—	GK	AUS	Tony Scanlan
—	FW	ENG	Alan Sunderland
—		AUS	Malcolm Tuttle
—	FW	SCO	Billy Williamson
—	FW	AUS	Danny Wright

== Competitions ==
=== Overall record ===
Competition	First match	Last match	Starting round	Final position	Record							
Competition	First match	Last match	Starting round	Final position	Pld	W	D	L	GF	GA	GD	Win %
National Soccer League	14 February 1982	5 September 1982	Matchday 1	11th	30	10	8	12	39	42	−3	33.33
NSL Cup	14 June 1982	11 August 1982	First round	Semi-finals	3	2	0	1	2	2	+0	66.67
Charity Shield	31 January 1982		Final	Runners-up	1	0	0	1	1	3	−2	0.00
Total					34	12	8	14	42	47	−5	35.29

Source: Competitions

=== National Soccer League ===
==== League table ====
Pos	Team	Pld	W	D	L	GF	GA	GD	Pts	Relegation
1	Sydney City (C)	30	20	5	5	68	28	+40	45	Qualification to Finals series (Note: The Finals series was not considered the championship for the 1982 National Soccer League.)
2	St George-Budapest	30	14	8	8	47	40	+7	36	Qualification to Finals series
3	Wollongong City	30	16	3	11	43	46	−3	35	Qualification to Finals series
4	Heidelberg United	30	13	8	9	42	37	+5	34	Qualification to Finals series
5	Preston Makedonia	30	12	10	8	45	41	+4	34	
6	South Melbourne	30	11	9	10	46	37	+9	31	
7	APIA Leichhardt	30	12	7	11	49	54	−5	31	
8	Sydney Olympic	30	12	6	12	52	42	+10	30	
9	West Adelaide	30	10	8	12	44	40	+4	28	
10	Marconi Fairfield	30	12	4	14	44	43	+1	28	
11	Brisbane Lions	30	10	8	12	39	42	−3	28	
12	Newcastle KB United	30	10	7	13	43	52	−9	27	
13	Adelaide City	30	6	12	12	36	44	−8	24	
14	Footscray JUST	30	5	14	11	34	46	−12	24	
15	Canberra City	30	7	10	13	37	54	−17	24	
16	Brisbane City	30	5	11	14	32	55	−23	21	

Source: rsssf.com
Rules for classification: 1) points; 2) goal difference; 3) number of goals scored.
(C) Champions

==== Results summary ====
Overall								Home						Away					
Pld	W	D	L	GF	GA	GD	Pts	W	D	L	GF	GA	GD	W	D	L	GF	GA	GD
30	10	8	12	39	42	−3	38	7	2	6	24	19	+5	3	6	6	15	23	−8

Source: worldfootball.net

==== Results by round ====
Round	1	2	3	4	5	6	7	8	9	10	11	12	13	14	15	16	17	18	19	20	21	22	23	24	25	26	27	28	29	30
Ground	A	H	A	H	A	H	A	H	A	H	H	A	H	A	H	A	H	A	H	A	H	A	H	A	A	H	A	H	A	H
Result	D	L	D	W	D	W	L	D	W	L	D	D	W	L	L	L	W	D	L	L	W	L	W	D	W	L	W	L	L	W
Position	11	13	14	7	6	5	8	8	6	8	9	9	8	9	9	10	8	9	12	12	11	12	11	11	11	11	10	10	12	11
Points	1	1	2	4	5	7	7	8	10	10	11	12	14	14	14	14	16	17	17	17	19	19	21	22	24	24	26	26	26	28

Source: worldfootball.net
A = Away; H = Home; W = Win; D = Draw; L = Loss

==== Matches ====
Win Draw Loss

14 February 1982 1	West Adelaide	0–0	Brisbane Lions	Adelaide
		Report		Stadium: Hindmarsh Stadium; Attendance: 2,500; Referee: Don Campbell

21 February 1992 2	Brisbane Lions	0–4	APIA Leichhardt	Brisbane
		Report	Giampaolo 37'; Bradley 64'; Soper 67'; Morsello 73'	Stadium: Richlands Stadium; Attendance: 2,000; Referee: Alan Kibbler

28 February 1982 3	Brisbane City	2–2	Brisbane Lions	Brisbane
	Wilkinson 50'; Kelso 81'	Report	Williamson 34', 59'	Stadium: Spencer Park; Attendance: 3,500; Referee: Col Amos

7 March 1982 4	Brisbane Lions	7–1	Footscray JUST	Brisbane
	Hogg 3'; Low 4'; McLean 9'; Williamson 21' (pen.), 68'; Niven 56'; Daunt 62'	Report	Ilioski 90' (pen.)	Stadium: Richlands Stadium; Attendance: 1,221; Referee: Dave Nugent

14 March 1982 5	Canberra City	2–2	Brisbane Lions	Canberra
	Valeri 35'; Brennan 43'	Report	Williamson 81', 85'	Stadium: Bruce Stadium; Attendance: 2,250; Referee: Bob Mee

21 March 1982 6	Brisbane Lions	4–1	Newcastle KB United	Brisbane
	Ferris 11'; Millman 71', 86'; Williamson 89'	Report	Lowe 42'	Stadium: Richlands Stadium; Attendance: 1,200; Referee: Alan Kibbler

28 March 1982 7	Heidelberg United	2–0	Brisbane Lions	Melbourne
	Campbell 33'; MacLeod 67'	Report		Stadium: Olympic Park; Attendance: 2,000; Referee: Chris Bambridge

3 April 1982 8	Brisbane Lions	1–1	St George-Budapest	Brisbane
	Daunt 90+2'	Report	Barton 13'	Stadium: Richlands Stadium; Attendance: 1,100; Referee: Bill Monteverde

11 April 1982 9	Adelaide City	0–2	Brisbane Lions	Adelaide
		Report	Millman 4', 44'	Stadium: Olympic Sports Field; Attendance: 3,100; Referee: Jim Rossis

18 April 1982 10	Brisbane Lions	0–1	Marconi Fairfield	Brisbane
		Report	Licata 65'	Stadium: Richlands Stadium; Attendance: 1,400; Referee: Dave Nugent

25 April 1982 11	Brisbane Lions	1–1	Sydney Olympic	Brisbane
	Low 69'	Report	Jennings 21'	Stadium: Richlands Stadium; Attendance: 3,000; Referee: Col Amos

2 May 1982 12	Preston Makedonia	1–1	Brisbane Lions	Melbourne
	Brown 4'	Report	Millman 36'	Stadium: B.T. Connor Reserve; Attendance: 2,000; Referee: Jim Fearn

9 May 1982 13	Brisbane Lions	2–0	Wollongong City	Brisbane
	Low 16'; Williamson 85'	Report		Stadium: Richlands Stadium; Attendance: 1,200; Referee: Alan Kibbler

16 May 1982 14	South Melbourne	2–1	Brisbane Lions	Melbourne
	Campbell 20'; Egan 50'	Report	Atmore 80'	Stadium: Middle Park Soccer Stadium; Attendance: 5,000; Referee: Jim Fearn

23 May 1982 15	Brisbane Lions	0–1	Sydney City	Brisbane
		Report	Bennett 66' (o.g.)	Stadium: Richlands Stadium; Attendance: 1,800; Referee: Bob Mee

30 May 1982 16	APIA Leichhardt	1–0	Brisbane Lions	Sydney
	Soper 59'	Report		Stadium: Lambert Park; Attendance: 4,022; Referee: Ray Davies

6 June 1982 17	Brisbane Lions	2–1	West Adelaide	Brisbane
	Sunderland 37', 41' (pen.)	Report	Honeyman 83' (pen.)	Stadium: Richlands Stadium; Attendance: 3,281; Referee: Col Amos

13 June 1982 18	Footscray JUST	1–1	Brisbane Lions	Melbourne
	Ristovski 36'	Report	Wright 2'	Stadium: Schintler Reserve; Attendance: 2,000; Referee: Jim Fearn

20 June 1982 19	Brisbane Lions	1–3	Brisbane City	Brisbane
	Wright 20'	Report	Conner 30' (pen.); Tokesi 43'; Bohan 54'	Stadium: Richlands Stadium; Attendance: 2,148; Referee: Bill Monteverde

26 June 1982 20	Newcastle KB United	3–1	Brisbane Lions	Newcastle
	Johnston 7', 52', 85'	Report	Sunderland ?'	Stadium: Newcastle International Sports Centre; Attendance: 6,524; Referee: Rob Davies

4 July 1982 21	Brisbane Lions	1–0	Heidelberg United	Brisbane
	Sunderland 63'	Report		Stadium: Richlands Stadium; Attendance: 2,400; Referee: Alan Kibbler

11 July 1982 22	St George-Budapest	5–1	Brisbane Lions	Sydney
	Wilkinson 16'; R. O'Shea 18'; Marton 34', 42' (pen.); Barton 60'	Report	Ogden 43' (pen.)	Stadium: St George Stadium; Attendance: 2,434; Referee: Jim Reeves

18 July 1982 23	Brisbane Lions	2–0	Adelaide City	Brisbane
	Hogg 38'; Millman 40'	Report		Stadium: Richlands Stadium; Attendance: 800; Referee: Bill Monteverde

25 July 1982 24	Marconi Fairfield	1–1	Brisbane Lions	Sydney
	Sharne 52'	Report	Hogg 34'	Stadium: Marconi Stadium; Attendance: 2,119; Referee: Gary Power

1 August 1982 25	Sydney Olympic	0–1	Brisbane Lions	Sydney
		Report	Daunt 34'	Stadium: Pratten Park; Attendance: 4,807; Referee: Ken Small

8 August 1982 26	Brisbane Lions	2–3	Preston Makedonia	Brisbane
	Williamson 42' (pen.); Low 73'	Report	McMillan 16'; Jackson 33' (o.g.); Ward 37'	Stadium: Richlands Stadium; Attendance: 500; Referee: Dave Nugent

15 August 1982 27	Wollongong City	0–2	Brisbane Lions	Wollongong
		Report	Hogg 73'; Williamson 81'	Stadium: Wollongong Showground; Attendance: 3,179; Referee: Gary Power

22 August 1982 28	Brisbane Lions	0–2	South Melbourne	Brisbane
		Report	Egan 33'; Rogers 44'	Stadium: Richlands Stadium; Attendance: 700; Referee: Alan Kibbler

29 August 1982 29	Sydney City	3–0	Brisbane Lions	Sydney
	Lee 7'; Borges 54'; Watson 78'	Report		Stadium: ES Marks Athletics Field; Attendance: 1,092; Referee: Rob Davies

5 September 1982 30	Brisbane Lions	1–0	Canberra City	Brisbane
	Williamson 29'	Report		Stadium: Richlands Stadium; Attendance: 400; Referee: Dave Nugent

=== NSL Cup ===
14 June 1982 First round	Brisbane Lions	1–0	Brisbane City	Brisbane
	Williamson 75'	Report		Stadium: Perry Park; Attendance: Referee: Dave Nugent

14 July 1982 Quarter-finals	Brisbane Lions	1–0	Sydney City	Brisbane
	Hogg 42'	Report		Stadium: Perry Park; Attendance: 1,000; Referee: Col Amos

11 August 1982 Semi-finals	APIA Leichhardt	2–0	Brisbane Lions	Sydney
	Bradley 13'; Morsello 84'	Report		Stadium: St George Stadium; Attendance: 831; Referee: Peter Rampley

=== Charity Shield ===
31 January 1982	Sydney City	3–1	Brisbane Lions	Brisbane
	Bennett 34' (o.g.); Kosmina 51', 72'	Report	Burns 75'	Stadium: Richlands Stadium; Attendance: 1,000~; Referee: Dave Nugent

== Statistics ==
=== Appearances and goals ===
Includes all competitions. Players with no appearances not included in the list.

No.	Pos.	Nat.	Player	National Soccer League		NSL Cup		Charity Shield		Total	
No.	Pos.	Nat.	Player	Apps	Goals	Apps	Goals	Apps	Goals	Apps	Goals
—	MF	(England)	Mark Atmore	20	1	3	0	0	0	23	1
—	DF	(Australia)	Colin Bennett	30	0	3	0	1	0	34	0
—	DF	(Australia)	Paul Burns	18+1	0	2	0	1	0	22	0
—	FW	(Australia)	Calvin Daunt	9+3	3	3	0	1	0	16	3
—	FW	(England)	Steve Dolan	1	0	0	0	0	0	1	0
—	FW	(Scotland)	Bobby Ferris	24+2	1	3	0	1	0	30	1
—		(Australia)	Michael Gerritsen	0	0	0+1	0	0	0	1	0
—	DF	(Australia)	Steve Hogg	24+1	4	2	1	1	0	28	5
—	DF	(Australia)	Steve Jackson	3+3	0	1	0	0	0	7	0
—	FW	(England)	Craig Low	12+4	4	1	0	1	0	18	4
—	GK	(England)	Nigel Lowndes	18	0	1	0	1	0	20	0
—	DF	(Australia)	Peter McClurg	1	0	0	0	0	0	1	0
—	MF	(Scotland)	Jim McLean	10	1	0	0	1	0	11	1
—	DF	(Scotland)	Bob McSkimming	28	0	3	0	1	0	32	0
—	FW	(Australia)	Ron Millman	26+3	7	1+1	0	0+1	0	32	7
—	DF	(Australia)	Alan Niven	28	1	3	0	1	0	32	1
—	MF	(Australia)	John Ogden	12+4	1	1+1	0	0	0	18	1
—		(Australia)	Marty Ratcliffe	0+1	0	0	0	0	0	1	0
—	GK	(Australia)	Tony Scanlan	12	0	2	0	0	0	14	0
—	FW	(England)	Alan Sunderland	5	4	1	0	0	0	6	4
—		(Australia)	Malcolm Tuttle	6	0	0	0	0	0	6	0
—	FW	(Scotland)	Billy Williamson	27	10	2	1	1	0	30	11
—	FW	(Australia)	Danny Wright	16+2	2	1	0	0	0	19	2

=== Disciplinary record ===
Includes all competitions. The list is sorted by squad number when total cards are equal. Players with no cards not included in the list.

Rank	No.	Pos.	Nat.	Player	National Soccer League			NSL Cup			Charity Shield			Total		
Rank	No.	Pos.	Nat.	Player	Yellow card	Second yellow card	Red card	Yellow card	Second yellow card	Red card	Yellow card	Second yellow card	Red card	Yellow card	Second yellow card	Red card
1	—	DF	(Scotland)	Bob McSkimming	2	0	0	1	0	1	0	0	0	3	0	1
2	—	FW	(Australia)	Calvin Daunt	1	0	0	1	0	0	1	0	0	3	0	0
2	—	FW	(Australia)	Ron Millman	2	0	0	1	0	0	0	0	0	3	0	0
2	—	FW	(Scotland)	Billy Williamson	3	0	0	0	0	0	0	0	0	3	0	0
5	—	DF	(Australia)	Colin Bennett	1	0	0	1	0	0	0	0	0	2	0	0
6	—	MF	(England)	Mark Atmore	1	0	0	0	0	0	0	0	0	1	0	0
6	—	DF	(Australia)	Paul Burns	1	0	0	0	0	0	0	0	0	1	0	0
6	—	FW	(Scotland)	Bobby Ferris	1	0	0	0	0	0	0	0	0	1	0	0
6	—	DF	(Australia)	Steve Hogg	0	0	0	0	0	0	1	0	0	1	0	0
6	—	GK	(England)	Nigel Lowndes	1	0	0	0	0	0	0	0	0	1	0	0
6	—	MF	(Scotland)	Jim McLean	1	0	0	0	0	0	0	0	0	1	0	0
6	—	DF	(Australia)	Alan Niven	1	0	0	0	0	0	0	0	0	1	0	0
6	—	MF	(Australia)	John Ogden	1	0	0	0	0	0	0	0	0	1	0	0
6	—	FW	(England)	Alan Sunderland	1	0	0	0	0	0	0	0	0	1	0	0
Total					17	0	0	4	0	1	2	0	0	23	0	1

=== Clean sheets ===
Includes all competitions. The list is sorted by squad number when total clean sheets are equal. Numbers in parentheses represent games where both goalkeepers participated and both kept a clean sheet; the number in parentheses is awarded to the goalkeeper who was substituted on, whilst a full clean sheet is awarded to the goalkeeper who was on the field at the start of play. Goalkeepers with no clean sheets not included in the list.

Rank	No.	Nat.	Goalkeeper	NSL	NSL Cup	Charity Shield	Total
1	—	(England)	Nigel Lowndes	4	1	0	5
1	—	(Australia)	Tony Scanlan	4	1	0	5
Total				8	2	0	10
