= 1982 APIA Leichhardt FC season =

4th season in existence of APIA Leichhardt FC in the National Soccer League

APIA Leichhardt
1982 season
- President: Nick Papallo
- Manager-Coach: Willie Wallace; Peter Wilson
- Stadium: Lambert Park
- National Soccer League: 7th
- NSL Cup: Winners
- Top goalscorer: League: Marshall Soper (14); All: Marshall Soper (15)
- Highest home attendance: 6,484 vs. Sydney Olympic (11 July 1982); National Soccer League
- Lowest home attendance: 2,380 vs. Heidelberg United (15 August 1982); National Soccer League
- Average home league attendance: 3,846
- Biggest win: 4–0 vs. Brisbane Lions (A) (21 February 1982); National Soccer League
- Biggest defeat: 1–7 vs. Marconi Fairfield (A) (6 June 1982); National Soccer League
| Home colours | Away colours |

The 1982 season was the fourth in the National Soccer League for APIA Leichhardt Football Club. In addition to the domestic league, they also participated in the NSL Cup. APIA Leichhardt finished 7th in their National Soccer League season, and won the NSL Cup.

== Players ==
Note: Flags indicate national team as defined under FIFA eligibility rules; some limited exceptions apply. Players may hold more than one non-FIFA nationality.

| No. | Pos. | Nation | Player |
|---|---|---|---|
| 1 | GK | AUS | Greg Woodhouse |
| 2 | DF | AUS | Rod Skellern |
| 3 | DF | AUS | Col McAusland |
| 4 | DF | AUS | Mark Pullen |
| 5 | MF | AUS | Ian Gray |
| 6 | FW | SCO | John Bradley |
| 7 | MF | AUS | Terry Butler |
| 8 | | ENG | Jim McBreen |
| 9 | FW | AUS | Marshall Soper |
| 10 | FW | AUS | Tony Morsello |
| 11 | FW | AUS | Paul Burrows |
| 12 | FW | AUS | Sebastian Giampaolo |

| No. | Pos. | Nation | Player |
|---|---|---|---|
| — | DF | AUS | Paul Carter |
| — | FW | AUS | Robert De Ceglie |
| — | FW | AUS | Bernie Godzik |
| — | MF | SCO | Alan Hughes |
| — | FW | AUS | Peter Jones |
| — | MF | AUS | Zdenko Kafka |
| — | | AUS | Tom Kilkelly |
| — | GK | AUS | Bob Parks |
| — | DF | AUS | David Watt |
| — | DF | AUS | Peter Wilson |
| — | | AUS | Frank Zaccomer |

== Competitions ==
=== Overall record ===
| Competition | First match | Last match | Starting round | Final position | Record | | | | | | | |
| Competition | First match | Last match | Starting round | Final position | Pld | W | D | L | GF | GA | GD | Win % |
|---|---|---|---|---|---|---|---|---|---|---|---|---|
| National Soccer League | 14 February 1982 | 5 September 1982 | Matchday 1 | 7th | 30 | 12 | 7 | 11 | 49 | 54 | −5 | 40.00 |
| NSL Cup | 14 June 1982 | 12 September 1982 | First round | Winners | 4 | 4 | 0 | 0 | 11 | 5 | +6 | 100.00 |
| Total | | | | | 34 | 16 | 7 | 11 | 60 | 59 | +1 | 47.06 |

Source: Competitions

=== National Soccer League ===
==== League table ====
| Pos | Team | Pld | W | D | L | GF | GA | GD | Pts | Relegation |
|---|---|---|---|---|---|---|---|---|---|---|
| 1 | Sydney City (C) | 30 | 20 | 5 | 5 | 68 | 28 | +40 | 45 | Qualification to Finals series (Note: The Finals series was not considered the championship for the 1982 National Soccer League.) |
| 2 | St George-Budapest | 30 | 14 | 8 | 8 | 47 | 40 | +7 | 36 | Qualification to Finals series |
| 3 | Wollongong City | 30 | 16 | 3 | 11 | 43 | 46 | −3 | 35 | Qualification to Finals series |
| 4 | Heidelberg United | 30 | 13 | 8 | 9 | 42 | 37 | +5 | 34 | Qualification to Finals series |
| 5 | Preston Makedonia | 30 | 12 | 10 | 8 | 45 | 41 | +4 | 34 | |
| 6 | South Melbourne | 30 | 11 | 9 | 10 | 46 | 37 | +9 | 31 | |
| 7 | APIA Leichhardt | 30 | 12 | 7 | 11 | 49 | 54 | −5 | 31 | |
| 8 | Sydney Olympic | 30 | 12 | 6 | 12 | 52 | 42 | +10 | 30 | |
| 9 | West Adelaide | 30 | 10 | 8 | 12 | 44 | 40 | +4 | 28 | |
| 10 | Marconi Fairfield | 30 | 12 | 4 | 14 | 44 | 43 | +1 | 28 | |
| 11 | Brisbane Lions | 30 | 10 | 8 | 12 | 39 | 42 | −3 | 28 | |
| 12 | Newcastle KB United | 30 | 10 | 7 | 13 | 43 | 52 | −9 | 27 | |
| 13 | Adelaide City | 30 | 6 | 12 | 12 | 36 | 44 | −8 | 24 | |
| 14 | Footscray JUST | 30 | 5 | 14 | 11 | 34 | 46 | −12 | 24 | |
| 15 | Canberra City | 30 | 7 | 10 | 13 | 37 | 54 | −17 | 24 | |
| 16 | Brisbane City | 30 | 5 | 11 | 14 | 32 | 55 | −23 | 21 | |

Source: rsssf.com
Rules for classification: 1) points; 2) goal difference; 3) number of goals scored.
(C) Champions

==== Results summary ====
| Overall | | | | | | | | Home | | | | | | Away | | | | | |
| Pld | W | D | L | GF | GA | GD | Pts | W | D | L | GF | GA | GD | W | D | L | GF | GA | GD |
|---|---|---|---|---|---|---|---|---|---|---|---|---|---|---|---|---|---|---|---|
| 30 | 12 | 7 | 11 | 49 | 54 | −5 | 43 | 8 | 4 | 3 | 28 | 22 | +6 | 4 | 3 | 8 | 21 | 32 | −11 |

Source: worldfootball.net

==== Results by round ====
| Round | 1 | 2 | 3 | 4 | 5 | 6 | 7 | 8 | 9 | 10 | 11 | 12 | 13 | 14 | 15 | 16 | 17 | 18 | 19 | 20 | 21 | 22 | 23 | 24 | 25 | 26 | 27 | 28 | 29 | 30 |
|---|---|---|---|---|---|---|---|---|---|---|---|---|---|---|---|---|---|---|---|---|---|---|---|---|---|---|---|---|---|---|
| Ground | H | A | H | A | H | A | H | A | A | H | A | H | A | H | A | H | A | H | A | H | A | H | H | A | H | A | H | A | H | A |
| Result | W | W | W | W | W | W | D | L | D | L | D | W | L | W | D | W | L | D | L | L | L | L | D | W | W | L | D | L | W | L |
| Position | 4 | 1 | 1 | 1 | 1 | 1 | 1 | 1 | 1 | 2 | 2 | 2 | 2 | 2 | 2 | 1 | 3 | 2 | 3 | 5 | 6 | 7 | 7 | 7 | 5 | 5 | 5 | 7 | 6 | 7 |
| Points | 2 | 4 | 6 | 8 | 10 | 12 | 13 | 13 | 14 | 14 | 15 | 17 | 17 | 19 | 20 | 22 | 22 | 23 | 23 | 23 | 23 | 23 | 24 | 26 | 28 | 28 | 29 | 29 | 31 | 31 |

Source: worldfootball.net
A = Away; H = Home; W = Win; D = Draw; L = Loss

==== Matches ====
Win Draw Loss

| 14 February 1982 1 | APIA Leichhardt | 2–0 | Marconi Fairfield | Sydney |
| | McBreen 41'; Giampaolo 83' | Report | | Stadium: Lambert Park; Attendance: 4,233; Referee: Tony Boskovic |

| 21 February 1982 2 | Brisbane Lions | 0–4 | APIA Leichhardt | Brisbane |
| | | Report | Giampaolo 37'; Bradley 64'; Soper 67'; Morsello 73' | Stadium: Richlands Stadium; Attendance: 2,000; Referee: Alan Kibbler |

| 28 February 1982 3 | APIA Leichhardt | 4–2 | Preston Makedonia | Sydney |
| | Giampaolo 3', 88'; Bradley 40'; Soper 84' | Report | Whittle 65'; Cullen 80' | Stadium: Lambert Park; Attendance: 4,419; Referee: Richard Lorenc |

| 7 March 1982 4 | Wollongong City | 2–4 | APIA Leichhardt | Wollongong |
| | Dunleavy 78'; Campbell ?' | Report | Soper 41', 47'; Bradley 44'; Morsello 66' | Stadium: Wollongong Showground; Attendance: 3,000; Referee: Tim Davies |

| 14 March 1982 5 | APIA Leichhardt | 3–2 | South Melbourne | Sydney |
| | Burrows 10'; Soper 80', 88' | Report | Egan 53'; Buljevic 86' | Stadium: Lambert Park; Attendance: 2,794; Referee: Jim Reeves |

| 21 March 1982 6 | Sydney City | 0–1 | APIA Leichhardt | Sydney |
| | | Report | Soper 85' | Stadium: ES Marks Athletics Field; Attendance: 3,560; Referee: Peter Rampley |

| 28 March 1982 7 | APIA Leichhardt | 0–0 | West Adelaide | Sydney |
| | | Report | | Stadium: Lambert Park; Attendance: 4,219; Referee: Doug Rennie |

| 4 April 1982 8 | Sydney Olympic | 2–0 | APIA Leichhardt | Sydney |
| | Koussas 39'; Phillips 85' | Report | | Stadium: Pratten Park; Attendance: 12,186; Referee: Richard Lorenc |

| 11 April 1982 9 | Brisbane City | 1–1 | APIA Leichhardt | Brisbane |
| | Palinkas 13' | Report | Bohan 18' (o.g.) | Stadium: Spencer Park; Attendance: 2,600; Referee: Col Amos |

| 18 April 1982 10 | APIA Leichhardt | 0–2 | Footscray JUST | Sydney |
| | | Report | Simic 72'; Kojic 84' | Stadium: Lambert Park; Attendance: 4,128; Referee: Ken Small |

| 26 April 1982 11 | Canberra City | 2–2 | APIA Leichhardt | Canberra |
| | Christopoulos 17'; T. Byrne 73' | Report | Soper 47'; Bradley 75' | Stadium: Bruce Stadium; Attendance: 3,800; Referee: Bob Mee |

| 2 May 1982 12 | APIA Leichhardt | 3–2 | Newcastle KB United | Sydney |
| | Bradley 28'; Gray 33'; Giampaolo 85' | Report | Tredinnick 78'; Lowe 81' | Stadium: Lambert Park; Attendance: 3,000; Referee: Brian Fowler (Terry Seacy 57') |

| 9 May 1982 13 | Heidelberg United | 3–2 | APIA Leichhardt | Melbourne |
| | Cole 32'; Rooney 49'; Paton 77' | Report | Giampaolo 48' (pen.); Bradley 80' | Stadium: Olympic Village; Attendance: 3,000; Referee: Chris Bambridge |

| 16 May 1982 14 | APIA Leichhardt | 3–2 | St George-Budapest | Sydney |
| | Soper 11'; Giampaolo 29' (pen.); Skeen 42' (o.g.) | Report | Slater 81', 90+2' | Stadium: Lambert Park; Attendance: 5,259; Referee: Peter Rampley |

| 23 May 1982 15 | Adelaide City | 1–1 | APIA Leichhardt | Adelaide |
| | Melta 50' | Report | Soper 35' | Stadium: Olympic Sports Field; Attendance: 3,120; Referee: Bob Kerr |

| 30 May 1982 16 | APIA Leichhardt | 1–0 | Brisbane Lions | Sydney |
| | Soper 59' | Report | | Stadium: Lambert Park; Attendance: 4,022; Referee: Ray Davies |

| 6 June 1982 17 | Marconi Fairfield | 7–1 | APIA Leichhardt | Sydney |
| | Hunter 5'; Jankovics 30', 51'; Bozanic 45' (pen.); Licata 61', 87'; McCulloch 73' | Report | Giampaolo 85' (pen.) | Stadium: Marconi Stadium; Attendance: 7,863; Referee: Ken Small |

| 13 June 1982 18 | APIA Leichhardt | 2–2 | Wollongong City | Sydney |
| | Bradley 36'; Giampaolo 43' (pen.) | Report | O'Connor 53', 87' | Stadium: Lambert Park; Attendance: 3,828; Referee: Gary Power |

| 20 June 1982 19 | Preston Makedonia | 2–0 | APIA Leichhardt | Melbourne |
| | Lucchesi 12'; Ollerton 89' (pen.) | Report | | Stadium: B.T. Connor Reserve; Attendance: 1,800; Referee: Evan Venios |

| 27 June 1982 20 | APIA Leichhardt | 1–4 | Sydney City | Sydney |
| | Giampaolo 21' (pen.) | Report | Patikas 47'; Murray ?'; Spanos 71'; Mitchell 75' | Stadium: Lambert Park; Attendance: 5,428; Referee: Richard Lorenc |

| 4 July 1982 21 | West Adelaide | 5–2 | APIA Leichhardt | Adelaide |
| | Dunn 11'; Manecas 50'; Boath 55'; Honeyman 63'; Heys 84' | Report | Giampaolo 25'; Kafka 89' | Stadium: Hindmarsh Stadium; Attendance: 3,250; Referee: Don Campbell |

| 11 July 1982 22 | APIA Leichhardt | 0–3 | Sydney Olympic | Sydney |
| | | Report | Katholos 29', 36', 86' | Stadium: Lambert Park; Attendance: 6,484; Referee: Peter Rampley |

| 18 July 1982 23 | APIA Leichhardt | 1–1 | Brisbane City | Sydney |
| | Carter 85' (pen.) | Report | Palinkas 61' | Stadium: Lambert Park; Attendance: 2,483; Referee: Ken Small |

| 25 July 1982 24 | Footscray JUST | 0–1 | APIA Leichhardt | Melbourne |
| | | Report | Jones 55' | Stadium: Schintler Reserve; Attendance: 1,500; Referee: Jim Fearn |

| 1 August 1982 25 | APIA Leichhardt | 3–0 | Canberra City | Sydney |
| | Jones 4', 81'; McBreen ?' | Report | | Stadium: Lambert Park; Attendance: 2,403; Referee: Jim Reeves |

| 7 August 1982 26 | Newcastle KB United | 1–0 | APIA Leichhardt | Newcastle |
| 15:00 AEST | Drysdale 29' | Report | | Stadium: Newcastle International Sports Centre; Attendance: 3,462; Referee: Gary Power |

| 15 August 1982 27 | APIA Leichhardt | 1–1 | Heidelberg United | Sydney |
| | Jones 83' | Report | Paton 67' | Stadium: Lambert Park; Attendance: 2,380; Referee: Doug Rennie |

| 22 August 1982 28 | St George-Budapest | 3–1 | APIA Leichhardt | Sydney |
| | MacDougall 2'; Marton 34', 74' | Report | Jones 63' | Stadium: St George Stadium; Attendance: 4,320; Referee: Tony Boskovic |

| 29 August 1982 29 | APIA Leichhardt | 4–1 | Adelaide City | Sydney |
| | Pullen 5'; Giampaolo 65' (pen.); Soper 80', 85' | Report | L. Carter 68' | Stadium: Lambert Park; Attendance: 2,608; Referee: Peter Rampley |

| 5 September 1982 30 | South Melbourne | 3–1 | APIA Leichhardt | Melbourne |
| | Kilkelly 13' (o.g.); Davidson 60'; Egan 71' | Report | Soper 50' | Stadium: Middle Park Soccer Stadium; Attendance: 1,500; Referee: Chris Bambridge |

=== NSL Cup ===
Win Draw Loss

| 14 June 1982 First round | APIA Leichhardt | 5–3 | Sydney Olympic | Sydney |
| | Bradley 42'; Burrows 56'; Giampaolo 70'; McBreen 84'; Soper 90' | Report | Jennings 24'; Redfern 73'; Gavin 77' | Stadium: Pratten Park; Attendance: 2,216; Referee: Tim Davies |

| 14 July 1982 Quarter-finals | Marconi Fairfield | 1–2 | APIA Leichhardt | Sydney |
| | Jankovics 75' | Report | Jones 80', 89' | Stadium: Marconi Stadium; Attendance: 1,055; Referee: Tim Davies |

| 11 August 1982 Semi-finals | APIA Leichhardt | 2–0 | Brisbane Lions | Sydney |
| | Bradley 13'; Morsello 84' | Report | | Stadium: St George Stadium; Attendance: 831; Referee: Peter Rampley |

| 12 September 1982 Final | Heidelberg United | 1–2 | APIA Leichhardt | Melbourne |
| 15:00 AEST | Campbell 63' | Report | McBreen 79'; Butler 85' | Stadium: Olympic Park; Attendance: 5,000; Referee: Don Campbell |

== Statistics ==
=== Appearances and goals ===
Includes all competitions. Players with no appearances not included in the list.

| No. | Pos. | Nat. | Player | National Soccer League | | NSL Cup | | Total | |
| No. | Pos. | Nat. | Player | Apps | Goals | Apps | Goals | Apps | Goals |
|---|---|---|---|---|---|---|---|---|---|
| 1 | GK | (Australia) | Greg Woodhouse | 17 | 0 | 0 | 0 | 17 | 0 |
| 2 | DF | (Australia) | Rod Skellern | 16 | 0 | 1 | 0 | 17 | 0 |
| 3 | DF | (Australia) | Col McAusland | 28 | 0 | 4 | 0 | 32 | 0 |
| 4 | DF | (Australia) | Mark Pullen | 27 | 1 | 3 | 0 | 30 | 1 |
| 5 | MF | (Australia) | Ian Gray | 17 | 1 | 0 | 0 | 17 | 1 |
| 6 | FW | (Scotland) | John Bradley | 30 | 7 | 4 | 2 | 34 | 9 |
| 7 | MF | (Australia) | Terry Butler | 27 | 0 | 4 | 1 | 31 | 1 |
| 8 | — | (England) | Jim McBreen | 21+2 | 2 | 3 | 2 | 26 | 4 |
| 9 | FW | (Australia) | Marshall Soper | 24 | 14 | 1+1 | 1 | 26 | 15 |
| 10 | FW | (Australia) | Tony Morsello | 20+2 | 2 | 2 | 1 | 24 | 3 |
| 11 | FW | (Australia) | Paul Burrows | 12+2 | 1 | 1 | 1 | 15 | 2 |
| 12 | FW | (Australia) | Sebastian Giampaolo | 18+2 | 12 | 2+1 | 1 | 23 | 13 |
| — | DF | (Australia) | Paul Carter | 13 | 1 | 4 | 0 | 17 | 1 |
| — | FW | (Australia) | Robert De Ceglie | 7 | 0 | 3 | 0 | 10 | 0 |
| — | FW | (Australia) | Bernie Godzik | 1+6 | 0 | 0+2 | 0 | 9 | 0 |
| — | MF | (Scotland) | Alan Hughes | 9+3 | 0 | 2 | 0 | 14 | 0 |
| — | FW | (Australia) | Peter Jones | 9 | 5 | 3 | 2 | 12 | 7 |
| — | MF | (Australia) | Zdenko Kafka | 5+2 | 1 | 0 | 0 | 7 | 1 |
| — | — | (Australia) | Tom Kilkelly | 7+1 | 0 | 0 | 0 | 8 | 0 |
| — | GK | (Australia) | Bob Parks | 13 | 0 | 4 | 0 | 17 | 0 |
| — | DF | (Australia) | David Watt | 1 | 0 | 0 | 0 | 1 | 0 |
| — | DF | (Australia) | Peter Wilson | 8 | 0 | 3 | 0 | 11 | 0 |
| — | — | (Australia) | Frank Zaccomer | 0+3 | 0 | 0 | 0 | 3 | 0 |

=== Disciplinary record ===
Includes all competitions. The list is sorted by squad number when total cards are equal. Players with no cards not included in the list.

| Rank | No. | Pos. | Nat. | Player | National Soccer League | | | NSL Cup | | | Total | | |
| Rank | No. | Pos. | Nat. | Player | Yellow card | Second yellow card | Red card | Yellow card | Second yellow card | Red card | Yellow card | Second yellow card | Red card |
|---|---|---|---|---|---|---|---|---|---|---|---|---|---|
| 1 | 7 | MF | (Australia) | Terry Butler | 3 | 0 | 1 | 0 | 0 | 0 | 3 | 0 | 1 |
| 2 | 9 | FW | (Australia) | Marshall Soper | 6 | 0 | 0 | 0 | 0 | 0 | 6 | 0 | 0 |
| 3 | 4 | DF | (Australia) | Mark Pullen | 2 | 0 | 0 | 2 | 0 | 0 | 4 | 0 | 0 |
| 4 | 3 | DF | (Australia) | Col McAusland | 2 | 0 | 0 | 1 | 0 | 0 | 3 | 0 | 0 |
| 4 | 8 | MF | (England) | Jim McBreen | 2 | 0 | 0 | 1 | 0 | 0 | 3 | 0 | 0 |
| 6 | — | FW | (Australia) | Peter Jones | 2 | 0 | 0 | 0 | 0 | 0 | 2 | 0 | 0 |
| 7 | 11 | FW | (Australia) | Paul Burrows | 1 | 0 | 0 | 0 | 0 | 0 | 1 | 0 | 0 |
| 7 | 12 | FW | (Australia) | Sebastian Giampaolo | 1 | 0 | 0 | 0 | 0 | 0 | 1 | 0 | 0 |
| 7 | — | MF | (Australia) | Zdenko Kafka | 1 | 0 | 0 | 0 | 0 | 0 | 1 | 0 | 0 |
| Total | | | | | 20 | 0 | 1 | 4 | 0 | 0 | 24 | 0 | 1 |

=== Clean sheets ===
Includes all competitions. The list is sorted by squad number when total clean sheets are equal. Numbers in parentheses represent games where both goalkeepers participated and both kept a clean sheet; the number in parentheses is awarded to the goalkeeper who was substituted on, whilst a full clean sheet is awarded to the goalkeeper who was on the field at the start of play. Goalkeepers with no clean sheets not included in the list.

| Rank | No. | Nat. | Goalkeeper | NSL | NSL Cup | Total |
|---|---|---|---|---|---|---|
| 1 | 1 | (Australia) | Greg Woodhouse | 5 | 0 | 5 |
| 2 | — | (Australia) | Bob Parks | 2 | 1 | 3 |
| Total | | | | 7 | 1 | 8 |
