= 1981 Brisbane Lions SC season =

Brisbane Lions
1981 season
- Head Coach: Matt Carson
- Stadium: Richlands Stadium
- National Soccer League: 6th
- NSL Cup: Winners
- Top goalscorer: League: Billy Williamson (9); All: Billy Williamson (12)
- Highest home attendance: 3,500 vs. Brisbane City (12 April 1981); National Soccer League
- Lowest home attendance: 300 vs. Grange Thistle (6 May 1981); NSL Cup
- Average home league attendance: 2,127
- Biggest win: 4–0 vs. Footscray JUST (24 May 1981); National Soccer League
- Biggest defeat: 1–3 vs. Sydney Olympic (16 August 1981); National Soccer League

The 1981 season was the fifth in the National Soccer League for Brisbane Lions (now Queensland Lions Football Club). In addition to the domestic league, they also participated in the NSL Cup. Brisbane Lions finished 6th in their National Soccer League season, and won the NSL Cup.

== Players ==
Note: Flags indicate national team as defined under FIFA eligibility rules; some limited exceptions apply. Players may hold more than one non-FIFA nationality.

No.	Pos.	Nation	Player
1	GK	AUS	Tony Scanlan
2	MF	RSA	Paul Ontong
3	DF	AUS	Alan Niven
4	MF	AUS	Gerry Lindsay
5	DF	AUS	Colin Bennett
6	DF	SCO	Jim Hermiston
7	DF	AUS	Steve Hogg
8	MF	SCO	Jim McLean
9	FW	SCO	Bobby Ferris
10	FW	AUS	Ron Millman
11	FW	NZL	Mark McNaughton
12	FW	AUS	Tom McGregor
13	MF	AUS	Graham Wilson

No.	Pos.	Nation	Player
14	MF	AUS	John Ogden
15	DF	AUS	Paul Burns
16	FW	AUS	Craig Low
17	FW	ENG	Bob Latchford
18	DF	AUS	Steve Jackson
19		AUS	Lyle Bryce
20	GK	ENG	Nigel Lowndes
—	MF	AUS	Richard Bassingthwaighte
—	FW	AUS	Calvin Daunt
—		AUS	Steve Konstantinou
—	MF	NZL	Johan Verweij
—	FW	SCO	Billy Williamson
—	FW	AUS	Danny Wright

== Competitions ==
=== Overall record ===
Competition	First match	Last match	Starting round	Final position	Record							
Competition	First match	Last match	Starting round	Final position	Pld	W	D	L	GF	GA	GD	Win %
National Soccer League	14 February 1981	13 September 1981	Matchday 1	6th	30	11	11	8	41	33	+8	36.67
NSL Cup	29 April 1981	20 September 1981	First round	Winners	5	5	0	0	12	3	+9	100.00
Total					35	16	11	8	53	36	+17	45.71

Source: Competitions

=== National Soccer League ===
==== League table ====
Pos	Team	Pld	W	D	L	GF	GA	GD	Pts	Relegation
1	Sydney City (C)	30	19	5	6	59	30	+29	43	
2	South Melbourne	30	13	13	4	41	27	+14	39	
3	Brisbane City	30	12	11	7	37	25	+12	35	
4	APIA Leichhardt	30	12	11	7	39	33	+6	35	
5	Canberra City	30	13	7	10	41	32	+9	33	
6	Brisbane Lions	30	11	11	8	41	33	+8	33	
7	Adelaide City	30	13	6	11	46	42	+4	32	
8	Heidelberg United	30	12	7	11	48	40	+8	31	
9	Sydney Olympic	30	11	9	10	46	46	0	31	
10	Newcastle KB United	30	11	8	11	41	41	0	30	
11	Wollongong City	30	8	12	10	35	39	−4	28	
12	Preston Makedonia	30	9	7	14	39	41	−2	25	
13	Footscray JUST	30	9	7	14	32	48	−16	25	
14	Marconi Fairfield	30	9	7	14	23	45	−22	25	
15	Blacktown City (R)	30	6	9	15	32	47	−15	21	Relegated to the 1982 NSW State League
16	West Adelaide	30	5	4	21	26	57	−31	14	

Updated to match(es) played on unknown. Source: rsssf.com
Rules for classification: 1) points; 2) goal difference; 3) number of goals scored.
(C) Champions; (R) Relegated

==== Results summary ====
Overall								Home						Away					
Pld	W	D	L	GF	GA	GD	Pts	W	D	L	GF	GA	GD	W	D	L	GF	GA	GD
30	11	11	8	41	33	+8	44	9	4	2	23	10	+13	2	7	6	18	23	−5

Source: worldfootball.net

==== Results by round ====
Round	1	2	3	4	5	6	7	8	9	10	11	12	14	15	16	17	18	19	20	21	22	23	24	25	26	27	13	28	29	30
Ground	A	H	A	H	A	H	A	H	A	H	A	H	H	H	A	H	A	H	A	H	A	H	A	H	A	H	A	A	A	H
Result	D	L	D	D	L	W	L	W	D	W	L	D	W	W	D	D	D	W	D	W	L	W	W	W	L	D	D	L	W	L
Position	7	11	11	10	12	9	12	9	11	10	10	9	9	8	8	7	7	7	6	6	6	5	5	3	4	5	9	7	5	6
Points	1	1	2	3	3	5	5	7	8	10	10	11	13	15	16	17	18	20	21	23	23	25	27	29	29	30	31	31	33	33

Source: worldfootball.net
A = Away; H = Home; W = Win; D = Draw; L = Loss

==== Matches ====
Win Draw Loss

14 February 1981 1	Blacktown City	2–2	Brisbane Lions	Sydney
	O'Donnell 28' (pen.); Hormazabal 62'	Report	Hogg 45'; Bennett 83'	Stadium: Gabbie Stadium; Attendance: 2,138; Referee: Tim Davies

22 February 1981 2	Brisbane Lions	0–1	Newcastle KB United	Brisbane
		Report	Buckley 87'	Stadium: Lions Stadium; Attendance: 1,800; Referee: Dave Nugent

1 March 1981 3	APIA Leichhardt	0–0	Brisbane Lions	Sydney
		Report		Stadium: Lambert Park; Attendance: 2,651; Referee: Richard Lorenc

8 March 1981 4	Brisbane Lions	1–1	Wollongong City	Brisbane
	Ferris 44'	Report	Adam 27' (pen.)	Stadium: Lions Stadium; Attendance: 1,970; Referee: Jack Wood

15 March 1981 5	South Melbourne	1–0	Brisbane Lions	Melbourne
	Cummings 83'	Report		Stadium: Middle Park Soccer Stadium; Attendance: 5,000; Referee: Jim Fearn

29 March 1981 6	Brisbane Lions	2–1	Preston Makedonia	Brisbane
	Hogg 10'; Bryce 27'	Report	Cullen 64'	Stadium: Richlands Stadium; Attendance: 1,830; Referee: Col Amos

5 April 1981 7	Adelaide City	3–2	Brisbane Lions	Adelaide
	Russell 4'; Mitchell 8'; Marocchi 17'	Report	Bryce 13'; Hermiston 77'	Stadium: Olympic Sports Field; Attendance: 3,200; Referee: Jim Rossis

12 April 1981 8	Brisbane Lions	1–0	Brisbane City	Brisbane
	Millman 26'	Report		Stadium: Richlands Stadium; Attendance: 3,500; Referee: Ken Allen

19 April 1981 9	Sydney City	1–1	Brisbane Lions	Sydney
	Souness 20'	Report	Millman 27'	Stadium: ES Marks Athletics Field; Attendance: 1,726; Referee: Richard Lorenc

26 April 1981 10	Brisbane Lions	1–0	Canberra City	Brisbane
	Millman 32'	Report		Stadium: Richlands Stadium; Attendance: 1,300; Referee: Dave Nugent

3 May 1981 11	Marconi Fairfield	2–1	Brisbane Lions	Sydney
	Johnston 47'; Sharne 75'	Report	Hermiston 40'	Stadium: Marconi Stadium; Attendance: 2,225; Referee: Ken Small

10 May 1981 12	Brisbane Lions	1–1	Sydney Olympic	Brisbane
	Millman 29'	Report	Jennings 53'	Stadium: Richlands Stadium; Attendance: 1,500; Referee: Des Miles

24 May 1981 14	Brisbane Lions	4–0	Footscray JUST	Brisbane
	Latchford 24', 62'; Millman 27'; Low 32'	Report		Stadium: Richlands Stadium; Attendance: 3,000; Referee: Jack Wood

31 May 1981 15	Brisbane Lions	3–1	West Adelaide	Brisbane
	McNaughton 39'; Bennett 46'; Latchford 69'	Report	Bozanic 62'	Stadium: Richlands Stadium; Attendance: 2,500; Referee: Col Amos

7 June 1981 16	Newcastle KB United	1–1	Brisbane Lions	Newcastle
	Channon 62'	Report	Hermiston 83' (pen.)	Stadium: Newcastle International Sports Centre; Attendance: 6,060; Referee: Peter Rampley

14 June 1981 17	Brisbane Lions	0–0	APIA Leichhardt	Brisbane
		Report		Stadium: Richlands Stadium; Attendance: 2,000; Referee: Jim Reeves

21 June 1981 18	Wollongong City	1–1	Brisbane Lions	Wollongong
	McBreen 62'	Report	Low 40'	Stadium: Wollongong Showground; Attendance: 3,748; Referee: Gary Power

28 June 1981 19	Brisbane Lions	2–0	South Melbourne	Brisbane
	Daunt 23'; Latchford 61'	Report		Stadium: Richlands Stadium; Attendance: 3,000; Referee: Dave Nugent

5 July 1981 20	Preston Makedonia	1–1	Brisbane Lions	Melbourne
	Ollerton 88'	Report	Ferris 77'	Stadium: B.T. Connor Reserve; Attendance: 3,000; Referee: Stewart Mellings

12 July 1981 21	Brisbane Lions	2–1	Adelaide City	Brisbane
	Ferris 57'; Williamson 83'	Report	Melta 52'	Stadium: Richlands Stadium; Attendance: 2,500; Referee: Col Amos

19 July 1981 22	Brisbane City	1–0	Brisbane Lions	Brisbane
	P. Wilkinson 62'	Report		Stadium: Spencer Park; Attendance: 5,000; Referee: Tim Davies

26 July 1981 23	Brisbane Lions	4–3	Sydney City	Brisbane
	Hermiston 45' (pen.); Hamilton 46'; Bennett 67'; Low 73'	Report	Kosmina 4', 58'; Spanos 10'	Stadium: Richlands Stadium; Attendance: 2,500; Referee: Alf Rodway

2 August 1981 24	Canberra City	2–3	Brisbane Lions	Canberra
	Valeri 60'; R. O'Shea 72'	Report	Williamson 1', 80'; Bennett 48'	Stadium: Bruce Stadium; Attendance: 1,603; Referee: Bob Mee

9 August 1981 25	Brisbane Lions	2–0	Marconi Fairfield	Brisbane
	Ferris 28'; Williamson 48'	Report		Stadium: Richlands Stadium; Attendance: 2,000; Referee: Dave Nugent

16 August 1981 26	Sydney Olympic	3–1	Brisbane Lions	Sydney
	Koussas 46'; Redfern 47'; Raskopoulos 87'	Report	Williamson 55'	Stadium: Pratten Park; Attendance: 5,728; Referee: Gary Power

23 August 1981 27	Brisbane Lions	0–0	Heidelberg United	Brisbane
		Report		Stadium: Richlands Stadium; Attendance: 1,500; Referee: Col Amos

26 August 1981 13	Heidelberg United	2–2	Brisbane Lions	Melbourne
	Taylor 25'; Bozikas 44'	Report	Williamson 9'; Daunt 84'	Stadium: Olympic Park; Attendance: 500; Referee: Jim Fearn

30 August 1981 28	Footscray JUST	2–0	Brisbane Lions	Melbourne
	Cozzella 37'; Lujic 50'	Report		Stadium: Schintler Reserve; Attendance: 2,500; Referee: Chris Bambridge

6 September 1981 29	West Adelaide	1–3	Brisbane Lions	Adelaide
	Stefanopoulos 85'	Report	Williamson 34', 70'; Low 59'	Stadium: Hindmarsh Stadium; Attendance: 1,500; Referee: Don Campbell

13 September 1981 30	Brisbane Lions	0–1	Blacktown City	Brisbane
		Report	Turner 30'	Stadium: Richlands Stadium; Attendance: 1,000; Referee: Col Amos

=== NSL Cup ===
Win Draw Loss

29 April 1981 First round	Townsville United	0–3	Brisbane Lions	Townsville
		Report	Ferris 32', 72'; Whalley 89' (o.g.)	Stadium: Townsville Sports Reserve; Attendance: 1,400; Referee: A. Barrell

6 May 1981 Second round	Brisbane Lions	2–0	Grange Thistle	Brisbane
	Cameron 17' (o.g.); Hermiston 32'	Report		Stadium: Perry Park; Attendance: 300; Referee: Jack Wood

3 June 1981 Quarter-finals	Brisbane Lions	1–0	St Kilda Hakoah	Brisbane
	Ferris 25'	Report		Stadium: Richlands Stadium; Attendance: 600; Referee: Dave Nugent

5 August 1981 Semi-finals	Marconi Fairfield	2–3	Brisbane Lions	Sydney
	(unknown) ?', ?'	Report	Bennett 46'; Williamson 59', 62'	Stadium: Marconi Oval; Attendance: 3,200; Referee: Peter Rampley

20 September 1981 Final	Brisbane Lions	3–1	West Adelaide	Canberra
15:00 AEST	Daunt 4'; Ferris 75'; Williamson 87' (pen.)	Report	Topaz 82'	Stadium: Canberra Stadium; Attendance: 6,132; Referee: Chris Bambridge

== Statistics ==
=== Appearances and goals ===
Includes all competitions. Players with no appearances not included in the list.

No.	Pos.	Nat.	Player	National Soccer League		NSL Cup		Total	
No.	Pos.	Nat.	Player	Apps	Goals	Apps	Goals	Apps	Goals
1	GK	(Australia)	Tony Scanlan	7+1	0	1	0	9	0
2	MF	(South Africa)	Paul Ontong	28	0	5	0	33	0
3	DF	(Australia)	Alan Niven	27	0	4	0	31	0
4	MF	(Australia)	Gerry Lindsay	12	0	2	0	14	0
5	DF	(Australia)	Colin Bennett	25	4	5	1	30	5
6	DF	(Scotland)	Jim Hermiston	29	4	5	1	34	5
7	DF	(Australia)	Steve Hogg	3+5	0	4	0	12	0
8	MF	(Scotland)	Jim McLean	27+1	0	4	0	32	0
9	FW	(Scotland)	Bobby Ferris	29+1	4	5	4	35	8
10	FW	(Australia)	Ron Millman	13	5	2	0	15	5
11	FW	(New Zealand)	Mark McNaughton	7+7	1	0	0	14	1
12	FW	(Australia)	Tom McGregor	0+2	0	0+2	0	4	0
13	MF	(Australia)	Graham Wilson	7+3	0	0	0	10	0
14	MF	(Australia)	John Ogden	6+9	0	2+2	0	19	0
15	DF	(Australia)	Paul Burns	5+1	0	0	0	6	0
16	FW	(Australia)	Craig Low	17+2	4	3	0	22	4
17	FW	(England)	Bob Latchford	3+1	4	1	0	5	4
19	—	(Australia)	Lyle Bryce	6+1	2	3	0	10	2
20	GK	(England)	Nigel Lowndes	23+1	0	3	0	27	0
—	GK	(Australia)	Tony Burley	0	0	1	0	1	0
—	FW	(Australia)	Calvin Daunt	15+3	2	2	1	20	3
—	—	(Australia)	Steve Konstantinou	3+5	0	1	0	9	0
—	MF	(New Zealand)	Johan Verweij	0+2	0	0	0	2	0
—	FW	(Scotland)	Billy Williamson	11	9	2	3	13	12
—	FW	(Australia)	Danny Wright	2	0	0	0	2	0

=== Disciplinary record ===
Includes all competitions. The list is sorted by squad number when total cards are equal. Players with no cards not included in the list.

Rank	No.	Pos.	Nat.	Player	National Soccer League			NSL Cup			Total		
Rank	No.	Pos.	Nat.	Player	Yellow card	Second yellow card	Red card	Yellow card	Second yellow card	Red card	Yellow card	Second yellow card	Red card
1	7	DF	(Australia)	Steve Hogg	0	0	1	0	0	0	0	0	1
2	5	DF	(Australia)	Colin Bennett	3	0	0	0	0	0	3	0	0
2	—	FW	(Australia)	Calvin Daunt	2	0	0	1	0	0	3	0	0
4	2	MF	(South Africa)	Paul Ontong	2	0	0	0	0	0	2	0	0
4	4	MF	(Australia)	Gerry Lindsay	2	0	0	0	0	0	2	0	0
6	3	DF	(Australia)	Alan Niven	1	0	0	0	0	0	1	0	0
6	6	DF	(Scotland)	Jim Hermiston	1	0	0	0	0	0	1	0	0
6	8	MF	(Scotland)	Jim McLean	1	0	0	0	0	0	1	0	0
6	10	FW	(Australia)	Ron Millman	1	0	0	0	0	0	1	0	0
6	20	GK	(England)	Nigel Lowndes	0	0	0	1	0	0	1	0	0
6	—	FW	(Scotland)	Billy Williamson	1	0	0	0	0	0	1	0	0
Total					14	0	1	2	0	0	16	0	1

=== Clean sheets ===
Includes all competitions. The list is sorted by squad number when total clean sheets are equal. Numbers in parentheses represent games where both goalkeepers participated and both kept a clean sheet; the number in parentheses is awarded to the goalkeeper who was substituted on, whilst a full clean sheet is awarded to the goalkeeper who was on the field at the start of play. Goalkeepers with no clean sheets not included in the list.

Rank	No.	Nat.	Goalkeeper	NSL	NSL Cup	Total
1	20	(England)	Nigel Lowndes	5	2	7
2	1	(Australia)	Tony Scanlan	2	0	2
3	—	(Australia)	Tony Burley	0	1	1
Total				7	3	10
