= 1982 Charity Shield (NSL) =

Association football championship match

Sydney City	Brisbane Lions
3	1
- Date: 31 January 1982
- Venue: Richlands Stadium, Brisbane
- Referee: Henry Witschge
- Attendance: 1,000~
- Weather: Hot, steamy

The 1982 Charity Shield was the second and final Charity Shield (NSL), a soccer match played between the winners of the previous season's National Soccer League champion and NSL Cup winner. It took place at Richlands Stadium in Brisbane on 31 January 1982, between Sydney City and Brisbane Lions. Sydney City won 3–1, winning the final Charity Shield.

== Background ==
Sydney City qualified for the 1982 Charity Shield as champions of the 1981 National Soccer League. Brisbane Lions qualified for the 1982 Charity Shield as 1981 NSL Cup winners.

== Match ==
=== Summary ===
Brisbane Lions defender Colin Bennett headed an own goal to put Sydney City ahead 1–0 in the first half. John Kosmina doubled Sydney City's lead pulling the defence left and scoring with space on his right foot. Kosmina scored once more as he ran behind, collected the ball and put it past Lowndes to make it 3–0 for Sydney City. Three minutes later, Brisbane scored one through Paul Burns, but not enough as Sydney City won 3–1.

=== Details ===
31 January 1982

Sydney City	3–1	Brisbane Lions
Bennett 34' (o.g.); Kosmina 51', 72'	Report	Burns 75'

Richlands Stadium, Brisbane
Attendance: 1,000~
Referee: Dave Nugent

GK
DF
DF
DF
DF
DF
MF
MF
FW
FW
FW
Substitutes:
DF
Head Coach:
(Australia) Eddie Thomson

(Australia) Todd Clarke
(Australia) Jimmy Cant
(Australia) Alex Robertson
(Australia) Steve O'Connor
(Australia) Ian Bruce	Booked
(Australia) John Spanos
(Australia) Ian Souness
(Australia) Murray Barnes
(Australia) Joe Watson	(substituted off) 73'
(Australia) John Kosmina
(Australia) Willie Murray
(Australia) Kevin Mullen	(substituted in) 73'

GK
DF
DF
DF
DF
MF
MF
FW
FW
FW
FW
Substitutes:
FW
Head Coach:
(Australia) Joe Gilroy

(Australia) Nigel Lowndes
(Scotland) Bob McSkimming
(Australia) Colin Bennett
(Australia) Paul Burns
(Australia) Alan Niven
(Scotland) Jim McLean
(Australia) Steve Hogg	Booked
(Scotland) Bobby Ferris
(Australia) Craig Low
(Australia) Calvin Daunt	Booked	(substituted off) 59'
(Scotland) Billy Williamson
(Australia) Ron Millman	(substituted in) 59'
