= 1982 NSL Cup =

National Soccer League Cup

Tournament details
- Country: Australia
- Dates: 14 June – 12 September 1982
- Teams: 16

Final positions
- Champions: APIA Leichhardt (1st title)
- Runners-up: Heidelberg United

Tournament statistics
- Matches played: 15
- Goals scored: 46 (3.07 per match)
- Attendance: 29,676 (1,978 per match)

The 1982 NSL Cup was the sixth edition of the NSL Cup, which was the main national association football knockout cup competition in Australia. The competition was known as the Philips Cup under a sponsorship arrangement with Dutch company Philips.

Brisbane Lions were the defending champions, having defeated West Adelaide to win their first title in the previous year's final, but they were eliminated in the semi-finals by APIA Leichhardt.

APIA Leichhardt defeated Heidelberg United 2–1 in the final to win their first NSL Cup title.

== Teams ==
The NSL Cup was a knockout competition with 16 teams taking part all trying to reach the Final in September 1982. The competition consisted of the 16 teams from the National Soccer League.

Round	Main date	Number of fixtures	Clubs remaining
First round	Monday 14 June 1982	8	16 → 8
Quarter-finals	Wednesday 14 July 1982	4	8 → 4
Semi-finals	Wednesday 11 August 1982	2	4 → 2
Final	Sunday 12 September 1982	1	2 → 1

== Bracket ==
First round
South Melbourne	0 (4)
Heidelberg United (a.e.t.)	0 (5)
Preston Makedonia	2
Footscray JUST	0
West Adelaide (a.e.t.)	3
Adelaide City	1
Canberra City	3
St George-Budapest	2
Marconi Fairfield (a.e.t.)	2 (4)
Newcastle KB United	2 (2)
Sydney Olympic	3
APIA Leichhardt Tigers	5
Brisbane Lions	3
Brisbane City	1
Wollongong City	1
Sydney City	5

Quarter-finals
Heidelberg United	1
Preston Makedonia	0
West Adelaide	0
Canberra City	2
Marconi Fairfield	1
APIA Leichhardt Tigers	2
Brisbane Lions	1
Sydney City	0

Semi-finals
Heidelberg United	4
Canberra City	3
APIA Leichhardt Tigers	2
Brisbane Lions	1

Final
Heidelberg United	1
APIA Leichhardt Tigers	2

== First round ==
The draw was made during the week of 18 May 1982.

14 June 1982	APIA Leichhardt	5–3	Sydney Olympic	Sydney
	Bradley 42'; Burrows 56'; Giampaolo 70'; McBreen 84'; Soper 90'	Report	Jennings 24'; Redfern 73'; Gavin 77'	Stadium: Pratten Park; Attendance: 2,216; Referee: Tim Davies

14 June 1982	Brisbane Lions	1–0	Brisbane City	Brisbane
	Williamson 75'	Report		Stadium: Perry Park; Referee: Dave Nugent

14 June 1982	Canberra City	3–2	St George Budapest	Canberra
	Gibson ?'; Stone 79'; Reis 90'	Report	Marton 52'; Slater 75'	Stadium: Bruce Stadium; Attendance: 1,800; Referee: Bob Mee

14 June 1982	Newcastle KB United	2–2 (a.e.t.) (2–4 p)	Marconi Fairfield	Gosford
	Lowe 10', 30'	Report	(unknown) ?', ?'	Stadium: Grahame Park; Attendance: 2,874

14 June 1982	Preston Makedonia	2–0	Footscray JUST	Melbourne
	Opasinis 5'; Ward 23'	Report		Stadium: B.T. Connor Reserve; Attendance: 2,500; Referee: Stewart Mellings

14 June 1982	South Melbourne	0–0 (a.e.t.) (4–5 p)	Heidelberg United (1)	Melbourne
		Report		Stadium: Middle Park Soccer Stadium; Attendance: 6,000; Referee: Jim Fearn

14 June 1982	West Adelaide	3–1 (a.e.t.)	Adelaide City	Adelaide
	Heys 56'; Honeyman 95'; Atsalas 97'	Report	Marocchi 44'	Stadium: Hindmarsh Stadium; Attendance: 3,900

14 June 1982	Wollongong City	1–5	Sydney City	Wollongong
	O'Conner 26'	Report	Kosmina 29', 88'; Lee 50', 80'; Borges 65'	Stadium: Memorial Park; Attendance: 500; Referee: Doug Rennie

== Quarter-finals ==
14 July 1982	Brisbane Lions	1–0	Sydney City	Brisbane
	Hogg 42'	Report		Stadium: Perry Park; Attendance: 1,000; Referee: Col Amos

14 July 1982	Heidelberg United	1–0	Preston Makedonia	Melbourne
	Valentine 75'	Report		Stadium: Olympic Park; Attendance: 1,000; Referee: Jim Fearn

14 July 1982	Marconi Fairfield	1–2	APIA Leichhardt	Sydney
	Jankovics 75'	Report	Jones 80', 89'	Stadium: Marconi Stadium; Attendance: 1,055; Referee: Tim Davies

14 July 1982	West Adelaide	0–2	Canberra City	Adelaide
		Report	Stone 38'; Christopoulos 86'	Stadium: Hindmarsh Stadium; Referee: Don Campbell

== Semi-finals ==
11 August 1982	APIA Leichhardt	2–0	Brisbane Lions	Sydney
	Bradley 13'; Morsello 84'	Report		Stadium: St George Stadium; Attendance: 831; Referee: Peter Rampley

11 August 1982	Heidelberg United	3–1	Canberra City	Melbourne
	Taylor 12'; Valentine 14'; Cole 26' (pen.)	Report	Gibson 57'	Stadium: Olympic Park; Attendance: 1,000; Referee: Chris Bambridge

== Final ==
12 September 1982
15:00 AEST

Heidelberg United	1–2	APIA Leichhardt
Campbell 63'	Report	McBreen 79'; Butler 85'

Olympic Park, Melbourne
Attendance: 5,000
Referee: Don Campbell
