= 1981 National Soccer League =

Australian soccer season

National Soccer League
- Season: 1981
- Dates: 14 February–13 September
- Champions: Sydney Slickers (3rd title)
- Promoted: Preston Rams; Sydney Olympians; Wollongong Wolves
- Relegated: Blacktown Demons
- Matches: 240
- Goals: 626 (2.61 per match)
- Best Player: Bobby Russell
- Top goalscorer: Gary Cole (16)
- Any extra information here.

The National Soccer League 1981 season was the fifth season of the Australian National Soccer League (NSL). The league was known as the Philips Soccer League (PSL) in a sponsorship arrangement with Dutch electronics company Philips. The champions were Sydney Slickers, winning their third title.

== Changes from 1980 ==
The league increased from 14 to 16 teams prior to the 1981 season. Despite finishing second last—ordinarily a relegation position—in 1980, West Adelaide (known as Adelaide Hawks in 1981) were retained for 1981. Wooden-spooner St George were the only team to be relegated, with three new teams being introduced - Preston Makedonia (nicknamed Rams in 1981) Sydney Olympic (Sydney Olympians in 1981) and Wollongong City (Wollongong Wolves).

Prior to the season commencing, in what was described as "Australianisation" of the national league, nicknames were imposed on the clubs, some of which were not popular with the teams themselves. Marconi President, Tony Labbozzetta expressed his dislike of the enforced nickname Leopards, suggesting "Call us Datsun", referring to a naming rights deal the club had made with the Japanese carmaker. Along with the new nicknames, new macho logos were introduced. John Clark, a marketing executive at the Australian Soccer Federation, claimed that "we are not trying to take ethnicism out of soccer" and that they were trying to appeal to boys "not following in their fathers' footsteps, boys now into space invaders, Buck Rogers in the 25th century, who aren't following soccer."

The league consisted of a double round-robin format, played between February and September. The league was required to finish by the end of September due to Australia's hosting of the 1981 FIFA World Youth Championship in October. Unlike the 1980 season, a post-season finals series was not held and the league championship was awarded to the team at the top of the table. The final series was reintroduced the following year.

== Teams ==
Location of teams in 1981 National Soccer League

Team Other names	City	Stadium
Adelaide Giants; Adelaide City	Adelaide	Olympic Sports Field; Hindmarsh Stadium
Adelaide Hawks; West Adelaide	Adelaide	Hindmarsh Stadium
Blacktown Demons; Blacktown City	Sydney	Gabbie Stadium
Brisbane Gladiators; Brisbane City	Brisbane	Spencer Park; Ballymore
Brisbane Lions	Brisbane	Richlands Stadium
Canberra Arrows; Canberra City	Canberra	Bruce Stadium
Footscray Eagles; Footscray JUST	Melbourne	Schintler Reserve
Heidelberg Warriors	Melbourne	Olympic Park
Leichhardt Strikers; APIA Leichhardt	Sydney	Lambert Park
Marconi-Datsun Leopards; Marconi Stallions	Sydney	Marconi Stadium
Newcastle KB Raiders	Newcastle	International Sports Centre
Preston Rams; Preston Makedonia	Melbourne	Connor Reserve
South Melbourne Gunners; South Melbourne Hellas	Melbourne	Middle Park
Sydney Olympians; Sydney Olympic	Sydney	Pratten Park
Sydney Slickers; Sydney City	Sydney	Sydney Athletic Field; St George Stadium
Wollongong Wolves; Wollongong City	Wollongong	Wollongong Showground

== League table ==
Pos	Team	Pld	W	D	L	GF	GA	GD	Pts	Relegation
1	Sydney City (C)	30	19	5	6	59	30	+29	43	
2	South Melbourne	30	13	13	4	41	27	+14	39	
3	Brisbane City	30	12	11	7	37	25	+12	35	
4	APIA Leichhardt	30	12	11	7	39	33	+6	35	
5	Canberra City	30	13	7	10	41	32	+9	33	
6	Brisbane Lions	30	11	11	8	41	33	+8	33	
7	Adelaide City	30	13	6	11	46	42	+4	32	
8	Heidelberg United	30	12	7	11	48	40	+8	31	
9	Sydney Olympic	30	11	9	10	46	46	0	31	
10	Newcastle KB United	30	11	8	11	41	41	0	30	
11	Wollongong City	30	8	12	10	35	39	−4	28	
12	Preston Makedonia	30	9	7	14	39	41	−2	25	
13	Footscray JUST	30	9	7	14	32	48	−16	25	
14	Marconi Fairfield	30	9	7	14	23	45	−22	25	
15	Blacktown City (R)	30	6	9	15	32	47	−15	21	Relegated to the 1982 NSW State League
16	West Adelaide	30	5	4	21	26	57	−31	14	

Updated to match(es) played on unknown. Source: rsssf.com
Rules for classification: 1) points; 2) goal difference; 3) number of goals scored.
(C) Champions; (R) Relegated

== Results ==
Home \ Away	AG	AH	BD	BG	BL	CA	FE	HW	LS	ML	NR	PR	SM	SO	SS	WW
Adelaide Giants	—	2–1	0–0	1–0	3–2	1–0	1–3	3–1	0–0	0–1	4–1	1–0	2–0	3–1	0–1	1–2
Adelaide Hawks	0–3	—	2–0	1–1	1–3	1–1	3–2	0–5	1–2	2–0	0–1	4–0	0–2	0–1	1–2	0–0
Blacktown Demons	1–5	4–0	—	1–2	2–2	0–2	1–1	3–1	0–1	0–2	1–2	0–0	2–2	1–4	1–0	0–1
Brisbane Gladiators	3–1	2–1	2–1	—	1–0	0–0	2–0	1–2	0–0	4–0	1–1	1–2	1–1	3–0	2–0	1–0
Brisbane Lions	2–1	3–1	0–1	1–0	—	1–0	4–0	0–0	0–0	2–0	0–1	2–1	2–0	1–1	4–3	1–1
Canberra Arrows	0–0	1–2	2–2	3–0	2–3	—	5–0	1–5	0–1	0–0	4–1	1–0	2–2	2–1	2–0	2–0
Footscray Eagles	1–1	1–1	2–0	1–0	2–0	3–1	—	2–2	2–1	1–2	0–1	2–1	1–2	1–1	1–0	1–1
Heidelberg Warriors	1–2	2–0	3–1	2–0	2–2	1–1	2–0	—	1–0	1–1	1–2	2–3	0–0	1–0	0–1	0–3
Leichhardt Strikers	3–0	1–0	3–2	2–2	0–0	4–0	2–0	2–2	—	1–1	2–1	1–1	1–1	2–2	0–1	1–0
Marconi-Datsun Leopards	1–4	1–0	0–1	1–1	2–1	0–2	1–3	3–1	0–2	—	1–2	1–0	1–1	2–1	1–0	1–1
Newcastle KB Raiders	2–2	4–2	1–1	0–2	1–1	0–1	3–0	1–2	4–1	2–0	—	4–0	0–0	1–2	1–2	1–1
Preston Rams	3–0	2–0	2–3	1–1	1–1	0–1	3–0	0–2	3–1	0–0	3–1	—	1–1	3–1	0–2	6–0
South Melbourne Gunners	0–0	5–0	2–1	0–2	1–0	1–0	2–1	2–1	4–1	1–0	2–0	2–0	—	1–1	1–3	1–0
Sydney Olympians	3–1	3–1	1–0	1–1	3–1	0–2	0–0	2–1	1–3	2–0	1–1	2–1	2–2	—	2–2	2–1
Sydney Slickers (C)	5–3	1–0	1–1	1–1	1–1	3–2	3–0	1–0	3–0	5–0	4–1	2–0	1–1	5–4	—	1–0
Wollongong Wolves	4–1	2–1	1–1	0–0	1–1	0–1	2–1	3–4	1–1	4–0	0–0	2–2	1–1	3–1	0–5	—

Source: OzFootball
Legend: Blue = home team win; Yellow = draw; Red = away team win.

== Individual awards ==
- Player of the Year: Bobby Russell (Adelaide Giants)
- U-21 Player of the Year: David Mitchell (Adelaide Giants)
- Top Scorer(s): Gary Cole (Heidelberg Warriors – 16 goals)
- Coach of the Year: Eddie Thomson (Sydney Slickers)

== See also ==
- 1981 NSL Cup
