= Glenn Ahearn =

Australian soccer player

Personal information
- Full name: Glenn Ahearn
- Date of birth: 13 December 1962 (age 63)
- Place of birth: Australia
- Position: Goalkeeper

Senior career*
Years	Team	Apps	(Gls)
1982	Sydney City	1	(0)
1983	Brisbane City	0	(0)
Total		1	(0)

International career
1981	Australia U20	4	(0)
1981	Australia	2	(0)
- * Club domestic league appearances and goals as of 8 August 1982

Glenn Ahearn (born 13 December 1962) is an Australian former professional soccer player who previously played as a goalkeeper for Hakoah Sydney City East in the National Soccer League.

== Club career ==
=== Hakoah Sydney City East ===
Ahearn made his senior debut with the Hakoah Sydney City East on 8 August 1982 against St George in a 1–0 win.

== International career ==
Ahearn began his international career by playing with the Australia national under-20 soccer team in the 1981 FIFA World Youth Championship. He also played two full international games against Indonesia and Taiwan both played in 1981.

== Career statistics ==
=== Club ===
Appearances and goals by club, season and competition
Club	Season	League			Cup		Other		Total	
Club	Season	Division	Apps	Goals	Apps	Goals	Apps	Goals	Apps	Goals
Hakoah Sydney City East	1982	National Soccer League	1	0	—	—	—	—	1	0
Hakoah Sydney City East	Total		1	0	—	—	—	—	1	0
Brisbane City	1983	National Soccer League	0	0	—	—	—	—	0	0
Brisbane City	Total		0	0	—	—	—	—	0	0
Career total			1	0	—	—	—	—	1	0

=== International ===
National team	Year	Competitive		Friendly		Total	
National team	Year	Apps	Goals	Apps	Goals	Apps	Goals
Australia	1981	2	0	0	0	2	0
