= 1982 National Soccer League =

Australian soccer season

National Soccer League
- Season: 1982
- Dates: 13 February – 5 September 1982
- Champions: Sydney City; 3rd title
- Matches: 240
- Goals: 701 (2.92 per match)
- Top goalscorer: John Kosmina (23 goals)
- Best goalkeeper: Jeff Olver (10 clean sheets)
- Biggest home win: Brisbane Lions 7–1 Footscray JUST (7 March 1982); Marconi Fairfield 7–1 APIA Leichhardt (6 June 1982)
- Biggest away win: Preston Makedonia 0–5 Sydney City (6 June 1982)
- Highest scoring: Brisbane Lions 7–1 Footscray JUST (7 March 1982); Marconi Fairfield 7–1 APIA Leichhardt (6 June 1982)
- Highest attendance: 12,186; Sydney Olympic 2–0 APIA Leichhardt (4 April 1982)
- Lowest attendance: 400; Brisbane Lions 1–0 Canberra City (5 September 1982)
- Total attendance: 784,724
- Average attendance: 3,270

The 1982 National Soccer League was the sixth season of the National Soccer League, the former top-flight league in Australia. Sydney City won the championship for the third consecutive season.

== Teams ==
Sixteen teams competed in the league.

=== Stadiums and locations ===
Note: Table lists in alphabetical order.

Team	Location	Stadium	Capacity
Adelaide City	Adelaide (Norwood)	Olympic Sports Field	8,000
APIA Leichhardt	Sydney (Leichhardt)	Lambert Park	7,000
Brisbane City	Brisbane (Newmarket)	Spencer Park	5,000
Brisbane Lions	Brisbane (Inala)	Lions Stadium	5,000
Canberra City	Canberra	Canberra Stadium	25,011
Footscray JUST	Melbourne (Preston)	Schintler Reserve	?
Heidelberg United	Melbourne (Collingwood)	Olympic Village	12,000
Marconi Fairfield	Sydney (Smithfield)	Marconi Stadium	9,000
Newcastle KB United	Newcastle	Newcastle International Sports Centre	30,000
Preston Makedonia	Melbourne (Fitzroy)	B.T. Connor Reserve	4,000
South Melbourne	Melbourne (St Kilda West)	Middle Park	18,000
St George-Budapest	Sydney (Mortdale)	St George Stadium	12,000
Sydney City	Sydney (Bondi)	ES Marks Athletics Field	8,000
Sydney Olympic	Sydney (Waterloo)	Pratten Park	15,000
West Adelaide	Adelaide (City of Adelaide)	Hindmarsh Stadium	16,500
Wollongong City	Wollongong	Wollongong Showground	22,000

== League table ==
Pos	Team	Pld	W	D	L	GF	GA	GD	Pts	Relegation
1	Sydney City (C)	30	20	5	5	68	28	+40	45	Qualification to Finals series (Note: The Finals series was not considered the championship for the 1982 National Soccer League.)
2	St George-Budapest	30	14	8	8	47	40	+7	36	Qualification to Finals series
3	Wollongong City	30	16	3	11	43	46	−3	35	Qualification to Finals series
4	Heidelberg United	30	13	8	9	42	37	+5	34	Qualification to Finals series
5	Preston Makedonia	30	12	10	8	45	41	+4	34	
6	South Melbourne	30	11	9	10	46	37	+9	31	
7	APIA Leichhardt	30	12	7	11	49	54	−5	31	
8	Sydney Olympic	30	12	6	12	52	42	+10	30	
9	West Adelaide	30	10	8	12	44	40	+4	28	
10	Marconi Fairfield	30	12	4	14	44	43	+1	28	
11	Brisbane Lions	30	10	8	12	39	42	−3	28	
12	Newcastle KB United	30	10	7	13	43	52	−9	27	
13	Adelaide City	30	6	12	12	36	44	−8	24	
14	Footscray JUST	30	5	14	11	34	46	−12	24	
15	Canberra City	30	7	10	13	37	54	−17	24	
16	Brisbane City	30	5	11	14	32	55	−23	21	

Source: rsssf.com
Rules for classification: 1) points; 2) goal difference; 3) number of goals scored.
(C) Champions

== Results ==
Home \ Away	ADE	API	BRC	BRL	CAN	FOO	HEI	MAR	NKU	PRE	SOU	STG	SYC	SYO	WES	WOL
Adelaide City	—	1–1	2–0	0–2	1–1	0–0	3–2	0–0	2–2	0–0	1–1	3–0	0–0	2–3	0–0	3–0
APIA Leichhardt	4–1	—	1–1	1–0	3–0	0–2	1–1	2–0	3–2	4–2	3–2	3–2	1–4	0–3	0–0	2–2
Brisbane City	1–1	1–1	—	2–2	1–3	0–0	2–2	2–0	1–1	1–2	1–1	2–2	2–1	1–1	4–1	3–1
Brisbane Lions	2–0	0–4	1–3	—	1–0	7–1	1–0	0–1	4–1	2–3	0–2	1–1	0–1	1–1	2–1	2–0
Canberra City	3–1	2–2	1–0	2–2	—	2–2	1–3	2–0	1–3	1–1	0–4	1–2	2–0	2–1	1–2	0–1
Footscray JUST	2–2	0–1	2–0	1–1	2–2	—	1–1	1–1	3–1	0–1	1–1	2–2	0–2	1–1	2–2	1–2
Heidelberg United	2–1	3–2	1–0	2–0	1–2	3–3	—	2–1	2–0	0–0	2–0	3–1	1–0	2–2	1–0	0–2
Marconi Fairfield	1–0	7–1	4–0	1–1	2–2	0–2	1–0	—	3–1	4–1	2–1	3–1	1–2	2–3	0–2	1–2
Newcastle KB United	2–0	1–0	0–0	3–1	4–2	1–0	2–2	2–0	—	1–1	2–2	1–2	2–2	0–3	1–2	1–3
Preston Makedonia	2–1	2–0	3–1	1–1	5–1	3–0	0–0	4–1	1–2	—	1–1	0–1	0–5	4–1	1–1	2–1
South Melbourne	0–3	3–1	4–0	2–1	1–1	3–2	0–1	3–1	2–1	0–1	—	0–0	2–2	2–1	2–2	3–0
St George-Budapest	2–2	3–1	1–0	5–1	1–0	1–1	2–1	2–0	3–0	2–0	2–1	—	0–1	1–2	2–0	2–1
Sydney City	6–1	0–1	5–2	3–0	3–0	1–0	0–1	3–1	4–0	1–1	2–1	3–1	—	2–1	5–2	3–3
Sydney Olympic	1–3	2–0	5–0	0–1	0–0	3–0	3–2	1–2	1–4	2–2	1–2	4–0	1–2	—	3–1	0–1
West Adelaide	2–1	5–2	3–0	0–0	2–2	0–1	4–0	0–1	1–2	5–1	1–0	1–1	0–2	0–1	—	4–0
Wollongong City	2–1	2–4	3–1	0–2	3–0	2–1	2–1	0–3	1–0	1–0	1–0	2–2	1–3	2–1	2–0	—

Source: OzFootball
Legend: Blue = home team win; Yellow = draw; Red = away team win.

== Season statistics ==
=== Top scorers ===
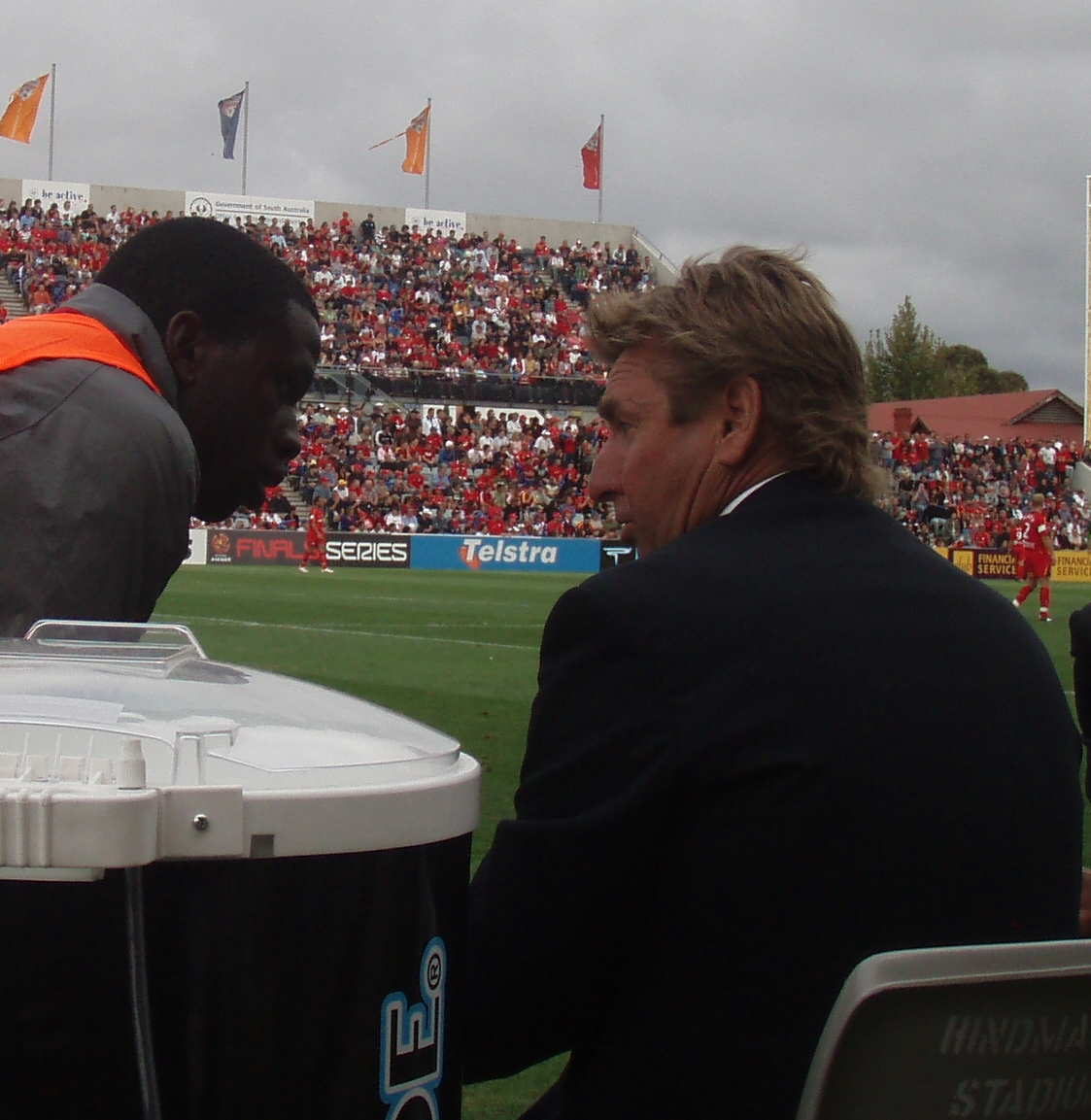
John Kosmina scored 23 goals for Sydney City.

Rank	Player	Club	Goals
1	(Australia) John Kosmina	Sydney City	23
2	(Australia) Charlie Egan	South Melbourne	20
3	(Socialist Federal Republic of Yugoslavia) Dez Marton	St George-Budapest	18
4	(Australia) Mark Koussas	Sydney Olympic	16
4	(Australia) Phil O'Connor	Wollongong City	16
6	(Scotland) Graham Honeyman	West Adelaide	14
6	(Australia) Marshall Soper	APIA Leichhardt	14
8	(Australia) Jim Campbell	Heidelberg United	12
8	(Australia) Gary Cole	Heidelberg United	12
8	(Australia) Sebastian Giampaolo	APIA Leichhardt	12
8	(Australia) Mark Jankovics	Marconi Fairfield	12

==== Hat-tricks ====
Player	For	Against	Result	Date
(Scotland) Graham Honeyman	West Adelaide	Wollongong City	4–0 (H)	28 February 1982
(Australia) Mark Koussas	Sydney Olympic	Brisbane City	5–0 (H)	18 April 1982
(Australia) John Kosmina	Sydney City	St George-Budapest	3–1 (H)	2 May 1982
(Australia) John Kosmina	Sydney City	Marconi Fairfield	3–1 (H)	16 May 1982
(England) Craig Johnston	Newcastle KB United	Brisbane Lions	3–1 (H)	26 June 1982
(Australia) John Kosmina^{4}	Sydney City	Brisbane City	5–2 (H)	4 July 1982
(Australia) Peter Katholos	Sydney Olympic	APIA Leichhardt	3–0 (A)	11 July 1982
(Australia) John Kosmina	Sydney City	West Adelaide	5–2 (H)	5 September 1982

Notes

^{4} Player scored 4 goals

=== Clean sheets ===
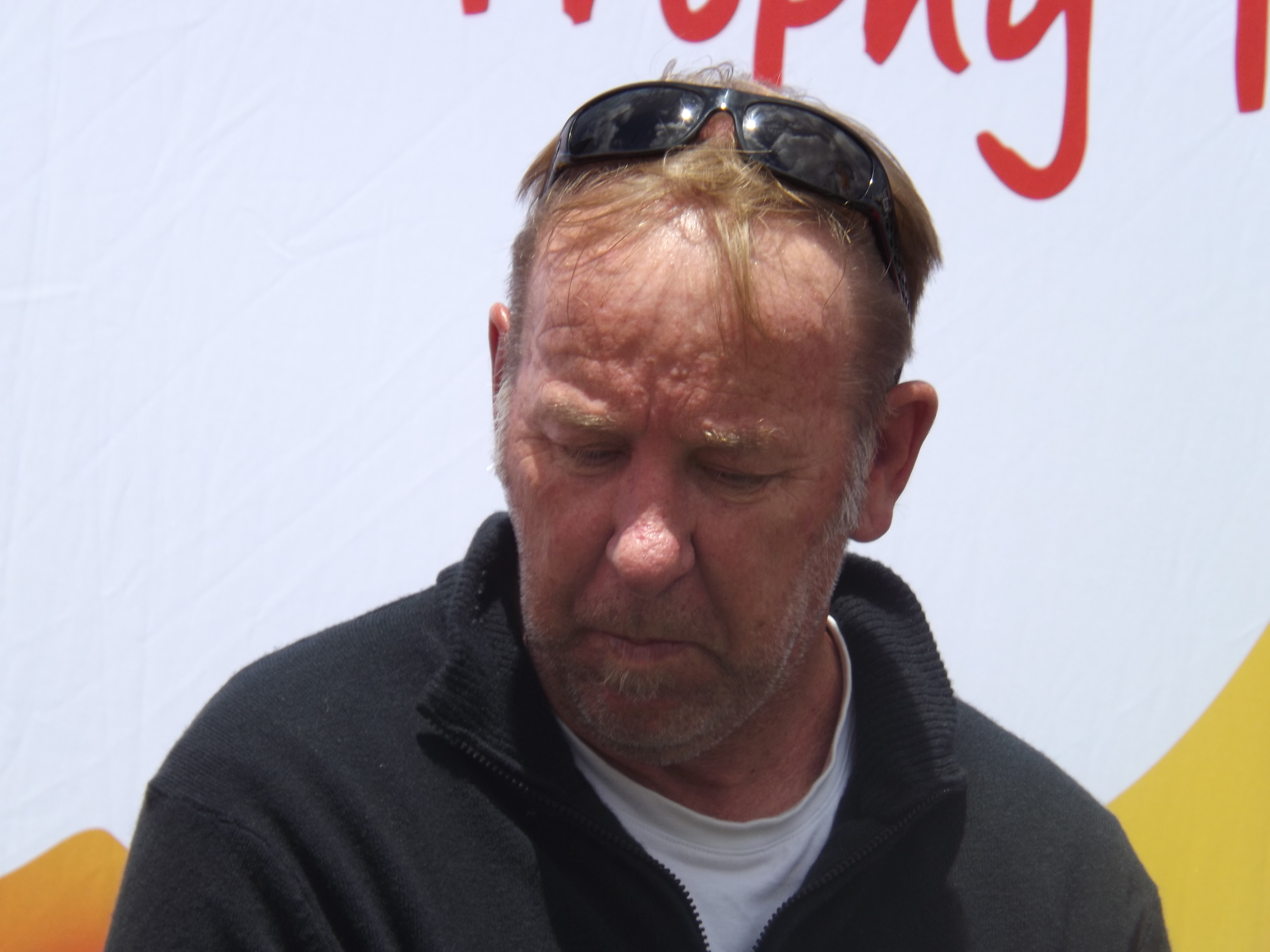
Jeff Olver kept 10 clean sheets for Heidelberg United.

Rank	Player	Club	Clean sheets
1	(Australia) Jeff Olver	Heidelberg United	10
2	(Australia) Todd Clarke	Sydney City	9
3	(Australia) Martyn Crook	West Adelaide	8
3	(Australia) Mike Fraser	St George-Budapest	8
5	(Scotland) Bobby Ferguson	Adelaide City	7
5	(Australia) Allan Maher	Marconi Fairfield	7
7	(Australia) Milutin Ciric	Footscray JUST	5
7	(Australia) Jim Preston	Wollongong City	5
7	(Australia) Peter Wilson	Sydney Olympic	5
7	(Australia) Greg Woodhouse	APIA Leichhardt	5

== Awards ==
Award	Winner	Club
National Soccer League Player of the Year	(Australia) Peter Katholos	Sydney Olympic
National Soccer League Under 21 Player of the Year	(Australia) David Lowe	Newcastle KB United
National Soccer League Coach of the Year	(Australia) Frank Arok	St George-Budapest
