= 1981 NSL Cup =

National Soccer League Cup

Tournament details
- Country: Australia
- Dates: 21 March – 20 September 1981
- Teams: 36

Final positions
- Champions: Brisbane Lions (1st title)
- Runners-up: Heidelberg United

Tournament statistics
- Matches played: 35
- Goals scored: 114 (3.26 per match)
- Attendance: 93,903 (2,683 per match)

The 1981 NSL Cup was the fifth edition of the NSL Cup, which was the main national association football knockout cup competition in Australia.

Marconi Fairfield were the defending champions, having defeated Heidelberg United to win their first title in the previous year's final, but they were eliminated in the semi-finals by Brisbane Lions.

Brisbane Lions defeated West Adelaide 3–1 in the final to win their first NSL Cup title.

== Teams ==
The NSL Cup was a knockout competition with 36 teams taking part all trying to reach the Final in September 1981. The competition consisted of the 16 teams from the National Soccer League plus 20 teams from their respective top division state leagues.

Round	Main date	Number of fixtures	Clubs remaining
First round	Sunday 22 March 1981	16	36 → 20
Second round	Wednesday 6 May 1981	10	20 → 10
Third round	Tuesday 16 June 1981	2	10 → 8
Quarter-finals	Wednesday 17 June 1981	4	8 → 4
Semi-finals	Wednesday 5 August 1981	2	4 → 2
Final	Sunday 20 September 1981	1	2 → 1

== First round ==
8 February 1981	Brisbane City (1)	1–0	Mount Gravatt (2)	Brisbane
	Wilkinson 38'	Report		Stadium: Perry Park

8 February 1981	Adelaide City (1)	4–2	Adelaide Croatia (2)	Adelaide
	Mitchell 17'; Marocchi 19'; B. Nyskohus 76'; Northcote 80'	Report	Williams 60'; Caggiano 64'	Stadium: Hindmarsh Stadium

4 March 1981	St Kilda Hakoah (2)	3–2	Brunswick United Juventus (2)	Melbourne
	Dosen ?'; French ?'; Fantoma 84' (o.g.)	Report	Ristovski ?'; Incantalupo ?'	Stadium: Olympic Park; Attendance: 3,500; Referee: Dennis Voutsinas

4 March 1981	Preston Makedonia (1)	3–1	Footscray JUST (1)	Melbourne
	Ollerton 73', 85' (pen.); Brown 81'	Report	Cozzella 68'	Stadium: Olympic Park; Attendance: 3,500; Referee: Chris Bambridge

11 March 1981	Essendon Croatia (2)	3–1	Green Gully Ajax (2)	Melbourne
	Gilder 47', ?'; Mitten 79'	Report	MacLeod 48' (pen.)	Stadium: Olympic Park; Attendance: 6,300; Referee: Jim Fearn

11 March 1981	Heidelberg United (1)	2–0	South Melbourne (1)	Melbourne
	Bozikas 52'; Selemidis 71'	Report		Stadium: Olympic Park; Attendance: 6,300; Referee: Dennis Voutsinas

11 March 1981	West Adelaide (1)	3–0	Para Hills (2)	Adelaide
	Brown 53'; Tymczyszyn 81' (pen.); Pillans 85'	Report		Stadium: Hindmarsh Stadium

21 March 1981	Wollongong Wolves (1)	3–0	Downer Olympic (2)	Wollongong
	Lathan 30'; Campbell 18'; Adam 90' (pen.)	Report		Stadium: Memorial Park; Attendance: 815; Referee: Ken Small

22 March 1981	Canberra City (1)	2–1	Newcastle KB United (1)	Canberra
	Valeri 48', 64'	Report	Mountford 29'	Stadium: Bruce Stadium; Attendance: 3,025; Referee: Tim Davies

22 March 1981	Sydney City (1)	3–0	Blacktown City (1)	Newcastle
	Boden 28' (pen.), 37', 86'	Report		Stadium: Newcastle International Sports Centre; Attendance: 1,310; Referee: Alf Rodway

22 March 1981	Weston Bears (2)	1–0	Rapid Wrest Point (2)	Newcastle
	Miller 90+5'	Report		Stadium: Macquarie Field; Attendance: 2,000

22 March 1981	Edgeworth Eagles (2)	1–2	Sydney Olympic (1)	Newcastle
	Kemp 62'	Report	Cross 55'; Raskoupoulos 87'	Stadium: Macquarie Field; Attendance: 2,000; Referee: Alf Rodway

29 March 1981	APIA Leichhardt (1)	3–2	Auburn (2)	Sydney
	Morsello 19'; O'Connor 31'; Soper 76'	Report	Allen 1'; Hill 51'	Stadium: Everley Park; Referee: Richard Lorenc

29 March 1981	Marconi Fairfield (1)	2–1	Melita Eagles (2)	Sydney
	Jankovics 15', 62'	Report	Allan 51'	Stadium: Everley Park; Referee: Gary Power

29 March 1981	Canterbury Marrickville (2)	1–0	St George-Budapest (1)	Sydney
	Brown 39'	Report		Stadium: Seymour Shaw Park

29 April 1981	Townsville United (2)	0–3	Brisbane Lions (1)	Townsville
		Report	Ferris 32', 72'; Whalley 89' (o.g.)	Stadium: Townsville Sports Reserve; Attendance: 1,400; Referee: A. Barrell

== Second round ==
22 March 1981	Adelaide City (1)	3–1	Olympic Kingsway (2)	Adelaide
	Mitchell 22', 55'; Villani 35'	Report	(unknown) ?', ?'	Stadium: Hindmarsh Stadium; Attendance: 6,328; Referee: Bobby Kerr

22 March 1981	West Adelaide (1)	3–2	Cumberland United (2)	Adelaide
	McGachey 48'; Manecas 56'; Norris 86'	Report	Mahoney 33'	Stadium: Hindmarsh Stadium; Attendance: 6,328; Referee: Barry Harwood

25 March 1981	St Kilda Hakoah (2)	3–1	Essendon Croatia (2)	Melbourne
	French 69'; McClunie 81'; Webster 90'	Report	Murphy 22'	Stadium: Olympic Park; Attendance: 6,000; Referee: Jack Johnston

25 March 1981	Heidelberg United (1)	1–1 (a.e.t.) (5–3 p)	Preston Makedonia (1)	Melbourne
	Cole 63'	Report	McMillan 52'	Stadium: Olympic Park; Attendance: 6,000; Referee: Bob Mee
	Penalties
	Cole (penalty scored); Yzendoorn (penalty scored); Taylor (penalty scored); Campbell (penalty scored); Rooney (penalty scored)		(penalty scored) Ollerton; (penalty missed) Flavell; (penalty scored) Petrovski; (penalty scored) Lucchesi

6 May 1981	Marconi Fairfield (1)	1–0	Canterbury Marickville (2)	Sydney
	Byrne 62'	Report		Stadium: Marconi Oval; Attendance: 2,000; Referee: Arthur Owens

6 May 1981	Sydney City (1)	1–0 (a.e.t.)	Weston Bears (2)	Sydney
	Boden 116'	Report		Stadium: Marconi Oval; Attendance: 2,000; Referee: Ken Allen

6 May 1981	Wollongong City (1)	2–4 (a.e.t.)	APIA Leichhardt (1)	Wollongong
	McBreen 77'; Tredinnick 90'	Report	O'Connor 75'; Soper 89', 119'; Kafka 100'	Stadium: Woonona Oval; Referee: Tony Boskovic

6 May 1981	Brisbane Lions (1)	2–0	Grange Thistle (2)	Brisbane
	Cameron 17' (o.g.); Hermiston 32'	Report		Stadium: Perry Park; Attendance: 300; Referee: Jack Wood

8 June 1981	Canberra City (1)	2–4	Sydney Olympic (1)	Canberra
	Gibson ?'; Maclaren 63'	Report	Koussas 8', 40'; Wilson ?'; Rowden 25'	Stadium: Bruce Stadium; Attendance: 4,300; Referee: Tim Davies

8 June 1981	Brisbane City (1)	3–0	Mareeba United (2)	Brisbane
	P. Wilkinson 11', 44'; McVeigh 83'	Report		Stadium: Spencer Park; Attendance: 1,000; Referee: Col Amos

== Third round ==
27 May 1981	Marconi Fairfield (1)	2–2 (a.e.t.) (5–4 p)	Sydney City (1)	Sydney
	Sharne ?'; Krncevic ?'	Report	Boden 46', ?'	Stadium: Marconi Oval; Referee: Richard Lorenc

16 June 1981	APIA Leichhardt (1)	2–1	Sydney Olympic (1)	Sydney
	O'Connor 35'; Soper 72'	Report	Cotton 78'	Stadium: Sydney Sports Ground; Attendance: 5,765; Referee: Chris Bambridge

== Quarter-finals ==
3 June 1981	Brisbane Lions (1)	1–0	St Kilda Hakoah (2)	Brisbane
	Ferris 25'	Report		Stadium: Richlands Stadium; Attendance: 600; Referee: Dave Nugent

17 June 1981	Heidelberg United (1)	0–1	Adelaide City (1)	Melbourne
		Report	Fashanu 87'	Stadium: Olympic Park; Attendance: 2,000; Referee: Tony Boskovic

17 June 1981	West Adelaide (1)	4–2	Brisbane City (1)	Adelaide
	Lorenzoni 18'; Manecas 57', ?'; Smythe 88'	Report	Caldwell 11'; Hamilton 48'	Stadium: Hindmarsh Stadium; Attendance: 1,800; Referee: Jim Rossis

8 July 1981	APIA Leichhardt (1)	1–3	Marconi Fairfield (1)	Sydney
	Morsello 65'	Report	Krncevic 12', 63', 89'	Stadium: St George Stadium; Attendance: 3,800; Referee: Henry Witschge

== Semi-finals ==
29 July 1981	West Adelaide (1)	1–0	Adelaide City (1)	Adelaide
	Bozanic 62'	Report		Stadium: Hindmarsh Stadium; Attendance: 6,200; Referee: Barry Harwood

5 August 1981	Marconi Fairfield (1)	2–3	Brisbane Lions (1)	Sydney
	Jankovics ?', ?'	Report	Bennett 46'; Williamson 59', 62'	Stadium: Marconi Oval; Attendance: 3,200; Referee: Peter Rampley

== Final ==
20 September 1981
15:00 AEST

Brisbane Lions	3–1	West Adelaide
Daunt 4'; Ferris 75'; Williamson 87' (pen.)	Report	Topaz 82'

Canberra Stadium, Canberra
Attendance: 6,132
Referee: Chris Bambridge
