= Grant Lee =

Australian footballer (born 2001)

Personal information
- Date of birth: October 19, 1961 (age 65)
- Place of birth: Australia
- Position: Midfielder

Senior career*
Years	Team	Apps	(Gls)
1981–1983	Sydney City	7	(1)
1983	Newcastle KB United	16	(2)
1984–1986	Sydney City	74	(15)
1988–1995	Sydney Olympic	154	(15)

International career
1981	Australia	2	(0)

Managerial career
- 2013–2016: Sydney Olympic
- * Club domestic league appearances and goals

Grant Lee (born 19 October 1961) is an Australian former soccer player who played as a midfielder.

== Early life ==
Lee was described as "first rose to prominence as a member of the magnificent World Youth squad of 1981 who defeated the world champions, Argentina, in October of that year".

== Playing career ==
Lee played for Australian side Sydney Olympic FC, helping the club win the league.

== Style of play ==
Lee mainly operated as a midfielder.

== Managerial career ==
Lee has been described as "built a fine record of youth development through coaching stints at the Australian Institute of Sport, Parramatta Power, Sydney United and Sydney FC".

== Personal life ==
Lee was the son of Frank Lee.
