= Willie Murray (footballer, born 1954) =

Scottish footballer

Personal information
- Date of birth: 28 August 1954 (age 72)
- Place of birth: Edinburgh, Scotland
- Position: Right winger

Youth career
- Salvesen's Boys Club
- 1970–1974: Hibernian

Senior career*
Years	Team	Apps	(Gls)
1974–1980	Hibernian	77	(7)
1980–1981	Cowdenbeath	3	(0)
1981–1984	Sydney City	78	(14)
1986	Wollongong Wolves	14	(1)
Total		172	(22)
- * Club domestic league appearances and goals

Willie Murray (born 28 August 1954) is a Scottish former footballer, who played for Hibernian, Cowdenbeath and Sydney City.
