= John Spanos =

Australian former soccer player (born 1961)

Personal information
- Date of birth: 4 January 1961 (age 65)
- Place of birth: Leeds, England
- Position: Defender

Youth career
- Ascot
- 1977: Morley-Windmills

Senior career*
Years	Team	Apps	(Gls)
1978	Adelaide City	0	(0)
1980–1982	Sydney City	84	(8)
1983	Heidelberg United	30	(0)
1984	Marconi Stallions	23	(0)
1985	Blacktown City	5	(0)
1989–1993	Port Adelaide	?	(?)
1994	Adelaide Cobras	7	(0)

International career
1979	Australia U20	?	(?)
1980	Australia	1	(0)
- * Club domestic league appearances and goals

John Spanos (born 4 January 1961) is an Australian former soccer player who played in the National Soccer League.

== Early life and family ==
Spanos was born in Leeds, England. His grandfather had emigrated to England from Greece.

== Playing career ==
=== Club career ===
Spanos played junior football for Ascot and Morley-Windmills before stints with Sydney City, Heidelberg United, Marconi and Blacktown City in the National Soccer League.

=== International career ===
Spanos made one appearance for Australia against Indonesia in 1980.
