= Marshall Soper =

Australian soccer player

Personal information
- Full name: Marshall Soper
- Date of birth: 12 May 1960 (age 66)
- Place of birth: Newcastle, Australia
- Position: Striker

Senior career*
Years	Team	Apps	(Gls)
1981–1982	A.P.I.A. Leichhardt	49	(26)
1983–1988	Sydney Olympic	127	(48)
1988	Wollongong City	9	(10)
1989	Sydney Olympic	18	(6)
1989–1990	Parramatta Eagles	121	(42)
1991	Penang FA	30	(11)
1992–1993	Parramatta Eagles	24	(8)
1994–1995	Marconi Fairfield	13	(11)
1995	Perak	30	(18)
1996	Bonnyrigg White Eagles		

International career^{‡}
1983–1986	Australia	42	(9)

Managerial career
- 1998: Fairfield Bulls
- 2001: Wollongong United
- 2014-2015: DRB-Hicom F.C.
- 2017: Parramatta FC
- * Club domestic league appearances and goals as of 17:30, 14 August 2010 (UTC) ‡ National team caps and goals as of 17:30, 14 August 2010 (UTC)

Marshall Soper, born 12 May 1960, is a former football (soccer) and Australia International.

== Career ==
A bustling but skilful centre-forward with a reputation for hot-headedness, he was originally from the Hunter region, 2 hours north of Sydney. In 1981 he was signed by APIA Leichhardt, helping them win the 1982 NSL Cup. In 1983 he was signed by their local rivals Sydney Olympic where he would spend the next 7 seasons and where he would make his name as a player, he scored 60 goals in 151 appearances in all competitions for the club between 1983 and 1989, in the process becoming a household name and star for the Socceroos. He suffered a knee cruciate ligament injury while playing for the club.

After finishing up with Olympic, Soper also played an important role during a successful period at Parramatta FC, helping the club win the 1991 NSL Cup.

At a national level, Soper played 29 times for the Socceroos, scoring four goals, mostly in "XI" matches against club teams.

In 1991, he top scored (11 goals) for Penang FA in the Malaysian Premier League.

In 1995, he signed for Malaysian side Perak.

Soper trialled with Arsenal FC.

In 2003, he signed for Australian side Mingara Lakers.

In later years he coached the Fairfield Bulls and Illawarra Lions.

In late 2010 it was announced that he would become a coach for Newcastle United Jets. Soper then moved to a team in the Illawarra Premier League the Coniston Lions FC to become their club coaching director before accepting the post at his former club Perak FA as their academy head coach in April 2013.

Soper was head coach of Malaysian club DRB-Hicom F.C. between December 2014 to February 2015.

He also became head coach of his former club, Parramatta FC, during the 2017 NPL NSW season.
