= Colin Bennett (soccer) =

Australian soccer player

Col Bennett
Personal information
- Full name: Colin Bennett
- Date of birth: 12 September 1950 (age 76)
- Place of birth: Sydney, Australia
- Position: Defender

Senior career*
Years	Team	Apps	(Gls)
1970–1974	Sutherland	150	(3)
1975–1976	APIA Leichhardt	65	
1977–1983	Brisbane Lions	154	(14)
1984	Rochedale Rovers	20	
1986	Brisbane Lions	1	(0)

International career
1975–1978	Australia	32	(2)
- * Club domestic league appearances and goals as of 08:57, 19 August 2009 (UTC)

Col Bennett (born 12 September 1950) is a retired Australian soccer player. He is member of the Football Federation Australia - Football Hall of Fame.

== Playing career ==
=== Club career ===
Bennett played Sutherland in the New South Wales State League in the early 1970s. 70 - 74

APIA 75 - 76

In 1977, he joined the Brisbane Lions for the inaugural season of the National Soccer League on 2 February 1977 for a fee of $7,000. Bennett played every NSL game for the club between 1977 and 1983.

=== International career ===
Bennett represented Australia in 32 full international matches and 23 B-international matches, and is designated as Socceroo #239. His first match for Australia was in a B-international against a travelling Legia Warsaw team at the Sydney Sports Ground in February 1975. His full international debut came in August of the same year against China in Melbourne. After being involved in Australia's failed qualification for the 1978 FIFA World Cup, Bennett played his last game for the Socceroos against Greece in June 1978.

== Honours ==
Individual

- Football Federation Australia Hall of Fame - Medal of Excellence - 2003 Inductee
- Coached Nudgee College 1st XI Football Side to the Premiership in 2013–2014
