= ES Marks Athletics Field =

Sports venue in Kensington, New South Wales

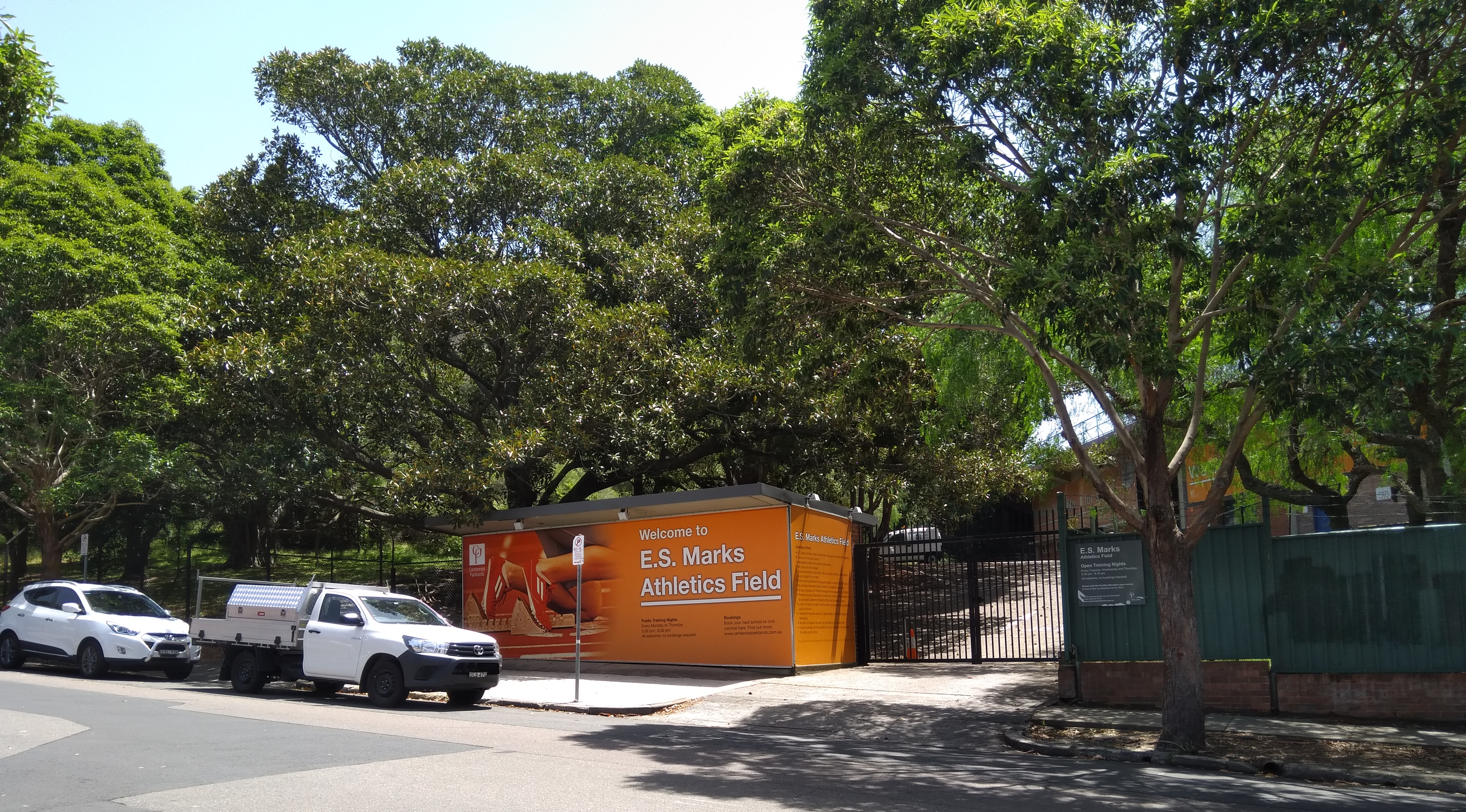
- Entrance on Boronia Street
- Interactive map of ES Marks Athletics Field
- Address: Anzac Parade
- Location: Kensington
- Coordinates: 33°54′11″S 151°13′20″E
- Owner: Government of New South Wales
- Operator: Centennial Park & Moore Park Trust
- Capacity: 8,000
- Type: Athletics field

Construction
- Opened: 1906

ES Marks Athletics Field is located in Kensington, Sydney, Australia. It was built in 1906 as Sydney Athletics Field. In 1947 a cinder track was installed and it was renamed ES Marks Athletics Field after athletics administrator Ernest Samuel Marks. In 1956 a grandstand was built. In the early 1960s, it hosted the Australian Athletics National Titles, however as the cinders track aged and alternate synthetic tracks at other venues were built, the facility fell out of favour. The stadium has a covered grandstand that seats 1,000, in addition to other uncovered seats.

In the 1970s the track was resurfaced and electronic timing installed. The national championships returned in 1980. The New South Wales Waratahs and Sydney Roosters have used it at various times as training ground. In the lead up to the 2000 Sydney Olympics, the field was used by the United States national athletics team.

For a number of years Hakoah Sydney, Sydney FC Prague and Yugal soccer clubs used the field as their home ground.

A stop on the CBD and South East Light Rail is named after the venue.

In 2021, work commenced on upgrading the venue with a temporary closure of the venue to commence on September 6 for major construction works.
