= B.T. Connor Reserve =

Football stadium in Victoria, Australia

- The main pitch in November 2026
- Interactive map of B.T. Connor Reserve
- Location: Reservoir, Victoria, Australia
- Coordinates: 37°42′18″S 144°58′50″E
- Owner: City of Darebin
- Operator: City of Darebin; Preston Lions FC
- Capacity: 6,500 (800 seated)
- Surface: Grass

Tenant
- Preston Lions

B.T. Connor Reserve (also commonly known as Genis Steel Stadium due to naming rights) is the home of the Preston Lions football club. It currently has room for about 6,500 spectators with 800 seats.

B.T. Connor Reserve has four football (soccer) pitches, and is where the juniors and the women's teams of the Preston Lions train and play their matches.

In December 2023, the stadium became the temporary home ground for Melbourne City in the A-League Women, with their usual home ground unavailable due to ongoing renovations.

In March 2025, Preston Lions hosted South Melbourne at B.T Connor Reserve, with a record-breaking 9,036 spectators walking through the gates.

== Redevelopment ==
The new pavilion at B.T. Connor Reserve will feature four change rooms equipped with toilets and showers, and a new community space for social purposes.

The club's facilities at B.T Connor Reserve will undergo a $3 million re-development which will coincide with the start of the proposed National Second Division. The new-look ground will include upgraded change rooms, medical facilities, a purpose-built social area with a new bar and kitchen, undercover seating for fans, media facilities, disability-friendly access to the pavilion and improved lighting.

== Women's international soccer ==
Game	Date	Team	Result	Team	Attendance	Part of
1	16 July 2023	Jamaica	1–0	Morocco		Friendly
