= List of NSL Cup finals =

The National Soccer League Cup, commonly known as the NSL Cup, was a knockout competition in Australian soccer, organised by the Australian Soccer Association (now Football Australia). The record for the most wins was held by Adelaide City with 3 victories. The cup had been won by the same team in two consecutive years only by Brisbane City in the first two editions of the cup.

== History ==
The winners of the first tournament was Brisbane City, who then won it again the next year and to be the only team in competition history to win consecutive NSL Cups.

== Results ==
Key to list of winners
(R)	Replay
(1st)	First leg of a Final
(2nd)	Second leg of a Final
*	Match went to extra time
†	Match decided via a penalty shoot-out after extra time
‡	Winning team won the Double
§	Winning team won the Treble
(#)	Number of trophy won by club

- The "Season" column refers to the season the competition was held, and wikilinks to the article about that season.
- The wikilinks in the "Score" column point to the article about that season's final game.

NSL Cup finals
Final No.	Season	Winners	Score	Runners–up	Venue	Attendance
1st	1977	Brisbane City (1)	1–1 † (Note: Score was 1–1 after extra time. Brisbane City won the penalty shoot-out 5–3.)	Marconi	Perry Park	7,000
2nd	1978	Brisbane City (1)	2–1	Adelaide City	Perry Park	4,900
3rd	1979	Adelaide City (1)	3–2	St George-Budapest	Olympic Sports Field	8,564
4th	1980	Marconi Fairfield (1)	0–0 *	Heidelberg United	Olympic Park	6,388
4th (R)	1980	Marconi Fairfield (1)	3–0	Heidelberg United	Marconi Oval	5,179
5th	1981	Brisbane Lions (1)	3–1	West Adelaide Hellas	Bruce Stadium	6,132
6th	1982	APIA Leichhardt (1)	2–1	Heidelberg United	Olympic Park	5,000
7th (1st)	1983	Sydney Olympic (1)	1–0	Heidelberg United	St George Stadium	6,420
7th (2nd)	1983	Sydney Olympic (1)	1–0	Heidelberg United	Olympic Park	6,000
8th	1984	Newcastle Rosebud United (1)	1–0	Melbourne Croatia	Olympic Park	4,000
9th	1985	Sydney Olympic (2)	2–1	Preston Lions	St George Stadium	11,187
10th	1986	Sydney City (1)	3–2	West Adelaide Hellas	Hindmarsh Stadium	3,200
11th (1st)	1987	Sydney Croatia (1)	1–0	South Melbourne	St George Stadium	5,845
11th (2nd)	1987	Sydney Croatia (1)	1–0	South Melbourne	Olympic Park	6,000
12th	1988	APIA Leichhardt (2)	0–0 † (Note: Score was 0–0 after extra time. APIA Leichhardt won the penalty shoot-out 5–3.)	Brunswick Juventus	Marconi Stadium	2,200
13th	1989	Adelaide City (2)	2–0	Sydney Olympic	Hindmarsh Stadium	10,000
14th	1989–90	South Melbourne (1)	4–1	Sydney Olympic	Olympic Park	8,790
15th	1990–91	Melita Eagles (1)	1–0	Preston Lions	Marconi Stadium	6,749
16th	1991–92	Adelaide City (3)	2–1	Marconi Fairfield	Hindmarsh Stadium	3,102
17th	1992–93	Heidelberg United (1)	2–1	Parramatta Eagles	Marconi Stadium	2,596
18th	1993–94	Parramatta Eagles (2)	2–0	Sydney United	Marconi Stadium	4,156
19th	1994–95	Melbourne Knights § (1)	6–0	Heidelberg United	Olympic Park	4,500
20th	1995–96	South Melbourne (2)	3–1	Newcastle Breakers	Lakeside Stadium	5,000
21st	1996–97	Collingwood Warriors (1)	1–0	Marconi Fairfield	Lakeside Stadium	2,327

== Results by team ==
Results by team
Club	Wins	First final won	Last final won	Runners-up	Last final lost	Total final appearances
Adelaide City	3	1979	1992	1	1978	4
Parramatta Eagles	2	1991	1994	1	1993	3
Brisbane City	2	1977	1978	0	—	2
Sydney Olympic	2	1983	1985	0	—	2
APIA Leichhardt	2	1982	1988	0	—	2
South Melbourne	2	1990	1996	0	—	2
Heidelberg United	1	1993	1993	4	1995	5
Marconi-Fairfield	1	1980	1980	3	1997	4
Sydney United	1	1987	1987	1	1994	2
Melbourne Knights	1	1995	1995	1	1984	2
Brisbane Lions	1	1981	1981	0	—	1
Newcastle Rosebud United	1	1984	1984	0	—	1
Sydney City	1	1986	1986	0	—	1
Collingwood Warriors	1	1997	1997	0	—	1
West Adelaide	0	—	—	2	1986	2
Preston Lions	0	—	—	2	1991	2
St George	0	—	—	1	1979	1
Newcastle Breakers	0	—	—	1	1996	1

== See also ==
- List of association football competitions
