= List of Australian men's soccer champions =

The Australian men's soccer champions are the winners of the highest league in Australian men's soccer. The men's national championship was contested in the National Soccer League from 1977 to 2003–04, in the A-League from 2005–06 to 2020–21, and in the A-League Men since 2021–22.

Eastern Suburbs, now Hakoah Sydney City East, were the first men's national champions after winning the inaugural 1977 National Soccer League season.

As is the case in most Australian sports, the winners of a post-season playoffs competition, known as the Finals, has traditionally been crowned champion, unlike the first-past-the-post system used in many other countries. The team that finished first-past-the-post was often referred to as the Minor Premiers while the Finals winning team was awarded the Premiership. In an attempt to create more prestige around the first-past-the-post title, it was renamed the Premiership and the finals winning team is now awarded the Championship. The 2025–26 season is the 49th season of national level men's soccer in Australia.

== Background ==
In 1977, the Australian Soccer Association established the National Soccer League (NSL) of Australia, which included teams from Adelaide, Brisbane, Canberra, Melbourne and Sydney. The competition ran a promotion-relegation system for its entire lifespan as well as a knockout cup competition.

For the first seven seasons, the NSL awarded the championship to the team that finished first-past-the-post and was dominated by Sydney-based teams. By the mid-80s, the league had introduced a post-season playoffs competition that would crown the champions and the title was shared more evenly around the nation. Seasons initially ran over the winter months until 1989 when it was changed to the summer months to avoid conflicts with Australian rules football and the two rugby codes. By 2000, each major capital city had secured at least one NSL title outside of Perth. The Perth Glory made history in 2002–03 when they were crowned champions and the victory meant the five major cities of Adelaide, Brisbane, Melbourne, Perth and Sydney had all secured at least one NSL title over the duration of the league's history.

The National Soccer League was disbanded in 2004 and an 8-team A-League competition was established in 2005, which included a salary cap and no promotion-relegation. Adelaide, Newcastle and Perth were the only NSL teams retained in the new competition. It included one team from each of the major capital cities, two regional teams and a team from New Zealand. As is the case in many sporting leagues in Australia, a New Zealand-based team has been allowed entry into the top tiered Australian league since 1999. The decision to retain a New Zealand-based team in the top league has proved problematic in recent years due to Football Federation Australia's decision to move from the Oceania Football Confederation to the Asian Football Confederation in 2006. As a result, a New Zealand-based team can be crowned Premiers and/or Champions of Australia but is ineligible to compete in the Asian Champions League.

== Lists of champions ==
Championship determination
Season(s)	Format
1977 to 1983	First placed team
1984 to 1986	Grand Final winning team
1987	First placed team
1988 onwards	Grand Final winning team

=== National Soccer League (1977–2004) ===
Season	Champions (number of titles)	Score	Runners-up	Winning head coach	Season top goalscorer
1977	Eastern Suburbs (Note: Hakoah Sydney City East were known as Eastern Suburbs until 1979.)	—	Marconi Fairfield	(Israel) Gerry Chaldi	(Scotland) John Deans (16) (Adelaide City)
1978	West Adelaide	—	Eastern Suburbs	(England) Billy Birch	(Australia) Ken Boden (14) (Newcastle KB United) (Australia) Clive Eaton (14) (Western Suburbs)
1979	Marconi Fairfield (Note: Marconi Stallions were known as Marconi Fairfield until 2004.)	—	Heidelberg United	(Australia) Les Scheinflug	(Australia) Mark Jankovics (18) (Marconi Fairfield)
1980	Sydney City (Note: Eastern Suburbs became known as Sydney City in 1979; the club is now known as Hakoah Sydney City East.) (2)	—	Heidelberg United	(Scotland) Eddie Thomson	(Australia) Gary Cole (21) (Heidelberg United)
1981	Sydney City (3)	—	South Melbourne	(Scotland) Eddie Thomson	(Australia) Gary Cole (16) (Heidelberg United)
1982	Sydney City (4)	—	St George-Budapest	(Scotland) Eddie Thomson	(Australia) John Kosmina (23) (Sydney City)
1983	St George-Budapest	—	Sydney City	(Socialist Federal Republic of Yugoslavia) Frank Arok	(Australia) Duggie Brown (16) (South Melbourne)
1984	South Melbourne (Note: Also won Premiers.)	2–1; 2–1	Sydney Olympic	(Australia) Len McKendry	(Australia) Duggie Brown (22) (South Melbourne)
1985	Brunswick Juventus (Note: Brunswick Zebras were known as Brunswick Juventus until 1993.)	1–0; 1–0	Sydney City	(Australia) John Margaritis	(Australia) Duggie Brown (22) (South Melbourne)
1986	Adelaide City	0–1; 3–1	Sydney Olympic	(Socialist Federal Republic of Yugoslavia) Zoran Matić	(Australia) Graham Arnold (17) (Sydney Croatia)
1987	APIA Leichhardt	—	Preston Makedonia	(Socialist Federal Republic of Yugoslavia) Rale Rasic	(Australia) Frank Farina (16) (Marconi Fairfield)
1988	Marconi Fairfield (2)	2–2 (5–4 p)	Sydney Croatia	(Australia) Berti Mariani	(Australia) Frank Farina (17) (Marconi Fairfield)
1989	Marconi Fairfield (3)	1–0	Sydney Olympic	(Australia) Berti Mariani	(Socialist Federal Republic of Yugoslavia) Zlatko Nastevski (22) (Marconi Fairfield)
1989–90	Sydney Olympic	2–0	Marconi Fairfield	(Australia) Mick Hickman	(Australia) David Seal (15) (Sydney Croatia)
1990–91	South Melbourne (2)	1–1 (5–4 p)	Melbourne Croatia	(Hungary) Ferenc Puskás	(Australia) David Seal (19) (Marconi Fairfield)
1991–92	Adelaide City (Note: Also won the NSL Cup.) (2)	0–0 (4–2 p)	Melbourne Croatia	(Socialist Federal Republic of Yugoslavia) Zoran Matić	
1992–93	Marconi Fairfield (4)	1–0	Adelaide City	(Socialist Federal Republic of Yugoslavia) Frank Arok	(Australia) Francis Awaritefe (18) (South Melbourne)
1993–94	Adelaide City (3)	1–0	Melbourne Knights	(Socialist Federal Republic of Yugoslavia) Zoran Matić	
1994–95	Melbourne Knights	2–0	Adelaide City	(Croatia) Mirko Bazić	(Australia) Mark Viduka (18) (Melbourne Knights)
1995–96	Melbourne Knights (2)	2–1	Marconi Fairfield	(Croatia) Mirko Bazić	(Australia) Damian Mori (31) (Adelaide City)
1996–97	Brisbane Strikers	2–0	Sydney United	(Australia) Frank Farina	(Australia) David Zdrilic (21) (Sydney United)
1997–98	South Melbourne (3)	2–1	Carlton	(Australia) Ange Postecoglou	(Australia) Damian Mori (19) (Adelaide City)
1998–99	South Melbourne (4)	3–2	Sydney United	(Australia) Ange Postecoglou	(Australia) Pablo Cardozo (18) (Sydney Olympic)
1999–2000	Wollongong Wolves	3–3 (7–6 p)	Perth Glory	(Australia) Nick Theodorakopoulos	(Australia) Damian Mori (22) (Adelaide City Force)
2000–01	Wollongong Wolves (2)	2–1	South Melbourne	(Australia) Ron Corry	(Australia) Sasho Petrovski (18) (Wollongong Wolves) (Australia) Damian Mori (18) (Perth Glory)
2001–02	Sydney Olympic (2)	1–0	Perth Glory	(Australia) Gary Phillips	
2002–03	Perth Glory	2–0	Olympic Sharks	(England) Mich d'Avray	(Australia) Damian Mori (24) (Perth Glory)
2003–04	Perth Glory (2)	1–0 (a.e.t.)	Parramatta Power	(England) Mich d'Avray	(Australia) Ante Milicic (20) (Parramatta Power)

=== A-League / A-League Men (2005–present) ===
Season	Champions (number of titles)	Score	Runners-up	Winning head coach	Season top goalscorer
2005–06	Sydney FC	1–0	Central Coast Mariners	(Germany) Pierre Littbarski	(Australia) Alex Brosque (8) (Brisbane Roar) (Australia) Bobby Despotovski (8) (Perth Glory) (Australia) Archie Thompson (8) (Melbourne Victory) (Scotland) Stewart Petrie (8) (Central Coast Mariners)
2006–07	Melbourne Victory	6–0	Adelaide United	(Scotland) Ernie Merrick	(Australia) Archie Thompson (15) (Melbourne Victory)
2007–08	Newcastle Jets	1–0	Central Coast Mariners	(Australia) Gary van Egmond	(Australia) Joel Griffiths (12) (Newcastle Jets)
2008–09	Melbourne Victory (Note: Also won the A-League Pre-Season Challenge Cup) (2)	1–0	Adelaide United	(Scotland) Ernie Merrick	(New Zealand) Shane Smeltz (12) (Wellington Phoenix)
2009–10	Sydney FC (2)	1–1 (a.e.t.) (4–2 p)	Melbourne Victory	(Czech Republic) Vítězslav Lavička	(New Zealand) Shane Smeltz (19) (Gold Coast United)
2010–11	Brisbane Roar	2–2 (a.e.t.) (4–2 p)	Central Coast Mariners	(Australia) Ange Postecoglou	(Indonesia) Sergio van Dijk (16) (Adelaide United)
2011–12	Brisbane Roar (2)	2–1	Perth Glory	(Australia) Ange Postecoglou	(Albania) Besart Berisha (19) (Brisbane Roar)
2012–13	Central Coast Mariners	2–0	Western Sydney Wanderers	(Australia) Graham Arnold	(Australia) Daniel McBreen (17) (Central Coast Mariners)
2013–14	Brisbane Roar (3)	2–1 (a.e.t.)	Western Sydney Wanderers	(England) Mike Mulvey	(Australia) Adam Taggart (16) (Newcastle Jets)
2014–15	Melbourne Victory (3)	3–0	Sydney FC	(Australia) Kevin Muscat	(Austria) Marc Janko (16) (Sydney FC)
2015–16	Adelaide United	3–1	Western Sydney Wanderers	(Spain) Guillermo Amor	(Uruguay) Bruno Fornaroli (23) (Melbourne City)
2016–17	Sydney FC (3)	1–1 (a.e.t.) (4–2 p)	Melbourne Victory	(Australia) Graham Arnold	(Kosovo) Besart Berisha (19) (Melbourne Victory) (Australia) Jamie Maclaren (19) (Brisbane Roar)
2017–18	Melbourne Victory (4)	1–0	Newcastle Jets	(Australia) Kevin Muscat	(Brazil) Bobô (27) (Sydney FC)
2018–19	Sydney FC (4)	0–0 (a.e.t.) (4–1 p)	Perth Glory	(Australia) Steve Corica	(Fiji) Roy Krishna (18) (Wellington Phoenix)
2019–20	Sydney FC (5)	1–0 (a.e.t.)	Melbourne City	(Australia) Steve Corica	(Australia) Jamie Maclaren (23) (Melbourne City)
2020–21	Melbourne City	3–1	Sydney FC	(Australia) Patrick Kisnorbo	(Australia) Jamie Maclaren (25) (Melbourne City)
2021–22	Western United	2–0	Melbourne City	(Australia) John Aloisi	(Australia) Jamie Maclaren (15) (Melbourne City)
2022–23	Central Coast Mariners (2)	6–1	Melbourne City	(Scotland) Nick Montgomery	(Australia) Jamie Maclaren (24) (Melbourne City)
2023–24	Central Coast Mariners (3)	3–1 (a.e.t.)	Melbourne Victory	(England) Mark Jackson	(Australia) Adam Taggart (20) (Perth Glory)
2024–25	Melbourne City (2)	1–0	Melbourne Victory	(Australia) Aurelio Vidmar	(Australia) Archie Goodwin (13) (Adelaide United) (Australia) Adrian Segecic (13) (Sydney FC)
2025–26	(New Zealand) Auckland FC	1–0	Sydney FC	(Australia) Steve Corica	(England) Sam Cosgrove (11) (Auckland FC) (Australia) Luka Jovanovic (11) (Adelaide United)

== Total championships won ==
There are 22 clubs who have won an Australian championship (either by winning the grand final or finishing top of the league in the seasons without a grand final), including nine that have won the A-League/A-League Men (2005–present). The most recent clubs to win their inaugural championship were Auckland FC (2025–26 champions), Western United (2021–22), Melbourne City (2020–21) and Adelaide United (2015–16).

Six teams have finished as runners-up without ever winning the championship: Heidelberg United (1979, 1980), Preston Lions (1987), Sydney United 58 (1988, 1996–97, 1998–99), Carlton (1997–98), Parramatta Power (2003–04) and Western Sydney Wanderers (2012–13, 2013–14, 2015–16).

Teams in bold compete in the A-League Men as of the 2025–26 season.

Club	Winners	Runners-up	Winning seasons
**Sydney FC**	5	3	2005–06, 2009–10, 2016–17, 2018–19, 2019–20
**Melbourne Victory**	4	4	2006–07, 2008–09, 2014–15, 2017–18
Hakoah Sydney City East	4	3	1977, 1980, 1981, 1982
Marconi Stallions	4	3	1979, 1988, 1989, 1992–93
South Melbourne	4	2	1984, 1990–91, 1997–98, 1998–99
**Central Coast Mariners**	3	3	2012–13, 2022–23, 2023–24
Adelaide City	3	2	1986, 1991–92, 1993–94
**Brisbane Roar**	3	0	2010–11, 2011–12, 2013–14
Sydney Olympic	2	4	1989–90, 2001–02
**Perth Glory**	2	4	2002–03, 2003–04
Melbourne Knights	2	3	1994–95, 1995–96
**Melbourne City**	2	3	2020–21, 2024–25
Wollongong Wolves	2	0	1999–2000, 2000–01
**Adelaide United**	1	2	2015–16
St George	1	1	1983
**Newcastle Jets**	1	1	2007–08
West Adelaide	1	0	1978
Brunswick Juventus	1	0	1985
APIA Leichhardt	1	0	1987
Brisbane Strikers	1	0	1996–97
Western United	1	0	2021–22
(New Zealand) **Auckland FC**	1	0	2025–26

=== By city ===
City	Championships	Clubs
Sydney	17	Sydney FC (5), Hakoah Sydney City East (4), Marconi Stallions (4), Sydney Olympic (2), St George (1), APIA Leichhardt (1)
Melbourne	14	South Melbourne (4), Melbourne Victory (4), Melbourne Knights (2), Melbourne City (2), Brunswick Juventus (1), Western United (1)
Adelaide	5	Adelaide City (3), West Adelaide (1), Adelaide United (1)
Brisbane	4	Brisbane Roar (3), Brisbane Strikers (1)
Gosford	3	Central Coast Mariners (3)
Perth	2	Perth Glory (2)
Wollongong	2	Wollongong Wolves (2)
Newcastle	1	Newcastle Jets (1)
(New Zealand) Auckland	1	Auckland FC (1)

=== Australian soccer champions map ===
Location of Australian soccer champions
Location of Australian soccer champions from New Zealand

== Lists of premiers ==
=== National Soccer League (1977–2004) ===
Season	Premiers (number of titles)
1984	Sydney City
1985	Sydney City (2)
1986	Sydney United
1988	Wollongong Wolves
1989	Marconi Fairfield
1989–90	Marconi Fairfield (2)
1990–91	Melbourne Knights
1991–92	Melbourne Knights (2)
1992–93	South Melbourne
1993–94	Melbourne Knights (3)
1994–95	Melbourne Knights (4)
1995–96	Marconi Fairfield (3)
1996–97	Sydney United (2)
1997–98	South Melbourne (2)
1998–99	Sydney United (3)
1999–2000	Perth Glory
2000–01	South Melbourne (3)
2001–02	Perth Glory (2)
2002–03	Sydney Olympic
2003–04	Perth Glory (3)

=== A-League / A-League Men (2005–present) ===
Season	Premiers (number of titles)
2005–06	Adelaide United
2006–07	Melbourne Victory
2007–08	Central Coast Mariners
2008–09	Melbourne Victory (2)
2009–10	Sydney FC
2010–11	Brisbane Roar
2011–12	Central Coast Mariners (2)
2012–13	Western Sydney Wanderers
2013–14	Brisbane Roar (2)
2014–15	Melbourne Victory (3)
2015–16	Adelaide United (2)
2016–17	Sydney FC (2)
2017–18	Sydney FC (3)
2018–19	Perth Glory (4)
2019–20	Sydney FC (4)
2020–21	Melbourne City
2021–22	Melbourne City (2)
2022–23	Melbourne City (3)
2023–24	Central Coast Mariners (3)
2024–25	(New Zealand) Auckland FC
2025–26	Newcastle Jets

== Total Premierships won ==
Teams in bold compete in the A-League Men as of the 2025–26 season.

Club	Winners	Runners-up	Winning seasons
**Sydney FC**	4	4	2009–10, 2016–17, 2017–18, 2019–20
Melbourne Knights	4	1	1990–91, 1991–92, 1993–94, 1994–95
**Perth Glory**	4	1	1999–2000, 2001–02, 2003–04, 2018–19
South Melbourne	3	5	1992–93, 1997–98, 2000–01
**Central Coast Mariners**	3	3	2007–08, 2011–12, 2023–24
**Melbourne Victory**	3	3	2006–07, 2008–09, 2014–15
Sydney United	3	2	1986, 1996–97, 1998–99
Marconi Stallions	3	1	1989, 1989–90, 1995–96
**Melbourne City**	3	1	2020–21, 2021–22, 2022–23
**Adelaide United**	2	2	2005–06, 2015–16
**Brisbane Roar**	2	1	2010–11, 2013–14
Sydney City	2	0	1984, 1985
Sydney Olympic	1	3	2002–03
**Newcastle Jets**	1	3	2025–26
**Western Sydney Wanderers**	1	2	2012–13
Wollongong Wolves	1	2	1988
(New Zealand) **Auckland FC**	1	0	2024–25

=== By City ===
City	Championships	Clubs
Sydney	14	Sydney FC (4), Sydney United (3), Marconi Stallions (3), Sydney City (2), Sydney Olympic (1), Western Sydney Wanderers (1)
Melbourne	13	Melbourne Knights (4), South Melbourne (3), Melbourne Victory (3), Melbourne City (3)
Perth	4	Perth Glory (4)
Gosford	3	Central Coast Mariners (3)
Adelaide	2	Adelaide United (2)
Brisbane	2	Brisbane Roar (2)
Wollongong	1	Wollongong Wolves (1)
(New Zealand) Auckland	1	Auckland FC (1)
Newcastle	1	Newcastle Jets (1)

== National Cup winners ==
Key
Cup winners also won the NSL/A-League Men Championship that season
Cup winners also won the NSL/A-League Men Premiership that season
Cup winners also won the NSL/A-League Men Championship and Premiership that season

=== Australia Cup ===
Season	Cup Winner (number of titles)	Score	Runners-up	Clubs participating	Top goalscorer	Goals
1962	Sydney Yugal (1)	8–1	St. George Budapest	16	(Socialist Federal Republic of Yugoslavia) Tiko Jelisavcic (Sydney Yugal)	6
1963	Slavia Melbourne (1)	0–0; 3–2	Polonia Melbourne	24	(Wales) Des Palmer (Slavia Melbourne)	6
1964	George Cross (1)	3–2 (a.e.t.)	APIA Leichhardt	19	(Australia) John Giacometti (APIA Leichhardt)	7
1965	Sydney Hakoah (1)	1–1 (13–13 p); 2–1 (replay)	APIA Leichhardt	13	(Argentina) Hugo Rodriguez (St George Budapest)	6
1966	APIA Leichhardt (1)	2–0	Sydney Hakoah	16	(Australia) John Giacometti (APIA Leichhardt) (Australia) Herbert Ninaus (Sydney Hakoah)	4
1967	Melbourne Hungaria (1)	4–3	APIA Leichhardt	16	(Australia) Attila Abonyi (Melbourne Hungaria) (Australia) Johnny Watkiss (APIA Leichhardt)	6
1968	Sydney Hakoah (2)	3–0; 3–1	Melbourne Hakoah	18	(Australia) Jimmy Armstrong (Melbourne Hakoah) (Australia) Willie Rutherford (Sydney Hakoah)	4

=== NSL Cup ===
Season	Cup Winner (number of titles)	Score	Runners-up	Clubs participating	Highest placed non-NSL club	Top goalscorer	Goals
1977	Brisbane City (1)	1–1 (5–3 p)	Marconi Fairfield	14	— (Note: This season's competition was exclusive to NSL clubs.)	(Australia) Branko Buljevic (Fitzroy United) (Australia) Gary Cole (Fitzroy United) (Australia) Peter Sharne (Marconi Fairfield)	3
1978	Brisbane City (2)	2–1	Adelaide City	32	Essendon Croatia (2) (Quarter-finals)	(Australia) Branko Culina (Essendon Croatia) (Australia) Barry Kelso (Brisbane City)	4
1979	Adelaide City (1)	3–1	St. George-Budapest	32	Eastern Districts Azzurri (2) (Quarter-finals)	(Australia) John Nyskohus (Adelaide City)	7
1980	Marconi Fairfield (1)	0–0 (a.e.t.); 3–0 (Replay)	Heidelberg United	32	Spearwood Dalmatinac (2) (Quarter-finals)	(Australia) Eddie Krncevic (Marconi Fairfield)	6
1981	Brisbane Lions (1) (Note: In 2016 the FFA confirmed Brisbane Roar assumed all of the Brisbane Lions FC's NSL history and were therefore credited the 1981 NSL Cup honour.)	3–1	West Adelaide	36	St Kilda Hakoah (2) (Quarter-finals)	(Australia) Ken Boden (Sydney City)	5
1982	APIA Leichhardt (2)	2–1	Heidelberg United	16	—	(Australia) John Bradley (APIA Leichhardt) (Scotland) Ian Gibson (Canberra City) (Australia) Peter Jones (APIA Leichhardt) (Australia) John Kosmina (Sydney City) (Australia) Grant Lee (Sydney City) (Australia) Jimmy McBreen (APIA Leichhardt) (Australia) Ian Stone (Canberra City) (Australia) Mike Valentine (Heidelberg United)	2
1983	Sydney Olympic (1)	1–0; 1–0	Heidelberg United	16	—	(Australia) Jim Patikas (Sydney Olympic)	5
1984	Newcastle Rosebud (1)	1–0	Melbourne Croatia	24	—	(Australia) David Brogan (Melbourne Croatia)	5
1985	Sydney Olympic (2)	2–1	Preston Makedonia	32	Adelaide Croatia (2) (Quarter-finals)	(Australia) Steve Smith (Preston Makedonia)	4
1986	Sydney City (3)	3–2 (a.e.t.)	West Adelaide	32	Croydon City (2) (Quarter-finals)	(Australia) Frank Farina (Sydney City)	5
1987	Sydney Croatia (1)	1–0; 1–0	South Melbourne	13	—	(Australia) Charlie Egan (South Melbourne) (Australia) Robbie Slater (Sydney Croatia)	3
1988	APIA Leichhardt (3)	0–0 (5–3 p)	Brunswick Juventus	14	—	(New Zealand) Grant Lightbown (Brisbane Lions)	3
1989	Adelaide City (2)	2–0	Sydney Olympic	14	—	(Australia) Kimon Taliadoros (South Melbourne)	4
1989–90	South Melbourne (1)	4–1	Sydney Olympic	14	—	(Australia) Paul Trimboli (South Melbourne) (Australia) Abbas Saad (Sydney Olympic)	3
1990–91	Parramatta Eagles (1)	1–0	Preston Lions	14	—	(New Zealand) Greg Brown (Parramatta Eagles)	3
1991–92	Adelaide City (3)	2–1	Marconi Fairfield	14	—	(Australia) David Seal (Marconi Fairfield)	3
1992–93	Heidelberg United (1)	2–0	Parramatta Eagles	14	—	(Australia) Carl Veart (Adelaide City)	5
1993–94	Parramatta Eagles (2)	2–0	Sydney United	14	Brisbane United (2) (Semi-finals)	(Australia) Francis Awaritefe (South Melbourne)	4
1994–95	Melbourne Knights (1)	6–0	Heidelberg United	14	Melbourne Zebras (2) (Quarter-finals)	(Australia) Mark Viduka (Melbourne Knights)	6
1995–96	South Melbourne (2)	3–1	Newcastle Breakers	12	—	(New Zealand) Vaughan Coveny (South Melbourne)	6
1996–97	Collingwood Warriors (1)	1–0	Marconi Fairfield	16	Brisbane Lions (2) (Round of 16)	(Australia) Francis Awaritefe (Marconi Fairfield)	4

=== FFA Cup / Australia Cup ===
Season	Cup winners (number of titles)	Score	Runners-up	Clubs participating	Highest placed non-A-League club	Top goalscorer	Goals
2014	Adelaide United (1)	1–0	Perth Glory	631	Bentleigh Greens (2) (Semi-finals)	(Spain) Sergio Cirio (Adelaide United)	6
2015	Melbourne Victory (1)	2–0	Perth Glory	648	Hume City (2) (Semi-finals)	(Australia) Aaron Mooy (Melbourne City)	6
2016	Melbourne City (1)	1–0	Sydney FC	704	Canberra Olympic (2) (Semi-finals)	(Australia) Patrick Antelmi (Blacktown City)	5
2017	Sydney FC (1)	2–1 (a.e.t.)	Adelaide United	735	South Melbourne (2) (Semi-finals)	(Brazil) Bobô (Sydney FC)	8
2018	Adelaide United (2)	2–1	Sydney FC	781	Bentleigh Greens (2) (Semi-finals)	(Australia) Craig Goodwin (Adelaide United)	5
2019	Adelaide United (3)	4–0	Melbourne City	736	Brisbane Strikers (2) (Semi-finals)	(Australia) Jamie Maclaren (Melbourne City)	6
2020	Tournament cancelled due to the COVID-19 pandemic in Australia			765			
2021	Melbourne Victory (2)	2–1	Central Coast Mariners	765	APIA Leichhardt (2) (Quarter-finals)	(Australia) Cyrus Dehmie (Brisbane Roar)	3
2022	Macarthur FC (1)	2–0	Sydney United 58	750	Sydney United 58 (2) (Final)	(Australia) Al Hassan Toure (Macarthur FC)	5
2023	Sydney FC (2)	3–1	Brisbane Roar	778	Melbourne Knights (2) (Semi-finals)	(Australia) Lachlan Brook (Western Sydney Wanderers)	5
2024	Macarthur FC (2)	1–0	Melbourne Victory	759	South Melbourne (2) (Semi-finals)	(Australia) Nishan Velupillay (Melbourne Victory)	5
2025	Newcastle Jets (1)	3–1 (a.e.t.)	Heidelberg United	718	Heidelberg United (2) (Final)	(South Sudan) Manyluak Aguek (Avondale FC)	6
2026	South Melbourne (3)	1–1 (4–3) (p)	Melbourne Victory	777	N/A	(Australia) Bul Juach (South Melbourne)	5

== Total Cups won ==
Club	Winners	Runners-up	Winning seasons
APIA Leichhardt	3	3	1966, 1982, 1988
Adelaide United	3	1	2014, 2018, 2019
Adelaide City	3	1	1979, 1989, 1991–92
Sydney City	3	1	1965, 1968, 1986
South Melbourne	3	1	1989–90, 1995–96, 2026
Sydney FC	2	2	2017, 2023
Sydney Olympic	2	2	1983, 1985
Melbourne Victory	2	1	2015, 2021
Parramatta Eagles	2	1	1990–91, 1993–94
Brisbane City	2	0	1977, 1978
Macarthur FC	2	0	2022, 2024
Heidelberg United	1	4	1992–93
Marconi Stallions	1	3	1980
Melbourne Knights	1	1	1994–95
Sydney United	1	1	1987
Brisbane Roar	1	1	1981^{5}
Melbourne City	1	1	2016
Collingwood Warriors	1	0	1996–97
George Cross	1	0	1964
Melbourne Hungaria	1	0	1967
Newcastle Rosebud	1	0	1984
Newcastle Jets	1	0	2025
Slavia Melbourne	1	0	1963
Sydney Yugal	1	0	1962

== Continental Champions ==
=== Oceania Club Championship ===
Season	Champions	Score	Runners-up	Number of clubs participating
1987	Adelaide City	1–1 (4–1 p)	(New Zealand) University-Mount Wellington	9
1999	South Melbourne	5–1	(Fiji) Nadi	9
2001	Wollongong Wolves	1–0	(Vanuatu) Tafea	11
2005	Sydney FC	2–0	(New Caledonia) Magenta	13

=== Oceania Cup Winners' Cup ===
Season	Champions	Score	Runners-up	Number of clubs participating
1987	Sydney City	2–0	(New Zealand) North Shore United	2

=== AFC Champions League ===
Season	Champions	Score	Runners-up	Number of clubs participating
2014	Western Sydney Wanderers	1–0; 0–0	(Saudi Arabia) Al-Hilal	47

=== AFC Cup ===
Season	Champions	Score	Runners-up	Number of clubs participating
2023–24	Central Coast Mariners	1–0	(Lebanon) Al Ahed	49

== Multiple trophy wins ==
=== The Double ===
Continental Double OFC (1966–2004) / AFC (2005–present)
Club	Season	Titles
South Melbourne	1998–99	NSL Premiership, Oceania Club Championship
Wollongong Wolves	2000–01	NSL Premiership, Oceania Club Championship

Domestic Double
Club	Season	Titles
South Melbourne	1984	NSL Minor Premiership, NSL Premiership
Marconi Stallions	1989	NSL Minor Premiership, NSL Premiership
Adelaide City	1991–92	NSL Premiership, NSL Cup
Melbourne Knights	1994–95	NSL Minor Premiership, NSL Premiership
South Melbourne	1997–98	NSL Minor Premiership, NSL Premiership
Perth Glory	2003–04	NSL Minor Premiership, NSL Premiership
Melbourne Victory	2006–07	A-League Premiership, A-League Championship
Melbourne Victory	2008–09	A-League Premiership, A-League Championship
Sydney FC	2009–10	A-League Premiership, A-League Championship
Brisbane Roar	2010–11	A-League Premiership, A-League Championship
Brisbane Roar	2013–14	A-League Premiership, A-League Championship
Melbourne Victory	2014–15	A-League Premiership, A-League Championship
Adelaide United	2015–16	A-League Premiership, A-League Championship
Sydney FC	2016–17	A-League Premiership, A-League Championship
Sydney FC	2017–18	A-League Premiership, FFA Cup
Sydney FC	2019–20	A-League Premiership, A-League Championship
Melbourne City FC	2020–21	A-League Premiership, A-League Championship
Central Coast Mariners FC	2023–24	A-League Premiership, A-League Championship
Newcastle Jets FC	2025–26	A-League Premiership, Australia Cup

=== Total Doubles ===
==== Continental Double ====
Continental Double OFC (1966–2004) / AFC (2005–present)
count	Team	Seasons
1	South Melbourne	1998–99
1	Wollongong Wolves	2000–01

==== Domestic Double ====
Domestic Double
count	Team	Seasons
4	Sydney FC	2009–10, 2016–17, 2017–18, 2019–20
3	Melbourne Victory	2006–07, 2008–09, 2014–15
2	Brisbane Roar	2010–11, 2013–14
2	South Melbourne	1984, 1997–98
1	Newcastle Jets	2025–26
1	Central Coast Mariners	2023–24
1	Melbourne City	2020–21
1	Adelaide United	2015–16
1	Perth Glory	2003–04
1	Melbourne Knights	1994–95
1	Adelaide City	1991–92
1	Marconi Stallions	1989

=== The Treble ===
Continental Treble OFC (1966–2004) / AFC (2005–present)
Club	Season	Titles
Central Coast Mariners	2023–24	A-League Men Premiership, A-League Men Championship, AFC Cup

Domestic Treble (Season)
Club	Season	Titles
Melbourne Knights	1994–95	NSL Minor Premiership, NSL Premiership, NSL Cup

Note: In the 2008–09 season Melbourne Victory won all three pieces of A-League silverware on offer, the Pre-Season Challenge Cup, the Premiership, and the Championship.

Domestic Treble (Calendar Year)
Club	Year	Titles
Melbourne Victory	2015	A-League Premiership, A-League Championship, FFA Cup
Sydney FC	2017	A-League Premiership, A-League Championship, FFA Cup

== Pre-Season Cup winners ==
=== Australian Club World Championship Qualifying Tournament ===
Season	Champions	Score	Runners-up	Clubs participating	Top goalscorer	Goals
2005	Sydney FC	1–0	Central Coast Mariners	7	(Australia) Nik Mrdja (Central Coast Mariners)	3

=== A-League Pre-Season Challenge Cup ===
Season	Champions	Score	Runners-up	Clubs participating	Top goalscorer	Goals
2005	Central Coast Mariners	1–0	Perth Glory	8	(Australia) Bobby Despotovski (Perth Glory) (Australia) Nik Mrdja (Central Coast Mariners) (Australia) Sasho Petrovski (Sydney FC)	3
2006	Adelaide United	1–1 (5–4 p)	Central Coast Mariners	8	(Australia) Danny Allsopp (Melbourne Victory) (Australia) Alex Brosque (Sydney FC) (Australia) Sasho Petrovski (Sydney FC) (Australia) Carl Veart (Adelaide United)	3
2007	Adelaide United	2–1	Perth Glory	8	(Brazil) Cássio (Adelaide United) (Australia) Bruce Djite (Adelaide United) (Australia) Joel Griffiths (Newcastle Jets) (Scotland) Simon Lynch (Queensland Roar) (New Zealand) Shane Smeltz (Wellington Phoenix)	3
2008	Melbourne Victory	0–0 (8–7 p)	(New Zealand) Wellington Phoenix	8	(Brazil) Cássio (Adelaide United) (Indonesia) Sergio van Dijk (Queensland Roar)	2

Note: All seasons were exclusive to A-League clubs only.

== Multiple title winners ==
Clubs in bold play in the A-League.

Team	Champions	League Premiers	Cup Winners	Continental Winners	Pre-Season Cup	Charity Shield	Total
**Sydney FC**	5	4	2	1	1	—	**13**
Sydney City	4	2	3	1	—	1	**11**
South Melbourne	4	3	3	1	—	—	**11**
**Melbourne Victory**	4	3	2	—	1	—	10
Marconi Stallions	4	3	1	—	—	1	**9**
**Central Coast Mariners**	3	3	—	1	1	—	**8**
**Adelaide United**	1	2	3	—	2	—	**8**
Adelaide City	3	—	3	1	—	—	**7**
Melbourne Knights	2	4	1	—	—	—	**7**
**Perth Glory**	2	4	—	—	—	—	**6**
**Melbourne City**	2	3	1	—	—	—	**6**
**Brisbane Roar**	3	2	—	—	—	—	**5**
Sydney Olympic	2	1	2	—	—	—	**5**
Wollongong Wolves	2	1	—	1	—	—	**4**
APIA Leichhardt	1	—	3	—	—	—	**4**
Sydney United	—	3	1	—	—	—	**4**
**Newcastle Jets**	1	1	1	—	—	—	**3**
(New Zealand) **Auckland FC**	1	1	—	—	—	—	**2**
**Western Sydney Wanderers**	—	1	—	1	—	—	**2**
Brisbane City	—	—	2	—	—	—	**2**
**Macarthur FC**	—	—	2	—	—	—	**2**
Parramatta	—	—	2	—	—	—	**2**

== See also ==
- List of association football competitions
- List of NSL Cup Finals
- List of A-League Men honours
