= 1980 Canberra City FC season =

Canberra City
1980 season
- Head Coach: Vic Fernandez; John Brown
- Stadium: Bruce Stadium
- National Soccer League: 10th
- NSL Cup: Quarter-finals
- Top goalscorer: League: Terry Byrne (8); All: Walter Valeri (11)
- Highest home attendance: 8,875 vs. Marconi Fairfield (6 April 1980); National Soccer League
- Lowest home attendance: 1,680 vs. Sydney City (7 September 1980); National Soccer League
- Average home league attendance: 4,096
- Biggest win: 7–2 vs. Canberra Deakin (H) (25 April 1980); NSL Cup
- Biggest defeat: 0–2 (3 times); 2–4 (once)

The 1980 season was the fourth in the history of Canberra City Football Club. In addition to the domestic league, they also participated in the NSL Cup. Canberra City finished 10th in their National Soccer League season, and were eliminated in the quarter-finals of the NSL Cup.

== Players ==
Note: Flags indicate national team as defined under FIFA eligibility rules; some limited exceptions apply. Players may hold more than one non-FIFA nationality.

No.	Pos.	Nation	Player
1	GK	AUS	Steve Hoszowski
2	DF	AUS	Danny Moulis
3	DF	AUS	Milan Milovanovic
4	DF	AUS	Robbie O'Shea
5	DF	AUS	Harry Williams
6	DF	AUS	Terry Byrne
7	FW	SCO	Don Maclaren
8	DF	AUS	John O'Shea
9	FW	AUS	Sebastian Giampaolo

No.	Pos.	Nation	Player
10	MF	AUS	Walter Valeri
11	FW	AUS	Tony Brennan
13	DF	AUS	Mike O'Shea
14	MF	SCO	Isaac Farrell
15	DF	ENG	Roy Stark
16	DF	SCO	John Brown
18	MF	NZL	Duncan Cole
20	GK	NZL	Richard Wilson

== Competitions ==
=== Overall record ===
Competition	First match	Last match	Starting round	Final position	Record							
Competition	First match	Last match	Starting round	Final position	Pld	W	D	L	GF	GA	GD	Win %
National Soccer League	9 March 1980	28 September 1980	Matchday 1	10th	26	7	7	12	34	33	+1	26.92
NSL Cup	25 April 1980	3 August 1980	First round	Quarter-finals	3	2	0	1	10	6	+4	66.67
Total					29	9	7	13	44	39	+5	31.03

Source: Competitions

=== National Soccer League ===
==== League table ====
Pos	Team	Pld	W	D	L	GF	GA	GD	Pts	Qualification or relegation
1	Sydney City (C)	26	16	5	5	51	26	+25	37	Qualification to Finals series (Note: The Finals series was not considered the championship for the 1980 National Soccer League.)
2	Heidelberg United	26	15	6	5	55	33	+22	36	Qualification to Finals series
3	South Melbourne	26	15	5	6	42	21	+21	35	Qualification to Finals series
4	Marconi Fairfield	26	14	6	6	53	32	+21	34	Qualification to Finals series
5	Adelaide City	26	13	4	9	40	27	+13	30	
6	Newcastle KB United	26	12	6	8	32	31	+1	30	
7	Brisbane Lions	26	7	11	8	28	32	−4	25	
8	APIA Leichhardt	26	8	7	11	27	35	−8	23	
9	Footscray JUST	26	7	9	10	32	41	−9	23	
10	Canberra City	26	7	7	12	34	33	+1	21	
11	Blacktown City	26	9	3	14	34	55	−21	21	
12	Brisbane City	26	4	10	12	29	36	−7	18	
13	West Adelaide	26	7	3	16	24	46	−22	17	
14	St George-Budapest (R)	26	5	4	17	32	65	−33	14	Relegated to the 1981 NSW State League

Updated to match(es) played on unknown. Source: rsssf.com
Rules for classification: 1) points; 2) goal difference; 3) number of goals scored.
(C) Champions; (R) Relegated

==== Results summary ====
Overall								Home						Away					
Pld	W	D	L	GF	GA	GD	Pts	W	D	L	GF	GA	GD	W	D	L	GF	GA	GD
26	7	7	12	34	33	+1	28	3	4	6	17	19	−2	4	3	6	17	14	+3

Source: worldfootball.net

==== Results by round ====
Round	1	3	4	5	6	7	8	9	10	11	12	13	14	15	16	2	17	18	19	20	21	22	23	24	25	26
Ground	H	H	A	H	A	H	A	H	A	H	A	H	H	A	H	A	A	A	H	A	H	A	H	A	H	A
Result	L	W	W	L	W	L	L	W	W	L	L	D	D	D	W	W	D	L	L	L	D	L	L	L	D	D
Position	13	3	3	4	4	6	6	6	6	6	6	7	7	8	7	8	7	7	8	9	8	8	8	11	11	10
Points	0	2	4	4	6	6	6	8	10	10	10	11	12	13	15	17	18	18	18	18	19	19	19	19	20	21

Source: worldfootball.net
A = Away; H = Home; W = Win; D = Draw; L = Loss

==== Matches ====
Win Draw Loss

9 March 1980 1	Canberra City	2–4	Brisbane Lions	Canberra
	O'Shea 41'; Giampaolo 54'	Report	Williams 24' (o.g.); McNaughton 37'; Hughes 82'; Niven 85' (pen.)	Stadium: Bruce Stadium; Attendance: 5,400; Referee: Len Allen

23 March 1980 3	Canberra City	1–0	Adelaide City	Canberra
	Giampaolo 85'	Report		Stadium: Bruce Stadium; Attendance: 4,080; Referee: Col Amos

30 March 1980 4	St George-Budapest	1–5	Canberra City	Sydney
15:00 AEDT	Duarte 65'	Report	Utjesenovic 15' (o.g.); Valeri 35', 86'; Cole 50'; Maclaren 89'	Stadium: St George Stadium; Attendance: 3,033; Referee: Richard Lorenc

6 April 1980 5	Canberra City	0–1	Marconi Fairfield	Canberra
		Report	Mariani 56'	Stadium: Bruce Stadium; Attendance: 8,875; Referee: Stewart Mellings

12 April 1980 6	Newcastle KB United	0–4	Canberra City	Newcastle
		Report	Giampaolo 27', 68'; Maclaren 41'; Valeri (82)	Stadium: Newcastle International Sports Centre; Attendance: 7,052; Referee: Tony Boskovic

20 April 1980 7	Canberra City	0–1	Heidelberg United	Canberra
15:00 AEST		Report	Campbell 28'	Stadium: Bruce Stadium; Attendance: 6,135; Referee: Peter Rampley

27 April 1980 8	South Melbourne	1–0	Canberra City	Melbourne
15:00 AEST	Christopoulos 3' (pen.)	Report		Stadium: Middle Park Soccer Stadium; Attendance: 3,600; Referee: Evan Venios

4 May 1980 9	Canberra City	4–3	West Adelaide	Canberra
15:00 AEST	Giampaolo 15'; O'Shea 43'; Valeri 52', 69' (pen.)	Report	Kosmina 14'; Topaz 36'; Key 56'	Stadium: Bruce Stadium; Attendance: 3,850; Referee: Bob Mee

11 May 1980 10	Sydney City	0–2	Canberra City	Sydney
15:00 AEST		Report	J. O'Shea 21'; Byrne 55'	Stadium: ES Marks Athletics Field; Attendance: 3,030; Referee: Tony Beazleigh

18 May 1980 11	Canberra City	0–1	Blacktown City	Canberra
15:00 AEST		Report	Wilkinson 84'	Stadium: Bruce Stadium; Attendance: 5,250; Referee: Dave Nugent

25 May 1980 12	APIA Leichhardt	2–1	Canberra City	Sydney
	Harding 6', 38' (pen.)	Report	Giampaolo 47'	Stadium: Lambert Park; Attendance: 2,789; Referee: Peter Rampley

1 June 1980 13	Canberra City	1–1	Brisbane City	Canberra
	J. O'Shea 72'	Report	Kelso 73'	Stadium: Bruce Stadium; Attendance: 3,580; Referee: Chris Bambridge

8 June 1980 14	Canberra City	0–0	Footscray JUST	Canberra
15:00 AEST		Report		Stadium: Bruce Stadium; Attendance: 3,300; Referee: Bob Mee

15 June 1980 15	Brisbane Lions	0–0	Canberra City	Brisbane
		Report		Stadium: Lions Stadium; Attendance: 2,500; Referee: Dave Nugent

22 June 1980 16	Canberra City	4–1	St George-Budapest	Canberra
	Brennan 36'; Byrne 72', 82'; Giampaolo 86'	Report	Utjesenovic 45' (pen.)	Stadium: Bruce Stadium; Attendance: 3,450; Referee: Col Amos

28 June 1980 2	Footscray JUST	0–1	Canberra City	Melbourne
		Report	Byrne 25'	Stadium: Middle Park Soccer Stadium; Attendance: 800; Referee: Tony Beazleigh

13 July 1980 17	Adelaide City	1–1	Canberra City	Adelaide
	Barnes 27'	Report	Valeri 66'	Stadium: Olympic Sports Field; Attendance: 4,100; Referee: Graham Neal

20 July 1980 18	Marconi Fairfield	3–2	Canberra City	Sydney
15:00 AEST	Jankovics 40'; Sharne 63'; Vieri 80'	Report	Stark 14'; Byrne 44'	Stadium: Marconi Oval; Attendance: 5,150; Referee: Doug Rennie

27 July 1980 19	Canberra City	1–2	Newcastle KB United	Canberra
	Byrne 67'	Report	Jones 26'; Senkalski 32'	Stadium: Bruce Stadium; Attendance: 4,095; Referee: Ken Allen

9 August 1980 20	Heidelberg United	2–0	Canberra City	Melbourne
	Campbell 24'; Paton 70'	Report		Stadium: Olympic Park; Attendance: 2,500; Referee: Tony Beazleigh

17 August 1980 21	Canberra City	0–0	South Melbourne	Canberra
15:00 AEST		Report		Stadium: Bruce Stadium; Attendance: 1,860; Referee: Bob Mee

31 August 1980 22	West Adelaide	2–0	Canberra City	Adelaide
	Tymczyszyn 53' (pen>); Manecas 89'	Report		Stadium: Hindmarsh Stadium; Attendance: 3,824; Referee: Don Campbell

7 September 1980 23	Canberra City	2–3	Sydney City	Canberra
	O'Shea 53'; Valeri 76'	Report	Spanos 63'; Boden 78'; Trenter 87'	Stadium: Bruce Stadium; Attendance: 1,680; Referee: Chris Bambridge

14 September 1980 24	Blacktown City	1–0	Canberra City	Sydney
	Hunter 88'	Report		Stadium: Gabbie Stadium; Attendance: 2,618; Referee: Richard Lorenc

21 September 1980 25	Canberra City	2–2	APIA Leichhardt	Canberra
15:00 AEST	Byrne 10', 66'	Report	Harding 53'; Coyne 62'	Stadium: Bruce Stadium; Attendance: 1,690; Referee: Bob Mee

28 September 1980 26	Brisbane City	1–1	Canberra City	Brisbane
	Gaffney 10'	Report	Maclaren 72'	Stadium: Perry Park; Attendance: 2,863; Referee: Tony Boskovic

=== NSL Cup ===
Win Draw Loss

25 April 1980 First round	Canberra City	7–2	(Australian Capital Territory) Canberra Deakin	Canberra
15:00 AEST	Giampaolo ?', ?'; Valeri ?', ?'; Byrne ?'; J. O'Shea ?'; Maclaren ?'	Report	Bull ?'; Dukic ?'	Stadium: Bruce Stadium; Attendance: 2,800; Referee: Ken Allen

16 July 1980 Second round	Canberra City	3–2 (a.e.t.)	(Victoria (state)) Preston Makedonia	Queanbeyan
20:00 AEST	Valeri 50', 109' (pen.); Cole 52'	Report	McMillman 74'; Lucchesi 79'	Stadium: Seiffert Oval; Attendance: 3,500; Referee: Tony Boskovic

3 August 1980 Quarter-finals	Canberra City	0–2	Heidelberg United	Canberra
14:30 AEST		Report	Selemidis 45'; Paton 89'	Stadium: Bruce Stadium; Attendance: 2,050; Referee: Richard Lorenc

== Statistics ==
=== Appearances and goals ===
Includes all competitions. Players with no appearances not included in the list.

No.	Pos.	Nat.	Player	National Soccer League		NSL Cup		Total	
No.	Pos.	Nat.	Player	Apps	Goals	Apps	Goals	Apps	Goals
1	GK	(Australia)	Steve Hoszowski	5	0	0	0	5	0
2	DF	(Australia)	Danny Moulis	24	0	3	0	27	0
3	DF	(Australia)	Milan Milovanovic	21	0	2	0	23	0
4	DF	(Australia)	Robbie O'Shea	23	1	3	0	26	1
5	DF	(Australia)	Harry Williams	16+1	0	1+1	0	19	0
6	DF	(Australia)	Terry Byrne	21+1	8	3	1	25	9
7	FW	(Scotland)	Don Maclaren	13+7	3	2	1	22	4
8	DF	(Australia)	John O'Shea	26	4	3	1	29	5
9	FW	(Australia)	Sebastian Giampaolo	17+4	7	3	2	24	9
10	MF	(Australia)	Walter Valeri	20+5	7	2	4	27	11
11	FW	(Australia)	Tony Brennan	18+5	1	1+1	0	25	1
13	DF	(Australia)	Mike O'Shea	6+2	0	2	0	10	0
14	MF	(Scotland)	Isaac Farrell	13+3	0	1+1	0	18	0
15	DF	(England)	Roy Stark	17	1	1	0	18	1
16	DF	(Scotland)	John Brown	1	0	0	0	1	0
18	MF	(New Zealand)	Duncan Cole	24	1	3	1	27	2
20	GK	(New Zealand)	Richard Wilson	21	0	3	0	24	0

=== Disciplinary record ===
Includes all competitions. The list is sorted by squad number when total cards are equal. Players with no cards not included in the list.

Rank	No.	Pos.	Nat.	Player	National Soccer League			NSL Cup			Total		
Rank	No.	Pos.	Nat.	Player	Yellow card	Second yellow card	Red card	Yellow card	Second yellow card	Red card	Yellow card	Second yellow card	Red card
1	3	DF	(Australia)	Milan Milovanovic	4	0	1	0	0	0	4	0	1
2	11	FW	(Australia)	Tony Brennan	1	0	1	0	0	0	1	0	1
3	2	DF	(Australia)	Danny Moulis	3	0	0	0	0	0	3	0	0
4	4	DF	(Australia)	Robbie O'Shea	2	0	0	0	0	0	2	0	0
5	5	DF	(Australia)	Harry Williams	1	0	0	0	0	0	1	0	0
5	8	DF	(Australia)	John O'Shea	1	0	0	0	0	0	1	0	0
5	9	FW	(Australia)	Sebastian Giampaolo	1	0	0	0	0	0	1	0	0
5	15	DF	(England)	Roy Stark	1	0	0	0	0	0	1	0	0
Total					14	0	2	0	0	0	14	0	2

=== Clean sheets ===
Includes all competitions. The list is sorted by squad number when total clean sheets are equal. Numbers in parentheses represent games where both goalkeepers participated and both kept a clean sheet; the number in parentheses is awarded to the goalkeeper who was substituted on, whilst a full clean sheet is awarded to the goalkeeper who was on the field at the start of play. Goalkeepers with no clean sheets not included in the list.

Rank	No.	Nat.	Goalkeeper	NSL	NSL Cup	Total
1	20	(Australia)	Richard Wilson	6	0	6
2	1	(Australia)	Steve Hoszowski	1	0	1
Total				7	0	7
