= 1985 NSL Cup =

National Soccer League Cup

Tournament details
- Country: Australia
- Dates: 2 March – 11 August 1985
- Teams: 32

Final positions
- Champions: Sydney Olympic (2nd title)
- Runners-up: Preston Makedonia

Tournament statistics
- Matches played: 31
- Goals scored: 94 (3.03 per match)
- Attendance: 75,865 (2,447 per match)

The 1985 NSL Cup was the ninth edition of the NSL Cup, which was the main national association football knockout cup competition in Australia. The competition was known as the Philips Cup under a sponsorship arrangement with Dutch company Philips.

Newcastle Rosebud United were the defending champions, having defeated Melbourne Croatia to win their first title in the previous year's final, but they were eliminated in the semi-finals by eventual winners Sydney Olympic.

Sydney Olympic defeated Preston Makedonia 2–1 in the final to win their second NSL Cup title.

== Teams ==
The NSL Cup was a knockout competition with 32 teams taking part all trying to reach the Final in August 1985. The competition consisted of the 24 teams from the National Soccer League (12 from the Northern Conference and 12 from the Southern Conference) plus 8 teams from their respective top division state leagues.

Round	Main date	Number of fixtures	Clubs remaining
First round	Sunday 3 March 1985	16	32 → 16
Second round	Wednesday 20 March 1985	8	8 → 4
Quarter-finals	Wednesday 3 April 1985	4	8 → 4
Semi-finals	Wednesday 17 April 1985	2	4 → 2
Final	Sunday 11 August 1985	1	2 → 1

== First round ==
2 March 1985	Cardiff (2)	0–1	Newcastle Rosebud United (1)	Newcastle
		Report	D. Jones 39'	Stadium: Adamstown Oval; Attendance: 1,250; Referee: Jim Reeves

2 March 1985	Sydney City (1)	3–0	St George-Budapest (1)	Sydney
	Kosmina 46', 49' (pen.), 59'	Report		Stadium: Wentworth Park; Attendance: 1,000; Referee: Rob Davies

3 March 1985	Adelaide Croatia (2)	1–0	Adelaide City (1)	Adelaide
	Timar 46'	Report		Stadium: Hindmarsh Stadium; Attendance: 2,300; Referee: Don Campbell

3 March 1985	West Torrens Birkalla (2)	0–5	West Adelaide (1)	Adelaide
		Report	Pietrus 9' (o.g.); Stamatelopoulos 36'; Konstandopoulos 50'; Price 74'; Hiern 89'	Stadium: Hindmarsh Stadium; Attendance: 2,300; Referee: Tony Martell

3 March 1985	Blacktown City (1)	2–3 (a.e.t.)	APIA Leichhardt (1)	Sydney
	O'Connor 52'; Larkin 85'	Report	Caban 15', 105'; Colagirui 30'	Stadium: Gabbie Stadium; Attendance: 752; Referee: Rob Davies

3 March 1985	Brisbane Lions (1)	2–0	Ipswich United (2)	Brisbane
	Cairney 61'; Anderson 86'	Report		Stadium: Richlands Stadium; Attendance: 1,237; Referee: Alan Kibbler

3 March 1985	Brunswick Juventus (1)	0–2	Melbourne Croatia (1)	Melbourne
		Report	Biskic 63'; Cristaldo 78'	Stadium: Olympic Park; Attendance: 3,000; Referee: Jim Fearn

3 March 1985	Canberra City (1)	3–2 (a.e.t.)	Rockdale Ilinden (2)	Queanbeyan
	Harkins 88'; Brown 89' (o.g.); Sermanni 112'	Report	Wilson 50'; Ristevski 60'	Stadium: Seiffert Oval; Attendance: 1,403; Referee: Neil Murray

3 March 1985	Inter Monaro (1)	9–1	West Woden Juventus (2)	Queanbeyan
	Giampaolo ?', ?', ?'; Willox ?', ?'; Ambrosino ?'; Valeri ?'; Thamnides ?'	Report	Kawaleva ?'	Stadium: Seiffert Oval; Attendance: 1,403; Referee: Bob Marshall

3 March 1985	Footscray JUST (1)	1–3	Green Gully (1)	Melbourne
	Lazopoulos 81'	Report	Smart 16'; Lucchesi 59'; Lewis 65'	Stadium: B.T. Connor Reserve; Attendance: 5,000; Referee: Jim Fokianos

3 March 1985	Preston Makedonia (1)	1–0	South Melbourne (1)	Melbourne
	Smith 57'	Report		Stadium: B.T. Connor Reserve; Attendance: 5,000; Referee: Stewart Mellings

3 March 1985	Heidelberg United (1)	1–0	Morwell Falcons (2)	Melbourne
	Stevenson 76'	Report		Stadium: Olympic Village; Referee: Bernie Upjohn

3 March 1985	Marconi Fairfield (1)	0–1	Brisbane City (1)	Sydney
		Report	Mengotti 77'	Stadium: Marconi Stadium; Attendance: 800; Referee: Ken Smith

3 March 1985	Sunshine George Cross (1)	5–1	Juventus Pioneer (2)	Melbourne
	Richardson 18'; Cochrane 42' (o.g.); Gilder 43'; Latif 57'; Lennon 70'	Report	Morton 82'	Stadium: Olympic Village; Referee: Chris Bambridge

3 March 1985	Sydney Olympic (1)	2–1	Penrith City (1)	Sydney
	Soper 35'; Lambropoulos 51'	Report	Ainsworth 79'	Stadium: St George Stadium; Attendance: 3,454; Referee: Arthur Owens

3 March 1985	Wollongong City (1)	3–2	Sydney Croatia (1)	Wollongong
	Giannone 22'; Kerr 28'; Godzik 36'	Report	Patikas 63'; Vidaic 78'	Stadium: Wollongong Showground; Attendance: 1,500; Referee: Roger Doenau

== Second round ==
19 March 1985	Brisbane City (1)	1–2	Brisbane Lions (1)	Brisbane
	Reis 54'	Report	Cairney 6'; Milovanovic 85' (o.g.)	Stadium: Spencer Park; Attendance: 1,231; Referee: Bill Monteverde

19 March 1985	Inter Monaro (1)	0–1	Canberra City (1)	Queanbeyan
		Report	English 62'	Stadium: Seiffert Oval; Attendance: 1,222; Referee: Bob Marshall

20 March 1985	Heidelberg United (1)	1–2 (a.e.t.)	Preston Makedonia (1)	Melbourne
	Tasios 23'	Report	Spink 87'; Cole 103'	Stadium: Olympic Park; Attendance: 6,000; Referee: Bernie Upjohn

20 March 1985	Melbourne Croatia (1)	0–2	Sunshine George Cross (1)	Melbourne
		Report	Gilder 65'; Maclaren 88'	Stadium: Olympic Park; Attendance: 6,000; Referee: Dennis Voutsinas

20 March 1985	Newcastle Rosebud United (1)	3–2	Wollongong City (1)	Newcastle
	D. Jones 43', 63'; McQuarrie 65'	Report	Kotamanidis 13'; Giannone 19'	Stadium: Adamstown Oval; Attendance: 1,073; Referee: Richard Lorenc

20 March 1985	Sydney City (1)	1–2	Green Gully (1)	Sydney
	Fletcher 72'	Report	Williams 11'; Smallman 59'	Stadium: St George Stadium; Attendance: 4,200; Referee: Terry Seacy

20 March 1985	Sydney Olympic (1)	2–0	APIA Leichhardt (1)	Sydney
	Phillips 76' (pen.); Kalantzis 90'	Report		Stadium: St George Stadium; Attendance: 4,200; Referee: Jim Reeves

20 March 1985	West Adelaide (1)	0–1	Adelaide Croatia (2)	Adelaide
		Report	Blute 54'	Stadium: Hindmarsh Stadium; Attendance: 2,400; Referee: Jim Rossis

== Quarter-finals ==
3 April 1985	Adelaide Croatia Raiders (2)	0–1 (a.e.t.)	Sunshine George Cross (1)	Adelaide
		Report	Latif 93'	Stadium: Hindmarsh Stadium; Attendance: 1,000; Referee: Don Campbell

3 April 1985	Preston Makedonia (1)	3–1	Green Gully (1)	Melbourne
	Ilioski 16'; Smith 35', 38'	Report	Lucchesi 83'	Stadium: Olympic Park; Attendance: 1,500; Referee: Jim Fearn

3 April 1985	Sydney Olympic (1)	1–1 (a.e.t.) (5–4 p)	Canberra City (1)	Sydney
	Theodorakopoulos 32'	Report	Lamond 75'	Stadium: St George Stadium; Attendance: 1,511; Referee: Richard Lorenc

10 April 1985	Newcastle Rosebud United (1)	1–0 (a.e.t.)	Brisbane Lions (1)	Newcastle
	Senkalski 98' (pen.)	Report		Stadium: Adamstown Oval; Attendance: 1,787; Referee: Gary Power

== Semi-finals ==
17 April 1985	Preston Makedonia (1)	2–1	Sunshine George Cross (1)	Melbourne
	Smith 75'; Cole 77' (pen.)	Report	Latif 44'	Stadium: Olympic Park; Attendance: 4,000; Referee: Chris Bambridge

17 April 1985	Sydney Olympic (1)	3–2 (a.e.t.)	Newcastle Rosebud United (1)	Sydney
	Phillips 3' (pen.), 60' (pen.); Koussas 94'	Report	Todd 7', 25'	Stadium: St George Stadium; Attendance: 3,155; Referee: Peter Rampley

== Final ==
11 August 1985
15:00 AEST

Sydney Olympic	2–1	Preston Makedonia
Soper 80'; Raskopoulos 82'	Report	Cole 13'

St George Stadium, Sydney
Attendance: 6,187
Referee: Don Campbell
