= 1984 NSL Cup =

National Soccer League Cup

Tournament details
- Country: Australia
- Dates: 22 May – 12 September 1984
- Teams: 24

Final positions
- Champions: Newcastle Rosebud United (1st title)
- Runners-up: Melbourne Knights

Tournament statistics
- Matches played: 43
- Goals scored: 104 (2.42 per match)
- Attendance: 63,458 (1,476 per match)

The 1984 NSL Cup was the eighth edition of the NSL Cup, which was the main national association football knockout cup competition in Australia. The competition was known as the Philips Cup under a sponsorship arrangement with Dutch company Philips.

Sydney Olympic were the defending champions, having defeated Heidelberg United to win their first title in the previous year's final, but they were eliminated in the group stage.

Newcastle Rosebud United defeated Melbourne Knights 1–0 in the final to win their first NSL Cup title.

== Teams ==
The NSL Cup was a knockout competition with 24 teams taking part all trying to reach the Final in September 1984. The competition consisted of the 24 teams from the National Soccer League (12 from the Northern Conference and 12 from the Southern Conference).

Round	Main date	Number of fixtures	Clubs remaining
Group stage	Sunday 3 June 1984	36	24 → 8
Quarter-finals	Monday 11 June 1984	4	8 → 4
Semi-finals	Wednesday 29 August 1984	2	4 → 2
Final	Wednesday 12 September 1984	1	2 → 1

== Group stage ==
=== Group 1 ===
Pos	Team	Pld	W	D	L	GF	GA	GD	Pts	Qualification
1	Adelaide City	3	2	1	0	5	0	+5	5	Advance to Knockout stage
2	Sydney City	3	1	2	0	2	0	+2	4	Advance to Knockout stage
3	West Adelaide	3	0	2	1	0	1	−1	2	
4	Blacktown City	3	0	1	2	0	6	−6	1	

Source: RSSSF

22 May 1984	Blacktown City	0–3	Sydney City	Sydney
		Report	Bottalico 71'; Murray 75' (pen.); Fletcher 90'	Stadium: St George Stadium; Attendance: 400; Referee: Doug Rennie

23 May 1984	West Adelaide	0–1	Adelaide City	Adelaide
		Report	Maxwell 74'	Stadium: Hindmarsh Stadium; Referee: Don Campbell

27 May 1984	Adelaide City	4–0	Blacktown City	Adelaide
	Villani 5'; Tallerico 35'; Scarpa 65'; Flounders 83'	Report		Stadium: Hindmarsh Stadium; Attendance: 5,000; Referee: Mike Browning

27 May 1984	West Adelaide	0–0	Sydney City	Adelaide
		Report		Stadium: Hindmarsh Stadium; Attendance: 6,000; Referee: Jim Rossis

3 June 1984	Sydney City	0–0	Adelaide City	Sydney
		Report		Stadium: ES Marks Athletics Field; Attendance: 300; Referee: Doug Rennie

3 June 1984	Blacktown City	0–0	West Adelaide	Sydney
		Report		Stadium: Gabbie Stadium; Attendance: 1,100; Referee: Ken Small

=== Group 2 ===
Pos	Team	Pld	W	D	L	GF	GA	GD	Pts	Qualification
1	Penrith City	3	2	1	0	5	1	+4	5	Advance to Knockout stage
2	Melita Eagles	3	1	2	0	2	1	+1	4	
3	Canberra City	3	1	1	1	3	3	0	3	
4	Sydney Olympic	3	0	0	3	1	6	−5	0	

Source: RSSSF

22 May 1984	Penrith City	1–1	Canberra City	Sydney
	Nix 55'	Report	Perinovic 15'	Stadium: Melita Stadium; Attendance: 2,106; Referee: Terry Seacy

22 May 1984	Melita Eagles	1–0	Sydney Olympic	Sydney
	Johnston 37'	Report		Stadium: Melita Stadium; Attendance: 2,106; Referee: Peter Rampley

27 May 1984	Canberra City	2–1	Sydney Olympic	Canberra
	Phillips 22'; Jones 85'	Report	Koussas 67'	Stadium: Bruce Stadium; Attendance: 1,250; Referee: Neil Murray

27 May 1984	Penrith City	1–0	Melita Eagles	Sydney
	Cotton 3'	Report		Stadium: Cook Park; Attendance: 1,959; Referee: Graham Warne

3 June 1984	Sydney Olympic	0–3	Penrith City	Sydney
		Report	Fitzharris 22'; Easthorpe 86', 88'	Stadium: ES Marks Athletics Field; Attendance: 400; Referee: Gary Power

3 June 1984	Melita Eagles	1–0	Canberra City	Sydney
	Wilson 27'	Report		Stadium: Gabbie Stadium; Attendance: 1,100; Referee: Terry Seacy

=== Group 3 ===
Pos	Team	Pld	W	D	L	GF	GA	GD	Pts	Qualification
1	APIA Leichhardt	3	3	0	0	4	0	+4	6	Advance to Knockout stage
2	Newcastle Rosebud United	3	2	0	1	6	3	+3	4	Advance to Knockout stage
3	St George-Budapest	3	1	0	2	3	7	−4	2	
4	Wollongong City	3	0	0	3	2	5	−3	0	

Source: RSSSF

22 May 1984	St George-Budapest	0–2	APIA Leichhardt	Sydney
		Report	DeCeglie 21'; Morsello 56'	Stadium: St George Stadium; Attendance: 400; Referee: Gary Power

23 May 1984	Newcastle Rosebud United	2–1	Wollongong City	Sydney
	Fontana 18' (o.g.); Senkalski 35' (pen.)	Report	Kotamindis 45'	Stadium: Marconi Stadium; Attendance: 979; Referee: Arthur Owens

27 May 1984	APIA Leichhardt	1–0	Newcastle Rosebud United	Sydney
	Genovese 84'	Report		Stadium: St George Stadium; Attendance: 500; Referee: Gary Power

27 May 1984	St George-Budapest	2–1	Wollongong City	Sydney
	Marton 46'; Batten 83'	Report	Beggs 8'	Stadium: St George Stadium; Attendance: 200; Referee: Doug Rennie

3 June 1984	Wollongong City	0–1	APIA Leichhardt	Wollongong
		Report	Caban 2'	Stadium: Towradgi Park; Attendance: 600; Referee: Peter Rampley

3 June 1984	Newcastle Rosebud United	4–1	St George-Budapest	Newcastle
	Todd 2', 49'; Maier 52'; Boogaard 84'	Report	Barton 34'	Stadium: Adamstown Oval; Attendance: 1,638; Referee: Jim Reeves

=== Group 4 ===
Pos	Team	Pld	W	D	L	GF	GA	GD	Pts	Qualification
1	Brisbane Lions	3	1	2	0	2	1	+1	4	Advance to Knockout stage
2	Sydney Croatia	3	1	1	1	5	4	+1	3	
3	Brisbane City	3	1	1	1	5	5	0	3	
4	Marconi Fairfield	3	1	0	2	3	5	−2	2	

Source: RSSSF

23 May 1984	Brisbane City	1–1	Brisbane Lions	Brisbane
	Hamilton 39'	Report	R. Stewart 2'	Stadium: Perry Park; Attendance: 1,000; Referee: Gordon Nicholson

23 May 1984	Marconi Fairfield	0–1	Sydney Croatia	Sydney
		Report	Kovacic 24' (pen.)	Stadium: Marconi Stadium; Attendance: 979; Referee: Richard Lorenc

27 May 1984	Brisbane City	1–2	Marconi Fairfield	Brisbane
	Falco 6'	Report	Carter 35'; Liddell 90' (o.g.)	Stadium: Spencer Park; Attendance: 900; Referee: Dave Nugent

27 May 1984	Sydney Croatia	0–0	Brisbane Lions	Sydney
		Report		Stadium: King Tomislav Park; Attendance: 2,150; Referee: Richard Lorenc

3 June 1984	Sydney Croatia	1–2	Brisbane City	Sydney
	Savor 54'	Report	Hamilton 64'; Liddell 79'	Stadium: King Tomislav Park; Attendance: 1,400; Referee: Graham Warne

3 June 1984	Brisbane Lions	1–0	Marconi Fairfield	Brisbane
	Niven 87' (pen.)	Report		Stadium: Richlands Stadium; Attendance: 800; Referee: Alan Kibbler

=== Group 5 ===
Pos	Team	Pld	W	D	L	GF	GA	GD	Pts	Qualification
1	Footscray JUST	3	2	0	1	3	2	+1	4	Advance to Knockout stage
2	South Melbourne	3	1	2	0	2	1	+1	4	
3	Sunshine George Cross	3	1	1	1	6	5	+1	3	
4	Brunswick Juventus	3	0	1	2	2	5	−3	1	

Source: RSSSF

22 May 1984	South Melbourne	1–1	Sunshine George Cross	Melbourne
	Karantonis 88'	Report	Latif 57'	Stadium: Olympic Park; Attendance: 1,500; Referee: Evan Venios

22 May 1984	Brunswick Juventus	0–1	Footscray JUST	Melbourne
		Report	Karic 83'	Stadium: Olympic Park; Attendance: 1,500; Referee: Jim Fearn

26 May 1984	Sunshine George Cross	1–2	Footscray JUST	Melbourne
	Latif 18'	Report	McDowall 24'; Caban 83'	Stadium: Middle Park Soccer Stadium; Attendance: 1,000; Referee: Vince Celestino

26 May 1984	South Melbourne	0–0	Brunswick Juventus	Melbourne
		Report		Stadium: Middle Park Soccer Stadium; Attendance: 1,000; Referee: Neil Murray

1 June 1984	Brunswick Juventus	2–4	Sunshine George Cross	Melbourne
	Campelj 50' (o.g.); Minichiello 80'	Report	Richardson 21'; R. Maclaren 21' (pen.); Toal 41' (pen.); Jovanovic 70'	Stadium: Olympic Park; Attendance: 400; Referee: Evan Venios

1 June 1984	South Melbourne	1–0	Footscray JUST	Melbourne
	Yzendoorn 46'	Report		Stadium: Olympic Park; Attendance: 400; Referee: Bernie Upjohnn

=== Group 6 ===
Pos	Team	Pld	W	D	L	GF	GA	GD	Pts	Qualification
1	Melbourne Croatia	3	3	0	0	10	5	+5	6	Advance to Knockout stage
2	Heidelberg United	3	2	0	1	5	5	0	4	
3	Preston Makedonia	3	1	0	2	4	5	−1	2	
4	Green Gully	3	0	0	3	5	9	−4	0	

Source: RSSSF

23 May 1984	Green Gully	1–2	Heidelberg United	Melbourne
	Wade 77'	Report	Tzintzis 30'; Winn 40'	Stadium: Olympic Park; Attendance: 1,800; Referee: Jim Fokianos

23 May 1984	Melbourne Croatia	2–1	Preston Makedonia	Melbourne
	Parton 18'; Markovic 77'	Report	Odzakov 60'	Stadium: Olympic Park; Attendance: 1,800; Referee: Sam Zoumas

26 May 1984	Green Gully	3–4	Melbourne Croatia	Melbourne
	Lewis 47'; Carter 63'; Wade 87'	Report	Brogan 4', 15', 20'; Parton 66'	Stadium: Olympic Village; Attendance: 1,200

26 May 1984	Preston Makedonia	0–2	Heidelberg United	Melbourne
		Report	Patterson 30'; Tzintzis 35'	Stadium: Olympic Village; Attendance: 1,200

2 June 1984	Green Gully	1–3	Preston Makedonia	Melbourne
	Lewis 12'	Report	Petrovski 15'; Dunn 25'; Heys 62'	Stadium: Olympic Park; Attendance: 2,000; Referee: Terry Seacy

2 June 1984	Heidelberg United	1–4	Melbourne Croatia	Melbourne
	Patterson 54'	Report	Biskic 23'; Cumming 31'; Markovac 69', 87'	Stadium: Olympic Park; Attendance: 2,000; Referee: Peter Rampley

=== Ranking of second-placed teams ===
Pos	Grp	Team	Pld	W	D	L	GF	GA	GD	Pts	Qualification
1	3	Newcastle Rosebud United	3	2	0	1	6	3	+3	4	Advance to Knockout stage
2	1	Sydney City	3	1	2	0	2	0	+2	4	Advance to Knockout stage
3	2	Melita Eagles	3	1	2	0	2	1	+1	4	
4	5	South Melbourne	3	1	2	0	2	1	+1	4	
5	6	Heidelberg United	3	2	0	1	5	5	0	4	
6	4	Sydney Croatia	3	1	1	1	5	4	+1	3	

Source: RSSSF

== Knockout stage ==
=== Quarter-finals ===
9 June 1984	Penrith City	0–2	APIA Leichhardt	Sydney
15:00 AEST		Report	Caban 11', 84'	Stadium: Cook Park; Attendance: 530; Referee: Arthur Owens

10 June 1984	Adelaide City	2–3	Footscray JUST	Sydney
14:30 AEST	Maxwell 57'; Tallerico 83'	Report	Lujic 48'; Paton 70'; Caban 118'	Stadium: Olympic Sports Field; Attendance: 2,300; Referee: Tony Martell

11 June 1984	Melbourne Croatia	2–1 (a.e.t.)	Brisbane Lions	Melbourne
15:00 AEST	Brogan 95', 112' (pen.)	Report	McDonagh 104'	Stadium: Olympic Park; Attendance: 1,500; Referee: Chris Bambridge

11 June 1984	Newcastle Rosebud United	3–0	Sydney City	Newcastle
14:30 AEST	Milosevic 75', 88'; Boogaard 79'	Report		Stadium: Adamstown Oval; Attendance: 1,350; Referee: Rob Davies

=== Semi-finals ===
29 August 1984	APIA Leichhardt	0–2	Newcastle Rosebud United	Sydney
		Report	Todd 4'; Senkalski 42'	Stadium: St George Stadium; Attendance: 500; Referee: Tim Davies

29 August 1984	Footscray JUST	0–1	Melbourne Croatia	Melbourne
		Report	Cumming 40'	Stadium: Olympic Park; Attendance: 4,211; Referee: Sam Zoumas

=== Final ===
12 September 1984

Melbourne Knights	0–1	Newcastle Rosebud United
	Report	Todd 29'

Olympic Park, Melbourne
Attendance: 4,000
Referee: Stewart Mellings
