= 1980 NSL Cup =

National Soccer League Cup

Tournament details
- Country: Australia
- Dates: 25 April – 15 October 1980
- Teams: 32

Final positions
- Champions: Marconi Fairfield (1st title)
- Runners-up: Heidelberg United

Tournament statistics
- Matches played: 32
- Goals scored: 110 (3.44 per match)
- Attendance: 75,824 (2,370 per match)

The 1980 NSL Cup was the fourth edition of the NSL Cup, which was the main national association football knockout cup competition in Australia.

Adelaide City were the defending champions, having defeated St George-Budapest to win their first title in the previous year's final, but they were eliminated in the semi-finals by finalist Heidelberg United.

Marconi Fairfield defeated Heidelberg United 3–0 via a replay after a 0–0 draw in the final to win their first NSL Cup title.

== Teams ==
The NSL Cup was a knockout competition with 32 teams taking part all trying to reach the Final in October 1980. The competition consisted of the 14 teams from the National Soccer League plus 18 teams from their respective top division state leagues.

Round	Main date	Number of fixtures	Clubs remaining
First round	Friday 25 April 1980	16	32 → 16
Second round	Sunday 6 July 1980	8	16 → 8
Quarter-finals	Sunday 3 August 1980	4	8 → 4
Semi-finals	Wednesday 10 September 1980	2	4 → 2
Final	Wednesday 15 October 1980	2	2 → 1

== Bracket ==
First round
Brisbane City	0
Mt Gravatt	1
Brisbane Lions	3
Grange Thistle	0
Ipswich Knights	0
APIA Leichhardt Tigers	1
Sydney Croatia	1
Sydney City	7
Blacktown City	2
Sutherland Sharks	0
St George-Budapest	2
Inter Monaro	1
Marconi Fairfield	3
Melita-Eagles-Newtown	0
Newcastle KB United	3
Edgeworth FC	0
Canberra City	7
Croatia Deakin	2
Rapid-Wrest Point	1
Preston Makedonia	5
South Melbourne	5
Frankston Pines	1
Heidelberg United	3
Essendon Croatia	2
Footscray JUST	2
Green Gully Ajax (a.e.t.)	3
Adelaide City	5
Enfield Victoria	0
Beograd SSC	3
Cumberland United	2
Spearwood Dalmatinac	2
West Adelaide	1

Round of 16
Mt Gravatt	2
Brisbane Lions	4
APIA Leichhardt Tigers	1
Sydney City	2
Blacktown City	0
St George-Budapest	3
Marconi Fairfield	3
Newcastle KB United	1
Canberra City	3
Preston Makedonia	2
South Melbourne	1
Heidelberg United	2
Green Gully Ajax	1
Adelaide City	3
Beograd SSC	0
Spearwood Dalmatinac	3

Quarter-finals
Brisbane Lions	2
Sydney City	1
St George-Budapest	0
Marconi Fairfield	4
Canberra City	0
Heidelberg United	2
Adelaide City	1
Spearwood Dalmatinac	0

Semi-finals
Brisbane Lions	0
Marconi Fairfield	1
Heidelberg United (a.e.t.)	1
Adelaide City	0

Final
Marconi Fairfield	3
Heidelberg United	0

== First round ==
25 April 1980	Adelaide City (1)	5–0	Enfield Victoria (2)	Adelaide
	J. Nyskohus 20', 66', 71' (pen.); Marocchi 51'; Muniz 87'	Report		Stadium: Olympic Sports Field; Referee: Bobby Kerr

25 April 1980	Beogard Woodville (2)	3–2	Cumberland United (2)	Adelaide
	Santrac 6'; Evans 50', 84'	Report	Parks 14'; Mahoney 79'	Stadium: Hindmarsh Stadium

25 April 1980	Blacktown City (1)	2–0	Sutherland (2)	Sydney
	Amey 67' (pen.); Pollard 89'	Report		Stadium: Gabbie Stadium; Attendance: 1,024; Referee: Richard Lorenc

25 April 1980	Brisbane City (1)	0–1	Mount Gravatt (2)	Brisbane
		Report	Bland 81'	Stadium: Perry Park; Attendance: 1,000; Referee: Dave Nugent

25 April 1980	Brisbane Lions (1)	3–0	Grange Thistle (2)	Brisbane
	McGregor 54'; Lindsay 61'; Ontong 70'	Report		Stadium: Lions Stadium; Referee: Jack Wood

25 April 1980	Canberra City (1)	7–2	Canberra Deakin (2)	Canberra
15:00 AEST	Giampaolo ?', ?'; Valeri ?', ?'; Byrne ?'; J. O'Shea ?'; Maclaren ?'	Report	Bull ?'; Dukic ?'	Stadium: Bruce Stadium; Attendance: 2,800; Referee: Ken Allen

25 April 1980	Edgeworth Eagles (2)	0–3	Newcastle KB United (1)	Newcastle
		Report	Trenter 20'; Kamasz 80'; Drinkwater 90' (pen.)	Stadium: Jack McLaughlin Park; Attendance: 2,500; Referee: Jim Reeves

25 April 1980	Footscray JUST (1)	2–2 (a.e.t.) (4–5 p)	Green Gully (2)	Melbourne
	Lujic 26'; Ollerton 99' (pen.)	Report	Morrey 19'; Belic 118' (o.g.)	Stadium: Middle Park Soccer Stadium; Attendance: 3,000; Referee: Evan Venios

25 April 1980	South Melbourne (1)	5–1	Frankston City (2)	Melbourne
	Campbell 10', 37'; Christopoulos 35', 65'; Cummings 87'	Report	Wall 75'	Stadium: Middle Park Soccer Stadium; Attendance: 3,000; Referee: Jim Fearn

25 April 1980	Heidelberg United (1)	2–0	Essendon Croatia (2)	Melbourne
	Bannon ?'; Selemidis ?'	Report		Stadium: Olympic Park; Attendance: 4,800; Referee: Stewart Mellings

25 April 1980	Ipswich United (2)	0–1	APIA Leichhardt (1)	Ipswich
		Report	Samuels 13'	Referee: Des Miles

25 April 1980	Marconi Fairfield (1)	3–0	Melita Eagles (2)	Sydney
	Cant 12'; Krncevic ?', ?'	Report		Stadium: Marconi Oval; Attendance: 3,889

25 April 1980	Rapid Wrest Point (2)	1–5	Preston Makedonia (2)	Hobart
	Willis 40'	Report	Lucchesi 5'; Ward 20', 66'; Beech 59'; McMillan 79'	Stadium: South Hobart Oval; Attendance: 1,200; Referee: Jack Johnston

25 April 1980	St George-Budapest (1)	4–1	Inter Monaro (2)	Sydney
	Beggs 30', 47' (pen.); Duarte 62'; Santolin 28' (o.g.)	Report		Stadium: St George Stadium; Attendance: 720; Referee: Tim Davies

25 April 1980	Spearwood Dalmatinac (2)	3–1	West Adelaide (1)	Perth
	Flamengo 45' (pen.), 61'; Popovich ?'	Report	Kosmina 24' (pen.)	Stadium: Dalmatinac Park; Referee: Eddie Evans

25 April 1980	Sydney City (1)	7–1	Sydney Croatia (2)	Sydney
	M. Silva ?', ?', ?'; Boden ?', ?'; Barnes ?'; Souness ?'	Report	Mullen ?'	Stadium: ES Marks Athletics Field; Attendance: 2,041; Referee: Peter Rampley

== Second round ==
2 July 1980	Beogard Woodville (2)	0–3	Spearwood Dalmatinac (2)	Adelaide
		Report	Fidoe 77', 86', 88'	Stadium: Hindmarsh Stadium; Attendance: 500; Referee: Ken Allen

5 July 1980	Newcastle KB United (1)	1–3	Marconi Fairfield (1)	Newcastle
	Burrows 4'	Report	Raskopoulos 39', 50'; Brogan 21'	Stadium: Newcastle International Sports Centre; Attendance: 4,989; Referee: Chris Bambridge

6 July 1980	APIA Leichhardt (1)	1–2	Sydney City (1)	Sydney
	Harding 40'	Report	Barnes 70', 90+5'	Stadium: Lambert Park; Attendance: 2,540; Referee: Jack Johnston

6 July 1980	Blacktown City (1)	0–3	St George-Budapest (1)	Sydney
		Report	Katholos 41'; Beggs 46'; Duarte 85'	Stadium: Gabbie Stadium; Attendance: 3,000; Referee: Dave Nugent

6 July 1980	Mount Gravatt (2)	2–4 (a.e.t.)	Brisbane Lions	Brisbane
	Thompson 67' (pen.); Reid 84'	Report	Bennett 19'; Wilson 65'; McNaughton 92', 108'	Stadium: Perry Park; Attendance: 800; Referee: Peter Rampley

16 July 1980	Canberra City (1)	3–2 (a.e.t.)	Preston Makedonia (2)	Queanbeyan
20:00 AEST	Valeri 50', 109' (pen.); Cole 52'	Report	McMillman 74'; Lucchesi 79'	Stadium: Seiffert Oval; Attendance: 3,500; Referee: Tony Boskovic

23 July 1980	Adelaide City (1)	3–1	Green Gully (2)	Adelaide
	Barnes 19'; J. Nyskohus 45' (pen.); Northcote 68'	Report	Segi 65'	Stadium: Hindmarsh Stadium; Attendance: 1,720; Referee: Stewart Mellings

23 July 1980	Heidelberg United (1)	2–1	South Melbourne (1)	Melbourne
	Yzendoorn 55'; Cole 76'	Report	Rogers 30'	Stadium: Olympic Park; Attendance: 7,232; Referee: Henry Witschge

== Quarter-finals ==
3 August 1980	Brisbane Lions (1)	2–1	Sydney City (1)	Brisbane
	Hermiston 50' (pen.); Millman 67'	Report	Bruce 86'	Stadium: Lions Stadium; Attendance: 1,800; Referee: Ken Allen

3 August 1980	Canberra City (1)	0–2	Heidelberg United (1)	Canberra
14:30 AEST		Report	Selemidis 45'; Paton 89'	Stadium: Bruce Stadium; Attendance: 2,050; Referee: Richard Lorenc

3 August 1980	Marconi Fairfield (1)	4–0	St George-Budapest (1)	Sydney
	Krncevic 28', 82'; Byrne 34' (pen.); Jankovics 47'	Report		Stadium: Marconi Oval; Attendance: 3,652; Referee: Henry Witschge

3 August 1980	Spearwood Dalmatinac (2)	0–1 (a.e.t.)	Adelaide City (1)	Perth
		Report	Melta 100'	Stadium: Dalmatinac Park; Attendance: 2,000; Referee: Barry Harwood

== Semi-finals ==
10 September 1980	Heidelberg United (1)	0–0 (a.e.t.) (3–1 p)	Adelaide City (1)	Melbourne
		Report		Stadium: Olympic Park; Attendance: 3,000; Referee: Tim Davies

10 September 1980	Marconi Fairfield (1)	1–0	Brisbane Lions (1)	Sydney
	Krncevic 3'	Report		Stadium: Marconi Oval; Attendance: 1,500; Referee: Jack Johnston

== Final ==
4 October 1980

Heidelberg United	0–0 (a.e.t.)	Marconi Fairfield
	Report

Olympic Park, Melbourne
Attendance: 6,388
Referee: Jack Johnston
15 October 1980
19:30 AEDT

Marconi Fairfield	3–0	Heidelberg United
Byrne 17' (pen.); Krncevic 64'; Sharne 87'	Report

Marconi Oval, Sydney
Attendance: 5,179
Referee: Jack Johnston
