= 1987 NSL Cup final =

Sydney Croatia and South Melbourne Cup Association football match 1987

- Event: 1987 NSL Cup
Sydney Croatia	South Melbourne
2	0
- on aggregate

First leg
Sydney Croatia	South Melbourne
1	0
- Date: 14 October 1987
- Venue: St George Stadium, Sydney
- Referee: Rob Davies
- Attendance: 3,845

Second leg
South Melbourne	Sydney Croatia
0	1
- Date: 18 October 1987
- Venue: Olympic Park, Melbourne
- Attendance: 3,900

The 1987 NSL Cup final was the 11th final of the NSL Cup. The final was contested in a two-legged home-and-away format between Sydney Croatia and South Melbourne. The first leg was hosted by Sydney Croatia at St George Stadium in Sydney on 14 October 1987, while the second leg was hosted by South Melbourne at Olympic Park in Melbourne on 18 October 1987. Sydney Croatia won 2–0 on aggregate to win their first NSL Cup title.

== Route to the final ==
Sydney Croatia		Round	South Melbourne	
Opponent	Score		Opponent	Score
APIA Leichhardt	2–1 (H)	First round	Bye	
St George-Budapest	3–0 (H)	Quarter-finals	Preston Makedonia	2–0 (A)
Heidelberg United	1–1 (5–4 p) (H)	Semi-finals	Marconi Fairfield	4–1 (H)
Note: In all results above, the score of the finalist is given first (H: home; A: away).

=== Sydney Croatia ===
Sydney Croatia started their 1987 NSL Cup campaign by winning against locals APIA Leichhardt 2–1 in the first round at home on. They defeated St George-Budapest 3–0 in the quarter-finals. In the semi-finals, they won on penalties against Heidelberg United to progress to their first NSL Cup Final.

=== South Melbourne ===
South Melbourne had a bye in the first round of this NSL campaign until they won 2–0 against Preston Makedonia in the quarter-finals. The semi-final was won 4–1 against Marconi Fairfield to progress to the Final.

== Matches ==
=== First leg ===
==== Details ====
14 October 1987
19:30 AEDT

Sydney Croatia	1–0	South Melbourne
Slater 85'	Report

St George Stadium, Sydney
Attendance: 3,845
Referee: Rob Davies

GK	22	(Australia) Greg Woodhouse
DF	8	(Australia) Wally Savor
DF	4	(Australia) Ray Vliestra
DF	5	(Socialist Federal Republic of Yugoslavia) Vedran Rožić
DF	3	(Australia) Graham Jennings
DF	12	(Australia) Mark Jones
DF	14	(Socialist Federal Republic of Yugoslavia) Ante Rumora
MF	11	(Australia) Zarko Odzakov
MF	7	(Australia) Robbie Slater
FW	9	(Australia) Graham Arnold
FW	15	(Papua New Guinea) Manis Lamond	(substituted off) 55'
Substitutes:
MF	6	(Australia) Shane Clinch	(substituted on) 55'
Head coach:
(Socialist Federal Republic of Yugoslavia) Vedran Rožić

GK	1	(Australia) Peter Laumets
DF	2	(Scotland) Bobby Russell
DF	5	(Australia) Steve Blair
DF	12	(Australia) Manny Anezakis
DF	3	(Australia) Ange Postecoglou
DF	8	(South Africa) Richard Miranda
MF	6	(Australia) Paul Wade
MF	4	(Australia) Garry McDowall
MF	7	(Scotland) Danny Crainie
FW	9	(Australia) Charlie Egan
FW	10	(Australia) Danny Wright
Head coach:
(Australia) Brian Garvey

=== Second leg ===
==== Details ====
18 October 1987
14:30 AEDT

South Melbourne	0–1	Sydney Croatia
	Report	Arnold (?)

Olympic Park, Melbourne
Attendance: 3,900

GK	1	(Australia) Peter Laumets
DF	2	(Scotland) Bobby Russell
DF	5	(Australia) Steve Blair
DF	12	(Australia) Manny Anezakis
DF	3	(Australia) Ange Postecoglou
DF	8	(South Africa) Richard Miranda	(substituted off) 72'
MF	6	(Australia) Paul Wade
MF	4	(Australia) Garry McDowall
MF	7	(Scotland) Danny Crainie
FW	9	(Australia) Charlie Egan
FW	10	(Australia) Danny Wright
Substitutes:
MF	14	(Australia) Steve Tasios	(substituted on) 72'
Head coach:
(Australia) Brian Garvey

GK	22	(Australia) Greg Woodhouse
DF	8	(Australia) Wally Savor
DF	4	(Australia) Ray Vliestra
DF	5	(Socialist Federal Republic of Yugoslavia) Vedran Rožić
DF	3	(Australia) Graham Jennings
DF	12	(Australia) Mark Jones
DF	14	(Socialist Federal Republic of Yugoslavia) Ante Rumora
MF	2	(Australia) David Rezo
MF	11	(Australia) Zarko Odzakov
MF	7	(Australia) Robbie Slater
FW	9	(Australia) Graham Arnold
Head coach:
(Socialist Federal Republic of Yugoslavia) Vedran Rožić
