= 1985 NSL Cup final =

- Event: 1985 NSL Cup
Sydney Olympic	Preston Makedonia
2	1
- Date: 12 September 1985
- Venue: St George Stadium, Sydney
- Referee: Don Campbell
- Attendance: 6,187

The 1985 NSL Cup final was the final match of the 1985 NSL Cup, the ninth season of the National Soccer League Cup. It was played at St George Stadium in Sydney on 11 August 1985 between Sydney Olympic and Preston Makedonia. Sydney Olympic won the match 2–1 for their second NSL Cup title.

== Route to the final ==
Sydney Olympic		Round	Preston Makedonia	
Opposition	Score	Round	Opposition	Score
Penrith City (H)	2–1	R1	South Melbourne (H)	1–0
APIA Leichhardt (H)	2–0	R2	Heidelberg United (A)	2–1 (a.e.t.)
Canberra City (H)	1–1 (a.e.t.) (5–4 p)	QF	Green Gully (H)	3–1
Newcastle Rosebud United (H)	3–2 (a.e.t.)	SF	Sunshine George Cross (H)	2–1
Key: (H) = Home venue; (A) = Away venue

== Match ==
=== Details ===
11 August 1985
15:00 AEST

Sydney Olympic	2–1	Preston Makedonia
Soper 80'; Raskopoulos 82'	Report	Cole 13'

St George Stadium, Sydney
Attendance: 6,187
Referee: Don Campbell

GK	(Australia) Gary Meier
DF	(England) Martyn Rogers
DF	(Australia) Graham Jennings
DF	(Australia) Jim Ziras	Yellow card
DF	(Australia) Alex Lambropoulos
DF	(Australia) Stuart Johnston
MF	(Australia) Peter Raskopoulos
MF	(Australia) Peter Katholos		(substituted off) 87'
MF	(England) Simon Ogun
MF	(Australia) Mark Koussas		(substituted off) 67'
FW	(Australia) Marshall Soper
Substitutes:
MF	(Australia) George Haniotis		(substituted on) 87'
FW	(Australia) Chris Polias		(substituted on) 67'
Head Coach:
(Australia) Manfred Schaefer

GK	(Australia) Phil Traianedes
DF	(Scotland) George McMillan
DF	(England) Ian Dobson
DF	(Australia) Robbie Dunn
DF	(Australia) Con Opasinis
MF	(Australia) George Petrov
MF	(Australia) Zoran Ilioski
FW	(England) Graham Heys
FW	(Australia) Sean Lane
FW	(Australia) Steve Smith
FW	(Australia) Gary Cole	Yellow card
Head Coach:
(Australia) Bill Murray

Match rules

- 90 minutes
- 30 minutes of extra time if necessary
- Penalty shoot-out if scores still level
