= 1987 NSL Cup =

National Soccer League Cup

Tournament details
- Country: Australia
- Dates: 8 April – 18 October 1987
- Teams: 13

Final positions
- Champions: Sydney Croatia (1st title)
- Runners-up: South Melbourne

Tournament statistics
- Matches played: 13
- Goals scored: 32 (2.46 per match)

The 1987 NSL Cup was the eleventh edition of the NSL Cup, which was the main national association football knockout cup competition in Australia. The NSL Cup was sponsored by Beach Fashions and known as the Beach Fashions Cup for sponsorship purposes.

Sydney City were the defending champions, having defeated Adelaide Hellas to win their first title in the previous year's final, but they withdrew the competition due to the Hakoah Social Club withdrawing its financial support.

Sydney Croatia defeated South Melbourne 2–0 on aggregate in the final to win their first NSL Cup title.

== Teams ==
The NSL Cup was a knockout competition with 13 teams taking part all trying to reach the Final in October 1987. The competition consisted of the 14 teams from the National Soccer League.

Round	Main date	Number of fixtures	Clubs remaining
First round	Wednesday 8 April 1987	6	14 → 8
Quarter-finals	Wednesday 13 May 1987	4	8 → 4
Semi-finals	Wednesday 27 May 1987	2	4 → 2
Final	Sunday 18 October 1987	2	2 → 1

== First round ==
Heidelberg United and South Melbourne had a bye for the First round.

8 April 1987	Adelaide City	1–1 (a.e.t.) (0–3 p)	Sunshine George Cross	Adelaide
	Melta 31'	Report	Parton 55'	Stadium: Hindmarsh Stadium; Referee: Don Campbell

8 April 1987	Brunswick Juventus	0–4	Melbourne Croatia	Melbourne
		Report	Campbell 32'; Lewis 50'; Humble 74'; McIntosh 90'	Stadium: Olympic Park; Referee: Sam Zoumas

8 April 1987	Footscray JUST	1–2 (a.e.t.)	Preston Makedonia	Melbourne
	Latif 37'	Report	Dobson 65'; Smith 95'	Stadium: Olympic Park; Referee: Sam Zoumas

15 April 1987	St George-Budapest	0–0 (a.e.t.) (5–3 p)	Sydney Olympic	Sydney
		Report		Stadium: St George Stadium; Referee: Richard Lorenc

15 April 1987	Sydney Croatia	2–1	APIA Leichhardt	Sydney
	Arnold 59'; Slater 85'	Report	Ward 87'	Stadium: Croatian Sports Centre; Referee: Gary Power

Marconi Fairfield	w/o	Sydney City

== Quarter-finals ==
22 April 1987	Preston Makedonia	0–2	South Melbourne	Melbourne
		Report	Wright 21'; Postecoglou 62'	Stadium: Olympic Park; Referee: Chris Bambridge

29 April 1987	Sydney Croatia	3–0 (a.e.t.)	St George-Budapest	Sydney
	Arnold 93'; Jones 96'; Slater 108'	Report		Stadium: Croatian Sports Centre; Referee: Ken Small

6 May 1987	Heidelberg United	5–0	Melbourne Croatia	Melbourne
	McKinna 31', 87'; Tsolakis 32', 87'; Anastasiadis 66'	Report		Stadium: Olympic Park; Referee: Dennis Voutsinas

13 May 1987	Marconi Fairfield	1–0	Sunshine George Cross	Sydney
	Nastevski 45'	Report		Stadium: Croatian Sports Centre; Referee: Terry Seacy

== Semi-finals ==
20 May 1987	South Melbourne	4–1	Marconi Fairfield	Melbourne
	Egan 8', 45', 70'; Halford 60'	Report	Farina 90'	Stadium: Olympic Park; Referee: Chris Bambridge

27 May 1987	Sydney Croatia	1–1 (a.e.t.) (5–4 p)	Heidelberg United	Sydney
	Jones 47'	Report	Rozic 51' (o.g.)	Stadium: Croatian Sports Centre; Referee: Arthur Owens

== Final ==
14 October 1987
19:30 AEDT

Sydney Croatia	1–0	South Melbourne
Slater 85'	Report

St George Stadium, Sydney
Attendance: 3,845
Referee: Rob Davies
18 October 1987
14:30 AEDT

South Melbourne	0–1	Sydney Croatia
	Report	Arnold ?'

Olympic Park, Melbourne
Attendance: 3,900
