= 1993 NSL Cup final (April) =

- Event: 1992–93 NSL Cup
Heidelberg United	Parramatta Eagles
2	1
- Date: 18 April 1993
- Venue: Marconi Stadium, Sydney
- Referee: Rob Davies
- Attendance: 2,596

The 1993 NSL Cup final (April) was the final match of the 1992–93 NSL Cup, the 17th season of the National Soccer League Cup. It was played at Marconi Stadium in Sydney on 18 April 1993 between Heidelberg United and Parramatta Eagles. Heidelberg United won the match 2–1 for their first NSL Cup title.

== Route to the final ==
Heidelberg United		Round	Parramatta Eagles	
Opposition	Score	Round	Opposition	Score
Bye		R1	Newcastle Breakers	4–3 (agg.)
South Melbourne	7–4 (agg.)	R2	Brisbane United	4–3 (agg.)
Adelaide City (H)	1–0	SF	Sydney CSC (H)	2–1
Key: (H) = Home venue; (A) = Away venue

== Match ==
=== Details ===
18 April 1993

Heidelberg United	2–1	Parramatta Eagles
Scott 3'; Souris 87' (o.g.)	Report	Reda 80'

Marconi Stadium, Sydney
Attendance: 2,596
Referee: Rob Davies

GK
DF
DF
MF
MF
MF
MF
MF
FW
FW
FW
Substitutes:
FW
Head Coach:
(Federal Republic of Yugoslavia) Dragoslav Šekularac

(Australia) Michael Chatzitrifonos
(Australia) George Georgiadis
(Australia) Peter Tiktikakis	Yellow card
(Australia) Gary Brattan
(Australia) Alan Scott
(Australia) Derek Hunter
(Australia) Brian MacNicol
(Scotland) Alistair Dick	(substituted off) 73'
(Australia) George Slifkas
(Australia) Michael Michalakopoulos
(Australia) Angie Goutzioulis
(Australia) Danny Gnjidic	(substituted on) 73'

GK	(Australia) Peter Gunning
DF	(Australia) Paul Souris
DF	(Australia) Adam Ciantar
DF	(Costa Rica) Gerry Gomez
DF	(Australia) Robert Wheatley
DF	(Australia) Tom Haythornthwaite	(substituted off) 73'
MF	(Australia) Gabriel Mendez
MF	(Australia) Aytek Genc
MF	(Australia) Michael Reda
MF	(Australia) David Lowe	(substituted off) 58'
FW	(Australia) Marshall Soper
Substitutes:
DF	(Australia) Andrew Dowling	(substituted on) 73'
MF	(Australia) Zoki Adioski	(substituted on) 58'
Head Coach:
(Australia) Berti Mariani

Match rules

- 90 minutes
- 30 minutes of extra time if necessary
- Penalty shoot-out if scores still level
