= 1991–92 NSL Cup =

National Soccer League Cup

Tournament details
- Country: Australia
- Dates: 30 October 1991 – 5 April 1992
- Teams: 14

Final positions
- Champions: Adelaide City (3rd title)
- Runners-up: Marconi Fairfield

Tournament statistics
- Matches played: 13
- Attendance: 21,881 (1,683 per match)

The 1991–92 NSL Cup was the 16th edition of the NSL Cup, which was the main national association football knockout cup competition in Australia.

Melita Eagles were the defending champions, having defeated Preston Makedonia to win their first title in the previous year's final, but they were eliminated in the first round by Sydney Croatia.

Adelaide City defeated Marconi Fairfield 2–1 in the final to win their third NSL Cup title.

== Teams ==
The NSL Cup was a knockout competition with 14 teams taking part all trying to reach the Final in April 1992. The competition consisted of the 14 teams from the National Soccer League.

| Round | Main date | Number of fixtures | Clubs remaining |
|---|---|---|---|
| First round | Wednesday 30 October 1991 | 7 | 14 → 7 |
| Second round | Wednesday 4 December 1991 | 4 | 7 → 4 |
| Semi-finals | Wednesday 11 March 1992 | 2 | 4 → 2 |
| Final | Sunday 5 April 1992 | 1 | 2 → 1 |

== First round ==
| 30 October 1991 | Adelaide City | 1–0 | West Adelaide | Adelaide |
| | Maxwell 9' | Report | | Stadium: Hindmarsh Stadium; Attendance: 3,011; Referee: Tom McRoe |

| 30 October 1991 | Melbourne Knights | 3–1 | Heidelberg United | Melbourne |
| | Pondeljak 6'; Bacak 74', 87' | Report | Stubbins 84' | Stadium: Olympic Park; Attendance: 3,723; Referee: John Fraser |

| 30 October 1991 | Preston Makedonia | 4–2 | South Melbourne | Melbourne |
| | Jackson 22'; Spink 30'; Bekiaris 61', 63' | Report | Trimboli 53'; Boutsianis 74' | Stadium: Olympic Park; Attendance: 3,723; Referee: Ziggy Mnich |

| 30 October 1991 | Wollongong City | 1–0 | Sydney Olympic | Wollongong |
| | Hagan 41' | Report | | Stadium: Brandon Park; Attendance: 670; Referee: Manny Loupis |

| 6 November 1991 | Brisbane United | 2–1 (a.e.t.) | APIA Leichhardt | Brisbane |
| | Slater 98'; Pimblett 102' | Report | Jennings 119' | Stadium: Perry Park; Attendance: 712; Referee: Peter Hulme |

| 6 November 1991 | Melita Eagles | 1–2 | Sydney Croatia | Sydney |
| | Soper 18' | Report | Stanton 8'; Iriarte 87' | Stadium: Marconi Stadium; Attendance: 1,673; Referee: Richard Lorenc |

| 20 November 1991 | Newcastle Breakers | 0–3 | Marconi Fairfield | Newcastle |
| | | Report | van Egmond 25'; Seal 50'; Markovski 87' | Stadium: Austral Park; Attendance: 1,024; Referee: Peter Spiers |

== Second round ==
Adelaide City had a bye for the Second round.

| 4 December 1991 | Melbourne Croatia | 3–1 | Preston Makedonia | Melbourne |
| | Mori 61'; Milosevic 70'; Silic 90+2' | Report | Waddell 90' | Stadium: Olympic Park; Attendance: 980; Referee: Dennis Voutsinis |

| 4 December 1991 | Sydney Croatia | 0–2 | Marconi Fairfield | Sydney |
| | | Report | Harper 69'; Lowe 82' | Stadium: Croatian Sports Centre; Attendance: 1,115; Referee: Gary Power |

| 4 December 1991 | Wollongong City | 0–1 | Brisbane United | Wollongong |
| | | Report | Brown 16' | Stadium: Brandon Park; Attendance: 468; Referee: John McConnell |

== Semi-finals ==
| 11 March 1992 | Marconi Fairfield | 4–1 | Brisbane United | Sydney |
| | Seal 44', 67'; de Marigny 60'; Johnson 62' | Report | Slater 30' | Stadium: Marconi Stadium; Attendance: 1,018; Referee: Eugene Brazzale |

| 11 March 1992 | Melbourne Croatia | 0–1 | Adelaide City | Melbourne |
| | | Report | Tapai 85' | Stadium: Olympic Park; Attendance: 662; Referee: Peter Spiers |

== Final ==
5 April 1992

| Adelaide City | 2–1 | Marconi Fairfield |
|---|---|---|
| Mullen 7'; Vidmar 81' | Report | Jones 74' |

Hindmarsh Stadium, Adelaide
Attendance: 3,102
Referee: Gordon Dunster
