= 1982 NSL Cup final =

- Event: 1982 NSL Cup
Heidelberg United	APIA Leichhardt
1	2
- Date: 12 September 1982
- Venue: Olympic Park, Melbourne
- Referee: Don Campbell
- Attendance: 5,000

The 1982 NSL Cup final was the final match of the 1982 NSL Cup, the sixth season of the National Soccer League Cup. It was played at Olympic Park in Melbourne on 12 September 1982 between Heidelberg United and APIA Leichhardt. APIA Leichhardt won the match 2–1 for their first NSL Cup title.

== Route to the final ==
Heidelberg United		Round	APIA Leichhardt	
Opposition	Score	Round	Opposition	Score
South Melbourne (A)	0–0 (a.e.t.) (5–4 p)	1st	Sydney Olympic (H)	5–3
Preston Makedonia (H)	1–0	QF	Marconi Fairfield (A)	2–1
Canberra City (H)	3–1	SF	Brisbane Lions (H)	2–0
Key: (H) = Home venue; (A) = Away venue

== Match ==
=== Details ===
12 September 1982
15:00 AEST

Heidelberg United	1–2	APIA Leichhardt
Campbell 63'	Report	McBreen 79'; Butler 85'

Olympic Park, Melbourne
Attendance: 5,000
Referee: Don Campbell

GK	1	(Australia) Jeff Olver
DF	2	(Scotland) Arthur McMillan
DF	10	(Australia) Charlie Yankos
DF	5	(England) Don MacLeod		(substituted off) 35'
DF	3	(Australia) Jim Tansey	Yellow card
MF	7	(Australia) Theo Selemidis
MF	15	(Australia) Ken Taylor
MF	8	(Australia) Jim Campbell
MF	—	(Australia) Mike Valentine
FW	16	(Australia) Gary Cole
FW	9	(Australia) Jamie Paton
Substitutes:
MF	—	(Australia) Chris Bekiaris		(substituted on) 35'
Head Coach:
(Australia) Len McKendry

GK	(Australia) Bob Parks
DF	(Australia) Paul Carter
DF	(Australia) Peter Wilson
DF	(Australia) Mark Pullen
DF	(Australia) Col McAusland
MF	(Australia) Jim McBreen	Yellow card
MF	(Australia) Terry Butler
MF	(Australia) Peter Jones
FW	(Scotland) John Bradley
FW	(Australia) Marshall Soper		(substituted off) 64'
FW	(Australia) Sebastian Giampaolo
Substitutes:
FW	(Australia) Bernie Godzik
Head Coach:
(Australia) Peter Jasksa

Match rules

- 90 minutes
- 30 minutes of extra time if necessary
