= 1980 NSL Cup final =

- Event: 1980 NSL Cup
Heidelberg United	Marconi Fairfield
- Heidelberg United won after a replay

Final
Heidelberg United	Marconi Fairfield
0	0
- After extra time
- Date: 4 October 1980
- Venue: Olympic Park Stadium, Melbourne
- Referee: Jack Johnston
- Attendance: 6,388

Replay
Heidelberg United	Marconi Fairfield
0	3
- Date: 15 October 1980
- Venue: Marconi Oval, Sydney
- Referee: Jack Johnston
- Attendance: 5,179

The 1980 NSL Cup final was the final match of the 1980 NSL Cup, the fourth season of the National Soccer League Cup. It was first played at Olympic Park Stadium in Melbourne on 4 October 1980 between Heidelberg United and Marconi Fairfield, before it was replayed in Marconi Oval in Sydney on 15 October 1980.

Marconi Fairfield won the replay match 3–0 after a 0–0 draw in the initial match for their first NSL Cup title. As winners of the NSL Cup, Marconi Fairfield qualified for the 1981 Charity Shield, which they won against National Soccer League champions Sydney City.

== Route to the final ==
Heidelberg United		Round	Marconi Fairfield	
Opposition	Score	Round	Opposition	Score
Essendon Croatia (H)	2–0	1st	Melita Eagles (H)	3–0
South Melbourne (H)	2–1	2nd	Newcastle KB United (A)	3–1
Canberra City (A)	2–0	QF	St George-Budapest (H)	4–0
Adelaide City (H)	0–0 (a.e.t.) (3–1 p)	SF	Brisbane Lions (H)	1–0
Key: (H) = Home venue; (A) = Away venue

== Match ==
=== Details ===
==== Final ====
4 October 1980

Heidelberg United	0–0 (a.e.t.)	Marconi Fairfield
	Report

Olympic Park, Melbourne
Attendance: 6,388
Referee: Jack Johnston

GK	1	(Australia) Jeff Olver
DF	2	(Scotland) Arthur McMillan
DF	14	(Scotland) Bob Provan
DF	5	(Scotland) Pat Bannon
DF	3	(Australia) Jim Tansey
MF	7	(Australia) Theo Selemidis
MF	8	(Australia) Jim Campbell	(substituted off) 100'
MF	6	(Australia) Jimmy Rooney
MF	11	(Australia) Andy Bozikas	(substituted off) 112'
FW	16	(Australia) Gary Cole
FW	9	(Australia) Jamie Paton
Substitutes:
MF	15	(Australia) Ken Taylor	(substituted on) 112'
MF	17	(England) Jim WIlliams	(substituted on) 100'
Head Coach:
(Australia) Len McKendry

GK	1	(Australia) Allan Maher
DF	5	(Australia) Ivo Prskalo
DF	13	(Australia) Jim Muir
DF	4	(Australia) Tony Henderson
DF	2	(Australia) Peter Brogan	(substituted off) 64'
MF	18	(Australia) Jimmy Cant
MF	6	(Australia) Gary Byrne
MF	7	(Australia) Peter Raskopoulos
FW	11	(Australia) Peter Sharne
FW	14	(Australia) Mark Jankovics
FW	9	(Australia) Eddie Krncevic
Substitutes:
FW	15	(Australia) Ken Lindsay	(substituted on) 64'
Head Coach:
(Australia) Les Scheinflug

Match rules

- 90 minutes
- 30 minutes of extra time if necessary

==== Replay ====
15 October 1980
19:30 AEDT

Marconi Fairfield	3–0	Heidelberg United
Byrne 17' (pen.); Krncevic 64'; Sharne 87'	Report

Marconi Oval, Sydney
Attendance: 5,179
Referee: Jack Johnston

GK	1	(Australia) Allan Maher
DF	5	(Australia) Ivo Prskalo
DF	13	(Australia) Jim Muir	Yellow card
DF	4	(Australia) Tony Henderson
DF	2	(Australia) Peter Brogan
MF	18	(Australia) Jimmy Cant
MF	6	(Australia) Gary Byrne
MF	7	(Australia) Peter Raskopoulos
FW	11	(Australia) Peter Sharne
FW	14	(Australia) Mark Jankovics
FW	9	(Australia) Eddie Krncevic
Head Coach:
(Australia) Len Scheinflug

GK	1	(Australia) Jeff Olver
DF	2	(Scotland) Arthur McMillan
DF	3	(Australia) Jim Tansey
DF	4	(Australia) John Yzendoorn
DF	5	(Scotland) Pat Bannon	Yellow card
DF	14	(Scotland) Bob Provan	Yellow card
MF	6	(Australia) Jimmy Rooney
MF	7	(Australia) Theo Selemidis
MF	8	(Australia) Jim Campbell
FW	16	(Australia) Gary Cole
FW	9	(Australia) Jamie Paton
Head Coach:
(Australia) Len McKendry

Match rules

- 90 minutes
- 30 minutes of extra time if necessary
