= Jimmy Cant =

Australian soccer player (born 1953)

Jim Cant
Personal information
- Date of birth: 24 September 1953 (age 73)
- Place of birth: Edinburgh, Scotland
- Position: Midfielder

Youth career
- Peebles Rovers

Senior career*
Years	Team	Apps	(Gls)
1970–1977	Heart of Midlothian	66	(4)
1977–1979	Canberra City	67	(1)
1980	Marconi-Fairfield	14	(0)
1981–1985	Sydney City	126	(3)
1986	Canberra City	19	(0)

International career
1983	Australia	6	(1)
- * Club domestic league appearances and goals

Jim Cant (born 24 September 1953) is a former soccer player who played in the Scottish and Australian national leagues. Born in Scotland, he played at international level for Australia.

== Playing career ==
=== Club career ===
Cant signed for Hearts Of Midlothian in 1970, from United Crossroads Boys Club, he was farmed out by Heart of Midlothian to play one season of amateur football for Peebles Rovers for one season, then brought back to Tynecastle to play reserve football, making his first team debut in 1972. Heart of Midlothian. He played 66 league matches for Hearts. Jimmy requested a free transfer late 1976 and eventually got his wish Xmas 1977. Johnny Warren got in touch with Jimmy through Sydney City's coach Gerry Chaldi, Jimmy was mentioned to Gerry Chaldi by Hakoah player John Stevenson, who had played with Jimmy at Hearts. Jimmy accepted an offer from Johnny Warren, coach for Canberra City 1977, to come to Australia on a 1-year contract. Jimmy eventually played for Canberra City, Marconi FC and Sydney City and his final playing year 1987, Canberra City for a second spell in the National Soccer League.

=== International career ===
In 1983 Cant made his debut for his adopted country. He played 12 matches for Australia, including six in full international matches.

== Honours ==
Marconi Fairfield

- NSL Cup: 1980

Sydney City

- National Soccer League: 1981, 1982

Australia

- Merlion Cup: 1983
