= 1995 National Soccer League grand final =

1995 National Soccer League Grand Final
- Event: 1994–95 National Soccer League
Adelaide City	Melbourne Knights
0	2
- Date: 7 May 1995
- Venue: Hindmarsh Stadium, Adelaide
- Man of the Match: Steve Horvat (Joe Marston Medal)
- Referee: Eddie Lennie
- Attendance: 16,000

The 1995 National Soccer League Grand Final was the championship match of the 1994–95 National Soccer League season and was played between Adelaide City and Melbourne Knights at Hindmarsh Stadium on 7 May 1995.

== Road to the final ==
=== Adelaide City ===
Adelaide City entered the final series having finished second in the league to the Melbourne Knights. In the major semi-final, they won both legs with an aggregate score of 3–1, qualifying for the grand final ahead of the minor premiers.

=== Melbourne Knights ===
The Knights finished the NSL season as minor premiers. After losing the major semi-final to Adelaide City, the Knights followed up with a narrow 3–2 preliminary final victory over South Melbourne, who had finished sixth in the league.

== Match ==
=== First half ===
Melbourne Knights opened the scoring with defender Andrew Marth scoring a goal from outside the penalty box after 36 minutes. Joe Spiteri followed up with a second five minutes later.

=== Second half ===
Brad Hassell had a shot hit the crossbar in the 76th minute which was Adelaide City's best chance.

=== Details ===
7 May 1995

Adelaide City	0–2	Melbourne Knights
	Reports	Andrew Marth 36'; Joe Spiteri 41'

Hindmarsh Stadium, Adelaide
Attendance: over 16,000
Referee: Eddie Lennie

Assistant referees:
Fourth official:

Match rules

- 90 minutes.
- 30 minutes of extra time if necessary.
- Penalty shoot-out if scores still level.

== Post-match ==
The championship was the Knights' first win after having lost three grand finals since 1991.

Melbourne Knights defender Steve Horvat was awarded the Joe Marston Medal for best player in the grand final.
