= 1986 NSL Cup final =

- Event: 1986 NSL Cup
Adelaide Hellas	Sydney City
2	3
- Date: 17 September 1986
- Venue: Hindmarsh Stadium, Adelaide
- Referee: Stewart Mellings
- Attendance: 3,200

The 1986 NSL Cup final was the final match of the 1986 NSL Cup, the tenth season of the National Soccer League Cup. It was played at Hindmarsh Stadium in Adelaide on 17 September 1986 between Adelaide Hellas and Sydney City.

Sydney City won the match 3–2 for their first NSL Cup title. As winners Sydney City qualified for the Oceania Cup Winners' Cup.

== Route to the final ==
Adelaide Hellas		Round	Sydney City	
Opposition	Score	Round	Opposition	Score
Salisbury United (H)	3–0	R1	Sydney Croatia (A)	3–0
Adelaide City (H)	1–0	R2	Newcastle Rosebud United (H)	2–0
Croydon City (H)	2–1	QF	Brisbane City (A)	3–1
Canberra City (H)	3–1 (a.e.t.)	SF	Heidelberg United (A)	1–1 (a.e.t.) (4–3 p)
Key: (H) = Home venue; (A) = Away venue

== Match ==
=== Details ===
17 September 1986
20:00 ACST

Adelaide Hellas	2–3 (a.e.t.)	Sydney City
Hristodoulou 49', 112'	Report	Kosmina 61'; Farina 114', 118'

Hindmarsh Stadium, Adelaide
Attendance: 3,200
Referee: Stewart Mellings

GK		(Australia) Gary Sproul
DF	4	(Australia) Robbie Dunn
DF	5	(Australia) Brenton Hiern
DF	10	(Australia) Chris Manou
MF	11	(Australia) Alan Scott
MF	7	(Australia) Lou Hristodoulou
MF	13	(Australia) John Panagis
MF		(Australia) Steve Atsalas
MF	14	(Australia) George Papadopoulos	(substituted off) 120'
FW	6	(Scotland) Graham Honeyman
FW	8	(Australia) George Konstandopoulos
Substitutes:
MF		(Australia) George Haniotis	(substituted on) 120'
Head Coach:
(Australia) Edmund Kreft

GK	1	(Australia) Brett Hughes
MF	2	(Australia) Ean Rodrigues	(substituted off) 37'
DF	3	(Australia) Alex Robertson
DF		(Australia) Robbie Hooker
DF	5	(Australia) Jean-Paul de Marigny
MF	12	(Australia) Ian Souness
MF	11	(Australia) Grant Lee
MF	6	(Australia) Murray Barnes	(substituted off) 88'
FW	9	(Australia) Frank Farina
FW	10	(Australia) John Kosmina
Substitutes:
FW		(Australia) Abbas Saad	(substituted on) 37'
FW		(Australia) Andy Harper	(substituted on) 88'
Head Coach:
(Scotland) Eddie Thomson

Match rules

- 90 minutes
- 30 minutes of extra time if necessary
- Penalty shoot-out if scores still level
