= 1978 NSL Cup final =

Australian soccer tournament final

- Event: 1978 NSL Cup
Brisbane City	Adelaide City
2	1
- Date: 8 October 1977
- Venue: Perry Park, Brisbane
- Attendance: 6,964

The 1978 NSL Cup final was the second NSL Cup Final, the final match of the 1978 NSL Cup. It was played at Perry Park in Brisbane, Australia, on 8 October 1978, contested by Brisbane City and Adelaide City. Brisbane won the match 2–1.

== Background ==
Brisbane City entered the second NSL Cup Final having won the inaugural cup on penalties. In 1977, Adelaide had been eliminated by local rival and eventual losing semi-finalist West Adelaide.

A draw was held the week before the final to decide the venue, with Perry Park hosting for the second year in a row.

== Route to the final ==
=== Brisbane City ===
Round	Opposition	Score
1st	St George-Budapest (A)	1–0
R16	Brisbane Lions (H)	1–0 (a.e.t.)
QF	Sydney City (A)	3–1
SF	Newcastle KB United (H)	2–0
Key: (H) = Home venue; (A) = Away venue

=== Adelaide City ===
Round	Opposition	Score
1st	Noarlunga United	5–0
R16	West Adelaide	2–1
QF	Essendon Croatia	3–0
SF	Canberra City	3–1
Key: (H) = Home venue; (A) = Away venue

== Match ==
A Barry Kelso strike saw the Brisbane team take the lead in the 28th minute. Adelaide City soon equalised, with Zoran Matić scoring in the 31st minute. Frank Pimblett sealed the win for Brisbane City in the 77th minute.

=== Details ===
8 October 1978

Brisbane City	2–1	Adelaide City
Kelso 28'; Pimblett 77'	Report	Zoran Matić 31'

Perry Park, Brisbane
Attendance: 4,964
Referee: Tony Boskovic
