= 1992 NSL Cup final =

- Event: 1991–92 NSL Cup
Adelaide City	Marconi Fairfield
2	1
- Date: 5 April 1992
- Venue: Hindmarsh Stadium, Adelaide
- Referee: Gordon Dunster
- Attendance: 3,102

The 1992 NSL Cup final was the final match of the 1991–92 NSL Cup, the 16th season of the National Soccer League Cup. It was played at Hindmarsh Stadium in Adelaide on 5 April 1992 between Adelaide City and Marconi Fairfield. Adelaide City won the match 2–1 for their third NSL Cup title.

== Route to the final ==
Adelaide City		Round	Marconi Fairfield	
Opposition	Score	Round	Opposition	Score
West Adelaide (H)	1–0	R1	Newcastle Breakers (A)	3–0
Bye		R2	Sydney Croatia (A)	2–0
Melbourne Croatia (A)	1–0	SF	Brisbane United (H)	4–1
Key: (H) = Home venue; (A) = Away venue

== Match ==
=== Details ===
5 April 1992

Adelaide City	2–1	Marconi Fairfield
Mullen 7'; Vidmar 81'	Report	Jones 74'

Hindmarsh Stadium, Adelaide
Attendance: 3,102
Referee: Gordon Dunster

GK	(Australia) Robert Zabica
DF	(Australia) Paul Shillabeer
DF	(Australia) Tony Vidmar
DF	(Australia) Milan Ivanović
DF	(Australia) Alex Tobin
MF	(Australia) Carlo Talladira
MF	(Australia) Ernie Tapai
MF	(Australia) Ross Aloisi
FW	(Australia) Carl Veart
FW	(Australia) Joe Mullen
FW	(Australia) Steve Maxwell
Substitutes:
FW	(Australia) Joseph Barbaro
Head Coach:
(Socialist Federal Republic of Yugoslavia) Zoran Matić

GK
DF
DF
DF
DF
DF
MF
MF
FW
FW
FW
Substitutes:
FW
Head Coach:
(Australia) Berti Mariani

(Australia) Mark Schwarzer
(Australia) Gary van Egmond	Booked
(Australia) Jean-Paul de Marigny
(Australia) Mark Jones
(Australia) Steve Georgakis
(Australia) Tom McCulloch
(Australia) Ian Gray	Booked
(Australia) David Lowe
(Australia) Andy Harper
(Australia) David Seal
(Australia) Glen Johnson	(substituted off) 46'
(Australia) John Markovski	(substituted on) 46'

Match rules

- 90 minutes
- 30 minutes of extra time if necessary
- Penalty shoot-out if scores still level
