= Robbie Dunn =

Australian former soccer player

Personal information
- Full name: Robert Dunn
- Date of birth: 6 July 1960 (age 66)
- Place of birth: Paisley, Scotland
- Position: Defender

Youth career
- Kwinana United
- Rockingham City

Senior career*
Years	Team	Apps	(Gls)
1980	North Perth Croatia		
1981	Adelaide Azzurri		
1982–1983	West Adelaide	58	(7)
1984–1985	Preston Makedonia	52	(7)
1986	West Adelaide	19	(4)
1987–1988	Melbourne Croatia	38	(2)
1989–1990	Perth Italia		
1991	South China		
1992	Selangor		
1992–1994	North Perth Croatia		
1995	Cockburn City		
1995	Mitchelton		
1996	Melville Corinthians		
Total		167	(20)

International career
1985	Australia B	2	(0)
1985–1988	Australia	25	(2)

Managerial career
- 1993: North Perth Croatia
- 2008–2011: Western Australia
- 2012–2013: Western Knights
- * Club domestic league appearances and goals

Robert Dunn (born 6 July 1960) is an Australian former soccer player. Dunn played as a defender in a career that spanned 15 years.

== Playing career ==
=== Club career ===
Dunn played in the National Soccer League for Preston Makedonia, West Adelaide and Melbourne Croatia.

=== State career ===
Dunn represented the Western Australian state team once against Millwall in 1989.

=== International career ===
Dunn represented Australia 36 times including 25 full international matches.

== Coaching career ==
Dunn was a playing coach at North Perth Croatia in 1993.

At the start of the 2007 A-League season he was employed on a part-time basis by Perth Glory to assist David Mitchell in coaching duties. Due to business commitments he was unable to pursue a full-time coaching career.

He was appointed coach of the Western Australian state team in 2008 and has coached the team in three matches.

== Post-football ==
He currently lives in Perth. He was an expert commentator on 990 Information Radio's coverage of Perth Glory A-League games. Dunn is a regularly interviewed through a variety of media outlets for advice and updates on Australia and international games.

Dunn still plays in the Masters League Soccer in Western Australia competes in International Masters Tournaments and was the Senior Coach of Western Knights until 2013.

== Honours ==
Melbourne Croatia

- Victoria Buffalo Cup: 1987

Preston Makedonia

- NSL Cup runner-up: 1985
- NSL Southern Final runner-up 1985

Perth Italia

- NPL WA Grand Final: 1989, 1990

Australia

- Trans-Tasman Cup: 1986
- China–Australia Ampol Cup: 1986
- Bicentenary Gold Cup runner-up: 1988

Western Australia state

- Stratco Cup: 2008

Individual

- Football Australia Hall of Fame: 2001
- Football Hall of Fame Western Australia:
  - Hall of Champions: 2002
  - Hall of Legends: 2005
