= 1984 NSL Cup final =

- Event: 1984 NSL Cup
Melbourne Croatia	Newcastle Rosebud United
0	1
- Date: 12 September 1984
- Venue: Olympic Park, Melbourne
- Referee: Stewart Mellings
- Attendance: 4,000

The 1984 NSL Cup final was the final match of the 1984 NSL Cup, the eighth season of the National Soccer League Cup. It was played at Olympic Park in Melbourne on 12 September 1984 between Melbourne Knights and Newcastle Rosebud United. Newcastle won the match 1–0 for their first NSL Cup title.

== Route to the final ==
Melbourne Croatia		Round	Newcastle Rosebud United	
Opposition	Score	Round	Opposition	Score
Brisbane Lions (H)	2–1 (a.e.t.)	QF	Sydney City	3–0
APIA Leichhardt (A)	2–0	SF	Footscray JUST (A)	1–0
Key: (H) = Home venue; (A) = Away venue

== Match ==
=== Details ===
12 September 1984

Melbourne Knights	0–1	Newcastle Rosebud United
	Report	Todd 29'

Olympic Park, Melbourne
Attendance: 4,000
Referee: Stewart Mellings

GK	23	(Australia) Yakka Banovic
DF	2	(Australia) Tony Curcio
DF	3	(Australia) Shaun Parton
DF	5	(Australia) George Hannah
MF	—	(Australia) Theo Selemidis
MF	12	(Socialist Federal Republic of Yugoslavia) Drago Deankovic	(substituted off) 86'
MF	8	(Socialist Federal Republic of Yugoslavia) Josip Biskic
MF	6	(Socialist Federal Republic of Yugoslavia) Jozo Antolovic	(substituted off) 46'
MF	14	(Australia) Robert Markovac
FW	10	(Australia) David Brogan
FW	11	(Australia) Tommy Cumming
Substitutes:
DF	13	(Scotland) Peter Lewis	(substituted on) 86'
MF	15	(Australia) Jim Campbell	(substituted on) 46'
Head Coach:
(Australia) Tony Vrzina

GK	1	(Australia) Clint Gosling
DF	4	(Australia) Neil Owens
DF	2	(Australia) Ralph Maier
DF	3	(Australia) Michael Boogaard	Yellow card
DF	5	(Australia) Andrew Thompson
MF	6	(Australia) John McQuarrie
MF	7	(Australia) Joe Senkalski
MF	9	(Australia) Dean Milosevic		(substituted off) 83'
FW	8	(Australia) Simon Brandt
FW	11	(England) Derek Todd
FW	10	(Australia) David Jones
Substitutes:
MF	12	(Australia) Steve Allen		(substituted on) 83'
Head Coach:
(Australia) Willie Gallagher

Match rules

- 90 minutes
- 30 minutes of extra time if necessary
- Penalty shoot-out if scores still level
