= 1981 NSL Cup final =

- Event: 1981 NSL Cup
| Brisbane Lions | West Adelaide |
| 3 | 1 |
- Date: 20 September 1981
- Venue: Bruce Stadium, Canberra
- Referee: Chris Bambridge
- Attendance: 6,132

The 1981 NSL Cup final was the final match of the 1981 NSL Cup, the fifth season of the National Soccer League Cup. It was played at Bruce Stadium in Canberra on 20 September 1981 between Brisbane Lions and West Adelaide.

Brisbane Lions won the match 3–1 for their first NSL Cup title. As winners, Brisbane Lions qualified for the 1982 Charity Shield, which they lost to National Soccer League champions Sydney City.

It was decided that the final would be hosted in Canberra as part of a gala weekend featuring annual press awards.

== Route to the final ==
| Brisbane Lions | | Round | West Adelaide | |
| Opposition | Score | Round | Opposition | Score |
|---|---|---|---|---|
| Townsville United (A) | 3–0 | 1st | Para Hills (H) | 3–0 |
| Grange Thistle (H) | 2–0 | 2nd | Cumberland United (H) | 3–1 |
| St Kilda Hakoah (H) | 1–0 | QF | Brisbane City (H) | 4–2 |
| Marconi Fairfield (A) | 3–2 | SF | Adelaide City (H) | 1–0 |
Key: (H) = Home venue; (A) = Away venue

== Match ==
=== Details ===
20 September 1981
15:00 AEST

| Brisbane Lions | 3–1 | West Adelaide |
|---|---|---|
| Daunt 4'; Ferris 75'; Williamson 87' (pen.) | Report | Topaz 82' |

Canberra Stadium, Canberra
Attendance: 6,132
Referee: Chris Bambridge

| GK | 20 | (England) Nigel Lowndes |
| DF | 5 | (Australia) Colin Bennett |
| DF | 6 | (Scotland) Jim Hermiston |
| DF | 3 | (Australia) Alan Niven |
| DF | 7 | (Australia) Steve Hogg |
| MF | 2 | (South Africa) Paul Ontong |
| MF | 8 | (Scotland) Jim McLean |
| FW | 9 | (Scotland) Bobby Ferris |
| FW | — | (Australia) Calvin Daunt | (substituted off) 75' |
| FW | 16 | (Australia) Craig Low |
| FW | — | (Scotland) Billy Williamson |
Substitutes:
| MF | 14 | (Australia) John Ogden | (substituted in) 75' |
Head Coach:
(Scotland) Joe Gilroy

| GK | 1 | (Australia) Martyn Crook |
| DF | 12 | (Socialist Federal Republic of Yugoslavia) Zoran Maricic |
| DF | 17 | (Scotland) Ian McKie |
| DF | 5 | (Israel) Shraga Topaz |
| MF | — | (Australia) Tom Forde |
| MF | 11 | (Scotland) Ian McGregor |
| FW | 10 | (Scotland) Graham Honeyman |
| FW | — | (Republic of Ireland) Vic Smythe |
| FW | 8 | (Angola) Lopez Manecas | (substituted off) 72' |
| FW | — | (Scotland) Jim Wright | (substituted off) 59' |
| FW | — | (Australia) Peter Kowalski |
Substitutes:
| DF | 15 | (Greece) Con Kambas | (substituted in) 59' |
| FW | — | (Australia) Aldo Lorenzoni | (substituted in) 72' |
Head Coach:
(Australia) Peter Jasksa

Assistant referees:
Don Campbell
Jack Johnston

Match rules

- 90 minutes
- 30 minutes of extra time if necessary
