= 1977 NSL Cup final =

- Event: 1977 NSL Cup
Brisbane City	Marconi-Fairfield
1	1
- Brisbane City win 5–3 on penalties
- Date: 9 October 1977
- Venue: Perry Park, Brisbane
- Attendance: 9,000

The 1977 NSL Cup final was the first NSL Cup Final, the final match of the 1977 NSL Cup. It was played at Perry Park in Brisbane, Australia, on 9 October 1977, contested by Brisbane City and Marconi-Fairfield.

== Route to the final ==
=== Brisbane City ===
Round	Opposition	Score
R16	Brisbane Lions (H)	3–2
QF	Western Suburbs (H)	2–1 (a.e.t.)
SF	West Adelaide (A)	3–2
Key: (H) = Home venue; (A) = Away venue;

=== Marconi-Fairfield ===
Round	Opposition	Score
R16	Sydney City (H)	1–0
QF	Canberra City (H)	2–1
SF	Fitzroy United (A)	3–2
Key: (H) = Home venue; (A) = Away venue;

== Match ==
=== Details ===
5 October 1977

Brisbane City	1–1 (a.e.t.)	Marconi
Tokesi 60'	Report	Sharne 40'
Penalties
	5–3

Perry Park, Brisbane
Attendance: 7,000
Referee: Stewart Mellings

GK	Osvaldo Borzi (ARG)
DF	Jim Hermiston (SCO)
DF	Ian Rathmell (SCO)
DF	Peter Tokesi (AUS)	Booked
MF	Roberto Echeverria (AUS)		(substituted off) 105'
MF	Larry Gaffney (AUS)
MF	Thomas McLeod (SCO)
MF	Frank Pimblett (ENG)
FW	Kevin Caldwell (AUS)	Booked	(substituted off) 95'
FW	Willie Conner (AUS)
FW	Ian Johnston (AUS)	Booked
Substitutes:
FW	John Coyne (AUS)		(substituted in) 95'
FW	Brian Kibbey (AUS)		(substituted in) 105'
