= 1991 NSL Cup final =

- Event: 1990–91 NSL Cup
| Melita Eagles | Preston Makedonia |
| 1 | 0 |
- Date: 7 April 1991
- Venue: Marconi Stadium, Sydney
- Referee: Tom McRoe
- Attendance: 6,749

The 1991 NSL Cup final was the final match of the 1990–91 NSL Cup, the 15th season of the National Soccer League Cup. It was played at Marconi Stadium in Sydney on 7 April 1991 between Melita Eagles and Preston Makedonia. Melita Eagles won the match 1–0 for their first NSL Cup title.

== Route to the final ==
| Melita Eagles | | Round | Preston Makedonia | |
| Opposition | Score | Round | Opposition | Score |
|---|---|---|---|---|
| Bye | | R1 | Bye | |
| Adelaide City (H) | 2–1 | R2 | Marconi Fairfield (A) | 1–0 |
| South Melbourne (A) | 3–1 | SF | APIA Leichhardt (H) | 2–1 |
Key: (H) = Home venue; (A) = Away venue

== Match ==
=== Details ===
7 April 1991

| Melita Eagles | 1–0 | Preston Makedonia |
|---|---|---|
| Brown 89' | Report |

Marconi Stadium, Sydney
Attendance: 6,749
Referee: Tom McRoe

| Melita Eagles | Preston Makedonia |

| GK | 1 | (Australia) Alex McPherson |
| RB | 2 | (Australia) Andrew Callanan |
| CB | 4 | (Australia) Alan Hunter | (substituted off) 46' |
| CB | 5 | (Uruguay) Washington González |
| LB | 3 | (Australia) Scott O'Donnell |
| RM | 7 | (Australia) Lenny Vial | (substituted off) 73' |
| CM | 8 | (Argentina) Hugo Gimenez |
| CM | 6 | (Australia) Gus Cerro |
| LM | 10 | (Australia) Aytek Genc |
| CF | 9 | (Australia) Marshall Soper |
| CF | 11 | (Australia) Greg Brown |
Substitutes:
| DF | | (Argentina) Alfredo Barrios | (substituted on) 46' |
| MF | | (Poland) Jarosław Nowicki | (substituted on) 73' |
Head Coach:
(Australia) Raul Blanco

| GK | 1 | (Australia) Phil Traianedes |
| RB | 2 | (Australia) Ian Roodhouse | Yellow card |
| CB | 5 | (Australia) Shaun Parton |
| CB | 4 | (Australia) Steve Jackson | Yellow card |
| LB | 3 | (Australia) George Jolevski |
| RM | 6 | (Australia) George Petrov |
| CM | 7 | (Socialist Federal Republic of Yugoslavia) Zoran Tasevski | Yellow card |
| CM | 10 | (Australia) Oscar Crino | Yellow card | (substituted off) 58' |
| LM | 11 | (Australia) Josip Markovac | Yellow card |
| CF | 8 | (Australia) Kris Trajanovski |
| CF | 9 | (Australia) Warren Spink | Yellow card |
Substitutes:
| MF | | (Australia) Robert Spasevski | | (substituted on) 58' |
Head Coach:
(Australia) John Gradiner

Match rules

- 90 minutes
- 30 minutes of extra time if necessary
- Penalty shoot-out if scores still level
