= Garry McDowall =

Scottish footballer

Personal information
- Date of birth: 6 March 1959 (age 67)
- Position: Midfielder

Senior career*
Years	Team	Apps	(Gls)
1974–1983	Hamilton Academical	208	(23)
1983–1984	Footscray JUST	40	(3)
1985–1987	South Melbourne	65	(5)
1988	Brunswick Juventus	23	(1)
1989–1991	Heidelberg United	25	(1)
Total		361	(33)

International career
1986–1988	Australia	16	(0)
- * Club domestic league appearances and goals

Garry McDowall (born 6 March 1959) is a former soccer player. Born in Scotland, he played as a midfielder in the Scottish Football League for Hamilton Academical before emigrating to Australia, playing in the National Soccer League (NSL) from 1983 until 1991 for Footscray JUST, South Melbourne, Brunswick Juventus and Heidelberg United. He played 25 times for Australia, including 16 times in full international matches.

== Honours ==
Heidelberg United

- NPL Victoria Championship: 1990

Australia

- Trans-Tasman Cup: 1986, 1988
- China–Australia Ampol Cup: 1986
