= 1979 NSL Cup final =

- Event: 1979 NSL Cup
Adelaide City	St George Budapest
3	2
- Date: 30 September 1979
- Venue: Olympic Sports Field, Adelaide
- Attendance: 9,554

The 1979 NSL Cup final was the final match of the 1979 NSL Cup. It was played at the Olympic Sports Field in Adelaide, Australia, on 30 September 1979, contested by Adelaide City and St George Budapest. Adelaide City won the match 3–2.

== Route to the final ==
=== Adelaide City ===
Round	Opposition	Score
1st	West Adelaide (H)	2–1
2nd	Preston Makedonia (A)	3–2
QF	Eastern Districts Azzurri (H)	4–0
SF	Canberra City (A)	1–0
Key: (H) = Home venue; (A) = Away venue.

=== St George Budapest ===
Round	Opposition	Score
1st	Ipswich United (H)	6–2
2nd	APIA Leichhardt (H)	3–2
QF	Brisbane City (A)	2–1
SF	Newcastle KB United (H)	1–0
Key: (H) = Home venue; (A) = Away venue.

== Match ==
=== Details ===
30 September 1979
14:30 ACDT

Adelaide City	3–2	St George Budapest
J. Nyskohous 54', 76'; B. Nyskohus 65'	Report	O'Connor 21'; O'Shea 48'

Olympic Sports Field, Adelaide
Attendance: 9,554

GK	(Australia) Peter Marshall
RB	(Scotland) Bobby Russell
CB	(Australia) Bogdan Nyskohus
CB	(Australia) John Perin
LB	(New Zealand) Glenn Dods
CM	(Australia) Charlie Villani
CM	(Australia) Agenor Muniz
CM	(Australia) Gary Marocchi
RW	(Australia) John Nyskohus
CF	(Australia) Brian Northcote
LW	(Australia) Chris Kent

GK	(Australia) Mike Fraser
RB	(Australia) George Harris
CB	(Australia) Doug Utjesenovic
CB	(Australia) Brendan Grosse
LB	(Australia) Robert O'Shea
RM	(Australia) Peter Katholos
CM	(Australia) Rudolfo Gnavi
LM	(Australia) John O'Shea
RF	(Australia) Phil O'Connor
CF	(England) Peter Hensman
LF	(England) Roy Cotton

Match rules

- 90 minutes
- 30 minutes of extra time if necessary
- Penalty shoot-out if scores still level
