= Peter Raskopoulos =

Australian soccer player

Personal information
- Full name: Peter Raskopoulos
- Date of birth: 22 February 1962 (age 64)
- Place of birth: Kastoria, Greece
- Position: Midfielder

Youth career
- Earlwood Wanderers

Senior career*
Years	Team	Apps	(Gls)
1977–1979	Sydney Olympic	37	(0)
1980	Marconi Stallions	29	(1)
1981–1989	Sydney Olympic	195	(21)
Total		261	(22)

International career
1980–1987	Australia	15	(0)

Managerial career
- 1993: Sydney Olympic
- 2000–2002: AC United
- * Club domestic league appearances and goals

Peter Raskopoulos (born 22 February 1962) is an Australian former association football player.

== Playing career ==
=== Club career ===
Raskopoulos played his youth football for Earlwood Wanderers before being signed for Sydney Olympic for the first season of the National Soccer League in 1977.

=== International career ===
Raskopoulos made his debut in a B-International for Australia at the 1980 OFC Nations Cup. He captained Australia in his full international debut for Australia in August 1981 against Indonesia in Jakarta. This made Peter the youngest ever Socceroos captain at only 19Y189D, a record that still holds. He played his last match for the Socceroos in 1987 having played 14 matches, captaining the team twice.

=== Career after football ===
Peter took up the role of C.E.O at Sydney Olympic, his beloved club in 2001. At the helm, they won the NSL championship in 2001–02 season and won the minor premiership the following season. Today Peter Raskopoulos is the owner of the Rasko Group; Rasko Linen Service, Goondee Aged Care, Rasko Exporters and Consultants and Exclusively O in Australia. He lives in Sydney with his wife and has four children, including comedians Jordan and Steen.
