= NSL Cup =

Australian soccer tournament

National Soccer League Cup
- Organiser(s): Football Federation Australia
- Founded: 1977; 49 years ago
- Abolished: 1997
- Region: Australia
- Most championships: Adelaide City (3 titles)

The National Soccer League Cup (known most commonly as the NSL Cup) was an annual knockout football competition in men's domestic Australian soccer organised by the Australian Soccer Federation between 1977 and 1997.

== History ==
The NSL Cup was organised to run in conjunction with the teams participating in the National Soccer League (NSL) between 1977 and 1997. It was the second nationwide club tournament held in Australia, the first being the Australia Cup during the 1960s. It was held initially in 1977 immediately after the end of the NSL's regular home and away season, as there was no final series. The 1978 edition expanded to include teams from various state leagues in Australia, including Annerley (Queensland), West Woden Juventus (ACT), Essendon Croatia (Victoria), Sydney Croatia (NSW) and Ascot (WA).

For the 1993–94 season the Cup was played in the preseason, before being played as a mid-season break for the 1995–96 season and then returning to the preseason for the 1996–97 season. The 1996-97 Cup was the final cup to be playing during the NSL years and saw a brand new club, Collingwood Warriors, defeat Marconi in the final. A replacement national knock-out cup was not instigated until the FFA Cup in 2014.

=== Upsets ===
State League side Sydney Croatia upset NSL club Marconi in the first round of the 1978 Cup. Other upsets over the years were state league teams defeated NSL teams, including Parramatta Melita Eagles defeating Marconi in 1979, Mt Gravatt defeating Brisbane City in 1980, and Croydon City defeating South Melbourne in 1986.

== Records and statistics ==
=== Final ===
==== Team ====
- Most wins: 3:
  - Adelaide City (1979, 1989, 1992)
- Most consecutive wins: 2:
  - Brisbane City (1977, 1978)
- Most appearances in a final: 5:
  - Heidelberg United (1980, 1982, 1983, 1993, 1995)
- Most Final appearances without ever winning: 2, joint record:
  - Preston Lions (1985, 1991)
  - West Adelaide (1981, 1986)
- Most Final appearances without ever losing: 2, joint record:
  - APIA Leichhardt (1982, 1988)
  - Brisbane City (1977, 1978)
- Longest gap between wins 17 years, Marconi Stallions (1980–1997)
- Biggest win 6 goals:
  - Melbourne Knights 6–0 Heidelberg United, (1995)
- Most goals in a final 6:
  - Melbourne Knights 6–0 Heidelberg United, (1995)
- Most goals by a losing side 2:
  - Sydney City 2–3 West Adelaide, (1986)
- Most defeats 4:
  - Heidelberg United (1980, 1982, 1983, 1995)

== Winners and finalists ==
=== Results by team ===
Results by team
Club	Wins	First final won	Last final won	Runners-up	Last final lost	Total final appearances
Adelaide City	3	1979	1992	1	1978	4
Parramatta Eagles	2	1991	1994	1	1993	3
Brisbane City	2	1977	1978	0	—	2
Sydney Olympic	2	1983	1985	2	—	4
APIA Leichhardt Tigers	2	1982	1988	0	—	2
South Melbourne	2	1990	1996	1	—	3
Heidelberg United	1	1993	1993	4	1995	5
Marconi-Fairfield	1	1980	1980	3	1997	4
Sydney United	1	1987	1987	1	1994	2
Melbourne Knights	1	1995	1995	1	1984	2
Brisbane Lions	1	1981	1981	0	—	1
Newcastle Rosebud United	1	1984	1984	0	—	1
Sydney City	1	1986	1986	0	—	1
Collingwood Warriors	1	1997	1997	0	—	1
West Adelaide	0	—	—	2	1986	2
Preston Lions	0	—	—	2	1991	2
St George	0	—	—	1	1979	1
Newcastle Breakers	0	—	—	1	1996	1
