= St George Stadium =

Soccer stadium in New South Wales, Australia

Barton Park
- Interactive map of Barton Park
- Former names: St George Stadium
- Location: Barton Park, Banksia, New South Wales 2216
- Coordinates: 33°56′50″S 151°9′18″E
- Owner: Bayside Council
- Operator: St George FC
- Capacity: 15,000
- Surface: 1978; Natural grass 2024; Artificial turf
- Field size: 120 m x 87 m

Construction
- Opened: March 1978
- Expanded: April 2024
- Demolished: February 2022

Tenants
- St George (1975–2006, 2009–2013, 2015–2017, 2024, 2025–present); St George FC Women (2018–2021, 2024, 2025–present)

Barton Park Sports Complex was a soccer stadium in Banksia, New South Wales, Australia.

== History ==
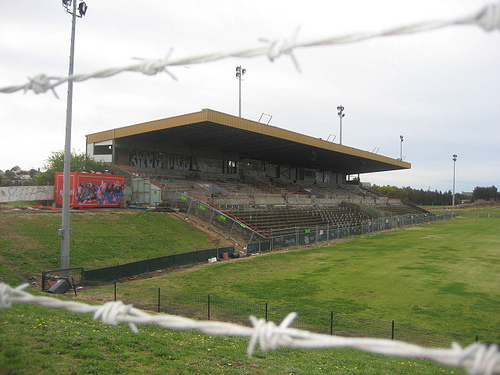
The former grandstand was in a state of disrepair

The original St George Soccer Stadium opened in March 1978, with St George playing against South Melbourne in the National Soccer League. The ground occupied a part of Barton Park, next to Muddy Creek, a tributary of the Cooks River in Banksia. Over time use of the stadium declined, resulting in it falling into disrepair.

In 2005, St George were controversially axed from the new look New South Wales Premier League, which the club tried to unsuccessfully overturn alongside Bonnyrigg White Eagles.

In 2006, the club departed the stadium in the grounds of it being unsuitable due to structural problems with the grandstand. During this time they played at various locations including the Belmore Sports Ground (an arena outside the St George district) and Kogarah Jubilee Oval.

Between 2007 and 2008, the ground was widely vandalised with graffiti and litter throughout the ground. Due to fears the grandstand would collapse, security fences were installed around the perimeter.

== Uses of the Stadium ==
In March 2009, the St George Saints decided that they would use St George Stadium for its home games from the 2009 New South Wales Super League season onwards. They used this stadium between 2009 and 2013 with occasional higher-level games played at Jubilee Oval.

In 2014, the stadium was used for community level games (games conducted between St George clubs) only, with the St George Saints using Jubilee Oval.

With the relegation of St George Saints to NPL2, they resumed using St George Stadium for games played in 2015.

Work to develop a sporting precinct at Barton Park began in 2023 and was completed in 2024.

In April 2024, St George FC announced that Bayside Council has been granted licence 1 of the new Barton Park Sports Complex to the club. This licence includes fields 1 and 2, the newly named Frank Arok Grandstand and the canteen facilities.
