= List of Newcastle KB United players =

Newcastle KB United, an association football club based in Newcastle, was founded in 1977. They were admitted into the National Soccer League for the 1978 season. They dissolved in 1984 and effectively left the 1984 National Soccer League after seven rounds and was replaced by Newcastle Rosebud United.

Craig Mason held the record for the greatest number of appearances for Newcastle KB United. The English midfielder played 152 times for the club. The club's goalscoring record was held by Ken Boden who scored 30 goals.

== Key ==
- The list is ordered first by date of debut, and then if necessary in alphabetical order.
- Appearances as a substitute are included.

Positions key
GK	Goalkeeper
DF	Defender
MF	Midfielder
FW	Forward

Nationality
Unless otherwise noted, the nationality of a player is determined by the country/countries which he has played for, or if said person has not played international football, their country of birth.
Club career
Club career is defined as the first and last calendar years in which the player appeared for the club in any of the competitions listed below.
Total appearances and Total goals
Total appearances and goals comprise those in the National Soccer League and NSL Cup.

== Players ==
List of Newcastle KB United players
Player	Nationality	Pos	Club career	Starts	Subs	Total	Goals
Player	Nationality	Pos	Club career	Appearances			Goals
Bill Amey	New Zealand	MF	1978	17	1	18	0
Ken Boden	Australia	MF	1978–1979	60	0	60	30
Slav Catalovski	Australia	—	1978	1	3	4	0
Colin Curran	Australia	DF	1978–1982	112	2	114	11
Phil Dando	New Zealand	GK	1978–1982	122	1	123	0
Roy Drinkwater	England	DF	1978–1982	135	0	135	21
Neil Endacott	Australia	MF	1978–1979; 1981–1982	35	2	47	2
Lloyd Hardes	Australia	MF	1978	14	2	16	0
Paul Kay	Australia	MF	1978	1	2	3	0
Craig Mason	England	MF	1978–1984	139	11	152	13
Bill Summerscales	England	DF	1978–1980	62	1	63	7
John Turnbull	Australia	MF	1978	1	0	1	0
Alan Vest	Australia	FW	1978	0	1	1	0
Peter Willis	Australia	MF	1978–1979	67	0	67	0
Mike Galpin	Australia	—	1978	25	2	27	4
Peter Tredinnick	Australia	MF	1978–1980	50	18	68	3
Craig Johnston	England	MF	1978; 1982	14	0	14	4
Bob Mountford	Australia	FW	1978; 1981; 1983	68	1	69	18
John Sneddon	Australia	DF	1978–1982	66	13	79	1
Joe Senkalski	Australia	MF	1978–1984	113	13	126	22
Bobby Charlton	England	FW	1978	1	0	1	0
Brett Cowburn	Australia	DF	1979–1980; 1983–1984	40	10	50	5
Keith Harris	Australia	—	1979	7	0	7	0
Graham Heys	England	FW	1979–1981	72	6	78	20
Malcolm McClelland	Australia	MF	1979–1982; 1984	71	11	82	9
Ian Seddon	England	MF	1979–1981	10	0	10	0
Jim McBreen	England	—	1979	2	5	7	0
Arno Bertogna	Australia	DF	1979–1981	57	0	57	2
Jim Preston	Scotland	GK	1979–1980	21	0	21	0
Kevin Keelan	Australia	FW	1979–1981	6	0	6	0
David Jones	England	FW	1979–1984	102	15	117	16
Paul Burrows	Australia	FW	1980–1981	12	5	17	2
Paul Reaney	England	DF	1980–1981	56	0	56	0
Mark Trenter	Wales	FW	1980	8	0	8	3
Dave Deakin	England	FW	1980	6	2	8	1
David Kamasz	England	FW	1980–1981	19	9	28	3
Craig Wallace	Australia	FW	1980	1	0	1	0
Howard Tredinnick	Australia	FW	1980–1983	81	1	82	4
Ian Buckley	England	MF	1981–1983	17	5	22	2
Steve Sumner	New Zealand	MF	1981	17	1	18	3
Alf Stamp	New Zealand	FW	1981–1982; 1984	15	19	34	4
Clint Gosling	New Zealand	GK	1981–1984	43	0	43	0
Grant Storey	Australia	—	1981	6	2	8	2
Mick Channon	England	FW	1981; 1983	10	0	10	3
Brett Gemmell	Australia	—	1982	9	0	9	1
Iain McGregor	Australia	—	1982	3	4	7	0
Trevor Smythe	Australia	MF	1982	10	1	11	0
Ralph Maier	Australia	DF	1982–1984	37	1	38	0
Gary Dooley	Malaysia	MF	1982–1984	8	1	9	0
David Lowe	Australia	MF	1982–1983	54	0	54	21
Andrew Thompson	Australia	DF	1982	2	0	2	0
Jim Hamilton	Australia	—	1982	15	0	15	3
Stuart Robertson	Scotland	MF	1982	10	0	10	0
Nigel Drysdale	Australia	FW	1982–1983	8	2	10	4
Bernard Kerby	Australia	MF	1982–1984	14	1	15	1
Peter Burke	Australia	DF	1983–1984	36	0	36	4
Gary Watson	England	DF	1983	31	0	31	0
Grant Lee	Australia	MF	1983	16	0	16	2
Simon Brandt	Australia	FW	1983–1984	11	2	13	6
Michael Boogaard	Australia	DF	1983–1984	13	2	15	1
Tony Caban	Australia	FW	1983–1984	4	0	4	1
Warren Haslem	Australia	—	1984	1	1	2	0
Peter Jones	Australia	—	1984	1	0	1	0
John McQuarrie	Australia	MF	1984	6	0	6	1
Peter Morgan	Australia	FW	1984	0	4	4	1
Robert Cox	Australia	GK	1984	2	0	2	0
Warren Davies	Australia	—	1984	2	0	2	0
Paul Gilligly	Australia	—	1984	1	0	1	0
Terry Mason	Australia	—	1984	1	0	1	0
Dean Milosevic	Australia	MF	1984	1	1	2	0
Neville Power	Australia	—	1984	1	0	1	0
Andy Stankovic	Australia	DF	1984	0	1	1	0
Derek Todd	England	—	1984	2	0	2	0
