= List of Newcastle KB United seasons =

Newcastle KB United was an Australian semi-professional association football club based in Newcastle. The club was formed in 1977 and joined the National Soccer League in the 1978 season until they were disbanded from the 1984 National Soccer League and became defunct as Adamstown Rosebud replaced the club for the remainder of the season. The club's first team spent seven seasons in the National Soccer League. The table details the club's achievements in major competitions, and the top scorers for each season.

== History ==
Newcastle KB United entered the National Soccer League in just its second edition in 1978 National Soccer League. The club finished 11th of 14 in its inaugural season along with finishing in the semi-finals of the NSL Cup. Newcastle KB United came closer to the Finals series spot the next season in 1979 finishing 6th, only a couple points off from the Finals series qualification while also reaching the NSL Cup semi-finals again. From this point onwards, attendance numbers started to fall at home games, while the club had also not been able to reach the Finals series for the next four seasons. The 1983 season which was the last full season played by the club saw their highest finish in the NSL regular season finishing 5th with no Finals series available. In the 1984 season, the club became defunct after playing seven rounds of the 1984 National Soccer League season, and had since then been replaced by another Newcastle club Newcastle Rosebud United for the remainder of the season.

== Key ==
Key to league competitions:

- National Soccer League (NSL) – Australia's former top football league, established in 1977 and dissolved in 2004.

Key to colours and symbols:

1st or W	Winners
2nd or RU	Runners-up
3rd	Third place
♦	Top scorer in division

Key to league record:

- Season = The year and article of the season
- Pos = Final position
- Pld = Matches played
- W = Matches won
- D = Matches drawn
- L = Matches lost
- GF = Goals scored
- GA = Goals against
- Pts = Points

== Seasons ==
Results of league and cup competitions by season
Season	Division	Pld	W	D	L	GF	GA	Pts	Pos	Finals	NSL Cup	Name(s)	Goals
Season	League									Finals	NSL Cup	Top goalscorer(s)	
1978	NSL	26	6	10	10	33	40	22	11th	DNQ	SF	Ken Boden	15 ♦
1979	NSL	26	11	9	6	43	30	32 (Note: A victory of 4 goals or more rewards an extra one point.)	6th	DNQ	SF	Ken Boden	15
1980	NSL	26	12	6	8	32	31	30	6th	DNQ	R2	Graham Heys	8
1981	NSL	30	11	8	11	41	41	30	10th	—	R1	Bob Mountford	8
1982	NSL	30	10	7	13	43	52	27	12th	DNQ	R1	David Lowe	11
1983	NSL	30	14	7	9	45	26	49	5th	—	R2	David Lowe	11
1984 (Note: After five rounds played in the 1984 National Soccer League, the club became defunct and was replaced by Newcastle Rosebud United for the remainder of the season.)	NSL	28	11	4	13	35	52	26	8th	DNQ	W	–	–
