= 1980 Newcastle KB United season =

Newcastle KB United
1980 season
- Manager: Alan Vest
- National Soccer League: 6th
- NSL Cup: Second round
- Top goalscorer: League: Graham Heys (8); All: Graham Heys (8)
- Highest home attendance: 9,147 vs. Sydney City (16 March 1980); National Soccer League
- Lowest home attendance: 4,429 vs. West Adelaide (14 June 1980); National Soccer League
- Average home league attendance: 6,402
- Biggest win: 3–0 (twice); 4–1
- Biggest defeat: 0–4 vs. Canberra City (H) (12 April 1980); National Soccer League; 0–4 vs. Heidelberg United (A) (25 May 1980); National Soccer League

The 1980 season was the third in the history of Newcastle KB United. It was also the third season in the National Soccer League. In addition to the domestic league, they also participated in the NSL Cup. Newcastle KB United finished 6th in their National Soccer League season, and were eliminated in the NSL Cup second round by Marconi Fairfield.

== Players ==
Note: Flags indicate national team as defined under FIFA eligibility rules; some limited exceptions apply. Players may hold more than one non-FIFA nationality.

No.	Pos.	Nation	Player
1	GK	NZL	Phil Dando
2	DF	ENG	Paul Reaney
3	DF	AUS	Neil Endacott
4	DF	AUS	Brett Cowburn
5	DF	ENG	Bill Summerscales
6	DF	ENG	Roy Drinkwater
7	DF	AUS	Arno Bertogna
8	FW	ENG	Dave Deakin
9	FW	WAL	Mark Trenter
10	FW	ENG	Graham Heys
11	FW	ENG	David Kamasz
12	MF	AUS	Joe Senkalski

No.	Pos.	Nation	Player
13	FW	ENG	David Jones
14	DF	AUS	John Sneddon
15	DF	AUS	Colin Curran
16	MF	AUS	Peter Tredinnick
17	FW	AUS	Howard Tredinnick
18	DF	AUS	Michael Boogaard
19	MF	AUS	Malcolm McClelland
20	GK	SCO	Jim Preston
21	FW	AUS	Richard Endacott
22	FW	AUS	Paul Burrows
23	MF	ENG	Craig Mason
—	FW	AUS	Craig Wallace

== Competitions ==
=== Overview ===
Competition	First match	Last match	Starting round	Final position	Record							
Competition	First match	Last match	Starting round	Final position	Pld	W	D	L	GF	GA	GD	Win %
National Soccer League	9 March 1980	28 September 1980	Matchday 1	6th	26	12	6	8	32	31	+1	46.15
NSL Cup	25 April 1980	5 July 1980	First round	Second round	2	1	0	1	4	3	+1	50.00
Total					28	13	6	9	36	34	+2	46.43

Last updated: complete
Source: Competitions

=== National Soccer League ===
==== League table ====
Pos	Team	Pld	W	D	L	GF	GA	GD	Pts	Qualification or relegation
1	Sydney City (C)	26	16	5	5	51	26	+25	37	Qualification to Finals series (Note: The Finals series was not considered the championship for the 1980 National Soccer League.)
2	Heidelberg United	26	15	6	5	55	33	+22	36	Qualification to Finals series
3	South Melbourne	26	15	5	6	42	21	+21	35	Qualification to Finals series
4	Marconi Fairfield	26	14	6	6	53	32	+21	34	Qualification to Finals series
5	Adelaide City	26	13	4	9	40	27	+13	30	
6	Newcastle KB United	26	12	6	8	32	31	+1	30	
7	Brisbane Lions	26	7	11	8	28	32	−4	25	
8	APIA Leichhardt	26	8	7	11	27	35	−8	23	
9	Footscray JUST	26	7	9	10	32	41	−9	23	
10	Canberra City	26	7	7	12	34	33	+1	21	
11	Blacktown City	26	9	3	14	34	55	−21	21	
12	Brisbane City	26	4	10	12	29	36	−7	18	
13	West Adelaide	26	7	3	16	24	46	−22	17	
14	St George-Budapest (R)	26	5	4	17	32	65	−33	14	Relegated to the 1981 NSW State League

Updated to match(es) played on unknown. Source: rsssf.com
Rules for classification: 1) points; 2) goal difference; 3) number of goals scored.
(C) Champions; (R) Relegated

==== Results by round ====
Round	1	2	3	4	5	6	7	8	9	10	11	12	13	14	15	16	17	18	19	20	21	22	23	24	25	26
Ground	A	H	A	H	A	H	A	H	A	H	H	A	H	A	H	A	H	H	A	H	A	H	A	A	H	A
Result	D	L	D	W	W	L	L	W	W	L	D	L	W	L	W	L	W	D	W	D	W	W	L	W	W	D
Position	5	14	13	6	5	9	9	8	8	8	8	8	8	9	9	9	9	9	9	8	6	5	5	5	5	6

Source: worldfootball.net
A = Away; H = Home; W = Win; D = Draw; L = Loss

==== Matches ====
9 March 1980 1	West Adelaide	1–1	Newcastle KB United	Adelaide
	Honeyman 89'	Report	Trenter 48'	Stadium: Hindmarsh Stadium; Attendance: 3,720; Referee: Barry Wilkinson

16 March 1980 2	Newcastle KB United	0–3	Sydney City	Newcastle
		Report	Boden 8'; Borges 22'; Barnes 46'	Stadium: Newcastle International Sports Centre; Attendance: 9,147; Referee: Jim Reeves

23 March 1980 3	Blacktown City	1–1	Newcastle KB United	Sydney
	Ortega 33'	Report	Jones 13'	Stadium: Gabbie Stadium; Attendance: 2,457; Referee: Doug Rennie

30 March 1980 4	Newcastle KB United	1–0	APIA Leichhardt	Newcastle
	Jones 39'	Report		Stadium: Newcastle International Sports Centre; Attendance: 7,517; Referee: Ken Allen

6 April 1980 5	Brisbane City	1–2	Newcastle KB United	Brisbane
	Kelso 16'	Report	Senkalski 80'; Kamasz 83'	Stadium: Perry Park; Attendance: 1,900; Referee: Tim Davies

12 April 1980 6	Newcastle KB United	0–4	Canberra City	Newcastle
		Report	Giampaolo 27', 68'; Maclaren 41'; Valeri (82)	Stadium: Newcastle International Sports Centre; Attendance: 7,052; Referee: Tony Boskovic

20 April 1980 7	Footscray JUST	2–1	Newcastle KB United	Footscray
	Lujic 35'; Vasic 80'	Report	Trenter 29'	Stadium: Western Oval; Attendance: 4,015; Referee: Chris Bambridge

27 April 1980 8	Newcastle KB United	3–1	Adelaide City	Newcastle
14:30 AEST	Marshall 18' (o.g.); Mason 38'; Deakin 65'	Report	Cowburn 85' (o.g.)	Stadium: Newcastle International Sports Centre; Attendance: 5,814; Referee: Dave Nugent

4 May 1980 9	St George-Budapest	0–3	Newcastle KB United	Sydney
		Report	Cowburn 17'; Heys 20'; P. Tredinnick 60'	Stadium: St George Stadium; Attendance: 2,429; Referee: Henry Witschge

10 May 1980 10	Newcastle KB United	0–1	Marconi Fairfield	Newcastle
		Report	Lindsay 40'	Stadium: Newcastle International Sports Centre; Attendance: 8,547; Referee: Des Miles

18 May 1980 11	Newcastle KB United	0–0	Brisbane Lions	Newcastle
		Report		Stadium: Newcastle International Sports Centre; Attendance: 7,486; Referee: Alf Rodway

25 May 1980 12	Heidelberg United	4–0	Newcastle KB United	Melbourne
	Campbell 30'; Bozikas 44'; Cole 73', 75'	Report		Stadium: Olympic Park; Attendance: 3,727; Referee: Stewart Mellings

8 June 1980 14	Sydney City	2–0	Newcastle KB United	Sydney
	Boden 67'; Mullen 81'	Report		Stadium: ES Marks Athletics Field; Attendance: 3,016; Referee: Peter Rampley

14 June 1980 15	Newcastle KB United	2–0	West Adelaide	Newcastle
	Burrows 53'; McClelland 89'	Report		Stadium: Newcastle International Sports Centre; Attendance: 4,429; Referee: Richard Lorenc

22 June 1980 16	APIA Leichhardt	1–0	Newcastle KB United	Sydney
	Summerscales 33' (o.g.)	Report		Stadium: Lambert Park; Attendance: 3,428; Referee: Henry Witschge

12 July 1980 17	Newcastle KB United	1–0	Blacktown City	Newcastle
	McClelland 75'	Report		Stadium: Newcastle International Sports Centre; Attendance: 4,603; Referee: Col Amos

19 July 1980 18	Newcastle KB United	1–1	Brisbane City	Newcastle
	Heys 14'	Report	Hamilton 32'	Stadium: Newcastle International Sports Centre; Attendance: 5,190; Referee: Doug Rennie

27 July 1980 19	Canberra City	1–2	Newcastle KB United	Canberra
	Byrne 67'	Report	Jones 26'; Senkalski 32'	Stadium: Bruce Stadium; Attendance: 4,095; Referee: Ken Allen

3 August 1980 13	Newcastle KB United	1–0	South Melbourne	Newcastle
	Curran 21'	Report		Stadium: Newcastle International Sports Centre; Attendance: 5,412; Referee: Jim Reeves

9 August 1980 20	Newcastle KB United	0–0	Footscray JUST	Newcastle
		Report		Stadium: Newcastle International Sports Centre; Attendance: 5,526; Referee: Tony Boskovic

17 August 1980 21	Adelaide City	1–3	Newcastle KB United	Adelaide
	Barnes 46'	Report	Jones 31'; Heys 58', 85'	Stadium: Olympic Sports Field; Attendance: 3,100; Referee: Bobby Kerr

23 August 1980 22	Newcastle KB United	2–1	St George-Budapest	Newcastle
	Jones 56'; Senkalski 74'	Report	Stone 70'	Stadium: Newcastle International Sports Centre; Attendance: 7,268; Referee: Jim Reeves

7 September 1980 23	Marconi Fairfield	4–1	Newcastle KB United	Sydney
	Byrne 20' (pen.), 60' (pen.), 74'; Krncevic 33'	Report	Drinkwater 16'	Stadium: Marconi Oval; Attendance: 4,121; Referee: Tim Davies

14 September 1980 24	Brisbane Lions	1–4	Newcastle KB United	Brisbane
	Ontong 64'	Report	Tredinnick 34'; McClelland 45'; Heys 53', 85'	Stadium: Lions Stadium; Attendance: 2,367; Referee: Peter Rampley

20 September 1980 25	Newcastle KB United	3–1	Heidelberg United	Newcastle
	Drinkwater 55' (pen.); Heys 81', 83'	Report	Paton 51'	Stadium: Newcastle International Sports Centre; Attendance: 5,242; Referee: Richard Lorenc

28 September 1980 26	South Melbourne	0–0	Newcastle KB United	Melbourne
		Report		Stadium: Middle Park; Attendance: 6,000; Referee: Peter Rampley

=== NSL Cup ===
25 April 1980 First round	Edgeworth Eagles	0–3	Newcastle KB United	Newcastle
		Report	Trenter 20'; Kamasz 80'; Drinkwater 90' (pen.)	Stadium: Jack McLaughlin Park; Attendance: 2,500; Referee: Jim Reeves

5 July 1980 Second round	Newcastle KB United	1–3	Marconi Fairfield	Newcastle
	Burrows 4'	Report	Raskopoulos 39', 50'; Brogan 21'	Stadium: Newcastle International Sports Centre; Attendance: 4,989; Referee: Chris Bambridge

== Statistics ==
=== Appearances and goals ===
Players with no appearances not included in the list.

No.	Pos.	Nat.	Name	National Soccer League		NSL Cup		Total	
No.	Pos.	Nat.	Name	Apps	Goals	Apps	Goals	Apps	Goals
1	GK	(New Zealand)	Phil Dando	16	0	2	0	18	0
2	DF	(England)	Paul Reaney	26	0	2	0	28	0
4	DF	(Australia)	Brett Cowburn	9(1)	1	1	0	11	1
5	DF	(England)	Bill Summerscales	7(1)	0	1	0	9	0
6	DF	(England)	Roy Drinkwater	26	2	2	1	28	3
7	DF	(Australia)	Arno Bertogna	23	0	1	0	24	0
8	FW	(England)	Dave Deakin	5(2)	1	1	0	8	1
9	FW	(Wales)	Mark Trenter	7	2	1	1	8	3
10	FW	(England)	Graham Heys	20(2)	8	1	0	23	8
11	FW	(England)	David Kamasz	5(4)	1	1	1	10	2
12	MF	(Australia)	Joe Senkalski	17(1)	3	1	0	19	3
13	FW	(England)	David Jones	24	5	1(1)	0	26	5
14	DF	(Australia)	John Sneddon	10(4)	0	0	0	14	0
15	DF	(Australia)	Colin Curran	23(1)	1	2	0	26	1
16	MF	(Australia)	Peter Tredinnick	18(3)	2	2	0	23	2
17	FW	(Australia)	Howard Tredinnick	0(1)	0	0	0	1	0
19	MF	(New Zealand)	Malcolm McClelland	9(4)	3	2	0	15	3
20	GK	(Scotland)	Jim Preston	10	0	0	0	10	0
22	FW	(Australia)	Paul Burrows	11(4)	1	1	1	16	2
23	MF	(England)	Craig Mason	19(3)	0	0(1)	0	23	1
—	FW	(Australia)	Craig Wallace	1	0	0	0	1	0

=== Clean sheets ===
Rank	No.	Pos	Nat	Name	National Soccer League	NSL Cup	Total
1	1	GK	(New Zealand)	Phil Dando	5	1	6
2	20	GK	(Scotland)	Jim Preston	3	0	3
Total					8	1	9
