= 1982 Newcastle KB United season =

Newcastle KB United
1982 season
- Manager: Ken Kaiser
- National Soccer League: 12th
- NSL Cup: First round
- Top goalscorer: League: David Lowe (9); All: David Lowe (11)
- Highest home attendance: 10,351 vs. Adelaide City (12 June 1982); National Soccer Leageue
- Lowest home attendance: 2,664 vs. Sydney City (24 July 1982); National Soccer League
- Average home league attendance: 4,333
- Biggest win: 4–1 vs. Sydney Olympic (A) (6 June 1982); National Soccer League
- Biggest defeat: 0–4 vs. Sydney City (A) (18 April 1982); National Soccer League

The 1982 season was the fifth in the history of Newcastle KB United. It was also the fifth season in the National Soccer League. In addition to the domestic league, they also participated in the NSL Cup. Newcastle KB United finished 12th in their National Soccer League season, and were eliminated in the NSL Cup first round by Marconi Fairfield.

== Players ==
Note: Flags indicate national team as defined under FIFA eligibility rules; some limited exceptions apply. Players may hold more than one non-FIFA nationality.

No.	Pos.	Nation	Player
1	GK	NZL	Phil Dando
2	DF	AUS	Neil Endacott
3	FW	AUS	Howard Tredinnick
4	MF	AUS	Joe Senkalski
5	MF	ENG	Craig Mason
6	DF	ENG	Roy Drinkwater
7		AUS	Brett Gemmell
8	MF	AUS	David Lowe
9	FW	ENG	David Jones
10	FW	NZL	Alf Stamp
11	MF	ENG	Ian Buckley
12	MF	AUS	Trevor Smythe
13		AUS	Iain McGregor

No.	Pos.	Nation	Player
14	MF	AUS	Malcolm McClelland
15	DF	AUS	Colin Curran
16	DF	AUS	John Sneddon
17		SCO	Stuart Robertson
18	MF	MAS	Gary Dooley
19	DF	AUS	Andy Stankovic
20	GK	NZL	Clint Gosling
—	FW	AUS	Nigel Drysdale
—		AUS	Jim Hermiston
—	MF	ENG	Craig Johnston
—	MF	AUS	Bernard Kerby
—	DF	AUS	Ralph Maier
—	DF	AUS	Andrew Thompson

== Competitions ==
=== Overview ===
Competition	First match	Last match	Starting round	Final position	Record							
Competition	First match	Last match	Starting round	Final position	Pld	W	D	L	GF	GA	GD	Win %
National Soccer League	14 February 1982	5 September 1982	Matchday 1	12th	30	10	7	13	43	52	−9	33.33
NSL Cup	14 June 1982		First round	First round	1	0	1	0	2	2	+0	0.00
Total					31	10	8	13	45	54	−9	32.26

Last updated: complete
Source: Competitions

=== National Soccer League ===
==== League table ====
Pos	Team	Pld	W	D	L	GF	GA	GD	Pts	Relegation
1	Sydney City (C)	30	20	5	5	68	28	+40	45	Qualification to Finals series (Note: The Finals series was not considered the championship for the 1982 National Soccer League.)
2	St George-Budapest	30	14	8	8	47	40	+7	36	Qualification to Finals series
3	Wollongong City	30	16	3	11	43	46	−3	35	Qualification to Finals series
4	Heidelberg United	30	13	8	9	42	37	+5	34	Qualification to Finals series
5	Preston Makedonia	30	12	10	8	45	41	+4	34	
6	South Melbourne	30	11	9	10	46	37	+9	31	
7	APIA Leichhardt	30	12	7	11	49	54	−5	31	
8	Sydney Olympic	30	12	6	12	52	42	+10	30	
9	West Adelaide	30	10	8	12	44	40	+4	28	
10	Marconi Fairfield	30	12	4	14	44	43	+1	28	
11	Brisbane Lions	30	10	8	12	39	42	−3	28	
12	Newcastle KB United	30	10	7	13	43	52	−9	27	
13	Adelaide City	30	6	12	12	36	44	−8	24	
14	Footscray JUST	30	5	14	11	34	46	−12	24	
15	Canberra City	30	7	10	13	37	54	−17	24	
16	Brisbane City	30	5	11	14	32	55	−23	21	

Source: rsssf.com
Rules for classification: 1) points; 2) goal difference; 3) number of goals scored.
(C) Champions

==== Results by round ====
Round	1	2	3	4	5	6	7	8	9	10	11	12	13	14	15	16	17	18	19	20	21	22	23	24	25	26	27	28	29	30
Ground	H	A	H	A	H	A	H	A	H	A	H	A	H	A	A	H	A	H	A	H	A	H	A	H	A	H	A	H	H	A
Result	L	L	L	D	W	L	D	L	D	L	L	L	D	L	W	D	W	W	L	W	W	L	L	D	W	W	D	W	W	L
Position	15	16	15	15	14	14	14	15	15	16	16	16	16	16	16	16	15	15	15	15	15	15	15	15	14	13	13	11	10	12

Source: worldfootball.net
A = Away; H = Home; W = Win; D = Draw; L = Loss

==== Matches ====
14 February 1982 1	Newcastle KB United	0–3	Sydney Olympic	Newcastle
		Report	Katholos 49'; Gavin 58'; Jennings 61'	Stadium: Newcastle International Sports Centre; Attendance: 5,335; Referee: Jim Reeves

21 February 1982 2	Heidelberg United	2–0	Newcastle KB United	Melbourne
	Cole 46'; Selemidis 68'	Report		Stadium: Olympic Park; Attendance: 3,000; Referee: Evan Venios

27 February 1982 3	Newcastle KB United	1–2	St George-Budapest	Newcastle
	Stamp 2'	Report	Barton 16'; Marton 56' (pen.)	Stadium: Newcastle International Sports Centre; Attendance: 3,050; Referee: Brian Fowler

7 March 1982 4	Adelaide City	2–2	Newcastle KB United	Adelaide
	J. Nyskohus 28'; Northcote 67'	Report	Jones 58', 76'	Stadium: Hindmarsh Stadium; Attendance: 3,200; Referee: Don Campbell

13 March 1982 5	Newcastle KB United	2–0	Marconi Fairfield	Newcastle
	Lowe 16', 77'	Report		Stadium: Newcastle International Sports Centre; Attendance: 2,920; Referee: Gary Power

21 March 1982 6	Brisbane Lions	4–1	Newcastle KB United	Brisbane
	Ferris 11'; Millman 71', 86'; Williamson 89'	Report	Lowe 42'	Stadium: Richlands Stadium; Attendance: 1,200; Referee: Alan Kibbler

27 March 1982 7	Newcastle KB United	1–1	Preston Makedonia	Newcastle
	McClelland 62'	Report	Brown 64'	Stadium: Newcastle International Sports Centre; Attendance: 2,965; Referee: Ken Small

4 April 1982 8	Wollongong City	1–0	Newcastle KB United	Wollongong
	O'Connor 35'	Report		Stadium: Wollongong Showground; Attendance: 3,890; Referee: Peter Rampley

10 April 1982 9	Newcastle KB United	2–2	South Melbourne	Newcastle
	Gemmell 54'; McClelland 78'	Report	Stevenson 75'; Egan 82'	Stadium: Newcastle International Sports Centre; Attendance: 3,700; Referee: Doug Rennie

18 April 1982 10	Sydney City	4–0	Newcastle KB United	Sydney
	Patikas 25', 72'; Murray 56'; Fletcher 78'	Report		Stadium: ES Marks Athletics Field; Attendance: 1,463; Referee: Tim Davies

24 April 1982 11	Newcastle KB United	1–2	West Adelaide	Newcastle
	Senkalski 5'	Report	Honeyman 2', 33'	Stadium: Newcastle International Sports Centre; Attendance: 3,046; Referee: Jim Reeves

2 May 1982 12	APIA Leichhardt	3–2	Newcastle KB United	Sydney
	Bradley 28'; Gray 33'; Giampaolo 85'	Report	Tredinnick 78'; Lowe 81'	Stadium: Lambert Park; Attendance: 3,000; Referee: Brian Fowler (Terry Seacy 57')

8 May 1982 13	Newcastle KB United	0–0	Brisbane City	Newcastle
		Report		Stadium: Newcastle International Sports Centre; Attendance: 2,983; Referee: Jim Reeves (Otto Scevak)

16 May 1982 14	Footscray JUST	3–1	Newcastle KB United	Melbourne
	Kojic 3', 85'; Ristovski 60'	Report	Mason 8'	Stadium: Schintler Reserve; Attendance: 2,000; Referee: Dennis Voutsinas

23 May 1982 15	Canberra City	1–3	Newcastle KB United	Canberra
	Purdie 21'	Report	Hamilton 34'; Senkalski 35'; McClelland ?'	Stadium: Bruce Stadium; Attendance: 2,000; Referee: Ken Allen

30 May 1982 16	Newcastle KB United	2–2	Heidelberg United	Newcastle
	Mason 38'; Lowe 78'	Report	Cole 67'; Campbell 76'	Stadium: Newcastle International Sports Centre; Attendance: 3,452; Referee: Doug Rennie

6 June 1982 17	Sydney Olympic	1–4	Newcastle KB United	Sydney
	Sneddon 40' (o.g.)	Report	Stamp 25'; Lowe 48'; Tredinnick 50'; Drinkwater 80'	Stadium: Pratten Park; Attendance: 6,120; Referee: Gary Power

12 June 1982 18	Newcastle KB United	2–0	Adelaide City	Newcastle
	Jones 19'; Johnston 74'	Report		Stadium: Newcastle International Sports Centre; Attendance: 10,351; Referee: Tim Davies

20 June 1982 19	St George-Budapest	3–0	Newcastle KB United	Sydney
	Marton 69', 84'; Wilkinson 89'	Report		Stadium: St George Stadium; Attendance: 4,435; Referee: Ken Small

26 June 1982 20	Newcastle KB United	3–1	Brisbane Lions	Newcastle
	Johnston 7', 52', 85'	Report	Sunderland ?'	Stadium: Newcastle International Sports Centre; Attendance: 6,524; Referee: Rob Davies

4 July 1982 21	Preston Makedonia	1–2	Newcastle KB United	Melbourne
	Ward 89'	Report	Hamilton 24'; Drinkwater 44' (pen.)	Stadium: B.T. Connor Reserve; Attendance: 3,000; Referee: David Yelland

10 July 1982 22	Newcastle KB United	1–3	Wollongong City	Newcastle
	Drinkwater 37'	Report	Cotton 15', 30'; Waldron 77'	Stadium: Newcastle International Sports Centre; Attendance: 7,489; Referee: Bill Monteverde

18 July 1982 23	South Melbourne	2–1	Newcastle KB United	Melbourne
	Buljevic 63', 75'	Report	Curran 8'	Stadium: Middle Park; Attendance: 2,500; Referee: Evan Venios

24 July 1982 24	Newcastle KB United	2–2	Sydney City	Newcastle
	Lowe 7'; Tredinnick 42'	Report	Kosmina 50' (pen.); Boden 67'	Stadium: Newcastle International Sports Centre; Attendance: 2,664; Referee: Dave Nugent

1 August 1982 25	West Adelaide	1–2	Newcastle KB United	Adelaide
	Dunn 22'	Report	Lowe 25'; Senkalski 31'	Stadium: Hindmarsh Stadium; Attendance: 2,500; Referee: Bob Kerr

7 August 1982 26	Newcastle KB United	1–0	APIA Leichhardt	Newcastle
	Drysdale 29'	Report		Stadium: Newcastle International Sports Centre; Attendance: 3,462; Referee: Gary Power

15 August 1982 27	Brisbane City	1–1	Newcastle KB United	Brisbane
	Cairney 8'	Report	Lowe 68'	Stadium: Spencer Park; Attendance: 1,200; Referee: Alan Kibbler

21 August 1982 28	Newcastle KB United	1–0	Footscray JUST	Newcastle
	Drysdale 40'	Report		Stadium: Newcastle International Sports Centre; Attendance: 3,864; Referee: Tim Davies

28 August 1982 29	Newcastle KB United	4–2	Canberra City	Newcastle
	Senkalski 23'; Drinkwater 37'; Drysdale 47', 56'	Report	Purdie 39'; Maclaren 77'	Stadium: Newcastle International Sports Centre; Attendance: 3,200; Referee: Jim Reeves

5 September 1982 30	Marconi Fairfield	3–1	Newcastle KB United	Sydney
	Henderson 72'; Licata 80'; Jankovics 82'	Report	Hamilton 41'	Stadium: Marconi Stadium; Attendance: 1,880; Referee: Tony Boskovic

=== NSL Cup ===
14 June 1982 First round	Newcastle KB United	2–2 (a.e.t.) (2–4 p)	Marconi Fairfield	Gosford
	Lowe 10', 30'	Report	Bland 81', ?'	Stadium: Grahame Park; Attendance: 2,874

== Statistics ==
=== Appearances and goals ===
Players with no appearances not included in the list.

No.	Pos.	Nat.	Name	National Soccer League		NSL Cup		Total	
No.	Pos.	Nat.	Name	Apps	Goals	Apps	Goals	Apps	Goals
1	GK	(New Zealand)	Phil Dando	26	0	0	0	26	0
2	DF	(Australia)	Neil Endacott	11(1)	0	0	0	12	0
3	FW	(Australia)	Howard Tredinnick	28	3	0	0	28	3
4	MF	(Australia)	Joe Senkalski	16(1)	4	0	0	17	4
5	MF	(England)	Craig Mason	28	2	0	0	28	2
6	DF	(England)	Roy Drinkwater	17	4	0	0	17	4
7		(Australia)	Brett Gemmell	9	1	0	0	9	1
8	MF	(Australia)	David Lowe	25	9	0	0	25	9
9	FW	(England)	David Jones	24(4)	3	0	0	28	3
10	FW	(New Zealand)	Alf Stamp	12(11)	2	0	0	23	2
11	MF	(England)	Ian Buckley	0(1)	0	0	0	1	0
12	MF	(Australia)	Trevor Smythe	10(1)	0	0	0	11	0
13		(Australia)	Iain McGregor	3(4)	0	0	0	7	0
14	MF	(Australia)	Malcolm McClelland	18(1)	3	0	0	19	3
15	DF	(Australia)	Colin Curran	19	1	0	0	19	1
16	DF	(Australia)	John Sneddon	29	0	0	0	29	0
17		(Scotland)	Stuart Robertson	10	0	0	0	10	0
18	MF	(Malaysia)	Gary Dooley	8(1)	0	0	0	9	0
20	GK	(New Zealand)	Clint Gosling	4	0	0	0	4	0
—	FW	(Australia)	Nigel Drysdale	6	4	0	0	6	4
—		(Australia)	Jim Hamilton	15	3	0	0	15	3
—	MF	(England)	Craig Johnston	4	4	0	0	4	4
—	MF	(Australia)	Bernard Kerby	1	0	0	0	1	0
—	DF	(Australia)	Ralph Maier	5	0	0	0	5	0
—	DF	(Australia)	Andrew Thompson	2	0	0	0	2	0

=== Clean sheets ===
Rank	No.	Pos	Nat	Name	National Soccer League	NSL Cup	Total
1	1	GK	(New Zealand)	Phil Dando	4	0	4
2	20	GK	(Australia)	Clint Gosling	1	0	1
Total					5	0	5
