= 1979 Newcastle KB United season =

Newcastle KB United
1979 season
- Manager: Alan Vest
- Stadium: Newcastle International Sports Centre
- National Soccer League: 6th
- NSL Cup: Semi-finals
- Top goalscorer: League: Ken Boden (12); All: Ken Boden (15)
- Highest home attendance: 18,376 vs. Sydney Olympic (14 April 1979); National Soccer League
- Lowest home attendance: 4,427 vs. Sydney City (30 May 1979); NSL Cup
- Average home league attendance: 10,245
- Biggest win: 5–1 vs. Canberra City (A) (18 August 1979); National Soccer League
- Biggest defeat: 0–3 vs. Brisbane Lions (A) (6 May 1979); National Soccer League

The 1979 season was the second in the history of Newcastle KB United. It was also the second season in the National Soccer League. In addition to the domestic league, they also participated in the NSL Cup. Newcastle KB United finished 6th in their National Soccer League season, and were eliminated in the NSL Cup semi-finals by St George-Budapest.

== Players ==
Note: Flags indicate national team as defined under FIFA eligibility rules; some limited exceptions apply. Players may hold more than one non-FIFA nationality.

No.	Pos.	Nation	Player
1	GK	NZL	Phil Dando
2	MF	AUS	Peter Willis
3	DF	AUS	Neil Endacott
4	MF	ENG	Craig Mason
5	DF	ENG	Bill Summerscales
6	DF	ENG	Roy Drinkwater
8	MF	ENG	Ian Seddon
9	MF	AUS	Ken Boden
10	FW	ENG	Graham Heys
11	FW	ENG	David Jones
12	MF	AUS	Joe Senkalski
13		AUS	Mike Galpin

No.	Pos.	Nation	Player
14	DF	AUS	John Sneddon
15	DF	AUS	Colin Curran
16	MF	AUS	Peter Tredinnick
17		ENG	Jim McBreen
18	DF	AUS	Michael Boogaard
19	MF	AUS	Malcolm McClelland
20	GK	SCO	Jim Preston
21		AUS	Keith Harris
22	DF	AUS	Brett Cowburn
—	DF	AUS	Arno Bertogna
—		AUS	Kevin Keelan

== Competitions ==
=== Overview ===
Competition	First match	Last match	Starting round	Final position	Record							
Competition	First match	Last match	Starting round	Final position	Pld	W	D	L	GF	GA	GD	Win %
National Soccer League	11 March 1979	22 September 1979	Matchday 1	6th	26	11	9	6	43	30	+13	42.31
NSL Cup	25 April 1979	12 August 1979	First round	Semi-finals	4	3	1	0	8	3	+5	75.00
Total					30	14	10	6	51	33	+18	46.67

Source: Competitions

=== National Soccer League ===
==== League table ====
Pos	Team	Pld	W	D	L	GF	GA	GD	Pts	Qualification or relegation
1	Marconi Fairfield (C)	26	15	6	5	58	32	+26	40 (Note: A Bonus Point was awarded for victories of 4 goals or more.)	Qualification to Finals series (Note: The Finals series was not considered the championship for the 1979 National Soccer League.)
2	Heidelberg United	26	14	7	5	44	30	+14	36	Qualification to Finals series
3	Sydney City	26	15	3	8	47	29	+18	34	Qualification to Finals series
4	Brisbane City	26	14	5	7	38	30	+8	34	Qualification to Finals series
5	Adelaide City	26	13	6	7	43	27	+16	33	
6	Newcastle KB United	26	11	9	6	43	30	+13	32	
7	West Adelaide	26	10	4	12	28	31	−3	25	
8	APIA Leichhardt	26	11	3	12	29	37	−8	25	
9	Brisbane Lions	26	8	6	12	28	40	−12	22	
10	Footscray JUST	26	8	3	15	29	43	−14	20	
11	St George-Budapest	26	7	6	13	27	43	−16	20	
12	Canberra City	26	6	8	12	25	41	−16	20	
13	Sydney Olympic (R)	26	7	5	14	23	30	−7	19	Relegated to the 1980 NSW State League
14	South Melbourne	26	6	3	17	26	45	−19	16	

Updated to match(es) played on unknown. Source: rsssf.com
Rules for classification: 1) points; 2) goal difference; 3) number of goals scored.
(C) Champions; (R) Relegated

==== Results by round ====
Round	1	2	3	4	5	6	7	8	9	10	11	12	13	14	15	16	17	18	19	20	21	22	23	24	25	26
Ground	H	A	H	A	A	H	A	H	A	H	A	H	A	H	A	H	A	H	A	H	A	H	A	H	A	H
Result	W	D	W	W	D	W	W	L	L	L	L	W	L	D	W	W	D	D	D	D	W	D	L	W	D	W
Position	2	3	2	1	1	1	2	2	3	3	5	5	5	6	4	4	4	5	3	6	5	4	5	5	6	6
Points	2	3	5	7	8	10	12	12	12	12	12	14	14	15	17	19	20	21	22	23	26	27	27	29	30	32

Source: worldfootball.net
A = Away; H = Home; W = Win; D = Draw; L = Loss

==== Matches ====
11 March 1979 1	Newcastle KB United	3–0 (Note: Awarded score. Original score 2–1 to Newcastle KB United; result was changed after the Australian Soccer Federation determined that South Melbourne fielded ineligible player Tony Tuner.)	South Melbourne	Newcastle
14:30 AEDT	Curran 16'; Summerscales 57'	Report	Baxter 19'	Stadium: Newcastle International Sports Centre; Attendance: 7,332; Referee: Peter Rampley

18 March 1979 2	West Adelaide	1–1	Newcastle KB United	Adelaide
14:30 ACDT	Pillans 80'	Report	Sneddon 88'	Stadium: Hindmarsh Stadium; Attendance: 6,127; Referee: Graham Neale

25 March 1979 3	Newcastle KB United	4–1	Brisbane City	Newcastle
14:30 AEDT	Curran 15'; Summerscales 37'; Boden 49'; Heys 67'	Report	Low 7'	Stadium: Newcastle International Sports Centre; Attendance: 9,032; Referee: Tim Davies

1 April 1979 4	APIA Leichhardt	1–3	Newcastle KB United	Sydney
15:00 AEDT	Scott 2'	Report	Drinkwater 68', 73'; Boden 77'	Stadium: Wentworth Park; Attendance: 2,673; Referee: Henry Witschge

8 April 1979 5	Adelaide City	0–0	Newcastle KB United	Adelaide
14:30 ACST		Report		Stadium: Olympic Sports Field; Attendance: 5,100; Referee: Don Campbell

14 April 1979 6	Newcastle KB United	2–0	Sydney Olympic	Newcastle
	Heys 58'; Cowburn 81'	Report		Stadium: Newcastle International Sports Centre; Attendance: 18,376; Referee: Richard Lorenc

22 April 1979 7	Heidelberg United	2–4	Newcastle KB United	Melbourne
	Buljevic 78'; Selemidis 88'	Report	Drinkwater 7'; Heys 35', 85'; Boden 49'	Stadium: Olympic Park; Attendance: 3,500; Referee: Chris Bambridge

28 April 1979 8	Newcastle KB United	0–2	Canberra City	Newcastle
14:30 AEST		Report	Davies 7'; Byrne 89'	Stadium: Newcastle International Sports Centre; Attendance: 8,359; Referee: Tony Boskovic

6 May 1979 9	Brisbane Lions	3–0	Newcastle KB United	Brisbane
	Brennan 37', 65', 79'	Report		Stadium: Perry Park; Attendance: 1,300; Referee: Peter Rampley

12 May 1979 10	Newcastle KB United	0–1	Sydney City	Newcastle
14:30 AEST		Report	Campbell 63'	Stadium: Newcastle International Sports Centre; Attendance: 9,832; Referee: Henry Witschge

3 June 1979 11	Marconi Fairfield	2–1	Newcastle KB United	Sydney
15:00 AEST	Jankovics 45', 55'	Report	Drinkwater 80'	Stadium: Marconi Oval; Attendance: 7,673; Referee: Richard Lorenc

9 June 1979 12	Newcastle KB United	4–2	St George-Budapest	Newcastle
14:30 AEST	Drinkwater 2', 68' (pen.); Summerscales 32'; Cowburn 75'	Report	Cotton 43'; Hensman 89'	Stadium: Newcastle International Sports Centre; Attendance: 8,288; Referee: Jim Reeves

17 June 1979 13	Footscray JUST	2–0	Newcastle KB United	Melbourne
15:00 AEST	Ilioski 80'; Picioane 87'	Report		Stadium: Olympic Park; Attendance: 1,200; Referee: Stewart Mellings

23 June 1979 14	Newcastle KB United	0–0	West Adelaide	Newcastle
14:30 AEST		Report		Stadium: Newcastle International Sports Centre; Attendance: 8,687; Referee: Des Miles

1 July 1979 15	South Melbourne	1–2	Newcastle KB United	Melbourne
	Christopoulos 52'	Report	Drinkwater 6'; Senkalski 38'	Stadium: Middle Park; Attendance: 3,200; Referee: Tony Beazleigh

7 July 1979 16	Newcastle KB United	1–0	APIA Leichhardt	Newcastle
14:30 AEST	Boden 32'	Report		Stadium: Newcastle International Sports Centre; Attendance: 10,012; Referee: Peter Rampley

15 July 1979 17	Brisbane City	1–1	Newcastle KB United	Brisbane
	Caldwell 72'	Report	Curran 80'	Stadium: Perry Park; Attendance: 3,755; Referee: Henry Witschge

21 July 1979 18	Newcastle KB United	0–0	Adelaide City	Newcastle
14:30 AEST		Report		Stadium: Newcastle International Sports Centre; Attendance: 12,143; Referee: Tony Boskovic

29 July 1979 19	Sydney Olympic	1–1	Newcastle KB United	Sydney
	Eaton 50'	Report	Jones 1'	Stadium: Pratten Park; Attendance: 3,575; Referee: Doug Rennie

4 August 1979 20	Newcastle KB United	3–3	Heidelberg United	Newcastle
14:30 AEST	Senkalski 8'; Heys 28'; Boden 48'	Report	Buljevic 36'; Tansey 76'; Cole 77'	Stadium: Newcastle International Sports Centre; Attendance: 10,134; Referee: Bill Jones

18 August 1979 21	Canberra City	1–5	Newcastle KB United	Canberra
	Farrell 67'	Report	Moulis 45' (o.g.); Heys 47'; McClelland 60'; Boden 67', 83'	Stadium: Bruce Stadium; Attendance: 2,750; Referee: Dave Nugent

25 August 1979 22	Newcastle KB United	2–2	Brisbane Lions	Newcastle
14:30 AEST	Boden 10'; Curran 45'	Report	Millman 68'; Hermiston 87' (pen.)	Stadium: Newcastle International Sports Centre; Attendance: 11,118; Referee: Richard Lorenc

1 September 1979 23	Sydney City	2–0	Newcastle KB United	Gosford
	Trenter 25'; Silva 74'	Report		Stadium: Grahame Park; Attendance: 6,730; Referee: Tim Davies

8 September 1979 24	Newcastle KB United	2–1	Marconi Fairfield	Newcastle
14:30 AEST	Curran 23', 55'	Report	Jankovics 25'	Stadium: Newcastle International Sports Centre; Attendance: 12,448; Referee: Des Miles

16 September 1979 25	St George-Budapest	1–1	Newcastle KB United	Sydney
	Grosse 12'	Report	Boden 46'	Stadium: St George Stadium; Attendance: 3,017; Referee: Henry Witschge

22 September 1979 26	Newcastle KB United	3–0	Footscray JUST	Newcastle
14:30 AEST	Boden 21', 24', 39'	Report		Stadium: Newcastle International Sports Centre; Attendance: 7,422; Referee: Tony Boskovic

=== NSL Cup ===
25 April 1979 First round	Newcastle KB United	3–2	Edgeworth Eagles	Newcastle
	Boden 26', 47'; Heys 38'	Report	Blazejewski 75'; Parkinson 90'	Stadium: Newcastle International Sports Centre; Attendance: Referee: Bill Jones

19 May 1979 Second round	Newcastle KB United	3–0	Sydney Olympic	Newcastle
	Senkalski 24', 66', 71'	Report		Stadium: Newcastle International Sports Centre; Attendance: 6,027; Referee: Ken Allen

30 May 1979 Quarter-finals	Newcastle KB United	2–1 (a.e.t.)	Sydney City	Newcastle
	Boden 67'; Summerscales 111'	Report	Stevenson 64'	Stadium: Newcastle International Sports Centre; Attendance: 4,427; Referee: Stewart Mellings

12 August 1979 Semi-finals	Newcastle KB United	0–0 (a.e.t.) (2–3 p)	St George-Budapest	Newcastle
		Report		Stadium: Newcastle International Sports Centre; Attendance: 15,177; Referee: Ken Allen

== Statistics ==
=== Appearances and goals ===
Includes all competitions. Players with no appearances not included in the list.

No.	Pos.	Nat.	Player	National Soccer League		NSL Cup		Total	
No.	Pos.	Nat.	Player	Apps	Goals	Apps	Goals	Apps	Goals
1	GK	(New Zealand)	Phil Dando	17+1	0	2	0	20	0
2	MF	(Australia)	Peter Willis	24	0	4	0	28	0
3	DF	(Australia)	Neil Endacott	2	0	0	0	2	0
4	MF	(England)	Craig Mason	1+5	0	2	0	8	0
5	DF	(England)	Bill Summerscales	20	3	4	1	24	4
6	DF	(England)	Roy Drinkwater	26	7	4	0	30	7
8	MF	(England)	Ian Seddon	9	0	1	0	10	0
9	MF	(Australia)	Ken Boden	26	12	4	3	30	15
10	FW	(England)	Graham Heys	24	6	4	1	28	7
11	FW	(England)	David Jones	1+3	1	0	0	4	1
12	MF	(Australia)	Joe Senkalski	14+1	2	3	3	18	5
14	DF	(Australia)	John Sneddon	9+6	1	0+2	0	17	1
15	DF	(Australia)	Colin Curran	26	6	4	0	30	6
16	MF	(Australia)	Peter Tredinnick	18+8	0	1+2	0	29	0
17	—	(England)	Jim McBreen	2+4	0	0+1	0	7	0
19	MF	(Australia)	Malcolm McClelland	18+6	1	3	0	27	1
20	GK	(Scotland)	Jim Preston	9	0	2	0	11	0
21	—	(Australia)	Keith Harris	6	0	1	0	7	0
22	DF	(Australia)	Brett Cowburn	13+1	2	2+1	0	17	2
—	DF	(Australia)	Arno Bertogna	15	0	3	0	18	0
—	—	(Australia)	Kevin Keelan	6	0	0	0	6	0

=== Clean sheets ===
Includes all competitions. The list is sorted by squad number when total clean sheets are equal. Numbers in parentheses represent games where both goalkeepers participated and both kept a clean sheet; the number in parentheses is awarded to the goalkeeper who was substituted on, whilst a full clean sheet is awarded to the goalkeeper who was on the field at the start of play. Goalkeepers with no clean sheets not included in the list.

Rank	No.	Nat.	Goalkeeper	NSL	NSL Cup	Total
1	1	(New Zealand)	Phil Dando	4	1	5
2	20	(Scotland)	Jim Preston	3	1	4
Total				7	2	9
