= 1981 Newcastle KB United season =

Newcastle KB United
1981 season
- Manager: Alan Vest; Ray Baartz
- National Soccer League: 10th
- NSL Cup: First round
- Top goalscorer: League: Bob Mountford (7); All: Bob Mountford (8)
- Highest home attendance: 7,567 vs. Wollongong City (29 March 1981); National Soccer League
- Lowest home attendance: 3,827 vs. Canberra City (10 May 1981); National Soccer League
- Average home league attendance: 5,481
- Biggest win: 4–0 vs. Preston Makedonia (H) (12 April 1981); National Soccer League
- Biggest defeat: 1–4 (3 times)

The 1981 season was the fourth in the history of Newcastle KB United. In addition to the domestic league, they also participated in the NSL Cup. Newcastle KB United finished 10th in their National Soccer League season, and were eliminated in the NSL Cup first round by Canberra City.

== Players ==
Note: Flags indicate national team as defined under FIFA eligibility rules; some limited exceptions apply. Players may hold more than one non-FIFA nationality.

No.	Pos.	Nation	Player
1	GK	NZL	Phil Dando
2	DF	ENG	Paul Reaney
3	FW	AUS	Howard Tredinnick
4	MF	AUS	Joe Senkalski
5	DF	AUS	Arno Bertogna
6	DF	ENG	Roy Drinkwater
7	MF	NZL	Steve Sumner
8	FW	ENG	Bob Mountford
9	FW	ENG	David Jones
10	FW	ENG	Graham Heys
11	MF	ENG	Ian Buckley

No.	Pos.	Nation	Player
12	MF	ENG	Craig Mason
14	DF	AUS	John Sneddon
15	DF	AUS	Colin Curran
16	FW	ENG	David Kamasz
17	MF	AUS	Malcolm McClelland
18	DF	AUS	Brett Cowburn
19	FW	NZL	Alf Stamp
20	GK	NZL	Clint Gosling
21	MF	AUS	Grant Storey
—	FW	ENG	Mick Channon
—	DF	AUS	Neil Endacott

== Competitions ==
=== Overview ===
Competition	First match	Last match	Starting round	Final position	Record							
Competition	First match	Last match	Starting round	Final position	Pld	W	D	L	GF	GA	GD	Win %
National Soccer League	15 February 1981	13 September 1981	Matchday 1	10th	30	11	8	11	41	41	+0	36.67
NSL Cup	22 March 1981		First round	First round	1	0	0	1	1	2	−1	0.00
Total					31	11	8	12	42	43	−1	35.48

Source: Competitions

=== National Soccer League ===
==== League table ====
Pos	Team	Pld	W	D	L	GF	GA	GD	Pts	Relegation
1	Sydney City (C)	30	19	5	6	59	30	+29	43	
2	South Melbourne	30	13	13	4	41	27	+14	39	
3	Brisbane City	30	12	11	7	37	25	+12	35	
4	APIA Leichhardt	30	12	11	7	39	33	+6	35	
5	Canberra City	30	13	7	10	41	32	+9	33	
6	Brisbane Lions	30	11	11	8	41	33	+8	33	
7	Adelaide City	30	13	6	11	46	42	+4	32	
8	Heidelberg United	30	12	7	11	48	40	+8	31	
9	Sydney Olympic	30	11	9	10	46	46	0	31	
10	Newcastle KB United	30	11	8	11	41	41	0	30	
11	Wollongong City	30	8	12	10	35	39	−4	28	
12	Preston Makedonia	30	9	7	14	39	41	−2	25	
13	Footscray JUST	30	9	7	14	32	48	−16	25	
14	Marconi Fairfield	30	9	7	14	23	45	−22	25	
15	Blacktown City (R)	30	6	9	15	32	47	−15	21	Relegated to the 1982 NSW State League
16	West Adelaide	30	5	4	21	26	57	−31	14	

Updated to match(es) played on unknown. Source: rsssf.com
Rules for classification: 1) points; 2) goal difference; 3) number of goals scored.
(C) Champions; (R) Relegated

==== Results summary ====
Overall								Home						Away					
Pld	W	D	L	GF	GA	GD	Pts	W	D	L	GF	GA	GD	W	D	L	GF	GA	GD
30	11	8	11	41	41	0	41	5	5	5	25	17	+8	6	3	6	16	24	−8

Source: worldfootball.net

==== Results by round ====
Round	1	2	3	4	5	6	7	8	9	10	11	12	13	14	15	16	17	18	19	20	21	22	23	24	25	26	27	28	29	30
Ground	H	A	H	A	A	H	A	H	A	H	A	H	A	H	A	H	A	H	H	A	H	A	H	A	H	A	H	A	H	A
Result	W	W	D	W	L	D	L	W	L	L	L	L	W	L	W	D	W	W	W	D	D	L	D	D	L	L	W	D	L	W
Position	1	2	2	2	4	4	7	4	7	9	11	11	11	11	10	10	10	8	8	8	7	9	9	8	9	9	8	8	10	10
Points	2	4	5	7	7	8	8	10	10	10	10	10	12	12	14	15	17	19	21	22	23	23	24	25	25	25	27	28	28	30

Source: worldfootball.net
A = Away; H = Home; W = Win; D = Draw; L = Loss

==== Matches ====
15 February 1981 1	Newcastle KB United	3–0	Footscray JUST	Newcastle
	Buckley 9'; McClelland 25', 31'	Report		Stadium: Newcastle International Sports Centre; Attendance: 5,619; Referee: Jim Reeves

22 February 1981 2	Brisbane Lions	0–1	Newcastle KB United	Brisbane
		Report	Buckley 87'	Stadium: Lions Stadium; Attendance: 1,800; Referee: Dave Nugent

1 March 1981 3	Newcastle KB United	1–1	Blacktown City	Newcastle
	Drinkwater 45'	Report	Selvage 41'	Stadium: Newcastle International Sports Centre; Attendance: 6,343; Referee: Chris Bambridge

8 March 1981 4	West Adelaide	0–1	Newcastle KB United	Adelaide
		Report	Mason 70'	Stadium: Hindmarsh Stadium; Attendance: 3,800; Referee: Bobby Kerr

15 March 1981 5	APIA Leichhardt	2–1	Newcastle KB United	Sydney
	O'Connor 75'; Soper 84'	Report	Bertogna 38'	Stadium: Lambert Park; Attendance: 4,281; Referee: Bob Mee

29 March 1981 6	Newcastle KB United	1–1	Wollongong City	Newcastle
	Drinkwater 73'	Report	Fontana 37'	Stadium: Newcastle International Sports Centre; Attendance: 7,567; Referee: Doug Rennie

5 April 1981 7	South Melbourne	2–0	Newcastle KB United	Melbourne
	Davidson 21' (pen.); Stevenson 66'	Report		Stadium: Middle Park; Attendance: 6,888; Referee: Stewart Mellings

12 April 1981 8	Newcastle KB United	4–0	Preston Makedonia	Newcastle
	Mountford 3', 75'; Senkalski 51'; Bertogna 64'	Report		Stadium: Newcastle International Sports Centre; Attendance: 4,278; Referee: Alf Rodway

19 April 1981 9	Adelaide City	4–1	Newcastle KB United	Adelaide
	Nyskohus 13', 63' (pen.); Villani 58'; Russell 65'	Report	Kamasz 27'	Stadium: Olympic Sports Field; Attendance: 3,100; Referee: Bob Kerr

26 April 1981 10	Newcastle KB United	0–2	Brisbane City	Newcastle
		Report	Ratcliffe 46'; Kelso 54'	Stadium: Newcastle International Sports Centre; Attendance: 4,569; Referee: Tony Boskovic

3 May 1981 11	Sydney City	4–1	Newcastle KB United	Sydney
	Kosmina 1', 25'; Barnes 39', 68'	Report	Jones 72'	Stadium: ES Marks Athletics Field; Attendance: 2,614; Referee: Henry Witschge

10 May 1981 12	Newcastle KB United	0–1	Canberra City	Newcastle
		Report	Gibson 60'	Stadium: Newcastle International Sports Centre; Attendance: 3,827; Referee: Jim Reeves

17 May 1981 13	Marconi Fairfield	1–2	Newcastle KB United	Sydney
	Byrne 79'	Report	Mountford 16'; Senkalski 80'	Stadium: Marconi Stadium; Attendance: 2,603; Referee: Richard Lorenc

24 May 1981 14	Newcastle KB United	1–2	Sydney Olympic	Newcastle
	Mountford 9'	Report	K. Wilson 45'; Jennings 71'	Stadium: Newcastle International Sports Centre; Attendance: 5,545; Referee: Alf Rodway

31 May 1981 15	Heidelberg United	1–2	Newcastle KB United	Melbourne
	Campbell 42'	Report	Storey 47', 82'	Stadium: Olympic Park; Attendance: 2,000; Referee: Evan Venios

7 June 1981 16	Newcastle KB United	1–1	Brisbane Lions	Newcastle
	Channon 62'	Report	Hermiston 83' (pen.)	Stadium: Newcastle International Sports Centre; Attendance: 6,060; Referee: Peter Rampley

14 June 1981 17	Blacktown City	1–2	Newcastle KB United	Sydney
	Jones 81'	Report	Heys 13'; Tredinnick 36'	Stadium: Gabbie Stadium; Attendance: 3,348; Referee: Richard Lorenc

21 June 1981 18	Newcastle KB United	4–2	West Adelaide	Newcastle
	Channon 13'; Mountford 29'; Senkalski 72', 78'	Report	Manecas 63', 78'	Stadium: Newcastle International Sports Centre; Attendance: 5,875; Referee: Doug Rennie

28 June 1981 19	Newcastle KB United	4–1	APIA Leichhardt	Newcastle
	Channon 10'; Sumner 15'; Mountford 23'; Heys 83'	Report	Soper 70'	Stadium: Newcastle International Sports Centre; Attendance: 6,850; Referee: Evan Venios

5 July 1981 20	Wollongong City	0–0	Newcastle KB United	Wollongong
		Report		Stadium: Wollongong Showground; Attendance: 2,100; Referee: Ken Small

12 July 1981 21	Newcastle KB United	0–0	South Melbourne	Newcastle
		Report		Stadium: Newcastle International Sports Centre; Attendance: 6,099; Referee: Alf Rodway

19 July 1981 22	Preston Makedonia	3–1	Newcastle KB United	Melbourne
	Lucchesi 45'; Brown 49'; Flavell 72'	Report		Stadium: B.T. Connor Reserve; Attendance: 3,000; Referee: Jim Fearn

26 July 1981 23	Newcastle KB United	2–2	Adelaide City	Newcastle
	Drinkwater 66'; Heys 87'	Report	Fashanu 5'; Melta 21'	Stadium: Newcastle International Sports Centre; Attendance: 4,787; Referee: Dave Nugent

2 August 1981 24	Brisbane City	1–1	Newcastle KB United	Brisbane
	Hamilton 70'	Report	Sumner 59'	Stadium: Ballymore Stadium; Attendance: 5,000; Referee: Peter Rampley

9 August 1981 25	Newcastle KB United	1–2	Sydney City	Newcastle
	Senkalski 34'	Report	Kosmina 49'; Watson 84'	Stadium: Newcastle International Sports Centre; Attendance: 5,232; Referee: Bob Mee

16 August 1981 26	Canberra City	4–1	Newcastle KB United	Canberra
	Byrne 14'; Brennan 32'; Valeri 78'; Purdie 86'	Report	Jones 8'	Stadium: Bruce Stadium; Attendance: 2,100; Referee: Ken Allen

23 August 1981 27	Newcastle KB United	2–0	Marconi Fairfield	Newcastle
	Mountford 26'; Sumner 59'	Report		Stadium: Newcastle International Sports Centre; Attendance: 5,027; Referee: Peter Rampley

30 August 1981 28	Sydney Olympic	1–1	Newcastle KB United	Sydney
	Wilson 45'	Report	Stamp 87'	Stadium: Pratten Park; Attendance: 5,155; Referee: Tony Boskovic

6 September 1981 29	Newcastle KB United	1–2	Heidelberg United	Newcastle
	Stamp 75'	Report	Cole 20', 52'	Stadium: Newcastle International Sports Centre; Attendance: 4,531; Referee: Dave Nugent

13 September 1981 30	Footscray JUST	0–1	Newcastle KB United	Melbourne
		Report	Heys 50'	Stadium: Schintler Reserve; Attendance: 2,800; Referee: Stewart Mellings

=== NSL Cup ===
22 March 1981 First round	Canberra City	2–1	Newcastle KB United	Canberra
	Valeri 48', 64'	Report	Mountford 29'	Stadium: Bruce Stadium; Attendance: 3,025; Referee: Tim Davies

== Statistics ==
=== Appearances and goals ===
Includes all competitions. Players with no appearances not included in the list.

No.	Pos.	Nat.	Player	National Soccer League		NSL Cup		Total	
No.	Pos.	Nat.	Player	Apps	Goals	Apps	Goals	Apps	Goals
1	GK	(New Zealand)	Phil Dando	28	0	1	0	29	0
2	DF	(England)	Paul Reaney	27	0	1	0	28	0
3	FW	(Australia)	Howard Tredinnick	21	1	0	0	21	1
4	MF	(Australia)	Joe Senkalski	29+1	5	1	0	31	5
5	DF	(Australia)	Arno Bertogna	14	2	1	0	15	2
6	DF	(England)	Roy Drinkwater	29	3	1	0	30	3
7	MF	(New Zealand)	Steve Sumner	17+1	3	0	0	18	3
8	FW	(England)	Bob Mountford	26+1	7	1	1	28	8
9	FW	(England)	David Jones	22+5	2	0+1	0	28	2
10	FW	(England)	Graham Heys	23+4	5	0	0	27	5
11	MF	(England)	Ian Buckley	12+1	2	1	0	14	2
12	MF	(England)	Craig Mason	24+3	1	1	0	28	1
14	DF	(Australia)	John Sneddon	5	0	1	0	6	0
15	DF	(Australia)	Colin Curran	8	0	1	0	9	0
16	FW	(England)	David Kamasz	12+5	1	1	0	18	1
17	MF	(Australia)	Malcolm McClelland	15+1	2	1	0	17	2
19	FW	(New Zealand)	Alf Stampp	3+6	2	0	0	9	2
20	GK	(New Zealand)	Clint Gosling	2+2	0	0	0	4	1
21	MF	(Australia)	Grant Storey	6+2	2	0	0	8	2
—	FW	(England)	Mick Channon	4	3	0	0	4	3
—	DF	(Australia)	Neil Endacott	3	0	0	0	3	0
Player(s) transferred out but featured this season
13	FW	(Australia)	Paul Burrows	0+1	0	0	0	1	0

=== Disciplinary record ===
Includes all competitions. The list is sorted by squad number when total cards are equal. Players with no cards not included in the list.

Rank	No.	Pos.	Nat.	Player	National Soccer League			NSL Cup			Total		
Rank	No.	Pos.	Nat.	Player	Yellow card	Second yellow card	Red card	Yellow card	Second yellow card	Red card	Yellow card	Second yellow card	Red card
1	8	FW	(England)	Bob Mountford	4	0	0	0	0	0	4	0	0
2	2	DF	(England)	Paul Reaney	2	0	0	0	0	0	2	0	0
2	3	FW	(Australia)	Howard Tredinnick	2	0	0	0	0	0	2	0	0
2	4	MF	(Australia)	Joe Senkalski	2	0	0	0	0	0	2	0	0
2	6	DF	(England)	Roy Drinkwater	2	0	0	0	0	0	2	0	0
2	14	DF	(Australia)	John Sneddon	2	0	0	0	0	0	2	0	0
2	16	FW	(England)	David Kamasz	2	0	0	0	0	0	2	0	0
2	17	MF	(Australia)	Malcolm McClelland	2	0	0	0	0	0	2	0	0
9	5	DF	(Australia)	Arno Bertogna	1	0	0	0	0	0	1	0	0
9	7	MF	(New Zealand)	Steve Sumner	1	0	0	0	0	0	1	0	0
9	9	FW	(England)	David Jones	1	0	0	0	0	0	1	0	0
9	10	FW	(England)	Graham Heys	1	0	0	0	0	0	1	0	0
9	12	MF	(England)	Craig Mason	1	0	0	0	0	0	1	0	0
9	15	DF	(Australia)	Colin Curran	1	0	0	0	0	0	1	0	0
9	21	MF	(Australia)	Grant Storey	1	0	0	0	0	0	1	0	0
Total					25	0	0	0	0	0	25	0	0

=== Clean sheets ===
Includes all competitions. The list is sorted by squad number when total clean sheets are equal. Numbers in parentheses represent games where both goalkeepers participated and both kept a clean sheet; the number in parentheses is awarded to the goalkeeper who was substituted on, whilst a full clean sheet is awarded to the goalkeeper who was on the field at the start of play. Goalkeepers with no clean sheets not included in the list.

Rank	No.	Nat.	Goalkeeper	NSL	NSL Cup	Total
1	1	(New Zealand)	Phil Dando	8	0	8
Total				8	0	8
