= 1978 Newcastle KB United season =

Newcastle KB United
1978 season
- Manager: Alan Vest
- Stadium: Newcastle International Sports Centre; Macquarie Field
- National Soccer League: 11th
- NSL Cup: Semi-finals
- Top goalscorer: League: Ken Boden (14); All: Ken Boden (15)
- Highest home attendance: 16,614 vs. Marconi Fairfield (27 August 1978); National Soccer League
- Lowest home attendance: 3,544 vs. Sydney Croatia (2 August 1978); NSL Cup
- Average home league attendance: 8,516
- Biggest win: 3–0 vs. Canberra City (H) (1 July 1978); National Soccer League
- Biggest defeat: 1–4 vs. Eastern Suburbs (H) (5 March 1978); National Soccer League; 0–3 vs. South Melbourne (A) (19 March 1978); National Soccer League

The 1978 season was the first in the history of Newcastle KB United. It was also the first season in the National Soccer League. In addition to the domestic league, they also participated in the NSL Cup. Newcastle KB United finished 11th in their National Soccer League season, and were eliminated in the NSL Cup semi-finals by Brisbane City.

== Players ==
Note: Flags indicate national team as defined under FIFA eligibility rules; some limited exceptions apply. Players may hold more than one non-FIFA nationality.

No.	Pos.	Nation	Player
1	GK	NZL	Phil Dando
2	MF	AUS	Peter Willis
3	DF	AUS	Neil Endacott
4	MF	ENG	Craig Mason
5	DF	ENG	Bill Summerscales
6	DF	ENG	Roy Drinkwater (Captain)
7	MF	AUS	Lloyd Hardes
8		AUS	Slav Catalovski
9	MF	AUS	Ken Boden
11	MF	NZL	Bill Amey
12	MF	AUS	John Turnbull

No.	Pos.	Nation	Player
13		AUS	Mike Galpin
14	DF	AUS	John Sneddon
15	DF	AUS	Colin Curran
16	MF	AUS	Peter Tredinnick
17	FW	ENG	Bob Mountford
18	MF	ENG	Craig Johnston
19	FW	AUS	Alan Vest
20		AUS	Ossie Bellamy
—	FW	AUS	Ray Baartz
—	FW	ENG	Bobby Charlton
—	MF	AUS	Joe Senkalski

== Competitions ==
=== Overview ===
Competition	First match	Last match	Starting round	Final position	Record							
Competition	First match	Last match	Starting round	Final position	Pld	W	D	L	GF	GA	GD	Win %
National Soccer League	5 March 1978	27 August 1978	Matchday 1	11th	26	6	10	10	33	40	−7	23.08
NSL Cup	17 May 1978	1 October 1978	First round	Semi-finals	4	3	0	1	5	3	+2	75.00
Total					30	9	10	11	38	43	−5	30.00

Source: Competitions

=== National Soccer League ===
==== League table ====
Pos	Team	Pld	W	D	L	GF	GA	GD	Pts
9	Western Suburbs	26	9	6	11	41	45	−4	24
10	Adelaide City	26	9	6	11	38	44	−6	24
11	Newcastle KB United	26	6	10	10	33	40	−7	22
12	Footscray JUST	26	7	8	11	29	37	−8	22
13	Canberra City	26	5	10	11	28	41	−13	20

Source: rsssf.com
Rules for classification: 1) Points; 2) Goal difference; 3) Goals scored

==== Results by round ====
Round	1	2	3	4	5	6	7	8	9	10	11	12	13	14	15	16	17	18	19	20	21	22	23	24	25	26
Ground	H	A	A	H	A	A	H	A	H	H	A	H	A	H	A	H	A	H	H	A	H	A	A	H	A	H
Result	L	D	L	L	D	W	D	D	D	D	W	L	L	W	L	D	L	W	L	D	D	L	L	D	W	W
Position	13	13	14	14	14	12	13	13	13	13	10	13	12	11	11	11	12	10	11	11	12	12	12	12	11	11
Points	0	1	1	1	2	4	5	6	7	8	10	10	10	12	12	13	13	15	15	16	17	17	17	18	20	22

Source: worldfootball.net
A = Away; H = Home; W = Win; D = Draw; L = Loss

==== Matches ====
5 March 1978 1	Newcastle KB United	1–4	Eastern Suburbs	Newcastle
15:00 AEDT	Boden 78'	Report	Watson 36'; Silva 62', 64'; Barnes 82'	Stadium: Newcastle International Sports Centre; Attendance: 15,067; Referee: Peter Rampley

12 March 1978 2	Western Suburbs	1–1	Newcastle KB United	Sydney
	C. Eaton 70'	Report	Curran 42'	Stadium: Englefield Stadium; Attendance: 1,053; Referee: Dennis McDermott

19 March 1978 3	South Melbourne	3–0	Newcastle KB United	Melbourne
	Ollerton 15', 74'; Hagegmanouil 76'	Report		Stadium: Middle Park; Attendance: 5,000; Referee: Jim Dixon

25 March 1978 4	Newcastle KB United	0–1	West Adelaide	Newcastle
		Report	Drinkwater 45' (o.g.)	Stadium: Newcastle International Sports Centre; Attendance: 7,019; Referee: Richard Lorenc

1 April 1978 5	Canberra City	2–2	Newcastle KB United	Canberra
14:45 AEDT	Byrne 67'; Stoddart 73'	Report	Mason 33'; Drinkwater 39'	Stadium: Bruce Stadium; Attendance: 3,200; Referee: Des Miles

9 April 1978 6	St George-Budapest	2–3	Newcastle KB United	Sydney
	O'Connor 13'; Jones 73'	Report	Endacott 16'; Boden 42'; Harris 72' (o.g.)	Stadium: St George Stadium; Attendance: 1,637; Referee: Doug Rennie

15 April 1978 7	Newcastle KB United	1–1	Sydney Olympic	Newcastle
	Boden 27'	Report	Senkalski 31'	Stadium: Newcastle International Sports Centre; Attendance: 5,287; Referee: Tony Boskovic

23 April 1978 8	Adelaide City	1–1	Newcastle KB United	Adelaide
	B. Nyskohus 69'	Report	Galpin 42'	Stadium: Olympic Sports Field; Attendance: 5,123; Referee: Graham Neal

29 April 1978 9	Newcastle KB United	2–2	Brisbane Lions	Newcastle
	Boden 6'; Mason 78'	Report	Hughes 82'; Spearritt 84'	Stadium: Macquarie Field; Attendance: 5,018; Referee: Barry Wilkinson

6 May 1978 10	Newcastle KB United	2–2	Fitzroy United	Newcastle
	Boden 20'; Mason 83'	Report	Buljevic 65'; Campbell 70'	Stadium: Newcastle International Sports Centre; Attendance: 7,826

13 May 1978 11	Footscray JUST	0–1	Newcastle KB United	Melbourne
		Report	Mountford 48'	Stadium: Schintler Reserve; Attendance: 3,000; Referee: David Yelland

24 May 1978 12	Newcastle KB United	2–3	Brisbane City	Newcastle
	Boden 8'; Curran 75'	Report	Mason 13' (o.g.); Gaffney 50'; Coyne 82'	Stadium: Newcastle International Sports Centre; Attendance: 6,208; Referee: Brian Fowler

28 May 1978 13	Marconi Fairfield	4–2	Newcastle KB United	Sydney
15:00 AEST	Mariani 19'; Sharne 62', 80'; Drinkwater 75' (o.g.)	Report	Galpin 5', 49'	Stadium: Marconi Oval; Attendance: 8,936; Referee: Doug Rennie

3 June 1978 14	Newcastle KB United	2–1	Western Suburbs	Newcastle
14:30 AEST	Mountford 37'; Drinkwater 80'	Report	Scott 72'	Stadium: Newcastle International Sports Centre; Attendance: 6,789; Referee: Peter Rampley

11 June 1978 15	Eastern Suburbs	1–0	Newcastle KB United	Sydney
13:00 AEST	Campbell 16'	Report		Stadium: Wentworth Park; Attendance: 4,725; Referee: Richard Lorenc

17 June 1978 16	Newcastle KB United	1–1	South Melbourne	Newcastle
14:30 AEST	Summerscales 72'	Report	Cummings 63'	Stadium: Newcastle International Sports Centre; Attendance: 7,357; Referee: Tim Davies

25 June 1978 17	West Adelaide	1–0	Newcastle KB United	Adelaide
	Bozanic 21'	Report		Stadium: Hindmarsh Stadium; Attendance: 4,400; Referee: Jim Johnston

1 July 1978 18	Newcastle KB United	3–0	Canberra City	Newcastle
	Boden 2', 47' (pen.); Curran 82'	Report		Stadium: Newcastle International Sports Centre; Attendance: 9,057; Referee: Barry Wilkinson

8 July 1978 19	Newcastle KB United	1–2	St George-Budapest	Newcastle
	Summerscales 49'	Report	Willis 6' (o.g.); O'Shea 24'	Stadium: Newcastle International Sports Centre; Attendance: 10,197; Referee: Doug Rennie

16 July 1978 20	Sydney Olympic	1–1	Newcastle KB United	Sydney
	Ainslie 22'	Report	Boden ?'	Stadium: St George Stadium; Attendance: 4,953; Referee: Peter Rampley

22 July 1978 21	Newcastle KB United	2–2	Adelaide City	Newcastle
	Drinkwater 14'; Boden 65' (pen.)	Report	Northcote 80'; Deans 85'	Stadium: Newcastle International Sports Centre; Attendance: 7,434; Referee: Tony Boskovic

30 July 1978 22	Brisbane Lions	2–1	Newcastle KB United	Brisbane
	Fairbrother 16'; Hermiston 18'	Report	Boden 90'	Stadium: Perry Park; Attendance: 3,500; Referee: Jack Wood

6 August 1978 23	Fitzroy United	1–0	Newcastle KB United	Melbourne
	Taylor 69' (pen.)	Report		Stadium: Olympic Park; Attendance: 4,500; Referee: Chris Bambridge

12 August 1978 24	Newcastle KB United	1–1	Footscray JUST	Newcastle
	Boden 38' (pen.)	Report	Ristovski 23'	Stadium: Newcastle International Sports Centre; Attendance: 6,834; Referee: Tim Davies

20 August 1978 25	Brisbane City	1–2	Newcastle KB United	Brisbane
	Kelso 2'	Report	Boden 40', 87' (pen.)	Stadium: Perry Park; Attendance: 2,600; Referee: Dave Nugent

27 August 1978 26	Newcastle KB United	1–0	Marconi Fairfield	Newcastle
14:30 AEST	Endacott 56'	Report		Stadium: Newcastle International Sports Centre; Attendance: 16,614; Referee: Richard Lorenc

=== NSL Cup ===
Win Draw Loss

17 May 1978 First round	Weston Bears	1–2	Newcastle KB United	Newcastle
	JJ. Trunbull 12'	Report	Drinkwater 58'; Summerscales 68'	Stadium: Weston Park; Attendance: 1,500; Referee: Alf Rodway

2 August 1978 Second round	Newcastle KB United	2–0	Sydney Croatia	Newcastle
	Galpin 38'; Boden 51' (pen.)	Report		Stadium: Newcastle International Sports Centre; Attendance: 3,544; Referee: Bill Jones

3 September 1978 Quarter-finals	Newcastle KB United	1–0	Western Suburbs	Newcastle
	Tredinnick 86'	Report		Stadium: Newcastle International Sports Centre; Attendance: 6,417; Referee: Jack Wood

1 October 1978 Semi-finals	Brisbane City	2–0 (a.e.t.)	Newcastle KB United	Brisbane
	Caldwell 105' (pen.); Kelso 119'	Report		Stadium: Perry Park; Attendance: 3,000; Referee: Henry Witschge

== Statistics ==
=== Appearances and goals ===
Includes all competitions. Players with no appearances not included in the list.

No.	Pos.	Nat.	Player	National Soccer League		NSL Cup		Total	
No.	Pos.	Nat.	Player	Apps	Goals	Apps	Goals	Apps	Goals
1	GK	(New Zealand)	Phil Dando	26	0	4	0	30	0
2	MF	(Australia)	Peter Willis	25	0	4	0	29	0
3	DF	(Australia)	Neil Endacott	16+1	2	3	0	20	2
4	MF	(England)	Craig Mason	26	3	3+1	0	30	3
5	DF	(England)	Bill Summerscales	26	2	4	1	30	3
6	DF	(England)	Roy Drinkwater	26	3	4	1	30	4
7	MF	(Australia)	Lloyd Hardes	13+1	0	1+1	0	16	0
8	FW	(Australia)	Slav Catalovski	1+3	0	0	0	4	0
9	MF	(Australia)	Ken Boden	26	14	4	1	30	15
11	MF	(New Zealand)	Bill Amey	16+1	0	1	0	18	0
12	MF	(Australia)	John Turnbull	1	0	0	0	1	0
13	—	(Australia)	Mike Galpin	22+1	3	3+1	1	27	4
14	DF	(Australia)	John Sneddon	8+1	0	4	0	13	0
15	DF	(Australia)	Colin Curran	25+1	3	4	0	30	3
16	MF	(Australia)	Peter Tredinnick	8+5	0	3	1	16	1
17	FW	(England)	Bob Mountford	9	2	1	0	10	2
18	MF	(England)	Craig Johnston	9	0	1	0	10	0
19	FW	(Australia)	Alan Vest	0+1	0	0	0	1	0
—	FW	(England)	Bobby Charlton	1	0	0	0	1	0
—	MF	(Australia)	Joe Senkalski	1+2	0	0	0	3	0
Player(s) transferred out but featured this season
10	MF	(Australia)	Paul Kay	1+2	0	0	0	3	0

=== Disciplinary record ===
Includes all competitions. The list is sorted by squad number when total cards are equal. Players with no cards not included in the list.

Rank	No.	Pos.	Nat.	Player	National Soccer League			NSL Cup			Total		
Rank	No.	Pos.	Nat.	Player	Yellow card	Second yellow card	Red card	Yellow card	Second yellow card	Red card	Yellow card	Second yellow card	Red card
1	11	MF	(New Zealand)	Bill Amey	2	0	0	0	0	1	2	0	1
2	2	MF	(Australia)	Peter Willis	2	0	0	0	0	0	2	0	0
2	4	MF	(England)	Craig Mason	2	0	0	0	0	0	2	0	0
2	17	FW	(Australia)	Bob Mountford	2	0	0	0	0	0	2	0	0
5	5	DF	(England)	Bill Summerscales	1	0	0	0	0	0	1	0	0
5	15	DF	(Australia)	Colin Curran	1	0	0	0	0	0	1	0	0
5	18	MF	(England)	Craig Johnston	1	0	0	0	0	0	1	0	0
Total					11	0	0	0	0	1	11	0	1

=== Clean sheets ===
Includes all competitions. The list is sorted by squad number when total clean sheets are equal. Numbers in parentheses represent games where both goalkeepers participated and both kept a clean sheet; the number in parentheses is awarded to the goalkeeper who was substituted on, whilst a full clean sheet is awarded to the goalkeeper who was on the field at the start of play. Goalkeepers with no clean sheets not included in the list.

Rank	No.	Nat.	Goalkeeper	NSL	NSL Cup	Total
1	1	(New Zealand)	Phil Dando	3	2	5
Total				3	2	5
