= List of Newcastle KB United records and statistics =

Newcastle KB United was an Australian semi-professional association football club based in Newcastle. The club was formed in 1977 was admitted into the National Soccer League in 1978. The club had never qualified for the Finals series in the National Soccer League in all seven seasons of existence until they became defunct after playing seven rounds of the 1984 National Soccer League season and being replaced by another Newcastle club Newcastle Rosebud United (now Adamstown Rosebud).

The list encompasses the records set by the club, their managers and their players. The player records section itemises the club's leading goalscorers and those who have made most appearances in first-team competitions. It also records notable achievements by Newcastle KB United players on the international stage. Attendance records in Newcastle are also included.

The club's record appearance maker is Craig Mason, who made 152 appearances between 1978 and 1984. Ken Boden is Newcastle KB United's record goalscorer, scoring 30 goals in total.

== Player records ==
=== Appearances ===
- Most NSL appearances: Craig Mason, 142
- Most NSL Cup appearances: Colin Curran and Roy Drinkwater, 11
- Most separate spells with the club: Bob Mountford, 3 (1978; 1981 and 1983)

==== Most appearances ====
Competitive matches only, includes appearances as substitute. Numbers in brackets indicate goals scored.

Rank	Player	Years	National Soccer League	NSL Cup	Total
1	(England) Craig Mason	1978–1984	142 (12)	10 (1)	152 (13)
2	(England) Roy Drinkwater	1978–1982	124 (19)	11 (2)	135 (21)
3	(Australia) Joe Senkalski	1978–1984	119 (19)	7 (3)	126 (22)
4	(New Zealand) Phil Dando	1978–1982	114 (0)	9 (0)	123 (0)
5	(England) David Jones	1978–1984	113 (16)	4 (0)	117 (16)
6	(Australia) Colin Curran	1978–1982; 1984	103 (11)	11 (0)	114 (11)
7	(Australia) Malcolm McClelland	1978–1982	76 (9)	6 (0)	82 (9)
7	(Australia) Howard Tredinnick	1980–1983	76 (9)	6 (0)	82 (9)
9	(Australia) John Sneddon	1978–1982	72 (1)	7 (0)	79 (1)
10	(England) Graham Heys	1979–1981	73 (19)	5 (1)	78 (20)

=== Goalscorers ===
- Most goals in a season: Ken Boden, 15 goals (in the 1978 and 1979 season)
- Most league goals in a season: Ken Boden, 14 goals in the National Soccer League, 1978

==== Top goalscorers ====
Ken Boden was the all-time top goalscorer for Newcastle KB United.

Competitive matches only. Numbers in brackets indicate appearances made.

Rank	Player	Years	National Soccer League	NSL Cup	Total
1	(Australia) Ken Boden	1978–1979	26 (52)	4 (8)	30 (60)
2	(Australia) Joe Senkalski	1978–1984	19 (119)	3 (7)	22 (126)
3	(England) Roy Drinkwater	1978–1982	19 (124)	2 (11)	21 (135)
3	(Australia) David Lowe	1982–1983	19 (52)	2 (2)	21 (54)
5	(England) Graham Heys	1979–1981	19 (73)	1 (5)	20 (78)
6	(Australia) Bob Mountford	1978; 1981; 1983	17 (65)	1 (4)	18 (69)
7	(England) David Jones	1979–1984	16 (113)	0 (4)	16 (117)
8	(England) Craig Mason	1978–1984	12 (142)	1 (10)	13 (152)
9	(Australia) Colin Curran	1979–1984	11 (103)	0 (11)	11 (114)
10	(Australia) Malcolm McClelland	1979–1984	9 (76)	0 (6)	9 (82)

== Club records ==
=== Matches ===
==== Firsts ====
- First National Soccer League match: Newcastle KB United 1–4 Sydney City, National Soccer League, 5 March 1978
- First NSL Cup match: Weston Bears 1–2 Newcastle KB United, First round, 17 May 1978

==== Record wins ====
- Record NSL win: 5–0 against Canberra City, 20 August 1983
- Record NSL Cup win:
  - 3–0 against Sydney Olympic, Second round, 19 May 1979
  - 3–0 against Edgeworth Eagles, First round, 25 April 1980

==== Record defeats ====
- Record NSL defeat:
  - 0–4 against Canberra City, 12 April 1980
  - 0–4 against Heidelberg United, 25 May 1980
  - 0–4 against Sydney City, 18 April 1982
- Record NSL Cup defeat:
  - 0–2 against Brisbane City, Semi-finals, 1 October 1978
  - 1–3 against Marconi Fairfield, Second round, 5 July 1980
  - 1–3 against Sydney Olympic, Second round, 4 April 1983

==== Record consecutive results ====
- Record consecutive wins: 4, from 23 April 1983 to 22 May 1983
- Record consecutive defeats:
  - 4, from 28 April 1979 to 3 June 1979
  - 4, from 19 April 1981 to 10 May 1981
- Record consecutive draws: 5, from 15 July 1979 to 12 August 1979
- Record consecutive matches without a defeat: 9, from 1 July 1979 to 25 August 1979
- Record consecutive league matches without a defeat: 10, from 12 August 1978 to 22 April 1979
- Record consecutive matches without a win: 9, from 21 March 1982 to 16 May 1982

=== Goals ===
- Most NSL goals scored in a season: 45 in 30 matches, 1983
- Fewest NSL goals scored in a season: 32 in 26 matches, 1980
- Most NSL goals conceded in a season: 52 in 30 matches, 1982
- Fewest NSL goals conceded in a season: 26 in 30 matches, 1983

=== Points ===
- Most points in a season: 49 in 30 matches, National Soccer League, 1983
- Fewest points in a season: 22 in 26 matches, National Soccer League, 1978

=== Attendances ===
- Highest attendance at Newcastle: 16,614, against Marconi Fairfield, National Soccer League, 27 August 1978
- Lowest attendance at Newcastle: 1,600, against APIA Leichhardt, National Soccer League, 5 March 1983
