= 1983 Newcastle KB United season =

Newcastle KB United
1983 season
- Manager: Ken Kaiser
- National Soccer League: 5th
- NSL Cup: Second round
- Top goalscorer: League: David Lowe (10); All: David Lowe (12)
- Highest home attendance: 4,950 vs. Sydney Olympic (4 June 1983); National Soccer League
- Lowest home attendance: 1,600 vs. APIA Leichhardt (5 March 1983); NSL Cup
- Average home league attendance: 2,871
- Biggest win: 5–0 vs. Canberra City (H) (20 August 1983); National Soccer League
- Biggest defeat: 0–2 vs. Marconi Fairfield (H) (29 June 1983); National Soccer League; 1–3 vs. Sydney Olympic (A) (4 April 1983); NSL Cup

The 1983 season was the sixth in the history of Newcastle KB United. It was also the sixth season in the National Soccer League. In addition to the domestic league, they also participated in the NSL Cup. Newcastle KB United finished 5th in their National Soccer League season, and were eliminated in the NSL Cup second round by Sydney Olympic.

== Players ==
Note: Flags indicate national team as defined under FIFA eligibility rules; some limited exceptions apply. Players may hold more than one non-FIFA nationality.

No.	Pos.	Nation	Player
1	GK	NZL	Clint Gosling
3	FW	AUS	Howard Tredinnick
4	MF	ENG	Craig Mason
5	DF	AUS	Peter Burke
6	DF	ENG	Gary Watson
7	MF	AUS	Joe Senkalski
8	FW	ENG	Bob Mountford
9	MF	AUS	David Lowe
10		AUS	David Jones
11	MF	ENG	Ian Buckley
12	FW	AUS	Simon Brandt

No.	Pos.	Nation	Player
13	DF	AUS	Ralph Maier
14	DF	AUS	Brett Cowburn
16	MF	AUS	Grant Lee
17	DF	AUS	Michael Boogaard
18	DF	AUS	Andy Stankovic
19	MF	AUS	Bernard Kerby
—	FW	AUS	Nigel Drysdale
—	MF	AUS	Tony Caban
—	FW	ENG	Mick Channon
—	GK	AUS	Robert Cox

== Competitions ==
=== Overview ===
Competition	First match	Last match	Starting round	Final position	Record							
Competition	First match	Last match	Starting round	Final position	Pld	W	D	L	GF	GA	GD	Win %
National Soccer League	13 March 1983	8 October 1983	Matchday 1	5th	30	14	7	9	45	26	+19	46.67
NSL Cup	5 March 1983	4 April 1983	First round	Second round	2	1	0	1	3	3	+0	50.00
Total					32	15	7	10	48	29	+19	46.88

Last updated: complete
Source: Competitions

=== National Soccer League ===
==== League table ====
Pos	Team	Pld	W	D	L	GF	GA	GD	Pts
1	St George-Budapest (C)	30	15	10	5	47	27	+20	55
2	Sydney City	30	15	9	6	48	30	+18	54
3	Preston Makedonia	30	15	7	8	47	32	+15	52
4	South Melbourne	30	15	7	8	44	36	+8	52
5	Newcastle KB United	30	14	7	9	45	26	+19	49
6	Heidelberg United	30	11	10	9	39	38	+1	43
7	Sydney Olympic	30	12	5	13	38	36	+2	41
8	APIA Leichhardt	30	11	6	13	43	36	+7	39
9	Marconi Fairfield	30	9	11	10	43	41	+2	38
10	Canberra City	30	11	5	14	47	53	−6	38
11	Adelaide City	30	10	6	14	37	38	−1	36
12	Footscray JUST	30	9	9	12	25	42	−17	36
13	West Adelaide	30	7	12	11	25	37	−12	33
14	Brisbane City	30	8	9	13	33	50	−17	33
15	Wollongong City	30	4	15	11	41	55	−14	27
16	Brisbane Lions	30	6	8	16	36	61	−25	26

Updated to match(es) played on unknown. Source: rsssf.com
Rules for classification: 1) points; 2) goal difference; 3) number of goals scored.
(C) Champions

==== Results by round ====
Round	1	2	3	4	5	6	7	8	9	10	11	12	13	14	15	16	17	18	19	20	21	22	23	24	25	26	27	28	29	30
Ground	A	H	A	H	H	A	H	A	H	A	H	H	H	A	H	A	A	H	H	A	H	A	H	A	A	A	H	A	A	H
Result	L	D	W	D	W	L	W	W	W	W	W	D	L	L	W	L	W	L	W	W	L	L	W	D	W	D	D	W	D	L
Position	12	11	7	8	5	7	4	3	1	1	2	2	2	4	2	3	3	3	3	3	3	3	2	2	3	3	4	5	5	5

Source: worldfootball.net
A = Away; H = Home; W = Win; D = Draw; L = Loss

==== Matches ====
13 March 1983 1	St George-Budapest	1–0	Newcastle KB United	Sydney
	Wilson 85'	Report		Stadium: St George Stadium; Attendance: 2,150; Referee: Peter Rampley

19 March 1983 2	Newcastle KB United	1–1	Wollongong City	Newcastle
	Lowe 85'	Report	Cotton 62'	Stadium: Newcastle International Sports Centre; Attendance: 2,024; Referee: Arthur Owens

27 March 1983 3	Brisbane City	2–5	Newcastle KB United	Brisbane
	Mountford 65' (o.g.); Hamilton ?'	Report	Mountford ?', 37'; Jones 19'; Wilkinson 45' (o.g.); Lowe 63'	Stadium: Spencer Park; Attendance: 2,200; Referee: Alan Kibbler

2 April 1983 4	Newcastle KB United	1–1	Adelaide City	Newcastle
	Mountford 45'	Report	Rankin 12'	Stadium: Newcastle International Sports Centre; Attendance: 2,352; Referee: Ken Small

9 April 1983 5	Newcastle KB United	1–0	APIA Leichhardt	Newcastle
	Mountford 70'	Report		Stadium: Newcastle International Sports Centre; Attendance: 2,403; Referee: Tim Davies

17 April 1983 6	Preston Makedonia	1–0	Newcastle KB United	Melbourne
	Ward 67' (pen.)	Report		Stadium: B.T. Connor Reserve; Attendance: 3,000; Referee: Dennis Voutsinas

23 April 1983 7	Newcastle KB United	2–0	West Adelaide	Newcastle
	Cowburn 70'; Brandt 79'	Report		Stadium: Newcastle International Sports Centre; Attendance: 2,112; Referee: Jim Reeves

1 May 1983 8	South Melbourne	2–5	Newcastle KB United	Melbourne
	Egan 38'; Wooddin 59'	Report	Cowburn 19'; Lee 22'; Jones 42'; Lowe 79', 86'	Stadium: Middle Park; Attendance: 3,000; Referee: Jim Fearn

15 May 1983 10	Canberra City	0–1	Newcastle KB United	Canberra
		Report	Jones 46'	Stadium: Bruce Stadium; Attendance: 2,518; Referee: Glynn Davies

22 May 1983 11	Newcastle KB United	3–0	Brisbane Lions	Newcastle
	Boogaard 1' (pen.); Lee 19'; Mountford 23'	Report		Stadium: Newcastle International Sports Centre; Attendance: 3,467; Referee: Gary Power

4 June 1983 12	Newcastle KB United	0–0	Sydney Olympic	Newcastle
		Report		Stadium: Newcastle International Sports Centre; Attendance: 4,950; Referee: Jim Reeves

25 June 1983 15	Newcastle KB United	3–0	Footscray JUST	Newcastle
	Burke 2', 51'; Mason 11'	Report		Stadium: Adamstown Oval; Attendance: 3,200; Referee: Barry Wilkinson

29 June 1983 13	Newcastle KB United	0–2	Marconi Fairfield	Newcastle
		Report	Brown 17'; Jankovics 24'	Stadium: Speers Point Park; Attendance: 2,417; Referee: Jim Reeves

3 July 1983 16	APIA Leichhardt	3–2	Newcastle KB United	Sydney
	Morsello 13'; Bradley 63'; Bertogna 89'	Report	Burke 70'; Mason 88'	Stadium: Lambert Park; Referee: Richard Lorenc

10 July 1983 17	Adelaide City	0–1	Newcastle KB United	Adelaide
		Report	Mountford 72'	Stadium: Olympic Sports Field; Attendance: 950; Referee: Jim Rossis

16 July 1983 18	Newcastle KB United	0–1	Brisbane City	Newcastle
		Report	Glockner 87'	Stadium: Newcastle International Sports Centre; Attendance: 2,722; Referee: Rob Davies

23 July 1983 19	Newcastle KB United	2–1	Preston Makedonia	Newcastle
	Senkalski 32'; Mason 40'	Report	Lucchesi 29'	Stadium: Newcastle International Sports Centre; Attendance: 2,640; Referee: Tony Boskovic

31 July 1983 20	West Adelaide	1–4	Newcastle KB United	Adelaide
	Heys 1'	Report	Lowe 9', 89'; Caban 83'; Burke 90'	Stadium: Hindmarsh Stadium; Attendance: 1,100; Referee: Jim Rossis

6 August 1983 21	Newcastle KB United	0–1	South Melbourne	Newcastle
		Report	Crino 62'	Stadium: Adamstown Oval; Attendance: 3,451; Referee: Jim Reeves

14 August 1983 22	Sydney City	1–0	Newcastle KB United	Gosford
	Kosmina 2'	Report		Stadium: Grahame Park; Attendance: 3,121; Referee: Peter Rampley

20 August 1983 23	Newcastle KB United	5–0	Canberra City	Newcastle
	Mountford 34', 47'; Mason 41', 78'; Jones 70'	Report		Stadium: Adamstown Oval; Attendance: 2,340; Referee: Tim Davies

28 August 1983 24	Marconi Fairfield	1–1	Newcastle KB United	Sydney
	Brown 41'	Report	Kerby 31'	Stadium: Marconi Stadium; Attendance: 3,272; Referee: Doug Rennie

4 September 1983 25	Sydney Olympic	0–1	Newcastle KB United	Sydney
		Report	Jones 75'	Stadium: St George Stadium; Attendance: 3,500; Referee: Peter Rampley

11 September 1983 26	Footscray JUST	0–0	Newcastle KB United	Melbourne
		Report		Stadium: Schinler Reserve; Attendance: 1,000; Referee: Dennis Voutsinas

17 September 1983 27	Newcastle KB United	0–0	Heidelberg United	Newcastle
		Report		Stadium: Adamstown Oval; Attendance: 3,017; Referee: Richard Lorenc

25 September 1983 28	Brisbane Lions	1–2	Newcastle KB United	Brisbane
	Niven 57' (pen.)	Report	Senkalski 20', 45'	Stadium: Richlands Stadium; Attendance: 200; Referee: Bill Monteverde

2 October 1983 29	Wollongong City	2–2	Newcastle KB United	Wollongong
	Cotton 6'; Dunleavy 28'	Report	Lowe 70', 89'	Stadium: Wollongong Showground; Attendance: 1,000

8 October 1983 30	Newcastle KB United	1–2	St George-Budapest	Newcastle
	Lowe 51'	Report	Slater 58'; Wilkinson 60'	Stadium: Newcastle International Sports Centre; Attendance: 3,785; Referee: Doug Rennie

16 October 1983 9	Newcastle KB United	1–0	Sydney City	Newcastle
	Senkalski 36'	Report		Stadium: Newcastle International Sports Centre; Attendance: 2,200; Referee: Jim Fearn

23 October 1983 14	Heidelberg United	2–1	Newcastle KB United	Melbourne
	Selemidis 25'; Lea 56'	Report	Lowe 8'	Stadium: Olympic Village; Attendance: 2,500; Referee: Dennis Voutsinas

=== NSL Cup ===
5 March 1983 First round	Newcastle KB United	2–0	APIA Leichhardt	Newcastle
	Mason 35'; Lowe 73'	Report		Stadium: Newcastle International Sports Centre; Attendance: 1,600; Referee: Jim Reeves

4 April 1983 Second round	Sydney Olympic	3–1	Newcastle KB United	Sydney
	Koussas 62'; Paterson 70'; Raskopoulos 86' (pen.)	Report	Lowe 38'	Stadium: Pratten Park; Attendance: 2,500; Referee: Gary Power

== Statistics ==
=== Appearances and goals ===
Players with no appearances not included in the list.

No.	Pos.	Nat.	Name	National Soccer League		NSL Cup		Total	
No.	Pos.	Nat.	Name	Apps	Goals	Apps	Goals	Apps	Goals
1	GK	(New Zealand)	Clint Gosling	30	0	2	0	32	0
3	FW	(Australia)	Howard Tredinnick	30	0	2	0	32	0
4	MF	(England)	Craig Mason	28	5	2	1	30	6
5	DF	(Australia)	Peter Burke	29	4	2	0	31	4
6	DF	(England)	Gary Watson	29	0	2	0	31	0
7	MF	(Australia)	Joe Senkalski	22(7)	4	2	0	31	4
8	FW	(England)	Bob Mountford	29	8	2	0	31	8
9	MF	(Australia)	David Lowe	27	10	2	2	29	12
10		(Australia)	David Jones	28(1)	5	1	0	30	5
11	MF	(England)	Ian Buckley	2(3)	0	2	0	7	0
12	FW	(Australia)	Simon Brandt	4(1)	1	0(1)	0	6	1
13	DF	(Australia)	Ralph Maier	21(1)	0	2	0	24	0
14	DF	(Australia)	Brett Cowburn	11(7)	2	1	0	19	2
16	MF	(Australia)	Grant Lee	16	2	0	0	16	2
17	DF	(Australia)	Michael Boogaard	8(2)	1	0	0	10	1
19	MF	(Australia)	Bernard Kerby	6(1)	1	0	0	7	1
—	FW	(Australia)	Nigel Drysdale	2(1)	0	0(1)	0	4	0
—	MF	(Australia)	Tony Caban	2	1	0	0	2	1
—	FW	(England)	Mick Channon	6	0	0	0	6	0

=== Clean sheets ===
Rank	No.	Pos	Nat	Name	National Soccer League	NSL Cup	Total
1	1	GK	(Australia)	Clint Gosling	12	1	13
Total					12	1	13
