= 1984 Newcastle Rosebud United FC season =

Newcastle KB United Newcastle Rosebud United
1984 season
- Stadium: Newcastle International Sports Centre; Adamstown Oval; Marconi Stadium
- National Soccer League: 8th
- NSL Cup: Winners
- Top goalscorer: League: Simon Brandt (8); All: Derek Todd (12)
- Highest home attendance: 3,805 vs. Preston Makedonia (10 March 1984); National Soccer League
- Lowest home attendance: 350 vs. Green Gully (28 July 1984); National Soccer League
- Average home league attendance: 1,663
- Biggest win: 3–0 (3 times); 4–1 (once)
- Biggest defeat: 1–8 vs. Sydney City (9 May 1984); National Soccer League; 0–7 vs. South Melbourne (22 July 1984); National Soccer League

The 1984 season was the seventh and final season in the history of Newcastle KB United. It was also the seventh and final season in the National Soccer League. They were replaced by Newcastle Rosebud United (now Adamstown Rosebud) after Round 5 of the 1984 National Soccer League. Newcastle Rosebud United finished 8th in their National Soccer League season and won the NSL Cup Final against Melbourne Knights.

== Players ==
Note: Flags indicate national team as defined under FIFA eligibility rules; some limited exceptions apply. Players may hold more than one non-FIFA nationality.

No.	Pos.	Nation	Player
—	MF	AUS	Steve Allen
—	DF	AUS	Michael Boogaard
—	FW	AUS	Simon Brandt
—	DF	AUS	Peter Burke
—	MF	AUS	Tony Caban
—	MF	AUS	Glenn Cameron
—	DF	AUS	Brett Cowburn
—	GK	AUS	Robert Cox
—		AUS	Warren Davies
—	GK	AUS	Steve Dorman
—		AUS	Paul Gilligly
—	GK	NZL	Clint Gosling
—	MF	AUS	Bernard Kerby
—		AUS	Michael Hampton
—	DF	AUS	Warren Haslam
—	DF	AUS	Andrew Johns
—		AUS	David Jones

No.	Pos.	Nation	Player
—		AUS	Peter Jones
—	DF	AUS	Ralph Maier
—	MF	ENG	Craig Mason
—		AUS	Terry Mason
—	MF	AUS	Malcolm McClelland
—	MF	AUS	John McQuarrie
—	MF	AUS	Dean Milosevic
—	FW	AUS	Peter Morgan
—		AUS	Alan Owens
—	DF	AUS	Neil Owens
—		AUS	Neville Power
—	MF	AUS	Joe Senkalski
—	FW	NZL	Alf Stamp
—	DF	AUS	Andy Stankovic
—	DF	AUS	Andrew Thompson
—	FW	ENG	Derek Todd

== Competitions ==
=== Overview ===
Competition	First match	Last match	Starting round	Final position	Record							
Competition	First match	Last match	Starting round	Final position	Pld	W	D	L	GF	GA	GD	Win %
National Soccer League	4 March 1984	7 October 1984	Matchday 1	8th	28	11	4	13	35	52	−17	39.29
NSL Cup	23 May 1984	12 September 1984	Group stage	Winners	6	5	0	1	12	3	+9	83.33
Total					34	16	4	14	47	55	−8	47.06

Last updated: complete
Source: Competitions

=== National Soccer League ===
==== League table ====
Northern Conference

Pos	Team	Pld	W	D	L	GF	GA	GD	Pts	Qualification or relegation
1	Sydney City	28	17	8	3	67	21	+46	42	Qualification to Finals series
2	Sydney Olympic	28	16	8	4	61	27	+34	40	Qualification to Finals series
3	Marconi Fairfield	28	12	8	8	58	39	+19	32	Qualification to Finals series
4	APIA Leichhardt	28	12	8	8	43	35	+8	32	Qualification to Finals series
5	Blacktown City	28	12	6	10	43	48	−5	30	Qualification to Finals series
6	Sydney Croatia	28	8	11	9	32	38	−6	27	
7	Penrith City	28	8	10	10	29	41	−12	26	
8	Newcastle Rosebud United	28	11	4	13	35	52	−17	26	
9	Canberra Arrows	28	12	1	15	47	39	+8	25	
10	St George-Budapest	28	8	9	11	38	41	−3	25	
11	Melita Eagles (R)	28	8	8	12	23	38	−15	24	Relegation to the 1985 NSW State League
12	Wollongong City	28	5	5	18	22	59	−37	15	

Updated to match(es) played on unknown. Source: rsssf.com
Rules for classification: 1) points; 2) goal difference; 3) number of goals scored.
(R) Relegated

Southern Conference

Pos	Team	Pld	W	D	L	GF	GA	GD	Pts	Qualification
1	South Melbourne (C)	28	18	4	6	48	20	+28	40	Qualification to Finals series
2	Heidelberg United	28	14	7	7	37	27	+10	35	Qualification to Finals series
3	Melbourne Croatia	28	13	7	8	38	31	+7	33	Qualification to Finals series
4	Brisbane Lions	28	12	6	10	38	36	+2	30	Qualification to Finals series
5	Brunswick Juventus	28	13	4	11	36	42	−6	30	Qualification to Finals series
6	Preston Makedonia	28	11	6	11	42	33	+9	28	
7	Adelaide City	28	10	5	13	33	34	−1	25	
8	Footscray JUST	28	10	5	13	29	33	−4	25	
9	Green Gully	28	9	6	13	34	36	−2	24	
10	West Adelaide	28	8	5	15	40	52	−12	21	
11	Brisbane City	28	8	5	15	21	39	−18	21	
12	Sunshine George Cross	28	5	6	17	24	57	−33	16	

Updated to match(es) played on unknown. Source: rsssf.com
Rules for classification: 1) points; 2) goal difference; 3) number of goals scored.
(C) Champions

==== Results summary ====
Overall								Home						Away					
Pld	W	D	L	GF	GA	GD	Pts	W	D	L	GF	GA	GD	W	D	L	GF	GA	GD
28	11	4	13	35	52	−17	37	9	1	4	22	17	+5	2	3	9	13	35	−22

Source: worldfootball.net

==== Results by round ====
Round	1	2	3	4	5	6	7	8	9	10	11	12	13	14	15	16	17	18	19	20	21	22	23	24	25	26	27	28
Ground	A	H	H	A	H	A	A	H	A	A	H	A	H	A	H	A	A	H	H	A	H	A	A	H	H	A	H	H
Result	W	W	D	L	W	L	L	L	L	L	W	L	L	L	W	D	L	L	W	W	W	D	L	W	W	D	W	L
Position	2	1	1	2	2	6	8	9	11	11	10	11	11	11	11	11	11	11	11	10	9	9	11	11	11	11	6	8

Source: worldfootball.net
A = Away; H = Home; W = Win; D = Draw; L = Loss

==== Matches ====
4 March 1984 1	Penrith City	0–2	Newcastle KB United	Sydney
		Report	McQuarrie 40'; Brandt 90'	Stadium: Cook Park; Attendance: 1,500

10 March 1984 2	Newcastle KB United	1–0	Preston Makedonia	Newcastle
	Brandt 85'	Report		Stadium: Newcastle International Sports Centre; Attendance: 3,805; Referee: Terry Seacy

17 March 1984 3	Newcastle KB United	1–1	APIA Leichhardt	Newcastle
	Brandt 27'	Report	Bradley 55'	Stadium: Newcastle International Sports Centre; Attendance: 2,043; Referee: Richard Lorenc

24 March 1984 4	Marconi Fairfield	2–1	Newcastle KB United	Sydney
	Brown 34'; Lowe 52'	Report	Morgan 80'	Stadium: Marconi Stadium; Attendance: 1,742; Referee: Doug Rennie

31 March 1984 5	Newcastle KB United	3–0	Green Gully	Newcastle
	Brandt 51', 75'; Senkalski 87'	Report		Stadium: Newcastle International Sports Centre; Attendance: 1,903; Referee: Peter Rampley

15 April 1984 7	Brunswick Juventus	2–0	Newcastle Rosebud United	Melbourne
	Zinni 54'; Lloyd 56'	Report		Stadium: Olympic Park; Attendance: 2,000; Referee: Stewart Mellings

21 April 1984 8	Newcastle Rosebud United	1–5	Sydney Olympic	Newcastle
	Kerby 43'	Report	Patikas 7', 53'; Lambropoulos 30'; Koussas 57'; Theodorakopoulos 62'	Stadium: Adamstown Oval; Attendance: 1,500; Referee: Tim Davies

23 April 1984 9	Wollongong City	1–0	Newcastle Rosebud United	Wollongong
	Beggs 32'	Report		Stadium: Wollongong Showground; Attendance: 1,100; Referee: Richard Lorenc

4 May 1984 10	West Adelaide	4–1	Newcastle Rosebud United	Adelaide
	Malavazos 50', 77'; Konstandopoulos 64'; McGachey 86'	Report	Brandt 6'	Stadium: Hindmarsh Stadium; Attendance: 2,000; Referee: Tony Martell

9 May 1984 6	Sydney City	8–1	Newcastle Rosebud United	Sydney
	Fletcher 2', 38', 66'; Gomez 11'; Kosmina 18', 74', 81'; Kay 27'	Report	Kerby 54'	Stadium: St George Stadium; Attendance: 300; Referee: Ken Small

12 May 1984 11	Newcastle Rosebud United	3–0	Sunshine George Cross	Newcastle
	Richardson 13' (o.g.); Senkalski 65' (pen.); Todd 67'	Report		Stadium: Adamstown Oval; Attendance: 1,795; Referee: Jim Reeves

20 May 1984 12	Heidelberg United	2–1	Newcastle Rosebud United	Melbourne
	Valentine 47'; Patterson 87' (pen.)	Report	Todd 87' (pen.)	Stadium: Olympic Village; Attendance: 3,000; Referee: Bernie Upjohn

16 June 1984 15	Newcastle Rosebud United	1–0	Footscray JUST	Newcastle
	Brandt 71'	Report		Stadium: Adamstown Oval; Attendance: 1,368; Referee: Jim Reeves

23 June 1984 13	Newcastle Rosebud United	0–4	Canberra Arrows	Newcastle
		Report	Gibson 20' (pen.); Reis 22', 90'; Perinovic 88'	Stadium: Adamstown Oval; Attendance: 1,496; Referee: Rob Davies

1 July 1984 14	Canberra Arrows	2–1	Newcastle Rosebud United	Canberra
	Farina 23'; Bryant 37' (pen.)	Report	Todd 60'	Stadium: Bruce Stadium; Attendance: 1,607; Referee: Vince Celestino

15 July 1984 16	Brunswick Juventus	1–1	Newcastle Rosebud United	Melbourne
	Brown 62'	Report	Power 18'	Stadium: Olympic Park; Attendance: 808; Referee: Sam Zoumas

22 July 1984 17	South Melbourne	7–0	Newcastle Rosebud United	Melbourne
	Brown 17'; Egan 21', 48', 76', 85'; Davidson 40'; Blair 59'	Report		Stadium: Middle Park; Attendance: 2,500; Referee: Bernie Upjohn

28 July 1984 18	Newcastle Rosebud United	1–2	Green Gully	Newcastle
	Jones 64'	Report	Williams 19'; Lewis 69'	Stadium: Adamstown Oval; Attendance: 350; Referee: Terry Seacy

4 August 1984 19	Newcastle Rosebud United	2–1	Blacktown City	Newcastle
	Todd 48', 87'	Report	Dunleavy 64'	Stadium: Adamstown Oval; Attendance: 1,173; Referee: Jim Reeves

12 August 1984 20	Melita Eagles	1–3	Newcastle Rosebud United	Sydney
	Wilson 59'	Report	Power 22'; Todd 41'; Milosevic 90'	Stadium: Melita Stadium; Attendance: 684; Referee: Ken Small

18 August 1984 21	Newcastle Rosebud United	3–1	St George-Budapest	Newcastle
	Brandt 41'; Milosevic 64'; Senkalski 71' (pen.)	Report	Polias 82'	Stadium: Adamstown Oval; Attendance: 1,204; Referee: Rob Davies

26 August 1984 22	Melbourne Croatia	1–1	Newcastle Rosebud United	Melbourne
	Brogan 78' (pen.)	Report	Milosevic 78'	Stadium: Olympic Park; Attendance: 2,000; Referee: Evan Venios

2 September 1984 23	St George-Budapest	3–0	Newcastle Rosebud United	Sydney
	Marton 4', 46'; Koczka 19'	Report		Stadium: St George Stadium; Attendance: 815; Referee: Gary Power

8 September 1984 24	Newcastle Rosebud United	2–0	Adelaide City	Newcastle
	Jones 77'; Boogaard 89'	Report		Stadium: Adamstown Oval; Attendance: 1,260; Referee: Doug Rennie

15 September 1984 25	Newcastle Rosebud United	1–0	Penrith City	Newcastle
	Todd 77'	Report		Stadium: Adamstown Oval; Attendance: 1,635; Referee: Jim Reeves

23 September 1984 26	Sydney Croatia	1–1	Newcastle Rosebud United	Sydney
	Vidaic 45'	Report	Owens 37'	Stadium: Pratten Park; Attendance: 2,820; Referee: Doug Rennie

1 October 1984 27	Newcastle Rosebud United	2–1	Canberra Arrows	Newcastle
	Boogaard 41'; Allen 49'	Report	Sermanni 50'	Stadium: Adamstown Oval; Attendance: 1,784; Referee: Graham Warne

7 October 1984 28	Newcastle Rosebud United	1–2	Wollongong City	Newcastle
	McQuarrie 83'	Report	Fontana 10'; Kerr 80'	Stadium: Adamstown Oval; Attendance: 2,990; Referee: Rob Davies

=== NSL Cup ===
23 May 1984 Group stage	Newcastle Rosebud United	2–1	Wollongong City	Sydney
	Fontana 18' (o.g.); Senkalski 35' (pen.)	Report	Kotamindis 45'	Stadium: Marconi Stadium; Attendance: 979; Referee: Arthur Owens

27 May 1984 Group stage	APIA Leichhardt	1–0	Newcastle Rosebud United	Sydney
	Genovese 84'	Report		Stadium: St George Stadium; Attendance: 500; Referee: Gary Power

3 June 1984 Group stage	Newcastle Rosebud United	4–1	St George-Budapest	Newcastle
	Todd 2', 49'; Maier 52'; Boogaard 84'	Report	Barton 34'	Stadium: Adamstown Oval; Attendance: 1,638; Referee: Jim Reeves

11 June 1984 Quarter-finals	Newcastle Rosebud United	3–0	Sydney City	Newcastle
	Milosevic 75', 88'; Boogaard 79'	Report		Stadium: Adamstown Oval; Attendance: 1,350; Referee: Rob Davies

29 August 1984 Semi-finals	APIA Leichhardt	0–2	Newcastle Rosebud United	Sydney
		Report	Todd 4'; Senkalski 42'	Stadium: St George Stadium; Attendance: 500; Referee: Tim Davies

12 September 1984 Final	Melbourne Croatia	0–1	Newcastle Rosebud United	Melbourne
		Report	Todd 29'	Stadium: Olympic Park; Attendance: 4,000; Referee: Stewart Mellings

== Statistics ==
=== Appearances and goals ===
Players with no appearances not included in the list.

No.	Pos.	Nat.	Name	National Soccer League		NSL Cup		Total	
No.	Pos.	Nat.	Name	Apps	Goals	Apps	Goals	Apps	Goals
—	MF	(Australia)	Steve Allen	7(3)	1	1(1)	0	12	1
—	DF	(Australia)	Michael Boogaard	21(2)	2	6	2	29	4
—	FW	(Australia)	Simon Brandt	28	8	6	0	34	8
—	MF	(Australia)	Tony Caban	4(1)	0	0	0	5	0
—	MF	(Australia)	Glenn Cameron	0(1)	0	0	0	1	0
—	DF	(Australia)	Brett Cowburn	3	0	0	0	3	0
—	GK	(Australia)	Robert Cox	5	0	0	0	5	0
—		(Australia)	Warren Davies	7	0	0	0	7	0
—	GK	(Australia)	Steve Dorman	1	0	1	0	2	0
—		(Australia)	Paul Gilligly	1	0	0	0	1	0
—	GK	(New Zealand)	Clint Gosling	20	0	5	0	25	0
—	MF	(Australia)	Bernard Kerby	19(3)	2	4	0	26	2
—		(Australia)	Michael Hampton	2	0	0	0	2	0
—	DF	(Australia)	Warren Haslem	4(1)	0	0	0	5	0
—	DF	(Australia)	Andrew Johns	4	1	0	0	4	1
—		(Australia)	David Jones	19	1	5(1)	0	25	1
—		(Australia)	Peter Jones	1	0	0	0	1	0
—	DF	(Australia)	Ralph Maier	28	0	6	1	34	1
—	MF	(England)	Craig Mason	5	0	0	0	5	0
—		(Australia)	Terry Mason	1	0	0	0	1	0
—	MF	(Australia)	Malcolm McClelland	5	0	0	0	5	0
—	MF	(Australia)	John McQuarrie	19(2)	2	2	0	23	2
—	MF	(Australia)	Dean Milosevic	18(3)	3	6	2	27	5
—	FW	(Australia)	Peter Morgan	0(4)	1	0	0	4	1
—		(Australia)	Alan Owens	0	0	0	0	1	0
—	DF	(Australia)	Neil Owens	10	1	2	0	12	1
—		(Australia)	Neville Power	11(1)	2	4	0	16	2
—	MF	(Australia)	Joe Senkalski	26	3	6	3	32	6
—	FW	(New Zealand)	Alf Stamp	0(2)	0	0	0	2	0
—	DF	(Australia)	Andy Stankovic	0(1)	0	0	0	1	0
—	DF	(Australia)	Andrew Thompson	16	0	6	0	22	0
—	FW	(England)	Derek Todd	17(1)	7	6	5	24	12
Player(s) transferred out but featured this season
—	DF	(Australia)	Peter Burke	5	0	0	0	5	0

=== Clean sheets ===
Rank	No.	Pos	Nat	Name	National Soccer League	NSL Cup	Total
1	—	GK	(Australia)	Clint Gosling	7	2	9
2	—	GK	(Australia)	Steve Dorman	0	1	1
Total					7	3	10
