= 1983 National Soccer League =

Australian soccer season

National Soccer League
- Season: 1983
- Dates: 13 March – 9 October 1983
- Champions: St George-Budapest; 1st title
- Matches: 240
- Goals: 638 (2.66 per match)
- Top goalscorer: Duggie Brown (16 goals)
- Highest scoring: APIA Leichhardt 7–2 Brisbane Lions (5 June 1983)
- Highest attendance: 16,000; South Melbourne 1–1 Heidelberg United (3 April 1983)
- Lowest attendance: 150; Brisbane Lions 2–1 Canberra City (2 October 1983)
- Total attendance: 637,373
- Average attendance: 2,656

The 1983 National Soccer League was the seventh season of the National Soccer League, the former top-flight league in Australia. It began on 13 March 1983, and ended on 9 October 1983. St George-Budapest won the championship for the first time.

== Changes from 1982 ==
For this season, the league shifted wins to be worth three points instead of two. No post-season finals series were played during this season for the first time since the 1977 season.

== Teams ==
Sixteen teams competed in the league.

=== Stadiums and locations ===
Note: Table lists in alphabetical order.

Team	Location	Stadium	Capacity
Adelaide City	Adelaide (Norwood)	Olympic Sports Field	8,000
APIA Leichhardt	Sydney (Leichhardt)	Lambert Park	7,000
Brisbane City	Brisbane (Newmarket)	Spencer Park	5,000
Brisbane Lions	Brisbane (Inala)	Lions Stadium	5,000
Canberra City	Canberra	Canberra Stadium	25,011
Footscray JUST	Melbourne (Preston)	Schintler Reserve	?
Heidelberg United	Melbourne (Collingwood)	Olympic Village	12,000
Marconi Fairfield	Sydney (Smithfield)	Marconi Stadium	9,000
Newcastle KB United	Newcastle	Newcastle International Sports Centre	30,000
Preston Makedonia	Melbourne (Fitzroy)	B.T. Connor Reserve	4,000
South Melbourne	Melbourne (St Kilda West)	Middle Park	18,000
St George-Budapest	Sydney (Mortdale)	St George Stadium	12,000
Sydney City	Sydney (Bondi)	ES Marks Athletics Field	8,000
Sydney Olympic	Sydney (Waterloo)	Pratten Park	15,000
West Adelaide	Adelaide (City of Adelaide)	Hindmarsh Stadium	16,500
Wollongong City	Wollongong	Wollongong Showground	22,000

== League table ==
Pos	Team	Pld	W	D	L	GF	GA	GD	Pts
1	St George-Budapest (C)	30	15	10	5	47	27	+20	55
2	Sydney City	30	15	9	6	48	30	+18	54
3	Preston Makedonia	30	15	7	8	47	32	+15	52
4	South Melbourne	30	15	7	8	44	36	+8	52
5	Newcastle KB United	30	14	7	9	45	26	+19	49
6	Heidelberg United	30	11	10	9	39	38	+1	43
7	Sydney Olympic	30	12	5	13	38	36	+2	41
8	APIA Leichhardt	30	11	6	13	43	36	+7	39
9	Marconi Fairfield	30	9	11	10	43	41	+2	38
10	Canberra City	30	11	5	14	47	53	−6	38
11	Adelaide City	30	10	6	14	37	38	−1	36
12	Footscray JUST	30	9	9	12	25	42	−17	36
13	West Adelaide	30	7	12	11	25	37	−12	33
14	Brisbane City	30	8	9	13	33	50	−17	33
15	Wollongong City	30	4	15	11	41	55	−14	27
16	Brisbane Lions	30	6	8	16	36	61	−25	26

Updated to match(es) played on unknown. Source: rsssf.com
Rules for classification: 1) points; 2) goal difference; 3) number of goals scored.
(C) Champions

== Results ==
Home \ Away	ADE	API	BRC	BRL	CAN	FOO	HEI	MAR	NKU	PRE	SOU	STG	SYC	SYO	WES	WOL
Adelaide City	—	1–2	2–0	2–1	2–2	3–0	2–4	1–0	0–1	0–1	1–0	1–0	1–1	1–2	2–0	2–2
APIA Leichhardt	2–0	—	0–1	7–2	2–1	2–0	2–3	2–0	3–2	0–0	0–0	1–0	0–0	0–2	3–0	4–1
Brisbane City	2–0	3–2	—	0–0	2–3	0–1	2–2	1–1	2–5	3–1	2–0	2–4	1–1	0–3	0–0	0–2
Brisbane Lions	0–4	1–1	4–0	—	2–1	5–0	3–1	2–0	1–2	1–3	2–2	0–3	0–2	2–1	2–2	1–2
Canberra City	2–1	1–0	2–0	6–1	—	1–0	3–0	2–2	0–1	0–1	1–2	3–3	2–5	1–1	2–1	3–1
Footscray JUST	1–1	1–1	1–1	2–1	1–0	—	0–0	0–4	0–0	1–4	1–4	0–1	2–1	2–1	2–0	3–1
Heidelberg United	0–1	2–0	2–1	2–0	3–1	0–0	—	0–1	2–1	3–1	2–3	1–4	1–0	4–1	1–1	2–0
Marconi Fairfield	3–2	1–3	0–0	1–1	2–1	0–1	2–0	—	1–1	3–1	1–1	4–0	1–1	0–2	1–3	5–4
Newcastle KB United	1–1	1–0	0–1	3–0	5–0	3–0	0–0	0–2	—	2–1	0–1	1–2	1–0	0–0	2–0	1–1
Preston Makedonia	2–1	2–1	4–0	5–0	2–0	2–1	0–0	3–2	1–0	—	0–4	1–1	4–0	0–1	3–0	3–2
South Melbourne	2–1	1–0	3–1	2–1	1–2	1–1	1–1	2–1	2–5	0–0	—	0–2	3–2	3–0	1–0	0–1
St George-Budapest	1–1	2–1	4–0	1–1	2–1	2–1	1–1	2–2	1–0	1–2	2–0	—	1–2	1–0	0–0	4–0
Sydney City	1–0	2–0	2–2	3–0	3–0	1–1	2–0	2–0	1–0	3–0	3–0	0–0	—	2–1	0–0	3–1
Sydney Olympic	1–0	2–1	0–3	0–0	3–1	0–1	3–0	2–2	0–1	1–0	0–2	1–2	5–1	—	0–1	3–3
West Adelaide	1–2	3–2	0–1	2–1	2–2	1–0	2–2	0–0	1–4	0–0	0–1	1–0	1–1	1–0	—	1–1
Wollongong City	3–1	1–1	1–1	1–1	2–3	1–1	0–0	1–1	2–2	1–1	2–2	0–0	2–3	1–2	1–1	—

Source: OzFootball
Legend: Blue = home team win; Yellow = draw; Red = away team win.

== Awards ==
Award	Winner	Club
National Soccer League Player of the Year	(Australia) Joe Watson	Sydney City
National Soccer League Under 21 Player of the Year	(Australia) Oscar Crino	South Melbourne
National Soccer League Coach of the Year	(Australia) Frank Arok	St George-Budapest
