= Stuart Robertson (footballer, born 1959) =

Scottish footballer

Personal information
- Full name: Stuart Robertson
- Date of birth: 29 September 1959 (age 67)
- Place of birth: Glasgow, Scotland
- Height: 5 ft 4 in (1.63 m)
- Position: Midfielder

Senior career*
Years	Team	Apps	(Gls)
1978–1982	Burnley	32	(0)
1982	Exeter City	6	(0)
1982–1983	Doncaster Rovers	25	(0)
1983–1985	Dumbarton	49	(5)
1985–1987	Falkirk	22	(0)
1986–1987	→ Brechin City (loan)	4	(0)
1987–1988	Queen of the South	27	(2)
1988–1989	Dumbarton	27	(2)
1989–1993	Stirling Albion	103	(4)
1993	Ayr United	6	(0)
1993–1994	East Stirlingshire	18	(1)
1994–1996	Pollok	?	(?)
1996–1997	Albion Rovers	1	(0)
- * Club domestic league appearances and goals

Stuart Robertson (born 29 September 1959) is a Scottish former professional footballer who played as a midfielder. During his 21-season career, he played for a number of teams in the English Football League and the Scottish Football League.
