= Bill Summerscales =

English footballer

Personal information
- Full name: William Charles Summerscales
- Date of birth: 4 January 1949 (age 77)
- Place of birth: Willesden, London, England
- Height: 6 ft 2 in (1.88 m)
- Position: Central defender

Youth career
- North Staff's College of Tech'

Senior career*
Years	Team	Apps	(Gls)
196?–1970	Leek Town		
1970–1975	Port Vale	129	(4)
1975–1977	Rochdale	87	(4)
1977–1978	Stafford Rangers		
1978–1980	Newcastle KB United	54	(5)
- Marquis
Total		270	(13)
- * Club domestic league appearances and goals

William Charles Summerscales (born 4 January 1949) is an English former footballer who played in central defence for Leek Town, Rochdale, Stafford Rangers, and Newcastle KB United (Australia). He helped Port Vale to win promotion out of the Fourth Division in 1969–70.

== Career ==
Summerscales played for North Staffordshire College of Technology and Leek Town before joining Port Vale for a £400 fee in February 1970. He played four times in the Fourth Division in the 1969–70 promotion campaign. He played seven Third Division games in the 1970–71 season and scored his first senior goal on 19 December, in a 3–0 win over Rochdale at Spotland. He went on to score one goal (against Wrexham) in 28 games in the 1971–72 campaign. He scored three goals in 50 matches in the 1972–73 campaign, including Vale's consolation goal in a 3–1 defeat to Newcastle United in the League Cup. He came second to Ray Williams in that year's vote for the Port Vale Player of the Year award.

He scored once in 27 games in the 1973–74 season, before his run in the first-team was brought abruptly to a halt on 12 January 1974, when he broke his neck during a 2–2 draw with York City at Vale Park. After he returned to fitness, he had a new manager, as Gordon Lee left the club, and "Valiants" legend Roy Sproson took his place at Vale Park. Summerscales featured 29 times in the 1974–75 season and was dropped from the first-team in March 1975 before he was given a free transfer two months later. He moved on to Walter Joyce's Rochdale and helped the "Dale" to finish 15th in the Fourth Division in 1975–76, and then 18th in 1976–77 under the stewardship of Brian Green. Summerscales scored four goals in 87 league games during his two seasons at Spotland. He then played in the Northern Premier League for Stafford Rangers before moving to Australia to join National Soccer League side Newcastle KB United; he later returned to England with Marquis.

== Later life ==
Once he retired from the field, Summerscales became the under-15 coach at Stoke City and a committee member at Redgate United. He founded grocery company Morning Fresh in 1980 and moved into wholesaling five years later, ending the decade with four retail shops.

== Career statistics ==
Appearances and goals by club, season and competition
Club	Season	League			FA Cup		League Cup		Total	
Club	Season	Division	Apps	Goals	Apps	Goals	Apps	Goals	Apps	Goals
Port Vale	1969–70	Fourth Division	4	0	0	0	0	0	4	0
Port Vale	1970–71	Third Division	7	1	0	0	0	0	7	1
Port Vale	1971–72	Third Division	24	1	4	0	0	0	28	1
Port Vale	1972–73	Third Division	45	2	3	0	2	1	50	3
Port Vale	1973–74	Third Division	22	0	4	1	1	0	27	1
Port Vale	1974–75	Third Division	27	0	1	0	1	0	29	0
Port Vale	Total		129	4	12	1	4	1	145	6
Rochdale	1975–76	Fourth Division	43	2	6	0	2	0	51	2
Rochdale	1976–77	Fourth Division	44	2	3	0	2	0	49	2
Rochdale	Total		87	4	9	0	4	0	100	4
Newcastle KB United	1978	National Soccer League	26	2	—		—		26	2
Newcastle KB United	1979	National Soccer League	20	3	—		—		20	3
Newcastle KB United	1980	National Soccer League	8	0	—		—		8	0
Newcastle KB United	Total		54	5	0	0	0	0	54	5
Career total			270	13	21	1	8	1	299	15

== Honours ==
Port Vale

- Football League Fourth Division fourth-place promotion: 1969–70
