= Peter Tredinnick =

Australian soccer player

Personal information
- Date of birth: 6 January 1960 (age 66)
- Positions: Left midfielder; left winger

Senior career*
Years	Team	Apps	(Gls)
1978–1980	Newcastle KB United	60	(2)
1981–1982	Wollongong Wolves	52	(6)
1983–1984	APIA Leichhardt	57	(7)
1985–1986	Marconi Fairfield	47	(4)
1987–1988	APIA Leichhardt	41	(2)
1989	Heidelberg United	15	(1)
Total		272	(21)

International career
1983	Australia	3	(0)
- * Club domestic league appearances and goals

Peter Tredinnick (born 6 January 1960) is an Australian former soccer player who played as a left midfielder and left winger. He played in the National Soccer League (NSL) for over a decade and represented the Australia national team. His younger brother Howard also represented Australia.

== Early life ==
Tredinnick spent time as a child in Guyra where his father Alan was working as a teacher. He later moved to Newcastle where he attended Booragul High School, alongside future teammates Brett Cowburn and Craig Johnston.

== Club career ==
Tredinnick began playing soccer at Guyra. He later played at Lake Macquarie where he played with fellow Booragul High School scholar Craig Johnston. He played senior football for Lake Macquarie at the age of 15. Tredinnick represented Northern New South Wales Schoolboys in 1976 and 1977.

Tredinnick began his NSL career with Newcastle KB United in 1978. He played for several clubs throughout his career, including Wollongong Wolves, APIA Leichhardt, Marconi Fairfield, and Heidelberg United. Over 12 seasons, he made 272 league appearances and scored 21 goals.

== International career ==
Tredinnick represented Australia at both youth and senior levels. He earned three caps for the Socceroos in 1983, featuring in matches against China, Thailand, and Singapore in the Merlion Cup.

== Post-playing career ==
After retiring from professional soccer, Tredinnick pursued a career in law and became a partner at the national law firm Moray & Agnew. In October 2012, he was appointed as a director of Football Federation Australia (FFA). During his tenure, he served on the FFA Board's Football Development Committee and the Board Nominations Committee. He stepped down from the FFA Board in August 2015 for personal reasons.
