= Alf Stamp =

New Zealand footballer

Personal information
- Full name: Alfred J. Stamp
- Place of birth: Scotland
- Position: Winger

Senior career*
| Years | Team | Apps | (Gls) |
| 1968–1971 | Anniesland | | |
| 1971–1972 | Queen's Park | 13 | (4) |
| 1972–1973 | Eastern Suburbs | | |
| 1973–1975 | Partick Thistle | 0 | (0) |
| 1975–1980 | Eastern Suburbs | | |
| 1981–1984 | Newcastle KB United | 33 | (5) |

International career
| 1979 | New Zealand | 4 | (0) |
- * Club domestic league appearances and goals

Alf Stamp is a former football (soccer) player who represented New Zealand at international level.

Stamp played four official full internationals for New Zealand in June and July 1979, making his debut as a substitute in a 0–1 loss to Australia on 13 June. He played two games against Fiji before gaining his final cap, also as a substitute in a 2–0 win over Australia on 23 July.

== Honours ==
Individual

- New Zealand Footballer of the Year: 1977
