= Arno Bertogna =

Australian soccer player

Personal information
- Full name: Arno Bertogna
- Date of birth: 9 April 1959 (age 67)
- Place of birth: Perth, Western Australia
- Position: Midfielder

Senior career*
Years	Team	Apps	(Gls)
1976–1977	Perth Azzurri	?	(?)
1978	Perth Azzurri	?	(?)
1978–1979	Sheffield United	?	(?)
1979–1981	Newcastle KB United	?	(?)
1981–1983	Wollongong Wolves	?	(?)
1983–1989	A.P.I.A. Leichhardt	132	(9)

International career^{‡}
1979–1983	Australia	4	(1)
- * Club domestic league appearances and goals ‡ National team caps and goals as of 14 July 2011

Arno Bertogna (born 9 April 1959 in Perth, Western Australia) is an Australian former association football player.

== Playing career ==
=== Club career ===
Bertogna began his senior career with Azzurri in the WA State League, winning the league and cup in his first year.

After two seasons with Azzurri he was given the opportunity of a trial at German first division side Eintracht Frankfurt, but found no further consideration there. After a stint back at Azzurri he left again for a trial with Sheffield United.

On his return to Australia he was signed to Newcastle KB United. He later joined Wollongong City before finally settling at APIA. Playing with APIA he made 132 appearances in the National Soccer League over six seasons. In 1988 at the age of 29 he stepped away from the professional game.

=== International career ===
Bertogna made his full international debut for Australia against Chinese Taipei in Taipei in November 1979. Playing three further matches for the Socceroos, he played his last game against Greece in Athens in November 1980.

He also played nine times in Socceroos B internationals.

== Honours ==
=== Club ===
Azzurri

- WA State League First Division Championship: 1976
- WA State League Top Four Cup: 1976

=== Country ===
Australia national association football team

- OFC Nations Cup: 1980
