= Clint Gosling =

English-born New Zealand footballer

Personal information
- Date of birth: 1 May 1960 (age 66)
- Place of birth: Liverpool, England
- Position: Goalkeeper

Senior career*
Years	Team	Apps	(Gls)
1978–1979	Eastern Suburbs	16	(0)
1980	Mount Wellington	2	(0)
1981–1986	Newcastle KB/Rosebud		
1987	Sydney City Hakoah		
1987	Melita Eagles		
1988–1993	Sydney Olympic	89	(0)
1993–1994	Newcastle Breakers	26	(0)

International career
1984–1993	New Zealand	39	(0)
- * Club domestic league appearances and goals

Clint Gosling (born 1 May 1960) is a former association football goalkeeper who represented New Zealand at international level.

Raised in Auckland, Gosling played his junior football at Lynndale AFC, which later merged with Avondale United to become Lynn-Avon United, and represented Auckland and New Zealand at various junior age group levels.

His senior career began with Eastern Suburbs and Mount Wellington before he moved to Australia to join Newcastle KB UnitedNewcastle Rosebud and later Sydney Olympic in the Australian National Soccer League

Gosling made his full New Zealand début in a 1–1 draw with Fiji on 20 October 1984. He played a total of 66 times for his country including unofficial matches, 39 or which were A-internationals. Gosling gained his final cap in a 0–3 loss to Australia on 6 June 1993.

Following his playing career, Gosling remained at Newcastle United Jets as goalkeeping coach until being dismissed by the club in November 2011. He continues as goalkeeping coach on a part-time basis for the New Zealand national teams at all levels.
