= Ken Boden =

Footballer (born 1950)

Personal information
- Date of birth: 5 July 1950 (age 76)
- Place of birth: Thrybergh, England
- Position: Midfielder

Senior career*
Years	Team	Apps	(Gls)
	Hull City	0	(0)
	Scunthorpe United	0	(0)
	Sheffield United	0	(0)
- Matlock Town
- Bridlington Trinity
1976–1977	Doncaster Rovers	1	(0)
1978–1979	Newcastle KB United	52	(26)
1980–1984	Sydney City	83	(37)
1984	Sydney Croatia	15	(2)
Total		151	(65)

International career
1979–1981	Australia	13	(2)
- * Club domestic league appearances and goals

Ken Boden (born 5 July 1950) is a former professional footballer who played as a midfielder. Born in England, he represented Australia.

== Club career ==
Boden spent his early career with Hull City, Scunthorpe United, Sheffield United, Matlock Town and Bridlington Trinity. He then spent the 1976–77 season with Doncaster Rovers, making one appearance in the Football League. Boden later moved to Australia, where he played for Newcastle KB United, Sydney City, and Sydney Croatia. During the 1978 season, he was the National Soccer League top scorer and Player of the Year.

== International career ==
Boden made 26 appearances for Australia at all levels. He made 13 official A-matches, appearing in one FIFA World Cup qualifying match.
