= Phil Dando =

New Zealand footballer

Personal information
- Full name: Philip Dando
- Date of birth: 8 June 1952 (age 74)
- Place of birth: Liverpool, England
- Position: Goalkeeper

Senior career*
Years	Team	Apps	(Gls)
1969–1972	Liverpool	0	(0)
1970–1971	→ Barrow AFC (loan)	9	(0)
1971	→ Bury (loan)	0	(0)
1972–1977	Christchurch United	?	(0)
1977	Brisbane Lions	23	(0)
1978–1982	Newcastle KB United	113	(0)
1983–1988	Nelson United	?	(0)

International career
1973–1975	New Zealand	2	(0)
- * Club domestic league appearances and goals

Philip Dando (born 8 June 1952), is a former association football goalkeeper who represented New Zealand at international level.

== Club career ==
Dando signed for his hometown club Liverpool in September 1969, but found himself behind Scottish international Tommy Lawrence and the emerging Ray Clemence in the pecking order at Anfield. His only taste of English League football came during a loan-spell at Barrow A.F.C. in their penultimate season in the Football League. He played nine times from his debut in November 1970. In March 1971, Dando went on loan to Bury, spending the entire spell in the reserves. He returned to Anfield, before being released at the end of the 1971–72 season. He decided to try his luck elsewhere.

In 1972, he embarked on a successful career Down Under for the likes of New Zealand's Christchurch United and Nelson United, as well as several seasons in Australia's professional NSL for Brisbane Lions and Newcastle KB.

== International career ==
Dando played two official A-international matches for New Zealand, making his debut in a 0–0 draw with Iran on 12 August 1973, his second appearance some two years later in a 1–1 draw with Macao on 5 November 1975.
