= Colin Curran =

Australian soccer player

Personal information
- Full name: Colin John Curran
- Date of birth: 21 August 1947 (age 79)
- Place of birth: Newcastle, NSW, Australia
- Position: Defender

Youth career
- West Wallsend
- 1964–1965: Manchester United

Senior career*
Years	Team	Apps	(Gls)
- Maitland FC
1966–1970	Adamstown Rosebuds		
1971	Marconi		
1972	Adamstown Rosebuds		
1974	Western Suburbs SC		
1977	Western Suburbs SC	26	(2)
1978–1982	Newcastle KB United	103	(11)

International career
1970–1979	Australia	34	(1)
- * Club domestic league appearances and goals

Colin John Curran (born 21 August 1947) is an Australian former soccer defender.

== Club career ==
Curran played youth football for West Wallsend FC before a stint in England with Manchester United.

Curran began his senior career with Maitland in the Northern New South Wales State League before joining Adamstown Rosebud. He played for Marconi in the New South Wales State League in 1971 before returning to Adamstown the following year. He returned to Sydney, joining Western Suburbs in 1973. He was a member of the Western Suburbs team that played in the first year of the Australian National Soccer League.

Curran transferred from Western Suburbs to Newcastle KB United in 1978, citing a desire to play closer to his hometown Newcastle. He played until 1982.

== International career ==
He was a member of the Australian 1974 FIFA World Cup squad in West Germany and represented Australia 34 times between 1970 and 1979. He scored Australia's first World Cup goal, an own goal, against East Germany.
