= Canberra City FC =

Australian semi-professional football club

- Full name: Canberra City Football Club
- Nicknames: City, Arrows
- Founded: 1977
- Ground: Canberra Stadium, Bruce, Canberra, ACT
- Capacity: 25,011
- League: Capital League Division 3
| Home colours | Away colours |

Canberra City Football Club, also known for some time as the Canberra Arrows, is a semi-professional soccer club based in Canberra in the Australian Capital Territory (ACT). It currently participates in the Capital Footballs Division One competition and competed in the National Soccer League from 1977 to 1986.

== National Soccer League ==
Chart of yearly table positions for Canberra City in NSL

Canberra City entered the new national competition for the inaugural season in 1977 as the only team representing the ACT. In its first season, home games were played at Manuka Oval which had the honour of hosting the first ever NSL match when City were defeated 3-1 by West Adelaide SC in front of a crowd of 1,550. In 1978 the club moved to the newly constructed Bruce Stadium. Canberra remained competitive throughout its tenure in the league, but had limited success being unable to reach the finals series in any season. The most successful seasons were in 1981 with a fifth-placed finish, and in 1985 finishing sixth in the Northern Conference, missing out on the finals series on goal difference to St George. A restructure of the national league for the 1987 season saw Canberra relegated to the NSW State League.

Statistics by Season

| Season | Pld | W | D | L | GF | GA | Pts | Table Position | National League Cup |
|---|---|---|---|---|---|---|---|---|---|
| 1977 | 26 | 5 | 7 | 14 | 22 | 39 | 17 | 13th of 14 | Quarter final |
| 1978 | 26 | 5 | 10 | 11 | 28 | 41 | 20 | 13th of 14 | Semi final |
| 1979 | 26 | 6 | 8 | 12 | 25 | 41 | 20 | 12th of 14 | Semi final |
| 1980 | 26 | 7 | 7 | 12 | 34 | 33 | 21 | 10th of 14 | Quarter final |
| 1981 | 30 | 13 | 7 | 10 | 41 | 32 | 33 | 5th of 16 | First round |
| 1982 | 30 | 7 | 10 | 13 | 37 | 54 | 24 | 15th of 16 | Quarter final |
| 1983 | 30 | 11 | 5 | 14 | 47 | 53 | 38 | 10th of 16 | Quarter final |
| 1984 | 28 | 12 | 1 | 15 | 47 | 39 | 25 | 9th of 12 (Nth) | Group stage |
| 1985 | 22 | 8 | 6 | 8 | 33 | 35 | 22 | 6th of 12 (Nth) | Quarter final |
| 1986 | 22 | 5 | 6 | 11 | 21 | 27 | 16 | 10th of 12 (Nth) | Semi final |

(Pld)=Games Played, (W)=Wins, (D)=Draws, (L)=Losses, (GF)=Goals For, (GA)=Goals Against, (Pts)=Points, (Nth)=Northern Conference

== Back to the ACT Premier League ==
Canberra City dropped into the NSW State League Division One for the 1987 season, and finished runners-up to Wollongong Wolves FC, they also then lost the Finals Series 2-1 to the Wolves. The Wolves returned to the NSL, whilst City withdrew to join ACT football.

In the early 1990s Canberra City men achieved considerable Premiership success and more recently won the Federation Cup in 2005 under the coaching guidance of an ex player from the 1980s era, Steve Bryant. Also in 2005, Canberra City Premier League Women won just about everything on offer under the guidance of 2005 Women's Coach of the Year, Pat Mills. Canberra City has close links with one of Canberra's largest junior organisations the Gungahlin United FC.

After relegation from the National Premier Leagues Capital Football in 2014, Canberra City currently find themselves in the Capital Footballs Division One, the third level of football in the ACT.

== Notable players ==
Category:Canberra City FC players

- (Australia) Steve Hogg
- (Australia) Harry Williams (Australian soccer player)
- (Australia) Frank Farina
- (England) Ian Callaghan
- (Scotland) Jimmy Cant
- (Scotland) Ian Gibson (footballer, born February 1956)
- (Scotland) Ian Purdie
- (Scotland) Peter Marinello
- (Scotland) Tom Sermanni
- (New Zealand) Duncan Cole
- (New Zealand) Richard Wilson (footballer, born 1956)
- (England) Tony Henderson

== Notable managers ==
- (Australia) Johnny Warren
- (Australia) Pat Caggiano
- (Australia) Matt Moore
- (Scotland) George Murray
- (Australia) Nick Palagyi
- (Australia) / (Greece) Nick Tsakiris
