= Newcastle KB United =

- Full name: Newcastle KB United
- Nickname: KB
- Founded: 1977
- Dissolved: 1984
- Ground: International Sports Centre, Newcastle
- League: National Soccer League
Home colours	Away colours

Newcastle KB United are a defunct Australian association football club. They participated in the National Soccer League from 1978 until early in the 1984 season.

== History ==
Chart of yearly table positions for Newcastle KB United in NSL

The first Newcastle based team to play in a national league, Newcastle KB United was formed in 1977, but did not play until 1978 one year after the inception of the Philips Soccer League (NSL).

Newcastle KB United was sponsored by Tooths Breweries operating the Kent Brewery (hence the KB tag) and took the NSL by storm by setting new crowd attendance records on a regular basis. They drew some famous names to play guest matches with them with Bobby Charlton playing a game for the club in 1978, Paul Reaney joining in 1980 and Craig Johnston played once in 1978 and again in 1982.

While they often struggled to compete at the very top of the league Newcastle were regular mid table finishers and their only honour was in 1984 when they travelled to Melbourne Knights and won the national league cup 1–0, playing as the newly formed Newcastle Rosebud United. The goal was scored by Derek Todd.

KB United's NSL licence was taken over by Northern New South Wales State League club Adamstown Rosebuds in 1984 after the collapse of Newcastle KB United. Rosebuds renamed themselves Newcastle Rosebud United while they played in the NSL. They were excluded from the NSL at the end of the 1986 season when it was re-organised and returned to the NNSW League.

It would be another 5 years before Newcastle had another representative in the National Soccer League, this time via the newly formed Newcastle Breakers FC

== Colours and badge ==
Newcastle KB United played in traditional Newcastle colours of emerald, white and cinnamon but later changed to match the KB brand to their strip and played in predominantly yellow with a red and black trim.

== Stadium ==
Newcastle International Sports Centre now known as McDonald Jones Stadium, was the home ground of Newcastle KB United. It had a western stand and a circular playing area surrounded by a hill.

== Supporters ==
Newcastle KB United set many crowd records during their time in the NSL holding the record for the largest crowd to a domestic game in this country until the formation of the A-league. This record was 18,367 against Sydney Olympic in April 1979, a year when their average home crowd exceeded 10,000.

The local vocal support was known as "The Rowdies" and they created an atmosphere from deep in the Western grandstand in what was known as 'The Red Section'.

Year	Position	Cup	Ave Home Crowd
1978	11 (14)	3	8500
1979	6 (14)	3	10200
1980	6 (14)	9	6400
1981	10 (16)	29	5300
1982	12 (16)	9	4400
1983	5 (16)	5	2900
1984~	8 (12)	1	1700
1985~	12 (12)	3	1500
1986~	6 (12)	9	1800

~ NSL divided into 2 conferences with Newcastle Adamstown Rosebud in the Northern Conference.

== Honours ==
- Winner National Knockout Cup: 1984 (as Newcastle Rosebuds)

1982 Winner of Prime Minister's Cup in Canberra against Canberra City NSL team
