= 1978 Eastern Suburbs FC season =

Eastern Suburbs
1978 season
- Head Coach: Gerry Chaldi
- Stadium: Wentworth Park; Olympic Park; Sydney Sports Ground
- National Soccer League: 2nd
- NSL Cup: Quarter-finals
- Top goalscorer: League: Ernie Campbell (10); All: Ernie Campbell (10)
- Highest home attendance: 9,136 vs. Marconi Fairfield (17 September 1978); National Soccer League Finals
- Lowest home attendance: 1,010 vs. Brisbane Lions (12 March 1978); National Soccer League
- Average home league attendance: 3,385
- Biggest win: 5–0 vs. Sydney Olympic (H) (28 May 1978); National Soccer League
- Biggest defeat: 0–3 vs. South Melbourne (A) (29 July 1978); National Soccer League; 0–3 vs. Brisbane City (A) (24 September 1978); NSL Cup

The 1978 season was the second in the National Soccer League for Eastern Suburbs (now Hakoah Sydney City East Football Club). In addition to the domestic league, they also participated in the NSL Cup. Eastern Suburbs finished 2nd in their National Soccer League season, and were eliminated in the NSL Cup quarter-finals by Brisbane City

== Players ==
Note: Flags indicate national team as defined under FIFA eligibility rules; some limited exceptions apply. Players may hold more than one non-FIFA nationality.

No.	Pos.	Nation	Player
1	GK	AUS	Todd Clarke
2	DF	AUS	Kevin Mullen
3	DF	SCO	Eddie Thomson
4	DF	AUS	Steve O'Connor
5	DF	SCO	Henry Mowbray
6	MF	AUS	John Stevenson
7	MF	AUS	Joe Watson
8	MF	AUS	Murray Barnes
9	FW	AUS	Ernie Campbell
10	FW	ENG	Terry Smith
11	FW	BRA	Hilton Silva

No.	Pos.	Nation	Player
12	DF	ENG	Alan Kershaw
13	FW	SCO	Bobby McGuinness
14		ENG	Jeff Illingworth
15	MF	AUS	Bobby Smith
16		AUS	Simco Silva
17	FW	WAL	Mark Trenter
18	MF	AUS	Ian Souness
19	MF	BRA	Luis de Melo
20	GK	AUS	Tony Pezzano
—	DF	AUS	George Townsend

== Competitions ==
=== Overview ===
Competition	First match	Last match	Starting round	Final position	Record							
Competition	First match	Last match	Starting round	Final position	Pld	W	D	L	GF	GA	GD	Win %
National Soccer League	5 March 1978	27 August 1978	Matchday 1	2nd	26	15	5	6	49	27	+22	57.69
NSL Cup	31 May 1978	24 September 1978	First round	Quarter-finals	3	2	0	1	6	4	+2	66.67
Total					29	17	5	7	55	31	+24	58.62

Source: Competitions

=== National Soccer League ===
==== League table ====
Pos	Team	Pld	W	D	L	GF	GA	GD	Pts	Qualification
1	West Adelaide (C)	26	16	4	6	42	27	+15	36	Qualification to Finals series (Note: The Finals series was not considered the championship for the 1978 National Soccer League.)
2	Eastern Suburbs	26	15	5	6	49	27	+22	35	Qualification to Finals series
3	South Melbourne	26	12	8	6	45	30	+15	32	Qualification to Finals series
4	Marconi Fairfield	26	12	6	8	46	31	+15	30	Qualification to Finals series
5	Fitzroy United	26	9	8	9	39	39	0	26	

Source: rsssf.com
Rules for classification: 1) Points; 2) Goal difference; 3) Goals scored
(C) Champions

==== Results summary ====
Overall								Home						Away					
Pld	W	D	L	GF	GA	GD	Pts	W	D	L	GF	GA	GD	W	D	L	GF	GA	GD
26	15	5	6	49	27	+22	50	8	2	3	25	11	+14	7	3	3	24	16	+8

Source: worldfootball.net

==== Results by round ====
Round	1	2	4	3	5	6	7	8	9	10	11	12	13	14	15	16	17	19	20	21	22	18	23	24	25	26
Ground	A	H	A	H	A	H	H	A	H	A	H	A	H	A	H	A	H	A	A	H	A	H	H	A	H	A
Result	W	L	D	W	W	D	L	L	D	L	W	W	W	D	W	D	L	W	W	W	L	W	W	W	W	W
Position	1	5	4	4	2	4	4	4	4	7	5	3	3	3	3	3	4	3	3	2	3	3	3	2	2	2
Points	2	2	3	5	7	8	8	8	9	9	11	13	15	16	18	19	19	21	23	25	25	27	29	31	33	35

Source: worldfootball.net
A = Away; H = Home; W = Win; D = Draw; L = Loss

==== Matches ====
Win Draw Loss

5 March 1978 1	Newcastle KB United	1–4	Eastern Suburbs	Newcastle
15:00 AEST	Boden 78' (pen.)	Report	Watson 36'; Silva 62', 64'; Barnes 82'	Stadium: Newcastle International Sports Centre; Attendance: 15,067; Referee: Peter Rampley

12 March 1978 2	Eastern Suburbs	1–3	Brisbane Lions	Sydney
	Campbell 32'	Report	Hughes 59', 68', 75'	Stadium: Wentworth Park; Attendance: 1,010; Referee: Tim Davies

25 March 1978 4	Footscray JUST	1–1	Eastern Suburbs	Melbourne
	Ristovski 88'	Report	Stevenson 23' (pen.)	Stadium: Schintler Reserve; Attendance: 3,000; Referee: Ken Allen

27 March 1978 3	Eastern Suburbs	2–1	Fitzroy United	Melbourne
	Mullen 57'; Stevenson 77'	Report	Tront 79'	Stadium: Olympic Park; Attendance: 4,000; Referee: Dennis McDermott
Note: This home fixture for Eastern Suburbs was moved to Olympic Park in Melbourne by the NSL.

2 April 1978 5	Brisbane City	0–3	Eastern Suburbs	Brisbane
		Report	Stevenson 45'; Watson 55'; Tokesi 80' (o.g.)	Stadium: Perry Park; Attendance: 2,400; Referee: John Van Der Lynde

9 April 1978 6	Eastern Suburbs	0–0	Marconi Fairfield	Sydney
		Report		Stadium: Wentworth Park; Attendance: 3,598; Referee: Barry Wilkinson

16 April 1978 7	Eastern Suburbs	1–2	Adelaide City	Sydney
	Campbell 22'	Report	J. Nyskohus 6'; Northcote 67'	Stadium: Wentworth Park; Attendance: 1,283; Referee: Jim Reeves

23 April 1978 8	Western Suburbs	3–2	Eastern Suburbs	Sydney
	Harding 35'; C. Eaton 43'; Fisher 51'	Report	Campbell 78'; Silva 86'	Stadium: Marconi Oval; Attendance: 2,476; Referee: Henry Witschge

30 April 1978 9	Eastern Suburbs	0–0	South Melbourne	Sydney
		Report		Stadium: Wentworth Park; Attendance: 3,580; Referee: Tony Boskovic

7 May 1978 10	West Adelaide	3–2	Eastern Suburbs	Adelaide
	Bozanic 20'; O'Connor 53' (o.g.); McGregor 56'	Report	Barnes 22', 37'	Stadium: Hindmarsh Stadium; Attendance: 5,341; Referee: Tony Beazleigh

14 May 1978 11	Eastern Suburbs	3–0	Canberra City	Sydney
15:00 AEST	O'Connor 66'; Campbell 72'; Souness 89'	Report		Stadium: Wentworth Park; Attendance: 2,685; Referee: Peter Rampley

21 May 1978 12	St George-Budapest	1–3	Eastern Suburbs	Sydney
	Mendez 42'	Report	H. Silva 57'; Watson 65'; Trenter 90+3'	Stadium: St George Stadium; Attendance: 1,200; Referee: Brian Fowler

28 May 1978 13	Eastern Suburbs	5–0	Sydney Olympic	Sydney
	Watson 21', 46'; Trenter 42'; Silva 55'; D. Allan 85' (o.g.)	Report		Stadium: Wentworth Park; Attendance: 5,928; Referee: Tim Davies

4 June 1978 14	Brisbane Lions	1–1	Eastern Suburbs	Brisbane
	Thomson 2' (o.g.)	Report	Bennett 47' (o.g.)	Stadium: Perry Park; Attendance: 3,000; Referee: Bob Mee

11 June 1978 15	Eastern Suburbs	1–0	Newcastle KB United	Sydney
13:00 AEST	Campbell 16'	Report		Stadium: Wentworth Park; Attendance: 4,725; Referee: Richard Lorenc

18 June 1978 16	Fitzroy United	1–1	Eastern Suburbs	Melbourne
	Tansey 35'	Report	E. Campbell 77'	Stadium: Olympic Park; Attendance: 3,500; Referee: Dennis McDermott

25 June 1978 17	Eastern Suburbs	1–2	Footscray JUST	Sydney
	Trenter 89'	Report	Rujevic 55'; Lujic 71'	Stadium: Wentworth Park; Attendance: 2,458; Referee: Brian Fowler

9 July 1978 19	Marconi Fairfield	1–2	Eastern Suburbs	Sydney
	Ollerton 15'	Report	Stevenson 61' (pen.); Silva 76'	Stadium: Marconi Oval; Attendance: 5,731; Referee: Henry Witschge

16 July 1978 20	Adelaide City	0–1	Eastern Suburbs	Adelaide
		Report	Trenter 28'	Stadium: Olympic Sports Field; Attendance: 5,600; Referee: Chris Bambridge

23 July 1978 21	Eastern Suburbs	3–0	Western Suburbs	Sydney
	Souness 41'; Campbell 52'; Silva 80'	Report		Stadium: Wentworth Park; Attendance: 1,113; Referee: Richard Lorenc

29 July 1978 22	South Melbourne	3–0	Eastern Suburbs	Melbourne
	Evans 25'; Hagegmanouil 85' (pen.); Thomson 89' (o.g.)	Report		Stadium: Middle Park; Attendance: 7,000; Referee: Don Campbell

30 July 1978 18	Eastern Suburbs	2–0	Brisbane City	Sydney
	Campbell 54'; Souness 77'	Report		Stadium: Wentworth Park; Attendance: 1,023; Referee: Tim Davies

6 August 1978 23	Eastern Suburbs	2–1	West Adelaide	Sydney
	Smith 14'; Silva 36'	Report	Honeyman 2'	Stadium: Wentworth Park; Attendance: 4,102; Referee: Jack Readshaw

12 August 1978 24	Canberra City	1–2	Eastern Suburbs	Canberra
	Heywood 34'	Report	Thomson 16'; Smith 23'	Stadium: Bruce Stadium; Attendance: 3,311; Referee: Dave Nugent

20 August 1978 25	Eastern Suburbs	4–2	St George-Budapest	Sydney
	Grosse 22' (o.g.); Stevenson 26'; Smith 62', 82'	Report	Morgan 25'; O'Connor 46'	Stadium: Wentworth Park; Attendance: 2,747; Referee: Jim Reeves

27 August 1978 26	Sydney Olympic	0–2	Eastern Suburbs	Sydney
		Report	Smith 61'; Barnes 71'	Stadium: Wentworth Park; Attendance: 3,530; Referee: Chris Bambridge

==== Finals series ====
3 September 1978 Semi-finals	West Adelaide	2–3 (a.e.t.)	Eastern Suburbs	Adelaide
	Koulianos 12'; Reynolds 14'	Report	Souness 20'; Barnes 53'; Campbell 117'	Stadium: Hindmarsh Stadium; Attendance: 4,800; Referee: Tony Beazleigh

17 September 1978 Grand Final	Eastern Suburbs	4–2	Marconi Fairfield	Sydney
	Smith 25'; Watson 38'; Trenter 41'; Campbell 44'	Report	Ollerton 23'; Vieri 60'	Stadium: Sydney Sports Ground; Attendance: 9,136; Referee: Don Campbell

=== NSL Cup ===
Win Draw Loss

31 May 1978 First round	Southside Eagles	1–2	Eastern Suburbs	Brisbane
	Millman 37'	Report	Thomson 50'; Watson 83'	Stadium: Perry Park; Attendance: Referee: Dave Nugent

19 July 1978 Second round	Eastern Suburbs	4–0	Sydney Olympic	Sydney
	Souness 17'; Barnes 21'; Smith 25'	Report		Stadium: Wentworth Park; Attendance: 1,023; Referee: Tim Davies

24 September 1978 Quarter-finals	Brisbane City	3–0	Eastern Suburbs	Brisbane
	Caldwell 48' (pen.); Kelso 82', ?'	Report		Stadium: Perry Park; Attendance: 1,500; Referee: Stewart Mellings

== Statistics ==
=== Appearances and goals ===
Includes all competitions. Players with no appearances not included in the list.

No.	Pos.	Nat.	Player	National Soccer League		NSL Cup		Total	
No.	Pos.	Nat.	Player	Apps	Goals	Apps	Goals	Apps	Goals
1	GK	(Australia)	Todd Clarke	25	0	3	0	28	0
2	DF	(Australia)	Kevin Mullen	25	1	3	0	28	1
3	DF	(Scotland)	Eddie Thomson	24	1	3	1	27	2
4	DF	(Australia)	Steve O'Connor	27	1	3	0	30	1
5	DF	(Scotland)	Henry Mowbray	27	0	2	0	29	0
6	MF	(Australia)	John Stevenson	26	5	3	0	29	5
7	MF	(Australia)	Joe Watson	27	6	3	1	30	7
8	MF	(Australia)	Murray Barnes	24	5	3	1	27	6
9	FW	(Australia)	Ernie Campbell	21+4	10	2	0	27	10
10	FW	(England)	Terry Smith	9+4	6	1+2	2	16	8
11	FW	(Brazil)	Hilton Silva	28	8	3	0	31	8
12	DF	(England)	Alan Kershaw	2+2	0	0+1	0	5	0
13	FW	(Scotland)	Bobby McGuinness	1	0	0	0	1	0
14	—	(England)	Jeff Illingworth	2+1	0	0	0	3	0
15	MF	(Australia)	Bobby Smith	8+3	0	0+1	0	12	0
16	—	(Australia)	Simco Silva	3	0	0	0	3	0
17	FW	(Wales)	Mark Trenter	5+4	5	2+1	0	12	5
18	MF	(Australia)	Ian Souness	19	4	2	1	21	5
19	MF	(Brazil)	Luis de Melo	2	0	0	0	2	0
20	GK	(Australia)	Tony Pezzano	3	0	0	0	3	0
—	DF	(Australia)	George Townsend	0+1	0	0	0	1	0

=== Disciplinary record ===
Includes all competitions. The list is sorted by squad number when total cards are equal. Players with no cards not included in the list.

Rank	No.	Pos.	Nat.	Player	National Soccer League			NSL Cup			Total		
Rank	No.	Pos.	Nat.	Player	Yellow card	Second yellow card	Red card	Yellow card	Second yellow card	Red card	Yellow card	Second yellow card	Red card
1	9	FW	(Australia)	Ernie Campbell	3	0	1	0	0	0	3	0	1
2	3	DF	(Scotland)	Eddie Thomson	0	0	1	0	0	0	0	0	1
3	2	DF	(Australia)	Kevin Mullen	0	0	1	0	0	0	0	0	1
4	4	DF	(Australia)	Steve O'Connor	3	0	0	0	0	0	3	0	0
5	8	MF	(Australia)	Murray Barnes	2	0	0	0	0	0	2	0	0
5	11	FW	(Brazil)	Hilton Silva	2	0	0	0	0	0	2	0	0
5	17	FW	(Wales)	Mark Trenter	2	0	0	0	0	0	2	0	0
8	5	DF	(Scotland)	Henry Mowbray	1	0	0	0	0	0	1	0	0
8	6	MF	(Australia)	John Stevenson	1	0	0	0	0	0	1	0	0
8	10	FW	(England)	Terry Smith	1	0	0	0	0	0	1	0	0
8	12	DF	(England)	Alan Kershaw	1	0	0	0	0	0	1	0	0
8	15	MF	(Australia)	Bobby Smith	1	0	0	0	0	0	1	0	0
Total					22	0	2	0	0	0	22	0	2

=== Clean sheets ===
Includes all competitions. The list is sorted by squad number when total clean sheets are equal. Numbers in parentheses represent games where both goalkeepers participated and both kept a clean sheet; the number in parentheses is awarded to the goalkeeper who was substituted on, whilst a full clean sheet is awarded to the goalkeeper who was on the field at the start of play. Goalkeepers with no clean sheets not included in the list.

Rank	No.	Nat.	Goalkeeper	NSL	NSL Cup	Total
1	1	(Australia)	Todd Clarke	9	1	10
2	20	(Australia)	Tony Pezzano	1	0	1
Total				10	1	11
