= 1977 Eastern Suburbs FC season =

Eastern Suburbs
1977 season
- Manager: Gerry Chaldi
- Stadium: Sydney Sports Ground; Wentworth Park; Marconi Oval
- National Soccer League: 1st
- NSL Cup: First round
- Top goalscorer: League: Terry Smith (14); All: Terry Smith (14)
- Highest home attendance: 6,115 vs. Sydney Olympic (26 June 1977); National Soccer League
- Lowest home attendance: 750 vs. South Melbourne (15 May 1977); National Soccer League
- Average home league attendance: 2,724
- Biggest win: 6–1 vs. Adelaide City (H) (7 May 1977); National Soccer League
- Biggest defeat: 2–4 vs. Marconi Fairfield (H) (24 April 1977); National Soccer League

The 1977 season was the first in the National Soccer League for Eastern Suburbs (now Hakoah Sydney City East Football Club). In addition to the domestic league, they also participated in the inaugural NSL Cup. Eastern Suburbs won the inaugural National Soccer League on goal difference to Marconi Fairfield.

== Players ==
Note: Flags indicate national team as defined under FIFA eligibility rules; some limited exceptions apply. Players may hold more than one non-FIFA nationality.

No.	Pos.	Nation	Player
1	GK	AUS	Malcolm Haynes
2	DF	AUS	Kevin Mullen
3	DF	SCO	Eddie Thomson
4	DF	SCO	Alex Robertson
5	DF	SCO	Harry Mowbray
6	MF	AUS	John Stevenson
7	MF	AUS	Murray Barnes
8	DF	AUS	Bertie Lutton
9	MF	AUS	Joe Watson
10	FW	ENG	Terry Smith

No.	Pos.	Nation	Player
11	FW	BRA	Hilton Silva
12	DF	AUS	Steve O'Connor
13	FW	SCO	Bobby McGuinness
14	DF	ENG	Alan Kershaw
20	GK	AUS	Tony Pezzano
—	GK	AUS	Todd Clarke
—	MF	BRA	Luis de Melo
—	GK	AUS	Alan Farley
—	FW	ANG	Lopez Manecas

=== Transfers in ===
Date from	Position	Name	From	Fee	Ref.
26 January 1977	DF	(England) Alan Kershaw	(England) Southport	Free transfer	
26 January 1977	FW	(England) Joe Fletcher	(England) Wigan Athletic	Free transfer	

== Competitions ==
=== Overview ===
Competition	First match	Last match	Starting round	Final position	Record							
Competition	First match	Last match	Starting round	Final position	Pld	W	D	L	GF	GA	GD	Win %
National Soccer League	3 April 1977	25 September 1977	Matchday 1	1st	26	13	11	2	52	28	+24	50.00
NSL Cup	20 September 1977		First round	First round	1	0	0	1	0	1	−1	0.00
Total					27	13	11	3	52	29	+23	48.15

Source: Competitions

=== National Soccer League ===
==== League table ====
Pos	Team	Pld	W	D	L	GF	GA	GD	Pts
1	Eastern Suburbs (C)	26	13	11	2	52	28	+24	37
2	Marconi Fairfield	26	15	7	4	42	21	+21	37
3	Fitzroy United	26	12	8	6	41	34	+7	32
4	Adelaide City	26	12	7	7	50	31	+19	31
5	Western Suburbs	26	11	7	8	38	29	+9	29

Source: rsssf.com
Rules for classification: 1) Points; 2) Goal difference; 3) Goals scored
(C) Champions

==== Results summary ====
Overall								Home						Away					
Pld	W	D	L	GF	GA	GD	Pts	W	D	L	GF	GA	GD	W	D	L	GF	GA	GD
26	13	11	2	52	28	+24	50	8	3	2	30	16	+14	5	8	0	22	12	+10

Source: worldfootball.net

==== Results by round ====
Round	1	2	3	4	5	6	7	8	9	10	11	12	13	14	15	16	17	18	19	20	21	22	23	24	25	26
Ground	A	H	A	H	A	H	H	A	H	A	H	A	H	A	H	A	H	H	A	A	H	A	H	A	H	A
Result	W	W	D	L	D	W	L	D	D	W	W	W	W	D	D	D	W	D	W	D	W	W	W	D	W	D
Position	2	2	3	5	6	3	5	4	4	4	4	3	2	3	3	3	2	2	2	2	2	1	1	1	1	1
Points	2	4	5	5	6	8	8	9	10	12	14	16	18	19	20	21	23	24	26	27	29	31	33	34	36	37

Source: worldfootball.net
A = Away; H = Home; W = Win; D = Draw; L = Loss

==== Matches ====
Win Draw Loss

3 April 1977 1	Fitzroy United	1–3	Eastern Suburbs	Melbourne
	Taylor 89' (pen.)	Report	Mowbray 65'; Lutton 70'; Smith 75'	Stadium: Olympic Park; Attendance: 7,460; Referee: Jim Dixon

10 April 1977 2	Eastern Suburbs	4–3	Footscray JUST	Sydney
	Muniz 19' (pen.); Barnes 50'; Smith 65'; Lutton 89'	Report	Ristovski 15', 67' (pen.); Kriaris 57'	Stadium: Sydney Sports Ground; Attendance: 1,500; Referee: Tim Davies

17 April 1977 3	Brisbane City	0–0	Eastern Suburbs	Brisbane
		Report		Stadium: Perry Park; Attendance: 6,322; Referee: Dave Nugent

24 April 1977 4	Eastern Suburbs	2–4	Marconi Fairfield	Sydney
	Muniz 34' (pen.); Stevenson 88'	Report	Mariani 9'; Richards 10'; Byrne 54' (pen.); Campbell 71'	Stadium: Wentworth Park; Attendance: 2,563; Referee: John van der Lende

1 May 1977 5	St George-Budapest	1–1	Eastern Suburbs	Sydney
	Morgan 37'	Report	Smith 66'	Stadium: Sydney Sports Ground; Attendance: 1,763; Referee: Bill Jones

7 May 1977 6	Eastern Suburbs	6–1	Adelaide City	Sydney
	Silva 15'; Smith 20'; Barnes 41', 43', 53'; Lutton 70'	Report	Marocchi 19'	Stadium: Sydney Sports Ground; Attendance: 2,800; Referee: Barry Wilkinson

15 May 1977 7	Eastern Suburbs	0–1	South Melbourne	Sydney
		Report	Gibson 53'	Stadium: Wentworth Park; Attendance: 750; Referee: Brian Fowler

22 May 1977 8	Mooroolbark	2–2	Eastern Suburbs	Melbourne
	P. Ontong 56'; Tront 65'	Report	Stevenson 11'; de Melo 26'	Stadium: Wembley Park; Attendance: 1,150; Referee: Stewart Mellings

29 May 1977 9	Eastern Suburbs	1–1	West Adelaide	Sydney
	Lutton 77'	Report	Farley 45' (o.g.)	Stadium: Wentworth Park; Attendance: 2,000; Referee: Richard Lorenc

5 June 1977 10	Brisbane Lions	0–4	Eastern Suburbs	Brisbane
		Report	Kershaw 5'; Smith 53', 70', 82'	Stadium: Perry Park; Attendance: 3,100; Referee: Des Miles

12 June 1977 11	Eastern Suburbs	2–1	Canberra City	Sydney
	Smith 10'; Stevenson 28'	Report	J. Stoddart 15'	Stadium: Wentworth Park; Attendance: 1,239; Referee: Peter Rampley

18 June 1977 12	Western Suburbs	3–4	Eastern Suburbs	Sydney
	Wilson 11'; Ainslie 53'; Fryer 86'	Report	Kershaw 10', 63'; Barnes 50', 55'	Stadium: Sydney Sports Ground; Attendance: 1,275; Referee: Barry Wilkinson

26 June 1977 13	Eastern Suburbs	2–0	Sydney Olympic	Sydney
	Barnes 6'; Smith 67'	Report		Stadium: Wentworth Park; Attendance: 6,115; Referee: Tony Boskovic

3 July 1977 14	Footscray JUST	2–2	Eastern Suburbs	Melbourne
	Ristovski 26'; Palinkas 34'	Report	Barnes 28', 38'	Stadium: Middle Park; Attendance: 1,500; Referee: Stewart Mellings

10 July 1977 15	Eastern Suburbs	1–1	Fitzroy United	Sydney
	Kershaw 52'	Report	Cole 90'	Stadium: Wentworth Park; Attendance: 5,334; Referee: Richard Lorenc

17 July 1977 16	Marconi Farfield	1–1	Eastern Suburbs	Sydney
	Thomson 44' (o.g.)	Report	Manecas 45'	Stadium: Marconi Oval; Attendance: 5,835; Referee: Barry Wilkinson

23 July 1977 17	Eastern Suburbs	3–1	Brisbane City	Sydney
	Coyne 42' (o.g.); Watson 48'; Manecas 55'	Report	Wallace 84'	Stadium: Marconi Oval; Attendance: 5,482; Referee: Peter Rampley

31 July 1977 18	Eastern Suburbs	2–2	St George-Budapest	Sydney
	Manecas 5'; Barnes 14'	Report	Morgan 32'; O'Conner 34'	Stadium: Wentworth Park; Attendance: 2,033; Referee: John Tattersall

7 August 1977 19	Adelaide City	1–2	Eastern Suburbs	Adelaide
	Deans 12'	Report	Smith 6', 52'	Stadium: Olympic Park Field; Attendance: 8,500; Referee: Stewart Mellings

14 August 1977 20	South Melbourne	0–0	Eastern Suburbs	Melbourne
		Report		Stadium: Middle Park; Attendance: 2,000; Referee: David Yelland

21 August 1977 21	Eastern Suburbs	3–0	Mooroolbark	Sydney
	Lutton 62'; McGuinness 88'; Barnes 89'	Report		Stadium: Wentworth Park; Attendance: 2,117; Referee: Doug Rennie

28 August 1977 22	West Adelaide	1–3	Eastern Suburbs	Adelaide
	Krytikos 68'	Report	Smith 2'; Barnes 83'; O'Connor 88'	Stadium: Hindmarsh Stadium; Attendance: 4,600; Referee: Chris Bambridge

4 September 1977 23	Eastern Suburbs	2–0	Brisbane Lions	Sydney
	Stevenson 8'; Smith 78'	Report		Stadium: Wentworth Park; Attendance: 2,205; Referee: Tim Davies

10 September 1977 24	Canberra City	0–0	Eastern Suburbs	Canberra
		Report		Stadium: Manuka Oval; Attendance: 1,600; Referee: Tony Beazleigh

18 September 1977 25	Eastern Suburbs	2–1	Western Suburbs	Sydney
	Smith 55'; Stevenson 83' (pen.)	Report	Norris 49'	Stadium: Wentworth Park; Attendance: 1,278; Referee: Don Campbell

25 September 1977 26	Sydney Olympic	0–0	Eastern Suburbs	Sydney
		Report		Stadium: Wentworth Park; Attendance: 2,987; Referee: Chris Bambridge

=== NSL Cup ===
Win Draw Loss

20 September 1977 First round	Marconi Fairfield	1–0	Eastern Suburbs	Sydney
	Prskalo 25'	Report		Stadium: Marconi Oval; Attendance: 2,237; Referee: Richard Lorenc

== Statistics ==
=== Appearances and goals ===
Includes all competitions. Players with no appearances not included in the list.

No.	Pos.	Nat.	Player	National Soccer League		NSL Cup		Total	
No.	Pos.	Nat.	Player	Apps	Goals	Apps	Goals	Apps	Goals
1	GK	(Australia)	Malcolm Haynes	11	0	0	0	11	0
2	DF	(Australia)	Kevin Mullen	22+1	1	1	0	24	1
3	DF	(Scotland)	Eddie Thomson	18	0	1	0	19	0
4	DF	(Scotland)	Alex Robertson	23	0	1	0	24	0
5	DF	(Scotland)	Harry Mowbray	25	1	1	0	26	1
6	MF	(Australia)	John Stevenson	26	5	1	0	27	5
7	MF	(Australia)	Murray Barnes	22+1	12	1	0	24	12
8	DF	(Australia)	Bertie Lutton	16+2	5	0	0	18	5
9	MF	(Australia)	Joe Watson	22	0	1	0	23	0
10	FW	(England)	Terry Smith	22+1	14	1	0	24	14
11	FW	(Brazil)	Hilton Silva	24	1	1	0	25	1
12	DF	(Australia)	Steve O'Connor	17+3	1	1	0	21	1
13	FW	(Scotland)	Bobby McGuinness	2+9	1	0+1	0	12	1
14	DF	(England)	Alan Kershaw	10+2	4	0	0	12	4
20	GK	(Australia)	Tony Pezzano	3	0	0	0	3	0
—	GK	(Australia)	Todd Clarke	5	0	1	0	6	0
—	MF	(Brazil)	Luis de Melo	1+3	1	0	0	4	1
—	GK	(Australia)	Alan Farley	7	0	0	0	7	0
—	FW	(Angola)	Lopez Manecas	5	3	0	0	5	3
Player(s) transferred out but featured this season
—	MF	(Australia)	Agenor Muniz	5	2	0	0	5	2

=== Disciplinary record ===
Includes all competitions. The list is sorted by squad number when total cards are equal. Players with no cards not included in the list.

Rank	No.	Pos.	Nat.	Player	National Soccer League			NSL Cup			Total		
Rank	No.	Pos.	Nat.	Player	Yellow card	Second yellow card	Red card	Yellow card	Second yellow card	Red card	Yellow card	Second yellow card	Red card
1	2	DF	(Australia)	Kevin Mullen	7	0	0	0	0	0	7	0	0
2	4	DF	(Scotland)	Alex Robertson	0	0	0	1	0	0	1	0	0
2	7	MF	(Australia)	Murray Barnes	0	0	0	1	0	0	1	0	0
2	8	DF	(Australia)	Bertie Lutton	1	0	0	0	0	0	1	0	0
2	11	FW	(Brazil)	Hilton Silva	1	0	0	0	0	0	1	0	0
2	12	DF	(Australia)	Steve O'Connor	1	0	0	0	0	0	1	0	0
2	13	FW	(Scotland)	Bobby McGuinness	1	0	0	0	0	0	1	0	0
2	14	DF	(England)	Alan Kershaw	1	0	0	0	0	0	1	0	0
2	—	MF	(Australia)	Agenor Muniz	1	0	0	0	0	0	1	0	0
Total					13	0	0	2	0	0	15	0	0

=== Clean sheets ===
Includes all competitions. The list is sorted by squad number when total clean sheets are equal. Numbers in parentheses represent games where both goalkeepers participated and both kept a clean sheet; the number in parentheses is awarded to the goalkeeper who was substituted on, whilst a full clean sheet is awarded to the goalkeeper who was on the field at the start of play. Goalkeepers with no clean sheets not included in the list.

Rank	No.	Nat.	Goalkeeper	NSL	NSL Cup	Total
1	—	(Australia)	Malcolm Haynes	5	0	5
2	—	(Australia)	Todd Clarke	1	0	1
2	—	(Australia)	Alan Farley	1	0	1
2	—	(Australia)	Tony Pezzano	1	0	1
Total				8	0	8
