= 1979 Sydney City FC season =

Sydney City
1979 season
- Manager: Gerry Chaldi
- Stadium: Wentworth Park; Sydney Sports Ground; Grahame Park
- National Soccer League: 3rd
- NSL Cup: Quarter-finals
- Top goalscorer: Terry Smith (10)

The 1979 season was Sydney City's third season in the National Soccer League. In addition to the domestic league, they also participated in the NSL Cup. Sydney City finished 3rd in their National Soccer League season, and were eliminated in the NSL Cup quarter-finals by Newcastle KB United.

== Players ==
Note: Flags indicate national team as defined under FIFA eligibility rules; some limited exceptions apply. Players may hold more than one non-FIFA nationality.

No.	Pos.	Nation	Player
1	GK	AUS	Todd Clarke
2	DF	AUS	Kevin Mullen
3	DF	SCO	Eddie Thomson (Captain)
4	DF	AUS	Steve O'Connor
5	DF	SCO	Henry Mowbray
6	MF	AUS	John Stevenson
7	MF	AUS	Joe Watson
8	MF	AUS	Murray Barnes
9	FW	AUS	Ernie Campbell
10	FW	ENG	Terry Smith
11	FW	BRA	Hilton Silva
12	DF	SCO	Ian Bruce

No.	Pos.	Nation	Player
13	DF	ENG	Alan Kershaw
15	MF	AUS	Marcos Silva
16	FW	BRA	Nelio Borges
17	FW	WAL	Mark Trenter
18	MF	AUS	Ian Souness
19	MF	AUS	Jim Patikas
20	GK	AUS	Tony Pezzano
21	MF	AUS	Lloyd Hardes
—	MF	BRA	Luis de Melo
—	DF	CRC	Gerry Gomez
—	FW	SCO	Danny McGeough
—	DF	AUS	Jim Webber

== Competitions ==
=== Overview ===
Competition	First match	Last match	Starting round	Final position	Record							
Competition	First match	Last match	Starting round	Final position	Pld	W	D	L	GF	GA	GD	Win %
National Soccer League	9 March 1979	23 September 1979	Matchday 1	3rd	26	15	3	8	47	29	+18	57.69
National Soccer League Finals	7 October 1979	4 November 1979	First round	Winners	5	3	1	1	6	4	+2	60.00
NSL Cup	25 April 1979	30 May 1979	First round	Quarter-finals	3	2	0	1	7	5	+2	66.67
Total					34	20	4	10	60	38	+22	58.82

Last updated: complete
Source: Competitions

=== National Soccer League ===
==== League table ====
Pos	Team	Pld	W	D	L	GF	GA	GD	Pts	Qualification or relegation
1	Marconi Fairfield (C)	26	15	6	5	58	32	+26	40 (Note: A Bonus Point was awarded for victories of 4 goals or more.)	Qualification to Finals series (Note: The Finals series was not considered the championship for the 1979 National Soccer League.)
2	Heidelberg United	26	14	7	5	44	30	+14	36	Qualification to Finals series
3	Sydney City	26	15	3	8	47	29	+18	34	Qualification to Finals series
4	Brisbane City	26	14	5	7	38	30	+8	34	Qualification to Finals series
5	Adelaide City	26	13	6	7	43	27	+16	33	
6	Newcastle KB United	26	11	9	6	43	30	+13	32	
7	West Adelaide	26	10	4	12	28	31	−3	25	
8	APIA Leichhardt	26	11	3	12	29	37	−8	25	
9	Brisbane Lions	26	8	6	12	28	40	−12	22	
10	Footscray JUST	26	8	3	15	29	43	−14	20	
11	St George-Budapest	26	7	6	13	27	43	−16	20	
12	Canberra City	26	6	8	12	25	41	−16	20	
13	Sydney Olympic (R)	26	7	5	14	23	30	−7	19	Relegated to the 1980 NSW State League
14	South Melbourne	26	6	3	17	26	45	−19	16	

Updated to match(es) played on unknown. Source: rsssf.com
Rules for classification: 1) points; 2) goal difference; 3) number of goals scored.
(C) Champions; (R) Relegated

==== Results by round ====
Round	1	2	3	4	5	6	7	8	9	10	11	12	13	14	15	16	17	18	19	20	21	22	23	24	25	26
Ground	A	H	H	A	H	A	H	A	H	A	H	A	H	A	H	H	A	A	H	A	H	A	H	A	H	A
Result	W	L	L	W	W	W	W	W	L	W	L	D	W	D	D	W	L	L	W	W	L	W	W	W	L	W
Position	3	8	9	8	3	3	3	3	2	2	2	3	3	3	2	2	2	3	2	2	4	3	3	2	3	3

Source: worldfootball.net
A = Away; H = Home; W = Win; D = Draw; L = Loss

==== Matches ====
9 March 1979 1	Brisbane Lions	1–2	Sydney City	Brisbane
	Hermiston 53'	Report	Souness 40'; Stevenson 76' (pen.)	Stadium: Perry Park; Attendance: 2,000; Referee: Des Miles

18 March 1979 2	Sydney City	2–3	Adelaide City	Sydney
	Souness 4'; Barnes 45'	Report	Deans 48', 58', 68'	Stadium: Wentworth Park; Attendance: 3,495; Referee: Tim Davies

25 March 1979 3	Sydney City	0–4	Marconi-Fairfield	Sydney
		Report	Krncevic 16', 89'; Jankovics 74', 86'	Stadium: Wentworth Park; Attendance: 2,844; Referee: Tony Boskovic

1 April 1979 4	St George-Budapest	0–5	Sydney City	Sydney
		Report	Smith 31', 56', 75'; Stevenson 25'; Barnes 63'	Stadium: St George Stadium; Attendance: 1,783; Referee: Richard Lorenc

8 April 1979 5	Sydney City	3–0	Footscray JUST	Sydney
	Watson 6'; Campbell 68'; Stevenson 80'	Report		Stadium: Wentworth Park; Attendance: 2,034; Referee: Ken Allen

15 April 1979 6	South Melbourne	1–2	Sydney City	Melbourne
	Kalifatidis 54'	Report	Smith 22'; Barnes 26'	Stadium: Middle Park; Attendance: 8,000; Referee: Jack Johnston

22 April 1979 7	Sydney City	3–0	West Adelaide	Sydney
	Watson 9'; Smith 42', 84'	Report		Stadium: Wentworth Park; Attendance: 1,891; Referee: Peter Rampley

29 April 1979 8	Brisbane City	0–1	Sydney City	Brisbane
		Report	Thomson 13'	Stadium: Perry Park; Attendance: 3,100; Referee: Jack Wood

6 May 1979 9	Sydney City	2–3	APIA Leichhardt	Sydney
	Smith 6', 80'	Report	Reed 19', 53'; Carruthers 89'	Stadium: Wentworth Park; Attendance: 2,835; Referee: Richard Lorenc

12 May 1979 10	Newcastle KB United	0–1	Sydney City	Newcastle
		Report	Campbell 63'	Stadium: Newcastle International Sports Centre; Attendance: 9,823; Referee: Henry Witschge

3 June 1979 11	Sydney City	3–4	Sydney Olympic	Sydney
	Watson 11', 15', 60'	Report	Eaton 23'; Ainslie 64' (pen.); Laing 67'; Jennings 82'	Stadium: Wentworth Park; Attendance: 2,249; Referee: Stewart Mellings

10 June 1979 12	Heidelberg United	2–2	Sydney City	Melbourne
	Campbell 54'; Paton 69'	Report	Barnes 44'; Smith 80'	Stadium: Olympic Park; Attendance: 4,500; Referee: Chris Bambridge

17 June 1979 13	Sydney City	2–1	Canberra City	Sydney
	Watson 67'; Barnes 84'	Report	Byrne 40'	Stadium: Wentworth Park; Attendance: 2,378; Referee: Tim Davies

24 June 1979 14	Adelaide City	1–1	Sydney City	Adelaide
	Kent 70'	Report	Barnes 51'	Stadium: Olympic Sports Field; Attendance: 8,550; Referee: Nick Karlich

8 July 1979 16	Sydney City	3–1	St George-Budapest	Sydney
	Stevenson 42'; Souness 50'; Smith 62'	Report	O'Connor 21'	Stadium: Wentworth Park; Attendance: 1,741; Referee: Dave Nugent

15 July 1979 17	Marconi-Fairfield	1–0	Sydney City	Sydney
	Sharne 8'	Report		Stadium: Marconi Oval; Attendance: 8,784; Referee: Tony Beazleigh

22 July 1979 18	Footscray JUST	1–0	Sydney City	Melbourne
	Ollerton 85'	Report		Stadium: Olympic Park; Attendance: 800; Referee: Bob Kerr

29 July 1979 19	Sydney City	2–0	South Melbourne	Sydney
	Mullen 44'; Souness 90+1' (pen.)	Report		Stadium: Wentworth Park; Attendance: 1,027; Referee: Bill Jones

5 August 1979 20	West Adelaide	0–2	Sydney City	Adelaide
		Report	Tymczyszyn 16' (o.g.); Stevenson 81'	Stadium: Hindmarsh Stadium; Attendance: 2,500; Referee: Stewart Mellings

15 August 1979 21	Sydney City	0–1	Brisbane City	Sydney
		Report	Low 4'	Stadium: Sydney Sports Ground; Attendance: 745; Referee: Richard Lorenc

22 August 1979 15	Sydney City	1–1	Brisbane Lions	Sydney
	Trenter 67'	Report	Fairbrother 43'	Stadium: Sydney Sports Ground; Attendance: 500; Referee: Doug Rennie

26 August 1979 22	APIA Leichhardt	0–3	Sydney City	Sydney
		Report	Barnes 42'; Trenter 46'; Silva 74'	Stadium: Wentworth Park; Attendance: 4,620; Referee: Tony Boskovic

1 September 1979 23	Sydney City	2–0	Newcastle KB United	Gosford
	Trenter 25'; Silva 74'	Report		Stadium: Grahame Park; Attendance: 6,730; Referee: Tim Davies

9 September 1979 24	Sydney Olympic	0–1	Sydney City	Sydney
		Report	Silva 48'	Stadium: St George Stadium; Attendance: 2,649; Referee: Jim Reeves

16 September 1979 25	Sydney City	1–3	Heidelberg United	Sydney
	Silva 31'	Report	Taylor 11'; Cole 45'; Eaton 60'	Stadium: Wentworth Park; Attendance: 1,654; Referee: Dave Nugent

23 September 1979 26	Canberra City	1–3	Sydney City	Canberra
	Moulis 26'	Report	Trenter 26', 61', 77'	Stadium: Bruce Stadium; Attendance: 1,685; Referee: Chris Bambridge

==== Finals series ====
The Finals series was not considered the championship for the 1979 National Soccer League.

7 October 1979 1	Brisbane City	2–0	Sydney City	Brisbane
	Campbell 48', 63'	Report		Stadium: Perry Park; Attendance: 3,200; Referee: Jim Reeves

14 October 1979 2	Heidelberg United	1–3	Sydney City	Melbourne
	Cole 70'	Report	Stevenson 14'; Trenter 18'; Yzendoorn 68' (o.g.)	Stadium: Olympic Park No. 2 Attendance: 4,500; Referee: Don Campbell

21 October 1979 3	Marconi-Fairfield	0–1	Sydney City	Sydney
		Report	Barnes 75'	Stadium: Marconi Oval; Attendance: 4,782; Referee: Stewart Mellings

28 October 1979 Grand Final 1st Leg	Sydney City	1–0	Brisbane City	Sydney
	M. Silva 78'	Report		Stadium: Wentworth Park; Attendance: 2,532; Referee: Ken Allen

4 November 1979 Grand Final 2nd Leg	Brisbane City	1–1	Sydney City	Brisbane
	Kelso 78'	Report	Trenter 84'	Stadium: Perry Park; Attendance: 4,200; Referee: Don Campbell

=== NSL Cup ===
25 April 1979 First round	Sydney City	4–2	Auburn	Sydney
	Borges ?', ?', ?'; Stevenson ?'	Report	Leak ?'; Montgomery ?'	Stadium: Wentworth Park; Referee: Henry Witschge

20 May 1979 Second round	Sydney City	2–1	Melita Eagles	Sydney
	Barnes 21'; Mullen 57'	Report	Allan 59'	Stadium: Sydney Sports Ground; Attendance: 1,052; Referee: Peter Rampley

30 May 1979 Quarter-finals	Newcastle KB United	2–1 (a.e.t.)	Sydney City	Newcastle
	Boden 67'; Summerscales 111'	Report	Stevenson 64'	Stadium: Newcastle International Sports Centre; Attendance: 4,427; Referee: Stewart Mellings

== Statistics ==
=== Appearances and goals ===
Players with no appearances not included in the list.

No.	Pos.	Nat.	Name	National Soccer League		NSL Cup		Total	
No.	Pos.	Nat.	Name	Apps	Goals	Apps	Goals	Apps	Goals
1	GK	(Australia)	Todd Clarke	31	0	2	0	33	0
2	DF	(Australia)	Kevin Mullen	20(2)	1	2	1	24	2
3	DF	(Scotland)	Eddie Thomson	16(2)	1	2	0	20	1
4	DF	(Australia)	Steve O'Connor	29	0	3	0	32	0
6	MF	(Australia)	John Stevenson	30	6	3	2	33	8
7	MF	(Australia)	Joe Watson	26	6	3	0	29	6
8	MF	(Australia)	Murray Barnes	30	8	3	1	33	9
9	FW	(Australia)	Ernie Campbell	20(6)	2	3	0	29	2
10	FW	(England)	Terry Smith	16(1)	10	0	0	17	10
11	FW	(Brazil)	Hilton Silva	22(2)	4	2	0	26	4
12	DF	(Scotland)	Ian Bruce	28(1)	0	3	0	32	0
13	DF	(England)	Alan Kershaw	18(2)	0	0	0	20	0
15	MF	(Australia)	Marcos Silva	1(2)	1	0	0	3	1
16	FW	(Brazil)	Neilo Borges	6(1)	0	2(1)	3	10	3
17	FW	(Wales)	Mark Trenter	14(2)	8	0	0	16	8
18	MF	(Australia)	Ian Souness	28(1)	4	2(1)	0	32	4
19	MF	(Australia)	Jim Patikas	1(4)	0	0	0	5	0
20	GK	(Australia)	Tony Pezzano	0	0	1	0	1	0
21	MF	(Australia)	Lloyd Hardes	0(1)	0	1	0	2	0
—	DF	(Costa Rica)	Gerry Gomez	3(2)	0	0	0	5	0
—	FW	(Scotland)	Danny McGeough	1	0	1	0	2	0
—	DF	(Australia)	Jim Webber	1(1)	0	0	0	2	0

=== Clean sheets ===
Rank	No.	Pos	Nat	Name	National Soccer League	NSL Cup	Total
1	1	GK	(Australia)	Todd Clarke	12	0	12
Total					12	0	12
