= 1980 Sydney City FC season =

Eastern Suburbs
1980 season
- Manager: Gerry Chaldi
- National Soccer League: 1st
- NSL Finals: Runners-up
- NSL Cup: Quarter-finals
- Top goalscorer: League: Ken Boden (14); All: Ken Boden (16)

The 1980 season was Sydney City's fourth season in the National Soccer League. In addition to the domestic league, they also participated in the NSL Cup. Sydney City finished 1st in their National Soccer League season, and were eliminated in the NSL Cup quarter-finals by Brisbane Lions.

== Players ==
Note: Flags indicate national team as defined under FIFA eligibility rules; some limited exceptions apply. Players may hold more than one non-FIFA nationality.

No.	Pos.	Nation	Player
1	GK	AUS	Todd Clarke
2	DF	AUS	Kevin Mullen
3	DF	SCO	Eddie Thomson (Captain)
4	DF	AUS	Steve O'Connor
5	DF	SCO	Ian Bruce
6	MF	AUS	John Stevenson
7	MF	AUS	Joe Watson
8	MF	AUS	Murray Barnes
9	MF	AUS	Ken Boden

No.	Pos.	Nation	Player
10	FW	ENG	Terry Smith
11	FW	BRA	Hilton Silva
12	DF	AUS	John Spanos
14	DF	CRC	Gerry Gomez
16	MF	AUS	Jim Patikas
17	MF	AUS	Marcos Silva
18	MF	AUS	Ian Souness
20	GK	AUS	Tony Pezzano
—	FW	BRA	Nelio Borges

== Competitions ==
=== Overview ===
Competition	First match	Last match	Starting round	Final position	Record							
Competition	First match	Last match	Starting round	Final position	Pld	W	D	L	GF	GA	GD	Win %
National Soccer League	9 March 1980	28 September 1980	Matchday 1	1st	26	16	5	5	51	26	+25	61.54
National Soccer League Finals	11 October 1980	26 October 1980	Semi-finals	Runners-up	2	1	0	1	2	4	−2	50.00
NSL Cup	25 April 1980	3 August 1980	First round	Quarter-finals	3	2	0	1	10	4	+6	66.67
Total					31	19	5	7	63	34	+29	61.29

Last updated: complete
Source: Competitions

=== National Soccer League ===
==== League table ====
Pos	Team	Pld	W	D	L	GF	GA	GD	Pts	Qualification or relegation
1	Sydney City (C)	26	16	5	5	51	26	+25	37	Qualification to Finals series (Note: The Finals series was not considered the championship for the 1980 National Soccer League.)
2	Heidelberg United	26	15	6	5	55	33	+22	36	Qualification to Finals series
3	South Melbourne	26	15	5	6	42	21	+21	35	Qualification to Finals series
4	Marconi Fairfield	26	14	6	6	53	32	+21	34	Qualification to Finals series
5	Adelaide City	26	13	4	9	40	27	+13	30	
6	Newcastle KB United	26	12	6	8	32	31	+1	30	
7	Brisbane Lions	26	7	11	8	28	32	−4	25	
8	APIA Leichhardt	26	8	7	11	27	35	−8	23	
9	Footscray JUST	26	7	9	10	32	41	−9	23	
10	Canberra City	26	7	7	12	34	33	+1	21	
11	Blacktown City	26	9	3	14	34	55	−21	21	
12	Brisbane City	26	4	10	12	29	36	−7	18	
13	West Adelaide	26	7	3	16	24	46	−22	17	
14	St George-Budapest (R)	26	5	4	17	32	65	−33	14	Relegated to the 1981 NSW State League

Updated to match(es) played on unknown. Source: rsssf.com
Rules for classification: 1) points; 2) goal difference; 3) number of goals scored.
(C) Champions; (R) Relegated

==== Results by round ====
Round	1	2	3	4	5	6	7	8	9	10	11	12	13	14	15	16	17	18	19	20	21	22	23	24	25	26
Ground	H	A	H	A	H	A	A	H	A	H	A	H	A	H	A	H	A	A	H	H	A	H	A	H	A	H
Result	W	W	D	W	W	L	W	W	L	L	W	W	W	W	L	W	D	W	D	W	D	W	W	D	L	W
Position	3	1	1	1	1	2	2	2	3	3	3	2	2	2	2	2	2	2	1	1	2	1	1	1	1	1

Source: worldfootball.net
A = Away; H = Home; W = Win; D = Draw; L = Loss

==== Matches ====
9 March 1980 1	Sydney City	2–1	Marconi Fairfield	Sydney
15:00 AEST	Smith 7'; Boden 55'	Report	Krncevic 87'	Stadium: Sydney Sports Ground; Attendance: 1,027; Referee: Tim Davies

16 March 1980 2	Newcastle KB United	0–3	Sydney City	Newcastle
		Report	Boden 8'; Borges 22'; Barnes 46'	Stadium: Newcastle International Sports Centre; Attendance: 9,147; Referee: Jim Reeves

23 March 1980 3	Sydney City	1–1	Heidelberg United	Sydney
15:00 AEST	Spanos 22'	Report	Yzendoorn 69'	Stadium: Sydney Sports Ground; Attendance: 1,827; Referee: Henry Witschge

30 March 1980 4	South Melbourne	1–2	Sydney City	Melbourne
	Buljevic 85'	Report	Boden 30', 52'	Stadium: Middle Park; Attendance: 5,000; Referee: Chris Bambridge

6 April 1980 5	Sydney City	7–0	West Adelaide	Sydney
	Stevenson 10', 70'; Barnes 30', 46', 55'; Smith 35'; Souness 83'	Report		Stadium: ES Marks Athletics Field; Attendance: 3,174; Referee: Peter Rampley

13 April 1980 6	Brisbane Lions	2–0	Sydney City	Brisbane
	Niven 52'; Millman 54'	Report		Stadium: Lions Stadium; Attendance: 3,114; Referee: Ken Allen

20 April 1980 7	Blacktown City	1–3	Sydney City	Sydney
	Hunter 40'	Report	Smith 10'; Boden 32'; Barnes 35'	Stadium: Gabbie Stadium; Attendance: 3,054; Referee: Tim Davies

27 April 1980 8	Sydney City	4–2	APIA Leichhardt	Sydney
15:00 AEST	Barnes 4', 28'; Boden 41', 71'	Report	O'Connor 83', 85'	Stadium: ES Marks Athletics Field; Attendance: 3,460; Referee: Tony Boskovic

4 May 1980 9	Brisbane City	1–0	Sydney City	Brisbane
	Brusasco 58' (pen.)	Report		Stadium: Perry Park; Attendance: 2,536; Referee: Stewart Mellings

11 May 1980 10	Sydney City	0–2	Canberra City	Sydney
15:00 AEST		Report	J. O'Shea 21'; Byrne 55'	Stadium: ES Marks Athletics Field; Attendance: 3,030; Referee: Tony Beazleigh

18 May 1980 11	Footscray JUST	1–2	Sydney City	Melbourne
	Ollerton 66'	Report	Barnes 65'; Stevenson 75'	Stadium: Olympic Park; Attendance: 2,557; Referee: Jack Johnston

25 May 1980 12	Sydney City	2–1	Adelaide City	Sydney
15:00 AEST	Trenter 81'; Watson 85'	Report	J. Nyskohus 16'	Stadium: ES Marks Athletics Field; Attendance: 2,390; Referee: Tim Davies

8 June 1980 14	Sydney City	2–0	Newcastle KB United	Sydney
	Boden 67'; Mullen 81'	Report		Stadium: ES Marks Athletics Field; Attendance: 3,016; Referee: Peter Rampley

22 June 1980 16	Sydney City	2–1	South Melbourne	Sydney
	Boden 24'; Trenter 37'	Report	Christopoulos 75'	Stadium: ES Marks Athletics Field; Attendance: 3,601; Referee: Tony Boskovic

29 June 1980 13	St George-Budapest	0–2	Sydney City	Sydney
		Report	Watson 70'; Stevenson 84'	Stadium: St George Stadium; Attendance: 2,118; Referee: Doug Rennie

12 July 1980 17	Heidelberg United	0–0	Sydney City	Melbourne
		Report		Stadium: Olympic Park; Attendance: 4,307; Referee: Dave Nugent

20 July 1980 18	West Adelaide	0–2	Sydney City	Adelaide
		Report	Stevenson 63'; Barnes 81'	Stadium: Hindmarsh Stadium; Attendance: 2,900; Referee: Chris Bambridge

27 July 1980 19	Sydney City	1–1	Brisbane Lions	Sydney
	Stevenson 37' (pen.)	Report	Millman 11'	Stadium: ES Marks Athletics Field; Attendance: 1,908; Referee: Henry Witschge

6 August 1980 15	Marconi Fairfield	2–0	Sydney City	Sydney
15:00 AEST	Jankovics 20'; Krncevic 90+1'	Report		Stadium: Marconi Oval; Attendance: 5,218; Referee: Don Campbell

10 August 1980 20	Sydney City	3–0	Blacktown City	Sydney
	Stevenson 32', 49'; Barnes 83'	Report		Stadium: ES Marks Athletics Field; Attendance: 2,580; Referee: Jim Reeves

17 August 1980 21	APIA Leichhardt	2–2	Sydney City	Sydney
	Pirie 29'; Coyne 45'	Report	Boden 48' (pen.); Smith 83'	Stadium: Lambert Park; Attendance: 3,965; Referee: Peter Rampley

31 August 1980 22	Sydney City	2–1	Brisbane City	Sydney
15:00 AEST	Watson 3'; Gomez 8'	Report		Stadium: ES Marks Athletics Field; Attendance: 1,502; Referee: Ken Allen

7 September 1980 23	Canberra City	2–3	Sydney City	Canberra
	O'Shea 53'; Valeri 76'	Report	Spanos 63'; Boden 78'; Trenter 87'	Stadium: Bruce Stadium; Attendance: 1,680; Referee: Chris Bambridge

14 September 1980 24	Sydney City	2–2	Footscray JUST	Sydney
15:00 AEST	Trenter 16'; Spanos 90+4'	Report	Lujic 60', 87'	Stadium: ES Marks Athletics Field; Attendance: 1,500; Referee: Doug Rennie

21 September 1980 25	Adelaide City	1–0	Sydney City	Adelaide
	J. Nyskohus 59'	Report		Stadium: Olympic Sports Field; Attendance: 3,100; Referee: Dennis Stanley

28 September 1980 26	Sydney City	4–1	St George-Budapest	Sydney
	Boden 38', 48'; Trenter 60', 86'	Report	Griffith 52'	Stadium: ES Marks Athletics Field; Attendance: 3,540; Referee: Tim Davies

==== Finals series ====
11 October 1980 Qualifying Semi-Final	Sydney City	2–0	Heidelberg United	Sydney
	Trenter 35'; Boden 39' (pen.)	Report		Stadium: Sydney Sports Ground; Attendance: 3,457; Referee: Tony Boskovic

26 October 1980 Grand Final	Sydney City	0–4	Heidelberg United	Canberra
		Report	Cole 32', 43' (pen.), 77'; Paton 87'	Stadium: Bruce Stadium; Attendance: 11,126; Referee: Don Campbell

=== NSL Cup ===
25 April 1980 First round	Sydney City	7–1	Sydney Croatia	Sydney
	M. Silva ?', ?', ?'; Boden ?', ?'; Barnes ?'; Souness ?'	Report	Mullen ?'	Stadium: ES Marks Athletics Field; Attendance: 2,041; Referee: Peter Rampley

6 July 1980 Second round	APIA Leichhardt	1–2	Sydney City	Sydney
	Harding 40'	Report	Barnes 70', 90+5'	Stadium: Lambert Park; Attendance: 2,540; Referee: Jack Johnston

3 August 1980 Quarter-finals	Brisbane Lions	2–1	Sydney City	Brisbane
	Hermiston 50' (pen.); Millman 67'	Report	Bruce 86'	Stadium: Lions Stadium; Attendance: 1,800; Referee: Ken Allen

== Statistics ==
=== Appearances and goals ===
Players with no appearances not included in the list.

No.	Pos.	Nat.	Name	National Soccer League		NSL Cup		Total	
No.	Pos.	Nat.	Name	Apps	Goals	Apps	Goals	Apps	Goals
1	GK	(Australia)	Todd Clarke	21	0	2	0	23	0
2	DF	(Australia)	Kevin Mullen	20(3)	1	3	0	26	1
3	DF	(Scotland)	Eddie Thomson	11(1)	0	1(1)	0	14	0
4	DF	(Australia)	Steve O'Connor	23	0	3	0	26	0
5	DF	(Scotland)	Ian Bruce	27	0	3	1	30	1
6	MF	(Australia)	John Stevenson	28	8	1(2)	0	31	8
7	MF	(Australia)	Joe Watson	26(2)	3	3	0	31	0
8	MF	(Australia)	Murray Barnes	23(1)	10	3	3	27	13
9	MF	(Australia)	Ken Boden	28	14	2(1)	2	31	16
10	FW	(England)	Terry Smith	11(2)	4	3	0	16	4
11	FW	(Brazil)	Hilton Silva	18(1)	0	2(1)	0	22	0
12	DF	(Australia)	John Spanos	25(2)	3	2	0	29	3
14	DF	(Costa Rica)	Gerry Gomez	7	1	0	0	7	1
16	MF	(Australia)	Jim Patikas	1(6)	0	0	0	7	0
17	MF	(Australia)	Marcos Silva	0(6)	0	1	3	7	3
18	MF	(Australia)	Ian Souness	16(9)	1	3	1	28	2
20	GK	(Australia)	Tony Pezzano	7(1)	0	1(1)	0	10	0
—	FW	(Brazil)	Neilo Borges	2(2)	1	0	0	4	1
Player(s) transferred out but featured this season
19	FW	(Wales)	Mark Trenter	14(1)	7	0	0	15	7

=== Clean sheets ===
Rank	No.	Pos	Nat	Name	National Soccer League	NSL Cup	Total
1	20	GK	(Australia)	Tony Pezzano	4	0	4
2	1	GK	(Australia)	Todd Clarke	3	0	3
Total					7	0	7
