= 1978 Footscray JUST season =

Footscray JUST
1978 season
- Head Coach: Cedo Cirkovic
- Stadium: Junction Oval; Schintler Reserve; Olympic Park; Middle Park Soccer Stadium
- National Soccer League: 12th
- NSL Cup: First round
- Top goalscorer: League: Zdravko Lujic (6); All: Zdravko Lujic (6)
- Highest home attendance: 12,000 vs. Brisbane Lions (20 August 1978); National Soccer League
- Lowest home attendance: 800 vs. Sydney Olympic (6 August 1978); National Soccer League
- Average home league attendance: 3,327
- Biggest win: 4–0 vs. Brisbane Lions (H) (20 August 1978); National Soccer League
- Biggest defeat: 0–4 vs. South Melbourne (A) (9 July 1978); National Soccer League

The 1978 season was the second in the National Soccer League for Footscray JUST. In addition to the domestic league, they also participated in the NSL Cup.

== Players ==
Note: Flags indicate national team as defined under FIFA eligibility rules; some limited exceptions apply. Players may hold more than one non-FIFA nationality.

| No. | Pos. | Nation | Player |
|---|---|---|---|
| 1 | GK | SCO | Dennis Boland |
| 2 | DF | ENG | Alan Parrott |
| 3 | DF | AUS | Andy Kazi |
| 4 | DF | AUS | Jim Kriaris |
| 5 | DF | GRE | Jim Kondarios |
| 6 | MF | YUG | Mirko Rujevic |
| 7 | FW | HUN | Joe Palinkas |
| 8 | MF | AUS | Zoran Ilioski |
| 9 | MF | AUS | Josip Picioane |
| 10 | FW | YUG | Dragan Vasic |

| No. | Pos. | Nation | Player |
|---|---|---|---|
| 11 | FW | AUS | Mendo Ristovski |
| 12 | MF | YUG | Zdravko Lujic |
| 14 | DF | YUG | Igor Hazabent |
| 15 | MF | AUS | John Martin |
| 16 | | AUS | John Nicolaides |
| 17 | MF | YUG | Andrija Ristic |
| — | MF | AUS | Vlatko Belic |
| — | FW | SCO | Bobby McGuinness |
| — | GK | ENG | Mike O'Hara |

== Competitions ==
=== Overall record ===
| Competition | First match | Last match | Starting round | Final position | Record | | | | | | | |
| Competition | First match | Last match | Starting round | Final position | Pld | W | D | L | GF | GA | GD | Win % |
|---|---|---|---|---|---|---|---|---|---|---|---|---|
| National Soccer League | 5 March 1978 | 27 August 1978 | Matchday 1 | 12th | 26 | 7 | 8 | 11 | 29 | 37 | −8 | 26.92 |
| NSL Cup | 31 May 1978 | | First round | First round | 0 | 0 | 0 | 0 | 1 | 2 | −1 | — |
| Total | | | | | 26 | 7 | 8 | 11 | 30 | 39 | −9 | 26.92 |

Source: Competitions

=== National Soccer League ===
==== League table ====
| Pos | Team | Pld | W | D | L | GF | GA | GD | Pts |
|---|---|---|---|---|---|---|---|---|---|
| 10 | Adelaide City | 26 | 9 | 6 | 11 | 38 | 44 | −6 | 24 |
| 11 | Newcastle KB United | 26 | 6 | 10 | 10 | 33 | 40 | −7 | 22 |
| 12 | Footscray JUST | 26 | 7 | 8 | 11 | 29 | 37 | −8 | 22 |
| 13 | Canberra City | 26 | 5 | 10 | 11 | 28 | 41 | −13 | 20 |
| 14 | Brisbane City | 26 | 7 | 3 | 16 | 29 | 49 | −20 | 17 |

Source: rsssf.com
Rules for classification: 1) Points; 2) Goal difference; 3) Goals scored

==== Results summary ====
| Overall | | | | | | | | Home | | | | | | Away | | | | | |
| Pld | W | D | L | GF | GA | GD | Pts | W | D | L | GF | GA | GD | W | D | L | GF | GA | GD |
|---|---|---|---|---|---|---|---|---|---|---|---|---|---|---|---|---|---|---|---|
| 26 | 7 | 8 | 11 | 29 | 37 | −8 | 29 | 2 | 3 | 8 | 17 | 21 | −4 | 5 | 5 | 3 | 12 | 16 | −4 |

Source: worldfootball.net

==== Results by round ====
| Round | 1 | 2 | 3 | 4 | 5 | 6 | 7 | 8 | 9 | 10 | 11 | 13 | 14 | 12 | 15 | 16 | 17 | 18 | 19 | 20 | 21 | 22 | 23 | 24 | 25 | 26 |
|---|---|---|---|---|---|---|---|---|---|---|---|---|---|---|---|---|---|---|---|---|---|---|---|---|---|---|
| Ground | A | A | H | H | A | H | A | A | H | A | H | H | H | A | H | A | A | H | A | H | H | A | H | A | H | A |
| Result | W | L | L | D | D | L | W | D | W | D | L | L | D | D | L | W | W | L | L | D | L | L | L | D | W | W |
| Position | 4 | 9 | 11 | 12 | 12 | 13 | 11 | 11 | 7 | 6 | 9 | 10 | 10 | 9 | 10 | 10 | 8 | 9 | 10 | 10 | 13 | 13 | 13 | 13 | 12 | 12 |
| Points | 2 | 2 | 2 | 3 | 4 | 4 | 6 | 7 | 9 | 10 | 10 | 10 | 11 | 12 | 12 | 14 | 16 | 16 | 16 | 17 | 17 | 17 | 17 | 18 | 20 | 22 |

Source: worldfootball.net
A = Away; H = Home; W = Win; D = Draw; L = Loss

==== Matches ====
Win Draw Loss

| 5 March 1978 1 | Adelaide City | 0–1 | Footscray JUST | Adelaide |
| | | Report | Nicolaides 28' | Stadium: Olympic Sports Field; Attendance: 6,500; Referee: Don Campbell |

| 12 March 1978 2 | Brisbane City | 3–0 | Footscray JUST | Brisbane |
| | Gaffney 32'; Echeverria 49'; Caldwell 55' | Report | | Stadium: Perry Park; Attendance: 5,000; Referee: Jack Wood |

| 18 March 1978 3 | Footscray JUST | 0–2 | Marconi Fairfield | Melbourne |
| | | Report | Parrott 30' (o.g.); Mariani 51' | Stadium: Junction Oval; Attendance: 4,200; Referee: David Yelland |

| 25 March 1978 4 | Footscray JUST | 1–1 | Eastern Suburbs | Melbourne |
| | Ristovski 88' | Report | Stevenson 23' (pen.) | Stadium: Schintler Reserve; Attendance: 3,000; Referee: Ken Allen |

| 2 April 1978 5 | Western Suburbs | 0–0 | Footscray JUST | Sydney |
| | | Report | | Stadium: Englefield Stadium; Attendance: 1,023; Referee: Tony Boskovic |

| 9 April 1978 6 | Footscray JUST | 0–2 | South Melbourne | Melbourne |
| | | Report | Ollerton 45', 78' | Stadium: Olympic Park; Attendance: 8,250; Referee: Bob Henderson |

| 16 April 1978 7 | West Adelaide | 1–2 | Footscray JUST | Adelaide |
| | Bozanic 32' | Report | Picioane 82'; Rujevic 85' | Stadium: Hindmarsh Stadium; Attendance: 5,523; Referee: Jack Tarling |

| 22 April 1978 8 | Canberra City | 1–1 | Footscray JUST | Canberra |
| | Stark 72' | Report | Picioane 29' | Stadium: Bruce Stadium; Attendance: 5,020; Referee: Tim Davies |

| 29 April 1978 9 | Footscray JUST | 2–0 | St George-Budapest | Melbourne |
| | Palinkas 13'; Ristovski 86' | Report | | Stadium: Middle Park Soccer Stadium; Attendance: 2,500; Referee: Chris Bambridge |

| 7 May 1978 10 | Sydney Olympic | 1–1 | Footscray JUST | Sydney |
| | Laing 58' | Report | Picioane 24' | Stadium: Wentworth Park; Attendance: 6,311; Referee: Alf Rodway |

| 13 May 1978 11 | Footscray JUST | 0–1 | Newcastle KB United | Melbourne |
| | | Report | Mountford 48' | Stadium: Schitler Reserve; Attendance: 3,000; Referee: David Yelland |

| 27 May 1978 13 | Footscray JUST | 1–2 | Fitzroy United | Melbourne |
| | Palinkas 6' | Report | Cole 12', 65' | Stadium: Schintler Reserve; Attendance: 4,500 |

| 3 June 1978 14 | Footscray JUST | 2–2 | Brisbane City | Melbourne |
| | Lujic 49'; Rujevic 57' | Report | Rujevic 43' (o.g.); Caldwell 58' | Stadium: Schintler Reserve; Attendance: 1,000; Referee: Dieter Klose |

| 5 June 1978 12 | Brisbane Lions | 0–0 | Footscray JUST | Brisbane |
| | | Report | | Stadium: Perry Park; Attendance: 2,500; Referee: Dieter Klose |

| 10 June 1978 15 | Footscray JUST | 0–1 | Adelaide City | Melbourne |
| | | Report | Deans 7' | Stadium: Schintler Reserve; Attendance: 1,000 |

| 17 June 1978 16 | Marconi Fairfield | 1–2 | Footscray JUST | Sydney |
| | Rooney 72' | Report | Rujevic 73'; Nicolaides 87' | Stadium: Marconi Oval; Attendance: 3,000; Referee: Jim Reeves |

| 25 June 1978 17 | Eastern Suburbs | 1–2 | Footscray JUST | Sydney |
| | Trenter 89' | Report | Rujevic 55'; Lujic 71' | Stadium: Wentworth Park; Attendance: 2,458; Referee: Brian Fowler |

| 1 July 1978 18 | Footscray JUST | 2–3 | Western Suburbs | Melbourne |
| | Palinkas 20'; Lujic 55' | Report | Turnbull 63'; Eaton 68'; Fisher 72' | Stadium: Middle Park Soccer Stadium; Attendance: 1,000; Referee: Stewart Mellings |

| 9 July 1978 19 | South Melbourne | 4–0 | Footscray JUST | Melbourne |
| | Campbell 2'; Cummings 45'; Evans 61'; Christopoulos 84' | Report | | Stadium: Middle Park Soccer Stadium; Attendance: 4,500; Referee: Tony Beazleigh |

| 16 July 1978 20 | Footscray JUST | 2–2 | West Adelaide | Melbourne |
| | Kriaris 49'; Vasic 58' | Report | Jones 65'; McGregor 73' | Stadium: Middle Park Soccer Stadium; Attendance: 1,000; Referee: Jim Dixon |

| 23 July 1978 21 | Footscray JUST | 1–2 | Canberra City | Melbourne |
| | Palinkas 4' | Report | Byrne 36', 68' | Stadium: Schintler Reserve; Attendance: 1,000; Referee: Chris Bambridge |

| 30 July 1978 22 | St George-Budapest | 3–1 | Footscray JUST | Sydney |
| | O'Shea 18'; O'Connor 46', 61' | Report | McGuinness 84' | Stadium: St George Stadium; Attendance: 3,676; Referee: Henry Witschge |

| 6 August 1978 23 | Footscray JUST | 2–3 | Sydney Olympic | Melbourne |
| | Kondarios 49'; Lujic 81' | Report | McIntosh 14', 48'; Laing 62' | Stadium: Middle Park Soccer Stadium; Attendance: 800; Referee: Tony Beazleigh |

| 12 August 1978 24 | Newcastle KB United | 1–1 | Footscray JUST | Newcastle |
| | Boden 38' (pen.) | Report | Ristovski 23' | Stadium: Newcastle International Sports Centre; Attendance: 6,834; Referee: Tim Davies |

| 20 August 1978 25 | Footscray JUST | 4–0 | Brisbane Lions | Melbourne |
| | Ilioski 8'; Lujic 26'; Picioane 43'; Nicolaides 75' | Report | | Stadium: Middle Park Soccer Stadium; Attendance: 12,000; Referee: David Yelland |

| 27 August 1978 26 | Fitzroy United | 0–1 | Footscray JUST | Melbourne |
| | | Report | Lujic 18' | Stadium: Olympic Park; Attendance: 4,000; Referee: Stewart Mellings |

=== NSL Cup ===
Win Draw Loss

| 31 May 1978 First round | Footscray JUST | 1–2 | South Melbourne | Melbourne |
| | Ristovski ?' | Report | Rogers 27'; Lutton 57' | Stadium: Olympic Park; Attendance: 3,000 |

== Statistics ==
=== Appearances and goals ===
Includes all competitions. Players with no appearances not included in the list.

| No. | Pos. | Nat. | Player | National Soccer League | | NSL Cup | | Total | |
| No. | Pos. | Nat. | Player | Apps | Goals | Apps | Goals | Apps | Goals |
|---|---|---|---|---|---|---|---|---|---|
| 1 | GK | (Scotland) | Dennis Boland | 18 | 0 | 1 | 0 | 19 | 0 |
| 2 | DF | (England) | Alan Parrott | 2 | 0 | 0 | 0 | 2 | 0 |
| 3 | DF | (Australia) | Andy Kazi | 15+3 | 0 | 1 | 0 | 19 | 0 |
| 4 | DF | (Australia) | Jim Kriaris | 20 | 1 | 0 | 0 | 20 | 1 |
| 5 | DF | (Greece) | Jim Kondarios | 26 | 1 | 1 | 0 | 27 | 1 |
| 6 | MF | (Socialist Federal Republic of Yugoslavia) | Mirko Rujevic | 23 | 4 | 1 | 0 | 24 | 4 |
| 7 | FW | (Hungary) | Joe Palinkas | 19+2 | 4 | 1 | 0 | 22 | 4 |
| 8 | MF | (Australia) | Zoran Ilioski | 26 | 1 | 0 | 0 | 26 | 1 |
| 9 | MF | (Australia) | Josip Picioane | 24 | 4 | 1 | 0 | 25 | 4 |
| 10 | FW | (Socialist Federal Republic of Yugoslavia) | Dragan Vasic | 15+6 | 1 | 1 | 0 | 22 | 1 |
| 11 | FW | (Australia) | Mendo Ristovski | 20+2 | 3 | 1 | 1 | 23 | 4 |
| 12 | MF | (Socialist Federal Republic of Yugoslavia) | Zdravko Lujic | 23 | 6 | 1 | 0 | 24 | 6 |
| 14 | DF | (Socialist Federal Republic of Yugoslavia) | Igor Hazabent | 22 | 0 | 0 | 0 | 22 | 0 |
| 15 | MF | (Australia) | John Martin | 0 | 0 | 0+1 | 0 | 1 | 0 |
| 16 | | (Australia) | John Nicolaides | 14+7 | 3 | 1 | 0 | 22 | 3 |
| 17 | MF | (Socialist Federal Republic of Yugoslavia) | Andrija Ristic | 4+1 | 0 | 0 | 0 | 5 | 0 |
| — | MF | (Australia) | Vlatko Belic | 1 | 0 | 0 | 0 | 1 | 0 |
| — | FW | (Australia) | Bobby McGuinness | 1+2 | 1 | 0 | 0 | 3 | 1 |
| — | GK | (England) | Mike O'Hara | 8+1 | 0 | 0 | 0 | 9 | 0 |

=== Disciplinary record ===
Includes all competitions. The list is sorted by squad number when total cards are equal. Players with no cards not included in the list.

| Rank | No. | Pos. | Nat. | Player | National Soccer League | | | NSL Cup | | | Total | | |
| Rank | No. | Pos. | Nat. | Player | Yellow card | Second yellow card | Red card | Yellow card | Second yellow card | Red card | Yellow card | Second yellow card | Red card |
|---|---|---|---|---|---|---|---|---|---|---|---|---|---|
| 1 | 6 | MF | (Socialist Federal Republic of Yugoslavia) | Mirko Rujevic | 1 | 0 | 1 | 0 | 0 | 0 | 1 | 0 | 1 |
| 2 | 12 | MF | (Socialist Federal Republic of Yugoslavia) | Zdravko Lujic | 0 | 0 | 1 | 0 | 0 | 0 | 0 | 0 | 1 |
| 3 | 14 | DF | (Socialist Federal Republic of Yugoslavia) | Igor Hazabent | 5 | 0 | 0 | 0 | 0 | 0 | 5 | 0 | 0 |
| 4 | 4 | DF | (Australia) | Jim Kriaris | 2 | 0 | 0 | 0 | 0 | 0 | 2 | 0 | 0 |
| 4 | 7 | FW | (Hungary) | Joe Palinkas | 2 | 0 | 0 | 0 | 0 | 0 | 2 | 0 | 0 |
| 6 | 5 | DF | (Greece) | Jim Kondarios | 1 | 0 | 0 | 0 | 0 | 0 | 1 | 0 | 0 |
| Total | | | | | 11 | 0 | 2 | 0 | 0 | 0 | 11 | 0 | 2 |

=== Clean sheets ===
Includes all competitions. The list is sorted by squad number when total clean sheets are equal. Numbers in parentheses represent games where both goalkeepers participated and both kept a clean sheet; the number in parentheses is awarded to the goalkeeper who was substituted on, whilst a full clean sheet is awarded to the goalkeeper who was on the field at the start of play. Goalkeepers with no clean sheets not included in the list.

| Rank | No. | Nat. | Goalkeeper | NSL | NSL Cup | Total |
|---|---|---|---|---|---|---|
| 1 | 1 | (Australia) | Dennis Boland | 4 | 0 | 4 |
| 2 | — | (England) | Mike O'Hara | 2 | 0 | 2 |
| Total | | | | 6 | 0 | 6 |
