= 1982 South Melbourne FC season =

South Melbourne
1982 season
- Head Coach: John Margaritis; Mick Watson; Tommy Docherty
- Stadium: Middle Park Soccer Stadium
- National Soccer League: 6th
- NSL Cup: First round
- Top goalscorer: League: Charlie Egan (20); All: Charlie Egan (20)
- Highest home attendance: 7,000 vs. West Adelaide (7 March 1982); National Soccer League vs. Sydney Olympic (30 May 1982); National Soccer League
- Lowest home attendance: 1,500 vs. APIA Leichhardt (5 September 1982); National Soccer League
- Average home league attendance: 4,153
- Biggest win: 4–0 vs. Brisbane City (H) (21 March 1982); National Soccer League vs. Canberra City (A) (11 July 1982); National Soccer League
- Biggest defeat: 0–3 vs. Adelaide City (H) (2 May 1982); National Soccer League
Home colours	Away colours

The 1982 season was the sixth in the National Soccer League for South Melbourne Football Club. In addition to the domestic league, they also participated in the NSL Cup. South Melbourne finished 6th in their National Soccer League season, and were eliminated in the first round of the NSL Cup.

== Players ==
Note: Flags indicate national team as defined under FIFA eligibility rules; some limited exceptions apply. Players may hold more than one non-FIFA nationality.

No.	Pos.	Nation	Player
1	GK	AUS	Peter Laumets
3	MF	SCO	Jim Shirra
4	DF	AUS	Steve Blair
5	DF	AUS	Arthur Xanthopoulos
7	MF	AUS	Billy Rogers
8	DF	AUS	Alan Davidson
9	FW	NZL	Steve Wooddin
10	FW	ENG	Alun Evans
11	FW	AUS	Branko Buljevic
12	DF	AUS	Gerry Bennett

No.	Pos.	Nation	Player
13	MF	AUS	Socrates Nicolaidis
14	FW	AUS	Charlie Egan
16	FW	SCO	George Campbell
19	MF	AUS	Carl Halford
20	GK	GRE	Lou Tsigaris
—	DF	AUS	David Jones
—	DF	AUS	Bertie Lutton
—		AUS	Tony Owen
—	MF	AUS	John Stevenson
—	MF	NZL	Grant Turner

== Competitions ==
=== Overall record ===
Competition	First match	Last match	Starting round	Final position	Record							
Competition	First match	Last match	Starting round	Final position	Pld	W	D	L	GF	GA	GD	Win %
National Soccer League	14 February 1982	5 September 1982	Matchday 1	6th	30	11	9	10	46	37	+9	36.67
NSL Cup	14 June 1982		First round	First round	1	0	1	0	0	0	+0	0.00
Total					31	11	10	10	46	37	+9	35.48

Source: Competitions

=== National Soccer League ===
==== League table ====
Pos	Team	Pld	W	D	L	GF	GA	GD	Pts	Relegation
1	Sydney City (C)	30	20	5	5	68	28	+40	45	Qualification to Finals series (Note: The Finals series was not considered the championship for the 1982 National Soccer League.)
2	St George-Budapest	30	14	8	8	47	40	+7	36	Qualification to Finals series
3	Wollongong City	30	16	3	11	43	46	−3	35	Qualification to Finals series
4	Heidelberg United	30	13	8	9	42	37	+5	34	Qualification to Finals series
5	Preston Makedonia	30	12	10	8	45	41	+4	34	
6	South Melbourne	30	11	9	10	46	37	+9	31	
7	APIA Leichhardt	30	12	7	11	49	54	−5	31	
8	Sydney Olympic	30	12	6	12	52	42	+10	30	
9	West Adelaide	30	10	8	12	44	40	+4	28	
10	Marconi Fairfield	30	12	4	14	44	43	+1	28	
11	Brisbane Lions	30	10	8	12	39	42	−3	28	
12	Newcastle KB United	30	10	7	13	43	52	−9	27	
13	Adelaide City	30	6	12	12	36	44	−8	24	
14	Footscray JUST	30	5	14	11	34	46	−12	24	
15	Canberra City	30	7	10	13	37	54	−17	24	
16	Brisbane City	30	5	11	14	32	55	−23	21	

Source: rsssf.com
Rules for classification: 1) points; 2) goal difference; 3) number of goals scored.
(C) Champions

==== Results summary ====
Overall								Home						Away					
Pld	W	D	L	GF	GA	GD	Pts	W	D	L	GF	GA	GD	W	D	L	GF	GA	GD
30	12	10	8	45	41	+4	46	8	4	3	29	17	+12	4	6	5	16	24	−8

Source: worldfootball.net

==== Results by round ====
Round	1	2	3	4	5	6	7	8	9	10	11	12	13	14	15	16	17	18	19	20	21	22	23	24	25	26	27	28	29	30
Ground	H	A	A	H	A	H	A	H	A	H	A	H	A	H	A	H	A	A	H	A	H	A	H	A	H	A	H	A	H	H
Result	W	W	L	D	L	W	D	D	D	L	L	L	L	W	D	W	L	L	D	D	W	W	W	L	D	D	W	W	L	W
Position	1	2	6	5	7	4	7	7	5	7	10	11	12	11	10	9	11	13	13	12	10	9	8	9	9	9	9	6	7	6
Points	2	4	4	5	5	7	8	9	10	10	10	10	10	12	13	15	15	15	16	17	19	21	23	23	24	25	27	29	29	31

Source: worldfootball.net
A = Away; H = Home; W = Win; D = Draw; L = Loss

==== Matches ====
Win Draw Loss

14 February 1982 1	South Melbourne	3–0	Wollongong City	Melbourne
	Egan 53' (?); Davidson (?)	Report		Stadium: Middle Park Soccer Stadium; Attendance: 1,800; Referee: Stewart Mellings

21 February 1982 2	Sydney Olympic	1–2	South Melbourne	Sydney
	Koussas 58'	Report	Evans 21', 48'	Stadium: Lambert Park; Attendance: 8,023; Referee: Dave Nugent

28 February 1982 3	Sydney City	2–1	South Melbourne	Sydney
	Boden 7'; Spanos 85'	Report	Campbell 6'	Stadium: St George Stadium; Attendance: 3,700; Referee: Tim Davies

7 March 1982 4	South Melbourne	2–2	West Adelaide	Melbourne
	Campbell 68'; Egan 90+2'	Report	Heys 70'; Manecas 76'	Stadium: Middle Park Soccer Stadium; Attendance: 7,000; Referee: Chris Bambridge

14 March 1982 5	APIA Leichhardt	3–2	South Melbourne	Sydney
	Burrows 10'; Soper 80', 88'	Report	Egan 53'; Buljevic 86'	Stadium: Lambert Park; Attendance: 2,794; Referee: Jim Reeves

21 March 1982 6	South Melbourne	4–0	Brisbane City	Melbourne
	Egan 65', 84'; Campbell 36' (pen.); Wooddin 63'	Report		Stadium: Middle Park Soccer Stadium; Attendance: 4,000; Referee: Dennis Voutsinas

28 March 1982 7	Footscray JUST	1–1	South Melbourne	Melbourne
	Cozzella 75'	Report	Egan 9'	Stadium: Schintler Reserve; Attendance: 5,000; Referee: Stewart Mellings

4 April 1982 8	South Melbourne	1–1	Canberra City	Melbourne
	Buljevic 35'	Report	Brennan 85'	Stadium: Middle Park Soccer Stadium; Attendance: 4,000; Referee: Jim Fearn

10 April 1982 9	Newcastle KB United	2–2	South Melbourne	Newcastle
	Gemmell 54'; McClelland 78'	Report	Stevenson 75'; Egan 82'	Stadium: Newcastle International Sports Centre; Attendance: 3,700; Referee: Doug Rennie

18 April 1982 10	South Melbourne	0–1	Heidelberg United	Melbourne
		Report	Campbell 75'	Stadium: Middle Park Soccer Stadium; Attendance: 5,000; Referee: Stewart Mellings

25 April 1982 11	St George-Budapest	2–1	South Melbourne	Sydney
	Stone 44'; Slater 62'	Report	Egan 51'	Stadium: St George Stadium; Attendance: 3,789; Referee: Richard Lorenc

2 May 1982 12	South Melbourne	0–3	Adelaide City	Melbourne
		Report	J. Nyskohus 5', 73'; Villani 49'	Stadium: Middle Park Soccer Stadium; Attendance: 4,000; Referee: David Yelland

9 May 1982 13	Marconi Fairfield	2–1	South Melbourne	Sydney
	Bozanic 44' (pen.); Jankovics 62'	Report	Evans 26'	Stadium: Marconi Stadium; Attendance: 3,281; Referee: Peter Rampley

16 May 1982 14	South Melbourne	2–1	Brisbane Lions	Melbourne
	Campbell 20'; Egan 50'	Report	Atmore 80'	Stadium: Middle Park Soccer Stadium; Attendance: 5,000; Referee: Jim Fearn

23 May 1982 15	Preston Makedonia	1–1	South Melbourne	Melbourne
	Petrovski 54'	Report	Egan 32'	Stadium: B.T. Connor Reserve; Attendance: 5,000; Referee: Chris Bambridge

30 May 1982 16	South Melbourne	2–1	Sydney Olympic	Melbourne
	Egan 46'; Blair 65'	Report	Katholos 64'	Stadium: Middle Park Soccer Stadium; Attendance: 7,000; Referee: Stewart Mellings

6 June 1982 17	Wollongong City	1–0	South Melbourne	Wollongong
	O'Connor 79'	Report		Stadium: Wollongong Showground; Attendance: 3,274; Referee: Peter Rampley

13 June 1982 18	West Adelaide	1–0	South Melbourne	Adelaide
	Brown 15'	Report		Stadium: Hindmarsh Stadium; Attendance: 4,200; Referee: Bob Kerr

20 June 1982 19	South Melbourne	2–2	Sydney City	Melbourne
	Buljevic 61'; Egan 78'	Report	Spanos 63'; Borges 65'	Stadium: Middle Park Soccer Stadium; Attendance: 4,000; Referee: Jack Johnston

27 June 1982 20	Brisbane City	1–1	South Melbourne	Brisbane
	Bohan 57'	Report	Buljevic 63'	Stadium: Spencer Park; Attendance: 1,800; Referee: Tim Davies

4 July 1982 21	South Melbourne	3–2	Footscray JUST	Melbourne
	Egan 5', 67'; Halford 90'	Report	Ristovski 26'; Simic 43'	Stadium: Middle Park Soccer Stadium; Attendance: 5,000; Referee: Chris Bambridge

11 July 1982 22	Canberra City	0–4	South Melbourne	Canberra
15:00 AEST		Report	Davidson (?); Egan 52', 89'; Buljevic 90'	Stadium: Bruce Stadium; Attendance: 2,000; Referee: Richard Lorenc

18 July 1982 23	South Melbourne	2–1	Newcastle KB United	Melbourne
	Buljevic 63', 75'	Report	Curran 8'	Stadium: Middle Park Soccer Stadium; Attendance: 2,500; Referee: Evan Venios

25 July 1982 24	Heidelberg United	2–0	South Melbourne	Melbourne
	J. Campbell 5'; Cole 19'	Report		Stadium: Olympic Village; Attendance: 6,000; Referee: David Yelland

1 August 1982 25	South Melbourne	0–0	St George-Budapest	Melbourne
		Report		Stadium: Middle Park Soccer Stadium; Attendance: 3,000; Referee: Chris Bambridge

8 August 1982 26	Adelaide City	1–1	South Melbourne	Adelaide
	Manou 70'	Report	Egan 11'	Stadium: Olympic Sports Field; Attendance: 1,200; Referee: Don Campbell

15 August 1982 27	South Melbourne	3–1	Marconi Fairfield	Melbourne
	Campbell 9'; Buljevic 62'; Nicolaidis 68'	Report	Licata 78'	Stadium: Middle Park Soccer Stadium; Attendance: 2,500; Referee: Bill Monteverde

22 August 1982 28	Brisbane Lions	0–2	South Melbourne	Brisbane
		Report	Egan 33'; Rogers 44'	Stadium: Richlands Stadium; Attendance: 700; Referee: Alan Kibbler

29 August 1982 29	South Melbourne	0–1	Preston Makedonia	Melbourne
		Report	Brown 89'	Stadium: Middle Park Soccer Stadium; Attendance: 6,000; Referee: Tim Davies

5 September 1982 30	South Melbourne	3–1	APIA Leichhardt	Melbourne
	Kilkelly 13' (o.g.); Davidson 60'; Egan 71'	Report	Soper 50'	Stadium: Middle Park Soccer Stadium; Attendance: 1,500; Referee: Chris Bambridge

=== NSL Cup ===
14 June 1982 First round	South Melbourne	0–0 (a.e.t.) (4–5 p)	Heidelberg United	Melbourne
		Report		Stadium: Middle Park Soccer Stadium; Attendance: 6,000; Referee: Jim Fearn

== Statistics ==
=== Appearances and goals ===
Includes all competitions. Players with no appearances not included in the list.

No.	Pos	Nat	Player	Total		National Soccer League		NSL Cup	
No.	Pos	Nat	Player	Apps	Goals	Apps	Goals	Apps	Goals
1	GK	(Australia) AUS	Peter Laumets	24	0	24	0	0	0
3	MF	(Scotland) SCO	Jim Shirra	22	0	21	0	1	0
4	DF	(Australia) AUS	Steve Blair	30	1	26+3	1	1	0
5	DF	(Australia) AUS	Arthur Xanthopoulos	31	0	30	0	1	0
7	MF	(Australia) AUS	Billy Rogers	22	1	21	1	1	0
8	DF	(Australia) AUS	Alan Davidson	23	3	22	3	1	0
9	FW	(New Zealand) NZL	Steve Wooddin	4	1	2+2	1	0	0
10	FW	(England) ENG	Alun Evans	21	3	19+2	3	0	0
11	FW	(Australia) AUS	Branko Buljevic	23	8	13+9	8	0+1	0
12	DF	(Australia) AUS	Gerry Bennett	20	0	19	0	1	0
13	MF	(Australia) AUS	Socrates Nicolaidis	26	1	25	1	1	0
14	FW	(Australia) AUS	Charlie Egan	31	20	30	20	1	0
16	FW	(Scotland) SCO	George Campbell	30	5	29	5	1	0
19	MF	(Australia) AUS	Carl Halford	14	1	12+1	1	1	0
20	GK	(Greece) GRE	Lou Tsigaris	7	0	6	0	1	0
	DF	(Australia) AUS	David Jones	10	0	9+1	0	0	0
	DF	(Australia) AUS	Bertie Lutton	2	0	2	0	0	0
		(Australia) AUS	Tony Owen	1	0	1	0	0	0
	MF	(Australia) AUS	John Stevenson	19	1	17+2	1	0	0
	MF	(New Zealand) NZL	Grant Turner	3	0	3	0	0	0

=== Disciplinary record ===
Includes all competitions. The list is sorted by squad number when total cards are equal. Players with no cards not included in the list.

No.	Pos	Nat	Player	Total			National Soccer League			NSL Cup		
No.	Pos	Nat	Player	Yellow card	Second yellow card	Red card	Yellow card	Second yellow card	Red card	Yellow card	Second yellow card	Red card
8	DF	(Australia) AUS	Alan Davidson	2	0	1	2	0	1	0	0	0
3	MF	(Scotland) SCO	Jim Shirra	4	0	0	3	0	0	1	0	0
4	DF	(Australia) AUS	Steve Blair	4	0	0	4	0	0	0	0	0
10	FW	(England) ENG	Alun Evans	4	0	0	4	0	0	0	0	0
7	MF	(Australia) AUS	Billy Rogers	3	0	0	3	0	0	0	0	0
14	FW	(Australia) AUS	Charlie Egan	3	0	0	3	0	0	0	0	0
16	FW	(Scotland) SCO	George Campbell	2	0	0	2	0	0	0	0	0
5	DF	(Australia) AUS	Arthur Xanthopoulos	1	0	0	1	0	0	0	0	0
	MF	(New Zealand) NZL	Grant Turner	1	0	0	1	0	0	0	0	0

- (yellow card) = Number of bookings; (second yellow card) = Number of sending offs after a second yellow card; (red card) = Number of sending offs by a direct red card.
