= 1981 South Melbourne FC season =

South Melbourne
1981 season
- Head Coach: John Margaritis
- Stadium: Middle Park Soccer Stadium
- National Soccer League: 2nd
- NSL Cup: First round
- Top goalscorer: League: Alun Evans (11); All: Alun Evans (11)
- Highest home attendance: 12,500 vs. Heidelberg United (1 March 1981); National Soccer League
- Lowest home attendance: 4,000 (four matches)
- Average home league attendance: 6,810
- Biggest win: 5–0 vs. West Adelaide (2 August 1981); National Soccer League
- Biggest defeat: 0–2 (4 times); 1–3 (once)

The 1981 season was the fifth in the National Soccer League for South Melbourne Football Club. In addition to the domestic league, they also participated in the NSL Cup. South Melbourne finished 2nd in their National Soccer League season, and were eliminated in the first round of the NSL Cup.

== Players ==
Note: Flags indicate national team as defined under FIFA eligibility rules; some limited exceptions apply. Players may hold more than one non-FIFA nationality.

No.	Pos.	Nation	Player
1	GK	AUS	Peter Laumets
2	DF	SCO	Vince Bannon
3	DF	AUS	Alan Davidson
4	DF	AUS	Bertie Lutton
5	DF	AUS	Arthur Xanthopoulos
6	MF	AUS	Billy Rogers
8	MF	AUS	George Christopoulos
9	FW	AUS	Duncan Cummings
10	FW	ENG	Alun Evans

No.	Pos.	Nation	Player
11	FW	AUS	Branko Buljevic
13	FW	AUS	Steve Wooddin
14	FW	SCO	George Campbell
15	MF	AUS	John Stevenson
16	MF	SCO	Jim Shirra
19	DF	AUS	Steve Blair
20	GK	GRE	Lou Tsigaras
—	MF	AUS	Socrates Nicolaides

== Competitions ==
=== Overall record ===
Competition	First match	Last match	Starting round	Final position	Record							
Competition	First match	Last match	Starting round	Final position	Pld	W	D	L	GF	GA	GD	Win %
National Soccer League	15 February 1981	13 September 1981	Matchday 1	2nd	30	13	13	4	41	27	+14	43.33
NSL Cup	11 March 1981		First round	First round	1	0	0	1	0	2	−2	0.00
Total					31	13	13	5	41	29	+12	41.94

Source: Competitions

=== National Soccer League ===
==== League table ====
Pos	Team	Pld	W	D	L	GF	GA	GD	Pts	Relegation
1	Sydney City (C)	30	19	5	6	59	30	+29	43	
2	South Melbourne	30	13	13	4	41	27	+14	39	
3	Brisbane City	30	12	11	7	37	25	+12	35	
4	APIA Leichhardt	30	12	11	7	39	33	+6	35	
5	Canberra City	30	13	7	10	41	32	+9	33	
6	Brisbane Lions	30	11	11	8	41	33	+8	33	
7	Adelaide City	30	13	6	11	46	42	+4	32	
8	Heidelberg United	30	12	7	11	48	40	+8	31	
9	Sydney Olympic	30	11	9	10	46	46	0	31	
10	Newcastle KB United	30	11	8	11	41	41	0	30	
11	Wollongong City	30	8	12	10	35	39	−4	28	
12	Preston Makedonia	30	9	7	14	39	41	−2	25	
13	Footscray JUST	30	9	7	14	32	48	−16	25	
14	Marconi Fairfield	30	9	7	14	23	45	−22	25	
15	Blacktown City (R)	30	6	9	15	32	47	−15	21	Relegated to the 1982 NSW State League
16	West Adelaide	30	5	4	21	26	57	−31	14	

Updated to match(es) played on unknown. Source: rsssf.com
Rules for classification: 1) points; 2) goal difference; 3) number of goals scored.
(C) Champions; (R) Relegated

==== Results summary ====
Overall								Home						Away					
Pld	W	D	L	GF	GA	GD	Pts	W	D	L	GF	GA	GD	W	D	L	GF	GA	GD
30	13	13	4	41	27	+14	52	11	2	2	25	10	+15	2	11	2	16	17	−1

Source: worldfootball.net

==== Results by round ====
Round	1	2	3	4	5	6	7	8	9	11	10	12	14	15	16	17	18	19	20	21	22	23	24	25	13	26	27	28	29	30
Ground	H	A	H	A	H	A	H	A	H	A	A	H	H	A	H	A	H	A	H	A	H	A	H	H	A	A	H	A	H	A
Result	W	D	W	W	W	D	W	D	W	D	W	D	L	D	D	D	W	L	W	D	W	D	W	W	D	L	L	D	W	D
Position	4	3	3	3	1	1	1	1	1	1	1	1	1	2	1	2	2	3	2	2	2	2	1	1	1	2	2	2	2	2
Points	2	3	5	7	9	10	12	13	15	16	18	19	19	20	21	22	24	24	26	27	29	30	32	34	35	35	35	36	38	39

Source: worldfootball.net
A = Away; H = Home; W = Win; D = Draw; L = Loss

==== Matches ====
Win Draw Loss

15 February 1981 1	South Melbourne	1–0	Marconi Fairfield	Melbourne
	Evans 39'	Report		Stadium: Middle Park Soccer Stadium; Attendance: 5,500; Referee: Chris Bambridge

22 February 1981 2	Sydney Olympic	2–2	South Melbourne	Sydney
	Laing 38'; Koussas 43'	Report	Christopoulos 24', 61' (pen.)	Stadium: St George Stadium; Attendance: 4,813; Referee: Henry Witschge

1 March 1981 3	South Melbourne	2–1	Heidelberg United	Melbourne
	Buljevic 13'; Xanthopoulos 83'	Report	Paton 46'	Stadium: Middle Park Soccer Stadium; Attendance: 12,500; Referee: Jack Johnston

8 March 1981 4	Footscray JUST	1–2	South Melbourne	Melbourne
	Ilioski 11'	Report	Christopoulos 20'; Evans 68'	Stadium: Schintler Reserve; Attendance: 5,890; Referee: David Yelland

15 March 1981 5	South Melbourne	1–0	Brisbane Lions	Melbourne
	Cummings 83'	Report		Stadium: Middle Park Soccer Stadium; Attendance: 5,000; Referee: Jim Fearn

28 March 1981 6	Blacktown City	2–2	South Melbourne	Sydney
	Culina 33'; Cuk 65'	Report	Evans 9'; Cummings 86'	Stadium: Gabbie Stadium; Attendance: 2,451; Referee: Tim Davies

5 April 1981 7	South Melbourne	2–0	Newcastle KB United	Melbourne
	Davidson 21' (pen.); Stevenson 66'	Report		Stadium: Middle Park; Attendance: 6,888; Referee: Stewart Mellings

12 April 1981 8	APIA Leichhardt	1–1	South Melbourne	Sydney
15:00 AEST	O'Connor 56'	Report	Evans 75'	Stadium: Lambert Park; Attendance: 4,382; Referee: Peter Rampley

19 April 1981 9	South Melbourne	1–0	Wollongong City	Melbourne
	Stevenson 72'	Report		Stadium: Middle Park; Attendance: 7,000; Referee: Chris Bambridge

3 May 1981 11	Preston Makedonia	1–1	South Melbourne	Melbourne
	Little 89'	Report	Buljevic 42'	Stadium: B.T. Connor Reserve; Attendance: 6,000; Referee: Don Campbell

6 May 1981 10	West Adelaide	0–2	South Melbourne	Adelaide
		Report	Christopoulos 49', 58'	Stadium: Hindmarsh Stadium; Attendance: 1,890; Referee: Jim Rossis

10 May 1981 12	South Melbourne	0–0	Adelaide City	Melbourne
		Report		Stadium: Middle Park Soccer Stadium; Attendance: 4,000; Referee: Chris Bambridge

24 May 1981 14	South Melbourne	1–3	Sydney City	Melbourne
	Evans 59'	Report	Bruce 49'; Boden 64', 86'	Stadium: Middle Park Soccer Stadium; Attendance: 8,000; Referee: Bobby Kerr

31 May 1981 15	Canberra City	2–2	South Melbourne	Canberra
	Maclaren 24'; Brennan 36'	Report	Christopoulos 24' (pen.); Blair 70'	Stadium: Bruce Stadium; Attendance: 6,247; Referee: Bob Mee

7 June 1981 16	South Melbourne	1–1	Sydney Olympic	Melbourne
	Evans 23'	Report	Raskopoulos 28'	Stadium: Middle Park Soccer Stadium; Attendance: 12,000; Referee: Don Campbell

14 June 1981 17	Heidelberg United	0–0	South Melbourne	Melbourne
		Report		Stadium: Olympic Park; Attendance: 3,241; Referee: Peter Rampley

21 June 1981 18	South Melbourne	2–1	Footscray JUST	Melbourne
	Wooddin 30'; Christopoulos 40' (pen.)	Report	Verweij 90'	Stadium: Middle Park Soccer Stadium; Attendance: 4,500; Referee: Jim Fearn

28 June 1981 19	Brisbane Lions	2–0	South Melbourne	Brisbane
	Daunt 23'; Latchford 61'	Report		Stadium: Richlands Stadium; Attendance: 3,000; Referee: Dave Nugent

5 July 1981 20	South Melbourne	2–1	Blacktown City	Melbourne
	Hormazabal 62' (o.g.); Bannon 70'	Report	Jones 79'	Stadium: Middle Park Soccer Stadium; Attendance: 4,000; Referee: Dennis Yelland

12 July 1981 21	Newcastle KB United	0–0	South Melbourne	Newcastle
14:30 AEST		Report		Stadium: Newcastle International Sports Centre; Attendance: 6,099; Referee: Alf Rodway

19 July 1981 22	South Melbourne	4–1	APIA Leichhardt	Melbourne
	Wooddin 29'; Evans 30', 41', 65'	Report	Butler 73'	Stadium: Middle Park Soccer Stadium; Attendance: 6,000; Referee: Stewart Mellings

26 July 1981 23	Wollongong City	1–1	South Melbourne	Wollongong
	de Graaf 8'	Report	Cummings 40'	Stadium: Wollongong Showground; Attendance: 4,723; Referee: Doug Rennie

2 August 1981 24	South Melbourne	5–0	West Adelaide	Melbourne
	Blair 3'; Evans 18', 26', 61'; Stevenson 46'	Report		Stadium: Middle Park Soccer Stadium; Attendance: 4,000; Referee: Dennis Voutsinas

9 August 1981 25	South Melbourne	2–0	Preston Makedonia	Melbourne
	Evans 49'; Shirra 71'	Report		Stadium: Middle Park Soccer Stadium; Attendance: 11,759; Referee: Jim Fearn

12 August 1981 13	Brisbane City	1–1	South Melbourne	Brisbane
	Kelso 20'	Report	Xanthopoulos 84'	Stadium: Spencer Park; Attendance: 1,500; Referee: Dave Nugent

16 August 1981 26	Adelaide City	2–0	South Melbourne	Adelaide
	Northcote 61'; Perin 80' (pen.)	Report		Stadium: Olympic Sports Field; Attendance: 5,100; Referee: Peter Rampley

23 August 1981 27	South Melbourne	0–2	Brisbane City	Melbourne
		Report	Conner 39'; Wilkinson 54'	Stadium: Middle Park Soccer Stadium; Attendance: 7,000; Referee: Chris Bambridge

30 August 1981 28	Sydney City	1–1	South Melbourne	Sydney
15:00 AEST	Souness 66'	Report	Wooddin 46'	Stadium: ES Marks Athletics Field; Attendance: 4,217; Referee: Dave Nugent

6 September 1981 29	South Melbourne	1–0	Canberra City	Melbourne
	Evans 55' (pen.)	Report		Stadium: Middle Park Soccer Stadium; Attendance: 4,000; Referee: Evan Venios

13 September 1981 30	Marconi Fairfield	1–1	South Melbourne	Sydney
	Krncevic 50'	Report	Buljevic 42'	Stadium: Marconi Stadium; Attendance: 2,745; Referee: Don Campbell

=== NSL Cup ===
Win Draw Loss

11 March 1981 First round	Heidelberg United	2–0	South Melbourne	Melbourne
	Bozikas 52'; Selemidis 71'	Report		Stadium: Olympic Park; Attendance: 6,300; Referee: Dennis Voutsinas

== Statistics ==
=== Appearances and goals ===
Includes all competitions. Players with no appearances not included in the list.

No.	Pos.	Nat.	Player	National Soccer League		NSL Cup		Total	
No.	Pos.	Nat.	Player	Apps	Goals	Apps	Goals	Apps	Goals
1	GK	(Australia)	Peter Laumets	30	0	1	0	31	0
2	DF	(Scotland)	Vince Bannon	29	1	1	0	30	1
3	DF	(Australia)	Alan Davidson	24	1	1	0	25	1
4	DF	(Australia)	Bertie Lutton	9+5	0	0	0	14	0
5	DF	(Australia)	Arthur Xanthopoulos	26	2	1	0	27	2
6	MF	(Australia)	Billy Rogers	23+2	0	1	0	26	0
8	MF	(Australia)	George Christopoulos	14+3	7	1	0	18	7
9	FW	(Australia)	Duncan Cummings	14+7	3	0+1	0	22	3
10	FW	(England)	Alun Evans	27	14	1	0	28	14
11	FW	(Australia)	Branko Buljevic	26+2	3	1	0	29	3
13	FW	(Australia)	Steve Wooddin	14	3	0	0	14	3
14	FW	(Scotland)	George Campbell	10+3	0	0	0	13	0
15	MF	(Australia)	John Stevenson	30	3	1	0	31	3
16	MF	(Scotland)	Jim Shirra	26	1	1	0	27	1
19	DF	(Australia)	Steve Blair	25	2	1	0	26	2
—	MF	(Australia)	Socrates Nicolaides	3	0	0	0	3	0

=== Disciplinary record ===
Includes all competitions. The list is sorted by squad number when total cards are equal. Players with no cards not included in the list.

Rank	No.	Pos.	Nat.	Player	National Soccer League			NSL Cup			Total		
Rank	No.	Pos.	Nat.	Player	Yellow card	Second yellow card	Red card	Yellow card	Second yellow card	Red card	Yellow card	Second yellow card	Red card
1	10	FW	(England)	Alun Evans	6	0	0	0	0	0	6	0	0
2	16	MF	(Scotland)	Jim Shirra	5	0	0	0	0	0	5	0	0
3	2	DF	(Scotland)	Vince Bannon	4	0	0	0	0	0	4	0	0
4	6	MF	(Australia)	Billy Rogers	3	0	0	0	0	0	3	0	0
5	3	DF	(Australia)	Alan Davidson	2	0	0	0	0	0	2	0	0
5	4	DF	(Australia)	Bertie Lutton	2	0	0	0	0	0	2	0	0
7	9	FW	(Australia)	Duncan Cummings	1	0	0	0	0	0	1	0	0
7	13	FW	(Australia)	Steve Wooddin	1	0	0	0	0	0	1	0	0
Total					24	0	0	0	0	0	24	0	0

=== Clean sheets ===
Includes all competitions. The list is sorted by squad number when total clean sheets are equal. Numbers in parentheses represent games where both goalkeepers participated and both kept a clean sheet; the number in parentheses is awarded to the goalkeeper who was substituted on, whilst a full clean sheet is awarded to the goalkeeper who was on the field at the start of play. Goalkeepers with no clean sheets not included in the list.

Rank	No.	Nat.	Goalkeeper	NSL	NSL Cup	Total
1	1	(Australia)	Peter Laumets	11	0	11
Total				11	0	11
