= 1978 NSL Cup =

National Soccer League Cup

Tournament details
- Country: Australia
- Dates: 10 May – 8 October 1978
- Teams: 32

Final positions
- Champions: Brisbane City (2nd title)
- Runners-up: Adelaide City

Tournament statistics
- Matches played: 31
- Goals scored: 90 (2.9 per match)
- Attendance: 67,312 (2,171 per match)
- Top goal scorer(s): Branko Culina; Barry Kelso (4 goals each)

The 1978 NSL Cup was the second edition of the NSL Cup, which was the main national association football knockout cup competition in Australia. The competition was known as the Philips Cup under a sponsorship arrangement with Dutch company Philips.

Defending champions Brisbane City defeated Adelaide City 2–1 in the final to win their second and back-to-back NSL Cup title.

== Teams ==
The NSL Cup was a knockout competition with 32 teams taking part all trying to reach the Final in October 1978. The competition consisted of the 14 teams from the National Soccer League plus 18 teams from their respective top division state leagues.

Round	Main date	Number of fixtures	Clubs remaining
First round	Wednesday 24 May 1978	16	32 → 16
Second round	Wednesday 19 July 1978	8	16 → 8
Quarter-finals	Sunday 24 September 1978	4	8 → 4
Semi-finals	Sunday 1 October 1978	2	4 → 2
Final	Sunday 24 September 1978	1	2 → 1

== Bracket ==
Round of 32
Brisbane City	1
St. George-Souths	0
Brisbane Lions	7
Annerley	0
Southside Eagles	1
Eastern Suburbs Hakoah	2
Sydney Olympic	2
Auburn	0
Weston Bears	1
Newcastle KB United	2
Marconi	0 (3)
Sydney Croatia (p)	0 (4)
Western Suburbs	2
Sutherland	0
St. George	2
APIA Leichhardt	1
Beograd Woodville	2
Eastern Districts Azzurri	1
White Eagles	0
Essendon Croatia	2
Adelaide City	5
Noarlunga United	0
Ascot	1
West Adelaide	4
George Cross	1
Juventus	0
Canberra City	4
West Woden Juventus	0
Fitzroy United	6
Prahan Slavia	3
Footscray JUST	1
South Melbourne	2

Round of 16
Brisbane City (p)	0 (5)
Brisbane Lions	0 (4)
Eastern Suburbs Hakoah	4
Sydney Olympic	0
Newcastle KB United	2
Sydney Croatia	0
Western Suburbs	1
St. George	0
Beograd Woodville	0
Essendon Croatia	5
Adelaide City	1
West Adelaide	0
George Cross	2
Canberra City	3
Fitzroy United (a.e.t.)	2
South Melbourne	1

Quarterfinals
Brisbane City	3
Eastern Suburbs Hakoah	0
Newcastle KB United	1
Western Suburbs	0
Essendon Croatia	0
Adelaide City	1
Canberra City (p)	1 (5)
Fitzroy United	1 (4)

Semifinals
Brisbane City (a.e.t.)	2
Newcastle KB United	0
Adelaide City	3
Canberra City	1

Finals
Brisbane City	2
Adelaide City	1

== First round ==
10 May 1978	Canberra City (1)	4–0	West Woden Juventus (2)	Queanbeyan
	Henderson 51', 57', ?'; Grujicic ?'	Report		Stadium: Seiffert Oval

10 May 1978	White Eagles (2)	0–2	Essendon Croatia (2)	Hobart
		Report	Sikora 56' (o.g.); Culina 61' (pen.)	Attendance: 900; Referee: Ron Proctor

17 May 1978	Fitzroy United (1)	6–3	Prahran Slavia (2)	Melbourne
20:45 AEST	Bozikas 25', 44', 53'; Campbell 71', 79'; Cole 72'	Report	Miller 30'; Paton 67'; Train 90'	Stadium: Olympic Park Stadium

17 May 1978	George Cross (2)	1–0	Juventus (2)	Melbourne
18:45 AEST	Cullen 2'	Report		Stadium: Olympic Park Stadium

17 May 1978	St George (1)	2–1	APIA Leichhardt (2)	Sydney
20:00 AEST	J. O'Shea 35'; Hensman 84'	Report	Jack 77'	Stadium: Garside Park; Attendance: 722

17 May 1978	Weston Bears (2)	1–2	Newcastle KB United (1)	Weston
	JJ. Turnbull 12'	Report	Drinkwater 58'; Summerscales 68'	Stadium: Weston Park; Attendance: 1,500; Referee: Alf Rodway

24 May 1978	Adelaide City (1)	5–0	Noarlunga United (2)	Adelaide
	J. Nyskohus 22'; B. Nyskohus 49'; Fyffe 53'; Kosmina 66'; Marocchi 82'	Report		Stadium: Hindmarsh Stadium

24 May 1978	Ascot (2)	1–4	West Adelaide (1)	Perth
	Jones 31' (o.g.)	Report	Honeyman 30', 86'; McGregor 55'; Norris 85'	Stadium: Litis Stadium

24 May 1978	Beograd Woodville (2)	2–1	Eastern Districts Azzurri (2)	Adelaide
	Jankovic 6'; Kamleitner 11'	Report	Russo 86'	Stadium: Hindmarsh Stadium

24 May 1978	Brisbane Lions (1)	7–0	Annerley (2)	Brisbane
	Laszlo ?', ?'; Spearritt ?'; Fairbrother ?'; Morris ?'; Amos 35+'; Ontong 55+'	Report		Stadium: Perry Park

24 May 1978	Sydney Olympic (1)	2–0	Auburn (2)	Sydney
	Laing 45'; Allan 68'	Report		Stadium: Garside Park; Attendance: 1,000

24 May 1978	Western Suburbs (1)	2–0	Sutherland (2)	Sydney
	Eaton 20'; Stone 32'	Report		Stadium: Garside Park; Attendance: 1,000

31 May 1978	Footscray JUST (1)	1–2	South Melbourne (1)	Melbourne
	Ristovski ?'	Report	Rogers 27'; Lutton 57'	Stadium: Olympic Park Stadium; Attendance: 3,000

31 May 1978	Southside Eagles (2)	1–2	Eastern Suburbs Hakoah (1)	Brisbane
	Millman 37'	Report	Thomson 50'; Watson 83'	Stadium: Perry Park; Referee: Dave Nugent

14 June 1978	Brisbane City (1)	1–0	St George-Souths (2)	Brisbane
	Coyne 16'	Report		Stadium: Perry Park; Referee: Jack Wood

21 June 1978	Marconi (1)	0–0 (3–4 p)	Sydney Croatia (2)	Sydney
		Report		Stadium: Marconi Oval; Attendance: 4,175; Referee: Tim Davies

== Second round ==
19 July 1978	Adelaide City (1)	1–0	West Adelaide (1)	Adelaide
	Marwe 76'	Report		Stadium: Hindmarsh Stadium; Attendance: 6,856; Referee: Graham Neal

19 July 1978	Brisbane City (1)	0–0 (5–4 p)	Brisbane Lions (1)	Brisbane
		Report		Stadium: Perry Park; Referee: Dave Nugent

19 July 1978	Eastern Suburbs Hakoah (1)	4–0	Sydney Olympic (1)	Sydney
	Souness 17'; Barnes 21'; Smith 68', 73'	Report		Stadium: Wentworth Park; Attendance: 1,023; Referee: Tim Davies

19 July 1978	Western Suburbs (1)	1–0	St George (1)	Sydney
	Eaton 4'	Report		Stadium: Wentworth Park; Attendance: 1,023; Referee: Henry Witschge

26 July 1978	Beograd Woodville (2)	0–5	Essendon Croatia (2)	Adelaide
		Report	Culina 45', 52', 63'; Gilder 69'; Davidson 79'	Stadium: Hindmarsh Stadium; Attendance: 1,500; Referee: Dennis Stanley

2 August 1978	Fitzroy United (1)	2–1 (a.e.t.)	South Melbourne (1)	Melbourne
	Buljevic 88'; Taylor 110'	Report	Cummigs 89'	Stadium: Olympic Park Stadium; Attendance: 8,000; Referee: Chris Bambridge

2 August 1978	George Cross (1)	2–3	Canberra City (1)	Melbourne
	Paparas 26'; Reed 65'	Report	Davies 42'; Byrne 62'; Grujicic 70'	Stadium: Olympic Park Stadium; Attendance: 8,000; Referee: Chris Bambridge

2 August 1978	Newcastle KB United (1)	2–0	Sydney Croatia (2)	Newcastle
	Galpin 38'; Boden 51'	Report		Stadium: Newcastle International Sports Centre; Attendance: 3,544; Referee: Bill Jones

== Quarter-finals ==
3 September 1978	Newcastle KB United (1)	1–0	Western Suburbs (1)	Newcastle
	Tredinnick 86'	Report		Stadium: Newcastle International Sports Centre; Attendance: 6,417; Referee: Jack Wood

24 September 1978	Brisbane City (1)	3–0	Eastern Suburbs Hakoah (1)	Brisbane
	Caldwell 48' (pen.); Kelso 82', ?'	Report		Stadium: Perry Park; Attendance: 1,500; Referee: Stewart Mellings

24 September 1978	Canberra City (1)	1–1 (5–4 p)	Fitzroy United (1)	Canberra
	Cant 45'	Report	Cole ?'	Stadium: Canberra Stadium

24 September 1978	Essendon Croatia (2)	0–1	Adelaide City (1)	Melbourne
		Report	J. Nyskohus 83'	Stadium: Olympic Park Stadium; Attendance: 5,000; Referee: Richard Lorenc

== Semi-finals ==
1 October 1978	Adelaide City (1)	3–1	Canberra City (1)	Adelaide
	Marwe 8'; Muniz 52', 89'	Report	Stoddart 4'	Stadium: Olympic Sports Field; Attendance: 2,651; Referee: Tim Davies

1 October 1978	Brisbane City (1)	2–0 (a.e.t.)	Newcastle KB United (1)	Brisbane
	Caldwell 105' (pen.); Kelso 119'	Report		Stadium: Perry Park; Attendance: 3,000; Referee: Henry Witschge

== Final ==
8 October 1978

Brisbane City	2–1	Adelaide City
Kelso 28'; Pimblett 77'	Report	Zoran Matić 31'

Perry Park, Brisbane
Attendance: 4,964
Referee: Tony Boskovic

== Top scorers ==
Rank	Player	Club	Goals
1	(Australia) Branko Culina	Essendon Croatia	4
1	(Australia) Barry Kelso	Brisbane City	4
3	(Australia) Andy Bozikas	Fitzroy United	3
3	(Australia) Tony Henderson	Canberra City	3
