= Ian MacGregor (disambiguation) =

Sir Ian MacGregor (1912–1998) was a Scottish-American metallurgist and industrialist

Ian MacGregor, Macgregor or McGregor may also refer to:

- Ian McGregor (malariologist) (1922–2007)
- Ian McGregor (Australian footballer) (born 1942), Australian rules footballer
- Ian McGregor (Scottish footballer) (born 1953)
- Ian Macgregor (born c. 1937), British investment executive and chartered accountant
- Ian MacGregor (journalist), British newspaper editor
- Ian MacGregor (cyclist) (born 1983), American professional road racing
- Ian MacGregor (rugby union) (1931–2016), Scottish rugby union player
