= Ian MacGregor (rugby union) =

Scottish rugby player (1931–2016)

- Born: Ian Allan Alexander MacGregor; 9 August 1931 Glasgow, Scotland
- Died: 29 November 2016 (aged 85) Kilmarnock, Scotland

Rugby union career
- Position: Flanker
Amateur team(s)
Years	Team	Apps	(Points)
1955	Hillhead HSFP		
1955-57	Llanelli		
1957-	Hillhead HSFP		
Provincial / State sides
Years	Team	Apps	(Points)
1954-	Glasgow District		
1954	Whites Trial		
1954	Scotland Probables		
1956	Carmarthenshire County		
International career
Years	Team	Apps	(Points)
1955-57	Scotland	9	(0)

Ian MacGregor (9 August 1931 – 29 November 2016) was a Scotland international rugby union player.

== Rugby Union career ==
=== Amateur career ===
MacGregor played for Hillhead HSFP.

He then moved to play for Llanelli in 1955–56.

On his return to Scotland in 1957, he resumed playing with Hillhead HSFP.

=== Provincial career ===
He played for Glasgow District from 1954.

He played for Whites Trial against Blues Trial on 27 November 1954.

He was promoted to play for Scotland Probables against Scotland Possibles on 18 December 1954.

While in Wales he played for Carmarthenshire County.

=== International career ===
He played for Scotland 9 times from 1955 to 1957.

=== Administrative career ===
He became an administrator for Glasgow District. It was said that he and Dr. Ian Scott effectively ran the District side for many years.

He moved on to an administrative role for the Scottish Rugby Union. He was Convenor of the selection committee when Scotland won the Grand Slam in 1984. He resigned from that committee in 1989.

== Teaching career ==
He took a teaching post at The Glasgow Academy in 1957 and remained there till his retirement in 1991.

== Family ==
Ian MacGregor was survived by Helen, his wife of over 50 years. They had a daughter Sheila and sons Calum and Graeme who both played for Glasgow Academicals. With grandchildren Katie, Fiona, Alastair and Jennifer. Calum MacGregor also played for Glasgow Warriors.

== Death ==
He had moved to Lamlash in Arran in retirement. On his final illness he was moved to Crosshouse Hospital in Kilmarnock.
