= Kevin J. Mullen =

American writer (1935–2011)

Kevin J. Mullen (October 7, 1935 in San Francisco – April 18, 2011 in Novato, California) was an American crime writer.

== Life ==
Mulen served in the 82nd Airborne Division. He served with the San Francisco Police Department, from 1959 to 1985, reaching the rank of deputy chief. He has written in magazines and newspapers (The San Francisco Chronicle) on criminal justice issues.

== Awards ==
- 2006 American Book Award

== Works ==
- SFPD Homicide Case Fil e: Introduction for The Body in the Bay, produced by Paul Drexler and Julie Marsh
- Let Justice Be Done: Crime and Politics in Early San Francisco. University of Nevada Press. July 1995. ISBN 0-87417-146-6.
- Dangerous Strangers: Minority Newcomers and Criminal Violence in the Urban West, 1850-2000. Palgrave Macmillan. August 2005. ISBN 1-4039-6978-7.
- The Toughest Gang in Town: Police Stories From Old San Francisco. Noir Publications. July 2005. ISBN 0-926664-09-3.
- Chinatown Squad: Policing the Dragon From the Gold Rush to the 21st Century. Noir Publications. August 2008. ISBN 978-0-926664-10-4.

=== Newspaper columns ===
- Mullen, Kevin (April 5, 1996). "The high-speed chase syndrome". The San Francisco Chronicle.
- "The Zebra Murders: An Alternative Perspective", The San Francisco Chronicle
- Mullen, Kevin J. (September 11, 2005). "The dark days after the 1906 earthquake: New Orleans' chaos echoes S.F. violence". The San Francisco Chronicle.

=== Memoir ===
- The Egg Man's Son. Virtualbookworm.com Publishing, Incorporated. September 2009. ISBN 978-1-60264-463-2.
