= Ian McGregor (Australian footballer) =

Australian rules footballer

Personal information
- Full name: Ian McGregor
- Born: 27 March 1942 (age 84)
- Original team: Bendigo YCW
- Height: 184 cm (6 ft 0 in)
- Weight: 76 kg (168 lb)

Playing career^{1}
Years	Club	Games (Goals)
1961, 1964	North Melbourne	2 (0)
- ^{1} Playing statistics correct to the end of 1964.

Ian McGregor (born 27 March 1942) is a former Australian rules footballer who played with North Melbourne in the Victorian Football League (VFL).
