= Steve Blair =

Australian soccer player

Steve Blair (born 28 December 1961) is an Australian former soccer player who played for South Melbourne in the National Soccer League (NSL) and played 13 times for the Australia national soccer team.
