= Bobby McGuinness =

Scottish footballer

Personal information
- Full name: Robert Francis McGuinness
- Date of birth: 29 January 1954 (age 72)
- Place of birth: Motherwell, Scotland
- Position: Forward

Senior career*
| Years | Team | Apps | (Gls) |
- Lesmahagow
| 1973–1975 | Motherwell | 8 | (0) |
| 1975–1976 | Portsmouth | 30 | (3) |
| 1977 | St Johnstone | 3 | (0) |
- Hakoah Sydney City East
| Total | | 42 | (3) |
- * Club domestic league appearances and goals

Robert Francis McGuinness (born 29 January 1954) is a Scottish former footballer, who played as a forward for Lesmahagow, Motherwell, Portsmouth and St Johnstone.
