= Harry Mowbray =

Scottish footballer (1947–2022)

Personal information
- Full name: Henry Mowbray
- Date of birth: 1 May 1947
- Place of birth: Hamilton, Scotland
- Date of death: 8 July 2022 (aged 75)
- Position: Defender

Youth career
- –1966: Blairhall Colliery

Senior career*
Years	Team	Apps	(Gls)
1966–1967	Cowdenbeath	20	(1)
1967–1971	Blackpool	91	(0)
1971–1973	Bolton Wanderers	31	(0)
1973–1974	St Mirren	18	(0)
1974–1978	Eastern Suburbs Hakoah	51+	(1+)
Total		111+	(2+)
- * Club domestic league appearances and goals

Henry Mowbray (1 May 1947 – 8 July 2022) was a Scottish professional footballer who played as a defender.

== Career ==
Mowbray was recruited from Blairhall Colliery in junior football before being signed by Cowdenbeath in 1966. After one season with the Blue Brazil, he moved south to join Stan Mortensen's Blackpool, signing for them on his 20th birthday. He made his debut for the Tangerines on 29 August 1967 in a 1–1 draw at Ipswich Town in the league, replacing the injured Bill Bentley. He went on to make a further 26 league appearances in the 1967–68 campaign, playing alongside Jimmy Armfield.

After sitting out the majority of the 1968–69 season (with Bill Bentley taking over his left-back role), he made only twelve league starts.

The following season, 1969–70, saw him edge back in front of Bentley. He made 26 league appearances that season and also in 1970–71. He scored his first goal for the club in their FA Cup third-round win against West Ham at Bloomfield Road on 2 January 1971.

At the end of the season, after Blackpool had been relegated to Division Two, new manager Bob Stokoe made it clear that he was going to favour Bentley at left-back, and so Mowbray departed the seaside.

Jimmy Armfield, now manager at Bolton Wanderers, re-signed the Scot, and he made 31 league appearances for the Trotters in two years.

In 1973, Mowbray returned to Scotland to sign for St Mirren for the 1973–74 season. He then played in Australia, joining Eastern Suburbs Hakoah in 1974. He played in Hakoah's first two seasons in the National Soccer League in 1977 and 1978.

He died on 8 July 2022.
