= Alan Kershaw =

English footballer

Personal information
- Full name: Alan Derek Kershaw
- Date of birth: 23 April 1954 (age 72)
- Place of birth: Southport, Merseyside, England
- Position: Full-back

Senior career*
Years	Team	Apps	(Gls)
1972–1974	Preston North End	0	(0)
1974–1975	Southport	24	(0)
1975	Dundee United		
1976–1977	Hakoah Sydney City East		
1980	IFK Malmö		
1982	Formby		
1984	Leyland Motors		
1986	Greaves Hall		
1986	Fleetwood Hesketh		
- * Club domestic league appearances and goals

Alan Derek Kershaw (born 23 April 1954) is an English former footballer who played for Southport in The Football League.

== Playing career ==
After serving as an apprentice with Preston North End, Kershaw moved to Southport. At Southport, he played 24 times.
