= Todd Clarke =

Australian soccer player

Personal information
- Date of birth: 28 August 1951 (age 75)

Senior career*
Years	Team	Apps	(Gls)
- Adelaide Beograd
1976	Hakoah		

International career
1975–1978	Australia MNT	21	
- * Club domestic league appearances and goals

Todd Clarke (born 28 April 1951) is an Australian former association football player.

== Playing career ==
=== Club career ===
Clarke played in the South Australian state league for Adelaide Beograd before moving to Sydney where he played for NSW state league team Hakoah in 1976. He continued with the club, renamed Sydney City, as they joined the then-new National Soccer League in 1977.

=== International career ===
Playing against China in 1975, Clarke made the first of 21 full international appearances for Australia. His last match was in Sydney against Greece in 1978.
