= Steve O'Connor =

Australian soccer player

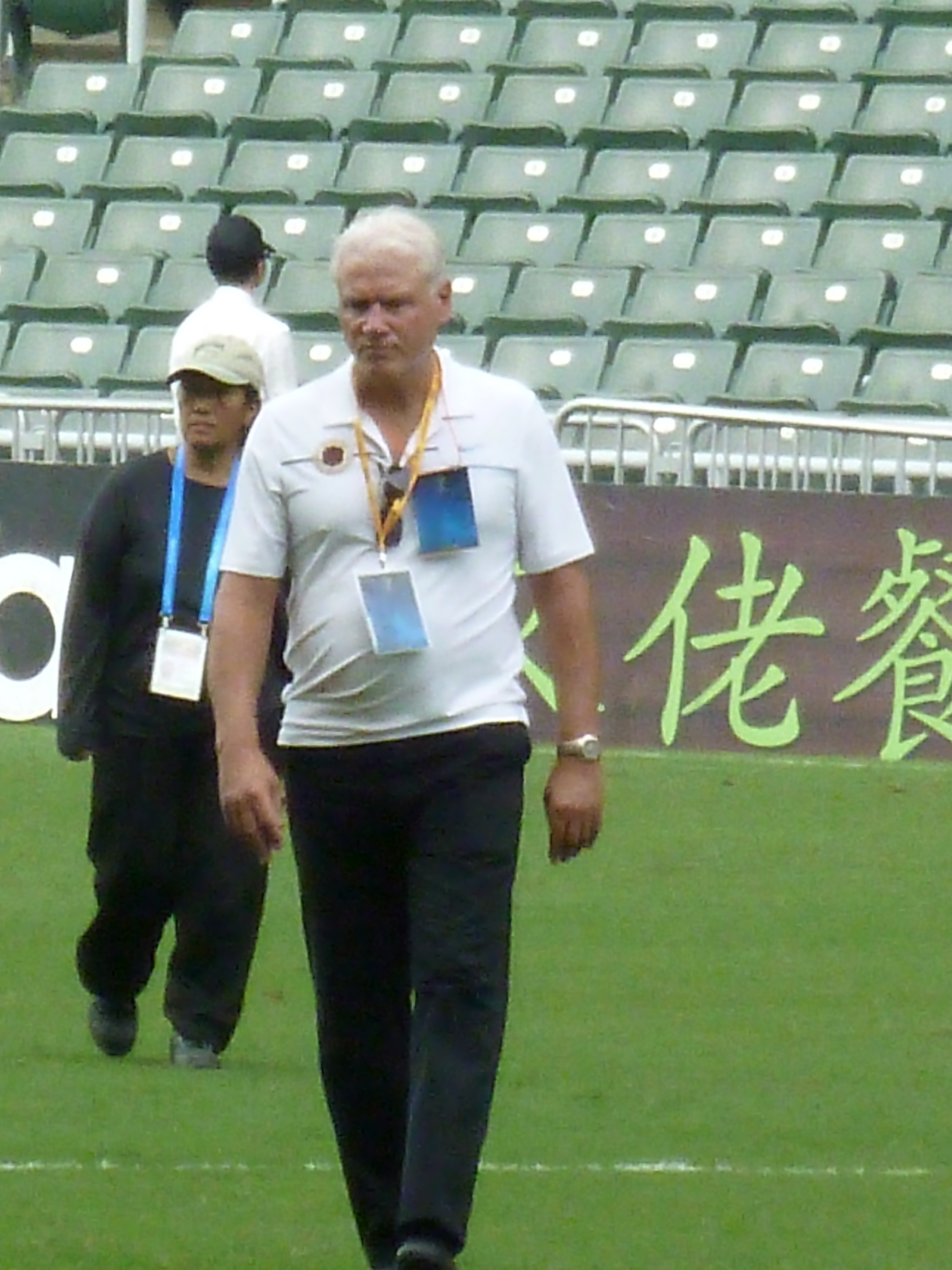

Personal information
- Date of birth: 24 November 1954 (age 71)
- Position: Defender

Senior career*
Years	Team	Apps	(Gls)
1977-1987	Sydney City		
1987-1988	St George FC		
1989	APIA Leichhardt FC		

International career
1979-1985	Australia	44	(3)

Managerial career
- 1996-2008: AIS
- 2007-2008: Australia U20
- 2008-2011: Sydney FC Youth
- 2012-2013: Central Coast Mariners Academy
- * Club domestic league appearances and goals

Steve O'Connor played 290 games in the Australian National Soccer League (NSL) and represented Australia in the national team with 44 Socceroo appearances.

== Background ==
Stephen (Steve) joined Revesby Rovers as a 7-year-old and played representative soccer for Bankstown at 8 years old and in consecutive years up until the age of 15. He was then chosen in the New South Wales team at 16 and also played 1st grade for Bankstown the same year. During this time O'Connor also played representative basketball and had to make a decision on which sport to concentrate on, choosing soccer.

He then joined the Hakoah Club making his 1st grade appearance as a 17-year-old in a team with such players as John Watkiss, Danny Walsh, Ray Baartz, Alan Marnoch and Jimmy Mackay. O'Connor played 290 games in the Australian National Soccer League (NSL). He played with Sydney City for 15 years in which time the club won 4 national titles. When the club folded in 1987, O'Connor was signed by St George FC and went on to win another NSL championship.

== International career ==
O'Connor represented Australia with 44 Socceroos appearances, scoring 3 goals.

== Coaching career ==
=== Australian Institute of Sport ===
In 1990 O'Connor was appointed assistant coach at the AIS men's football program where he coached Mark Viduka, Josip Skoko, Josip Simunic, Craig Moore, Kevin Muscat, Lucas Neill, Hayden Foxe, John Aloisi, and Clint Bolton. During this time he completed the level 3 coaching accreditation and the AIS High Performance Coaching Diploma.

=== Soccer NSW ===
From 1994 to 1996, O'Connor became technical director of Soccer NSW. He started the NTC development program and zone program concept of which he was head coach and included a young Brett Emerton and Harry Kewell.

=== Australian Institute of Sport ===
Steve was Head Coach of the AIS Men's Football Program for 12 years. During that time he was assistant coach with the U/17, U/20 and U/23 National Teams at various times and also the U/20 National Coach Between 1996 and 2008 Steve brought into the AIS and further developed Vince Grella, Mark Bresciano, Simon Colosimo, Josh Kennedy, Brett Emerton, Carl Valeri, James Holland, Billy Celevski, Nick Ward, Stu Musialik, Alex Brosque, Jobe Wheelhouse, Luke Wilkshire, Ljubo Milicevic, Michael Marrone, Nikolai Topor Stanley, Nathan Burns, Evan Berger, Kofi Danning, Rhyan Grant, Nikita Rukavytsya, Sebastian Ryall, Tando Velapi, Jimmy Downey and Mitchell Langerak. During this time, O'Connor received his community accreditation senior licence and advanced accreditation A licence.

=== Australia U-20 ===
Steve took the team to the first round of Asian qualifiers for the Youth World Cup

=== Sydney FC ===
In 2008 he resigned from the AIS to join Sydney FC as Technical Director and Youth Coach. The youth team won the inaugural National Youth League title and Grand Final, on top of this, five players from the youth team progressed to the U/20 National Team and received senior A League contracts.

"I love helping serious young footballers not only improve their performance but understand what commitment it takes to make it as a professional footballer." The one thing that stands out about all the players mentioned above is not only were they talented but they always wanted to improve and work on their game. Once they understood how, they would constantly evaluate their performance for improvement. The whole process of developing them became very cooperative between the coaching staff and the player. They would set the standards.

=== Hong Kong Football Association ===
On 17 April 2012, the Hong Kong Football Association announced that O'Connor would join as Technical Director, which he started in early May. He was tasked with improving the standards of local coaching, referee development, community and youth football activities and women's football. He also oversaw the implementation of elite player development pathways from grassroots football to senior international level.

== Australian Football Hall of Fame ==
In 2003, O'Connor was inducted into the Australian Football Hall of Fame, which was established in 1999 to pay tribute to Australia's football greats and to recognise exceptional achievements of players, coaches, referees, administrators, and media representatives.
