= Terry Smith (footballer, born 1951) =

English footballer

Personal information
- Full name: Terence Peter Smith
- Date of birth: 10 September 1951 (age 75)
- Place of birth: Cheltenham, England
- Position: Forward

Senior career*
Years	Team	Apps	(Gls)
1970–1973	Stoke City	4	(1)
1972–1973	→ Shrewsbury Town (loan)	2	(0)
1973–1974	Western Suburbs		
1974–1975	St George Budapest		
1975–1982	Hakoah Eastern Suburbs		
- * Club domestic league appearances and goals

Terence Peter "Terry" Smith (born 10 September 1951) is an English former footballer who played in the Football League for Stoke City and Shrewsbury Town.

== Career ==
Smith was born in Cheltenham and joined Stoke City's youth team as an apprentice. He played three matches during the 1970–71 season scoring once away at Chelsea. He played once the following season and had a short spell on loan at Shrewsbury Town in 1972. At the end of the season he was released and he emigrated to Australia and played for Western Suburbs, St George Budapest and Hakoah Eastern Suburbs.

== Career statistics ==
Appearances and goals by club, season and competition
Club	Season	League			FA Cup		League Cup		Total	
Club	Season	Division	Apps	Goals	Apps	Goals	Apps	Goals	Apps	Goals
Stoke City	1970–71	First Division	3	1	0	0	0	0	3	1
Stoke City	1971–72	First Division	1	0	0	0	0	0	1	0
Stoke City	Total		4	1	0	0	0	0	4	1
Shrewsbury Town (loan)	1972–73	Third Division	2	0	0	0	0	0	2	0
Career Total			6	1	0	0	0	0	6	1
