= Mendo Ristovski =

Australian soccer player

Mendo Ristovski (born 18 February 1956) is an Australian former association football player.

== Playing career ==
=== Club career ===
Ristovski played for Footscray JUST in the National Soccer League.

=== International career ===
He played two matches for Australia.
