= Murray Barnes =

Australian soccer player

Personal information
- Date of birth: 16 January 1954
- Place of birth: Sydney, Australia
- Date of death: 31 December 2011 (aged 57)
- Place of death: Naremburn, Sydney, Australia
- Position: Midfielder

Youth career
- Leeds United
- Kissing Point
- Northern Tigers

Senior career*
Years	Team	Apps	(Gls)
1971–1987	Sydney City	225	(60)

International career^{‡}
1975	Australia U-23		
1975–1981	Australia	32	(6)
- * Club domestic league appearances and goals as of 16 October 2009 ‡ National team caps and goals as of 16 October 2009

Murray Barnes (16 January 1954 – 31 December 2011) was an Australian soccer player. Barnes played for the Australian team for six years, captaining the team nine times.

== Playing career ==
=== Club career ===
Barnes played for a number of junior soccer clubs including Northern Tigers and Kissing Point in New South Wales. He also spent a year with the youth team of English club Leeds United. During his senior club career Barnes played for Sydney Hakoah (later known as Sydney City Soccer Club) in the New South Wales State League and in the National Soccer League.

=== International career ===
He played 32 full international games for the national side scoring six goals. He was captain of the Socceroos for nine matches between 1978 and 1981 including World Cup qualifiers against New Zealand, Fiji, Chinese Taipei and Indonesia.

== Death ==
Barnes died on 31 December 2011, at the age of 57.

== Honours ==
Barnes received the Football Hall of Fame (Australia), Award of Distinction. When Football Federation Australia created the Socceroo Club made up of former national team members in 2008, Barnes was announced as a founding member.

== See also ==
- Football Hall of Fame (Australia)
- Australia national association football team
