= Joe Watson (soccer) =

Scottish-born Australian soccer player

Personal information
- Full name: Joseph Robert Watson
- Date of birth: 1 January 1952
- Place of birth: Scotland
- Date of death: 30 September 2000 (aged 48)
- Position: Winger

Youth career
- 1968–1970: Nottingham Forest

Senior career*
Years	Team	Apps	(Gls)
1970–1973	Dundee United	8	(0)
1973	Forfar Athletic	35	(4)
1973–1986	Hakoah/Sydney City	274	(30)
1988	APIA Leichhardt	12	(1)
1989	Rockdale Ilinden		
1989–1990	Eastern Suburbs		
1991	Waverley		
1992	Cyprus United		

International career
1979–1986	Australia	17	(2)

Managerial career
- 1991: Waverley
- 1992: Cyprus United
- 1993–1994: CYC Stanmore
- 1995: APIA Leichhardt
- 1995: Bankstown City
- 1997: Sydney Cosmos
- 1998: Eastern Suburbs
- 1999: Sydney Cosmos
- 2000: Fairfield Bulls
- * Club domestic league appearances and goals

Joseph Watson (1 January 1952 – 30 September 2000) was an Australian soccer player who played as a winger in a 24-year career extending from 1968 to 1992.

== Playing career ==
A native of Fife, Joe Watson had been playing with Nottingham Forest since the age of 16, but began his professional career at 18 in 1970 with Dundee United, participating in a handful of games before joining Forfar Athletic in 1972. After one season with Forfar, Watson emigrated to Australia in 1973 where, like another Scottish player for United, Kenny Murphy, he spent many seasons playing international football for Australia national football team, primarily Sydney City.

=== Sydney City ===
In Australia he played for Sydney Hakoah. At Sydney City he played four seasons in the New South Wales State League before the club as Sydney City joined the National Soccer League in 1977. Watson played 258 National Soccer League matches, playing with the club until 1986.

=== International career ===
Watson played 17 matches for Australia between 1979 and 1986. While he had retired from international football in 1985, he was honoured with being named captain in a friendly against Czechoslovakia in August 1986. He was replaced after five minutes by Angie Postecoglou.

== Coaching career ==
In 1991 while still playing Watson began coaching at Waverley. In a nine-year coaching career Watson coached at eight separate clubs.

== Illness and death ==
Watson was diagnosed with liver cancer, after which a day of charity matches was scheduled in August 2000 to raise funds. Watson died on 30 September 2000.

== Honours ==
=== Scotland ===
- Forfarshire Cup

Champion: 1971–72

=== Australia ===
- NSW State League

Waratah Cup Champion: 1976

- National Soccer League

Champion: 1977, 1980, 1981, 1982
Runner Up: 1978, 1983, 1985

- OFC Nations Cup

Champion: 1980

=== Individual ===
- NSL Player of the Year: 1983
- FFA Team of the Decade: 1981–1989
- FFA Hall of Fame: 2000
