= Bertie Lutton =

Northern Irish footballer

Personal information
- Full name: Robert John Lutton
- Date of birth: 13 July 1950 (age 76)
- Place of birth: Banbridge, Northern Ireland
- Position: Midfielder

Youth career
- –1967: Banbridge Town

Senior career*
Years	Team	Apps	(Gls)
1967–1971	Wolverhampton Wanderers	21	(1)
1971–1973	Brighton & Hove Albion	29	(4)
1973–1974	West Ham United	12	(1)
- Horsham
1977	Eastern Suburbs (Sydney)		
1978-1981	South Melbourne		
1982	Northcote City		

International career^{‡}
1970–1973	Northern Ireland	6	(0)
- * Club domestic league appearances and goals as of 16:34, 21 February 2012 (UTC) ‡ National team caps and goals as of 16:34, 21 February 2012 (UTC)

Bertie Lutton (born 13 July 1950) is a Northern Irish former footballer who played as a midfielder in England for Wolverhampton Wanderers, Brighton & Hove Albion, West Ham United and Horsham. He played for Eastern Suburbs (Sydney), South Melbourne and Northcote City in Australia and was an international footballer with Northern Ireland from 1970 until 1973.

== Club career ==
Lutton started as a youth team player for his hometown side Banbridge Town before moving to Wolverhampton Wanderers for a £50 fee. He signed for Brighton & Hove Albion in 1971 for £5,000 and in 1973, for a £25,000 fee, for West Ham United making his debut on 10 February 1973 in a 1–0 away win at Norwich City. He played for Northern Ireland whilst at West Ham making him their first player to play for that country. He made only thirteen appearances for West Ham before moving to Horsham. He joined York City on trial making his debut for their reserve side in a 6–0 win over Halifax Town on 3 March 1975. Unable to continue his footballing career because of injuries, he emigrated to Australia where he went on to play for clubs in the National Soccer League and Victorian State League.

== International career ==
Lutton played six times for Northern Ireland making his debut on 18 April 1970 in a 1–0 defeat by Scotland.
