= John Stevenson (soccer) =

Soccer player (born 1953)

Personal information
- Date of birth: 17 June 1953 (age 73)
- Position: Midfielder

Youth career
- Coventry City

Senior career*
Years	Team	Apps	(Gls)
1973–1975	Heart of Midlothian	51	(9)
1975–1976	St Johnstone		
1977–1980	Sydney City	101+	(23+)
1981–1982	South Melbourne	49	(4)
1983–1984	Sunshine George Cross	9+	(0+)

International career
1978	Australia	1	(0)
- * Club domestic league appearances and goals

John Stevenson (born 17 June 1953) is a former soccer player who played as a midfielder in the Scottish and Australian leagues. He played one match for the Australia national soccer team.

== Early life and family ==
Stevenson was raised near Glasgow, Scotland before moving to England as a teenager. His brother Jimmy Stevenson played professional football in Scotland and England. His sister Anne married Gerry Baker. Anne and Gerry's grandson Ryan Strain made his debut for Australia in 2022.

== Club career ==
At the age of 15, Stevenson joined Coventry City. In 1973, he joined Heart of Midlothian. He made 51 league appearances for Hearts before being released on a free transfer in October 1975. He joined St Johnstone on a short-term contract and was released by St Johnstone in early 1976 when he emigrated to Australia. In Australia, he joined Sydney Hakoah (later Sydney City), in the New South Wales State League. He remained at Hakoah once they joined the National Soccer League in 1977, playing over 100 times at the now-Sydney City. In late 1980, he was signed by South Melbourne in a A$17,000 transfer deal. In 1983, Stevenson joined Sunshine George Cross in the Victorian State League. He continued with George Cross the following year where they played in the National Soccer League.

== International career ==
Stevenson played one match for the Australia national soccer team in 1978.
