= Chris Bambridge =

Australian retired football referee

- Full name: Christopher Francis Bambridge
- Born: 7 October 1947 (age 79); Kettering, England

Domestic
Years	League	Role
1977–1991	National Soccer League	Referee

International
Years	League	Role
1980–1991	FIFA listed	Referee

Christopher Francis Bambridge (born 7 October 1947) is an Australian retired football referee. Born in Kettering, England he came to Australia from Britain in 1974.

Bambridge took up refereeing in Kettering. He became a Grade One referee shortly before emigrating to Australia.

Bambridge was appointed to the national league in 1977, where he stayed until his retirement in 1991.

He was awarded the FIFA badge in 1981, gaining selection to the panel of linesmen for the 1981 FIFA World Youth Championship in Australia that year. Following his appointment as linesman for the quarter finals, semi-finals and final of the 1983 FIFA World Youth Championship. Bambridge refereed the final of the 1985 FIFA U-16 World Championship in China.

He was also selected for and officiated at the 1986 FIFA World Cup finals in Mexico and the 1988 Summer Olympic games in South Korea, becoming the only Australian referee to have taken part in both World Cup and Olympic Games finals.

Bambridge is known for having refereed one match in the 1986 FIFA World Cup in Mexico: Spain versus Brazil, in which he famously disallowed a goal for Spain, after a shot from Míchel hit the Brazilian crossbar, fell past the goal line and bounced out of the goal.

After retiring from active refereeing, Bambridge took on the role of Referee Development Manager, administering the development and appointment of referees in metropolitan Melbourne and regional Victoria. He was also president of Soccer Referees Victoria.

Bambridge was admitted into the Australian Soccer Hall of Fame (now the Football Australia Hall of Fame) in 2000, and the Football Victoria Hall of Fame in 2026. A room is named after him at Football Victoria Headquarters.

In 2009, he was a recipient of the Asian Football Confederation Gold Star Award and remains the only Australian referee to receive this honour.

Bambridge continues to work with current referees in assessing and coaching and is a match commissioner with Football Victoria.
