= 1978 Brisbane City FC season =

Brisbane City
1978 season
- Manager: Dennis Ford; Barrie Truman
- Stadium: Perry Park
- National Soccer League: 14th
- NSL Cup: Winners
- Top goalscorer: League: Alan Marley (6); All: Barry Kelso (9)
- Highest home attendance: 5,000 vs. Footscray JUST (12 March 1978); National Soccer League; 5,000 vs. Adelaide City (19 March 1978); National Soccer League
- Lowest home attendance: 1,500 vs. Eastern Suburbs (24 September 1978); NSL Cup
- Average home league attendance: 3,623
- Biggest win: 3–0 vs. Footscray JUST (H) (12 March 1978); National Soccer League; 3–0 vs. Eastern Suburbs (H) (24 September 1978); NSL Cup
- Biggest defeat: 0–4 vs. Canberra City (A) (29 July 1978); National Soccer League

The 1978 season was the second in the National Soccer League for Brisbane City Football Club. In addition to the domestic league, Brisbane City competed in the NSL Cup.

Brisbane City finished 14th in the National Soccer League campaign, although won the NSL Cup in the Final against Adelaide City.

== Players ==
Note: Flags indicate national team as defined under FIFA eligibility rules; some limited exceptions apply. Players may hold more than one non-FIFA nationality.

No.	Pos.	Nation	Player
1	GK	AUS	Kim Wishart
2	DF	SCO	Ian Rathmell (captain)
3	FW	AUS	Brian Kibbey
4	DF	AUS	Peter Tokesi
5	DF	AUS	Steve Perry
6	MF	AUS	Larry Gaffney
7	FW	AUS	Willie Conner
8	MF	ENG	Frank Pimblett
9	MF	NZL	Alan Marley
10	MF	AUS	Roberto Echeverria
11	FW	AUS	Kevin Caldwell
13	FW	AUS	John Coyne

No.	Pos.	Nation	Player
15		AUS	Eusebio Ibanez
20	GK	AUS	Bob Barlow
—	FW	AUS	Mark Brusasco
—		AUS	Steve Clark
—	MF	AUS	Iain Fagan
—	GK	AUS	Savro Iozelli
—	FW	AUS	Ian Johnston
—	FW	AUS	Barry Kelso
—	MF	SCO	John Lavelle
—	DF	AUS	David Ratcliffe
—	FW	AUS	Craig Wallace
—	FW	SCO	George Williamson

== Competitions ==
=== Overall record ===
Competition	First match	Last match	Starting round	Final position	Record							
Competition	First match	Last match	Starting round	Final position	Pld	W	D	L	GF	GA	GD	Win %
National Soccer League	5 March 1978	27 August 1978	Matchday 1	14th	26	7	3	16	29	49	−20	26.92
NSL Cup	14 June 1978	8 October 1978	First round	Winners	5	4	1	0	8	1	+7	80.00
Total					31	11	4	16	37	50	−13	35.48

Source: Competitions

=== National Soccer League ===
==== League table ====
Pos	Team	Pld	W	D	L	GF	GA	GD	Pts
10	Adelaide City	26	9	6	11	38	44	−6	24
11	Newcastle KB United	26	6	10	10	33	40	−7	22
12	Footscray JUST	26	7	8	11	29	37	−8	22
13	Canberra City	26	5	10	11	28	41	−13	20
14	Brisbane City	26	7	3	16	29	49	−20	17

Source: rsssf.com
Rules for classification: 1) Points; 2) Goal difference; 3) Goals scored

==== Results summary ====
Overall								Home						Away					
Pld	W	D	L	GF	GA	GD	Pts	W	D	L	GF	GA	GD	W	D	L	GF	GA	GD
26	7	3	16	29	49	−20	24	4	2	7	15	22	−7	3	1	9	14	27	−13

Source: worldfootball.net

==== Results by round ====
Round	1	2	3	4	5	6	7	8	9	10	11	12	13	14	15	16	17	19	20	21	22	18	23	24	25	26
Ground	A	H	H	A	H	A	A	H	H	A	H	A	H	A	H	A	H	H	H	A	A	A	H	A	H	A
Result	L	W	W	L	L	L	W	L	W	L	W	W	L	D	D	L	L	D	L	L	L	L	L	L	L	W
Position	9	4	3	5	8	11	9	12	9	12	8	7	8	8	9	9	10	12	14	14	14	12	14	14	14	14
Points	0	2	4	4	4	4	6	6	8	8	10	12	12	13	14	14	14	15	15	15	15	15	15	15	15	17

Source: worldfootball.net
A = Away; H = Home; W = Win; D = Draw; L = Loss

==== Matches ====
Win Draw Loss

5 March 1978 1	Fitzroy United	1–0	Brisbane City	Melbourne
	Bozkias 79'	Report		Stadium: Middle Park Soccer Stadium; Attendance: 3,000; Referee: Stewart Mellings

12 March 1978 2	Brisbane City	3–0	Footscray JUST	Brisbane
	Gaffney 32'; Echeverria 49'; Caldwell 55'	Report		Stadium: Perry Park; Attendance: 5,000; Referee: Jack Wood

19 March 1978 3	Brisbane City	2–1	Adelaide City	Brisbane
	Echeverria 48'; Marley 54'	Report	Marocchi 90'	Stadium: Perry Park; Attendance: 5,000; Referee: Dave Nugent

26 March 1978 4	Marconi Fairfield	3–2	Brisbane City	Sydney
	Jankovics 36'; Rooney 44'; Byrne 68' (pen.)	Report	Marley 12', 86'	Stadium: Marconi Oval; Attendance: 6,700; Referee: Tim Davies

2 April 1978 5	Brisbane City	0–3	Eastern Suburbs	Brisbane
		Report	Stevenson 45'; Watson 55'; Tokesi 80' (o.g.)	Stadium: Perry Park; Attendance: 2,400; Referee: John Van Der Lynde

9 April 1978 6	Western Suburbs	3–1	Brisbane City	Sydney
	C. Eaton 37'; Scott 57'; Perry 67' (o.g.)	Report	Conner 17'	Stadium: Englefield Stadium; Attendance: 500; Referee: Richard Lorenc

16 April 1978 7	South Melbourne	0–1	Brisbane City	Melbourne
		Report	Echeverria 80'	Stadium: Middle Park Soccer Stadium; Attendance: 5,750; Referee: Jack Readshaw

23 April 1978 8	Brisbane City	0–1	West Adelaide	Brisbane
		Report	McGachey 44'	Stadium: Perry Park; Attendance: 4,200; Referee: Bob Mee

30 April 1978 9	Brisbane City	1–0	Canberra City	Brisbane
	Caldwell 43'	Report		Stadium: Perry Park; Attendance: 4,100; Referee: Dieter Klose

7 May 1978 10	St George-Budapest	2–0	Brisbane City	Sydney
	Gnavi 46'; Durisic 83'	Report		Stadium: St George Stadium; Attendance: 2,005; Referee: Tony Boskovic

14 May 1978 11	Brisbane City	3–2	Sydney Olympic	Brisbane
	Marley 22', 44'; Conner 61'	Report	D. Allan 72', 80'	Stadium: Perry Park; Attendance: 4,500; Referee: Jack Wood

24 May 1978 12	Newcastle KB United	2–3	Brisbane City	Newcastle
	Boden 8'; Curran 75'	Report	Mason 13' (o.g.); Gaffney 50'; Coyne 82'	Stadium: Newcastle International Sports Centre; Attendance: 6,208; Referee: Brian Fowler

28 May 1978 13	Brisbane City	0–1	Brisbane Lions	Brisbane
		Report	Spearritt 47'	Stadium: Perry Park; Attendance: 4,750; Referee: Jim Reeves

3 June 1978 14	Footscray JUST	2–2	Brisbane City	Melbourne
	Lujic 49'; Rujevic 57'	Report	Rujevic 43' (o.g.); Caldwell 58'	Stadium: Schintler Reserve; Attendance: 1,000; Referee: Dieter Klose

11 June 1978 15	Brisbane City	1–1	Fitzroy United	Brisbane
	Caldwell 37' (pen.)	Report	Campbell 59'	Stadium: Perry Park; Attendance: 3,200; Referee: Dave Nugent

18 June 1978 16	Adelaide City	3–2	Brisbane City	Adelaide
	Deans 32', 41'; Marocchi 40'	Report	B. Nyskohus 66' (o.g.); Lavelle 72'	Stadium: Olympic Sports Field; Attendance: 5,000; Referee: Jack Tarling

25 June 1978 17	Brisbane City	0–3	Marconi Fairfield	Brisbane
		Report	Ollerton 62'; Vieri 74'; Sharne 89'	Stadium: Perry Park; Attendance: 3,550; Referee: Dave Nugent

9 July 1978 19	Brisbane City	0–0	Western Suburbs	Brisbane
		Report		Stadium: Perry Park; Attendance: 2,300; Referee: Dave Nugent

16 July 1978 20	Brisbane City	3–4	South Melbourne	Brisbane
	Marley 22'; Kelso 27'; Perry 90'	Report	Cummings 10'; Christopoulos 37'; Campbell 47'; Evans 71'	Stadium: Perry Park; Attendance: 3,000; Referee: Henry Witschge

23 July 1978 21	West Adelaide	2–0	Brisbane City	Adelaide
	Pillans 63'; Jones 77'	Report		Stadium: Hindmarsh Stadium; Attendance: 4,300; Referee: Don Campbell

29 July 1978 22	Canberra City	4–0	Brisbane City	Canberra
	Byrne 57'; Henderson 69'; Stoddart 84'; Grujicic 84'	Report		Stadium: Bruce Stadium; Attendance: 4,211; Referee: David Yelland

30 July 1978 18	Eastern Suburbs	2–0	Brisbane City	Sydney
	Campbell 54'; Souness 77'	Report		Stadium: Wentworth Park; Attendance: 1,023; Referee: Tim Davies

6 August 1978 23	Brisbane City	1–4	St George-Budapest	Brisbane
	Kelso 60'	Report	Hensman 37'; O'Connor 41', 53'; Morgan 49'	Stadium: Perry Park; Attendance: 2,500; Referee: Jack Wood

13 August 1978 24	Sydney Olympic	2–1	Brisbane City	Sydney
	Ainslie 10'; McIntosh 65'	Report	Kelso 26'	Stadium: Wentworth Park; Attendance: 1,138; Referee: Jim Reeves

20 August 1978 25	Brisbane City	1–2	Newcastle KB United	Brisbane
	Kelso 2'	Report	Boden 40', 87' (pen.)	Stadium: Perry Park; Attendance: 2,600; Referee: Dave Nugent

27 August 1978 26	Brisbane Lions	1–2	Brisbane City	Brisbane
	Hughes 78'	Report	Caldwell 50' (pen.); Kelso 90+2'	Stadium: Perry Park; Attendance: 4,500; Referee: Jack Wood

=== NSL Cup ===
Win Draw Loss

14 June 1978 First round	Brisbane City	1–0	St George-Souths	Brisbane
	Coyne 16'	Report		Stadium: Perry Park; Attendance: Referee: Jack Wood

19 July 1978 Second round	Brisbane City	0–0 (a.e.t.) (5–4 p)	Brisbane Lions	Brisbane
		Report		Stadium: Perry Park; Referee: Dave Nugent

24 September 1978 Quarter-finals	Brisbane City	3–0	Eastern Suburbs	Brisbane
	Caldwell 48' (pen.); Kelso 82', ?'	Report		Stadium: Perry Park; Attendance: 1,500; Referee: Stewart Mellings

1 October 1978 Semi-finals	Brisbane City	2–0 (a.e.t.)	Newcastle KB United	Brisbane
	Caldwell 105' (pen.); Kelso 119'	Report		Stadium: Perry Park; Attendance: 3,000; Referee: Henry Witschge

8 October 1978 Final	Brisbane City	2–1	Adelaide City	Brisbane
	Kelso 28'; Pimblett 77'	Report	Matić 31'	Stadium: Perry Park; Attendance: 4,900; Referee: Tony Boskovic

== Statistics ==
=== Appearances and goals ===
Includes all competitions. Players with no appearances not included in the list.

No.	Pos.	Nat.	Player	National Soccer League		NSL Cup		Total	
No.	Pos.	Nat.	Player	Apps	Goals	Apps	Goals	Apps	Goals
1	GK	(Australia)	Kim Wishart	24	0	4	0	28	0
2	DF	(Scotland)	Ian Rathmell	11+1	0	4	0	16	0
3	FW	(Australia)	Brian Kibbey	18+3	0	4+1	0	26	0
4	DF	(Australia)	Peter Tokesi	23	0	2	0	25	0
5	DF	(Australia)	Steve Perry	25	1	5	0	30	1
6	MF	(Australia)	Larry Gaffney	25+1	2	4	1	30	3
7	FW	(Australia)	Willie Conner	13+4	2	1	0	18	2
8	MF	(England)	Frank Pimblett	17+4	0	4	0	25	0
9	MF	(New Zealand)	Alan Marley	18+2	6	1+1	0	22	6
10	MF	(Australia)	Roberto Echeverria	20+1	3	1+2	0	24	3
11	FW	(Australia)	Kevin Caldwell	20+3	5	5	2	28	7
13	FW	(Australia)	John Coyne	11+7	1	5	1	23	2
15	—	(Australia)	Eusebio Ibanez	2+3	0	0	0	5	0
20	GK	(Australia)	Bob Barlow	2	0	1	0	3	0
—	FW	(Australia)	Mark Brusasco	3	0	0+3	0	6	0
—	—	(Australia)	Steve Clark	1+1	0	0	0	2	0
—	MF	(Australia)	Iain Fagan	8+1	0	0	0	9	0
—	GK	(Australia)	Savro Iozelli	11	0	1	0	12	0
—	FW	(Australia)	Ian Johnston	11+5	0	1+1	0	18	0
—	MF	(Scotland)	John Lavelle	10+1	1	4	0	15	1
—	FW	(Australia)	Barry Kelso	8	5	4+1	4	13	9
—	DF	(Australia)	David Ratcliffe	5	0	4	0	9	0
—	FW	(Australia)	Craig Wallace	0+1	0	0	0	1	0
—	FW	(Scotland)	George Williamson	0+1	0	0	0	1	0

=== Disciplinary record ===
Includes all competitions. The list is sorted by squad number when total cards are equal. Players with no cards not included in the list.

Rank	No.	Pos.	Nat.	Player	National Soccer League			NSL Cup			Total			
Rank	No.	Pos.	Nat.	Player	Yellow card	Second yellow card	Red card	Yellow card	Second yellow card	Red card	Yellow card	Second yellow card	Red card	
1	10	MF	(Australia)	Roberto Echeverria	1	0	1	0	0	1	1	0	2	
2	11	FW	(Australia)	Kevin Caldwell	2	0	1	0	0	0	2	0	1	
3	—	GK	(Scotland)	Savro Iozelli	1	0	1	0	0	0	1	0	1	
4	—	FW	(Australia)	Barry Kelso	0	0	1	0	0	0	0	0	1	
5	—	MF	(Scotland)	John Lavelle	3	0	0	1	0	0	4	0	0	
6	3	FW	(Australia)	Brian Kibbey	3	0	0	0	0	0	3	0	0	
7	4	DF	(Australia)	Peter Tokesi	2	0	0	0	0	0	2	0	0	
7	6	MF	(Australia)	Larry Gaffney	2	0	0	0	0	0	2	0	0	
7	9	MF	(New Zealand)	Alan Marley	2	0	0	0	0	0	2	0	0	
7	13	FW	(Australia)	John Coyne	2	0	0	0	0	0	2	0	0	
11	2	DF	(Scotland)	Ian Rathmell	1	0	0	0	0	0	1	0	0	
11	5	DF	(Australia)	Steve Perry	1	0	0	0	0	0	1	0	0	
11	7	FW	(Australia)	Willie Conner	1	0	0	0	0	0	1	0	0	
11	—	MF	(Australia)	Iain Fagan	1	0	0	0	0	0	1	0	0	
11	—	FW	(Australia)	Ian Johnston	1	0	0	0	0	0	1	0	0	
11	Total					22	0	4	1	0	1	23	0	5

=== Clean sheets ===
Includes all competitions. The list is sorted by squad number when total clean sheets are equal. Numbers in parentheses represent games where both goalkeepers participated and both kept a clean sheet; the number in parentheses is awarded to the goalkeeper who was substituted on, whilst a full clean sheet is awarded to the goalkeeper who was on the field at the start of play. Goalkeepers with no clean sheets not included in the list.

Rank	No.	Nat.	Goalkeeper	NSL	NSL Cup	Total
1	1	(Australia)	Kim Wishart	4	3	7
2	20	(Australia)	Bob Barlow	0	1	1
Total				4	4	8
