= 1979 Brisbane City FC season =

Brisbane City
1979 season
- Head Coach: Nereo Saftich
- Stadium: Perry Park
- National Soccer League: 4th
- NSL Cup: Quarter-finals
- Top goalscorer: League: Kevin Low (11); All: Kevin Low (12)
- Highest home attendance: 6,535 vs. Marconi Fairfield (26 August 1979); National Soccer League
- Lowest home attendance: 1,500 vs. Canberra City (15 April 1979); National Soccer League
- Average home league attendance: 3,274
- Biggest win: 4–0 vs. St George-Budapest (H) (13 May 1979); National Soccer League
- Biggest defeat: 0–4 vs. South Melbourne (A) (16 September 1979); National Soccer League

The 1979 season was the third in the National Soccer League for Brisbane City Football Club. In addition to the domestic league, they also participated in the NSL Cup. Brisbane City finished 4th in their National Soccer League season, and were eliminated in the quarter-finals of the NSL Cup.

== Players ==
Note: Flags indicate national team as defined under FIFA eligibility rules; some limited exceptions apply. Players may hold more than one non-FIFA nationality.

No.	Pos.	Nation	Player
1	GK	AUS	Kim Wishart
2	DF	SCO	Ian Rathmell
4	DF	AUS	Peter Tokesi
5	DF	AUS	Steve Perry
6	MF	AUS	Larry Gaffney
7	FW	NIR	Bobby Campbell
8	MF	ENG	Frank Pimblett
9	MF	AUS	Boze Runje
10	MF	AUS	Roberto Echeverria

No.	Pos.	Nation	Player
11	FW	AUS	Kevin Caldwell
12	FW	AUS	Barry Kelso
13	FW	AUS	Mark Brusasco
15	DF	AUS	David Ratcliffe
16	FW	AUS	John Coyne
17	DF	SCO	Billy Wilkinson
18	DF	SCO	George Potter
19	MF	SCO	Kevin Low
—	FW	AUS	Willie Conner

== Competitions ==
=== Overall record ===
Competition	First match	Last match	Starting round	Final position	Record							
Competition	First match	Last match	Starting round	Final position	Pld	W	D	L	GF	GA	GD	Win %
National Soccer League	11 March 1979	23 September 1979	Matchday 1	4th	26	14	5	7	38	30	+8	53.85
NSL Cup	25 April 1979	27 May 1979	First round	Quarter-finals	3	2	1	0	4	1	+3	66.67
Total					29	16	6	7	42	31	+11	55.17

Source: Competitions

=== National Soccer League ===
==== League table ====
Pos	Team	Pld	W	D	L	GF	GA	GD	Pts	Qualification or relegation
1	Marconi Fairfield (C)	26	15	6	5	58	32	+26	40 (Note: A Bonus Point was awarded for victories of 4 goals or more.)	Qualification to Finals series (Note: The Finals series was not considered the championship for the 1979 National Soccer League.)
2	Heidelberg United	26	14	7	5	44	30	+14	36	Qualification to Finals series
3	Sydney City	26	15	3	8	47	29	+18	34	Qualification to Finals series
4	Brisbane City	26	14	5	7	38	30	+8	34	Qualification to Finals series
5	Adelaide City	26	13	6	7	43	27	+16	33	
6	Newcastle KB United	26	11	9	6	43	30	+13	32	
7	West Adelaide	26	10	4	12	28	31	−3	25	
8	APIA Leichhardt	26	11	3	12	29	37	−8	25	
9	Brisbane Lions	26	8	6	12	28	40	−12	22	
10	Footscray JUST	26	8	3	15	29	43	−14	20	
11	St George-Budapest	26	7	6	13	27	43	−16	20	
12	Canberra City	26	6	8	12	25	41	−16	20	
13	Sydney Olympic (R)	26	7	5	14	23	30	−7	19	Relegated to the 1980 NSW State League
14	South Melbourne	26	6	3	17	26	45	−19	16	

Updated to match(es) played on unknown. Source: rsssf.com
Rules for classification: 1) points; 2) goal difference; 3) number of goals scored.
(C) Champions; (R) Relegated

==== Results summary ====
Overall								Home						Away					
Pld	W	D	L	GF	GA	GD	Pts	W	D	L	GF	GA	GD	W	D	L	GF	GA	GD
26	14	5	7	38	30	+8	47	8	2	3	22	11	+11	6	3	4	16	19	−3

Source: worldfootball.net

==== Results by round ====
Round	1	2	3	4	5	6	7	8	9	10	11	12	13	14	15	16	17	18	19	20	21	22	23	24	25	26
Ground	A	H	A	H	A	H	A	H	A	H	A	H	A	H	H	A	H	H	A	H	A	H	A	H	A	H
Result	W	W	L	W	D	L	W	L	D	W	L	W	L	W	W	W	D	W	D	D	W	L	W	W	L	W
Position	7	7	8	7	6	7	6	9	7	7	9	6	8	8	8	5	5	2	4	4	3	5	4	4	4	4
Points	2	4	4	6	7	7	9	9	10	13	13	15	15	17	19	21	22	24	25	26	28	28	30	32	32	34

Source: worldfootball.net
A = Away; H = Home; W = Win; D = Draw; L = Loss

==== Matches ====
Win Draw Loss

11 March 1979 1	Adelaide City	2–4	Brisbane City	Adelaide
	Deans 8'; Kent 75'	Report	Echeverria 56'; Low 61'; Pimblett 71'; Caldwell 89'	Stadium: Olympic Sports Field; Attendance: 4,236; Referee: Don Campbell

18 March 1979 2	Brisbane City	2–0	APIA Leichhardt	Brisbane
	Echeverria 22'; Caldwell 71' (pen.)	Report		Stadium: Perry Park; Attendance: 3,100; Referee: Jack Wood

25 March 1979 3	Newcastle KB United	4–1	Brisbane City	Newcastle
14:30 AEDT	Curran 15'; Summerscales 37'; Boden 49'; Heys 67'	Report	Low 7'	Stadium: Newcastle International Sports Centre; Attendance: 9,032; Referee: Tim Davies

1 April 1979 4	Brisbane City	2–1	Sydney Olympic	Brisbane
	Low 33', 68'	Report	Eaton 82'	Stadium: Perry Park; Attendance: 2,970; Referee: Des Miles

8 April 1979 5	Heidelberg United	0–0	Brisbane City	Melbourne
		Report		Stadium: Olympic Park; Attendance: 6,000; Referee: Stewart Mellings

15 April 1979 6	Brisbane City	0–1	Canberra City	Brisbane
		Report	Grujicic 80'	Stadium: Perry Park; Attendance: 1,500; Referee: Jim Reeves

22 April 1979 7	Brisbane Lions	1–2	Brisbane City	Brisbane
	Spearritt 85'	Report	Kelso 44', 71'	Stadium: Perry Park; Attendance: 3,500; Referee: Richard Lorenc

29 April 1979 8	Brisbane City	0–1	Sydney City	Brisbane
		Report	Thomson 13'	Stadium: Perry Park; Attendance: 3,100; Referee: Jack Wood

6 May 1979 9	Marconi Fairfield	3–3	Brisbane City	Sydney
	Krncevic 8', 36'; Mariani 30'	Report	Low 25', 78'; Gaffney 77'	Stadium: Marconi Oval; Attendance: 1,575; Referee: Ken Allen

13 May 1979 10	Brisbane City	4–0	St George-Budapest	Brisbane
	Kelso 16'; Coyne 55'; Low 68', 69'	Report		Stadium: Perry Park; Attendance: 2,200; Referee: Des Miles

3 June 1979 11	Footscray JUST	2–0	Brisbane City	Melbourne
	Ilioski 32'; Picioane 34'	Report		Stadium: Olympic Park; Attendance: 1,250; Referee: Tony Beazleigh

10 June 1979 12	Brisbane City	1–0	South Melbourne	Brisbane
	Kelso 72'	Report		Stadium: Perry Park; Attendance: 2,450; Referee: Doug Rennie

17 June 1979 13	West Adelaide	2–1	Brisbane City	Adelaide
	Kosmina 63'; Kambas 82'	Report	Coyne 4'	Stadium: Hindmarsh Stadium; Attendance: 4,600; Referee: Graham Neal

24 June 1979 14	APIA Leichhardt	1–2	Brisbane City	Sydney
	Reed 55'	Report	Coyne 7'; Kelso 35'	Stadium: Wentworth Park; Attendance: 5,023; Referee: Tony Boskovic

1 July 1979 15	Brisbane City	2–1	Adelaide City	Brisbane
	Campbell 67'; Caldwell 73'	Report	Marwe 43'	Stadium: Perry Park; Attendance: 3,100; Referee: Ken Allen

8 July 1979 16	Sydney Olympic	0–1	Brisbane City	Sydney
		Report	Kelso 73'	Stadium: Pratten Park; Attendance: 2,150; Referee: Bill Jones

15 July 1979 17	Brisbane City	1–1	Newcastle KB United	Brisbane
	Caldwell 72'	Report	Curran 80'	Stadium: Perry Park; Attendance: 3,755; Referee: Henry Witschge

22 July 1979 18	Brisbane City	3–1	Heidelberg United	Brisbane
	Low 3'; Perry 18'; Campbell 49'	Report	Taylor 87'	Stadium: Perry Park; Attendance: 3,750; Referee: Jim Reeves

28 July 1979 19	Canberra City	0–0	Brisbane City	Canberra
		Report		Stadium: Bruce Stadium; Attendance: 3,378; Referee: Bob Mee

5 August 1979 20	Brisbane City	0–0	Brisbane Lions	Brisbane
		Report		Stadium: Perry Park; Attendance: 4,445; Referee: Tony Boskovic

15 August 1979 21	Sydney City	0–1	Brisbane City	Sydney
		Report	Low 4'	Stadium: Sydney Sports Ground; Attendance: 745; Referee: Richard Lorenc

26 August 1979 22	Brisbane City	3–4	Marconi Fairfield	Brisbane
	Campbell 55', 65'; Gaffney 89'	Report	Jankovics 5', 62', 81'; Krncevic 17'	Stadium: Perry Park; Attendance: 6,535; Referee: Stewart Mellings

2 September 1979 23	St George-Budapest	0–1	Brisbane City	Sydney
		Report	Brusasco 2'	Stadium: St George Stadium; Attendance: 2,007; Referee: Peter Rampley

9 September 1979 24	Brisbane City	2–1	Footscray JUST	Brisbane
	Campbell 34'; Low 58'	Report	Kondarios 83'	Stadium: Perry Park; Attendance: 2,560; Referee: Bob Mee

16 September 1979 25	South Melbourne	4–0	Brisbane City	Melbourne
	Ristovski 63'; Christopoulos 82'; Evans 85', 89'	Report		Stadium: Middle Park Soccer Stadium; Attendance: 5,000; Referee: Stewart Mellings

23 September 1979 26	Brisbane City	2–0	West Adelaide	Brisbane
	Echeverria 55'; Campbell 89'	Report		Stadium: Perry Park; Attendance: 3,100; Referee: Tim Davies

==== Finals series ====
The Finals series was not considered the championship for the 1979 National Soccer League.

7 October 1979 1	Brisbane City	2–0	Eastern Suburbs	Brisbane
	Campbell 48', 63'	Report		Stadium: Perry Park; Attendance: 3,200; Referee: Jim Reeves

14 October 1979 2	Brisbane City	2–1	Marconi Fairfield	Brisbane
	Campbell 38'; Low 72'	Report	Jankovics 58'	Stadium: Perry Park; Attendance: 5,100; Referee: Chris Bambridge

19 October 1979 3	Heidelberg United	6–2	Brisbane City	Melbourne
	Buljevic 35'; Cole 55', 57', 67'; Bozikas 61', 71'	Report	Kelso 65'; Campbell 70'	Stadium: Olympic Park; Attendance: 500; Referee: Tony Boskovic

28 October 1979 Grand Final 1st leg	Sydney City	1–0	Brisbane City	Sydney
	Silva 78'	Report		Stadium: Wentworth Park; Attendance: 2,523; Referee: Ken Allen

4 November 1979 Grand Final 2nd leg	Brisbane City	1–1 (1–2 agg.)	Sydney City	Brisbane
	Kelso 78'	Report	Trenter 84'	Stadium: Perry Park; Attendance: 4,200; Referee: Don Campbell

=== NSL Cup ===
Win Draw Loss

25 April 1979 First round	Brisbane City	2–0	(Queensland) St George-Souths	Brisbane
	Kelso 48', 82'	Report		Stadium: Perry Park; Attendance: 2,000; Referee: Dave Nugent

20 May 1979 Second round	Brisbane City	1–0	Brisbane Lions	Brisbane
	Low 28'	Report		Stadium: Perry Park; Attendance: 2,500; Referee: Tony Boskovic

27 May 1979 Quarter-finals	Brisbane City	1–1 (a.e.t.) (3–4 p)	St George-Budapest	Brisbane
	Ratcliffe 17'	Report	Hensman 11'	Stadium: Perry Park; Attendance: 2,500; Referee: Chris Bambridge

== Statistics ==
=== Appearances and goals ===
Includes all competitions. Players with no appearances not included in the list.

No.	Pos.	Nat.	Player	National Soccer League		NSL Cup		Total	
No.	Pos.	Nat.	Player	Apps	Goals	Apps	Goals	Apps	Goals
1	GK	(Australia)	Kim Wishart	26	0	3	0	29	0
2	DF	(Scotland)	Ian Rathmell	3+1	0	0	0	4	0
4	DF	(Australia)	Peter Tokesi	8+1	0	0+1	0	10	0
5	DF	(Australia)	Steve Perry	24	1	3	0	27	1
6	MF	(Australia)	Larry Gaffney	19+5	2	3	0	27	2
7	FW	(Northern Ireland)	Bobby Campbell	13+2	6	0	0	15	6
8	MF	(England)	Frank Pimblett	26	1	3	0	29	1
9	MF	(Australia)	Boze Runje	0	0	0+1	0	1	0
10	MF	(Australia)	Roberto Echeverria	11+4	3	2+1	0	18	3
11	FW	(Australia)	Kevin Caldwell	18+3	4	1	0	22	4
12	FW	(Australia)	Barry Kelso	21+4	6	3	2	28	8
13	FW	(Australia)	Mark Brusasco	4+7	1	0+1	0	12	1
15	DF	(Australia)	David Ratcliffe	21+2	0	3	1	26	1
16	FW	(Australia)	John Coyne	19+2	3	3	0	24	3
17	DF	(Scotland)	Billy Wilkinson	23	0	3	0	26	0
18	DF	(England)	George Potter	26	0	3	0	29	0
19	MF	(Scotland)	Kevin Low	24+2	11	3	1	29	12
—	FW	(Australia)	Willie Conner	0+1	0	0	0	1	0

=== Disciplinary record ===
Includes all competitions. The list is sorted by squad number when total cards are equal. Players with no cards not included in the list.

Rank	No.	Pos.	Nat.	Player	National Soccer League			NSL Cup			Total		
Rank	No.	Pos.	Nat.	Player	Yellow card	Second yellow card	Red card	Yellow card	Second yellow card	Red card	Yellow card	Second yellow card	Red card
1	16	FW	(Australia)	John Coyne	0	0	2	0	0	0	0	0	2
2	11	FW	(Australia)	Kevin Caldwell	7	0	1	0	0	0	7	0	1
3	12	FW	(Australia)	Barry Kelso	4	0	0	1	0	0	5	0	0
4	15	DF	(Australia)	David Ratcliffe	4	0	0	0	0	0	4	0	0
4	17	DF	(Scotland)	Billy Wilkinson	4	0	0	0	0	0	4	0	0
6	19	MF	(Scotland)	Kevin Low	3	0	0	0	0	0	3	0	0
7	6	MF	(Australia)	Larry Gaffney	1	0	0	1	0	0	2	0	0
7	7	FW	(Northern Ireland)	Bobby Campbell	2	0	0	0	0	0	2	0	0
7	8	MF	(England)	Frank Pimblett	2	0	0	0	0	0	2	0	0
7	10	MF	(Australia)	Roberto Echeverria	2	0	0	0	0	0	2	0	0
7	18	DF	(England)	George Potter	2	0	0	0	0	0	2	0	0
12	2	DF	(Scotland)	Ian Rathmell	1	0	0	0	0	0	1	0	0
12	5	DF	(Australia)	Steve Perry	1	0	0	0	0	0	1	0	0
Total					33	0	3	2	0	0	35	0	3

=== Clean sheets ===
Includes all competitions. The list is sorted by squad number when total clean sheets are equal. Numbers in parentheses represent games where both goalkeepers participated and both kept a clean sheet; the number in parentheses is awarded to the goalkeeper who was substituted on, whilst a full clean sheet is awarded to the goalkeeper who was on the field at the start of play. Goalkeepers with no clean sheets not included in the list.

Rank	No.	Nat.	Goalkeeper	NSL	NSL Cup	Total
1	1	(Australia)	Kim Wishart	10	2	12
Total				10	2	12
