= 1978 Brisbane Lions SC season =

Brisbane Lions
1978 season
- Head Coach: Brian Daykin; Gyula Vincze
- Stadium: Perry Park
- National Soccer League: 6th
- NSL Cup: Second round
- Top goalscorer: League: Alan Hughes (10); All: Alan Hughes (10)
- Highest home attendance: 4,500 vs. Brisbane City (27 August 1978); National Soccer League
- Lowest home attendance: 330 vs. South Melbourne (26 March 1978); National Soccer League
- Average home league attendance: 2,818
- Biggest win: 7–0 vs. Annerley (H) (24 May 1978); NSL Cup
- Biggest defeat: 0–4 vs. Footscray JUST (A) (20 August 1978); National Soccer League

The 1978 season was the second in the National Soccer League for Brisbane Lions (now Queensland Lions Football Club). In addition to the domestic league, they also participated in the NSL Cup.

== Players ==
Note: Flags indicate national team as defined under FIFA eligibility rules; some limited exceptions apply. Players may hold more than one non-FIFA nationality.

No.	Pos.	Nation	Player
2	DF	SCO	George Potter
3	DF	SCO	Jim Hermiston
4	DF	AUS	Colin Bennett
5	DF	AUS	Alan Niven
6	FW	ENG	John Neale
7	MF	ENG	Eddie Spearrit
8		AUS	Paul Laszlo
10	MF	SCO	Alan Hughes
12	MF	AUS	Steve Amos
13	FW	ENG	Barrie Fairbrother

No.	Pos.	Nation	Player
15	DF	AUS	Leon Wilson
16	MF	ENG	Geoff Morris
—	DF	AUS	Ian Lawrie
—	GK	ENG	Nigel Lowndes
—	GK	NIR	Roddy McKenzie
—	MF	AUS	John Ogden
—	MF	RSA	Paul Ontong
—		AUS	Harry Stewart
—	DF	ENG	Alan Venables
—	MF	AUS	Graham Wilson

== Competitions ==
=== Overall record ===
Competition	First match	Last match	Starting round	Final position	Record							
Competition	First match	Last match	Starting round	Final position	Pld	W	D	L	GF	GA	GD	Win %
National Soccer League	5 March 1978	27 August 1978	Matchday 1	6th	26	8	10	8	37	39	−2	30.77
NSL Cup	24 May 1978	19 July 1978	First round	Second round	2	1	1	0	7	0	+7	50.00
Total					28	9	11	8	44	39	+5	32.14

Source: Competitions

=== National Soccer League ===
==== League table ====
Pos	Team	Pld	W	D	L	GF	GA	GD	Pts	Qualification
4	Marconi Fairfield	26	12	6	8	46	31	+15	30	Qualification to Finals series (Note: The Finals series was not considered the championship for the 1978 National Soccer League.)
5	Fitzroy United	26	9	8	9	39	39	0	26	
6	Brisbane Lions	26	8	10	8	37	39	−2	26	
7	St George-Budapest	26	11	3	12	41	40	+1	25	
8	Sydney Olympic	26	9	7	10	35	43	−8	25	

Source: rsssf.com
Rules for classification: 1) Points; 2) Goal difference; 3) Goals scored

==== Results summary ====
Overall								Home						Away					
Pld	W	D	L	GF	GA	GD	Pts	W	D	L	GF	GA	GD	W	D	L	GF	GA	GD
26	8	10	8	37	39	−2	34	4	6	3	16	15	+1	4	4	5	21	24	−3

Source: worldfootball.net

==== Results by round ====
Round	1	2	4	3	5	6	7	8	9	10	11	13	14	12	15	16	17	18	19	20	21	22	24	23	25	26
Ground	H	A	H	A	A	H	H	A	A	H	A	A	H	H	A	H	A	H	A	A	H	H	H	A	A	H
Result	L	W	D	D	L	D	D	W	D	W	D	W	D	D	L	W	L	W	L	D	L	W	D	W	L	L
Position	14	8	8	8	11	8	10	8	6	4	3	4	5	5	6	5	6	6	6	6	6	6	5	5	6	6
Points	0	2	3	4	4	5	6	8	9	11	12	14	15	16	16	18	18	20	20	21	21	23	24	26	26	26

Source: worldfootball.net
A = Away; H = Home; W = Win; D = Draw; L = Loss

==== Matches ====
Win Draw Loss

5 March 1978 1	Brisbane Lions	0–3	Marconi Fairfield	Brisbane
		Report	Sharne 27'; Jankovics 47', 53'	Stadium: Perry Park; Attendance: 4,000; Referee: Des Miles (Col Amos 46')

12 March 1978 2	Eastern Suburbs	1–3	Brisbane Lions	Sydney
	Campbell 32'	Report	Hughes 59', 68', 74'	Stadium: Wentworth Park; Attendance: 1,010; Referee: Tim Davies

26 March 1978 4	Brisbane Lions	1–1	South Melbourne	Brisbane
	Neale 43'	Report	Wright 74'	Stadium: Perry Park; Attendance: 330; Referee: Dieter Klose

27 March 1978 3	Western Suburbs	2–2	Brisbane Lions	Sydney
	Fisher 18'; Samuels 78'	Report	Morris 5'; Neale 20'	Stadium: Englefield Stadium; Attendance: 1,000; Referee: Barry Wilkinson

2 April 1978 5	West Adelaide	3–0	Brisbane Lions	Adelaide
	Jones 52'; McGregor 61'; Boyle 87'	Report		Stadium: Hindmarsh Stadium; Attendance: 4,786; Referee: Don Campbell

9 April 1978 6	Brisbane Lions	2–2	Canberra City	Brisbane
	Laszlo 13'; Hermiston 40' (pen.)	Report	Cant 9'; Hermiston 15' (o.g.)	Stadium: Perry Park; Attendance: 3,000; Referee: Jack Wood

15 April 1978 7	Brisbane Lions	0–0	St George-Budapest	Brisbane
		Report		Stadium: Perry Park; Attendance: 3,000; Referee: Dave Nugent

23 April 1978 8	Sydney Olympic	2–4	Brisbane Lions	Sydney
	Ainslie 53'; Wilson 80'	Report	Fairbrother 31'; Hughes 34'; Ontong 41'; Laszlo 88'	Stadium: Erskineville Oval; Attendance: 3,685; Referee: Peter Rampley

29 April 1978 9	Newcastle KB United	2–2	Brisbane Lions	Newcastle
	Boden 6'; Mason 78'	Report	Hughes 82'; Spearritt 84'	Stadium: Macquarie Field; Attendance: 5,018; Referee: Barry Wilkinson

7 May 1978 10	Brisbane Lions	3–1	Adelaide City	Brisbane
	Potter 28'; Laszlo 63'; Hermiston 78'	Report	Kolecki 9'	Stadium: Perry Park; Attendance: 3,000; Referee: John Van Der Lynde

14 May 1978 11	Fitzroy United	0–0	Brisbane Lions	Melbourne
		Report		Stadium: Olympic Park; Attendance: 5,500; Referee: Bob Henderson

28 May 1978 13	Brisbane City	0–1	Brisbane Lions	Brisbane
		Report	Spearritt 47'	Stadium: Perry Park; Attendance: 4,750; Referee: Jim Reeves

4 June 1978 14	Brisbane Lions	1–1	Eastern Suburbs	Brisbane
	Thomson 2' (o.g.)	Report	Bennett 47' (o.g.)	Stadium: Perry Park; Attendance: 3,000; Referee: Bob Mee

5 June 1978 12	Brisbane Lions	0–0	Footscray JUST	Brisbane
		Report		Stadium: Perry Park; Attendance: 2,500; Referee: Dieter Klose

11 June 1978 15	Marconi Fairfield	3–1	Brisbane Lions	Sydney
	Wilson 15' (o.g.); Neale 81' (o.g.); Vieri 87' (pen.)	Report	Morris 59'	Stadium: Marconi Oval; Attendance: 3,461; Referee: Tim Davies

18 June 1978 16	Brisbane Lions	3–1	Western Suburbs	Brisbane
	Hughes 69'; Amos 74'; Fairbrother 77'	Report	Fisher 89'	Stadium: Perry Park; Attendance: 2,300; Referee: Jack Wood

25 June 1978 17	South Melbourne	2–1	Brisbane Lions	Melbourne
	Christopoulos 30'; Campbell 40'	Report	Fairbrother ?'	Stadium: Middle Park Soccer Stadium; Attendance: 5,000

2 July 1978 18	Brisbane Lions	1–0	West Adelaide	Brisbane
	Neale 73'	Report		Stadium: Perry Park; Attendance: 3,300; Referee: Peter Rampley

8 July 1978 19	Canberra City	2–1	Brisbane Lions	Canberra
	Bennett 42' (o.g.); Byrne 82'	Report	Neale 6'	Stadium: Bruce Stadium; Attendance: 3,520; Referee: Richard Lorenc

16 July 1978 20	St George-Budapest	2–2	Brisbane Lions	Sydney
	Morgan 7'; Grosse 85'	Report	Hughes 18', 63'	Stadium: St George Stadium; Attendance: 4,953; Referee: Bill Jones

23 July 1978 21	Brisbane Lions	1–2	Sydney Olympic	Brisbane
	Morris 31'	Report	McIntosh 39'; Bell 89'	Stadium: Perry Park; Attendance: 2,100; Referee: Dave Nugent

30 July 1978 22	Brisbane Lions	2–1	Newcastle KB United	Brisbane
	Fairbrother 16'; Hermiston 18'	Report	Boden 90'	Stadium: Perry Park; Attendance: 3,500; Referee: Jack Wood

13 August 1978 24	Brisbane Lions	1–1	Fitzroy United	Brisbane
	Amos 57'	Report	Campbell 22'	Stadium: Perry Park; Attendance: 2,100; Referee: Jack Wood

19 August 1978 23	Adelaide City	1–4	Brisbane Lions	Adelaide
	Muniz 76' (pen.)	Report	Laszlo 22'; B. Nyskohus 58' (o.g.); Hughes 62'; Ontong 88'	Stadium: Olympic Sports Field; Attendance: 1,500; Referee: Dennis Stanley

20 August 1978 25	Footscray JUST	4–0	Brisbane Lions	Melbourne
	Ilioski 8'; Lujic 26'; Picioane 43'; Nicolaides 75'	Report		Stadium: Middle Park Soccer Stadium; Attendance: 12,000; Referee: David Yelland

27 August 1978 26	Brisbane Lions	1–2	Brisbane City	Brisbane
	Hughes 78'	Report	Caldwell 50' (pen.); Kelso 90+2'	Stadium: Perry Park; Attendance: 4,500; Referee: Jack Wood

=== NSL Cup ===
Win Draw Loss

24 May 1978 First round	Brisbane Lions	7–0	Annerley	Brisbane
	Laszlo ?', ?'; Spearritt ?'; Fairbrother ?'; Morris ?'; Amos ?'; Ontong ?'	Report		Stadium: Perry Park; Attendance:

19 July 1978 Second round	Brisbane City	0–0 (a.e.t.) (5–4 p)	Brisbane Lions	Brisbane
		Report		Stadium: Perry Park; Referee: Dave Nugent

== Statistics ==
=== Appearances and goals ===
Includes all competitions. Players with no appearances not included in the list.

No.	Pos.	Nat.	Player	National Soccer League		NSL Cup		Total	
No.	Pos.	Nat.	Player	Apps	Goals	Apps	Goals	Apps	Goals
2	DF	(Scotland)	George Potter	26	1	2	0	28	1
3	DF	(Scotland)	Jim Hermiston	26	3	2	0	28	3
4	DF	(Australia)	Colin Bennett	23	0	2	0	25	0
5	DF	(Australia)	Alan Niven	19	0	1	0	20	0
6	FW	(England)	John Neale	25+1	4	0	0	26	4
7	MF	(England)	Eddie Spearritt	15+1	2	2	1	18	3
8	—	(Australia)	Paul Laszlo	21+2	4	1+1	2	25	6
10	MF	(Scotland)	Alan Hughes	25+1	10	2	0	28	10
12	MF	(Australia)	Steve Amos	16+5	2	1+1	1	23	3
13	FW	(England)	Barrie Fairbrother	15+3	4	1	1	19	5
15	DF	(Australia)	Leon Wilson	13+1	0	2	0	16	0
16	MF	(England)	Geoff Morris	15+1	3	2	1	18	4
—	DF	(Australia)	Ian Lawrie	1+4	0	0	0	5	0
—	GK	(England)	Nigel Lowndes	22	0	2	0	24	0
—	GK	(Northern Ireland)	Roddy McKenzie	4	0	0	0	4	0
—	MF	(England)	Geoff Morris	15+1	3	0	0	16	3
—	FW	(England)	John Neale	25+1	4	2	0	28	4
—	MF	(Australia)	John Ogden	3+3	0	0+1	0	7	0
—	MF	(South Africa)	Paul Ontong	12+4	2	0+1	1	17	3
—	—	(Australia)	Harry Stewart	0+1	0	0	0	1	0
—	DF	(England)	Alan Venables	4+1	0	0	0	5	0
—	MF	(Australia)	Graham Wilson	1+3	0	0	0	4	0

=== Disciplinary record ===
Includes all competitions. The list is sorted by squad number when total cards are equal. Players with no cards not included in the list.

Rank	No.	Pos.	Nat.	Player	National Soccer League			NSL Cup			Total		
Rank	No.	Pos.	Nat.	Player	Yellow card	Second yellow card	Red card	Yellow card	Second yellow card	Red card	Yellow card	Second yellow card	Red card
1	7	MF	(England)	Eddie Spearritt	3	0	0	0	0	0	3	0	0
1	10	MF	(Scotland)	Alan Hughes	3	0	0	0	0	0	3	0	0
3	8	—	(Australia)	Paul Laszlo	2	0	0	0	0	0	2	0	0
4	12	MF	(Australia)	Steve Amos	1	0	0	0	0	0	1	0	0
4	16	MF	(England)	Geoff Morris	1	0	0	0	0	0	1	0	0
4	—	GK	(England)	Nigel Lowndes	1	0	0	0	0	0	1	0	0
4	—	MF	(Australia)	John Neale	1	0	0	0	0	0	1	0	0
4	—	DF	(England)	Alan Venables	1	0	0	0	0	0	1	0	0
Total					13	0	0	0	0	0	13	0	0

=== Clean sheets ===
Includes all competitions. The list is sorted by squad number when total clean sheets are equal. Numbers in parentheses represent games where both goalkeepers participated and both kept a clean sheet; the number in parentheses is awarded to the goalkeeper who was substituted on, whilst a full clean sheet is awarded to the goalkeeper who was on the field at the start of play. Goalkeepers with no clean sheets not included in the list.

Rank	No.	Nat.	Goalkeeper	NSL	NSL Cup	Total
1	—	(England)	Nigel Lowndes	5	2	7
Total				5	2	7
