= 1980 Brisbane City FC season =

Brisbane City
1980 season
- Head Coach: Nereo Saftich; Steve Perry; George Potter; Gyula Vincze
- Stadium: Perry Park
- National Soccer League: 12th
- NSL Cup: First round
- Top goalscorer: League: Barry Kelso (9); All: Barry Kelso (9)
- Highest home attendance: 3,372 vs. Brisbane Lions (29 June 1980); National Soccer League
- Lowest home attendance: 1,000 vs. Mount Gravatt (25 April 1980); NSL Cup
- Average home league attendance: 2,451
- Biggest win: 7–0 vs. Heidelberg United (H) (27 July 1980); National Soccer League
- Biggest defeat: 0–4 vs. Marconi Fairfield (A) (30 March 1980); National Soccer League

The 1980 season was the fourth in the National Soccer League for Brisbane City Football Club. In addition to the domestic league, they also participated in the NSL Cup. Brisbane City finished 12th in their National Soccer League season, and were eliminated in the first round of the NSL Cup.

== Players ==
Note: Flags indicate national team as defined under FIFA eligibility rules; some limited exceptions apply. Players may hold more than one non-FIFA nationality.

No.	Pos.	Nation	Player
1	GK	AUS	Kim Wishart
2	DF	SCO	George Potter
3	DF	AUS	David Ratcliffe
4	DF	AUS	Peter Tokesi
5	DF	AUS	Steve Perry
6	MF	AUS	Larry Gaffney
7	FW	HUN	Joe Palinkas
8	MF	ENG	Frank Pimblett
9	DF	AUS	Michael Tripp
10	MF	SCO	Kevin Low
11	FW	AUS	Kevin Caldwell

No.	Pos.	Nation	Player
12	FW	AUS	Barry Kelso
13	FW	AUS	Mark Brusasco
14	MF	SCO	Bobby Hamilton
15		AUS	Jim McCluskey
16	FW	AUS	Willie Conner
17	DF	SCO	Billy Wilkinson
18	FW	AUS	Dominic Confessore
20	GK	AUS	Martin Coe
—	FW	AUS	John Coyne
—	MF	AUS	Boze Runje
—	MF	AUS	David Vincenzino

== Competitions ==
=== Overall record ===
Competition	First match	Last match	Starting round	Final position	Record							
Competition	First match	Last match	Starting round	Final position	Pld	W	D	L	GF	GA	GD	Win %
National Soccer League	9 March 1980	28 September 1980	Matchday 1	12th	26	4	10	12	29	36	−7	15.38
NSL Cup	25 April 1980		First round	First round	1	0	0	1	0	1	−1	0.00
Total					27	4	10	13	29	37	−8	14.81

Source: Competitions

=== National Soccer League ===
==== League table ====
Pos	Team	Pld	W	D	L	GF	GA	GD	Pts	Qualification or relegation
1	Sydney City (C)	26	16	5	5	51	26	+25	37	Qualification to Finals series (Note: The Finals series was not considered the championship for the 1980 National Soccer League.)
2	Heidelberg United	26	15	6	5	55	33	+22	36	Qualification to Finals series
3	South Melbourne	26	15	5	6	42	21	+21	35	Qualification to Finals series
4	Marconi Fairfield	26	14	6	6	53	32	+21	34	Qualification to Finals series
5	Adelaide City	26	13	4	9	40	27	+13	30	
6	Newcastle KB United	26	12	6	8	32	31	+1	30	
7	Brisbane Lions	26	7	11	8	28	32	−4	25	
8	APIA Leichhardt	26	8	7	11	27	35	−8	23	
9	Footscray JUST	26	7	9	10	32	41	−9	23	
10	Canberra City	26	7	7	12	34	33	+1	21	
11	Blacktown City	26	9	3	14	34	55	−21	21	
12	Brisbane City	26	4	10	12	29	36	−7	18	
13	West Adelaide	26	7	3	16	24	46	−22	17	
14	St George-Budapest (R)	26	5	4	17	32	65	−33	14	Relegated to the 1981 NSW State League

Updated to match(es) played on unknown. Source: rsssf.com
Rules for classification: 1) points; 2) goal difference; 3) number of goals scored.
(C) Champions; (R) Relegated

==== Results summary ====
Overall								Home						Away					
Pld	W	D	L	GF	GA	GD	Pts	W	D	L	GF	GA	GD	W	D	L	GF	GA	GD
26	4	10	12	29	36	−7	22	4	4	5	18	13	+5	0	6	7	11	23	−12

Source: worldfootball.net

==== Results by round ====
Round	1	2	3	4	5	6	7	8	9	10	11	13	14	15	16	12	17	18	19	20	21	22	23	24	25	26
Ground	H	A	H	A	H	A	H	A	H	A	H	A	H	A	H	H	A	A	H	A	H	A	H	A	A	H
Result	D	D	L	L	L	L	L	L	W	L	W	D	L	D	W	D	D	D	W	D	D	L	L	L	L	D
Position	5	7	12	14	14	14	14	14	13	14	13	13	13	12	12	13	11	10	10	10	10	11	12	12	12	12
Points	1	2	2	2	2	2	2	2	4	4	6	7	7	8	10	11	12	13	15	16	17	17	17	17	17	18

Source: worldfootball.net
A = Away; H = Home; W = Win; D = Draw; L = Loss

==== Matches ====
Win Draw Loss

9 March 1980 1	Brisbane City	1–1	Footscray JUST	Brisbane
	Caldwell 79' (pen.)	Report	Caldwell 11' (o.g.)	Stadium: Perry Park; Attendance: 3,150; Referee: Peter Rampley

16 March 1980 2	Adelaide City	0–0	Brisbane City	Adelaide
		Report		Stadium: Olympic Sports Field; Attendance: 3,100; Referee: Don Campbell

23 March 1980 3	Brisbane City	0–1	St George-Budapest	Brisbane
		Report	Beggs 11'	Stadium: Perry Park; Attendance: 2,050; Referee: Bob Mee

30 March 1980 4	Marconi Fairfield	4–0	Brisbane City	Sydney
	Sharne 48', 68'; Krncevic 59'; Jankovics 65'	Report		Stadium: Marconi Oval; Attendance: 4,725; Referee: Tony Boskovic

6 April 1980 5	Brisbane City	1–2	Newcastle KB United	Brisbane
	Kelso 16'	Report	Senkalski 80'; Kamasz 83'	Stadium: Perry Park; Attendance: 1,900; Referee: Tim Davies

13 April 1980 6	Heidelberg United	3–1	Brisbane City	Melbourne
	Cole 5', 44', 75'	Report	Kelso 42'	Stadium: Olympic Park; Attendance: 3,200; Referee: Tony Beazleigh

20 April 1980 7	Brisbane City	0–1	South Melbourne	Brisbane
		Report	Cummings 72'	Stadium: Perry Park; Attendance: 2,634; Referee: Richard Lorenc

27 April 1980 8	West Adelaide	1–0	Brisbane City	Adelaide
14:30 ACST	Norris 54'	Report		Stadium: Hindmarsh Stadium; Attendance: 2,900; Referee: Bobby Kerr

4 May 1980 9	Brisbane City	1–0	Sydney City	Brisbane
	Brusasco 58' (pen.)	Report		Stadium: Perry Park; Attendance: 2,536; Referee: Stewart Mellings

11 May 1980 10	Blacktown City	3–1	Brisbane City	Sydney
	Wilkinson 4'; Hormazabal 36'; O'Donnell 56'	Report	Palinkas 74'	Stadium: Gabbie Stadium; Attendance: 2,972; Referee: Peter Rampley

18 May 1980 11	Brisbane City	1–0	APIA Leichhardt	Brisbane
	Gaffney 70'	Report		Stadium: Perry Park; Attendance: 2,215; Referee: Chris Bambridge

1 June 1980 13	Canberra City	1–1	Brisbane City	Canberra
	O'Shea 72'	Report	Kelso 73'	Stadium: Bruce Stadium; Attendance: 3,580; Referee: Chris Bambridge

8 June 1980 14	Brisbane City	1–2	Adelaide City	Brisbane
	Hamilton 44'	Report	Barnes 50'; Fashanu 65'	Stadium: Perry Park; Attendance: 1,380; Referee: Jim Reeves

14 June 1980 15	Footscray JUST	1–1	Brisbane City	Melbourne
	Ilioski 3'	Report	McCluskey 52'	Stadium: Middle Park Soccer Stadium; Attendance: 1,000; Referee: Evan Venios

22 June 1980 16	Brisbane City	2–1	Marconi Fairfield	Brisbane
	Potter 53' (pen.); McCluskey 77'	Report	Jankovics 11'	Stadium: Perry Park; Attendance: 2,337; Referee: Tony Beazleigh

29 June 1980 12	Brisbane City	1–1	Brisbane Lions	Brisbane
	Kelso 67'	Report	Ontong 86'	Stadium: Perry Park; Attendance: 3,372; Referee: Tony Boskovic

13 July 1980 17	St George-Budapest	1–1	Brisbane City	Sydney
15:00 AEST	Katholos 79'	Report	Ratcliffe 22'	Stadium: St George Stadium; Attendance: 2,107; Referee: Richard Lorenc

19 July 1980 18	Newcastle KB United	1–1	Brisbane City	Newcastle
	Heys 14'	Report	Hamilton 32'	Stadium: Newcastle International Sports Centre; Attendance: 5,190; Referee: Doug Rennie

27 July 1980 19	Brisbane City	7–0	Heidelberg United	Brisbane
	Kelso 19', 50', 84'; Low 42'; Palinkas 70'; Ratcliffe 80'; Brusasco 83'	Report		Stadium: Perry Park; Attendance: 2,547; Referee: Peter Rampley

10 August 1980 20	South Melbourne	3–3	Brisbane City	Melbourne
	Rogers 22'; Bannon 78'; Evans 90'	Report	Conner 57', 80'; Kelso 83'	Stadium: Middle Park Soccer Stadium; Attendance: 4,800; Referee: Evans Venios

17 August 1980 21	Brisbane City	1–1	West Adelaide	Brisbane
	Ratcliffe 86'	Report	Manecas 71'	Stadium: Perry Park; Attendance: 2,563; Referee: Henry Witschge

31 August 1980 22	Sydney City	2–1	Brisbane City	Sydney
15:00 AEST	Watson 3'; Gomez 8'	Report	Palinkas 5'	Stadium: ES Marks Athletics Field; Attendance: 1,502; Referee: Ken Allen

7 September 1980 23	Brisbane City	1–2	Blacktown City	Brisbane
	Ratcliffe 48'	Report	Wilkinson 14', 85'	Stadium: Perry Park; Attendance: 2,312; Referee: Bob Mee

14 September 1980 24	APIA Leichhardt	2–1	Brisbane City	Sydney
	Pirie 67', 77'	Report	Kelso 42'	Stadium: Lambert Park; Attendance: 2,103; Referee: Jim Reeves

21 September 1980 25	Brisbane Lions	1–0	Brisbane City	Brisbane
	Verweij 49'	Report		Stadium: Lions Stadium; Attendance: 2,500; Referee: Henry Witschge

28 September 1980 26	Brisbane City	1–1	Canberra City	Brisbane
	Gaffney 10'	Report	Maclaren 72'	Stadium: Perry Park; Attendance: 2,863; Referee: Tony Boskovic

=== NSL Cup ===
Win Draw Loss

25 April 1980 First round	Brisbane City	0–1	(Queensland) Mount Gravatt	Brisbane
		Report	Bland 81'	Stadium: Perry Park; Attendance: 1,000; Referee: Dave Nugent

== Statistics ==
=== Appearances and goals ===
Includes all competitions. Players with no appearances not included in the list.

No.	Pos.	Nat.	Player	National Soccer League		NSL Cup		Total	
No.	Pos.	Nat.	Player	Apps	Goals	Apps	Goals	Apps	Goals
1	GK	(Australia)	Kim Wishart	17	0	0	0	17	0
2	DF	(England)	George Potter	24+1	0	1	0	26	0
3	DF	(Australia)	David Ratcliffe	25	4	1	0	26	4
5	DF	(Australia)	Steve Perry	25+1	0	1	0	27	0
6	MF	(Australia)	Larry Gaffney	17+1	2	1	0	19	2
7	FW	(Hungary)	Joe Palinkas	17+4	3	1	0	22	3
8	MF	(England)	Frank Pimblett	17	0	0	0	17	0
9	DF	(Australia)	Michael Tripp	2+3	0	1	0	6	0
10	MF	(Scotland)	Kevin Low	16+4	1	0+1	0	21	1
11	FW	(Australia)	Kevin Caldwell	15+7	1	0+1	0	23	1
12	FW	(Australia)	Barry Kelso	24+1	9	1	0	26	9
13	FW	(Australia)	Mark Brusasco	6+9	2	0	0	15	2
14	MF	(Scotland)	Bobby Hamilton	18	2	0	0	18	2
15	—	(Australia)	Jim McCluskey	6	2	0	0	6	2
16	FW	(Australia)	Willie Conner	11	2	0	0	11	2
17	DF	(Scotland)	Billy Wilkinson	26	0	1	0	27	0
18	FW	(Australia)	Dominic Confessore	2+2	0	1	0	5	0
20	GK	(Australia)	Martin Coe	9+2	0	1	0	12	0
—	FW	(Australia)	John Coyne	7	0	1	0	8	0
—	MF	(Australia)	Boze Runje	1	0	0	0	1	0
—	MF	(Australia)	David Vincenzino	1+2	0	0	0	3	0

=== Disciplinary record ===
Includes all competitions. The list is sorted by squad number when total cards are equal. Players with no cards not included in the list.

Rank	No.	Pos.	Nat.	Player	National Soccer League			NSL Cup			Total		
Rank	No.	Pos.	Nat.	Player	Yellow card	Second yellow card	Red card	Yellow card	Second yellow card	Red card	Yellow card	Second yellow card	Red card
1	10	MF	(Australia)	Kevin Low	2	0	1	0	0	0	2	0	1
2	6	MF	(Australia)	Larry Gaffney	0	0	1	0	0	0	0	0	1
3	11	FW	(Australia)	Kevin Caldwell	4	0	0	0	0	0	4	0	0
4	3	DF	(Australia)	David Ratcliffe	3	0	0	0	0	0	3	0	0
4	12	FW	(Australia)	Barry Kelso	3	0	0	0	0	0	3	0	0
4	14	MF	(Scotland)	Bobby Hamilton	3	0	0	0	0	0	3	0	0
7	7	MF	(Hungary)	Joe Palinkas	2	0	0	0	0	0	2	0	0
7	13	FW	(Australia)	Mark Brusasco	2	0	0	0	0	0	2	0	0
9	2	DF	(England)	George Potter	1	0	0	0	0	0	1	0	0
9	8	MF	(England)	Frank Pimblett	1	0	0	0	0	0	1	0	0
9	17	DF	(Scotland)	Billy Wilkinson	1	0	0	0	0	0	1	0	0
Total					22	0	2	0	0	0	22	0	2

=== Clean sheets ===
Includes all competitions. The list is sorted by squad number when total clean sheets are equal. Numbers in parentheses represent games where both goalkeepers participated and both kept a clean sheet; the number in parentheses is awarded to the goalkeeper who was substituted on, whilst a full clean sheet is awarded to the goalkeeper who was on the field at the start of play. Goalkeepers with no clean sheets not included in the list.

Rank	No.	Nat.	Goalkeeper	NSL	NSL Cup	Total
1	1	(Australia)	Kim Wishart	3	0	3
2	20	(Australia)	Martin Coe	1	0	1
Total				4	0	4
