= 1981 Brisbane City FC season =

Brisbane City
1981 season
- Head Coach: George Potter
- Stadium: Perry Park
- National Soccer League: 3rd
- NSL Cup: Quarter-finals
- Top goalscorer: League: Paul Wilkinson (12); All: Paul Wilkinson (14)
- Highest home attendance: 5,000 vs. Brisbane Lions (19 July 1981); National Soccer League; 5,000 vs. Newcastle KB United (2 August 1981); National Soccer League
- Lowest home attendance: 1,000 vs. Mareeba United (8 June 1981); NSL Cup
- Average home league attendance: 2,660
- Biggest win: 4–0 vs. Marconi Fairfield (21 June 1981); National Soccer League
- Biggest defeat: 0–3 vs. Canberra City (14 June 1981); National Soccer League

The 1981 season was the fifth in the National Soccer League for Brisbane City Football Club. In addition to the domestic league, they also participated in the NSL Cup. Brisbane City finished 3rd in their National Soccer League season, and were eliminated in the quarter-finals of the NSL Cup.

== Players ==
Note: Flags indicate national team as defined under FIFA eligibility rules; some limited exceptions apply. Players may hold more than one non-FIFA nationality.

No.	Pos.	Nation	Player
1	GK	AUS	Kim Wishart
2	DF	IRL	Jimmy Dunne
3	DF	AUS	David Ratcliffe
4	DF	AUS	Peter Tokesi
5	DF	AUS	Steve Perry
6	MF	AUS	Larry Gaffney
7	FW	HUN	Joe Palinkas
8	MF	ENG	Frank Pimblett
9	FW	AUS	Willie Conner
10	MF	SCO	Kevin Low
11	FW	AUS	Kevin Caldwell
12	FW	AUS	Barry Kelso

No.	Pos.	Nation	Player
13	FW	AUS	Mark Brusasco
14	MF	SCO	Bobby Hamilton
15	FW	ENG	Paul Wilkinson
16	MF	SCO	John McVeigh
17	DF	SCO	Billy Wilkinson
18	MF	AUS	David Vincenzino
19	DF	AUS	Michael Tripp
20	GK	AUS	Martin Coe
22	DF	SCO	George Potter
—	FW	AUS	Dominic Confessore
—	MF	AUS	Angelo Falco

== Competitions ==
=== Overall record ===
Competition	First match	Last match	Starting round	Final position	Record							
Competition	First match	Last match	Starting round	Final position	Pld	W	D	L	GF	GA	GD	Win %
National Soccer League	15 February 1981	13 September 1981	Matchday 1	3rd	30	12	11	7	37	25	+12	40.00
NSL Cup	8 February 1981	17 June 1981	First round	Quarter-finals	3	2	0	1	6	4	+2	66.67
Total					33	14	11	8	43	29	+14	42.42

Source: Competitions

=== National Soccer League ===
==== League table ====
Pos	Team	Pld	W	D	L	GF	GA	GD	Pts	Relegation
1	Sydney City (C)	30	19	5	6	59	30	+29	43	
2	South Melbourne	30	13	13	4	41	27	+14	39	
3	Brisbane City	30	12	11	7	37	25	+12	35	
4	APIA Leichhardt	30	12	11	7	39	33	+6	35	
5	Canberra City	30	13	7	10	41	32	+9	33	
6	Brisbane Lions	30	11	11	8	41	33	+8	33	
7	Adelaide City	30	13	6	11	46	42	+4	32	
8	Heidelberg United	30	12	7	11	48	40	+8	31	
9	Sydney Olympic	30	11	9	10	46	46	0	31	
10	Newcastle KB United	30	11	8	11	41	41	0	30	
11	Wollongong City	30	8	12	10	35	39	−4	28	
12	Preston Makedonia	30	9	7	14	39	41	−2	25	
13	Footscray JUST	30	9	7	14	32	48	−16	25	
14	Marconi Fairfield	30	9	7	14	23	45	−22	25	
15	Blacktown City (R)	30	6	9	15	32	47	−15	21	Relegated to the 1982 NSW State League
16	West Adelaide	30	5	4	21	26	57	−31	14	

Updated to match(es) played on unknown. Source: rsssf.com
Rules for classification: 1) points; 2) goal difference; 3) number of goals scored.
(C) Champions; (R) Relegated

==== Results summary ====
Overall								Home						Away					
Pld	W	D	L	GF	GA	GD	Pts	W	D	L	GF	GA	GD	W	D	L	GF	GA	GD
30	12	11	7	37	25	+12	47	9	4	2	24	9	+15	3	7	5	13	16	−3

Source: worldfootball.net

==== Results by round ====
Round	1	2	3	4	5	6	7	8	9	10	11	12	26	14	15	16	17	18	19	20	21	22	23	24	25	13	27	28	29	30
Ground	H	A	H	A	H	A	H	A	H	A	H	A	H	A	A	H	A	H	A	H	A	H	A	H	A	H	A	H	H	A
Result	W	D	D	D	W	L	W	L	W	W	D	D	W	D	L	W	L	W	D	L	L	W	W	D	D	D	W	L	W	D
Position	3	3	5	5	5	7	5	7	5	3	4	5	5	4	6	6	6	6	6	7	8	7	6	6	6	4	3	4	4	3
Points	2	3	4	5	7	7	9	9	11	13	14	15	17	18	18	20	20	22	23	23	23	25	27	28	29	30	32	32	34	35

Source: worldfootball.net
A = Away; H = Home; W = Win; D = Draw; L = Loss

==== Matches ====
Win Draw Loss

15 February 1981 1	Brisbane City	2–1	West Adelaide	Brisbane
	P. Wilkinson 17'; Palinkas 39' (pen.)	Report	Perry 41' (o.g.)	Stadium: Spencer Park; Attendance: 1,500; Referee: Dave Nugent

22 February 1981 2	Sydney City	1–1	Brisbane City	Sydney
	Boden 37' (pen.)	Report	Caldwell 74' (pen.)	Stadium: Sydney Sports Ground; Attendance: 1,500; Referee: Doug Rennie

1 March 1981 3	Brisbane City	0–0	Canberra City	Brisbane
		Report		Stadium: Spencer Park; Attendance: 2,000; Referee: Gary Power

8 March 1981 4	Marconi Fairfield	1–1	Brisbane City	Sydney
	Byrne 68'	Report	McVeigh 25'	Stadium: Marconi Oval; Attendance: 3,420; Referee: Tony Boskovic

15 March 1981 5	Brisbane City	3–0	Sydney Olympic	Brisbane
	P. Wilkinson 27'; Palinkas 67'; Hamilton 76'	Report		Stadium: Spencer Park; Attendance: 2,500; Referee: Dave Nugent

29 March 1981 6	Heidelberg United	2–0	Brisbane City	Melbourne
	Bozikas 4'; Yankos 59'	Report		Stadium: Olympic Park No. 2 Attendance: 3,500; Referee: Stewart Mellings

5 April 1981 7	Brisbane City	2–0	Footscray JUST	Brisbane
	P. Wilkinson 71'; Conner 80'	Report		Stadium: Spencer Park; Attendance: 1,600; Referee: Jack Wood

12 April 1981 8	Brisbane Lions	1–0	Brisbane City	Brisbane
	Millman 26'	Report		Stadium: Richlands Stadium; Attendance: 3,500; Referee: Ken Allen

18 April 1981 9	Brisbane City	2–1	Blacktown City	Brisbane
	Hamilton 43', 87'	Report	Culina 85'	Stadium: Spencer Park; Attendance: 2,000; Referee: Des Miles

26 April 1981 10	Newcastle KB United	0–2	Brisbane City	Newcastle
		Report	Ratcliffe 46'; Kelso 54'	Stadium: Newcastle International Sports Centre; Attendance: 4,569; Referee: Tony Boskovic

3 May 1981 11	Brisbane City	0–0	APIA Leichhardt	Brisbane
		Report		Stadium: Spencer Park; Attendance: 2,500; Referee: Jack Wood

10 May 1981 12	Wollongong City	0–0	Brisbane City	Wollongong
		Report		Stadium: Wollongong Showground; Attendance: 5,309; Referee: Tim Davies

17 May 1981 26	Brisbane City	1–0	Wollongong City	Brisbane
	P. Wilkinson 17'	Report		Stadium: Spencer Park; Attendance: 4,800; Referee: Dave Nugent

24 May 1981 14	Preston Makedonia	1–1	Brisbane City	Melbourne
	Cullen 50'	Report	Hamilton 87'	Stadium: B.T. Connor Reserve; Attendance: 2,000; Referee: Stewart Mellings

31 May 1981 15	Adelaide City	1–0	Brisbane City	Adelaide
	Mitchell 81'	Report		Stadium: Olympic Sports Field; Attendance: 3,300; Referee: Don Campbell

7 June 1981 16	Brisbane City	2–0	Sydney City	Brisbane
	Gaffney 65'; P. Wilkinson 77'	Report		Stadium: Spencer Park; Attendance: 2,500; Referee: Bob Mee

14 June 1981 17	Canberra City	3–0	Brisbane City	Canberra
	MacLaren 41'; Brennan 56'; Purdie 87'	Report		Stadium: Bruce Stadium; Attendance: 2,891; Referee: Ken Allen

21 June 1981 18	Brisbane City	4–0	Marconi Fairfield	Brisbane
	Vincenzino 52'; P. Wilkinson 62'; Gaffney 69'; Caldwell 71' (pen.)	Report		Stadium: Spencer Park; Attendance: 2,500; Referee: Alf Rodway

28 June 1981 19	Sydney Olympic	1–1	Brisbane City	Sydney
	Rowden 77'	Report	P. Wilkinson 32'	Stadium: Pratten Park; Attendance: 5,346; Referee: Peter Rampley

5 July 1981 20	Brisbane City	1–2	Heidelberg United	Brisbane
	P. Wilkinson 77'	Report	Yzendoorn 79'; Campbell 90'	Stadium: Spencer Park; Attendance: 2,000; Referee: Dave Nugent

12 July 1981 21	Footscray JUST	1–0	Brisbane City	Melbourne
	Verweij 12'	Report		Stadium: Schintler Reserve; Attendance: 1,800; Referee: Chris Bambridge

19 July 1981 22	Brisbane City	1–0	Brisbane Lions	Brisbane
	P. Wilkinson 62'	Report		Stadium: Spencer Park; Attendance: 5,000; Referee: Tim Davies

26 July 1981 23	Blacktown City	1–2	Brisbane City	Sydney
	O'DOnnell 44' (pen.)	Report	Kelso 33'; Conner 79'	Stadium: Gabbie Stadium; Attendance: 3,144; Referee: Tony Boskovic

2 August 1981 24	Brisbane City	1–1	Newcastle KB United	Brisbane
	Hamilton 70'	Report	Sumner 59'	Stadium: Ballymore Stadium; Attendance: 5,000; Referee: Peter Rampley

9 August 1981 25	APIA Leichhardt	2–2	Brisbane City	Sydney
	Soper 15'; Kafka 37'	Report	Hamilton 58'; Gaffney 84'	Stadium: Lambert Park; Attendance: 4,301; Referee: Gary Power

12 August 1981 13	Brisbane City	1–1	South Melbourne	Brisbane
	Kelso 20'	Report	Xanthopoulos 84'	Stadium: Spencer Park; Attendance: 1,500; Referee: Dave Nugent

23 August 1981 27	South Melbourne	0–2	Brisbane City	Melbourne
		Report	Conner 39'; Wilkinson 54'	Stadium: Middle Park Soccer Stadium; Attendance: 7,000; Referee: Chris Bambridge

30 August 1981 28	Brisbane City	1–2	Preston Makedonia	Brisbane
	Hamilton 83'	Report	Lucchesi 3'; Ollerton 37'	Stadium: Spencer Park; Attendance: 2,500; Referee: Col Amos

6 September 1981 29	Brisbane City	3–1	Adelaide City	Brisbane
	Jones 42' (o.g.); Kelso 63'; P. Wilkinson 69'	Report	Jones 26'	Stadium: Spencer Park; Attendance: 2,000; Referee: Jim Fearn

13 September 1981 30	West Adelaide	1–1	Brisbane City	Adelaide
	Forde 76'	Report	Wilkinson 26'	Stadium: Hindmarsh Stadium; Attendance: 1,500; Referee: Jim Rossis

=== NSL Cup ===
Win Draw Loss

8 February 1981 First round	Brisbane City	1–0	Mount Gravatt	Brisbane
	Wilkinson 38'	Report		Stadium: Perry Park; Attendance:

8 June 1981 Second round	Brisbane City	3–0	Mareeba United	Brisbane
	P. Wilkinson 11', 44'; McVeigh 83'	Report		Stadium: Spencer Park; Attendance: 1,000; Referee: Col Amos

17 June 1981 Quarter-finals	West Adelaide	4–2	Brisbane City	Adelaide
	Lorenzoni 18'; Manecas 57' (?); Smythe 88'	Report	Caldwell 11'; Hamilton 48'	Stadium: Hindmarsh Stadium; Attendance: 1,800; Referee: Jim Rossis

== Statistics ==
=== Appearances and goals ===
Includes all competitions. Players with no appearances not included in the list.

No.	Pos.	Nat.	Player	National Soccer League		NSL Cup		Total	
No.	Pos.	Nat.	Player	Apps	Goals	Apps	Goals	Apps	Goals
1	GK	(Australia)	Kim Wishart	9	0	1	0	10	0
2	DF	(Republic of Ireland)	Jimmy Dunne	28	0	3	0	31	0
3	DF	(Australia)	David Ratcliffe	28	1	3	0	31	1
5	DF	(Australia)	Steve Perry	17+3	0	1	0	21	0
6	MF	(Australia)	Larry Gaffney	29	3	2	0	31	3
7	FW	(Hungary)	Joe Palinkas	18+4	2	2	0	24	2
8	MF	(England)	Frank Pimblett	29	0	3	0	32	0
9	FW	(Australia)	Willie Conner	8+8	3	1	0	17	3
10	MF	(Scotland)	Kevin Low	2+3	0	0	0	5	0
11	FW	(Australia)	Kevin Caldwell	14+4	2	2	1	20	3
12	FW	(Australia)	Barry Kelso	17+3	4	0+3	0	23	4
14	MF	(Scotland)	Bobby Hamilton	27	7	2	1	29	8
15	FW	(England)	Paul Wilkinson	29	12	3	2	32	14
16	MF	(Scotland)	John McVeigh	15+2	1	3	1	20	2
17	DF	(Scotland)	Billy Wilkinson	30	0	3	1	33	1
18	MF	(Australia)	David Vincenzino	8+1	1	1+1	0	11	1
19	DF	(Australia)	Michael Tripp	1	0	0	0	1	0
20	GK	(Australia)	Martin Coe	21	0	2	0	23	0
—	FW	(Australia)	Dominic Confessore	0+1	0	1	0	2	0
—	MF	(Australia)	Angelo Falco	0+1	0	0	0	1	0

=== Disciplinary record ===
Includes all competitions. The list is sorted by squad number when total cards are equal. Players with no cards not included in the list.

Rank	No.	Pos.	Nat.	Player	National Soccer League			NSL Cup			Total		
Rank	No.	Pos.	Nat.	Player	Yellow card	Second yellow card	Red card	Yellow card	Second yellow card	Red card	Yellow card	Second yellow card	Red card
1	2	DF	(Australia)	Jimmy Dunne	3	0	1	0	0	0	3	0	1
2	8	MF	(England)	Frank Pimblett	0	0	1	0	0	0	0	0	1
3	3	DF	(Australia)	David Ratcliffe	6	0	0	0	0	0	6	0	0
3	11	FW	(Australia)	Kevin Caldwell	6	0	0	0	0	0	6	0	0
5	12	FW	(Australia)	Barry Kelso	5	0	0	0	0	0	5	0	0
6	6	MF	(Australia)	Larry Gaffney	4	0	0	0	0	0	4	0	0
7	17	DF	(Scotland)	Billy Wilkinson	3	0	0	0	0	0	3	0	0
8	7	FW	(Hungary)	Joe Palinkas	2	0	0	0	0	0	2	0	0
8	14	MF	(Scotland)	Bobby Hamilton	2	0	0	0	0	0	2	0	0
8	15	FW	(England)	Paul Wilkinson	2	0	0	0	0	0	2	0	0
8	16	MF	(Scotland)	John McVeigh	1	0	0	1	0	0	2	0	0
12	5	DF	(Australia)	Steve Perry	1	0	0	0	0	0	1	0	0
12	18	MF	(Australia)	David Vincenzino	1	0	0	0	0	0	1	0	0
Total					36	0	2	1	0	0	37	0	2

=== Clean sheets ===
Includes all competitions. The list is sorted by squad number when total clean sheets are equal. Numbers in parentheses represent games where both goalkeepers participated and both kept a clean sheet; the number in parentheses is awarded to the goalkeeper who was substituted on, whilst a full clean sheet is awarded to the goalkeeper who was on the field at the start of play. Goalkeepers with no clean sheets not included in the list.

Rank	No.	Nat.	Goalkeeper	NSL	NSL Cup	Total
1	20	(Australia)	Martin Coe	9	1	10
2	1	(Australia)	Kim Wishart	2	1	3
Total				11	2	13
