= 1977 Brisbane Lions SC season =

Brisbane Lions
1977 season
- Manager: Les Scheinflug
- Stadium: Perry Park
- National Soccer League: 9th
- NSL Cup: First round
- Top goalscorer: League: Geoff Morris (10); All: Geoff Morris (10)
- Highest home attendance: 7,400 vs. Brisbane City (14 August 1977); National Soccer League
- Lowest home attendance: 2,482 vs. West Adelaide (25 September 1977); National Soccer League
- Average home league attendance: 4,050
- Biggest win: 4–0 vs. Western Suburbs (H) (25 July 1977); National Soccer League
- Biggest defeat: 0–4 vs. Eastern Suburbs (H) (6 June 1977); National Soccer League; 1–5 vs. West Adelaide (A) (27 June 1977); National Soccer League

The 1977 season was the first in the National Soccer League for Brisbane Lions (now Queensland Lions Football Club). In addition to the domestic league, they also participated in the inaugural NSL Cup.

== Players ==
Note: Flags indicate national team as defined under FIFA eligibility rules; some limited exceptions apply. Players may hold more than one non-FIFA nationality.

No.	Pos.	Nation	Player
—	DF	AUS	Colin Bennett
—	GK	NZL	Phil Dando
—		AUS	Charles Dench
—	DF	ENG	Roy Drinkwater
—	MF	AUS	Iain Fagan
—	MF	AUS	Ron Harland
—	MF	AUS	Willie Henderson
—	MF	SCO	Alan Hughes
—		AUS	Laszlo Koroknai
—		AUS	Paul Laszlo
—	DF	AUS	Ian Lawrie
—	GK	NIR	Roddy McKenzie

No.	Pos.	Nation	Player
—	MF	ENG	Geoff Morris
—		AUS	Tom Murray
—	FW	ENG	John Neale
—	DF	AUS	Alan Niven
—	MF	AUS	John Ogden
—		AUS	Ian Park
—	DF	SCO	George Potter
—	MF	ENG	Eddie Spearrit
—	DF	ENG	Alan Venables
—		AUS	Gerry Walker
—		AUS	John Wilkinson
—	DF	AUS	Leon Wilson

== Pre-season and friendlies ==
Win Draw Loss

26–27 March 1977	Brisbane Lions (Australia)	1–1	(Australia) Marconi Fairfield
	Harland 58'		Mariani 2'	Attendance:

== Competitions ==
=== Overall record ===
Competition	First match	Last match	Starting round	Final position	Record							
Competition	First match	Last match	Starting round	Final position	Pld	W	D	L	GF	GA	GD	Win %
National Soccer League	3 April 1977	25 September 1977	Matchday 1	9th	26	9	5	12	27	41	−14	34.62
NSL Cup	21 September 1977		First round	First round	1	0	0	1	2	3	−1	0.00
Total					27	9	5	13	29	44	−15	33.33

Source: Competitions

=== National Soccer League ===
==== League table ====
Pos	Team	Pld	W	D	L	GF	GA	GD	Pts
7	West Adelaide	26	8	10	8	38	32	+6	26
8	Footscray JUST	26	9	6	11	36	39	−3	24
9	Brisbane Lions	26	9	5	12	27	41	−14	23
10	Brisbane City	26	8	6	12	30	35	−5	22
11	South Melbourne	26	7	8	11	27	35	−8	22

Source: rsssf.com
Rules for classification: 1) Points; 2) Goal difference; 3) Goals scored

==== Results summary ====
Overall								Home						Away					
Pld	W	D	L	GF	GA	GD	Pts	W	D	L	GF	GA	GD	W	D	L	GF	GA	GD
26	9	5	12	27	41	−14	32	6	3	4	18	17	+1	3	2	8	9	24	−15

Source: worldfootball.net

==== Results by round ====
Round	1	2	3	4	5	7	8	9	10	11	12	13	14	6	16	17	18	19	20	15	21	22	23	24	25	26
Ground	A	H	A	H	A	A	H	A	H	A	H	A	A	H	A	H	H	A	H	H	A	H	A	H	A	H
Result	D	L	L	L	L	L	D	D	L	L	W	L	W	W	L	W	W	L	W	D	W	D	L	W	W	L
Position	6	10	12	14	14	12	13	13	13	13	13	13	13	13	12	12	12	12	12	12	11	11	12	10	9	9
Points	1	1	1	1	1	1	2	3	3	3	5	5	7	9	9	11	13	13	15	16	18	19	19	21	23	23

Source: worldfootball.net
A = Away; H = Home; W = Win; D = Draw; L = Loss

==== Matches ====
Win Draw Loss

3 April 1977 1	Adelaide City	0–0	Brisbane Lions	Adelaide
		Report		Stadium: Olympic Sports Field; Attendance: 6,320; Referee: Don Campbell

10 April 1977 2	Brisbane Lions	0–1	Canberra City	Brisbane
		Report	Stoddart 51'	Stadium: Perry Park; Attendance: 4,178; Referee: Jack Wood

17 April 1977 3	Western Suburbs	3–0	Brisbane Lions	Sydney
	Perry 23'; Wilson 41'; Harding 71'	Report		Stadium: Sydney Sports Ground; Attendance: 1,037; Referee: Richard Lorenc

24 April 1977 4	Brisbane Lions	0–2	Sydney Olympic	Brisbane
		Report	D. Allan 57', 68'	Stadium: Perry Park; Attendance: 5,111; Referee: Des Miles

1 May 1977 5	Fitzroy United	4–1	Brisbane Lions	Melbourne
	Campbell 52'; Buljevic 56'; Tansey 75'; Taylor 81' (pen.)	Report	Morris 84'	Stadium: Fitzroy Cricket Ground; Attendance: 4,560; Referee: David Yelland

8 May 1977 7	Brisbane City	3–1	Brisbane Lions	Brisbane
	Hermiston 37' (pen.); Echeverrira 71'; Johnston 87'	Report	Morris 77' (pen.)	Stadium: Perry Park; Attendance: 6,418; Referee: Dennis McDermott

22 May 1977 8	Brisbane Lions	1–1	Marconi Fairfield	Brisbane
	Morris 34'	Report	Campbell 31'	Stadium: Perry Park; Attendance: 2,500; Referee: Jack Wood

29 May 1977 9	St George	0–0	Brisbane Lions	Sydney
		Report		Stadium: Sydney Sports Ground; Attendance: 3,164; Referee: Barry Wilkinson

5 June 1977 10	Brisbane Lions	0–4	Eastern Suburbs	Brisbane
		Report	Kershaw 5'; Smith 53', 70', 82'	Stadium: Perry Park; Attendance: 3,100; Referee: Des Miles

11 June 1977 11	South Melbourne	1–0	Brisbane Lions	Melbourne
	Hagegmanouil 80'	Report		Stadium: Middle Park; Attendance: 4,800; Referee: Stewart Mellings

19 June 1977 12	Brisbane Lions	2–1	Mooroolbark	Brisbane
	Fagan 5'; Neale 10'	Report	Tront 84'	Stadium: Perry Park; Attendance: 4,218; Referee: Dave Nugent

26 June 1977 13	West Adelaide	5–1	Brisbane Lions	Adelaide
	Kosmina 4'; Reynolds 19'; McGregor 48'; McCulloch 59'; Zervas 88'	Report	Morris 77' (pen.)	Stadium: Hindmarsh Stadium; Attendance: 5,115; Referee: Don Campbell

2 July 1977 14	Canberra City	1–2	Brisbane Lions	Canberra
	Stark 42'	Report	Morris 37' (pen.), 60'	Stadium: Manuka Oval; Attendance: 1,800; Referee: Peter Rampley

8 July 1977 6	Brisbane Lions	2–0	Footscray JUST	Brisbane
	Morris 63'; Neale 67'	Report		Stadium: Perry Park; Attendance: 2,500; Referee: Dave Nugent

17 July 1977 16	Sydney Olympic	1–0	Brisbane Lions	Sydney
	Botham 55'	Report		Stadium: Sydney Sports Ground; Attendance: 3,470; Referee: Tony Boskovic

24 July 1977 17	Brisbane Lions	4–0	Western Suburbs	Brisbane
	Murray 28', 75', 90'; Laszlo 50'	Report		Stadium: Perry Park; Attendance: 4,326; Referee: Dave Nugent

31 July 1977 18	Brisbane Lions	2–1	Heidelberg United	Brisbane
	Neale 5'; Fagan 87'	Report	Cole 63'	Stadium: Perry Park; Attendance: 4,501; Referee: Dieter Klose

6 August 1977 19	Footscray JUST	4–2	Brisbane Lions	Melbourne
	Rujevic 21'; Palinkas 53'; Ristovski 63', 73'	Report	Laszlo 1'; Morris 28'	Stadium: Middle Park; Attendance: 1,000; Referee: Tony Beazleigh

14 August 1977 20	Brisbane Lions	2–1	Brisbane City	Brisbane
	Morris 30'; Laszlo 41'	Report	Tokesi 28'	Stadium: Perry Park; Attendance: 7,400; Referee: Tony Boskovic

17 August 1977 15	Brisbane Lions	1–1	Adelaide City	Brisbane
	Morris 70'	Report	Marocchi 81'	Stadium: Perry Park; Attendance: 3,207; Referee: Jack Wood

21 August 1977 21	Marconi Fairfield	0–1	Brisbane Lions	Sydney
		Report	Fagan 24'	Stadium: Marconi Stadium; Attendance: 2,453

28 August 1977 22	Brisbane Lions	1–1	St George	Brisbane
	Laszlo 77'	Report	Morgan 87'	Stadium: Perry Park; Attendance: 3,835; Referee: Dave Nugent (Ron Richmond 75')

4 September 1977 23	Eastern Suburbs	2–0	Brisbane Lions	Sydney
	Stevenson 8'; Smith 78'	Report		Stadium: Wentworth Park; Attendance: 2,205; Referee: Tim Davies

11 September 1977 24	Brisbane Lions	2–0	South Melbourne	Brisbane
	Murray 21'; Laszlo 30'	Report		Stadium: Perry Park; Attendance: 3,528; Referee: Bill Jones

18 September 1977 25	Mooroolbark	0–1	Brisbane Lions	Melbourne
	Neale 85'	Report		Stadium: Esther Park; Attendance: 399; Referee: Stewart Mellings

25 September 1977 26	Brisbane Lions	1–4	West Adelaide	Brisbane
	Spearritt 85'	Report	McGregor 38'; Amos 62'; McGachey 71'; Pantelis 74'	Stadium: Perry Park; Attendance: 2,482; Referee: John Tattersall

=== NSL Cup ===
Win Draw Loss

21 September 1977 First round	Brisbane City	3–2	Brisbane Lions	Brisbane
	Echeverria 3'; Caldwell 49', 68'	Report	Spearritt 17'; Neale 75'	Stadium: Perry Park; Attendance: 4,000; Referee: Peter Rampley

== Statistics ==
=== Appearances and goals ===
Includes all competitions. Players with no appearances not included in the list.

No.	Pos.	Nat.	Player	National Soccer League		NSL Cup		Total	
No.	Pos.	Nat.	Player	Apps	Goals	Apps	Goals	Apps	Goals
—	DF	(Australia)	Colin Bennett	23	0	1	0	24	0
—	GK	(New Zealand)	Phil Dando	22+1	0	1	0	24	0
—	—	(Australia)	Charles Dench	1	0	0	0	1	0
—	DF	(England)	Roy Drinkwater	9+1	0	0	0	10	0
—	MF	(Australia)	Iain Fagan	24+2	3	1	0	27	3
—	MF	(England)	Ron Harland	2+1	0	0	0	3	0
—	MF	(Scotland)	Willie Henderson	5+1	0	0+1	0	7	0
—	MF	(Scotland)	Alan Hughes	5+1	0	0	0	6	0
—	—	(Australia)	Laszlo Koroknai	2+2	0	0	0	4	0
—	—	(Australia)	Paul Laszlo	25+1	5	1	0	27	5
—	DF	(Australia)	Ian Lawrie	2+3	0	0	0	5	0
—	GK	(Northern Ireland)	Roddy McKenzie	4	0	0	0	4	0
—	MF	(Australia)	Geoff Morris	21+1	10	1	0	23	10
—	—	(Australia)	Tom Murray	7+1	4	1	0	9	4
—	FW	(England)	John Neale	24+1	4	1	1	26	5
—	DF	(Australia)	Alan Niven	20+2	0	1	0	23	0
—	MF	(Australia)	John Ogden	2	0	0	0	2	0
—	MF	(New Zealand)	Ian Park	21+1	0	1	0	23	0
—	DF	(Scotland)	George Potter	25	0	1	0	26	0
—	MF	(England)	Eddie Spearritt	15	1	1	1	16	2
—	DF	(England)	Alan Venables	7+4	0	0	0	11	0
—	—	(Australia)	Gerry Walker	2+1	0	0	0	3	0
—	—	(Australia)	John Wilkinson	2	0	0	0	2	0
—	DF	(Australia)	Leon Wilson	13+1	0	0	0	14	0

=== Disciplinary record ===
Includes all competitions. The list is sorted by squad number when total cards are equal. Players with no cards not included in the list.

Rank	No.	Pos.	Nat.	Player	National Soccer League			NSL Cup			Total		
Rank	No.	Pos.	Nat.	Player	Yellow card	Second yellow card	Red card	Yellow card	Second yellow card	Red card	Yellow card	Second yellow card	Red card
1	—	DF	(Australia)	Alan Niven	2	0	2	0	0	0	2	0	2
2	—	MF	(Scotland)	Alan Hughes	0	0	1	0	0	0	0	0	1
3	—	MF	(Australia)	Geoff Morris	2	0	0	0	0	0	2	0	0
3	—	FW	(England)	John Neale	2	0	0	0	0	0	2	0	0
3	—	MF	(New Zealand)	Ian Park	1	0	0	1	0	0	2	0	0
3	—	DF	(Scotland)	George Potter	2	0	0	0	0	0	2	0	0
7	—	DF	(Australia)	Colin Bennett	1	0	0	0	0	0	1	0	0
7	—	DF	(England)	Roy Drinkwater	1	0	0	0	0	0	1	0	0
7	—	MF	(Australia)	Iain Fagan	1	0	0	0	0	0	1	0	0
7	—	MF	(England)	Ron Harland	1	0	0	0	0	0	1	0	0
7	—	MF	(England)	Eddie Spearritt	1	0	0	0	0	0	1	0	0
Total					14	0	3	1	0	0	15	0	3

=== Clean sheets ===
Includes all competitions. The list is sorted by squad number when total clean sheets are equal. Numbers in parentheses represent games where both goalkeepers participated and both kept a clean sheet; the number in parentheses is awarded to the goalkeeper who was substituted on, whilst a full clean sheet is awarded to the goalkeeper who was on the field at the start of play. Goalkeepers with no clean sheets not included in the list.

Rank	No.	Nat.	Goalkeeper	NSL	NSL Cup	Total
1	—	(New Zealand)	Phil Dando	6	0	6
2	—	(Northern Ireland)	Roddy McKenzie	1	0	1
Total				7	0	7
