= 1979 Brisbane Lions SC season =

Brisbane Lions
1979 season
- Head Coach: Eddie Spearritt; Matt Carson
- Stadium: Perry Park
- National Soccer League: 9th
- NSL Cup: Second round
- Top goalscorer: League: Tony Brennan (10); All: Tony Brennan (10)
- Highest home attendance: 3,500 vs. Brisbane City (22 April 1979); National Soccer League
- Lowest home attendance: 800 vs. West Adelaide (29 July 1979); National Soccer League
- Average home league attendance: 1,491
- Biggest win: 3–0 vs. Newcastle KB United (6 May 1979); National Soccer League; 3–0 vs. Canberra City (16 September 1979); National Soccer League
- Biggest defeat: 0–6 vs. Adelaide City (17 June 1979); National Soccer League

The 1979 season was the third in the National Soccer League for Brisbane Lions (now Queensland Lions Football Club), based in Brisbane, Queensland, Australia. In addition to the domestic league, they also participated in the NSL Cup. Brisbane Lions finished 9th in their National Soccer League season, and were eliminated in the second round of the NSL Cup.

== Players ==
Note: Flags indicate national team as defined under FIFA eligibility rules; some limited exceptions apply. Players may hold more than one non-FIFA nationality.

No.	Pos.	Nation	Player
2	DF	AUS	Ian Lawrie
3	DF	AUS	Alan Niven
4	MF	ENG	Eddie Spearritt
5	DF	AUS	Colin Bennett
6	DF	SCO	Jim Hermiston
7	MF	SCO	Alan Hughes
8	FW	ENG	Barrie Fairbrother
9	FW	AUS	Craig Wallace
10	MF	AUS	Steve Amos
11	MF	RSA	Paul Ontong
12	MF	AUS	John Ogden
13	MF	AUS	Graham Wilson

No.	Pos.	Nation	Player
14		AUS	Paul Laszlo
15	FW	AUS	Tom McGregor
17	FW	AUS	Craig Low
19	GK	AUS	Tony Scanlan
20	GK	ENG	Nigel Lowndes
—	FW	AUS	Clark Anderson
—	FW	AUS	Tony Brennan
—	FW	AUS	Willie Conner
—		AUS	Jeff Dann
—	MF	SCO	John Lavelle
—	FW	AUS	Ron Millman
—		AUS	John Russell

== Competitions ==
=== Overall record ===
Competition	First match	Last match	Starting round	Final position	Record							
Competition	First match	Last match	Starting round	Final position	Pld	W	D	L	GF	GA	GD	Win %
National Soccer League	9 March 1979	23 September 1979	Matchday 1	9th	26	8	6	12	28	30	−2	30.77
NSL Cup	25 April 1979	20 May 1979	First round	Second round	2	0	1	1	2	3	−1	0.00
Total					28	8	7	13	30	33	−3	28.57

Source: Competitions

=== National Soccer League ===
==== League table ====
Pos	Team	Pld	W	D	L	GF	GA	GD	Pts	Qualification or relegation
1	Marconi Fairfield (C)	26	15	6	5	58	32	+26	40 (Note: A Bonus Point was awarded for victories of 4 goals or more.)	Qualification to Finals series (Note: The Finals series was not considered the championship for the 1979 National Soccer League.)
2	Heidelberg United	26	14	7	5	44	30	+14	36	Qualification to Finals series
3	Sydney City	26	15	3	8	47	29	+18	34	Qualification to Finals series
4	Brisbane City	26	14	5	7	38	30	+8	34	Qualification to Finals series
5	Adelaide City	26	13	6	7	43	27	+16	33	
6	Newcastle KB United	26	11	9	6	43	30	+13	32	
7	West Adelaide	26	10	4	12	28	31	−3	25	
8	APIA Leichhardt	26	11	3	12	29	37	−8	25	
9	Brisbane Lions	26	8	6	12	28	40	−12	22	
10	Footscray JUST	26	8	3	15	29	43	−14	20	
11	St George-Budapest	26	7	6	13	27	43	−16	20	
12	Canberra City	26	6	8	12	25	41	−16	20	
13	Sydney Olympic (R)	26	7	5	14	23	30	−7	19	Relegated to the 1980 NSW State League
14	South Melbourne	26	6	3	17	26	45	−19	16	

Updated to match(es) played on unknown. Source: rsssf.com
Rules for classification: 1) points; 2) goal difference; 3) number of goals scored.
(C) Champions; (R) Relegated

==== Results summary ====
Overall								Home						Away					
Pld	W	D	L	GF	GA	GD	Pts	W	D	L	GF	GA	GD	W	D	L	GF	GA	GD
26	8	6	12	28	40	−12	30	5	1	7	18	24	−6	3	5	5	10	16	−6

Source: worldfootball.net

==== Results by round ====
Round	1	2	3	4	5	6	7	8	9	10	11	12	13	14	16	17	18	19	20	15	22	21	23	24	25	26
Ground	H	A	H	A	H	A	H	A	H	A	H	A	H	H	H	A	A	H	A	A	A	H	H	A	H	A
Result	L	W	L	L	W	L	L	L	W	W	L	W	L	L	W	D	L	L	D	D	D	W	D	D	W	L
Position	11	10	11	11	11	12	12	12	12	11	12	10	12	12	11	11	12	12	11	12	11	11	11	10	9	9
Points	0	2	2	2	4	4	4	4	6	8	8	10	10	10	12	13	13	13	14	15	16	18	19	20	22	22

Source: worldfootball.net
A = Away; H = Home; W = Win; D = Draw; L = Loss

==== Matches ====
Win Draw Loss

9 March 1979 1	Brisbane Lions	1–2	Sydney City	Brisbane
	Hermiston 53'	Report	Souness 40'; Stevenson 76' (pen.)	Stadium: Perry Park; Attendance: 2,000; Referee: Des Miles

18 March 1979 2	Marconi Fairfield	0–1	Brisbane Lions	Sydney
		Report	Wallace 5'	Stadium: Marconi Oval; Attendance: 3,800; Referee: Richard Lorenc

25 March 1979 3	Brisbane Lions	2–3	St George-Budapest	Brisbane
	Hughes 7'; Amos 31'	Report	J. O'Shea 55', 76'; O'Connor 89' (pen.)	Stadium: Perry Park; Attendance: 1,520; Referee: Ken Allen

1 April 1979 4	Footscray JUST	3–1	Brisbane Lions	Melbourne
	Kondarios 20'; Picioane 27', 37'	Report	Spearritt 89'	Stadium: Olympic Park No. 2 Attendance: 3,123; Referee: Chris Bambridge

8 April 1979 5	Brisbane Lions	2–0	South Melbourne	Brisbane
	Hughes 67'; Brennan 72'	Report		Stadium: Perry Park; Attendance: 1,500; Referee: Tony Boskovic

15 April 1979 6	West Adelaide	1–0	Brisbane Lions	Adelaide
	Pillans 49'	Report		Stadium: Hindmarsh Stadium; Attendance: 5,260; Referee: Barry Harwood

22 April 1979 7	Brisbane Lions	1–2	Brisbane City	Brisbane
	Spearritt 85'	Report	Kelso 44', 71'	Stadium: Perry Park; Attendance: 3,500; Referee: Richard Lorenc

29 April 1979 8	APIA Leichhardt	2–1	Brisbane Lions	Sydney
	Rampanti 16'; Wilson 65'	Report	Brennan 21'	Stadium: Wentworth Park; Attendance: 2,473; Referee: Jim Reeves

6 May 1979 9	Brisbane Lions	3–0	Newcastle KB United	Brisbane
	Brennan 37', 65', 79'	Report		Stadium: Perry Park; Attendance: 1,300; Referee: Peter Rampley

13 May 1979 10	Sydney Olympic	0–1	Brisbane Lions	Sydney
		Report	Brennan 70'	Stadium: Pratten Park; Attendance: 2,142; Referee: Bill Jones

3 June 1979 11	Brisbane Lions	1–3	Heidelberg United	Brisbane
	Fairbrother 7'	Report	Cole 9'; Bennett 39' (o.g.); Paton 88'	Stadium: Perry Park; Attendance: 1,200; Referee: Peter Rampley

10 June 1979 12	Canberra City	1–2	Brisbane Lions	Canberra
	Grujicic 82'	Report	Wilson 59'; Brennan 87'	Stadium: Bruce Stadium; Attendance: 7,510; Referee: Ken Allen

17 June 1979 13	Brisbane Lions	0–6	Adelaide City	Brisbane
		Report	Villani 29', 61'; J. Nyskohus 45', 50'; Kent 72'; Dods 79'	Stadium: Perry Park; Attendance: 1,500; Referee: Henry Witschge

24 June 1979 14	Brisbane Lions	0–4	Marconi Fairfield	Brisbane
		Report	Jankovics 22', 49'; Krncevic 60'; Byrne 66'	Stadium: Perry Park; Attendance: 1,500; Referee: Doug Rennie

8 July 1979 16	Brisbane Lions	1–0	Footscray JUST	Brisbane
	Brennan 74'	Report		Stadium: Perry Park; Attendance: 1,200; Referee: Jim Reeves

15 July 1979 17	St George-Budapest	1–1	Brisbane Lions	Sydney
	Gnavi 87'	Report	Fairbrother 25'	Stadium: St George Stadium; Attendance: 1,876; Referee: Peter Rampley

22 July 1979 18	South Melbourne	3–0	Brisbane Lions	Melbourne
	Campbell 59', 81'; Lutton 88'	Report		Stadium: Middle Park Soccer Stadium; Attendance: 2,500; Referee: Stewart Mellings

29 July 1979 19	Brisbane Lions	2–3	West Adelaide	Brisbane
	Brennan 23'; Dooley 71' (o.g.)	Report	Norris 5'; Batchelor 77'; Kosmina 88'	Stadium: Perry Park; Attendance: 800; Referee: Ken Allen

5 August 1979 20	Brisbane City	0–0	Brisbane Lions	Brisbane
		Report		Stadium: Perry Park; Attendance: 4,445; Referee: Tony Boskovic

22 August 1979 15	Sydney City	1–1	Brisbane Lions	Sydney
	Trenter 67'	Report	Fairbrother 43'	Stadium: Sydney Sports Ground; Attendance: 500; Referee: Doug Rennie

25 August 1979 22	Newcastle KB United	2–2	Brisbane Lions	Newcastle
	Boden 10'; Curran 45'	Report	Millman 68'; Hermiston 87' (pen.)	Stadium: Newcastle International Sports Centre; Attendance: 11,118; Referee: Richard Lorenc

29 August 1979 21	Brisbane Lions	2–1	APIA Leichhardt	Brisbane
	Spearritt 36'; Fairbrother 67'	Report	Stone 88'	Stadium: Perry Park; Attendance: 850; Referee: Bob Mee

2 September 1979 23	Brisbane Lions	0–0	Sydney Olympic	Brisbane
		Report		Stadium: Perry Park; Attendance: 1,050; Referee: Bill Jones

9 September 1979 24	Heidelberg United	0–0	Brisbane Lions	Melbourne
		Report		Stadium: Olympic Park; Attendance: 2,500; Referee: Graham Neal

16 September 1979 25	Brisbane Lions	3–0	Canberra City	Brisbane
	Hughes 66', 86'; Brennan 89'	Report		Stadium: Perry Park; Attendance: 1,460; Referee: Peter Rampley

23 September 1979 26	Adelaide City	2–0	Brisbane Lions	Adelaide
	Perin 56'; J. Nyskohus 57'	Report		Stadium: Olympic Sports Field; Attendance: 3,200; Referee: Richard Lorenc

=== NSL Cup ===
Win Draw Loss

25 April 1979 First round	Brisbane Lions	2–2 (a.e.t.) (5–4 p)	(Queensland) Southside Eagles	Brisbane
	Ontong 15'; Hermiston 80'	Report	Millman 13'; McCabe 63' (pen.)	Stadium: Perry Park; Attendance: 2,000; Referee: Jack Wood

20 May 1979 Second round	Brisbane City	1–0	Brisbane Lions	Brisbane
	Low 28'	Report		Stadium: Perry Park; Attendance: 2,500; Referee: Tony Boskovic

== Statistics ==
=== Appearances and goals ===
Includes all competitions. Players with no appearances not included in the list.

No.	Pos.	Nat.	Player	National Soccer League		NSL Cup		Total	
No.	Pos.	Nat.	Player	Apps	Goals	Apps	Goals	Apps	Goals
2	DF	(Australia)	Ian Lawrie	23+2	0	1+1	0	27	0
3	DF	(Australia)	Alan Niven	14	0	2	0	16	0
4	MF	(England)	Eddie Spearritt	18+1	3	2	0	21	3
5	DF	(Australia)	Colin Bennett	26	0	2	0	28	0
6	DF	(Scotland)	Jim Hermiston	26	2	2	1	28	3
7	MF	(Scotland)	Alan Hughes	19+3	4	1	0	23	4
8	FW	(England)	Barrie Fairbrother	16+1	4	1	0	18	4
9	FW	(Australia)	Craig Wallace	10+4	1	0+1	0	15	1
10	MF	(Australia)	Steve Amos	5+1	1	1	0	7	1
11	MF	(South Africa)	Paul Ontong	18+4	0	2	1	24	1
12	MF	(Australia)	John Ogden	12+1	0	0	0	13	0
13	MF	(Australia)	Graham Wilson	7+2	1	1	0	10	1
14	—	(Australia)	Paul Laszlo	5+4	0	1	0	10	0
15	FW	(Australia)	Tom McGregor	4	0	1	0	5	0
17	FW	(Australia)	Craig Low	1+2	0	1+1	0	5	0
19	GK	(Australia)	Tony Scanlan	1	0	1	0	2	0
20	GK	(Australia)	Nigel Lowndes	25	0	1	0	26	0
—	FW	(Australia)	Clark Anderson	0+1	0	0	0	1	0
—	FW	(Australia)	Tony Brennan	21+2	10	1	0	24	10
—	FW	(Australia)	Willie Conner	7	0	0	0	7	0
—	—	(Australia)	Jeff Dann	1	0	0	0	1	0
—	MF	(Scotland)	John Lavelle	9	0	0	0	9	0
—	FW	(Australia)	Ron Millman	11+1	1	0	0	12	1
—	—	(Australia)	John Russell	7+4	0	2	0	13	0

=== Disciplinary record ===
Includes all competitions. The list is sorted by squad number when total cards are equal. Players with no cards not included in the list.

Rank	No.	Pos.	Nat.	Player	National Soccer League			NSL Cup			Total		
Rank	No.	Pos.	Nat.	Player	Yellow card	Second yellow card	Red card	Yellow card	Second yellow card	Red card	Yellow card	Second yellow card	Red card
1	2	DF	(Australia)	Ian Lawrie	0	0	0	1	0	1	1	0	1
1	4	MF	(England)	Eddie Spearritt	1	0	0	0	0	1	1	0	1
3	—	FW	(Australia)	Terry Brennan	5	0	0	0	0	0	5	0	0
4	11	MF	(South Africa)	Paul Ontong	4	0	0	0	0	0	4	0	0
5	7	MF	(Scotland)	Alan Hughes	3	0	0	0	0	0	3	0	0
6	6	DF	(Scotland)	Jim Hermiston	2	0	0	0	0	0	2	0	0
6	9	FW	(Australia)	Craig Wallace	2	0	0	0	0	0	2	0	0
8	5	DF	(Australia)	Colin Bennett	1	0	0	0	0	0	1	0	0
8	8	FW	(England)	Barrie Fairbrother	1	0	0	0	0	0	1	0	0
8	20	GK	(Australia)	Nigel Lowndes	1	0	0	0	0	0	1	0	0
8	—	FW	(Australia)	Ron Millman	1	0	0	0	0	0	1	0	0
Total					21	0	0	1	0	2	22	0	2

=== Clean sheets ===
Includes all competitions. The list is sorted by squad number when total clean sheets are equal. Numbers in parentheses represent games where both goalkeepers participated and both kept a clean sheet; the number in parentheses is awarded to the goalkeeper who was substituted on, whilst a full clean sheet is awarded to the goalkeeper who was on the field at the start of play. Goalkeepers with no clean sheets not included in the list.

Rank	No.	Nat.	Goalkeeper	NSL	NSL Cup	Total
1	20	(Australia)	Nigel Lowndes	9	0	9
Total				9	0	9
