= Brusasco (surname) =

Brusasco is an Italian surname. Notable people with the surname include:

- Ian Brusasco (1928–2021), Australian businessman
- Mark Brusasco (born 1960), Australian former association football player
