= Spearritt =

Spearritt is an English surname mostly popular in England. Notable people with the surname include:

- Eddie Spearritt (born 1947), English football player
- Hannah Spearritt (born 1981), English actress and singer
