= 1978 in Australian soccer =

Soccer in Australia
- Season: 1978

Men's soccer
- National Soccer League: West Adelaide
- NSL Cup: Brisbane City

The 1978 season was the ninth season of national competitive soccer in Australia and 95th overall.

== National teams ==
=== Australia men's national soccer team ===
==== Results and fixtures ====
===== Friendlies =====
| 11 June 1978 | Australia | 1–2 | Greece | Melbourne, Australia |
| | Cole 62' | Report | Ifandidis 63', 77' | Stadium: Olympic Park Stadium; Attendance: 25,000; Referee: Peter Rampley (Australia) |

| 14 June 1978 | Australia | 0–1 | Greece | Adelaide, Australia |
| | | Report | Ifandidis 71' | Stadium: Hindmarsh Stadium; Attendance: 9,502; Referee: Don Campbell (Australia) |

| 18 June 1978 | Australia | 1–1 | Greece | Sydney, Australia |
| | Barnes 77' (pen.) | Report | Karavitis 12' | Stadium: Sydney Cricket Ground; Attendance: 15,000; Referee: David Yelland (Australia) |

=== Australia men's national under-20 soccer team ===
==== Results and fixtures ====
===== 1978 OFC U-20 Championship =====
| Pos | Team | Pld | W | D | L | GF | GA | GD | Pts | Qualification |
|---|---|---|---|---|---|---|---|---|---|---|
| 1 | Australia | 3 | 3 | 0 | 0 | 16 | 2 | +14 | 6 | Advance to Inter-continental qualification |
| 2 | Fiji | 3 | 1 | 1 | 1 | 6 | 6 | 0 | 3 | |
| 3 | New Zealand (H) | 3 | 1 | 1 | 1 | 6 | 3 | +3 | 3 | |
| 4 | Papua New Guinea | 3 | 0 | 0 | 3 | 0 | 17 | −17 | 0 | |

Source: RSSSF
(H) Hosts

| 11 November 1978 | Australia | 9–0 | Papua New Guinea | Auckland, New Zealand |
| | Jennings ?', ?'; Tredinnick ?', ?'; Krncevic ?', ?'; Raskopoulos ?'; Moulis ?'; Christopoulos ?' | Report | | Referee: A. Blackburn (New Zealand) |

| 14 November 1978 | Australia | 5–1 | Fiji | Auckland, New Zealand |
| | Krncevic ?', ?', ?' (pen.); Hunter ?'; Tredinnick ?' | Report | Saleem ?' | Referee: S. Pouru (Papua New Guinea) |

| 16 November 1978 | New Zealand | 1–2 | Australia | Auckland, New Zealand |
| | Broeke ?' | Report | Selemidis ?'; Krncevic ?' | Referee: H. Naicker (Fiji) |

== Domestic soccer ==
=== National Soccer League ===
| Pos | Team | Pld | W | D | L | GF | GA | GD | Pts | Qualification |
|---|---|---|---|---|---|---|---|---|---|---|
| 1 | West Adelaide (C) | 26 | 16 | 4 | 6 | 42 | 27 | +15 | 36 | Qualification to Finals series (Note: The Finals series was not considered the championship for the 1978 National Soccer League.) |
| 2 | Eastern Suburbs | 26 | 15 | 5 | 6 | 49 | 27 | +22 | 35 | Qualification to Finals series |
| 3 | South Melbourne | 26 | 12 | 8 | 6 | 45 | 30 | +15 | 32 | Qualification to Finals series |
| 4 | Marconi Fairfield | 26 | 12 | 6 | 8 | 46 | 31 | +15 | 30 | Qualification to Finals series |
| 5 | Fitzroy United | 26 | 9 | 8 | 9 | 39 | 39 | 0 | 26 | |
| 6 | Brisbane Lions | 26 | 8 | 10 | 8 | 37 | 39 | −2 | 26 | |
| 7 | St George-Budapest | 26 | 11 | 3 | 12 | 41 | 40 | +1 | 25 | |
| 8 | Sydney Olympic | 26 | 9 | 7 | 10 | 35 | 43 | −8 | 25 | |
| 9 | Western Suburbs | 26 | 9 | 6 | 11 | 41 | 45 | −4 | 24 | |
| 10 | Adelaide City | 26 | 9 | 6 | 11 | 38 | 44 | −6 | 24 | |
| 11 | Newcastle KB United | 26 | 6 | 10 | 10 | 33 | 40 | −7 | 22 | |
| 12 | Footscray JUST | 26 | 7 | 8 | 11 | 29 | 37 | −8 | 22 | |
| 13 | Canberra City | 26 | 5 | 10 | 11 | 28 | 41 | −13 | 20 | |
| 14 | Brisbane City | 26 | 7 | 3 | 16 | 29 | 49 | −20 | 17 | |

Source: rsssf.com
Rules for classification: 1) Points; 2) Goal difference; 3) Goals scored
(C) Champions

=== NSL Cup ===
==== Final ====
8 October 1978

| Brisbane City | 2–1 | Adelaide City |
|---|---|---|
| Kelso 28'; Pimblett 77' | Report | Zoran Matić 31' |

Perry Park, Brisbane
Attendance: 4,964
Referee: Tony Boskovic
