= Ian Brusasco =

Australian businessman (1928–2021)

Ian Brusasco AO
- Born: Italo Prospero Brusasco; 4 October 1928; Lannercost, North Queensland
- Died: 13 May 2021 (aged 92)
- Other name: Jim Brusasco
- Education: St Joseph's Nudgee College
- Alma mater: University of Queensland
- Occupation: Pharmacist
- Spouse: Patricia Brusasco
- Children: 3 including Mark Brusasco

Ian Brusasco AO (4 October 1928 – 13 May 2021) was an Australian businessman, pharmacist, and sports administrator. He held leadership roles across various sectors in the state of Queensland, including health, transport, media, and sport. Brusasco was also an alderman of the Brisbane City Council for 14 years and played a significant role in the development of soccer in Australia.

== Early life and education ==
Born Italo Prospero Brusasco in Lannercost, North Queensland, Brusasco was the son of Italian immigrants Felice and Irma (née Torre), who arrived in Australia from Cuccaro Monferrato in 1923. In 1969, he legally changed his name to Ian. His early education took place in Ingham and Brisbane, followed by secondary schooling at St Joseph's Nudgee College from 1943 to 1947. Brusasco initially studied medicine at the University of Queensland but later switched to pharmacy, qualifying in 1955.

== Career ==
=== Pharmacy and business ===
After qualifying as a pharmacist, Brusasco opened his first pharmacy in Brisbane's Albert Street and eventually operated several businesses in the area with his wife, Patricia Anne Brusasco (née Wilson). He later served on various boards including WorkCover Queensland, Queensland Investment Corporation, and Foodbank Queensland.

=== Political involvement ===
Brusasco joined the Australian Labor Party (ALP) in about 1960. He was an unsuccessful candidate for the electoral district of Kurilpa at the 1969 Queensland state election. In 1972, Brusasco was again unsuccessful, falling short of winning the electoral district of Nundah. He was elected as an alderman on the Brisbane City Council in 1970. He served until 1984, representing the wards of Toombul, Lutwyche, and Spring Hill, and chaired the Health and Planning Committees.

Brusasco played a pivotal role in reviving the ALP's finances in Queensland by successfully managing the struggling AM radio station 4KQ, which was sold in 1986. He then became chairman of Labor Holdings, overseeing investments from the sale.

== Contributions to sport ==
=== Rugby union ===
As a youth, Brusasco played for St Joseph's College, Nudgee and later for the University of Queensland and Brothers. Brusasco represented Queensland five times and was considered for national selection before illness curtailed his playing career.

=== Soccer ===
Brusasco began his involvement in soccer administration in 1956 serving as secretary of Azzurri, where his father was the chairman. By the early 1960s, he had relinquished his role on the Azzurri executive committee to become president of the Queensland Soccer Federation (QSF). His first stint as QSF president was between 1961 and 1965. He returned to the role in 1981, serving until 1988.

He led delegations for World Cup qualifiers and youth tournaments, and served in senior roles within the Oceania Football Confederation.

He served as vice-chairman of the Australian Soccer Federation (now Football Australia) when it was founded in 1961. He later served as chairman between 1988 and 1990.

Brusasco became chairman of the Brisbane Strikers in 1993. Under his stewardship, the club won the National Soccer League championship in 1997. He stepped down as chairman in 1999.

=== Other roles ===
He was a founding board member of the Queensland Academy of Sport and served until 1997. Brusasco also chaired the Brisbane World Masters Games from 1993 to 1994.

== Honours ==
- Member of the Order of Australia (AM) in 1988 for service to soccer
- Centenary Medal in 2001 for service to business and commerce
- Officer of the Order of Australia (AO) in 2012 for distinguished service to public administration and community organisations
- Named a Queensland Great in 2008
- Awarded an honorary doctorate by Griffith University in 2013

== Death ==
Brusasco died on 13 May 2021 at Wesley Hospital in Brisbane at the age of 92.
