= George Potter (footballer) =

Scottish footballer (born 1946)

Personal information
- Full name: George Ross Potter
- Date of birth: 7 October 1946 (age 80)
- Place of birth: Arbroath, Scotland
- Height: 5 ft 7 in (1.70 m)
- Position: Defender

Youth career
- –1964: Arbroath Lads Club

Senior career*
Years	Team	Apps	(Gls)
1964–1968	Forfar Athletic	106	(4)
1968–1969	Luton Town	8	(0)
1969–1971	Torquay United	36	(0)
1971–1976	Hartlepool United	213	(4)
1976	Gateshead United		
1977–1978	Brisbane Lions	51	(0)
1979–1980	Brisbane City	50	(1)
Total		464	(9)

Managerial career
- 1981: Brisbane City
- * Club domestic league appearances and goals

George Ross Potter (born 7 October 1946) is a Scottish former professional footballer who played as a defender. He played in Scotland for Forfar Athletic, before moving to England to play for Football League clubs Luton Town, Torquay United and Hartlepool United. He later played non-League football for Gateshead United, and in Australia with Brisbane Lions and Brisbane City.

== Career ==
Potter was born in Arbroath, Scotland, on 7 October 1946. He started his career with Forfar Athletic, where he made 106 appearances and scored four goals between 1964 and 1968, after joining the club from Arbroath Victoria. He signed for English club Luton Town in February 1968, for a fee of around £2,000. He made 8 appearances whilst at Luton Town.

In summer 1969, Potter moved to Torquay United on a free transfer, reuniting him with manager Allan Brown, who he played under at Luton. He made 36 league appearances for the club over two seasons.

Potter joined Hartlepool United on a free transfer during summer 1971. During his time at Hartlepool he was used as both a defender and as a midfielder, and became club captain. He made 213 appearances for the club and scored four goals.

Potter was a guest player for Crook Town for a six-game tour of India in summer 1976.

On 1 September 1976, it was announced that Potter had been released by Hartlepool, and had agreed a deal to play in Australia. He had a spell with non-league club Gateshead United, before he played with Brisbane Lions during the 1977 and 1978 seasons, and later joined Brisbane City for the 1979 and 1980 seasons. He later became head coach of Brisbane City.
