= 1978 National Soccer League =

Australian soccer season

National Soccer League
- Season: 1978
- Dates: 5 March — 17 September 1978
- Matches: 182
- Goals: 532 (2.92 per match)
- Top goalscorer: Ken Boden; Clive Eaton (14 goals each)
- Best goalkeeper: Allan Maher (10 clean sheets)
- Biggest home win: Eastern Suburbs 5–0 Sydney Olympic (28 March 1978); South Melbourne 5–0 Adelaide City (13 August 1978)
- Highest scoring: Marconi Fairfield 6–2 Western Suburbs (16 April 1978)
- Longest winning run: 8 matches West Adelaide
- Longest unbeaten run: 13 matches Marconi Fairfield
- Longest winless run: 15 matches Canberra City
- Longest losing run: 7 matches Brisbane City
- Highest attendance: 18,000; South Melbourne 1–1 Fitzroy United (2 April 1978)
- Lowest attendance: 330; Brisbane Lions 1–1 South Melbourne (26 March 1978)
- Total attendance: 848,226
- Average attendance: 4,686

The 1978 National Soccer League was the second season of the National Soccer League, the former top-tier Australian soccer league, since its establishment in 1977. The premiers were West Adelaide.

== Teams ==
=== Stadiums and locations ===
Locations of the 1978 National Soccer League teams

Note: Table lists in alphabetical order.

Team	Location	Stadium	Capacity
Adelaide City	Adelaide	Olympic Sports Field	5,000
Brisbane City	Brisbane	Perry Park	5,000
Brisbane Lions	Brisbane	Perry Park	5,000
Canberra City	Canberra; Queanbeyan	Manuka Oval; Seiffert Oval	16,000; 15,000
Eastern Suburbs	Sydney	Sydney Sports Ground	35,000
Fitzroy United	Melbourne	Olympic Park Stadium	18,500
Footscray	Melbourne	Middle Park Stadium	18,000
Marconi Fairfield	Sydney	Marconi Stadium	9,000
Newcastle KB United	Newcastle	Newcastle International Sports Centre	30,000
South Melbourne	Melbourne	Middle Park Stadium	18,000
St George	Sydney	Sydney Sports Ground; Marconi Stadium	35,000; 9,000
Sydney Olympic	Sydney	Sydney Sports Ground; Wentworth Park	35,000; 10,000
Western Suburbs	Sydney	Sydney Sports Ground; Englefield Stadium	35,000 ?
West Adelaide	Adelaide	Hindmarsh Stadium	16,500

== League table ==
Pos	Team	Pld	W	D	L	GF	GA	GD	Pts	Qualification
1	West Adelaide (C)	26	16	4	6	42	27	+15	36	Qualification to Finals series (Note: The Finals series was not considered the championship for the 1978 National Soccer League.)
2	Eastern Suburbs	26	15	5	6	49	27	+22	35	Qualification to Finals series
3	South Melbourne	26	12	8	6	45	30	+15	32	Qualification to Finals series
4	Marconi Fairfield	26	12	6	8	46	31	+15	30	Qualification to Finals series
5	Fitzroy United	26	9	8	9	39	39	0	26	
6	Brisbane Lions	26	8	10	8	37	39	−2	26	
7	St George-Budapest	26	11	3	12	41	40	+1	25	
8	Sydney Olympic	26	9	7	10	35	43	−8	25	
9	Western Suburbs	26	9	6	11	41	45	−4	24	
10	Adelaide City	26	9	6	11	38	44	−6	24	
11	Newcastle KB United	26	6	10	10	33	40	−7	22	
12	Footscray JUST	26	7	8	11	29	37	−8	22	
13	Canberra City	26	5	10	11	28	41	−13	20	
14	Brisbane City	26	7	3	16	29	49	−20	17	

Source: rsssf.com
Rules for classification: 1) Points; 2) Goal difference; 3) Goals scored
(C) Champions

== Results ==
Home \ Away	ADC	BRC	BRL	CAN	ESU	FIT	FOO	MAR	NUN	SME	STG	SYO	WSA	WSU
Adelaide City	—	3–2	1–4	3–1	0–1	3–2	0–1	4–0	1–1	1–1	1–0	0–1	1–2	4–2
Brisbane City	2–1	—	0–1	1–0	0–3	1–1	3–0	0–3	1–2	3–4	1–4	3–2	0–1	0–0
Brisbane Lions	3–1	1–2	—	2–2	1–1	1–1	0–0	0–3	2–1	1–1	0–0	1–2	1–0	3–1
Canberra City	2–2	4–0	2–1	—	1–2	2–2	1–1	0–0	2–2	0–3	1–1	1–3	1–1	2–2
Eastern Suburbs	1–2	2–0	1–3	3–0	—	2–1	1–2	0–0	1–0	0–0	4–2	5–0	2–1	3–0
Fitzroy United	3–0	1–0	0–0	0–1	1–1	—	0–1	4–1	1–0	4–1	1–4	3–1	1–1	0–3
Footscray	0–1	2–2	4–0	1–2	1–1	1–2	—	0–2	0–1	0–2	2–0	2–3	2–2	2–3
Marconi Fairfield	1–1	3–2	3–1	2–0	1–2	4–0	1–2	—	4–2	1–1	2–1	0–0	2–0	6–2
Newcastle KB United	2–2	2–3	2–2	3–0	1–4	2–2	1–1	1–0	—	1–1	1–2	1–1	0–1	2–1
South Melbourne	5–0	0–1	2–1	0–0	3–0	1–1	4–0	0–3	3–0	—	5–2	1–1	0–2	2–1
St George-Budapest	2–1	2–0	2–2	2–1	1–3	2–0	3–1	2–1	2–3	0–2	—	1–2	0–1	1–0
Sydney Olympic	2–1	2–1	2–4	1–2	0–2	1–3	1–1	1–1	1–1	1–2	2–0	—	2–4	0–1
West Adelaide	1–1	2–0	3–0	2–0	3–2	3–2	1–2	2–1	1–0	3–1	1–4	0–1	—	2–0
Western Suburbs	2–3	3–1	2–2	1–0	3–2	2–3	0–0	3–1	1–1	3–0	2–1	2–2	1–2	—

Source: OzFootball.net
Legend: Blue = home team win; Yellow = draw; Red = away team win.

== Finals series ==
The top four teams in the league entered a playoff series, however the winner of the grand final match was not considered the overall winner of the NSL season, unlike other NSL grand finals.

== Individual awards ==
- Player of the Year: Ken Boden (Newcastle KB United)
- U-21 Player of the Year: Ian Souness (Eastern Suburbs)
- Top Scorer(s): Ken Boden (Newcastle KB United – 14 goals) Clive Eaton (Western Suburbs – 14 goals)
- Coach of the Year: Gary Chaldi (Eastern Suburbs)
