= Charles Dench =

English cricketer and Test match umpire

Charles Edward Dench (September 6, 1873 – June 28, 1958) was an English first-class cricketer and Test match umpire. Born in 1873 in East Stoke, Nottinghamshire, he played 91 matches for Nottinghamshire as a right-handed batsman and right arm medium bowler between 1897 and 1902. He scored 2660 runs with a best of 88 and took 78 wickets, including a haul of 7 for 28. He then turned to umpiring, standing in the 1909 Ashes Test at Lord's. He died in 1958 in Sherwood, Nottingham.
