= Roddy McKenzie (footballer, born 1945) =

Northern Ireland footballer (born 1945)

Personal information
- Date of birth: 31 July 1945 (age 81)
- Place of birth: Kilkeel, Northern Ireland
- Position: Goalkeeper

Youth career
- Drumchapel Amateurs

Senior career*
Years	Team	Apps	(Gls)
1963–1973	Airdrieonians	256	(0)
1973–1975	Hibernian	7	(0)
1975–1977	Clydebank	29	(0)
1977–1978	Brisbane Lions	8	(0)
Total		300	(0)

International career
1967–1969	Northern Ireland U23	3	(0)
1967	Northern Ireland	1	(0)
- * Club domestic league appearances and goals

Roddy McKenzie (born 31 July 1945) is a former professional footballer, who played as goalkeeper for Airdrieonians, Hibernian and Clydebank.

McKenzie was capped once by Northern Ireland, in a 1966–67 British Home Championship match against Wales. He also played three times for the Northern Ireland under-23 team.
