= John Coyne (soccer) =

Footballer (born 1951)

Personal information
- Full name: John David Coyne
- Date of birth: 18 July 1951 (age 75)
- Place of birth: Liverpool, England
- Position: Striker

Senior career*
Years	Team	Apps	(Gls)
1971–1972	Tranmere Rovers	15	(3)
1972–1974	Hartlepool United	55	(10)
1974	Boston Minutemen	16	(7)
1974	Dallas Tornado	4	(0)
1975	Toronto Metros-Croatia	22	(7)
1975–1976	Wigan Athletic	3	(2)
1976	Stockport County	4	(0)
1976	Hartford Bicentennials	24	(9)
1977–1980	Brisbane City	68	(8)
1980–1981	APIA Leichhardt	28	(3)
- Forrestfield United
Total		169+	(36+)

International career
1979–1980	Australia	4	(0)
- * Club domestic league appearances and goals

John David Coyne (born 18 July 1951) is a former professional footballer who played as a striker. Active as a professional in England, the United States and Australia, Coyne made over 150 career appearances. Born in England, he played international football for Australia.

== Early and personal life ==
Born in Liverpool, England, he is the father of footballers Jamie Coyne and Chris Coyne.

== Club career ==
Coyne played in England for Tranmere Rovers, Hartlepool United, Wigan Athletic (scoring twice in three Northern Premier League games) and Stockport County, making a combined total of 74 appearances in the Football League. Coyne also spent three seasons in the NASL, playing with the Boston Minutemen, the Dallas Tornado, the Toronto Metros-Croatia and the Hartford Bicentennials. Coyne ended his career in Australia, playing with Brisbane City, APIA Leichhardt and Forrestfield United.

== International career ==
Coyne made his full international debut for Australia against Taiwan in Taipei in November 1979. He played the last of his four internationals in August 1980 against Mexico in Sydney. He also played four B-internationals for Australia in 1979 and 1980.

== Coaching career ==
Coyne is currently an assistant coach at Perth SC in the Football West Premier League.
