= David Ratcliffe =

Australian footballer

Personal information
- Date of birth: 9 March 1957 (age 69)
- Place of birth: Dewsbury, England
- Position: Central defender

Youth career
- 1972–1975: Bradford City

Senior career*
Years	Team	Apps	(Gls)
1975–1978	Bradford City	28	(1)
1979–1981	Brisbane City		
1982–1986	St. George		
1987	Sydney Olympic		
1988	Wollongong City		
1989	St. George		
1989–1992	Wollongong City		
1992	Mount Pritchard		

International career
1982–1986	Australia	21	(1)

Managerial career
- 1987: Sydney Olympic
- 1989-1995: Wollongong City
- 1995-1997: Sydney Olympic
- 1999-2000: Sydney United
- * Club domestic league appearances and goals

David Ratcliffe (born 9 March 1957) is a former professional footballer. Born in England, he represented Australia at international level.

== Career ==
Born in Dewsbury, Ratcliffe joined Bradford City as an amateur in July 1972, joining the first-team in March 1975. He made 28 league appearances, scoring once, and two FA Cup appearances, before leaving the club in June 1978. He later played in Australia for Brisbane City, St. George, Sydney Olympic, Wollongong City and Mount Pritchard.

He also earned 21 international caps for Australia between 1982 and 1986.

He managed Wollongong City, Sydney Olympic, and Sydney United in the Australian National Soccer League.

== Sources ==
- Frost, Terry (1988). Bradford City A Complete Record 1903-1988. Breedon Books Sport. ISBN 0-907969-38-0.
