= Billy Wilkinson =

Scottish footballer

Personal information
- Full name: William Wilkinson
- Date of birth: 4 April 1951 (age 75)
- Position: Full back

Youth career
- St Anthonys

Senior career*
Years	Team	Apps	(Gls)
1967–1974	Dumbarton	97	(0)
1974–1978	Alloa Athletic	125	(6)
1979–1985	Brisbane City	143	(3)
- * Club domestic league appearances and goals

William Wilkinson (born 4 April 1951) is a Scottish former professional footballer who began his career in 1967–68 playing for Dumbarton. His career breakthrough came in the 1971–72 season, making 23 appearances and contributing to Dumbarton's promotion to Scottish Football League Division One. Over the following two seasons, Wilkinson made 51 appearances before moving to Alloa Athletic in Division Two, where he scored 6 goals in 120 appearances. He later moved to Brisbane, Australia, where he played in the National Soccer League with Brisbane City. Wilkinson's son, Barry, returned to Scotland to join Dumbarton and spent two years with the club from 1998 to 2000.
