= Mark Brusasco =

Australian soccer player

Personal information
- Full name: Mark Brusasco
- Date of birth: 24 August 1960 (age 66)
- Place of birth: Australia
- Position: Striker

Senior career*
Years	Team	Apps	(Gls)
1978–1980	Brisbane City	30	(3)

International career^{‡}
1980	Australia	1	(0)
- * Club domestic league appearances and goals as of 10 July 2010 ‡ National team caps and goals as of 10 July 2010

Mark Brusasco (born 24 August 1960) is an Australian former association football player.

== Early life and education ==
He is the son of Ian Brusasco AO a former Brisbane city councilor and later president of Soccer Australia (now Football Federation Australia). Between 1973 and 1977 Brusasco attended Brisbane Grammar School.

=== Schoolboy rugby ===
Brusasco represented Queensland Schoolboys in rugby union.

== Soccer career ==
=== Club career ===
Brusasco played in the National Soccer League for Brisbane City.

=== International career ===
Brusasco made one full international appearance as a substitute in Australia's defeat of Papua New Guinea in the 1980 OFC Nations Cup.
