= Eddie Spearritt =

English footballer

Personal information
- Full name: Edward Alfred Spearritt
- Date of birth: 31 January 1947 (age 79)
- Place of birth: Lowestoft, East Suffolk, England
- Position: Midfielder

Youth career
- 1963–1965: Ipswich Town

Senior career*
Years	Team	Apps	(Gls)
1965–1969	Ipswich Town	72	(13)
1969–1974	Brighton & Hove Albion	210	(22)
1974–1976	Carlisle United	31	(1)
1976–1977	Gillingham	19	(1)
1977–1980	Brisbane Lions	56	(7)
- * Club domestic league appearances and goals

Edward Alfred Spearritt (born 31 January 1947) is an English retired footballer who played as a midfielder. He played for Ipswich Town, Brighton & Hove Albion, Carlisle United and Gillingham. He spent some seasons in the then-top level of the English football league system while with Ipswich and Carlisle. He won Brighton & Hove Albion player of the year.

He is the uncle of Hannah Spearritt, a member of S Club 7.
