= Perry Park, Brisbane =

Sports ground in Brisbane, Australia

Coordinates: 27°26′36″S 153°2′22″E

Perry Park
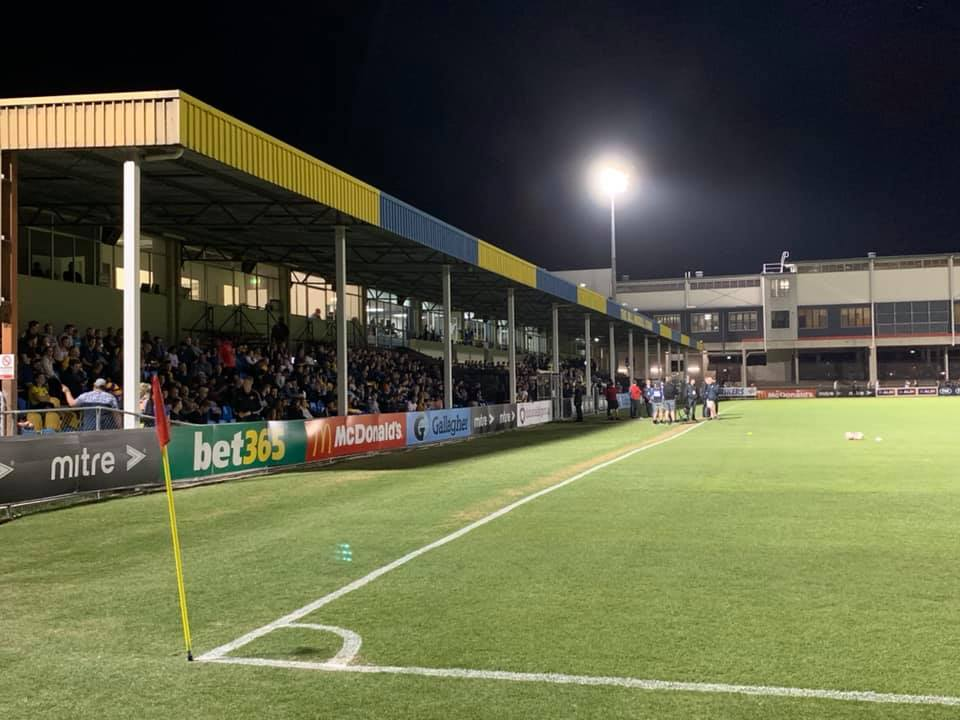
- Perry Park during the FFA Cup semi final match between Brisbane Strikers and Melbourne City, which attracted a crowd of 3706 on 1 October 2019.
- Interactive map of Perry Park
- Location: Bowen Hills
- Capacity: 5,000
- Record attendance: 8,658 (1977 NSL Cup final)
- Public transit: Bowen Hills railway station

Tenants
- Brisbane City FC 1977—1980; Brisbane Lions 1977—1979; Brisbane United 1991—1993; Fortitude Valley Diehards 2002—2003; Brisbane Roar FC (W-League) 2014, 2024; Moreton City Excelsior (Australian Championship) 2025; Brisbane Strikers FC 1993—1995, 2003—present

Perry Park is a 5,000-capacity sporting ground located in Bowen Hills, Brisbane, Queensland, Australia. Perry Park is home to the Brisbane Strikers, which plays in Queensland Premier League 1.mPerry Park is owned by Brisbane City Council, and managed by the YMCA, who run facilities in the complex. Brisbane Strikers FC hold a sub-lease from the YMCA.

== History ==
Scotsman William Raff was granted ownership of the land in 1857. He then subdivided the land in 1875, and the lot where Perry Park is now situated was sold to William Perry, among three other lots. Mr Perry was a prominent Brisbane ironmonger. He used the land essentially as his family cattle and horse paddock.

=== Australian rules football ===
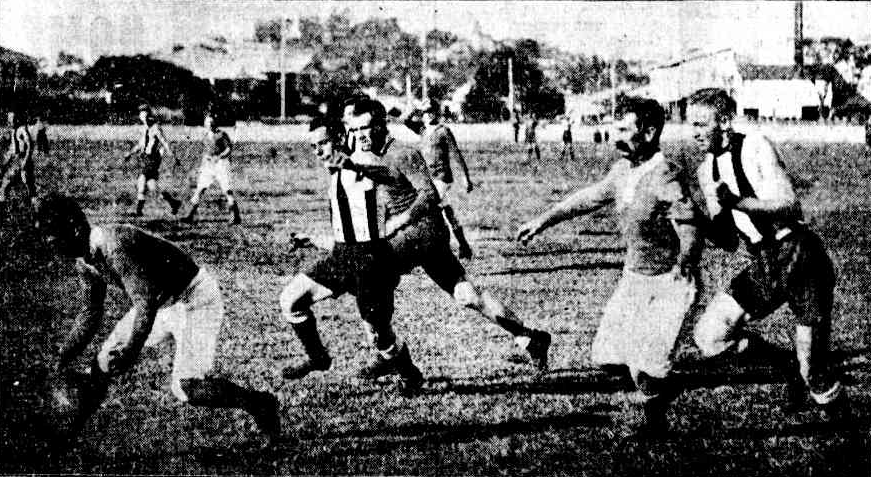
Action from the 1923 QANFL Grand Final between Brisbanes and Valleys

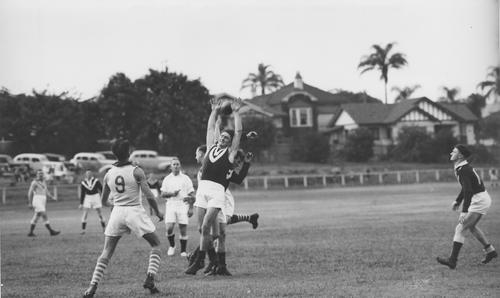
Taringa vs Wests Australian rules football match QANFL match in the 1930s

In its oval configuration Perry Park was primarily used as an Australian rules football and cricket between the 1920s and 1950s. From 1923 it was home to the Queensland Australian Football League and the Mayne Football Club from 1925. The ground hosted 27 QANFL Grand Finals and many interstate games. The QAFL outgrew Perry Park in the 1950s, leaving it for the Brisbane Exhibition Ground and the Brisbane Cricket Ground.

=== Cricket ===
It was home to the Valley District Cricket Club from 1925 to 1942 and 1948 to 1967.

=== Soccer ===
Brisbane City Council acquired the land for soccer grounds in 1967 and converted the oval into two rectangular pitches with the main pitch along Abbotsford Road allocated as the main Perry Park stadium.

In 1977, Perry Park Stadium hosted its first National Soccer League (NSL) game between Brisbane City and Sydney club Marconi Fairfield.

Perry Park hosted its sole international football match on 20 September 1992, when the Australian national football team hosted Tahiti in a 1994 FIFA World Cup qualifier, as part of the Oceania Football Confederation qualifying draw.

== Brisbane Strikers ==
The ground is home to the Brisbane Strikers; however the Strikers did not play all of its home games there during its reign in the National Soccer League (alternating between Lang Park (now Suncorp Stadium), Ballymore and Perry Park). The club now plays all of its home games at Perry Park in the National Premier Leagues Queensland.

In 2016, the Strikers hosted Melbourne City in the FFA Cup, losing 1–2 in the Round of 16 in front of a sell-out 3571 crowd (the crowd being capped due to security concerns). The match was Tim Cahill's first in City colours.

The following year, the Strikers hosted former NSL club Heidelberg United in the 2017 National Premier Leagues final. The Strikers lost 0–2 in front of a crowd of 1105.

As part of the Strikers' aborted bid for an A-League licence in 2018, the club produced plans for a complete rebuild of the facility, which would have seen the current Bill Waddell stand demolished and the pitched moved to the east to accommodate a 15,694-seat boutique stadium.

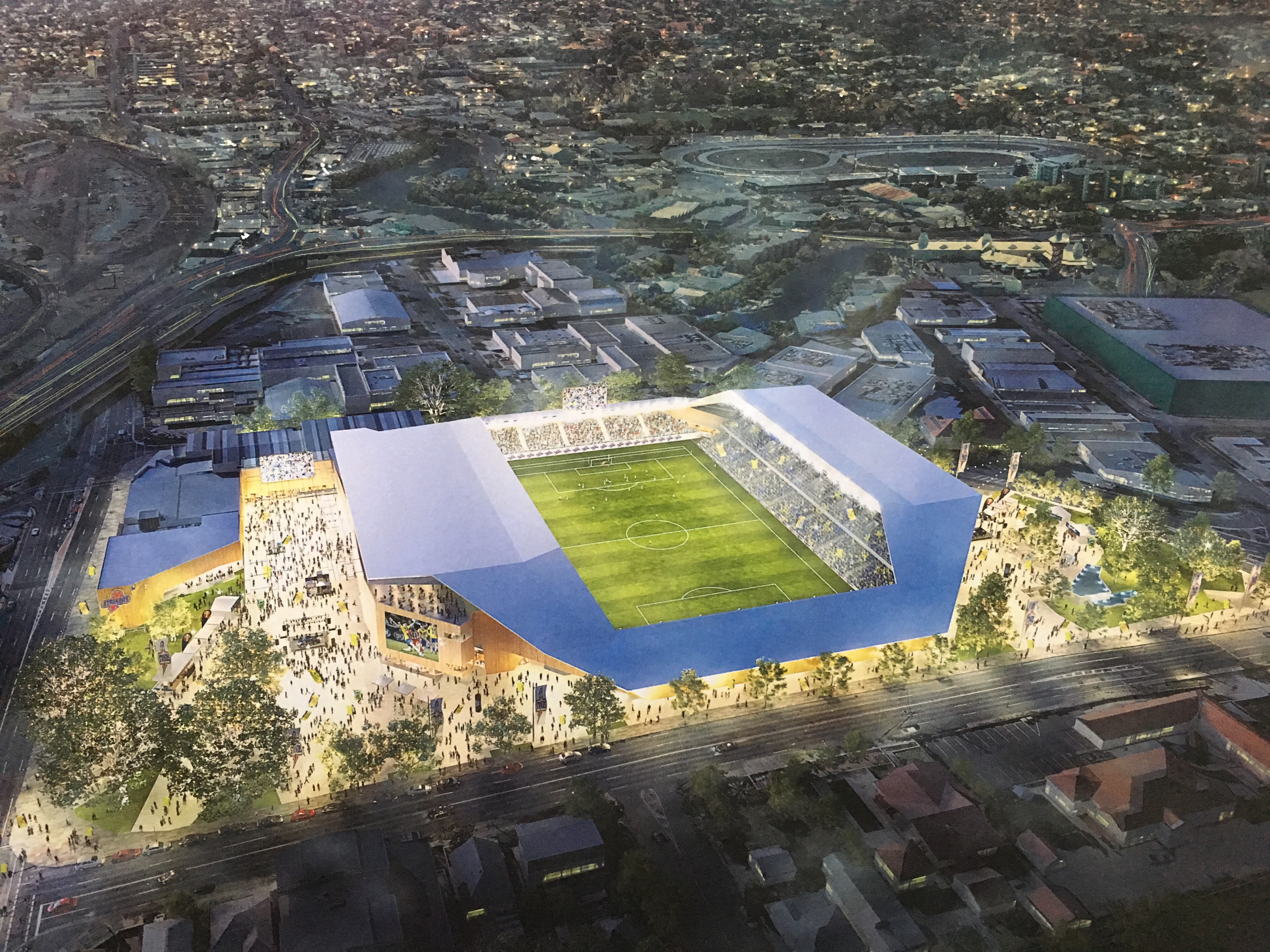
Cox Architects' design for a boutique stadium at Perry Park.
