= Brisbane City FC =

Brisbane City
- Full name: Brisbane City Football Club
- Nickname: The Azzurri
- Founded: 1952; 74 years ago
- Ground: Spencer Park
- Capacity: 10,000 (3,000 seated)
- Chairperson: Emelia Chalker
- Head Coach: Peter Gaffney
- League: NPL Queensland
- 2026: 5th of 12
- Website: https://www.brisbanecityfc.com.au/
Home colours	Away colours

Brisbane City Football Club is an Australian association football club based in Newmarket, Brisbane, Queensland. Founded in 1952, the club competed in the National Soccer League until the 1986 season where they were relegated back to State League Competition. Brisbane City competed in the National Premier Leagues Queensland from 2013, until they were relegated to the lower tier Football Queensland Premier League with one match remaining in the 2020 season. They then won 20 out of 20 matches in the 2021 season to earn immediate promotion back to the National Premier Leagues Queensland. Home matches are played at Spencer Park.

== National Soccer League ==
Chart of yearly table positions for Brisbane City in NSL

In 1977 City became a foundation member of the National Soccer League. City's first match was a 0–1 defeat to Marconi at Perry Park on 3 April 1977 in front of a crowd of 5,214.

Despite struggling in the first two seasons, including finishing bottom, they won the NSL Cup in those two years. In 1977 City defeated Marconi 5–3 on penalties after a 1–1 draw, and the following year they overcame Adelaide City 2–1. Both matches were played in Brisbane. City's third NSL season saw a much improved 4th-place finish which saw them qualify for the Top Four round robin series where they reached the Grand Final, losing to Sydney City 2–1 on aggregate.

1980 saw a reversal in fortunes with only four league wins recorded, but 1981 saw a battle for the NSL title, eventually finishing third, 8 points behind Champions Sydney City, with striker Paul Wilkinson weighing in with 12 goals. In those days the NSL compelled clubs to change any ethnic titles in their name, and as such City were occasionally referred to as Brisbane Gladiators around this time.

The following two seasons were a struggle, bottom of the table in 1982 was followed by third bottom in 1983, with city rivals Brisbane Lions bottom. It was tough times for NSL football in the city. For the following three seasons the NSL was increased in size but divided into two Conferences, with City finding themselves in the Southern Division alongside the Melbourne and Adelaide clubs. Fortunes didn't improve however and in 1987 with a return to a single division NSL and a reduction in clubs, City were relegated along with Brisbane Lions to the Brisbane Premier League bringing to an end ten successive seasons at national level.

The last NSL match at Spencer Park took place on 8 September 1986, a 0–0 draw with Sunshine George Cross in front of only 838 fans

NSL Statistics by Season

Season	Pld	W	D	L	GF	GA	Pts	Table Position
1977	26	8	6	12	30	35	22	10th of 14
1978	26	7	3	16	29	49	17	14th of 14
1979	26	14	5	7	38	30	34	4th of 14
1980	26	4	10	12	29	36	18	12th of 14
1981	30	12	11	7	37	25	35	3rd of 16
1982	30	5	11	14	32	55	21	16th of 16
1983	30	8	9	13	33	50	33	14th of 16
1984	28	8	5	15	21	39	21	11th of 12 (Sth)
1985	22	6	5	11	25	42	17	11th of 12 (Sth)
1986	22	3	7	12	18	46	13	11th of 12 (Sth)

(Pld)=Games Played, (W)=Wins, (D)=Draws, (L)=Losses, (GF)=Goals For, (GA)=Goals Against, (Pts)=Points, (Sth)=Southern Conference

== Players ==
=== First-team squad ===
As of 5 January 2023

Note: Flags indicate national team as defined under FIFA eligibility rules; some limited exceptions apply. Players may hold more than one non-FIFA nationality.

No.	Pos.	Nation	Player
1	GK	AUS	Duro Dragicevic
3	DF	NZL	Jackson Simpkin
4	DF	AUS	Daniel Bowles
5	DF	AUS	Matthew Jones
6	MF	AUS	Scott Halliday
7	MF	AUS	Fraser Hills
8	FW	AUS	Roman Hofmann
9	FW	AUS	Brandon Reeves
10	MF	AUS	Sam Sibatuara
12	DF	BRA	Aaron Midon
15	MF	AUS	Kye Bolton

No.	Pos.	Nation	Player
17	FW	AUS	Emad Ali-Sheme
18	MF	JPN	Koji Kato
20	GK	AUS	Riley Stent
21	MF	AUS	Lachlan Sayers
22	MF	AUS	Jesse Rigby (Captain)
—	DF	AUS	Nathan Beagley
—	DF	AUS	Tyson Martin
—	FW	AUS	Daniel Fabrizio
—	MF	AUS	Kai Fiechtner
—	MF	AUS	Jack Daly
—	MF	AUS	Kieran Rocks

== Notable former players ==
- List of former players who played professionally or have represented their nation at senior level.

Australia

- (Australia) Mark Brusasco
- (Australia) Isaka Cernak
- (Australia) Kenny Dougall
- (Australia) John Coyne
- (Australia) Griffin McMaster
- (Australia) Adam Sarota
- (Australia) Michael Zullo

England

- (England) Antonio Murray

Northern Ireland

- (Northern Ireland) Bobby Campbell

Scotland

- (Scotland) Jim Hermiston
- (Scotland) John McVeigh
- (Scotland) Billy Wilkinson

South Sudan

- (South Sudan) Denis Yongule

Papua New Guinea

- (Papua New Guinea) Alex Davani
- (Papua New Guinea) Nathaniel Lepani

Malaysia

- (Malaysia) Curran Singh Ferns
- (Malaysia) David Rowley

== See also ==
- National Premier Leagues Queensland
- List of soccer clubs in Australia
- List of sports clubs inspired by others
