= 1978 South Melbourne FC season =

South Melbourne
1978 season
- Head Coach: David Maclaren; Ted Smith
- Stadium: Middle Park Soccer Stadium
- National Soccer League: 3rd
- NSL Cup: Second round
- Top goalscorer: League: Duncan Cummings (9); All: Duncan Cummings (10)
- Highest home attendance: 18,000 vs. Fitzroy United (2 April 1978); National Soccer League
- Lowest home attendance: 3,500 vs. Canberra City (27 May 1978); National Soccer League
- Average home league attendance: 7,383
- Biggest win: 5–0 vs. Adelaide City (H) (13 August 1978); National Soccer League
- Biggest defeat: 0–3 (twice); 1–4 (once)

The 1978 season was the second in the National Soccer League for South Melbourne Football Club. In addition to the domestic league, they also participated in the NSL Cup.

== Players ==
Note: Flags indicate national team as defined under FIFA eligibility rules; some limited exceptions apply. Players may hold more than one non-FIFA nationality.

No.	Pos.	Nation	Player
1	GK	AUS	John Hansen
2	DF	ENG	Mike Pye
3	DF	AUS	Kris Kalifatidis
4	MF	ENG	Stuart Baxter
5		GRE	Margaritis Hagegmanouil
6	DF	AUS	Bertie Lutton
7		NIR	Sammy Wright
8	MF	AUS	Billy Rogers
9	FW	AUS	Duncan Cummings
10	FW	AUS	Peter Ollerton
11	DF	SCO	Frank Munro

No.	Pos.	Nation	Player
12	MF	AUS	Socrates Nicolaides
13	FW	SCO	Bobby McGuinness
14	MF	AUS	George Christopoulos
15	FW	AUS	Steve Kakantonis
16	FW	SCO	George Campbell
17	DF	AUS	Kyri Kyriakouleas
20	GK	AUS	Jack Reilly
—		AUS	Billy Bergman
—	FW	ENG	Alun Evans
—	MF	AUS	Chris Kent
—		AUS	Peter Vaughan

== Competitions ==
=== Overall record ===
Competition	First match	Last match	Starting round	Final position	Record							
Competition	First match	Last match	Starting round	Final position	Pld	W	D	L	GF	GA	GD	Win %
National Soccer League	5 March 1978	26 August 1978	Matchday 1	3rd	26	12	8	6	45	30	+15	46.15
NSL Cup	31 May 1978	2 August 1978	First round	Second round	2	1	0	1	3	3	+0	50.00
Total					28	13	8	7	48	33	+15	46.43

Source: Competitions

=== National Soccer League ===
==== League table ====
Pos	Team	Pld	W	D	L	GF	GA	GD	Pts	Qualification
1	West Adelaide (C)	26	16	4	6	42	27	+15	36	Qualification to Finals series (Note: The Finals series was not considered the championship for the 1978 National Soccer League.)
2	Eastern Suburbs	26	15	5	6	49	27	+22	35	Qualification to Finals series
3	South Melbourne	26	12	8	6	45	30	+15	32	Qualification to Finals series
4	Marconi Fairfield	26	12	6	8	46	31	+15	30	Qualification to Finals series
5	Fitzroy United	26	9	8	9	39	39	0	26	

Source: rsssf.com
Rules for classification: 1) Points; 2) Goal difference; 3) Goals scored
(C) Champions

==== Results summary ====
Overall								Home						Away					
Pld	W	D	L	GF	GA	GD	Pts	W	D	L	GF	GA	GD	W	D	L	GF	GA	GD
26	12	8	6	45	30	+15	44	7	3	3	26	12	+14	5	5	3	19	18	+1

Source: worldfootball.net

==== Results by round ====
Round	1	2	3	4	5	6	7	8	9	10	11	12	13	14	15	16	17	18	19	20	21	22	23	24	25	26
Ground	A	H	H	A	H	A	H	H	A	H	A	A	H	A	H	A	H	A	H	A	A	H	A	H	H	A
Result	W	D	W	D	D	W	L	L	D	W	D	L	D	W	W	D	W	L	W	W	D	W	L	W	L	W
Position	3	2	2	2	3	2	2	3	3	2	2	4	5	4	4	4	3	5	4	4	4	2	4	3	4	3
Points	2	3	5	6	7	9	9	9	10	12	13	13	14	16	18	19	21	21	23	25	26	28	28	30	30	32

Source: worldfootball.net
A = Away; H = Home; W = Win; D = Draw; L = Loss

==== Matches ====
Win Draw Loss

5 March 1978 1	St George-Budapest	0–2	South Melbourne	Sydney
		Report	Cummings 20'; Rogers 50'	Stadium: St George Stadium; Attendance: 3,853; Referee: Tony Boskovic

12 March 1978 2	South Melbourne	1–1	Sydney Olympic	Melbourne
	Rogers 63'	Report	Ainslie 78'	Stadium: Middle Park Soccer Stadium; Attendance: 4,500; Referee: Chris Bambridge

19 March 1978 3	South Melbourne	3–0	Newcastle KB United	Melbourne
	Ollerton 15', 74'; Hagegmanouil 76'	Report		Stadium: Middle Park Soccer Stadium; Attendance: 5,000; Referee: Jim Dixon

26 March 1978 4	Brisbane Lions	1–1	South Melbourne	Brisbane
	Neale 43'	Report	Wright 74'	Stadium: Perry Park; Attendance: 330; Referee: Dieter Klose

2 April 1978 5	South Melbourne	1–1	Fitzroy United	Melbourne
	Kent 45'	Report	Cole 53'	Stadium: Middle Park Soccer Stadium; Attendance: 18,000; Referee: Nick Karlich

9 April 1978 6	Footscray JUST	0–2	South Melbourne	Melbourne
		Report	Ollerton 45', 78'	Stadium: Olympic Park; Attendance: 8,250; Referee: Bob Henderson

16 April 1978 7	South Melbourne	0–1	Brisbane City	Melbourne
		Report	Echeverria 80'	Stadium: Middle Park Soccer Stadium; Attendance: 5,750; Referee: Jack Readshaw

23 April 1978 8	South Melbourne	0–3	Marconi Fairfield	Melbourne
		Report	Sharne 44'; Vieri 67' (pen.); Jankovics 89'	Stadium: Middle Park Soccer Stadium; Attendance: 17,728; Referee: Stewart Mellings

30 April 1978 9	Eastern Suburbs	0–0	South Melbourne	Sydney
		Report		Stadium: Wentworth Park; Attendance: 3,580; Referee: Tony Boskovic

6 May 1978 10	South Melbourne	2–1	Western Suburbs	Melbourne
	Ollerton 6', 24'	Report	Vernon 2'	Stadium: Middle Park Soccer Stadium; Attendance: 4,000; Referee: Jim Dixon

14 May 1978 11	Adelaide City	1–1	South Melbourne	Adelaide
	Muir 60'	Report	Christopoulos 16'	Stadium: Olympic Sports Field; Attendance: 7,856; Referee: Jim Johnston

21 May 1978 12	West Adelaide	3–1	South Melbourne	Adelaide
	Kambas 42' (pen.); Honeyman 76'; Tymczyszyn 87'	Report	Ollerton 30'	Stadium: Hindmarsh Stadium; Attendance: 10,000; Referee: Dennis Stanley

27 May 1978 13	South Melbourne	0–0	Canberra City	Melbourne
		Report		Stadium: Middle Park Soccer Stadium; Attendance: 3,500; Referee: Tony Beazleigh

4 June 1978 14	Sydney Olympic	1–2	South Melbourne	Sydney
	Davourlis 45'	Report	Campbell 5'; Cummings 39'	Stadium: Erskineville Oval; Referee: Barry Wilkinson

10 June 1978 15	South Melbourne	5–2	St George-Budapest	Melbourne
	Hagegmanouil ?'; Cummings ?'; O'Connor ?'; Rogers ?'; Christopoulos ?'	Report	Morgan ?'; Hensman ?'	Stadium: Middle Park Soccer Stadium; Attendance: 4,000; Referee: Jack Readshaw

17 June 1978 16	Newcastle KB United	1–1	South Melbourne	Newcastle
14:30 AEST	Summerscales 72'	Report	Cummings 63'	Stadium: Newcastle International Sports Centre; Attendance: 7,357; Referee: Tim Davies

25 June 1978 17	South Melbourne	2–1	Brisbane Lions	Melbourne
	Christopoulos 30'; Campbell 40'	Report	Fairbrother ?'	Stadium: Middle Park Soccer Stadium; Attendance: 5,000

2 July 1978 18	Fitzroy United	4–1	South Melbourne	Melbourne
	Campbell 23'; Buljevic 57', 62'; McMillan 86'	Report	Rogers 6'	Stadium: Olympic Park; Attendance: 10,000

9 July 1978 19	South Melbourne	4–0	Footscray JUST	Melbourne
	Campbell 2'; Cummings 45'; Evans 61'; Christopoulos 84'	Report		Stadium: Middle Park Soccer Stadium; Attendance: 4,500; Referee: Tony Beazleigh

16 July 1978 20	Brisbane City	3–4	South Melbourne	Brisbane
	Marley 22'; Kelso 27'; Perry 90'	Report	Cummings 10'; Christopoulos 37'; Campbell 47'; Evans 71'	Stadium: Perry Park; Attendance: 3,000; Referee: Henry Witschge

23 July 1978 21	Marconi Fairfield	1–1	South Melbourne	Sydney
	Vieri 29' (pen.)	Report	Evans 10'	Stadium: Marconi Oval; Attendance: 5,813; Referee: Bill Jones

29 July 1978 22	South Melbourne	3–0	Eastern Suburbs	Melbourne
	Evans 25'; Hagegmanouil 85' (pen.); Thomson 89' (o.g.)	Report		Stadium: Middle Park Soccer Stadium; Attendance: 7,000; Referee: Don Campbell

6 August 1979 23	Western Suburbs	3–0	South Melbourne	Sydney
	Eaton 4', 36', 60'	Report		Stadium: Wentworth Park; Attendance: 4,102; Referee: Tony Boskovic

13 August 1978 24	South Melbourne	5–0	Adelaide City	Melbourne
	Evans 35', 86'; Baxter 62'; Kalafatidis 78'; Cummings 85'	Report		Stadium: Middle Park Soccer Stadium; Attendance: 5,000; Referee: Nick Karlich

20 August 1978 25	South Melbourne	0–2	West Adelaide	Melbourne
		Report	McGregor 15'; Jones 50'	Stadium: Middle Park Soccer Stadium; Attendance: 12,000; Referee: Tim Davies

26 August 1978 26	Canberra City	0–3	South Melbourne	Canberra
15:00 AEST		Report	Lutton 2'; Cummings 58', 75'	Stadium: Bruce Stadium; Attendance: 4,200; Referee: Tony Boskovic

==== Finals series ====
The Finals series was not considered the championship for the 1978 National Soccer League.

3 September 1978 Semi-finals	South Melbourne	2–3	Marconi Fairfield	Melbourne
	Cummings 41'; Evans 55'	Report	Jones 1'; Sharne 8'; Ollerton 44'	Stadium: Middle Park Soccer Stadium; Attendance: 6,200; Referee: Graham Neal

=== NSL Cup ===
Win Draw Loss

31 May 1978 First round	Footscray JUST	1–2	South Melbourne	Melbourne
	Ristovski ?'	Report	Rogers 27'; Lutton 57'	Stadium: Olympic Park; Attendance: 3,000

2 August 1978 Second round	Fitzroy United	2–1 (a.e.t.)	South Melbourne	Melbourne
	Buljevic 88'; Taylor 110'	Report	Cummigs 89'	Stadium: Olympic Park; Attendance: 8,000; Referee: Chris Bambridge

== Statistics ==
=== Appearances and goals ===
Includes all competitions. Players with no appearances not included in the list.

No.	Pos.	Nat.	Player	National Soccer League		NSL Cup		Total	
No.	Pos.	Nat.	Player	Apps	Goals	Apps	Goals	Apps	Goals
1	GK	(Australia)	John Hansen	16	0	1	0	17	0
2	DF	(England)	Mike Pye	25+1	0	2	0	28	0
3	DF	(Australia)	Kris Kalifatidis	23	1	1	0	24	1
4	MF	(England)	Stuart Baxter	25	1	2	0	27	1
5	—	(Greece)	Margaritis Hagegmanouil	26	3	2	0	28	3
6	DF	(Australia)	Bertie Lutton	21+1	1	2	1	24	2
7	—	(Northern Ireland)	Sammy Wright	24	1	2	0	26	1
8	MF	(Australia)	Billy Rogers	25+1	4	1+1	1	28	5
9	FW	(Australia)	Duncan Cummings	21+1	9	2	1	24	10
10	FW	(Australia)	Peter Ollerton	12	7	0	0	12	7
11	DF	(Scotland)	Frank Munro	5	0	1	0	6	0
12	MF	(Australia)	Socrates Nicolaides	1+1	0	0	0	2	0
13	FW	(Scotland)	Bobby McGuinness	3+4	0	0+1	0	8	0
14	MF	(Australia)	George Christopoulos	11+3	5	2	0	16	5
15	FW	(Australia)	Steve Kakantonis	1+1	0	0	0	2	0
16	FW	(Scotland)	George Campbell	14	4	2	0	16	4
17	DF	(Australia)	Kyri Kyriakouleas	1+1	0	0	0	2	0
20	GK	(Australia)	Jack Reilly	10	0	1	0	11	0
—	—	(Australia)	Billy Bergman	1	0	0	0	1	0
—	FW	(England)	Alun Evans	7	6	1	0	8	6
—	MF	(Australia)	Chris Kent	13	1	0	0	13	1
—	—	(Australia)	Peter Vaughan	1	0	0	0	1	0

=== Disciplinary record ===
Includes all competitions. The list is sorted by squad number when total cards are equal. Players with no cards not included in the list.

Rank	No.	Pos.	Nat.	Player	National Soccer League			NSL Cup			Total		
Rank	No.	Pos.	Nat.	Player	Yellow card	Second yellow card	Red card	Yellow card	Second yellow card	Red card	Yellow card	Second yellow card	Red card
1	11	DF	(Scotland)	Frank Munro	1	0	1	0	0	0	1	0	1
2	2	DF	(Australia)	Mike Pye	1	0	0	0	0	0	1	0	0
2	6	DF	(Australia)	Bertie Lutton	1	0	0	0	0	0	1	0	0
2	7	—	(Northern Ireland)	Sammy Wright	1	0	0	0	0	0	1	0	0
2	9	FW	(Australia)	Duncan Cummings	1	0	0	0	0	0	1	0	0
2	—	FW	(England)	Alun Evans	0	0	0	1	0	0	1	0	0
Total					5	0	1	1	0	0	6	0	1

=== Clean sheets ===
Includes all competitions. The list is sorted by squad number when total clean sheets are equal. Numbers in parentheses represent games where both goalkeepers participated and both kept a clean sheet; the number in parentheses is awarded to the goalkeeper who was substituted on, whilst a full clean sheet is awarded to the goalkeeper who was on the field at the start of play. Goalkeepers with no clean sheets not included in the list.

Rank	No.	Nat.	Goalkeeper	NSL	NSL Cup	Total
1	1	(Australia)	John Hansen	5	0	5
2	20	(Australia)	Jack Reilly	4	0	4
Total				9	0	9
