= 1977 Fitzroy United FC season =

Fitzroy United
1977 season
- Manager: Jim Adam; Tony Boggi; John Margaritis
- Stadium: Olympic Park
- National Soccer League: 3rd
- NSL Cup: Semi-finals
- Top goalscorer: League: Gary Cole (11); All: Gary Cole (14)
- Highest home attendance: 13,000 vs. South Melbourne (3 July 1977); National Soccer League
- Lowest home attendance: 1,500 vs. Mooroolbark (16 April 1977); National Soccer League
- Average home league attendance: 5,409
- Biggest win: 4–1 vs. Brisbane Lions (H) (1 May 1977); National Soccer League; 5–2 vs. South Melbourne (H) (3 July 1977); National Soccer League; 3–0 vs. Mooroolbark (H) (2 October 1977); NSL Cup
- Biggest defeat: 1–8 vs. Marconi Fairfield (H) (18 June 1977); National Soccer League
Home colours

The 1977 season was the first in the National Soccer League for Fitzroy United (now Heidelberg United Football Club). In addition to the domestic league, they also participated in the inaugural NSL Cup.

== Players ==
Note: Flags indicate national team as defined under FIFA eligibility rules; some limited exceptions apply. Players may hold more than one non-FIFA nationality.

No.	Pos.	Nation	Player
—	DF	SCO	Pat Bannon
—	DF	SCO	Vince Bannon
—	GK	AUS	Peter Blasby
—	MF	AUS	Andy Bozikas
—	FW	AUS	Branko Buljevic
—	MF	AUS	Jim Campbell
—	FW	AUS	Gary Cole
—	FW	SCO	George Gillan
—		AUS	Mike Glykokalamos
—	FW	GRE	Ulysses Kokkinos
—	DF	SCO	Arthur McMillan

No.	Pos.	Nation	Player
—		AUS	Jim McMorran
—		AUS	Alex Nelson
—	DF	SCO	Jim O'Reilly
—	DF	SCO	Bob Provan
—	DF	AUS	Nick Rakovalis
—	MF	AUS	Theo Selemidis
—	DF	AUS	Jim Tansey
—	MF	AUS	Ken Taylor
—	FW	SCO	Joe Tront
—	GK	SCO	Bill Whiteside

== Transfers ==
=== Transfers in ===
Date from	Position	Name	From	Fee	Ref.
22–23 January 1977	DF	Jim Tansey	(Australia) Slavia Melbourne	$2,000	
22–23 January 1977	DF	(Scotland) Jim O'Reilly	(Australia) Slavia Melbourne	$5,000	

=== Transfers out ===
Date from	Position	Name	To	Fee	Ref.
22–23 January 1977	GK	Jack Reilly	South Melbourne	$3,500	
22–23 January 1977	MF	(Scotland) Ian Gibson	South Melbourne	$3,500	

== Competitions ==
=== Overall record ===
Competition	First match	Last match	Starting round	Final position	Record							
Competition	First match	Last match	Starting round	Final position	Pld	W	D	L	GF	GA	GD	Win %
National Soccer League	3 April 1977	24 September 1977	Matchday 1	3rd	26	12	8	6	41	34	+7	46.15
NSL Cup	22 September 1977	6 October 1977	First round	Semi-finals	3	2	0	1	6	3	+3	66.67
Total					29	14	8	7	47	37	+10	48.28

Source: Competitions

=== National Soccer League ===
==== League table ====
Pos	Team	Pld	W	D	L	GF	GA	GD	Pts
1	Eastern Suburbs (C)	26	13	11	2	52	28	+24	37
2	Marconi Fairfield	26	15	7	4	42	21	+21	37
3	Fitzroy United	26	12	8	6	41	34	+7	32
4	Adelaide City	26	12	7	7	50	31	+19	31
5	Western Suburbs	26	11	7	8	38	29	+9	29

Source: rsssf.com
Rules for classification: 1) Points; 2) Goal difference; 3) Goals scored
(C) Champions

==== Results summary ====
Overall								Home						Away					
Pld	W	D	L	GF	GA	GD	Pts	W	D	L	GF	GA	GD	W	D	L	GF	GA	GD
26	12	8	6	41	34	+7	44	8	2	3	26	20	+6	4	6	3	15	14	+1

Source: worldfootball.net

==== Results by round ====
Round	1	2	3	4	5	6	7	8	9	10	11	12	13	14	15	16	17	18	19	21	22	20	23	24	25	26
Ground	H	A	H	A	H	A	H	A	A	H	A	H	A	H	A	H	A	A	H	H	H	A	A	H	A	H
Result	L	D	W	D	W	W	D	L	L	W	D	L	D	W	D	D	W	L	W	W	W	W	W	W	D	L
Position	11	11	7	7	5	5	4	7	7	6	6	9	9	7	8	8	6	7	6	5	4	3	3	3	3	3
Points	0	1	3	4	6	8	9	9	9	11	12	12	13	15	16	17	19	19	21	23	25	27	29	31	32	32

Source: worldfootball.net
A = Away; H = Home; W = Win; D = Draw; L = Loss

==== Matches ====
Win Draw Loss

3 April 1977 1	Fitzroy United	1–3	Eastern Suburbs	Melbourne
	Taylor 89' (pen.)	Report	Mowbray 65'; Lutton 70'; Smith 75'	Stadium: Olympic Park; Attendance: 7,460; Referee: Jim Dixon

11 April 1977 2	South Melbourne	1–1	Fitzroy United	Melbourne
	Cummings 57'	Report	Provan 88'	Stadium: Middle Park Soccer Stadium; Attendance: 9,000; Referee: Chris Bambridge

16 April 1977 3	Fitzroy United	2–0	Mooroolbark	Melbourne
	Gillan 34'; Cole 52'	Report		Stadium: Middle Park Soccer Stadium; Attendance: 1,500; Referee: Tony Beazleigh

24 April 1977 4	West Adelaide	1–1	Fitzroy United	Adelaide
14:30 ACST	McGregor 35'	Report	Gillan 28'	Stadium: Hindmarsh Stadium; Attendance: 6,800; Referee: Don Campbell

1 May 1977 5	Fitzroy United	4–1	Brisbane Lions	Melbourne
	Campbell 52'; Buljevic 56'; Tansey 75'; Taylor 81'	Report	Morris 84'	Stadium: Fitzroy Cricket Ground; Attendance: 4,560; Referee: David Yelland

7 May 1977 6	Canberra City	0–1	Fitzroy United	Canberra
		Report	Buljevic 89'	Stadium: Manuka Oval; Attendance: 2,000; Referee: Harold Hall

14 May 1977 7	Fitzroy United	2–2	Western Suburbs	Melbourne
	Buljevic 9'; Cole 59'	Report	Lowrey 75'; Norris 81'	Stadium: Middle Park Soccer Stadium; Attendance: 5,800; Referee: Jim Dixon

22 May 1977 8	Sydney Olympic	3–1	Fitzroy United	Sydney
	Pirie 54', 81'; McIntosh 65'	Report	Buljevic 50'	Stadium: Wentworth Park; Attendance: 5,857; Referee: John Van Der Lende

29 May 1977 9	Adelaide City	1–0	Fitzroy United	Adelaide
	Nyskohus 66'	Report		Stadium: Olympic Sports Field; Attendance: 7,500; Referee: Graham Neal

4 June 1977 10	Fitzroy United	2–0	Footscray JUST	Melbourne
	Campbell 15'; Kriaris 30' (o.g.)	Report		Stadium: Middle Park Soccer Stadium; Attendance: 5,500; Referee: Chris Bambridge

12 June 1977 11	Brisbane City	1–1	Fitzroy United	Brisbane
	Pimblett 86'	Report	Cole 20'	Stadium: Perry Park; Attendance: 4,723; Referee: Jack Wood

18 June 1977 12	Fitzroy United	1–8	Marconi Fairfield	Melbourne
	Ken Taylor 84' (o.g.)	Report	Campbell 8', 65', 81'; Sharne 16', 72'; Degney 31'; Rooney 37'; Vieri 62'	Stadium: Middle Park Soccer Stadium; Attendance: 7,800; Referee: Graham Neal

26 June 1977 13	St George-Budapest	2–2	Fitzroy United	Sydney
15:00 AEST	Coton 53'; Jankovics 77'	Report	Buljevic 56'; Campbell 57'	Stadium: Hurstville Oval; Attendance: 2,357; Referee: Brian Fowler

3 July 1977 14	Fitzroy United	5–2	South Melbourne	Melbourne
	Buljevic 13', 45'; Cole 17', 65'; Rogers 28' (o.g.)	Report	Barnes 28', 38'	Stadium: Olympic Park; Attendance: 13,000; Referee: David Yelland

10 July 1977 15	Eastern Suburbs	1–1	Fitzroy United	Sydney
	Kershaw 52'	Report	Cole 90'	Stadium: Wentworth Park; Attendance: 5,334; Referee: Richard Lorenc

17 July 1977 16	Fitzroy United	0–0	West Adelaide	Melbourne
		Report		Stadium: Middle Park Soccer Stadium; Attendance: 7,500; Referee: Bob Henderson

24 July 1977 17	Mooroolbark	1–2	Fitzroy United	Melbourne
	Rigby 80'	Report	Campbell 67'; Bozikas 82'	Stadium: Esther Park; Attendance: 1,255; Referee: Stewart Mellings

31 July 1977 18	Brisbane Lions	2–1	Fitzroy United	Brisbane
	Neale 5'; Fagan 87'	Report	Cole 63'	Stadium: Perry Park; Attendance: 4,501; Referee: Dieter Klose

7 August 1977 19	Fitzroy United	2–0	Canberra City	Melbourne
	Campbell 4'; Cole 7'	Report		Stadium: Olympic Park; Attendance: 2,500; Referee: Chris Bambridge

21 August 1977 21	Fitzroy United	2–0	Sydney Olympic	Melbourne
	Taylor ?' (pen.); Cole ?'	Report		Stadium: Olympic Park; Attendance: 3,000

28 August 1977 22	Fitzroy United	1–0	Adelaide City	Melbourne
	Buljevic 82'	Report		Stadium: Olympic Park; Attendance: 5,500; Referee: Nick Karlich

31 August 1977 20	Western Suburbs	0–1	Fitzroy United	Sydney
		Report	Buljevic 61'	Stadium: Englefield Stadium; Attendance: 1,109; Referee: Peter Rampley

4 September 1977 23	Footscray JUST	1–3	Fitzroy United	Melbourne
	Vasic 12'	Report	Bozikas 25'; Campbell 65'; P. Bannon 83'	Stadium: Olympic Park; Attendance: 6,500; Referee: Don Campbell

11 September 1977 24	Fitzroy United	3–2	Brisbane City	Melbourne
	P. Bannon 58'; Cole 62', 66'	Report	Johnston 73'; Cole 78' (o.g.)	Stadium: Middle Park; Attendance: 4,200; Referee: Dennis Stanley

18 September 1977 25	Marconi Fairfield	0–0	Fitzroy United	Sydney
		Report		Stadium: Marconi Oval; Attendance: 6,500; Referee: Brian Fowler

24 September 1977 26	Fitzroy United	1–2	St George-Budapest	Melbourne
	Bozikas 8'	Report	Williams 40'; Morgan 51'	Stadium: Middle Park; Attendance: 2,000; Referee: Tony Beazleigh

=== NSL Cup ===
Win Draw Loss

22 September 1977 First round	Fitzroy United	1–0	Footscray JUST	Melbourne
	Cole 61'	Report		Stadium: Olympic Park; Attendance: 4,000; Referee: Don Campbell

2 October 1977 Quarter-finals	Fitzroy United	3–0	Mooroolbark	Melbourne
	Buljevic 15', 77'; Cole 50'	Report		Stadium: Olympic Park; Attendance: 2,000; Referee: Barry Wilkinson

6 October 1977 Semi-finals	Fitzroy United	2–3	Marconi Fairfield	Melbourne
	Buljevic 10'; Cole 62'	Report	Mariani 26'; Campbell 61'; Sharne 88'	Stadium: Olympic Park; Attendance: 5,000

== Statistics ==
=== Appearances and goals ===
Includes all competitions. Players with no appearances not included in the list.

No.	Pos.	Nat.	Player	National Soccer League		NSL Cup		Total	
No.	Pos.	Nat.	Player	Apps	Goals	Apps	Goals	Apps	Goals
—	DF	(Scotland)	Pat Bannon	26	2	3	0	29	2
—	DF	(Scotland)	Vince Bannon	8+2	0	0	0	10	0
—	GK	(Australia)	Peter Blasby	26	0	3	0	29	0
—	MF	(Australia)	Andy Bozikas	17+6	3	3	0	26	3
—	FW	(Australia)	Branko Buljevic	26	9	3	3	29	12
—	MF	(Australia)	Jim Campbell	18+3	6	3	0	24	6
—	FW	(Australia)	Gary Cole	24+1	11	3	3	28	14
—	FW	(Scotland)	George Gillan	6+1	2	0	0	7	2
—	—	(Australia)	Mike Glykokalamos	13+1	0	0	0	14	0
—	FW	(Greece)	Ulysses Kokkinos	0+3	0	0	0	3	0
—	DF	(Scotland)	Arthur McMillan	21	0	3	0	24	0
—	—	(Australia)	Jim McMorran	5	0	0	0	5	0
—	FW	(Australia)	Alex Nelson	5	0	0	0	5	0
—	DF	(Scotland)	Jim O'Reilly	22+2	0	3	0	27	0
—	DF	(Scotland)	Bob Provan	19+1	1	3	0	23	1
—	DF	(Australia)	Nick Rakovalis	8+4	0	0	0	12	0
—	MF	(Australia)	Theo Selemidis	0+1	0	0	0	1	0
—	DF	(Australia)	Jim Tansey	16+4	1	3	0	23	1
—	DF	(Australia)	Ken Taylor	22+1	4	3	0	26	4
—	FW	(Scotland)	Joe Tront	4+4	0	0+1	0	9	0
—	GK	(Scotland)	Bill Whiteside	0+1	0	0	0	1	0

=== Disciplinary record ===
Includes all competitions. The list is sorted by squad number when total cards are equal. Players with no cards not included in the list.

Rank	No.	Pos.	Nat.	Player	National Soccer League			NSL Cup			Total		
Rank	No.	Pos.	Nat.	Player	Yellow card	Second yellow card	Red card	Yellow card	Second yellow card	Red card	Yellow card	Second yellow card	Red card
1	—	DF	(Scotland)	Bob Provan	0	0	1	0	0	0	0	0	1
2	—	DF	(Scotland)	Pat Bannon	2	0	0	0	0	0	2	0	0
2	—	MF	(Australia)	Jim Campbell	1	0	0	1	0	0	2	0	0
4	—	FW	(Australia)	Branko Buljevic	0	0	0	1	0	0	1	0	0
4	—	DF	(Scotland)	Arthur McMillan	1	0	0	0	0	0	1	0	0
4	—	DF	(Australia)	Ken Taylor	1	0	0	0	0	0	1	0	0
Total					5	0	1	2	0	0	7	0	1

=== Clean sheets ===
Includes all competitions. The list is sorted by squad number when total clean sheets are equal. Numbers in parentheses represent games where both goalkeepers participated and both kept a clean sheet; the number in parentheses is awarded to the goalkeeper who was substituted on, whilst a full clean sheet is awarded to the goalkeeper who was on the field at the start of play. Goalkeepers with no clean sheets not included in the list.

Rank	No.	Nat.	Goalkeeper	NSL	NSL Cup	Total
1	—	(Australia)	Peter Blasby	9	2	11
Total				9	2	11
