= 1980 South Melbourne FC season =

South Melbourne
1980 season
- Head Coach: John Margaritis
- Stadium: Middle Park Soccer Stadium
- National Soccer League: 3rd
- NSL Cup: Second round
- Top goalscorer: League: Branko Buljevic (10); All: Branko Buljevic (10)
- Highest home attendance: 8,565 vs. Heidelberg United (9 March 1980); National Soccer League
- Lowest home attendance: 1,600 vs. St George-Budapest (14 September 1980); National Soccer League
- Average home league attendance: 4,728
- Biggest win: 5–0 vs. Blacktown City (H) (20 July 1980); National Soccer League
- Biggest defeat: 0–3 vs. Footscray JUST (A) (4 May 1980); National Soccer League

The 1980 season was the fourth in the National Soccer League for South Melbourne Football Club. In addition to the domestic league, they also participated in the NSL Cup. South Melbourne finished 3rd in their National Soccer League season, and were eliminated in the second round of the NSL Cup.

== Players ==
Note: Flags indicate national team as defined under FIFA eligibility rules; some limited exceptions apply. Players may hold more than one non-FIFA nationality.

No.	Pos.	Nation	Player
1	GK	AUS	Peter Laumets
2	DF	SCO	Vince Bannon
3	DF	AUS	Alan Davidson
5	DF	AUS	Arthur Xanthopoulos
6	MF	AUS	Billy Rogers
7		NIR	Sammy Wright
8	MF	AUS	George Christopoulos
9	FW	AUS	Steve Kakantonis

No.	Pos.	Nation	Player
10	FW	ENG	Alun Evans
11	FW	AUS	Branko Buljevic
12	DF	AUS	Kris Kalifatidis
14	DF	AUS	Bertie Lutton
15	FW	AUS	Duncan Cummings
16	FW	SCO	George Campbell
18	DF	AUS	Steve Blair

== Competitions ==
=== Overall record ===
Competition	First match	Last match	Starting round	Final position	Record							
Competition	First match	Last match	Starting round	Final position	Pld	W	D	L	GF	GA	GD	Win %
National Soccer League	9 March 1980	28 September 1980	Matchday 1	3rd	26	15	5	6	42	21	+21	57.69
NSL Cup	25 April 1980	23 July 1980	First round	Second round	2	1	0	1	6	3	+3	50.00
Total					28	16	5	7	48	24	+24	57.14

Source: Competitions

=== National Soccer League ===
==== League table ====
Pos	Team	Pld	W	D	L	GF	GA	GD	Pts	Qualification or relegation
1	Sydney City (C)	26	16	5	5	51	26	+25	37	Qualification to Finals series (Note: The Finals series was not considered the championship for the 1980 National Soccer League.)
2	Heidelberg United	26	15	6	5	55	33	+22	36	Qualification to Finals series
3	South Melbourne	26	15	5	6	42	21	+21	35	Qualification to Finals series
4	Marconi Fairfield	26	14	6	6	53	32	+21	34	Qualification to Finals series
5	Adelaide City	26	13	4	9	40	27	+13	30	
6	Newcastle KB United	26	12	6	8	32	31	+1	30	
7	Brisbane Lions	26	7	11	8	28	32	−4	25	
8	APIA Leichhardt	26	8	7	11	27	35	−8	23	
9	Footscray JUST	26	7	9	10	32	41	−9	23	
10	Canberra City	26	7	7	12	34	33	+1	21	
11	Blacktown City	26	9	3	14	34	55	−21	21	
12	Brisbane City	26	4	10	12	29	36	−7	18	
13	West Adelaide	26	7	3	16	24	46	−22	17	
14	St George-Budapest (R)	26	5	4	17	32	65	−33	14	Relegated to the 1981 NSW State League

Updated to match(es) played on unknown. Source: rsssf.com
Rules for classification: 1) points; 2) goal difference; 3) number of goals scored.
(C) Champions; (R) Relegated

==== Results summary ====
Overall								Home						Away					
Pld	W	D	L	GF	GA	GD	Pts	W	D	L	GF	GA	GD	W	D	L	GF	GA	GD
26	15	5	6	42	21	+21	50	8	4	1	25	10	+15	7	1	5	17	11	+6

Source: worldfootball.net

==== Results by round ====
Round	1	2	3	4	5	6	7	8	9	10	11	12	14	16	15	17	18	19	13	20	21	22	23	24	25	26
Ground	H	A	A	H	A	H	A	H	A	H	A	H	H	A	A	H	H	A	A	H	A	H	A	H	A	H
Result	D	W	L	L	W	W	W	W	L	W	W	W	D	L	W	W	W	L	L	D	D	W	W	W	W	D
Position	9	3	8	10	6	5	4	4	5	5	4	3	4	4	3	3	4	4	4	4	4	4	4	4	3	3
Points	1	3	3	3	5	7	9	11	11	13	15	17	18	18	20	22	24	24	24	25	26	28	30	32	34	35

Source: worldfootball.net
A = Away; H = Home; W = Win; D = Draw; L = Loss

==== Matches ====
Win Draw Loss

9 March 1980 1	South Melbourne	0–0	Heidelberg United	Melbourne
		Report		Stadium: Middle Park Soccer Stadium; Attendance: 8,565; Referee: Stewart Mellings

16 March 1980 2	Brisbane Lions	1–2	South Melbourne	Brisbane
	Reid 50'	Report	Campbell 3'; Rogers 67'	Stadium: Lions Stadium; Attendance: 2,000; Referee: Dave Nugent

23 March 1980 3	West Adelaide	1–0	South Melbourne	Adelaide
	Koulianos 68'	Report		Stadium: Hindmarsh Stadium; Attendance: 4,200; Referee: Tim Davies

30 March 1980 4	South Melbourne	1–2	Sydney City	Melbourne
	Buljevic 85'	Report	Boden 30', 52'	Stadium: Middle Park Soccer Stadium; Attendance: 5,000; Referee: Chris Bambridge

6 April 1980 5	Blacktown City	0–3	South Melbourne	Sydney
15:00 AEST		Report	Rogers 12'; Buljevic 59'; Campbell 60'	Stadium: Gabbie Stadium; Attendance: 3,250; Referee: Henry Witschge

13 April 1980 6	South Melbourne	1–0	APIA Leichhardt	Melbourne
	Christopoulos 23'	Report		Stadium: Middle Park Soccer Stadium; Attendance: 3,500; Referee: Don Campbell

20 April 1980 7	Brisbane City	0–1	South Melbourne	Brisbane
		Report	Cummings 72'	Stadium: Perry Park; Attendance: 2,634; Referee: Richard Lorenc

27 April 1980 8	South Melbourne	1–0	Canberra City	Melbourne
15:00 AEST	Christopoulos 3' (pen.)	Report		Stadium: Middle Park Soccer Stadium; Attendance: 3,600; Referee: Evan Venios

4 May 1980 9	Footscray JUST	3–0	South Melbourne	Melbourne
	Petrov 1'; Vasic 10'; Ollerton 84' (pen.)	Report		Stadium: Olympic Park; Attendance: 6,500; Referee: Peter Rampley

11 May 1980 10	South Melbourne	2–1	Adelaide City	Melbourne
	Xanthopoulos 18'; Buljevic 56'	Report	Rogers 50' (o.g.)	Stadium: Middle Park Soccer Stadium; Attendance: 4,400; Referee: Tony Boskovic

18 May 1980 11	St George-Budapest	0–3	South Melbourne	Sydney
		Report	Xanthopoulos 35'; Cummings 64'; Evans 74'	Stadium: Sydney Cricket Ground; Attendance: 6,000; Referee: Richard Lorenc

25 May 1980 12	South Melbourne	3–1	Marconi Fairfield	Melbourne
	Evans 42', 49'; Campbell 60'	Report	Byrne 10'	Stadium: Middle Park Soccer Stadium; Attendance: 8,000; Referee: Jim Brennan

8 June 1980 14	South Melbourne	2–2	Brisbane Lions	Melbourne
	Buljevic 44'; Campbell 57'	Report	Millman 32', 76'	Stadium: Middle Park Soccer Stadium; Attendance: 4,500; Referee: Jack Johnston

22 June 1980 16	Sydney City	2–1	South Melbourne	Sydney
	Boden 24'; Trenter 37'	Report	Christopoulos 75'	Stadium: ES Marks Athletics Field; Attendance: 3,601; Referee: Tony Boskovic

6 July 1980 15	Heidelberg United	1–2	South Melbourne	Melbourne
	Paton 2'	Report	Buljevic 51', 80'	Stadium: Olympic Park; Attendance: 15,000; Referee: Graham Neal

13 July 1980 17	South Melbourne	2–0	West Adelaide	Melbourne
	Buljevic 63', 64'	Report		Stadium: Middle Park Soccer Stadium; Attendance: 5,000; Referee: Peter Rampley

20 July 1980 18	South Melbourne	5–0	Blacktown City	Melbourne
	Buljevic 21', 33'; Campbell 42', 81'; Bannon 66'	Report		Stadium: Middle Park Soccer Stadium; Attendance: 3,000; Referee: Tony Beazleigh

27 July 1980 19	APIA Leichhardt	1–0	South Melbourne	Sydney
	O'Connor 43'	Report		Stadium: Lambert Park; Attendance: 2,341; Referee: Richard Lorenc

3 August 1980 13	Newcastle KB United	1–0	South Melbourne	Newcastle
	Curran 21'	Report		Stadium: Newcastle International Sports Centre; Attendance: 5,412; Referee: Jim Reeves

10 August 1980 20	South Melbourne	3–3	Brisbane City	Melbourne
	Rogers 22'; Bannon 78'; Evans 90'	Report	Conner 57', 80'; Kelso 83'	Stadium: Middle Park Soccer Stadium; Attendance: 4,800; Referee: Evans Venios

17 August 1980 21	Canberra City	0–0	South Melbourne	Canberra
15:00 AEST		Report		Stadium: Bruce Stadium; Attendance: 1,860; Referee: Bob Mee

31 August 1980 22	South Melbourne	3–0	Footscray JUST	Melbourne
	Evans 14', 51'; Wright 34'	Report		Stadium: Middle Park Soccer Stadium; Attendance: 3,500; Referee: Henry Witschge

7 September 1980 23	Adelaide City	0–1	South Melbourne	Adelaide
		Report	Cummings 82'	Stadium: Olympic Sports Field; Attendance: 4,923; Referee: Peter Rampley

14 September 1980 24	South Melbourne	2–1	St George-Budapest	Melbourne
	Kakantonis 17'; Wright 35'	Report	Cotton 78'	Stadium: Middle Park Soccer Stadium; Attendance: 1,600; Referee: Bobby Kerr

21 September 1980 25	Marconi Fairfield	1–4	South Melbourne	Sydney
15:00 AEST	Jankovics 34'	Report	Evans 13', 88'; Cummings 54', 90'	Stadium: Marconi Oval; Attendance: 3,406; Referee: Dave Nugent

28 September 1980 26	South Melbourne	0–0	Newcastle KB United	Melbourne
		Report		Stadium: Middle Park Soccer Stadium; Attendance: 6,000; Referee: Peter Rampley

==== Finals series ====
The Finals series was not considered the championship for the 1980 National Soccer League.

12 October 1980 Elimination semi-final	South Melbourne	4–3	Marconi Fairfield	Melbourne
	Evans 49', 82'; Xanthopoulos 75'; Buljevic 80'	Report	Sharne 10'; Byrne 19' (pen.); Krncevic 41'	Stadium: Middle Park Soccer Stadium; Attendance: 4,500; Referee: Chris Bambridge

18 October 1980 Preliminary Final	Heidelberg United	4–1	South Melbourne	Melbourne
	Paton 5', 85'; Bozikas 26'; Cole 67' (pen.)	Report	Buljevic 9'	Stadium: Olympic Park; Attendance: 7,700; Referee: Tim Davies

=== NSL Cup ===
Win Draw Loss

25 April 1980 First round	South Melbourne	5–1	(Victoria (state)) Frankston City	Melbourne
	Campbell 10', 37'; Christopoulos 35', 65'; Cummings 87'	Report	Wall 75'	Stadium: Middle Park Soccer Stadium; Attendance: 3,000; Referee: Jim Fearn

23 July 1980 Second round	Heidelberg United	2–1	South Melbourne	Melbourne
	Yzendoorn 55'; Cole 76'	Report	Rogers 30'	Stadium: Olympic Park; Attendance: 7,232; Referee: Henry Witschge

== Statistics ==
=== Appearances and goals ===
Includes all competitions. Players with no appearances not included in the list.

No.	Pos.	Nat.	Player	National Soccer League		NSL Cup		Total	
No.	Pos.	Nat.	Player	Apps	Goals	Apps	Goals	Apps	Goals
1	GK	(Australia)	Peter Laumets	26	0	2	0	28	0
2	DF	(Scotland)	Vince Bannon	26	2	2	0	28	2
3	DF	(Australia)	Alan Davidson	17	0	1+1	0	19	0
5	DF	(Australia)	Arthur Xanthopoulos	26	2	2	0	28	2
6	MF	(Australia)	Billy Rogers	24	3	2	1	26	4
7	—	(Northern Ireland)	Sammy Wright	8+2	2	0+1	0	11	2
8	MF	(Australia)	George Christopoulos	20+1	3	2	2	23	5
9	FW	(Australia)	Steve Kakantonis	2+10	1	0+1	0	13	1
10	FW	(England)	Alun Evans	24	8	2	0	26	8
11	FW	(Australia)	Branko Buljevic	25	10	2	0	27	10
12	DF	(Australia)	Kris Kalifatidis	2+10	1	1	0	13	1
14	DF	(Australia)	Bertie Lutton	24	0	2	0	26	0
15	FW	(Australia)	Duncan Cummings	21+3	5	1	1	25	6
16	FW	(Australia)	George Campbell	24	6	2	2	26	8
18	DF	(Australia)	Steve Blair	14+2	0	1	0	17	0

=== Disciplinary record ===
Includes all competitions. The list is sorted by squad number when total cards are equal. Players with no cards not included in the list.

Rank	No.	Pos.	Nat.	Player	National Soccer League			NSL Cup			Total		
Rank	No.	Pos.	Nat.	Player	Yellow card	Second yellow card	Red card	Yellow card	Second yellow card	Red card	Yellow card	Second yellow card	Red card
1	14	DF	(Australia)	Bertie Lutton	1	0	1	1	0	0	2	0	1
2	8	MF	(Australia)	George Christopoulos	3	0	0	0	0	0	3	0	0
3	2	DF	(Scotland)	Vince Bannon	2	0	0	0	0	0	2	0	0
3	10	FW	(England)	Alun Evans	2	0	0	0	0	0	2	0	0
5	3	DF	(Australia)	Alan Davidson	1	0	0	0	0	0	1	0	0
5	5	DF	(Australia)	Arthur Xanthopoulos	1	0	0	0	0	0	1	0	0
5	6	MF	(Australia)	Billy Rogers	1	0	0	0	0	0	1	0	0
5	12	DF	(Australia)	Kris Kalifatidis	1	0	0	0	0	0	1	0	0
5	15	FW	(Australia)	Duncan Cummings	1	0	0	0	0	0	1	0	0
5	16	FW	(Scotland)	George Campbell	1	0	0	0	0	0	1	0	0
5	18	DF	(Australia)	Steve Blair	0	0	0	1	0	0	1	0	0
Total					14	0	1	2	0	0	16	0	1

=== Clean sheets ===
Includes all competitions. The list is sorted by squad number when total clean sheets are equal. Numbers in parentheses represent games where both goalkeepers participated and both kept a clean sheet; the number in parentheses is awarded to the goalkeeper who was substituted on, whilst a full clean sheet is awarded to the goalkeeper who was on the field at the start of play. Goalkeepers with no clean sheets not included in the list.

Rank	No.	Nat.	Goalkeeper	NSL	NSL Cup	Total
1	1	(Australia)	Peter Laumets	12	0	12
Total				12	0	12
