= 1979 South Melbourne FC season =

South Melbourne
1979 season
- Head Coach: David Maclaren; Duncan McKay; John Margaritis
- Stadium: Middle Park Soccer Stadium
- National Soccer League: 14th
- NSL Cup: First round
- Top goalscorer: League: Alun Evans (7); All: Alun Evans (7)
- Highest home attendance: 12,000 vs. APIA Leichhardt (18 June 1979); National Soccer League; 12,000 vs. Heidelberg United (15 July 1979); National Soccer League
- Lowest home attendance: 2,500 vs. Brisbane Lions (22 July 1979); National Soccer League
- Average home league attendance: 5,954
- Biggest win: 4–0 vs. Brisbane City (16 September 1979); National Soccer League
- Biggest defeat: 0–6 vs. Marconi Fairfield (22 April 1979); National Soccer League

The 1979 season was the third in the National Soccer League for South Melbourne Football Club. In addition to the domestic league, they also participated in the NSL Cup. South Melbourne finished 14th in their National Soccer League season, and were eliminated in the first round of the NSL Cup.

== Players ==
Note: Flags indicate national team as defined under FIFA eligibility rules; some limited exceptions apply. Players may hold more than one non-FIFA nationality.

No.	Pos.	Nation	Player
1	GK	AUS	Peter Laumets
2	DF	AUS	Kris Kalifatidis
3	FW	AUS	Mendo Ristovski
4	DF	SCO	Frank Munro
5	MF	ENG	Stuart Baxter
6		NIR	Sammy Wright
8	MF	AUS	George Christopoulos
9	FW	AUS	Duncan Cummings
10	FW	ENG	Alun Evans
11	FW	SCO	George Campbell
12		AUS	Steve Carr

No.	Pos.	Nation	Player
13		AUS	Ken Drakeford
14	DF	AUS	Alan Davidson
15	DF	AUS	Kyri Kyriakouleas
16	DF	ENG	Mike Pye
17	DF	AUS	Peter Scarlett
18	DF	AUS	Bertie Lutton
19	FW	AUS	Steve Kakantonis
20	GK	SCO	Dennis Boland
—	GK	AUS	John Hansen
—	GK	AUS	Jack Reilly
—	DF	ENG	Tony Turner

== Competitions ==
=== Overall record ===
Competition	First match	Last match	Starting round	Final position	Record							
Competition	First match	Last match	Starting round	Final position	Pld	W	D	L	GF	GA	GD	Win %
National Soccer League	11 March 1979	23 September 1979	Matchday 1	14th	26	6	3	17	26	45	−19	23.08
NSL Cup	25 April 1979		First round	First round	1	0	0	1	1	2	−1	0.00
Total					27	6	3	18	27	47	−20	22.22

Source: Competitions

=== National Soccer League ===
==== League table ====
Pos	Team	Pld	W	D	L	GF	GA	GD	Pts	Qualification or relegation
1	Marconi Fairfield (C)	26	15	6	5	58	32	+26	40 (Note: A Bonus Point was awarded for victories of 4 goals or more.)	Qualification to Finals series (Note: The Finals series was not considered the championship for the 1979 National Soccer League.)
2	Heidelberg United	26	14	7	5	44	30	+14	36	Qualification to Finals series
3	Sydney City	26	15	3	8	47	29	+18	34	Qualification to Finals series
4	Brisbane City	26	14	5	7	38	30	+8	34	Qualification to Finals series
5	Adelaide City	26	13	6	7	43	27	+16	33	
6	Newcastle KB United	26	11	9	6	43	30	+13	32	
7	West Adelaide	26	10	4	12	28	31	−3	25	
8	APIA Leichhardt	26	11	3	12	29	37	−8	25	
9	Brisbane Lions	26	8	6	12	28	40	−12	22	
10	Footscray JUST	26	8	3	15	29	43	−14	20	
11	St George-Budapest	26	7	6	13	27	43	−16	20	
12	Canberra City	26	6	8	12	25	41	−16	20	
13	Sydney Olympic (R)	26	7	5	14	23	30	−7	19	Relegated to the 1980 NSW State League
14	South Melbourne	26	6	3	17	26	45	−19	16	

Updated to match(es) played on unknown. Source: rsssf.com
Rules for classification: 1) points; 2) goal difference; 3) number of goals scored.
(C) Champions; (R) Relegated

==== Results summary ====
Overall								Home						Away					
Pld	W	D	L	GF	GA	GD	Pts	W	D	L	GF	GA	GD	W	D	L	GF	GA	GD
26	6	3	17	26	45	−19	21	4	2	7	19	18	+1	2	1	10	7	27	−20

Source: worldfootball.net

==== Results by round ====
Round	1	2	3	4	5	6	7	8	9	10	11	12	13	14	15	16	17	18	19	20	21	22	23	24	25	26
Ground	A	H	A	H	A	H	A	H	A	H	H	A	H	A	H	A	H	H	A	H	A	H	A	A	H	A
Result	L	L	L	D	L	L	L	W	W	W	L	L	L	D	L	L	L	W	L	L	L	D	L	W	W	L
Position	10	12	14	14	14	14	14	13	13	13	13	13	13	13	13	13	14	13	13	14	14	14	14	14	14	14
Points	0	0	0	1	1	1	1	3	5	7	7	7	7	8	8	8	8	10	10	10	10	11	11	13	16	16

Source: worldfootball.net
A = Away; H = Home; W = Win; D = Draw; L = Loss

==== Matches ====
Win Draw Loss

11 March 1979 1	Newcastle KB United	3–0 (Note: Awarded score. Original score 2–1 to Newcastle KB United; result was changed after the Australian Soccer Federation determined that South Melbourne fielded ineligible player Tony Tuner.)	South Melbourne	Newcastle
14:30 AEDT	Curran 16'; Summerscales 57'	Report	Baxter 19'	Stadium: Newcastle International Sports Centre; Attendance: 7,332; Referee: Peter Rampley

18 March 1979 2	South Melbourne	0–3 (Note: Awarded score. Original score 1–0 to South Melbourne; result was changed after the Australian Soccer Federation determined that South Melbourne fielded ineligible player Tony Tuner.)	Sydney Olympic	Melbourne
	Evans 27'	Report		Stadium: Middle Park Soccer Stadium; Attendance: 4,500; Referee: Chris Bambridge

25 March 1979 3	Heidelberg United	3–0 (Note: Awarded score. Original score 2–2; result was changed after the Australian Soccer Federation determined that South Melbourne fielded ineligible player Tony Tuner.)	South Melbourne	Melbourne
	Buljevic 36'; Taylor ?'	Report	Drakeford 62'; Cummings 79'	Stadium: Olympic Park; Attendance: 12,000; Referee: Tony Beazleigh

1 April 1979 4	South Melbourne	1–1	Canberra City	Melbourne
	Cummings 53'	Report	Byrne 35'	Stadium: Middle Park Soccer Stadium; Attendance: 5,200; Referee: Graham Neale

8 April 1979 5	Brisbane Lions	2–0	South Melbourne	Brisbane
	Hughes 67'; Brennan 72'	Report		Stadium: Perry Park; Attendance: 1,500; Referee: Tony Boskovic

15 April 1979 6	South Melbourne	1–2	Sydney City	Melbourne
	Kalifatidis 54'	Report	Smith 22'; Barnes 26'	Stadium: Middle Park Soccer Stadium; Attendance: 8,000; Referee: Jack Johnston

22 April 1979 7	Marconi Fairfield	6–0	South Melbourne	Sydney
15:00 AEST	Degney 7'; Sharne 13', 85'; Jankovics 29', 60', 78'	Report		Stadium: Marconi Oval; Attendance: 4,500; Referee: Tim Davies

29 April 1979 8	South Melbourne	2–0	St George-Budapest	Melbourne
	Christopoulos 66'; Evans 79'	Report		Stadium: Middle Park Soccer Stadium; Attendance: 4,500; Referee: Tony Beazleigh

6 May 1979 9	Footscray JUST	0–2	South Melbourne	Melbourne
15:00 AEST		Report	Lutton 14'; Wright 50'	Stadium: Olympic Park; Attendance: 7,050; Referee: Chris Bambridge

13 May 1979 10	South Melbourne	1–0	Adelaide City	Melbourne
15:00 AEST	Baxter 65'	Report		Stadium: Middle Park Soccer Stadium; Attendance: 4,500; Referee: Tony Boskovic

3 June 1979 11	South Melbourne	3–4	West Adelaide	Melbourne
	Evans 21', 79'; Davidson 83'	Report	Kosmina 14', 88'; Norris 54', 72'	Stadium: Middle Park Soccer Stadium; Attendance: 7,000; Referee: Tim Davies

10 June 1979 12	Brisbane City	1–0	South Melbourne	Brisbane
	Kelso 72'	Report		Stadium: Perry Park; Attendance: 2,450; Referee: Doug Rennie

18 June 1979 13	South Melbourne	1–2	APIA Leichhardt	Melbourne
	Lutton 38'	Report	Butler 22'; Pye 85' (o.g.)	Stadium: Middle Park Soccer Stadium; Attendance: 12,000; Referee: Don Campbell

24 June 1979 14	Sydney Olympic	1–1	South Melbourne	Sydney
	Bell 15'	Report	Davidson 8'	Stadium: Pratten Park; Attendance: 2,572; Referee: Peter Rampley

1 July 1979 15	South Melbourne	1–2	Newcastle KB United	Melbourne
	Christopoulos 52'	Report	Drinkwater 6'; Senkalski 38'	Stadium: Middle Park Soccer Stadium; Attendance: 3,200; Referee: Tony Beazleigh

7 July 1979 16	Canberra City	3–2	South Melbourne	Canberra
	Byrne 14', 59'; Maclaren ?'	Report	Lutton 4'; Evans 49'	Stadium: Bruce Stadium; Attendance: 2,225; Referee: Doug Rennie

15 July 1979 17	South Melbourne	0–1	Heidelberg United	Melbourne
		Report	Taylor 3'	Stadium: Middle Park Soccer Stadium; Attendance: 12,000; Referee: Tim Davies

22 July 1979 18	South Melbourne	3–0	Brisbane Lions	Melbourne
	Campbell 59', 81'; Lutton 88'	Report		Stadium: Middle Park Soccer Stadium; Attendance: 2,500; Referee: Stewart Mellings

29 July 1979 19	Sydney City	2–0	South Melbourne	Sydney
	Mullen 44'; Souness 90+1' (pen.)	Report		Stadium: Wentworth Park; Attendance: 1,027; Referee: Bill Jones

5 August 1979 20	South Melbourne	1–2	Marconi Fairfield	Melbourne
	Ristovski 57'	Report	Henderson 33'; Krncevic 70'	Stadium: Middle Park Soccer Stadium; Attendance: 5,000; Referee: Jack Johnston

18 August 1979 21	St George-Budapest	1–0	South Melbourne	Sydney
	Hensman 81'	Report		Stadium: St George Stadium; Attendance: 2,143; Referee: Tim Davies

26 August 1979 22	South Melbourne	1–1	Footscray JUST	Melbourne
	Kakantonis 82'	Report	Lujic 74'	Stadium: Middle Park Soccer Stadium; Attendance: 4,000; Referee: Jack Johnston

2 September 1979 23	Adelaide City	3–0	South Melbourne	Adelaide
	Kent 50'; Villani 60'; Perin 82'	Report		Stadium: Hindmarsh Stadium; Attendance: 2,000; Referee: Henry Witschge

9 September 1979 24	West Adelaide	0–1	South Melbourne	Adelaide
		Report	Baxter 71' (pen.)	Stadium: Hindmarsh Stadium; Attendance: 3,100; Referee: Richard Lorenc

16 September 1979 25	South Melbourne	4–0	Brisbane City	Melbourne
	Ristovski 63'; Christopoulos 82'; Evans 85', 89'	Report		Stadium: Middle Park Soccer Stadium; Attendance: 5,000; Referee: Stewart Mellings

23 September 1979 26	APIA Leichhardt	2–1	South Melbourne	Sydney
	Drewes 23'; Stone 72'	Report	Ristovski 47'	Stadium: Wentworth Park; Attendance: 850; Referee: Ken Allen

=== NSL Cup ===
Win Draw Loss

25 April 1979 First round	Heidelberg United	2–1	South Melbourne	Melbourne
	Campbell 60', 63'	Report	Christopoulos 15'	Stadium: Olympic Park; Attendance: 6,000; Referee: Graham Neale

== Statistics ==
=== Appearances and goals ===
Includes all competitions. Players with no appearances not included in the list.

No.	Pos.	Nat.	Player	National Soccer League		NSL Cup		Total	
No.	Pos.	Nat.	Player	Apps	Goals	Apps	Goals	Apps	Goals
1	GK	(Australia)	Peter Laumets	11	0	0	0	11	0
2	DF	(Australia)	Kris Kalifatidis	22+1	1	1	0	24	1
3	FW	(Australia)	Mendo Ristovski	7	3	0	0	7	3
4	DF	(Scotland)	Frank Munro	10	0	0	0	10	0
5	MF	(England)	Stuart Baxter	25	3	1	0	26	3
6	—	(Northern Ireland)	Sammy Wright	18+3	1	1	0	22	1
8	MF	(Australia)	George Christopoulos	21+3	3	1	1	25	4
9	FW	(Australia)	Duncan Cummings	12+4	2	0	0	16	2
10	FW	(England)	Alun Evans	25	7	1	0	26	7
11	FW	(Scotland)	George Campbell	24	2	1	0	25	2
12	—	(Australia)	Steve Carr	3+5	0	0	0	8	0
13	—	(Australia)	Ken Drakeford	10+2	1	1	0	13	1
14	DF	(Australia)	Alan Davidson	19+2	2	1	0	22	2
15	DF	(Australia)	Kyri Kyriakouleas	7+1	0	0	0	8	0
16	DF	(England)	Mike Pye	20	0	1	0	21	0
17	DF	(Australia)	Peter Scarlett	1	0	0	0	1	0
18	DF	(Australia)	Bertie Lutton	23+2	4	1	0	26	4
19	FW	(Australia)	Steve Kakantonis	3+1	0	0	0	4	0
20	GK	(Scotland)	Dennis Boland	6	0	0	0	6	0
—	GK	(Australia)	John Hansen	4	0	1	0	5	0
—	GK	(Australia)	Jack Reilly	5	0	0	0	5	0
—	DF	(England)	Tony Turner	10+2	0	0	0	12	0

=== Disciplinary record ===
Includes all competitions. The list is sorted by squad number when total cards are equal. Players with no cards not included in the list.

Rank	No.	Pos.	Nat.	Player	National Soccer League			NSL Cup			Total		
Rank	No.	Pos.	Nat.	Player	Yellow card	Second yellow card	Red card	Yellow card	Second yellow card	Red card	Yellow card	Second yellow card	Red card
1	4	DF	(Scotland)	Frank Munro	1	0	1	0	0	0	1	0	1
2	2	DF	(Australia)	Kris Kalifatidis	7	0	0	0	0	0	7	0	0
2	10	FW	(England)	Alun Evans	7	0	0	0	0	0	7	0	0
4	5	MF	(England)	Stuart Baxter	5	0	0	0	0	0	5	0	0
5	18	DF	(Australia)	Bertie Lutton	3	0	0	1	0	0	4	0	0
6	8	MF	(Australia)	George Christopoulos	2	0	0	0	0	0	2	0	0
7	6	—	(Northern Ireland)	Sammy Wright	0	0	0	1	0	0	1	0	0
7	9	FW	(Australia)	Duncan Cummings	1	0	0	0	0	0	1	0	0
7	13	—	(Australia)	Ken Drakeford	1	0	0	0	0	0	1	0	0
7	14	DF	(Australia)	Alan Davidson	1	0	0	0	0	0	1	0	0
7	15	DF	(Australia)	Kyri Kyriakouleas	1	0	0	0	0	0	1	0	0
7	—	GK	(Australia)	John Hansen	1	0	0	0	0	0	1	0	0
Total					30	0	1	2	0	0	32	0	1

=== Clean sheets ===
Includes all competitions. The list is sorted by squad number when total clean sheets are equal. Numbers in parentheses represent games where both goalkeepers participated and both kept a clean sheet; the number in parentheses is awarded to the goalkeeper who was substituted on, whilst a full clean sheet is awarded to the goalkeeper who was on the field at the start of play. Goalkeepers with no clean sheets not included in the list.

Rank	No.	Nat.	Goalkeeper	NSL	NSL Cup	Total
1	1	(Australia)	Peter Laumets	4	0	4
2	20	(Australia)	Dennis Boland	2	0	2
Total				6	0	6
