= 1977 South Melbourne FC season =

South Melbourne
1977 season
- Head Coach: Manny Poulakakis; Con Xanthopoulos
- Stadium: Middle Park Soccer Stadium
- National Soccer League: 11th
- NSL Cup: First round
- Top goalscorer: League: Peter Ollerton (6); All: Peter Ollerton (6)
- Highest home attendance: 15,000 vs. St George-Budapest (13 June 1977); National Soccer League
- Lowest home attendance: 2,000 vs. Eastern Suburbs (14 August 1977); National Soccer League
- Average home league attendance: 4,823
- Biggest win: 2–0 (4 times); 4–2 (once)
- Biggest defeat: 0–3 vs. Marconi Fairfield (A) (30 April 1977); National Soccer League; 2–5 vs. Fitzroy United (A) (3 July 1977); National Soccer League
Home colours

The 1977 season was the first in the National Soccer League for South Melbourne Football Club. In addition to the domestic league, they also participated in the NSL Cup. South Melbourne finished 11th in their National Soccer League season, and were eliminated in the first round of the NSL Cup. 191f51

== Players ==
Note: Flags indicate national team as defined under FIFA eligibility rules; some limited exceptions apply. Players may hold more than one non-FIFA nationality.

No.	Pos.	Nation	Player
—	MF	AUS	Jim Alexiou
—		AUS	George Bozikis
—	FW	AUS	Duncan Cummings
—	MF	AUS	John Daperis
—	DF	YUG	Anton Dosen
—	FW	AUS	Graham French
—	MF	AUS	John Gardiner
—	MF	AUS	Ian Gibson
—		GRE	Margaritis Hagegmanouil
—	DF	AUS	Kris Kalifatidis
—	MF	AUS	Chris Kent

No.	Pos.	Nation	Player
—		AUS	Reno Lia
—	FW	ENG	Malcolm Macdonald
—	MF	AUS	Jimmy Mackay
—	DF	SCO	Malcolm Manley
—	MF	IRL	Noel Mitten
—	FW	AUS	Peter Ollerton
—	DF	ENG	Mike Pye
—	GK	AUS	Jack Reilly
—	MF	AUS	Billy Rogers
—	GK	GRE	Lou Tsigaris
—	DF	AUS	Arthur Xanthopoulos

== Transfers ==
=== Transfers in ===
Date from	Position	Name	From	Fee	Ref.
22–23 January 1977	GK	Jack Reilly	Fitzroy United	$3,500	
22–23 January 1977	MF	(Scotland) Ian Gibson	Fitzroy United	$3,500	

== Competitions ==
=== Overall record ===
Competition	First match	Last match	Starting round	Final position	Record							
Competition	First match	Last match	Starting round	Final position	Pld	W	D	L	GF	GA	GD	Win %
National Soccer League	2 April 1977	25 September 1977	Matchday 1	11th	26	7	8	11	27	35	−8	26.92
NSL Cup	22 September 1977		First round	First round	1	0	0	1	0	1	−1	0.00
Total					27	7	8	12	27	36	−9	25.93

Source: Competitions

=== National Soccer League ===
==== League table ====
Pos	Team	Pld	W	D	L	GF	GA	GD	Pts
9	Brisbane Lions	26	9	5	12	27	41	−14	23
10	Brisbane City	26	8	6	12	30	35	−5	22
11	South Melbourne	26	7	8	11	27	35	−8	22
12	Sydney Olympic	26	7	7	12	25	38	−13	21
13	Canberra City	26	5	7	14	22	39	−17	17

Source: rsssf.com
Rules for classification: 1) Points; 2) Goal difference; 3) Goals scored

==== Results summary ====
Overall								Home						Away					
Pld	W	D	L	GF	GA	GD	Pts	W	D	L	GF	GA	GD	W	D	L	GF	GA	GD
26	7	8	11	27	35	−8	29	3	5	5	12	13	−1	4	3	6	15	22	−7

Source: worldfootball.net

==== Results by round ====
Round	1	2	3	4	5	7	8	9	10	11	6	13	14	15	12	16	17	18	19	20	21	22	23	24	25	26
Ground	A	H	A	H	A	A	H	H	A	H	H	H	A	H	A	A	H	H	A	H	A	A	H	A	H	A
Result	W	D	D	L	L	W	D	W	D	W	L	W	L	D	W	L	L	L	D	D	L	W	L	L	D	L
Position	4	4	5	6	8	9	10	8	9	8	10	5	5	5	5	7	8	8	8	9	9	9	9	9	10	11
Points	2	3	4	4	4	6	7	9	10	12	12	14	14	15	17	17	17	17	18	19	19	21	21	21	22	22

Source: worldfootball.net
A = Away; H = Home; W = Win; D = Draw; L = Loss

==== Matches ====
Win Draw Loss

2 April 1977 1	Sydney Olympic	0–2	South Melbourne	Sydney
		Report	Ollerton 72', 85'	Stadium: Sydney Sports Ground; Attendance: 5,872; Referee: Tony Boskovic

11 April 1977 2	South Melbourne	1–1	Fitzroy United	Melbourne
	Cummings 57'	Report	Provan 88'	Stadium: Middle Park Soccer Stadium; Attendance: 9,000; Referee: Chris Bambridge

17 April 1977 3	Footscray JUST	2–2	South Melbourne	Melbourne
	Palinkas 16'; Kazi 69'	Report	Gibson 54'; French 87'	Stadium: Olympic Park; Attendance: 8,750; Referee: David Yelland

23 April 1977 4	South Melbourne	0–1	Brisbane City	Melbourne
		Report	Pimblett 73'	Stadium: Middle Park Soccer Stadium; Attendance: 2,300; Referee: Bob Henderson

30 April 1977 5	Marconi Fairfield	3–0	South Melbourne	Sydney
	Sharne 7' (49); Mariani 40'	Report		Stadium: Sydney Sports Ground; Attendance: 1,800; Referee: Tim Davies

15 May 1977 7	Eastern Suburbs	0–1	South Melbourne	Sydney
		Report	Gibson 53'	Stadium: Wentworth Park; Attendance: 750; Referee: Brian Fowler

21 May 1977 8	South Melbourne	0–0	Adelaide City	Melbourne
		Report		Stadium: Middle Park; Attendance: 5,200; Referee: Chris Bambridge

28 May 1977 9	South Melbourne	2–0	Mooroolbark	Melbourne
	Gibson 17'; Rogers 50'	Report		Stadium: Middle Park Soccer Stadium; Attendance: 4,000; Referee: David Yelland

5 June 1977 10	West Adelaide	1–1	South Melbourne	Adelaide
	Boyle 47'	Report	Macdonald 57' (pen.)	Stadium: Hindmarsh Stadium; Attendance: 7,500; Referee: Barry Wilkinson

11 June 1977 11	South Melbourne	1–0	Brisbane Lions	Melbourne
	Hagegmanouil 80'	Report		Stadium: Middle Park; Attendance: 4,800; Referee: Stewart Mellings

13 June 1977 6	South Melbourne	2–3	St George-Budapest	Melbourne
	Macdonald 45', 84'	Report	Gnavi 2'; George 22'; Jankovics 56'	Stadium: Middle Park Soccer Stadium; Attendance: 15,000; Referee: Stewart Mellings

26 June 1977 13	South Melbourne	2–0	Western Suburbs	Melbourne
	Gibson 58'; Rogers 87'	Report		Stadium: Middle Park; Attendance: 5,000; Referee: Bob Henderson

3 July 1977 14	Fitzroy United	5–2	South Melbourne	Melbourne
		Report		Stadium: Olympic Park; Attendance: 13,000; Referee: David Yelland

10 July 1977 15	South Melbourne	1–1	Sydney Olympic	Melbourne
	Mitten 46'	Report	Pirie 75'	Stadium: Middle Park; Attendance: 5,200; Referee: Jim Dixon

15 July 1977 12	Canberra City	0–2	South Melbourne	Queanbeyan
		Report	Pye 42'; Kalifatidis 86'	Stadium: Seiffert Oval; Attendance: 1,500

17 July 1977 16	Brisbane City	2–0	South Melbourne	Brisbane
	Conner 46'; Coyne 87'	Report		Stadium: Perry Park; Attendance: 5,187; Referee: Des Miles

24 July 1977 17	South Melbourne	0–2	Footscray JUST	Melbourne
		Report	Borovnica 38', 53'	Stadium: Middle Park; Attendance: 3,000; Referee: Chris Bambridge

30 July 1977 18	South Melbourne	1–2	Marconi Fairfield	Melbourne
	Mitten 42'	Report	Richards 20'; Rooney 29'	Stadium: Middle Park; Attendance: 3,000; Referee: David Yelland

7 August 1977 19	St George-Budapest	1–1	South Melbourne	Sydney
	Morgan 8'	Report	Ollerton 51'	Stadium: Marconi Oval; Attendance: 3,456; Referee: Barry Wilkinson

14 August 1977 20	South Melbourne	0–0	Eastern Suburbs	Melbourne
		Report		Stadium: Middle Park; Attendance: 2,000; Referee: David Yelland

21 August 1977 21	Adelaide City	2–0	South Melbourne	Adelaide
	Leane 75'; Northcote 90'	Report		Stadium: Olympic Sports Field; Attendance: 4,600; Referee: Richard Lorenc

28 August 1977 22	Mooroolbark	2–4	South Melbourne	Melbourne
	McGregor 30', 39' (pen.)	Report	Ollerton 24', 65', 73'; French 85'	Stadium: Esther Park; Attendance: 1,000; Referee: Tony Beazleigh

3 September 1977 23	South Melbourne	1–2	West Adelaide	Melbourne
	Cummings 66'	Report	Kosmina 19'; Boyle 70'	Stadium: Middle Park; Attendance: 2,200; Referee: Jim Dixon

11 September 1977 24	Brisbane Lions	2–0	South Melbourne	Brisbane
	Murray 21'; Laszlo 30'	Report		Stadium: Perry Park; Attendance: 3,528; Referee: Bill Jones

18 September 1977 25	South Melbourne	1–1	Canberra City	Melbourne
	Cummings 30'	Report	Alston 78'	Stadium: Middle Park; Attendance: 2,000; Referee: Jim Dixon

25 September 1977 26	Western Suburbs	2–0	South Melbourne	Sydney
	Wilson 53'; Manley 76' (o.g.)	Report		Stadium: Englefield Stadium; Attendance: 526; Referee: Henry Witschge

=== NSL Cup ===
Win Draw Loss

22 September 1977 First round	Mooroolbark	1–0	South Melbourne	Melbourne
	Lowrey 44'	Report		Stadium: Olympic Park; Attendance: 4,000; Referee: Tony Boskovic

== Statistics ==
=== Appearances and goals ===
Includes all competitions. Players with no appearances not included in the list.

No.	Pos.	Nat.	Player	National Soccer League		NSL Cup		Total	
No.	Pos.	Nat.	Player	Apps	Goals	Apps	Goals	Apps	Goals
—	MF	(Australia)	Jim Alexiou	5+7	0	0	0	12	0
—	—	(Australia)	George Bozikis	2+2	0	0	0	4	0
—	FW	(Australia)	Duncan Cummings	6+1	3	1	0	8	3
—	MF	(Australia)	John Daperis	21	0	1	0	22	0
—	DF	(Socialist Federal Republic of Yugoslavia)	Anton Dosen	10+3	0	0	0	13	0
—	FW	(Australia)	Graham French	18+5	2	0	0	23	2
—	FW	(Australia)	John Gardiner	14	0	0	0	14	0
—	MF	(Scotland)	Ian Gibson	22+1	5	1	0	24	5
—	—	(Australia)	Margaritis Hagegmanouil	20+3	1	0	0	23	1
—	DF	(Australia)	Kris Kalifatidis	24	1	1	0	25	1
—	MF	(Australia)	Chris Kent	15+2	0	1	0	18	0
—	—	(Australia)	Reno Lia	0	0	0+1	0	1	0
—	FW	(England)	Malcolm Macdonald	3	3	0	0	3	3
—	MF	(Australia)	Jimmy Mackay	1	0	0	0	1	0
—	DF	(Scotland)	Malcolm Manley	2	0	1	0	3	0
—	MF	(Republic of Ireland)	Noel Mitten	9	1	0	0	9	1
—	FW	(Australia)	Peter Ollerton	21	6	1	0	22	6
—	DF	(England)	Mike Pye	26	1	1	0	27	1
—	GK	(Australia)	Jack Reilly	24	0	1	0	25	0
—	MF	(Australia)	Billy Rogers	16	4	1	0	17	4
—	GK	(Greece)	Lou Tsigaris	2	0	0	0	2	0
—	DF	(Australia)	Arthur Xanthopoulos	25	0	1	0	26	0

=== Disciplinary record ===
Includes all competitions. The list is sorted by squad number when total cards are equal. Players with no cards not included in the list.

Rank	No.	Pos.	Nat.	Player	National Soccer League			NSL Cup			Total		
Rank	No.	Pos.	Nat.	Player	Yellow card	Second yellow card	Red card	Yellow card	Second yellow card	Red card	Yellow card	Second yellow card	Red card
1	—	FW	(Australia)	Peter Ollerton	1	0	1	0	0	0	1	0	1
2	—	DF	(Australia)	Kris Kalifatidis	4	0	0	0	0	0	4	0	0
3	—	MF	(Australia)	John Daperis	2	0	0	0	0	0	2	0	0
3	—	MF	(Scotland)	Ian Gibson	2	0	0	0	0	0	2	0	0
3	—	FW	(Australia)	Graham French	2	0	0	0	0	0	2	0	0
3	—	—	(Greece)	Margaritis Hagegmanouil	2	0	0	0	0	0	2	0	0
7	—	FW	(Australia)	Duncan Cummings	1	0	0	0	0	0	1	0	0
7	—	DF	(Australia)	Arthur Xanthopoulos	1	0	0	0	0	0	1	0	0
Total					15	0	1	0	0	0	15	0	1

=== Clean sheets ===
Includes all competitions. The list is sorted by squad number when total clean sheets are equal. Numbers in parentheses represent games where both goalkeepers participated and both kept a clean sheet; the number in parentheses is awarded to the goalkeeper who was substituted on, whilst a full clean sheet is awarded to the goalkeeper who was on the field at the start of play. Goalkeepers with no clean sheets not included in the list.

Rank	No.	Nat.	Goalkeeper	NSL	NSL Cup	Total
1	—	(Australia)	Jack Reilly	8	0	8
Total				8	0	8
