= Victoria men's soccer team results =

Victorian State soccer team

This is a list of Victoria men's soccer etam results from 1883 to 2009.

== Key ==
Key to matches

- Att. = Match attendance
- (H) = Home ground
- (A) = Away ground
- (N) = Neutral ground

Key to record by opponent

- Pld = Games played
- W = Games won
- D = Games drawn
- L = Games lost
- GF = Goals for
- GA = Goals against

== Results ==
Victoria's score is shown first in each case.

Match number	Date	Venue	Opponents	Score	Victoria scorers	Att.	Ref.
1	16 August 1883	East Melbourne Cricket Ground, Melbourne (H)	New South Wales	2–2	Riddell, Laird	2,000	
2	18 August 1883	South Melbourne Cricket Ground, Melbourne (H)	New South Wales	0–0		200	
3	16 July 1885	East Melbourne Cricket Ground, Melbourne (H)	New South Wales	4–0	Ware, U.F. Robbins, Dunbar (2)	600	
4	16 July 1887	South Melbourne Cricket Ground, Melbourne (H)	New South Wales	2–2	Miller (2)	300	
5	17 July 1912	Melbourne Cricket Ground, Melbourne (H)	Tasmania	8–1	Church (5), Forbes (x2), Brown	–	
6	24 June 1939	Unknown	Maccabi Tel Aviv	1–7	Unknown	–	
7	27 June 1939	Unknown	Maccabi Tel Aviv	1–8	Unknown	–	
8	7 August 1939	Unknown	Maccabi Tel Aviv	4–3	Unknown	–	
9	2 August 1947	Melbourne Cricket Ground, Melbourne (H)	South Africa	0–4		–	
10	22 August 1953	St Kilda, Melbourne (H)	China	0–4		15,000	
11	11 August 1954	Melbourne (H)	New Zealand	1–2	Unknown	–	
12	13 July 1955	St Kilda Cricket Ground, Melbourne (H)	South China	1–6	Unknown	–	
13	July 1955	Melbourne (H)	Rapid Vienna	0–11		–	
14	July 1955	St Kilda Cricket Ground, Melbourne (H)	Rapid Vienna	1–3	Unknown	–	
15	7 September 1955	St Kilda Cricket Ground, Melbourne (H)	South Africa	2–3	Piercy (2)	–	
16	7 July 1957	Olympic Park, Melbourne (H)	Ferencváros	1–6	Unknown	–	
17	14 July 1957	Olympic Park, Melbourne (H)	FK Austria	2–7	Unknown	–	
18	11 August 1957	Olympic Park, Melbourne (H)	Eastern Athletic	1–2	Unknown	–	
19	25 May 1958	Olympic Park, Melbourne (H)	Blackpool	0–8		20,000	
20	22 July 1961	South Hobart Oval, South Hobart (A)	Tasmania	3–3	Worsey (3)	–	
21	23 July 1961	South Hobart Oval, South Hobart (A)	Tasmania	3–0	Jurecki, Hodgson, Zielinski	–	
22	3 March 1962	Belmont Oval, Perth (A)	Western Australia	2–1	Barbazza, Margaritis	–	
23	5 March 1962	Belmont Oval, Perth (A)	Western Australia	5–0	Barbazza (2), Marinovic (2), Margaritis	–	
24	23 April 1962	Olympic Park, Melbourne (H)	New South Wales	0–2	Barbazza, Margaritis	–	
25	4 June 1962	Olympic Park, Melbourne (H)	Queensland	2–3	Beerendonk, Hartley	–	
26	18 August 1962	Hindmarsh Stadium, Adelaide (A)	South Australia	2–4	Doherty (2)	–	
27	14 October 1962	Olympic Park, Melbourne (H)	Tasmania	3–0	Margaritis, Jurecki, Campbell	8,000	
28	8 June 1963	Olympic Park, Melbourne (H)	Western Australia	8–1	Jankowski (3), Jurecki (2), Stankovic (2), Zientara	11,500	
30	24 May 1964	Olympic Park, Melbourne (H)	Everton	1–3	Mladenovic	29,000	
31	7 June 1964	Olympic Park, Melbourne (H)	Preußen Münster	2–1	Mladenovic, Malloy	17,000	
32	8 March 1965	Olympic Park, Melbourne (H)	Torpedo Moscow	0–4		25,000	
33	14 March 1965	Olympic Park, Melbourne (H)	Torpedo Moscow	1–4	McMeechan	16,500	
34	16 May 1965	Olympic Park, Melbourne (H)	Chelsea	0–1		16,000	
35	11 March 1968	Olympic Park, Melbourne (H)	New South Wales	0–0		6,000	
36	24 March 1968	Wentworth Park, Sydney (A)	New South Wales	0–1		7,286	
37	9 June 1968	Olympic Park, Melbourne	Cardiff City	1–1	Gadecki	15,000	
38	19 June 1968	Olympic Park, Melbourne	Cardiff City	0–6		3,800	
39	25 April 1969	Hindmarsh Stadium, Adelaide (A)	South Australia	3–0	Mihailjovic, Vojtek, Callum	4,300	
40	11 August 1969	Olympic Park, Melbourne (H)	Greece	0–0		15,000	
41	22 September 1969	Olympic Park, Melbourne (H)	New South Wales	2–2	Mackay, Gorrie	2,744	
42	31 January 1970	Olympic Park, Melbourne (H)	Romania B	0–1		5,200	
43	9 March 1970	Olympic Park, Melbourne (H)	Dynamo Moscow	1–7	Smart	18,000	
44	6 April 1970	Middle Park, Melbourne (H)	New South Wales	2–2	Vojtek, Utjesenovic	5,000	
45	29 April 1970	Sydney Sports Ground, Sydney (A)	New South Wales	1–1	Buljevic	2,268	
46	30 May 1970	Melbourne (H)	Werder Bremen	1–2	Micic	2,268	
47	15 June 1970	Unknown	South Australia	1–0	Unknown	–	
48	27 January 1971	Olympic Park, Melbourne (H)	Toyo Kogyo	3–5	Kokkinos (2), Rogers	3,000	
49	27 February 1971	Unknown	Dynamo Moscow	0–0		–	
50	14 March 1971	Olympic Park, Melbourne (H)	South Australia	0–3		–	
51	3 April 1972	Hindmarsh Stadium, Adelaide	South Australia	0–4		–	
52	14 May 1972	Olympic Park, Melbourne	Dundee	2–4	Rujevic, Buljevic	9,800	
53	2 February 1974	Unknown	Ferencváros	2–3	Unknown	–	
54	25 January 1974	Olympic Park, Melbourne (H)	Bristol Rovers	2–1	Howie, Armstrong	6,000	
55	19 May 1974	Olympic Park, Melbourne (H)	Legia Warsaw	1–4	Buljevic	13,121	
56	15 June 1974	Olympic Park, Melbourne (H)	Glasgow Rangers	1–5	Unknown	23,000	
57	15 July 1975	Nouméa, New Caledonia (A)	New Caledonia	3–0	Gillan, Gibson, Micic	–	
58	18 July 1975	Nouméa, New Caledonia (A)	New Caledonia	3–2	Buljevic, Micic, Cole	–	
59	17 August 1975	Olympic Park, Melbourne (H)	Benfica	0–2		12,000	
60	10 May 1979	Olympic Park, Melbourne (H)	Norwich City	2–4	Tront, Short	8,000	
61	12 August 1979	Olympic Park, Melbourne (H)	AEK Athens	4–0	Cole, Gilder	15,702	
62	21 October 1979	Olympic Park, Melbourne (H)	New York Cosmos	2–3	Cummings, Rooney	28,000	
63	11 January 1980	Olympic Park, Melbourne (H)	Red Star Belgrade	2–1	Cummings, Rooney	9,026	
64	8 October 1995	Wembley Park, Melbourne (H)	South Australia	4–2	Rusmir, Radecki, Markovski, Fak	–	
65	8 October 1995	Ramsay Park, Adelaide (A)	South Australia	2–2	Genovese, van Egmond	–	
66	10 February 1996	JJ Anderson Reserve, Melbourne (H)	JEF United	0–3		250	
67	2 June 2001	Epping Stadium, Melbourne (H)	New South Wales	1–3	Tsaltas	1,200	
68	10 June 2002	Melita Stadium, Sydney (A)	New South Wales	0–1		120	
69	2 October 2002	Tianjin, China (A)	Teda Tigers	0–0		8,000	
70	5 October 2002	China (A)	Guangzhou Apollo	–		–	
71	7 October 2002	Zhuhai Sports Stadium, Zhuhai (A)	Shenzhen	0–1		–	
72	9 March 2003	Epping Stadium, Melbourne (H)	New South Wales	2–1	Sapazovski (2)	400	
73	6 June 2003	Churchill Park, Lautoka (A)	Fiji	4–3	Becvinovski, Petrevski, Emsovski, Waite	–	
74	8 June 2003	Govind Park, Ba (A)	Fiji	3–1	Pino (2), Petrevski	–	
75	10 June 2003	National Stadium, Suva (A)	Fiji	1–1	Opazo	–	
76	18 September 2009	Wanderers Oval, Newcastle (A)	Northern New South Wales	3–2	Hockless, Rixon, Karpeh	–	
