= 1980 Brisbane Lions SC season =

Brisbane Lions
1980 season
- Head Coach: Matt Carson
- Stadium: Lions Stadium
- National Soccer League: 7th
- NSL Cup: Semi-finals
- Top goalscorer: League: Ron Millman (8); All: Ron Millman (9)
- Highest home attendance: 3,231 vs. Blacktown City (27 April 1980); National Soccer League
- Lowest home attendance: 1,500 vs. West Adelaide (30 March 1980); National Soccer League; 1,500 vs. Heidelberg United (13 August 1980); National Soccer League
- Average home league attendance: 2,474
- Biggest win: 3–0 vs. Grange Thistle (H) (25 April 1980); NSL Cup
- Biggest defeat: 1–4 vs. Blacktown City (A) (17 August 1980); National Soccer League; 1–4 vs. Newcastle KB United (H) (14 September 1980); National Soccer League

The 1980 season was the fourth in the National Soccer League for Brisbane Lions (now Queensland Lions Football Club). In addition to the domestic league, they also participated in the NSL Cup. Brisbane Lions finished 7th in their National Soccer League season, and were eliminated in the semi-finals of the NSL Cup.

== Players ==
Note: Flags indicate national team as defined under FIFA eligibility rules; some limited exceptions apply. Players may hold more than one non-FIFA nationality.

No.	Pos.	Nation	Player
1	MF	AUS	Steve Amos
2	MF	RSA	Paul Ontong
3	DF	AUS	Colin Bennett
4	DF	SCO	Jim Hermiston
5	DF	AUS	Alan Niven
6	MF	AUS	Gerry Lindsay
8	FW	AUS	Danny Wright
9	MF	AUS	Graham Wilson
10	MF	AUS	John Ogden
11	FW	AUS	Ron Millman
15	FW	AUS	Tom McGregor

No.	Pos.	Nation	Player
20	GK	AUS	Tony Scanlan
21	DF	AUS	Steve Hogg
22	MF	ENG	Eddie Spearritt
—	DF	AUS	Paul Burns
—	FW	AUS	Calvin Daunt
—	MF	SCO	Alan Hughes
—	FW	NZL	Mark McNaughton
—	DF	AUS	Ian Lawrie
—	GK	ENG	Nigel Lowndes
—		AUS	John Reid

== Competitions ==
=== Overall record ===
Competition	First match	Last match	Starting round	Final position	Record							
Competition	First match	Last match	Starting round	Final position	Pld	W	D	L	GF	GA	GD	Win %
National Soccer League	9 March 1980	28 September 1980	Matchday 1	7th	26	7	11	8	28	32	−4	26.92
NSL Cup	25 April 1980	10 September 1980	First round	Semi-finals	4	3	0	1	9	4	+5	75.00
Total					30	10	11	9	37	36	+1	33.33

Source: Competitions

=== National Soccer League ===
==== League table ====
Pos	Team	Pld	W	D	L	GF	GA	GD	Pts	Qualification or relegation
1	Sydney City (C)	26	16	5	5	51	26	+25	37	Qualification to Finals series (Note: The Finals series was not considered the championship for the 1980 National Soccer League.)
2	Heidelberg United	26	15	6	5	55	33	+22	36	Qualification to Finals series
3	South Melbourne	26	15	5	6	42	21	+21	35	Qualification to Finals series
4	Marconi Fairfield	26	14	6	6	53	32	+21	34	Qualification to Finals series
5	Adelaide City	26	13	4	9	40	27	+13	30	
6	Newcastle KB United	26	12	6	8	32	31	+1	30	
7	Brisbane Lions	26	7	11	8	28	32	−4	25	
8	APIA Leichhardt	26	8	7	11	27	35	−8	23	
9	Footscray JUST	26	7	9	10	32	41	−9	23	
10	Canberra City	26	7	7	12	34	33	+1	21	
11	Blacktown City	26	9	3	14	34	55	−21	21	
12	Brisbane City	26	4	10	12	29	36	−7	18	
13	West Adelaide	26	7	3	16	24	46	−22	17	
14	St George-Budapest (R)	26	5	4	17	32	65	−33	14	Relegated to the 1981 NSW State League

Updated to match(es) played on unknown. Source: rsssf.com
Rules for classification: 1) points; 2) goal difference; 3) number of goals scored.
(C) Champions; (R) Relegated

==== Results summary ====
Overall								Home						Away					
Pld	W	D	L	GF	GA	GD	Pts	W	D	L	GF	GA	GD	W	D	L	GF	GA	GD
26	7	11	8	28	32	−4	32	5	4	4	13	13	0	2	7	4	15	19	−4

Source: worldfootball.net

==== Results by round ====
Round	1	2	3	4	5	6	7	8	9	10	11	14	15	16	12	17	18	19	20	13	21	22	23	24	25	26
Ground	A	H	A	H	A	H	A	H	A	H	A	A	H	A	A	H	H	A	H	H	A	H	A	H	H	A
Result	W	L	L	W	D	W	W	W	L	W	D	D	D	D	D	D	L	D	D	L	L	D	D	L	W	L
Position	1	5	11	5	8	6	5	5	4	4	5	5	5	6	5	6	6	6	6	5	7	7	7	7	7	7
Points	2	2	2	4	5	7	9	11	11	13	14	15	16	17	18	19	19	20	21	21	21	22	23	23	25	25

Source: worldfootball.net
A = Away; H = Home; W = Win; D = Draw; L = Loss

==== Matches ====
Win Draw Loss

9 March 1980 1	Canberra City	2–4	Brisbane Lions	Canberra
	O'Shea 41'; Giampaolo 54'	Report	Williams 24' (o.g.); McNaughton 37'; Hughes 82'; Niven 85' (pen.)	Stadium: Bruce Stadium; Attendance: 5,400; Referee: Len Allen

16 March 1980 2	Brisbane Lions	1–2	South Melbourne	Brisbane
	Reid 50'	Report	Campbell 3'; Rogers 67'	Stadium: Lions Stadium; Attendance: 2,000; Referee: Dave Nugent

22 March 1980 3	Footscray JUST	3–1	Brisbane Lions	Melbourne
	Picioane 10'; Belic 15'; Vasic 65'	Report	Lindsay 8'	Stadium: Middle Park Soccer Stadium; Attendance: 2,210; Referee: Stewart Mellings

30 March 1980 4	Brisbane Lions	2–1	West Adelaide	Brisbane
	Millman 9'; Verweij 78'	Report	Honeyman 59'	Stadium: Lions Stadium; Attendance: 1,500; Referee: Col Amos

6 April 1980 5	Adelaide City	0–0	Brisbane Lions	Adelaide
		Report		Stadium: Hindmarsh Stadium; Attendance: 3,345; Referee: Bobby Kerr

13 April 1980 6	Brisbane Lions	2–0	Sydney City	Brisbane
	Niven 52'; Millman 54'	Report		Stadium: Lions Stadium; Attendance: 3,114; Referee: Ken Allen

20 April 1980 7	St George-Budapest	2–3	Brisbane Lions	Sydney
	Duarte 24'; Cotton 89'	Report	Lindsay 58'; Ontong 70'; McGregor 79'	Stadium: St George Stadium; Attendance: 2,094; Referee: R. Warren

27 April 1980 8	Brisbane Lions	1–0	Blacktown City	Brisbane
15:00 AEST	McGregor 71'	Report		Stadium: Lions Stadium; Attendance: 3,231; Referee: Des Miles

4 May 1980 9	Marconi Fairfield	2–1	Brisbane Lions	Sydney
15:00 AEST	Byrne 6'; Jankovics 63'	Report	Millman 72'	Stadium: Marconi Oval; Attendance: 4,825; Referee: Tim Davies

11 May 1980 10	Brisbane Lions	2–1	APIA Leichhardt	Brisbane
	Millman 67'; Spearritt 73'	Report	McAusland 46'	Stadium: Lions Stadium; Attendance: 2,836; Referee: Jim Reeves

18 May 1980 11	Newcastle KB United	0–0	Brisbane Lions	Newcastle
		Report		Stadium: Newcastle International Sports Centre; Attendance: 7,486; Referee: Alf Rodway

8 June 1980 14	South Melbourne	2–2	Brisbane Lions	Melbourne
	Buljevic 44'; Campbell 57'	Report	Millman 32', 76'	Stadium: Middle Park Soccer Stadium; Attendance: 4,500; Referee: Jack Johnston

15 June 1980 15	Brisbane Lions	0–0	Canberra City	Brisbane
		Report		Stadium: Lions Stadium; Attendance: 2,500; Referee: Dave Nugent

22 June 1980 16	West Adelaide	1–1	Brisbane Lions	Adelaide
	Honeyman 9'	Report	McGregor 3'	Stadium: Hindmarsh Stadium; Attendance: 2,789; Referee: Bobby Kerr

29 June 1980 12	Brisbane City	1–1	Brisbane Lions	Brisbane
	Kelso 67'	Report	Ontong 86'	Stadium: Perry Park; Attendance: 3,372; Referee: Tony Boskovic

13 July 1980 17	Brisbane Lions	1–1	Footscray JUST	Brisbane
	Hogg 14'	Report	Cozzella 49'	Stadium: Lions Stadium; Attendance: 2,500; Referee: Doug Rennie

20 July 1980 18	Brisbane Lions	1–2	Adelaide City	Brisbane
	Hermiston 89' (pen.)	Report	Mitchell 42'; J. Nyskohus 74' (pen.)	Stadium: Lions Stadium; Attendance: 2,500; Referee: Col Amos

27 July 1980 19	Sydney City	1–1	Brisbane Lions	Sydney
	Stevenson 37' (pen.)	Report	Millman 11'	Stadium: ES Marks Athletics Field; Attendance: 1,908; Referee: Henry Witschge

10 August 1980 20	Brisbane Lions	0–0	St George-Budapest	Brisbane
		Report		Stadium: Lions Stadium; Attendance: 2,400; Referee: Dave Nugent

13 August 1980 13	Brisbane Lions	1–2	Heidelberg United	Brisbane
	Millman 86'	Report	Cole 25'; Paton 34'	Stadium: Lions Stadium; Attendance: 1,500; Referee: Bob Mee

17 August 1980 21	Blacktown City	4–1	Brisbane Lions	Sydney
15:00 AEST	Hormazaball 8'; Wilkinson 23', 90'; O'Donnell 70' (pen.)	Report	Wright 88'	Stadium: Gabbie Stadium; Attendance: 1,768; Referee: Tim Davies

31 August 1980 22	Brisbane Lions	0–0	Marconi Fairfield	Brisbane
		Report		Stadium: Lions Stadium; Attendance: 3,212; Referee: Richard Lorenc

7 September 1980 23	APIA Leichhardt	0–0	Brisbane Lions	Sydney
		Report		Stadium: Lambert Park; Attendance: 1,720; Referee: Tony Boskovic

14 September 1980 24	Brisbane Lions	1–4	Newcastle KB United	Brisbane
	Ontong 64'	Report	Tredinnick 34'; McClelland 45'; Heys 53', 85'	Stadium: Lions Stadium; Attendance: 2,367; Referee: Peter Rampley

21 September 1980 25	Brisbane Lions	1–0	Brisbane City	Brisbane
	Verweij 49'	Report		Stadium: Lions Stadium; Attendance: 2,500; Referee: Henry Witschge

28 September 1980 26	Heidelberg United	1–0	Brisbane Lions	Melbourne
	Campbell 15'	Report		Stadium: Olympic Park No. 2 Attendance: 3,804; Referee: Chris Bambridge

=== NSL Cup ===
Win Draw Loss

25 April 1980 First round	Brisbane Lions	3–0	(Queensland) Grange Thistle	Brisbane
	McGregor 54'; Lindsay 61'; Ontong 70'	Report		Stadium: Lions Stadium; Attendance: Referee: Jack Wood

6 July 1980 Second round	Mount Gravatt (Queensland)	2–4 (a.e.t.)	Brisbane Lions	Brisbane
	Thompson 67' (pen.); Reid 84'	Report	Bennett 19'; Wilson 65'; McNaughton 92', 108'	Stadium: Perry Park; Attendance: 800; Referee: Peter Rampley

3 August 1980 Quarter-finals	Brisbane Lions	2–1	Sydney City	Brisbane
	Hermiston 50' (pen.); Millman 67'	Report	Bruce 86'	Stadium: Lions Stadium; Attendance: 1,800; Referee: Ken Allen

10 September 1980 Semi-finals	Marconi Fairfield	1–0	Brisbane Lions	Sydney
	Krncevic 3'	Report		Stadium: Marconi Oval; Attendance: 1,500; Referee: Jack Johnston

== Statistics ==
=== Appearances and goals ===
Includes all competitions. Players with no appearances not included in the list.

No.	Pos.	Nat.	Player	National Soccer League		NSL Cup		Total	
No.	Pos.	Nat.	Player	Apps	Goals	Apps	Goals	Apps	Goals
1	MF	(Australia)	Steve Amos	0+1	0	0	0	1	0
2	MF	(South Africa)	Paul Ontong	23	3	4	1	27	4
3	DF	(Australia)	Colin Bennett	26	0	4	1	30	1
4	DF	(Scotland)	Jim Hermiston	26	1	4	1	30	2
5	DF	(Scotland)	Alan Niven	25	2	3	0	28	2
6	MF	(Australia)	Gerry Lindsay	21	2	3	1	24	3
8	FW	(Australia)	Danny Wright	5+1	1	1	0	7	1
9	MF	(Australia)	Graham Wilson	14+5	0	3	1	22	1
10	MF	(Australia)	John Ogden	5+6	0	1	0	12	0
11	FW	(Australia)	Ron Millman	26	8	4	1	30	9
15	FW	(Australia)	Tom McGregor	12+2	3	1+1	1	16	4
20	GK	(Australia)	Tony Scanlan	19	0	3	0	22	0
21	DF	(Australia)	Steve Hogg	23+2	1	4	0	29	1
22	MF	(England)	Eddie Spearritt	3+3	1	0+1	0	7	1
—	DF	(Australia)	Paul Burns	1+2	0	0+1	0	4	0
—	FW	(Australia)	Calvin Daunt	2+3	0	1+1	0	7	0
—	MF	(Scotland)	Alan Hughes	8+2	1	1	0	11	1
—	FW	(New Zealand)	Mark McNaughton	18+3	1	4	2	25	3
—	DF	(Australia)	Ian Lawrie	1+2	0	0+1	0	4	0
—	GK	(England)	Nigel Lowndes	7	0	1	0	8	0
—	—	(Australia)	John Reid	5+2	1	0	0	7	1
Player(s) transferred out but featured this season
—	MF	(New Zealand)	Johan Verweij	16+4	2	2+1	0	23	2

=== Disciplinary record ===
Includes all competitions. The list is sorted by squad number when total cards are equal. Players with no cards not included in the list.

Rank	No.	Pos.	Nat.	Player	National Soccer League			NSL Cup			Total		
Rank	No.	Pos.	Nat.	Player	Yellow card	Second yellow card	Red card	Yellow card	Second yellow card	Red card	Yellow card	Second yellow card	Red card
1	2	MF	(South Africa)	Paul Ontong	7	0	0	0	0	0	7	0	0
2	6	MF	(Australia)	Gerry Lindsay	2	0	0	1	0	0	3	0	0
3	4	DF	(Scotland)	Jim Hermiston	1	0	0	1	0	0	2	0	0
3	5	DF	(Australia)	Alan Niven	2	0	0	0	0	0	2	0	0
3	21	DF	(Australia)	Steve Hogg	2	0	0	0	0	0	2	0	0
6	11	FW	(Australia)	Ron Millman	1	0	0	0	0	0	1	0	0
6	—	GK	(England)	Nigel Lowndes	1	0	0	0	0	0	1	0	0
Total					16	0	0	2	0	0	18	0	0

=== Clean sheets ===
Includes all competitions. The list is sorted by squad number when total clean sheets are equal. Numbers in parentheses represent games where both goalkeepers participated and both kept a clean sheet; the number in parentheses is awarded to the goalkeeper who was substituted on, whilst a full clean sheet is awarded to the goalkeeper who was on the field at the start of play. Goalkeepers with no clean sheets not included in the list.

Rank	No.	Nat.	Goalkeeper	NSL	NSL Cup	Total
1	20	(Australia)	Tony Scanlan	6	1	7
2	—	(England)	Nigel Lowndes	3	0	3
Total				9	1	10
