= List of South Melbourne FC seasons =

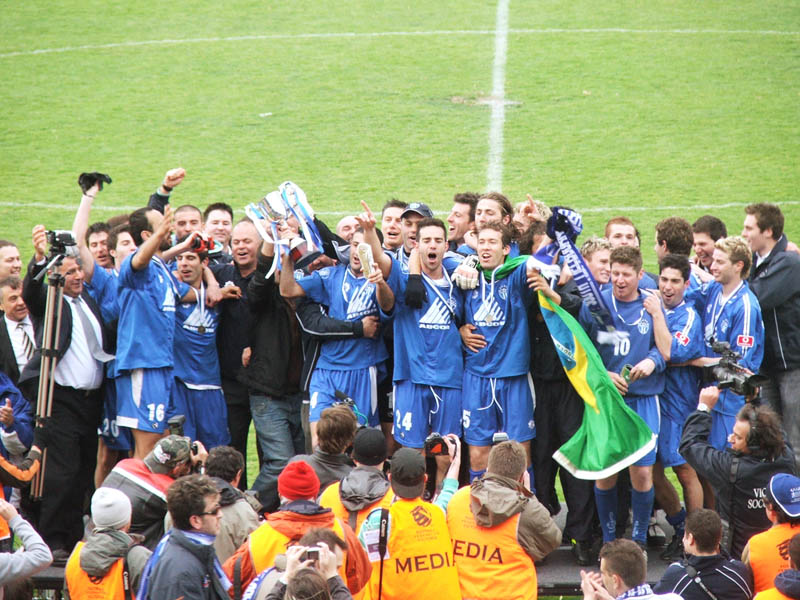
South Melbourne celebrate their 2006 VPL title

South Melbourne Football Club is an Australian semi-professional association football club based in Albert Park, Melbourne. The club was formed in 1959 as three clubs South Melbourne United, Hellenic and Yarra Park before it was shortly renamed to South Melbourne Hellas in 1960.

Before their entrance into the National Soccer League in 1977, South Melbourne won 8 premierships, 2 Dockerty Cups and 2 Ampol Cups. It was until the 1984 season, where South Melbourne won their first national competitive league in the Southern Conference. During the club's stadium move to Bob Jane Stadium (now Lakeside Stadium), the club were known as the South Melbourne Lakers with failure aspects afterward, they won the 1997–98 season of the National Soccer League and won another championship the next season which was their last in their National Soccer League career.

A move to the Bob Jane Stadium and a nickname change in the mid 90s injected new life into the club. South were known as the Lakers and after the 'failure' - by South's high standards - of the early to mid 90s (five Preliminary Final defeats), South Melbourne were able to shrug the finals monkey off its back by winning the 1997–98 Ericsson Cup.

As of the end of the 2020–21 season, the club's first team have spent 28 seasons in the National Soccer League, 33 in the top division of Victoria and the one in the second division of Victoria. Their worst finish to date is 14th in the National Soccer League, their placing at the end of the 1979 season. The club's longest period without a competitive honour is 7 years, between the 2007 and 2013 seasons.

The club set to play for Australian Championship from October 2025 after participating in NPL Victoria. On 6 December 2025, South Melbourne FC won the inaugural Australian Championship title.

On 29 August 2025, South Melbourne were announced as one of the eight founding members of the OFC Professional League by the Oceanian Football Confederation (OFC), as Australia's only member in the competition and also the only member outside of the OFC.

== Key ==
Key to league competitions:

- National Soccer League (NSL)
- OFC Professional League (OFC Pro League)
- Australian Championship (AC)
- National Premier Leagues Victoria (NPL Victoria)

- Victorian State League (State League)
- Victorian Metropolitan League First Division (Metro League 1)

Key to colours and symbols:

1st or W	Winners
2nd or RU	Runners-up
3rd	Third place
↑	Promoted
↓	Relegated
♦	Top scorer in division

Key to league record:

- Season = The year and article of the season
- Pos = Final position
- Pld = Matches played
- W = Matches won
- D = Matches drawn
- L = Matches lost
- GF = Goals scored
- GA = Goals against
- Pts = Points

Key to cup record:

- En-dash (–) = South Melbourne did not participate
- DNE = The club did not enter cup/finals play
- Group = Group stage
- R1 = First round
- R2 = Second round, etc.
- R32 = Round of 32
- R16 = Round of 16
- QF = Quarter-finals
- SF = Semi-finals
- RU = Runners-up
- W = Winners

== Seasons ==
Results of league and cup competitions by season
Season	Division	Pld	W	D	L	GF	GA	Pts	Pos	Finals	National Cup	Dockerty Cup	Competition	Result	Name(s)	Goals
Season	League									Finals	National Cup	Dockerty Cup	Other / Oceania		Top goalscorer(s)	
1960	Metro One North ↑	18	17	1	0	79	11	35	1st	—	—	SF	—	—	—	—
1961	State League	22	10	5	7	45	38	25	5th	—	—	R5	—	—	—	—
1962	State League	22	15	2	5	51	21	32	1st	—	—	GS	—	—	—	—
1963	State League	22	6	9	7	28	30	21	7th	—	—	DNE	Ampol Cup	RU	—	—
1964	State League	22	13	4	5	55	41	30	1st	—	—	SF	—	—	—	—
1965	State League	22	15	4	3	53	19	34	1st	—	—	R5	—	—	—	—
1966	State League	22	13	5	4	47	24	31	1st	—	—	SF	Ampol Cup	RU	Kostas Nestoridis	21
1967	State League	22	10	7	5	50	36	27	4th	—	—	RU	—	—	—	—
1968	State League	22	9	7	6	38	29	25	3rd	—	—	RU	—	—	—	—
1969	State League	22	9	3	10	40	39	21	7th	DNQ	—	DNE	Ampol Cup	W	—	—
1970	State League	22	9	9	4	36	27	27	5th	DNQ	—	RU	Ampol Cup	W	—	—
1971	State League	22	12	8	2	41	16	32	2nd	RU	—	DNE	Ampol Cup	RU	—	—
1972	State League	22	16	3	3	50	13	35	1st	—	—	R1	—	—	—	—
1973	State League	22	13	5	4	48	27	31	3rd	GS	—	QF	—	—	—	—
1974	State League	22	13	7	2	47	23	33	1st	GS	—	W	—	—	—	—
1975	State League	22	11	6	5	28	19	28	2nd	GS	—	W	Ampol Cup	RU	—	—
1976	State League	22	17	3	2	40	21	37	1st	RU	—	R2	Ampol Cup	W	—	—
1977	NSL	26	7	8	11	27	35	22	7th	—	R1	—	—	—	Peter Ollerton	6
1978	NSL	26	12	8	6	45	30	32	3rd	SF	R2	—	—	—	Duncan Cummings	11
1979	NSL	26	6	3	17	26	45	16	14th	DNQ	R1	—	—	—	Alun Evans	7
1980	NSL	26	15	5	6	42	21	35	3rd	PF	R2	—	—	—	Branko Buljevic	12
1981	NSL	30	13	13	4	41	27	39	2nd	—	R1	—	—	—	Alun Evans	14
1982	NSL	30	11	9	10	46	37	31	6th	DNQ	R1	—	—	—	Charlie Egan	20
1983	NSL	30	15	7	8	44	36	52	4th	—	SF	—	—	—	Duggie Brown	19
1984	NSL Southern	28	18	4	6	48	20	40	1st	W	SF	—	—	—	Duggie Brown	22
1985	NSL Southern	22	14	5	3	39	21	33	1st	PF	R1	—	—	—	Charlie Egan	21
1986	NSL Southern	22	10	5	7	27	20	25	7th	DNQ	R2	—	—	—		
1987	NSL	24	9	7	8	32	34	25	6th	DNQ	RU	—	—	—		
1988	NSL	26	13	8	5	36	29	34	3rd	EF	SF	—	—	—		
1989	NSL	26	9	8	9	44	37	26	8th	DNQ	SF	—	—	—		
1989–90	NSL	26	15	6	5	42	23	36	2nd	SF	W	—	—	—		
1990–91	NSL	26	14	6	6	45	33	34	2nd	W	SF	—	—	—		
1991–92	NSL	26	13	5	8	51	28	31	3rd	PF	R1	—	—	—		
1992–93	NSL	26	18	4	4	51	23	58	1st	SF	R2	—	—	—		
1993–94	NSL	26	13	8	5	39	20	47	2nd	PF	SF	—	—	—		
1994–95	NSL	24	9	5	10	42	36	44	6th	PF	SF	—	—	—		
1995–96	NSL	33	14	12	17	47	33	54	8th	DNQ	W	—	—	—		
1996–97	NSL	26	14	4	8	39	25	46	3rd	PF	SF	—	—	—		
1997–98	NSL	26	13	9	4	56	41	48	1st	W	—	—	—	—		
1998–99	NSL	28	17	6	5	50	26	57	2nd	W	—	—	—	—		
1999–2000	NSL	28	17	6	5	50	26	57	10th	DNQ	—	—	Club Championship	W		
2000–01	NSL	28	21	6	3	70	24	69	1st	RU	—	—	—	—		
2001–02	NSL	24	10	6	8	30	22	36	5th	SF	—	—	—	—		
2002–03	NSL	24	10	5	9	36	37	35	7th	DNQ	—	—	—	—		
2003–04	NSL	24	11	4	9	39	21	37	5th	SF	—	—	—	—		
2005	Prem	26	13	7	6	30	17	46	3rd	PF	—	—	—	—		
2006	Prem	26	12	7	7	45	28	42	3rd	W	—	—	—	—		
2007	Prem	26	10	7	9	39	33	37	7th	DNQ	—	—	—	—		
2008	Prem	26	10	4	12	35	32	34	9th	DNQ	—	—	—	—		
2009	Prem	22	10	7	5	41	22	37	5th	EF	—	—	—	—		
2010	Prem	22	10	6	6	41	28	30	6th	DNQ	—	—	—	—		
2011	Prem	24	12	5	7	39	33	41	4th	SF	—	R5	—	—		
2012	Prem	22	9	5	8	34	31	32	6th	DNQ	—	R5	—	—		
2013	Prem	22	9	6	7	40	33	31	4th	DNQ	—	PF	—	—		
2014	NPL Victoria	26	21	3	2	59	22	66	1st	—	DNQ	QF	—	—		
2015	NPL Victoria	26	18	4	4	58	22	58	1st	RU	R32	QF	—	—		
2016	NPL Victoria	26	18	2	6	64	39	53	3rd	W	DNQ	QF	—	—		
2017	NPL Victoria	26	15	3	8	49	28	48	2nd	SF	SF	SF	—	—		
2018	NPL Victoria	26	8	4	14	48	53	28	10th	DNQ	DNQ	R5	—	—		
2019	NPL Victoria	26	10	4	12	27	42	34	8th	DNQ	DNQ	QF	—	—		
2020	NPL Victoria	5	1	3	1	7	7	6	8th	—	—	—	—	—		
2021	NPL Victoria	18	6	7	5	19	18	25	9th	—	R32	SF	—	—	Harry Sawyer	2
2022	NPL Victoria	26	20	2	4	59	20	62	1st	RU	4R	4R	—	—	Harry Sawyer	2
2023	NPL Victoria	26	20	2	4	54	21	62	2nd	RU	4R	4R	—	—	Ajak Riak	10
2024	NPL Victoria	26	19	3	4	53	20	60	1st	RU	SF	W	—	—	Harry Sawyer	16
2025	NPL Victoria	26	7	7	12	29	46	28	9th	—	R16	W	Australian Championship	W		
2026	NPL Victoria	26	13	2	11	39	36	41	4th	PF	W	R5	Australian Championship			
2026	NPL Victoria	26	13	2	11	39	36	41	4th	PF	W	R5	OFC Pro League	RU		
