= Noel Mitten =

Irish footballer

Noel Mitten (born 5 January 1957) was an Irish footballer who played as a midfielder during the 1970s.

He won a league winners medal with Bohemians in 1974–75 and was Bohemian's top scorer that season with 8 goals in 16 league games. Mitten scored in the 1974–75 League Cup final against Finn Harps and also netted in the replay. He made five appearances in European competition for Bohemians scoring in the 1976-77 European Cup Winners' Cup at Esbjerg fB. A former Manchester United trainee from 1972 to 1973, he later emigrated to Australia. Mitten's clubs in Australia included Frankston City, Essendon Croatia, Morwell Falcons, Maribyrnong Polonia and Sunshine George Cross FC.

For several years Mitten was head football (soccer) coach at Wesley College, Melbourne.

== Honours ==
Bohemians

- League of Ireland: 1974–75
- FAI Cup: 1976
- League of Ireland Cup: 1975
