= Alan Niven (soccer) =

Australian footballer

Personal information
- Date of birth: 4 July 1955
- Place of birth: England
- Date of death: 5 March 1999 (aged 43)
- Position: Defender

Youth career
- Wolverhampton Wanderers

Senior career*
Years	Team	Apps	(Gls)
1975	Nuneaton Borough	1	(0)
1977–1988	Brisbane Lions	252	(11)
- Mt Gravatt
- Rochedale Rovers
- St Helens

International career
1981–1983	Australia	8	(0)
- * Club domestic league appearances and goals

Alan Niven (4 July 1955 – 5 March 1999) was an Australian international footballer who played as a defender.

Niven was born in England and played youth football for Wolverhampton Wanderers. After representing Nuneaton Borough, he moved to Australia, where he made over 250 appearances for Brisbane Lions in the National Soccer League.

He made eight appearances for the Australian national team.

== Early life ==
Niven was born in England.

== Club career ==
Niven played youth football for Wolverhampton Wanderers.

In 1975, Niven made three appearances for Nuneaton Borough – one in the Southern League Premier Division and two in the Midland Floodlit Cup.

From 1977 to 1988, Niven represented Brisbane Lions in the Australian National Soccer League, making 252 appearances and scoring 11 goals.

== International career ==
Niven made his international debut for Australia in 1981 against Fiji. He went on to make eight 'A' international appearances for the side.

== Style of play ==
Niven played as a defender.

Gerry O'Hara, who played with Niven at Wolverhampton, described Niven as a left back with a similar playing style to Scott Golbourne.

== After football ==
Niven went on to work for the Queensland Government at the Queensland Water Resources Commission and the Department of Natural Resources.

== Death ==
Niven died on 5 March 1999, aged 43, after suffering a heart attack while playing soccer.

== Career statistics ==
=== Club ===
Appearances and goals by club, season and competition
Club	Season	League			National Cup		Continental		Other		Total	
Club	Season	Division	Apps	Goals	Apps	Goals	Apps	Goals	Apps	Goals	Apps	Goals
Brisbane Lions	1977	National Soccer League	22	0	1	0	—		—		23	0
Brisbane Lions	1978	National Soccer League	19	0	1	0	—		—		20	0
Brisbane Lions	1979	National Soccer League	14	0	2	0	—		—		16	0
Brisbane Lions	1980	National Soccer League	25	2	3	0	—		—		28	2
Brisbane Lions	1981	National Soccer League	27	0	4	0	—		—		31	0
Brisbane Lions	1982	National Soccer League	28	1	3	0	—		—		31	1
Brisbane Lions	1983	National Soccer League	30	5	1	0	—		—		31	5
Brisbane Lions	1984	National Soccer League	29	1	4	1	—		—		33	2
Brisbane Lions	1985	National Soccer League	18	2	0	0	—		—		18	2
Brisbane Lions	1986	National Soccer League	15	0	1	0	—		—		16	0
Brisbane Lions	1988	National Soccer League	25	0	2	0	—		—		27	0
Total			252	11	22	1	–		–		274	12

=== International ===
Appearances and goals by national team and year
National team	Year	Apps	Goals
Australia	1981	2	0
Australia	1982	4	0
Australia	1983	2	0
Total		8	0

== Honours ==
=== International ===
- Merlion Cup: 1982

== See also ==
- List of Australia international soccer players born outside Australia
