= Ian Gibson (Scottish footballer) =

Scottish footballer

Personal information
- Place of birth: Scotland
- Position: Winger

Senior career*
Years	Team	Apps	(Gls)
1973–1976	Fitzroy United Alexander	74	(31)
1977	South Melbourne Hellas	24	(5)
- * Club domestic league appearances and goals

Ian Gibson is a Scottish retired association football (soccer) player. Gibson is most notable for being a regular first team player for Fitzroy United Alexander in the Victorian State League. Gibson is also notable for playing for South Melbourne Hellas in the National Soccer League's inaugural season in 1977.

== Career ==
=== Fitzroy United Alexander (1973-1976) ===
After his arrival from Scotland, Gibson began his football career in Melbourne, Australia signing with Fitzroy United Alexander (now Heidelberg United) in the fast growing Victorian State League for the 1973 season. Gibson made his debut for the club in the second round on 8 April 1973, against future National Soccer League club South Melbourne Hellas in a 0–1 loss at Olympic Park Stadium. His first goal for the club came four rounds later on 5 May 1973, against Brunswick Juventus being the first the goal in 2–0 victory.

In what was the club's first ever competitive home match at the Brunswick Street Oval on 13 April 1975, following the club coming to an agreement with both the Fitzroy Lions and Fitzroy Cricket Club, Gibson scored the first goal in what would finish to be a 2–0 victory over South Melbourne Hellas in front of a near modern-day capacity crowd of 14'500 spectators in the memorable debut for the club.

In the four seasons Gibson spent with the North Fitzroy club, competing in the Victorian State League, Dockerty Cup, Ampol Cup and the State Preseason Challenge Cup, Gibson made a total of 89 appearances for Alexander, scoring 37 goals, including being an integral member of the 1975 state league championship victory, forming a famous link with fellow Scottish winger George Gillan. Gibson's last game for the club was on 12 September at the Brunswick Street Oval against Sunshine George Cross in a 1–1 draw.

=== South Melbourne Hellas (1977) ===
Following the assembly of the National Soccer League, Gibson along with fellow Scot and Fitzroy teammate & player-coach Jack Reilly were lured away from Brunswick Street Oval and joined rival Greek backed club South Melbourne Hellas on a one-year contract. Gibson made his debut for the club in the first round on 2 April 1977 against Sydney Olympic FC away in a 2–0 win. His first goal came in round 3 on 18 April 1977 against Melbourne based rivals Footscray JUST in a 2–2 draw. At the season's conclusion, Hellas disappointedly finished eleventh out of fourteen. Gibson and former Fitzroy teammate George Gillan, who played for Alexander in the 1977 season with difficulty for a regular spot, both retired from the game professionally.

== Career statistics ==
As of 18 October 2016

Club	Division	Season	League		Cup^{[A]}		League Cup^{[B]}		Other^{[C]}		Total	
Club	Division	Season	Apps	Goals	Apps	Goals	Apps	Goals	Apps	Goals	Apps	Goals
Fitzroy United; Alexander	Victorian State; League	1973	19	7	5	3	-	-	-	-	24	10
Fitzroy United; Alexander	Victorian State; League	1974	18	8	2	1	3	1	5	0	28	10
Fitzroy United; Alexander	Victorian State; League	1975	18	8	?^{[D]}		-	-	-	-	18	8
Fitzroy United; Alexander	Victorian State; League	1976	19	8	?^{[D]}		-	-	-	-	19	8
Fitzroy United; Alexander	Victorian State; League	Total	74	31	7	4	3	1	5	0	89	36
South Melbourne; Hellas	National Soccer; League	1977	24	5	1	0	-	-	-	-	25	5
South Melbourne; Hellas	National Soccer; League	Total	24	5	1	0	0	0	0	0	25	5
Career total			98	36	8	4	3	1	5	0	114	41

=== Footnotes ===
A. Includes appearances in the Dockerty Cup.
B. Includes appearances in the Victorian State League Cup.
C. Includes appearances in the Pre-Season Ampol Cup.
D. Fitzroy United Alexander did participate in the Dockerty Cup in 1975 and 1976, however individual player records were not kept, thus resulting in these statistics being in dispute.

== Honours ==
With Fitzroy United Alexander:

- (Victoria (state)) Victorian State League: Champions 1975
