= Ulysses Kokkinos =

Greek Australian soccer player and manager (1948–2022)

Personal information
- Date of birth: 1948
- Place of birth: Istanbul, Turkey
- Date of death: 3 January 2022
- Place of death: Melbourne, Australia
- Position: Forward

Youth career
- Pera Club

Senior career*
Years	Team	Apps	(Gls)
1965	Proodeftiki		
1966–1968	South Melbourne Hellas	21	(12)
1968–1969	Panathinaikos	1	(0)
1970	South Melbourne Hellas	11	(8)
1970	Panathinaikos		
1971	South Melbourne Hellas	10	(2)
1971–1972	Paniliakos		
1972–1973	Panserraikos	10	(2)
1974	Fitzroy Alexander	3	(0)
1974–1975	South Melbourne Hellas	24	(12)
1975	Hakoah Eastern Suburbs		
1976	Melbourne Juventus	19	(6)
1977	Fitzroy United	3	(0)
1978	West Adelaide Hellas	0	(0)
1979	Western Suburbs	2	(0)
1980	Floreat Athena		
1982	Northcote City	6	(1)

International career
1970–1971	Victoria	5	(2)

Managerial career
- 1980: Floreat Athena (player-manager)
- * Club domestic league appearances and goals

Ulysses Kokkinos (1948 – 3 January 2022) was a Turkish-born Greek Australian soccer player and manager, known primarily for his career in Victorian soccer, in particular with South Melbourne Hellas. He also played in Greece with Panathinaikos, Paniliakos and Panserraikos. In the early 1970s, he represented the state of Victoria against various touring sides, making five appearances and scoring twice.

== Biography ==
Kokkinos was born in Istanbul to Greek parents. His father Yannis was a timber merchant and wanted him to attend university and then go into the family business, but Kokkinos' prowess in soccer had led Lefter Küçükandonyadis to their door. Küçükandonyadis, who was Turkey's captain and of Greek descent, convinced Kokkinos' father to allow him to play for Pera Club, an amateur sports club based in Istanbul. However, in 1964, the Kokkinos family were forced to move to Athens, in the midst of the Cyprus dispute, where Turkish Prime Minister İsmet İnönü renounced the Greco-Turkish Treaty of Friendship of 1930, and took actions against the Greek minority. This meant that the family shop was locked, their bank accounts were frozen and they only had a week to leave the country.

He signed his first contract with Proodeftiki, who were Beta Ethniki Group 3 champions the previous season. He failed to settle in Athens and at sixteen years old, decided to purchase a ticket to tour the Patris which carried migrants to Australia. He hid in the workers' cabin, and by the time he was found, it was too late, so the workers took him under their wing. When the Patris stopped at Fremantle, Kokkinos left the ship to an address occupied by fellow Greeks and was given a change of clothes and a train ticket to Melbourne. Three days later, he arrived at Spencer Street station. Hungry and broke, he sat outside a Greek restaurant on Lonsdale Street for hours on end, where a daughter of a local priest took pity on him. She rented a room in Carlton for him, cooked him food and bought him new clothes. Kokkinos went to see South Melbourne Hellas, and attracted attention within twenty minutes by performing keepie uppies. Shortly after this, he signed with South as a junior and trained with the first team, later making substitute appearances for the side.

Kokkinos played on the same team as fellow Greek Kostas Nestoridis, who was simultaneously South's captain and coach. At the end of the 1966 season, Nestoridis went back to Greece to see his family, so John Anderson was named as caretaker coach. Anderson put Kokkinos in the squad during the 1967 Ampol Cup, and he scored a brace on his first start for South. Nestoridis returned to the club for the 1967 season, but was annoyed at Kokkinos' insistence on maintaining an afro hairstyle. When Kokkinos refused to cut his hair prior to a match against Melbourne Hungaria, he was forced to have a haircut at half-time. He scored a brace in the second half, helping South to victory. Kokkinos finished the season as the club's top scorer with fourteen goals. (Note: The Victorian State League recognises that Kokkinos scored twelve goals, following an appeal from Footscray JUST on the grounds that South had fielded an unregistered player in Nestoridis. Although South had won the match 2–1 with Kokkinos scoring both goals, the appeal was upheld and the result was changed to a 0–0 draw.) In the 1968 season, he made two more appearances for South, until he moved back to Greece to play for Panathinaikos on the invitation of Nestoridis. His former club Proodeftiki attempted to delay his signing, when they tried to enforce their original contract. Kokkinos travelled with the team on a pre-season tour to the United States, and performed well in a match against Inter Milan. After the match, Kokkinos and Vasilis Konstantinou violated a curfew by attending a party, and when they arrived back at the hotel, manager Lakis Petropoulos was waiting for them and sent them back to Greece. As a result of the scandal, he made a single appearance for PAO, and returned to play for South in the 1970 season. However, his second stint at South would be brief, as he rejoined PAO midway through the season, where Ferenc Puskás had just been appointed manager. Kokkinos quickly fell out with Puskás, after the Hungarian attempted to play him at left-back a couple of times, so he decided to go back to Australia, with the intention of playing for South again. His third stint with South also ended midway through the season, and was speculated by fans as a reason why the club were beaten by a point in that season's state league. Kokkinos left South to join amateur club Paniliakos where Nestoridis was the manager, and then signed for Panserraikos, with his only goals of the season saving the club from relegation.

He returned to Victorian soccer the following year, turning out for Fitzroy Alexander, South's crosstown rivals. By June 1974, he was back at South for the fourth time in his career, and finally won the State League, as well as that year's Dockerty Cup. He stayed on for the 1975 season, as the club finished as runners-up to Fitzroy, but they did win the Dockerty Cup for the second time. Kokkinos left to join Hakoah Eastern Suburbs, a club in the NSW State League First Division, but he was soon back in the Victorian State League, this time with Melbourne Juventus. The next year, Kokkinos had a short stint in the inaugural season of the National Soccer League, playing for Fitzroy United (formerly Fitzroy Alexander). Kokkinos was then signed by West Adelaide Hellas as a replacement for John Kosmina, who had joined English First Division club Arsenal. He did not make an appearance for the side, as his off-the-field activities caught up with him. Kokkinos was having an affair, and in order to fund a lavish lifestyle and a gambling addiction, he threatened to tell journalists of their relationship if she did not provide him money. He was taken to the Magistrates' Court of Victoria and sentenced to nineteen months in HM Prison Pentridge, of which he served just six. Upon his release from prison, and with his career now on the wane, Kokkinos had a short stint with Western Suburbs. In 1980, he moved to Perth as player-manager for Floreat Athena. However, the season ended in disaster as Athena were relegated. In 1982, he briefly played for Northcote City.

Although now a married man, his extramarital affairs continued, as did his alcohol and gambling addictions, and later, a dependence on cocaine. He fathered a son and then attempted to go into business, but the constant drug use led to a divorce. Kokkinos relocated to Queensland to start over, but he served two more jail terms in Melbourne for cocaine offences. It finally came to a head, when his father visited him in jail and broke down in tears. Kokkinos had never seen his father cry, and believed that despite his success in soccer, he had dishonoured the family name. He reconciled with his father, who returned to Greece and died in 2001. Kokkinos fathered another son, and later settled in Mordialloc, still keeping in touch with former players and attending South Melbourne's home matches. In 2009, he was inducted by South to their Hall of Fame.

Kokkinos died on 3 January 2022 in Mordialloc.
