= Roberto Vieri =

Italian footballer (born 1946)

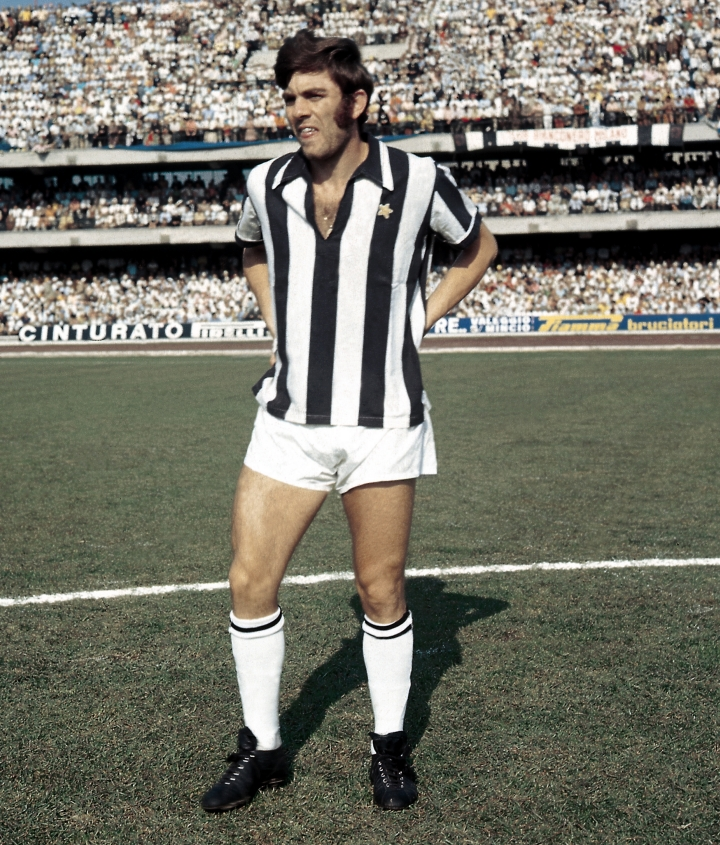
- Vieri with Juventus in 1969

Personal information
- Date of birth: 14 February 1946 (age 80)
- Place of birth: Prato, Tuscany, Italy
- Position: Striker

Youth career
- –1964: Fiorentina

Senior career*
Years	Team	Apps	(Gls)
1964–1966	Fiorentina	0	(0)
1964–1965	→ Prato (loan)	24	(11)
1966–1969	Sampdoria	84	(16)
1969–1971	Juventus	21	(3)
1971–1973	A.S. Roma	31	(1)
1973–1977	Bologna	37	(3)
1975	→ Toronto Metros-Croatia (loan)	9	(3)
1977–1980	Marconi Stallions	69	(17)
1981–1982	Prato	4	(1)
1982	Marconi Stallions	21	(1)
Total		300	(56)

International career
1967–1969	Italy U23	5	(1)
- * Club domestic league appearances and goals

Roberto Vieri (born 14 February 1946) is an Italian former professional footballer who played as a striker, and also as a central attacking midfielder or winger. Active in both Italy and Australia, Vieri made nearly 300 professional career league appearances, scoring over 50 goals. He also represented Italy at under-23 level, scoring a goal in five appearances.

== Personal life ==
Vieri was born in Prato. His sons Christian and Max are also professional footballers, who both appeared at the international level respectively for Italy and Australia.

== Career ==
Vieri started playing in the Fiorentina youth system before being loaned to Prato during the 1964–65 season, where he scored 11 goals in 24 matches and caused interest by Sampdoria of Serie B. He played for Sampdoria, both in Serie B and Serie A, until the 1969–70 season, when Juventus signed him for a then-significant 800 million ITL bid, plus Francesco Morini and Romeo Benetti. The next year, Vieri moved to A.S. Roma. During the 1973–74 season, he played for Bologna, winning the Coppa Italia during his first year with the team; he remained with the club until January 1977, when he accepted an offer by Australian football club Marconi Stallions, becoming one of the first Italian footballers to play abroad. He played with the Australian club until 1982, except for a one-year stint back at Prato. In 1983, he moved to Queanbeyan (New South Wales), where he became the player/coach of NSW State League club Inter Monaro for one year. In 1984, he returned to Sydney as part of the Marconi Stallions coaching staff. In 1996 Vieri moved back to Italy and relocated in Tuscany with his wife.

== Honours ==
Fiorentina

- Coppa Italia: 1965–66
- Mitropa Cup: 1966

Bologna

- Coppa Italia: 1973–74

Roma

- Anglo-Italian Cup: 1972
