= George Christopoulos =

Australian soccer player

Personal information
- Full name: George Simon Christopoulos
- Date of birth: 11 December 1960 (age 65)
- Position: Midfielder

Senior career*
Years	Team	Apps	(Gls)
1978–1981	South Melbourne	76	(18)
1982–1984	Canberra City	41	(1)
1983–1984	→AEK Athens (loan)	12	(0)
1984–1985	Heidelberg United	15	(0)
1990–1991	Adelaide City	9	(0)
Total		237	(0)

International career
1978–1983	Australia	13	(1)
- * Club domestic league appearances and goals

George Christopoulos (born 11 December 1960) is an Australian former soccer player, who played as a midfielder.

== Club career ==
Christopoulos played for South Melbourne, Canberra City, Heidelberg and Adelaide City in the Australian National Soccer League. In 1984 he played one season in Greece with AEK Athens.

== International career ==
He played ten full international matches for Australia, scoring once.

== Honours ==
Australia

- OFC Nations Cup: 1980,
