= Kris Kalifatidis =

Australian soccer player (1958–2025)

Personal information
- Date of birth: 3 January 1958
- Date of death: 5 December 2025 (aged 67)
- Position: Defender

Youth career
- South Melbourne Hellas

Senior career*
Years	Team	Apps	(Gls)
1975–1984	South Melbourne Hellas	106	(3)
Total		106	(3)

International career
1978	Australia	1	(0)
- * Club domestic league appearances and goals

Kris Kalifatidis (3 January 1958 – 5 December 2025) was an Australian soccer player who was a defender. He made one appearance for the Australia national team.

== Club career ==
Kalifatidis played his junior football for South Melbourne before playing ten seasons for the club. He played in the state league from 1974 to 1976 and then played the National Soccer League in 1977 to 1984. He was a part of the winning 1984 South Melbourne side who won their first national league title. He also scored the winning goal from a Jimmy Mackay corner in the final minutes of the Australia cup in 1976. By scoring volley from the 18 yard box into the top right hand corner of the net, South Melbourne beat St George of Sydney 2–1.

== International career ==
Kalifatidis played one match for the Australia national team against Greece in Melbourne.

== Death ==
On 8 December 2025, it was announced that Kalifatidis had died at the age of 67.
