= George Campbell (footballer, born 1957) =

Scottish footballer (born 1957)

Personal information
- Date of birth: 3 May 1957 (age 69)
- Place of birth: Caol, Fort William, Scotland
- Position: Left winger

Youth career
- 1971–1972: Kilmallie Youth Club

Senior career*
Years	Team	Apps	(Gls)
1972–1978	Aberdeen	39	(0)
1978–1982	South Melbourne Hellas (NSL)	104	(17)
1983–1985	Preston Makedonia (NSL)	50	(8)
1986	Green Gully (NSL)	29	(4)
1987–1989	Box Hill Inter (VPL)	62	(29)
1989	Fawkner Blues (VPL)	24	(2)
1990–1994	Nunawading City FC	161	(51)
1995	Ringwood City	27	(2)
1996	Knox City	22	(1)
1997–1998	Banyule City SC	65	(26)
Total		302	(61)

Managerial career
- 2000–2002: Essendon Royals (Senior Assistant Coach)
- 2000–2002: Essendon Royals (U21/Reserve Head Coach)
- 2009–2010: Northcote City (U21/Reserve Head Coach)
- 2008–????: Melbourne Football STARS (Head Coach & Director)
- 2011–????: Xavier College (Firsts Soccer Head Coach)
- 2016–2017: Dandenong Thunder (U20/Reserve Head Coach)
- 2018–2021: Eastern Lions SC (U20/Reserve Head Coach)
- * Club domestic league appearances and goals

George Campbell (born 3 May 1957) is a Scottish former professional footballer. He was born in the Highland town of Caol near Fort William in Scotland, and played for Aberdeen in the Scottish Football League. He was the youngest player to have ever made their debut for Aberdeen until Fraser Fyvie broke his record. He is one of only three Aberdeen players to have made their debut at 16 years of age.

He was nicknamed the White Pele and The Pele of the North because of his unique skill on the ball.

When George signed for South Melbourne Hellas in Australia, he became the most expensive player to enter the country with a transfer fee from Aberdeen to Australian club South Melbourne Hellas for £20,000 (AUD 50,000). The fee was considerable given the 21-year-old planned to stay at the club for only one year before returning to the Scottish Football League.

In April 2022 George Campbell was awarded a Life Membership with Football Victoria due to his services to football in Victoria and Australia both as a player and coach.

== Playing career ==
George Campbell played for Lochaber before joining the Kilmallie Youth Club as a 14-year-old in 1971. Campbell turned professional when he signed for Aberdeen FC in 1972, initially as a schoolboy. He spent seven seasons at Pittodrie Stadium as a left-sided midfielder.

While at the Dons, Campbell represented Scotland at the UEFA European Youth Championship Qualifiers in 1972 and 1973 at the age of 15 and 16.

Campbell was the youngest player to have ever made his debut for Aberdeen at 16 years and 8 months old, making his debut against Hearts on 10 August 1974 in a Scottish League Cup game at Pittodrie. The mark stood for 35 years until 22 August 2009 when Fraser Fyvie broke his record by a margin of 3 months.

Campbell won the 1975 Scottish Reserve Cup before breaking into the Aberdeen first team. He won the 1976 Scottish League Cup after Aberdeen beat Celtic 2–1 at Hampden Park in front of 69,707 supporters (though he did not take part in the match). He played a total of 15 Premier League and Cup matches, playing numerous senior friendly and European qualifying matches. He scored one of his two career goals for Aberdeen in the Anglo-Scottish Cup against St Johnstone on 6 August 1975, winning 2–0, and the other in a friendly game against League of Ireland club Finn Harps on 17 March 1976. Aberdeen had already beaten the Harps in the UEFA Cup in 1973.

He was signed by South Melbourne FC in 1978, Australia's most successful football club in history, who played in the National Soccer League of Australia, for a transfer fee of £20,000 (AUD 50,000). He became the most expensive player to enter the country and had planned to stay in Australia for only one season before returning to the Scottish Football League in a link with Dundee United's Jim McLean, although another broken leg prevented him from doing so.

Campbell was one of the best footballing talents ever to play in Australia's National Soccer League and in 1999 became a 'legend' of South Melbourne FC and is in South Melbourne's Hall of Fame at Bob Jane Stadium. Campbell won the Ampol Cup with South Melbourne FC in 1982 and helped South become runners up in the NSL in 1981 which was South's best ever National Soccer League placing at the time.

In 1982, after 104 appearances and 17 goals with South Melbourne FC, Campbell moved to National Soccer League club rivals Preston Makedonia and stayed there for three seasons, making 50 appearances and scoring 8 goals. He helped Preston reach the 1985 NSL Cup Final against Sydney Olympic at St. George's Stadium. He then moved to another NSL club, Green Gully, in 1985, where he made 29 appearances and scored 4 goals, winning the 1986 Dockerty Cup. He then signed for Box Hill Inter in the Victorian Premier League and stayed there for 2 seasons making 62 appearances and scoring 29 goals.

Campbell then signed for Fawkner Blues who were also in the VPL. He made 24 appearances for the Blues and scored 2 goals. Campbell was named the Player of the Year at Victorian Premier League club Fawkner FC for season 1989.

Campbell regularly appeared on Australia's only national football television programme called 'Match of the Day' on free-to-air channel 028, now known as SBS.

Campbell was not eligible for Socceroo representation as he had already represented Scotland, although he did represent Victoria and played against American footballing giants New York Cosmos, featuring German legend Franz Beckenbauer, Dutch legend Johan Neeskens and Carlos Alberto, one of Brazil's most highly regarded defenders of all time.

== Coaching career ==
Campbell was the senior assistant coach and under-21s coach at Essendon Royals in the Victorian Premier League in seasons 2000 and 2001. With the seniors, Campbell won the Victorian State League Division 1 and were promoted to the Victorian Premier League in 2001. Campbell then won the U21 Victorian Premier League title with Essendon in season 2001.

Campbell was the Football Federation Victoria U14 & U15 State Representative Coach in 2005 & 2006. Ex A League Melbourne Victory Senior Coach, Mehmet Durakovic, was his assistant for the FFV U14 state team in 2006. He also held various roles within the Football Federation Victoria, in particular being the brainchild of the youth Champions League Summer football program, having set up the first Academy system in Victoria.

He was the head coach of the Northcote City U21/Reserve Team who played in the Victorian Premier League for the 2010 season.

Campbell also runs his own academy named Melbourne Football STARS. He has taken football tours annually overseas composed of Melbourne's elite youth footballers to Scotland, England, Spain, Holland, Germany and Italy to play against European footballing opposition.

He currently coaches Xavier College Firsts soccer team and in 2011, 2015, 2016, 2018 and 2022 led them to win the prestigious Associated Public Schools (APS) trophy and the Australian Jesuit Cup in 2011, 2014, 2015 & 2016. Campbell also led Xavier to victory in the inaugural Football Victoria Premier School's Championship in 2022.

He has previously managed Dandenong Thunder U20s and Eastern Lions U20s in the National Premier League Victoria.

== Honours ==
Aberdeen

- (Scotland) 1976 Scottish League Cup Winners

South Melbourne Hellas

- (Australia) 1981 NSL Runners Up
- (Australia) 1982 Ampol Cup Winners

Preston Makedonia

- (Australia) 1983 NSL Third Placed
- (Australia) 1985 NSL Cup Runners Up
- (Australia) 1985 NSL Finalist
- (Australia) 1985 NSL Southern Conference Runners Up

Green Gully SC

- (Australia) 1986 Dockerty Cup Winners

Fawkner Blues in VPL

- (Australia) Player of the Year – 1989

In April 2022 George Campbell was awarded a Life Membership with Football Victoria due to his services to football in Victoria and Australia both as a player and coach.

== Records ==
With Aberdeen:

- Youngest player ever to make his debut until 22 August 2009 – 16 years 8 months
- One of three players to have ever made their debut for Aberdeen at 16 years of age

With South Melbourne Hellas in NSL:

- Most expensive transfer fee at the time for a player entering Australia – £20,000 (AUD 50,000)

In April 2022 George Campbell was awarded a Life Membership with Football Victoria due to his services to football in Victoria and Australia both as a player and coach.
