= Jack Reilly (footballer) =

Soccer player (born 1943)

Personal information
- Full name: John William Beattie Reilly
- Date of birth: 27 August 1943 (age 83)
- Place of birth: Stonehaven, Scotland
- Position: Goalkeeper

Senior career*
Years	Team	Apps	(Gls)
- Parkvale
- Inverurie Loco Works
1963–1967	Hibernian	2	(0)
1968	Washington Whips	17	(0)
1971	Melbourne Juventus		
1972	St George Saints		
1972–1974	Melbourne Hakoah		
1975–1976	Fitzroy Alexander	52	
1977–1980	South Melbourne Hellas	41	(0)

International career
1970–1977	Australia	35	(0)
- * Club domestic league appearances and goals

John William Beattie Reilly (born 27 August 1943) is a former soccer player who played as a goalkeeper. Born in Scotland, he was a member of the Australia national team, representing the nation 35 times during the 1970s; he was in the 1974 FIFA World Cup squad. and also represented Victoria.

== Career ==
Reilly learnt his goalkeeping skills while playing with local Aberdeenshire Junior sides Parkvale, in his hometown of Stonehaven, and Inverurie Loco Works, prior to moving to the reserve team of Hibernian. He made only two first appearances in the Scottish Football League before moving to American club Washington Whips in 1968. Reilly moved to Australia in 1970, signing with Melbourne Juventus. After showing immense talent during his debut season he was drafted into the Australia squad for a world tour. His transfer from St George Saints to Melbourne Hakoah in early 1972 was a then record fee for a goalkeeper of $6,000.

Reilly continued to represent Australia and was selected for their 1974 FIFA World Cup squad. He played in all of their three matches at the tournament, against West Germany, East Germany and Chile. Reilly transferred to Fitzroy United Heidelberg United in 1975. He spent two season at Fitzroy before transferring to South Melbourne. Reilly retired from playing in 1980.

After ending his playing career, Reilly became a horse breeder. He has also served on the committees of FFA and FIFA.

== Honours ==
Fitzroy United

- National Premier Leagues Victoria: 1975

Individual

- FFA Hall of Fame: 2004
- FFA Teams of the Decade: 1971–1980
