= Billy Rogers (soccer) =

Australian soccer player (born 1949)

Billy Rogers (born 16 July 1949) is an Australian former soccer player who played as a midfielder.

== Club career ==
Rogers played youth football for Sunshine City in Victoria before joining Melbourne Hungaria.

Rogers moved to New South Wales to play for APIA. After several seasons with the NSW State League club he joined South Melbourne for the first National Soccer League season in 1977. Rogers played 112 times for South Melbourne between 1977 and 1982.

In 1983, Rogers transferred to Brunswick Juventus, where he played in the Victorian Premier League. With Brunswick, he played 23 times during the 1984 National Soccer League season.

== International career ==
Born in South Africa, Rogers played four times for the Australia national team, including two full international matches against New Zealand in 1981.
