= Branko Buljevic =

Australian soccer player

Personal information
- Full name: Branko Buljevic
- Date of birth: 6 September 1947 (age 79)
- Place of birth: Split, PR Croatia, FPR Yugoslavia
- Height: 1.85 m (6 ft 1 in)
- Position: Striker

Senior career*
Years	Team	Apps	(Gls)
1967	OFK Beograd	1	(0)
1968–1976	Footscray JUST		
1977–1979	Fitzroy United Alexander	74	(21)
1980–1983	South Melbourne	87	(22)
1985	Footscray JUST	9	(0)
Total		171	(43)

International career
1972–1974	Australia	22	(7)
- * Club domestic league appearances and goals

Branko Buljevic (born 6 September 1947) is a former soccer player. Born in Croatia, he was a member of Australia's 1974 World Cup squad in West Germany and represented Australia 30 times in total between 1972 and 1975.

== Playing career ==
Buljevic began his club career with OFK Belgrade in the Yugoslav First League. He emigrated to Australia, where Buljevic spent nine seasons playing for Footscray JUST, then moving on to play for Heidelberg United and South Melbourne FC respectively. He returned to Footscray JUST for one more season before retiring in 1985.

After being naturalised, Buljevic made his debut for Australia in 1972. He made 30 appearances for the Socceroos, 22 of them in full internationals.
