= Middle Park Stadium =

Soccer venue in Middle Park, Victoria

Coordinates: 37.853°S 144.971°E

- Interactive map of Middle Park Stadium
- Location: Albert Park, Melbourne
- Owner: Victorian Government
- Capacity: 18,000 (2,000 seated)

Construction
- Opened: 1959; 67 years ago
- Closed: 1994; 32 years ago
- Demolished: 1994; 32 years ago

Tenants
- Melbourne Hakoah; Melbourne Hungaria; South Melbourne FC; St Kilda SC

Middle Park Stadium was a soccer venue located in the Albert Park sporting precinct in the Melbourne suburb of Middle Park. It was best known as the home of South Melbourne FC, which played at the venue from their inception in 1959.

The ground was demolished in 1994 as part of works for the Melbourne Grand Prix Circuit. It held approximately 18,000 people and consisted of a main stand with a capacity of 2,000, with open terracing around the rest of the ground.

== History ==
Soccer had been played in the Albert Park precinct since the 1880s. In the early 1900s the ground was used occasionally by the original St Kilda Soccer Club. In the 1950s, the site that would become Middle Park Stadium was designated as 'Oval No. 18'. During the 1950s, the site was used by South Melbourne United, and from 1957 by Melbourne Hakoah. In addition, a cycling track had been built around the perimeter of the soccer field in the early 1950s. By the late 1950s however, the cycling groups had abandoned the track due to spectators and soccer players' studs damaging the track.

The ground was a fully enclosed venue by 1960, and a grandstand built by South Melbourne Hellas and Melbourne Hakoah, partly with funds lent to it by the Albert Park management authority was opened in the May 1961. Further attempts to improve the venue were often met with hostility from local residents.

Apart from South Melbourne and Hakoah, one other tenant, Melbourne Hungaria, used the venue between 1969 and 1980. Other clubs to use the venue included Heidelberg United in the 1977 and 1978 National Soccer League seasons, as well as Brunswick Juventus in the 1990 and 1991 Victorian Premier League seasons. Middle Park also hosted the grand finals of the 1992, 1993 and 1994 Victorian Premier League seasons.

After the demolition of Middle Park, South Melbourne temporarily moved to Olympic Park Stadium until a new purpose built facility, Lakeside Stadium, was completed on the site of the former Lake Oval.

Middle Park Stadium hosted two matches involving the Young Socceroos and one 'B' international match involving the Australian men's national team, the Socceroos.
