= Duncan Cummings =

Australian soccer player (born 1958)

Personal information
- Date of birth: 20 March 1958 (age 68)
- Place of birth: Manchester, England
- Position: Striker

Senior career*
Years	Team	Apps	(Gls)
1970–1976	Melbourne Hungaria		
1976–1981	South Melbourne		

International career
1975–1976	Australia	2	(1)
- * Club domestic league appearances and goals

Duncan Cummings (born 20 March 1958 in Manchester, England) is an Australian former association football player and coach.

== Club career ==
Cummings joined Melbourne Hungaria Soccer Club as a 12-year-old in 1970. After six seasons with Melbourne he transferred to South Melbourne for a fee of A$8,500 plus proceeds from a match between the two clubs. He played at South Melbourne until 1981 when he retired at the age of 23.

== International career ==
Despite being born in England, Cummings made his international debut for Australia as a 17-year-old in 1975, becoming the youngest player to represent Australia. After scoring on his international debut against China he played only more full international match, against Hong Kong in 1976.
