= 1979 APIA Leichhardt FC season =

25th season in existence of APIA Leichhardt FC

APIA Leichhardt
1979 season
- Chairman: Stuart Macdonald
- Manager: Jimmy Adam
- Stadium: Marconi Oval; Wentworth Park
- National Soccer League: 8th
- NSL Cup: Second round
- Top goalscorer: League: Ken Reed (7); All: Ken Reed (8)
- Highest home attendance: 10,856 vs. Marconi Fairfield (13 May 1979); National Soccer League
- Lowest home attendance: 850 vs. South Melbourne (23 September 1979); National Soccer League
- Average home league attendance: 4,298
- Biggest win: 3–0 vs. Sydney Croatia (A) (25 April 1979); NSL Cup; 3–0 vs. Canberra City (H) (5 August 1979); National Soccer League
- Biggest defeat: 1–5 vs. Footscray JUST (A) (15 September 1979); National Soccer League

The 1979 season was the first in the National Soccer League for APIA Leichhardt Football Club. In addition to the domestic league, they also participated in the NSL Cup. APIA Leichhardt finished 8th in their National Soccer League season, and were eliminated in the second round of the NSL Cup.

== Players ==
Note: Flags indicate national team as defined under FIFA eligibility rules; some limited exceptions apply. Players may hold more than one non-FIFA nationality.

No.	Pos.	Nation	Player
1	GK	AUS	Greg Woodhouse
2	DF	AUS	Rod Skellern
3	DF	AUS	Warren Turnbull
4	DF	SCO	Eric Carruthers
5	DF	AUS	Peter Wilson
6	DF	AUS	Ian Rowden
7	DF	ITA	Rosario Rampanti
8	MF	AUS	Terry Butler
10	MF	AUS	Peter Stone
11		AUS	John Vernon

No.	Pos.	Nation	Player
12	FW	ENG	Ken Reed
13	MF	AUS	Ray Richards
14	MF	SCO	Brian O'Donnell
15	DF	AUS	Bob McGinn
16	FW	AUS	Rob Drewes
17		AUS	Mark Samuels
18	GK	AUS	Dave McQuire
—	DF	SCO	Jim Dempsey
—	DF	AUS	Mark Pullen
—	FW	AUS	Elwyn Roberts

== Competitions ==
=== Overall record ===
Competition	First match	Last match	Starting round	Final position	Record							
Competition	First match	Last match	Starting round	Final position	Pld	W	D	L	GF	GA	GD	Win %
National Soccer League	9 March 1979	23 September 1979	Matchday 1	8th	26	11	3	12	29	37	−8	42.31
NSL Cup	25 April 1979	20 May 1979	First round	Second round	2	1	0	1	5	3	+2	50.00
Total					28	12	3	13	34	40	−6	42.86

Source: Competitions

=== National Soccer League ===
==== League table ====
Pos	Team	Pld	W	D	L	GF	GA	GD	Pts	Qualification or relegation
1	Marconi Fairfield (C)	26	15	6	5	58	32	+26	40 (Note: A Bonus Point was awarded for victories of 4 goals or more.)	Qualification to Finals series (Note: The Finals series was not considered the championship for the 1979 National Soccer League.)
2	Heidelberg United	26	14	7	5	44	30	+14	36	Qualification to Finals series
3	Sydney City	26	15	3	8	47	29	+18	34	Qualification to Finals series
4	Brisbane City	26	14	5	7	38	30	+8	34	Qualification to Finals series
5	Adelaide City	26	13	6	7	43	27	+16	33	
6	Newcastle KB United	26	11	9	6	43	30	+13	32	
7	West Adelaide	26	10	4	12	28	31	−3	25	
8	APIA Leichhardt	26	11	3	12	29	37	−8	25	
9	Brisbane Lions	26	8	6	12	28	40	−12	22	
10	Footscray JUST	26	8	3	15	29	43	−14	20	
11	St George-Budapest	26	7	6	13	27	43	−16	20	
12	Canberra City	26	6	8	12	25	41	−16	20	
13	Sydney Olympic (R)	26	7	5	14	23	30	−7	19	Relegated to the 1980 NSW State League
14	South Melbourne	26	6	3	17	26	45	−19	16	

Updated to match(es) played on unknown. Source: rsssf.com
Rules for classification: 1) points; 2) goal difference; 3) number of goals scored.
(C) Champions; (R) Relegated

==== Results summary ====
Overall								Home						Away					
Pld	W	D	L	GF	GA	GD	Pts	W	D	L	GF	GA	GD	W	D	L	GF	GA	GD
26	11	3	12	29	37	−8	36	6	2	5	15	16	−1	5	1	7	14	21	−7

Source: worldfootball.net

==== Results by round ====
Round	1	2	3	4	5	6	7	8	9	10	11	12	13	14	15	16	17	18	19	20	22	21	23	24	25	26
Ground	H	A	A	H	A	H	A	H	A	H	A	H	A	H	A	A	H	H	A	H	H	A	A	H	A	H
Result	L	L	W	L	W	W	D	W	W	D	W	W	W	L	L	L	D	L	L	W	L	L	L	W	L	W
Position	12	14	13	12	12	10	10	7	6	6	4	4	4	4	7	8	8	8	9	8	8	8	8	8	8	8
Points	0	0	2	2	4	6	7	9	11	12	14	16	18	18	18	18	19	19	19	21	21	21	21	23	23	25

Source: worldfootball.net
A = Away; H = Home; W = Win; D = Draw; L = Loss

==== Matches ====
Win Draw Loss

9 March 1979 1	APIA Leichhardt	0–1	West Adelaide	Sydney
		Report	McCulloch 37'	Stadium: Marconi Oval; Attendance: 5,723; Referee: Tony Boskovic

18 March 1979 2	Brisbane City	2–0	APIA Leichhardt	Brisbane
	Echeverria 22'; Caldwell 71' (pen.)	Report		Stadium: Perry Park; Attendance: 3,100; Referee: Jack Wood

25 March 1979 3	Adelaide City	0–1	APIA Leichhardt	Adelaide
		Report	Samuels 74'	Stadium: Hindmarsh Stadium; Attendance: 5,176; Referee: Barry Harwood

1 April 1979 4	APIA Leichhardt	1–3	Newcastle KB United	Sydney
15:00 AEDT	Scott 2'	Report	Drinkwater 68', 73'; Boden 77'	Stadium: Wentworth Park; Attendance: 2,673; Referee: Henry Witschge

8 April 1979 5	Sydney Olympic	0–2	APIA Leichhardt	Sydney
		Report	Carruthers 14' (pen.); Stone 87'	Stadium: Pratten Park; Attendance: 6,751; Referee: Tim Davies

15 April 1979 6	APIA Leichhardt	1–0	Heidelberg United	Sydney
	Reed 36'	Report		Stadium: Wentworth Park; Attendance: 4,267; Referee: Peter Rampley

21 April 1979 7	Canberra City	0–0	APIA Leichhardt	Canberra
		Report		Stadium: Bruce Stadium; Attendance: 5,300; Referee: Ken Allen

29 April 1979 8	APIA Leichhardt	2–1	Brisbane Lions	Sydney
	Rampanti 16'; Wilson 65'	Report	Brennan 21'	Stadium: Wentworth Park; Attendance: 2,473; Referee: Jim Reeves

6 May 1979 9	Sydney City	2–3	APIA Leichhardt	Sydney
	Smith 6', 80'	Report	Reed 19', 53'; Carruthers 89'	Stadium: Wentworth Park; Attendance: 2,835; Referee: Richard Lorenc

13 May 1979 10	APIA Leichhardt	0–0	Marconi Fairfield	Sydney
		Report		Stadium: Wentworth Park; Attendance: 10,856; Referee: Stewart Mellings

3 June 1979 11	St George-Budapest	1–2	APIA Leichhardt	Sydney
	Matic 15'	Report	Butler 24', 41'	Stadium: St George Stadium; Attendance: 3,475; Referee: Jack Wood

10 June 1979 12	APIA Leichhardt	3–2	Footscray JUST	Sydney
	Roberts 11'; Dempsey 65'; Jovicic 86' (o.g.)	Report	Palinkas 54'; Kondarios 70'	Stadium: Wentworth Park; Attendance: 4,287; Referee: Henry Witschge

18 June 1979 13	South Melbourne	1–2	APIA Leichhardt	Melbourne
	Lutton 38'	Report	Butler 22'; Pye 85' (o.g.)	Stadium: Middle Park Soccer Stadium; Attendance: 12,000; Referee: Don Campbell

24 June 1979 14	APIA Leichhardt	1–2	Brisbane City	Sydney
	Reed 55'	Report	Coyne 7'; Kelso 35'	Stadium: Wentworth Park; Attendance: 5,023; Referee: Tony Boskovic

1 July 1979 15	West Adelaide	3–1	APIA Leichhardt	Adelaide
	Kosmina 17'; Boyle 29'; Norris 73'	Report	Roberts 87'	Stadium: Hindmarsh Stadium; Attendance: 3,800; Referee: Stewart Mellings

7 July 1979 16	Newcastle KB United	1–0	APIA Leichhardt	Newcastle
	Boden 32'	Report		Stadium: Newcastle International Sports Centre; Attendance: 10,012; Referee: Peter Rampley

15 July 1979 17	APIA Leichhardt	1–1	Adelaide City	Sydney
	Reed 87'	Report	Deans 56'	Stadium: Wentworth Park; Attendance: 2,968; Referee: Dave Nugent

22 July 1979 18	APIA Leichhardt	0–2	Sydney Olympic	Sydney
		Report	Jennings 71'; Scott 80'	Stadium: Wentworth Park; Attendance: 5,386; Referee: Richard Lorenc

29 July 1979 19	Heidelberg United	2–1	APIA Leichhardt	Melbourne
	Paton 2'; Cole 71'	Report	Yzendoorn 43' (o.g.)	Stadium: Olympic Park; Attendance: 7,000; Referee: Tony Beazleigh

5 August 1979 20	APIA Leichhardt	3–0	Canberra City	Sydney
	Reed 5', 46'; McGinn 80'	Report		Stadium: Wentworth Park; Attendance: 3,728; Referee: Henry Witschge

26 August 1979 22	APIA Leichhardt	0–3	Sydney City	Sydney
		Report	Barnes 42'; Trenter 46'; Silva 74'	Stadium: Wentworth Park; Attendance: 4,620; Referee: Tony Boskovic

29 August 1979 21	Brisbane Lions	2–1	APIA Leichhardt	Brisbane
	Spearritt 36'; Fairbrother 67'	Report	Stone 88'	Stadium: Perry Park; Attendance: 850; Referee: Bob Mee

2 September 1979 23	Marconi Fairfeild	2–0	APIA Leichhardt	Sydney
	Sharne 25'; Krncevic 55'	Report		Stadium: Marconi Oval; Attendance: 10,837; Referee: Chris Bambridge

9 September 1979 24	APIA Leichhardt	1–0	St George-Budapest	Sydney
	Drewes 44'	Report		Stadium: Wentworth Park; Attendance: 3,026; Referee: Tony Boskovic

15 September 1979 25	Footscray JUST	5–1	APIA Leichhardt	Melbourne
	Picioane 8'; Ollerton 23'; Palinkas 55' (pen.), 77' (pen.); Rujevic 65'	Report	O'Donnell 14'	Stadium: Middle Park Soccer Stadium; Attendance: 2,500; Referee: Don Campbell

23 September 1979 26	APIA Leichhardt	2–1	South Melbourne	Sydney
	Drewes 23'; Stone 72'	Report	Ristovski 47'	Stadium: Wentworth Park; Attendance: 850; Referee: Ken Allen

=== NSL Cup ===
Win Draw Loss

25 April 1979 First round	Sydney Croatia (New South Wales)	0–3	APIA Leichhardt	Sydney
		Report	Samuels 58', 60'; Drewes 88'	Stadium: Wentworth Park; Attendance: Referee: Tim Davies

20 May 1979 Second round	St George-Budapest	3–2	APIA Leichhardt	Sydney
	J. O'Shea 53'; O'Connor 58'; Hensman 86'	Report	Reed 9'; Rampanti 61'	Stadium: St George Stadium; Attendance: 2,783; Referee: Bill Jones

== Statistics ==
=== Appearances and goals ===
Includes all competitions. Players with no appearances not included in the list.

No.	Pos.	Nat.	Player	National Soccer League		NSL Cup		Total	
No.	Pos.	Nat.	Player	Apps	Goals	Apps	Goals	Apps	Goals
1	GK	(Australia)	Greg Woodhouse	23	0	2	0	25	0
2	DF	(Australia)	Rod Skellern	13+3	0	1	0	17	0
3	DF	(Australia)	Warren Turnbull	16+2	0	2	0	20	0
4	DF	(Scotland)	Eric Carruthers	18+2	2	2	0	22	2
5	DF	(Australia)	Peter Wilson	24	1	2	0	26	1
6	DF	(Australia)	Ian Rowden	7	0	0	0	7	0
7	DF	(Italy)	Rosario Rampanti	19+1	1	1	1	21	2
8	MF	(Australia)	Terry Butler	23+1	3	1	0	25	3
10	MF	(Australia)	Peter Stone	22	3	2	0	24	3
11	—	(Australia)	John Vernon	7+3	0	1	0	11	0
12	FW	(England)	Ken Reed	22+1	7	2	1	25	8
13	MF	(Australia)	Ray Richards	4+1	0	0	0	5	0
14	MF	(Scotland)	Brian O'Donnell	16+5	0	2	0	23	0
15	DF	(Australia)	Bob McGinn	14	1	1	0	15	1
16	FW	(Australia)	Rob Drewes	6+8	2	0+1	1	15	3
17	—	(Australia)	Mark Samuels	3+5	1	1+1	2	10	3
18	GK	(Australia)	Dave McQuire	3	0	0	0	3	0
—	DF	(Scotland)	Jim Dempsey	17	1	1	0	18	1
—	DF	(Australia)	Mark Pullen	14+3	0	1+1	0	19	0
—	FW	(Australia)	Elwyn Roberts	12+1	2	0	0	13	2
Player(s) transferred out but featured this season
9	FW	(Australia)	Andy Scott	3+1	1	0	0	4	1

=== Disciplinary record ===
Includes all competitions. The list is sorted by squad number when total cards are equal. Players with no cards not included in the list.

Rank	No.	Pos.	Nat.	Player	National Soccer League			NSL Cup			Total			
Rank	No.	Pos.	Nat.	Player	Yellow card	Second yellow card	Red card	Yellow card	Second yellow card	Red card	Yellow card	Second yellow card	Red card	
1	12	FW	(England)	Ken Reed	4	0	1	0	0	0	4	0	1	
2	3	DF	(Australia)	Warren Turnbull	6	0	0	0	0	0	6	0	0	
3	5	DF	(Australia)	Peter Wilson	4	0	0	1	0	0	5	0	0	
4	4	DF	(Scotland)	Eric Carruthers	2	0	0	1	0	0	3	0	0	
4	14	MF	(Scotland)	Brian O'Donnell	3	0	0	0	0	0	3	0	0	
4	15	DF	(Australia)	Bob McGinn	3	0	0	0	0	0	3	0	0	
4	—	DF	(Scotland)	Jim Dempsey	3	0	0	0	0	0	3	0	0	
8	7	DF	(Italy)	Rosario Rampanti	2	0	0	0	0	0	2	0	0	
8	—	DF	(Australia)	Mark Pullen	2	0	0	0	0	0	2	0	0	
8	—	FW	(Australia)	Elwyn Roberts	2	0	0	0	0	0	2	0	0	
11	2	DF	(Australia)	Rod Skellern	1	0	0	0	0	0	1	0	0	
11	8	MF	(Australia)	Terry Butler	1	0	0	0	0	0	1	0	0	
11	16	FW	(Australia)	Rob Drewes	1	0	0	0	0	0	1	0	0	
11	Total					34	0	1	2	0	0	36	0	1

=== Clean sheets ===
Includes all competitions. The list is sorted by squad number when total clean sheets are equal. Numbers in parentheses represent games where both goalkeepers participated and both kept a clean sheet; the number in parentheses is awarded to the goalkeeper who was substituted on, whilst a full clean sheet is awarded to the goalkeeper who was on the field at the start of play. Goalkeepers with no clean sheets not included in the list.

Rank	No.	Nat.	Goalkeeper	NSL	NSL Cup	Total
1	1	(Australia)	Greg Woodhouse	6	1	7
1	18	(Australia)	Dave McQuire	1	0	1
Total				7	1	8
