= 1980 APIA Leichhardt FC season =

2nd season in existence of APIA Leichhardt FC in the National Soccer League

APIA Leichhardt
1980 season
- Manager: Willie Wallace; John Green
- Stadium: Lambert Park
- National Soccer League: 8th
- NSL Cup: Second round
- Top goalscorer: League: Phil O'Connor (10); All: Phil O'Connor (10)
- Highest home attendance: 8,305 vs. Marconi Fairfield (23 March 1980); National Soccer League
- Lowest home attendance: 1,306 vs. Adelaide City (9 March 1980); National Soccer League
- Average home league attendance: 3,200
- Biggest win: 4–0 vs. West Adelaide (A) (10 August 1980); National Soccer League
- Biggest defeat: 0–5 vs. Heidelberg United (H) (6 April 1980); National Soccer League

The 1980 season was the second in the National Soccer League for APIA Leichhardt Football Club. In addition to the domestic league, they also participated in the NSL Cup. APIA Leichhardt finished 8th in their National Soccer League season, and were eliminated in the second round of the NSL Cup.

== Players ==
Note: Flags indicate national team as defined under FIFA eligibility rules; some limited exceptions apply. Players may hold more than one non-FIFA nationality.

No.	Pos.	Nation	Player
1	GK	AUS	Greg Woodhouse
2	DF	AUS	Bob McGinn
3	FW	SCO	John Bradley
5	DF	AUS	Peter Wilson
6	DF	SCO	Jim Dempsey (captain)
7	MF	AUS	Terry Butler
8	DF	AUS	Col McAusland
9	FW	SCO	Billy Pirie
10	FW	AUS	John Coyne
11	FW	AUS	Phil O'Connor

No.	Pos.	Nation	Player
12	FW	SCO	John McKie
14	MF	AUS	Dave Harding
15	FW	AUS	Rob Drewes
16	DF	AUS	Mark Pullen
18	FW	AUS	Tony Morsello
19		AUS	Mark Samuels
—	MF	AUS	Ian Gray
—	MF	AUS	Brian O'Donnell
—	DF	AUS	Rod Skellern
—	DF	AUS	David Watt

== Competitions ==
=== Overall record ===
Competition	First match	Last match	Starting round	Final position	Record							
Competition	First match	Last match	Starting round	Final position	Pld	W	D	L	GF	GA	GD	Win %
National Soccer League	9 March 1980	28 September 1980	Matchday 1	8th	26	8	7	11	27	35	−8	30.77
NSL Cup	25 April 1980	6 July 1980	First round	Second round	2	1	0	1	2	2	+0	50.00
Total					28	9	7	12	29	37	−8	32.14

Source: Competitions

=== National Soccer League ===
==== League table ====
Pos	Team	Pld	W	D	L	GF	GA	GD	Pts	Qualification or relegation
1	Sydney City (C)	26	16	5	5	51	26	+25	37	Qualification to Finals series (Note: The Finals series was not considered the championship for the 1980 National Soccer League.)
2	Heidelberg United	26	15	6	5	55	33	+22	36	Qualification to Finals series
3	South Melbourne	26	15	5	6	42	21	+21	35	Qualification to Finals series
4	Marconi Fairfield	26	14	6	6	53	32	+21	34	Qualification to Finals series
5	Adelaide City	26	13	4	9	40	27	+13	30	
6	Newcastle KB United	26	12	6	8	32	31	+1	30	
7	Brisbane Lions	26	7	11	8	28	32	−4	25	
8	APIA Leichhardt	26	8	7	11	27	35	−8	23	
9	Footscray JUST	26	7	9	10	32	41	−9	23	
10	Canberra City	26	7	7	12	34	33	+1	21	
11	Blacktown City	26	9	3	14	34	55	−21	21	
12	Brisbane City	26	4	10	12	29	36	−7	18	
13	West Adelaide	26	7	3	16	24	46	−22	17	
14	St George-Budapest (R)	26	5	4	17	32	65	−33	14	Relegated to the 1981 NSW State League

Updated to match(es) played on unknown. Source: rsssf.com
Rules for classification: 1) points; 2) goal difference; 3) number of goals scored.
(C) Champions; (R) Relegated

==== Results summary ====
Overall								Home						Away					
Pld	W	D	L	GF	GA	GD	Pts	W	D	L	GF	GA	GD	W	D	L	GF	GA	GD
26	8	7	11	27	35	−8	31	6	5	2	15	14	+1	2	2	9	12	21	−9

Source: worldfootball.net

==== Results by round ====
Round	1	2	3	4	5	6	7	8	9	10	11	12	14	15	16	17	18	19	13	20	21	22	23	24	25	26
Ground	H	A	H	A	H	A	H	A	H	A	A	H	H	A	H	A	A	H	A	A	H	A	H	H	A	H
Result	W	L	D	L	L	L	W	L	D	L	L	W	L	L	W	W	L	W	L	W	D	D	D	W	D	D
Position	3	6	7	9	11	12	10	11	11	11	12	12	12	14	13	10	11	11	12	11	11	10	9	8	8	8
Points	2	2	3	3	3	3	5	5	6	6	6	8	8	8	10	12	12	14	14	16	17	18	19	21	22	23

Source: worldfootball.net
A = Away; H = Home; W = Win; D = Draw; L = Loss

==== Matches ====
Win Draw Loss

9 March 1980 1	APIA Leichhardt	2–1	Adelaide City	Sydney
	O'Connor 14'; Bradley 58'	Report	Muir 81'	Stadium: Lambert Park; Attendance: 1,306; Referee: Dave Nugent

16 March 1980 2	St George-Budapest	1–0	APIA Leichhardt	Sydney
	Kay 5'	Report		Stadium: St George Stadium; Attendance: 3,864; Referee: Tony Boskovic

23 March 1980 3	APIA Leichhardt	2–2	Marconi Fairfield	Sydney
	Samuels 10', 23'	Report	Krncevic 29'; Sharne 81'	Stadium: Lambert Park; Attendance: 8,305; Referee: Peter Rampley

30 March 1980 4	Newcastle KB United	1–0	APIA Leichhardt	Newcastle
	Jones 39'	Report		Stadium: Newcastle International Sports Centre; Attendance: 7,517; Referee: Ken Allen

6 April 1980 5	APIA Leichhardt	0–5	Heidelberg United	Sydney
		Report	Cole 17', 44', 60'; Paton 35', 80'	Stadium: Lambert Park; Attendance: 4,021; Referee: Jim Reeves

13 April 1980 6	South Melbourne	1–0	APIA Leichhardt	Melbourne
	Christopoulos 23'	Report		Stadium: Middle Park Soccer Stadium; Attendance: 3,500; Referee: Don Campbell

20 April 1980 7	APIA Leichhardt	2–0	West Adelaide	Sydney
	O'Connor 7'; Samuels 75'	Report		Stadium: Lambert Park; Attendance: 2,682; Referee: Henry Witschge

27 April 1980 8	Sydney City	4–2	APIA Leichhardt	Sydney
15:00 AEST	Barnes 4', 28'; Boden 41', 71'	Report	O'Connor 83', 85'	Stadium: ES Marks Athletics Field; Attendance: 3,460; Referee: Tony Boskovic

4 May 1980 9	APIA Leichhardt	0–0	Blacktown City	Sydney
		Report		Stadium: Lambert Park; Attendance: 2,605; Referee: Doug Rennie

11 May 1980 10	Brisbane Lions	2–1	APIA Leichhardt	Brisbane
	Millman 67'; Spearritt 73'	Report	McAusland 46'	Stadium: Lions Stadium; Attendance: 2,836; Referee: Jim Reeves

18 May 1980 11	Brisbane City	1–0	APIA Leichhardt	Brisbane
	Gaffney 70'	Report		Stadium: Perry Park; Attendance: 2,215; Referee: Chris Bambridge

25 May 1980 12	APIA Leichhardt	2–1	Canberra City	Sydney
	Harding 6', 38' (pen.)	Report	Giampaolo 47'	Stadium: Lambert Park; Attendance: 2,789; Referee: Peter Rampley

8 June 1980 14	APIA Leichhardt	1–2	St George-Budapest	Sydney
	O'Connor 56'	Report	Campbell 22'; Duarte 76'	Stadium: Lambert Park; Attendance: 2,812; Referee: Chris Bambridge

15 June 1980 15	Adelaide City	2–0	APIA Leichhardt	Adelaide
	Barnes 14'; Fashanu 57'	Report		Stadium: Olympic Sports Field; Attendance: 3,200; Referee: Ken Allen

22 June 1980 16	APIA Leichhardt	1–0	Newcastle KB United	Sydney
	Summerscales 33' (o.g.)	Report		Stadium: Lambert Park; Attendance: 3,428; Referee: Henry Witschge

13 July 1980 17	Marconi Fairfield	1–2	APIA Leichhardt	Sydney
15:00 AEST	Mariani 30'	Report	McKie 43'; O'Connor 74'	Stadium: Marconi Oval; Attendance: 6,280; Referee: Stewart Mellings

20 July 1980 18	Heidelberg United	5–1	APIA Leichhardt	Melbourne
	Cole 2'; Rooney 16', 53'; Paton 74', 77'	Report	O'Connor 90'	Stadium: Olympic Park; Attendance: 2,700; Referee: Don Campbell

27 July 1980 19	APIA Leichhardt	1–0	South Melbourne	Sydney
	O'Connor 43'	Report		Stadium: Lambert Park; Attendance: 2,341; Referee: Richard Lorenc

3 August 1980 13	Footscray JUST	1–0	APIA Leichhardt	Melbourne
	Ilioski 22'	Report		Stadium: Olympic Park; Attendance: 1,000; Referee: Tony Beazleigh

10 August 1980 20	West Adelaide	0–4	APIA Leichhardt	Adelaide
		Report	Pirie 19'; O'Connor 26', 85'; Morsello 83'	Stadium: Hindmarsh Stadium; Attendance: 3,300; Referee: Tim Davies

17 August 1980 21	APIA Leichhardt	2–2	Sydney City	Sydney
	Pirie 29'; Coyne 45'	Report	Boden 48' (pen.); Smith 83'	Stadium: Lambert Park; Attendance: 3,965; Referee: Peter Rampley

31 August 1980 22	Blacktown City	0–0	APIA Leichhardt	Sydney
		Report		Stadium: Gabbie Stadium; Attendance: 3,148; Referee: Dave Nugent

7 September 1980 23	APIA Leichhardt	0–0	Brisbane Lions	Sydney
		Report		Stadium: Lambert Park; Attendance: 1,720; Referee: Tony Boskovic

14 September 1980 24	APIA Leichhardt	2–1	Brisbane City	Sydney
	Pirie 67', 77'	Report	Kelso 42'	Stadium: Lambert Park; Attendance: 2,103; Referee: Jim Reeves

21 September 1980 25	Canberra City	2–2	APIA Leichhardt	Canberra
15:00 AEST	Byrne 10', 66'	Report	Harding 53'; Coyne 62'	Stadium: Bruce Stadium; Attendance: 1,690; Referee: Bob Mee

28 September 1980 26	APIA Leichhardt	0–0	Footscray JUST	Sydney
		Report		Stadium: Lambert Park; Attendance: 3,519; Referee: Evan Venios

=== NSL Cup ===
Win Draw Loss

25 April 1980 First round	Ipswich United (Queensland)	0–1	APIA Leichhardt	Ipswich
		Report	Samuels 13'	Attendance: Referee: Des Miles

6 July 1980 Second round	APIA Leichhardt	1–2	Sydney City	Sydney
	Harding 40'	Report	Barnes 70', 90+5'	Stadium: Lambert Park; Attendance: 2,540; Referee: Jack Johnston

== Statistics ==
=== Appearances and goals ===
Includes all competitions. Players with no appearances not included in the list.

No.	Pos.	Nat.	Player	National Soccer League		NSL Cup		Total	
No.	Pos.	Nat.	Player	Apps	Goals	Apps	Goals	Apps	Goals
1	GK	(Australia)	Greg Woodhouse	26	0	2	0	28	0
2	DF	(Australia)	Bob McGinn	20+1	0	1	0	22	0
3	FW	(Scotland)	John Bradley	9	1	0	0	9	1
5	DF	(Australia)	Peter Wilson	24	0	2	0	26	0
6	DF	(Scotland)	Jim Dempsey	22	0	1	0	23	0
7	MF	(Australia)	Terry Butler	16	0	1	0	17	0
8	DF	(Australia)	Col McAusland	24+1	1	2	0	27	1
9	FW	(Scotland)	Billy Pirie	18	4	0	0	18	4
10	FW	(Australia)	John Coyne	14	2	0	0	14	2
11	FW	(Australia)	Phil O'Connor	26	10	2	0	28	10
12	FW	(Scotland)	John McKie	8+3	1	1+1	0	13	1
14	MF	(Australia)	Dave Harding	9	3	1	1	10	4
15	FW	(Australia)	Rod Drewes	4+6	0	1	0	11	0
16	DF	(Australia)	Mark Pullen	21+1	0	2	0	24	0
18	FW	(Australia)	Tony Morsello	13+5	1	1+1	0	20	1
19	—	(Australia)	Mark Samuels	2+4	3	1	1	7	4
—	MF	(Australia)	Ian Gray	0+1	0	0	0	1	0
—	MF	(Australia)	Brian O'Donnell	6+1	0	1	0	8	0
—	DF	(Australia)	Rod Skellern	16+4	0	2	0	22	0
—	DF	(Australia)	David Watt	1	0	0	0	1	0
—	DF	(Australia)	Warren Turnbull	0	0	0	0	0	0
Player(s) transferred out but featured this season
—	MF	(Australia)	Peter Stone	7	0	1	0	8	0

=== Disciplinary record ===
Includes all competitions. The list is sorted by squad number when total cards are equal. Players with no cards not included in the list.

Rank	No.	Pos.	Nat.	Player	National Soccer League			NSL Cup			Total		
Rank	No.	Pos.	Nat.	Player	Yellow card	Second yellow card	Red card	Yellow card	Second yellow card	Red card	Yellow card	Second yellow card	Red card
1	6	DF	(Scotland)	Jim Dempsey	4	0	1	0	0	0	4	0	1
2	5	DF	(Australia)	Peter Wilson	3	0	0	0	0	0	3	0	0
2	7	MF	(Australia)	Terry Butler	3	0	0	0	0	0	3	0	0
2	10	FW	(Australia)	John Coyne	3	0	0	0	0	0	3	0	0
5	9	FW	(Scotland)	Billy Pirie	2	0	0	0	0	0	2	0	0
6	3	FW	(Scotland)	John Bradley	1	0	0	0	0	0	1	0	0
6	8	DF	(Australia)	Col McAusland	1	0	0	0	0	0	1	0	0
6	14	MF	(Australia)	Dave Harding	1	0	0	0	0	0	1	0	0
6	16	DF	(Australia)	Mark Pullen	1	0	0	0	0	0	1	0	0
Total					19	0	1	0	0	0	19	0	1

=== Clean sheets ===
Includes all competitions. The list is sorted by squad number when total clean sheets are equal. Numbers in parentheses represent games where both goalkeepers participated and both kept a clean sheet; the number in parentheses is awarded to the goalkeeper who was substituted on, whilst a full clean sheet is awarded to the goalkeeper who was on the field at the start of play. Goalkeepers with no clean sheets not included in the list.

Rank	No.	Nat.	Goalkeeper	NSL	NSL Cup	Total
1	1	(Australia)	Greg Woodhouse	8	1	9
Total				8	1	9
