= 1980 West Adelaide SC season =

West Adelaide
1980 season
- Head Coach: Gerry Chaldi; Billy Birch
- Stadium: Hindmarsh Stadium
- National Soccer League: 13th
- NSL Cup: First round
- Top goalscorer: League: Lopez Manecas (6); All: John Kosmina; Lopez Manecas (6 each)
- Highest home attendance: 5,650 vs. Adelaide City (14 September 1980); National Soccer League
- Lowest home attendance: 2,450 vs. Footscray JUST (11 May 1980); National Soccer League
- Average home league attendance: 3,476
- Biggest win: 3–0 vs. Footscray JUST (A) (7 September 1980); National Soccer League
- Biggest defeat: 0–7 vs. Sydney City (A) (6 April 1980); National Soccer League

The 1980 season was the fourth in the National Soccer League for West Adelaide Soccer Club. In addition to the domestic league, they also participated in the NSL Cup. West Adelaide finished 13th in their National Soccer League season, and were eliminated in the first round of the NSL Cup.

== Players ==
Note: Flags indicate national team as defined under FIFA eligibility rules; some limited exceptions apply. Players may hold more than one non-FIFA nationality.

No.	Pos.	Nation	Player
1	GK	AUS	Martyn Crook
2	DF	YUG	Zoran Maricic
3	DF	AUS	Vic Bozanic
4	MF	SCO	Neil McGachey
5	DF	ISR	Shraga Topaz
6	DF	SCO	Ian McKie
7		AUS	Chris Key
8	FW	ANG	Lopez Manecas
9	FW	AUS	John Kosmina
10	FW	SCO	Graham Honeyman
11	MF	SCO	Ian McGregor
12	FW	RSA	Graham Norris

No.	Pos.	Nation	Player
13	FW	AUS	George Koulianos
14		AUS	Tom Forde
15	DF	ENG	Peter Tymczyszyn
16	MF	AUS	Steve Atsalas
17	DF	AUS	Tom Totsikas
18	MF	AUS	David Doorne
19	DF	SCO	Eric Carruthers
20	GK	AUS	Brian Gale
—	FW	AUS	Peter Boyle
—		AUS	Aldo Lorenzoni
—	DF	AUS	Nick Pantzaras

== Competitions ==
=== Overall record ===
Competition	First match	Last match	Starting round	Final position	Record							
Competition	First match	Last match	Starting round	Final position	Pld	W	D	L	GF	GA	GD	Win %
National Soccer League	9 March 1980	28 September 1980	Matchday 1	13th	26	7	3	16	24	46	−22	26.92
NSL Cup	25 April 1980		First round	First round	1	0	0	1	1	3	−2	0.00
Total					27	7	3	17	25	49	−24	25.93

Source: Competitions

=== National Soccer League ===
==== League table ====
Pos	Team	Pld	W	D	L	GF	GA	GD	Pts	Qualification or relegation
1	Sydney City (C)	26	16	5	5	51	26	+25	37	Qualification to Finals series (Note: The Finals series was not considered the championship for the 1980 National Soccer League.)
2	Heidelberg United	26	15	6	5	55	33	+22	36	Qualification to Finals series
3	South Melbourne	26	15	5	6	42	21	+21	35	Qualification to Finals series
4	Marconi Fairfield	26	14	6	6	53	32	+21	34	Qualification to Finals series
5	Adelaide City	26	13	4	9	40	27	+13	30	
6	Newcastle KB United	26	12	6	8	32	31	+1	30	
7	Brisbane Lions	26	7	11	8	28	32	−4	25	
8	APIA Leichhardt	26	8	7	11	27	35	−8	23	
9	Footscray JUST	26	7	9	10	32	41	−9	23	
10	Canberra City	26	7	7	12	34	33	+1	21	
11	Blacktown City	26	9	3	14	34	55	−21	21	
12	Brisbane City	26	4	10	12	29	36	−7	18	
13	West Adelaide	26	7	3	16	24	46	−22	17	
14	St George-Budapest (R)	26	5	4	17	32	65	−33	14	Relegated to the 1981 NSW State League

Updated to match(es) played on unknown. Source: rsssf.com
Rules for classification: 1) points; 2) goal difference; 3) number of goals scored.
(C) Champions; (R) Relegated

==== Results summary ====
Overall								Home						Away					
Pld	W	D	L	GF	GA	GD	Pts	W	D	L	GF	GA	GD	W	D	L	GF	GA	GD
26	7	3	16	24	46	−22	24	6	2	5	12	15	−3	1	1	11	12	31	−19

Source: worldfootball.net

==== Results by round ====
Round	1	2	3	4	5	6	7	8	9	10	11	12	14	15	16	13	17	18	19	20	21	22	23	24	25	26
Ground	H	A	H	A	A	H	A	H	A	H	A	H	H	A	H	A	A	H	A	H	A	H	A	H	A	H
Result	D	L	W	L	L	W	L	W	L	L	L	W	W	L	D	L	L	L	L	L	D	W	W	L	L	L
Position	5	13	9	11	12	10	11	9	10	10	11	11	11	11	10	11	13	12	13	13	13	13	13	13	13	13
Points	1	1	3	3	3	5	5	7	7	7	7	9	11	11	12	12	12	12	12	12	13	15	17	17	17	17

Source: worldfootball.net
A = Away; H = Home; W = Win; D = Draw; L = Loss

==== Matches ====
Win Draw Loss

9 March 1980 1	West Adelaide	1–1	Newcastle KB United	Adelaide
	Honeyman 89'	Report	Trenter 48'	Stadium: Hindmarsh Stadium; Attendance: 3,720; Referee: Barry Wilkinson

16 March 1980 2	Heidelberg United	4–2	West Adelaide	Melbourne
	Cole 4', 9', 11'; Paton 35'	Report	Atsalas 57'; Kosmina 75'	Stadium: Olympic Park; Attendance: 4,185; Referee: Chris Bambridge

23 March 1980 3	West Adelaide	1–0	South Melbourne	Adelaide
	Koulianos 68'	Report		Stadium: Hindmarsh Stadium; Attendance: 4,200; Referee: Tim Davies

30 March 1980 4	Brisbane Lions	2–1	West Adelaide	Brisbane
	Millman 9'; Verweij 78'	Report	Honeyman 59'	Stadium: Lions Stadium; Attendance: 1,500; Referee: Col Amos

6 April 1980 5	Sydney City	7–0	West Adelaide	Sydney
	Stevenson 10', 70'; Barnes 30', 46', 55'; Smith 35'; Souness 83'	Report		Stadium: ES Marks Athletics Field; Attendance: 3,174; Referee: Peter Rampley

13 April 1980 6	West Adelaide	4–2	Blacktown City	Adelaide
	Stowell 17' (o.g.); Kosmina 46'; Bozanic 60'; Manecas 71'	Report	Hunter 32'; Izatt 61'	Stadium: Hindmarsh Stadium; Attendance: 3,100; Referee: Dennis Stanley

20 April 1980 7	APIA Leichhardt	2–0	West Adelaide	Sydney
	O'Connor 7'; Samuels 75'	Report		Stadium: Lambert Park; Attendance: 2,682; Referee: Henry Witschge

27 April 1980 8	West Adelaide	1–0	Brisbane City	Adelaide
14:30 ACST	Norris 54'	Report		Stadium: Hindmarsh Stadium; Attendance: 2,900; Referee: Bobby Kerr

4 May 1980 9	Canberra City	4–3	West Adelaide	Canberra
15:00 AEST	Giampaolo 15'; O'Shea 43'; Valeri 52', 69' (pen.)	Report	Kosmina 14'; Topaz 36'; Key 56'	Stadium: Bruce Stadium; Attendance: 3,850; Referee: Bob Mee

11 May 1980 10	West Adelaide	0–2	Footscray JUST	Adelaide
		Report	Vasic 56'; Hazabent 78'	Stadium: Hindmarsh Stadium; Attendance: 2,450; Referee: Don Campbell

18 May 1980 11	Adelaide City	1–0	West Adelaide	Adelaide
	Barnes 63'	Report		Stadium: Olympic Sports Field; Attendance: 8,300; Referee: Stewart Mellings

25 May 1980 12	West Adelaide	1–0	St George-Budapest	Adelaide
	Kosmina 41'	Report		Stadium: Hindmarsh Stadium; Attendance: 3,100; Referee: Graham Neal

8 June 1980 14	West Adelaide	1–0	Heidelberg United	Adelaide
	Manecas 73'	Report		Stadium: Hindmarsh Stadium; Attendance: 3,654; Referee: Tony Boskovic

14 June 1980 15	Newcastle KB United	2–0	West Adelaide	Newcastle
	Burrows 53'; McClelland 89'	Report		Stadium: Newcastle International Sports Centre; Attendance: 4,429; Referee: Richard Lorenc

22 June 1980 16	West Adelaide	1–1	Brisbane Lions	Adelaide
	Honeyman 9'	Report	McGregor 3'	Stadium: Hindmarsh Stadium; Attendance: 2,789; Referee: Bobby Kerr

29 June 1980 13	Marconi Fairfield	2–1	West Adelaide	Sydney
15:00 AEST	Jankovics 60'; Byrne 81' (pen.)	Report	Manecas 57'	Stadium: Marconi Oval; Attendance: 3,275; Referee: Dave Nugent

13 July 1980 17	South Melbourne	2–0	West Adelaide	Melbourne
	Buljevic 63', 64'	Report		Stadium: Middle Park Soccer Stadium; Attendance: 5,000; Referee: Peter Rampley

20 July 1980 18	West Adelaide	0–2	Sydney City	Adelaide
		Report	Stevenson 63'; Barnes 81'	Stadium: Hindmarsh Stadium; Attendance: 2,900; Referee: Chris Bambridge

27 July 1980 19	Blacktown City	1–0	West Adelaide	Sydney
15:00 AEST	Fisher 77'	Report		Stadium: Gabbie Stadium; Attendance: 2,376; Referee: Tony Boskovic

10 August 1980 20	West Adelaide	0–4	APIA Leichhardt	Adelaide
		Report	Pirie 19'; O'Connor 26', 85'; Morsello 83'	Stadium: Hindmarsh Stadium; Attendance: 3,300; Referee: Tim Davies

17 August 1980 21	Brisbane City	1–1	West Adelaide	Brisbane
	Ratcliffe 86'	Report	Manecas 71'	Stadium: Perry Park; Attendance: 2,563; Referee: Henry Witschge

31 August 1980 22	West Adelaide	2–0	Canberra City	Adelaide
	Tymczyszyn 53' (pen>); Manecas 89'	Report		Stadium: Hindmarsh Stadium; Attendance: 3,824; Referee: Don Campbell

7 September 1980 23	Footscray JUST	0–3	West Adelaide	Melbourne
		Report	Forde 16'; McGachey 59'; Kosmina 70'	Stadium: Western Oval; Attendance: 1,200; Referee: Dave Nugent

14 September 1980 24	West Adelaide	0–2	Adelaide City	Adelaide
		Report	Muniz 5'; Barnes 79'	Stadium: Hindmarsh Stadium; Attendance: 5,650; Referee: Chris Bambridge

21 September 1980 25	St George-Budapest	3–1	West Adelaide	Sydney
	Duarte 65', 77', 82'	Report	Manecas 83'	Stadium: St George Stadium; Attendance: 1,638; Referee: Jack Johnston

28 September 1980 26	West Adelaide	0–1	Marconi Fairfield	Adelaide
		Report	Sharne 52'	Stadium: Hindmarsh Stadium; Attendance: 3,600; Referee: Ken Allen

=== NSL Cup ===
Win Draw Loss

25 April 1980 First round	Spearwood Dalmatinac (Western Australia)	3–1	West Adelaide	Perth
	Flamengo 45' (pen.), 61'; Popovich ?'	Report	Kosmina 24' (pen.)	Stadium: Dalmatinac Park; Attendance: Referee: Eddie Evans

== Statistics ==
=== Appearances and goals ===
Includes all competitions. Players with no appearances not included in the list.

No.	Pos.	Nat.	Player	National Soccer League		NSL Cup		Total	
No.	Pos.	Nat.	Player	Apps	Goals	Apps	Goals	Apps	Goals
1	GK	(Australia)	Martyn Crook	25	0	1	0	26	0
2	DF	(Socialist Federal Republic of Yugoslavia)	Zoran Maricic	16+2	0	1	0	19	0
3	DF	(Australia)	Vic Bozanic	26	1	0	0	26	1
4	MF	(Scotland)	Neil McGachey	6	1	0	0	6	1
5	DF	(Israel)	Shraga Topaz	22+1	1	0	0	23	1
6	DF	(Scotland)	Ian McKie	11+2	0	0	0	13	0
7	—	(Australia)	Chris Key	3+2	1	0	0	5	1
8	FW	(Angola)	Lopez Manecas	24	6	1	0	25	6
9	FW	(Australia)	John Kosmina	23	5	1	1	24	6
10	FW	(Scotland)	Graham Honeyman	26	3	1	0	27	3
11	MF	(Scotland)	Ian McGregor	24+1	0	0	0	25	0
12	FW	(South Africa)	Graham Norris	18	1	1	0	19	1
13	FW	(Australia)	George Koulianos	6+2	1	1	0	9	1
14	—	(Australia)	Tom Forde	16	1	0	0	16	1
15	DF	(England)	Peter Tymczyszyn	10+2	1	0	0	12	1
16	MF	(Australia)	Steve Atsalas	4+3	1	0	0	7	1
17	DF	(Australia)	Tom Totsikas	3+1	0	0	0	4	0
18	MF	(Australia)	David Doorne	2+2	0	0	0	4	0
19	DF	(Scotland)	Eric Carruthers	16+2	0	0	0	18	0
20	GK	(Australia)	Brian Gale	1	0	0	0	1	0
—	FW	(Australia)	Peter Boyle	1	0	0	0	1	0
—	—	(Australia)	Aldo Lorenzoni	1+2	0	0	0	3	0
—	DF	(Australia)	Nick Pantzaras	2	0	0	0	2	0

=== Disciplinary record ===
Includes all competitions. The list is sorted by squad number when total cards are equal. Players with no cards not included in the list.

Rank	No.	Pos.	Nat.	Player	National Soccer League			NSL Cup			Total		
Rank	No.	Pos.	Nat.	Player	Yellow card	Second yellow card	Red card	Yellow card	Second yellow card	Red card	Yellow card	Second yellow card	Red card
1	12	FW	(South Africa)	Graham Norris	4	0	1	0	0	0	4	0	1
2	4	MF	(Australia)	Neil McGachey	3	0	1	0	0	0	3	0	1
3	9	FW	(Australia)	John Kosmina	1	0	1	0	0	0	1	0	1
4	2	DF	(Australia)	Zoran Maricic	3	0	0	0	0	0	3	0	0
5	5	DF	(Israel)	Shraga Topaz	2	0	0	0	0	0	2	0	0
5	11	MF	(Scotland)	Ian McGregor	2	0	0	0	0	0	2	0	0
5	19	DF	(Scotland)	Eric Carruthers	2	0	0	0	0	0	2	0	0
8	1	GK	(Australia)	Martyn Crook	1	0	0	0	0	0	1	0	0
8	8	FW	(Angola)	Lopez Manecas	1	0	0	0	0	0	1	0	0
8	10	FW	(Scotland)	Graham Honeyman	1	0	0	0	0	0	1	0	0
8	14	—	(Australia)	Tom Forde	1	0	0	0	0	0	1	0	0
8	15	DF	(England)	Peter Tymczyszyn	1	0	0	0	0	0	1	0	0
Total					22	0	3	0	0	0	22	0	3

=== Clean sheets ===
Includes all competitions. The list is sorted by squad number when total clean sheets are equal. Numbers in parentheses represent games where both goalkeepers participated and both kept a clean sheet; the number in parentheses is awarded to the goalkeeper who was substituted on, whilst a full clean sheet is awarded to the goalkeeper who was on the field at the start of play. Goalkeepers with no clean sheets not included in the list.

Rank	No.	Nat.	Goalkeeper	NSL	NSL Cup	Total
1	1	(Australia)	Martyn Crook	6	0	6
Total				6	0	6
