= 1981 APIA Leichhardt FC season =

3rd season in existence of APIA Leichhardt FC in the National Soccer League

APIA Leichhardt
1981 season
- Manager: Willie Wallace
- Stadium: Lambert Park; Everley Park; Sydney Sports Ground; St George Stadium; Leichhardt Oval
- National Soccer League: 4th
- NSL Cup: Quarter-finals
- Top goalscorer: League: Marshall Soper (12); All: Marshall Soper (16)
- Highest home attendance: 7,821 vs. Sydney Olympic (6 September 1981); National Soccer League
- Lowest home attendance: 2,651 vs. Brisbane Lions (1 March 1981); National Soccer League
- Average home league attendance: 4,193
- Biggest win: 4–0 vs. Canberra City (H) (23 August 1981); National Soccer League
- Biggest defeat: 1–4 vs. Newcastle KB United (A) (28 June 1981); National Soccer League; 1–4 vs. South Melbourne (A) (19 July 1981); National Soccer League; 0–3 vs. Sydney City (A) (16 August 1981); National Soccer League

The 1981 season was the third in the National Soccer League for APIA Leichhardt Football Club. In addition to the domestic league, they also participated in the NSL Cup. APIA Leichhardt finished 4th in their National Soccer League season, and were eliminated in the quarter-finals of the NSL Cup.

== Players ==
Note: Flags indicate national team as defined under FIFA eligibility rules; some limited exceptions apply. Players may hold more than one non-FIFA nationality.

No.	Pos.	Nation	Player
1	GK	AUS	Greg Woodhouse
2	DF	AUS	Rod Skellern
3	DF	AUS	Col McAusland
4	DF	AUS	Mark Pullen
5	DF	AUS	Peter Wilson
6	MF	SCO	Alan Hughes
7	FW	AUS	Marshall Soper
8	FW	AUS	Sebastian Giampaolo
9	FW	SCO	Billy Pirie
10	MF	AUS	Zdenko Kafka
11	FW	AUS	Phil O'Connor
12	FW	AUS	Tony Morsello

No.	Pos.	Nation	Player
13	FW	SCO	John Bradley
14	FW	AUS	Frank Leyden
15	FW	SCO	John McKie
16	DF	AUS	David Watt
17		AUS	Frank Casacchia
18	MF	AUS	Ian Gray
19		AUS	Frank Zaccomer
20	GK	AUS	Bob Parks
—	MF	AUS	Terry Butler
—	DF	AUS	Paul Carter
—	FW	AUS	John Coyne
—	MF	AUS	Dave Harding

== Competitions ==
=== Overall record ===
Competition	First match	Last match	Starting round	Final position	Record							
Competition	First match	Last match	Starting round	Final position	Pld	W	D	L	GF	GA	GD	Win %
National Soccer League	15 February 1981	13 September 1981	Matchday 1	4th	30	12	11	7	39	33	+6	40.00
NSL Cup	29 March 1981	8 July 1981	First round	Quarter-finals	4	3	0	1	10	8	+2	75.00
Total					34	15	11	8	49	41	+8	44.12

Source: Competitions

=== National Soccer League ===
==== League table ====
Pos	Team	Pld	W	D	L	GF	GA	GD	Pts	Relegation
1	Sydney City (C)	30	19	5	6	59	30	+29	43	
2	South Melbourne	30	13	13	4	41	27	+14	39	
3	Brisbane City	30	12	11	7	37	25	+12	35	
4	APIA Leichhardt	30	12	11	7	39	33	+6	35	
5	Canberra City	30	13	7	10	41	32	+9	33	
6	Brisbane Lions	30	11	11	8	41	33	+8	33	
7	Adelaide City	30	13	6	11	46	42	+4	32	
8	Heidelberg United	30	12	7	11	48	40	+8	31	
9	Sydney Olympic	30	11	9	10	46	46	0	31	
10	Newcastle KB United	30	11	8	11	41	41	0	30	
11	Wollongong City	30	8	12	10	35	39	−4	28	
12	Preston Makedonia	30	9	7	14	39	41	−2	25	
13	Footscray JUST	30	9	7	14	32	48	−16	25	
14	Marconi Fairfield	30	9	7	14	23	45	−22	25	
15	Blacktown City (R)	30	6	9	15	32	47	−15	21	Relegated to the 1982 NSW State League
16	West Adelaide	30	5	4	21	26	57	−31	14	

Updated to match(es) played on unknown. Source: rsssf.com
Rules for classification: 1) points; 2) goal difference; 3) number of goals scored.
(C) Champions; (R) Relegated

==== Results summary ====
Overall								Home						Away					
Pld	W	D	L	GF	GA	GD	Pts	W	D	L	GF	GA	GD	W	D	L	GF	GA	GD
30	12	11	7	39	33	+6	47	7	7	1	25	13	+12	5	4	6	14	20	−6

Source: worldfootball.net

==== Results by round ====
Round	1	2	3	4	5	6	7	8	9	11	12	13	15	10	16	17	18	19	20	21	22	23	24	25	26	27	28	29	14	30
Ground	H	A	H	A	H	A	A	H	A	A	H	A	A	H	H	A	H	A	H	H	A	H	A	H	A	H	A	H	H	A
Result	D	L	D	W	W	W	D	D	L	D	L	W	W	W	W	D	W	L	W	W	L	D	D	D	L	W	W	D	D	L
Position	7	10	10	9	8	6	6	6	8	6	7	6	4	5	3	5	4	4	4	3	3	3	3	4	6	4	3	3	5	4
Points	1	1	2	4	6	8	9	10	10	11	11	13	15	17	19	20	22	22	24	26	26	27	28	29	29	31	33	34	35	35

Source: worldfootball.net
A = Away; H = Home; W = Win; D = Draw; L = Loss

==== Matches ====
Win Draw Loss

15 February 1981 1	APIA Leichhardt	2–2	Heidelberg United	Sydney
	Hughes 13', 89'	Report	Cole 25' (pen.); Bozikas 86'	Stadium: Lambert Park; Attendance: 4,025; Referee: Peter Rampley

22 February 1981 2	Footscray JUST	2–1	APIA Leichhardt	Melbourne
	Kondarios 15'; Vasic 44'	Report	O'Connor 24'	Stadium: Schintler Reserve; Attendance: 1,951; Referee: Stewart Mellings

1 March 1981 3	APIA Leichhardt	0–0	Brisbane Lions	Sydney
15:00 AEST		Report		Stadium: Lambert Park; Attendance: 2,651; Referee: Richard Lorenc

8 March 1981 4	Blacktown City	0–1	APIA Leichhardt	Sydney
		Report	O'Connor 15'	Stadium: Gabbie Stadium; Attendance: 2,543; Referee: Ken Small

15 March 1981 5	APIA Leichhardt	2–1	Newcastle KB United	Sydney
15:00 AEST	O'Connor 75'; Soper 84'	Report	Bertogna 38'	Stadium: Lambert Park; Attendance: 4,281; Referee: Bob Mee

29 March 1981 6	West Adelaide	1–2	APIA Leichhardt	Adelaide
	Brown 19'	Report	Giampaolo 8'; O'Connor 69'	Stadium: Hindmarsh Stadium; Attendance: 4,500; Referee: Don Campbell

5 April 1981 7	Wollongong City	1–1	APIA Leichhardt	Wollongong
15:00 AEST	Tredinnick 30'	Report	Kafka 5'	Stadium: Wollongong Showground; Attendance: 6,087; Referee: Gary Power

12 April 1981 8	APIA Leichhardt	1–1	South Melbourne	Sydney
15:00 AEST	O'Connor 56'	Report	Evans 75'	Stadium: Lambert Park; Attendance: 4,382; Referee: Peter Rampley

19 April 1981 9	Preston Makedonia	3–1	APIA Leichhardt	Melbourne
	Higham 11'; Ollerton 30'; Brown 53'	Report	Giampaolo 19'	Stadium: B.T. Connor Reserve; Attendance: 3,500; Referee: Stewart Mellings

3 May 1981 11	Brisbane City	0–0	APIA Leichhardt	Brisbane
		Report		Stadium: Spencer Park; Attendance: 2,500; Referee: Jack Wood

10 May 1981 12	APIA Leichhardt	0–1	Sydney City	Sydney
15:00 AEST		Report	Souness 78'	Stadium: Lambert Park; Attendance: 4,284; Referee: Bob Mee

17 May 1981 13	Canberra City	0–1	APIA Leichhardt	Canberra
		Report	Morsello 59'	Stadium: Bruce Stadium; Attendance: 4,676; Referee: Evan Venios

31 May 1981 15	Sydney Olympic	1–3	APIA Leichhardt	Sydney
	P. Wilson 79' (o.g.)	Report	Kafka 32'; Morsello 59'; Pirie 90'	Stadium: Pratten Park; Attendance: 5,378; Referee: Gary Power

3 June 1981 10	APIA Leichhardt	3–0	Adelaide City	Sydney
	Soper 65', 90'; Bradley 80'	Report		Stadium: Lambert Park; Attendance: 3,500; Referee: Jim Reeves

7 June 1981 16	APIA Leichhardt	2–0	Footscray JUST	Sydney
15:00 AEST	Wilson 84'; Soper 86'	Report		Stadium: Lambert Park; Attendance: 3,482; Referee: Alf Rodway

14 June 1981 17	Brisbane Lions	0–0	APIA Leichhardt	Brisbane
		Report		Stadium: Richlands Stadium; Attendance: 2,000; Referee: Jim Reeves

21 June 1981 18	APIA Leichhardt	3–2	Blacktown City	Sydney
	Bradley 13'; Hughes 25'; O'Connor 35'	Report	Djordjevic 43'; Turner 56' (pen.)	Stadium: Lambert Park; Attendance: 4,096; Referee: Jim Reeves

28 June 1981 19	Newcastle KB United	4–1	APIA Leichhardt	Newcastle
	Channon 10'; Sumner 15'; Mountford 23'; Heys 83'	Report	Soper 70'	Stadium: Newcastle International Sports Centre; Attendance: 6,850; Referee: Evan Venios

5 July 1981 20	APIA Leichhardt	1–0	West Adelaide	Sydney
15:00 AEST	Soper 69'	Report		Stadium: Lambert Park; Attendance: 3,872; Referee: Tony Boskovic

12 July 1981 21	APIA Leichhardt	1–0	Wollongong City	Sydney
	Butler 14'	Report		Stadium: Lambert Park; Attendance: 4,222; Referee: Peter Rampley

19 July 1981 22	South Melbourne	4–1	APIA Leichhardt	Melbourne
	Wooddin 29'; Evans 30', 41', 65'	Report	Butler 73'	Stadium: Middle Park Soccer Stadium; Attendance: 6,000; Referee: Stewart Mellings

26 July 1981 23	APIA Leichhardt	1–1	Preston Makedonia	Sydney
	Soper 75'	Report	Lucchesi 40'	Stadium: Lambert Park; Attendance: 4,111; Referee: Jim Reeves

2 August 1981 24	Adelaide City	0–0	APIA Leichhardt	Adelaide
		Report		Stadium: Olympic Sports Field; Attendance: 3,100; Referee: Chris Bambridge

9 August 1981 25	APIA Leichhardt	2–2	Brisbane City	Sydney
	Soper 15'; Kafka 37'	Report	Hamilton 58'; Gaffney 84'	Stadium: Lambert Park; Attendance: 4,301; Referee: Gary Power

16 August 1981 26	Sydney City	3–0	APIA Leichhardt	Sydney
	Kosmina 16'; Boden 81'; Watson 90'	Report		Stadium: ES Marks Athletics Field; Attendance: 4,216; Referee: Jim Reeves

23 August 1981 27	APIA Leichhardt	4–0	Canberra City	Sydney
15:00 AEST	Morsello 25'; Giampaolo 31'; Bradley 41'; Soper 60'	Report		Stadium: Lambert Park; Attendance: 3,614; Referee: Don Campbell

30 August 1981 28	Marconi Fairfield	0–2	APIA Leichhardt	Sydney
15:00 AEST		Report	Soper 23', 74'	Stadium: Marconi Stadium; Attendance: 5,325; Referee: Tim Davies

6 September 1981 29	APIA Leichhardt	2–2	Sydney Olympic	Sydney
	O'Connor 17'; Giampaolo 69'	Report	Cross 3'; Katholos 84'	Stadium: Lambert Park; Attendance: 7,821; Referee: Peter Rampley

9 September 1981 14	APIA Leichhardt	1–1	Marconi Fairfield	Sydney
	Soper 20'	Report	Mariani 75'	Stadium: Leichhardt Oval; Attendance: 4,248; Referee: Stewart Mellings

13 September 1981 30	Heidelberg United	1–0	APIA Leichhardt	Melbourne
	Cole 16'	Report		Stadium: Olympic Park No. 2 Attendance: 2,000; Referee: Chris Bambridge

=== NSL Cup ===
Win Draw Loss

29 March 1981 First round	APIA Leichhardt	3–2	(New South Wales) Auburn	Sydney
	Morsello 19'; O'Connor 31'; Soper 76'	Report	Allen 1'; Hill 51'	Stadium: Everley Park; Attendance: Referee: Richard Lorenc

6 May 1981 Second round	Wollongong City	2–4 (a.e.t.)	APIA Leichhardt	Wollongong
	McBreen 77'; Tredinnick 90'	Report	O'Connor 75'; Soper 89', 119'; Kafka 100'	Stadium: Woonona Oval; Referee: Tony Boskovic

16 June 1981 Third round	APIA Leichhardt	2–1	Sydney Olympic	Sydney
	O'Connor 35'; Soper 72'	Report	Cotton 78'	Stadium: Sydney Sports Ground; Attendance: 5,765; Referee: Chris Bambridge

8 July 1981 Quarter-finals	APIA Leichhardt	1–3	Marconi Fairfield	Sydney
	Morsello 65'	Report	Krncevic 12', 63', 89'	Stadium: St George Stadium; Attendance: 3,800; Referee: Henry Witschge

== Statistics ==
=== Appearances and goals ===
Includes all competitions. Players with no appearances not included in the list.

No.	Pos.	Nat.	Player	National Soccer League		NSL Cup		Total	
No.	Pos.	Nat.	Player	Apps	Goals	Apps	Goals	Apps	Goals
1	GK	(Australia)	Greg Woodhouse	28	0	4	0	32	0
2	DF	(Australia)	Rod Skellern	20	0	3	0	23	0
3	DF	(Australia)	Col McAusland	27+1	0	3	0	31	0
4	DF	(Australia)	Mark Pullen	24	0	2	0	26	0
5	DF	(Australia)	Peter Wilson	29	1	4	0	33	1
6	MF	(Scotland)	Alan Hughes	22	3	4	0	26	3
7	FW	(Australia)	Marshall Soper	21+4	12	4	4	29	16
8	FW	(Australia)	Sebastian Giampaolo	11+2	4	0	0	13	4
9	FW	(Scotland)	Billy Pirie	5+3	1	1	0	9	1
10	MF	(Australia)	Zdenko Kafka	26	3	4	1	30	4
11	FW	(Australia)	Phil O'Connor	26	7	4	3	30	10
12	FW	(Australia)	Tony Morsello	17+6	3	3+1	2	27	5
13	FW	(Scotland)	John Bradley	11+2	3	2	0	15	3
14	FW	(Australia)	Frank Leyden	8	0	1	0	9	0
15	FW	(Scotland)	John McKie	1+2	0	0	0	3	0
16	DF	(Australia)	David Watt	1+2	0	0	0	3	0
17	—	(Australia)	Frank Casacchia	4+2	0	1	0	7	0
18	MF	(Australia)	Ian Gray	11+4	0	2	0	17	0
19	—	(Australia)	Frank Zaccomer	5	0	1	0	6	0
20	GK	(Australia)	Bob Parks	2	0	0	0	2	0
—	MF	(Australia)	Terry Butler	14	2	1	0	15	2
—	DF	(Australia)	Paul Carter	3	0	0	0	3	0
—	FW	(Australia)	John Coyne	12+3	0	1+1	0	17	0
—	MF	(Australia)	Dave Harding	2	0	0	0	2	0
Player(s) transferred out but featured this season
—	DF	(Scotland)	Ian McKie	0+1	0	0	0	1	0

=== Disciplinary record ===
Includes all competitions. The list is sorted by squad number when total cards are equal. Players with no cards not included in the list.

Rank	No.	Pos.	Nat.	Player	National Soccer League			NSL Cup			Total		
Rank	No.	Pos.	Nat.	Player	Yellow card	Second yellow card	Red card	Yellow card	Second yellow card	Red card	Yellow card	Second yellow card	Red card
1	2	DF	(Australia)	Rod Skellern	3	0	1	0	0	0	3	0	1
2	4	DF	(Australia)	Mark Pullen	5	0	0	0	0	0	5	0	0
2	5	DF	(Australia)	Peter Wilson	5	0	0	0	0	0	5	0	0
4	6	MF	(Scotland)	Alan Hughes	4	0	0	0	0	0	4	0	0
4	10	MF	(Australia)	Zdenko Kafka	4	0	0	0	0	0	4	0	0
4	—	MF	(Australia)	Terry Butler	4	0	0	0	0	0	4	0	0
7	7	FW	(Australia)	Marshall Soper	3	0	0	0	0	0	3	0	0
8	12	FW	(Australia)	Tony Morsello	2	0	0	0	0	0	2	0	0
9	8	FW	(Australia)	Sebastian Giampaolo	1	0	0	0	0	0	1	0	0
9	—	FW	(Australia)	John Coyne	1	0	0	0	0	0	1	0	0
Total					32	0	1	0	0	0	32	0	1

=== Clean sheets ===
Includes all competitions. The list is sorted by squad number when total clean sheets are equal. Numbers in parentheses represent games where both goalkeepers participated and both kept a clean sheet; the number in parentheses is awarded to the goalkeeper who was substituted on, whilst a full clean sheet is awarded to the goalkeeper who was on the field at the start of play. Goalkeepers with no clean sheets not included in the list.

Rank	No.	Nat.	Goalkeeper	NSL	NSL Cup	Total
1	1	(Australia)	Greg Woodhouse	10	0	10
2	20	(Australia)	Bob Parks	2	0	2
Total				12	0	12
