= 1979 West Adelaide SC season =

West Adelaide
1979 season
- Head Coach: Tommy Forde
- Stadium: Hindmarsh Stadium
- National Soccer League: 7th
- NSL Cup: First round
- Top goalscorer: League: John Kosmina; Graham Norris (7 each); All: John Kosmina; Graham Norris (7 each)
- Highest home attendance: 11,127 vs. Adelaide City (10 June 1979); National Soccer League
- Lowest home attendance: 2,500 vs. Sydney City (5 August 1979); National Soccer League
- Average home league attendance: 4,858
- Biggest win: 5–0 vs. Footscray JUST (H) (13 May 1979); National Soccer League
- Biggest defeat: 0–3 vs. Sydney City (A) (22 April 1979); National Soccer League

The 1979 season was the third in the National Soccer League for West Adelaide Soccer Club. In addition to the domestic league, they also participated in the NSL Cup. West Adelaide finished 7th in their National Soccer League season, and were eliminated in the first round of the NSL Cup.

== Players ==
Note: Flags indicate national team as defined under FIFA eligibility rules; some limited exceptions apply. Players may hold more than one non-FIFA nationality.

No.	Pos.	Nation	Player
1	GK	AUS	Martyn Crook
2	DF	AUS	Vic Bozanic
3	DF	AUS	Barry Reynolds
4	MF	SCO	Neil McGachey
5	DF	GRE	Con Kambas
6	DF	AUS	David Jones
7	FW	AUS	Peter Boyle
8	FW	AUS	Dave Pillans
9	FW	RSA	Graham Norris
10	FW	SCO	Graham Honeyman
11	MF	SCO	Ian McGregor

No.	Pos.	Nation	Player
12	FW	AUS	Alex Zervas
13	MF	MAS	Gary Dooley
14		AUS	Marcelino Fernandez
15	DF	ENG	Peter Tymczyszyn
16	FW	AUS	George Koulianos
17	DF	AUS	Nick Pantzaras
18	MF	AUS	John Batchelor
19	FW	AUS	John Kosmina
21	GK	IRL	Sam Service
—	MF	SCO	Gordon McCulloch
—	GK	AUS	Louis Pivetta

== Competitions ==
=== Overall record ===
Competition	First match	Last match	Starting round	Final position	Record							
Competition	First match	Last match	Starting round	Final position	Pld	W	D	L	GF	GA	GD	Win %
National Soccer League	9 March 1979	23 September 1979	Matchday 1	7th	26	10	4	12	28	31	−3	38.46
NSL Cup	25 April 1979		First round	First round	1	0	0	1	0	1	−1	0.00
Total					27	10	4	13	28	32	−4	37.04

Source: Competitions

=== National Soccer League ===
==== League table ====
Pos	Team	Pld	W	D	L	GF	GA	GD	Pts	Qualification or relegation
1	Marconi Fairfield (C)	26	15	6	5	58	32	+26	40 (Note: A Bonus Point was awarded for victories of 4 goals or more.)	Qualification to Finals series (Note: The Finals series was not considered the championship for the 1979 National Soccer League.)
2	Heidelberg United	26	14	7	5	44	30	+14	36	Qualification to Finals series
3	Sydney City	26	15	3	8	47	29	+18	34	Qualification to Finals series
4	Brisbane City	26	14	5	7	38	30	+8	34	Qualification to Finals series
5	Adelaide City	26	13	6	7	43	27	+16	33	
6	Newcastle KB United	26	11	9	6	43	30	+13	32	
7	West Adelaide	26	10	4	12	28	31	−3	25	
8	APIA Leichhardt	26	11	3	12	29	37	−8	25	
9	Brisbane Lions	26	8	6	12	28	40	−12	22	
10	Footscray JUST	26	8	3	15	29	43	−14	20	
11	St George-Budapest	26	7	6	13	27	43	−16	20	
12	Canberra City	26	6	8	12	25	41	−16	20	
13	Sydney Olympic (R)	26	7	5	14	23	30	−7	19	Relegated to the 1980 NSW State League
14	South Melbourne	26	6	3	17	26	45	−19	16	

Updated to match(es) played on unknown. Source: rsssf.com
Rules for classification: 1) points; 2) goal difference; 3) number of goals scored.
(C) Champions; (R) Relegated

==== Results summary ====
Overall								Home						Away					
Pld	W	D	L	GF	GA	GD	Pts	W	D	L	GF	GA	GD	W	D	L	GF	GA	GD
26	10	4	12	28	31	−3	34	6	2	5	17	11	+6	4	2	7	11	20	−9

Source: worldfootball.net

==== Results by round ====
Round	1	2	3	4	5	6	7	8	9	10	11	12	13	14	15	16	17	18	19	20	21	22	23	24	25	26
Ground	A	H	A	H	A	H	A	H	A	H	A	H	H	A	H	A	H	H	A	H	A	H	A	H	A	A
Result	W	D	L	W	D	W	L	L	L	W	W	L	W	D	W	L	D	W	W	L	L	L	W	L	L	L
Position	3	5	7	6	5	4	5	8	9	8	6	8	7	7	6	7	7	7	6	7	7	7	7	7	7	7
Points	2	3	3	5	6	8	8	8	8	11	13	13	15	15	17	17	18	20	22	22	22	23	24	25	25	25

Source: worldfootball.net
A = Away; H = Home; W = Win; D = Draw; L = Loss

==== Matches ====
Win Draw Loss

9 March 1979 1	APIA Leichhardt	0–1	West Adelaide	Sydney
		Report	McCulloch 37'	Stadium: Marconi Oval; Attendance: 5,723; Referee: Tony Boskovic

18 March 1979 2	West Adelaide	1–1	Newcastle KB United	Adelaide
14:30 ACDT	Pillans 80'	Report	Sneddon 88'	Stadium: Hindmarsh Stadium; Attendance: 6,127; Referee: Graham Neale

25 March 1979 3	Sydney Olympic	2–0	West Adelaide	Sydney
	Eaton 36'; McIntosh 52'	Report		Stadium: St George Stadium; Attendance: 2,731; Referee: Peter Rampley

1 April 1979 4	West Adelaide	1–0	Heidelberg United	Adelaide
	Boyle 27'	Report		Stadium: Hindmarsh Stadium; Attendance: 5,230; Referee: Don Campbell

7 April 1979 5	Canberra City	0–0	West Adelaide	Canberra
		Report		Stadium: Bruce Stadium; Attendance: 5,300; Referee: Jack Wood

15 April 1979 6	West Adelaide	1–0	Brisbane Lions	Adelaide
	Pillans 49'	Report		Stadium: Hindmarsh Stadium; Attendance: 5,260; Referee: Barry Harwood

22 April 1979 7	Sydney City	3–0	West Adelaide	Sydney
	Watson 9'; Smith 42', 84'	Report		Stadium: Wentworth Park; Attendance: 1,891; Referee: Peter Rampley

29 April 1979 8	West Adelaide	1–2	Marconi Fairfield	Adelaide
	Kambas 37'	Report	Lindsay 9'; Krncevic 11'	Stadium: Hindmarsh Stadium; Attendance: 7,800; Referee: Don Campbell

6 May 1979 9	St George-Budapest	2–0	West Adelaide	Sydney
	J. O'Shea 19'; O'Connor 23'	Report		Stadium: St George Stadium; Attendance: 1,815; Referee: Tim Davies

13 May 1979 10	West Adelaide	5–0	Footscray JUST	Adelaide
	Norris 49', 78'; Boyle 59'; Kosmina 60'; Jones 83'	Report		Stadium: Hindmarsh Stadium; Attendance: 4,200; Referee: Graham Neal

3 June 1979 11	South Melbourne	3–4	West Adelaide	Melbourne
	Evans 21', 79'; Davidson 83'	Report	Kosmina 14', 88'; Norris 54', 72'	Stadium: Middle Park Soccer Stadium; Attendance: 7,000; Referee: Tim Davies

10 June 1979 12	West Adelaide	1–2	Adelaide City	Adelaide
	Pillans 9'	Report	Northcote 35'; Marwe 84'	Stadium: Hindmarsh Stadium; Attendance: 11,127; Referee: Tony Beazleigh

17 June 1979 13	West Adelaide	2–1	Brisbane City	Adelaide
	Kosmina 63'; Kambas 82'	Report	Coyne 4'	Stadium: Hindmarsh Stadium; Attendance: 4,600; Referee: Graham Neal

23 June 1979 14	Newcastle KB United	0–0	West Adelaide	Newcastle
14:30 AEST		Report		Stadium: Newcastle International Sports Centre; Attendance: 8,687; Referee: Des Miles

1 July 1979 15	West Adelaide	3–1	APIA Leichhardt	Adelaide
	Kosmina 17'; Boyle 29'; Norris 73'	Report	Roberts 87'	Stadium: Hindmarsh Stadium; Attendance: 3,800; Referee: Stewart Mellings

8 July 1979 16	Heidelberg United	3–1	West Adelaide	Melbourne
	Buljevic 26'; Taylor 69'; Cole 84'	Report	Kosmina 60'	Stadium: Olympic Park; Attendance: 4,500; Referee: Tony Boskovic

15 July 1979 17	West Adelaide	0–0	Sydney Olympic	Adelaide
		Report		Stadium: Hindmarsh Stadium; Attendance: 4,200; Referee: Don Campbell

22 July 1979 18	West Adelaide	2–0	Canberra City	Adelaide
	Norris 57'; Tymczyszyn 67'	Report		Stadium: Hindmarsh Stadium; Attendance: 2,700; Referee: Chris Bambridge

29 July 1979 19	Brisbane Lions	2–3	West Adelaide	Brisbane
	Brennan 23'; Dooley 71' (o.g.)	Report	Norris 5'; Batchelor 77'; Kosmina 88'	Stadium: Perry Park; Attendance: 800; Referee: Ken Allen

5 August 1979 20	West Adelaide	0–2	Sydney City	Adelaide
		Report	Tymczyszyn 16' (o.g.); Stevenson 81'	Stadium: Hindmarsh Stadium; Attendance: 2,500; Referee: Stewart Mellings

12 August 1979 21	Marconi Fairfield	2–1	West Adelaide	Sydney
	Vieri 41'; Sharne 58'	Report	Boyle 54'	Stadium: Marconi Oval; Attendance: 5,480; Referee: Tony Boskovic

26 August 1979 22	West Adelaide	0–1	St George-Budapest	Adelaide
		Report	Cotton 35'	Stadium: Hindmarsh Stadium; Attendance: 2,512; Referee: Don Campbell

1 September 1979 23	Footscray JUST	0–1	West Adelaide	Melbourne
		Report	McGregor 84'	Stadium: Middle Park Soccer Stadium; Attendance: 1,200; Referee: Tony Beazleigh

9 September 1979 24	West Adelaide	0–1	South Melbourne	Adelaide
		Report	Baxter 71' (pen.)	Stadium: Hindmarsh Stadium; Attendance: 3,100; Referee: Richard Lorenc

16 September 1979 25	Adelaide City	1–0	West Adelaide	Adelaide
	Northcote 86'	Report		Stadium: Olympic Sports Field; Attendance: 10,007; Referee: Tim Davies

23 September 1979 26	Brisbane City	2–0	West Adelaide	Brisbane
	Echeverria 55'; Campbell 89'	Report		Stadium: Perry Park; Attendance: 3,100; Referee: Tim Davies

=== NSL Cup ===
Win Draw Loss

25 April 1979 First round	Adelaide City	1–0	West Adelaide	Adelaide
	J. Nyskohus 88' (pen.)	Report		Stadium: Olympic Sports Field; Attendance: 8,123; Referee: Chris Bambridge

== Statistics ==
=== Appearances and goals ===
Includes all competitions. Players with no appearances not included in the list.

No.	Pos.	Nat.	Player	National Soccer League		NSL Cup		Total	
No.	Pos.	Nat.	Player	Apps	Goals	Apps	Goals	Apps	Goals
1	GK	(Australia)	Martyn Crook	25	0	1	0	26	0
2	DF	(Australia)	Vic Bozanic	14+1	0	1	0	16	0
3	DF	(Australia)	Barry Reynolds	18	0	1	0	19	0
4	MF	(Scotland)	Neil McGachey	7	0	1	0	8	0
5	DF	(Greece)	Con Kambas	22	2	1	0	23	2
6	DF	(Australia)	David Jones	26	1	1	0	27	1
7	FW	(Australia)	Peter Boyle	24	4	1	0	25	4
8	FW	(Australia)	Dave Pillans	11+1	3	1	0	13	3
9	FW	(South Africa)	Graham Norris	21+1	7	0	0	22	7
10	FW	(Scotland)	Graham Honeyman	22+1	0	1	0	24	0
11	MF	(Scotland)	Ian McGregor	17+5	0	1	0	23	0
12	FW	(Australia)	Alex Zervas	4+8	0	0	0	12	0
13	MF	(Malaysia)	Gary Dooley	14+1	0	0	0	15	0
14	—	(Australia)	Marcelino Fernandez	1+3	0	0	0	4	0
15	DF	(England)	Peter Tymczyszyn	21+1	1	0+1	0	23	1
16	FW	(Australia)	George Koulianos	1	0	0	0	1	0
17	DF	(Australia)	Nick Pantzaras	9+1	0	0	0	10	0
18	MF	(Australia)	John Batchelor	0+4	1	0	0	4	1
19	FW	(Australia)	John Kosmina	21	7	1	0	22	7
21	GK	(Republic of Ireland)	Sam Service	1+1	0	0	0	2	0
—	MF	(Scotland)	Gordon McCulloch	7+1	1	0	0	8	1
—	GK	(Australia)	Louis Pivetta	0+1	0	0	0	1	0

=== Disciplinary record ===
Includes all competitions. The list is sorted by squad number when total cards are equal. Players with no cards not included in the list.

Rank	No.	Pos.	Nat.	Player	National Soccer League			NSL Cup			Total		
Rank	No.	Pos.	Nat.	Player	Yellow card	Second yellow card	Red card	Yellow card	Second yellow card	Red card	Yellow card	Second yellow card	Red card
1	12	FW	(Australia)	Alex Zervas	2	0	1	0	0	0	2	0	1
2	5	DF	(Greece)	Con Kambas	4	0	0	0	0	0	4	0	0
2	9	FW	(South Africa)	Graham Norris	4	0	0	0	0	0	4	0	0
2	19	FW	(Australia)	John Kosmina	4	0	0	0	0	0	4	0	0
5	10	FW	(Scotland)	Graham Honeyman	2	0	0	0	0	0	2	0	0
5	11	MF	(Scotland)	Ian McGregor	2	0	0	0	0	0	2	0	0
7	3	DF	(Australia)	Barry Reynolds	1	0	0	0	0	0	1	0	0
7	4	MF	(Scotland)	Neil McGachey	1	0	0	0	0	0	1	0	0
7	6	DF	(Australia)	David Jones	1	0	0	0	0	0	1	0	0
7	7	FW	(Australia)	Peter Boyle	1	0	0	0	0	0	1	0	0
7	17	DF	(Australia)	Nick Pantzaras	1	0	0	0	0	0	1	0	0
7	—	MF	(Scotland)	Gordon McCulloch	1	0	0	0	0	0	1	0	0
Total					24	0	1	0	0	0	24	0	1

=== Clean sheets ===
Includes all competitions. The list is sorted by squad number when total clean sheets are equal. Numbers in parentheses represent games where both goalkeepers participated and both kept a clean sheet; the number in parentheses is awarded to the goalkeeper who was substituted on, whilst a full clean sheet is awarded to the goalkeeper who was on the field at the start of play. Goalkeepers with no clean sheets not included in the list.

Rank	No.	Nat.	Goalkeeper	NSL	NSL Cup	Total
1	1	(Australia)	Martyn Crook	8	0	8
Total				8	0	8
