= 1978 West Adelaide SC season =

West Adelaide
1978 season
- Head Coach: John Margaritis; Jim Adam
- Stadium: Hindmarsh Stadium
- National Soccer League: 1st
- NSL Cup: Second round
- Top goalscorer: League: Ian McGregor (7); All: Ian McGregor (8)
- Highest home attendance: 16,251 vs. Adelaide City (27 August 1978); National Soccer League
- Lowest home attendance: 4,300 vs. Brisbane City (23 July 1978); National Soccer League
- Average home league attendance: 6,742
- Biggest win: 3–0 vs. Brisbane Lions (H) (2 April 1978); National Soccer League; 4–1 vs. Ascot (A) (24 May 1978); NSL Cup
- Biggest defeat: 1–4 vs. St George-Budapest (H) (12 March 1978); National Soccer League

The 1978 season was the second in the National Soccer League for West Adelaide Soccer Club. In addition to the domestic league, they also participated in the NSL Cup. West Adelaide finished 1st in their National Soccer League season, and were eliminated in the second round of the NSL Cup.

== Players ==
Note: Flags indicate national team as defined under FIFA eligibility rules; some limited exceptions apply. Players may hold more than one non-FIFA nationality.

No.	Pos.	Nation	Player
1	GK	AUS	Martyn Crook
2	DF	ENG	Peter Tymczyszyn
3	DF	AUS	Barry Reynolds
4	MF	SCO	Neil McGachey
5		AUS	Lucky Vagianos
6	DF	AUS	David Jones
7	FW	AUS	Peter Boyle (captain)
8	FW	AUS	Dave Pillans
9	FW	RSA	Graham Norris
10	FW	SCO	Graham Honeyman
11	MF	SCO	Ian McGregor

No.	Pos.	Nation	Player
12	DF	AUS	Vic Bozanic
13	FW	AUS	George Koulianos
14	MF	AUS	John Batchelor
15	FW	AUS	Alex Zervas
16	DF	GRE	Con Kambas
17	FW	AUS	Nick Pantelis
20	GK	IRL	Sam Service
—	DF	SCO	Eric Carruthers
—	MF	SCO	Gordon McCulloch
—		YUG	Uros Zivkovic

== Competitions ==
=== Overall record ===
Competition	First match	Last match	Starting round	Final position	Record							
Competition	First match	Last match	Starting round	Final position	Pld	W	D	L	GF	GA	GD	Win %
National Soccer League	5 March 1978	27 August 1978	Matchday 1	1st	26	16	4	6	42	27	+15	61.54
NSL Cup	24 May 1978	19 July 1978	First round	Second round	2	1	0	1	2	4	−2	50.00
Total					28	17	4	7	44	31	+13	60.71

Source: Competitions

=== National Soccer League ===
==== League table ====
Pos	Team	Pld	W	D	L	GF	GA	GD	Pts	Qualification
1	West Adelaide (C)	26	16	4	6	42	27	+15	36	Qualification to Finals series (Note: The Finals series was not considered the championship for the 1978 National Soccer League.)
2	Eastern Suburbs	26	15	5	6	49	27	+22	35	Qualification to Finals series
3	South Melbourne	26	12	8	6	45	30	+15	32	Qualification to Finals series
4	Marconi Fairfield	26	12	6	8	46	31	+15	30	Qualification to Finals series
5	Fitzroy United	26	9	8	9	39	39	0	26	

Source: rsssf.com
Rules for classification: 1) Points; 2) Goal difference; 3) Goals scored
(C) Champions

==== Results summary ====
Overall								Home						Away					
Pld	W	D	L	GF	GA	GD	Pts	W	D	L	GF	GA	GD	W	D	L	GF	GA	GD
26	16	4	6	42	27	+15	52	9	1	3	24	14	+10	7	3	3	18	13	+5

Source: worldfootball.net

==== Results by round ====
Round	1	2	3	4	5	6	7	8	9	10	11	12	13	14	15	16	17	18	19	20	21	22	23	24	25	26
Ground	A	H	H	A	H	A	H	A	A	H	A	H	A	A	H	A	H	A	H	A	H	H	A	H	A	H
Result	D	L	L	W	W	D	L	W	L	W	W	W	W	W	W	W	W	L	W	D	W	W	L	W	W	D
Position	7	13	13	11	7	7	7	6	11	5	4	2	2	2	2	2	2	2	2	1	1	1	1	1	1	1
Points	1	1	1	3	5	6	6	8	8	10	12	14	16	18	20	22	24	24	26	27	29	31	31	33	35	36

Source: worldfootball.net
A = Away; H = Home; W = Win; D = Draw; L = Loss

==== Matches ====
Win Draw Loss

5 March 1978 1	Canberra City	1–1	West Adelaide	Canberra
	Grujicic 82' (pen.)	Report	Norris 68'	Stadium: Bruce Stadium; Attendance: 6,000; Referee: Ken Allen

12 March 1978 2	West Adelaide	1–4	St George-Budapest	Adelaide
	McGachey 59'	Report	R. O'Shea 37'; J. O'Shea 61'; O'Connor 62'; Jones 81'	Stadium: Hindmarsh Stadium; Attendance: 5,233; Referee: Jim Johnston

19 March 1978 3	West Adelaide	0–1	Sydney Olympic	Adelaide
		Report	Senkalski 46'	Stadium: Hindmarsh Stadium; Attendance: 4,500; Referee: Graham Neal

25 March 1978 4	Newcastle KB United	0–1	West Adelaide	Newcastle
		Report	Drinkwater 45' (o.g.)	Stadium: Newcastle International Sports Centre; Attendance: 7,019; Referee: Richard Lorenc

2 April 1978 5	West Adelaide	3–0	Brisbane Lions	Adelaide
	Jones 52'; McGregor 61'; Boyle 87'	Report		Stadium: Hindmarsh Stadium; Attendance: 4,786; Referee: Don Campbell

8 April 1978 6	Fitzroy United	1–1	West Adelaide	Melbourne
	Cole 73'	Report	Carruthers 90+1'	Stadium: Middle Park Soccer Stadium; Attendance: 3,500; Referee: David Yelland

16 April 1978 7	West Adelaide	1–2	Footscray JUST	Adelaide
	Bozanic 32'	Report	Picioane 82'; Rujevic 85'	Stadium: Hindmarsh Stadium; Attendance: 5,523; Referee: Jack Tarling

23 April 1978 8	Brisbane City	0–1	West Adelaide	Brisbane
		Report	McGachey 44'	Stadium: Perry Park; Attendance: 4,200; Referee: Bob Mee

30 April 1978 9	Marconi Fairfield	2–0	West Adelaide	Sydney
15:00 AEST	Mariani 16'; Jankovics 48'	Report		Stadium: Marconi Oval; Attendance: 6,479; Referee: Richard Lorenc

7 May 1978 10	West Adelaide	3–2	Eastern Suburbs	Adelaide
	Bozanic 20'; O'Connor 53' (o.g.); McGregor 56'	Report	Barnes 22', 37'	Stadium: Hindmarsh Stadium; Attendance: 5,341; Referee: Tony Beazleigh

14 May 1978 11	Western Suburbs	1–2	West Adelaide	Sydney
	Harding 37'	Report	McGregor 50'; Honeyman 70'	Stadium: Wentworth Park; Attendance: 2,685; Referee: Tim Davies

21 May 1978 12	West Adelaide	3–1	South Melbourne	Adelaide
	Kambas 42' (pen.); Honeyman 76'; Tymczyszyn 87'	Report	Ollerton 30'	Stadium: Hindmarsh Stadium; Attendance: 10,000; Referee: Dennis Stanley

28 May 1978 13	Adelaide City	1–2	West Adelaide	Adelaide
	Marocchi 60'	Report	Reynolds 7'; Norris 52'	Stadium: Olympic Sports Field; Attendance: 11,734; Referee: Jim Dixon

4 June 1978 14	St George-Budapest	0–1	West Adelaide	Sydney
		Report	Kambas 4' (pen.)	Stadium: St George Stadium; Attendance: 3,254; Referee: Henry Witschge

11 June 1978 15	West Adelaide	2–0	Canberra City	Adelaide
	McGregor 28'; Norris 90'	Report		Stadium: Hindmarsh Stadium; Attendance: 4,321; Referee: Bobby Kerr

17 June 1978 16	Sydney Olympic	2–4	West Adelaide	Sydney
	Pirie 5', 43'	Report	McGachey 23', 24'; McGregor 70'; Boyle 87'	Stadium: Erskineville Oval; Attendance: 1,860; Referee: Richard Lorenc

25 June 1978 17	West Adelaide	1–0	Newcastle KB United	Adelaide
	Bozanic 21'	Report		Stadium: Hindmarsh Stadium; Attendance: 4,400; Referee: Jim Johnston

2 July 1978 18	Brisbane Lions	1–0	West Adelaide	Brisbane
	Neale 73'	Report		Stadium: Perry Park; Attendance: 3,300; Referee: Peter Rampley

9 July 1978 19	West Adelaide	3–2	Fitzroy United	Adelaide
	Honeyman 52', 57'; Boyle 54'	Report	Campbell 51'; Taylor 68' (pen.)	Stadium: Hindmarsh Stadium; Attendance: 5,993; Referee: Graham Neal

16 July 1978 20	Footscray JUST	2–2	West Adelaide	Melbourne
	Kriaris 49'; Vasic 58'	Report	Jones 65'; McGregor 73'	Stadium: Middle Park Soccer Stadium; Attendance: 1,000; Referee: Jim Dixon

23 July 1978 21	West Adelaide	2–0	Brisbane City	Adelaide
	Pillans 63'; Jones 77'	Report		Stadium: Hindmarsh Stadium; Attendance: 4,300; Referee: Don Campbell

30 July 1978 22	West Adelaide	2–1	Marconi Fairfield	Adelaide
	Norris 21'; Pillans 55'	Report	Mariani 6'	Stadium: Hindmarsh Stadium; Attendance: 12,671; Referee: Stewart Melllings

6 August 1978 23	Eastern Suburbs	2–1	West Adelaide	Sydney
	Smith 14'; Silva 36'	Report	Honeyman 2'	Stadium: Wentworth Park; Attendance: 4,102; Referee: Jack Readshaw

13 August 1978 24	West Adelaide	2–0	Western Suburbs	Adelaide
	Norris 42'; Boyle 61'	Report		Stadium: Hindmarsh Stadium; Attendance: 4,321; Referee: Jim Johnston

20 August 1978 25	South Melbourne	0–2	West Adelaide	Melbourne
		Report	McGregor 15'; Jones 50'	Stadium: Middle Park Soccer Stadium; Attendance: 12,000; Referee: Tim Davies

27 August 1978 26	West Adelaide	1–1	Adelaide City	Adelaide
	Bozanic 85'	Report	Perin 53'	Stadium: Hindmarsh Stadium; Attendance: 16,251; Referee: Peter Rampley

==== Finals series ====
The Finals series was not considered the championship for the 1978 National Soccer League.

3 September 1978 Semi-finals	West Adelaide	2–3 (a.e.t.)	Eastern Suburbs	Adelaide
	Koulianos 12'; Reynolds 14'	Report	Souness 20'; Barnes 53'; Campbell 117'	Stadium: Hindmarsh Stadium; Attendance: 4,800; Referee: Tony Beazleigh

10 September 1978 Preliminary Final	Marconi Fairfield	2–0	West Adelaide	Sydney
	Mariani 61'; Sharne 81'	Report		Stadium: Marconi Oval; Attendance: 6,885; Referee: Chris Bambridge

=== NSL Cup ===
Win Draw Loss

24 May 1978 First round	Ascot (Western Australia)	1–4	West Adelaide	Perth
	Jones 31' (o.g.)	Report	Honeyman 30', 86'; McGregor 55'; Norris 85'	Stadium: Lake Monger Velodrome; Attendance:

19 July 1978 Second round	Adelaide City	1–0	West Adelaide	Adelaide
	Marwe 76'	Report		Stadium: Hindmarsh Stadium; Attendance: 6,856; Referee: Graham Neal

== Statistics ==
=== Appearances and goals ===
Includes all competitions. Players with no appearances not included in the list.

No.	Pos.	Nat.	Player	National Soccer League		NSL Cup		Total	
No.	Pos.	Nat.	Player	Apps	Goals	Apps	Goals	Apps	Goals
1	GK	(Australia)	Martyn Crook	26	0	0	0	26	0
2	DF	(England)	Peter Tymczyszyn	16+2	1	1	0	19	1
3	DF	(Australia)	Barry Reynolds	25	1	2	0	27	1
4	MF	(Scotland)	Neil McGachey	26	4	1	0	27	4
5		(Australia)	Lucky Vagianos	4+1	0	0	0	5	0
6	DF	(Australia)	David Jones	25	4	2	0	27	4
7	FW	(Australia)	Peter Boyle	24+2	4	1	0	27	4
8	FW	(Australia)	Dave Pillans	13	2	0	0	13	2
9	FW	(South Africa)	Graham Norris	18+4	5	1	1	23	6
10	FW	(Scotland)	Graham Honeyman	1	0	2	2	3	2
11	MF	(Scotland)	Ian McGregor	24	7	2	1	26	8
12	DF	(Australia)	Vic Bozanic	21+4	4	1	0	26	4
13	FW	(Australia)	George Koulianos	0+3	0	1	0	4	0
14	MF	(Australia)	John Batchelor	2	0	0+1	0	3	0
15	FW	(Australia)	Alex Zervas	8+3	0	0+1	0	12	0
16	DF	(Greece)	Con Kambas	21	2	1	0	22	2
17	FW	(Australia)	Nick Pantelis	2	0	0	0	2	0
20	GK	(Republic of Ireland)	Sam Service	1+1	0	0	0	2	0
—	DF	(Scotland)	Eric Carruthers	4+1	1	0	0	5	1
—	MF	(Scotland)	Gordon McCulloch	1	0	0	0	1	0
—	—	(Socialist Federal Republic of Yugoslavia)	Uros Zivkovic	2+1	0	0	0	3	0

=== Disciplinary record ===
Includes all competitions. The list is sorted by squad number when total cards are equal. Players with no cards not included in the list.

Rank	No.	Pos.	Nat.	Player	National Soccer League			NSL Cup			Total		
Rank	No.	Pos.	Nat.	Player	Yellow card	Second yellow card	Red card	Yellow card	Second yellow card	Red card	Yellow card	Second yellow card	Red card
1	9	FW	(South Africa)	Graham Norris	4	0	1	0	0	0	4	0	1
2	5	—	(Australia)	Lucky Vagianos	4	0	0	0	0	0	4	0	0
3	3	DF	(Australia)	Barry Reynolds	3	0	0	0	0	0	3	0	0
3	7	FW	(Australia)	Peter Boyle	3	0	0	0	0	0	3	0	0
3	16	DF	(Greece)	Con Kambas	3	0	0	0	0	0	3	0	0
6	4	MF	(Scotland)	Neil McGacey	2	0	0	0	0	0	2	0	0
6	6	DF	(Australia)	David Jones	2	0	0	0	0	0	2	0	0
8	15	FW	(Australia)	Alex Zervas	1	0	0	0	0	0	1	0	0
Total					22	0	1	0	0	0	22	0	1

=== Clean sheets ===
Includes all competitions. The list is sorted by squad number when total clean sheets are equal. Numbers in parentheses represent games where both goalkeepers participated and both kept a clean sheet; the number in parentheses is awarded to the goalkeeper who was substituted on, whilst a full clean sheet is awarded to the goalkeeper who was on the field at the start of play. Goalkeepers with no clean sheets not included in the list.

Rank	No.	Nat.	Goalkeeper	NSL	NSL Cup	Total
1	1	(Australia)	Martyn Crook	8	0	8
Total				8	0	8
