= 1979 NSL Cup =

National Soccer League Cup

Tournament details
- Country: Australia
- Dates: 25 April – 30 September 1979
- Teams: 32

Final positions
- Champions: Adelaide City (1st title)
- Runners-up: St George-Budapest

Tournament statistics
- Matches played: 31
- Goals scored: 108 (3.48 per match)
- Attendance: 108,067 (3,486 per match)
- Top goal scorer: John Nyskohus (7 goals)

The 1979 NSL Cup was the third season of the NSL Cup, which was the main national association football knockout cup competition in Australia. All 14 NSL teams from around Australia entered the competition, as well as a further 18 from various state leagues around Australia.

== Teams ==
The NSL Cup was a knockout competition with 32 teams taking part all trying to reach the Final in September 1979. The competition consisted of the 14 teams from the National Soccer League plus 18 teams from their respective top division state leagues.

Round	Main date	Number of fixtures	Clubs remaining
First round	Wednesday 25 April 1979	16	32 → 16
Second round	Sunday 20 May 1979	8	16 → 8
Quarter-finals	Sunday 27 May 1979	4	8 → 4
Semi-finals	Sunday 12 August 1979	2	4 → 2
Final	Sunday 30 September 1979	1	2 → 1

== First round ==
25 April 1979	Adelaide City (1)	1–0	West Adelaide (1)	Adelaide
	J. Nyskohus 88' (pen.)	Report		Stadium: Olympic Sports Field; Attendance: 8,123; Referee: Chris Bambridge

25 April 1979	Brisbane City (1)	1–0	St George-Souths (2)	Brisbane
	Kelso 48', 82'	Report		Stadium: Perry Park; Attendance: 2,000; Referee: Dave Nugent

25 April 1979	Brisbane Lions (1)	2–2 (a.e.t.) (5–4 p)	Southside Eagles (2)	Brisbane
	Ontong 15'; Hermiston 80'	Report	Millman 13'; McCabe 63' (pen.)	Stadium: Perry Park; Attendance: 2,000; Referee: Jack Wood

25 April 1979	Canberra City (1)	3–1	West Woden (2)	Canberra
	Grujicic 28'; Brown 66'; Fielding 70'	Report	Wate 21'	Stadium: Bruce Stadium; Attendance: 1,500; Referee: Doug Rennie

25 April 1979	Cumberland United (2)	1–4	Olympic Kingsway (2)	Adelaide
	McNally 58'	Report	Proctor 44', 52'; Tombides 79', 86'	Stadium: Hindmarsh Stadium; Attendance: 1,500; Referee: Tony Beazleigh

25 April 1979	Eastern Districts Azzurri (2)	2–0	Elizabeth City (2)	Adelaide
	Alder 55'; Smythe 80'	Report		Stadium: Hindmarsh Stadium; Attendance: 1,500; Referee: Stewart Mellings

25 April 1979	Footscray JUST (1)	2–1	George Cross (2)	Melbourne
	Palinkas 21'; Rujevic 75'	Report	Thom 15'	Stadium: Olympic Park; Attendance: 6,000; Referee: Stewart Mellings

25 April 1979	Heidelberg United (1)	2–1	South Melbourne (1)	Melbourne
	Campbell 60', 63'	Report	Christopoulos 15'	Stadium: Olympic Park; Attendance: 6,000; Referee: Graham Neale

25 April 1979	Marconi Fairfield (1)	0–2	Melita Eagles (2)	Sydney
		Report	R. Farrugia 56'; McPherson 60'	Stadium: Marconi Oval; Attendance: 4,578; Referee: Ken Allen

25 April 1979	Newcastle KB United (1)	3–2	Edgeworth Eagles (2)	Newcastle
	Boden 26', 47'; Heys 38'	Report	Blazejewski 75'; Parkinson 90'	Stadium: Newcastle International Sports Centre; Referee: Bill Jones

25 April 1979	Preston Makedonia (2)	6–0	White Eagles (2)	Melbourne
	Ward 9', 79', 84' (pen.), 88'; Cullen 27'; Rainey 30'	Report		Stadium: Middle Park Soccer Stadium; Attendance: 2,500; Referee: Peter Rampley

25 April 1979	St Kilda Hakoah (2)	0–4	Essendon Croatia (2)	Melbourne
		Report	Murphy 42'; Owens 48' (o.g.); Gilder 49'; Cumming 86'	Stadium: Middle Park Soccer Stadium; Attendance: 2,500; Referee: Jack Johnston

25 April 1979	St George-Budapest (1)	6–2	Ipswich United (2)	Sydney
	Morgan ?', ?'; Katholos ?', ?'; J. O'Shea ?'; O'Connor ?'	Report	R. Wilson ?'; Kathage ?'	Stadium: St George Stadium; Attendance: 1,982; Referee: Richard Lorenc

25 April 1979	Sutherland (2)	1–2	Sydney Olympic (1)	Sydney
	Beggs ?'	Report	Botham ?'; Eaton ?'	Stadium: St George Stadium; Attendance: 1,982; Referee: Tony Boskovic

25 April 1979	Sydney City (1)	4–2	Auburn (2)	Sydney
	Borges ?', ?', ?'; Stevenson ?'	Report	Leak ?'; Montgomery ?'	Stadium: Wentworth Park; Referee: Henry Witschge

25 April 1979	Sydney Croatia (2)	0–3	APIA Leichhardt (1)	Sydney
		Report	Samuels 58', 60'; Drewes 88'	Stadium: Wentworth Park; Referee: Tim Davies

== Second round ==
19 May 1979	Newcastle KB United (1)	3–0	Sydney Olympic (1)	Newcastle
	Senkalski 24', 66', 71'	Report		Stadium: Newcastle International Sports Centre; Attendance: 6,027; Referee: Ken Allen

20 May 1979	Adelaide City (1)	3–2	Preston Makedonia (2)	Adelaide
	Muir 7'; J. Nyskohus 46', 100'	Report	McMillan 8'; Cullen 23'	Stadium: Olympic Sports Field; Attendance: 4,500; Referee: Richard Lorenc

20 May 1979	Brisbane City (1)	1–0	Brisbane Lions (1)	Brisbane
	Low 28'	Report		Stadium: Perry Park; Attendance: 2,500; Referee: Tony Boskovic

20 May 1979	St George-Budapest (1)	3–2	APIA Leichhardt (1)	Sydney
	J. O'Shea 53'; O'Connor 58'; Hensman 86'	Report	Reed 9'; Rampanti 61'	Stadium: St George Stadium; Attendance: 2,783; Referee: Bill Jones

20 May 1979	Sydney City (1)	2–1	Melita Eagles (2)	Sydney
	Barnes 21'; Mullen 57'	Report	Allan 59'	Stadium: Sydney Sports Ground; Attendance: 1,052; Referee: Peter Rampley

23 May 1979	Canberra City (1)	4–0	Essendon Croatia (2)	Canberra
	Stark 44'; Byrne 75', 77'; Moulis 89'	Report		Stadium: Bruce Stadium; Attendance: 3,000; Referee: Tim Davies

23 May 1979	Eastern Districts Azzurri (2)	3–1	Olympic Kingsway (2)	Adelaide
	Kowalski 36'; Smythe 47'; Alder 84'	Report	Proctor 69'	Stadium: Hindmarsh Stadium; Attendance: 1,300; Referee: Stewart Mellings

23 May 1979	Footscray JUST (1)	2–0	Heidelberg United (1)	Melbourne
	Ilioski 28'; Palinkas 87'	Report		Stadium: Olympic Park; Attendance: 3,000; Referee: Chris Bambridge

== Quarter-finals ==
27 May 1979	Canberra City (1)	4–1	Footscray JUST (1)	Canberra
	Byrne 75', 77'; Cant 50'; Grujicic 81'	Report	Ilioski 87'	Stadium: Bruce Stadium; Attendance: 4,972; Referee: Richard Lorenc

27 May 1979	Brisbane City (1)	1–1 (a.e.t.) (3–4 p)	St George-Budapest (1)	Brisbane
	Ratcliffe 17'	Report	Hensman 11'	Stadium: Perry Park; Attendance: 2,500; Referee: Chris Bambridge

30 May 1979	Newcastle KB United (1)	2–1 (a.e.t.)	Sydney City (1)	Newcastle
	Boden 67'; Summerscales 111'	Report	Stevenson 64'	Stadium: Newcastle International Sports Centre; Attendance: 4,427; Referee: Stewart Mellings

4 July 1979	Adelaide City (1)	5–0	Eastern Districts Azzurri (2)	Adelaide
	J. Nyskohus 31', 46'; Deans 32'; Marwe 37'; B. Nyskohus 43'	Report		Stadium: Hindmarsh Stadium; Attendance: 3,000; Referee: Tony Beazleigh

== Semi-finals ==
12 August 1979	Adelaide City (1)	1–0	Canberra City (1)	Adelaide
	Northcote 4'	Report		Stadium: Olympic Sports Field; Attendance: 3,100; Referee: Stewart Mellings

12 August 1979	Newcastle KB United (1)	0–0 (a.e.t.) (2–3 p)	St George-Budapest (1)	Newcastle
		Report		Stadium: Newcastle International Sports Centre; Attendance: 15,177; Referee: Ken Allen

== Final ==
30 September 1979
14:30 ACDT

Adelaide City	3–2	St George Budapest
J. Nyskohous 54', 76'; B. Nyskohus 65'	Report	O'Connor 21'; O'Shea 48'

Olympic Sports Field, Adelaide
Attendance: 9,554

== Top scorers ==
Rank	Player	Club	Goals
1	(Australia) John Nyskohus	Adelaide City	7
2	(Australia) Terry Byrne	Fitzroy United	4
2	(Australia) Gary Ward	Preston Makedonia	4
4	(Australia) Ken Boden	Newcastle KB United	3
4	(Brazil) Neilo Borges	Sydney City	3
4	(Australia) Phil O'Connor	St George-Budapest	3
4	(Australia) John O'Shea	St George-Budapest	3
4	(Australia) Chris Proctor	Olympic Kingsway	3
4	(Australia) Joe Senkalski	Newcastle KB United	3
