= 1979 in Australian soccer =

Soccer in Australia
- Season: 1979

Men's soccer
- National Soccer League: Marconi Fairfield
- NSL Cup: Adelaide City

The 1979 season was the tenth season of national competitive soccer in Australia and 96th overall.

== National teams ==
=== Australia men's national soccer team ===
==== Results and fixtures ====
===== Friendlies =====
| 13 June 1979 | New Zealand | 1–0 | Australia | Auckland, New Zealand |
| | Ormond 58' | Report | | Stadium: Newmarket Park; Attendance: 4,000; Referee: Tom Delahunty |

| 27 November 1979 | Chinese Taipei | 0–2 | Australia | Taipei, Taiwan |
| | | Report | Cumming 43'; Cole 74' | Attendance: 2,000 |

=== Australia women's national soccer team ===
==== Results and fixtures ====
===== Friendlies =====
| 6 October 1979 | Australia | 2–2 | New Zealand | Sydney, Australia |
| | Brentnall ?'; Loveless ?' | Report | Marshall ?'; Hetherington ?' | Stadium: Seymour Shaw Park; Attendance: |

| 8 October 1979 | Australia | 0–1 | New Zealand | Sydney, Australia |
| | | Report | Ah Wong ?' | Stadium: Seymour Shaw Park |

| 13 October 1979 | Australia | 1–0 | New Zealand | Brisbane, Australia |
| | Loveless ?' | Report | | Stadium: Perry Park |

=== Australia men's national under-20 soccer team ===
==== Results and fixtures ====
===== 1979 FIFA World Youth Championship qualification =====
====== Inter-continental qualification ======
| Pos | Team | Pld | W | D | L | GF | GA | GD | Pts | Qualification |
|---|---|---|---|---|---|---|---|---|---|---|
| 1 | Paraguay | 4 | 4 | 0 | 0 | 10 | 1 | +9 | 8 | Qualification for 1979 FIFA World Youth Championship |
| 2 | Israel | 4 | 0 | 2 | 2 | 1 | 5 | −4 | 2 | |
| 3 | Australia | 4 | 0 | 2 | 2 | 0 | 5 | −5 | 2 | |

Source: RSSSF

| 7 February 1979 | Paraguay | 2–0 | Australia | Asunción, Paraguay |
| | Romerito 11' (60) | Report | | Stadium: Estadio Defensores del Chaco; Attendance: 45,000 |

| 9 February 1979 | Israel | 0–0 | Australia | Asunción, Paraguay |
| | | Report | | Stadium: Estadio Defensores del Chaco; Attendance: 25,000 |

| 17 February 1979 | Australia | 0–0 | Israel | Asunción, Paraguay |
| | | Report | | Stadium: Estadio Defensores del Chaco; Attendance: 5,000 |

| 18 February 1979 | Paraguay | 3–0 | Australia | Asunción, Paraguay |
| | | Report | | Stadium: Estadio Defensores del Chaco; Attendance: 40,000 |

== Domestic soccer ==
=== National Soccer League ===
| Pos | Team | Pld | W | D | L | GF | GA | GD | Pts | Qualification or relegation |
|---|---|---|---|---|---|---|---|---|---|---|
| 1 | Marconi Fairfield (C) | 26 | 15 | 6 | 5 | 58 | 32 | +26 | 40 (Note: A Bonus Point was awarded for victories of 4 goals or more.) | Qualification to Finals series (Note: The Finals series was not considered the championship for the 1979 National Soccer League.) |
| 2 | Heidelberg United | 26 | 14 | 7 | 5 | 44 | 30 | +14 | 36 | Qualification to Finals series |
| 3 | Sydney City | 26 | 15 | 3 | 8 | 47 | 29 | +18 | 34 | Qualification to Finals series |
| 4 | Brisbane City | 26 | 14 | 5 | 7 | 38 | 30 | +8 | 34 | Qualification to Finals series |
| 5 | Adelaide City | 26 | 13 | 6 | 7 | 43 | 27 | +16 | 33 | |
| 6 | Newcastle KB United | 26 | 11 | 9 | 6 | 43 | 30 | +13 | 32 | |
| 7 | West Adelaide | 26 | 10 | 4 | 12 | 28 | 31 | −3 | 25 | |
| 8 | APIA Leichhardt | 26 | 11 | 3 | 12 | 29 | 37 | −8 | 25 | |
| 9 | Brisbane Lions | 26 | 8 | 6 | 12 | 28 | 40 | −12 | 22 | |
| 10 | Footscray JUST | 26 | 8 | 3 | 15 | 29 | 43 | −14 | 20 | |
| 11 | St George-Budapest | 26 | 7 | 6 | 13 | 27 | 43 | −16 | 20 | |
| 12 | Canberra City | 26 | 6 | 8 | 12 | 25 | 41 | −16 | 20 | |
| 13 | Sydney Olympic (R) | 26 | 7 | 5 | 14 | 23 | 30 | −7 | 19 | Relegated to the 1980 NSW State League |
| 14 | South Melbourne | 26 | 6 | 3 | 17 | 26 | 45 | −19 | 16 | |

Updated to match(es) played on unknown. Source: rsssf.com
Rules for classification: 1) points; 2) goal difference; 3) number of goals scored.
(C) Champions; (R) Relegated

=== NSL Cup ===
==== Final ====
30 September 1979
14:30 ACDT

| Adelaide City | 3–2 | St George Budapest |
|---|---|---|
| J. Nyskohous 54', 76'; B. Nyskohus 65' | Report | O'Connor 21'; O'Shea 48' |

Olympic Sports Field, Adelaide
Attendance: 9,554

== Retirements ==
- 10 December 1979: Jim Mangopoulos, former Heidelberg United player.
