= Rosie Ah Wong =

New Zealand footballer

Personal information
- Full name: Rosie Ah Wong

International career
Years	Team	Apps	(Gls)
1979–1982	New Zealand	8	(1)

Rosie Ah Wong is a former association football player who represented New Zealand at international level.

Ah Wong made her Football Ferns début in a 2–2 draw with Australia on 6 September 1979, and finished her international career with eight caps and one goal to her credit.
