= Ken Murphy =

American soccer player and coach

Kenny Murphy
Personal information
- Full name: Kenneth P. Murphy
- Date of birth: May 10, 1958 (age 68)
- Place of birth: Westport, Connecticut, U.S.
- Positions: Midfielder; defender

College career
Years	Team	Apps	(Gls)
1976–1979	UConn Huskies		

Senior career*
Years	Team	Apps	(Gls)
1980	Detroit Express	2	(0)
1981	Washington Diplomats	4	(0)

Managerial career
- 2003–2009: Brown Bears (assistant)
- 2009–2019: Connecticut College Camels
- * Club domestic league appearances and goals

Kenneth Murphy is an American retired soccer player who played professionally in the North American Soccer League and is currently the head coach of the Connecticut College men's soccer team.

== Player ==
=== Youth ===
In 1976, Murphy graduated from Staples High School where was a two-time All State soccer player and a member of a State Championship soccer team. He also played hockey and was two-time All FCIAC player. He attended the University of Connecticut, playing on the men's soccer team from 1976 to 1979. He completed his undergraduate degree in 1982. In 1986, he earned a master's degree in accounting from Sacred Heart University.

=== Professional ===
In 1980, both the Hartford Hellions of the Major Indoor Soccer League and the Detroit Express of the North American Soccer League drafted Murphy. He signed with the Express for the 1980 season. In 1981, he moved to the Washington Diplomats before suffering a career ending knee injury in June.

== Coach ==
After his retirement from playing, Murphy worked in both the American Broadcasting Company and CBS Records accounting sections. He then worked as a commodities broker. In 2003, he became an assistant coach with Brown University's men's soccer team. In June 2009, Connecticut College hired Murphy to coach the men's soccer team. In May 2019, Murphy announced his retirement.
