= Brian O'Donnell =

Scottish footballer (born 1957)

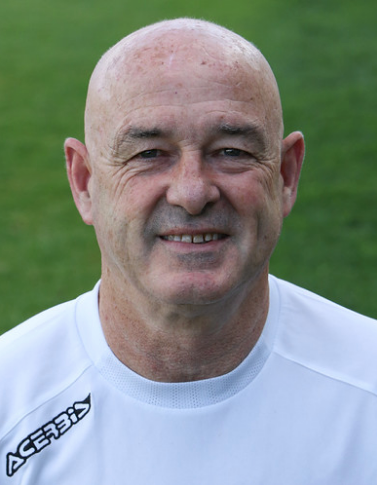
- Brian O'Donnell at Dorchester Town

Personal information
- Full name: Brian Francis O'Donnell
- Date of birth: 8 August 1957
- Place of birth: Port Glasgow, Scotland
- Date of death: 5 November 2020 (aged 63)
- Place of death: Poole, England
- Position: Midfielder

Youth career
- 1973–1975: AFC Bournemouth

Senior career*
Years	Team	Apps	(Gls)
1975–1976	AFC Bournemouth	0	(0)
1976–1978	Bristol Rovers	0	(0)
1978	Western Suburbs	26	(1)
1978–1980	APIA Leichhardt	30	(1)
1980–1981	Blacktown City Demons	48	(8)
1981–1982	AFC Bournemouth	14	(0)
1982-1983	Torquay United	19	(1)
1983	Yeovil FC	1	(0)
1983–1985	Footscray JUST	55	(1)
1985–1987	Bath City	63	(2)
1988	Weymouth	1	(0)
1988-1989	Basingstoke Town	20	(0)
Total		275	(14)

Managerial career
- 1993–1999: Bournemouth Sports Club
- 2000–2001: Bournemouth Poppies
- 2002–2003: Poole Town
- 2005–2009: AFC Bournemouth (youth)
- 2009: Dorchester Town
- 2013: Frome Town
- * Club domestic league appearances and goals

Brian Francis O'Donnell (8 August 1957 – 5 November 2020) was a Scottish professional footballer who played as a midfielder in England and Australia, before becoming a manager and coach.

== Early life ==
O'Donnell was one of five children born to Maurice and Elizabeth O'Donnell. Born in Port Glasgow, he spent the majority of his youth in the town of Yeovil, Somerset.

== Playing career ==
O'Donnell began his football career as an apprentice with AFC Bournemouth, moving to the town in 1973, aged 15. After failing to make a first team appearance for the club, O'Donnell signed for Bristol Rovers where he made his professional debut in May 1976.

=== Western Suburbs & APIA Leichhardt ===
Frustrated by a lack of playing time in England, O'Donnell moved to Sydney, Australia. He was one of a number of signings made by Western Suburbs SC (NSW) including fellow British signing, John Vernon - who had moved from Stockport County. On 5 March 1978, O'Donnell made his debut in the National Premier League in a 1-0 win over Sydney Olympic FC playing left midfield.

He scored his first goal for the club in the last minute of a 2-2 draw away to Canberra City FC in May 1978. O'Donnell made 26 appearances for Western Suburbs until the club were taken over by APIA Leichhardt at the end of the 1978 season.

O'Donnell made 30 appearances over two seasons for APIA and scored his only goal for the club in a 5-1 defeat to Footscray JUST in September 1979.

=== Blacktown City ===
1980

O'Donnell started the 1980 season amid rumours that he would be one of several players sold owing to financial uncertainty at APIA. After 6 league appearances for APIA, newly promoted Blacktown City FC signed O'Donnell for AUD$8,000. O'Donnell scored on his debut in a 3–1 win against Brisbane City on 10 May 1980 and was a central figure to the side staying clear of relegation, despite the club's limited resources.

In one of the stand-out matches of the 1980 season, O'Donnell scored two in a 5-1 win over Marconi, a club that had tried to sign O'Donnell before the season began.

1981

The 1981 season started well for O'Donnell who had established himself as one of the most important players in the squad, notching a goal in the opener against Brisbane Lions in a 2-2 draw. He went on to win Player of the Season for Blacktown City FC and played every league and cup match of the 1981 season and being named in the Australian Team XI of 1981.

=== AFC Bournemouth ===
O'Donnell's appearances in Australia earned him a move to the English Football League as he re-signed for AFC Bournemouth in the Fourth Division. O'Donnell made his professional debut for the club seven years after he first joined as an apprentice. He went on to make 14 appearances during the 1981–82 season that saw the club get promoted to the Third Division for the first time in the club's history - in a side that included Nigel Spackman, Tony Funnell and Harry Redknapp as player/coach.

=== Torquay United & a return to Australia ===
O'Donnell moved to Torquay United in October 1982 on a free transfer, making his debut at left-back in place of Mark Smith in the 3–1 win at home to Northampton Town on 16 October and made 19 league appearances that season.

O'Donnell made one appearance for Yeovil Town before signing for South Melbourne FC.

=== Footscray JUST ===
The proposed move to South Melbourne fell through and instead O'Donnell signed for Footscray JUST. His debut came in a 1-0 loss to Canberra Arrows in July 1983. He scored his first goal for the club in a 2-1 loss away to Preston Makedonia in the 1983 season. He played in the 1984 NSL Cup semi-final 1-0 loss to Melbourne Croatia. O'Donnell went to make 55 appearances over three seasons with a severe torn abductor injury meaning he could only manage 9 appearances in the 1985 season.

=== Non-league English football ===
In February 1986, O'Donnell returned to the UK and joined Bath City. He later played for Weymouth, Basingstoke Town, Bashley, Poole Town and Salisbury City before moving into coaching in the UK.

== Managerial & coaching career ==
He was appointed as manager of Bournemouth Sports CMFC in 1993, winning the Dorset Combination League title and Dorset Combination Cup along with notable success in the FA Cup.

In 1999, O'Donnell joined Salisbury as reserve team manager before taking over as manager of Bournemouth Poppies in February 2000.

Bournemouth Poppies managed to avoid relegation following O'Donnell's arrival, despite a points deduction placed on the club due to mismanagement of finances by the board. In June 2001 amid a mass resignation of the Poppies executive committee, and after steering the club to a comfortable mid-table finish, O'Donnell left and in January the following year took over as manager of Poole Town finishing 5th in the Hampshire Premier League.

However, he left Poole in August 2002.

He later returned to AFC Bournemouth as their youth coach.

In February 2009 he joined the coaching staff at Dorchester Town as caretaker manager.

Despite an impressive start that drew four points from four games, including a 0–0 draw away to league-topping Basingstoke and with only having nine players signed, O'Donnell was not offered the job full-time and instead the position was given to Roy O'Brien by chairman Eddie Mitchell. O'Brien had been due to walk away from the club prior to being convinced to stay on when O'Donnell took over. O'Brien was subsequently sacked later that year due to a string of poor performances

O'Donnell was appointed Manager of Frome Town in 2013 after working as a scout for Middlesbrough following similar spells with West Bromwich Albion and Hibernian.

O'Donnell later returned to Dorchester Town as the director of football before having to step down due to ill health.

== Personal life ==
In 2003, O'Donnell took part in the Marathon des Sables.

In 2007, it was revealed in the Bournemouth Echo that O'Donnell was acting as a broker for an unnamed businessman in an unsuccessful takeover bid of AFC Bournemouth. Following a rival takeover, the club went into administration for the second time in their history the following year.

His father, Maurice O'Donnell was a former footballer and coach - with an association with Yeovil Football Club that lasted over 50 years.

== Legacy ==
Since O'Donnell's death in November 2020, a number of fundraising initiatives have been started in his honour - including an annual celebrity golf day - raising over £30,000 for Melanoma charities.
