= Jim Dempsey =

Scottish footballer and manager

Personal information
- Date of birth: 5 November 1946 (age 79)
- Place of birth: Scotland
- Position: Centre back

Youth career
- Larkhall Thistle

Senior career*
Years	Team	Apps	(Gls)
1969–1971	Hamilton Academical	26	(2)
1971–1975	Raith Rovers	93	(6)
1975–1976	Stirling Albion	30	(2)
1976–1981	Hamilton Academical	112	(3)
1981	Albion Rovers	9	(0)
1981–?	Larkhall Thistle	?	(?)

Managerial career
- 1988–1989: Hamilton Academical
- 1992-?: Fauldhouse United
- * Club domestic league appearances and goals

Jim Dempsey (born 5 November 1946) is a Scottish former football player and manager.

As a player Dempsey, who was known as a hard man, was most associated with Hamilton Academical, with whom he had two spells, and Raith Rovers, although he also turned out for Stirling Albion, Albion Rovers and Larkhall Thistle.

He had a sole season back as manager at Hamilton, following the departure of John Lambie to Partick Thistle, although the club finished far adrift at the foot of the Scottish Premier Division and he was dismissed. He was subsequently announced as manager of Fauldhouse United in 1992 and later returned to the Accies as assistant boss under Chris Hillcoat in 2003.
