= Rosario Rampanti =

Italian footballer (born 1949)

Personal information
- Date of birth: 13 March 1949 (age 77)
- Place of birth: Carbonia, Italy
- Position: Midfielder

Senior career*
Years	Team	Apps	(Gls)
1968–1974	Torino	112	(8)
1969–1970	→ Pisa (loan)		
1974–1975	Napoli	23	(2)
1975–1979	Bologna		
1977–1978	→ Brescia (loan)		
1979	APIA Leichhardt		
1979–1982	SPAL		

Managerial career
- 1986–1987: Benevento
- 1987–1988: Lodigiani
- 1988–1989: Arezzo
- 1994: Torino
- 1997–1998: Vallée d'Aoste
- * Club domestic league appearances and goals

Rosario Rampanti (born 13 March 1949) is an Italian retired football player and manager who played as a midfielder.

== Career ==
Rampanti started his senior career with Torino in the Serie A, where he made one-hundred and twelve league appearances and scored eight goals. After that, he played for S.S.C. Napoli, Bologna 1909, Brescia Calcio, APIA Leichhardt, S.P.A.L., and Real Cerretese.
