= Eric Carruthers (footballer) =

Scottish footballer

Personal information
- Full name: Eric Carruthers
- Date of birth: 2 February 1953 (age 73)
- Place of birth: Edinburgh, Scotland
- Height: 5 ft 8 in (1.73 m)
- Position: Forward

Youth career
- Firhill School
- Salvesen Boys Club
- 1968–1969: Heart of Midlothian

Senior career*
Years	Team	Apps	(Gls)
1969–1975	Heart of Midlothian	58	(9)
1975–1977	Derby County	1	(0)
1978	West Adelaide	5	(1)
1979	APIA Leichhardt	20	(0)
- * Club domestic league appearances and goals

Eric Carruthers (born 2 February 1953 in Edinburgh) is a Scottish former footballer who played most notably for Heart of Midlothian.

Carruthers began his professional career for Hearts in 1970 and played more than fifty league matches between 1970 and 1975.

Carruthers was in 1975 sold by Hearts to English team Derby County for £25,000. His stay at Derby County was largely unsuccessful as he managed only one appearance as a substitute in two seasons. He eventually was released on a free transfer in October 1977.

In 1979, he played twenty matches for Australian National Soccer League team A.P.I.A. Leichhardt.
