= Sebastian Giampaolo =

Australian soccer player

Personal information
- Full name: Sebastian Giampaolo
- Date of birth: 8 January 1959 (age 67)
- Position: Striker

Youth career
- Inter Monaro

Senior career*
| Years | Team | Apps | (Gls) |
| 1981–1985 | A.P.I.A. Leichhardt | ? | (?) |
| 1985–1986 | Inter Monaro | 26 | (7) |
| 1989–1990 | Heidelberg United | 2 | (0) |
| 1991-2003 | Canberra Olympic | | |

International career^{‡}
| 1978–1981 | Australia | 2 | (0) |
- * Club domestic league appearances and goals ‡ National team caps and goals as of 14 July 2011

Sebastian Giampaolo (born 8 January 1959) is an Australian former association football player.

== Personal life ==
Sebatstian grew up in Queanbeyan, born to Italian parents who immigrated from San Luca Calabria

== Playing career ==
=== Club career ===
Giampaolo played for APIA, Inter Monaro and Heidelberg in the National Soccer League during the 1980s.

He made two appearances for Canberra Olympic during 2003.

=== International career ===
Giampaolo played two matches for Australia. The first match was in 1978 against Greece in Sydney and the second in 1981 against New Zealand.

== Honours ==
In 2009 Giampaolo was inducted into the Capital Football Hall of Fame.
