= Terry Butler (soccer) =

Australian former soccer player

Personal information
- Position: Winger

Senior career*
| Years | Team | Apps | (Gls) |
| 1971–76 | APIA Leichhardt | | |
| 1976–77 | Urban Services | 26 | (9) |
| 1977–88 | APIA Leichhardt | 220 | (12) |

International career
| 1972 | Australia | 2 | (1) |
| 1972–1975 | Australia B | 2 | (0) |
- * Club domestic league appearances and goals

Terry Butler is an Australian former soccer player.

== Playing career ==
=== Club career ===
Butler player for APIA Leichhardt between 1971 and 1988, apart from a short stint with Urban Services in Hong Kong.

=== International career ===
Butler played four matches for Australia, including two full international matches.
