= Peter Wilson (soccer, born 1947) =

Australian soccer player (born 1947)

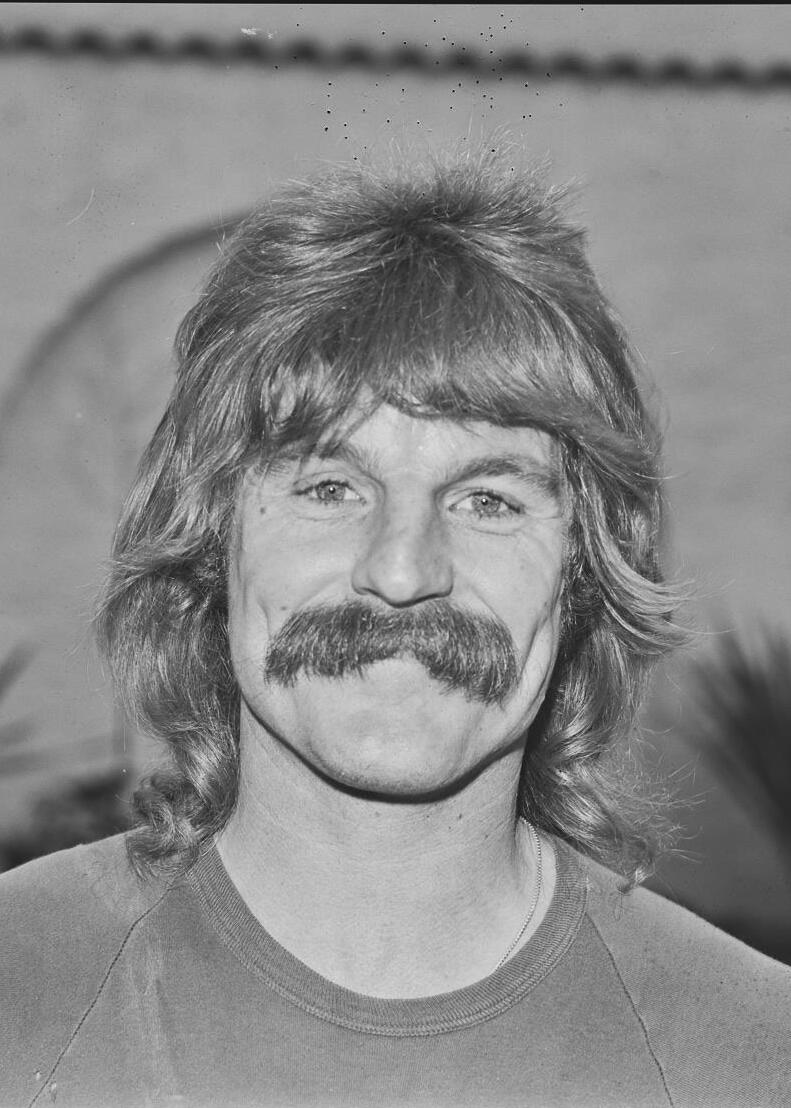
- Wilson in 1974

Personal information
- Full name: Peter Frederick Wilson
- Date of birth: 15 September 1947 (age 79)
- Place of birth: Felling, England
- Position: Sweeper

Youth career
- St. Mary's Boys Club

Senior career*
Years	Team	Apps	(Gls)
1966–1968	Middlesbrough	1	(0)
1968–1969	Gateshead	2	(0)
1969–1971	South Coast United	62	(0)
1972	Club Marconi	21	(1)
1973–1974	Safeway United	44	(0)
1975–1978	Western Suburbs	83	(3)
1979–1982	APIA Leichhardt	86	(2)
Total		299	(6)

International career
1970–1979	Australia	65	(3)

Managerial career
- 1973–1974: Safeway United
- 1982: APIA Leichhardt
- * Club domestic league appearances and goals

Peter Frederick Wilson (born 15 September 1947) is an Australian former soccer player. He was the captain of the Australian squad at the 1974 World Cup in West Germany. His nickname is "Big Willie" and his position was sweeper.

== Biography ==
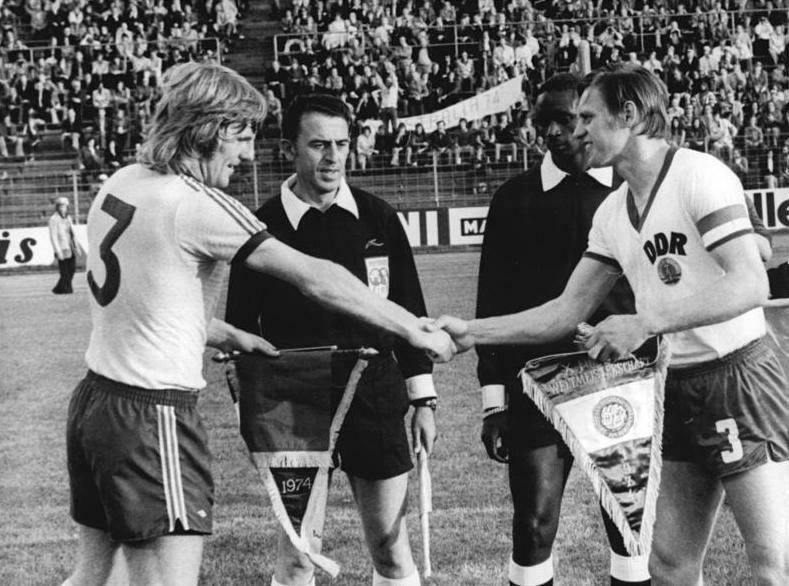
Wilson (left) shaking hands with East Germany's Bernd Bransch before their match at the 1974 FIFA World Cup

Wilson was born in England of Scottish descent. Often regarded as one of the toughest defenders in the modern era, Wilson was a dominating figure in the Australian team in the 1970s. Born in Felling, England in 1947, Wilson migrated to Australia in 1969 to join South Coast United after failing to break into the first team for English club Middlesbrough. He began his career as a full back but injury to another player switched him to sweeper where he had his biggest success.

Between 1970 and 1979, he made a then-record 116 appearances for the national team and captained Australia from 1971, including the 1974 FIFA World Cup finals. When he signed with Sydney club Western Suburbs, Wilson travelled 257 kilometres four times a week for training. He also played with Marconi and APIA Leichhardt and in later years coached South Coast and APIA.

Wilson is now living as a recluse near Wollongong in New South Wales. After not speaking publicly for more than two decades, an Australian newspaper tracked him down and reported that he was living in a small town south of Sydney. "There's nothing I want to say," he said. "I've got nothing to add."

His last match for Australia was a home friendly against Partizan Belgrade on 29 June 1979. The match ended on a 1–1 draw.

== Internationals and achievements ==
- A-Internationals: 65 (4 November 1970 – 13 June 1979)
- 60 games as captain, 3 goals
- 116 games for Australian (incl. Test games 133)
- 14 games for New South Wales (6 as captain)
- Friendship Cup tournament in Vietnam 1970
- Asia/Oceania Champion 1973
- 1974 FIFA World Cup Australian captain
