= Greg Woodhouse =

Australian soccer player

Personal information
- Full name: Greg Woodhouse
- Date of birth: 2 January 1960 (age 66)
- Position: Goalkeeper

Youth career
- Western Suburbs

Senior career*
Years	Team	Apps	(Gls)
1978	Western Suburbs	10	(0)
1979–1983	APIA Leichhardt	110	(0)
1984–1988	Sydney Croatia	32	(0)
1989	Avala		
1992	Liverpool Yugal		

International career
1979–1981	Australia	11	(0)
1979	Australia U-20	-	(-)

Managerial career
- 2000–2002: Bonnyrigg White Eagles
- 2002–2004: Canterbury-Marrickville
- 2004: MSC Liverpool
- 2004–2007: APIA Leichhardt
- * Club domestic league appearances and goals

Greg Woodhouse (born 2 January 1960) is a former soccer player. Greg grew up playing with St Paul's Bankstown and Chester Hill Presbyterian soccer clubs in the New South Wales Churches Football Association and went on to represent Australia. He made 24 appearances for the Australia national soccer team as a goalkeeper. He is currently a coach at the International Goalkeepers Academy located at Blacktown Olympic Park (run by Jim Fraser, another former Socceroo goalkeeper).

Woodhouse has recently penned a lucrative new deal signing with Minto M League as its head coach for the upcoming season.
