= Martyn Crook =

Australian soccer player and coach (1956–2008)

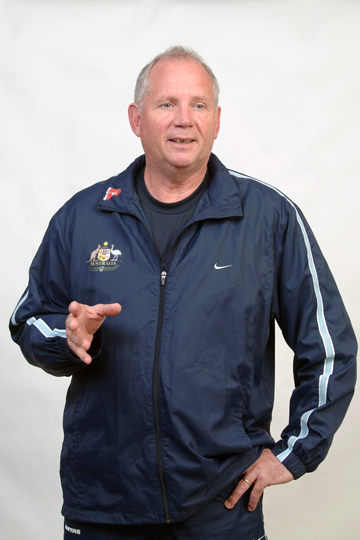

Personal information
- Full name: Martyn Arthur Crook
- Date of birth: 16 November 1956
- Place of birth: Hampton, Middlesex, England
- Date of death: 5 December 2008 (aged 52)
- Place of death: Los Angeles, United States
- Position: Goalkeeper

Youth career
- 1965–1975: Para Hills Knights

Senior career*
Years	Team	Apps	(Gls)
1976–1986	West Adelaide Hellas	192	(0)
1988–1990	Para Hills Knights	61	(0)
1994	Croydon Kings	1	(0)

International career
1979–1983	Australia	14	(0)

Managerial career
- 1991–1992: Para Hills Knights
- 1993: Croydon Kings
- 1992–1993: South Australia
- 1994–2008: SASI
- 2007–2008: Australia U-17
- * Club domestic league appearances and goals

Martyn Crook (16 November 1956 – 5 December 2008) was a British-born Australian soccer coach and former representative player.

== Early life ==
Martyn Crook was born in Middlesex, England, on 16 November 1956, the second son of Arthur (1920 - 2014) and Elsie (1931- 2013)(née Laidler) Crook. Arthur was a former top amateur player for Walton and Hersham FC and Kingstonian FC in England. The family lived in Shepperton, prior to emigrating to Australia in 1964 settling in Adelaide, South Australia.

== Career ==
=== Playing ===
As a goalkeeper, he played for Para Hills SC from 1965 until he departed for Adelaide Hellas ten years later, playing in league and cup winning sides throughout his time there. He was a member of the Senior team from 1972. During his time at the club, he represented South Australia at the Under 14's and Under 16's level, winning the National Championship in 1972, as well as the Far North Zone from the Under 12 level. He was also a member of the Para Hills Primary School team which won the Referees' Cup in 1967.

He was a member of the SA League and Ampol Cup winning side at Adelaide Hellas in 1976, before playing for West Adelaide SC when the National Soccer league commenced in 1977. In 1978 West Adelaide won the Phillips League National championship and Martyn played with the club 192 times before returning to play at Para Hills in 1987.

Martyn represented the Australian national team fourteen times at the national level, and was a member of the Merlion Cup winning side in 1982 which beat South Korea in the final. He also represented South Australia eight times at a senior level.

=== Coaching ===
In 1990, following his retirement due to a back injury, he became assistant coach at Para Hills SC, becoming head coach for the 1991 and 1992 seasons. He then moved to coach Polonia (now Croydon) for the 1993 season. In 1992 and 1993 he was the South Australian State coach as well.

In 1994, he became the head coach of the South Australian Sports Institute National Training Centre, in 1999 becoming the Technical Director, a position which he held until his death. He was responsible for 31 Youth International & 17 AIS Scholarships passing through SASI NTC during his tenure.

At a national level, he was the technical assistant for the Australia national under-17 football team (known as the 'Joeys') World Cup team in 1999, Olympic Team goalkeeper coach in 2000, and then became assistant coach for the Under 17's from 2000 until 2005 in three separate campaigns in Trinidad, Finland and Peru. In 2007, he was appointed as the head coach for the Joeys.

== Honours ==
In 2006, Martyn was inducted into the FFSA Hall of Fame in the Roll of Honour as a member for Distinguished Contribution. In 2010, he was posthumously inducted into the Football Federation Australia's Hall of Fame.

== Death ==
He died of a suspected heart attack on 5 December 2008, just before the team was scheduled to play the USA Under-17 in an international junior tournament. He was 52.

== The Martyn Crook Foundation ==
In 2009, Martyn's family established The Martyn Crook Foundation (MCF) (www.tmcf.org.au)to assist in the advancement of Association Football in Australia and to encourage young football players and coaches with ambition to realise their full potential regardless of their race, gender or financial standing, at all levels of the game. A partnership has been established with Adelaide United FC that supports the development of outstanding talent in young Australian players, with a grassroots program to assist at all other levels.

The foundation relies on the support of individuals and organizations, both private and public, to continue its work. Through its board of trustees, the foundation supports such activities as it believes to be in tune with the foundation's objectives.
