= Vic Bozanic =

Australian former association footballer

Personal information
- Date of birth: 30 October 1957 (age 68)
- Place of birth: Adelaide, Australia
- Position: Defender

Senior career*
Years	Team	Apps	(Gls)
1977	Polonia		
1978–1981	West Adelaide	90	(7)
1982–1983	Marconi	53	(10)
1984	APIA	20	(4)
1985	St George	17	(4)
1986–1987	APIA	24	(2)
1992	Central Coast		

International career
1980	Australia	1	(1)
- * Club domestic league appearances and goals

Vic Bozanic (Croatian: Vic Božanić; born 30 October 1957) is an Australian former association footballer. He is the father of Oliver Bozanic who has also played for the Australia national association football team.

== Playing career ==
=== Club career ===
Bozanic played for Polonia Adelaide before moving to West Adelaide in the National Soccer League, where he scored what would become the championship winning goal in the last game of the 1978 season against Adelaide City.

He later played for NSL clubs APIA and St George.

=== International career ===
Bozanic played one full international match for Australia against Papua New Guinea at the 1980 OFC Nations Cup. He played three matches for Australia at the tournament (only the match against PNG was a full international match), scoring two goals including a goal in the final against Tahiti.

== Honours ==
=== International ===
Australia

- NSL Championship: 1978
- OFC Nations Cup: 1980
