= Lambert Park (Leichhardt) =

Soccer stadium in New South Wales, Australia

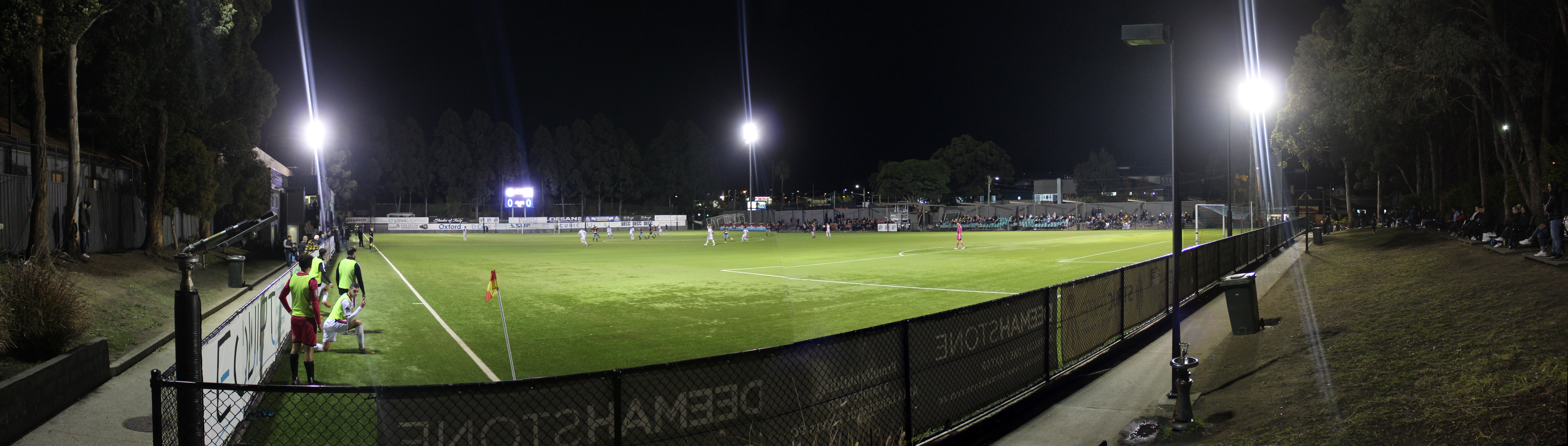
- Lambert Park in August 2019
- Interactive map of Lambert Park
- Location: Leichhardt, New South Wales
- Coordinates: 33.88466°S 151.14604°E
- Capacity: 7,000 (2,000 seated)

Construction
- Opened: 1954

Tenants
- APIA Leichhardt (NPL NSW); Wests APIA (Australian Championship)

Lambert Park is a purpose-built soccer stadium in Leichhardt, New South Wales, Australia. It is the home ground of APIA Leichhardt, and has been since the clubs inception.

The stadium is peculiar in that it runs east to west, rather than north to south. The stadium has a nominal capacity of 7000, with 2000 seated in two main stands on either side of the playing field. In the southern of these stands there are dressing room facilities, a social club with views of the game, press facilities and media facilities. The northern stand runs the full length of the playing field, seating around 1200 spectators in 8 rows. This stand is regularly full for New South Wales Premier League encounters, with attendances at the ground in the last few seasons ranging from 800 to 3000 spectators. The western and eastern ends behind the goals are hilled, bringing the ground capacity to around 6000 spectators.

In March, 2011 as part of the campaign from the NSW Liberal Party ahead of the 2011 New South Wales state election leader Barry O'Farrell promised $2.2 million would be spent upgrading Lambert Park. This would include a new Synthetic playing field, installation of a new perimeter fence, a new club house including bigger dressing rooms for players and officials.

On 22 March 2014, the promised upgrades were completed and unveiled at a derby match between APIA Leichhardt and Marconi Stallions. The total spend was more than $3.5 million, with almost $1.4 million of private investment boosting the $2.2 million of government funding.
