= Tony Boskovic =

Australian soccer referee (1933–2022)

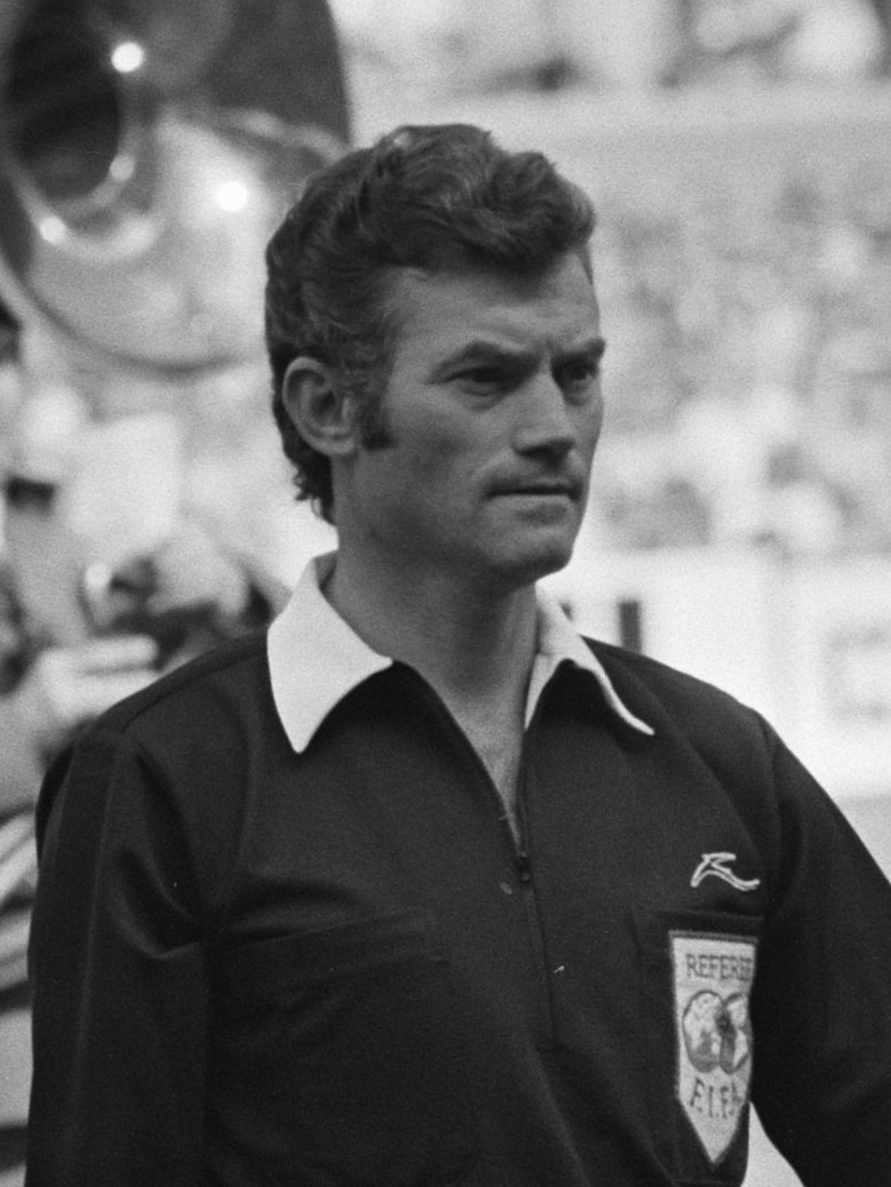
- Boskovic in 1974
- Full name: Anton Boskovic
- Born: 27 January 1933; Blato, Kingdom of Yugoslavia
- Died: 16 June 2022 (aged 89)

Domestic
Years	League	Role
1977–1983	National Soccer League	Referee

International
Years	League	Role
1967–1983	FIFA listed	Referee

Anton "Tony" Boskovic (27 January 1933 – 16 June 2022) was an Australian soccer referee.

== Career ==
Born in Blato, Croatia, Yugoslavia, he emigrated to Australia from the former Yugoslavia in 1955.

Boskovic is known for having refereed two matches in the FIFA World Cup, one in 1974 and one in 1982. He was inducted into the Football Federation Australia Hall of Fame in 1999.

In 1982 Boskovic was invited by the Australian Government to join an independent migration review panel.

Boskovic died on 16 June 2022, at the age of 89.
