= Phil O'Connor =

Footballer (1953–1985)

Personal information
- Full name: Philip Kelvin O'Connor
- Date of birth: 10 October 1953
- Place of birth: Romford, England
- Date of death: 23 September 1985 (aged 31)
- Place of death: Australia
- Position: Midfielder

Senior career*
Years	Team	Apps	(Gls)
1970–1971	Southend United	0	(0)
- Bexley United
1972–1975	Luton Town	2	(0)
1974–1975	→ Lincoln City (loan)	4	(1)
1975	Balgownie Rangers		
1976	Wollongong City		
1977	St George		
1980–1981	A.P.I.A. Leichhardt		
1984–1985	Blacktown City		

International career
1976–1984	Australia	20	(5)
- * Club domestic league appearances and goals

Phil O'Connor (10 October 1953 – 23 September 1985) was a footballer who played as a midfielder. Born in England, he emigrated to Australia during his career and made 20 appearances for the Australia national team scoring give goals.

== Career ==
O'Connor began his career as an apprentice with Southend United before dropping into the non-league ranks with Bexley United. In 1972, he returned to the Football League with Luton Town. After a loan spell with Lincoln City in the 1974–75 season, O'Connor emigrated to Australia. He quickly made his way into the Australia national team, making his debut against Hong Kong on 11 August 1976 and going on to appear a total of 20 times scoring 5 goals, which included three appearances against England in 1983.

A fee of $7,000 saw him move from St George to A.P.I.A. Leichhardt for the 1980 National Soccer League season, netting a 14th minute debut goal in the club's 2–1 over Adelaide City at Lambert Park on 9 March 1980. After two seasons, he moved on to join Wollongong Wolves for the 1982 National Soccer League season. On 23 September 1985, O'Connor died in a car accident when his bread van veered off the Appin Road and hit a tree, killing him instantly.
