= 1978 St George-Budapest FC season =

St George-Budapest
1978 season
- Head Coach: Ilija Takac; Joe Vlasits
- Stadium: St George Stadium; Garside Park
- National Soccer League: 7th
- NSL Cup: Second round
- Top goalscorer: League: Phil O'Connor (12); All: Phil O'Connor (12)
- Highest home attendance: 4,953 vs. Brisbane Lions (16 July 1978); National Soccer League
- Lowest home attendance: 722 vs. APIA Leichhardt (17 May 1978); NSL Cup
- Average home league attendance: 2,534
- Biggest win: 4–1 (3 times)
- Biggest defeat: 2–5 vs. South Melbourne (A) (10 June 1978); National Soccer League

The 1978 season was the second in the National Soccer League for St George-Budapest (now St George Football Club). In addition to the domestic league, they also participated in the NSL Cup.

== Players ==
Note: Flags indicate national team as defined under FIFA eligibility rules; some limited exceptions apply. Players may hold more than one non-FIFA nationality.

No.	Pos.	Nation	Player
1	GK	AUS	Martin Coe
2	DF	AUS	Doug Utjesenovic
3	MF	ENG	Ralph Coates
4	DF	AUS	John O'Shea
5	DF	AUS	George Harris
6		AUS	Brendan Grosse
7		AUS	Carlos Mendez
9	DF	AUS	Robbie O'Shea
10		AUS	Neville Morgan
11	FW	AUS	Phil O'Connor
12		AUS	Emery Holmik
13	DF	AUS	Peter Terry
14		AUS	Zoran Durisic
15		AUS	Paul Jones

No.	Pos.	Nation	Player
17	FW	ENG	Peter Hensman
18	DF	AUS	Mike O'Shea
20	GK	AUS	Tim Patterson
21	GK	ENG	Ray Clemence
22	MF	AUS	Paul Kay
—	FW	PAR	Isadore Acosta
—	MF	AUS	Mark Barton
—	MF	AUS	Mike Dale
—	MF	AUS	Rudolfo Gnavi
—		AUS	David Jirsa
—	DF	AUS	Michael Rendell
—	DF	PAR	Herminio Toñánez
—		AUS	Jim Vlassis

== Competitions ==
=== Overall record ===
Competition	First match	Last match	Starting round	Final position	Record							
Competition	First match	Last match	Starting round	Final position	Pld	W	D	L	GF	GA	GD	Win %
National Soccer League	5 March 1978	27 August 1978	Matchday 1	7th	26	11	3	12	41	40	+1	42.31
NSL Cup	17 May 1978	19 July 1978	First round	Second round	2	1	0	1	2	2	+0	50.00
Total					28	12	3	13	43	42	+1	42.86

Source: Competitions

=== National Soccer League ===
==== League table ====
Pos	Team	Pld	W	D	L	GF	GA	GD	Pts
5	Fitzroy United	26	9	8	9	39	39	0	26
6	Brisbane Lions	26	8	10	8	37	39	−2	26
7	St George-Budapest	26	11	3	12	41	40	+1	25
8	Sydney Olympic	26	9	7	10	35	43	−8	25
9	Western Suburbs	26	9	6	11	41	45	−4	24

Source: rsssf.com
Rules for classification: 1) Points; 2) Goal difference; 3) Goals scored

==== Results summary ====
Overall								Home						Away					
Pld	W	D	L	GF	GA	GD	Pts	W	D	L	GF	GA	GD	W	D	L	GF	GA	GD
26	11	3	12	41	40	+1	36	7	1	5	20	17	+3	4	2	7	21	23	−2

Source: worldfootball.net

==== Results by round ====
Round	1	2	4	3	5	6	7	8	9	10	11	12	13	14	15	16	17	18	19	20	21	22	23	24	25	26
Ground	H	A	A	H	A	H	A	H	A	H	A	H	A	H	A	A	H	H	A	H	A	H	A	H	A	H
Result	L	W	L	W	L	L	D	W	L	W	L	L	L	L	L	D	W	L	W	D	W	W	W	W	L	W
Position	12	6	6	5	9	9	12	9	12	8	11	14	14	14	14	14	13	13	13	13	11	11	9	8	9	7
Points	0	2	2	4	4	4	5	7	7	9	9	9	9	9	9	10	12	12	14	15	17	19	21	23	23	25

Source: worldfootball.net
A = Away; H = Home; W = Win; D = Draw; L = Loss

==== Matches ====
Win Draw Loss

5 March 1978 1	St George-Budapest	0–2	South Melbourne	Sydney
		Report	Cummings 20'; Rogers 50'	Stadium: St George Stadium; Attendance: 3,853; Referee: Tony Boskovic

12 March 1978 2	West Adelaide	1–4	St George-Budapest	Adelaide
	McGachey 59'	Report	R. O'Shea 37'; J. O'Shea 61'; O'Connor 62'; Jones 81'	Stadium: Hindmarsh Stadium; Attendance: 5,233; Referee: Jim Johnston

26 March 1978 4	Adelaide City	1–0	St George-Budapest	Adelaide
	Grosse 39' (o.g.)	Report		Stadium: Olympic Sports Field; Attendance: 5,800; Referee: Dennis Stanley

27 March 1978 3	St George-Budapest	2–1	Canberra City	Sydney
	O'Connor 43'; Hensman 61'	Report	Heywood 22'	Stadium: St George Stadium; Attendance: 2,533; Referee: Peter Rampley

2 April 1978 5	Sydney Olympic	2–0	St George-Budapest	Sydney
	Ainslie 3'; Laing 57'	Report		Stadium: Arlington Oval; Attendance: 4,629; Referee: Henry Witschge

9 April 1978 6	St George-Budapest	2–3	Newcastle KB United	Sydney
	O'Connor 13'; Jones 73'	Report	Endacott 16'; Boden 42'; Harris 72' (o.g.)	Stadium: St George Stadium; Attendance: 1,637; Referee: Doug Rennie

15 April 1978 7	Brisbane Lions	0–0	St George-Budapest	Brisbane
		Report		Stadium: Perry Park; Attendance: 3,000; Referee: Dave Nugent

23 April 1978 8	St George-Budapest	2–0	Fitzroy United	Sydney
	O'Connor 36' (pen.), 76' (pen.)	Report		Stadium: St George Stadium; Attendance: 2,160; Referee: Barry Wilkinson

29 April 1978 9	Footscray JUST	2–0	St George-Budapest	Melbourne
	Palinkas 13'; Ristovski 86'	Report		Stadium: Middle Park Soccer Stadium; Attendance: 2,500; Referee: Chris Bambridge

7 May 1978 10	St George-Budapest	2–0	Brisbane City	Sydney
	Gnavi 46'; Durisic 83'	Report		Stadium: St George Stadium; Attendance: 2,005; Referee: Tony Boskovic

14 May 1978 11	Marconi Fairfield	2–1	St George-Budapest	Sydney
	Sharne 44'; Jankovics 46'	Report	O'Connor 46'	Stadium: Marconi Oval; Attendance: 8,093; Referee: Jim Reeves

21 May 1978 12	St George-Budapest	1–3	Eastern Suburbs	Sydney
	Mendez 42'	Report	H. Silva 57'; Watson 65'; Trenter 90+3'	Stadium: St George Stadium; Attendance: 1,200; Referee: Brian Fowler

28 May 1978 13	Western Suburbs	2–1	St George-Budapest	Sydney
	Vernon 51', 77'	Report	Morgan 55'	Stadium: Wentworth Park; Attendance: 5,928; Referee: Richard Lorenc

4 June 1978 14	St George-Budapest	0–1	West Adelaide	Sydney
		Report	Kambas 4' (pen.)	Stadium: St George Stadium; Attendance: 3,254; Referee: Henry Witschge

10 June 1978 15	South Melbourne	5–2	St George-Budapest	Melbourne
	Hagegmanouil ?'; Cummings ?'; O'Connor ?'; Rogers ?'; Christopoulos ?'	Report	Morgan ?'; Hensman ?'	Stadium: Middle Park Soccer Stadium; Attendance: 4,000; Referee: Jack Readshaw

17 June 1978 16	Canberra City	1–1	St George-Budapest	Canberra
	Grujicic 29' (pen.)	Report	Coates 33'	Stadium: Bruce Stadium; Attendance: 4,500; Referee: Tony Beazleigh

25 June 1978 17	St George-Budapest	2–1	Adelaide City	Sydney
	O'Connor 19'; Hensman 79'	Report	Northcote 12'	Stadium: St George Stadium; Attendance: 2,452; Referee: Peter Rampley

2 July 1978 18	St George-Budapest	1–2	Sydney Olympic	Sydney
	Hensman 35'	Report	Jamieson 50'; Ainslie 90'	Stadium: St George Stadium; Attendance: 963; Referee: Tim Davies

8 July 1978 19	Newcastle KB United	1–2	St George-Budapest	Newcastle
	Summerscales 49'	Report	Willis 6' (o.g.); O'Shea 24'	Stadium: Newcastle International Sports Centre; Attendance: 10,197; Referee: Doug Rennie

16 July 1978 20	St George-Budapest	2–2	Brisbane Lions	Sydney
	Morgan 7'; Grosse 85'	Report	Hughes 18', 63'	Stadium: St George Stadium; Attendance: 4,953; Referee: Bill Jones

23 July 1978 21	Fitzroy United	1–4	St George-Budapest	Melbourne
	Cole 42'	Report	Grosse 12'; Terry 35'; Hensman 75'; Coates 90+1'	Stadium: Middle Park Soccer Stadium; Attendance: 3,000; Referee: Tony Beazleigh

30 July 1978 22	St George-Budapest	3–1	Footscray JUST	Sydney
	O'Shea 18'; O'Connor 46', 61'	Report	McGuinness 84'	Stadium: St George Stadium; Attendance: 3,676; Referee: Henry Witschge

6 August 1978 23	Brisbane City	1–4	St George-Budapest	Brisbane
	Kelso 60'	Report	Hensman 37'; O'Connor 41', 53'; Morgan 49'	Stadium: Perry Park; Attendance: 2,500; Referee: Jack Wood

13 August 1978 24	St George-Budapest	2–1	Marconi Fairfield	Sydney
15:00 AEST	Morgan 2'; Coates 24'	Report	Vieri 56'	Stadium: St George Stadium; Attendance: 3,234; Referee: Peter Rampley

20 August 1978 25	Eastern Suburbs	4–2	St George-Budapest	Sydney
	Grosse 22' (o.g.); Stevenson 26'; Smith 62', 82'	Report	Morgan 25'; O'Connor 46'	Stadium: Wentworth Park; Attendance: 2,747; Referee: Jim Reeves

27 August 1978 26	St George-Budapest	1–0	Western Suburbs	Sydney
	Utjesenovic 16'	Report		Stadium: St George Stadium; Attendance: 1,025; Referee: Bill Jones

=== NSL Cup ===
Win Draw Loss

17 May 1978 First round	St George-Budapest	2–1	(New South Wales) APIA Leichhardt	Sydney
	J. O'Shea 35'; Hensman 84'	Report	Jack 77'	Stadium: Garside Park; Attendance: 722

19 July 1978 Second round	Western Suburbs	1–0	St George-Budapest	Sydney
	Eaton 4'	Report		Stadium: Wentworth Park; Attendance: 1,023; Referee: Henry Witschge

== Statistics ==
=== Appearances and goals ===
Includes all competitions. Players with no appearances not included in the list.

No.	Pos.	Nat.	Player	National Soccer League		NSL Cup		Total	
No.	Pos.	Nat.	Player	Apps	Goals	Apps	Goals	Apps	Goals
1	GK	(Australia)	Martin Coe	24	0	2	0	26	0
2	DF	(Australia)	Doug Utjesenovic	20	1	1	0	21	1
3	MF	(England)	Ralph Coates	11	3	1	0	12	3
4	DF	(Australia)	John O'Shea	25	3	2	1	27	4
5	DF	(Australia)	George Harris	25	0	2	0	27	0
6	—	(Australia)	Brendan Grosse	25	2	2	0	27	2
7	—	(Australia)	Carlos Mendez	8+1	1	1	0	10	1
9	DF	(Australia)	Robbie O'Shea	14+2	1	1	0	17	1
10	—	(Australia)	Neville Morgan	25+1	6	2	0	28	6
11	FW	(Australia)	Phil O'Connor	24+1	12	2	0	27	12
12	—	(Australia)	Emery Holmik	3+3	0	0	0	6	0
13	DF	(Australia)	Peter Terry	18+3	1	1	0	22	1
14	—	(Australia)	Zoran Durisic	4+7	1	0	0	11	1
15	—	(Australia)	Paul Jones	15+1	2	2	0	18	2
17	FW	(England)	Peter Hensman	17+4	6	1+1	1	23	7
18	DF	(Australia)	Mike O'Shea	6+2	0	0	0	8	0
20	GK	(Australia)	Tim Patterson	0	0	0+1	0	1	0
21	GK	(England)	Ray Clemence	2	0	0	0	2	0
22	MF	(Australia)	Paul Kay	3+4	0	0	0	7	0
—	FW	(Paraguay)	Isadore Acosta	0+1	0	1	0	2	0
—	MF	(Australia)	Mark Barton	1	0	0	0	1	0
—	MF	(Australia)	Mike Dale	0+1	0	0	0	1	0
—	MF	(Australia)	Rudolfo Gnavi	11+2	1	0	0	13	1
—	—	(Australia)	David Jirsa	0	0	1	0	1	0
—	DF	(Australia)	Michael Rendell	1	0	1	0	2	0
—	DF	(Paraguay)	Herminio Toñánez	4	0	0	0	4	0
—	—	(Australia)	Jim Vlassis	0+1	0	0	0	1	0
—	—	(Australia)	Watson	0	0	0+1	0	1	0

=== Disciplinary record ===
Includes all competitions. The list is sorted by squad number when total cards are equal. Players with no cards not included in the list.

Rank	No.	Pos.	Nat.	Player	National Soccer League			NSL Cup			Total		
Rank	No.	Pos.	Nat.	Player	Yellow card	Second yellow card	Red card	Yellow card	Second yellow card	Red card	Yellow card	Second yellow card	Red card
1	5	DF	(Australia)	George Harris	4	0	0	0	0	0	4	0	0
2	—	MF	(Australia)	Rudolfo Gnavi	3	0	0	0	0	0	3	0	0
3	2	DF	(Australia)	Doug Utjesenovic	1	0	0	0	0	0	1	0	0
3	6	—	(Australia)	Brendan Grosse	1	0	0	0	0	0	1	0	0
3	17	FW	(Australia)	Doug Utjesenovic	1	0	0	0	0	0	1	0	0
3	—	DF	(Australia)	John O'Shea	1	0	0	0	0	0	1	0	0
Total					11	0	0	0	0	0	11	0	0

=== Clean sheets ===
Includes all competitions. The list is sorted by squad number when total clean sheets are equal. Numbers in parentheses represent games where both goalkeepers participated and both kept a clean sheet; the number in parentheses is awarded to the goalkeeper who was substituted on, whilst a full clean sheet is awarded to the goalkeeper who was on the field at the start of play. Goalkeepers with no clean sheets not included in the list.

Rank	No.	Nat.	Goalkeeper	NSL	NSL Cup	Total
1	1	(Australia)	Martin Coe	4	0	4
Total				4	0	4
