= 1979 St George-Budapest FC season =

St George-Budapest
1979 season
- Head Coach: Josef Gelei; Raul Blanco
- Stadium: St George Stadium
- National Soccer League: 11th
- NSL Cup: Runners-up
- Top goalscorer: League: Roy Cotton; Phil O'Connor (7 each); All: Phil O'Connor (10)
- Highest home attendance: 3,874 vs. Sydney Olympic (17 June 1979); National Soccer League
- Lowest home attendance: 1,783 vs. Sydney City (1 April 1979); National Soccer League
- Average home league attendance: 2,493
- Biggest win: 6–2 vs. Ipswich United (H) (25 April 1979); NSL Cup
- Biggest defeat: 0–5 vs. Sydney City (H) (1 April 1979); National Soccer League

The 1979 season was the third in the National Soccer League for St George-Budapest (now St George Football Club). In addition to the domestic league, they also participated in the NSL Cup. St George-Budapest finished 11th in their National Soccer League season, and were eliminated in the Final of the NSL Cup.

== Players ==
Note: Flags indicate national team as defined under FIFA eligibility rules; some limited exceptions apply. Players may hold more than one non-FIFA nationality.

| No. | Pos. | Nation | Player |
|---|---|---|---|
| 1 | GK | AUS | Martin Coe |
| 2 | DF | AUS | Doug Utjesenovic |
| 3 | DF | AUS | George Harris |
| 4 | DF | AUS | Peter Terry |
| 5 | DF | AUS | Robbie O'Shea |
| 6 | | AUS | Brendan Grosse |
| 7 | FW | ENG | Peter Hensman |
| 8 | DF | AUS | John O'Shea |
| 9 | | AUS | Stefan Matic |
| 10 | MF | ENG | Roy Cotton |
| 11 | FW | AUS | Phil O'Connor |
| 12 | GK | AUS | Mike Fraser |

| No. | Pos. | Nation | Player |
|---|---|---|---|
| 13 | DF | AUS | Mike O'Shea |
| 14 | | ENG | Nick Fenoughty |
| 15 | DF | ARG | Rudi Della Picca |
| 16 | | AUS | Tom Mihajlovic |
| 18 | | AUS | Neville Morgan |
| 19 | MF | AUS | Mark Barton |
| 20 | MF | AUS | Rudolfo Gnavi |
| 21 | MF | AUS | Paul Kay |
| 22 | MF | AUS | Peter Katholos |
| 25 | | AUS | Emery Holmik |
| — | DF | AUS | Nigel Groome |

== Competitions ==
=== Overall record ===
| Competition | First match | Last match | Starting round | Final position | Record | | | | | | | |
| Competition | First match | Last match | Starting round | Final position | Pld | W | D | L | GF | GA | GD | Win % |
|---|---|---|---|---|---|---|---|---|---|---|---|---|
| National Soccer League | 12 March 1979 | 23 August 1979 | Matchday 1 | 11th | 26 | 7 | 6 | 13 | 27 | 43 | −16 | 26.92 |
| NSL Cup | 25 April 1979 | 30 September 1979 | First round | Runners-up | 5 | 2 | 2 | 1 | 12 | 8 | +4 | 40.00 |
| Total | | | | | 31 | 9 | 8 | 14 | 39 | 51 | −12 | 29.03 |

Source: Competitions

=== National Soccer League ===
==== League table ====
| Pos | Team | Pld | W | D | L | GF | GA | GD | Pts | Qualification or relegation |
|---|---|---|---|---|---|---|---|---|---|---|
| 1 | Marconi Fairfield (C) | 26 | 15 | 6 | 5 | 58 | 32 | +26 | 40 (Note: A Bonus Point was awarded for victories of 4 goals or more.) | Qualification to Finals series (Note: The Finals series was not considered the championship for the 1979 National Soccer League.) |
| 2 | Heidelberg United | 26 | 14 | 7 | 5 | 44 | 30 | +14 | 36 | Qualification to Finals series |
| 3 | Sydney City | 26 | 15 | 3 | 8 | 47 | 29 | +18 | 34 | Qualification to Finals series |
| 4 | Brisbane City | 26 | 14 | 5 | 7 | 38 | 30 | +8 | 34 | Qualification to Finals series |
| 5 | Adelaide City | 26 | 13 | 6 | 7 | 43 | 27 | +16 | 33 | |
| 6 | Newcastle KB United | 26 | 11 | 9 | 6 | 43 | 30 | +13 | 32 | |
| 7 | West Adelaide | 26 | 10 | 4 | 12 | 28 | 31 | −3 | 25 | |
| 8 | APIA Leichhardt | 26 | 11 | 3 | 12 | 29 | 37 | −8 | 25 | |
| 9 | Brisbane Lions | 26 | 8 | 6 | 12 | 28 | 40 | −12 | 22 | |
| 10 | Footscray JUST | 26 | 8 | 3 | 15 | 29 | 43 | −14 | 20 | |
| 11 | St George-Budapest | 26 | 7 | 6 | 13 | 27 | 43 | −16 | 20 | |
| 12 | Canberra City | 26 | 6 | 8 | 12 | 25 | 41 | −16 | 20 | |
| 13 | Sydney Olympic (R) | 26 | 7 | 5 | 14 | 23 | 30 | −7 | 19 | Relegated to the 1980 NSW State League |
| 14 | South Melbourne | 26 | 6 | 3 | 17 | 26 | 45 | −19 | 16 | |

Updated to match(es) played on unknown. Source: rsssf.com
Rules for classification: 1) points; 2) goal difference; 3) number of goals scored.
(C) Champions; (R) Relegated

==== Results summary ====
| Overall | | | | | | | | Home | | | | | | Away | | | | | |
| Pld | W | D | L | GF | GA | GD | Pts | W | D | L | GF | GA | GD | W | D | L | GF | GA | GD |
|---|---|---|---|---|---|---|---|---|---|---|---|---|---|---|---|---|---|---|---|
| 26 | 7 | 6 | 13 | 27 | 43 | −16 | 27 | 3 | 4 | 6 | 13 | 21 | −8 | 4 | 2 | 7 | 14 | 22 | −8 |

Source: worldfootball.net

==== Results by round ====
| Round | 1 | 2 | 3 | 4 | 5 | 6 | 7 | 8 | 9 | 10 | 11 | 12 | 13 | 14 | 16 | 17 | 18 | 19 | 20 | 21 | 22 | 15 | 23 | 24 | 25 | 26 |
|---|---|---|---|---|---|---|---|---|---|---|---|---|---|---|---|---|---|---|---|---|---|---|---|---|---|---|
| Ground | A | H | A | H | A | H | H | A | H | A | H | A | H | A | A | H | H | A | A | H | A | H | H | A | H | A |
| Result | L | L | W | L | L | L | L | L | W | L | L | L | W | D | L | D | D | D | W | W | W | D | L | L | D | W |
| Position | 12 | 12 | 12 | 13 | 13 | 13 | 13 | 14 | 14 | 14 | 14 | 14 | 14 | 14 | 14 | 13 | 14 | 14 | 13 | 13 | 13 | 14 | 13 | 13 | 13 | 11 |
| Points | 0 | 0 | 2 | 2 | 2 | 2 | 2 | 2 | 4 | 4 | 4 | 4 | 6 | 7 | 7 | 8 | 9 | 10 | 12 | 14 | 16 | 17 | 17 | 17 | 18 | 20 |

Source: worldfootball.net
A = Away; H = Home; W = Win; D = Draw; L = Loss

==== Matches ====
Win Draw Loss

| 12 March 1979 1 | Heidelberg United | 1–0 | St George-Budapest | Melbourne |
| | Cole 60' | Report | | Stadium: Olympic Park; Attendance: 5,000; Referee: Nick Karlich |

| 18 March 1979 2 | St George-Budapest | 2–4 | Canberra City | Sydney |
| | O'Connor 31'; Morgan 51' | Report | Stark 3', 26'; Salgado 6'; Moulis 74' | Stadium: St George Stadium; Attendance: 2,250; Referee: Henry Witschge |

| 25 March 1979 3 | Brisbane Lions | 2–3 | St George-Budapest | Brisbane |
| | Hughes 7'; Amos 31' | Report | J. O'Shea 55', 76'; O'Connor 89' (pen.) | Stadium: Perry Park; Attendance: 1,520; Referee: Ken Allen |

| 1 April 1979 4 | St George-Budapest | 0–5 | Sydney City | Sydney |
| | | Report | Smith 31', 56', 75'; Stevenson 25'; Barnes 63' | Stadium: St George Stadium; Attendance: 1,783; Referee: Richard Lorenc |

| 8 April 1979 5 | Marconi Fairfield | 2–1 | St George-Budapest | Sydney |
| | Degney 60'; Sharne 67' | Report | Katholos 48' | Stadium: Marconi Oval; Attendance: 4,356; Referee: Jim Reeves |

| 15 April 1979 6 | St George-Budapest | 0–2 | Adelaide City | Sydney |
| | | Report | Northcote 73'; Marocchi 76' | Stadium: St George Stadium; Attendance: 1,968; Referee: Henry Witschge |

| 22 April 1979 7 | St George-Budapest | 0–2 | Footscray JUST | Sydney |
| | | Report | Ollerton 20'; Ristovski 87' | Stadium: St George Stadium; Attendance: 1,867; Referee: Tony Boskovic |

| 29 April 1979 8 | South Melbourne | 2–0 | St George-Budapest | Melbourne |
| | Christopoulos 66'; Evans 79' | Report | | Stadium: Middle Park Soccer Stadium; Attendance: 4,500; Referee: Tony Beazleigh |

| 6 May 1979 9 | St George-Budapest | 2–0 | West Adelaide | Sydney |
| | J. O'Shea 19'; O'Connor 23' | Report | | Stadium: St George Stadium; Attendance: 1,815; Referee: Tim Davies |

| 13 May 1979 10 | Brisbane City | 4–0 | St George-Budapest | Brisbane |
| | Kelso 16'; Coyne 55'; Low 68', 69' | Report | | Stadium: Perry Park; Attendance: 2,200; Referee: Des Miles |

| 3 June 1979 11 | St George-Budapest | 1–2 | APIA Leichhardt | Sydney |
| | Matic 15' | Report | Butler 24', 41' | Stadium: St George Stadium; Attendance: 3,475; Referee: Jack Wood |

| 9 June 1979 12 | Newcastle KB United | 4–2 | St George-Budapest | Newcastle |
| 14:30 AEST | Drinkwater 2', 68' (pen.); Summerscales 32'; Cowburn 75' | Report | Cotton 43'; Hensman 89' | Stadium: Newcastle International Sports Centre; Attendance: 8,288; Referee: Jim Reeves |

| 17 June 1979 13 | St George-Budapest | 2–0 | Sydney Olympic | Sydney |
| | Cotton 13'; Morgan 75' | Report | | Stadium: St George Stadium; Attendance: 3,874; Referee: Richard Lorenc |

| 24 June 1979 14 | Canberra City | 1–1 | St George-Budapest | Canberra |
| | Byrne 34' | Report | Cotton 83' | Stadium: Bruce Stadium; Attendance: 3,220; Referee: Bob Mee |

| 8 July 1979 16 | Sydney City | 3–1 | St George-Budapest | Sydney |
| | Stevenson 42'; Souness 50'; Smith 62' | Report | O'Connor 21' | Stadium: Wentworth Park; Attendance: 1,741; Referee: Dave Nugent |

| 15 July 1979 17 | St George-Budapest | 1–1 | Brisbane Lions | Sydney |
| | Gnavi 87' | Report | Fairbrother 25' | Stadium: St George Stadium; Attendance: 1,876; Referee: Peter Rampley |

| 22 July 1979 18 | St George-Budapest | 1–1 | Marconi Fairfield | Sydney |
| | Russell 70' (o.g.) | Report | Mariani 88' | Stadium: St George Stadium; Attendance: 3,873; Referee: Bill Jones |

| 29 July 1979 19 | Adelaide City | 1–1 | St George-Budapest | Adelaide |
| | Kent 89' | Report | O'Connor 45' | Stadium: Olympic Sports Field; Attendance: 4,200; Referee: Bob Kerr |

| 5 August 1979 20 | Footscray JUST | 1–3 | St George-Budapest | Melbourne |
| | Lujic 42' | Report | Cotton 43', 53', 89' | Stadium: Olympic Park; Attendance: 1,000; Referee: Nick Karlich |

| 18 August 1979 21 | St George-Budapest | 1–0 | South Melbourne | Sydney |
| | Hensman 81' | Report | | Stadium: St George Stadium; Attendance: 2,143; Referee: Tim Davies |

| 26 August 1979 22 | West Adelaide | 0–1 | St George-Budapest | Adelaide |
| | | Report | Cotton 35' | Stadium: Hindmarsh Stadium; Attendance: 2,512; Referee: Don Campbell |

| 29 August 1979 15 | St George-Budapest | 2–2 | Heidelberg United | Sydney |
| | O'Connor 82', 85' | Report | Paton 35'; Campbell 60' | Stadium: St George Stadium; Attendance: 2,466; Referee: Tim Davies |

| 2 September 1979 23 | St George-Budapest | 0–1 | Brisbane City | Sydney |
| | | Report | Brusasco 2' | Stadium: St George Stadium; Attendance: 2,007; Referee: Peter Rampley |

| 9 September 1979 24 | APIA Leichhardt | 1–0 | St George-Budapest | Sydney |
| | Drewes 44' | Report | | Stadium: Wentworth Park; Attendance: 3,026; Referee: Tony Boskovic |

| 16 September 1979 25 | St George-Budapest | 1–1 | Newcastle KB United | Sydney |
| | Grosse 12' | Report | Boden 46' | Stadium: St George Stadium; Attendance: 3,017; Referee: Henry Witschge |

| 23 September 1979 26 | Sydney Olympic | 0–1 | St George-Budapest | Sydney |
| | | Report | Katholos 74' | Stadium: Marconi Oval; Attendance: 2,103; Referee: Stewart Mellings |

=== NSL Cup ===
Win Draw Loss

| 25 April 1979 First round | St George-Budapest | 6–2 | (Queensland) Ipswich United | Sydney |
| | Morgan (?); Katholos (?); J. O'Shea (?); O'Connor (?) | Report | R. Wilson (?); Kathage (?) | Stadium: St George Stadium; Attendance: 1,982; Referee: Richard Lorenc |

| 20 May 1979 Second round | St George-Budapest | 3–2 | APIA Leichhardt | Sydney |
| | J. O'Shea 53'; O'Connor 58'; Hensman 86' | Report | Reed 9'; Rampanti 61' | Stadium: St George Stadium; Attendance: 2,783; Referee: Bill Jones |

| 27 May 1979 Quarter-finals | Brisbane City | 1–1 (a.e.t.) (3–4 p) | St George-Budapest | Brisbane |
| | Ratcliffe 17' | Report | Hensman 11' | Stadium: Perry Park; Attendance: 2,500; Referee: Chris Bambridge |

| 12 August 1979 Semi-finals | Newcastle KB United | 0–0 (a.e.t.) (2–3 p) | St George-Budapest | Newcastle |
| | | Report | | Stadium: Newcastle International Sports Centre; Attendance: 15,177; Referee: Ken Allen |

| 30 September 1979 Final | Adelaide City | 3–2 | St George-Budapest | Adelaide |
| | J. Nyskohus 54', 76'; B. Nyskohus 65' | Report | O'Connor 21'; J. O'Shea 48' | Stadium: Olympic Sports Field; Attendance: 3,100; Referee: Stewart Mellings |

== Statistics ==
=== Appearances and goals ===
Includes all competitions. Players with no appearances not included in the list.

| No. | Pos. | Nat. | Player | National Soccer League | | NSL Cup | | Total | |
| No. | Pos. | Nat. | Player | Apps | Goals | Apps | Goals | Apps | Goals |
|---|---|---|---|---|---|---|---|---|---|
| 1 | GK | (Australia) | Martin Coe | 11 | 0 | 3 | 0 | 14 | 0 |
| 2 | DF | (Australia) | Doug Utjesenovic | 21 | 0 | 5 | 0 | 26 | 0 |
| 3 | DF | (Australia) | George Harris | 25 | 0 | 4 | 0 | 29 | 0 |
| 4 | DF | (Australia) | Peter Terry | 6 | 0 | 0 | 0 | 6 | 0 |
| 5 | DF | (Australia) | Robbie O'Shea | 26 | 0 | 5 | 0 | 31 | 0 |
| 6 | — | (Australia) | Brendan Grosse | 16+4 | 1 | 1 | 0 | 21 | 1 |
| 7 | FW | (England) | Peter Hensman | 13+7 | 2 | 2+2 | 2 | 24 | 4 |
| 8 | DF | (Australia) | John O'Shea | 26 | 3 | 5 | 3 | 31 | 6 |
| 9 | — | (Australia) | Stefan Matic | 9+2 | 1 | 1 | 0 | 12 | 1 |
| 10 | MF | (England) | Roy Cotton | 21+2 | 7 | 4 | 0 | 27 | 7 |
| 11 | FW | (Australia) | Phil O'Connor | 22 | 7 | 5 | 3 | 27 | 10 |
| 12 | GK | (Australia) | Mike Fraser | 15 | 0 | 2 | 0 | 17 | 0 |
| 14 | — | (England) | Nick Fenoughty | 6+4 | 0 | 1+1 | 0 | 12 | 0 |
| 15 | DF | (Argentina) | Rudi Della Picca | 16+2 | 0 | 4 | 0 | 22 | 0 |
| 16 | — | (Australia) | Tom Mihajlovic | 12+1 | 0 | 2 | 0 | 15 | 0 |
| 18 | — | (Australia) | Neville Morgan | 7+4 | 2 | 2+1 | 2 | 14 | 4 |
| 19 | MF | (Australia) | Mark Barton | 1+1 | 0 | 1 | 0 | 3 | 0 |
| 20 | MF | (Australia) | Rudolfo Gnavi | 20+1 | 1 | 3 | 0 | 24 | 1 |
| 21 | MF | (Australia) | Paul Kay | 1+5 | 0 | 0+2 | 0 | 8 | 0 |
| 22 | MF | (Australia) | Peter Katholos | 12+2 | 2 | 5 | 2 | 19 | 4 |
| 25 | — | (Australia) | Emery Holmik | 0+1 | 0 | 1 | 0 | 2 | 0 |
| — | DF | (Australia) | Nigel Groome | 0+1 | 0 | 0 | 0 | 1 | 0 |

=== Disciplinary record ===
Includes all competitions. The list is sorted by squad number when total cards are equal. Players with no cards not included in the list.

| Rank | No. | Pos. | Nat. | Player | National Soccer League | | | NSL Cup | | | Total | | |
| Rank | No. | Pos. | Nat. | Player | Yellow card | Second yellow card | Red card | Yellow card | Second yellow card | Red card | Yellow card | Second yellow card | Red card |
|---|---|---|---|---|---|---|---|---|---|---|---|---|---|
| 1 | 20 | MF | (Australia) | Rudolfo Gnavi | 6 | 0 | 0 | 1 | 0 | 0 | 7 | 0 | 0 |
| 2 | 3 | DF | (Australia) | George Harris | 4 | 0 | 0 | 1 | 0 | 0 | 5 | 0 | 0 |
| 3 | 7 | FW | (Australia) | Peter Hensman | 3 | 0 | 0 | 1 | 0 | 0 | 4 | 0 | 0 |
| 4 | 10 | MF | (England) | Roy Cotton | 1 | 0 | 0 | 1 | 0 | 0 | 2 | 0 | 0 |
| 4 | 15 | DF | (Australia) | Rudi Della Picca | 2 | 0 | 0 | 0 | 0 | 0 | 2 | 0 | 0 |
| 4 | 22 | MF | (Australia) | Peter Katholos | 2 | 0 | 0 | 0 | 0 | 0 | 2 | 0 | 0 |
| 7 | 2 | DF | (Australia) | Doug Utjesenovic | 1 | 0 | 0 | 0 | 0 | 0 | 1 | 0 | 0 |
| 7 | 5 | DF | (Australia) | Robbie O'Shea | 1 | 0 | 0 | 0 | 0 | 0 | 1 | 0 | 0 |
| 7 | 8 | DF | (Australia) | John O'Shea | 1 | 0 | 0 | 0 | 0 | 0 | 1 | 0 | 0 |
| 7 | 14 | — | (England) | Nick Fenoughty | 1 | 0 | 0 | 0 | 0 | 0 | 1 | 0 | 0 |
| 7 | 16 | — | (Australia) | Tom Mihajlovic | 1 | 0 | 0 | 0 | 0 | 0 | 1 | 0 | 0 |
| Total | | | | | 21 | 0 | 0 | 5 | 0 | 0 | 26 | 0 | 0 |

=== Clean sheets ===
Includes all competitions. The list is sorted by squad number when total clean sheets are equal. Numbers in parentheses represent games where both goalkeepers participated and both kept a clean sheet; the number in parentheses is awarded to the goalkeeper who was substituted on, whilst a full clean sheet is awarded to the goalkeeper who was on the field at the start of play. Goalkeepers with no clean sheets not included in the list.

| Rank | No. | Nat. | Goalkeeper | NSL | NSL Cup | Total |
|---|---|---|---|---|---|---|
| 1 | 12 | (Australia) | Mike Fraser | 4 | 1 | 5 |
| 2 | 1 | (Australia) | Martin Coe | 1 | 0 | 1 |
| Total | | | | 5 | 1 | 6 |
