= 1988 Wollongong City FC season =

Wollongong City
1988 season
- Manager: John Fleming
- Stadium: Brandon Park
- National Soccer League: 1st
- NSL Finals: Preliminary Final
- NSL Cup: First round
- Top goalscorer: League: Marshall Soper (6); All: Marshall Soper (6)
- Highest home attendance: 7,106 vs. Sydney Croatia (21 August 1988); National Soccer League
- Lowest home attendance: 1,284 vs. Brisbane Lions (10 April 1988)
- Average home league attendance: 2,753
- Biggest win: 6–1 vs. Brisbane Lions (H) (10 April 1988); National Soccer League
- Biggest defeat: 0–4 vs. Marconi Fairfield (H) (5 March 1988); National Soccer League

The 1988 season was the eighth in the history of Wollongong City (now Wollongong Wolves). It was the seventh season in the National Soccer League. In addition to the domestic league, they also participated in the NSL Cup. Wollongong City finished 1st in their National Soccer League season, and were eliminated in the NSL Cup first round by Brisbane Lions.

== Players ==
Note: Flags indicate national team as defined under FIFA eligibility rules; some limited exceptions apply. Players may hold more than one non-FIFA nationality.

No.	Pos.	Nation	Player
—	DF	ENG	Jeff Ainsworth
—		AUS	Jeff Allport
—	MF	AUS	Mineo Bonetig
—	FW	SCO	Alan Brazil
—	FW	AUS	Pat Brodnik
—		AUS	John Brown
—	MF	AUS	Brian Cokely
—	MF	AUS	Roy Cotton
—	MF	SCO	Danny Crainie
—	MF	AUS	Randall Easthorpe
—	FW	ENG	Trevor Francis
—	MF	AUS	Robert Giraldi

No.	Pos.	Nation	Player
—		AUS	Paul Keyes
—	DF	AUS	Jason Higgs
—	DF	ENG	Mike Hollifield
—	MF	AUS	Peter Kotamanidis
—	FW	ENG	Paul Mariner
—	FW	AUS	Jock Morlando
—	DF	AUS	David Ratcliffe
—	DF	AUS	David Skeen
—	FW	AUS	Marshall Soper
—	MF	AUS	Rade Stefanovski
—	DF	AUS	Ray Vliestra
—	GK	AUS	Warwick Young

== Competitions ==
=== Overview ===
Competition	First match	Last match	Starting round	Final position	Record							
Competition	First match	Last match	Starting round	Final position	Pld	W	D	L	GF	GA	GD	Win %
National Soccer League	31 January 1988	7 August 1988	Matchday 1	1st	26	13	8	5	44	32	+12	50.00
NSL Cup	23 January 1988		First round	First round	1	0	0	1	3	5	−2	0.00
Total					27	13	8	6	47	37	+10	48.15

Last updated: complete
Source: Competitions

=== National Soccer League ===
==== League table ====
Pos	Team	Pld	W	D	L	GF	GA	GD	Pts	Qualification or relegation
1	Wollongong City	26	13	8	5	44	32	+12	34	Qualification for the Finals series
2	Sydney Croatia	26	15	4	7	38	30	+8	34	Qualification for the Finals series
3	South Melbourne	26	13	8	5	36	29	+7	34	Qualification for the Finals series
4	Marconi Fairfield (C)	26	12	8	6	46	26	+20	32	Qualification for the Finals series
5	Sydney Olympic	26	9	9	8	28	22	+6	27	Qualification for the Finals series
6	Adelaide City	26	10	7	9	36	35	+1	27	
7	Sunshine George Cross	26	11	5	10	38	39	−1	27	
8	St George-Budapest	26	10	6	10	41	35	+6	26	
9	Melbourne Croatia	26	9	6	11	28	33	−5	24	
10	Footscray JUST	26	7	9	10	34	32	+2	23	
11	APIA Leichhardt	26	8	7	11	28	35	−7	23	
12	Preston Makedonia	26	5	12	9	29	35	−6	22	
13	Brunswick Juventus (R)	26	7	5	14	31	43	−12	19	Relegation to the Victorian State League
14	Brisbane Lions (R)	26	4	4	18	28	59	−31	12	Relegation to the Brisbane Premier League

Source: rsssf.com
Rules for classification: 1) points; 2) goal difference; 3) number of goals scored.
(C) Champions; (R) Relegated

==== Results by round ====
Round	1	2	3	4	5	6	7	8	9	10	11	12	13	14	15	16	17	18	19	20	21	22	23	24	25	26
Ground	H	H	A	H	A	H	A	A	A	H	A	H	A	H	A	H	A	H	A	H	H	H	A	H	A	A
Result	W	D	W	W	D	L	W	W	D	W	W	W	L	L	D	W	W	L	D	D	W	D	W	W	L	D
Position	4	2	1	1	1	3	2	1	1	1	1	1	1	2	2	2	1	1	2	2	1	3	1	1	2	1

Source: worldfootball.net
A = Away; H = Home; W = Win; D = Draw; L = Loss

==== Matches ====
31 January 1988 1	Wollongong City	3–1	St George-Budapest	Wollongong
	Brazil 28'; Easthorpe 58'; Stefanovski 84'	Report	Fletcher 90'	Stadium: Brandon Park; Attendance: 1,969; Referee: John McConnell

7 February 1988 2	Wollongong City	0–0	Preston Makedonia	Wollongong
		Report		Stadium: Brandon Park; Attendance: 2,140; Referee: Bob Marshall

15 February 1988 3	Adelaide City	2–3	Wollongong City	Adelaide
	Mullen 39'; Vidmar 51'	Report	Skeen 2'; Ainsworth 26'; Easthorpe 80'	Stadium: Olympic Sports Field; Attendance: 3,120; Referee: Mike Browning

21 February 1988 4	Wollongong City	4–1	Melbourne Croatia	Wollongong
	Giraldi 10'; Ainsworth ?' (pen.); Crainie ?'; Easthorpe 78'	Report	Biskic 57'	Stadium: Brandon Park; Attendance: 2,836; Referee: Arthur Owens

28 February 1988 5	Footscray JUST	0–0	Wollongong City	Melbourne
		Report		Stadium: Schintler Reserve; Attendance: 2,861; Referee: Jim Rossis

5 March 1988 6	Wollongong City	0–4	Marconi Fairfield	Wollongong
		Report	Lowe 39'; Gomez 75'; Nastevski 76'; Gray 79'	Stadium: Brandon Park; Attendance: 2,176; Referee: Rob Davies

20 March 1988 7	Sydney Olympic	0–1	Wollongong City	Sydney
		Report	Brazil 58'	Stadium: Sydney Football Stadium; Attendance: 4,616; Referee: Gary Power

27 March 1988 8	Sunshine George Cross	0–1	Wollongong City	Melbourne
		Report	Brodnik 72'	Stadium: Chaplin Reserve; Attendance: 2,200; Referee: Chris Bambridge

3 April 1988 9	APIA Leichhardt	1–1	Wollongong City	Sydney
	Bundalo 74'	Report	Brodnik 79'	Stadium: Wentworth Park; Attendance: 1,050; Referee: Richard Lorenc

10 April 1988 10	Wollongong City	6–1	Brisbane Lions	Wollongong
	Ratcliffe 6'; Soper 13', 58', 65', 76'; Crainie 88'	Report	Wheeler 85'	Stadium: Brandon Park; Attendance: 1,284; Referee: Terry Seacy

17 April 1988 11	Brunswick Juventus	1–2	Wollongong City	Melbourne
	Egan 31'	Report	Brazil 15'; Morlando 50'	Stadium: Olympic Park; Attendance: 850; Referee: John Fraser

24 April 1988 12	Wollongong City	4–0	South Melbourne	Wollongong
	Easthorpe 21', 51', 55'; Crainie 72'	Report		Stadium: Brandon Park; Attendance: 2,995; Referee: Gary Power

1 May 1988 13	St George-Budapest	2–1	Wollongong City	Sydney
	Moffitt 46'; Koczka 63'	Report	Hollifield 83'	Stadium: St George Stadium; Attendance: 1,548; Referee: John McConnell

8 May 1988 14	Wollongong City	0–3	Sydney Croatia	Melbourne
		Report	Lamond 6'; Arnold 14'; Slater 48'	Stadium: Olympic Park; Attendance: 4,755; Referee: Bob Marshall

15 May 1988 15	Preston Makedonia	1–1	Wollongong City	Melbourne
	Stewart 61'	Report	Brodnik 68'	Stadium: B.T. Connor Reserve; Attendance: 2,353; Referee: Bernie Upjohn

22 May 1988 16	Wollongong City	2–1	Adelaide City	Wollongong
	Francis 6'; Brazil 62'	Report	Melta 26' (pen.)	Stadium: Brandon Park; Attendance: 2,539; Referee: Richard Lorenc

29 May 1988 17	Melbourne Croatia	0–1	Wollongong City	Melbourne
		Report	Francis 89'	Stadium: Olympic Park; Attendance: 1,851; Referee: Chris Bambridge

5 June 1988 18	Wollongong City	1–4	Footscray JUST	Wollongong
	Brodnik 75'	Report	Bozinovski 4', 45'; Dimoski 9'; Spink 58'	Stadium: Brandon Park; Attendance: 2,795; Referee: Bill Monteverde

13 June 1988 19	Marconi Fairfield	1–1	Wollongong City	Sydney
	Farina 18'	Report	Morlando 55'	Stadium: Marconi Stadium; Attendance: 2,949; Referee: Roger Doneau

19 June 1988 20	Wollongong City	1–1	Sydney Olympic	Wollongong
	Brodnik 37'	Report	Polak 71'	Stadium: Brandon Park; Attendance: 2,230; Referee: Jim Reeves

26 June 1988 21	Wollongong City	3–1	Sunshine George Cross	Wollongong
	Easthorpe 21'; Cokely 67'; Crainie 80'	Report	Markovac 40'	Stadium: Brandon Park; Attendance: 1,432; Referee: Rob Davies

3 July 1988 22	Wollongong City	0–0	APIA Leichhardt	Wollongong
		Report		Stadium: Brandon Park; Attendance: 1,731; Referee: Don Campbell

16 July 1988 23	Brisbane Lions	2–3	Wollongong City	Brisbane
	Cole 34'; Lowey 81'	Report	Soper 44'; Ainsworth 61'; Easthorpe 87'	Stadium: Richlands Stadium; Attendance: 320; Referee: Arthur Owens

24 July 1988 24	Wollongong City	3–2	Brunswick Juventus	Wollongong
	Soper 6'; Kotamanidis 54'; Easthorpe 77'	Report	Egan 51'; Palatsides 82'	Stadium: Brandon Park; Attendance: 1,716; Referee: Richard Lorenc

31 July 1988 25	South Melbourne	2–1	Wollongong City	Melbourne
	Tasios 67'; Wade 70'	Report	Ainsworth 45'	Stadium: Middle Park; Attendance: 4,830; Referee: Don Campbell

7 August 1988 26	Sydney Croatia	1–1	Wollongong City	Sydney
	Jones 90+2'	Report	Ratcliffe 79'	Stadium: Croatian Sports Centre; Attendance: 6,702; Referee: Richard Lorenc

==== Finals series ====
21 August 1988 Major semi-final	Wollongong City	0–0 (3–4 p)	Sydney Croatia	Sydney
		Report		Stadium: Marconi Stadium; Attendance: 7,106; Referee: Rob Davies

28 August 1988 Preliminary Final	Wollongong City	0–2	Marconi Fairfield	Sydney
		Report	Lowe 55'; Farina 57'	Stadium: Croatian Sports Centre; Attendance: 3,592; Referee: Gary Power

=== NSL Cup ===
23 January 1988 First round	Brisbane Lions	5–3	Wollongong City	Brisbane
	Lightbrown 17', 90+3'; Cummings 22'; Stewart ?'; Druery ?'	Report		Stadium: Richlands Stadium; Attendance: 2,855; Referee: Alan Kibbler

== Statistics ==
=== Appearances and goals ===
Players with no appearances not included in the list.

No.	Pos.	Nat.	Name	National Soccer League		NSL Cup		Total	
No.	Pos.	Nat.	Name	Apps	Goals	Apps	Goals	Apps	Goals
	DF	(England)	Jeff Ainsworth	22(1)	4	0	0	23	4
		(Australia)	Jeff Allport	0(1)	0	0	0	1	0
	MF	(Australia)	Mineo Bonetig	1(1)	0	0	0	2	0
	FW	(Scotland)	Alan Brazil	12	4	1	1	13	5
	FW	(Australia)	Pat Brodnik	22(2)	5	0	0	24	5
	FW	(Australia)	John Brown	0	0	0(1)	0	1	0
	MF	(Australia)	Brian Cokely	15(4)	1	1	1	20	2
	MF	(Australia)	Roy Cotton	1(2)	0	0	0	3	0
	FW	(Scotland)	Danny Crainie	28	4	1	1	29	5
	MF	(Australia)	Randall Easthorpe	21(3)	0	1	0	25	0
	FW	(England)	Trevor Francis	3	2	0	0	3	2
	MF	(Australia)	Robert Giraldi	3(1)	1	0	0	4	1
		(Australia)	Paul Keyes	2	0	0	0	2	0
	DF	(Australia)	Jason Higgs	0(1)	0	0	0	1	0
	DF	(England)	Mike Hollifield	21(1)	1	0	0	22	1
	MF	(Australia)	Peter Kotamanidis	12(8)	1	1	0	21	1
	FW	(England)	Paul Mariner	2	0	0	0	2	0
	FW	(Australia)	Jock Morlando	21	2	1	0	22	2
	DF	(Australia)	David Ratcliffe	27	2	1	0	28	2
	DF	(Australia)	David Skeen	26	1	1	0	27	1
	FW	(Australia)	Marshall Soper	6(3)	6	0	0	9	6
		(Australia)	Rade Stefanovski	8(4)	1	1	0	13	1
	DF	(Australia)	Ray Vliestra	27	0	1	0	28	0
	GK	(Australia)	Warwick Young	28	0	1	0	29	0

=== Clean sheets ===
Rank	No.	Pos	Nat	Name	National Soccer League	NSL Cup	Total
1	—	GK	(Australia)	Warwick Young	8	0	8
Total					8	0	8
