= 1980 St George-Budapest FC season =

St George-Budapest
1980 season
- Head Coach: Raul Blanco
- Stadium: St George Stadium; Sydney Cricket Ground
- National Soccer League: 14th
- NSL Cup: Quarter-finals
- Top goalscorer: League: Dennis Duarte (11); All: Dennis Duarte (13)
- Highest home attendance: 6,000 vs. South Melbourne (18 May 1980); National Soccer League
- Lowest home attendance: 720 vs. Inter Monaro (25 April 1980); NSL Cup
- Average home league attendance: 2,880
- Biggest win: 4–1 vs. Inter Monaro (H) (25 April 1980); NSL Cup; 4–1 vs. Blacktown City (H) (15 June 1980); National Soccer League; 3–0 vs. Blacktown City (A) (6 July 1980); NSL Cup
- Biggest defeat: 1–6 vs. Adelaide City (A) (27 July 1980); National Soccer League

The 1980 season was the fourth in the National Soccer League for St George-Budapest (now St George Football Club). In addition to the domestic league, they also participated in the NSL Cup. St George-Budapest finished 14th to be relegated in their National Soccer League season, and were eliminated in the quarter-finals of the NSL Cup.

== Players ==
Note: Flags indicate national team as defined under FIFA eligibility rules; some limited exceptions apply. Players may hold more than one non-FIFA nationality.

| No. | Pos. | Nation | Player |
|---|---|---|---|
| 1 | GK | AUS | Mike Fraser |
| 2 | DF | AUS | Nigel Groome |
| 3 | DF | AUS | Peter Terry |
| 4 | DF | AUS | David Skeen |
| 5 | DF | AUS | Doug Utjesenovic (captain) |
| 6 | MF | AUS | Rudolfo Gnavi |
| 7 | MF | AUS | Paul Kay |
| 8 | MF | AUS | Peter Stone |
| 9 | FW | AUS | Peter Beggs |
| 10 | MF | AUS | Peter Katholos |
| 11 | MF | ENG | Roy Cotton |
| 12 | GK | AUS | Don Smith |
| 13 | MF | AUS | Mark Barton |
| 14 | MF | AUS | Billy Griffith |

| No. | Pos. | Nation | Player |
|---|---|---|---|
| 15 | DF | AUS | Dave McIntosh |
| 16 | MF | AUS | Aaron Scharfegger |
| 17 | FW | AUS | Ernie Campbell |
| 18 | FW | AUS | Dennis Duarte |
| 19 | | AUS | Howard Hadley |
| 20 | MF | AUS | John Russell |
| — | | AUS | Billy Buloch |
| — | MF | AUS | John Davies |
| — | | ENG | Nick Fenoughty |
| — | | AUS | Ron Fraser |
| — | | AUS | Tom Mihajlovic |
| — | DF | AUS | Steve Ververis |
| — | DF | AUS | Richard Yamine |

== Competitions ==
=== Overall record ===
| Competition | First match | Last match | Starting round | Final position | Record | | | | | | | |
| Competition | First match | Last match | Starting round | Final position | Pld | W | D | L | GF | GA | GD | Win % |
|---|---|---|---|---|---|---|---|---|---|---|---|---|
| National Soccer League | 9 March 1980 | 28 September 1980 | Matchday 1 | 14th | 26 | 5 | 4 | 17 | 32 | 65 | −33 | 19.23 |
| NSL Cup | 25 April 1980 | 3 August 1980 | First round | Quarter-finals | 3 | 2 | 0 | 1 | 7 | 5 | +2 | 66.67 |
| Total | | | | | 29 | 7 | 4 | 18 | 39 | 70 | −31 | 24.14 |

Source: Competitions

=== National Soccer League ===
==== League table ====
| Pos | Team | Pld | W | D | L | GF | GA | GD | Pts | Qualification or relegation |
|---|---|---|---|---|---|---|---|---|---|---|
| 1 | Sydney City (C) | 26 | 16 | 5 | 5 | 51 | 26 | +25 | 37 | Qualification to Finals series (Note: The Finals series was not considered the championship for the 1980 National Soccer League.) |
| 2 | Heidelberg United | 26 | 15 | 6 | 5 | 55 | 33 | +22 | 36 | Qualification to Finals series |
| 3 | South Melbourne | 26 | 15 | 5 | 6 | 42 | 21 | +21 | 35 | Qualification to Finals series |
| 4 | Marconi Fairfield | 26 | 14 | 6 | 6 | 53 | 32 | +21 | 34 | Qualification to Finals series |
| 5 | Adelaide City | 26 | 13 | 4 | 9 | 40 | 27 | +13 | 30 | |
| 6 | Newcastle KB United | 26 | 12 | 6 | 8 | 32 | 31 | +1 | 30 | |
| 7 | Brisbane Lions | 26 | 7 | 11 | 8 | 28 | 32 | −4 | 25 | |
| 8 | APIA Leichhardt | 26 | 8 | 7 | 11 | 27 | 35 | −8 | 23 | |
| 9 | Footscray JUST | 26 | 7 | 9 | 10 | 32 | 41 | −9 | 23 | |
| 10 | Canberra City | 26 | 7 | 7 | 12 | 34 | 33 | +1 | 21 | |
| 11 | Blacktown City | 26 | 9 | 3 | 14 | 34 | 55 | −21 | 21 | |
| 12 | Brisbane City | 26 | 4 | 10 | 12 | 29 | 36 | −7 | 18 | |
| 13 | West Adelaide | 26 | 7 | 3 | 16 | 24 | 46 | −22 | 17 | |
| 14 | St George-Budapest (R) | 26 | 5 | 4 | 17 | 32 | 65 | −33 | 14 | Relegated to the 1981 NSW State League |

Updated to match(es) played on unknown. Source: rsssf.com
Rules for classification: 1) points; 2) goal difference; 3) number of goals scored.
(C) Champions; (R) Relegated

==== Results summary ====
| Overall | | | | | | | | Home | | | | | | Away | | | | | |
| Pld | W | D | L | GF | GA | GD | Pts | W | D | L | GF | GA | GD | W | D | L | GF | GA | GD |
|---|---|---|---|---|---|---|---|---|---|---|---|---|---|---|---|---|---|---|---|
| 26 | 5 | 4 | 17 | 32 | 65 | −33 | 19 | 3 | 2 | 8 | 17 | 32 | −15 | 2 | 2 | 9 | 15 | 33 | −18 |

Source: worldfootball.net

==== Results by round ====
| Round | 1 | 2 | 3 | 4 | 5 | 6 | 7 | 8 | 9 | 10 | 11 | 12 | 14 | 15 | 16 | 13 | 17 | 18 | 19 | 20 | 21 | 22 | 23 | 24 | 25 | 26 |
|---|---|---|---|---|---|---|---|---|---|---|---|---|---|---|---|---|---|---|---|---|---|---|---|---|---|---|
| Ground | A | H | A | H | A | H | H | A | H | A | H | A | A | H | A | H | H | H | A | A | H | A | H | A | H | A |
| Result | L | W | W | L | L | L | L | D | L | L | L | L | W | W | L | L | D | D | L | D | L | L | L | L | W | L |
| Position | 13 | 8 | 3 | 7 | 10 | 11 | 12 | 12 | 12 | 13 | 14 | 14 | 14 | 13 | 14 | 14 | 14 | 14 | 14 | 14 | 14 | 14 | 14 | 14 | 14 | 14 |
| Points | 0 | 2 | 4 | 4 | 4 | 4 | 4 | 5 | 5 | 5 | 5 | 5 | 7 | 9 | 9 | 9 | 10 | 11 | 11 | 12 | 12 | 12 | 12 | 12 | 14 | 14 |

Source: worldfootball.net
A = Away; H = Home; W = Win; D = Draw; L = Loss

==== Matches ====
Win Draw Loss

| 9 March 1980 1 | Blacktown City | 4–2 | St George-Budapest | Sydney |
| 15:00 AEDT | Charlton 6'; Fisher 41'; Wilkinson 42'; Harding 75' | Report | Beggs 29'; McIntosh 50' | Stadium: Gabbie Stadium; Attendance: 3,478; Referee: Henry Witschge |

| 16 March 1980 2 | St George-Budapest | 1–0 | APIA Leichhardt | Sydney |
| | Kay 5' | Report | | Stadium: St George Stadium; Attendance: 3,864; Referee: Tony Boskovic |

| 23 March 1980 3 | Brisbane City | 0–1 | St George-Budapest | Brisbane |
| | | Report | Beggs 11' | Stadium: Perry Park; Attendance: 2,050; Referee: Bob Mee |

| 30 March 1980 4 | St George-Budapest | 1–5 | Canberra City | Sydney |
| 15:00 AEDT | Duarte 65' | Report | Utjesenovic 15' (o.g.); Valeri 35', 86'; Cole 50'; Maclaren 89' | Stadium: St George Stadium; Attendance: 3,033; Referee: Richard Lorenc |

| 6 April 1980 5 | Footscray JUST | 5–3 | St George-Budapest | Melbourne |
| | Jovanovic 15'; Lujic 26'; Kondarios 50'; Vasic 76'; Ollerton 86' | Report | Kay 47'; Duarte 64', 78' | Stadium: Western Oval; Attendance: 3,540; Referee: Evan Venios |

| 13 April 1980 6 | St George-Budapest | 1–4 | Adelaide City | Sydney |
| | Cotton 38' (pen.) | Report | J. Nyskohus 13', 46', 87' (pen.); Dods 43' | Stadium: St George Stadium; Attendance: 3,264; Referee: Des Miles |

| 20 April 1980 7 | St George-Budapest | 2–3 | Brisbane Lions | Sydney |
| | Duarte 24'; Cotton 89' | Report | Lindsay 58'; Ontong 70'; McGregor 79' | Stadium: St George Stadium; Attendance: 2,094; Referee: R. Warren |

| 27 April 1980 8 | Marconi Fairfield | 0–0 | St George-Budapest | Sydney |
| 15:00 AEST | | Report | | Stadium: Marconi Oval; Attendance: 4,624; Referee: Jim Reeves |

| 4 May 1980 9 | St George-Budapest | 0–3 | Newcastle KB United | Sydney |
| | | Report | Cowburn 17'; Heys 20'; P. Tredinnick 60' | Stadium: St George Stadium; Attendance: 2,429; Referee: Henry Witschge |

| 11 May 1980 10 | Heidelberg United | 4–2 | St George-Budapest | Melbourne |
| | Campbell 24'; Cole 62', 72'; Bozikas 71' | Report | Duarte 15', 84' | Stadium: Olympic Park; Attendance: 3,200; Referee: Chris Bambridge |

| 18 May 1980 11 | St George-Budapest | 0–3 | South Melbourne | Sydney |
| | | Report | Xanthopoulos 35'; Cummings 64'; Evans 74' | Stadium: Sydney Cricket Ground; Attendance: 6,000; Referee: Richard Lorenc |

| 25 May 1980 12 | West Adelaide | 1–0 | St George-Budapest | Adelaide |
| | Kosmina 41' | Report | | Stadium: Hindmarsh Stadium; Attendance: 3,100; Referee: Graham Neal |

| 8 June 1980 14 | APIA Leichhardt | 1–2 | St George-Budapest | Sydney |
| | O'Connor 56' | Report | Campbell 22'; Duarte 76' | Stadium: Lambert Park; Attendance: 2,812; Referee: Chris Bambridge |

| 15 June 1980 15 | St George-Budapest | 4–1 | Blacktown City | Sydney |
| 15:00 AEDT | Campbell 14'; Griffith 16'; Duarte 75'; Stone 87' | Report | Pointer 28' | Stadium: St George Stadium; Attendance: 3,269; Referee: Tony Boskovic |

| 22 June 1980 16 | Canberra City | 4–1 | St George-Budapest | Canberra |
| | Brennan 36'; Byrne 72', 82'; Giampaolo 86' | Report | Utjesenovic 45' (pen.) | Stadium: Bruce Stadium; Attendance: 3,450; Referee: Col Amos |

| 29 June 1980 13 | St George-Budapest | 0–2 | Sydney City | Sydney |
| | | Report | Watson 70'; Stevenson 84' | Stadium: St George Stadium; Attendance: 2,118; Referee: Doug Rennie |

| 13 July 1980 17 | St George-Budapest | 1–1 | Brisbane City | Sydney |
| 15:00 AEST | Katholos 79' | Report | Ratcliffe 22' | Stadium: St George Stadium; Attendance: 2,107; Referee: Richard Lorenc |

| 20 July 1980 18 | St George-Budapest | 1–1 | Footscray JUST | Sydney |
| | Katholos 48' (pen.) | Report | Vasic 66' | Stadium: St George Stadium; Attendance: 2,174; Referee: Jim Reeves |

| 27 July 1980 19 | Adelaide City | 6–1 | St George-Budapest | Adelaide |
| | Mitchell 25', 64'; Jones 36'; Melta 45'; J. Nyskohus 54' (pen.), 70' (pen.) | Report | Campbell 34' | Stadium: Olympic Sports Field; Attendance: 2,400; Referee: Don Campbell |

| 10 August 1980 20 | Brisbane Lions | 0–0 | St George-Budapest | Brisbane |
| | | Report | | Stadium: Lions Stadium; Attendance: 2,400; Referee: Dave Nugent |

| 17 August 1980 21 | St George-Budapest | 0–3 | Marconi Fairfield | Sydney |
| | | Report | Krncevic 9'; Jankovics 49'; Vieri 72' (pen.) | Stadium: St George Stadium; Attendance: 3,217; Referee: Doug Rennie |

| 23 August 1980 22 | Newcastle KB United | 2–1 | St George-Budapest | Newcastle |
| | Jones 56'; Senkalski 74' | Report | Stone 70' | Stadium: Newcastle International Sports Centre; Attendance: 7,268; Referee: Jim Reeves |

| 7 September 1980 23 | St George-Budapest | 3–5 | Heidelberg United | Sydney |
| 15:00 AEST | Cotton 26' (pen.); Katholos 45'; Barton 79' | Report | Yzendoorn 7', 48'; Paton 52', 65'; Cole 71' | Stadium: St George Stadium; Attendance: 2,231; Referee: Henry Witschge |

| 14 September 1980 24 | South Melbourne | 2–1 | St George-Budapest | Melbourne |
| | Kakantonis 17'; Wright 35' | Report | Cotton 78' | Stadium: Middle Park Soccer Stadium; Attendance: 1,600; Referee: Bobby Kerr |

| 21 September 1980 25 | St George-Budapest | 3–1 | West Adelaide | Sydney |
| | Duarte 65', 77', 82' | Report | Manecas 83' | Stadium: St George Stadium; Attendance: 1,638; Referee: Jack Johnston |

| 28 September 1980 26 | Sydney City | 4–1 | St George-Budapest | Sydney |
| | Boden 38', 48'; Trenter 60', 86' | Report | Griffith 52' | Stadium: ES Marks Athletics Field; Attendance: 3,540; Referee: Tim Davies |

=== NSL Cup ===
Win Draw Loss

| 25 April 1980 First round | St George-Budapest | 4–1 | (Australian Capital Territory) Inter Monaro | Sydney |
| | Beggs 30', 47' (pen.); Duarte 62'; Santolin 28' (o.g.) | Report | | Stadium: St George Stadium; Attendance: 720; Referee: Tim Davies |

| 6 July 1980 Second round | Blacktown City | 0–3 | St George-Budapest | Sydney |
| | | Report | Katholos 41'; Beggs 46'; Duarte 85' | Stadium: Gabbie Stadium; Attendance: 3,000; Referee: Dave Nugent |

| 3 August 1980 Quarter-finals | Marconi Fairfield | 4–0 | St George-Budapest | Sydney |
| | Krncevic 28', 82'; Byrne 34' (pen.); Jankovics 47' | Report | | Stadium: Marconi Oval; Attendance: 3,652; Referee: Henry Witschge |

== Statistics ==
=== Appearances and goals ===
Includes all competitions. Players with no appearances not included in the list.

| No. | Pos. | Nat. | Player | National Soccer League | | NSL Cup | | Total | |
| No. | Pos. | Nat. | Player | Apps | Goals | Apps | Goals | Apps | Goals |
|---|---|---|---|---|---|---|---|---|---|
| 1 | GK | (Australia) | Mike Fraser | 18 | 0 | 0 | 0 | 18 | 0 |
| 2 | DF | (Australia) | Nigel Groome | 7 | 0 | 0 | 0 | 7 | 0 |
| 3 | DF | (Australia) | Peter Terry | 17 | 0 | 2 | 0 | 19 | 0 |
| 4 | DF | (Australia) | David Skeen | 9 | 0 | 2 | 0 | 11 | 0 |
| 5 | DF | (Australia) | Doug Utjesenovic | 20 | 1 | 1 | 0 | 21 | 1 |
| 6 | MF | (Australia) | Rudolfo Gnavi | 8+1 | 0 | 1 | 0 | 10 | 0 |
| 7 | MF | (Australia) | Paul Kay | 12+5 | 2 | 1+1 | 0 | 19 | 2 |
| 8 | MF | (Australia) | Peter Stone | 16 | 2 | 0 | 0 | 16 | 2 |
| 9 | FW | (Australia) | Peter Beggs | 11+4 | 2 | 2+1 | 3 | 18 | 5 |
| 10 | MF | (Australia) | Peter Katholos | 18+3 | 3 | 3 | 1 | 24 | 4 |
| 11 | MF | (England) | Roy Cotton | 11+6 | 4 | 2 | 0 | 19 | 4 |
| 12 | GK | (Australia) | Don Smith | 8 | 0 | 1 | 0 | 9 | 0 |
| 13 | MF | (Australia) | Mark Barton | 9+3 | 1 | 1+1 | 0 | 14 | 1 |
| 14 | MF | (Australia) | Billy Griffith | 22 | 2 | 2 | 0 | 24 | 2 |
| 15 | DF | (Australia) | Dave McIntosh | 25 | 1 | 2 | 0 | 27 | 1 |
| 16 | MF | (Australia) | Aaron Scharfegger | 2 | 0 | 1 | 0 | 3 | 0 |
| 17 | FW | (Australia) | Ernie Campbell | 14 | 3 | 2 | 0 | 16 | 3 |
| 18 | FW | (Australia) | Dennis Duarte | 20+1 | 11 | 3 | 2 | 24 | 13 |
| 19 | — | (Australia) | Howard Hadley | 9+4 | 0 | 3 | 0 | 16 | 0 |
| 20 | MF | (Australia) | John Russell | 14 | 0 | 0 | 0 | 14 | 0 |
| — | — | (Australia) | Billy Buloch | 0+1 | 0 | 0+1 | 0 | 2 | 0 |
| — | MF | (Australia) | John Davies | 8 | 0 | 0 | 0 | 8 | 0 |
| — | — | (England) | Nick Fenoughty | 0+2 | 0 | 0 | 0 | 2 | 0 |
| — | — | (Australia) | Ron Fraser | 0+1 | 0 | 3 | 0 | 4 | 0 |
| — | — | (Australia) | Tom Mihajlovic | 4+1 | 0 | 0 | 0 | 5 | 0 |
| — | DF | (Australia) | Steve Ververis | 2 | 0 | 0 | 0 | 2 | 0 |
| — | DF | (Australia) | Richard Yamine | 2+1 | 0 | 1 | 0 | 4 | 0 |

=== Disciplinary record ===
Includes all competitions. The list is sorted by squad number when total cards are equal. Players with no cards not included in the list.

| Rank | No. | Pos. | Nat. | Player | National Soccer League | | | NSL Cup | | | Total | | |
| Rank | No. | Pos. | Nat. | Player | Yellow card | Second yellow card | Red card | Yellow card | Second yellow card | Red card | Yellow card | Second yellow card | Red card |
|---|---|---|---|---|---|---|---|---|---|---|---|---|---|
| 1 | 17 | FW | (Australia) | Ernie Campbell | 3 | 0 | 1 | 2 | 0 | 0 | 5 | 0 | 1 |
| 2 | 11 | MF | (England) | Roy Cotton | 2 | 0 | 1 | 0 | 0 | 0 | 2 | 0 | 1 |
| 3 | 15 | DF | (Australia) | Dave McIntosh | 6 | 0 | 0 | 0 | 0 | 0 | 6 | 0 | 0 |
| 4 | 6 | MF | (Australia) | Rudolfo Gnavi | 5 | 0 | 0 | 0 | 0 | 0 | 5 | 0 | 0 |
| 5 | 9 | FW | (Australia) | Peter Beggs | 3 | 0 | 0 | 1 | 0 | 0 | 4 | 0 | 0 |
| 6 | 4 | DF | (Australia) | David Skeen | 1 | 0 | 0 | 1 | 0 | 0 | 2 | 0 | 0 |
| 6 | 7 | MF | (Australia) | Paul Kay | 2 | 0 | 0 | 0 | 0 | 0 | 2 | 0 | 0 |
| 6 | 16 | MF | (Australia) | Aaron Scharfegger | 1 | 0 | 0 | 1 | 0 | 0 | 2 | 0 | 0 |
| 6 | 19 | — | (Australia) | Howard Hadley | 2 | 0 | 0 | 0 | 0 | 0 | 2 | 0 | 0 |
| 10 | 3 | DF | (Australia) | Peter Terry | 1 | 0 | 0 | 0 | 0 | 0 | 1 | 0 | 0 |
| 10 | 5 | DF | (Australia) | Doug Utjesenovic | 1 | 0 | 0 | 0 | 0 | 0 | 1 | 0 | 0 |
| 10 | 8 | MF | (Australia) | Peter Stone | 1 | 0 | 0 | 0 | 0 | 0 | 1 | 0 | 0 |
| 10 | 10 | MF | (Australia) | Peter Katholos | 1 | 0 | 0 | 0 | 0 | 0 | 1 | 0 | 0 |
| 10 | 13 | MF | (Australia) | Mark Barton | 1 | 0 | 0 | 0 | 0 | 0 | 1 | 0 | 0 |
| 10 | — | DF | (Australia) | Richard Yamine | 1 | 0 | 0 | 0 | 0 | 0 | 1 | 0 | 0 |
| Total | | | | | 30 | 0 | 2 | 6 | 0 | 0 | 36 | 0 | 2 |

=== Clean sheets ===
Includes all competitions. The list is sorted by squad number when total clean sheets are equal. Numbers in parentheses represent games where both goalkeepers participated and both kept a clean sheet; the number in parentheses is awarded to the goalkeeper who was substituted on, whilst a full clean sheet is awarded to the goalkeeper who was on the field at the start of play. Goalkeepers with no clean sheets not included in the list.

| Rank | No. | Nat. | Goalkeeper | NSL | NSL Cup | Total |
|---|---|---|---|---|---|---|
| 1 | 12 | (Australia) | Don Smith | 3 | 0 | 3 |
| 1 | 1 | (Australia) | Mike Fraser | 1 | 1 | 2 |
| Total | | | | 4 | 1 | 5 |
