= 1988 NSL Cup =

National Soccer League Cup

Tournament details
- Country: Australia
- Dates: 23 January – 14 August 1988
- Teams: 14

Final positions
- Champions: APIA Leichhardt (2nd title)
- Runners-up: Brunswick Juventus

Tournament statistics
- Matches played: 13
- Goals scored: 38 (2.92 per match)
- Attendance: 36,758 (2,828 per match)

The 1988 NSL Cup was the twelfth edition of the NSL Cup, which was the main national association football knockout cup competition in Australia. The NSL Cup was sponsored by Beach Fashions and known as the Beach Fashions Cup for sponsorship purposes.

Sydney Croatia were the defending champions, having defeated South Melbourne to win their first title in the previous year's final, but they were eliminated in the semi-finals by eventual winners APIA Leichhardt.

APIA Leichhardt defeated Brunswick Juventus 5–3 on penalties after a 0–0 draw in the final to win their second NSL Cup title.

== Teams ==
The NSL Cup was a knockout competition with 14 teams taking part all trying to reach the Final in August 1988. The competition consisted of the 14 teams from the National Soccer League.

Round	Main date	Number of fixtures	Clubs remaining
First round	Saturday 23 January 1988	6	14 → 8
Second round	Wednesday 17 February 1988	4	8 → 4
Semi-finals	Wednesday 6 April 1988	2	4 → 2
Final	Sunday 14 August 1988	1	2 → 1

== First round ==
South Melbourne and Sydney Croatia had a bye for the First round.

23 January 1988	Brisbane Lions	5–3	Wollongong City	Brisbane
18:00 AEST	Lightbrown 17', 90+3'; Cummings 22'; Stewart ?'; Druery ?'	Report	Brazil 7' (pen.); Crainie 34'; Cokely 40'	Stadium: Richlands Stadium; Attendance: 2,855; Referee: Alan Kibbler

23 January 1988	Footscray JUST	3–2	Preston Makedonia	Melbourne
18:00 AEDT	Crino 25', 42'; Bozinoski 71'	Report	Branov 58'; Smith 64'	Stadium: Olympic Park; Attendance: 3,000; Referee: John Fraser

23 January 1988	Adelaide City	2–0	Sunshine George Cross	Adelaide
19:00 ACDT	Maxwell 29'; Sorensen 59'	Report		Stadium: Hindmarsh Stadium; Attendance: 1,287; Referee: Jim Rossis

23 January 1988	Brunswick Juventus	1–0	Melbourne Knights	Melbourne
20:00 AEDT	Lewis 80'	Report		Stadium: Olympic Park; Attendance: 3,000; Referee: Jim Fearn

23 January 1988	Marconi Fairfield	1–2	APIA Leichhardt	Sydney
20:00 AEDT	De Jong 80'	Report	Butler 3'; Parison 20'	Stadium: Marconi Stadium; Attendance: 2,120; Referee: Richard Lorenc

24 January 1988	St George-Budapest	1–2 (a.e.t.)	Sydney Olympic	Sydney
19:00 AEDT	Pottier 13'	Report	Kosmina 74'; Soper 107'	Stadium: St George Stadium; Attendance: 3,070; Referee: Terry Seacy

== Second round ==
17 February 1988	APIA Leichhardt	0–0 (a.e.t.) (4–2 p)	Sydney Olympic	Sydney
18:30 AEDT		Report		Stadium: Parramatta Stadium; Attendance: 3,994; Referee: Chris Bambridge
	Penalties
	Bertogna (penalty missed); Brown (penalty scored); Yankos (penalty scored); Watson (penalty scored); de Marigny (penalty scored)		(penalty scored) Kosmina; (penalty scored) Lee; (penalty missed) Polack; (penalty missed) Phillips

17 February 1988	Brunswick Juventus	1–1 (a.e.t.) (7–6 p)	Footscray JUST	Melbourne
19:30 AEDT	Palatsides 107'	Report	Bozinoski 119'	Stadium: Olympic Park; Attendance: 1,300; Referee: Jim Rossis
	Penalties
	Egan (penalty scored); Marley (penalty scored); Incantalupo (penalty scored); Lane (penalty scored); Palatsides (penalty scored); Patterson (penalty scored); Belic (penalty scored)		(penalty scored) Bozinoski; (penalty scored) Fabrizio; (penalty scored) Dimoski; (penalty scored) van Egmond; (penalty scored) Karic; (penalty scored) Spink

17 February 1988	Sydney Croatia	3–0	Brisbane Lions	Sydney
20:15 AEDT	Slater 46'; Hunter ?' (pen.); Lamond ?'	Report		Stadium: Parramatta Stadium; Attendance: 3,994; Referee: Rob Davies

2 March 1988	South Melbourne	5–2	Adelaide City	Melbourne
19:30 AEDT	Trimboli 39'; Wright 46', 74'; Tsolakis 54'; Postecoglou 70' (pen.)	Report	Villani 21'; Melta 90+1'	Stadium: Olympic Park; Attendance: 1,921; Referee: Chris Bambridge

== Semi-finals ==
6 April 1988	APIA Leichhardt	2–1 (a.e.t.)	Sydney Croatia	Sydney
19:30 AEST	Phillips 64'; Ward 91'	Report	Slater 20'	Stadium: Marconi Stadium; Attendance: 3,866; Referee: Don Campbell

6 April 1988	Brunswick Juventus	1–0	South Melbourne	Melbourne
19:30 AEST	Petersen 65'	Report		Stadium: Olympic Park; Attendance: 4,151; Referee: Gary Power

== Final ==
14 August 1988
14:30 AEST

APIA Leichhardt	0–0 (a.e.t.)	Brunswick Juventus
	Report
Penalties
Bertogna (penalty scored); McKinna (penalty scored); Yankos (penalty scored); Watson (penalty scored); de Marigny (penalty scored)	5–3	(penalty missed) Yzendoorn; (penalty scored) Egan; (penalty scored) Palatsides; (penalty scored) Marley

Marconi Stadium, Sydney
Attendance: 2,200
Referee: Alan Kibbler
