= 1988 NSL Cup final =

- Event: 1988 NSL Cup
APIA Leichhardt	Brunswick Juventus
0	0
- After extra time APIA Leichhardt won 5–3 on penalties
- Date: 14 August 1988
- Venue: Marconi Stadium, Sydney
- Referee: Alan Kibbler
- Attendance: 2,200

The 1988 NSL Cup final was the final match of the 1988 NSL Cup, the twelfth season of the National Soccer League Cup. It was played at Marconi Stadium in Sydney on 14 August 1988 between APIA Leichhardt and Brunswick Juventus. APIA Leichhardt won the match 5–3 on penalties after extra time for their second NSL Cup title.

== Route to the final ==
Sydney Olympic		Round	Preston Makedonia	
Opposition	Score	Round	Opposition	Score
Marconi Fairfield (A)	2–1	R1	Melbourne Knights (H)	1–0
Sydney Olympic (H)	0–0 (a.e.t.) (4–2 p)	R2	Footscray JUST (H)	1–1 (a.e.t.) (7–6 p)
Sydney Croatia (H)	2–1 (a.e.t.)	SF	South Melbourne (H)	1–0
Key: (H) = Home venue; (A) = Away venue

== Match ==
=== Details ===
14 August 1988
14:30 AEST

APIA Leichhardt	0–0 (a.e.t.)	Brunswick Juventus
	Report
Penalties
Bertogna (penalty scored); McKinna (penalty scored); Yankos (penalty scored); Watson (penalty scored); de Marigny (penalty scored)	5–3	(penalty missed) Yzendoorn; (penalty scored) Egan; (penalty scored) Palatsides; (penalty scored) Marley

Marconi Stadium, Sydney
Attendance: 2,200
Referee: Alan Kibbler

GK	(Australia) Tony Pezzano
DF	(Australia) Jean-Paul de Marigny
DF	(Australia) Charlie Yankos
DF	(Australia) Arno Bertogna
DF	(Australia) Darren Stewart
MF	(Socialist Federal Republic of Yugoslavia) Burim Zajmi	(substituted off) 94'
MF	(Australia) Terry Butler	(substituted off) 74'
FW	(Australia) Hilton Phillips
FW	(Australia) Alex Bundalo
FW	(Australia) Rod Brown
FW	(Scotland) Lawrie McKinna
Substitutes:
DF	(Australia) Kurt Reynolds	(substituted on) 74'
MF	(Australia) Joe Watson	(substituted on) 94'
Head Coach:
(Australia) Rale Rasic

GK	(Australia) Peter Laumets
DF	(Australia) Mehmet Durakovic
DF	(Scotland) Brian Brown
DF	(Australia) John Yzendoorn
DF	(Australia) Joe Palatsides
MF	(Australia) Vlatko Belic
MF	(Australia) Garry McDowall
FW	(Australia) Scott Patterson
FW	(England) Sean Lane	(substituted off) 107'
FW	(Australia) Charlie Egan
FW	(Australia) Andrew Zinni	(substituted off) 90'
Substitutes:
DF	(Australia) Steve Marley	(substituted on) 90'
FW	(Scotland) Frank McGrellis	(substituted on) 107'
Head Coach:
(Australia) Manfred Schaefer

Match rules

- 90 minutes
- 30 minutes of extra time if necessary
- Penalty shoot-out if scores still level
