= Jim Milisavljevic =

Australian soccer player (1951–2022)

Jim Milisavljević
Personal information
- Full name: Dragoljub Milisavljević
- Date of birth: 15 April 1951
- Place of birth: Melbourne, Victoria, Australia
- Date of death: 23 February 2022 (aged 70)
- Place of death: Melbourne, Victoria, Australia
- Positions: Goalkeeper; striker

Youth career
- 1961–1968: Footscray JUST

Senior career*
Years	Team	Apps	(Gls)
1968–1975	Footscray JUST		
1978–1985	Carlton Serbia		

Managerial career
- Carlton Serbia
- * Club domestic league appearances and goals

Dragoljub "Jim" Milisavljević (Serbian Cyrillic: Драгољуб Милисављевић; 15 April 1951 – 23 February 2022) was an Australian soccer player, referee, coach and administrator who played as a goalkeeper. He was a member of the Australia squad at the 1974 FIFA World Cup, and represented the state of Victoria. Throughout his career he played club football for Melbourne sides Footscray JUST and Carlton Serbia.

== Biography ==
Milisavljević was born in Melbourne on 15 April 1951. Of Serbian heritage, Jims father, Slavoljub, was a member of the Serbian Kings Guard that was captured and imprisoned by German soldiers early in World War 2. After his release at the end of the war, Slavoljub was unable to return to his motherland which had become part of the newly formed communist Yugoslavia. Instead, he made the decision to migrate his family to Australia. He arrived in Australia in 1949 via Italy on ship with wife Milica and Jim’s older brother Dusan. Jim was born shortly after in 1951.

A natural athlete, Milisavljević took to both soccer and Australian rules football in his youth. At age 10 he joined Melbourne's Yugoslav community club Footscray JUST whilst simultaneously playing Aussie rules at school, eventually leading to a junior leave stint at the Carlton Football Club. He made his senior debut for J.U.S.T in 1968 at the age of 17 as a reserve to Marko Fode. It was at this point that Milisavljević deciding to commit himself to soccer and departed the Carlton Football Club. He would later credit his rugged goalkeeping skills to his Australian Rules Football background.

In 1970 Milisavljević became the first choice goalkeeper at J.U.S.T. During this period he also began represented the Victorian state team at youth level, captaining the Under-21s team and making his senior debut in 1973. Milisavljević's greatest professional honour came in 1974, when coach Rale Rašić selected him to represent Australia in goals alongside team mates Jack Reilly and Allan Maher at the 1974 FIFA World Cup in West Germany.

Following the tournament Milisavljević underwent (his third) wrist surgery which significantly setback his goalkeeping abilities. One of Milisavljević's carrier highlights came in the 1975 Ampol Night Cup when he scored the match-winning goal for J.U.S.T in his last game for the club, triumphing over South Melbourne Hellas after being put on as an impact striker during extra-time by coach Čedo Ćirković. Milisavljević went on to become a qualified soccer referee, though his career was cut short due to the introduction of age limitations that prevented him from adjudicating senior matches.

In 1978 Milisavljević returned to soccer joining lower tier side Carlton Serbia as a coach and (utility) player. Following his second retirement from active football Milisavljević remained with Carlton Serbia in an administrative capacity, helped drive the club towards further promotions at state level. He would later serve as a commissioner in Football Victoria and a functionary at Springvale White Eagles F. C. In his later years Milisavljević continued providing coaching tuition to aspiring goalkeepers whilst remaining an active figure in Australia's soccer community.

Milisavljević died in Melbourne on 23 February 2022, at the age of 70. His funeral liturgy was held at the Holy Trinity Serbian Orthodox Church, Brunswick East, and was buried in Springvale Botanical Cemetery. He is survived by his wife Milica, son Milan, daughter Miriam, and his seven grandchildren Stefan, Marko, Kristijan, Jovana, Petar, Nikola, and Luka.
