= Frank Micic =

Australian soccer player

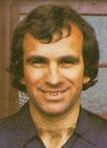

Personal information
- Full name: Franko Mičić
- Date of birth: 29 October 1940 (age 86)
- Place of birth: Zadar, Croatia, Yugoslavia
- Position: Midfielder

Senior career*
Years	Team	Apps	(Gls)
1959–1967	J.U.S.T.	175	(17)
1968	South Melbourne Hellas	22	(9)
1969–1977	Footscray J.U.S.T.	194	(31)
1978–1979	St Kilda Hakoah	4	(0)
Total		395	(57)

International career^{‡}
1967–1971	Australia	6	(1)
- * Club domestic league appearances and goals ‡ National team caps and goals as of 14 July 2011

Franko Mičić (born 29 October 1940) is a former soccer player. Mičić played the majority of his senior career in the Victorian State League for Footscray J.U.S.T. with short stints with South Melbourne Hellas and St Kilda Hakoah. He played a single season with J.U.S.T. in the National Soccer League (NSL). Born in Yugoslavia, he played in six international matches for the Australia national soccer team.

== Early life ==
Mičić was born in Zadar, Yugoslavia, modern-day Croatia. As a teenager, his family left to migrate to the United States. Mičić only made it as far as Italy where he played local football. At the age of 19, he migrated from Italy to Australia.

== Playing career ==
=== Club career ===
On arriving in Australia, Mičić joined J.U.S.T. making his debut in the Victorian State League in 1959 after two reserve grade appearances.

Mičić joined South Melbourne ahead of the 1968 season, with the Hellas paying A$7,000 for his services. He returned to J.U.S.T. for the 1969 season.

After playing in Footscray J.U.S.T.'s first season in the National Soccer League, Mičić transferred to St Kilda Hakoah for the 1978 Victorian State League season as a playing coach. Mičić was replaced as Hakoah coach in mid-1979.

=== State career ===
He played 55 games for the state team of Victoria, captaining the team for six years.

=== International career ===
Mičić played six full international matches for Australia, scoring once.

== Honours ==
Footscray J.U.S.T.

- Victorian State League Champion: 1963, 1969, 1971, 1973
- Dockerty Cup: 1963, 1976
- Ampol Cup: (Note: known as the Sun Cup in 1960) 1960, 1966, 1975
- State League Cup: 1974, 1975, 1976

Individual

- Bill Fleming Medal: (Note: known as the Argus Medal before 1970) 1964, 1967, 1973
- Football Victoria Hall of Fame: 2022
