= Footscray Capri SC =

Footscray Capri
- Full name: Footscray Capri Soccer Club
- Nickname: Capri
- Founded: 1950 as Footscray City
- Dissolved: 1961 (alleged amalgamation with JUST)
- Ground: Henry Turner Reserve, Footscray

Footscray Capri (Footscray Capri Soccer Club) is a defunct Australian football (soccer) club that was based in Footscray, Victoria. The club was founded in 1958 by migrants from Italy.

== Statistics by season ==
Season	League	Pld	W	D	L	GF	GA	GD	Pts	Table Position
1958	Victorian Division 1 North	18	15	2	1	67	15	+52	32	1 (Champion)
1959	Victorian State League	22	3	7	12	31	65	-34	13	10
1960	Victorian State League	22	5	1	16	25	71	-46	11	12 (Relegated)
1961	Victorian Division 1 North	18	8	4	6	46	37	+9	20	5

== Honours ==
- Victorian League 1 Division North: Champions 1958

== International players ==
- (Australia) Robert Wemyss
