= Herminio Toñánez =

Paraguayan footballer (born 1946)

Personal information
- Full name: Herminio Rafael Toñánez Almada
- Date of birth: 9 March 1946 (age 80)
- Place of birth: Paraguay
- Position: Defender

Youth career
- 1961–1963: Nacional

Senior career*
| Years | Team | Apps | (Gls) |
| 1963–1969 | Nacional | ? | (?) |
| 1969–1975 | Sevilla FC | 46 | (0) |
| 1975–1979 | Recreativo Huelva | ? | (?) |
| 1979–1981 | Futbol Club Andorra | ? | (?) |
| 1981 | St George Saints | ? | (?) |

International career
| 1968 | Paraguay | ? | (?) |
- * Club domestic league appearances and goals

Herminio Rafael Toñánez Almada (born 9 March 1946 in Paraguay) is a Paraguayan former football defender.

== Career ==
He started his career at Nacional of Paraguay making his debut with the first team in 1963, before being transferred to Sevilla FC of Spain in 1969. Toñánez also played for Recreativo Huelva and Principado de Andorra of the Catalonia 3rd division region. His career ended in Australian side St George Saints where he only spent a month due to a disagreement in the contract.
