= Vlada Stošić =

Serbian retired footballer (born 1965)

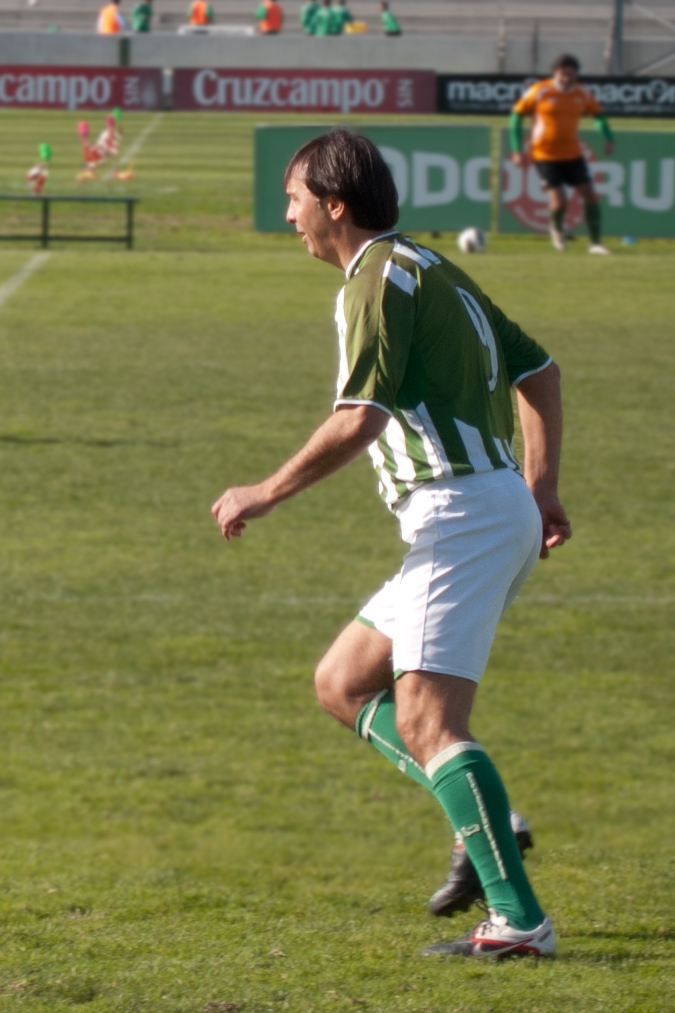
- Stošić in Betis gear in 2013

Personal information
- Date of birth: 31 January 1965 (age 61)
- Place of birth: Vranje, SR Serbia, SFR Yugoslavia
- Height: 1.79 m (5 ft 10 in)
- Position: Midfielder

Youth career
- Dinamo Vranje

Senior career*
Years	Team	Apps	(Gls)
1984–1991	Red Star Belgrade	105	(16)
1986–1987	→ Footscray JUST (loan)	25	(3)
1987	→ Rad (loan)	5	(0)
1988	→ Radnički Niš (loan)	16	(6)
1992–1994	Mallorca	95	(27)
1994–1996	Betis	72	(7)
1997	Atlante	16	(2)
1997–1998	Vitória Setúbal	16	(0)
Total		350	(61)

International career
1990	Yugoslavia	1	(0)
- * Club domestic league appearances and goals

Vlada Stošić (Serbian Cyrillic: Влада Стошић; born 31 January 1965) is a Serbian former professional footballer who played as a midfielder.

He is best known for his spell with Red Star Belgrade in the 1980s and 1990s, being part of the side's European Cup victory in 1991.

== Club career ==
Stošić was born in Vranje, Socialist Federal Republic of Yugoslavia. During his early career he represented Red Star Belgrade, who also loaned him to FK Rad, FK Radnicki Nis and a club in Australia. In Red Star's 1990–91 victorious campaign in the European Cup, he played the last minutes of the final match, which went into extra time as the team emerged victorious over Olympique de Marseille after a penalty shootout.

Stošić played in the last edition of the Yugoslavian League before he left for Spain in January 1992, where he proceeded to be an undisputed starter for both RCD Mallorca and Real Betis, although he was relegated in his debut season with the former. After failing to feature in the first half of 1996–97 with the latter, he moved to Mexico with Atlante FC, where he teamed up with former Red Star teammate Miodrag Belodedici; he closed out his career the ensuing summer at the age of 33, with Portugal's Vitória de Setúbal.

Stošić returned to Betis in 2010, working with the Andalusians as director of football. He was relieved of his duties on 22 December 2013, shortly after manager Pepe Mel, due to poor results.

== International career ==
On 12 September 1990, Stošić earned his sole cap for Yugoslavia, in Belfast against Northern Ireland: it consisted of one minute, as he came on as a substitute for Dragan Stojković in a 2–0 win for the UEFA Euro 1992 qualifiers, with the nation winning its group but not being allowed to participate.
