= Mike Hollifield =

English footballer

Personal information
- Date of birth: 2 May 1961 (age 65)
- Place of birth: Middlesbrough, England
- Position: Full back

Senior career*
Years	Team	Apps	(Gls)
1980–1982	Wolverhampton Wanderers	21	(0)
1983–1985	Hull City	45	(1)
1985–1986	Tranmere Rovers	1	(0)
1986	Billingham Synthonia	1	(0)
1988–1989	Wollongong City	48	(1)
1989–1990	South Bank		
1990–1992	Wollongong City	34	(1)
Total		150	(3)
- * Club domestic league appearances and goals

Mike Hollifield is a footballer who played as a full back in the Football League for Wolverhampton Wanderers, Hull City and Tranmere Rovers. He finished his playing career in two stints with Wollongong City in the Australian National Soccer League.
