= Vlado Bozinovski =

Australian footballer

Personal information
- Date of birth: 30 March 1964 (age 62)
- Place of birth: Ohrid, SFR Yugoslavia
- Height: 1.80 m (5 ft 11 in)
- Position: Midfielder

Senior career*
| Years | Team | Apps | (Gls) |
| 1982–1983 | Hellas-Hakoah | 33 | (3) |
| 1984–1985 | South Melbourne | 13 | (1) |
| 1985–1989 | Footscray JUST | 61 | (7) |
| 1989 | Club Brugge | 6 | (0) |
| 1989–1990 | Beira-Mar | 32 | (2) |
| 1990–1991 | Sporting CP | 11 | (0) |
| 1991–1992 | Beira-Mar | 23 | (1) |
| 1992–1993 | Ipswich Town | 9 | (0) |
| 1993–1995 | Paços Ferreira | 60 | (2) |
| 1995–1996 | Felgueiras | 20 | (0) |
| 1996 | Tiong Bahru United | | |
| 1996–1998 | Ankaragücü | 46 | (6) |
| 1998 | Tanjong Pagar United | | |
| 1999–2000 | Home United | | |
| 2001 | Clementi Khalsa | 19 | (2) |
| Total | | 333 | (24) |

International career
| 1988 | Australia U23 | 3 | (0) |
| 1988–1992 | Australia | 6 | (1) |

Managerial career
- 2001: Clementi Khalsa (player-coach)
- * Club domestic league appearances and goals

Vlado Bozinovski (born 30 March 1964) is a retired professional soccer player who played as a defensive midfielder. Born in Yugoslavia, he played for the Australia national team.

== Club career ==
Bozinovski immigrated to Australia in his teens, going on to play football in the country for South Melbourne FC and Footscray JUST. In 1989, aged 25, and following a very brief spell in Belgium, he moved to Portugal and joined S.C. Beira-Mar, appearing in 32 league games as the Aveiro club retained its top division status.

Staying in the country, Bozinovski signed for giants Sporting Clube de Portugal but, after one single season, returned to his previous club and, in the following year, signed for Ipswich Town in the Premier League. He appeared in only one fourth of the games for the Blues, who only narrowly avoided relegation.

In the 1993 summer, Bozinovski returned to Portugal, representing F.C. Paços de Ferreira and F.C. Felgueiras, playing two out of three seasons in the top flight. He signed for S.League club Tiong Bahru United in May 1999. He left for Turkey the same year where he competed in the 1996–97 Süper Lig with Ankaragücü. The 33-year-old then returned to Singapore, where he played for Tanjong Pagar United FC, Home United FC and Clementi Khalsa FC, the latter as a player-coach until he was relieved of his coaching duties in September 2001. He retired at the end of the 2001 season.

Subsequently, Bozinovski became a players agent.

== International career ==
Bozinovski gained six caps for Australia, scoring once in the process. His debut took place on 13 June 1988, in a 1–0 friendly win with the United States in Orlando, Florida.

Additionally, Bozinovski represented the nation at the 1988 Summer Olympics in Seoul, appearing twice as a substitute in an eventual quarterfinal exit.
