= George Harris (soccer, born 1949) =

Australian soccer player

Personal information
- Full name: George Harris
- Date of birth: 6 February 1949 (age 77)
- Position: Defender

Youth career
- San Souci

Senior career*
Years	Team	Apps	(Gls)
1968–1979	St George		
1980	Blacktown City	21	(0)

International career^{‡}
1971–1978	Australia	28	(0)
- * Club domestic league appearances and goals as of 21 April 2022 ‡ National team caps and goals as of 13 April 2009

George Harris (born 6 February 1949) is an Australian former soccer player. Harris played 28 full international matches for Australia and is a member of the Football Australia Hall of Fame.

== Playing career ==
Harris played youth football for Sans Souci before joining St George-Budapest. He played for St George for over a decade, including the first three years of the National Soccer League (NSL).

In 1980, Harris moved to Blacktown City on a free transfer where he played a single season in the NSL.
