= Ethnic groups in Yugoslavia =

Overview of ethnic groups in former Yugoslavia

The ethnic groups in Yugoslavia were grouped into constitutive peoples and minorities.

Ethnic groups in Yugoslavia (1981)
1. Serbs (36.3%)
2. Croats (19.7%)
3. ethnic Muslims (8.90%)
4. Slovenes (7.80%)
5. Albanians (7.70%)
6. Macedonians (6.00%)
7. Montenegrins (2.60%)
8. Hungarians (1.90%)
9. Yugoslavs (5.40%)
10. Others combined (3.70%)

== First Yugoslavia ==
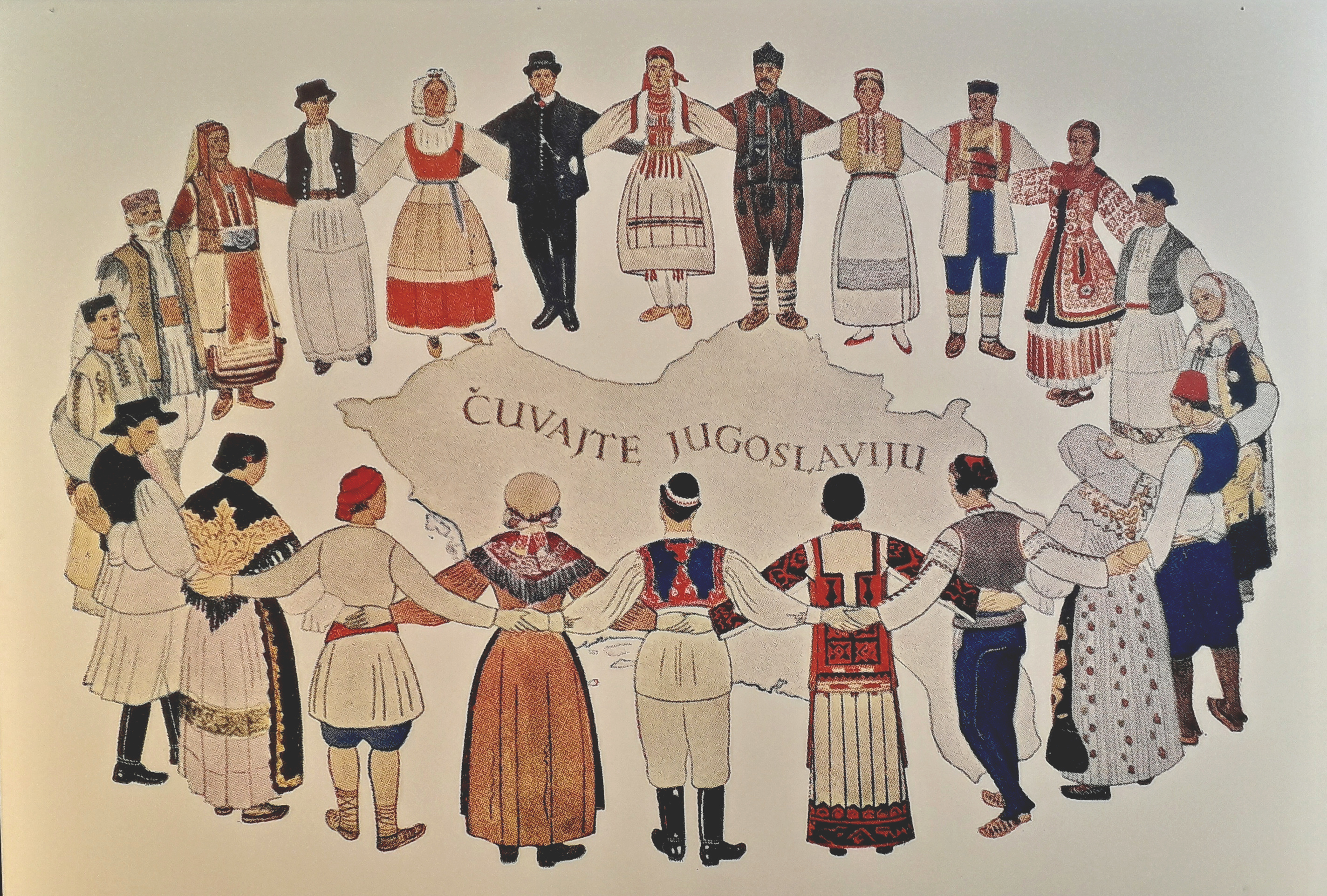
"Keep/Protect Yugoslavia" (Čuvajte Jugoslaviju), a variant of the alleged last words of King Alexander, in an illustration of Yugoslav peoples dancing the kolo.

The constituent peoples of the Kingdom of Serbs, Croats and Slovenes (1918–29), as evident by the official name of the state (although it was colloquially known as "Yugoslavia") were the Serbs, Croats and Slovenes.

The 1921 population census recorded numerous ethnic groups. Based on language, the "Yugoslavs" (collectively Serbs, Croats, Slovenes and Slavic Muslims) constituted 82.87 percent of the country's population.

Identity politics failed to assimilate the South Slavic peoples of Yugoslavia into a Yugoslav identity. During the reign of King Aleksandar I, a modern single Yugoslav identity policy that was propagated to erase the existing ethnic identities failed to do so.

== Second Yugoslavia ==
Communist Yugoslav terminology used the word "nation" (nacija, narod) for the country's constitutive peoples (konstitutivne nacije), that is, for the Serbs, Croats, Slovenes, Muslims, Macedonians, and Montenegrins. The term "nationality" (narodnost) was used to describe the status of the Albanians and Hungarians, and other non-constitutive peoples, distinguishing them from the nations, and "national minorities" (nacionalne manjine) which they were previously described as.

Following the Liberation of Yugoslavia, the Communist Party of Yugoslavia reorganized the country into federal republics (Serbia, Croatia, Bosnia and Herzegovina, Slovenia, Macedonia, and Montenegro), five of them being eponymous states of each constitutive nation, i.e. Serbs, Croats, Slovenes, Macedonians and Montenegrins, and unique multiethnic Bosnia and Herzegovina. Furthermore, two autonomous provinces were created within Serbia – Vojvodina (inhabited by a Hungarian minority) and Kosovo and Metohija (inhabited by an Albanian minority), based on the significant presence of those nationalities (i.e. narodnost) in those regions. This minority criterion (a combination of historical and ethnic criteria) was only applied to Serbia (and not Italian-inhabited Istria, or Serb-inhabited parts of Croatia, for example). Istrian Italians, who had been persecuted and exiled by the Communist regime for Italian involvement and irredentism during World War II in Yugoslavia, had their calls for autonomy repudiated by the Communist government; between 1947–1960 vast majority of ethnic Italians fled Yugoslavia while the remainder adopted Croatian or Slovene identities. The presence of constitutive peoples in territories other than their "nation state" (i.e. Serbs in Croatia) was rejected as a basis for potential autonomous provinces, as Communist rhetoric maintained that each constituent people had a home republic, and was therefore unable to obtain autonomy status in another republic despite significant presence. Furthermore, a constitutive nation could not be considered a minority in any of the republics.

After the war, the slogan "Brotherhood and unity" designated the official policy of inter-ethnic relations in the country. The policy prescribed that Yugoslavia's peoples were equal groups that coexist peacefully in the federation.

The 1974 Yugoslav Constitution provided for equality of the constituent peoples and minorities.

== Censuses ==
=== First Yugoslavia ===
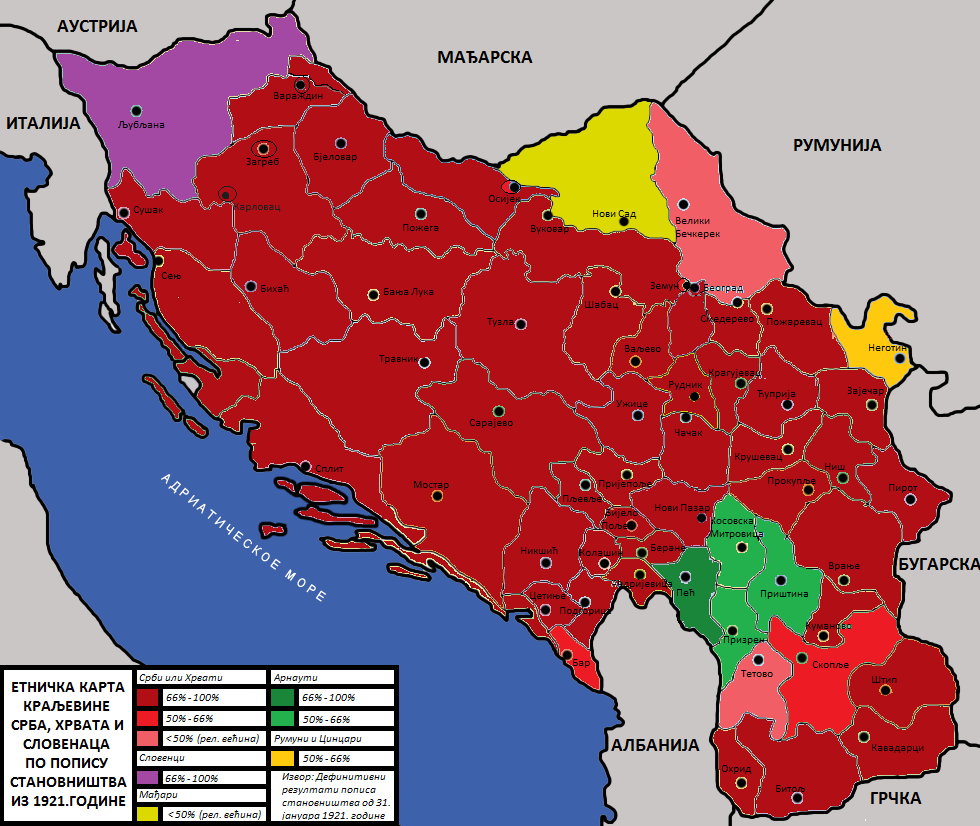
Ethnic groups in Yugoslavia according to the 1921 census Serbs or Croats (66%-100%) Serbs or Croats (50%-66%) Serbs or Croats (<50%, relative majority) Slovenes (66%-100%) Arnauts (66%-100%) Arnauts (50%-66%) Hungarians (<50%, relative majority) Romanians and Cincars (50%-60%)

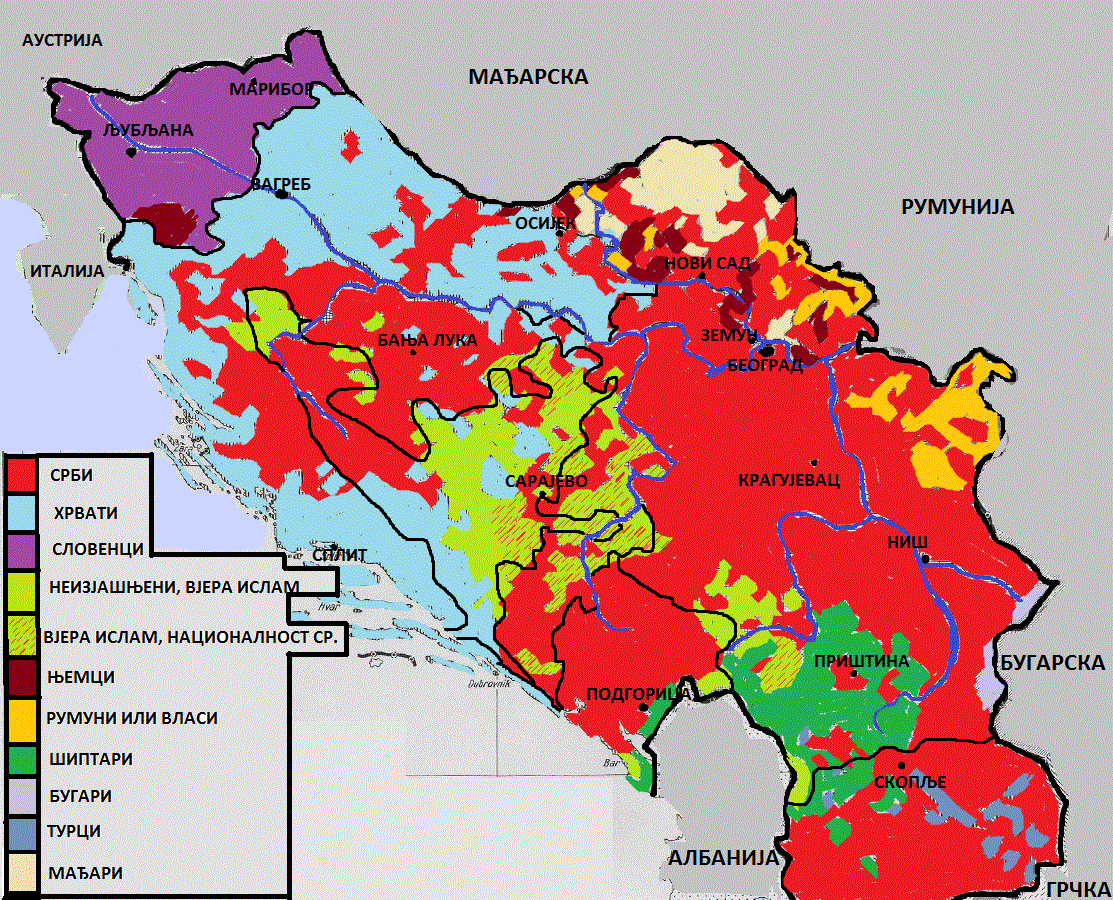
Ethnic groups in Yugoslavia according to the 1931 census Serbs Croats Slovenes Undeclared, Islamic faith Islamic faith, Serb nationality Germans Romanians or Vlachs Shqiptar Bulgarians Turks Hungarians

=== Second Yugoslavia ===
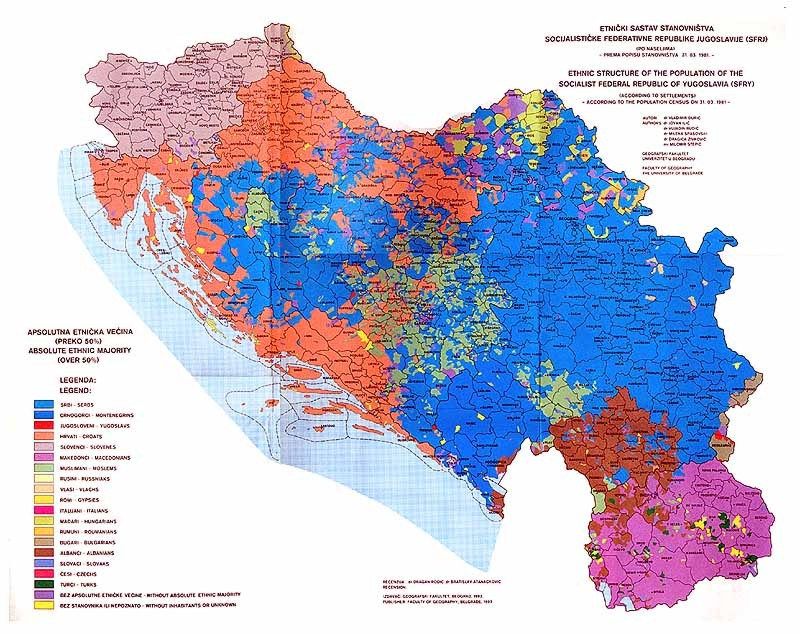
Ethnic groups in Yugoslavia, by majority in municipalities, according to the 1981 census (in Serbo-Croatian and English).

Group	1953	1961	1971	1981
Serbs	7,065,923 (41.7%)	7,806,152 (42.7%)	8,143,246 (39.7%)	8,136,578 (36.3%)
Croats	3,975,550 (23.5%)	4,293,809 (23.1%)	4,526,782 (22.1%)	4,428,135 (19.7%)
Ethnic Muslims	998,698 (5.9%)	972,940 (5.2%)	1,729,932 (8.4%)	2,000,034 (8.9%)
Slovenes	1,487,100 (8.8%)	1,589,211 (8.6%)	1,678,032 (8.2%)	1,753,605 (7.8%)
Albanians	754,245 (4.5%)	914,733 (4.9%)	1,309,523 (6.4%)	1,731,253 (7.7%)
Macedonians	893,427 (5.3%)	1,045,513 (5.3%)	1,194,784 (5.8%)	1,341,420 (6.0%)
Yugoslavs	N/A	317,124 (1.7%)	273,077 (1.3%)	1,216,463 (5.4%)
Montenegrins	466,093 (2.7%)	513,832 (2.8%)	508,843 (2.5%)	577,298 (2.6%)
Hungarians	502,175 (3.0%)	504,369 (2.7%)	477,374 (2.3%)	426,865 (1.9%)
Others

== Terminology ==
- narod (pl. narodi) – people, folk, ethnic group
- narodnost (pl. narodnosti) – ethnicity
- nacija (pl. nacije) – nation
- nacionalnost (pl. nacionalnosti) – nationality, citizenry

== Annotations ==
1. Including ethnic groups lesser than 1% (1981 census), such as Romani, Turks, Slovaks, Romanians, Aromanians, Megleno-Romanians, Istro-Romanians, Bulgarians, Ruthenians, Czechs, Italians, Rusyns, Germans, Russians, Jews, Poles, and Greeks. There were also "others" and "unspecified".

== See also ==
- Ethnic groups in Bosnia and Herzegovina
- Ethnic groups in Croatia
- Ethnic groups in Kosovo
- Ethnic groups in North Macedonia
- Ethnic groups in Montenegro
- Ethnic groups in Serbia
- Ethnic groups in Slovenia

== Sources ==
- Jović, Dejan (2009). Yugoslavia: A State that Withered Away. Purdue University Press. ISBN 978-1-55753-495-8.
- Nielsen, Christian Axboe (2014). Making Yugoslavs: Identity in King Aleksandar's Yugoslavia. University of Toronto Press. ISBN 978-1-4426-2750-5.
- Sobolevski, Mihael (2000). H.-G. Fleck; I. Graovac (eds.). "Nacionalne manjine u Kraljevini Jugoslaviji". Dijalog povjesničara–istoričara. 2: 395–410.
- Stojković, L.; Martić, M. (1952). National minorities in Yugoslavia. Jugoslavija.
- Trbovich, Ana S. (2008). A Legal Geography of Yugoslavia's Disintegration. Oxford University Press. ISBN 978-0-19-533343-5.
