= Rudolfo Gnavi =

Argentine footballer

Rodolfo Gnavi
Personal information
- Full name: Rodolfo Aníbal Gnavi
- Date of birth: 17 September 1949 (age 77)
- Place of birth: Argentina
- Position: Midfielder

Senior career*
Years	Team	Apps	(Gls)
- Argentinos Juniors
1973	Club Toluca		
1974–1976	Pan Hellenic		
1977–1980	St. George	68	(4)

International career
1975	Australia	1	(0)
- * Club domestic league appearances and goals

Rodolfo Gnavi (born 17 September 1949 in Argentina) is a former footballer who played one match for the Australia national association football team.

== Playing career ==
=== Club career ===
After stints at Argentinos Juniors and Club Atlético Lanús in Argentina and Club Toluca in Mexico, Gnavi arrived in Australia in 1974 to play for Pan Hellenic in the New South Wales State League. In 1977, he transferred to St. George for $9,000. He played 68 National Soccer League matches for St. George between 1977 and 1980.

=== International career ===
Gnavi played one match for Australia in 1975 against the USSR.
