= Paul Kay (soccer) =

Australian soccer player

Personal information
- Date of birth: 18 May 1962 (age 64)
- Height: 1.70 m (5 ft 7 in)
- Position: Midfielder

Senior career*
Years	Team	Apps	(Gls)
1978	Newcastle KB United	3	(0)
1978–1980	St. George	30	(2)
1981	Wollongong Wolves	6	(0)
1982–1983	Charlton Athletic	0	(0)
1983–1986	Sydney City	64	(4)
1986–1988	Blacktown City	11+	(2+)
1989–1991	Wollongong Macedonia	23	(0)

International career
1980–1981	Australia	3	(0)
- * Club domestic league appearances and goals

Paul Kay is an Australian former soccer player. Kay played 137 matches in the National Soccer League between 1978 and 1991 for Newcastle KB United, St. George, Wollongong City, Sydney City, Blacktown City, and Wollongong Macedonia. He also spent a stint in England for Charlton Athletic but was unable to break into the first team.

== Playing career ==
=== Club career ===
Kay joined St George in 1978.

In late 1981, Kay headed to England to trial with Second Division team Charlton Athletic. After ten weeks with the club, he signed a two-year contract with a $10,000 transfer fee.

On his return to Australia, Kay signed for Sydney City, though his return was delayed by a dispute between his new club and his former club Wollongong Wolves over his contract status. Kay transferred from Sydney City to Blacktown City mid-way through the 1986 National Soccer League season with the fee reported to be $9,000.

=== International career ===
Kay made his debut for Australia at the 1980 Oceania Cup. He scored four times at the tournament, including two goals in the final, which Australia won 4–2 over Tahiti. Because of the nature of the opposition, only one match of the tournament counted as a full international match. He only played two further full international matches for Australia, the last being against Taiwan in September 1981.

== Career statistics ==
Appearances and goals by club, season and competition
Club	Season	League		
Club	Season	Division	Apps	Goals
Newcastle KB United	1978	National Soccer League	3	0
Newcastle KB United	Total		3	0
St George	1978	National Soccer League	7	0
St George	1979	National Soccer League	6	0
St George	1980	National Soccer League	17	2
St George	Total		30	2
Wollongong Wolves	1981	National Soccer League	6	0
Wollongong Wolves	Total		6	0
Charlton Athletic	1981–82	Second Division	0	0
Charlton Athletic	1982–83	Second Division	0	0
Charlton Athletic	Total		0	0
Sydney City	1983	National Soccer League	24	1
Sydney City	1984	National Soccer League	27	3
Sydney City	1985	National Soccer League	10	0
Sydney City	1986	National Soccer League	3	0
Sydney City	Total		64	4
Blacktown City	1986	National Soccer League	11	2
Blacktown City	1987	NSW Division 1		
Blacktown City	1988	NSW Division 1		
Wollongong Macedonia	1989	NSW Division 1		
Wollongong Macedonia	1990	NSW Division 1		
Wollongong Macedonia	1990–91	National Soccer League	23	0
