= Danny Crainie =

Scottish footballer

Personal information
- Full name: Daniel Crainie
- Date of birth: 24 May 1962 (age 64)
- Place of birth: Kilsyth, Scotland
- Position: Winger

Youth career
- Celtic

Senior career*
Years	Team	Apps	(Gls)
1979–1983	Celtic	27	(7)
1983–1985	Wolverhampton Wanderers	64	(4)
1985	→ Blackpool (loan)	6	(0)
1985	Brunswick Juventus	?	(?)
1986	→ Dundee (loan)	3	(0)
1986–1987	South Melbourne	39	(10)
1988–1990	Wollongong City	78	(7)
1990–1992	Airdrieonians	31	(1)
1992–1995	Kilmarnock	23	(2)
1994	→ Ballymena United (loan)	14	(3)
1995	Ross County	5	(0)
1995–1996	Cork City	3	(1)
1996–1997	Bo'ness United		

International career
1982	Scotland U21	1	(0)
- * Club domestic league appearances and goals

Daniel Crainie (born 24 May 1962) is a Scottish retired association football player who played for twelve football clubs in Scotland, England, Australia and Ireland.

Crainie began his football career at Celtic where he scored seven goals and making sixteen appearances in his debut season for the Scottish club. He played only a few games in his following two seasons at Celtic before moving to England to play for Wolverhampton. Crainie made over 60 appearances for the Wolves which would be more than he would make for any other club. During his time at Wolverhampton he was loaned out to Blackpool where he made six appearances.

After a short spell at Dundee Crainie left Britain for Australia, where he played for South Melbourne. Crainie played a total of 39 times for South Melbourne, scoring ten times, more than he did at any other team.

In 1988 Crainie left Melbourne for the New South Wales coastal city of Wollongong, where he would play more than 50 games for Wollongong City and also earned himself a minor premiership with his first season at the club.

Crainie returned to the British Isles in the twilight of his career, where he played for Airdrieonians, Kilmarnock, Ballymena United, Ross County, Cork City and Bo'ness United.
