= Jean-Paul de Marigny =

Australian footballer and coach (born 1964)

Personal information
- Full name: Jean-Paul de Marigny
- Date of birth: 21 January 1964 (age 62)
- Place of birth: Port Louis, Mauritius
- Position: Defender

Team information
- Current team: Sabah (Head Coach)

Youth career
- APIA Leichhardt
- Sydney City

Senior career*
| Years | Team | Apps | (Gls) |
| 1981–1982 | AIS | | |
| 1983–1987 | Sydney City | 57 | (3) |
| 1987–1988 | APIA Leichhardt | 44 | (4) |
| 1989–1997 | Marconi Stallions | 188 | (13) |
| 1997–1998 | Sydney Olympic | 15 | (0) |

International career
| 1987–1990 | Australia | 7 | (0) |

Managerial career
- 2003–2004: Marconi Stallions
- 2006: Sydney United
- 2007: NSWIS
- 2007: Australia U17
- 2010–2013: Sydney United
- 2013: Marconi Stallions
- 2015: Newcastle Jets (assistant)
- 2015–2018: Melbourne Victory (assistant)
- 2018–2020: Western Sydney Wanderers (assistant)
- 2020: Western Sydney Wanderers
- 2021: Melbourne Victory (assistant)
- 2023–2024: Western Sydney Wanderers (assistant)
- 2024–2025: Australia U17 (assistant)
- 2025: Sabah
- * Club domestic league appearances and goals

Jean-Paul de Marigny (born 21 January 1964 in Mauritius) is a football manager and former player who is former manager of Malaysia Super League club Sabah.

== Managerial career ==
=== Melbourne Victory ===
de Marigny served as an assistant coach of A-League side Melbourne Victory from 2013 to 2015, departing on 22 May 2015 to return home to Sydney to be with family and support his wife Donna who underwent breast surgery for cancer.

=== Newcastle Jets ===
On 18 June 2015, de Marigny was announced as assistant coach of the Newcastle Jets, under Scott Miller.

=== Return to Melbourne Victory ===
On 31 May 2016, de Marigny returned to Melbourne Victory.

=== Western Sydney Wanderers ===
On 6 June 2018 Western Sydney Wanderers announced that de Marigny was joining the club to take over the vacant assistant coach position. Following the sacking of head coach Markus Babbel on 20 January 2020, de Marigny was named as the caretaker head coach for the club. He was released on 12 October 2020 after a statement was released by the club. His replacement was Carl Robinson.

=== Second return to Melbourne Victory ===
On 10 March 2021, de Marigny returned to Melbourne Victory as an assistant coach.

=== Sabah ===
On 13 August 2025, de Marigny got his first overseas managerial role as he signed a deal with Malaysia Super League club Sabah as their head coach.

== Managerial statistics ==
As of 18 December 2025

Managerial record by team and tenure
| Team | Nat. | From | To | Record | | | | | Ref. |
| Team | Nat. | From | To | G | W | D | L | Win % | Ref. |
|---|---|---|---|---|---|---|---|---|---|
| Western Sydney Wanderers | (Australia) | 20 January 2020 | 12 October 2020 | 12 | 5 | 4 | 3 | 41.67 | |
| Sabah | (Malaysia) | 13 August 2025 | 18 December 2025 | 17 | 5 | 7 | 5 | 29.41 | |
| Career Total | | | | 29 | 10 | 11 | 8 | 34.48 | |
