= Doug Utjesenovic =

Australian soccer player

Doug Utješenović
Personal information
- Full name: Dragan Utješenović
- Date of birth: 8 October 1946 (age 80)
- Place of birth: Belgrade, PR Serbia, FPR Yugoslavia
- Height: 1.76 m (5 ft 9 1/2 in)
- Position: Defender

Senior career*
Years	Team	Apps	(Gls)
1967–1969	OFK Belgrade	9	(0)
1969–1970	Footscray JUST		
1971–1980	St. George Budapest		
1980–1981	Kui Tan SC	12	(3)

International career
1972–1976	Australia	61	(2)

Managerial career
- 1988: APIA Leichhardt
- 1997-1998: Parramatta Eagles
- 2000-2001: Bonnyrigg White Eagles
- * Club domestic league appearances and goals

Dragan "Doug" Utješenović (Serbian Cyrillic: Драган Утјешеновић; born 8 October 1946) is a former soccer player who played as a defender. Born in Yugoslavia, he was a member of the Australian 1974 FIFA World Cup squad in West Germany. He went on to make 61 appearances for the team between 1972 and 1976, scoring two goals, as well as representing both New South Wales and Victoria.

Utješenović played his club football in both Yugoslavia and Australia, playing for OFK Beograd, Footscray JUST, St George Budapest and Hong Kong Second Division side Kui Tan, before coaching APIA Leichhardt in 1988, Parramatta Eagles 1997 and 1998, and Bonnyrigg White Eagles 2000 to 2001.
