= Footscray JUST =

Australian football club

- Full name: Footscray Jugoslav United Soccer Team
- Nicknames: JUST; Footscray; Blues (Plavi)
- Founded: 1950; 76 years ago as Jugoslav United Soccer Team
- Dissolved: 1990; 36 years ago (Under new ownership as Footscray City & Melbourne City Football Club)
- Ground: Schintler Reserve, Footscray (1961–1990); Western Oval (1980)
Home colours	Away colours

Footscray Jugoslav United Soccer Team, commonly referred to as J.U.S.T, Footscray or simply JUST, was an association football club from Melbourne, Australia. The club was established by Yugoslav migrants in 1950, and was a founding member of the National Soccer League.

== History ==
=== Early years (1950–1961) ===
The football team JUST was founded through the initiative of Ivan Kuketz (Serbo-Croatian: Kukec), a Melbourne hotelier and vice president of Brighton Soccer Club.

Kuketz was impressed by post-war migrant footballers from Yugoslavia and Czechoslovakia who had recently joined Brighton. Kuketz, himself an immigrant of Croatian descent had migrated to Australia in the 1930s envisioned a team composed solely of players from the respective nations of the new club members. With the assistance of Jovan "John" Ivanovic, Kuketz took the new arrivals from Brighton and began scouting players from migrant camps throughout Victoria and New South Wales, with a great many gathered from the Bonegilla facility. In March 1950 the Jugoslav United Soccer Team was officially established with Kuketz as its first president, whilst the club quickly became known by its acronym JUST.

JUST rapidly progressed in their debut season winning the Victorian Division Three South in 1950. The team comfortably achieved promotion to the Victorian Division One after winning the second tier in 1951. JUST also topped a successful year by being crowned Dockerty Cup champions following a 1–0 triumph over Brighton. JUST narrowly missed out on the league title in 1952 and 1953, finishing 3rd in both seasons, and in 5th place the following three years before securing their first title in 1957, and ended the five season league dominance of Juventus. The following year JUST struggled to maintain their successful run in the newly renamed Victorian State League, slumping to 10th spot, the club's worst finish since formation.

=== 1961–1977 ===
JUST were the dominant entity in an amalgamation with the Italian backed Footscray Capri in 1961. The club was renamed to Footscray Jugoslav United Soccer Team and permanently relocated to Schintler Reserve. The arrival of club legend Zvonimir "Rale" Rasic and Aleksandar Jagodić as new coach in 1962 made a swift impact as the team won the Victorian State League in 1963 and Dockerty Cup that same year, winning 4–2 against Marabyinong Polonia. The following season JUST narrowly missed out on back-to-back league titles, losing out to South Melbourne Hellas by 1 point (equal with George Cross), and finishing runners up after succumbing to a 1–0 defeat against Port Melbourne Slavia in the 1964 Dockerty Cup final.

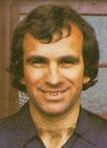
Former captain and club legend Franko Micic represented Footscray J.U.S.T in 18 seasons between 1959 and 1977

The club fluctuated in mid table before ended the 1968 league season in 11th spot, the club's worst placing in a decade. The crisis was averted under coach Rale Rasić who lead JUST to victory in the 1969 league championship before taking on the Australian national team coaching role the following year. JUST had also managed to reach the 1969 Victorian State League Cup final but were defeated. The end of the 1960s ushered in a golden era as JUST were crowned league champions for the fourth time in 1971. The club also reach the 1971 Dockerty Cup final but lost 2–0 to Juventus. League success was achieved for the fifth, and what would be the final time in the club's history in 1973. The Plavi were Victorian State League Cup champions for three consecutive seasons in 1974, 1975, 1976. The team's last Dockerty Cup triumph came in 1976 as JUST won the final 2–0 against Marabyinong Polonia.

=== National Soccer League (1977–1990) ===
Chart of yearly table positions for Footscray JUST in NSL

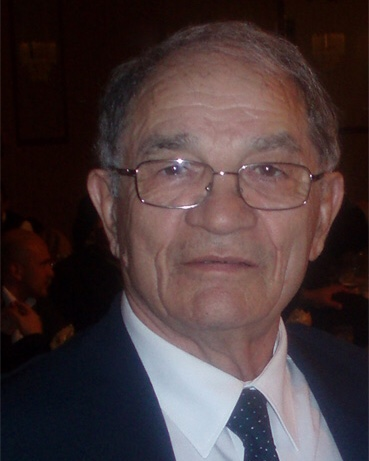
Yugoslav football legend Dragoslav Šekularac coached J.U.S.T to the 1986 NSL conference finals.

In 1977 JUST became a foundation member of the National Soccer League, where they largely struggled, with the exception of 1986, where they lost to Adelaide City in the Southern Conference grand final. In that year Footscray recruited legendary Red Star Belgrade player and trainer Dragoslav Šekularac who also brought with him Vlada Stošić which immediately lifted the club from the bottom to the top of the league.

However poor performances returned and in their final season as members of the NSL in 1989, after the club changed their name to Melbourne City JUST to broaden their appeal and with Schintler Reserve having undergone significant renovations, the club were demoted to the Victoria State League along with fellow Melbourne club Heidelberg United FC after finishing second bottom, recording only five league wins.

Their last NSL home match took place on 10 July 1989, when 1,830 turned up to Schintler Reserve to witness a 1–1 draw with Sydney Olympic. The following week they needed to win final game of the season to avoid relegation but lost to Melbourne Croatia at Middle Park.

=== State Leagues and dissolution (1990–1994) ===
The club performed dismally in the 1990 Victorian State League season, and were relegated after finishing in 15th place. The club was subsequently taken over by the Argentine community which signalled the end of their historic Yugoslav/Serbian connections and effectively the end of the original Footscray JUST.

The club carried on as South Vietnamese club Footscray City and Melbourne City. As of 2025, Melbourne City competes in the Victorian State League Division 4 West competition.

== Crest and colours ==
The kit of JUST mirrored that of the Yugoslavia national team, which in turn was inspired by the Yugoslav tricolour. From the early 1980s the team's shirt corporate sponsor was Jat Airways.

The club crest consisted of a red stylised football with white outline, on a blue background. The words "FOOTSCRAY SOCCER CLUB" were displayed above the football in bold, white lettering whilst the acronym "J.U.S.T" was featured on the bottom.

== Supporters and rivalries ==
The club's main supporter base consisted of ethnic peoples from Yugoslavia who had immigrated to Melbourne. JUST received particularly strong support from ethnic Serbs, although sympathies amongst Croats and Macedonians were torn as both communities had established rival football clubs. JUST maintained warm relations with Sydney affiliates SSC Yugal, whilst the club was perceived by its rivals as having close ties to the Yugoslav communist authorities. The club's player ranks included members of the broad Australian community.

Throughout its history JUST maintained a fierce rivalry with fellow Melbourne club Croatia, which was founded in 1953 by Croatian migrants to the exclusion of other Yugoslav ethnic groups. The rivalry had clear political undertones as Croatia's fan base espoused Croat nationalism and Ustaša allegiance.

A less heated rivalry also existed with Preston Makedonia, a club that further split members of the Yugoslav migrant community. It was founded in 1947 by ethnic Macedonian migrants who developed a political orientation towards Macedonian nationalism.

== Statistics ==
=== NSL record ===
Season	Pld	W	D	L	GF	GA	Pts	Table Position
1977	26	9	6	11	36	39	24	8th of 14
1978	26	7	8	11	29	37	22	12th of 14
1979	26	8	3	15	29	43	20	11th of 14
1980	26	7	9	10	32	41	23	9th of 14
1981	30	9	7	14	32	48	25	13th of 16
1982	30	5	14	11	34	46	24	14th of 16
1983	30	9	9	12	25	42	36	12th of 16
1984	28	10	5	13	29	33	25	8th of 12 (Sth)
1985	22	5	2	15	25	41	12	12th of 12 (Sth)
1986	22	10	8	4	29	27	28	2nd of 12 (Sth)
1987	24	7	8	9	17	27	22	11th of 13
1988	26	7	9	10	34	32	23	10th of 14
1989	26	5	8	13	24	37	18	13th of 14

(Pld)=Games Played, (W)=Wins, (D)=Draws, (L)=Losses, (GF)=Goals For, (GA)=Goals Against, (Pts)=Points, (Sth)=Southern Conference

== Honours ==
- Victorian Division 1/ Victorian State League (5): 1957, 1963, 1969, 1971, 1973
- Victorian Division 2 (1): 1951
- Victorian Division 3 (South) (1): 1950
- National Soccer League (Southern Conference): Finalists 1986
- **Dockerty Cup** (3): 1951, 1963, 1976
- Victorian State League Cup (3): 1974, 1975, 1976
- **Victorian Ampol Night Soccer Cup** (6): 1955, 1956, 1957, 1960, 1965, 1975

== Individual honours ==
Bill Fleming Medal

- 1956 – Pepe Cubero
- 1964 – Frank Micic
- 1967 – Frank Micic
- 1973 – Frank Micic

Victorian Premier League Top Goalscorer Award

- 1971 – Dan Zoraja

NSL U21 Player of the Year

- 1986 – Ernie Tapai

NSL Coach of the Year

- 1986 – Dragoslav Šekularac and Petar Šimleša (assistant coach)

== International players ==
- (Australia) Jim Milisavljevic
- (Australia) Angus Drennen
- (Vietnam) Minh Tri Vo
- (Australia) Billy Rice
- (Australia) Branko Buljevic
- (Australia) Doug Utjesenovic
- (Australia) Peter Ollerton
- (Australia) Jamie Paton
- (Socialist Federal Republic of Yugoslavia) Vlada Stosic
- (Australia) Oscar Crino
- (Australia) Gary van Egmond
- (Australia) Warren Spink
- (Australia) Ernie Tapai
- (Australia) Frank Micic
- (Australia) Josip Picioane
- (Australia) Mehmet Duraković
- (Australia) Vlado Bozinovski
- (Scotland) Brian O'Donnell

== Coaches ==
- (Socialist Federal Republic of Yugoslavia) Ilija Dimoski (1989)
