= St George FC =

Soccer club based in Sydney, New South Wales

- Full name: St George Football Club
- Nicknames: Saints, Budapest
- Founded: 1957 (69 years ago)
- Ground: Barton Park; Banksia, New South Wales
- Coach: Brian Brown
- League: NPL NSW
- 2026: 15th of 16
- Website: stgeorgefc.com.au
Home colours	Away colours

St George FC, nicknamed the Saints or Budapest, is a semi-professional soccer club based in Banksia, New South Wales. Their senior men's team competes in the National Premier Leagues NSW (NPL), in the second tier of the Australian league system. Its senior women's team competes in the Football NSW League One, in the third tier. Both teams play their home games at Barton Park.

Founded in 1957 as Budapest by Hungarian immigrants following the Hungarian Revolution, the club enjoyed initial success in New South Wales' league and cup competitions. After rebranding as St. George-Budapest, the senior men's team became one of the founding members of the National Soccer League (NSL) in 1977, for which the St George Stadium was built as their home ground. The team played fourteen seasons in the NSL, and won a championship in 1983. Following relegation after the 1990–91 season, it has since remained in the state leagues – its current tenure in the NPL came after securing promotion from Football NSW League One in 2023.

== History ==
Chart of yearly table positions for St George-Budapest in NSL

The club was formed shortly after the Hungarian Revolution of 1956 by Hungarian Immigrants and was originally known as Budapest. In the 1960s, led by pioneering soccer administrator Alex Pongrass, it became one of the first ethnic clubs in NSW to search for a district to call home and it chose the St George district. It later became known as St George-Budapest before shortening its name to St George some years later. They opened a licensed club, named Soccer House, in the suburb of Mortdale in 1968. In 1969 Frank Arok, the first full-time coach in Australia was appointed, serving two stints as coach, the last ending in 1983 when he left to coach the Socceroos. In between Arok's two stints as coach, Rale Rasic was coach, coaching the club at the same time as he was coaching the Socceroos. In 1971 the club was invited to an international club tournament in Tokyo, Japan. It won and remained the highest ever international achievement by an Australian club side, until South Melbourne FC won the 1999 Oceania Club Championship. However this was surpassed by Sydney FC (Oceania champions) when they finished 5th at the FIFA World Club Cup where, before them, South Melbourne had finished 8th and Western Sydney Wanderers (Asian champions) 6th.

Such was the dominance of St George in those days that up to 10 players on the national team would be St George players. Five of their players were in the Australian side that started against East Germany in the World Cup that year in West Germany, including the vice-captain of the side, the Australian soccer legend Johnny Warren. Another notable player (albeit at a lower level), was football commentator Les Murray. Together with Warren they would become known as "Mr and Mrs Soccer" and would become the faces of soccer in Australia through their commentary work on SBS Television.

The club's crest during its tenure in the National Soccer League in the 1980s.

In 1975 at the urging of some former Hungarian soccer greats and youth coach Bob Szatmari, the meeting determined to establish the Australian National Soccer League took place at Soccer House with representatives from all founding clubs, including Hakoah Club (later known as Eastern Suburbs and Sydney City) president and Westfield Group founder and chairman Frank Lowy and Leslie Szatmari. The competition started in 1977 and St. George-Budapest won the competition in 1983. They played in the league until the 1990/91 season. Since then they have played in state competitions. In 2005 the side was controversially axed from the new look New South Wales Premier League and took legal action against the decision along with the Bonnyrigg White Eagles, but were unsuccessful.

=== Recent history ===
In 2012 St George competed in the New South Wales Super League, the second tier of state soccer, finishing seventh out of twelve clubs and missing out on the finals. In 2013, St George were promoted from the NPL NSW Men's 2 after taking out the league championship, finishing seven points ahead of the second placed Macarthur Rams FC. The club also won the Grand Final, beating the Rams in the semi-final 2–1 and then beating Mounties Wanderers FC 3–1 in the final. The joy was not to last long, though, as in 2014, the club was immediately relegated back to the second tier of soccer in NSW. Managing just four wins and four draws in 22 games, St George finished last in the top tier. The Saints endured another tough season in 2015, finishing third last in the NPL NSW Men's 2.

In 2017 the club played most senior home fixtures out of Seymour Shaw Park, also playing one game at St George Stadium, Fraser Park and Blacktown Football Park. This didn't seem to deter St George as the side finished in 2nd place, losing the semi-final to Mt Druitt Town Rangers FC 4–2.

Due to the dilapidated state of St George Stadium, the club played senior fixtures out of Rockdale Ilinden Sports Centre in 2018 and 2019. In 2018, St George finished in 2nd place in the league and won the NPL NSW 2 grand final, but were not promoted due to the 'Club Championship' ranking which takes into consideration the performance of the U20 and U18 sides. In 2019, St George finished 10th in the 14-team NPL NSW 2 season.

During the 2019 season, St George reached the FFA Cup round of 32 after beating clubs such as SD Raiders, APIA Leichhardt Tigers and Dulwich Hill, but lost to Sydney United 58 in a 5–3 thriller after two goals from Mushi Kokubo and a stoppage time equaliser.

In 2023, St George FC were promoted back into the NSW National Premier League 2024 by finishing 2nd place in League 1, then defeating Mt Druitt Town Rangers in a play-off series.

After playing its youth and senior fixtures at Ilinden Sports Centre between 2018 and 2024, in 2025 St George returned to their original location after St George Stadium was redeveloped into the Barton Park Sports Complex.

== Honours ==
- National Soccer League
  - Champions: 1983
  - Runner-up: 1982
- NSL Cup
  - Runner-up: 1979
- NSW 1st Division/NPL NSW 1
  - Champions: 1967, 1971, 1974, 1975, 1981
  - Runner-up: 1962, 1964, 1965, 1969, 1970, 1972, 1976
  - Minor Premiers: 1962, 1972, 1976
- Federation Cup & Waratah Cup
  - Winners 1964, 1972
  - Runner-up: 1966, 1974
- NSW 2nd Division/NPL NSW 2/NSW League One
  - Champions: 2013, 2018
  - Minor Premiers: 2013

== Season results ==
Season	League	Place	Cup
1961	NSW 1	7th	
1962	NSW 1	1st	
1963	NSW 1	6th	
1964	NSW 1	2nd	
1965	NSW 1	2nd	
1966	NSW 1	3rd	
1967	NSW 1	2nd	
1968	NSW 1	11	
1969	NSW 1	2nd	
1970	NSW 1	2nd	
1971	NSW 1	2nd	
1972	NSW 1	1st	
1973	NSW 1	3rd	
1974	NSW 1	3rd	
1975	NSW 1	2nd	
1976	NSW 1	1st	
1977	NSL	6th	
1978	NSL	7th	
1979	NSL	11th	2nd
1980	NSL	14th	
1981	NSW 1	2nd	
1982	NSL	2nd	
1983	NSL	1st	
1984	NSL	10th	
1985	NSL	5th	
1986	NSL	3rd	
1987	NSL	3rd	
1988	NSL	8th	
1989	NSL	2nd	3rd
1989–90	NSL	10th	
1990	NSW 1	4th	
1990–91	NSL	10th	
1992	NSW 1	11th	
1993	NSW 1	11th	
1994	NSW 2	10th	
1995	NSW 1	5th	
1996	NSW 1	10th	
1996	NSW 1	3rd	
1997	NSW 1	9th	
1998	NSW 1	12th	
1999	NSW 2	2nd	
2000	NSW 1	4th	
2000–01	NSW 1	6th	
2001–02	NSW 1	10th	
2002–03	NSW 1	9th	
2003–04	NSW 1	2nd	
2004–05	NSW 1	8th	
2005	NSW 1 Champions League	7th	
2006	NSW 2	10th	
2006	NSW 2 Group B	5th	
2007	NSW 2	4th	
2008	NSW 2	6th	
2009	NSW 2	6th	
2010	NSW 2	3rd	
2011	NSW 2	3rd	
2012	NSW 2	7th	
2013	NSW 2	1st	
2014	NPL NSW 1	12th	
2015	NPL NSW 2	10th	
2016	NPL NSW 2	9th	
2017	NPL NSW 2	2nd	
2018	NPL NSW 2	2nd	
2019	NPL NSW 2	10th	
2020	NPL NSW 2	9th	
2021	NPL NSW 2	Cancelled	
2022	NSW League One	9th	
2023	NSW League One	2nd	
2024	NPL NSW	12th	

== First team squad ==
As of 8 April, 2026

Note: Flags indicate national team as defined under FIFA eligibility rules; some limited exceptions apply. Players may hold more than one non-FIFA nationality.

No.	Pos.	Nation	Player
1	GK	AUS	Nicholas Sorras
2	DF	AUS	Rocco Smith
3	DF	AUS	Troy Danaskos
4	DF	AUS	Jayden Seeto
5	DF	AUS	Nicholas Kalogerou
6	MF	AUS	Patrick O'Shea
7	MF	AUS	Justin Poon
8	MF	AUS	Evangelo Souris
9	FW	AUS	Jake Trew
10	MF	AUS	Jaden Casella
11	FW	AUS	Anthony Morabito
13	GK	AUS	Sebastian La Luz
14	MF	JPN	Katsuyoshi Kimishima

No.	Pos.	Nation	Player
15	DF	AUS	Mark Rodic
16	MF	AUS	Kaidyn Wright
17	DF	AUS	Thomas Brown
20	DF	JPN	Kota Toyooka
21	MF	AUS	Harry Keys
22	FW	GRE	Nikolaos Stavropoulos
23	MF	AUS	Javier Rodriguez
24	MF	AUS	Terry Antonis
25	FW	AUS	Harrison Farrow
30	FW	AUS	Trelawney Brown
37	MF	AUS	Jayden Dorevski
40	GK	AUS	Marcus Petrovski
88	MF	SCO	Chris McStay

== Notable players ==
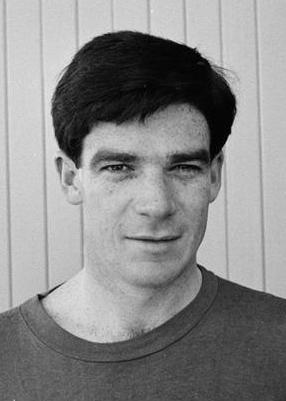
Jonny Warren in 1968

Manfred Schaefer, Johnny Warren and Attila Abonyi were original inductees into the Football Australia Hall of Fame. Later followed Adrian Alston, Doug Utjesenovic, David Ratcliffe, Robbie Slater and George Harris.

- Adrian Alston (b. 1949), 1969 to 1972 with the club. Stalwart of the 1974 Australian World Cup side. Played 37 matches for Australia scoring 6 goals.
- (Argentina) Osvaldo Ardiles (b. 1952), one match for St George in 1985, loaned from Tottenham Hotspur to the club. World Cup winner of 1978.
- Attila Abonyi (1946-2023), 1969 to 1976 with the club. Stalwart of the 1974 Australian World Cup side. Played 61 matches for Australia scoring 25 goals.
- Harry Williams (b. 1951), 1970 to 1977 with the club. First aboriginal playing for Australia. Participant in the 1974 World Cup. Altogether six matches for Australia.
- Chris Cahill (b. 1984), 2006 to 2012 with the club. Brother of Australia's all-time top goal scorer Tim Cahill was born in Sydney but played for Samoa 15 times and scoring 7 goals.
- George Harris (b. 1949), 1968 to 1979 with the club. Played 28 matches for Australia.
- (Socialist Federal Republic of Yugoslavia) Dez Marton (b. 1948), 1982 to 1985 with the club. Top-scorer of the club's golden 1980s era.
- David Ratcliffe (b. 1957), 1982 to 1986 and 1989 with the club. Played 21 matches for Australia scoring 1 goal.
- Manfred Schaefer (1943-2023), 1963 to 1975 with the club. Stalwart of the 1974 Australian World Cup side. The milkman played 49 matches for Australia scoring 1 goal.
- Robbie Slater (b. 1964), 1982 to 1986 with the club. Played 44 matches for Australia scoring 1 goal.
- Johnny Warren MBE OAM (1943-2004), 1963 to 1974 with the club. Part of the 1974 Australian World Cup side. Played 42 matches for Australia scoring 7 goals.
- Doug Utjesenovic (b. 1946), 1971 to 1980 with the club. Stalwart of the 1974 Australian World Cup side. Played 61 matches for Australia scoring 2 goals.

Preceded by Sydney City	NSL Champions; 1983	Succeeded by South Melbourne
