= 1980 Adelaide City FC season =

Adelaide City
1980 season
- Manager: Rale Rasic
- Stadium: Olympic Sports Field; Hindmarsh Stadium
- National Soccer League: 5th
- NSL Cup: Semi-finals
- Top goalscorer: League: John Nyskohus (12); All: John Nyskohus (16)
- Highest home attendance: 8,300 vs. West Adelaide (18 May 1980); National Soccer League
- Lowest home attendance: 1,720 vs. Green Gully (23 July 1980); NSL Cup
- Average home league attendance: 3,991
- Biggest win: 5–0 vs. Enfield Victoria (H) (25 April 1980); NSL Cup; 6–1 vs. St George-Budapest (H) (27 July 1980); National Soccer League
- Biggest defeat: 1–3 vs. Newcastle KB United (A) (27 April 1980); National Soccer League; 1–3 vs. Newcastle KB United (H) (17 August 1980); National Soccer League

The 1980 season was the fourth in the National Soccer League for Adelaide City Football Club. In addition to the domestic league, they also participated in the NSL Cup. Adelaide City finished 5th in their National Soccer League season, and were eliminated in the semi-finals of the NSL Cup.

== Players ==
Note: Flags indicate national team as defined under FIFA eligibility rules; some limited exceptions apply. Players may hold more than one non-FIFA nationality.

No.	Pos.	Nation	Player
1	GK	AUS	Peter Marshall
2	DF	NZL	Glenn Dods
3	DF	AUS	David Jones
4	DF	SCO	Bobby Rusell
5	DF	AUS	Bugsy Nyskohus
6	MF	AUS	John Perin
7	MF	AUS	Agenor Muniz
8	MF	AUS	Brian Northcote
10	FW	AUS	John Nyskohus
11	MF	AUS	Gary Marocchi

No.	Pos.	Nation	Player
12	MF	AUS	Sergio Melta
13	FW	IRL	Vic Smythe
15	FW	AUS	Luciano Signore
16	DF	AUS	John Besir
18	FW	ENG	Colin Barnes
19	FW	ENG	Justin Fashanu
20	GK	SCO	Steve Peressin
—		AUS	Louis Casamiro
—	FW	AUS	Dave Mitchell

== Competitions ==
=== Overall record ===
Competition	First match	Last match	Starting round	Final position	Record							
Competition	First match	Last match	Starting round	Final position	Pld	W	D	L	GF	GA	GD	Win %
National Soccer League	9 March 1980	28 September 1980	Matchday 1	5th	26	13	4	9	40	27	+13	50.00
NSL Cup	25 April 1980	10 September 1980	First round	Semi-finals	4	3	1	0	9	1	+8	75.00
Total					30	16	5	9	49	28	+21	53.33

Source: Competitions

=== National Soccer League ===
==== League table ====
Pos	Team	Pld	W	D	L	GF	GA	GD	Pts	Qualification or relegation
1	Sydney City (C)	26	16	5	5	51	26	+25	37	Qualification to Finals series (Note: The Finals series was not considered the championship for the 1980 National Soccer League.)
2	Heidelberg United	26	15	6	5	55	33	+22	36	Qualification to Finals series
3	South Melbourne	26	15	5	6	42	21	+21	35	Qualification to Finals series
4	Marconi Fairfield	26	14	6	6	53	32	+21	34	Qualification to Finals series
5	Adelaide City	26	13	4	9	40	27	+13	30	
6	Newcastle KB United	26	12	6	8	32	31	+1	30	
7	Brisbane Lions	26	7	11	8	28	32	−4	25	
8	APIA Leichhardt	26	8	7	11	27	35	−8	23	
9	Footscray JUST	26	7	9	10	32	41	−9	23	
10	Canberra City	26	7	7	12	34	33	+1	21	
11	Blacktown City	26	9	3	14	34	55	−21	21	
12	Brisbane City	26	4	10	12	29	36	−7	18	
13	West Adelaide	26	7	3	16	24	46	−22	17	
14	St George-Budapest (R)	26	5	4	17	32	65	−33	14	Relegated to the 1981 NSW State League

Updated to match(es) played on unknown. Source: rsssf.com
Rules for classification: 1) points; 2) goal difference; 3) number of goals scored.
(C) Champions; (R) Relegated

==== Results summary ====
Overall								Home						Away					
Pld	W	D	L	GF	GA	GD	Pts	W	D	L	GF	GA	GD	W	D	L	GF	GA	GD
26	13	4	9	40	27	+13	43	7	3	3	20	10	+10	6	1	6	20	17	+3

Source: worldfootball.net

==== Results by round ====
Round	1	2	3	4	5	6	7	8	9	10	11	12	13	14	15	16	17	18	19	20	21	22	23	24	25	26
Ground	A	H	A	H	H	A	H	A	H	A	H	A	H	A	H	A	H	A	H	A	H	A	H	A	H	A
Result	L	D	L	W	D	W	L	L	W	L	W	L	W	W	W	W	D	W	W	L	L	D	L	W	W	W
Position	11	11	14	8	9	7	8	10	9	9	9	9	9	8	6	5	5	5	5	5	5	5	6	6	6	5
Points	0	1	1	3	4	6	6	6	8	8	10	10	12	14	16	18	19	21	23	23	23	24	24	26	28	30

Source: worldfootball.net
A = Away; H = Home; W = Win; D = Draw; L = Loss

==== Matches ====
Win Draw Loss

9 March 1980 1	APIA Leichhardt	2–1	Adelaide City	Sydney
	O'Connor 14'; Bradley 58'	Report	Muir 81'	Stadium: Lambert Park; Attendance: 1,306; Referee: Dave Nugent

16 March 1980 2	Adelaide City	0–0	Brisbane City	Adelaide
		Report		Stadium: Olympic Sports Field; Attendance: 3,100; Referee: Don Campbell

23 March 1980 3	Canberra City	1–0	Adelaide City	Canberra
	Giampaolo 85'	Report		Stadium: Bruce Stadium; Attendance: 4,080; Referee: Col Amos

30 March 1980 4	Adelaide City	4–1	Footscray JUST	Adelaide
	Deans 21'; J. Nyskohus 52' (pen.), 68'; Northcote 88'	Report	Kondarios 18'	Stadium: Olympic Sports Field; Attendance: 3,300; Referee: Dennis Stanley

6 April 1980 5	Adelaide City	0–0	Brisbane Lions	Adelaide
		Report		Stadium: Hindmarsh Stadium; Attendance: 3,345; Referee: Bobby Kerr

13 April 1980 6	St George-Budapest	1–4	Adelaide City	Sydney
	Cotton 38' (pen.)	Report	J. Nyskohus 13', 46', 87' (pen.); Dods 43'	Stadium: St George Stadium; Attendance: 3,264; Referee: Des Miles

20 April 1980 7	Adelaide City	0–1	Marconi Fairfield	Adelaide
		Report	Russell 21' (o.g.)	Stadium: Olympic Sports Field; Attendance: 4,600; Referee: Barry Harwood

27 April 1980 8	Newcastle KB United	3–1	Adelaide City	Newcastle
14:30 AEST	Marshall 18' (o.g.); Mason 38'; Deakin 65'	Report	Cowburn 85' (o.g.)	Stadium: Newcastle International Sports Centre; Attendance: 5,814; Referee: Dave Nugent

4 May 1980 9	Adelaide City	1–0	Heidelberg United	Adelaide
	Melta 16'	Report		Stadium: Olympic Sports Field; Attendance: 5,315; Referee: Don Campbell

11 May 1980 10	South Melbourne	2–1	Adelaide City	Melbourne
	Xanthopoulos 18'; Buljevic 56'	Report	Rogers 50' (o.g.)	Stadium: Middle Park Soccer Stadium; Attendance: 4,400; Referee: Tony Boskovic

18 May 1980 11	Adelaide City	1–0	West Adelaide	Adelaide
	Barnes 63'	Report		Stadium: Olympic Sports Field; Attendance: 8,300; Referee: Stewart Mellings

25 May 1980 12	Sydney City	2–1	Adelaide City	Sydney
	Trenter 81'; Watson 85'	Report	J. Nyskohus 16'	Stadium: ES Marks Athletics Field; Attendance: 2,390; Referee: Tim Davies

1 June 1980 13	Adelaide City	3–2	Blacktown City	Adelaide
	Barnes 23'; Dods 56'; J. Nyskohus 80' (pen.)	Report	Wilkinson 15'; Pollard 83'	Stadium: Olympic Sports Field; Attendance: 3,100; Referee: Bobby Kerr

8 June 1980 14	Brisbane City	1–2	Adelaide City	Brisbane
	Hamilton 44'	Report	Barnes 50'; Fashanu 65'	Stadium: Perry Park; Attendance: 1,380; Referee: Jim Reeves

15 June 1980 15	Adelaide City	2–0	APIA Leichhardt	Adelaide
	Barnes 14'; Fashanu 57'	Report		Stadium: Olympic Sports Field; Attendance: 3,200; Referee: Ken Allen

22 June 1980 16	Footscray JUST	1–3	Adelaide City	Melbourne
	Vasic 6)'	Report	J. Nyskohus 14' (pen.); Barnes 28'; Fashanu 80'	Stadium: Olympic Park; Attendance: 1,916; Referee: Chris Bambridge

13 July 1980 17	Adelaide City	1–1	Canberra City	Adelaide
	Barnes 27'	Report	Valeri 66'	Stadium: Olympic Sports Field; Attendance: 4,100; Referee: Graham Neal

20 July 1980 18	Brisbane Lions	1–2	Adelaide City	Brisbane
	Hermiston 89' (pen.)	Report	Mitchell 42'; J. Nyskohus 74' (pen.)	Stadium: Lions Stadium; Attendance: 2,500; Referee: Col Amos

27 July 1980 19	Adelaide City	6–1	St George-Budapest	Adelaide
	Mitchell 25', 64'; Jones 36'; Melta 45'; J. Nyskohus 54' (pen.), 70' (pen.)	Report	Campbell 34'	Stadium: Olympic Sports Field; Attendance: 2,400; Referee: Don Campbell

10 August 1980 20	Marconi Fairfield	2–1	Adelaide City	Sydney
	Krncevic 77'; Russell 78' (o.g.)	Report	Jones 29'	Stadium: Marconi Oval; Attendance: 5,800; Referee: Chris Bambridge

17 August 1980 21	Adelaide City	1–3	Newcastle KB United	Adelaide
	Barnes 46'	Report	Jones 31'; Heys 58', 85'	Stadium: Olympic Sports Field; Attendance: 3,100; Referee: Bobby Kerr

30 August 1980 22	Heidelberg United	0–0	Adelaide City	Melbourne
		Report		Stadium: Olympic Park; Attendance: 3,043; Referee: Tony Boskovic

7 September 1980 23	Adelaide City	0–1	South Melbourne	Adelaide
		Report	Cummings 82'	Stadium: Olympic Sports Field; Attendance: 4,923; Referee: Peter Rampley

14 September 1980 24	West Adelaide	0–2	Adelaide City	Adelaide
		Report	Muniz 5'; Barnes 79'	Stadium: Hindmarsh Stadium; Attendance: 5,650; Referee: Chris Bambridge

21 September 1980 25	Adelaide City	1–0	Sydney City	Adelaide
	J. Nyskohus 59'	Report		Stadium: Olympic Sports Field; Attendance: 3,100; Referee: Dennis Stanley

28 September 1980 26	Blacktown City	1–2	Adelaide City	Sydney
	Hunter 16'	Report	Barnes 74'; Northcote 80'	Stadium: Gabbie Stadium; Attendance: 2,248; Referee: Jim Reeves

=== NSL Cup ===
Win Draw Loss

25 April 1980 First round	Adelaide City	5–0	(South Australia) Enfield Victoria	Adelaide
	J. Nyskohus 20', 66', 71' (pen.); Marocchi 51'; Muniz 87'	Report		Stadium: Olympic Sports Field; Attendance: Referee: Bobby Kerr

23 July 1980 Second round	Adelaide City	3–1	(Victoria (state)) Green Gully	Adelaide
	Barnes 19'; J. Nyskohus 45' (pen.); Northcote 68'	Report	Segi 65'	Stadium: Hindmarsh Stadium; Attendance: 1,720; Referee: Stewart Mellings

3 August 1980 Quarter-finals	Spearwood Dalmatinac (Western Australia)	0–1 (a.e.t.)	Adelaide City	Perth
		Report	Melta 100'	Stadium: Dalmatinac Park; Attendance: 2,000; Referee: Barry Harwood

10 September 1980 Semi-finals	Heidelberg United	0–0 (a.e.t.) (3–1 p)	Adelaide City	Melbourne
		Report		Stadium: Olympic Park; Attendance: 3,000; Referee: Tim Davies

== Statistics ==
=== Appearances and goals ===
Includes all competitions. Players with no appearances not included in the list.

No.	Pos.	Nat.	Player	National Soccer League		NSL Cup		Total	
No.	Pos.	Nat.	Player	Apps	Goals	Apps	Goals	Apps	Goals
1	GK	(Australia)	Peter Marshall	26	0	4	0	30	0
2	DF	(New Zealand)	Glenn Dods	21	2	4	0	25	2
3	DF	(Australia)	David Jones	26	2	4	0	30	2
4	DF	(Scotland)	Bobby Russell	23+1	0	2+1	0	27	0
5	DF	(Australia)	Bugsy Nyskohus	26	0	4	0	30	0
6	MF	(Australia)	John Perin	23	0	2+2	0	27	0
7	MF	(Australia)	Agenor Muniz	25	1	4	1	29	2
8	MF	(Australia)	Brian Northcote	10+5	2	3	1	18	3
10	FW	(Australia)	John Nyskohus	26	12	4	4	30	16
11	MF	(Australia)	Gary Marocchi	13+3	0	2+1	1	19	1
12	MF	(Australia)	Sergio Melta	21+3	2	3+1	1	28	3
13	FW	(Republic of Ireland)	Vic Smythe	1+1	0	0	0	2	0
15	FW	(Australia)	Luciano Signore	0+2	0	1	0	3	0
16	DF	(Australia)	John Besir	9+2	0	2	0	13	0
18	FW	(England)	Colin Barnes	16	9	3	1	19	10
19	FW	(England)	Justin Fashanu	5	3	0	0	5	3
20	GK	(Scotland)	Steve Peressin	0	0	0+1	0	1	0
—	—	(Australia)	Louis Casamiro	0	0	0+1	0	1	0
—	FW	(Australia)	Dave Mitchell	7+3	3	2	0	12	3
Player(s) transferred out but featured this season
—	FW	(Scotland)	Dixie Deans	5	1	0	0	5	1
—	FW	(Scotland)	Jim Muir	3+2	1	0	0	5	1

=== Disciplinary record ===
Includes all competitions. The list is sorted by squad number when total cards are equal. Players with no cards not included in the list.

Rank	No.	Pos.	Nat.	Player	National Soccer League			NSL Cup			Total		
Rank	No.	Pos.	Nat.	Player	Yellow card	Second yellow card	Red card	Yellow card	Second yellow card	Red card	Yellow card	Second yellow card	Red card
1	2	DF	(New Zealand)	Glen Dods	6	0	0	1	0	0	7	0	0
2	6	MF	(Australia)	John Perin	4	0	0	0	0	0	4	0	0
3	8	MF	(Australia)	Brian Northcote	3	0	0	0	0	0	3	0	0
3	12	MF	(Australia)	Sergio Melta	3	0	0	0	0	0	3	0	0
5	3	DF	(Australia)	David Jones	2	0	0	0	0	0	2	0	0
5	4	DF	(Scotland)	Bobby Russell	1	0	0	1	0	0	2	0	0
5	7	MF	(Australia)	Agenor Muniz	1	0	0	1	0	0	2	0	0
5	11	MF	(Australia)	Gary Marocchi	2	0	0	0	0	0	2	0	0
9	5	DF	(Australia)	Bugsy Nyskohus	1	0	0	0	0	0	1	0	0
9	18	FW	(England)	Colin Barnes	1	0	0	0	0	0	1	0	0
9	—	FW	(Australia)	Dave Mitchell	1	0	0	0	0	0	1	0	0
Total					25	0	0	3	0	0	28	0	0

=== Clean sheets ===
Includes all competitions. The list is sorted by squad number when total clean sheets are equal. Numbers in parentheses represent games where both goalkeepers participated and both kept a clean sheet; the number in parentheses is awarded to the goalkeeper who was substituted on, whilst a full clean sheet is awarded to the goalkeeper who was on the field at the start of play. Goalkeepers with no clean sheets not included in the list.

Rank	No.	Nat.	Goalkeeper	NSL	NSL Cup	Total
1	1	(Australia)	Peter Marshall	8	0	8
2	20	(Australia)	Steve Peressin	0	0 (1)	0 (1)
Total				8	0 (1)	8 (1)
