= 1979 Adelaide City FC season =

Adelaide City
1979 season
- Manager: Rale Rasic
- Stadium: Olympic Sports Field; Hindmarsh Stadium
- National Soccer League: 5th
- NSL Cup: Winners
- Top goalscorer: League: Dixie Deans (8); All: John Nyskohus (14)
- Highest home attendance: 10,007 vs. West Adelaide (16 September 1979); National Soccer League
- Lowest home attendance: 2,000 vs. South Melbourne (2 September 1979); National Soccer League
- Average home league attendance: 5,207
- Biggest win: 6–0 vs. Brisbane Lions (A) (17 June 1979); National Soccer League
- Biggest defeat: 2–4 vs. Brisbane City (H) (11 March 1979); National Soccer League; 2–4 vs. Marconi Fairfield (H) (8 July 1979); National Soccer League
Home colours

The 1979 season was the third in the National Soccer League for Adelaide City Football Club. In addition to the domestic league, they also participated in the NSL Cup. Adelaide City finished 5th in their National Soccer League season, and won the NSL Cup.

== Players ==
Note: Flags indicate national team as defined under FIFA eligibility rules; some limited exceptions apply. Players may hold more than one non-FIFA nationality.

No.	Pos.	Nation	Player
1	GK	AUS	Peter Marshall
2	DF	SCO	Bobby Rusell
3	MF	AUS	John Perin
4	FW	SCO	Jim Muir
5	DF	AUS	Bugsy Nyskohus
6	MF	AUS	Sergio Melta
7	MF	AUS	Agenor Muniz
8	MF	AUS	Brian Northcote
9	FW	SCO	Dixie Deans

No.	Pos.	Nation	Player
10	FW	AUS	John Nyskohus
11	MF	AUS	Chris Kent
12	DF	NZL	Glen Dods
13	MF	AUS	Gary Marocchi
14		AUS	Robert Marwe
16	DF	AUS	John Besir
17	MF	AUS	Charlie Villani
20	GK	AUS	Rick Migliaccio

== Competitions ==
=== Overall record ===
Competition	First match	Last match	Starting round	Final position	Record							
Competition	First match	Last match	Starting round	Final position	Pld	W	D	L	GF	GA	GD	Win %
National Soccer League	11 March 1979	23 September 1979	Matchday 1	5th	26	13	6	7	43	27	+16	50.00
NSL Cup	25 April 1979	30 September 1979	First round	Winners	5	5	0	0	13	4	+9	100.00
Total					31	18	6	7	56	31	+25	58.06

Source: Competitions

=== National Soccer League ===
==== League table ====
Pos	Team	Pld	W	D	L	GF	GA	GD	Pts	Qualification or relegation
1	Marconi Fairfield (C)	26	15	6	5	58	32	+26	40 (Note: A Bonus Point was awarded for victories of 4 goals or more.)	Qualification to Finals series (Note: The Finals series was not considered the championship for the 1979 National Soccer League.)
2	Heidelberg United	26	14	7	5	44	30	+14	36	Qualification to Finals series
3	Sydney City	26	15	3	8	47	29	+18	34	Qualification to Finals series
4	Brisbane City	26	14	5	7	38	30	+8	34	Qualification to Finals series
5	Adelaide City	26	13	6	7	43	27	+16	33	
6	Newcastle KB United	26	11	9	6	43	30	+13	32	
7	West Adelaide	26	10	4	12	28	31	−3	25	
8	APIA Leichhardt	26	11	3	12	29	37	−8	25	
9	Brisbane Lions	26	8	6	12	28	40	−12	22	
10	Footscray JUST	26	8	3	15	29	43	−14	20	
11	St George-Budapest	26	7	6	13	27	43	−16	20	
12	Canberra City	26	6	8	12	25	41	−16	20	
13	Sydney Olympic (R)	26	7	5	14	23	30	−7	19	Relegated to the 1980 NSW State League
14	South Melbourne	26	6	3	17	26	45	−19	16	

Updated to match(es) played on unknown. Source: rsssf.com
Rules for classification: 1) points; 2) goal difference; 3) number of goals scored.
(C) Champions; (R) Relegated

==== Results summary ====
Overall								Home						Away					
Pld	W	D	L	GF	GA	GD	Pts	W	D	L	GF	GA	GD	W	D	L	GF	GA	GD
26	13	6	7	43	27	+16	45	6	3	4	18	14	+4	7	3	3	25	13	+12

Source: worldfootball.net

==== Results by round ====
Round	1	2	3	4	5	6	7	8	9	10	11	12	13	14	15	16	17	18	19	20	21	22	23	24	25	26
Ground	H	A	H	A	H	A	H	A	H	A	H	A	A	H	A	H	A	A	H	A	H	A	H	A	H	H
Result	L	W	L	D	D	W	W	W	W	L	W	W	W	D	L	L	D	D	D	W	L	L	W	W	W	W
Position	11	9	10	10	10	8	7	5	4	4	3	2	2	2	3	6	6	6	7	5	6	6	6	6	5	5
Points	0	2	2	3	4	6	8	10	12	12	14	16	19	20	20	20	21	22	23	25	25	25	27	29	31	33

Source: worldfootball.net
A = Away; H = Home; W = Win; D = Draw; L = Loss

==== Matches ====
Win Draw Loss

11 March 1979 1	Adelaide City	2–4	Brisbane City	Adelaide
	Deans 8'; Kent 75'	Report	Echeverria 56'; Low 61'; Pimblett 71'; Caldwell 89'	Stadium: Olympic Sports Field; Attendance: 4,236; Referee: Don Campbell

18 March 1979 2	Sydney City	2–3	Adelaide City	Sydney
	Souness 4'; Barnes 45'	Report	Deans 48', 58', 68'	Stadium: Wentworth Park; Attendance: 3,496; Referee: Tim Davies

25 March 1979 3	Adelaide City	0–1	APIA Leichhardt	Adelaide
		Report	Samuels 74'	Stadium: Hindmarsh Stadium; Attendance: 5,176; Referee: Barry Harwood

1 April 1979 4	Marconi Fairfield	4–4	Adelaide City	Sydney
	Krncevic 12'; Byrne 56' (pen.), 78' (pen.); Mariani 90+2'	Report	Deans 38', 42'; J. Nyskohus 44'; Muniz 62'	Stadium: Marconi Oval; Attendance: 3,242; Referee: Peter Rampley

8 April 1979 5	Adelaide City	0–0	Newcastle KB United	Adelaide
		Report		Stadium: Olympic Sports Field; Attendance: 5,100; Referee: Don Campbell

15 April 1979 6	St George-Budapest	0–2	Adelaide City	Sydney
		Report	Northcote 73'; Marocchi 76'	Stadium: St George Stadium; Attendance: 1,968; Referee: Henry Witschge

22 April 1979 7	Adelaide City	1–0	Sydney Olympic	Adelaide
	J. Nyskohus 7'	Report		Stadium: Hindmarsh Stadium; Attendance: 5,100; Referee: Graham Neal

29 April 1979 8	Footscray JUST	0–2	Adelaide City	Melbourne
		Report	Deans 5'; J. Nyskohus 89'	Stadium: Olympic Park; Attendance: 2,146; Referee: Stewart Mellings

6 May 1979 9	Adelaide City	2–0	Heidelberg United	Adelaide
14:30 AEST	Perin 63'; Muniz 82'	Report		Stadium: Olympic Sports Field; Attendance: 4,620; Referee: Don Campbell

13 May 1979 10	South Melbourne	1–0	Adelaide City	Melbourne
15:00 AEST	Baxter 65'	Report		Stadium: Middle Park Soccer Stadium; Attendance: 4,500; Referee: Tony Boskovic

3 June 1979 11	Adelaide City	2–1	Canberra City	Adelaide
	Villani 75'; Northcote 81'	Report	Moulis 48'	Stadium: Olympic Sports Field; Attendance: 5,200; Referee: Graham Neal

10 June 1979 12	West Adelaide	1–2	Adelaide City	Adelaide
	Pillans 9'	Report	Northcote 35'; Marwe 84'	Stadium: Hindmarsh Stadium; Attendance: 11,127; Referee: Tony Beazleigh

17 June 1979 13	Brisbane Lions	0–6	Adelaide City	Brisbane
		Report	Villani 29', 61'; J. Nyskohus 45', 50'; Kent 72'; Dods 79'	Stadium: Perry Park; Attendance: 1,500; Referee: Henry Witschge

24 June 1979 14	Adelaide City	1–1	Sydney City	Adelaide
	Kent 70'	Report	Barnes 51'	Stadium: Olympic Sports Field; Attendance: 8,550; Referee: Nick Karlich

1 July 1979 15	Brisbane City	2–1	Adelaide City	Brisbane
	Campbell 67'; Caldwell 73'	Report	Marwe 43'	Stadium: Perry Park; Attendance: 3,100; Referee: Ken Allen

8 July 1979 16	Adelaide City	2–4	Marconi Fairfield	Adelaide
	Kent 44', 57'	Report	Henderson 38'; Sharne 44'; Krncevic 60', 68'	Stadium: Olympic Sports Field; Attendance: 7,800; Referee: Chris Bambridge

15 July 1979 17	APIA Leichhardt	1–1	Adelaide City	Sydney
	Reed 87'	Report	Deans 56'	Stadium: Wentworth Park; Attendance: 2,968; Referee: Dave Nugent

21 July 1979 18	Newcastle KB United	0–0	Adelaide City	Newcastle
		Report		Stadium: Newcastle International Sports Centre; Attendance: 12,143; Referee: Tony Boskovic

29 July 1979 19	Adelaide City	1–1	St George-Budapest	Adelaide
	Kent 89'	Report	O'Connor 45'	Stadium: Olympic Sports Field; Attendance: 4,200; Referee: Bob Kerr

5 August 1979 20	Sydney Olympic	1–2	Adelaide City	Sydney
	Bell 3' (pen.)	Report	J. Nyskohus 80'; Marwe 83'	Stadium: Pratten Park; Attendance: 3,250; Referee: Tony Beazleigh

19 August 1979 21	Adelaide City	1–2	Footscray JUST	Adelaide
	Northcote 35'	Report	Palinkas 60', 77'	Stadium: Olympic Sports Field; Attendance: 2,500; Referee: Don Campbell

26 August 1979 22	Heidelberg United	1–0	Adelaide City	Melbourne
	Paton 78'	Report		Stadium: Olympic Park; Attendance: 4,000; Referee: Doug Rennie

2 September 1979 23	Adelaide City	3–0	South Melbourne	Adelaide
	Kent 50'; Villani 60'; Perin 82'	Report		Stadium: Hindmarsh Stadium; Attendance: 2,000; Referee: Henry Witschge

8 September 1979 24	Canberra City	0–2	Adelaide City	Canberra
		Report	Villani 10', 63'	Stadium: Bruce Stadium; Attendance: 2,314; Referee: Stewart Mellings

16 September 1979 25	Adelaide City	1–0	West Adelaide	Adelaide
	Northcote 86'	Report		Stadium: Olympic Sports Field; Attendance: 10,007; Referee: Tim Davies

23 September 1979 26	Adelaide City	2–0	Brisbane Lions	Adelaide
	Perin 56'; J. Nyskohus 57'	Report		Stadium: Olympic Sports Field; Attendance: 3,200; Referee: Richard Lorenc

=== NSL Cup ===
Win Draw Loss

25 April 1979 First round	Adelaide City	1–0	West Adelaide	Adelaide
	J. Nyskohus 88' (pen.)	Report		Stadium: Olympic Sports Field; Attendance: 8,123; Referee: Chris Bambridge

20 May 1979 Second round	Adelaide City	3–2 (a.e.t.)	(Victoria (state)) Preston Makedonia	Adelaide
	Muir 7'; J. Nyskohus 46', 100'	Report	McMillan 8'; Cullen 23'	Stadium: Olympic Sports Field; Attendance: 4,500; Referee: Richard Lorenc

4 July 1979 Quarter-finals	Adelaide City	5–0	(South Australia) Eastern Districts Azzurri	Adelaide
	J. Nyskohus 31', 46'; Deans 32'; Marwe 37'; B. Nyskohus 43'	Report		Stadium: Hindmarsh Stadium; Attendance: 3,000; Referee: Tony Beazleigh

12 August 1979 Semi-finals	Adelaide City	1–0	Canberra City	Adelaide
	Northcote 4'	Report		Stadium: Olympic Sports Field; Attendance: 3,100; Referee: Stewart Mellings

30 September 1979 Final	Adelaide City	3–2	St George-Budapest	Adelaide
	J. Nyskohus 54', 76'; B. Nyskohus 65'	Report	O'Connor 21'; J. O'Shea 48'	Stadium: Olympic Sports Field; Attendance: 3,100; Referee: Stewart Mellings

== Statistics ==
=== Appearances and goals ===
Includes all competitions. Players with no appearances not included in the list.

No.	Pos.	Nat.	Player	National Soccer League		NSL Cup		Total	
No.	Pos.	Nat.	Player	Apps	Goals	Apps	Goals	Apps	Goals
1	GK	(Australia)	Peter Marshall	26	0	5	0	31	0
2	DF	(Scotland)	Bobby Russell	20	0	3+1	0	24	0
3	MF	(Australia)	John Perin	25	3	4	0	29	3
4	FW	(Scotland)	Jim Muir	12+1	0	2+1	1	16	1
5	DF	(Australia)	Bugsy Nyskohus	25+1	0	5	2	31	2
6	MF	(Australia)	Sergio Melta	4+4	0	0+2	0	10	0
7	MF	(Australia)	Agenor Muniz	22	2	5	0	27	2
8	MF	(Australia)	Brian Northcote	25	5	4	1	29	6
9	FW	(Scotland)	Dixie Deans	19+3	8	2+1	1	25	9
10	FW	(Australia)	John Nyskohus	26	7	5	7	31	14
11	MF	(Australia)	Chris Kent	25+1	7	5	0	31	7
12	DF	(New Zealand)	Glenn Dods	25+1	1	5	0	31	1
13	MF	(Australia)	Gary Marocchi	6+3	1	1	0	10	1
14	—	(Australia)	Robert Marwe	6+8	3	2	1	16	4
16	DF	(Australia)	John Besir	11+2	0	3	0	16	0
17	MF	(Australia)	Charlie Villani	9+4	6	4	0	17	6
20	GK	(Australia)	Rick Migliaccio	0+1	0	0	0	1	0
—	—	(Australia)	Ron Iasello	0	0	0+1	0	1	0
—	FW	(Australia)	Luciano Signore	0	0	0+1	0	1	0

=== Disciplinary record ===
Includes all competitions. The list is sorted by squad number when total cards are equal. Players with no cards not included in the list.

Rank	No.	Pos.	Nat.	Player	National Soccer League			NSL Cup			Total		
Rank	No.	Pos.	Nat.	Player	Yellow card	Second yellow card	Red card	Yellow card	Second yellow card	Red card	Yellow card	Second yellow card	Red card
1	7	MF	(Australia)	Agenor Muniz	3	0	1	0	0	0	3	0	1
2	3	MF	(Australia)	John Perin	7	0	0	0	0	0	7	0	0
3	8	MF	(Australia)	Brian Northcote	5	0	0	0	0	0	5	0	0
4	9	FW	(Scotland)	Dixie Deans	4	0	0	0	0	0	4	0	0
5	5	DF	(Australia)	Bogdan Nyskohus	2	0	0	0	0	0	2	0	0
5	12	DF	(Australia)	Glenn Dods	2	0	0	0	0	0	2	0	0
5	16	DF	(Australia)	John Besir	2	0	0	0	0	0	2	0	0
8	4	FW	(Scotland)	Jim Muir	1	0	0	0	0	0	1	0	0
8	6	MF	(Australia)	Sergio Melta	1	0	0	0	0	0	1	0	0
8	11	MF	(Australia)	Chris Kent	1	0	0	0	0	0	1	0	0
Total					28	0	1	0	0	0	28	0	1

=== Clean sheets ===
Includes all competitions. The list is sorted by squad number when total clean sheets are equal. Numbers in parentheses represent games where both goalkeepers participated and both kept a clean sheet; the number in parentheses is awarded to the goalkeeper who was substituted on, whilst a full clean sheet is awarded to the goalkeeper who was on the field at the start of play. Goalkeepers with no clean sheets not included in the list.

Rank	No.	Nat.	Goalkeeper	NSL	NSL Cup	Total
1	1	(Australia)	Peter Marshall	10	3	13
Total				10	3	13
