= 1981 Adelaide City FC season =

Adelaide City
1981 season
- Manager: Bob D'Ottavi
- Stadium: Hindmarsh Stadium; Olympic Sports Field
- National Soccer League: 7th
- NSL Cup: Semi-finals
- Top goalscorer: League: Dave Mitchell (9); All: Dave Mitchell (12)
- Highest home attendance: 6,328 vs. Kingsway Olympic (22 March 1981); NSL Cup
- Lowest home attendance: 2,200 vs. Sydney City (15 February 1981); National Soccer League; 2,200 vs. Preston Makedonia (17 May 1981); National Soccer League
- Average home league attendance: 3,198
- Biggest win: 5–1 vs. Blacktown City (A) (12 April 1981); National Soccer League
- Biggest defeat: 0–3 vs. APIA Leichhardt (A) (3 June 1981); National Soccer League; 1–4 vs. Wollongong City (A) (9 August 1981); National Soccer League; 0–3 vs. Preston Makedonia (A) (23 August 1981); National Soccer League

The 1981 season was the fifth in the National Soccer League for Adelaide City Football Club. In addition to the domestic league, they also participated in the NSL Cup. Adelaide City finished 7th in their National Soccer League season, and were eliminated in the semi-finals of the NSL Cup.

== Players ==
Note: Flags indicate national team as defined under FIFA eligibility rules; some limited exceptions apply. Players may hold more than one non-FIFA nationality.

No.	Pos.	Nation	Player
1	GK	AUS	Peter Marshall
2	DF	SCO	Bobby Rusell
3	DF	AUS	Bugsy Nyskohus
4	DF	AUS	John Besir
5	DF	AUS	David Jones
8	MF	AUS	John Perin
9	MF	AUS	Gary Marocchi
10	FW	AUS	John Nyskohus
11	FW	AUS	Dave Mitchell
12	MF	AUS	Brian Northcote
13	MF	AUS	Sergio Melta

No.	Pos.	Nation	Player
14	FW	AUS	Peter Rankin
15	FW	AUS	Greg Buch
16	MF	AUS	Charlie Villani
20	GK	SCO	Steve Peressin
—	DF	NZL	Glenn Dods
—	FW	ENG	Justin Fashanu (on loan from Norwich City)
—	DF	AUS	Chris Manou
—	DF	AUS	Chris Miller
—	GK	AUS	Jack Przybylski
—	FW	AUS	Luciano Signore

== Competitions ==
=== Overall record ===
Competition	First match	Last match	Starting round	Final position	Record							
Competition	First match	Last match	Starting round	Final position	Pld	W	D	L	GF	GA	GD	Win %
National Soccer League	15 February 1981	13 September 1981	Matchday 1	7th	30	13	6	11	46	42	+4	43.33
NSL Cup	8 February 1981	29 July 1981	First round	Semi-finals	4	3	0	1	8	5	+3	75.00
Total					34	16	6	12	54	47	+7	47.06

Source: Competitions

=== National Soccer League ===
==== League table ====
Pos	Team	Pld	W	D	L	GF	GA	GD	Pts	Relegation
1	Sydney City (C)	30	19	5	6	59	30	+29	43	
2	South Melbourne	30	13	13	4	41	27	+14	39	
3	Brisbane City	30	12	11	7	37	25	+12	35	
4	APIA Leichhardt	30	12	11	7	39	33	+6	35	
5	Canberra City	30	13	7	10	41	32	+9	33	
6	Brisbane Lions	30	11	11	8	41	33	+8	33	
7	Adelaide City	30	13	6	11	46	42	+4	32	
8	Heidelberg United	30	12	7	11	48	40	+8	31	
9	Sydney Olympic	30	11	9	10	46	46	0	31	
10	Newcastle KB United	30	11	8	11	41	41	0	30	
11	Wollongong City	30	8	12	10	35	39	−4	28	
12	Preston Makedonia	30	9	7	14	39	41	−2	25	
13	Footscray JUST	30	9	7	14	32	48	−16	25	
14	Marconi Fairfield	30	9	7	14	23	45	−22	25	
15	Blacktown City (R)	30	6	9	15	32	47	−15	21	Relegated to the 1982 NSW State League
16	West Adelaide	30	5	4	21	26	57	−31	14	

Updated to match(es) played on unknown. Source: rsssf.com
Rules for classification: 1) points; 2) goal difference; 3) number of goals scored.
(C) Champions; (R) Relegated

==== Results summary ====
Overall								Home						Away					
Pld	W	D	L	GF	GA	GD	Pts	W	D	L	GF	GA	GD	W	D	L	GF	GA	GD
30	13	6	11	46	42	+4	45	9	2	4	22	13	+9	4	4	7	24	29	−5

Source: worldfootball.net

==== Results by round ====
Round	1	2	3	4	5	6	7	8	9	11	12	13	14	15	10	16	17	18	19	20	21	22	23	24	25	26	27	28	29	30
Ground	H	A	H	A	H	A	H	A	H	H	A	H	A	H	A	H	A	H	A	H	A	H	A	H	A	H	A	H	A	A
Result	L	D	L	L	W	D	W	W	W	L	D	W	W	W	L	W	W	W	W	L	L	D	D	D	L	W	L	W	L	L
Position	12	12	14	15	11	12	10	8	6	8	8	8	8	7	5	5	4	3	1	3	5	4	4	4	5	3	6	5	6	7
Points	0	1	1	1	3	4	6	8	10	10	11	13	15	17	17	19	21	23	25	25	25	26	27	28	28	30	30	32	32	32

Source: worldfootball.net
A = Away; H = Home; W = Win; D = Draw; L = Loss

==== Matches ====
Win Draw Loss

15 February 1981 1	Adelaide City	0–1	Sydney City	Adelaide
		Report	Kosmina 49'	Stadium: Hindmarsh Stadium; Attendance: 2,200; Referee: Bobby Kerr

22 February 1981 2	Canberra City	0–0	Adelaide City	Canberra
16:00 AEDT		Report		Stadium: Bruce Stadium; Attendance: 2,642; Referee: Bob Mee

1 March 1981 3	Adelaide City	0–1	Marconi Fairfield	Adelaide
		Report	Jankovics 63'	Stadium: Hindmarsh Stadium; Attendance: 2,300; Referee: Don Campbell

8 March 1981 4	Sydney Olympic	3–1	Adelaide City	Sydney
	Jennings 69'; Koussas 75'; Laing 89'	Report	Ankudinoff 27' (o.g.)	Stadium: St George Stadium; Attendance: 4,254; Referee: Peter Rampley

15 March 1981 5	Adelaide City	3–1	Heidelberg United	Adelaide
	Villani 8'; B. Nyskohus 78'; J. Nyskohus 89' (pen.)	Report	Cole 11'	Stadium: Hindmarsh Stadium; Attendance: 3,576; Referee: Graham Neal

29 March 1981 6	Footscray JUST	1–1	Adelaide City	Melbourne
	Cozzella 28'	Report	Mitchell 59'	Stadium: Schintler Reserve; Attendance: 2,000; Referee: Evan Venios

5 April 1981 7	Adelaide City	3–2	Brisbane Lions	Adelaide
	Russell 4'; Mitchell 8'; Marocchi 17'	Report	Bryce 13'; Hermiston 77'	Stadium: Olympic Sports Field; Attendance: 3,200; Referee: Jim Rossis

12 April 1981 8	Blacktown City	1–5	Adelaide City	Sydney
	Cuk 24'	Report	Mitchell 4', 76'; J. Nyskohus 30'; Russell 60'; Northcote 66'	Stadium: Gabbie Stadium; Attendance: 2,348; Referee: Doug Rennie

19 April 1981 9	Adelaide City	4–1	Newcastle KB United	Adelaide
	Nyskohus 13', 63' (pen.); Villani 58'; Russell 65'	Report	Kamasz 27'	Stadium: Olympic Sports Field; Attendance: 3,100; Referee: Bobby Kerr

3 May 1981 11	Adelaide City	1–2	Wollongong City	Adelaide
	Mitchell 34'	Report	Fontana 44'; McBreen 72'	Stadium: Olympic Sports Field; Attendance: 3,100; Referee: Stewart Mellings

10 May 1981 12	South Melbourne	0–0	Adelaide City	Melbourne
		Report		Stadium: Middle Park Soccer Stadium; Attendance: 4,000; Referee: Chris Bambridge

17 May 1981 13	Adelaide City	1–0	Preston Makedonia	Adelaide
	J. Nyskohus 26'	Report		Stadium: Olympic Sports Field; Attendance: 2,200; Referee: Graham Neal

24 May 1981 14	West Adelaide	0–3	Adelaide City	Adelaide
		Report	Marocchi 32'; Russell 40'; Northcote 71'	Stadium: Hindmarsh Stadium; Attendance: 6,328; Referee: Jim Fearn

31 May 1981 15	Adelaide City	1–0	Brisbane City	Adelaide
	Mitchell 81'	Report		Stadium: Olympic Sports Field; Attendance: 3,300; Referee: Don Campbell

3 June 1981 10	APIA Leichhardt	3–0	Adelaide City	Sydney
	Soper 65', 90'; Bradley 80'	Report		Stadium: Lambert Park; Attendance: 3,500; Referee: Jim Reeves

7 June 1981 16	Adelaide City	1–0	Canberra City	Adelaide
	Jones 89'	Report		Stadium: Olympic Sports Field; Attendance: 3,289; Referee: Jim Rossis

14 June 1981 17	Marconi Fairfield	1–4	Adelaide City	Sydney
15:00 AEST	Jankovics 50'	Report	Mitchell 1'; Villani 20'; Marocchi 39'; Northcote 45'	Stadium: Marconi Stadium; Attendance: 3,241; Referee: Tim Davies

21 June 1981 18	Adelaide City	3–1	Sydney Olympic	Adelaide
	Melta 20'; Mitchell 36'; Fashanu 62'	Report	K. Wilson 53' (pen.)	Stadium: Olympic Sports Field; Attendance: 3,500; Referee: Graham Neal

28 June 1981 19	Heidelberg United	1–2	Adelaide City	Melbourne
	Cole 51'	Report	Northcote 10'; J. Nyskohus 49' (pen.)	Stadium: Olympic Park; Attendance: 4,000; Referee: Bob Mee

5 July 1981 20	Adelaide City	1–3	Footscray JUST	Adelaide
	J. Nyskohus 59'	Report	Ilioski 15'; Cozzella 82', 84'	Stadium: Olympic Sports Field; Attendance: 3,300; Referee: Don Campbell

12 July 1981 21	Brisbane Lions	2–1	Adelaide City	Brisbane
	Ferris 57'; Williamson 83'	Report	Melta 52'	Stadium: Richlands Stadium; Attendance: 2,500; Referee: Col Amos

19 July 1981 22	Adelaide City	0–0	Blacktown City	Adelaide
		Report		Stadium: Olympic Sports Field; Attendance: 3,700; Referee: Bobby Kerr

26 July 1981 23	Newcastle KB United	2–2	Adelaide City	Newcastle
	Drinkwater 66'; Heys 87'	Report	Fashanu 5'; Melta 21'	Stadium: Newcastle International Sports Centre; Attendance: 4,787; Referee: Dave Nugent

2 August 1981 24	Adelaide City	0–0	APIA Leichhardt	Adelaide
		Report		Stadium: Olympic Sports Field; Attendance: 3,100; Referee: Chris Bambridge

9 August 1981 25	Wollongong City	4–1	Adelaide City	Wollongong
	Bertogna 3'; Fleming 10'; McBreen 44'; Lathan 48'	Report	Northcote 65'	Stadium: Wollongong Showground; Attendance: 3,879; Referee: Tony Boskovic

16 August 1981 26	Adelaide City	2–0	South Melbourne	Adelaide
	Northcote 61'; Perin 80' (pen.)	Report		Stadium: Olympic Sports Field; Attendance: 5,100; Referee: Peter Rampley

23 August 1981 27	Preston Makedonia	3–0	Adelaide City	Melbourne
	Ollerton 15' (pen.); Lucchesi 42'; Brown 73'	Report		Stadium: B.T. Connor Reserve; Attendance: 3,500; Referee: Evan Venios

30 August 1981 28	Adelaide City	2–1	West Adelaide	Adelaide
	J. Nyskohus 14'; Melta 19'	Report	Smythe 50'	Stadium: Olympic Sports Field; Attendance: 3,000; Referee: Stewart Mellings

6 September 1981 29	Brisbane City	3–1	Adelaide City	Brisbane
	Jones 42' (o.g.); Kelso 63'; P. Wilkinson 69'	Report	Jones 26'	Stadium: Spencer Park; Attendance: 2,000; Referee: Jim Fearn

13 September 1981 30	Sydney City	5–3	Adelaide City	Sydney
	Souness 1', 7' (pen.); Barnes 17'; Mullen 50'; Patikas 87'	Report	Melta 4'; Mitchell 6'; Jones 56' (pen.)	Stadium: ES Marks Athletics Field; Attendance: 2,106; Referee: Peter Rampley

=== NSL Cup ===
Win Draw Loss

8 February 1981 First round	Adelaide City	4–2	(South Australia) Adelaide Croatia	Adelaide
	Mitchell 17'; Marocchi 19'; B. Nyskohus 76'; Northcote 80'	Report	Williams 60'; Caggiano 64'	Stadium: Hindmarsh Stadium; Attendance:

22 March 1981 Second round	Adelaide City	3–2	(Western Australia) Kingsway Olympic	Adelaide
	Mitchell 22', 55'; Villani 35'	Report	(unknown) ?', ?'	Stadium: Hindmarsh Stadium; Attendance: 6,328; Referee: Bobby Kerr

17 June 1981 Quarter-finals	Heidelberg United	0–1	Adelaide City	Melbourne
		Report	Fashanu 87'	Stadium: Olympic Park; Attendance: 2,000; Referee: Tony Boskovic

29 July 1981 Semi-finals	West Adelaide	1–0	Adelaide City	Adelaide
	Bozanic 62'	Report		Stadium: Hindmarsh Stadium; Attendance: 6,200; Referee: Barry Harwood

== Statistics ==
=== Appearances and goals ===
Includes all competitions. Players with no appearances not included in the list.

No.	Pos.	Nat.	Player	National Soccer League		NSL Cup		Total	
No.	Pos.	Nat.	Player	Apps	Goals	Apps	Goals	Apps	Goals
1	GK	(Australia)	Peter Marshall	15	0	2	0	17	0
2	DF	(Scotland)	Bobby Russell	30	4	4	0	34	4
3	DF	(Australia)	Bugsy Nyskohus	30	1	4	1	34	2
4	DF	(Australia)	John Besir	1	0	1	0	2	0
5	DF	(Australia)	David Jones	29	3	4	0	33	3
8	MF	(Australia)	John Perin	26	1	2	0	28	1
9	MF	(Australia)	Gary Marocchi	28+1	3	4	1	33	4
10	FW	(Australia)	John Nyskohus	30	8	3	0	33	8
11	FW	(Australia)	Dave Mitchell	25	9	4	3	29	12
12	MF	(Australia)	Brian Northcote	23+2	6	1+2	1	28	7
13	MF	(Australia)	Sergio Melta	26+3	5	2	0	31	5
14	FW	(Australia)	Peter Rankin	0+8	0	1	0	9	0
15	FW	(Australia)	Greg Buch	1+4	0	1	0	6	0
16	MF	(Australia)	Charlie Villani	22+2	3	4	1	28	4
20	GK	(Scotland)	Steve Peressin	2+3	0	2+1	0	8	0
—	DF	(New Zealand)	Glen Dods	9+2	0	1	0	12	0
—	FW	(England)	Justin Fashanu	6	2	1+1	1	8	3
—	DF	(Australia)	Chris Manou	6+2	0	1	0	9	0
—	DF	(Australia)	Chris Miller	3+4	0	1+1	0	9	0
—	GK	(Australia)	Jack Przybylski	13+1	0	0	0	14	0
—	FW	(Australia)	Luciano Signore	5+3	0	1+1	0	10	0

=== Disciplinary record ===
Includes all competitions. The list is sorted by squad number when total cards are equal. Players with no cards not included in the list.

Rank	No.	Pos.	Nat.	Player	National Soccer League			NSL Cup			Total		
Rank	No.	Pos.	Nat.	Player	Yellow card	Second yellow card	Red card	Yellow card	Second yellow card	Red card	Yellow card	Second yellow card	Red card
1	8	MF	(Australia)	John Perin	3	0	2	0	0	0	3	0	2
2	5	DF	(Australia)	David Jones	3	0	1	0	0	0	3	0	1
3	—	FW	(England)	Justin Fashanu	1	0	1	0	0	0	1	0	1
4	12	MF	(Australia)	Brian Northcote	6	0	0	1	0	0	7	0	0
5	16	MF	(Australia)	Charlie Villani	4	0	0	2	0	0	6	0	0
6	13	MF	(Australia)	Sergio Melta	4	0	0	0	0	0	4	0	0
7	10	FW	(Australia)	John Nyskohus	3	0	0	0	0	0	3	0	0
8	3	DF	(Australia)	Bugsy Nyskohus	2	0	0	0	0	0	2	0	0
8	9	MF	(Australia)	Gary Marocchi	2	0	0	0	0	0	2	0	0
10	2	DF	(Scotland)	Bobby Russell	1	0	0	0	0	0	1	0	0
10	11	FW	(Australia)	Dave Mitchell	0	0	0	1	0	0	1	0	0
10	—	DF	(New Zealand)	Glen Dods	1	0	0	0	0	0	1	0	0
Total					30	0	4	4	0	0	34	0	4

=== Clean sheets ===
Includes all competitions. The list is sorted by squad number when total clean sheets are equal. Numbers in parentheses represent games where both goalkeepers participated and both kept a clean sheet; the number in parentheses is awarded to the goalkeeper who was substituted on, whilst a full clean sheet is awarded to the goalkeeper who was on the field at the start of play. Goalkeepers with no clean sheets not included in the list.

Rank	No.	Nat.	Goalkeeper	NSL	NSL Cup	Total
1	1	(Australia)	Peter Marshall	6	1	7
2	—	(Australia)	Jack Przybylski	2	0	2
3	20	(Australia)	Steve Peressin	1	0	1
Total				9	1	10
