= 1978 Adelaide City FC season =

Adelaide City
1978 season
- Manager: Edmund Kreft; Les Scheinflug
- Stadium: Olympic Sports Field; Hindmarsh Stadium
- National Soccer League: 10th
- NSL Cup: Runners-up
- Top goalscorer: League: John Nyskohus (7); All: John Nyskohus (9)
- Highest home attendance: 11,734 vs. West Adelaide (28 May 1978); National Soccer League
- Lowest home attendance: 1,500 vs. Brisbane Lions (19 August 1978); National Soccer League
- Average home league attendance: 5,695
- Biggest win: 5–0 vs. Noarlunga United (H) (24 May 1978); NSL Cup
- Biggest defeat: 0–5 vs. South Melbourne (A) (13 August 1978); National Soccer League

The 1978 season was the second in the National Soccer League for Adelaide City Football Club. In addition to the domestic league, Adelaide City competed in the NSL Cup.

== Players ==
Note: Flags indicate national team as defined under FIFA eligibility rules; some limited exceptions apply. Players may hold more than one non-FIFA nationality.

No.	Pos.	Nation	Player
—	DF	AUS	John Besir
—		AUS	Danny Dance
—	FW	SCO	Dixie Deans
—	MF	SCO	Graham Fyfe
—		AUS	Henry Kolecki
—	FW	AUS	John Kosmina
—		ENG	Frank Lister
—	MF	AUS	Gary Marocchi
—	GK	AUS	Peter Marshall
—		AUS	Robert Marwe
—	MF	YUG	Zoran Matić
—	DF	AUS	Pat McCluskey

No.	Pos.	Nation	Player
—	MF	AUS	Sergio Melta
—	FW	SCO	Jim Muir
—	MF	AUS	Agenor Muniz
—	MF	AUS	Brian Northcote
—	DF	AUS	Bogdan Nyskohus
—	FW	AUS	John Nyskohus
—	MF	AUS	John Perin
—	MF	AUS	Dave Rigby
—	GK	AUS	Roger Romanowicz
—		AUS	Philip Russo
—	DF	AUS	Fred Yung

== Competitions ==
=== Overall record ===
Competition	First match	Last match	Starting round	Final position	Record							
Competition	First match	Last match	Starting round	Final position	Pld	W	D	L	GF	GA	GD	Win %
National Soccer League	5 March 1978	27 August 1978	Matchday 1	10th	26	9	6	11	38	44	−6	34.62
NSL Cup	24 May 1978	8 October 1978	First round	Runners-up	5	4	0	1	11	3	+8	80.00
Total					31	13	6	12	49	47	+2	41.94

Source: Competitions

=== National Soccer League ===
==== League table ====
Pos	Team	Pld	W	D	L	GF	GA	GD	Pts
8	Sydney Olympic	26	9	7	10	35	43	−8	25
9	Western Suburbs	26	9	6	11	41	45	−4	24
10	Adelaide City	26	9	6	11	38	44	−6	24
11	Newcastle KB United	26	6	10	10	33	40	−7	22
12	Footscray JUST	26	7	8	11	29	37	−8	22

Source: rsssf.com
Rules for classification: 1) Points; 2) Goal difference; 3) Goals scored

==== Results summary ====
Overall								Home						Away					
Pld	W	D	L	GF	GA	GD	Pts	W	D	L	GF	GA	GD	W	D	L	GF	GA	GD
26	9	6	11	38	44	−6	33	6	2	5	22	18	+4	3	4	6	16	26	−10

Source: worldfootball.net

==== Results by round ====
Round	1	2	3	4	5	6	7	8	9	10	11	12	13	14	15	16	17	18	19	20	21	22	24	23	25	26
Ground	H	A	A	H	A	H	A	H	H	A	H	A	H	H	A	H	A	H	A	H	A	A	A	H	H	A
Result	L	D	L	W	D	L	W	D	W	L	D	L	L	W	W	W	L	W	L	L	D	W	L	L	W	D
Position	9	11	12	9	10	10	8	10	5	9	7	12	11	9	8	7	7	7	7	8	9	7	10	10	10	10
Points	0	1	1	3	4	4	6	7	9	9	10	10	10	12	14	16	16	18	18	18	19	21	21	21	23	24

Source: worldfootball.net
A = Away; H = Home; W = Win; D = Draw; L = Loss

==== Matches ====
Win Draw Loss

5 March 1978 1	Adelaide City	0–1	Footscray JUST	Adelaide
		Report	Nicolaides 28'	Stadium: Olympic Sports Field; Attendance: 6,500; Referee: Don Campbell

12 March 1978 2	Canberra City	2–2	Adelaide City	Canberra
	Byrne 47'; Grujicic 62'	Report	J. Nyskohus 22'; Melta 36'	Stadium: Bruce Stadium; Attendance: 6,580; Referee: Barry Wilkinson

19 March 1978 3	Brisbane City	2–1	Adelaide City	Brisbane
	Echeverria 48'; Marley 54'	Report	Marocchi 90'	Stadium: Perry Park; Attendance: 5,000; Referee: Dave Nugent

26 March 1978 4	Adelaide City	1–0	St George-Budapest	Adelaide
	Grosse 39' (o.g.)	Report		Stadium: Olympic Sports Field; Attendance: 5,800; Referee: Dennis Stanley

2 April 1978 5	Marconi Fairfield	1–1	Adelaide City	Sydney
	Byrne 44' (pen.)	Report	J. Nyskohus 40'	Stadium: Marconi Oval; Attendance: 6,608; Referee: Peter Rampley

8 April 1978 6	Adelaide City	0–1	Sydney Olympic	Adelaide
		Report	D. Allan 57'	Stadium: Hindmarsh Stadium; Attendance: 5,895; Referee: Bobby Kerr

16 April 1978 7	Eastern Suburbs	1–2	Adelaide City	Sydney
	Campbell 22'	Report	J. Nyskohus 6'; Northcote 67'	Stadium: Wentworth Park; Attendance: 1,283; Referee: Jim Reeves

23 April 1978 8	Adelaide City	1–1	Newcastle KB United	Adelaide
	B. Nyskohus 69'	Report	Galpin 42'	Stadium: Olympic Sports Field; Attendance: 5,123; Referee: Graham Neal

30 April 1978 9	Adelaide City	4–2	Western Suburbs	Adelaide
	Kolecki 3', 75'; J. Nyskohus 40'; Perin 66'	Report	Fisher 62'	Stadium: Olympic Sports Field; Attendance: 5,500; Referee: Don Campbell

7 May 1978 10	Brisbane Lions	3–1	Adelaide City	Brisbane
	Potter 28'; Laszlo 63'; Hermiston 78'	Report	Kolecki 9'	Stadium: Perry Park; Attendance: 3,000; Referee: John van der Lynde

14 May 1978 11	Adelaide City	1–1	South Melbourne	Adelaide
	Muir 60'	Report	Christopoulos 16'	Stadium: Olympic Sports Field; Attendance: 7,856; Referee: Jim Johnston

20 May 1978 12	Fitzroy United	3–0	Adelaide City	Melbourne
	Campbell 47', 50', 68'	Report		Stadium: Middle Park Soccer Stadium; Attendance: 4,000; Referee: Stewart Mellings

28 May 1978 13	Adelaide City	1–2	West Adelaide	Adelaide
	Marocchi 60'	Report	Reynolds 7'; Norris 52'	Stadium: Olympic Sports Field; Attendance: 11,734; Referee: Jim Dixon

4 June 1978 14	Adelaide City	3–1	Canberra City	Adelaide
	Marocchi 1', 72'; Muir 70'	Report	Grujicic 31'	Stadium: Olympic Sports Field; Attendance: 5,301; Referee: Don Campbell

10 June 1978 15	Footscray JUST	0–1	Adelaide City	Melbourne
		Report	Deans 7'	Stadium: Schintler Reserve; Attendance: 1,000

18 June 1978 16	Adelaide City	3–2	Brisbane City	Adelaide
	Deans 32', 41'; Marocchi 40'	Report	B. Nyskohus 66' (o.g.); Lavelle 72'	Stadium: Olympic Sports Field; Attendance: 5,000; Referee: Jack Tarling

25 June 1978 17	St George-Budapest	2–1	Adelaide City	Sydney
	O'Connor 19'; Hensman 79'	Report	Northcote 12'	Stadium: St George Stadium; Attendance: 2,452; Referee: Peter Rampley

2 July 1978 18	Adelaide City	4–0	Marconi Fairfield	Adelaide
	J. Nyskohus 35', 50'; Northcote 65'; Perin 85'	Report		Stadium: Olympic Sports Field; Attendance: 5,000; Referee: David Yelland

9 July 1978 19	Sydney Olympic	2–1	Adelaide City	Sydney
	Pirie 8'; D. Allan 75'	Report	Muir 47'	Stadium: St George Stadium; Attendance: 2,152; Referee: Jim Reeves

16 July 1978 20	Adelaide City	0–1	Eastern Suburbs	Adelaide
		Report	Trenter 28'	Stadium: Olympic Sports Field; Attendance: 5,600; Referee: Chris Bambridge

22 July 1978 21	Newcastle KB United	2–2	Adelaide City	Newcastle
	Drinkwater 14'; Boden 65' (pen.)	Report	Northcote 80'; Deans 85'	Stadium: Newcastle International Sports Centre; Attendance: 7,434; Referee: Tony Boskovic

30 July 1978 22	Western Suburbs	2–3	Adelaide City	Sydney
	SCott 66'; Harding 86' (pen.)	Report	Perin 41' (pen.); J. Nyskohus 58'; Deans 90'	Stadium: Wentworth Park; Attendance: 1,023; Referee: Peter Rampley

13 August 1978 24	South Melbourne	5–0	Adelaide City	Melbourne
	Evans 35', 86'; Baxter 62'; Kalafatidis 78'; Cummings 85'	Report		Stadium: Middle Park Soccer Stadium; Attendance: 5,000; Referee: Nick Karlich

19 August 1978 23	Adelaide City	1–4	Brisbane Lions	Adelaide
	Muniz 76' (pen.)	Report	Laszlo 22'; B. Nyskohus 58' (o.g.); Hughes 62'; Ontong 88'	Stadium: Olympic Sports Field; Attendance: 1,500; Referee: Dennis Stanley

20 August 1978 25	Adelaide City	3–2	Fitzroy United	Adelaide
	Muniz 21', 83'; Perin 58'	Report	Cole 70'; Bannon 89'	Stadium: Olympic Sports Field; Attendance: 3,223; Referee: Don Campbell

27 August 1978 26	West Adelaide	1–1	Adelaide City	Adelaide
	Bozanic 85'	Report	Perin 53'	Stadium: Hindmarsh Stadium; Attendance: 16,251; Referee: Peter Rampley

=== NSL Cup ===
Win Draw Loss

24 May 1978 First round	Adelaide City	5–0	Noarlunga United	Adelaide
	J. Nyskohus 22'; B. Nyskohus 49'; Fyfe 53'; Kosmina 66'; Marocchi 82'	Report		Stadium: Hindmarsh Stadium; Attendance:

19 July 1978 Second round	Adelaide City	1–0	West Adelaide	Adelaide
	Marwe 76'	Report		Stadium: Hindmarsh Stadium; Attendance: 6,856; Referee: Graham Neal

24 September 1978 Quarter-finals	Essendon Croatia	0–1	Adelaide City	Melbourne
		Report	J. Nyskohus 83'	Stadium: Olympic Park; Attendance: 5,000; Referee: Richard Lorenc

1 October 1978 Semi-finals	Adelaide City	3–1	Canberra City	Adelaide
	Marwe 8'; Muniz 52', 89'	Report	Stoddart 4'	Stadium: Olympic Sports Field; Attendance: 2,651; Referee: Tim Davies

8 October 1978 Final	Brisbane City	2–1	Adelaide City	Brisbane
	Kelso 28'; Pimblett 77'	Report	Matić 31'	Stadium: Perry Park; Attendance: 4,900; Referee: Tony Boskovic

== Statistics ==
=== Appearances and goals ===
Includes all competitions. Players with no appearances not included in the list.

No.	Pos.	Nat.	Player	National Soccer League		NSL Cup		Total	
No.	Pos.	Nat.	Player	Apps	Goals	Apps	Goals	Apps	Goals
—	DF	(Australia)	John Besir	18+1	0	5	0	24	0
—	—	(Australia)	Danny Dance	3+1	0	0	0	4	0
—	FW	(Scotland)	Dixie Deans	10+1	5	2+1	0	14	5
—	MF	(Scotland)	Graham Fyfe	3	0	1	1	4	1
—	—	(Australia)	Henry Kolecki	5+3	3	0	0	8	3
—	FW	(Australia)	John Kosmina	4	0	1	1	5	1
—	—	(England)	Frank Lister	26	0	5	0	31	0
—	MF	(Australia)	Gary Marocchi	17+1	5	4	1	22	6
—	GK	(Australia)	Peter Marshall	20+2	0	5	0	27	0
—	—	(Australia)	Robert Marwe	11+5	0	2+2	2	20	2
—	MF	(Socialist Federal Republic of Yugoslavia)	Zoran Matić	11+2	0	2	1	15	1
—	DF	(Australia)	Pat McCluskey	2+1	0	1	0	4	0
—	MF	(Australia)	Sergio Melta	6+2	1	3	0	11	1
—	FW	(Scotland)	Jim Muir	10+1	3	0	0	11	3
—	MF	(Australia)	Agenor Muniz	12+5	3	4	2	21	5
—	MF	(Australia)	Brian Northcote	23+2	4	3+1	0	29	4
—	DF	(Australia)	Bogdan Nyskohus	26	1	5	1	31	2
—	FW	(Australia)	John Nyskohus	24	7	5	2	29	9
—	MF	(Australia)	John Perin	24	5	5	0	29	5
—	MF	(Australia)	Dave Rigby	5+2	0	0	0	7	0
—	GK	(Australia)	Roger Romanowicz	6+1	0	0	0	7	0
—	—	(Australia)	Philip Russo	2	0	0	0	2	0
—	DF	(Australia)	Fred Yung	18+2	0	2	0	22	0

=== Disciplinary record ===
Includes all competitions. The list is sorted by squad number when total cards are equal. Players with no cards not included in the list.

Rank	No.	Pos.	Nat.	Player	National Soccer League			NSL Cup			Total		
Rank	No.	Pos.	Nat.	Player	Yellow card	Second yellow card	Red card	Yellow card	Second yellow card	Red card	Yellow card	Second yellow card	Red card
1	—	FW	(Scotland)	Dixie Deans	0	0	1	0	0	0	0	0	1
2	—	—	(England)	Frank Lister	4	0	0	1	0	0	5	0	0
2	—	MF	(Australia)	John Perin	4	0	0	1	0	0	5	0	0
4	—	DF	(Australia)	John Besir	2	0	0	0	0	0	2	0	0
4	—	MF	(Australia)	Brian Northcote	1	0	0	1	0	0	2	0	0
4	—	DF	(Australia)	Bogdan Nyskohus	2	0	0	0	0	0	2	0	0
7	—	DF	(Australia)	Pat McCluskey	1	0	0	0	0	0	1	0	0
7	—	MF	(Australia)	Sergio Melta	1	0	0	0	0	0	1	0	0
7	—	DF	(Australia)	Agenor Muniz	1	0	0	0	0	0	1	0	0
Total					16	0	1	3	0	0	19	0	1

=== Clean sheets ===
Includes all competitions. The list is sorted by squad number when total clean sheets are equal. Numbers in parentheses represent games where both goalkeepers participated and both kept a clean sheet; the number in parentheses is awarded to the goalkeeper who was substituted on, whilst a full clean sheet is awarded to the goalkeeper who was on the field at the start of play. Goalkeepers with no clean sheets not included in the list.

Rank	No.	Nat.	Goalkeeper	NSL	NSL Cup	Total
1	—	(Australia)	Peter Marshall	2	3	5
2	—	(Australia)	Roger Romanowicz	1	0	1
Total				3	3	6
