= 1983 Adelaide City FC season =

Adelaide City
1983 season
- Head Coach: Bobby Ferguson
- Ground: Olympic Sports Field
- National Soccer League: 11th
- NSL Cup: First round
- Highest home attendance: 2,800 vs. West Adelaide (21 August 1983); National Soccer League
- Lowest home attendance: 950 vs. Newcastle KB United (10 July 1983); National Soccer League
- Average home league attendance: 1,816

The 1983 season was the seventh in the National Soccer League for Adelaide City Football Club. In addition to the domestic league, they also participated in the NSL Cup. Adelaide City finished 11th in their National Soccer League season, and were eliminated in the first round of the NSL Cup.

== Review and events ==
=== Pre-season ===
The following week after the conclusion of the 1982 National Soccer League season, Adelaide City and rivals West Adelaide were in a battle for signings of three South Australian State League First Division players; Azzurri striker Wally Bojczuk, and midfielder Stewart Blair, and Para Hills and Australia under-20 striker Joe Mullen.

== Players ==
Note: Flags indicate national team as defined under FIFA eligibility rules; some limited exceptions apply. Players may hold more than one non-FIFA nationality.

| No. | Pos. | Nation | Player |
|---|---|---|---|
| — | DF | ENG | Neil Banfield |
| — | FW | AUS | Greg Buch |
| — | FW | ENG | Les Carter |
| — | DF | NZL | Glen Dods |
| — | GK | SCO | Bobby Ferguson |
| — | DF | ENG | Neville Flounders |
| — | DF | AUS | Chris Manou |
| — | MF | AUS | Sergio Melta |

| No. | Pos. | Nation | Player |
|---|---|---|---|
| — | GK | NIR | Willie McNally |
| — | MF | AUS | Brian Northcote |
| — | DF | AUS | Bugsy Nyskohus |
| — | FW | AUS | John Nyskohus |
| — | FW | AUS | Peter Rankin |
| — | DF | AUS | Paul Shillabeer |
| — | FW | AUS | Luciano Signore |
| — | FW | AUS | Charlie Villani |

== Competitions ==
=== Overall record ===
| Competition | First match | Last match | Starting round | Final position | Record | | | | | | | |
| Competition | First match | Last match | Starting round | Final position | Pld | W | D | L | GF | GA | GD | Win % |
|---|---|---|---|---|---|---|---|---|---|---|---|---|
| National Soccer League | 13 March 1983 | 9 October 1983 | Matchday 1 | 11th | 30 | 10 | 6 | 14 | 37 | 38 | −1 | 33.33 |
| NSL Cup | 6 March 1983 | | First round | First round | 1 | 0 | 0 | 1 | 0 | 1 | −1 | 0.00 |
| Total | | | | | 31 | 10 | 6 | 15 | 37 | 39 | −2 | 32.26 |

Source: Competitions

=== National Soccer League ===
==== League table ====
| Pos | Team | Pld | W | D | L | GF | GA | GD | Pts |
|---|---|---|---|---|---|---|---|---|---|
| 1 | St George-Budapest (C) | 30 | 15 | 10 | 5 | 47 | 27 | +20 | 55 |
| 2 | Sydney City | 30 | 15 | 9 | 6 | 48 | 30 | +18 | 54 |
| 3 | Preston Makedonia | 30 | 15 | 7 | 8 | 47 | 32 | +15 | 52 |
| 4 | South Melbourne | 30 | 15 | 7 | 8 | 44 | 36 | +8 | 52 |
| 5 | Newcastle KB United | 30 | 14 | 7 | 9 | 45 | 26 | +19 | 49 |
| 6 | Heidelberg United | 30 | 11 | 10 | 9 | 39 | 38 | +1 | 43 |
| 7 | Sydney Olympic | 30 | 12 | 5 | 13 | 38 | 36 | +2 | 41 |
| 8 | APIA Leichhardt | 30 | 11 | 6 | 13 | 43 | 36 | +7 | 39 |
| 9 | Marconi Fairfield | 30 | 9 | 11 | 10 | 43 | 41 | +2 | 38 |
| 10 | Canberra City | 30 | 11 | 5 | 14 | 47 | 53 | −6 | 38 |
| 11 | Adelaide City | 30 | 10 | 6 | 14 | 37 | 38 | −1 | 36 |
| 12 | Footscray JUST | 30 | 9 | 9 | 12 | 25 | 42 | −17 | 36 |
| 13 | West Adelaide | 30 | 7 | 12 | 11 | 25 | 37 | −12 | 33 |
| 14 | Brisbane City | 30 | 8 | 9 | 13 | 33 | 50 | −17 | 33 |
| 15 | Wollongong City | 30 | 4 | 15 | 11 | 41 | 55 | −14 | 27 |
| 16 | Brisbane Lions | 30 | 6 | 8 | 16 | 36 | 61 | −25 | 26 |

Updated to match(es) played on unknown. Source: rsssf.com
Rules for classification: 1) points; 2) goal difference; 3) number of goals scored.
(C) Champions

==== Results summary ====
| Overall | | | | | | | | Home | | | | | | Away | | | | | |
| Pld | W | D | L | GF | GA | GD | Pts | W | D | L | GF | GA | GD | W | D | L | GF | GA | GD |
|---|---|---|---|---|---|---|---|---|---|---|---|---|---|---|---|---|---|---|---|
| 30 | 10 | 6 | 14 | 37 | 38 | −1 | 36 | 7 | 3 | 5 | 21 | 16 | +5 | 3 | 3 | 9 | 16 | 22 | −6 |

Source: worldfootball.net

==== Matches ====
Win Draw Loss

| 13 March 1983 1 | Adelaide City | 2–2 | Canberra Arrows | Adelaide |
| 14:30 ACST (UTC+9:30) | Maxwell 73', 89' | Report | Redmond 34', 78' | Stadium: Hindmarsh Stadium; Attendance: 2,500; Referee: Don Campbell; Assistant referees: J. Miller; R. Hughes |

| 20 March 1983 2 | Brisbane City | 2–0 | Adelaide City | Brisbane |
| 14:00 AEST (UTC+10) | Tokesi 6'; Cairney 43' | Report | | Stadium: Spencer Park; Attendance: 2,400; Referee: Dave Nugent; Assistant referees: K. Andriaanson; B. Norton |

| 27 March 1983 3 | Adelaide City | 2–1 | Brisbane Lions | Adelaide |
| 14:30 ACST (UTC+9:30) | Rankin 28'; Mullen 52' | Report | Wright 75' | Stadium: Olympic Sports Field; Attendance: 2,200; Referee: Jim Rossis; Assistant referees: J. Miller; R. Hughes |

| 2 April 1983 4 | Newcastle KB United | 1–1 | Adelaide City | Newcastle |
| 15:00 AEST (UTC+10) | Mountford 45' | Report | Rankin 12' | Stadium: Newcastle International Sports Centre; Attendance: 2,352; Referee: Ken Small; Assistant referees: M. Tollock; J. Judd |

| 10 April 1983 5 | Adelaide City | 1–0 | Marconi | Adelaide |
| | Mullen 78' | Report | | Stadium: Olympic Sports Field; Attendance: 1,800; Referee: Don Campbell |

| 17 April 1983 6 | APIA Leichhardt | 2–0 | Adelaide City | Sydney |
| | B. Nyskohus 35' (o.g.); Jones 46' | Report | | Stadium: Pratten Park; Attendance: 1,423; Referee: Doug Rennie |

| 24 April 1983 7 | Adelaide City | 1–2 | Sydney Olympic | Adelaide |
| | Mullen 44' | Report | Spyridakos 18'; Soper 40' (pen.) | Stadium: Olympic Sports Field; Attendance: 1,800; Referee: Jim Rossis |

| 1 May 1983 8 | Preston Makedonia | 2–1 | Adelaide City | Melbourne |
| | Ilioski 52'; Odzakov 90+2' | Report | Carter 2' | Stadium: B.T. Connor Reserve; Attendance: 4,000; Referee: Stewart Mellings |

| 15 May 1983 10 | West Adelaide | 1–2 | Adelaide City | Adelaide |
| | Atsalas 63' | Report | Villani 67'; Melta 87' | Stadium: Hindmarsh Stadium; Attendance: 3,825; Referee: Don Campbell |

| 22 May 1983 11 | Heidelberg United | 0–1 | Adelaide City | Melbourne |
| | | Report | Rankin 84' | Stadium: Olympic Village; Attendance: 2,500; Referee: Stewart Mellings |

| 29 May 1983 12 | Adelaide City | 1–0 | St George | Adelaide |
| | Mullen 70' | Report | | Stadium: Olympic Sports Field; Attendance: 2,200; Referee: Mike Browning |

| 5 June 1983 13 | South Melbourne | 2–1 | Adelaide City | Melbourne |
| | Crino 35'; Bozinovski 73' | Report | Melta 41' | Stadium: Middle Park Stadium; Attendance: 3,200; Referee: Jim Fearn |

| 12 June 1983 14 | Adelaide City | 2–2 | Wollongong City | Adelaide |
| | Banfield 11' (pen.); Dods 43' | Report | McBreen 78', 83' | Stadium: Olympic Sports Field; Attendance: 1,965; Referee: Don Campbell |

| 26 June 1983 15 | Sydney City | 1–0 | Adelaide City | Sydney |
| | Watson 90' | Report | | Stadium: ES Marks Athletics Field; Attendance: 900; Referee: Tony Boskovic |

| 3 July 1983 16 | Marconi | 3–2 | Adelaide City | Sydney |
| | Sermanni 15'; Licata 16'; Brown (?) | Report | Melta 30'; Mullen (?) | Stadium: Marconi Stadium; Attendance: 1,746; Referee: Gary Power |

| 10 July 1983 17 | Adelaide City | 0–1 | Newcastle KB United | Adelaide |
| | | Report | Mountford 72' | Stadium: Olympic Sports Field; Attendance: 950; Referee: Jim Rossis |

| 10 July 1983 18 | Brisbane Lions | 0–4 | Adelaide City | Brisbane |
| | | Report | Maxwell 38'; Rankin 61'; Carter 77'; Villani 87' | Stadium: Richlands Stadium; Attendance: 2,500; Referee: Bill Monteverde |

| 24 July 1983 19 | Adelaide City | 1–2 | APIA Leichhardt | Adelaide |
| | B. Nyskohus 74' (pen.) | Report | Bradley 39'; Bertogna 72' | Stadium: Olympic Sports Field; Attendance: 2,205; Referee: Don Campbell |

| 31 July 1983 20 | Sydney Olympic | 1–0 | Adelaide City | Sydney |
| | Soper 72' | Report | | Stadium: Pratten Park; Attendance: 3,364; Referee: Tim Davies |

| 7 August 1983 21 | Adelaide City | 0–1 | Preston Makedonia | Adelaide |
| | | Report | Odzakov 65' | Stadium: Olympic Sports Field; Attendance: 1,000; Referee: Mike Browning |

| 14 August 1983 22 | Footscray JUST | 1–1 | Adelaide City | Melbourne |
| | Paton 18' | Report | Dods 84' | Stadium: Schintler Reserve; Attendance: 1,000; Referee: Chris Bambridge |

| 21 August 1983 23 | Adelaide City | 2–0 | West Adelaide | Adelaide |
| | Mullen 58'; Villani 85' | Report | | Stadium: Olympic Sports Field; Attendance: 2,800; Referee: Don Campbell |

| 28 August 1983 24 | Adelaide City | 1–0 | South Melbourne | Adelaide |
| | Banfield 34' (pen.) | Report | | Stadium: Olympic Sports Field; Attendance: 2,300; Referee: Jim Rossis |

| 4 September 1983 25 | St George | 1–1 | Adelaide City | Sydney |
| | Slater 86' | Report | Carter 83' | Stadium: St George Stadium; Attendance: 5,682; Referee: Doug Rennie |

| 11 September 1983 26 | Adelaide City | 1–1 | Sydney City | Adelaide |
| | Rankin 29' | Report | Kosmina 84' | Stadium: Olympic Sports Field; Attendance: 1,500; Referee: Tony Martell |

| 18 September 1983 27 | Wollongong City | 3–1 | Adelaide City | Wollongong |
| | O'Connor 43', 88'; Cotton 59' | Report | Mullen 75' | Stadium: Wollongong Showground; Attendance: 1,100; Referee: Barry Wilkinson |

| 25 September 1983 28 | Adelaide City | 2–4 | Heidelberg United | Adelaide |
| | Mullen 20'; Villani 26' | Report | MacLeod 30'; Valentine 57'; Campbell 73'; Lea 78' | Stadium: Olympic Sports Field; Attendance: 1,200; Referee: Jim Rossis |

| 2 October 1983 29 | Adelaide City | 2–0 | Brisbane City | Adelaide |
| | Mullen 8', 51' | Report | | Stadium: Olympic Sports Field; Attendance: 1,000; Referee: Don Campbell |

| 9 October 1983 29 | Canberra Arrows | 2–1 | Adelaide City | Canberra |
| | Farina 26'; Gibson 76' (pen.) | Report | Blair 46' | Stadium: Bruce Stadium; Attendance: 1,032; Referee: Glenn Davies |

| 16 October 1983 9 | Adelaide City | 3–0 | Footscray JUST | Adelaide |
| | Blair 3'; Melta 49'; Carter 63' | Report | | Stadium: Olympic Sports Field; Referee: Jim Rossis |

=== NSL Cup ===
Win Draw Loss

| 6 March 1983 First round | West Adelaide | 1–0 | Adelaide City | Adelaide |
| | Wormley 61' | Report | | Stadium: Hindmarsh Stadium; Attendance: 3,169; Referee: Jim Rossis |
