= Adelaide derby =

Soccer competition in South Australia

Adelaide Derby
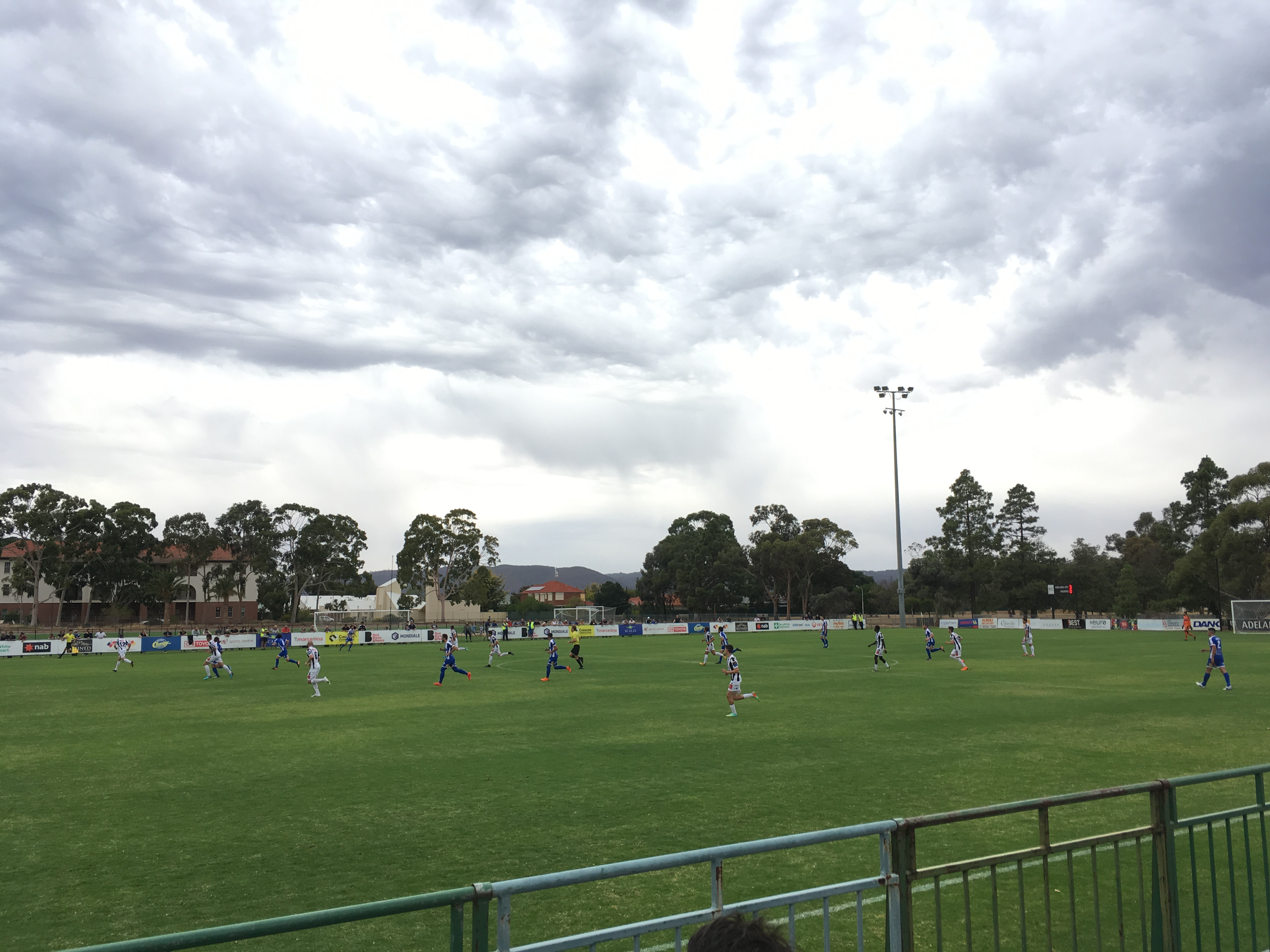
- Adelaide Derby at Adelaide City Park, 2018
- Location: Adelaide, South Australia
- Teams: Adelaide City; West Adelaide
- First meeting: Juventus 5–1 Hellas (14 September 1963)
- Latest meeting: West Adelaide 1–2 Adelaide City (31 May 2026)
- Stadiums: Adelaide City Park; Kilburn Sportsplex

Statistics
- Total meetings: 134
- Most wins: Adelaide City (68)
- All-time record: Adelaide City (68); West Adelaide (45); Drawn (21)
- Largest victory: Adelaide City 6–0 West Adelaide (11 June 2012, 12 August 2017)
- Longest win streak: Adelaide City (6 games) (31 July 1971–2 September 1972) (25 April 1979–24 May 1981) (5 March 2016–24 June 2018)
- Longest unbeaten streak: Adelaide City (9 games) (31 March 1996–16 May 1998); West Adelaide (9 games) (30 April 1966–10 May 1969)
- Current win streak: Adelaide City (4 games)
- Current unbeaten streak: Adelaide City (5 games)

The Adelaide Derby is an intra-city local derby between South Australia's two most historically successful soccer clubs: Adelaide City and West Adelaide. The two sides were the first from the state to compete at the national level when they became founding members of the National Soccer League in 1977. For more than 20 years, it was Adelaide's only intra-city derby. The rivalry was born before the national league developed and when they competed in the state's first division. Adelaide City, then known as Adelaide Juventus was a club backed by Adelaide's Italian community, while West Adelaide Hellas drew its support from the city's Greek population. Since the demise of the NSL, the two clubs have returned to South Australian competition and continue their rivalry in the National Premier Leagues.

== History ==
=== State dominance: A rivalry is born ===
Adelaide City was founded as Juventus in 1946 by a group of Italian migrants, some of whom had previously been members of a club called Savoia. In 1953, the club won its first South Australian first-division title and its first Federation Cup. Juventus had won six league titles and five cups by the early 1960s. West Adelaide Hellas was founded in 1962 by some Greek migrants who had previously been part of the Hellenic Olympic club, banned by the South Australian Soccer Federation for crowd violence. The Greek club merged with the original West Adelaide, which was founded in 1910 and played home games at Hindmarsh Stadium. Like Juventus, it too quickly obtained promotion to the first division, and the clubs established their rivalry.

Juventus and Hellas' first meeting came in September 1963, before the newly formed Hellas had even played its first game in the top tier. West Adelaide reached the final of that year's Federation Cup as it took out the second-tier competition. The final pit Hellas against Juventus, but the dominant Italians proved too good for the upstarts, winning 5–1 in the final. Juventus won the first division that year – their seventh title.

Juventus also won the first league meeting between the two teams, a 2–0 away victory on 18 April 1964. However, later in the year, Hellas was to draw blood against its new rival for the first time. The sides again came face-to-face in the Federation Cup as they had the previous year. The first match ended in a 3–3 deadlock that extra time was unable to resolve, so a replay was contested. Hellas won 2–1 a week later and went on to win its first cup title. However, Juventus again won the league that year.

Again, the two sides came against one another in the 1965 Federation Cup semi-final, with Juventus exacting revenge and going on to win the title. In 1966, West Adelaide won the first division for the first time, taking out wins against Juventus home and away in the process. The first match between the pair that season finished 6–3 to Hellas and remains the highest-scoring derby to date. The following year, Hellas thumped Juventus 4–0 in the league (to date, its biggest derby win) and also demolished the Italian club 3–0 in the Federation Cup final. However, Juventus still managed to win the league, one point ahead of second-placed Hellas.

West Adelaide won the next two league championships before Juventus won the league again in 1970. It also defeated Hellas in the Federation Cup final to claim the double. The two clubs had by now established themselves as South Australia's most powerful. Hellas won the 1971 competition, seven points clear of second-placed Juventus, but the Italian-backed club got revenge in the cup, beating Hellas in the final for the second straight season. Juventus would go on to win four Federation Cup finals in a row, all against West Adelaide.

Between 1966 and 1976, the two clubs won all but one league championship between them. Only Polonia Adelaide managed to break their dominance for a single season, winning the league in 1975.

=== The derby goes national ===
Adelaide City, as the renamed Juventus was known, and West Adelaide became foundation members of the National Soccer League in 1977. On 20 June, the two clubs ran out for the first time against one another in a national competition. In front of 12,328 spectators, Adelaide City trounced West Adelaide 4–1 with goals from Brian Northcote, Agenor Muniz, Dixie Deans and John Nyskohus. Neil McGachey scored the only goal for Hellas. The match did not lack star quality, with Liverpool legend Graeme Souness lining up for West Adelaide. The return game at Olympic Sports Field finished 2–2. West Adelaide won an NSL Cup tie between the two clubs; however, it was 3–2 after extra time. The two clubs were not allowed by the South Australian Soccer Federation to enter teams in the state competition that year, although they both re-entered South Australia's second tier in 1978.

Arguably the biggest derby ever played between the two clubs was contested in the final round of the 1978 National Soccer League season. West Adelaide needed just a draw to win its first NSL title and become the first Adelaide club, and first outside New South Wales, to be crowned Australian champion. Adelaide City couldn't win the league but needed to win the game to deny its rival the title. John Perin scored the opening goal for the Italian-backed club with a long-range strike and City appeared destined to spoil West's party until Vic Bozanić lobbed home an equaliser five minutes from time. A crowd of 16,251 watched the game at Hindmarsh Stadium and it remains the highest recorded attendance of any derby between the two clubs.

West Adelaide wouldn't win another league derby until 1982. The two clubs also met semi-frequently in the NSL Cup, Hellas knocking City out of the 1982 and 1983 editions before the Black and Whites picked up a win in a new group phase format in 1984. Derby crowds dropped in the mid-1980s, and only 3500 spectators watched City defeat West 4–1 at Olympic Sports Field in June 1985, where a young Aurelio Vidmar scored twice in his first derby. The NSL had been split into two conferences from 1984 to 1986, and the two Adelaide clubs competed alongside sides from Victoria and Queensland in the Southern Conference. When the league's administrators chose to return to a single division for the 1987 season, they cut the number of clubs and relegated those which were not retained to their respective state leagues.

The city had won its first league title in 1986 – a 2–1 loss to West Adelaide late in the season notwithstanding. However, West Adelaide had struggled, finishing fourth from bottom in the conference. It was not included in the NSL for 1987 and did not return until the 1989–90 season, the first time the NSL was played in summer. West Adelaide's return to the national league was short-lived. The club finished second-to-last and lost both derbies on its return, although crowds had more than doubled since the mid-1980s. More than 10,000 watched the first derby at Hindmarsh Stadium where City had moved and would play out the rest of its time in the NSL. To make the NSL return more bitter for West, it also lost the 1989–90 NSL Cup Round of 16 game 3–0 to Adelaide City.

=== City soars, West struggles ===
After another year in state league purgatory, West Adelaide returned to the NSL for the 1991–92 season. Again, City was ruthless in front of a 10,000-strong crowd at Hindmarsh, winning 4–1 with two goals apiece from club legend Sergio Melta and a young Carl Veart. Adelaide City would go on to win its second NSL title that season, but West Adelaide was not going to be a pushover in the return fixture. More than 13,000 attended the game on 7 January 1992 and it was a future Socceroo striker Paul Agostino, then just 16 years old, who would get on to the end of a through ball and finish calmly past goalkeeper Robert Zabica to win the game 1-0 for West.

Both Adelaide City and West Adelaide made the finals in 1992–93, and the playoffs would pit the two Adelaide sides against one another at the business end of the season for the first time. It was Hellas that won the first leg of the semi-final, but Adelaide City progressed after winning the second leg 2–1, having finished higher on the table after the minor round. Steve Maxwell scored the brace that ultimately helped City get past their local rivals, although the season ended with a disappointing 1-0 grand final defeat to Marconi.

Adelaide City won another derby in December 1993, a 4-0 demolition. West Adelaide claimed glory two months later, though when Socceroo striker Greg Brown scored a brace in front of a packed Hindmarsh Stadium. His side won 2–0; City again won the championship. The two clubs also played off in a two-legged NSL Cup tie which City won 4–3 on aggregate.

The rest of the 1990s were particularly lean for West Adelaide as their crosstown rivals regularly finished among the top five and played finals football. West won the first derby of the 1994–95 season but the club's supporters did not realise they would only ever win one more NSL game against City again. West knocked City out of the 1994-95 NSL Cup on away goals after two drawn games, despite both matches being played at Hindmarsh Stadium. City won two derbies in each of the 1995–96 and 1996–97 seasons.

In 1998, West Adelaide rebranded itself as the Adelaide Sharks, in an attempt to attract more broad-based support beyond their traditional but dwindling base in Adelaide's Greek community. They ended City's run of derby wins with a 1–1 draw in their first derby under the Sharks moniker. Nathan Day, who would later play for City, scored West's goal. Adelaide City smashed the Sharks 5–0 in the first derby of the 1998–99 season. The result was the most one-sided in all 40 NSL games the two sides contested. There would only ever again be one more such derby in the national league.

Adelaide Sharks defeated City 1-0 thanks to a late Aleksandar Đurić goal on 4 April 1999. The crowd was just 3982 at Hindmarsh Stadium, almost 5000 less than watched the earlier fixture between the two clubs just three and a half months prior and a world removed from the crowds of more than 10,000 fans the derbies had traditionally attracted. Just a week before the 1999–00 season was due to start, the Sharks withdrew from the competition – bankrupt.

City would remain in the NSL until 2003 when it too pulled out of the competition, just weeks before the final edition was about to begin. It was replaced in the NSL by the newly formed Adelaide United, a club backed by the South Australian Soccer Federation and South Australian businessman and former Adelaide City sponsor Gordon Pickard. The April 1999 derby remains the last time two Adelaide clubs faced each other in a national league.

=== The derby is reborn ===
Adelaide City returned its focus to the South Australian Premier League in 2004 upon withdrawing from the NSL. West Adelaide management legally separated its senior and junior arms into two clubs before the Sharks entered administration and ultimately folded in 1999.

West Adelaide's juniors survived through a merger with state league club Adelaide Olympic. In 2008, nine years after the last Adelaide derby was played in the NSL, West Adelaide ended its arrangement with the Olympic and returned to fielding senior teams in the third tier of the South Australian competition. West Adelaide Hellas eventually won promotion back to the South Australian first tier, now called the National Premier Leagues South Australia, for the 2014 season.

West was drawn to host Adelaide City at its temporary home ground at West Beach in round 1 of its first season back in South Australia's top flight. The match was promoted in local media and attracted a crowd of 2900 – significantly higher than the average state league crowd. That match ended 1-1, and West Adelaide won the return leg at Adelaide City Park later in the season. The two clubs reached the final of the 2014 Federation Cup, which served as South Australia's qualifier to the inaugural FFA Cup. Adelaide City won the highly anticipated match 4–1 at Hindmarsh Stadium and went on to defeat Western Sydney Wanderers in the FFA Cup; becoming the first state league side to defeat an A-League club.

West Adelaide won its first championship since its return from bankruptcy the following season despite a 4–0 loss to Adelaide City during the season. West also managed to knock City out of the cup, preventing the Black and Whites from embarking on a second FFA Cup campaign. Adelaide City responded by winning the next five derbies, including a 6-0 demolition in the final round of the 2017 FFSA season – the greatest-ever winning margin in derby history.

Ahead of the first derby of the 2018 season, the clubs announced a perpetual trophy had been created to recognise the historical significance of the derby. Adelaide City defeated West Adelaide 4–0 at home on 17 March to claim the Real Adelaide Derby Cup.

== Results ==
#	Competition	Date	Round	Home team	Score	Away team	Venue	Record
1	1963 Federation Cup	14 September 1963	GF	Adelaide Juventus	5–1	West Adelaide Hellas		1–0–0
2	1964 SASF Division One	25 April 1964	2	West Adelaide Hellas	0–2	Adelaide Juventus		2–0–0
3	1964 SASF Division One	20 June 1964	11	Adelaide Juventus	2–2	West Adelaide Hellas		2–1–0
4	1964 Federation Cup	15 August 1964	RO16	West Adelaide Hellas	2–2 (a.e.t.)	Adelaide Juventus		2–2–0
5	1964 Federation Cup	22 August 1964	RO16	West Adelaide Hellas	2–1	Adelaide Juventus		2–2–1
6	1965 SASF Division One	29 May 1965	7	Adelaide Juventus	2–1	West Adelaide Hellas		3–2–1
7	1965 SASF Division One	31 July 1965	16	West Adelaide Hellas	0–4	Adelaide Juventus		4–2–1
8	1965 Federation Cup	11 September 1965	SF	West Adelaide Hellas	1–3	Adelaide Juventus		5–2–1
9	1966 SASF Division One	30 April 1966	3	West Adelaide Hellas	6–3	Adelaide Juventus		5–2–2
10	1966 SASF Division One	9 July 1966	11	Adelaide Juventus	0–1	West Adelaide Hellas		5–2–3
11	1966 Federation Cup	10 September 1966	QF	West Adelaide Hellas	4–3	Adelaide Juventus		5–2–4
12	1967 SASF Division One	24 April 1967	2	West Adelaide Hellas	4–0	Adelaide Juventus		5–2–5
13	1967 SASF Division One	12 June 1967	9	Adelaide Juventus	0–0	West Adelaide Hellas		5–3–5
14	1967 Federation Cup	23 September 1967	GF	West Adelaide Hellas	3–0	Adelaide Juventus		5–3–6
15	1968 SASF Division One	11 May 1968	3	Adelaide Juventus	2–2	West Adelaide Hellas		5–4–6
16	1968 SASF Division One	27 July 1968	13	West Adelaide Hellas	2–0	Adelaide Juventus		5–4–7
17	1969 SASF Division One	10 May 1969	6	West Adelaide Hellas	1–1	Adelaide Juventus		5–5–7
18	1969 SASF Division One	26 July 1969	16	Adelaide Juventus	2–1	West Adelaide Hellas		6–5–7
19	1970 SASF Division One	30 May 1970	7	West Adelaide Hellas	2–2	Adelaide Juventus		6–6–7
20	1970 SASF Division One		17	Adelaide Juventus	3–4	West Adelaide Hellas		6–6–8
21	1970 Federation Cup		GF	Adelaide Juventus	3–2	West Adelaide Hellas		7–6–8
22	1970 Coca-Cola Challenge Cup	12 October 1970	3	Adelaide Juventus	def. by	West Adelaide Hellas		7–6–9
23	1971 SASF Division One	15 May 1971	4	Adelaide Juventus	0–2	West Adelaide Hellas		7–6–10
24	1971 SASF Division One	31 July 1971	13	West Adelaide Hellas	3–5	Adelaide Juventus		8–6–10
25	1971 Federation Cup	18 September 1971	GF	Adelaide Juventus	1–0	West Adelaide Hellas		9–6–10
26	1971 Coca-Cola Challenge Cup	25 September 1971	SF	Adelaide Juventus	1–0	West Adelaide Hellas		10–6–10
27	1972 SASF Division One	22 April 1972	2	West Adelaide Hellas	0–2	Adelaide Juventus		11–6–10
28	1972 SASF Division One	24 June 1972	10	Adelaide Juventus	3–1	West Adelaide Hellas		12–6–10
29	1972 Federation Cup	2 September 1972	GF	Adelaide Juventus	2–0	West Adelaide Hellas		13–6–10
30	1973 SASF Division One	19 May 1973	6	Adelaide Juventus	0–1	West Adelaide Hellas	Olympic Sports Field	13–6–11
31	1973 SASF Division One	28 July 1973	15	West Adelaide Hellas	4–1	Adelaide Juventus	Hindmarsh Stadium	13–6–12
32	1973 Federation Cup	1 September 1973	GF	West Adelaide Hellas	0–1	Adelaide Juventus		14–6–12
33	1973 Coca-Cola Challenge Cup	22 September 1973	GF	Adelaide Juventus	1–0	West Adelaide Hellas		15–6–12
34	1974 SASF Division One	25 May 1974	6	West Adelaide Hellas	1–0	Adelaide Juventus	Hindmarsh Stadium	15–6–13
35	1974 SASF Division One	3 August 1974	15	Adelaide Juventus	1–0	West Adelaide Hellas	Olympic Sports Field	16–6–13
36	1975 SASF Division One	24 May 1975	6	West Adelaide Hellas	2–2	Adelaide Juventus	Hindmarsh Stadium	16–7–13
37	1975 SASF Division One	2 August 1975	15	Adelaide Juventus	0–1	West Adelaide Hellas	Olympic Sports Field	16–7–14
38	1975 Coca-Cola Challenge Cup	27 September 1975	SF	West Adelaide Hellas	3–2	Adelaide Juventus		16–7–15
39	1976 SASF Division One	12 June 1976	8	West Adelaide Hellas	3–2	Adelaide Juventus	Hindmarsh Stadium	17–7–15
40	1976 SASF Division One	28 August 1976	17	Adelaide Juventus	1–1	West Adelaide Hellas	Olympic Sports Field	17–8–15
41	1976 Coca-Cola Challenge Cup	9 October 1976	GF	West Adelaide Hellas	2–1	Adelaide Juventus		17–8–16
42	1977 National Soccer League	20 June 1977	12	West Adelaide Hellas	1–4	Adelaide City	Hindmarsh Stadium	18–8–16
43	1977 National Soccer League	19 September 1977	25	Adelaide City	2–2	West Adelaide Hellas	Olympic Sports Field	18–9–16
44	1977 NSL Cup	20 September 1977	1	West Adelaide Hellas	2–2 (a.e.t.); 4–2 (pen.)	Adelaide City	Hindmarsh Stadium	18–9–17
45	1978 National Soccer League	28 May 1978	13	Adelaide City	1–2	West Adelaide Hellas	Olympic Sports Field	18–9–18
46	1978 NSL Cup	19 July 1978	RO16	Adelaide City	1–0	West Adelaide Hellas	Hindmarsh Stadium	19–9–18
47	1978 National Soccer League	27 August 1978	26	West Adelaide Hellas	1–1	Adelaide City	Hindmarsh Stadium	19–10–18
48	1979 NSL Cup	25 April 1979	RO32	Adelaide City	1–0	West Adelaide Hellas	Hindmarsh Stadium	20–10–18
49	1979 National Soccer League	10 June 1979	12	West Adelaide Hellas	1–2	Adelaide City	Hindmarsh Stadium	21–10–18
50	1979 National Soccer League	16 September 1979	25	Adelaide City	1–0	West Adelaide Hellas	Olympic Sports Field	22–10–18
51	1980 National Soccer League	18 May 1980	11	Adelaide City	1–0	West Adelaide Hellas	Olympic Sports Field	23–10–18
52	1980 National Soccer League	14 September 1980	24	West Adelaide Hellas	0–2	Adelaide City	Hindmarsh Stadium	24–10–18
53	1981 National Soccer League	24 May 1981	14	West Adelaide Hellas	0–3	Adelaide City	Hindmarsh Stadium	25–10–18
54	1981 NSL Cup	29 July 1981	SF	West Adelaide Hellas	1–0	Adelaide City	Hindmarsh Stadium	25–10–19
55	1981 National Soccer League	30 August 1981	28	Adelaide City	2–1	West Adelaide Hellas	Olympic Sports Field	26–10–19
56	1982 National Soccer League	16 May 1982	14	West Adelaide Hellas	2–1	Adelaide City	Hindmarsh Stadium	26–10–20
57	1982 NSL Cup	14 June 1982	RO32	West Adelaide Hellas	3–1	Adelaide City	Hindmarsh Stadium	26–10–21
58	1982 National Soccer League	22 August 1982	28	Adelaide City	0–0	West Adelaide Hellas	Olympic Sports Field	26–11–21
59	1983 NSL Cup	6 March 1983	RO16	West Adelaide Hellas	1–0	Adelaide City	Hindmarsh Stadium	26–11–22
60	1983 National Soccer League	15 May 1983	10	West Adelaide Hellas	1–2	Adelaide City	Hindmarsh Stadium	27–11–22
61	1983 National Soccer League	21 August 1983	23	Adelaide City	2–0	West Adelaide Hellas	Olympic Sports Field	28–11–22
62	1984 National Soccer League	4 March 1984	1	West Adelaide Hellas	0–1	Adelaide City	Hindmarsh Stadium	29–11–22
63	1984 NSL Cup	23 May 1984	1	West Adelaide Hellas	0–1	Adelaide City	Hindmarsh Stadium	30–11–22
64	1984 National Soccer League	8 April 1984	6	West Adelaide Hellas	2–1	Adelaide City	Hindmarsh Stadium	30–11–23
65	1984 National Soccer League	1 July 1984	14	Adelaide City	1–0	West Adelaide Hellas	Olympic Sports Field	31–11–23
66	1984 National Soccer League	12 August 1984	20	Adelaide City	3–2	West Adelaide Hellas	Olympic Sports Field	32–11–23
67	1984 National Soccer League	30 September 1984	27	West Adelaide Hellas	0–3	Adelaide City	Hindmarsh Stadium	33–11–23
68	1985 National Soccer League	24 March 1985	3	West Adelaide Hellas	2–1	Adelaide City	Hindmarsh Stadium	33–11–24
69	1985 National Soccer League	9 June 1985	14	Adelaide City	4–1	West Adelaide Hellas	Olympic Sports Field	34–11–24
70	1986 NSL Cup	27 April 1986	RO16	West Adelaide Hellas	1–0	Adelaide City	Hindmarsh Stadium	34–11–25
71	1986 National Soccer League	8 June 1986	9	Adelaide City	3–1	West Adelaide Hellas	Hindmarsh Stadium	35–11–25
72	1986 National Soccer League	24 August 1986	19	West Adelaide Hellas	2–1	Adelaide City	Hindmarsh Stadium	35–11–26
73	1988 SASF Division One	21 May 1988	10	Adelaide City	0–1	West Adelaide Hellas	Olympic Sports Field	35–11–27
74	1988 SASF Division One	20 August 1988	21	West Adelaide Hellas	2–0	Adelaide City	Hindmarsh Stadium	35–11–28
75	1989 SASF Division One	22 April 1989	6	Adelaide City	0–5	West Adelaide Hellas	Olympic Sports Field	35–11–29
76	1989 SASF Division One	8 July 1989	17	West Adelaide Hellas	1–0	Adelaide City	Hindmarsh Stadium	35–11–30
77	1989–90 NSL Cup	14 February 1990	1	Adelaide City	3–0	West Adelaide Hellas	Hindmarsh Stadium	36–11–30
78	1990 SASF Division One	14 April 1990	7	Adelaide City	1–1	West Adelaide Hellas	Hindmarsh Stadium	36–12–30
79	1990 SASF Division One	30 June 1990	18	West Adelaide Hellas	2–1	Adelaide City	Hindmarsh Stadium	36–12–31
80	1991 SASF Division One	4 May 1991	7	West Adelaide Hellas	0–1	Adelaide City	Hindmarsh Stadium	37–12–31
81	1991 SASF Division One	27 July 1991	18	Adelaide City	0–2	West Adelaide Hellas	Hindmarsh Stadium	37–12–32
82	1991–92 National Soccer League	7 October 1991	4	West Adelaide Hellas	1–4	Adelaide City	Hindmarsh Stadium	38–12–32
83	1991–92 NSL Cup	30 October 1991	1	Adelaide City	1–0	West Adelaide Hellas	Hindmarsh Stadium	39–12–32
84	1991–92 National Soccer League	7 January 1992	17	Adelaide City	0–1	West Adelaide Hellas	Hindmarsh Stadium	39–12–33
85	1992–93 National Soccer League	7 November 1992	6	West Adelaide Hellas	0–1	Adelaide City	Hindmarsh Stadium	40–12–33
86	1992–93 NSL Cup	18 November 1992	1	Adelaide City	3–2	West Adelaide Hellas	Hindmarsh Stadium	41–12–33
87	1992–93 NSL Cup	9 December 1992	1	West Adelaide Hellas	1–2	Adelaide City	Hindmarsh Stadium	42–12–33
88	1992–93 National Soccer League	1 February 1993	19	Adelaide City	1–0	West Adelaide Hellas	Hindmarsh Stadium	43–12–33
89	1992–93 National Soccer League		EF	West Adelaide Hellas	1–0	Adelaide City	Hindmarsh Stadium	43–12–34
90	1992–93 National Soccer League		EF	Adelaide City	2–1	West Adelaide Hellas	Hindmarsh Stadium	44–12–34
91	1993–94 NSL Cup	3 October 1993	1	West Adelaide Hellas	0–1	Adelaide City	Hindmarsh Stadium	45–12–34
92	1993–94 NSL Cup	6 October 1993	1	Adelaide City	3–3	West Adelaide Hellas	Hindmarsh Stadium	45–13–34
93	1993–94 National Soccer League	3 December 1993	6	Adelaide City	4–0	West Adelaide Hellas	Hindmarsh Stadium	46–13–34
94	1993–94 National Soccer League	7 February 1994	19	West Adelaide Hellas	2–0	Adelaide City	Hindmarsh Stadium	46–13–35
95	1994–95 NSL Cup	30 September 1994	1	Adelaide City	2–2	West Adelaide Hellas	Hindmarsh Stadium	46–14–35
96	1994–95 NSL Cup	3 October 1994	1	West Adelaide Hellas	0–0	Adelaide City	Hindmarsh Stadium	46–15–35
97	1994–95 National Soccer League	23 December 1994	13	West Adelaide Hellas	2–1	Adelaide City	Hindmarsh Stadium	46–15–36
98	1994–95 National Soccer League	9 April 1995	26	Adelaide City	2–1	West Adelaide Hellas	Hindmarsh Stadium	47–15–36
99	1995 SASF Division Two	27 May 1995	10	West Adelaide Hellas	2–2	Adelaide City		47–16–36
100	1995 SASF Division Two	5 August 1995	21	Adelaide City	1–2	West Adelaide Hellas		47–16–37
101	1995–96 National Soccer League	5 November 1995	6	West Adelaide Hellas	1–2	Adelaide City	Hindmarsh Stadium	48–16–37
102	1995–96 National Soccer League	7 January 1996	17	Adelaide City	0–2	West Adelaide Hellas	Hindmarsh Stadium	48–16–38
103	1996 SASF Division Two	16 March 1996	3	Adelaide City	1–3	West Adelaide Hellas		48–16–39
104	1995–96 National Soccer League	31 March 1996	28	West Adelaide Hellas	0–3	Adelaide City	Hindmarsh Stadium	49–16–39
105	1996 SASF Division Two	22 June 1996	14	West Adelaide Hellas	0–2	Adelaide City		50–16–39
106	1996–97 National Soccer League	24 November 1996	7	Adelaide City	1–0	West Adelaide Hellas	Hindmarsh Stadium	51–16–39
107	1996–97 National Soccer League	16 March 1997	21	West Adelaide Hellas	0–2	Adelaide City	Hindmarsh Stadium	52–16–39
108	1997 SASF Division Two	31 May 1997	10	Adelaide City	1–0	West Adelaide Hellas		53–16–39
109	1997 SASF Division Two	16 August 1997	21	West Adelaide Hellas	1–1	Adelaide City		53–17–39
110	1997–98 National Soccer League	14 January 1998	11	West Adelaide Hellas	1–1	Adelaide City	Hindmarsh Stadium	53–18–39
111	1997–98 National Soccer League	5 April 1998	25	Adelaide City	3–1	West Adelaide Hellas	Hindmarsh Stadium	54–18–39
112	1998 SASF Division Two	16 May 1998	9	West Adelaide Sharks	1–1	Adelaide City		54–19–39
113	1998 SASF Division Two	1 August 1998	20	Adelaide City	0–1	West Adelaide Sharks		54–19–40
114	1999 SASF Division Two	17 May 1999	12	Adelaide City	5–2	West Adelaide Sharks		55–19–40
115	1999 SASF Division Two	7 August 1999	25	West Adelaide Sharks	2–1	Adelaide City		55–19–41
116	2012 Federation Cup	11 June 2012	RO16	Adelaide City	6–0	West Adelaide	Adelaide City Park	56–19–41
117	2014 National Premier Leagues South Australia	21 February 2014	1	West Adelaide	1–1	Adelaide City	Adelaide Shores Football Centre	56–20–41
118	2014 National Premier Leagues South Australia	24 May 2014	14	Adelaide City	1–2	West Adelaide	Adelaide City Park	56–20–42
119	2014 Federation Cup	31 May 2014	GF	Adelaide City	4–1	West Adelaide	Hindmarsh Stadium	57–20–42
120	2015 National Premier Leagues South Australia	6 March 2015	4	West Adelaide	3–2	Adelaide City	Adelaide Shores Football Centre	57–20–43
121	2015 Federation Cup	25 April 2015	RO16	Adelaide City	4–0	West Adelaide	Adelaide City Park	58–20–43
122	2015 National Premier Leagues South Australia	8 June 2015	17	Adelaide City	2–3	West Adelaide	Adelaide City Park	58–20–44
123	2016 National Premier Leagues South Australia	5 March 2016	2	Adelaide City	1–0	West Adelaide	Adelaide City Park	59–20–44
124	2016 National Premier Leagues South Australia	5 June 2016	13	West Adelaide	1–2	Adelaide City	Adelaide Shores Football Centre	60–20–44
125	2017 National Premier Leagues South Australia	20 May 2017	11	West Adelaide	1–2	Adelaide City	Adelaide Shores Football Centre	61–20–44
126	2017 National Premier Leagues South Australia	12 August 2017	22	Adelaide City	6–0	West Adelaide	Adelaide City Park	62–20–44
127	2018 National Premier Leagues South Australia	17 March 2018	5	Adelaide City	4–0	West Adelaide	Adelaide City Park	63–20–44
128	2018 National Premier Leagues South Australia	24 June 2018	16	West Adelaide	1–3	Adelaide City	Adelaide Shores Football Centre	64–20–44
129	2019 National Premier Leagues South Australia	13 April 2019	7	West Adelaide	3–0	Adelaide City	The Parks Football Centre	64–20–45
130	2019 National Premier Leagues South Australia	7 June 2019	13	Adelaide City	0–0	West Adelaide	Adelaide City Park	64–21–45
131	2023 National Premier Leagues South Australia	17 February 2023	1	Adelaide City	4–0	West Adelaide	State Centre for Football	65–21–45
132	2023 National Premier Leagues South Australia	13 May 2023	12	West Adelaide	0–1	Adelaide City	West Beach Parks Football Centre	66–21–45
133	2026 National Premier Leagues South Australia	28 February 2026	1	Adelaide City	2–1	West Adelaide	Adelaide City Park	67–21–45
134	2026 National Premier Leagues South Australia	31 May 2026	12	West Adelaide	1–2	Adelaide City	Kilburn Sportsplex	68–21–45

== Records and statistics ==
	Matches	Adelaide City Wins	Draws	West Adelaide Wins	Adelaide City Goals	West Adelaide Goals
South Australian Competitions	60	23	13	24	95	85
National Soccer League	38	25	4	9	67	33
Cups/Playoffs	36	20	4	12	61	40
Total	134	68	21	45	223	158
