= Colin Barnes =

English former professional footballer

Personal information
- Date of birth: 28 May 1957 (age 69)
- Place of birth: Luton, Bedfordshire, England
- Position: Forward

Youth career
- Crystal Palace

Senior career*
Years	Team	Apps	(Gls)
–	Luton Town		
–	Dunstable Town		
–	Hitchin Town		
1980	Adelaide City	16	(9)
19??–1983	Barnet		
1983–1984	Torquay United	43	(11)
1984–1985	Yeovil Town		(6)
- * Club domestic league appearances and goals

Colin Barnes (born 28 May 1957) is an English former professional footballer born in Notting Hill, London, who played as a forward in the Football League for Torquay United.

Barnes began his career with Crystal Palace, but failed to make the grade at Selhurst Park and moved to Luton Town. He left Luton without making his first team debut and joined non-league Dunstable Town. He later played for Hitchin Town, Adelaide City and Barnet, where he was top scorer and Player of the Year in the 1982–83 season, and from where he was signed by Torquay United in August 1983. His league debut came on 28 September 1983, Barnes scoring against Chester City in a Fourth Division match at Sealand Road. Although a regular in the side, in 1984 he was allowed to leave for non-league Yeovil Town. He had played 43 league games for Torquay, scoring 11 times.
