= David Jones (soccer, born 1955) =

Australian soccer player and coach

Personal information
- Date of birth: 1 April 1955 (age 71)
- Place of birth: Fremantle, Australia
- Position: Defender

Youth career
- Kwinana

Senior career*
Years	Team	Apps	(Gls)
1970–1975	Kwinana		
1976	East Fremantle Tricolore		
1977–1979	West Adelaide	76	(6)
1980–1981	Adelaide City	55	(5)
1982	South Melbourne	10	(0)
1982–1983	Preston Makedonia	44	(0)
1984	Perth Azzurri	21	(0)
Total		206	(11)

International career
1977–1978	Australia	5	(0)

Managerial career
- 1994: Croydon City
- * Club domestic league appearances and goals

David Jones (born 1 April 1955) is an Australian former soccer player and coach.

== Club career ==
Jones was born in Fremantle, Western Australia. A defender, he played his junior soccer for Kwinana United before graduating to the senior team in 1970. He remained with the club until the end of the 1975 season, when he won the Rothmans Gold Medal award for the season's fairest and best player. In 1976 Jones played for East Fremantle Tricolore. In the first year of the National Soccer League in 1977 he played for West Adelaide and was part of the club's championship winning team the following year. In all, he played five seasons in South Australia including two with Adelaide City. He later had a brief playing stint with South Melbourne before joining Preston Makedonia. He moved back to Western Australia in 1985, playing with Perth Azzurri.

== State career ==
Jones represented Western Australia 24 times, winning two Marah Halim Cup championships.

== International career ==
In 1975 Jones made his debut for Australia against Singapore in Singapore. He played a total of five full international matches for the Socceroos, the last being a match against Greece in Adelaide in July 1978.

== Coaching career ==
In 1994 Jones was head coach at Croydon City in the Victorian State League.

== Honours ==
East Fremantle Tricolore

- D'Orsogna Cup: 1976

Western Australia

- Marah Halim Cup Winner: 1975, 1976

Individual

- Gold Medal (Best and Fairest player in WA State League): 1975
- Football Hall of Fame Western Australia inductee: 1996
