= Adelaide City Park =

Stadium in Oakden, South Australia

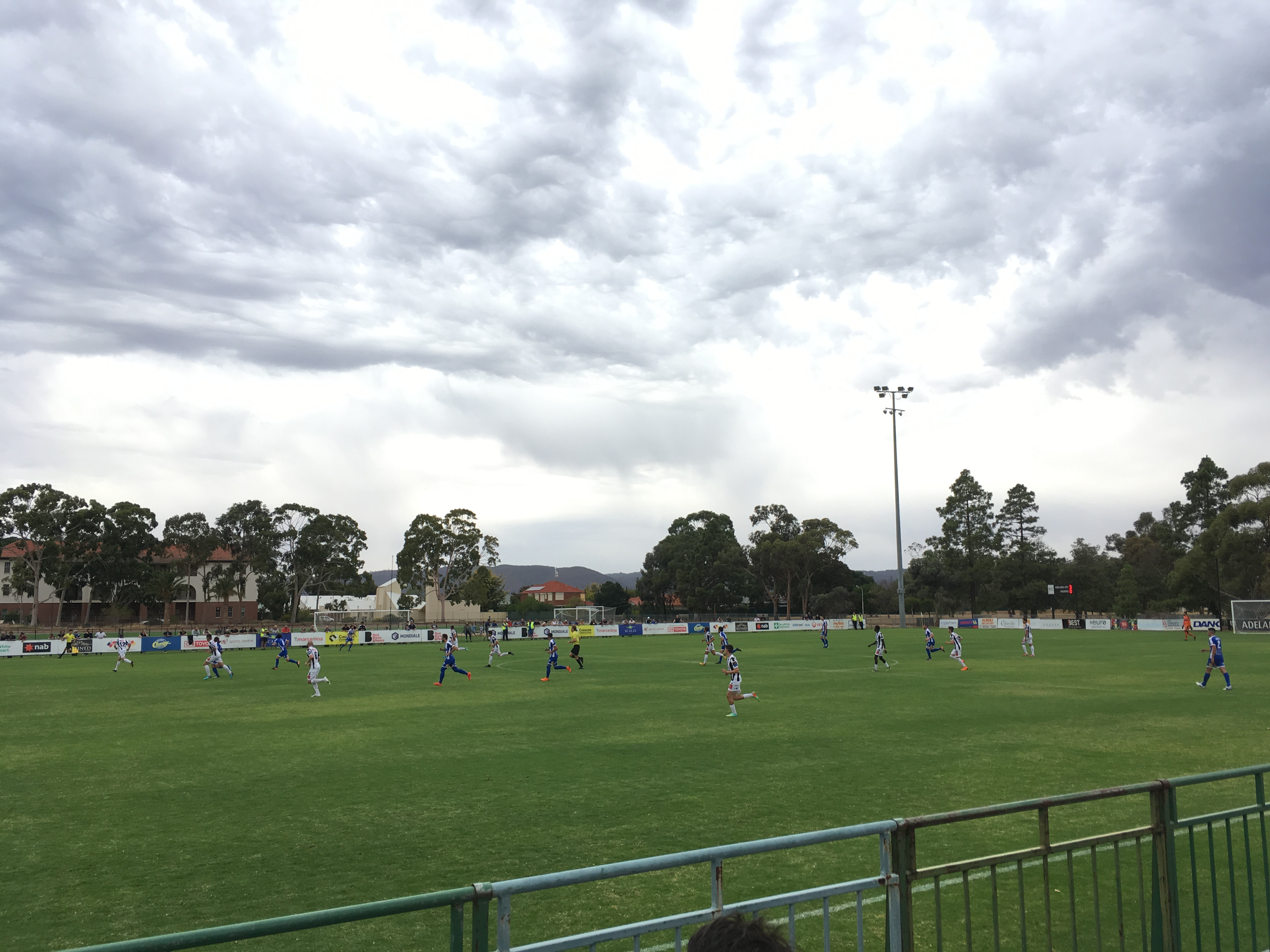
- Interactive map of Adelaide City Park
- Former names: Ram Park
- Location: Hilltop Drive, Oakden, South Australia
- Coordinates: 34°51′06″S 138°38′11″E
- Capacity: 5,000
- Surface: Grass

Tenant
- Adelaide City

Adelaide City Park is a multi-use stadium in Adelaide, Australia. It is mainly used for Association football and has been the home ground for Adelaide City since 2004. The stadium has a capacity of 5,500 people. The ground was used by National Rugby League Adelaide Rams as a training base and headquarters, and was known as Ram Park, from 1997 until 1998 when the club went defunct.
