= Jim Muir (soccer) =

Scottish footballer (born 1949)

Personal information
- Full name: Jim Paterson Muir
- Date of birth: 30 January 1949 (age 77)
- Positions: Centre forward; centre half

Youth career
- Irvine Victoria

Senior career*
Years	Team	Apps	(Gls)
1967–1975	Motherwell	110	(31)
1974–1979	Dumbarton	114	(21)
1978–1980	Adelaide City	29	(4)
1980–1981	Marconi	26	(1)
1981-1983	Eastern	38	(2)

International career
1980	Australia	5	(0)
- * Club domestic league appearances and goals

Jim Paterson "Jumbo" Muir (born 30 January 1949) is a former footballer who played as centre forward for Motherwell and as centre half for Dumbarton. He later played in Australia, representing the Australia national soccer team five times.

== Playing career ==
=== Club career ===
Muir played junior football for Irvine Victoria, before joining Motherwell. He played 110 times between 1967 and 1975, before joining Dumbarton. At Dumbarton, Muir played 114 times before leaving to play in Australia. He joined Adelaide City, playing 29 times between 1978 and 1980.

During the 1980 National Soccer League season, Muir transferred to Marconi. After the 1981 season, Muir transferred to Eastern in Hong Kong for a A$45,000 transfer fee.

=== International career ===
Despite not holding Australian citizenship, Muir was selected to play for the Australia national soccer team in 1980. He played five times for Australia in full international matches, all in 1980.

== Honours ==
Marconi

- NSL Cup: 1980
