= Glenn Dods =

New Zealand footballer

Personal information
- Full name: Glenn Laurence Dods
- Date of birth: 17 November 1958 (age 67)
- Place of birth: Whanganui, New Zealand
- Height: 1.81 m (5 ft 11 in)
- Position: Defender

Youth career
- 1970 – 1972: New Plymouth Boys High School

Senior career*
Years	Team	Apps	(Gls)
1973	Moturoa United	18	(10)
1974	Mount Wellington		
1978	Blockhouse Bay	22	(1)
1979	Adelaide City		

International career
1976–1982	New Zealand	22	(0)
- * Club domestic league appearances and goals

Glenn Laurence Dods (born 17 November 1958) is a successful New Zealand association football player who represented the New Zealand national football team 22 times from 1976 to the 1982.

He was part of the All Whites squad that took part in the 1982 FIFA World Cup finals, playing against both USSR and Brazil.

Dods was appointed the Football Director at Adelaide City FC in May 2019.

== Club history ==
• Fitzroy AFC

• New Plymouth Boys' High School XI

• 1972 - New Plymouth United

• 1973 - Moturoa United

• 1974 - Mt Wellington AFC

• 1978 - Blockhouse Bay

• 1979 - 1984 - Adelaide City
