= Charlie Villani =

Australian soccer player

Personal information
- Full name: Carlo Villani
- Date of birth: 2 March 1963 (age 63)
- Position: Forward

Youth career
- Adelaide Villa

Senior career*
Years	Team	Apps	(Gls)
1979–1993	Adelaide City	252	(58)
1994	Para Hills Knights	12	(0)

International career
1987	Australia	1	(0)
1987	Australia B	4	(0)

Managerial career
- 1994: Para Hills Knights
- 2002: Adelaide City
- 2008–2009: Western Strikers
- 2009: Adelaide City
- 2010–: Western Strikers
- * Club domestic league appearances and goals

Carlo "Charlie" Villani (born 2 March 1963) is an Australian former soccer player who played as a forward.

== Club career ==
Villani began his senior career at Adelaide City in the National Soccer League where he played between 1979 and 1993.

== International career ==
Villani played one full international match in 1987 for Australia when he came on as an 83rd-minute substitute against Morocco in Gangneung.

He also played four matches with the Socceroo B team.

== Coaching career ==
In 2002 Villani coached Adelaide City in the National Soccer League before resigning mid-season after a poor run of results.

On 22 October 2009, he was appointed as coach of the Adelaide City who were then in the South Australian Super League.
