= Agenor Muniz =

Brazilian footballer and manager (born 1949)

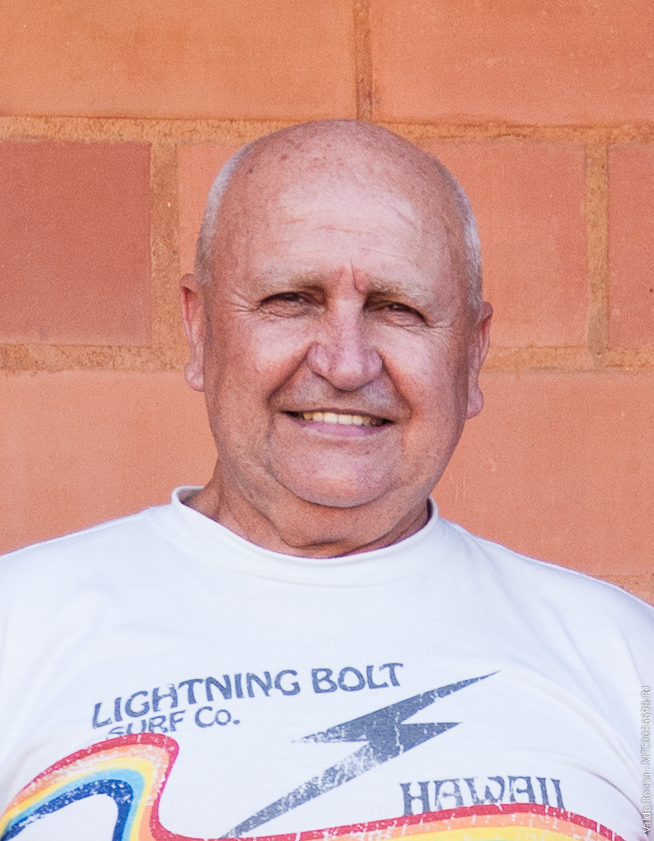

Personal information
- Full name: Agenor Muniz
- Date of birth: 24 June 1949 (age 77)
- Place of birth: Sapucaia, Brazil
- Height: 1.78 m (5 ft 10 in)
- Position: Midfielder

Senior career*
Years	Team	Apps	(Gls)
1967–1971	Vasco da Gama		
1971–1977	Eastern Suburbs	5+	(2+)
1977–1980	Adelaide City	82	(8)
1981	Sydney City	8	(0)
1984–1990	Dulwich Hill		

International career
1975–1978	Australia	20	(1)

Managerial career
- 2003: Dulwich Hill
- * Club domestic league appearances and goals

Agenor Muniz (born 24 June 1949) is a former footballer. Originally from CR Vasco da Gama in the Brazilian metropolis Rio de Janeiro, in 1971 he joined Eastern Suburbs Hakoah, later well known as Sydney City in Australia, where he won several titles. To date he remains the sole Brazilian to ever play for the Australian national football team in an official match.

== Career ==
The winger and midfielder Muniz played for Brazilian team CR Vasco da Gama in Rio de Janeiro from 1966 to 1971. In 1971, he was brought to Australia alongside four more Brazilians, including Hilton Silva and Luis de Melo, by then so-called Eastern Suburbs Hakoah of Sydney. With the club he won the NSW Premiership of 1971, 1973 and 1974 and the Ampol Cup of 1973. In 1977, he won with the club the Australian Championship by winning the first edition of the National Soccer League.

He joined league competitor Adelaide City in early May 1997 With the club he won the 1979 Cup of Australia defeating St. George in the final 3–2. In 1980 Agenor Muniz was runner-up as Player of the Year behind Queensland policeman Jim Hermiston, a former Scottish Aberdeen FC player.

Between 1984 and 1990 "Agi" joined Portugal Madeira Club / Dulwich Hill Madeira later known as Dulwich Hill FC as Captain / Coach and progressed the club from NSW Inter Urban Fourth Division First Grade through to NSW Division One First Grade

Muniz played 20 times for the Australia men's national soccer team between 1975 and 1978. In the 2003 NSW Winter Super League Muniz coached Dulwich Hill
