= Bugsy Nyskohus =

Australian soccer player (born 1950)

Bugsy Nyskohus OAM
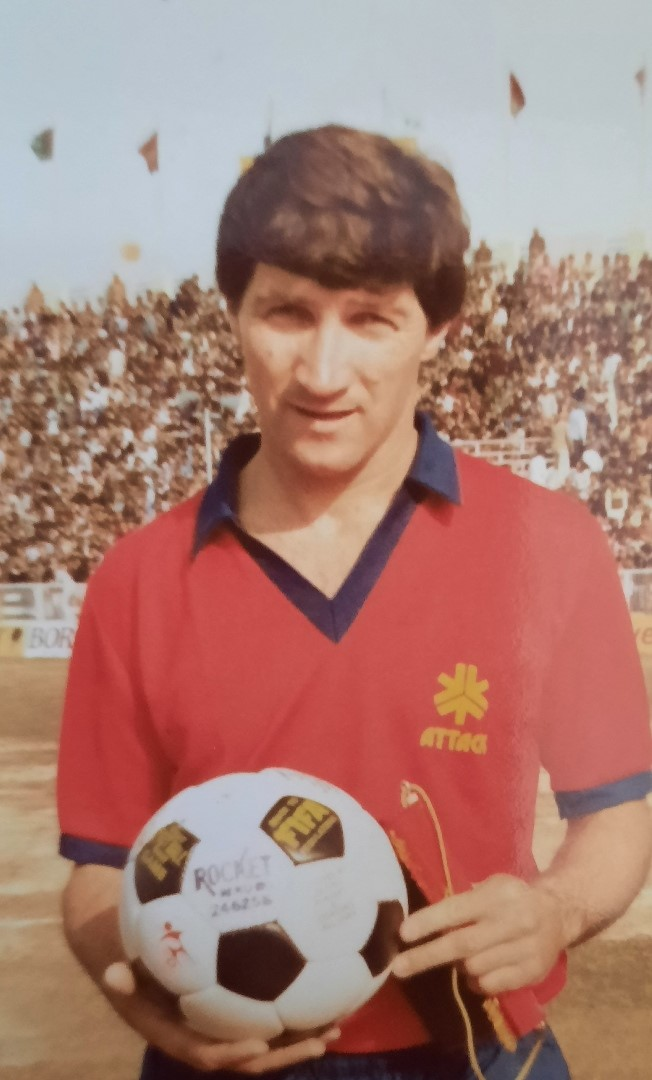
- Nyskohus with the South Australia State team in 1986

Personal information
- Position: Defender

Senior career*
Years	Team	Apps	(Gls)
- USC Lion
1977–1989	Adelaide City	301	(4)

International career
1972	Australia	3	(0)
- * Club domestic league appearances and goals

Bohdan "Bugsy" Nyskohus OAM (born 28 June 1950) is an Australian former soccer player who played as a defender. He began his career with South Australian team USC Lion before playing 13 years in the National Soccer League (NSL) for Adelaide City. He is the older brother of fellow Australia national soccer team player John Nyskohus and USC Lion player Peter Nyskohus.

== Club career ==
Nyskohus was born in Woodside, South Australia. He began his senior football career with Ukrainian Sports Club Lion in the South Australian State League.

Nyskohus started playing soccer when he was 13 years old with the Ukrainian Lion Soccer Club (USC). By the time he was 18 in 1968, he was playing state league level with USC and played his first game for the South Australian State team. He is a life member of the South Australia Soccer Federation, Adelaide City and USC Lion. He later played for and captained Adelaide City in the Australian National Soccer League (NSL) between 1977 and 1989.

Nyskohus won the West End Medal for player of the year award in 1971.

Nyskohus played in all of the first 13 seasons of the NSL, becoming the first person to play 300 NSL games. In total Bugsy played 446 games for Adelaide City, 300 of which were NSL.

"Bugsy without doubt is a legend of the game in South Australia with his consistently calm and controlled performance in defence each week being exceptional."

Nyskohus was awarded an OAM for services to soccer in 1991.

After retiring from national League, Nyskohus coached White City Beograd in the State League, 1st Division for 4 years (1992-1995).

In 2003, Nyskohus was inducted into the inaugural South Australian Soccer Federation Hall of Fame, in the Hall of Champions for outstanding performance.

== State representative career ==
Nyskohus holds the record for the most appearances for the South Australia state team, playing 66 times.

== International career ==
Nyskohus played three full international matches for Australia, making his debut against New Zealand in a friendly in Jakarta. He also played in two B-international matches for Australia against a touring Wolverhampton Wanderers team.

== Statistics ==
Team/ Club	Games played
Adelaide City (State and NSL)	446
South Australian State Team	66
USC Lion	279
White City Woodville	50
