= Gary Marocchi =

Australian soccer player and coach

Personal information
- Full name: Gary Donald Marocchi
- Date of birth: 24 April 1955 (age 71)
- Place of birth: Western Australia, Australia
- Position: Midfielder

Senior career*
Years	Team	Apps	(Gls)
1971–1976	Perth Azzurri		
1977–1982	Adelaide City	125	(16)

International career^{‡}
1975–1978	Australia	13	(0)

Managerial career
- 1991–1993: Perth Azzurri
- 1994: Perth Kangaroos
- 1996–1999: Perth Glory
- 2003–2005: Swan IC
- * Club domestic league appearances and goals as of 15 July 2007 ‡ National team caps and goals as of 15 July 2007

Gary Donald Marocchi (born 24 April 1955, in Western Australia) is an Australian football (soccer) coach and former player. He is currently the President of the Perth Soccer Club.

== Playing career ==
Marocchi represented Australia 13 times in full internationals playing as a midfielder. His playing career at club level began in Perth in 1971 with Perth Azzurri in the Western Australia State League and concluded in 1980 with Adelaide City in the National Soccer League. He represented Western Australia 22 times and South Australia three times.

== Coaching career ==
Marocchi's first venture into coaching at semi-professional level was with Perth Italia in 1991. He remained at Perth Italia until he joined Perth Kangaroos where in 1994 he coached the Kangaroos to the FAS Premier League league title. When Perth Glory entered the National Soccer League in 1996 Marocchi was chosen to lead the new team. His tenure saw the Glory narrowly miss the post-season final series in each of his two seasons in charge. He was replaced by Bernd Stange before the beginning of the 1998–99 season. In 2003, he joined Swan IC in the WA State League where he coached until June 2005 when he resigned, stating player performance issues as one reason for his departure.
