= John Perin =

Australian soccer player and coach

Personal information
- Date of birth: 10 June 1947 (age 79)
- Place of birth: Montebelluna, Italy
- Position: Midfielder

Senior career*
Years	Team	Apps	(Gls)
1977–1982	Adelaide City		

International career
1969–1970	Australia	5	(0)

Managerial career
- 1982: Adelaide City
- 1995–1996: Adelaide City
- * Club domestic league appearances and goals as of 8 May 2009

John Perin (born 10 June 1948) is an Australian former football (soccer) player and coach. Perin played five times for Australia.

Perin is a member of the Australian Football Hall of Fame.
