= West Adelaide SC =

West Adelaide
- Full name: West Adelaide Soccer Club
- Nicknames: Hellas, Westies
- Founded: 1962; 64 years ago 2008; 18 years ago (reformed)
- Dissolved: 1999; 27 years ago
- Ground: Kilburn Sports Complex
- Capacity: 5,000 (1,300 seated)
- Chairman: John Tsianos
- League: NPL South Australia
- 2026: 10th of 12
- Website: www.westadelaide.com.au
Home colours	Away colours

West Adelaide Soccer Club is an Australian soccer club currently playing in National Premier Leagues South Australia. Traditionally named Hellas, the club was founded by members of the Greek community of Adelaide. West Adelaide became a founding member of the National Soccer League in 1977 and a year later became the first Adelaide team to be crowned national champion when it won the 1978 National Soccer League after a 1–1 draw in the final round match with Adelaide City in the local derby.

One of the most successful clubs in South Australia, West Adelaide competed in the national league for 19 seasons, interrupted briefly by two short periods in which it was relegated back to state competition. In the late 1990s, the club renamed itself the Adelaide Sharks in an effort to attract support beyond its traditional base in the Greek community. At the end of the 1998–99 National Soccer League season, the club was overcome by financial turmoil and entered administration. West withdrew from the national competition, and its senior arm declared bankruptcy. The club's juniors legally separated from the club and remained afloat.

In 2007, West Adelaide fielding senior teams in the South Australian competition once again. West gained promotion to the second tier in 2012 and returned to the top tier a year later, winning its first South Australian championship in 2015.

== History ==
=== Origins and early years ===
West Adelaide's history dates back to 1936, when a small group of early Greek migrants to Adelaide founded the city's first Greek-backed soccer club, simply called Hellenic. The team often played informally at Adelaide High School, paid referees using their own money and, because most Greeks were yet to migrate to Australia, crowds rarely exceeded 100 people.

In 1945, the Greeks founded their club officially under the name Olympic but within 15 years, the South Australian Soccer Federation suspended the club from competition due to crowd violence. The club reformed a year later and re-entered the state league as the Hellenic Athletic and Soccer Club. In 1962, the Greek club merged with the old West Adelaide Soccer Club, which had formed in 1910 and, until that point, did not have ties to the Greek community. The new club, West Adelaide Hellas quickly won promotion to the top tier of South Australian football and became a powerhouse.

In its first 13 years, the club largely competed with Adelaide Juventus for supremacy in the local competition. The clubs shared nine titles between them in 10 years and matches between the two quickly became the major derby of the city.

=== From the state league to national champion ===
Chart of yearly table positions for West Adelaide in NSL

In 1977, West Adelaide became founding members of the National Soccer League, Australia's first national competition for any football code. The club had the honour of scoring the NSL's first goal on 2 April 1977. The goal scorer was Socceroo striker John Kosmina, whom the club had signed for the national league from rival state league club Polonia Adelaide just days earlier. Kosmina's goal in the first ever national league game came against Canberra City at Manuka Oval. West won the game 3–1 in front of a modest crowd of 1700 people. Kosmina, then 20 years old, scored the goal having played two 1978 FIFA World Cup qualification matches for Australia against New Zealand, scoring in one, as well as a cup final for his former club, Polonia.

The club narrowly avoided relegation in the early 1980s and was eventually sent back to the state league after the 1986 season, when the league scrapped the conference system it had used for three seasons. The club spent four of the next five seasons in the relative limbo of the South Australian competition, interrupted by a brief return to the national flight in 1989–90.

West Adelaide was invited back to the national league for the 1991–92 season. However, the club finished second last in its first season back in the top tier. New coach Raul Blanco then led Hellas to the playoffs in 1992–93 and 1994–95.

=== Demise and rebirth ===
In a bid to attract support beyond its traditional base in the Greek community, the club adopted a new name in the mid-1990s – the West Adelaide Sharks. However, the new moniker largely failed to grow the club's membership and a series of unfortunate incidents pushed the club towards a permanent exit from the national league. On 9 June 1998 fire destroyed the Sharks' change rooms and some administrative offices at their new Thebarton Oval base. The damage bill was expected to reach $150,000.

At a general meeting in September 1998, Sharks members backed the privatisation of the club, endorsing prominent Adelaide Greek Australian businessman Con Makris as its new owner with a 51 per cent share of the Sharks. However, the club was to last just one more year in the National Soccer League. Its final hurrah was a 1–0 Adelaide derby win over City – the last time the two clubs would face off in the competition. The Sharks withdrew from the league just before the 1999–2000 season was due to kick-off, debts having mounted.

The club lived on through its junior arm, which was legally separated from the senior club during the messy bankruptcy. The juniors joined with state league club Adelaide Olympic and competed in the South Australian competition from 2000 to 2007. In 2008, West Adelaide and once again fielded its own senior sides in the state league, beginning in the third tier. Its juniors had returned to their original name as West Adelaide a year earlier. The club won promotion to the second tier in 2012 and a year later secured a berth in the top tier, where it had not played since 1999.

Friday 21 February 2014 was a proud day for the club, as it returned to the top tier of South Australian soccer after nine seasons. The Adelaide derby match against Adelaide City, which finished in a 1–1 draw attracted one of the largest attendances (2900 people) in South Australian soccer for many years.

That season, West Adelaide also reached the final of the Federation Cup; with a place in the round of 32 of the inaugural FFA Cup on offer to the winner. West faced its traditional rival Adelaide City in a derby final but lost 4–1 at Hindmarsh Stadium, with City going on to defeat A-League club Western Sydney Wanderers and become the first state league side to eliminate a professional club in that competition.

West did not have to wait long to taste glory again. Coached by former Sharks NSL defender Paul Pezos, the club won the 2015 South Australian premiership and championship. Its title was sealed with a 4–2 grand final win over Adelaide Blue Eagles.

== Colours, badge and nicknames ==
Since its foundation in the early 1960s, West Adelaide has maintained clear visual links to its Greek heritage – notably its white and blue striped playing strips. The club's emblem today remains nearly identical to the badge it wore in the first ever NSL season in 1977. The lone star represents the club's 1978 national championship while the Olympic torch reflects the club's heritage as the original Olympic club from the 1940s.

The club's nickname of Hellas remains in use today, despite efforts by Soccer Australia officials' efforts in the 1990s to force clubs to abolish their ethnic identity or face expulsion from the national league. The Hellas name remains on the club badge and its playing strips. The Sharks nickname adopted by the club during the mid to late-1990s has since fallen out of use.

== Stadium ==
Kilburn Sportsplex prior to a friendly match against Adelaide United

West Adelaide historically played its football at Hindmarsh Stadium, considered the home of soccer in South Australia, even before it entered the National Soccer League.

When the club's senior teams reformed in 2008, they found themselves in search of a permanent home and played home games at the Adelaide Shores Football Centre at West Beach and at Rushworth Reserve, former home of the now-defunct Enfield City Falcons.

On 13 July 2024, the club played its first official game at their new permanent home ground, the Kilburn Sportsplex, in the inner northern Adelaide suburb of Kilburn. The new facility, which cost an estimated A$15 million, has a total capacity of 5,000 people. The Sportsplex was built to include a full-size sports pitch, club offices, a multi-purpose function centre with a capacity for 500 people, undercover spectator seating for 820 people; a photographers' room; press box and media facilities; club dressing rooms for four teams, match official rooms, anti-doping control room; seminar room, café and catering facilities and a physiotherapy suite. The South Australian Government provided A$5.8 million in grants towards construction of the complex.

== Players ==
=== Current squad ===
Note: Flags indicate national team as defined under FIFA eligibility rules; some limited exceptions apply. Players may hold more than one non-FIFA nationality.

No.	Pos.	Nation	Player
2	DF	JPN	Shuto Nakamura
3	DF	AUS	Josh Harvey
4	DF	AUS	Abou Keita
5	DF	AUS	Jacob Butler-Bowdon
6	MF	AUS	Ryan Wood
7	MF	AUS	Kucha Guut
8	MF	AUS	Karl Phelps
9	FW	AUS	Yianni Nestoras
10	FW	AUS	Cooper O'Donnell
11	FW	AUS	Kristos Stefanopoulos
12	DF	AUS	Dimitri Toumazos
13	DF	AUS	Luka Dobrovolski

No.	Pos.	Nation	Player
14	FW	AUS	Peter Katsambis
17	GK	AUS	Harry Finlay
18	FW	AUS	Nicholas Stefanopoulos
21	DF	AUS	Amir Ibrahim
22	MF	AUS	Kevin Kamburu
24	FW	AUS	George Katsigiannis
33	GK	AUS	Kosta Balaban
42	MF	AUS	Connor Gollan
49	DF	AUS	Jacob Athanasiadis
56	GK	AUS	Jackson O'Donnell
—	FW	AUS	Darcy Dawber

== Honours ==
The club has won the following titles and cups:

=== National ===
- National Soccer League

Winners (1): 1978

- National Youth League

Winners (1): 1992–93

=== State ===
- South Australian championships

Winners (11): 1966, 1968, 1969, 1971, 1973, 1976, 1987, 1989, 1990, 1991, 2015

- Federation Cup

Winners (3): 1964, 1967, 1999

- South Australian second tier

Winners (4): 1982, 2013, 2022, 2025

- South Australian third tier

Winners (1): 2012

== Hall of Fame ==
Several of the club's players have been awarded honours by Football Federation Australia:

- National Soccer League Player of the Year – 1985, Graham Honeyman
- National Soccer League U/21 Player of the Years – 1977, John Kosmina
- National Soccer League U/21 Player of the Year – 1995/96, Jim Tsekinis

Football South Australia has inducted the following players and coaches into their Hall of Fame:

- 2003, Award of Distinction, for meritorious performance: Bill Birch (aka Billy Birch, born 20 October 1944 in Southport, Merseyside), who migrated from England in the 1960s after playing for West Bromwich Albion and Crystal Palace FC. Birch contributed to the game as a player and coach, managing Hellas from July 7, 1980 to May 1981. He was also a player Life Member of the South Australian Soccer Federation. He represented South Australia 29 times between 1967 and 1974. He played for Hellas in games that won the Championship, Federation Cup, Ampol Cup and Coca Cola Cup medals.
- 2003, Roll of Honour for meritorious contribution: J.T. (Tom) Forde, who migrated from Belfast, Northern Ireland in 1963. He contributed to the game as a player and coach, playing for and coaching Enfield Soccer Club as well as Hellas. He also set up coaching courses and clinics, represented South Australia as a player and coach, and was appointed as the first SASF Director of Coaching. As a coach, he won many honours, including 1st Division Championship, Federation Cup, Ampol Cup, Coca Cola Cup and West End Cup.
- 2003: Hall of Champions for Outstanding Performance: John Kosmina, who was born in Semaphore, South Australia. He contributed as a player and coach, and was a player Life Member of SASF and a member of Soccer Australia's Hall of Fame. He represented Australia 102 times, scoring 43 goals, including a stint as captain of the Socceroos from 1982 to 1986, and represented South Australia 21 times. He was South Australian Sports Star of the Year in 1976, and became Adelaide United's inaugural coach in 2003.
- 2003: Award of Distinction for meritorious performance: Nick Pantelis (father of Lucas Pantelis), who migrated from the island of Kos, Greece, in 1964.
- 2004: Award of Excellence: Neil McGachey
- 2006: Roll of Honour: Martyn Crook
- 2011: Hall of Honour: Adrian Santrac
- 2012: Hall of Champions: Richie Alagich

Preceded by Eastern Suburbs	NSL Champions; 1978	Succeeded by Marconi Stallions
