= Sergio Melta =

Australian soccer player

Personal information
- Full name: Sergio Melta
- Date of birth: 19 January 1959 (age 67)
- Place of birth: Glenelg, South Australia
- Position: Midfielder

Youth career
- Adelaide City

Senior career*
Years	Team	Apps	(Gls)
1977–1995	Adelaide City	446	(65)

International career^{‡}
1986	Australia	1	(0)

Managerial career
- 2011–2012: Birkalla
- 2013: Adelaide United (asst)
- 2015: White City
- * Club domestic league appearances and goals as of 27 November 2006 ‡ National team caps and goals as of 27 November 2006

Sergio Melta (born 19 January 1959), is an Australian former footballer, who had an extensive career in Australia's National Soccer League (NSL), spent entirely with Adelaide City.

== Playing career ==
=== Club ===
Melta won the NSL's player of the year award in 1984.

=== International ===
Melta was given his international debut by Frank Arok but ultimately played just once for the Australian national team, a friendly against Czechoslovakia played at Hindmarsh Stadium in his home city of Adelaide in 1986. Melta was substituted off after 57 minutes during the 0–1 loss.

== Coaching career ==
Melta took over the head coaching role of West Torrens Birkalla in the FFSA Premier League. On 5 February 2013 he was appointed as assistant coach for A-League club Adelaide United. He is the current coach/manager of White City which competes in National Premier Leagues South Australia.

== Career statistics ==
=== Club ===
Appearances and goals by club, season and competition
Club	Season	League			Total	
Club	Season	Division	Apps	Goals	Apps	Goals
Adelaide City	1977	National Soccer League	22	1	22	1
Adelaide City	1978	National Soccer League	8	1	8	1
Adelaide City	1979	National Soccer League	8	0	8	0
Adelaide City	1980	National Soccer League	24	2	24	2
Adelaide City	1981	National Soccer League	29	5	29	5
Adelaide City	1982	National Soccer League	29	5	29	5
Adelaide City	1983	National Soccer League	29	4	29	4
Adelaide City	1984	National Soccer League	27	7	27	5
Adelaide City	1985	National Soccer League	17	2	17	2
Adelaide City	1986	National Soccer League	27	8	27	8
Adelaide City	1987	National Soccer League	23	3	23	3
Adelaide City	1988	National Soccer League	25	9	25	9
Adelaide City	1989	National Soccer League	26	6	26	6
Adelaide City	1989–90	National Soccer League	25	3	25	3
Adelaide City	1990–91	National Soccer League	25	4	25	4
Adelaide City	1991–92	National Soccer League	21	2	21	2
Adelaide City	1992–93	National Soccer League	26	3	26	3
Adelaide City	1993–94	National Soccer League	31	0	31	0
Adelaide City	1994–95	National Soccer League	24	2	24	2
Career total			446	65	446	65

=== International ===
Appearances and goals by national team and year
National team	Year	Apps	Goals
Australia	1986	1	0
Total		1	0

== Honours ==
With Adelaide City:

- NSL Championship: 1986, 1991–92, 1993–94
- NSL Cup: 1977, 1989, 1991–92

Personal honours:

- NSL Player of the Year: 1984 with Adelaide City
- FFA Hall of Champions Inaugural inductee – 1999
