= John Nyskohus =

Australian soccer player (born 1951)

John Nyskohus (born 15 October 1951) is an Australian former soccer player who played as a forward for USC Lion in the South Australian State League and Adelaide City in the National Soccer League. At international level, he played 36 times for Australia, including 22 in full international matches.
