= List of top National Soccer League goal scorers by season =

- Awarded for: The leading goalscorer in a given NSL season.
- Country: Australia
- Presented by: National Soccer League
- First award: 1977
- Final award: 2003–04

Highlights
- Most awards: Damian Mori 5

The National Soccer League was the top level soccer competition in Australia between 1977 to 2004, set up and run by Soccer Australia before later being administered by the Australian Soccer Association. This lasted for 28 seasons before being succeeded by the A-League, which commenced in 2005–06.

22 different players across 13 different clubs have been top scorers in an NSL season. Damian Mori has won the award the most, winning five times (three with Adelaide City and two with Perth Glory) whilst Gary Cole, Duggie Brown, Frank Farina, David Seal, and Mark Viduka have also won the award twice. Marconi and South Melbourne are the clubs with the most recipients, with five apiece.

== Winners ==
Player (X)	Name of the player and number of times they had won the award at that point (if more than one)
Games	The number of NSL regular season games played by the winner that season (Note: This does not necessarily match the total number of games in a season.)
Rate	The winner's goals-to-games ratio that regular season
§	Denotes the club were champions in the same season

Season	Player	Nationality	Club	Goals	Games	Rate	Ref(s)
1977	Dixie Deans	Scotland	Adelaide City	16	19	0.84	
1978	Ken Boden	Australia	Newcastle United	14	26	0.54	
1978	Clive Eaton	Australia	Western Suburbs	14	26	0.54	
1979	Mark Jankovics	Australia	Marconi^{§}	18	23	0.78	
1980	Gary Cole	Australia	Heidelberg	21	26	0.81	
1981	Gary Cole (2)	Australia	Heidelberg	16	30	0.53	
1982	John Kosmina	Australia	Sydney City^{§}	23	28	0.82	
1983	Duggie Brown	Australia	South Melbourne	16	28	0.57	
1984	Duggie Brown (2)	Australia	South Melbourne^{§}	22	32	0.69	
1985	Charlie Egan	Australia	South Melbourne	21	24	0.88	
1986	Graham Arnold	Australia	Sydney Croatia	15	24	0.63	
1987	Frank Farina	Australia	Marconi	16	23	0.70	
1988	Frank Farina (2)	Australia	Marconi^{§}	16	24	0.67	
1989	Zlatko Nastevski	Yugoslavia	Marconi^{§}	20	27	0.74	
1989–90	David Seal	Australia	Sydney Croatia	15	26	0.58	
1990–91	David Seal (2)	Australia	Marconi	19	28	0.68	
1991–92	Tim Bredbury	Hong Kong	Sydney Olympic	15	26	0.58	
1991–92	Kimon Taliadoros	Australia	South Melbourne	15	26	0.58	
1992–93	Francis Awaritefe	Australia	South Melbourne	19	28	0.68	
1993–94	Mark Viduka	Australia	Melbourne Knights	16	21	0.76	
1994–95	Mark Viduka (2)	Australia	Melbourne Knights^{§}	18	24	0.75	
1995–96	Damian Mori	Australia	Adelaide City	31	36	0.86	
1996–97	David Zdrilic	Australia	Sydney United	21	30	0.70	
1997–98	Damian Mori (2)	Australia	Adelaide City	19	27	0.70	
1998–99	Mile Sterjovski	Australia	Sydney United	18	26	0.69	
1998–99	Pablo Cardozo	Australia	Sydney Olympic	18	28	0.64	
1999–2000	Damian Mori (3)	Australia	Adelaide City	22	34	0.65	
2000–01	Sasho Petrovski	Australia	Wollongong Wolves^{§}	21	28	0.75	
2001–02	Damian Mori (4)	Australia	Perth Glory	17	27	0.63	
2002–03	Damian Mori (5)	Australia	Perth Glory^{§}	24	31	0.77	
2003–04	Ante Milicic	Australia	Parramatta Power	20	26	0.77	

== Awards won by club ==
Club	Total
Marconi	5
South Melbourne	5
Adelaide City	4
Sydney Croatia/Sydney United	4
Heidelberg	2
Melbourne Knights	2
Perth Glory	2
Sydney Olympic	2
Newcastle United	1
Parramatta Power	1
Sydney City	1
Western Suburbs	1
Wollongong Wolves	1

== See also ==
- A-League Men Golden Boot
