= 1989–90 Wollongong City FC season =

Wollongong City
1989–90 season
- Chairman: Laurie Kelly
- Manager: David Ratcliffe
- Stadium: Brandon Park
- National Soccer League: 11th
- NSL Cup: First round
- Highest home attendance: 2,487 vs. Sydney Olympic (18 February 1990)
- Lowest home attendance: 636 vs. South Melbourne (8 April 1990)
- Biggest win: 7–0 vs. West Adelaide (18 March 1990)
- Biggest defeat: 0–6 vs. St George (25 March 1990)

The 1989–90 season was the tenth in the history of Wollongong City. It was also the club's tenth season in the National Soccer League. In addition to the domestic league, the club also participated in the NSL Cup. Wollongong City finished 11th in their National Soccer League season, and were eliminated in the NSL Cup first round by Marconi Fairfield.

== Players ==
Note: Flags indicate national team as defined under FIFA eligibility rules; some limited exceptions apply. Players may hold more than one non-FIFA nationality.

| No. | Pos. | Nation | Player |
|---|---|---|---|
| — | GK | AUS | George Bouhoutsos |
| — | GK | AUS | Mick Atsas |
| — | GK | AUS | Dragan Pupovac |
| — | DF | AUS | Jeff Allport |
| — | DF | AUS | Peter Kotamanidis |
| — | DF | AUS | Jock Morlando |
| — | DF | AUS | David Skeen |
| — | DF | AUS | Ray Vliestra |
| — | DF | AUS | Richard Lloyd |
| — | DF | ENG | David Ratcliffe |
| — | MF | AUS | Mineo Bonetig |
| — | MF | AUS | Jason Higgs |
| — | MF | AUS | Michael Lardis |
| — | MF | AUS | Zivko Hristovski |
| — | MF | AUS | Derek O'Neill |

| No. | Pos. | Nation | Player |
|---|---|---|---|
| — | MF | ENG | Jerry Murphy |
| — | MF | AUS | Stephen Baggott |
| — | MF | AUS | Darren McEvoy |
| — | FW | AUS | Pat Brodnik |
| — | FW | SCO | Danny Crainie |
| — | FW | AUS | Randell Easthorpe |
| — | FW | AUS | Paul McFadden |
| — | FW | AUS | David Batten |
| — | FW | AUS | John Danzo |
| — | FW | AUS | Danny Petkovic |
| — | MF | AUS | David Roberts |
| — | MF | AUS | Steve Krishna |
| — | MF | AUS | Anthony Versi |
| — | DF | AUS | Richard Vidal |
| — | | AUS | Angelo Piacentin |

Source: National Soccer League Yearbook 1989–90,

== Competitions ==
=== Overall record ===
| Competition | First match | Last match | Starting round | Final position | Record | | | | | | | |
| Competition | First match | Last match | Starting round | Final position | Pld | W | D | L | GF | GA | GD | Win % |
|---|---|---|---|---|---|---|---|---|---|---|---|---|
| National Soccer League | 4 November 1989 | 25 April 2025 | Matchday 1 | 11th | 26 | 8 | 4 | 14 | 30 | 48 | −18 | 30.77 |
| NSL Cup | 21 February 1990 | | First round | First round | 1 | 0 | 0 | 1 | 1 | 2 | −1 | 0.00 |
| Total | | | | | 27 | 8 | 4 | 15 | 31 | 50 | −19 | 29.63 |

Last updated: complete
Source: Competitions

=== National Soccer League ===
==== League table ====
| Pos | Team | Pld | W | D | L | GF | GA | GD | Pts | Qualification or relegation |
|---|---|---|---|---|---|---|---|---|---|---|
| 9 | Preston Makedonia | 26 | 9 | 5 | 12 | 33 | 35 | −2 | 23 | |
| 10 | St George-Budapest | 26 | 7 | 7 | 12 | 35 | 44 | −9 | 21 | |
| 11 | Wollongong City | 26 | 8 | 4 | 14 | 30 | 48 | −18 | 20 | |
| 12 | Sunshine George Cross | 26 | 6 | 5 | 15 | 24 | 49 | −25 | 17 | |
| 13 | West Adelaide (R) | 26 | 5 | 4 | 17 | 21 | 54 | −33 | 14 | Relegation to the South Australian Division 1 |

Updated to match(es) played on unknown. Source: rsssf.com
Rules for classification: 1) points; 2) goal difference; 3) number of goals scored.
(R) Relegated

==== Results summary ====
| Overall | | | | | | | | Home | | | | | | Away | | | | | |
| Pld | W | D | L | GF | GA | GD | Pts | W | D | L | GF | GA | GD | W | D | L | GF | GA | GD |
|---|---|---|---|---|---|---|---|---|---|---|---|---|---|---|---|---|---|---|---|
| 26 | 8 | 4 | 14 | 30 | 48 | −18 | 20 | 5 | 2 | 6 | 22 | 25 | −3 | 3 | 2 | 8 | 8 | 23 | −15 |

Source: worldfootball.net

==== Results by round ====
| Round | 1 | 2 | 3 | 4 | 5 | 6 | 7 | 8 | 9 | 10 | 11 | 12 | 13 | 14 | 15^{1} | 16 | 17 | 18 | 19 | 20 | 21 | 22 | 23 | 24 | 25^{2} | 26 |
|---|---|---|---|---|---|---|---|---|---|---|---|---|---|---|---|---|---|---|---|---|---|---|---|---|---|---|
| Ground | H | A | H | A | H | A | H | A | A | H | A | H | A | A | H | A | H | A | H | A | H | H | A | H | A | H |
| Result | L | W | W | L | W | D | L | L | W | D | D | L | L | L | W | L | D | W | L | L | W | L | L | L | L | W |
| Position | =11 | =9 | 5 | 9 | 7 | 7 | 8 | 10 | 8 | 8 | 8 | 9 | 10 | 12 | 11 | 11 | 11 | 10 | 11 | 11 | 10 | 10 | 11 | 11 | 11 | 11 |
| Points | 0 | 2 | 4 | 4 | 6 | 7 | 7 | 7 | 9 | 10 | 11 | 11 | 11 | 11 | 13 | 13 | 14 | 16 | 16 | 16 | 18 | 18 | 18 | 18 | 18 | 20 |

Source: worldfootball.net
A = Away; H = Home; W = Win; D = Draw; L = Loss
Notes:
^{1} Matchday 15 was a split round (match played after Round 16), however Wollongong's points and position are retroactively adjusted for the end of the round.

^{2} Matchday 25 was played after Round 26, however Wollongong's points and position are retroactively adjusted for the end of the round.

==== Matches ====
| 4 November 1989 1 | Wollongong City | 0–2 | Adelaide City | Fairy Meadow, Wollongong |
| | | Report | A. Vidmar 25'; Veart 90' | Stadium: Brandon Park; Attendance: 1,223; Referee: Gary Power |

| 11 November 1989 2 | APIA Leichhardt | 1–2 | Wollongong City | Leichhardt, Sydney |
| | Murray 67' | Report | McFadden 14'; Crainie 44' | Stadium: Lambert Park; Attendance: 1,630; Referee: Richard Lorenc |

| 18 November 1989 3 | Wollongong City | 2–0 | Preston Makendonia | Fairy Meadow, Wollongong |
| | Piculovksi 81' (o.g.); Morlando 84' | Report | | Stadium: Brandon Park; Attendance: 2,012; Referee: Bill Monteverde |

| 24 November 1989 4 | Sydney Olympic | 1–0 | Wollongong City | Rockdale, Sydney |
| | Ironside 28' | Report | | Stadium: St George Stadium; Attendance: 2,418; Referee: David Willcocks |

| 3 December 1989 5 | Wollongong City | 3–2 | Blacktown City | Fairy Meadow, Wollongong |
| | Batten 56', 63', 78' | Report | Longo 7'; Gee 44' | Stadium: Brandon Park; Attendance: 1,575; Referee: Manny Loupis |

| 9 December 1989 6 | Marconi | 0–0 | Wollongong City | Bossley Park, Sydney |
| | | Report | | Stadium: Marconi Stadium; Attendance: 2,309; Referee: Bill Monteverde |

| 17 December 1989 7 | Wollongong City | 0–4 | Melbourne Croatia | Fairy Meadow, Wollongong |
| | | Report | Milosevic 43'; Caleta 28', 58', 85' | Stadium: Brandon Park; Attendance: 2,310; Referee: John McConnell |

| 22 December 1989 8 | West Adelaide | 4–1 | Wollongong City | Hindmarsh, Adelaide |
| | Blair 20', 21'; Kidd 27'; Rankin 70' | Report | Easthorpe 76' | Stadium: Hindmarsh Stadium; Attendance: 2,700; Referee: Tom McRoe |

| 29 December 1989 9 | St George | 1–3 | Wollongong City | Rockdale, Sydney |
| | Bingley 26' | Report | O'Neill 9'; Hristovski 44' (pen.), 85' | Stadium: St George Stadium; Attendance: 558; Referee: Dennis Voutsinas |

| 7 January 1990 10 | Wollongong City | 0–0 | Melita Eagles | Fairy Meadow, Wollongong |
| | | Report | | Stadium: Brandon Park; Attendance: 2,319; Referee: Gary Power |

| 13 January 1990 11 | South Melbourne | 0–0 | Wollongong City | Middle Park, Melbourne |
| | | Report | | Stadium: Middle Park Stadium; Attendance: 2,138; Referee: Jim Rossis |

| 21 January 1990 12 | Wollongong City | 1–3 | Sydney Croatia | Fairy Meadow, Wollongong |
| | Brodnik 80' | Report | Lamond 35'; Seal 50', 66' | Stadium: Brandon Park; Attendance: 2,344; Referee: John McConnell |

| 26 January 1990 13 | Sunshine George Cross | 1–0 | Wollongong City | Braybrook, Melbourne |
| | Foster 4' | Report | | Stadium: Skinner Reserve; Attendance: 1,576; Referee: Manny Loupis |

| 28 January 1990 14 | Adelaide City | 3–0 | Wollongong City | Hindmarsh, South Australia, Adelaide |
| | Maxwell 3', 84', 89' | Report | | Stadium: Hindmarsh Stadium; Attendance: 6,854 (DH); Referee: John McConnell |

| 11 February 1990 16 | Preston Makedonia | 2–0 | Wollongong City | Reservoir, Melbourne |
| | Smith 85', 87' | Report | | Stadium: B.T. Connor Reserve; Attendance: 3,800; Referee: John Fraser |

| 14 February 1990 15 | Wollongong City | 2–1 | APIA Leichhardt | Fairy Meadow, Wollongong |
| | Brodnik 44', 63' | Report | van Blerk 85' | Stadium: Brandon Park; Attendance: 1,121; Referee: Gary Power |

| 18 February 1990 17 | Wollongong City | 3–3 | Sydney Olympic | Fairy Meadow, Wollongong |
| | McFadden 6', 57'; Easthorpe 61' | Report | Saad 37', 44', 71' | Stadium: Brandon Park; Attendance: 2,487; Referee: Richard Lorenc |

| 24 February 1990 18 | Blacktown City | 1–2 | Wollongong City | Seven Hills, Sydney |
| | Gunning 89' | Report | Hristovski 40'; Easthorpe 86' | Stadium: Gabbie Stadium; Attendance: 1,002; Referee: Bill Monteverde |

| 4 March 1990 19 | Wollongong City | 0–2 | Marconi | Fairy Meadow, Wollongong |
| | | Report | Gray 20'; Gomez 73' | Stadium: Brandon Park; Attendance: 1,721; Referee: Peter Spiers |

| 11 March 1990 20 | Melbourne Croatia | 3–0 | Wollongong City | Sunshine North, Melbourne |
| | Kelic 3'; Adzic 76' (pen.); Milosevic 79' | Report | | Stadium: Somers Street Stadium; Attendance: 1,850; Referee: Tom McRoe |

| 18 March 1990 21 | Wollongong City | 7–0 | West Adelaide Hellas | Fairy Meadow, Wollongong |
| | Brodnik 3', 31', 50', 62', 67', 87'; Hristovski 25' | Report | | Stadium: Brandon Park; Attendance: 1,102; Referee: Gary Power |

| 25 March 1990 22 | Wollongong City | 0–6 | St George | Fairy Meadow, Wollongong |
| | | Report | Krslovic 3', 88'; Harper 54', 56', 73'; El Ali 87' | Stadium: Brandon Park; Attendance: 1,300; Referee: Gary Power |

| 1 April 1990 23 | Melita Eagles | 2–0 | Wollongong City | South Granville, Sydney |
| | Soper 32'; Brown 84' | Report | | Stadium: Melita Stadium; Attendance: 2,196; Referee: John McConnell |

| 8 April 1990 24 | Wollongong City | 0–2 | South Melbourne | Fairy Meadow, Wollongong |
| | | Report | Taliadoros 14'; Trimboli 17' | Stadium: Brandon Park; Attendance: 636; Referee: John Fraser |

| 25 April 1990 26 | Wollongong City | 4–0 | Sunshine George Cross | Fairy Meadow, Wollongong |
| | Skeen 38', 77'; Petkovic 52'; Easthorpe 64' | Report | | Stadium: Brandon Park; Attendance: 1,049; Referee: Bill Monteverde |

| 28 April 1990 25 | Sydney Croatia | 4–0 | Wollongong City | Edensor Park, Sydney |
| | Seal 25', 60', 77'; Ricoy 80' | Report | | Stadium: Croatian Sports Centre; Attendance: 710; Referee: Dean Voutsinas |

=== NSL Cup ===
| 21 February 1990 1 | Marconi | 2–1 | Wollongong City | Bossley Park, Sydney |
| | Glavovic 57'; van Egmond 89' | Report | Lardis 65' | Stadium: Marconi Stadium; Attendance: 1,553; Referee: Manny Loupis |

== Statistics ==
=== Appearances and goals ===
Players with no appearances not included in the list.

| No. | Pos | Nat | Player | Total | | National Soccer League | | NSL Finals series | | NSL Cup | |
| No. | Pos | Nat | Player | Apps | Goals | Apps | Goals | Apps | Goals | Apps | Goals |
|---|---|---|---|---|---|---|---|---|---|---|---|
| | DF | (Australia) AUS | Jeff Allport | 9 | 0 | 9 | 0 | 0 | 0 | 0 | 0 |
| | FW | (Australia) AUS | Pat Brodnik | 14 | 9 | 14 | 9 | 0 | 0 | 0 | 0 |
| | GK | (Australia) AUS | George Bouhoutsos | 12 | 0 | 12 | 0 | 0 | 0 | 0 | 0 |
| | MF | (Australia) AUS | Stephen Baggott | 1 | 0 | 1 | 0 | 0 | 0 | 0 | 0 |
| | FW | (Australia) AUS | David Batten | 5 | 3 | 5 | 3 | 0 | 0 | 0 | 0 |
| | FW | (Scotland) SCO | Danny Crainie | 26 | 1 | 25 | 1 | 0 | 0 | 1 | 0 |
| | FW | (Australia) AUS | John Danzo | 2 | 0 | 2 | 0 | 0 | 0 | 0 | 0 |
| | FW | (Australia) AUS | Randell Easthorpe | 23 | 4 | 23 | 4 | 0 | 0 | 0 | 0 |
| | MF | (Australia) AUS | Zivko Hristovski | 22 | 4 | 22 | 4 | 0 | 0 | 0 | 0 |
| | DF | (Australia) AUS | Peter Kotamanidis | 6 | 0 | 6 | 0 | 0 | 0 | 0 | 0 |
| | MF | (Australia) AUS | Steve Krishna | 2 | 0 | 1 | 0 | 0 | 0 | 1 | 0 |
| | DF | (Australia) AUS | Richard Lloyd | 18 | 0 | 17 | 0 | 0 | 0 | 1 | 0 |
| | MF | (Australia) AUS | Michael Lardis | 5 | 1 | 4 | 0 | 0 | 0 | 1 | 1 |
| | DF | (Australia) AUS | Jock Morlando | 20 | 1 | 20 | 1 | 0 | 0 | 0 | 0 |
| | MF | (Australia) AUS | Darren McEvoy | 11 | 0 | 10 | 0 | 0 | 0 | 1 | 0 |
| | MF | (England) ENG | Jeff Murphy | 17 | 0 | 16 | 0 | 0 | 0 | 1 | 0 |
| | FW | (Australia) AUS | Paul McFadden | 24 | 3 | 23 | 3 | 0 | 0 | 1 | 0 |
| | MF | (Australia) AUS | Derek O'Neill | 11 | 0 | 11 | 0 | 0 | 0 | 0 | 0 |
| | FW | (Australia) AUS | Danny Petkovic | 6 | 1 | 6 | 1 | 0 | 0 | 0 | 0 |
| | GK | (Australia) AUS | Dragan Pupovac | 15 | 0 | 14 | 0 | 0 | 0 | 1 | 0 |
| | DF | (England) ENG | David Ratcliffe | 24 | 0 | 24 | 0 | 0 | 0 | 0 | 0 |
| | MF | (Australia) AUS | David Roberts | 7 | 0 | 6 | 0 | 0 | 0 | 1 | 0 |
| | DF | (Australia) AUS | David Skeen | 23 | 2 | 23 | 2 | 0 | 0 | 0 | 0 |
| | DF | (Australia) AUS | Ray Vliestra | 21 | 0 | 21 | 0 | 0 | 0 | 0 | 0 |
| | MF | (Australia) AUS | Anthony Versi | 9 | 0 | 8 | 0 | 0 | 0 | 1 | 0 |
| | DF | (Australia) AUS | Richard Vidal | 1 | 0 | 0 | 0 | 0 | 0 | 1 | 0 |
| | | (Australia) AUS | Angelo Piacentin | 1 | 0 | 0 | 0 | 0 | 0 | 1 | 0 |

| Player | National Soccer League | NSL Finals | NSL Cup | Total |
|---|---|---|---|---|
| (Australia) Dragan Pupovac | 4 | 0 | 0 | 4 |
| (Australia) George Bouhoutsos | 2 | 0 | 0 | 2 |
| Total | 6 | 0 | 0 | 6 |

== See also ==
- List of Wollongong Wolves FC seasons
