= Johnny Warren Medal =

Australian soccer award

- Description: Annual award presented to the best player in the Australian national soccer club competition
- Country: Australia
- Presented by: Football Australia

The Johnny Warren Medal is awarded to the best player of the Australian national soccer club competition. It was first awarded in the National Soccer League in 1990, and upon the NSL's demise in November 2004, was carried forward into the new national club competition, the A-League. It is named after former Australia national soccer team captain and tireless promoter of soccer in Australia, Johnny Warren.

The medal was previously determined by the votes of current players after rounds 9, 18 and 27. The format was changed for the 2015-16 A-League season following consultation with all A-League clubs, the PFA and the Warren family.

For the 2015–16 A-League season to determine the medal a new four body panel was introduced that independently vote on a 3–2–1 basis after each regular season match, which is consolidated into a single 3–2–1 vote. The four body panel consists of:

1. A technical football expert;
2. A football media representative;
3. A former professional player representative; and
4. A combined vote from the match officials.

The eligible player(s) who receive the most votes for the regular season will determine the winner of the medal.

Since 2016 the award has been presented jointly with the Julie Dolan Medal at an event known as the Warren – Dolan Awards, where both A-League and W-League awards are presented.

== Eligibility ==
A player is ineligible to win the medal if they are:

- suspended as a result of receiving a direct red card in a match;
- suspended as a result of a determination of a body under the Hyundai A-League Disciplinary Regulations;
- convicted of an anti-doping offence;
- found guilty of serious misconduct;
- a Guest Player; and/or
- found guilty of breaching an FFA Statute.

== List of winners ==
=== NSL ===
Year	Player	Club	Ref.
1989–90	(Socialist Federal Republic of Yugoslavia) Željko Adžić	Melbourne Croatia	
1990–91	(Australia) Milan Ivanovic	Adelaide City	
1991–92	(Australia) Josip Biskic	Melbourne CSC	
1992–93	(Australia) Paul Trimboli	South Melbourne	
1993–94	(Australia) Mark Viduka	Melbourne Knights	
1994–95	(Australia) Mark Viduka	Melbourne Knights	
1995–96	(Australia) Damian Mori	Adelaide City	
1996–97	(Australia) Kresimir Marusic	Sydney United	
1997–98	(Australia) Paul Trimboli	South Melbourne	
1998–99	(Australia) Brad Maloney	Marconi-Fairfield	
1999–2000	(Australia) Scott Chipperfield	Wollongong Wolves	
2000–01	(Australia) Scott Chipperfield	Wollongong Wolves	
2001–02	(Brazil) Fernando Rech	Brisbane Strikers	
2002–03	(Australia) Damian Mori	Perth Glory	
2003–04	(Australia) Ante Milicic	Parramatta Power	

=== A-League ===
Year	Player	Club	Ref.
2005–06	(Australia) Bobby Despotovski	Perth Glory	
2006–07	(Australia) Nick Carle	Newcastle Jets	
2007–08	(Australia) Joel Griffiths	Newcastle Jets	
2008–09	(New Zealand) Shane Smeltz	Wellington Phoenix	
2009–10	(Costa Rica) Carlos Hernández	Melbourne Victory	
2010–11	(Argentina) Marcos Flores	Adelaide United	
2011–12	(Germany) Thomas Broich	Brisbane Roar	
2012–13	(New Zealand) Marco Rojas	Melbourne Victory	
2013–14	(Germany) Thomas Broich	Brisbane Roar	
2014–15	(Australia) Nathan Burns	Wellington Phoenix	
2015–16	(Spain) Diego Castro	Perth Glory	
2016–17	(Serbia) Miloš Ninković	Sydney FC	
2017–18	(Poland) Adrian Mierzejewski	Sydney FC	
2018–19	(Fiji) Roy Krishna	Wellington Phoenix	
2019–20	(Italy) Alessandro Diamanti	Western United	
2020–21	(Mexico) Ulises Dávila	Wellington Phoenix	
2020–21	(Serbia) Miloš Ninković	Sydney FC	
2021–22	(Australia) Jake Brimmer	Melbourne Victory	
2022–23	(Australia) Craig Goodwin	Adelaide United	
2023–24	(Australia) Josh Nisbet	Central Coast Mariners	
2024–25	(Australia) Nicolas Milanovic	Western Sydney Wanderers	
2025–26	(Spain) Juan Mata	Melbourne Victory	

== Multiple winners ==
The following players have won the Johnny Warren Medal multiple times.

Medals	Player	Team	Seasons
2	(Germany) Thomas Broich	Brisbane Roar	2011–12, 2013–14
2	(Australia) Scott Chipperfield	Wollongong Wolves	1999–00, 2000–01
2	(Australia) Damian Mori	Perth Glory, Adelaide City	1995–96, 2002–03
2	(Serbia) Miloš Ninković	Sydney FC	2016–17, 2020–21
2	(Australia) Paul Trimboli	South Melbourne	1992–93, 1997–98
2	(Australia) Mark Viduka	Melbourne Knights	1993–94, 1994–95

== See also ==
- John Kosmina Medal
- Joe Marston Medal
- Mark Viduka Medal
- Michael Cockerill Medal
