= 1989–90 NSL Cup =

National Soccer League Cup

Tournament details
- Country: Australia
- Dates: 7 February – 25 April 1990
- Teams: 14

Final positions
- Champions: South Melbourne (1st title)
- Runners-up: Sydney Olympic

Tournament statistics
- Matches played: 13
- Goals scored: 47 (3.62 per match)
- Attendance: 44,073 (3,390 per match)
- Top goal scorer(s): Abbas Saad; Kimon Taliadoros; Paul Trimboli (3 each)

The 1989–90 NSL Cup was the 14th edition of the NSL Cup, which was the main national association football knockout cup competition in Australia.

Adelaide City were the defending champions, having defeated Sydney Olympic to win their second title in the previous year's final, but they were eliminated in the semi-finals by eventual winners South Melbourne.

South Melbourne defeated Sydney Olympic 4–1 in the final to win their first NSL Cup title.

== Teams ==
The NSL Cup was a knockout competition with 14 teams taking part all trying to reach the Final in April 1990. The competition consisted of the 14 teams from the National Soccer League.

Round	Main date	Number of fixtures	Clubs remaining
First round	Wednesday 14 February 1990	6	14 → 8
Second round	Wednesday 21 March 1990	4	8 → 4
Semi-finals	Wednesday 11 April 1990	2	4 → 2
Final	Wednesday 25 April 1990	1	2 → 1

== First round ==
APIA Leichhardt and Blacktown City had a bye for the First round.

7 February 1990	Melbourne Croatia	1–0	Preston Makedonia	Melbourne
	Hannah 84'	Report		Stadium: Olympic Park; Attendance: 1,846; Referee: John Fraser

14 February 1990	Adelaide City	3–0	West Adelaide	Adelaide
	Maxwell 39'; Melta 88'; Veart 90'	Report		Stadium: Hindmarsh Stadium; Attendance: 10,000; Referee: Jim Rossis

14 February 1990	St George-Budapest	0–3	Sydney Croatia	Sydney
		Report	Batten 6'; Ricoy 28'; Grbevski 43'	Stadium: St George Stadium; Attendance: 1,523; Referee: Richard Lorenc

14 February 1990	South Melbourne	4–2	Sunshine George Cross	Melbourne
	Postecoglou 27'; Petersen 54'; Wade 56'; Taliadoros 76'	Report	Campelj 15'; Foster 73'	Stadium: Olympic Park; Attendance: 1,662; Referee: Dennis Voutsinas

14 February 1990	Sydney Olympic	4–1	Melita Eagles	Sydney
	Ironside 2'; Bennett 4'; Perinovic 40'; Bernal 84'	Report	Vial 47'	Stadium: St George Stadium; Attendance: 1,614; Referee: Manny Loupis

21 February 1990	Marconi Fairfield	2–1	Wollongong City	Sydney
	Glavovic 57'; van Egmond 89'	Report	Lardis 65'	Stadium: Marconi Stadium; Attendance: 1,553; Referee: Manny Loupis

== Second round ==
7 March 1990	South Melbourne	5–1	Blacktown City	Melbourne
	Postecoglou 22'; Trimboli 42', 66'; Wade 77'; Michalakopoulos 85'	Report	Northam 84'	Stadium: Olympic Park; Attendance: 1,413; Referee: John Fraser

8 March 1990	Adelaide City	2–1	Melbourne Croatia	Adelaide
	A. Vidmar 58'; Maxwell 68'	Report	Kelic 11'	Stadium: Hindmarsh Stadium; Attendance: 4,000; Referee: Tom McRoe

14 March 1990	Sydney Olympic	3–1	Sydney Croatia	Sydney
	Plataniotis 3'; Phillips 10'; Lee 23'	Report	Kupresak 38'	Stadium: St George Stadium; Attendance: 2,475; Referee: John McConnell

21 March 1990	Marconi Fairfield	0–2	APIA Leichhardt	Sydney
		Report	K. Okon 47'; Stewart 65'f	Stadium: Marconi Stadium; Attendance: 2,036; Referee: Richard Lorenc

== Semi-finals ==
11 April 1990	Adelaide City	0–1	South Melbourne	Adelaide
		Report	Tsolakis 63'	Stadium: Hindmarsh Stadium; Attendance: 5,700; Referee: John McConnell

11 April 1990	Sydney Olympic	4–1	APIA Leichhardt	Sydney
	Edwards 28'; Saad 35', 63', 68'	Report	Murray 40'	Stadium: Marconi Stadium; Attendance: 1,461; Referee: John Fraser

== Final ==
25 April 1990
19:00 AEST

South Melbourne	4–1	Sydney Olympic
Taliadoros 21'; Petersen 71'; Trimboli 72' (pen.); Tsolakis 84'	Report	Edwards 27'

Olympic Park, Melbourne
Attendance: 8,790
Referee: John Santa Isabel
