= 1989 NSL Cup final =

- Event: 1989 NSL Cup
Adelaide City	Sydney Olympic
2	0
- Date: 20 August 1989
- Venue: Hindmarsh Stadium, Adelaide
- Referee: Don Campbell
- Attendance: 10,000

The 1989 NSL Cup final was the final match of the 1989 NSL Cup, the 13th season of the National Soccer League Cup. It was played at Hindmarsh Stadium in Adelaide on 20 August 1989 between Adelaide City and Sydney Olympic. Adelaide City won the match 2–0 for their second NSL Cup title.

== Route to the final ==
Adelaide City		Round	Sydney Olympic	
Opposition	Score	Round	Opposition	Score
Bye		R1	St George-Budapest (A)	6–3
Sunshine George Cross (H)	4–0	R2	Marconi Fairfield (A)	3–1
South Melbourne (A)	2–0	SF	APIA Leichhardt (H)	1–0
Key: (H) = Home venue; (A) = Away venue

== Match ==
=== Details ===
20 August 1989

Adelaide City	2–0	Sydney Olympic
Maxwell 25'; Vidmar 40'	Report

Hindmarsh Stadium, Adelaide
Attendance: 10,000
Referee: Don Campbell

GK	(Australia) Robert Zabica
DF	(Australia) Paul Schillabeer
DF	(Australia) Milan Ivanovic
DF	(England) Neville Flounders
DF	(Australia) Alex Tobin
DF	(Australia) Tony Vidmar
MF	(Australia) Sergio Melta
MF	(Australia) Adrian Santrac
FW	(Australia) Aurelio Vidmar
FW	(Australia) Joe Mullen
FW	(Australia) Steve Maxwell
Head Coach:
(Socialist Federal Republic of Yugoslavia) Zoran Matić

GK	(Australia) Gary Meier
DF	(Australia) David Barrett
DF	(Australia) Robert Hooker
DF	(Australia) Andy Bernal
DF	(Australia) Steve Georgakis
DF	(Australia) John Koch	(substituted off) 67'
MF	(Australia) Gary Phillips
MF	(New Zealand) Robert Ironside
MF	(Australia) Grant Lee
FW	(Australia) Abbas Saad
FW	(Australia) Alistair Edwards
Substitutes:
MF	(Australia) Tony Spyridakos	(substituted on) 67'
Head Coach:
(Australia) Eddie Thomson

Match rules

- 90 minutes
- 30 minutes of extra time if necessary
- Penalty shoot-out if scores still level
