= 1990 NSL Cup final =

- Event: 1989–90 NSL Cup
| South Melbourne | Sydney Olympic |
| 4 | 1 |
- Date: 25 April 1990
- Venue: Olympic Park, Melbourne
- Referee: John Santa Isabel
- Attendance: 8,790

The 1990 NSL Cup final was the final match of the 1989–90 NSL Cup, the 14th season of the National Soccer League Cup. It was played at Olympic Park in Melbourne on 25 April 1990 between South Melbourne and Sydney Olympic. South Melbourne won the match 4–1 for their first NSL Cup title.

== Route to the final ==
| South Melbourne | | Round | Sydney Olympic | |
| Opposition | Score | Round | Opposition | Score |
|---|---|---|---|---|
| Sunshine George Cross (H) | 4–2 | R1 | Melita Eagles (H) | 4–1 |
| Blacktown City (H) | 5–1 | R2 | Sydney Croatia (H) | 3–1 |
| Adelaide City (A) | 1–0 | SF | APIA Leichhardt (H) | 4–1 |
Key: (H) = Home venue; (A) = Away venue

== Match ==
=== Details ===
25 April 1990
19:00 AEST

| South Melbourne | 4–1 | Sydney Olympic |
|---|---|---|
| Taliadoros 21'; Petersen 71'; Trimboli 72' (pen.); Tsolakis 84' | Report | Edwards 27' |

Olympic Park, Melbourne
Attendance: 8,790
Referee: John Santa Isabel

| GK | 1 | (Australia) Bruce Maclaren |
| DF | 2 | (Australia) David Healy |
| DF | 3 | (Australia) Ange Postecoglou |
| DF | 4 | (Australia) Mehmet Duraković |
| DF | 5 | (Australia) Steve Blair |
| MF | 6 | (Australia) Paul Wade |
| FW | 8 | (Australia) Mike Petersen |
| FW | 10 | (Australia) Danny Wright | (substituted off) 84' |
| FW | 11 | (Australia) Peter Tsolakis |
| FW | 9 | (Australia) Paul Trimboli |
| FW | 7 | (Australia) Kimon Taliadoros |
Substitutes:
| FW | 13 | (Australia) Joe Palatsides | (substituted on) 84' |
Head Coach:
(Hungary) Ferenc Puskás

| GK | 1 | (New Zealand) Clint Gosling |
| DF | 2 | (Australia) David Barrett |
| DF | 4 | (Australia) Robert Hooker |
| DF | 12 | (Australia) Andy Bernal |
| DF | 14 | (Australia) Tony Spyridakos |
| MF | 7 | (Australia) Grant Lee |
| MF | 6 | (Australia) Gary Phillips |
| MF | 10 | (New Zealand) Robert Ironside |
| MF | 11 | (Australia) Steve Refenes | (substituted off) 82' |
| FW | 9 | (Australia) Abbas Saad |
| FW | 13 | (Australia) Alistair Edwards |
Substitutes:
| FW | 8 | (Australia) Marko Perinovic | (substituted on) 82' |
Head Coach:
(Australia) Mick Hickman

Match rules

- 90 minutes
- 30 minutes of extra time if necessary
- Penalty shoot-out if scores still level
