= 1995–96 Bristol City F.C. season =

Bristol City
1995–96 season
- Chairman: David Russe (Until March 1996); Scott Davidson (From March 1996)
- Manager: Joe Jordan
- Stadium: Ashton Gate
- Second Division: 13th
- FA Cup: First round
- League Cup: Second round
- Football League Trophy: Southern Area 2nd Round
- Top goalscorer: League: David Seal & Paul Agostino (10); All: David Seal (14)

During the 1993–94 season, Bristol City competed in the Football League Second Division, in which they finished 13th.

== Second Division ==
=== League table ===
Pos	Team	Pld	W	D	L	GF	GA	GD	Pts
11	Walsall	46	19	12	15	60	45	+15	69
12	Wycombe Wanderers	46	15	15	16	63	59	+4	60
13	Bristol City	46	15	15	16	55	60	−5	60
14	Bournemouth	46	16	10	20	51	70	−19	58
15	Brentford	46	15	13	18	43	49	−6	58

== Results ==
Bristol City's score comes first

=== Legend ===
Win	Draw	Loss

=== Football League First Division ===
Date	Opponent	Venue	Result	Attendance	Scorers
12 August 1995	Blackpool	H	1–1	7,617	Seal
26 August 1995	Stockport County	H	1–0	7,331	Seal
29 August 1995	Shrewsbury Town	A	1–4	2,558	Agostino
2 September 1995	Peterborough United	A	1–1	4,621	Seal
9 September 1995	Brighton & Hove Albion	H	0–1	7,585	
12 September 1995	Brentford	H	0–0	5,054	
16 September 1995	Bradford City	A	0–3	5,165	
23 September 1995	Notts County	A	2–2	5,251	Agostino, Seal
30 September 1995	Wycombe Wanderers	H	0–0	5,564	
7 October 1995	Swindon Town	A	0–2	12,378	
14 October 1995	Hull City	H	4–0	5,354	Bent (2), Starbuck, Barnard
21 October 1995	York City	A	1–0	3,367	Nugent
28 October 1995	Walsall	H	0–2	6,475	
31 October 1995	Chesterfield	H	2–1	4,408	Barnard, Own goal
4 November 1995	Oxford United	A	0–2	5,665	
18 November 1995	Carlisle United	H	1–1	5,423	Nugent
25 November 1995	Rotherham United	A	3–2	2,649	Barnard, Owers, Seal
5 December 1995	Crewe Alexandra	A	2–4	2,977	Nugent, Dryden
9 December 1995	Notts County	H	0–2	5,617	
16 December 1995	Wycombe Wanderers	A	1–1	4,020	Tinnion
23 December 1995	Burnley	A	0–0	9,327	
26 December 1995	Swansea City	H	1–0	6,845	Kuhl
6 January 1996	AFC Bournemouth	A	1–1	3,667	Maskell
13 January 1996	Crewe Alexandra	H	3–2	6,790	Nugent (2), Paterson
16 January 1996	Bristol Rovers	H	0–2	20,007	
20 January 1996	Blackpool	A	0–3	4,838	
23 January 1996	Wrexham	A	0–0	2,673	
10 February 1996	AFC Bournemouth	H	3–0	6,217	Seal, Tinnion, Agostino
13 February 1996	Shrewsbury Town	H	2–0	5,269	Agostino (2)
17 February 1996	Brentford	A	2–2	5,213	Agostino, Barnard
20 February 1996	Peterborough United	H	0–1	5,014	
24 February 1996	Bradford City	H	2–1	5,400	Seal, Kuhl
27 February 1996	Brighton & Hove Albion	A	2–0	4,379	Kuhl (2)
2 March 1996	Swansea City	A	1–2	4,109	Own goal
9 March 1996	Burnley	H	0–1	6,612	
16 March 1996	Bristol Rovers	A	4–2	8,622	Nugent, Hewlett, Agostino, Seal
19 March 1996	Stockport County	A	0–0	3,713	
23 March 1996	Wrexham	H	3–1	6,141	Nugent (2), Tinnion
30 March 1996	Swindon Town	H	0–0	11,370	
2 April 1996	Hull City	A	3–2	2,641	Hewlett, Agostino, Seal
6 April 1996	Walsall	A	1–2	4,142	Seal
8 April 1996	York City	H	1–1	7,512	Kuhl (pen)
13 April 1996	Chesterfield	A	1–1	4,619	Owers
20 April 1996	Oxford United	H	0–2	7,674	
27 April 1996	Rotherham United	H	4–3	6,101	Agostino (2), Partridge, Kuhl
4 May 1996	Carlisle United	A	1–2	5,925	Own goal

=== FA Cup ===
Round	Date	Opponent	Venue	Result	Attendance	Goalscorers
R1	11 November 1995	AFC Bournemouth	A	0–0	5,304	
R1 Replay	21 November 1995	AFC Bournemouth	H	0–1	5,069	

=== League Cup ===
Round	Date	Opponent	Venue	Result	Attendance	Goalscorers
R1 1st Leg	15 August 1995	Colchester United	A	1–2	5,069	Seal
R1 2nd Leg	22 August 1995	Colchester United	H	2–1 (5–3 p)	3,648	Seal (2)
R2 1st Leg	19 September 1995	Newcastle United	H	0–5	15,592	
R2 2nd Leg	4 October 1995	Newcastle United	A	1–3	36,357	Agostino

=== Football League Trophy ===
Round	Date	Opponent	Venue	Result	Attendance	Goalscorers
Round 1	26 September 1995	Oxford United	A	0–3	2,557	
Round 1	17 October 1995	Barnet	H	2–0	1,830	Seal (pen), Edwards
Round 2	28 November 1995	Shrewsbury Town	A	0–0 (6–7 p)	2,258	

== Squad ==
Note: Flags indicate national team as defined under FIFA eligibility rules; some limited exceptions apply. Players may hold more than one non-FIFA nationality.

No.	Pos.	Nation	Player
-	GK	ENG	Keith Welch
-	GK	ENG	Phil Kite
-	DF	WAL	Darren Barnard
-	DF	NOR	Vegard Hansen
-	DF	ENG	Alan McLeary
-	DF	WAL	Rob Edwards
-	DF	SCO	Louis Carey
-	DF	SCO	Stuart Munro
-	DF	SWE	Mark Shail
-	DF	ENG	Matt Bryant
-	DF	ENG	Richard Dryden
-	DF	SCO	Scott Paterson
-	MF	ENG	Brian Tinnion
-	MF	ENG	Martin Kuhl
-	MF	ENG	Gary Owers

No.	Pos.	Nation	Player
-	MF	ENG	Matt Hewlett
-	FW	ENG	Junior Bent
-	FW	ENG	Kevin Nugent
-	FW	AUS	David Seal
-	FW	AUS	Paul Agostino
-	FW	ENG	Scott Partridge
-	GK	NED	Sieb Dijkstra (on loan from Queens Park Rangers)
-	MF	ENG	Phil Starbuck (on loan from Sheffield United)
-	FW	ENG	Craig Maskell (on loan from Southampton)
