= Milan Ivanović =

Australian international soccer player

Personal information
- Date of birth: 21 December 1960 (age 65)
- Place of birth: Sivac, FPR Yugoslavia
- Position: Sweeper

Senior career*
Years	Team	Apps	(Gls)
1978–1979	Crvenka		
1979–1982	Rudar Kostolac		
1982–1985	OFK Belgrade	95	(9)
1985–1989	Red Star Belgrade	25	(0)
1986–1988	→ Radnički Niš (loan)	59	(0)
1989–2000	Adelaide City	300	(2)
1994	→ White City Woodville (loan)	1	(0)
1996	→ Campbelltown City (loan)	9	(0)
1998	→ White City Woodville (loan)	13	(0)
2007	Northern Demons	2	(0)
Total		504	(11)

International career
1991–1998	Australia	59	(0)
Medal record
Representing Australia
Men's Association football
FIFA Confederations Cup
Runner-up	1997 Saudi Arabia
OFC Nations Cup
Winner	1996 Oceania
- * Club domestic league appearances and goals

Milan Ivanović (Serbian Cyrillic: Милан Ивановић, pronounced [mǐlan iʋǎːnoʋit͡ɕ]; born 21 December 1960) is a former soccer player who played as a sweeper. Born in Yugoslavia, he played for the Australia national team.

== Club career ==
Ivanović started his career with a local club Crvenka. After stints with Rudar Kostolac and OFK Belgrade, he joined Red Star Belgrade in 1985. Ivanović played in a 1988 European Cup encounter against A.C. Milan.

He emigrated to Australia and on arrival in 1989 he joined Adelaide City in the National Soccer League. Nicknamed "The Doctor" for his ability to cut out the opposition's attacks and launch into an incisive midfield run, the classy, composed sweeper formed a formidable partnership with Alex Tobin that became the mainstay of the Adelaide City and Socceroo defence. That resulted in two national titles in 1992 and 1994, cementing his legendary status.

In 2007, Ivanović came out of retirement to play in the South Australian Premier League club, Northern Demons.

== International career ==
Ivanović made his first international appearance for Australia in a January 1991 friendly match against Czechoslovakia. He captained Australia once, in a match against Japan on 15 February 1998, which was also his last appearance for Australia. Ivanović made 59 international appearances for Australia and represented them in 71 games including unofficial ones.

In 2000, he was selected as a member of the Australian "Team of the Century" by respondents to a worldwide Rec.Sport.Soccer Statistics Foundation vote, beating Paul Okon into second place for a position in central defense.

== Managerial career ==
Ivanović has coached at local level in South Australia, in both Federation and Amateur leagues. He has been in charge at both Enfield City and White City and saved the latter club from relegation in 2006. Currently coaching U/19's at Croydon Kings (Polonia) Soccer Club in South Australia. He is now currently the head soccer coach at Scotch College Adelaide.

== Honours ==
Adelaide City:

- National Soccer League: 1991–1992, 1993–1994
- NSL Cup: 1989, 1991–1992

Australia

- FIFA Confederations Cup: runner-up, 1997
- OFC Nations Cup: 1996

Personal honours:

- FFA Hall of Fame Inductee - 2003
- Johnny Warren Medal: 1990–1991 with Adelaide City
- Joe Marston Medal: 1992–1993 with Adelaide City
- RSSSF Australian Team of the Century: 2000
