= A-League Men Golden Boot =

- Awarded for: The leading goalscorer in a given A-League season.
- Country: Australia
- Presented by: Australian Professional Leagues
- First award: 2006
- Final award: 2026
- Currently held by: Sam Cosgrove and Luka Jovanović

Highlights
- Most awards: Jamie Maclaren 5

The A-League Men Golden Boot is an annual association football award presented to the leading goalscorer in the A-League Men. It was previously referred to as the Nike Golden Boot for sponsorship purposes.

The A-League was founded in 2005 to replace the semi-professional National Soccer League. The number of teams in the league has ranged from eight to twelve and there are currently twelve clubs in the league. The award is given to the top-scorer over the regular season (not including the finals series). The inaugural award was shared by four players: Alex Brosque, Bobby Despotovski, Stewart Petrie and Archie Thompson.

Jamie Maclaren has won the golden boot on five occasions, more than any other player. Petrie was the first non-Australian winner in the league's inaugural season.

Bobô – with 27 goals in 2017–18 – scored the most goals to win the Golden Boot, while Danny Allsopp scored the fewest to win the award outright, with 11 goals in 2006–07. The all-time record for lowest number of goals scored to be bestowed the award, however, is 8 goals; this was achieved during the 2005–06 season, when the award was shared among four players. This marks one of two seasons in which the award has been shared, the other being the 2016–17 season, where the award was shared between Jamie Maclaren and Besart Berisha. Bobô recorded the highest goals-to-games ratio to win the award, scoring 27 goals in 27 games in 2017–18 for a rate of 1.00.

In 2024, Adam Taggart became the first ever player in the Australian top flight to win the Golden Boot from a team that finished bottom, scoring 20 goals in 25 games for Perth Glory.

In 2025, Archie Goodwin became the youngest ever A-League golden boot winner, at 20 years and 178 days, eclipsing Adam Taggart from the 2013/14 season.

== Winners ==
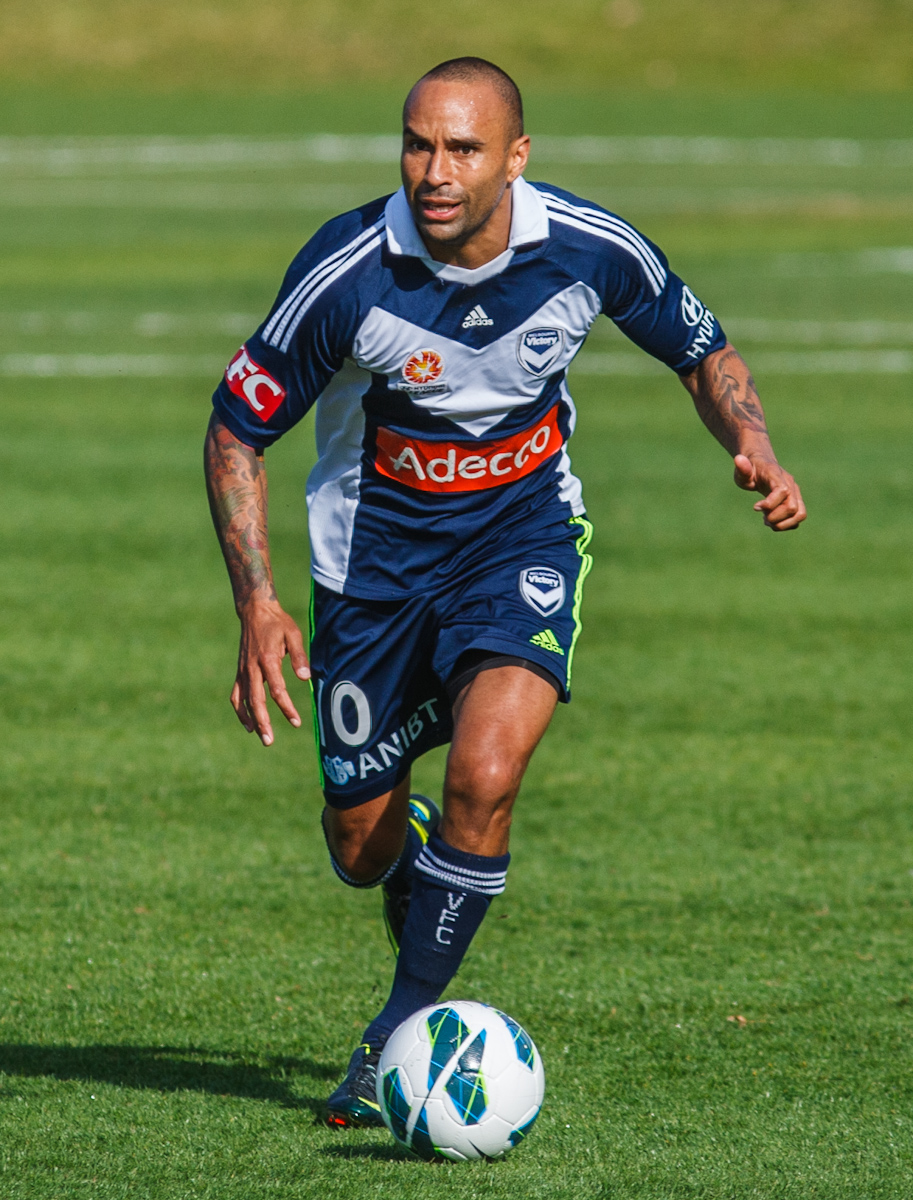
Archie Thompson was one of four winners of the inaugural A-League Golden Boot in 2006.

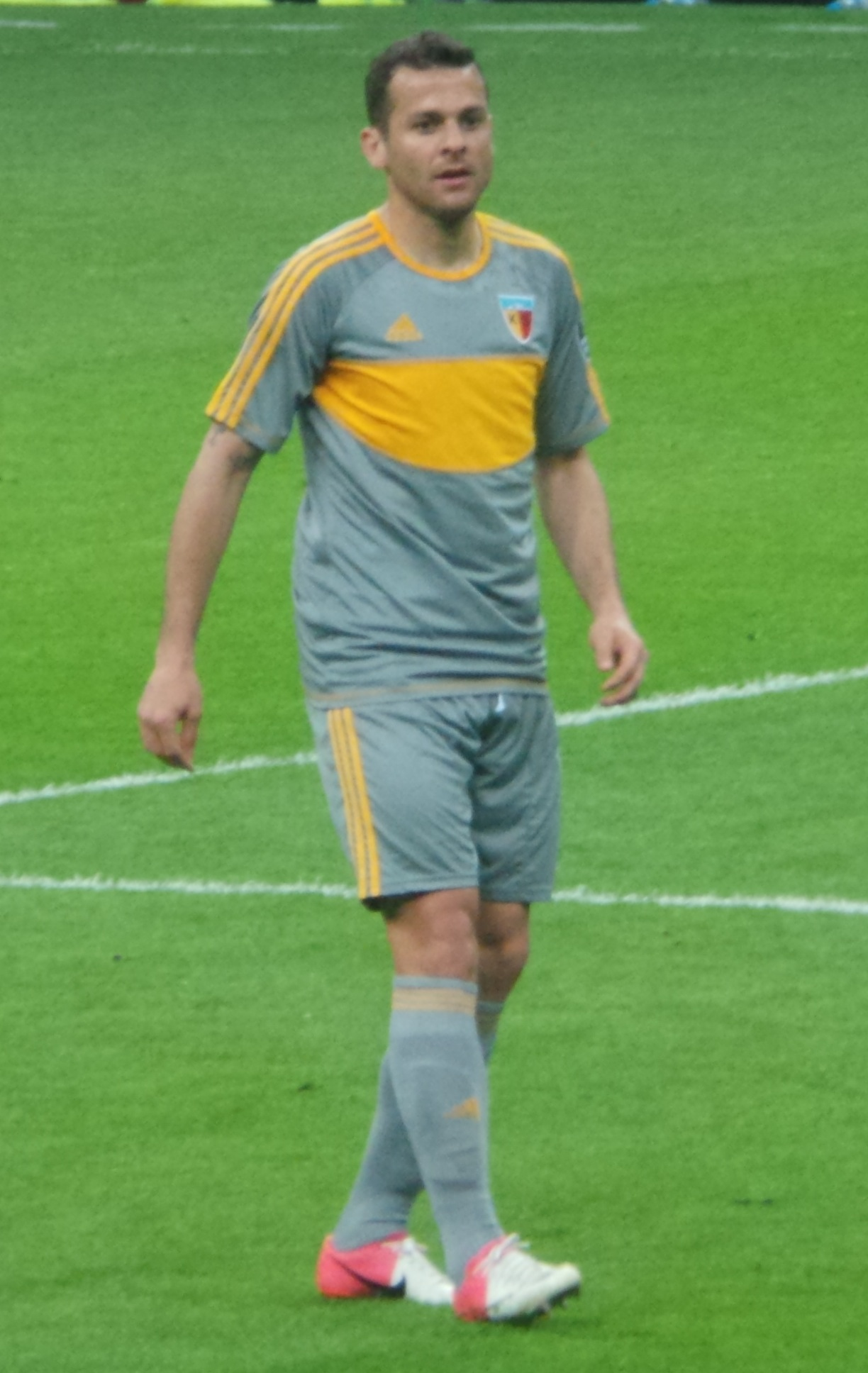
Bobô won the 2017–18 A-League Golden Boot, scoring 27 goals in 27 games for a rate of 1.00; he holds the record for the most goals scored in a single season.

Key
Player (X)	Name of the player and number of times they had won the award at that point (if more than one)
Games	The number of A-League regular season games played by the winner that season (Note: This does not necessarily match the total number of games in a season.)
Rate	The winner's goals-to-games ratio that regular season
§	Denotes the club were A-League premiers in the same season

Season	Player	Nationality	Club	Goals	Games	Rate	Ref(s)
2005–06	Archie Thompson	Australia	Melbourne Victory	8	15	0.53	
2005–06	Bobby Despotovski	Australia	Perth Glory	8	19	0.42	
2005–06	Stewart Petrie	Scotland	Central Coast Mariners	8	19	0.42	
2005–06	Alex Brosque	Australia	Queensland Roar	8	21	0.38	
2006–07	Danny Allsopp	Australia	Melbourne Victory^{§}	11	20	0.55	
2007–08	Joel Griffiths	Australia	Newcastle Jets	12	19	0.63	
2008–09	Shane Smeltz	New Zealand	Wellington Phoenix	12	20	0.60	
2009–10	Shane Smeltz (2)	New Zealand	Gold Coast United	19	25	0.76	
2010–11	Sergio van Dijk	Indonesia	Adelaide United	16	28	0.57	
2011–12	Besart Berisha	Albania	Brisbane Roar	19	26	0.73	
2012–13	Daniel McBreen	Australia	Central Coast Mariners	17	25	0.68	
2013–14	Adam Taggart	Australia	Newcastle Jets	16	25	0.64	
2014–15	Marc Janko	Austria	Sydney FC	16	22	0.73	
2015–16	Bruno Fornaroli	Uruguay	Melbourne City	23	27	0.85	
2016–17	Besart Berisha (2)	Kosovo	Melbourne Victory	19	26	0.73	
2016–17	Jamie Maclaren	Australia	Brisbane Roar	19	26	0.73	
2017–18	Bobô	Brazil	Sydney FC^{§}	27	27	1.00	
2018–19	Roy Krishna	Fiji	Wellington Phoenix	18	26	0.69	
2019–20	Jamie Maclaren (2)	Australia	Melbourne City	22	23	0.96	
2020–21	Jamie Maclaren (3)	Australia	Melbourne City^{§}	25	24	1.04	
2021–22	Jamie Maclaren (4)	Australia	Melbourne City^{§}	15	24	0.63	
2022–23	Jamie Maclaren (5)	Australia	Melbourne City^{§}	24	26	0.92	
2023–24	Adam Taggart (2)	Australia	Perth Glory	20	25	0.80	
2024–25	Archie Goodwin	Australia	Adelaide United	13	23	0.56	
2024–25	Adrian Segecic	Australia	Sydney FC	13	24	0.54	
2025–26	Luka Jovanovic	Australia	Adelaide United	11	23	0.47	
2025–26	Sam Cosgrove	England	Auckland FC	11	25	0.44	

== Awards won by club ==
Club	Total
Melbourne City	5
Adelaide United	3
Brisbane Roar	3
Melbourne Victory	3
Sydney FC	3
Central Coast Mariners	2
Newcastle Jets	2
Perth Glory	2
Wellington Phoenix	2
Auckland FC	1
Gold Coast United	1

== See also ==
- A-League Men records and statistics
- A-League Women Golden Boot
- List of top National Soccer League goal scorers by season
