= 2001–02 Leeds United A.F.C. season =

2001–02 season of Leeds United

Leeds United
2001–02 season
- Chairman: Peter Ridsdale
- Manager: David O'Leary
- Stadium: Elland Road
- Premier League: 5th
- FA Cup: Third round
- League Cup: Fourth round
- UEFA Cup: Fourth round
- Top goalscorer: League: Robbie Fowler; Mark Viduka (12 each); All: Mark Viduka (17)
- Highest home attendance: 40,287 vs. Newcastle United (22 December 2001, Premier League)
- Lowest home attendance: 33,841 vs. Chelsea (28 November 2001, League Cup)
- Average home league attendance: 39,460

The 2001–02 season saw Leeds United competing in the Premier League (known as the FA Barclaycard Premiership for sponsorship reasons) and the UEFA Cup.

== Competitions ==
=== Premier League ===
==== League table ====
Pos	Team	Pld	W	D	L	GF	GA	GD	Pts	Qualification or relegation
3	Manchester United	38	24	5	9	87	45	+42	77	Qualification for the Champions League third qualifying round
4	Newcastle United	38	21	8	9	74	52	+22	71	Qualification for the Champions League third qualifying round
5	Leeds United	38	18	12	8	53	37	+16	66	Qualification for the UEFA Cup first round (Note: Since Arsenal qualified for the Champions League, their UEFA Cup place as FA Cup winners defaulted to Chelsea, the losing finalists.)
6	Chelsea	38	17	13	8	66	38	+28	64	Qualification for the UEFA Cup first round
7	West Ham United	38	15	8	15	48	57	−9	53	

Source: Premier League
Rules for classification: 1) points; 2) goal difference; 3) number of goals scored.

==== Results summary ====
Overall								Home						Away					
Pld	W	D	L	GF	GA	GD	Pts	W	D	L	GF	GA	GD	W	D	L	GF	GA	GD
38	18	12	8	53	37	+16	66	9	6	4	31	21	+10	9	6	4	22	16	+6

Source: Statto

==== Results by round ====
Round	1	2	3	4	5	6	7	8	9	10	11	12	13	14	15	16	17	18	19	20	21	22	23	24	25	26	27	28	29	30	31	32	33	34	35	36	37	38
Ground	H	A	A	H	A	H	A	A	H	A	H	A	H	A	A	H	H	H	A	A	H	A	H	A	H	A	H	A	H	H	A	H	A	H	A	H	A	H
Result	W	W	D	D	W	W	W	D	D	D	W	L	D	D	W	D	W	L	W	W	W	L	D	L	L	D	D	D	W	W	W	L	L	W	W	L	W	W
Position	3	2	2	3	1	1	1	1	1	2	1	2	2	3	3	4	3	3	4	3	1	2	3	5	6	6	6	5	5	6	5	6	6	6	6	6	6	5

Source: Statto.com
A = Away; H = Home; W = Win; D = Draw; L = Loss

==== Matches ====
18 August 2001 1	Leeds United	2–0	Southampton	Leeds
	Bowyer 67'; Smith 81'	Report		Stadium: Elland Road; Attendance: 39,715; Referee: Clive Wilkes

21 August 2001 2	Arsenal	1–2	Leeds United	Islington
	Wiltord 32'	Report	Harte 29'; Viduka 53'	Stadium: Highbury; Attendance: 38,062; Referee: Jeff Winter

25 August 2001 3	West Ham United	0–0	Leeds United	Newham
		Report		Stadium: Boleyn Ground; Attendance: 24,517; Referee: Paul Durkin

8 September 2001 4	Leeds United	0–0	Bolton Wanderers	Leeds
		Report		Stadium: Elland Road; Attendance: 40,153; Referee: Steve Bennett

16 September 2001 5	Charlton Athletic	0–2	Leeds United	Greenwich
		Report	Keane 21'; Mills 62'	Stadium: The Valley; Attendance: 20,451; Referee: Mark Halsey

23 September 2001 6	Leeds United	3–0	Derby County	Leeds
	Bakke 9'; Kewell 74', 78'	Report		Stadium: Elland Road; Attendance: 39,155; Referee: Alan Wiley

30 September 2001 7	Ipswich Town	1–2	Leeds United	Ipswich
	Stewart 22'	Report	Keane 70'; Venus 86' (o.g.)	Stadium: Portman Road; Attendance: 22,643; Referee: Andy D'Urso

13 October 2001 8	Liverpool	1–1	Leeds United	Liverpool
	Murphy 69'	Report	Kewell 27'	Stadium: Anfield; Attendance: 44,352; Referee: Alan Wiley

21 October 2001 9	Leeds United	0–0	Chelsea	Leeds
		Report		Stadium: Elland Road; Attendance: 40,171; Referee: Paul Durkin

27 October 2001 10	Manchester United	1–1	Leeds United	Manchester
	Solskjær 89'	Report	Viduka 77'	Stadium: Old Trafford; Attendance: 67,555; Referee: Dermot Gallagher

4 November 2001 11	Leeds United	2–1	Tottenham Hotspur	Leeds
	Harte 61'; Kewell 82'	Report	Poyet 52'	Stadium: Elland Road; Attendance: 40,203; Referee: Steve Bennett

18 November 2001 12	Sunderland	2–0	Leeds United	Sunderland
	Arca 48'; Phillips 55'	Report		Stadium: Stadium of Light; Attendance: 48,005; Referee: Graham Barber

25 November 2001 13	Leeds United	1–1	Aston Villa	Leeds
	Smith 18'	Report	Kachloul 35'	Stadium: Elland Road; Attendance: 40,159; Referee: Neale Barry

2 December 2001 14	Fulham	0–0	Leeds United	Fulham
		Report		Stadium: Craven Cottage; Attendance: 20,918; Referee: Graham Poll

9 December 2001 15	Blackburn Rovers	1–2	Leeds United	Blackburn
	Berg 83'	Report	Kewell 55', 62'	Stadium: Ewood Park; Attendance: 28,309; Referee: Andy D'Urso

16 December 2001 16	Leeds United	2–2	Leicester City	Leeds
	Kewell 7'; Viduka 58'	Report	Deane 78'; Scowcroft 88'	Stadium: Elland Road; Attendance: 38,337; Referee: Rob Styles

19 December 2001 17	Leeds United	3–2	Everton	Leeds
	Viduka 18'; Fowler 26', 70'	Report	Moore 86'; Weir 90'	Stadium: Elland Road; Attendance: 40,201; Referee: Peter Jones

22 December 2001 18	Leeds United	3–4	Newcastle United	Leeds
	Bowyer 38'; Viduka 50'; Harte 56'	Report	Bellamy 38'; Elliott 59'; Shearer 71' (pen.); Solano 90'	Stadium: Elland Road; Attendance: 40,287; Referee: Jeff Winter

26 December 2001 19	Bolton Wanderers	0–3	Leeds United	Bolton
		Report	Fowler 2', 16', 89'	Stadium: Reebok Stadium; Attendance: 27,060; Referee: Alan Wiley

29 December 2001 20	Southampton	0–1	Leeds United	Southampton
		Report	Bowyer 89'	Stadium: St. Mary's Stadium; Attendance: 31,622; Referee: Mark Halsey

1 January 2002 21	Leeds United	3–0	West Ham United	Leeds
	Viduka 4', 7'; Fowler 50'	Report		Stadium: Elland Road; Attendance: 39,320; Referee: Steve Dunn

12 January 2002 22	Newcastle United	3–1	Leeds United	Newcastle
	Duberry 44' (o.g.); Dyer 60'; Bellamy 87'	Report	Smith 1'	Stadium: St. James' Park; Attendance: 52,130; Referee: Graham Barber

20 January 2002 23	Leeds United	1–1	Arsenal	Leeds
	Fowler 6'	Report	Pires 47'	Stadium: Elland Road; Attendance: 40,143; Referee: Mark Halsey

30 January 2002 24	Chelsea	2–0	Leeds United	Fulham
	Guðjohnsen 2'; Dalla Bona 31'	Report		Stadium: Stamford Bridge; Attendance: 40,614; Referee: Steve Bennett

3 February 2002 25	Leeds United	0–4	Liverpool	Leeds
		Report	Ferdinand 16' (o.g.); Heskey 61', 63'; Owen 90'	Stadium: Elland Road; Attendance: 40,216; Referee: Graham Poll

9 February 2002 26	Middlesbrough	2–2	Leeds United	Middlesbrough
	Ince 51'; Windass 88'	Report	Bakke 19'; Fowler 54'	Stadium: Riverside Stadium; Attendance: 30,221; Referee: Neale Barry

24 February 2002 27	Leeds United	0–0	Charlton Athletic	Leeds
		Report		Stadium: Elland Road; Attendance: 39,374; Referee: Mike Dean

3 March 2002 28	Everton	0–0	Leeds United	Liverpool
		Report		Stadium: Goodison Park; Attendance: 33,226; Referee: Andy D'Urso

6 March 2002 29	Leeds United	2–0	Ipswich Town	Leeds
	Fowler 46'; Harte 76' (pen.)	Report		Stadium: Elland Road; Attendance: 39,414; Referee: Dermot Gallagher

17 March 2002 30	Leeds United	3–1	Blackburn Rovers	Leeds
	Fowler 5', 8'; Kewell 71'	Report	Jansen 49'	Stadium: Elland Road; Attendance: 39,857; Referee: Graham Poll

23 March 2002 31	Leicester City	0–2	Leeds United	Leicester
		Report	Viduka 18'; Fowler 31'	Stadium: Filbert Street; Attendance: 18,976; Referee: Steve Dunn

30 March 2002 32	Leeds United	3–4	Manchester United	Leeds
	Viduka 20'; Harte 62'; Bowyer 80'	Report	Scholes 8'; Solskjær 37', 39'; Giggs 55'	Stadium: Elland Road; Attendance: 40,058; Referee: David Elleray

1 April 2002 33	Tottenham Hotspur	2–1	Leeds United	Haringey
	Iversen 10'; Sheringham 29'	Report	Viduka 52'	Stadium: White Hart Lane; Attendance: 35,167; Referee: Uriah Rennie

7 April 2002 34	Leeds United	2–0	Sunderland	Leeds
	Craddock 8' (o.g.); Keane 83'	Report		Stadium: Elland Road; Attendance: 39,195; Referee: Peter Jones

13 April 2002 35	Aston Villa	0–1	Leeds United	Birmingham
		Report	Viduka 29'	Stadium: Villa Park; Attendance: 40,039; Referee: Barry Knight

20 April 2002 36	Leeds United	0–1	Fulham	Leeds
		Report	Malbranque 52'	Stadium: Elland Road; Attendance: 39,111; Referee: Rob Styles

27 April 2002 37	Derby County	0–1	Leeds United	Derby
		Report	Bowyer 16'	Stadium: Pride Park Stadium; Attendance: 30,075; Referee: Graham Poll

11 May 2002 38	Leeds United	1–0	Middlesbrough	Leeds
	Smith 63'	Report		Stadium: Elland Road; Attendance: 40,218; Referee: Uriah Rennie

=== FA Cup ===
6 January 2002 3	Cardiff City	2–1	Leeds United	Cardiff
	Kavanagh 21'; Young 87'	Report	Viduka 12'	Stadium: Ninian Park; Attendance: 22,009; Referee: Andy D'Urso

=== League Cup ===
9 October 2001 3	Leicester City	0–6	Leeds United	Leicester
		Report	Keane 12', 16', 53'; Bakke 40'; Viduka 56'; Kewell 64'	Stadium: Filbert Street; Attendance: 16,316; Referee: Graham Poll

28 November 2001 4	Leeds United	0–2	Chelsea	Leeds
		Report	Guðjohnsen 59', 80'	Stadium: Elland Road; Attendance: 33,841; Referee: Jeff Winter

=== UEFA Cup ===
==== First round ====
20 September 2001	Marítimo	1–0	Leeds United	Funchal
	Bruno 34'	Report		Stadium: Estádio do Marítimo; Attendance: 10,500; Referee: Jack Van Hulten (Netherlands)

27 September 2001	Leeds United	3–0	Marítimo	Leeds
	Keane 20'; Kewell 37'; Bakke 62'	Report		Stadium: Elland Road; Attendance: 38,125; Referee: Stefano Faria (Italy)

==== Second round ====
18 October 2001	Leeds United	4–2	Troyes	Leeds
	Viduka 6', 43'; Bowyer 23', 46'	Report	Loko 31', 81'	Stadium: Elland Road; Attendance: 40,015; Referee: Fernando Carmona Mendez (Spain)

1 November 2001	Troyes	3–2	Leeds United	Troyes
	Amzine 8'; Hamed 38'; Rothen 58'	Report	Viduka 14'; Keane 77'	Stadium: Stade de l'Aube; Attendance: 14,500; Referee: Massimo De Santis (Italy)

==== Third round ====
22 November 2001	Grasshoppers	1–2	Leeds United	Zurich
	Chapuisat 18'	Report	Harte 73'; Smith 79'	Stadium: Hardturm; Attendance: 15,000; Referee: Lucílio Batista (Portugal)

6 December 2001	Leeds United	2–2	Grasshoppers	Leeds
	Kewell 19'; Keane 45'	Report	Núñez 45', 90'	Stadium: Elland Road; Attendance: 40,014; Referee: Frank De Bleeckere (Belgium)

==== Fourth round ====
21 February 2002	PSV Eindhoven	0–0	Leeds United	Eindhoven
		Report		Stadium: Philips Stadion; Attendance: 32,000; Referee: Stefano Braschi (Italy)

28 February 2002	Leeds United	0–1	PSV Eindhoven	Leeds
		Report	Vennegoor of Hesselink 90'	Stadium: Elland Road; Attendance: 39,755; Referee: Antonio Jesús López Nieto (Spain)

== Statistics ==
No.	Pos.	Name	League		FA Cup		League Cup		UEFA Cup		Total		Discipline	
No.	Pos.	Name	Apps	Goals	Apps	Goals	Apps	Goals	Apps	Goals	Apps	Goals	Yellow card	Red card
1	GK	(England) Nigel Martyn	38	0	1	0	2	0	8	0	49	0	1	0
2	DF	(Republic of Ireland) Gary Kelly	19+1	0	1	0	0+1	0	3	0	25	0	2	0
3	DF	(Republic of Ireland) Ian Harte	34+2	5	1	0	2	0	8	1	47	6	1	0
4	MF	(France) Olivier Dacourt	16+1	0	0	0	2	0	6	0	25	0	3	0
6	DF	(England) Jonathan Woodgate	11+2	0	1	0	1	0	0	0	15	0	2	0
7	FW	(Republic of Ireland) Robbie Keane	16+9	3	0	0	2	3	6	3	33	9	3	0
9	FW	(Australia) Mark Viduka	33	12	1	1	1	1	7	3	42	17	3	0
10	FW	(Australia) Harry Kewell	26+1	8	0	0	1	1	7	2	35	11	2	0
11	MF	(England) Lee Bowyer	24+1	5	1	0	1	0	3	2	30	9	5	1
14	MF	(Republic of Ireland) Stephen McPhail	0+1	0	0	0	0+2	0	0+1	0	4	0	0	0
16	MF	(England) Jason Wilcox	4+9	0	0	0	1	0	2+1	0	17	0	3	0
17	FW	(England) Alan Smith	19+4	4	1	0	1+1	0	4+1	1	31	5	6	1
18	DF	(England) Danny Mills	28	1	1	0	2	0	8	0	39	1	10	2
19	MF	(Norway) Eirik Bakke	20+7	2	0	0	2	1	6	1	35	4	6	0
20	MF	(England) Seth Johnson	12+2	0	0	0	0	0	0	0	14	0	4	0
21	DF	(Scotland) Dominic Matteo	32	0	0	0	1	0	7	0	40	0	7	1
22	DF	(England) Michael Duberry	3	0	0+1	0	0+2	0	1	0	7	0	1	0
23	MF	(England) David Batty	30+6	0	1	0	1	0	5+1	0	44	0	8	0
27	FW	(England) Robbie Fowler	22	12	1	0	0	0	0	0	23	12	1	0
27	DF	(Republic of Ireland) Alan Maybury	0+1	0	0	0	0	0	0	0	0+1	0	1	0
29	DF	(England) Rio Ferdinand	31	0	1	0	2	0	7	0	40	0	1	0

== Transfers ==
=== In ===
Date	Pos.	Name	From	Fee	Ref.
18 October 2001	MF	(England) Seth Johnson	(England) Derby County	£7,000,000	
29 November 2001	FW	(England) Robbie Fowler	(England) Liverpool	£11,000,000	

=== Out ===
Date	Pos.	Name	To	Fee	Ref.
12 June 2001	FW	(Northern Ireland) Warren Feeney	(England) Bournemouth	Free	
29 November 2001	DF	(Republic of Ireland) Damien Lynch	Released	Free	
2 July 2001	MF	(England) Kevin Dixon	(England) Barnsley	Free	
12 July 2001	MF	(England) Tony Hackworth	(England) Notts County	£120,000	
9 August 2001	DF	(England) Gareth Evans	(England) Huddersfield Town	Free	
12 October 2001	DF	(Republic of Ireland) Alan Maybury	(Scotland) Hearts	£150,000	
20 March 2002	MF	(Northern Ireland) Wesley Boyle	Released	Free	
15 May 2002	DF	(Australia) Danny Hay	Released	Free	

=== Loan out ===
Date from	Date to	Pos.	Name	To	Ref.
11 September 2001	1 December 2001	FW	(England) Harpal Singh	(England) Crewe Alexandra	
1 October 2001	1 November 2001	FW	(Republic of Ireland) Caleb Folan	(England) Rushden & Diamonds	
1 December 2001	31 December 2001	FW	(Republic of Ireland) Caleb Folan	(England) Hull City	
1 March 2002	1 April 2002	FW	(England) Harpal Singh	(England) Bristol City	
14 March 2002	3 May 2002	MF	(Republic of Ireland) Stephen McPhail	(England) Millwall	
