= 1989 NSL Cup =

National Soccer League Cup

Tournament details
- Country: Australia
- Dates: 18 March – 20 August 1989
- Teams: 14

Final positions
- Champions: Adelaide City (2nd title)
- Runners-up: Sydney Olympic

Tournament statistics
- Matches played: 13
- Goals scored: 43 (3.31 per match)
- Attendance: 46,696 (3,592 per match)

The 1989 NSL Cup was the 13th edition of the NSL Cup, which was the main national association football knockout cup competition in Australia.

APIA Leichhardt were the defending champions, having defeated South Melbourne to win their first title in the previous year's final, but they were eliminated in the semi-finals by Sydney Olympic.

Adelaide City defeated Sydney Olympic 2–0 in the final to win their second NSL Cup title.

== Teams ==
The NSL Cup was a knockout competition with 14 teams taking part all trying to reach the Final in August 1989. The competition consisted of the 14 teams from the National Soccer League.

Round	Main date	Number of fixtures	Clubs remaining
First round	Thursday 23 March 1989	6	14 → 8
Second round	Saturday 15 April 1989	4	8 → 4
Semi-finals	Wednesday 19 July 1989	2	4 → 2
Final	Sunday 20 August 1989	1	2 → 1

== First round ==
Adelaide City and Wollongong City had a bye for the First round.

18 March 1989	Marconi Fairfield	2–1 (a.e.t.)	Blacktown City	Sydney
19:30 AEDT	Katholos 75'; Lowe 95'	Report	McKinna 49'	Stadium: Marconi Stadium; Referee: Richard Lorenc

22 March 1989	Melbourne JUST	1–2	Sunshine George Cross	Melbourne
19:30 AEDT	Palatsides 28'	Report	Faulkner 51'; Lewis 73'	Stadium: Olympic Park; Attendance: 500; Referee: John Fraser

23 March 1989	Heidelberg United	2–1	Melbourne Croatia	Melbourne
19:00 AEDT	Scott 30'; Burgess 88'	Report	Adzic 72'	Stadium: Olympic Park; Attendance: 8,000; Referee: Dennis Voutsinas

23 March 1989	Preston Makedonia	0–1	South Melbourne	Melbourne
20:45 AEDT		Report	Taliadoros 83'	Stadium: Olympic Park; Attendance: 8,000; Referee: Chris Bambridge

23 March 1989	St George-Budapest	3–6	Sydney Olympic	Sydney
19:30 AEDT	Harper 23'; Moffitt 36'; Krslovic 39'	Report	Saad 31', 34', 65'; Barrett 28', ?'; Edwards ?'	Stadium: St George Stadium; Attendance: 2,795; Referee: Arthur Owens

23 March 1989	Sydney Croatia	1–2	APIA Leichhardt	Sydney
19:30 AEDT	Rezo ?'	Report	Hagan 63'; R. Brown ?'	Stadium: Croatian Sports Centre; Attendance: 1,705; Referee: Alan Townsend

== Second round ==
14 April 1989	Adelaide City	4–0	Sunshine George Cross	Adelaide
19:30 ACST	Melta 33', 73'; Villani 50'; V. Vidmar 88'	Report		Stadium: Hindmarsh Stadium; Attendance: 2,000; Referee: Tom McRoe

15 April 1989	Marconi Fairfield	1–3	Sydney Olympic	Sydney
14:30 AEST	Nastevski 18'	Report	Ironside 39'; Phillips 61'; Polak 72'	Stadium: Marconi Stadium; Attendance: 3,056; Referee: Peter Spiers

15 April 1989	Wollongong City	1–2	APIA Leichhardt	Wollongong
14:30 AEST	Ellem 27' (o.g.)	Report	Blagojevic 40'; Hagan ?'	Stadium: Brandon Park; Attendance: 465; Referee: John McConnell

19 April 1989	Heidelberg United	2–3	South Melbourne	Melbourne
19:30 AEST	Goutzioulis 47'; Stevenson 73'	Report	Taliadoros 1', 13', 63'	Stadium: Olympic Park; Attendance: 5,000; Referee: Jim Fearn

== Semi-finals ==
25 April 1989	South Melbourne	0–2	Adelaide City	Melbourne
14:30 AEST		Report	Melta 46' (pen.); Maxwell 52'	Stadium: Olympic Park; Attendance: 1,500; Referee: Chris Bambridge

19 July 1989	Sydney Olympic	1–0	APIA Leichhardt	Sydney
14:30 AEST	Koch 87' (pen.)	Report		Stadium: St George Stadium; Attendance: 3,675; Referee: John McConnell

== Final ==
20 August 1989

Adelaide City	2–0	Sydney Olympic
Maxwell 25'; Vidmar 40'	Report

Hindmarsh Stadium, Adelaide
Attendance: 10,000
Referee: Don Campbell
