= 1990–91 National Soccer League =

Australian soccer season

NSL 1990-91
- League: National Soccer League
- Sport: Association football
- Duration: 1990–91
- Number of teams: 14

NSL season
- Champions: South Melbourne
- Top scorer: David Seal (19)

National Soccer League seasons
- ← 1989–90 1991–92 →

The 1990–91 National Soccer League season, was the 15th season of the National Soccer League in Australia.

== Regular season ==
=== League table ===
Pos	Team	Pld	W	D	L	GF	GA	GD	Pts	Qualification or relegation
1	Melbourne Croatia	26	15	7	4	55	39	+16	37	Qualification for the Finals series
2	South Melbourne (C)	26	14	6	6	45	33	+12	34	Qualification for the Finals series
3	Adelaide City	26	12	9	5	40	24	+16	33	Qualification for the Finals series
4	Marconi Fairfield	26	14	3	9	48	33	+15	31	Qualification for the Finals series
5	Parramatta Eagles	26	10	9	7	38	31	+7	29	Qualification for the Finals series
6	Sydney Olympic	26	8	13	5	31	25	+6	29	
7	Sydney Croatia	26	8	10	8	27	33	−6	26	
8	Preston Makedonia	26	8	9	9	26	27	−1	25	
9	Wollongong City	26	8	8	10	32	34	−2	24	
10	St George-Budapest (R)	26	6	10	10	34	41	−7	22	Relegation to the NSW Division 1
11	APIA Leichhardt	26	7	7	12	27	28	−1	21	
12	Heidelberg United	26	6	9	11	26	37	−11	21	
13	Sunshine George Cross (R)	26	7	3	16	39	53	−14	17	Relegation to the Victorian Premier League
14	Wollongong Macedonia (R)	26	3	9	14	23	53	−30	15	Relegation to the NSW Division 1

Updated to match(es) played on unknown. Source: rsssf.com
Rules for classification: 1) points; 2) goal difference; 3) number of goals scored.
(C) Champions; (R) Relegated

== Finals series ==
Elimination and qualifying Finals
2	South Melbourne	4
3	Adelaide City	2
4	Marconi Fairfield (p)	3 (7)
5	Parramatta Eagles	3 (6)

Semi-finals
1	Melbourne Croatia	1
2	South Melbourne	0
3	Adelaide City	1
4	Marconi Fairfield	0

Preliminary Final
2	South Melbourne	1
3	Adelaide City	0

Grand Final
1	Melbourne Croatia	1 (4)
2	South Melbourne (p)	1 (5)

== Individual awards ==
- Player of the Year: Milan Ivanovic (Adelaide City)
- U-21 Player of the Year: Paul Okon (Marconi Fairfield)
- Top Scorer: David Seal (Marconi Fairfield) – 19 goals
- Coach of the Year: Zoran Matic (Adelaide City)
