= Mike Petersen (soccer) =

Australian soccer player (born 1965)

Personal information
- Full name: Michael Petersen
- Date of birth: 6 May 1965 (age 61)
- Place of birth: Melbourne, Australia
- Position: Midfielder

Youth career
- Port Melbourne

Senior career*
Years	Team	Apps	(Gls)
1983–1984	Heidelberg United	39	(3)
1984–1985	Roda JC	1	(0)
1984–1986	Brunswick Juventus	34	(5)
1987	Ajax	1	(0)
1988	Brunswick Juventus	17	(0)
1989–1997	South Melbourne	171	(8)

International career^{‡}
1985	Australia B	2	(1)
1985–1992	Australia	32	(1)

Managerial career
- 1999–2000: St. Albans
- 2000–2001: South Melbourne
- 2001: Auckland Football Kingz
- * Club domestic league appearances and goals as of 5 September 2008 ‡ National team caps and goals as of 5 September 2008

Michael Petersen (born 6 May 1965) is an Australian former soccer player. He is an inductee of the Football Federation Australia - Football Hall of Fame.

== Club career ==
Petersen played for Heidelberg United, Brunswick and South Melbourne in Australia, as well as in the Netherlands with Roda JC and Ajax.

He played nine seasons with South Melbourne between 1989 and 1997, winning the NSL Championship in 1991.

== International career ==
Petersen represented Australia 50 times, including 32 A International matches.
