= Steve Maxwell (soccer) =

Australian soccer player (1965–2024)

Personal information
- Full name: Stephen Alexander Maxwell
- Date of birth: 7 January 1965
- Place of birth: North Adelaide, South Australia
- Date of death: 10 March 2024 (aged 59)
- Place of death: Adelaide, South Australia
- Position: Forward

Youth career
- West Torrens Birkalla

Senior career*
Years	Team	Apps	(Gls)
1983–1986	Adelaide City	93	(23)
1987	Marconi Stallions	22	(5)
1988–1994	Adelaide City	181	(46)
Total		296	(74)

International career
1986–1992	Australia	4	(0)
- * Club domestic league appearances and goals

Stephen Alexander Maxwell (7 January 1965 – 10 March 2024) was an Australian professional soccer player who played as a striker. Maxwell's club career was predominantly with South Australian club Adelaide City during their time in the former National Soccer League where he would see multiple titles. Maxwell played the 1987 National Soccer League season with Sydney club Marconi Stallions before returning to Adelaide. Internationally, Maxwell was called upon for the Australia U20 squad in 1983, but didn't make an appearance. He would have to wait until 1986 at the age of twenty-three, making his debut against Czechoslovakia on 6 August 1986 for the senior national team. Maxwell would make a total of four senior international appearances over a six-year span. Maxwell died on 10 March 2024, at the age of 59.

== Honours ==
Adelaide City

- National Soccer League Finals: 1986, 1991–92, 1993–94
- National Soccer League Cup: 1989, 1991–92
