= Mark Viduka =

Australian soccer player (born 1975)

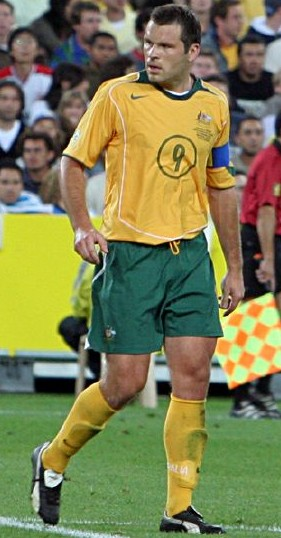
- Viduka in 2005

Personal information
- Full name: Mark Antony Viduka
- Date of birth: 9 October 1975 (age 51)
- Place of birth: Melbourne, Australia
- Height: 1.88 m (6 ft 2 in)
- Position: Forward

Youth career
- 1992–1993: Australian Institute of Sport

Senior career*
Years	Team	Apps	(Gls)
1993–1995	Melbourne Knights	48	(40)
1995–1998	Dinamo Zagreb	84	(40)
1998–2000	Celtic	37	(30)
2000–2004	Leeds United	130	(59)
2004–2007	Middlesbrough	72	(26)
2007–2009	Newcastle United	38	(7)
Total		491	(202)

International career
1993–1994	Australia U20	20	(32)
1994–2000	Australia U23	21	(17)
1994–2007	Australia	43	(11)
Medal record
Men's football
Representing Australia
FIFA Confederations Cup
Runner-up	1997 Saudi Arabia
OFC U-20 Championship
Winner	1994 Fiji
OFC U-23 Championship
Winner	1996 Australia
- * Club domestic league appearances and goals

Mark Antony Viduka (/vɪˈduːkə/ vih-DOOK-ə; Croatian: [mark ˈʋiduka]; born 9 October 1975) is an Australian former professional soccer player who played as a centre forward.

Viduka captained the Australia national team at the 2006 FIFA World Cup, reaching the last sixteen, which remains their joint-best performance to date. During his sixteen year professional career, Viduka mostly played abroad for clubs in Croatia, Scotland and England. His four UEFA Champions League goals are the most scored in the competition by an Australian player.

== Club career ==
=== Melbourne Knights ===
In 1993, Viduka started his professional career in Australia for Melbourne Knights (which up until the 1993 season was known as Melbourne Croatia) and became an Australian international in June of the following year. In his two seasons with the Knights, he was top goal scorer in the National Soccer League (NSL) and was twice awarded the Johnny Warren Medal for NSL Best Player of the Year in 1993–94 and 1994–95. His time at Melbourne Knights included one NSL title in the 1994–95 season. The grandstand at Knights' Stadium, home of the Knights, was renamed the "Mark Viduka Stand" in his honour and paid for with his transfer money.

=== Dinamo Zagreb ===
In 1995, Viduka moved to Croatia to play with Croatia Zagreb (now Dinamo Zagreb). He spent three and a half seasons with the club, helping it to win three doubles in Croatia between 1996 and 1998. He was also part of the Croatia Zagreb team that reached the third round of the UEFA Cup in 1997 and went on to make his UEFA Champions League group stage debut with the club a year later. He won the Best Foreigner Footballer Award in the Croatian League in his time at Zagreb.

=== Celtic ===
Celtic bought Viduka in December 1998 for £3.5 million. In the same month as his signing, Celtic announced that Viduka had quit the club without kicking a ball for them, citing stress as his reason.

A week later, Croatia Zagreb complained that it had not received the agreed fee for the player. These issues were eventually resolved and Viduka made his first appearance in a Celtic shirt on 16 February 1999, scoring for the under-21 team as an over-age player in a 4–2 victory against Motherwell. After making his first team debut against Dundee United on 27 February 1999, his first goals for the club came when he scored a brace against Greenock Morton in the Scottish Cup on 8 March 1999. He was voted Scottish Player of the Year for 1999–2000 after scoring 27 goals in his first full season at Celtic Park. He was regarded as a skilled player, with Josip Šimunić noting his ability to hold the ball up well and bring other players into the game.

In February 2000, lower league team Inverness Caledonian Thistle defeated Celtic in a shock upset in the third round of the Scottish Cup. During half time Viduka reportedly threw his boots in the bin and refused to play in the second half after an altercation with assistant coach, Eric Black. The match ended 3–1 with Celtic fans in uproar.

In March 2000, Viduka assisted Celtic to win Scotland's 1999-2000 Scottish League Cup. He left after his first full season at the club.

=== Leeds United ===
Leeds United manager David O'Leary signed Viduka just before the 2000–01 season for £6 million. At Leeds, he was expected to line up in a three-pronged attack alongside the previous season's top scorer Michael Bridges and Australia teammate Harry Kewell, but injuries to those two saw him form a partnership with Alan Smith in Leeds' Champions League matches, while Robbie Keane – signed on loan from Inter Milan as cover for Bridges – also benefited in their Premier League matches together in the second half of the season. In his first season, Viduka scored 22 goals, including all four in a memorable 4–3 win over Liverpool at Elland Road. He signed a five-year deal in the summer of 2001 and would star in both domestic competitions and Europe, with Leeds finishing in the country's top four in 2000–01, and fifth in 2001–02. In the summer of 2001, Viduka was the subject of interest from A.C. Milan, whom he supported as a child, but the move ultimately did not happen, and held talks with Alex Ferguson at Manchester United, but decided against moving across the Pennines to join Leeds' rivals.

In the 2002–03 campaign, Viduka scored another 22 goals, including a hat-trick in a 6–1 win at Charlton Athletic and the winner in a 3–2 victory at Arsenal on the penultimate day of the season that effectively saved United from relegation.

However, the club's financial crisis continued, and resulted in the sale of key players including Harry Kewell and Robbie Keane. In the 2003–04 season, Viduka was again top scorer at Leeds, finishing the season strongly as was the case in the previous season, as interim manager Eddie Gray attempted to steer the club away from the Premier League trap door following the departure of Peter Reid in November after eight months as manager.

However, during his final appearance in the jersey, Leeds were relegated in a 4–1 loss to Bolton Wanderers at Reebok Stadium. After scoring a penalty, Viduka was sent off following two yellow cards. He was sold to Middlesbrough in the summer of 2004 as United's financial difficulties deepened.

=== Middlesbrough ===
Following Middlesbrough's League Cup victory in 2004, the club qualified for the 2004–05 UEFA Cup. The squad was bolstered with a number of high-profile signings to cope with the increased fixture list and to ensure it could compete on the European stage. Viduka was signed from Leeds for £4.5 million and unveiled as one of the marquee signings of the summer.

Viduka's debut season at Middlesbrough was initially impressive, albeit frustrated by injuries. However, in his second season, the 2005–06 season, Viduka was in sensational form in all competitions for Middlesbrough, reaching double figures early on in the season, including a stunning volley away at Birmingham. He played an important part in helping the club reach the League Cup quarter final, FA Cup semi final and UEFA cup final. Viduka helped to spearhead a European campaign which saw the club overturn a three-goal deficit in the quarter and semi final second legs of the competition to proceed to the final. Middlesbrough eventually lost in the final to Sevilla on 10 May 2006, a result which Viduka has since said took him four months to get over.

In August 2006, he was awarded the number 9 shirt at Middlesbrough, his preferred number at all his previous clubs. Viduka's third season at Middlesbrough was his most prolific, scoring 19 goals in all competitions. With his contract due to expire at the end of the 2006–07 season, Middlesbrough manager Gareth Southgate expressed his interest in retaining Viduka. Southgate reiterated his wish to retain Viduka's services and revealed he would offer him a new contract. Given his impressive haul for the season, Viduka attracted interest from a number of clubs who were hoping to sign him on a free transfer as he became out-of-contract. Viduka joined north-east rivals Newcastle United on a free transfer on 7 June 2007.

Viduka remains Middlesbrough's top goalscorer at the Riverside, and regularly features in Middlesbrough fan polls for top XI Riverside era players.

=== Newcastle United ===
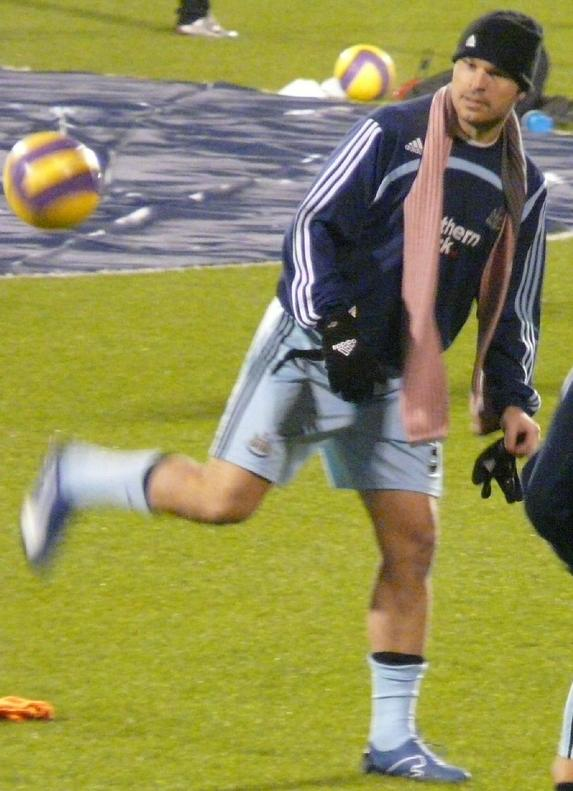
Viduka warming up for Newcastle

In signing for Newcastle, Viduka became manager Sam Allardyce's first signing at the club. His contract was for two years, with the option of a third year. He made his Newcastle debut in a Premier League match at Bolton on 11 August and scored his first goal on 26 August against his former club Middlesbrough.

On 23 September, he scored a further two goals against West Ham United to bring his tally up to three for Newcastle. On 23 December, he again scored two goals against Derby County. After an injury lay off over the new year, Viduka was brought back into the side by new manager Kevin Keegan, where he played as part of a 4–3–3 formation along with Michael Owen and Obafemi Martins. This new formation brought about a change of fortune for Newcastle as the three strikers rescued them from a relegation battle, with Viduka scoring two more goals over the rest of the season and setting up others for Martins and Owen before picking up an Achilles' heel injury before the last game of the season.

Viduka made his return to the first team after six months out injured at former club Middlesbrough, coming on for Martins as a substitute on 29 November 2008. This was a great relief for manager Joe Kinnear, who stated that he had previously feared the Australian's career might have been prematurely ended by his injury woes. Later, Kinnear suggested to reporters that Viduka might call time on his career at the end of the 2008–09 season. Viduka, however, later expressed his desire to continue playing past this season after acquiring a groin injury in late December. After returning from injury, he was immediately used by newly appointed coach Alan Shearer in an attempt to prevent the team's relegation. After playing a man of the match performance in the 3–1 victory against his former team Middlesbrough, Mark appeared to have scored his first goal of the season against Fulham. Match referee Howard Webb, however, ruled that Kevin Nolan impeded goalkeeper Mark Schwarzer disallowing the goal. He was released following Newcastle's relegation.

== International career ==
Viduka was available to be selected to Australia, Croatia and Ukraine due to his origins, and he began his international career with Australia in a friendly series against South Africa at the age of 18 in June 1994. The first game was played in Adelaide and the second game was played in Sydney. Australia won both games 1–0. He scored his first international goal in October 1997 in the 23rd minute of a friendly game against Tunisia.

In 1996, Viduka joined the Olyroos as they competed in the 1996 Summer Olympics. In Australia's first group game they lost to France 2–0. In their second group match they defeated Saudi Arabia 2–1. Viduka scored Australia's second goal in the 63rd minute with a clever back flick past the goalkeeper. In Australia's final group game Viduka made a contribution early in the game with an assist to Aurelio Vidmar in the 3rd minute. Despite Australia's early 0–2 lead, Spain made a spirited comeback and won 3–2. Due to the losses to France and Spain the Olyroos did not progress further in the tournament.

Viduka featured in the two World Cup qualifiers against Iran in 1997. Australia failed to qualify. Viduka was also a part of the Australia team that competed in the 1997 Confederations Cup. He scored Australia's opening goal in a 3–1 win over Mexico in Australia's first group game. However, in the final against Brazil he was sent off in the 24th minute after receiving a red card. Australia went on to lose the encounter 6–0.

In 1999, Viduka featured in a friendly against Brazil. The game was played at the Melbourne Cricket Ground and concluded with a 2–2 draw. Viduka assisted Paul Agostino with the first goal of the game. He also appeared in friendly matches against Hungary and Czech Republic in 2000. Defeating Hungary 3-0 and losing to Czech Republic 3–1. That same here Viduka once again joined the Olyroos in the 2000 Olympic Games in his home country of Australia. In 2001, he played alongside Australia as they competed against Uruguay in a two leg World Cup Qualifier. Australia lost on aggregate 3–1. This meant Viduka and Australia spent another World Cup on the sidelines.

In 2003, Viduka scored his third international goal in a friendly against Ireland. Australia would go on to lose the match 2–1.

Viduka began captaining Australia in September 2005 in place of the injured Craig Moore, the regular captain. His first game as captain was in a World Cup Qualifier against Solomon Islands in Sydney, in which Australia won 7–0. He scored 2 goals on the occasion including a spectacular bicycle-kick goal. Viduka would go on to score a third goal only to be denied a hat-trick after being ruled offside. It was his first time playing against a team from the Oceana region. In October 2005, he continued his captaincy when he led Australia to a 5-0 crushing of Jamaica at Craven Cottage in a friendly game. In the 47th minute of the game Archie Thompson crossed to Viduka, who controlled the ball, thought about appealing for handball but then had time to crash the ball into the net.

Viduka thrived under Guus Hiddink's tenure as coach of the national squad and led Australia as it qualified for the 2006 FIFA World Cup in Germany over a two-leg qualifier against Uruguay. In the second leg, during the first half a swift flick kick from Viduka found Harry Kewell inside the box. Kewell scuffed his shot but the ball bounced kindly to Mark Bresciano who went on to score the goal that forced the Qualifier to go to a penalty shoot out. Viduka would go on to miss his penalty, however Australia went on to win the shootout anyway.

It was the first time in 32 years that Australia qualified to participate in the World Cup. On 21 May 2006, he was named as the Australian captain for the World Cup.

In a lead up to the World Cup, Viduka captained Australia to friendly matches against the Netherlands and Greece. The Greece game was played at the Melbourne Cricket Ground. Australia won 1–0. Australia's game with the Netherlands ended with a 1–1 draw. After trailing 1-0 Australia earned a penalty in the second half. Viduka took the spot kick, only to hit the top bar. However Tim Cahill scored of the rebound. Viduka also led Australia's national team to their first World Cup finals victory with a 3–1 win over Japan in June 2006, as well as guiding them through an encounter with Brazil, losing 2–0, and a controversial bout with Croatia, ending with a 2–2 draw. He then led Australia into the second round, where they lost their round of 16 match to Italy by a controversial penalty goal scored by Francesco Totti in the final minutes of the match. Although a regular scorer in the Premier League, Viduka has struggled to score any significant goals for the Socceroos, and the 2006 World Cup was no different.

Viduka considered retiring from international competition after the 2006 World Cup, citing increasing family commitments as the primary reason. In September 2006, however, he confirmed that he would continue playing for Australia and intended to compete in the 2007 Asian Cup. In a friendly against Singapore, a week before the start of the Asian Cup, Viduka scored two headed goals in a 3–0 victory for Australia; former Leeds teammate Harry Kewell scored the third. It was the second time he scored two goals in an international match, having previously done so against the Solomon Islands in 2005.

On Australia's first ever Asian Cup participation, Viduka captained the side and he scored their solitary goal against Iraq, a game which they ultimately lost 1–3. In the next match, he scored two goals against co-host team Thailand, defeating them 4–0; other goals scored by Michael Beauchamp and Harry Kewell and making them fall out of the remaining competition. At one stage, he led the goalscoring at the Asian Cup tournament, although his team was eliminated in the quarter-finals in a penalty shootout against Japan. Subsequent to that loss, question marks hang over whether Viduka will continue his international career. Two years on from the 2007 Asian Cup, he was still yet to return for the Socceroos, either stating he had injuries or club commitments. He missed World Cup Qualifiers against Qatar, Bahrain and Japan, even though fully fit and asked to play by then-Socceroos manager Pim Verbeek. Questions were raised over his commitment to the national team, even by other members of the squad. Despite calls from Adrian Alston, Graham Arnold and Viduka's then-agent Steve Kutner for Viduka to be selected for the 2010 FIFA World Cup, Viduka had already decided to retire, aged 34.

== Personal life ==
Viduka and his wife Ivana have three sons together: Joseph (born November 2002), Lucas (born September 2006) and Oliver (born May 2008). His father Joe immigrated to Australia from Croatia in the 1960s, and Croatian footballer and Ballon d'Or winner Luka Modrić is his cousin.

Viduka currently lives in Zagreb, where he owns a coffee shop and enjoys making coffee. Viduka is fluent in Croatian.

Viduka had a song written about him by English singer/songwriter and Middlesbrough fan Alistair Griffin (who also previously co-wrote the football song recorded by Terry Venables). The song lyrics were written to the tune of Leonard Cohen's "Hallelujah". Middlesbrough manager Gareth Southgate embraced the tune as a way of raising money for his chosen charity, Macmillan Cancer Support. Leonard Cohen gave permission for the song to be released as a charity download single.

Viduka was a huge AC Milan fan as a kid as he grew up watching Marco van Basten, Frank Rijkaard and Ruud Gullit.

Viduka has been a member of Melbourne City FC (formerly Melbourne Heart) since its inaugural season. He is affectionately referred to by his nicknames "V-Bomber" and "Big Dukes" in Australia.

== Career statistics ==
=== Club ===
Appearances and goals by club, season and competition
Club	Season	League			National cup (Note: Includes NSL Cup, Croatian Football Cup, Scottish Cup, FA Cup)		League cup (Note: Includes Scottish League Cup, Football League Cup)		Continental		Total	
Club	Season	Division	Apps	Goals	Apps	Goals	Apps	Goals	Apps	Goals	Apps	Goals
Melbourne Knights	1992–93	National Soccer League	4	2	0	0	—		—		4	2
Melbourne Knights	1993–94	National Soccer League	20	17	2	1	—		—		22	18
Melbourne Knights	1994–95	National Soccer League	24	21	3	6	—		—		27	27
Melbourne Knights	Total		48	40	5	7	—		—		53	47
Croatia Zagreb	1995–96	Prva HNL	27	12	2	0	—		0	0	29	12
Croatia Zagreb	1996–97	Prva HNL	25	18	3	2	—		2 (Note: Appearances in UEFA Cup)	3	30	23
Croatia Zagreb	1997–98	Prva HNL	25	8	5	2	—		8 (Note: Four appearances and two goals in UEFA Champions League, four appearances and one goal in UEFA Cup)	3	35	13
Croatia Zagreb	1998–99	Prva HNL	7	2	0	0	—		2 (Note: Appearances in UEFA Champions League)	2	9	4
Croatia Zagreb	Total		84	40	10	4	—		12	8	103	52
Celtic	1998–99	Scottish Premier League	9	5	2	3	0	0	0	0	11	8
Celtic	1999–2000	Scottish Premier League	28	25	1	0	4	1	4	1	37	27
Celtic	Total		37	30	3	3	4	1	4	1	48	35
Leeds United	2000–01	Premier League	34	17	2	1	1	0	16	4	53	22
Leeds United	2001–02	Premier League	33	12	1	1	1	1	7	3	42	17
Leeds United	2002–03	Premier League	33	20	4	2	1	0	2	0	40	22
Leeds United	2003–04	Premier League	30	11	1	1	0	0	—		31	12
Leeds United	Total		130	60	8	5	3	1	25	7	166	73
Middlesbrough	2004–05	Premier League	16	5	0	0	1	0	4	2	21	7
Middlesbrough	2005–06	Premier League	27	7	5	2	2	1	9	6	43	16
Middlesbrough	2006–07	Premier League	29	14	7	5	1	0	0	0	37	19
Middlesbrough	Total		72	26	12	7	4	1	13	8	101	42
Newcastle United	2007–08	Premier League	26	7	2	0	0	0	—		28	7
Newcastle United	2008–09	Premier League	12	0	0	0	0	0	—		12	0
Newcastle United	Total		38	7	2	0	0	0	—		40	7
Career total			409	202	35	26	11	3	54	24	509	255

=== International ===
Appearances and goals by national team and year
National team	Year	Apps	Goals
Australia	1994	2	0
Australia	1995	0	0
Australia	1996	0	0
Australia	1997	10	2
Australia	1998	2	0
Australia	1999	0	0
Australia	2000	2	0
Australia	2001	3	0
Australia	2002	0	0
Australia	2003	3	1
Australia	2004	2	0
Australia	2005	7	3
Australia	2006	6	0
Australia	2007	6	5
Total		43	11

Scores and results list Australia's goal tally first, score column indicates score after each Viduka goal.

List of international goals scored by Mark Viduka
No.	Date	Venue	Opponent	Score	Result	Competition
1	1 October 1997	Stade El Menzah, Tunis, Tunisia	Tunisia	2–0	3–0	Friendly
2	12 December 1997	King Fahd Stadium, Riyadh, Saudi Arabia	Mexico	1–0	3–1	1997 FIFA Confederations Cup
3	19 August 2003	Lansdowne Road, Dublin, Ireland	Republic of Ireland	1–0	1–2	Friendly
4	3 September 2005	Sydney Football Stadium, Sydney, Australia	Solomon Islands	2–0	7–0	2006 FIFA World Cup qualification
5	3 September 2005	Sydney Football Stadium, Sydney, Australia	Solomon Islands	3–0	7–0	2006 FIFA World Cup qualification
6	9 October 2005	Craven Cottage, London, England	Jamaica	3–0	5–0	Friendly
7	30 June 2007	National Stadium, Singapore City, Singapore	Singapore	1–0	3–0	Friendly
8	30 June 2007	National Stadium, Singapore City, Singapore	Singapore	3–0	3–0	Friendly
9	13 July 2007	Rajamangala National Stadium, Bangkok, Thailand	Iraq	1–1	1–3	2007 AFC Asian Cup
10	21 July 2007	Rajamangala National Stadium, Bangkok, Thailand	Thailand	2–0	4–0	2007 AFC Asian Cup
11	21 July 2007	Rajamangala National Stadium, Bangkok, Thailand	Thailand	3–0	4–0	2007 AFC Asian Cup

== Honours ==
Melbourne Knights

- National Soccer League: 1994–95
- National Soccer League Cup: 1994–95
- NSL Minor Premiership: 1993–94, 1994–95

Dinamo Zagreb

- Prva HNL: 1995–96, 1996–97, 1997–98
- Croatian Cup: 1995–96, 1996–97, 1997–98

Celtic

- Scottish League Cup: 1999–2000

Middlesbrough

- UEFA Cup: Runner-up, 2005–06

Australia

- FIFA Confederations Cup: Runner-up, 1997

Australia U-20

- OFC U-20 Championship: 1994

Australia U23

- OFC U-23 Championship: 1996

Individual

- Oceania Footballer of the Year: 2000
- Australian Sports Medal: 2000
- SPFA Players' Player of the Year: 2000
- NSL Top Goalscorer: 1993–94, 1994–95
- NSL U21 Player of the Year: 1993–94, 1994–95
- Johnny Warren Medal: 1993–94, 1994–95
- SPL Top Goalscorer: 1999–00
- Australian Institute of Sport 'Best of the Best': 2001.
- Alex Tobin OAM Medal: 2011
- FFA Hall of Fame: 2014
- Sport Australia Hall of Fame inductee: 2021
