= David Seal =

Australian soccer player

Personal information
- Full name: David Seal
- Date of birth: 26 January 1972 (age 54)
- Place of birth: Penrith, New South Wales, Australia
- Height: 1.80 m (5 ft 11 in)
- Position: Striker

Youth career
- Penrith RSL SC

Senior career*
Years	Team	Apps	(Gls)
1989–1990	Sydney United	31	(18)
1990–1992	Marconi Fairfield	47	(28)
1992–1993	Sydney Olympic	23	(10)
1993–1994	Eendracht Aalst	0	(0)
1994–1997	Bristol City	51	(10)
1997–1999	Northampton Town	46	(13)
1999–2000	Northern Spirit	20	(9)
2000–2006	Mangotsfield United	236	(166)
2006	Yate Town		
2006–2007	Mangotsfield United	8	(4)
2007	Bitton	2	(1)
2008–2010	Melksham Town	23	(3)

International career^{‡}
1990–1991	Australia U-20	6	(3)
1991–1992	Australia U-23	13	(4)

Managerial career
- 2017-2018: Mangotsfield United (Assistant coach)
- * Club domestic league appearances and goals as of 1 September 2009 ‡ National team caps and goals as of 21 September 2008

David Seal (born 26 January 1972) is a former Australian soccer player. He played as a striker.

== Career ==
Seal started his career in the National Soccer League (NSL) in Australia where he played for Sydney Croatia, Marconi Fairfield and Sydney Olympic and was the NSL top goal scorer two consecutive seasons in the 1989–90 season with Sydney Croatia scoring 15 goals, and the 1990–91 season with Marconi Fairfield scoring 19 goals.

He moved to Europe in 1993, joining Belgian side Eendracht Aalst in Belgium. He had a trial with Norwich City while at Eendracht but no contract was offered. In October 1994 he moved to England, joining Bristol City for a fee of £80,000. He moved to Northampton Town on loan in August 1997, scoring four times in six league games during his loan spell. Such was his form that the move was made permanent, Seal costing the Cobblers £90,000, on 12 September 1997.

Seal finished his first season with Northampton as their leading goalscoring, with 14 goals in league and cup games. He was also the leading goalscorer for their reserve side with 12 goals in 10 games. He remained with Northampton until May 1999 when he was released after Northampton's relegation to Division Three.

He returned to Australia to play for Northern Spirit in the 1999–2000 NSL season where he scored 9 goals in 20 appearances. However, after just one season Seal returned to England, where he joined Mangotsfield United in July 2000. In the 2001–02 season, he scored 11 goals in the FA Cup for Mangotsfield, earning him an award as the FA Cup's leading goalscorer. Seal scored 166 goals in 236 appearances for Mangotsfield, before joining local rivals Yate Town in July 2006.

Seal's stay with Yate lasted only four months, returning to Mangotsfield United in December 2006. However, his return to Mangotsfield was a short one as in March 2007, he joined Western Football League Premier Division side Bitton where he only made two appearances.

In September 2008, Seal joined Western Football League Premier Division side Melksham Town as part of the coaching staff and as a player.

== International career ==
Seal represented the Australian Under 20's which finished fourth at the 1991 FIFA World Youth Championship in Portugal, where he played all six games. He scored three goals in total which included one goal in a 2–0 win over Trinidad and Tobago in the first round, scored the only goal in a 1–1 draw with Syria in the quarter finals which Australia won 5–4 after a penalty shoot-out, and scored the only goal in the 1–1 draw against USSR in the third place play-off match – which Australia lost after a penalty shoot-out 5–4.

He also competed at the 1992 Summer Olympics in Spain for the Australian U23 team which finished fourth, playing in five games.

== Honours ==
Mangotsfield United

- Southern League Division One West championship: 2004–05
- Gloucestershire Senior Cup: 2002-03

Personal honours

- FA Cup top scorer: 2001-02 with Mangotsfield United - 11 goals
- NSL top scorer: 1989–90 with Sydney United – 15 goals
- NSL top scorer: 1990–91 with Marconi Fairfield – 19 goals
