= 1989–90 National Soccer League =

Australian soccer season

NSL 1989–90
- League: National Soccer League
- Sport: Association football
- Duration: 1989–90
- Number of teams: 14

NSL season
- Champions: Sydney Olympic
- Top scorer: David Seal (15)

National Soccer League seasons
- ← 1989 1990–91 →

The 1989–90 National Soccer League season, was the 14th season of the National Soccer League in Australia. The league was known as the Quit NSL under a sponsorship arrangement with the Victorian Health Promotion Foundation.

== Regular season ==
=== League table ===
Pos	Team	Pld	W	D	L	GF	GA	GD	Pts	Qualification or relegation
1	Marconi Fairfield	26	16	6	4	51	24	+27	38	Qualification for the Finals series
2	South Melbourne	26	15	6	5	42	23	+19	36	Qualification for the Finals series
3	Melbourne Croatia	26	14	7	5	49	26	+23	35	Qualification for the Finals series
4	Adelaide City	26	13	8	5	39	23	+16	34	Qualification for the Finals series
5	Sydney Olympic (C)	26	12	7	7	40	25	+15	31	Qualification for the Finals series
6	APIA Leichhardt	26	11	9	6	36	25	+11	31	
7	Sydney Croatia	26	10	6	10	40	39	+1	26	
8	Parramatta Eagles	26	10	6	10	31	31	0	26	
9	Preston Makedonia	26	9	5	12	33	35	−2	23	
10	St George-Budapest	26	7	7	12	35	44	−9	21	
11	Wollongong City	26	8	4	14	30	48	−18	20	
12	Sunshine George Cross	26	6	5	15	24	49	−25	17	
13	West Adelaide (R)	26	5	4	17	21	54	−33	14	Relegation to the South Australian Division 1
14	Blacktown City (R)	26	4	4	18	30	55	−25	12	Relegation to the NSW Division 1

Updated to match(es) played on unknown. Source: rsssf.com
Rules for classification: 1) points; 2) goal difference; 3) number of goals scored.
(C) Champions; (R) Relegated

== Finals series ==
Elimination and qualifying Finals
2	South Melbourne	1 (6)
3	Melbourne Croatia	1 (7)
4	Adelaide City	1
5	Sydney Olympic	2

Semi-finals
1	Marconi Fairfield	1
3	Melbourne Croatia	0
2	South Melbourne	0
5	Sydney Olympic	1

Preliminary Final
3	Melbourne Croatia	1
5	Sydney Olympic	2

Grand Final
1	Marconi Fairfield	0
5	Sydney Olympic	2

=== Grand Final ===
Marconi Stallions	0–2	Sydney Olympic
		Alistair Edwards, Robert Ironside

Parramatta Stadium, Sydney
Attendance: 26,353
Referee: John Santa Isabel

1	(Australia) Bob Catlin
2	(Australia) Gary van Egmond
3	(Australia) Jean-Paul de Marigny
4	(Australia) Steve Calderan (c)
5	(Australia) Robert Wheatley
6	(Australia) Ian Gray
7	(Australia) Tom McCulloch
8	(Australia) Vince Colagiuri
9	(New Zealand) Fred de Jong
10	(Australia) Paul Okon
11	(Australia) David Lowe
Substitutes:
12	(Australia) Peter Katholos
14	(Australia) Gerry Gomez
20	(Australia) Mark Schwarzer
Manager:
(Australia) Bertie Mariani

1	(New Zealand) Clint Gosling
2	(Australia) David Barrett
3	(Australia) Robert Hooker (c)
4	(Australia) Tony Spyridakos
5	(Australia) Andrew Bernal
6	(Australia) Gary Phillips
7	(Australia) Grant Lee
8	(Australia) Alistair Edwards
9	(Australia) Abbas Saad
10	(New Zealand) Robert Ironside
11	(Australia) Steve Refenes
Substitutes:
12	(Australia) Marko Perinovic
13	(Australia) Eric Hristodoulou
20	(Australia) Gary Meier
Manager:
(England) Mick Hickman

== Individual awards ==
- Player of the Year: Zeljko Adzic (Melbourne Croatia)
- U-21 Player of the Year: Paul Okon (Marconi Fairfield)
- Top Scorer: David Seal (Sydney Croatia) - 15 goals
- Coach of the Year: Bertie Mariani (Marconi Fairfield)

== Other sources ==
- Australia - List of final tables (RSSSF)
- NSL awards at ozfootball.net
