= 1993–94 National Soccer League =

Australian soccer season

NSL 1993-94
- League: National Soccer League
- Sport: Association football
- Duration: 1993–94
- Number of teams: 14

NSL season
- Champions: Adelaide City
- Top scorer: Mark Viduka (16)

National Soccer League seasons
- ← 1992–93 1994–95 →

The 1993–94 National Soccer League season, was the 18th season of the National Soccer League in Australia.

== Regular season ==
=== League table ===
Pos	Team	Pld	W	D	L	GF	GA	GD	Pts	Qualification
1	Melbourne Knights	26	16	5	5	59	24	+35	53	Qualification for the Finals series
2	South Melbourne	26	13	8	5	39	20	+19	47	Qualification for the Finals series
3	Sydney United	26	13	7	6	31	29	+2	46	Qualification for the Finals series
4	Marconi Fairfield	26	11	9	6	52	33	+19	42	Qualification for the Finals series
5	Adelaide City (C)	26	11	8	7	48	27	+21	41	Qualification for the Finals series
6	Sydney Olympic	26	11	8	7	40	37	+3	41	Qualification for the Finals series
7	Morwell Falcons	26	11	7	8	31	30	+1	40	
8	Brisbane Strikers	26	10	6	10	28	25	+3	36	
9	West Adelaide	26	10	5	11	41	34	+7	35	
10	Parramatta Eagles	26	8	9	9	27	29	−2	33	
11	Wollongong City	26	6	9	11	24	32	−8	27	
12	Newcastle Breakers	26	5	8	13	30	47	−17	23	
13	Brunswick Pumas	26	5	4	17	22	57	−35	19	
14	Heidelberg United	26	3	5	18	19	67	−48	14	

Updated to match(es) played on unknown. Source: rsssf.com
Rules for classification: 1) points; 2) goal difference; 3) number of goals scored.
(C) Champions

== Finals series ==
Elimination finals
3	Sydney United	1	0	(2)
5	Adelaide City	0	2	(2)
4	Marconi Fairfield	1	3	(4)
6	Sydney Olympic	2	1	(3)

Semifinals
1	Melbourne Knights	2	2	(4)
2	South Melbourne	1	2	(3)
Marconi Fairfield	1
Adelaide City	3

Preliminary final
South Melbourne	0
Adelaide City	2

Grand final
Melbourne Knights	0
Adelaide City	1

== Individual awards ==
- Player of the Year: Mark Viduka (Melbourne Knights)
- U-21 Player of the Year: Mark Viduka (Melbourne Knights)
- Top Scorer: Mark Viduka (Melbourne Knights) – 16 goals
- Coach of the Year: Mirko Bazic (Melbourne Knights)
