= Adelaide City FC =

Association football club in South Australia

Adelaide City
- Full name: Adelaide City Football Club
- Nicknames: Zebras, Black and Whites, Juventus
- Founded: 1946; 80 years ago
- Ground: Adelaide City Park
- Capacity: 5,500
- Chairman: Angelo Carrozza
- Head coach: Vas Parhas
- League: NPL South Australia
- 2026: 1st of 12, (premiers & champions)
- Website: adelaidecityfc.com.au
Home colours	Away colours

Adelaide City Football Club is a semi-professional soccer club based in Oakden, a north-eastern suburb of Adelaide. The club was a founding member of the now-defunct National Soccer League and currently competes in the National Premier Leagues South Australia.

The club was founded in 1946 by Adelaide's Italian community, who named the club Juventus. Adelaide City was one of 14 founding members of the National Soccer League in 1977 and competed concurrently in every edition of the competition before withdrawing a few weeks before the beginning of the league's final season. The club is one of Australia's most successful, their first major silverware coming in 1979 when they defeated St George in the NSL Cup final. Under legendary manager Zoran Matić, they won three National Soccer League titles in 1986, 1992 and 1994, alongside two further cup wins in 1989 and 1992. The club also became the first Australian representative to win a continental title, when they defeated Mount Wellington on penalties in the 1987 Oceania Club Championship final. City is also the most successful club in South Australian competitions, winning 19 first-division titles and 18 Federation Cups, including five in a row from 1969 until 1973. The club reached the quarter-finals of the inaugural FFA Cup, which included a 1–0 over A-League side and reigning AFC Champions League champions, Western Sydney Wanderers, in the round of 32, becoming the first member federation club to defeat an A-League club in the competition.

Adelaide City has historically been one of the most prolific producers of players selected for the Australian national team, with the club providing the third most Socceroos of any NSL club behind Marconi and South Melbourne; notable Adelaide City players who have gone on to represent Australia include John and Ross Aloisi, Aurelio and Tony Vidmar, Sergio Melta, John Perin, Milan Ivanović, Bugsy Nyskohus and Alex Tobin. Former City NSL striker and current coach Damian Mori holds the record for the most goals scored in the national domestic league with 240 – 131 of which were scored in City colours. Tobin holds the record for playing the most senior games in Australian domestic competition with 522, including 436 for City.

== History ==
=== Origins and early years ===
The club was founded in a back room of the Bailetti sports store on Hindley Street, Adelaide by the shop's owner Mario Bailetti and a small group of former members of a club called Savoia. Supported primarily by members of the city's Italian community, the club was originally called Juventus after the Italian club in 1946 and subsequently renamed Adelaide Juventus in 1960. Bailetti served as chairman for the first 14 years of the club's existence and, after also serving in senior executive roles with the South Australian Soccer Federation, later had the western grandstand of Hindmarsh Stadium named in his honour.

Juventus began life in the second division of South Australian soccer, winning promotion at its first attempt. However, Juventus was relegated straight back to the second tier in 1947, where it remained for another two years. In 1949, Juventus was promoted again and it has remained at the highest level of South Australian soccer ever since, save for several seasons during the club's National Soccer League stint. Early star players included Italian post-war migrant Fulvio Pagani, a fullback who was also selected for the Australian national team.

The first of many state championships arrived in 1953. This was followed by another five titles before the end of the 1950s including an unprecedented four in-a-row between 1956 and 1959. Between 1953 and 1959, the club won 106 of 127 games and six of the seven championships it contested. An additional three South Australian championships were won in the 1960s and three more titles were won in the 1970s up until 1976. The club's original home was Kensington Oval, Adelaide, then known as Olympic Sports Field.

During the club's formative years, there were already signs of its potential on the national stage. Adelaide Juventus competed in the inaugural Australia Cup in 1962, finishing third in the national knockout tournament. Its cup run produced wins over eventual national league rivals, Brisbane Azzurri and Sydney Hakoah, before it was denied a place in the final courtesy of a 3–0 loss to St George Budapest in front of 5000 spectators at Hindmarsh Stadium. Juventus reached the semi-finals of the Australia Cup again in 1963, this time having its final hopes dashed by eventual champion Port Melbourne Slavia. The club competed in all but the last edition of the tournament in 1968 but never again progressed beyond the quarter-finals.

=== Entering the National Soccer League ===
Chart of yearly table positions for Adelaide City in NSL

In 1977, the club renamed itself Adelaide City and became a founding member of the inaugural NSL competition; Australia's first national league of any football code. The team was captained by Frank Lister, who was later inducted into the South Australian Soccer Hall of Fame in 2004. The club's inaugural NSL coach was Edmund Kreft. Roger Romanowicz, Ron Fraser, Fred Yung, Zoran Matić, Lister, John Perin, David Leane, Sergio Melta, Brian Northcote, John Nyskohus and Gary Marocchi started for the Black and Whites in their first-ever national league clash, a 0–0 draw against the Brisbane Lions at Olympic Sports Field, watched by 6320 people.

City finished fourth in the first-ever NSL season, six points behind eventual champion Eastern Suburbs, later renamed Sydney City. One of the main proponents of the NSL concept, City recorded the league's highest average attendance of 7400 in its first season. The club was also responsible for bringing one of the new league's star recruits to Australian shores in former Celtic striker Dixie Deans, who topped the goalscoring charts in the inaugural NSL season with 16 goals. The Scottish international signed on a $25,000 contract and scored his first goal for the club in a 4–1 derby win over West Adelaide in front of 12,000 fans. Deans remained with City until 1980. One of the club's other highlights from the first NSL season was a 10–3 win over Victorian club Mooroolbark. The game remains the only time an Australian club side has scored 10 goals in a national league match.

The second NSL season was less successful for City. They finished 10th in a 14-team competition and drew a crucial game at the end of the season that allowed their biggest rivals, West Adelaide, to claim the title. That final round match played at Hindmarsh Stadium, attracted a crowd of 16,251.

The club reached the final of the NSL Cup in 1978 but lost to the Lions in Brisbane. The following year, City won its first national level silverware, defeating St George Budapest 3–1 in front of 9554 fans at Olympic Sports Field.

In 1979, City also faced a New York Cosmos side featuring Dutch star Johan Neeskens and German legend Franz Beckenbauer in a friendly at Olympic Sports Field, which attracted a crowd of more than 28,000.

City remained a mid-table side for the following few seasons. In 1984, the NSL was expanded and split into Northern and Southern conferences.City played in the Southern Conference, alongside clubs from Victoria, South Australia and Queensland.

=== First national championship ===
In 1986, the club appointed former player Zoran Matić as its new coach; a decision that would lead to the side becoming a powerhouse for more than a decade. City reached the finals that season for the first time after finishing third in the southern conference. In a qualifying final, City travelled to Melbourne and beat second-placed Footscray JUST 3–2. They backed up that win by returning to Melbourne and defeating Southern Conference champion Brunswick Juventus 2–0 in the semi-finals. The Southern final pit City against Footscray JUST again and the club won its third straight finals clash away from home, 2–1.

City then faced the Northern Conference champion, Sydney Olympic, at Hindmarsh Stadium in the first leg of the NSL grand final. Despite losing 1–0 in front of 12,232 home fans, City travelled to Sydney the following week and defeated the Greek community-backed Olympic 3–1 at Parramatta Stadium to be crowned Australian champions for the first time. The club's first championship captain Bugsy Nyskohus also became the first player to play 300 NSL games.

Remarkably, City's first championship side included nine home-grown South Australians in Nyskohus, Paul Shillabeer, Alex Tobin, Charlie Villani, Adrian Santrac, Sergio Melta, Aurelio Vidmar, Steve Maxwell and Joe Mullen.

Championship glory qualified City to play in the first-ever Oceania Club Championship in 1987. In reality, the tournament was a one-off game for City, which faced off against 1986 New Zealand National Soccer League winners University-Mount Wellington. In front of 3500 fans at Hindmarsh Stadium, City beat UniMount on penalties after a 1–1 draw, Mullen having scored the home side's goal. The Oceania championship would not be held again until 1999.

The NSL returned to a single conference, 14-team competition the following season and City disappointed, backing up its championship season with a 10th-place finish. It would not be until the 1989–90 season, when the NSL switched to summertime, that the Adelaide club returned to the finals series. However, they were eliminated at the first hurdle at home by Sydney Olympic.

=== Golden era ===
City enjoyed its finest years during the 1990s. The club finished third in the 1990–91 season, four points behind Melbourne Croatia. In the finals, they faced South Melbourne Hellas away from home, losing 4–2 in Melbourne. City, which had a double chance due to its top three finish, rebounded and beat Marconi-Fairfield 1–0 at home thanks to a 93rd minute Joe Mullen goal. However, in the preliminary final, South Melbourne's Paul Trimboli scored the only goal to break City hearts. South went on to win the grand final on penalties against arch-rivals Melbourne Croatia. City's season was recognised with individual awards to its star defender, Milan Ivanović, who was named NSL Player of the Year after arriving from Yugoslav giants Red Star Belgrade, and Coach of the Year Zoran Matić.

The following season saw City win its second championship. While the club finished fourth after the home-and-away rounds, its reputation as a finals specialist continued to become stronger. A Carl Veart goal gave the Zebras a 1–0 win over Wollongong City at Hindmarsh. Veart then scored twice away from home, including an extra time winner, against Sydney Olympic. Goals from Veart, his fourth of the finals campaign, and rising star Ross Aloisi gave City a 2–0 win over South Melbourne at Olympic Park. A 0–0 draw in the grand final against Melbourne Croatia went City's favour, as they won on penalties to claim their second NSL title. Croatia had lost two grand finals in two years on penalties to rival clubs.

Adelaide City narrowly failed to go back-to-back in the 1992–93 season, losing the grand final 1–0 to Marconi after finishing third on the ladder. City had defeated their biggest rivals West Adelaide and South Melbourne to reach the decider.

The following season, the Zebras reclaimed their national title. Despite finishing fifth on the table, City was able to reach the grand final by downing powerhouses Sydney United, Marconi and South Melbourne. Its biggest finals performers included a young Damian Mori, who went on to become one of Australia's greatest ever goalscorers, Brad Hassell and Tony Vidmar. City faced the Melbourne Knights in the grand final at Melbourne's Olympic Park. Mori scored the only goal of the game, giving City their third championship against his former club, which had now lost three grand finals in four seasons.

1994 NSL grand final starting lineup Melbourne Knights 0 – 1 Adelaide City

The Croatian-backed Knights exacted revenge on City the following season, edging them out by one point to top the table after the regular season. City then beat Knights over two legs in the semi-finals to secure a home grand final. Knights beat their rivals South Melbourne to qualify for the grand final. The patch pit that season's two top goalscorers against one another, the Knights' Mark Viduka having scored 18 goals and City's Damian Mori 17. In front of more than 16,000 fans, the Knights defeated Adelaide City for the first time in South Australia to claim their first national title. Despite the loss, Matić was again named Coach of the Year.

City made the finals in each of the following six seasons but failed to reach another grand final. Its run of 11 consecutive finals series stands as a national record. Damian Mori won the first of his three top goalscorer awards for City in 1996, with 31 goals for the season. His goalscoring efforts also saw him named Player of the Year.

=== Final NSL years ===
The club rebranded itself as the Adelaide Force going into the 2000–01 season, in an effort to promote themselves beyond Adelaide's Italian community, from where they had drawn their traditional support. City missed the finals in their first season as the Force and finished second-last the following year, their worst ever NSL season. It was the club's first season without star striker Mori, who signed for Perth Glory after he received an offer to become a full-time professional. Mori remained with the West Australian club until the NSL folded in 2004, after which he returned to City.

Going into the 2002–03 season, which was to be their last in the NSL, City recruited Italian striker Claudio Pelosi who had previously spent a two-year stint at the club. Pelosi's goals helped City return to the finals series. The NSL changed its finals format to a round-robin competition played over 10 matches between the top six. Minor round premiers, Olympic Sharks were given a six-point advantage and despite City's valiant finals efforts, they finished two points shy of the Sharks and a berth in the grand final.

City's final NSL match saw them beat Northern Spirit 6–0 in front of 3,833 home fans at Hindmarsh Stadium.

On 31 August 2003, after 27 seasons in the NSL, Adelaide City announced its departure from the national league because of financial difficulties. The club returned to only fielding sides in the South Australian state competition the following year.

=== Return to state competition ===
City competed in the South Australian competitions even while its senior side played in the NSL. However, after its departure from the national league, City's top side enjoyed a successful return to the state leagues. In 2005, the club won the Premier League grand final, despite finishing seven points shy of the North Eastern MetroStars during the regular season.

Adelaide City completed the treble in 2006 winning three trophies, the pre-season Errea Cup, the 2006 FFSA Super League (a rebranded SA Premier League) and the FFSA Adelaide United Cup. City met Raiders in the Errea Cup final in what was a rematch of the previous season's Grand Final. City breezed through winning 5–0. In the Super League, City fought off tough competition for the majority of the year and ended the season three games clear on top of the table with a healthy goal difference. City then went on to win the FFSA Adelaide United Cup with a comprehensive 4–1 victory over Adelaide Blue Eagles. Striker Jonathan Negus scored a hat-trick and won the John Kosmina Medal awarded to the best on ground.

Damian Mori, now coach of City, led the club to its third and fourth straight South Australian titles in the 2007 season and 2008 season. The club lost to MetroStars in the 2009 grand final, preventing them from claiming five championships in a row. However, they defeated Adelaide Blue Eagles to win the SA title again in 2010—their fifth in six seasons with Mori as coach. Blue Eagles exacted revenge the following year, defeating City on penalties in the grand final. City also lost the 2012 grand final to MetroStars.

In 2014, City won the Federation Cup defeating old NSL rivals West Adelaide 4–1 in the final at Hindmarsh Stadium.

On 12 August that year, Adelaide City played Western Sydney Wanderers in the round of 32 of the 2014 FFA Cup. The Wanderers team featured players such as Nikolai Topor-Stanley, Ante Čović and Tomi Juric and were overwhelming favourites to progress. With 15 minutes left, and the scores tied at 0–0, City midfielder Thomas Love went on a solo run, beating several players and scored the winning goal for Adelaide City. The victory was a massive result for the club who were the first semi-professional side to defeat an A-League side in what was the first ever season of the FFA Cup. Adelaide managed to progress to the quarter-finals of the tournament, beating Brisbane Strikers 1–0 in the round of 16, not before being eliminated by Bentleigh Greens in a 2–1 extra-time loss.

City returned to the South Australian National Premier Leagues grand final in 2016 but, despite having topped the regular season table, lost to Campbelltown City and failed to claim its first South Australian championship since 2011.

17 February 2018 was a memorable day in the club history when city rivals South Adelaide were defeated with 10–0.

== Colours, badge and nicknames ==
Adelaide City was founded as Juventus in 1946. To this day, it retains the Juventus, or Juve nickname. Its traditional playing strip harks back to the Italian club's black and white stripes. Because of this iconic design, City have also been known as the Black and Whites.

The club's initial attempt to don the famous black and white stripes of Italian club Juventus were thwarted when the South Australian Soccer Federation ruled that there could only be one black and white team per league and the black and white of Port Adelaide took precedence. Juventus thus first wore a navy blue strip with a white "J" before finally being permitted to wear black and white stripes from 1949.

When the NSL was formed in 1977, Adelaide City's badge included the Italian tricolour, as well as its now iconic kangaroo and zebra symbol. The tricolour remained until 1996, when governing body Soccer Australia introduced controversial policies requiring clubs to remove all traces of their ethnic heritage from names and symbols. Former Soccer Australia chairman David Hill threatened clubs with expulsion if they refused.

During the 1990s, City was also known for several seasons as the Zebras. The club's logo bore the Zebras moniker for a few seasons after it was forced to remove the Italian tricolour. City then adopted the name Adelaide City Force for its final four seasons in the NSL. During its time using the Force moniker, City added orange trim to its home strip and also used the colour in its away uniforms. Upon leaving the national competition, City ceased to be known as the Force and reverted to its traditional Juve or Black and Whites nicknames and traditional colour scheme.

The club's current logo features a kangaroo and a zebra, paying homage to its Australian and Italian heritage, along with three stars representing each of its national championships.

== Stadium ==
The club plays its home games at Adelaide City Park in Oakden, a suburb 12 km north-east of the Adelaide city centre.

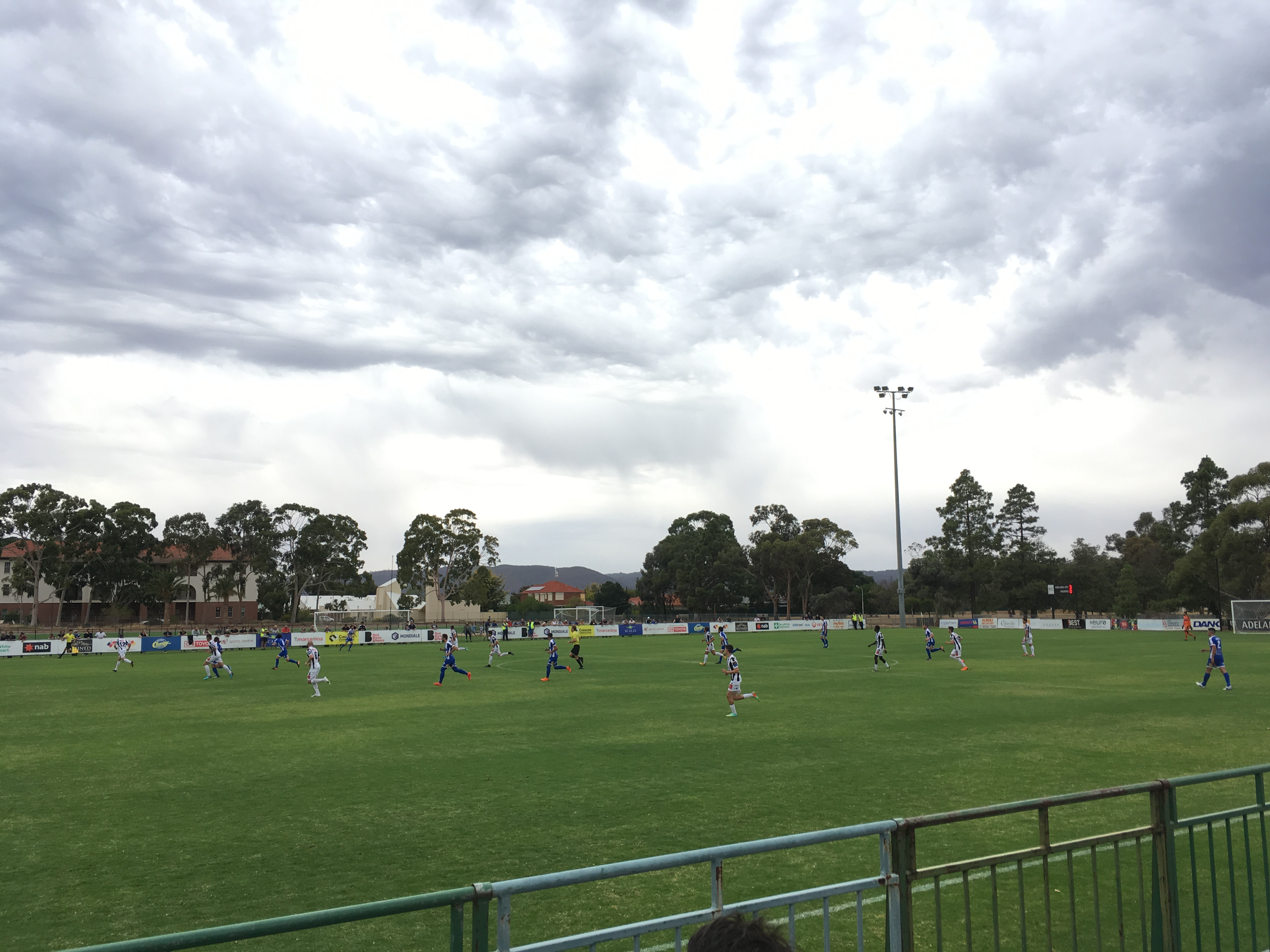
An NPL match between Adelaide City and West Adelaide at Adelaide City Park

During its National Soccer League days, City first played games at Olympic Sports Field in the inner-eastern suburb of Kensington, before playing at Hindmarsh Stadium – South Australia's purpose-built soccer stadium.

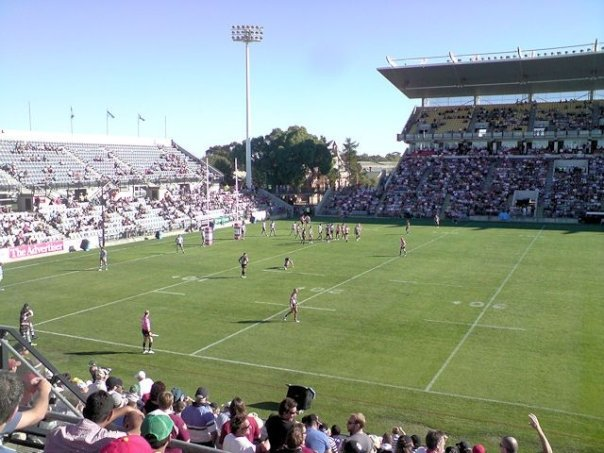
From 1986 until its NSL exit in 2003, City played home games at Hindmarsh Stadium.

== Adelaide City Women ==
Adelaide City Women is the club's women's team.

== Supporters ==
Adelaide City has traditionally drawn its support from the broader Italian community of Adelaide, South Australia. While based in the north-eastern suburbs, its lengthy history as a National Soccer League side means it has supporters based right across the city. For six seasons, it was Adelaide's only representative at the national level.

== Rivalries ==
=== Adelaide United FC ===
Not since their induction into the NSL in 2003 & subsequent A-League Men competition has Adelaide United ever faced against City in professional competition. That all changed when the two teams played against each other in the Round of 16 of the 2022 Australia Cup at ServiceFM Stadium in front of a crowd of 3,327. Both teams played out a 2-2 draw after extra-time with the game going to a penalty shoot-out. United eventually won 4-1 on penalties, with two saves by Joe Gauci preventing City's Jai King & Zak Waters from converting their shots into the back of the net.

=== West Adelaide SC ===
The club's greatest rival is West Adelaide, a club traditionally backed by Adelaide's Greek community and with whom City contests the Adelaide derby. The Italians and Greeks were among the largest migrant communities of South Australia and were strong supporters of their clubs, then called Juventus and Hellas respectively, when both entered the National Soccer League upon its foundation in 1977. West was the first Adelaide club to win a national title in 1978 before City claimed its three titles in the following two decades. Matches between Juventus and Hellas traditionally drew strong crowds, until the latter, then named Adelaide Sharks, withdrew from the NSL and ceased playing senior soccer at any level in 1999. In 2008, West Adelaide revived its senior soccer side and resumed playing in the South Australian league, reigniting a once-great derby. In 2014, the two sides faced off in the Federation Cup final, which City won 4–1.

=== Other rivalries ===
Adelaide City's other great rivals include the Melbourne Knights. The two sides enjoyed their greatest eras in the 1990s and faced off in three grand finals in four seasons. City won two of those finals, both played in Melbourne, while the Croatian-backed Knights defeated Adelaide City for the first time in Adelaide to win the 1995 championship. The two sides have not played since 2003, when Adelaide City left the NSL. Knights now play in the National Premier Leagues Victoria.

During its time in the NSL, City enjoyed hard-fought, healthy rivalries with the league's other traditionally big clubs, Greek-backed South Melbourne and Sydney Olympic, Italian-backed Marconi and Croatian-backed Sydney United.

Since returning to the South Australian competition, City's biggest rivals have included other Italian-backed and north-eastern suburbs clubs, Adelaide Blue Eagles, Campbelltown City and the MetroStars.

== Players ==
=== Current squad ===
As of 15 October 2026

Note: Flags indicate national team as defined under FIFA eligibility rules; some limited exceptions apply. Players may hold more than one non-FIFA nationality.

No.	Pos.	Nation	Player
1	GK	AUS	John Hall
4	DF	AUS	Lewis Killoh
5	DF	AUS	Noah Smith
6	DF	AUS	Jean-Paul Mbembe
7	MF	AUS	Daniel Bressan
8	DF	AUS	Yared Abetew
9	FW	AUS	Matthew Dawber
10	MF	AUS	Nicholas Bucco (Captain)
11	MF	AUS	Bruce Kamau
12	MF	AUS	Nicholas Francese
14	FW	AUS	Binyam Kebede
17	DF	AUS	Peter Akot

No.	Pos.	Nation	Player
19	DF	AUS	Isaac Martini
20	FW	JPN	Yuki Kitano
21	DF	AUS	Fergus Lynch
22	DF	ARG	Juan Gutierrez
23	MF	AUS	Vianne Kurikwimana
25	FW	AUS	Luis Lawrie-Lattanzio
28	DF	AUS	Luca Uhlmann
32	DF	AUS	Giuseppe Baldino
41	GK	AUS	George Zacharias
46	DF	AUS	Oliver Western
47	FW	AUS	Asad Kasumovic
51	GK	AUS	Fraser Nisbet
80	MF	AUS	Patrick Caraccia

== Managers ==
- (Poland) Edmund Kreft (1977–78)
- (Australia) Les Scheinflug (1978)
- (Australia) Rale Rasić (1979–80)
- (Australia) Bob D'Ottavi (1981)
- (Australia) John Perin (1982)
- (Scotland) Robert Ferguson (1983)
- (Poland) Edmund Kreft (1984–85)
- (Australia) Zoran Matić (1986–95)
- (Australia) John Perin (1995–96)
- (Australia) John Nyskohus (1996–98)
- (Australia) Zoran Matić (1998–02)
- (Australia) Charley Villani (2002)
- (Australia) Bob D'Ottavi (2002)
- (Australia) Zoran Matić (2002–03)
- (Australia) Damian Mori (2005–09)
- (Australia) Charley Villani (2010)
- (Australia) Damian Mori (2011–18)
- (Australia) Michael Matricciani (2019–2020)
- (Australia) Paul Pezos (2020–2024)
- (Australia) Vas Parhas (2024-Present)

== Honours ==
Continental

- Oceania Club Championship
  - Winners (1): 1987

National

- National Soccer League Champions
  - Winners (3): 1986, 1992, 1994
  - Runners-up (2): 1993, 1995
- NSL Cup
  - Winners (3): 1979, 1989, 1991–92
  - Runners-up (1): 1978

State Leagues

- First Division / Premier League / Super League / NPL South Australia Champions
  - Winners (20): 1953, 1954, 1956, 1957, 1958, 1959, 1963, 1964, 1967, 1970, 1972, 1974, 2005, 2006, 2007, 2008, 2010, 2021, 2022, 2026
  - Runners-up (16): 1950, 1952, 1955, 1961, 1962, 1966, 1971, 1973, 1975, 1976, 2009, 2011, 2012, 2016, 2017, 2018
- Premier League / Super League / NPL South Australia Premiers
  - Winners (4): 2008, 2016, 2022, 2026
  - Runners-up (2): 2005, 2011
- Second Division / State League / Premier League / SA State League 1 Champions
  - Winners (4): 1946, 1949, 1987, 1999
  - Runners-up (2): 1982, 1983
- Third Division / State League / SA State League 2 Champions
  - Winners (1): 1978

State Cups

- Federation Cup
  - Winners (18): 1953, 1955, 1957, 1958, 1959, 1963, 1965, 1969, 1970, 1971, 1972, 1973, 1976, 2006, 2007, 2013, 2014, 2022
  - Runners-up (8): 1951, 1967, 1968, 2008, 2015, 2017, 2019, 2021
- First Division Cup
  - Winners (4): 1953, 1955, 1956, 1959
  - Runners-up (1): 1952
- Second Division Cup
  - Runners-up (2): 1946, 1949
- Third Division Cup
  - Winners (1): 1978
- Top Four Cup
  - Winners (3): 1971, 1972, 1973
  - Runners-up (2): 1970, 1976
- Summer Night Series
  - Winners (18): 1955, 1956, 1958, 1959, 1960, 1962, 1967, 1974, 1981, 1985, 1986, 1987, 1991, 1992 March, 1992 September, 1994, 1995, 2006
  - Runners-up (5): 1966, 1968, 1972, 1982, 1983
- Pre-season Cup
  - Winners (5): 1955, 1956, 1958, 1961, 1963

== See also ==
- List of sports clubs inspired by others

Preceded by Brunswick Juventus	NSL Champions; 1986	Succeeded by APIA Leichhardt
Preceded by South Melbourne	NSL Champions; 1991/92	Succeeded by Marconi Stallions
Preceded by Marconi Stallions	NSL Champions; 1993/94	Succeeded by Melbourne Knights

FIFA Oceania Club Championship 1987 Winners
(Australia)
Adelaide City
First title
