= 1982 Adelaide City FC season =

Adelaide City
1982 season
- President: Lou Ravesi
- Manager: Bob D'Ottavi; John Perin
- Stadium: Hindmarsh Stadium; Olympic Sports Field
- National Soccer League: 13th
- NSL Cup: First round
- Top goalscorer: John Nyskohus (10)
- Highest home attendance: 4,100 vs. West Adelaide (22 August 1982); National Soccer League
- Lowest home attendance: 1,500 vs. Preston Makedonia (25 July 1982); National Soccer League
- Average home league attendance: 2,692
- Biggest win: 3–0 vs. St George-Budapest (H) (21 March 1982); National Soccer League; 3–0 vs. Wollongong City (H) (25 April 1982); National Soccer League; 3–0 vs. South Melbourne (A) (2 May 1982); National Soccer League
- Biggest defeat: 1–6 vs. Sydney City (A) (15 August 1982); National Soccer League

The 1982 season was the sixth in the National Soccer League for Adelaide City Football Club. In addition to the domestic league, they also participated in the NSL Cup. Adelaide City finished 13th in their National Soccer League season, and were eliminated in the first round of the NSL Cup.

== Players ==
Note: Flags indicate national team as defined under FIFA eligibility rules; some limited exceptions apply. Players may hold more than one non-FIFA nationality.

No.	Pos.	Nation	Player
—	DF	ENG	Neil Banfield
—	FW	ENG	Les Carter
—		AUS	Mario Carusco
—	DF	NZL	Glen Dods
—	GK	SCO	Bobby Ferguson
—	DF	ENG	Neville Flounders
—		AUS	Noel Flounders
—	DF	AUS	Chris Manou
—	MF	ITA	Sergio Marangoni
—	MF	AUS	Gary Marocchi
—	GK	NIR	Willie McNally
—	MF	AUS	Sergio Melta

No.	Pos.	Nation	Player
—	DF	AUS	Chris Miller
—	FW	AUS	Dave Mitchell
—	MF	AUS	Brian Northcote
—	DF	AUS	Bugsy Nyskohus
—	FW	AUS	John Nyskohus
—	MF	AUS	John Perin
—	FW	AUS	Peter Rankin
—	DF	SCO	Bobby Rusell
—	DF	AUS	Paul Shillabeer
—	FW	AUS	Luciano Signore
—	MF	AUS	Charlie Villani

== Competitions ==
=== Overall record ===
Competition	First match	Last match	Starting round	Final position	Record							
Competition	First match	Last match	Starting round	Final position	Pld	W	D	L	GF	GA	GD	Win %
National Soccer League	14 February 1982	5 September 1982	Matchday 1	13th	30	6	12	12	36	44	−8	20.00
NSL Cup	14 June 1982		First round	First round	1	0	0	1	1	3	−2	0.00
Total					31	6	12	13	37	47	−10	19.35

Source: Competitions

=== National Soccer League ===
==== League table ====
Pos	Team	Pld	W	D	L	GF	GA	GD	Pts	Relegation
1	Sydney City (C)	30	20	5	5	68	28	+40	45	Qualification to Finals series (Note: The Finals series was not considered the championship for the 1982 National Soccer League.)
2	St George-Budapest	30	14	8	8	47	40	+7	36	Qualification to Finals series
3	Wollongong City	30	16	3	11	43	46	−3	35	Qualification to Finals series
4	Heidelberg United	30	13	8	9	42	37	+5	34	Qualification to Finals series
5	Preston Makedonia	30	12	10	8	45	41	+4	34	
6	South Melbourne	30	11	9	10	46	37	+9	31	
7	APIA Leichhardt	30	12	7	11	49	54	−5	31	
8	Sydney Olympic	30	12	6	12	52	42	+10	30	
9	West Adelaide	30	10	8	12	44	40	+4	28	
10	Marconi Fairfield	30	12	4	14	44	43	+1	28	
11	Brisbane Lions	30	10	8	12	39	42	−3	28	
12	Newcastle KB United	30	10	7	13	43	52	−9	27	
13	Adelaide City	30	6	12	12	36	44	−8	24	
14	Footscray JUST	30	5	14	11	34	46	−12	24	
15	Canberra City	30	7	10	13	37	54	−17	24	
16	Brisbane City	30	5	11	14	32	55	−23	21	

Source: rsssf.com
Rules for classification: 1) points; 2) goal difference; 3) number of goals scored.
(C) Champions

==== Results summary ====
Overall								Home						Away					
Pld	W	D	L	GF	GA	GD	Pts	W	D	L	GF	GA	GD	W	D	L	GF	GA	GD
30	6	12	12	36	44	−8	30	4	9	2	18	12	+6	2	3	10	18	32	−14

Source: worldfootball.net

==== Results by round ====
Round	1	2	3	4	5	6	7	8	9	10	11	12	13	14	15	16	17	18	19	20	21	22	23	24	25	26	27	28	29	30
Ground	A	H	A	H	A	H	H	A	H	A	H	A	H	A	H	A	H	A	H	A	A	H	A	H	A	H	A	H	A	H
Result	D	D	L	D	L	W	L	L	L	L	W	W	D	L	D	D	W	L	D	D	W	D	L	D	L	D	L	D	L	W
Position	7	10	12	12	13	10	12	13	14	15	14	12	11	14	14	14	14	14	14	14	13	11	13	12	13	14	15	15	15	13
Points	1	2	2	3	3	5	5	5	5	5	7	9	10	10	11	12	14	14	15	16	18	19	19	20	20	21	21	22	22	24

Source: worldfootball.net
A = Away; H = Home; W = Win; D = Draw; L = Loss

==== Matches ====
Win Draw Loss

14 February 1982 1	Brisbane City	1–1	Adelaide City	Brisbane
	Pimblett 40'	Report	J. Nyskohus 58'	Stadium: Spencer Park; Attendance: 3,700; Referee: Tim Davies

21 February 1982 2	Adelaide City	0–0	Footscray JUST	Adelaide
		Report		Stadium: Hindmarsh Stadium; Attendance: 2,800; Referee: Graham Neal

28 February 1982 3	Canberra City	3–1	Adelaide City	Canberra
	Purdie 57'; Gibson 66'; MacLaren 81'	Report	J. Nyskohus 84'	Stadium: Bruce Stadium; Attendance: 2,200; Referee: Ken Allen

7 March 1982 4	Adelaide City	2–2	Newcastle KB United	Adelaide
	J. Nyskohus 28'; Northcote 67'	Report	Jones 58', 76'	Stadium: Hindmarsh Stadium; Attendance: 3,200; Referee: Don Campbell

13 March 1982 5	Heidelberg United	2–1	Adelaide City	Melbourne
	Cole 29'; Campbell 49'	Report	Northcote 21'	Stadium: Olympic Park; Attendance: 2,500; Referee: Jim Fearn

21 March 1982 6	Adelaide City	3–0	St George-Budapest	Adelaide
	Mitchell 45', 47'; Melta 70'	Report		Stadium: Hindmarsh Stadium; Attendance: 3,200; Referee: Bob Kerr

28 March 1982 7	Adelaide City	2–3	Sydney Olympic	Adelaide
	Mitchell 27'; Nyskohus 65'	Report	Raskopoulos 36'; K. Wilson 54', 60'	Stadium: Olympic Sports Field; Attendance: 3,564; Referee: Graham Neal

4 April 1982 8	Marconi Fairfield	1–0	Adelaide City	Sydney
	Henderson 27'	Report		Stadium: Marconi Stadium; Attendance: 2,281; Referee: Ken Small

11 April 1982 9	Adelaide City	0–2	Brisbane Lions	Adelaide
		Report	Millman 4', 44'	Stadium: Olympic Sports Field; Attendance: 3,100; Referee: Jim Rossis

18 April 1982 10	Preston Makedonia	2–1	Adelaide City	Melbourne
	Ollerton 42' (pen.), 85'	Report	J. Nyskohus 35' (pen.)	Stadium: B.T. Connor Reserve; Attendance: 2,500; Referee: Chris Bambridge

25 April 1982 11	Adelaide City	3–0	Wollongong City	Adelaide
	Melta 49'; Villani 74'; Northcote 88'	Report		Stadium: Olympic Sports Field; Attendance: 2,320; Referee: Don Campbell

2 May 1982 12	South Melbourne	0–3	Adelaide City	Melbourne
		Report	J. Nyskohus 5', 73'; Villani 49'	Stadium: Middle Park Soccer Stadium; Attendance: 4,000; Referee: David Yelland

9 May 1982 13	Adelaide City	0–0	Sydney City	Adelaide
		Report		Stadium: Olympic Sports Field; Attendance: 3,600; Referee: Stewart Mellings

16 May 1982 14	West Adelaide	2–1	Adelaide City	Adelaide
	Honeyman 30'; Atsalas 85'	Report	J. Nyskohus 76'	Stadium: Hindmarsh Stadium; Attendance: 8,325; Referee: Don Campbell

23 May 1982 15	Adelaide City	1–1	APIA Leichhardt	Adelaide
	Melta 50'	Report	Soper 35'	Stadium: Olympic Sports Field; Attendance: 3,120; Referee: Bob Kerr

30 May 1982 16	Footscray JUST	2–2	Adelaide City	Melbourne
	Belic 13'; Kondarios 65'	Report	Rusell 41'; Melta 75'	Stadium: Schintler Reserve; Attendance: 2,500; Referee: Chris Bambridge

6 June 1982 17	Adelaide City	2–0	Brisbane City	Adelaide
	Rusell 41'; Flounders 52'	Report		Stadium: Olympic Sports Field; Attendance: 2,200; Referee: Jim Rossis

12 June 1982 18	Newcastle KB United	2–0	Adelaide City	Newcastle
	Jones 19'; Johnston 74'	Report		Stadium: Newcastle International Sports Centre; Attendance: 10,351; Referee: Tim Davies

20 June 1982 19	Adelaide City	1–1	Canberra City	Adelaide
	J. Nyskohus 87'	Report	Purdie 62'	Stadium: Olympic Sports Field; Attendance: 1,900; Referee: Bob Kerr

27 June 1982 20	St George-Budapest	2–2	Adelaide City	Sydney
	Slater 28'; Marton 54'	Report	Duarte 6' (o.g.); Melta 81'	Stadium: St George Stadium; Attendance: 1,545; Referee: Peter Rampley

4 July 1982 21	Sydney Olympic	1–3	Adelaide City	Sydney
	Koussas 28'	Report	Villani 19', 44'; Manou 87'	Stadium: Pratten Park; Attendance: 4,457; Referee: Tim Davies

11 July 1982 22	Adelaide City	0–0	Marconi Fairfield	Adelaide
		Report		Stadium: Olympic Sports Field; Attendance: 2,600; Referee: Don Campbell

18 July 1982 23	Brisbane Lions	2–0	Adelaide City	Brisbane
	Hogg 38'; Millman 40'	Report		Stadium: Richlands Stadium; Attendance: 800; Referee: Bill Monteverde

25 July 1982 24	Adelaide City	0–0	Preston Makedonia	Adelaide
		Report		Stadium: Olympic Sports Field; Attendance: 1,500; Referee: Bob Kerr

1 August 1982 25	Wollongong City	2–1	Adelaide City	Wollongong
	O'Connor 30', 85'	Report	Nyskohus 64'	Stadium: Wollongong Showground; Attendance: 3,200; Referee: Doug Rennie

8 August 1982 26	Adelaide City	1–1	South Melbourne	Adelaide
	Manou 70'	Report	Egan 11'	Stadium: Olympic Sports Field; Attendance: 1,200; Referee: Don Campbell

15 August 1982 27	Sydney City	6–1	Adelaide City	Sydney
	Patikas 10', 21'; Mitchell 25', 54'; Kosmina 40'; Boden 82'	Report	Carter 62'	Stadium: ES Marks Athletics Field; Attendance: 1,158; Referee: Richard Lorenc

22 August 1982 28	Adelaide City	0–0	West Adelaide	Adelaide
		Report		Stadium: Olympic Sports Field; Attendance: 4,100; Referee: Jim Rossis

29 August 1982 29	APIA Leichhardt	4–1	Adelaide City	Sydney
	Pullen 5'; Giampaolo 65' (pen.); Soper 80', 85'	Report	L. Carter 68'	Stadium: Lambert Park; Attendance: 2,608; Referee: Peter Rampley

5 September 1982 30	Adelaide City	3–2	Heidelberg United	Adelaide
	J. Nyskohus 52' (pen.); Marocchi 84'; Villani 85'	Report	J. Nyskohus 1' (o.g.); MacLeod 2'	Stadium: Olympic Sports Field; Attendance: 1,982; Referee: Don Campbell

=== NSL Cup ===
Win Draw Loss

14 June 1982 First round	West Adelaide	3–1 (a.e.t.)	Adelaide City	Adelaide
	Heys 56'; Honeyman 95'; Atsalas 97'	Report	Marocchi 44'	Stadium: Hindmarsh Stadium; Attendance: 3,900

== Statistics ==
=== Appearances and goals ===
Includes all competitions. Players with no appearances not included in the list.

No.	Pos.	Nat.	Player	National Soccer League		NSL Cup		Total	
No.	Pos.	Nat.	Player	Apps	Goals	Apps	Goals	Apps	Goals
—	DF	(England)	Neil Banfield	23	0	1	0	24	0
—	FW	(England)	Les Carter	8	2	0	0	8	2
—	—	(Australia)	Mario Carusco	0+1	0	0	0	1	0
—	DF	(New Zealand)	Glen Dods	8+1	0	0	0	9	0
—	GK	(Scotland)	Bobby Ferguson	22	0	1	0	23	0
—	DF	(England)	Neville Flounders	27	1	1	0	28	1
—	—	(Australia)	Noel Flounders	1	0	0	0	1	0
—	DF	(Australia)	Chris Manou	13+4	2	1	0	18	2
—	MF	(Italy)	Sergio Marangoni	7+1	0	0	0	8	0
—	MF	(Australia)	Gary Marocchi	29	1	1	1	30	2
—	GK	(Northern Ireland)	Willie McNally	8	0	0	0	8	0
—	MF	(Australia)	Sergio Melta	29	5	1	0	30	5
—	DF	(Australia)	Chris Miller	1	0	0	0	1	0
—	FW	(Australia)	Dave Mitchell	3+1	3	0	0	4	3
—	MF	(Australia)	Brian Northcote	17	3	1	0	18	3
—	DF	(Australia)	Bugsy Nyskohus	29	1	1	0	30	1
—	FW	(Australia)	John Nyskohus	30	10	0	0	30	10
—	MF	(Australia)	John Perin	3	0	0	0	3	0
—	FW	(Australia)	Peter Rankin	11+5	0	1	0	17	0
—	DF	(Scotland)	Bobby Russell	30	2	1	0	31	2
—	DF	(Australia)	Paul Shillabeer	3+3	0	0	0	6	0
—	FW	(Australia)	Luciano Signore	3+3	0	0	0	6	0
—	MF	(Australia)	Charlie Villani	25+1	5	1	0	27	5

=== Disciplinary record ===
Includes all competitions. The list is sorted by squad number when total cards are equal. Players with no cards not included in the list.

Rank	No.	Pos.	Nat.	Player	National Soccer League			NSL Cup			Total		
Rank	No.	Pos.	Nat.	Player	Yellow card	Second yellow card	Red card	Yellow card	Second yellow card	Red card	Yellow card	Second yellow card	Red card
1	—	DF	(England)	Neil Banfield	1	0	1	0	0	0	1	0	1
1	—	FW	(Australia)	John Nyskohus	1	0	1	0	0	0	1	0	1
3	—	MF	(Italy)	Sergio Marangoni	0	0	1	0	0	0	0	0	1
4	—	MF	(Australia)	Brian Northcote	6	0	0	0	0	0	6	0	0
5	—	—	(Australia)	Chris Manou	4	0	0	0	0	0	4	0	0
5	—	MF	(Australia)	Sergio Melta	4	0	0	0	0	0	4	0	0
7	—	DF	(Australia)	Bugsy Nyskohus	3	0	0	0	0	0	3	0	0
8	—	DF	(England)	Neville Flounders	2	0	0	0	0	0	2	0	0
8	—	DF	(Scotland)	Bobby Russell	2	0	0	0	0	0	2	0	0
10	—	FW	(England)	Les Carter	1	0	0	0	0	0	1	0	0
Total					24	0	2	0	0	0	24	0	2

=== Clean sheets ===
Includes all competitions. The list is sorted by squad number when total clean sheets are equal. Numbers in parentheses represent games where both goalkeepers participated and both kept a clean sheet; the number in parentheses is awarded to the goalkeeper who was substituted on, whilst a full clean sheet is awarded to the goalkeeper who was on the field at the start of play. Goalkeepers with no clean sheets not included in the list.

Rank	No.	Nat.	Goalkeeper	NSL	NSL Cup	Total
1	—	(Scotland)	Bobby Ferguson	7	0	7
2	—	(Northern Ireland)	Willie McNally	2	0	2
Total				9	0	9
