= 2012–13 Arsenal F.C. season =

English football club season

Arsenal
2012–13 season
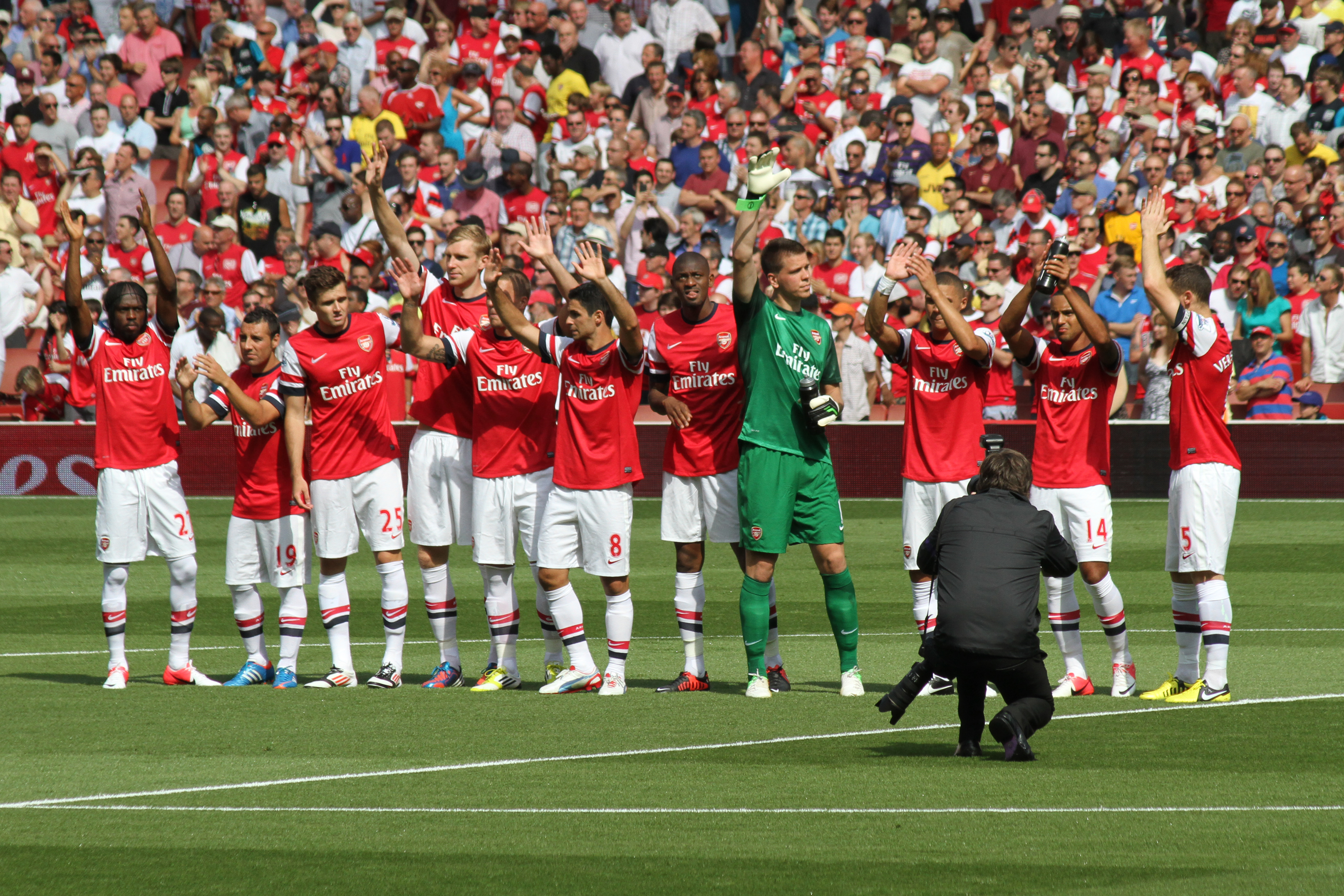
- Arsenal players lining up before the season-opening match against Sunderland in August 2012
- Chairman: Peter Hill-Wood
- Manager: Arsène Wenger
- Stadium: Emirates Stadium
- Premier League: 4th
- FA Cup: Fifth round
- League Cup: Quarter-finals
- UEFA Champions League: Round of 16
- Top goalscorer: League: Theo Walcott (14); All: Theo Walcott (21)
- Highest home attendance: 60,112 (vs. Manchester United, 28 April 2013, Premier League)
- Lowest home attendance: 58,351 (vs. Coventry City, 26 September 2012, League Cup)
- Average home league attendance: 60,079
Home colours	Away colours	Third colours

The 2012–13 season was Arsenal Football Club's 21st season in the Premier League and 87th consecutive season in the top flight of English football. Arsenal participated in the Premier League and the UEFA Champions League, after finishing third in the previous Premier League season. The League Cup however was out of their reach, and despite an entertaining cup run, which included 13 goals scored in two games, Arsenal lost to fourth-division Bradford City in the quarter-finals on penalties. In the FA Cup, Arsenal were knocked out by Championship side Blackburn Rovers in the fifth round. The Champions League also proved fruitless, as despite a valiant effort in Bavaria winning 2–0, they were ultimately knocked out on the away goals rule against Bayern Munich, thus extending their trophy drought for an eighth season. The highest scoring game in their season was the famous 7–5 win in the League Cup (after extra time), where they came back from 4 goals down to beat Reading. Arsenal's highest scoring league win was the 7–3 win against Newcastle United in December; this was also their joint highest-scoring Premier League game of all time. This season, Arsenal finished fourth after having to close another large points gap (like last season) between themselves and their North London rivals Tottenham Hotspur, who they beat 5–2 for the second season running.

== Review ==
=== Pre-season ===
Arsenal's pre-season transfers started as early as 30 April 2012, when Arsenal announced they were going to sign German international Lukas Podolski from 1. FC Köln for an undisclosed fee, thought to be around £10.9 million. Podolski officially joined Arsenal when the summer transfer window opened on 1 July. Podolski became the second German player to join the club in the space of a year, following the arrival of Per Mertesacker from Werder Bremen last summer, whom Podolski himself stated, played a big part in the transfer after talking about life at the Emirates. As well as early transfer news, Arsenal had early staff news, whereby, after 48 years of being associated with Arsenal, assistant manager Pat Rice retired at the end of the previous season. He was replaced on the same day by academy team manager, Steve Bould. Pat Rice played a big role at Arsenal, and was highly praised following his retirement by both the players and by manager Arsène Wenger.

Arsenal's pre-season schedule saw them take part in the second Markus Liebherr Memorial Cup (in memory of the former Southampton owner Markus Liebherr), hosted by Southampton in two 45-minute matches against what was originally Scottish club Rangers, but was later confirmed to be Anderlecht due to the financial troubles faced by Rangers, and the hosts themselves. The competition was held on 14 July 2012 as a round-robin system with Arsenal winning their first match 1–0 thanks to a close-range finish by Henri Lansbury, and despite losing 5–4 on penalties to Southampton (following a Gervinho 35th-minute equaliser to Jay Rodriguez's 31st-minute opener in regulation time), they had still accumulated enough points to win the cup.

Arsenal then travelled to the Far East, in a tour similar to that they embarked upon before their 2011–12 season. Arsenal started their tour by travelling to Malaysia to play a Malaysia League XI in Kuala Lumpur. After an open-training session (which was attended by 30,000 fans in the previous season), Arsenal scored two late goals from German youngster Thomas Eisfeld and fellow reserve team player Chuks Aneke following Azmi Muslim's opener to win the match 2–1. From there, they travelled to China to play fellow Premier League team Manchester City in Beijing in the inaugural China Cup. With extra significance due to the 2012 Summer Olympics, the match was held at the 2008 Olympic Stadium, and similar to the Malaysia tour, Arsenal attempted to get closer to their Chinese fans. Arsenal ultimately lost 0–2, with two goals in the last five minutes of the first half by Pablo Zabaleta and Yaya Touré to lose the China Cup.

Arsenal then travelled to Hong Kong to play Kitchee, champions of their national league. The game gave the club's huge fan base in Hong Kong the opportunity to see Arsenal play live in an entertaining encounter that ended 2–2 after 90 minutes after Eisfeld equalised late on (which should have led to a penalty shootout, but it was later scrapped). Arsenal played in Hong Kong for the first time in 17 years, addressing their growing commitment to Asia.

They were then going to travel to Nigeria to play the Nigeria national team in their first visit to Africa since visiting South Africa in 1993, however this was later postponed till summer 2013 based on concerns with the host city. Instead, the club sent three first-team players (Bacary Sagna, Mertesacker and new signing Podolski) on 28 July 2012 to engage with supporters in the region.

The last stop on Arsenal's pre-season schedule saw a repeat of last season's pre-season fixture against 1. FC Köln, resulting in an immediate goal-scoring return for new signing Lukas Podolski to his previous home ground. The fixture, which was scheduled six days before the start of the Premier League season, featured the likes of new signings Podolski, Olivier Giroud and Santi Cazorla in a commanding 4–0 win with an early opener from Thomas Vermaelen, a penalty and a close range strike from Podolski in the first half, and a finish from an acute angle from Gervinho in the second half to complete the rout. As the 2012 Olympics were being held in London, it was announced that Arsenal would not host the Emirates Cup tournament as part of their usual pre-season schedule, citing unnecessary increased pressure on London's infrastructure. However, Arsenal chief executive Ivan Gazidis stated that the Emirates Cup would be hosted by Arsenal in 2013, with a host of "top" clubs being lined up already.

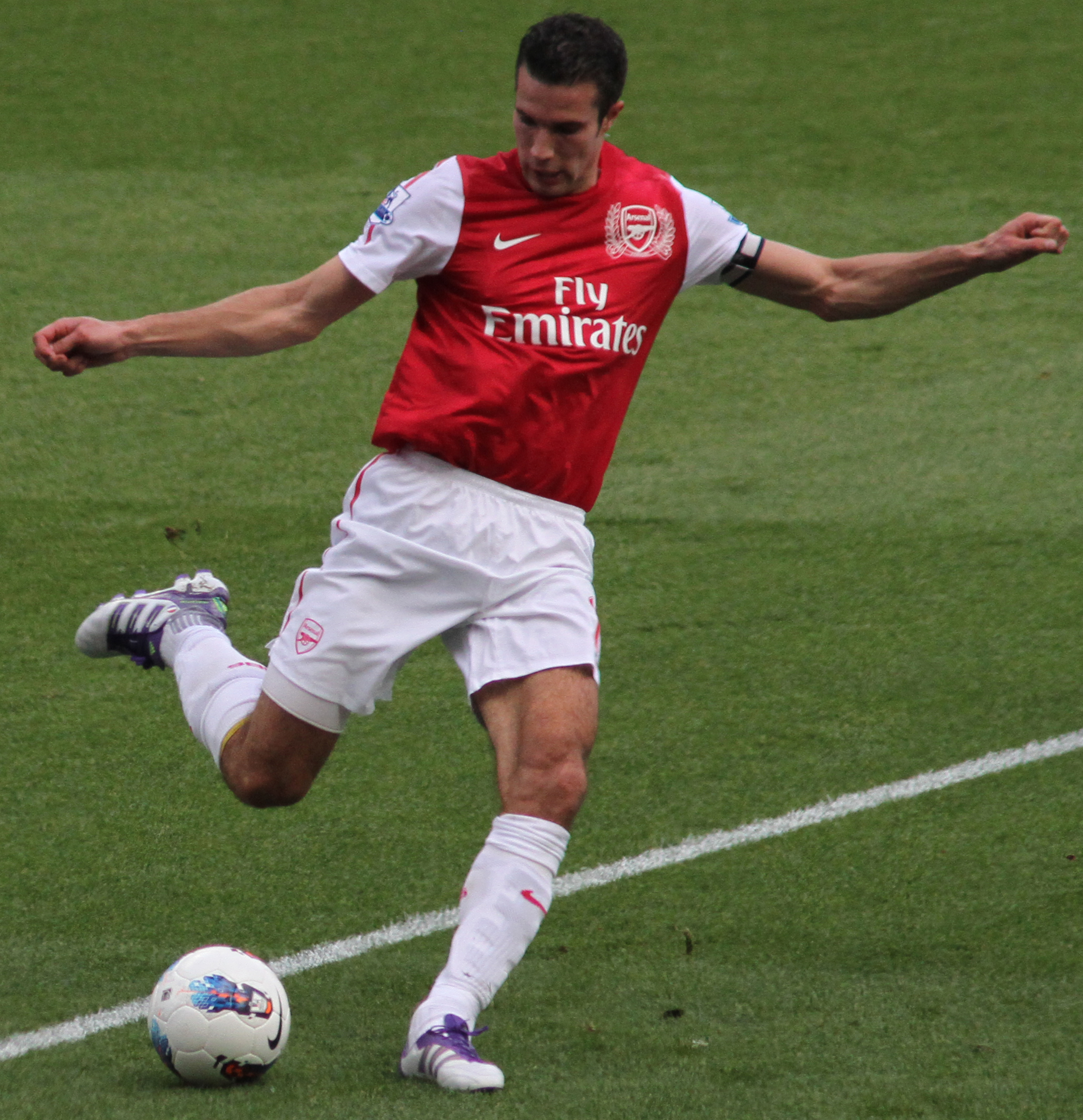
Robin van Persie (C), scored 96 Premier League goals in 8 seasons.

As the previous season drew to a close, Arsenal announced the release of seven players on 22 May 2012, five of whom played professionally for Arsenal, including Manuel Almunia, who made 175 first-team appearances for the club (including the 2006 UEFA Champions League Final), and Gavin Hoyte who was the only other released player to receive a first-team cap (against Manchester City on 22 November 2009).

Soon afterwards Arsenal announced their progress on the staffing situation at the Emirates, and despite Steve Bould already being announced as the new assistant manager, the Club officially announced that Bould had indeed been promoted, Neil Banfield would be promoted to being first-team coach, after managing the Arsenal reserve team for the past eight seasons, and that Terry Burton would become the reserve-team manager. On 8 June 2012, Arsenal continued their transfer activity with the sale of Oğuzhan Özyakup to Turkish club Beşiktaş. Although it is undisclosed by Arsenal, Beşiktaş confirmed that a four-year contract had been agreed with Özyakup and a fee of around £405,000 agreed with Arsenal for the 19-year-old midfielder. Arsenal then announced their second "big" transfer of the summer transfer window, with the signing of French striker Olivier Giroud from Montpellier for a reported fee of £12.8 million. Giroud was top scorer in the French league last season and Arsène Wenger stated that he expects him to flourish. He was primarily signed as a backup (rather than a replacement) to golden boot winner Robin van Persie, in a bid to challenge this season's Premier League title and win the club's first trophy for seven years.

On 4 July 2012, however, a transfer saga, similar to the ones of Cesc Fàbregas and Samir Nasri last summer, took a big step as club captain and player-of-the-season Van Persie revealed that he would not renew his Arsenal contract, and would therefore become a free agent at the end of the current season, signalling the end of an eight-year career at the club following his move from Feyenoord in 2004. This eventually led to the confession that Giroud had actually been signed as a replacement for the Dutch talisman. Meanwhile, on 29 June, Arsenal announced that a further seven academy players had signed professional contracts.

To signal the intent of reducing surplus players, Arsenal then announced that a £6 million agreement had been reached for the sale of Carlos Vela on 17 July 2012. Vela featured 62 times for Arsenal, scoring 11 goals, and he was the first member of the first-team squad to be sold in the summer transfer window. A week later Arsenal announced that defender Laurent Koscielny had signed a new long-term contract after a series of consistent appearances in the first-team last season. Throughout the summer transfer window, manager Arsène Wenger had promised the club's fans that a headline transfer would be made, so to compete for the title, and this materialised on 7 August, when Spanish midfielder Santi Cazorla signed on a four-year contract for a reported transfer fee of £16.5 million, making him the most expensive player in the history of the club. With the sale of Van Persie being confirmed by the club for a fee thought to be around £24 million, on 17 August Arsenal revealed that Thomas Vermaelen had taken over the captaincy from the Dutchman, with Mikel Arteta being given the position of vice-captain.

=== August ===
The Premier League fixture list was announced on 18 June 2012 and it gave Arsenal a home game against Sunderland to open the new season. Both matches last season produced a 2–1 win in Arsenal's favour, which promised an entertaining opening match for the club. Although Arsenal had the better of the chances, they played out a 0–0 draw with the north-eastern club. Shortly after, Arsenal announced that an agreement had been reached with Barcelona for the sale of Alex Song, and two days later, on 20 August 2012, Arsenal announced that he had indeed been sold. Meanwhile, in contrast to last season, Arsenal did not have any other commitments in August apart from competing in the Premier League, with no English contingent participating in the play-off round of the Champions League. This therefore allowed Arsenal ample time to prepare for their next test at the Britannia Stadium in their second game against Stoke City, however it ended as a second successive 0–0 draw, and although their previous defensive frailties were not present throughout August, a goalless month was a cause for concern. Arsenal had no disciplinary issues in their opening two games, which epitomised the controlled, albeit unexciting, start to the season.

On a transfer deadline day that was dominated by the club's Premier League rivals, Arsenal only announced departures, as first team players Nicklas Bendtner and Park Chu-young departed on season-long loans, to Italian giants Juventus and La Liga club Celta de Vigo respectively. Despite manager Arsène Wenger stating that he is open to transfers before the window closes, Arsenal did not shadow the events of last season, in buying no players in the final week of the transfer window.

=== September ===
Arsenal began a series a tough matches against Liverpool at Anfield, where the Gunners registered both their first goals and cards of the season. New signings Lukas Podolski and Santi Cazorla paired up for both goals, as Podolski finished low to the goalkeeper's left in the 31st minute, and Cazorla smashed a near post shot past goalkeeper Pepe Reina in the 68th minute to give Arsenal a commanding 2–0 win over Liverpool. Arsenal continued their unbeaten start with an emphatic victory over Southampton that rested fears over the Gunner's lack of scoring potential. A brace from Gervinho, goals from Podolski and Theo Walcott, and two own goals capped an almost perfect display, with the only error coming from goalkeeper Wojciech Szczęsny, as his spill gifted the visitors a goal, and dealt Arsenal their first defensive blip of the season, in a 6–1 thrashing.

Away from the Premier League, Arsenal started their Champions League campaign with a group stage match against debutants Montpellier at the Stade de la Mosson. Dubbed as favourites, Arsenal did not begin the match in such commanding fashion, as a penalty, conceded by Thomas Vermaelen, was put away by Younès Belhanda in the ninth minute, but two goals in quick succession from Podolski and Gervinho meant Arsenal turned the game around to come out as 2–1 winners, a scoreline that reflected the quality of the two teams. Arsenal's tough month continued, with arguable the toughest test that awaited them in the entire season – an away tie at champions Manchester City. Despite the constant troubles that have come from zonal marking, Arsenal used this technique from set-pieces all throughout the game, which ultimately led to Joleon Lescott's 40th-minute header giving City the lead until Laurent Koscielny's 82nd-minute equaliser, giving Arsenal a deserved draw at the Etihad. The draw extended Arsenal's unbeaten run to five games and earned the team plaudits around the footballing world.

Continuing with the packed fixture list, came another midweek tie against Coventry City in the League Cup. Arsenal fielded a team mixed with experience and young talent in a convincing 6–1 win over the League One outfit. Olivier Giroud opened his account for the club, with a clever finish over goalkeeper Murphy, and goals from youngsters Alex Oxlade-Chamberlain and Ignasi Miquel, a brace from Walcott, and an instinctive finish by Andrey Arshavin capped a satisfying night for the Arsenal faithful. Arsenal's final game of September came in the form of a visit from table-topping Chelsea side to the Emirates Stadium. Despite Gervinho's strike late in the first half, goals from Fernando Torres and Juan Mata, both from set plays, on either side of the half way mark, highlighted the club's underlying defensive frailties, in an unconvincing display from the Gunners.

=== October ===
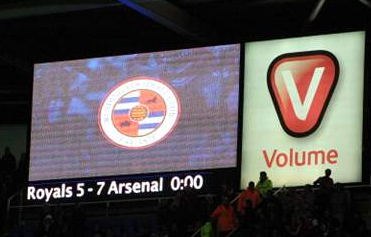
The Madjeski Stadium scoreboard dictating the historic Arsenal win over Reading in the League Cup on 30 October 2012

Arsenal began October with a 3–1 Premier League win against West Ham United at the Boleyn Ground. After conceding an early goal from Mohamed Diamé, Arsenal netted late twice, including Olivier Giroud's first Premier League goal. Following an international break, Arsenal travelled to Carrow Road to face third-bottom Norwich City, and lost 1–0 through a 20-minute Grant Holt goal after a Vito Mannone spill, in an unconvincing display from the Gunners. Their poor form continued in a Champions League clash with Schalke 04, conceding twice in a 2–0 loss (their first at the Emirates in a European group stage match), putting Arsenal second in Group B with three games to play.

Arsenal then produced a respectable performance in their next match against a struggling Queens Park Rangers in the Premier League, thanks to another late goal, this time from Mikel Arteta, following Stéphane Mbia's red card dismissal. Their final game of October was an away League Cup fourth-round tie against Reading, where after having fallen to a four-goal deficit after 37 minutes, goals from Theo Walcott (twice), Olivier Giroud and Laurent Koscielny managed to equalise the match to 4–4 after 90 minutes (despite a controversial 90+6th-minute equaliser, when only four minutes of added time was indicated). Theo Walcott and Marouane Chamakh (twice) then netted in extra time, with Pavel Pogrebnyak scoring an additional goal for Reading, completing one of football's most inspiring comebacks, as well as one of the most remarkable matches in League Cup history (as well as the highest scoring), to a final score of 7–5 to Arsenal, who have never lost to a Reading side in all ten occasions that the teams have met. Arsenal became the first side to have scored over six goals in two consecutive League Cup matches in this record breaking and inspiring display. They were drawn against League Two Bradford City in the quarter-finals and entered November on a high.

=== November ===
Arsenal's November started as poorly as September had ended and October had started, and despite a tough test against Manchester United, an unlikely three points for the Gunners did not materialise in a lacklustre performance that only brought about two shots on target, including a late consolation by Santi Cazorla, and a disappointing 2–1 loss at Old Trafford. Arsenal extended their losing streak at Old Trafford to six seasons, in a performance that left Arsenal sixth in the Premier League table, nine points off the top. Arsenal, frustratingly for everyone connected with the club, showed another stuttering performance against table-topping Schalke 04 in the Champions League. They created a 2–0 lead inside 26 minutes with goals against the run of play, from Theo Walcott (following a mix-up in defence) and Giroud, however, Schalke deservedly pegged Arsenal back with goals either side of half time, from Dutch striker Klaas-Jan Huntelaar and Peruvian Jefferson Farfán, as the Gunners left Gelsenkirchen with a point. The result, which Walcott said Arsenal would have taken before the game, left Arsenal a point and a place behind Schalke, in a widely open group.

Four days later, Arsenal surrendered another two-goal lead, this time created by Lukas Podolski and Giroud, into a 3–2 deficit following a brace (including a penalty conceded by Arteta) for Dimitar Berbatov and a header from Alexander Kačaniklić for Fulham. Giroud scored in the 69th minute to level the game at 3–3, thus making the game the first time he scored in consecutive games, and two goals in one single game, but the Gunners were denied late on after Mark Schwarzer saved a penalty from Arteta which would have given Arsenal a 4–3 lead in the 90+5th minute. The draw meant Arsenal had won only one of the previous six Premier League and Champions League games (L,L,W,L,D,D), which piled more pressure on Arsène Wenger. With an uncanny resemblance to last season, Arsenal entered their first North London derby against Tottenham Hotspur on the back of a poor run of results, while still managing coming out as 5–2 winners against their bitter rivals, who were once again down to ten men. Inside the first 20 minutes, former Gunner Emmanuel Adebayor went from "hero to zero" as he gave Spurs an early lead before getting sent off nine minutes later. This allowed the Gunners a route back into the game, which eventually came from the unlikely source of Per Mertesacker with his first goal for the club inside 25 minutes. Arsenal then finished the half strongly with goals from Podolski and Giroud to give them a 3–1 lead. In the second half, Arsenal soaked up some early pressure from Spurs before Cazorla scored when the team were on a magnificent break. Despite Gareth Bale's goal in the 71st minute, Arsenal made their man-advantage count, as Walcott completed the rout three minutes from the end.

In Arsenal's fifth game of the month, they faced a Montpellier side in poor form, and in a far less entertaining game than the last, Arsenal came out as solid 2–0 winners, with a clean sheet. Two sublime finishes from Jack Wilshere, his first in 725 days, and Podolski, a left-foot volley reminiscent of former captain Van Persie, allowed Arsenal to secure qualification to the knockout stage of the competition, with only the top two places to be settled on the last matchday between the Gunners and Schalke.

Arsenal returned to poor form in their next match however, as they played out a dull 0–0 draw with relegation-threatened Aston Villa, meaning the Gunners lost ground yet again on the top four sides. Yet again, Arsenal played out an uninspiring draw against fellow Champions League-chasers Everton. The game started well for the Gunners, as Walcott scored inside 52 seconds at Goodison Park, but Marouane Fellaini equalised just before the half-hour mark to level the score at 1–1, and so it stayed until the end, as Arsenal finished November in seventh place in the Premier League table.

=== December ===
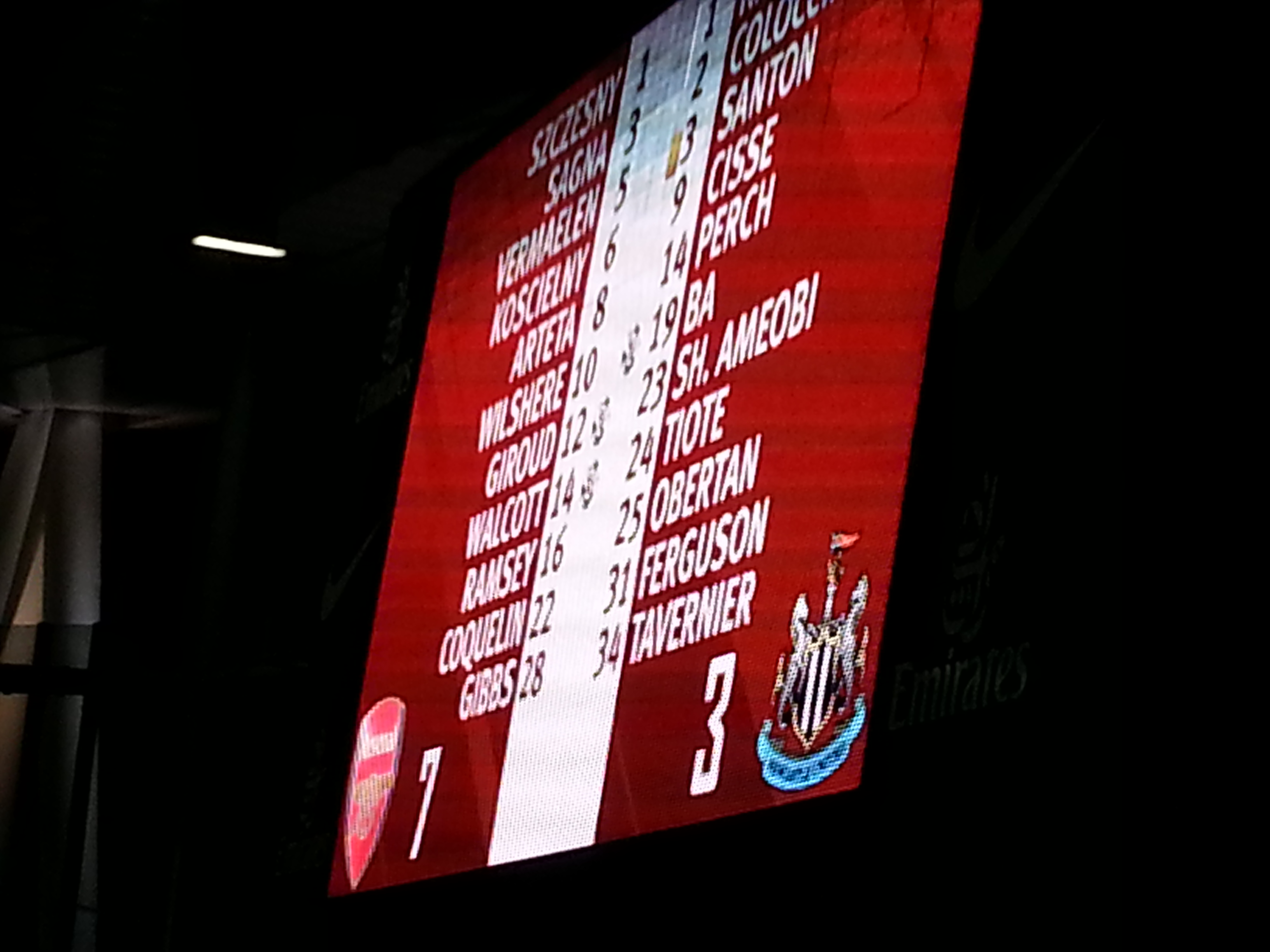
The Emirates Stadium scoreboard after the 7–3 victory over Newcastle United on 29 December 2012

Arsenal started December losing 0–2 to a Swansea City side under Michael Laudrup, with two goals scored by Michu for Swansea late on, in what the BBC called "Arsenal's worst start to a season under Arsene Wenger". Next up was a Champions League visit to Olympiacos. Consecutive losses were on the cards for Arsenal, as they named a weakened 18-man squad ahead of vital Premier League games for the club. Despite taking a 38th-minute lead with a low drive from Tomáš Rosický, Arsenal surrendered yet another lead with two goals in under 10 minutes from Ioannis Maniatis and Konstantinos Mitroglou to give Olympiacos a 2–1 win. Had Arsenal won the game, they would have gone top of the table, as Montpellier managed a draw against Schalke 04, but instead they finished second, setting up a tough test against Bayern Munich in the last-16.

Arsenal's fortunes turned however, in their next match against high-flying West Bromwich Albion, where a controversial penalty for a perceived dive from Cazorla gifted Arsenal the lead, when it was put down the centre of the goal by Arteta on 26 minutes. Arsenal then doubled their lead, this time on a blatant foul on Oxlade-Chamberlain, with another penalty from Arteta to finish the game 2–0 in Arsenal's favour. It was the Gunners first win in four Premier League games, and it lifted the team up to seventh in the table. Spirits dropped yet again, however, as a near full-strength Arsenal squad humiliatingly crashed out to League Two side Bradford City in the League Cup, 3–2 on penalties, following an 88th-minute equaliser by Thomas Vermaelen, who incidentally missed the final penalty. This left Arsenal with interests in three competitions.

Arsenal then entered the Christmas period with a Monday night fixture against then-bottom Reading. The match ended in a familiar scoreline that lifted the Arsenal fans; 5–2. Cazorla scored his first hat-trick for the club, and also provided an assist for Walcott's goal, and the fifth of the match; Lukas Podolski opened the scoring inside 15 minutes. Arsenal continued their revival with a solid victory over Wigan Athletic with the Gunners recording three consecutive wins for the first time since March last season. An Arteta penalty in the 60th minute gave Arsenal a 1–0 win and raised the team to fourth in the table. Arsenal have a larger break than other teams in the Premier League however, as the West Ham game was postponed due to a tube strike in the London Underground. Arsenal returned to action in style on 29 December against Newcastle by emphatically beating the Tyneside team 7–3. Arsenal were never behind in the game, but were pegged-back three times by two goals from Demba Ba and one from Sylvain Marveaux following goals from Podolski, Oxlade-Chamberlain and Walcott. However, following another two goals from Walcott (to complete his hat-trick), and a brace from substitute Giroud, Arsenal rounded off an impressive display to give confidence to the fans ahead of the crucial month January.

=== January ===
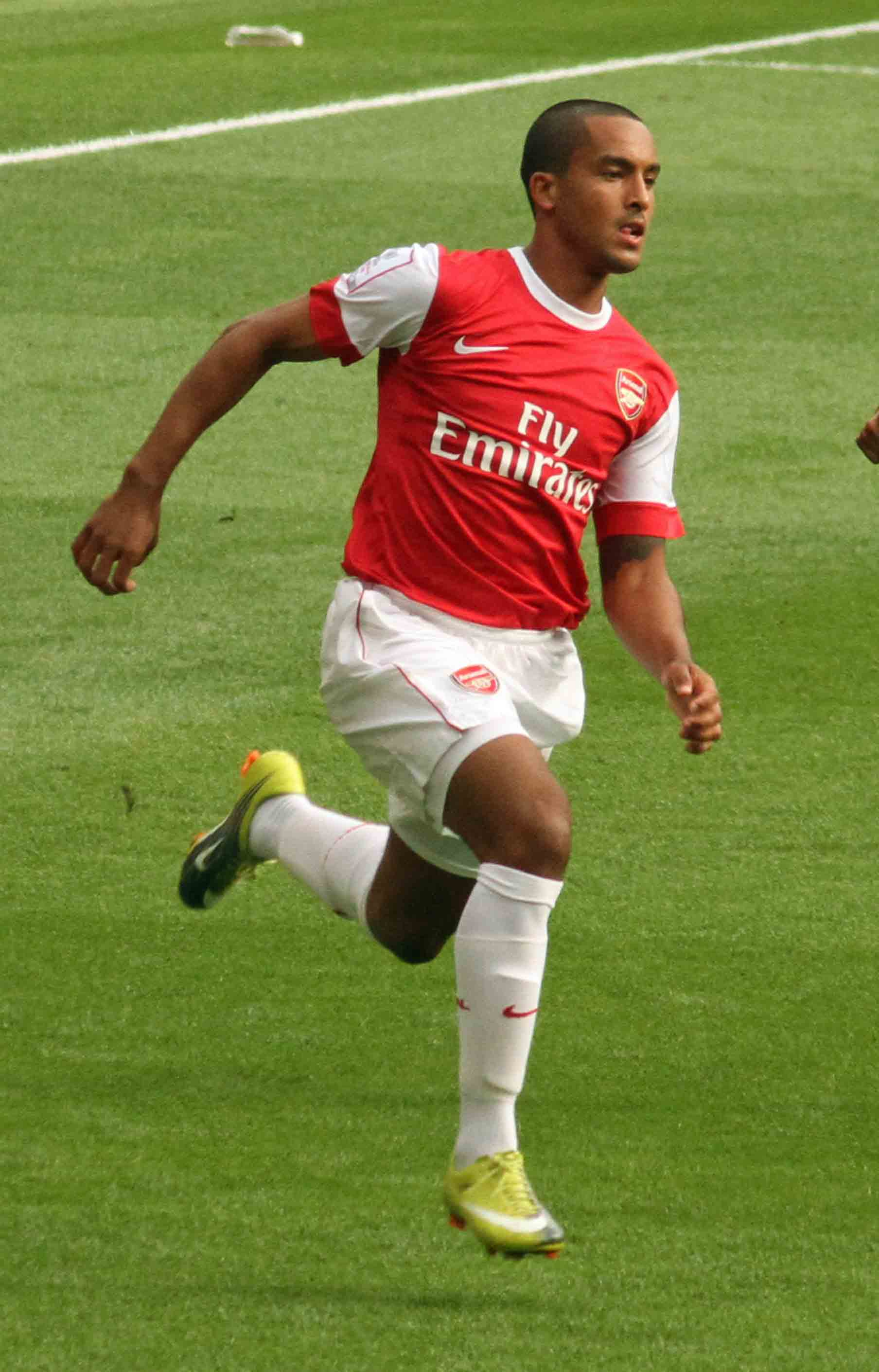
Theo Walcott was top scorer of the season at the time he signed his contract

Arsenal started 2013 in disappointing fashion with a result that Wenger called "undeserved": a 1–1 draw against Southampton. Arsenal were gifted their goal with an own goal from Guly do Prado (Arsenal's third of the season, with the previous two also coming against Southampton), after Gastón Ramírez opened the scoring for the Saints. The result was the last of a four-game winning streak ahead of a tough couple of matches against Premier League champions Manchester City, and European champions Chelsea. Arsenal completed their first transfer business of the January transfer window, with the loan of Moroccan striker Marouane Chamakh to West Ham on 4 January 2013. Another loan was announced a day later as Swiss centre-back Johan Djourou joined Hannover 96. Both players had yet to feature in the Premier League this season for the Gunners, and both deals were for the rest of the season. Arsenal started their FA Cup run against Swansea in the third round, and following an uneventful first half, the second half sprung into life as both teams scored late on (Podolski and Gibbs for the Gunners, and Danny Graham for Swansea) after Michu opened the scoring in the 58th minute. The final score of 2–2 meant both teams would play a replay.

A week later, Arsenal slumped to a controversial yet disappointing loss to the champions Manchester City as Koscielny was sent off in the ninth minute after fouling Edin Džeko in the penalty area. Despite missing the resulting penalty, Džeko and James Milner gave City a comfortable 2–0 victory. Vincent Kompany was sent off late in the game leaving both teams with ten players. The stadium rang out in a chorus of jeering at the final whistle, aimed at both the Gunners and the referee. Arsenal turned their fortunes, however, as they progressed 1–0 winners against Swansea City into the FA Cup fourth round. Jack Wilshere buried a shot from outside the penalty area to keep Arsenal's trophy hopes alive. Arsenal fans soon had further encouragement as striker Theo Walcott signed a new contract with the club, for an undisclosed length of time. Arsène Wenger said he was "delighted" to secure the contract of a "strong player and also a great person".

Soon after, Arsenal suffered a second consecutive Premier League loss against Chelsea at Stamford Bridge. Another poor start resulted in two goals conceded, which was a similar situation to their previous league defeat. Despite Walcott managing to pull one goal back in the second half, the game eventually ended 2–1, leaving Arsenal's hope of finishing in the top four in serious doubt. Some doubt was erased only three days later, as four goals in ten early second-half minutes meant Arsenal romped to a 5–1 victory over West Ham in the rescheduled match, originally to have been played on Boxing Day. Two goals from Giroud, and one each from Walcott, Podolski and Cazorla left the Gunners just four points off their north London rivals Tottenham in fourth. Arsenal then progressed into the fifth round of the FA Cup in another thriller three days later, with a 3–2 victory over Brighton & Hove Albion in the Falmer Stadium. Giroud scored yet another brace, and Walcott scored once to increase his goal tally to 17 for the season, as Arsenal set up a tie against Championship side Blackburn Rovers in the next round.

Back in the Premier League, Arsenal continued their increasingly frustrating habit of starting games slowly, going 2–0 behind against Liverpool inside an hour thanks to goals from Luis Suárez and Jordan Henderson. However, two goals in quick succession from in-form strikers Giroud and Walcott battled Arsenal back to a 2–2 draw. Giroud spurned a late chance to collect a hat-trick of braces and win the game for the Gunners. Following an injury picked up by Kieran Gibbs in that game, Arsenal rushed to complete a late signing of Spanish international left-back Nacho Monreal from Málaga on deadline day, for an undisclosed contract length and fee (thought to be around £8.5 million), though disappointed Gunners fans by not making a move for linked Barcelona striker David Villa.

=== February ===
Arsenal started February solidly, with a commanding yet disciplined performance against Stoke. A deflected free kick from Lukas Podolski late in the game and a brilliant display from debutant Monreal left the Gunners in a promising position as teams around them dropped points. For the first time in six attempts, Arsenal climbed the table to fifth with a 1–0 win over Sunderland. Arsenal had plenty of chances throughout the first half and parts of the second, and Sunderland had the chance to equalise in the second-half, but it was Cazorla's ninth goal of the season that was the difference of the two teams. Shortly thereafter, Arsenal announced the loan departure of left-back André Santos to Brazilian club Grêmio until the end of the season. This came after the signing of Spanish international Monreal pushed Santos further down the pecking order. With an upcoming fixture in the Champions League, it was believed that Vermaelen or Gibbs would have to return to play left-back.

Despite the strong start to the month, Arsenal crashed out of the FA Cup with a disappointing 1–0 loss to Championship club Blackburn Rovers. Although their opponents only had three shots on target, Arsenal rued not putting their chances away throughout the game, and left themselves with little hope of ending their trophy drought this season. Three days later, Arsenal resumed their Champions League campaign with a Round of 16 clash against Bayern Munich. In the first leg of a very challenging tie at the Emirates, they slumped to a 3–1 first-leg defeat, with Podolski scoring against his old club to give Arsenal a slight chance (albeit needing three goals at the Allianz Arena) in the second leg. Toni Kroos, Thomas Müller and Mario Mandžukić scored for Bayern. Needing to lift the fans, Arsenal played relegation-threatened Aston Villa in sight of a third-straight win in the Premier League. Arsenal did so with a brace from Santi Cazorla either side of an Andreas Weimann equaliser to stay four points adrift of North-London rivals Tottenham, who they played the following Sunday.

=== March ===
However, the North London derby ended in bitter disappointment for the "red side of North London" as Tottenham ran out 2–1 following two goals in quick succession from Gareth Bale and Aaron Lennon late in the first-half, one of which being eventually cancelled out by Mertesacker's second goal for the club (both were against Tottenham this season). Arsenal then had a 10-day wait before their return leg in the Champions League, due to Everton's participation in the FA Cup. Though many resigned the Gunners to defeat, Arsenal had a valiant attempt to knock out their German opponents by winning 2–0 on the night (with a goal inside the first three minutes from Giroud and a goal in the last three minutes of the game from Laurent Koscielny), crashing out on away goals. However, they were the first team to defeat Bayern Munich at the Allianz Arena this season and the first team not to concede against Bayern all season, giving huge confidence to the team both defensively and offensively in the final ten "cup-finals" of the Premier League season. Arsenal stepped up once again to Wenger's rallying calls, as Arsenal recorded a second consecutive 2–0 victory in a tough encounter at the Liberty Stadium against Swansea. Goals in the second half from Nacho Monreal – his first for the club – and Gervinho kept Arsenal's top-four hopes alive. Arsenal's next match was after the international break, against a struggling Reading side who Arsenal had already scored 12 goals in two matches against this season (in all competitions). Arsenal made it 12 wins in all 12 games against Reading as goals from Gervinho, Cazorla, Giroud and Arteta ensured the Gunners ran out 4–1 winners (with Hal Robson-Kanu pulling one back for the Royals) and kept up their chase for the top four.

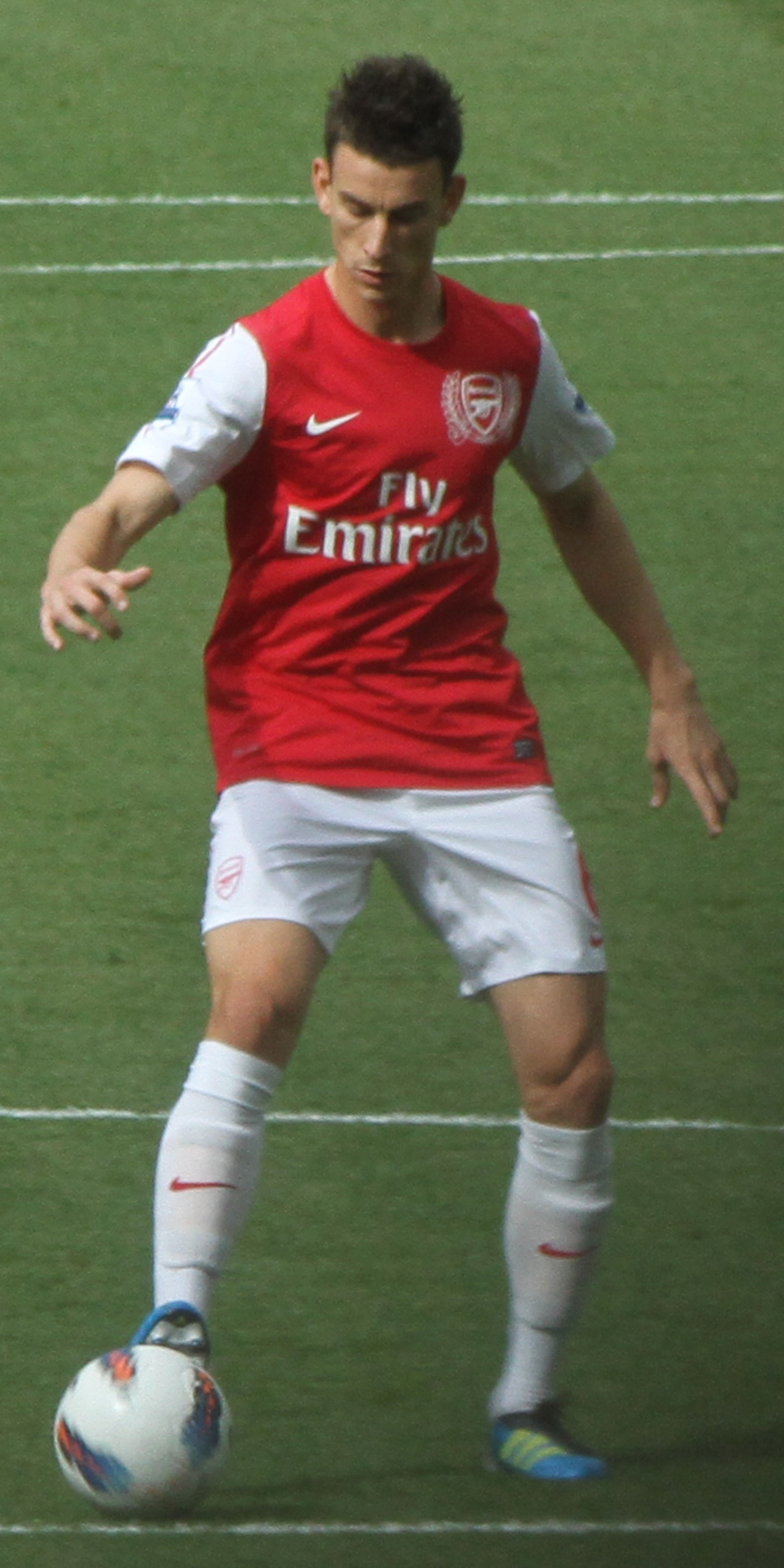
Laurent Koscielny again scored the crucial goal in Arsenal's final match of the season, similar to last season, that secured Arsenal's top four spot

=== April ===
Along with news that Jack Wilshere and Theo Walcott were to return from injury soon, Arsenal fans were given more to cheer about as a spirited performance following Metersacker's sending off against West Brom lifted the Gunners temporarily up to fourth in the table. Two goals from Tomáš Rosický put Arsenal in a commanding position but a penalty scored by James Morrison on 71 minutes made for a nervy end as Arsenal eventually ran out 2–1 winners at The Hawthorns. Arsenal then started a period of three games in a week against Norwich, as a spirited comeback in the last seven minutes of the match ensured Arsenal went third in the Premier League table. Michael Turner opened the scoring for Norwich from a set piece but a trio of goals (including a controversial penalty) was scored by Arteta, Giroud and Podolski, as the Gunners ran out 3–1 winners.

Their next match was against fellow Champions League-chasers Everton, and after early Everton pressure Arsenal settled into the match, but was ultimately unable to score for the first time in 12 games, in a match that ended 0–0. The Gunners resumed their top four fight in a derby against Fulham that saw two men sent off (Steve Sidwell for Fulham and Giroud for Arsenal, who later lost his appeal for it to be rescinded) and an unlikely scorer in Per Mertesacker, as Arsenal won 1–0. Following a guard of honour to the newly crowned champions, Arsenal faced a Manchester United side with former captain Robin van Persie in tow. Theo Walcott scored early as Arsenal showed early signs of brilliance, but the goal was later cancelled out by a penalty, conceded by Sagna, from Van Persie. The match ended 1–1.

=== May ===
Arsenal entered a crucial period of the season with a game against newly relegated Queens Park Rangers, as Tottenham and Chelsea would play their game in hand against each other, leaving a straight battle to the top four Champions League qualification spots. Walcott again got the Gunners off to the perfect start with the fastest goal in the Premier League season so far, as well as the 12th fastest goal in Premier League history, after he put the Gunners ahead after 20 seconds. The game petered out, however, but it increased Arsenal's unbeaten run to 8 games, as the Gunners ran out 1–0 winners. Arsenal had a ten-day before their final home game of the season against newly crowned FA Cup winners Wigan in what proved to be a crucial game at both ends of the Premier League table. The game was won 4–1 by the Gunners, after goals from Podolski (2), Walcott and Aaron Ramsey cancelled out Shaun Maloney's free-kick strike. Wigan were subsequently relegated after an eight-year stay in the Premier League, whilst Arsenal left their top four faith in their own hands by staying one point above rivals Tottenham. Although the result also presented an opportunity for an unprecedented "third place play-off", this was not needed following a Chelsea win over Everton, however Arsenal secured fourth spot as a 1–0 win over Newcastle (scored by Laurent Koscielny) meant Arsenal finished the season on 73 points, three more than the previous season and one more above rivals Tottenham. Arsenal thus qualified for the 2013–14 UEFA Champions League.

Following the season's completion, Arsenal revealed their top four players of the season as voted for by Arsenal Football Club members. In fourth place came the Spaniard Mikel Arteta for his consistent performances in the middle of midfield (which included recording the second highest number of passes in the campaign: 2750 at a 92% success rate) with 5% of the votes. In third came Arsenal's top scorer Theo Walcott, whose tally of 21 goals in all competitions bettered that of any of his previous seasons at the club. He also held the feat of most assists of the campaign in an Arsenal shirt, as he deservedly claimed 12.7% of the votes. In second place came Laurent Koscielny after taking over from captain Thomas Vermaelen as a main-stay in the heart of Arsenal's defence. A number of assured performances that included conceded only 5 goals in the final 10 games of the season handed the French defender 13.5% of all the votes. Lastly, Arsenal's Player of Season award went to Spaniard Santi Cazorla, who Arsène Wenger described as "the perfect footballer". With 12 goals and 14 assists, Cazorla announced his arrival in English football with a bang, as he ran away with 55.7% of the votes in the club poll.

=== Brief Season round-up ===
Although Arsenal failed to end their trophy drought, the Gunners had a successful Premier League campaign. At the season's end, Arsène Wenger promised fans the club would make big signings and spend highly to get world-class players to help them challenge for trophies in the following seasons.

== Key events ==
- 30 April: German striker Lukas Podolski joins Arsenal for an undisclosed fee, thought be around £10.9 million, from German club 1. FC Köln
- 22 May: The Club announces that they will be releasing five professional players − Manuel Almunia, George Brislen-Hall, Gavin Hoyte, Sean McDermott and Rhys Murphy, and two scholars − James Campbell and Jeffrey Monakana − at the end of their contracts on 30 June.
- 24 May: Following Pat Rice's retirement, Steve Bould and Neil Banfield become the assistant manager and first-team coach respectively. Boro Primorac remains a first-team coach alongside Banfield.
- 26 June: French striker Olivier Giroud joins Arsenal for an undisclosed fee, thought to be around £12.8 million, from French club Montpellier
- 5 July: Arsenal announce that Terry Burton will complete the coaching staff list by becoming the reserve-team manager, following the promotion of Neil Banfield.
- 17 July: Arsenal announce that Mexican striker Carlos Vela will join Spanish club Real Sociedad on a four-year contract worth £6 million.
- 24 July: French defender Laurent Koscielny signs a new long-term contract.
- 7 August: Spanish midfielder Santi Cazorla joins Arsenal for an undisclosed fee, thought to be around £11.4 million, from financially troubled Spanish club Málaga
- 16 August: Jack Wilshere is given the squad number 10, previously allocated to Robin van Persie
- 17 August: Following the departure of Robin van Persie for a reported fee of £24 million to Manchester United, Thomas Vermaelen was promoted to club captain and Mikel Arteta was given the vice-captaincy.
- 18 August: Arsenal begin the 2012–13 Premier League season with a goalless draw at home to Sunderland.
- 20 August: Arsenal announce the sale of Cameroonian midfielder Alex Song to Barcelona with the latter confirming that he had signed a five-year contract for a transfer fee of £14.9 million.
- 31 August: Arsenal announce the departures of Nicklas Bendtner and Park Chu-young on season-long loans to Juventus and Celta de Vigo respectively.
- 30 October: Arsenal recorded victory in the League Cup to a record-breaking 7–5 scoreline at the Madjeski Stadium, having been 4–0 down initially. The game had the most goals ever scored in a single League Cup match (12).
- 19 November: Midfielder Emmanuel Frimpong joins Championship side Charlton Athletic on loan until 1 January 2013
- 11 December: Arsenal crashed out of the League Cup after losing 3–2 on penalties to League Two side Bradford City; the first time in the club's history that a lower-league club knocked out the Gunners in the competition.
- 19 December: British players Kieran Gibbs, Carl Jenkinson, Alex Oxlade-Chamberlain, Aaron Ramsey and Jack Wilshere extend their contracts, and pledge their futures for four to six years.
- 29 December: Arsenal participate in the joint highest scoring game in the Premier League – a 7–3 win over Newcastle.
- 4 January: Moroccan striker Marouane Chamakh joins West Ham United on loan until the end of the season.
- 5 January: Swiss defender Johan Djourou joins Hannover 96 on loan until the end of the season.
- 18 January: England international striker Theo Walcott signs new long-term contract for an undisclosed length, ending speculation of his departure.
- 25 January: Midfielder Emmanuel Frimpong joins fellow Premier League side Fulham on loan until the end of the season.
- 31 January: Spanish left back Nacho Monreal joins Arsenal for an undisclosed fee, thought to be around £8.5 million, from Spanish club Málaga
- 11 February: After falling down the pecking order, left-back André Santos departs the club on loan until the end of the season, to join Brazilian club Grêmio.
- 16 February: Arsenal are eliminated from the FA Cup in the fifth-round following a 1–0 home loss to Championship side Blackburn Rovers.
- 13 March: Arsenal's UEFA Champions League campaign came to a valiant end after a 2–0 win in Bavaria meant Arsenal lost out on the away goals rule (following a 3–1 first leg loss). It resigned the Gunners to an eight successive trophy-less season.
- 28 March: Arsenal announce that French midfielder Abou Diaby tore his anterior cruciate ligament in training and will subsequently face up to 9 months out as a result.
- 23 April: The FA announce that Arsenal's appeal against Olivier Giroud's red card against Fulham (20 March) is rejected, thus condemning the striker to the usual three-match ban
- 19 May: Arsenal finish the season in the top 4 resigning their North London rivals Tottenham Hotspur to Europa League football next season.
- 31 May: Arsenal announced, via a club member's poll, that the Player of the Season was Spaniard Santi Cazorla for his performances in both the midfield and front three. He was followed by defender Laurent Koscielny in second, top scorer Theo Walcott in third and fellow Spaniard Mikel Arteta in fourth.

== Players ==
=== Squad information ===
N	Pos.	Nat.	Name	Age	EU	Since	App	Goals	Ends	Transfer fee	Notes
1	GK	(Poland)	Wojciech Szczęsny	23	EU	2006	106	0	2015	Youth system	
2	MF	(France)	Abou Diaby	27	EU	2006 (Winter)	178	19	undisclosed	£2.0M	
3	DF	(France)	Bacary Sagna	30	EU	2007	236	4	2014	£7.5M	
4	DF	(Germany)	Per Mertesacker	28	EU	2011	71	3	2015	£8.0M	
5	DF	(Belgium)	Thomas Vermaelen (captain)	27	EU	2009	129	15	2015	£10.0M	
6	DF	(France)	Laurent Koscielny	27	EU	2010	119	10	undisclosed	£8.5M	
7	MF	(Czech Republic)	Tomáš Rosický	32	EU	2006	182	22	2014	£6.8M	
8	MF	(Spain)	Mikel Arteta (vice-captain)	31	EU	2011	81	12	2015	£10.0M	
9	FW	(Germany)	Lukas Podolski	27	EU	2012	42	16	2016	£10.9M	
10	MF	(England)	Jack Wilshere	21	EU	2008	97	5	2018	Youth system	
11	DF	(Brazil)	André Santos	30	Non-EU	2011	33	3	undisclosed	£6.2M	On loan to Grêmio
12	FW	(France)	Olivier Giroud	26	EU	2012	47	17	undisclosed	£12.8M	
14	FW	(England)	Theo Walcott	24	EU	2006 (Winter)	263	63	undisclosed	£9.0M	
15	FW	(England)	Alex Oxlade-Chamberlain	19	EU	2011	59	6	undisclosed	£12.0M	
16	MF	(Wales)	Aaron Ramsey	22	EU	2008	150	11	undisclosed	£4.8M	
17	DF	(Spain)	Nacho Monreal	27	EU	2013 (Winter)	11	1	undisclosed	£8.5M	
18	DF	(France)	Sébastien Squillaci	32	EU	2010	39	2	2013	£3.3M	
19	MF	(Spain)	Santi Cazorla	28	EU	2012	49	12	undisclosed	£16.5M	
20	DF	(Switzerland)	Johan Djourou	26	EU	2003	144	1	2015	Youth system	On loan to Hannover 96
21	GK	(Poland)	Łukasz Fabiański	28	EU	2007	67	0	undisclosed	£2.0M	
22	MF	(France)	Francis Coquelin	22	EU	2008	43	0	undisclosed	Youth system	
23	MF	(Russia)	Andrey Arshavin	31	Non-EU	2009 (Winter)	144	31	2013	£15.0M	
24	GK	(Italy)	Vito Mannone	25	EU	2005	23	0	2014	£0.35M	
25	DF	(England)	Carl Jenkinson	21	EU	2011	35	0	undisclosed	£1.0M	
26	MF	(Ghana)	Emmanuel Frimpong	21	EU	2009	16	0	undisclosed	Youth system	On loan to Fulham
27	FW	(Ivory Coast)	Gervinho	25	Non-EU	2011	63	11	undisclosed	£10.5M	
28	DF	(England)	Kieran Gibbs	23	EU	2007	106	3	undisclosed	Youth system	
29	FW	(Morocco)	Marouane Chamakh	29	EU	2010	67	14	undisclosed	Free	On loan to West Ham United
30	FW	(South Korea)	Park Chu-young	27	Non-EU	2011	6	1	undisclosed	£1.8M	On loan to Celta Vigo
31	MF	(Japan)	Ryo Miyaichi	20	Non-EU	2011 (Winter)	2	0	undisclosed	Free	
52	FW	(Denmark)	Nicklas Bendtner	25	EU	2004	157	45	undisclosed	Youth system	On loan to Juventus
	MF	(Brazil)	Denílson	25	Non-EU	2006	153	10	undisclosed	£3.5M	On loan to São Paulo
	FW	(Costa Rica)	Joel Campbell	20	Non-EU	2011	0	0	undisclosed	£0.9M	On loan to Real Betis

- Last updated: 19 May 2013
- Source: Arsenal F.C. and footballdatabase.com (for EU passport, country as international player, contract ending and transfer fee)
- Ordered by squad number.

=== Reserve squad ===
As of 5 February 2013.

Note: Flags indicate national team as defined under FIFA eligibility rules; some limited exceptions apply. Players may hold more than one non-FIFA nationality.

No.	Pos.	Nation	Player
36	GK	ARG	Emiliano Martínez
38	DF	SUI	Martin Angha
39	FW	ENG	Zak Ansah
40	DF	ESP	Héctor Bellerín
41	DF	MAR	Samir Bihmoutine
42	DF	GHA	Daniel Boateng
43	GK	ENG	Reice Charles-Cook
44	MF	ENG	Craig Eastmond
45	MF	NED	Kyle Ebecilio
46	MF	GER	Thomas Eisfeld
47	MF	GER	Serge Gnabry
48	DF	SUI	Sead Hajrović
49	DF	ENG	Isaac Hayden
50	MF	IRL	Conor Henderson
51	FW	ENG	Benik Afobe

No.	Pos.	Nation	Player
53	MF	ENG	Jernade Meade
54	DF	ESP	Ignasi Miquel
55	DF	SUI	Elton Monteiro
56	FW	JAM	Nigel Neita
58	MF	ENG	Josh Rees
60	GK	ENG	James Shea
62	FW	ENG	Sanchez Watt
63	MF	ENG	Jordan Wynter
64	MF	ENG	Nico Yennaris
65	MF	ENG	Jack Jebb
66	FW	ENG	Austin Lipman
67	FW	ENG	Chuba Akpom
68	GK	MKD	Dejan Iliev
71	DF	ENG	Brandon Ormonde-Ottewill

=== Transfers ===
==== In ====
#	Position	Player	Transferred from	Fee	Date	Team	Source
9	FW	(Germany) Lukas Podolski	(Germany) 1. FC Köln	Undisclosed (~ £10,900,000)	30 April 2012	First-team	
12	FW	(France) Olivier Giroud	(France) Montpellier	Undisclosed (~ £12,800,000)	26 June 2012	First-team	
19	MF	(Spain) Santi Cazorla	(Spain) Málaga	Undisclosed (~ £15,000,000)	6 August 2012	First-team	
17	DF	(Spain) Nacho Monreal	(Spain) Málaga	Undisclosed (~ £8,500,000)	31 January 2013	First team	

Total spending: ▼ Undisclosed (~ £47,200,000)

==== Out ====
#	Position	Player	Transferred to	Fee	Date	Team	Source
	MF	(England) Jeffrey Monakana	(England) Preston North End	Free transfer (Released)	29 May 2012	Academy	
	DF	(Republic of Ireland) Ben Glasgow	(England) Stoke City	Free transfer	7 June 2012	Academy	
53	MF	(Turkey) Oğuzhan Özyakup	(Turkey) Beşiktaş	£405,000	8 June 2012	Reserves	
50	FW	(Republic of Ireland) Rhys Murphy	(Netherlands) Telstar	Free transfer (Released)	9 June 2012	Reserves	
	MF	(England) Alban Bunjaku	(Spain) Sevilla	Free transfer	28 June 2012	Academy	
	DF	(Scotland) James Campbell	(England) Stoke City	Free transfer (Released)	28 June 2012	Academy	
45	DF	(England) Gavin Hoyte	(England) Dagenham & Redbridge	Free transfer (Released)	10 July 2012	Reserves	
	FW	(Mexico) Carlos Vela	(Spain) Real Sociedad	£5,000,000	17 July 2012	First-team	
	DF	(Brazil) Pedro Botelho	(Brazil) Atlético Paranaense	Free transfer	25 July 2012	Reserves	
1	GK	(Spain) Manuel Almunia	(England) Watford	Free transfer (Released)	31 July 2012	First-team	
47	GK	(Republic of Ireland) Sean McDermott	(Norway) Sandnes Ulf	Free transfer (Released)	8 August 2012	Reserves	
35	DF	(England) Kyle Bartley	(Wales) Swansea City	£1,000,000	16 August 2012	First-team	
10	FW	(Netherlands) Robin van Persie	(England) Manchester United	£25,000,000	17 August 2012	First-team	
17	MF	(Cameroon) Alex Song	(Spain) Barcelona	£15,000,000	20 August 2012	First-team	
	MF	(England) Henri Lansbury	(England) Nottingham Forest	£1,000,000	28 August 2012	Reserves	
38	DF	(England) George Brislen-Hall	(Scotland) Inverness C.T.	Free transfer (Released)	30 August 2012	Reserves	

Total income: ▲ Undisclosed (~ £47,405,000)

==== Loan out ====
#	Position	Player	Loaned to	Date	Loan expires	Team	Source
	MF	(Brazil) Denílson	(Brazil) São Paulo	6 July 2012	End of the season	First team	
	FW	(Costa Rica) Joel Campbell	(Spain) Real Betis	11 July 2012	End of the season	First team	
	FW	(England) Benik Afobe	(England) Bolton Wanderers	3 August 2012	1 February 2013	Reserves	
31	MF	(Japan) Ryo Miyaichi	(England) Wigan Athletic	13 August 2012	9 March 2013 (due to injury)	First team	
	FW	(Brazil) Wellington	(Spain) Ponferradina	15 August 2012	End of the season	Reserves	
	MF	(Bolivia) Samuel Galindo	(Spain) Lugo	23 August 2012	End of the season	Reserves	
	DF	(Ghana) Daniel Boateng	(England) Oxford United	28 August 2012	1 January 2013	Reserves	
	FW	(Republic of Ireland) Philip Roberts	(Scotland) Inverness C.T.	30 August 2012	End of the season	Reserves	
30	FW	(South Korea) Park Chu-young	(Spain) Celta Vigo	31 August 2012	End of the season	First team	
52	FW	(Denmark) Nicklas Bendtner	(Italy) Juventus	31 August 2012	End of the season	First team	
	MF	(England) Chuks Aneke	(England) Crewe Alexandra	7 September 2012	21 January 2013	Reserves	
50	MF	(Republic of Ireland) Conor Henderson	(England) Coventry City	21 September 2012	22 December 2012	Reserves	
	MF	(England) Craig Eastmond	(England) Colchester United	27 September 2012	27 January 2013	Reserves	
62	FW	(England) Sanchez Watt	(England) Colchester United	27 September 2012	27 January 2013	Reserves	
26	MF	(Ghana) Emmanuel Frimpong	(England) Charlton Athletic	19 November 2012	1 January 2013	First team	
29	FW	(Morocco) Marouane Chamakh	(England) West Ham United	4 January 2013	End of the season	First team	
20	DF	(Switzerland) Johan Djourou	(Germany) Hannover 96	5 January 2013	End of the season	First team	
26	MF	(Ghana) Emmanuel Frimpong	(England) Fulham	25 January 2013	End of the season	First team	
	MF	(England) Chuks Aneke	(England) Crewe Alexandra	31 January 2013	End of the season	Reserves	
	MF	(Bolivia) Samuel Galindo	(Bolivia) Wilstermann	7 February 2013	End of the season	Reserves	
	FW	(England) Benik Afobe	(England) Millwall	7 February 2013	7 March 2013 (due to injury)	Reserves	
11	DF	(Brazil) André Santos	(Brazil) Grêmio	11 February 2013	End of the season	First team	
	FW	(England) Anthony Jeffrey	(England) Stevenage	1 March 2013	1 May 2013	Academy	

==== Overall transfer activity ====
===== Spending =====
▼ Undisclosed (~ £47,200,000)

===== Income =====
▲ Undisclosed (~ £47,405,000)

===== Net expenditure =====
▲ Undisclosed (~ £205,000)

== Club ==
=== Coaching staff ===
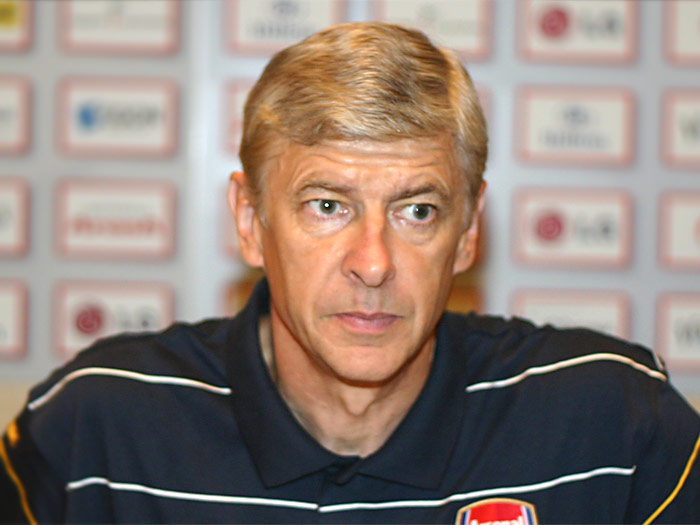
This is Arsène Wenger's 17th season with Arsenal.

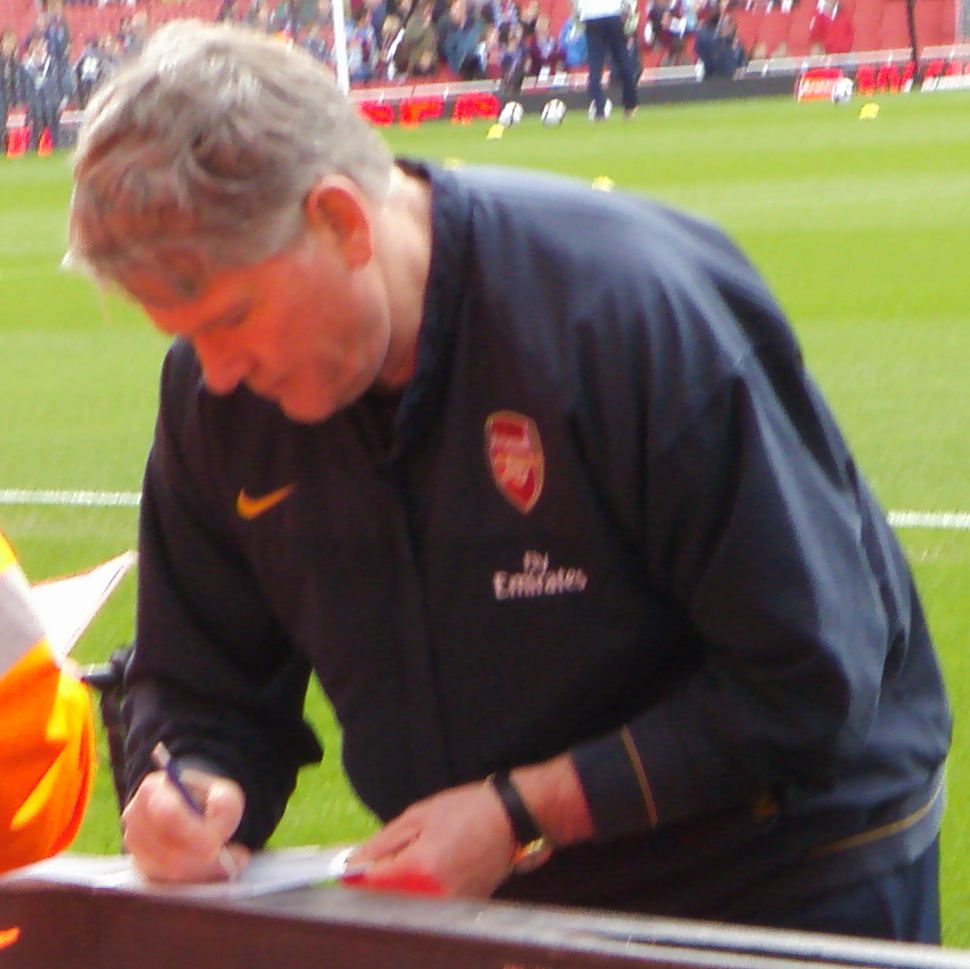
The retirement of Pat Rice allowed the promotion of Steve Bould and Neil Banfield.

Position	Staff
Manager	(France) Arsène Wenger
Assistant manager	(England) Steve Bould^{1}
First team coach	(Bosnia and Herzegovina) Boro Primorac^{1} (England) Neil Banfield^{1}
Goalkeeping coach	(Republic of Ireland) Gerry Peyton
Fitness coach	(England) Tony Colbert (England) Craig Gant
Physiotherapist	(England) Colin Lewin (England) Ben Ashworth (England) Declan Lynch
Kit manager	(England) Paul Johnson (England) Vic Akers (England) Paul Akers
Masseur	(England) Darren Page
Performance analyst	(England) Ben Knapper
Club doctor	(Republic of Ireland) Gary O'Driscoll
Chief scout	(England) Steve Rowley

Last updated: 1 October 2012
Source: Arsenal F.C.

^{1} Steve Bould and Neil Banfield were confirmed as the assistant manager and first team coach respectively, following the retirement of Pat Rice, however Boro Primorac will continue in his position as first team coach.

=== Kit ===
Supplier: Nike / Sponsor: Fly Emirates

Home	Home alt.	Away	Away alt.	Third	Goalkeeper 1	Goalkeeper 2	Goalkeeper 2 alt.	Goalkeeper 3	Goalkeeper 3 alt.

=== Kit information ===
Nike released a new set of home, away and goalkeeper kits for the 2012–13 season. The club reverted to their traditional crest, after using an anniversary crest last season.

- Home: During the final two years with Nike, Nike ditched the white sleeves the club's well known for. The shirt has a white wide stripe on each sleeve, flanked by two dark red, narrower stripes. It has a red V-neck collar which is the same colour as the primary shirt colour. The shirt is complemented by white shorts with a dark-red trim, and white socks with a red horizontal stripe. Red socks with white horizontal stripe were used in some away games. Arsenal revealed that the kit would be used for the next two seasons.
- Away: Arsenal's new away kit, was revealed on 12 July 2012, with the much speculated purple and black hooped kit being officially confirmed. The reason behind the kit was to commemorate Arsenal's past, enhancing the "royal" theme from the Diamond Jubilee to remind Arsenal fans of the Royal Arsenal that once existed through the colour purple. The shirt featured red cuffs and detailing, and additionally featured hoops of different width on the arms. The purple and black hooped socks, bearing one red stripe each, paid tribute to Chapman's legacy and his introduction of hooped socks, which according to him, was said to make it easier for his players to pick each other out on the pitch. The hoops and red trim on the sleeves was designed the kit a modern and unique flavour to distinguish the club from others in the Premier League.
- Third: Arsenal's yellow and maroon 2010–11 away kit was retained as a third kit yet again with club badge reverted to traditional badge after last season with anniversary badge, however the badge on the shorts are monochrome.
- Keeper: Nike launched a new set of goalkeeper strips for the 2012–13 season. The primary strip was predominantly green featuring several tones of the same colour on the arms. The alternatives were pink and gold, based on the same template.

=== Kit Usage ===
- Away: Arsenal's unique away kit produced mix fortunes for the club on the road. Worn in eight games during the season it saw them crash out of the League Cup on penalties to Bradford City, yet whilst still ultimately going out of the competition thanks to a 3–1 defeat at the Emirates, it saw them win 2–0 away to Bayern Munich in the Champions League knockout stages. An early 2–0 win at Anfield against Liverpool in the league saw the only other victory in this shirt. Draws came at Stoke, Southampton and Swansea (FA Cup) whilst three defeats came away to Manchester United, Olympiacos and the previously mentioned game against Bradford City.

=== Other information ===
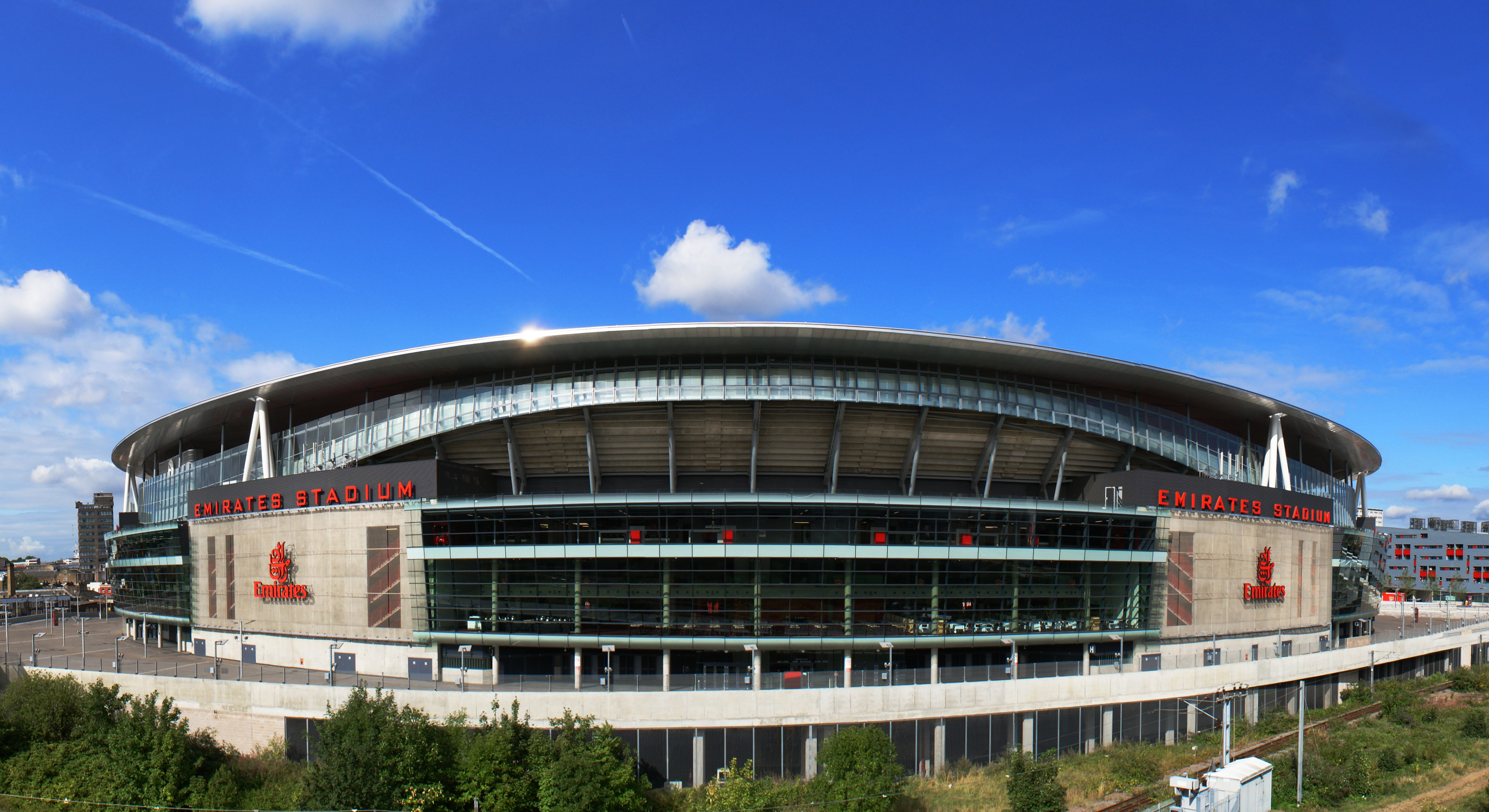
The Emirates Stadium is the second largest stadium in the Premier League.

Chairman	(England) Peter Hill-Wood
Ground (capacity and dimensions)	Emirates Stadium (60,355 / 113x76 metres)

Updated to match played 11 May 2010
Source: Arsenal F.C.

== Squad statistics ==
=== Appearances and goals ===
As of 14 May 2013

No.	Pos	Nat	Player	Total		Premier League		FA Cup		League Cup		Champions League	
No.	Pos	Nat	Player	Apps	Goals	Apps	Goals	Apps	Goals	Apps	Goals	Apps	Goals
1	GK	(Poland) POL	Wojciech Szczęsny	33	0	25+0	0	4+0	0	1+0	0	3+0	0
2	MF	(France) FRA	Abou Diaby	15	0	10+1	0	3+0	0	0+0	0	1+0	0
3	DF	(France) FRA	Bacary Sagna	31	0	25+0	0	2+0	0	1+0	0	3+0	0
4	DF	(Germany) GER	Per Mertesacker	44	3	33+1	3	3+0	0	1+0	0	6+0	0
5	DF	(Belgium) BEL	Thomas Vermaelen	39	1	25+4	0	2+0	0	1	1	7+0	0
6	DF	(France) FRA	Laurent Koscielny	34	4	20+5	2	3+0	0	1+0	1	5+0	1
7	MF	(Czech Republic) CZE	Tomáš Rosický	16	3	7+3	2	2+0	0	0+1	0	2+1	1
8	MF	(Spain) ESP	Mikel Arteta	43	6	34+0	6	2+0	0	0+0	0	7+0	0
9	FW	(Germany) GER	Lukas Podolski	42	16	25+8	11	1+1	1	1+0	0	6+0	4
10	MF	(England) ENG	Jack Wilshere	33	2	20+5	0	2+2	1	1+0	0	3+0	1
11	DF	(Brazil) BRA	André Santos [L]	12	0	3+5	0	1+0	0	1+0	0	1+1	0
12	FW	(France) FRA	Olivier Giroud	47	17	24+10	11	4+0	2	1+1	2	4+3	2
14	FW	(England) ENG	Theo Walcott	43	21	24+8	14	2+2	1	2+0	5	3+2	1
15	FW	(England) ENG	Alex Oxlade-Chamberlain	33	2	11+14	1	2+0	0	1+1	1	3+1	0
16	MF	(Wales) WAL	Aaron Ramsey	47	2	21+15	1	1+2	0	1+0	0	4+3	1
17	DF	(Spain) ESP	Nacho Monreal	11	1	9+1	1	1+0	0	0+0	0	0+0	0
18	DF	(France) FRA	Sébastien Squillaci	1	0	0+0	0	0+0	0	0+0	0	1+0	0
19	MF	(Spain) ESP	Santi Cazorla	49	12	37+1	12	2+1	0	1+0	0	7+0	0
20	DF	(Switzerland) SUI	Johan Djourou [L]	2	0	0+0	0	0+0	0	2+0	0	0+0	0
21	GK	(Poland) POL	Łukasz Fabiański	5	0	4+0	0	0+0	0	0+0	0	1+0	0
22	MF	(France) FRA	Francis Coquelin	22	0	3+8	0	2+0	0	3+0	0	3+3	0
23	MF	(Russia) RUS	Andrey Arshavin	11	1	0+7	0	0+0	0	2+0	1	0+2	0
24	GK	(Italy) ITA	Vito Mannone	13	0	9+0	0	0+0	0	0+0	0	4+0	0
25	DF	(England) ENG	Carl Jenkinson	21	0	14+0	0	1+0	0	1+0	0	5+0	0
26	MF	(Ghana) GHA	Emmanuel Frimpong [L]	2	0	0+0	0	0+0	0	1+1	0	0+0	0
27	FW	(Ivory Coast) CIV	Gervinho	26	7	12+6	5	1+0	0	1+0	0	4+2	2
28	DF	(England) ENG	Kieran Gibbs	34	1	23+4	0	2+1	1	1+0	0	3+0	0
29	FW	(Morocco) MAR	Marouane Chamakh [L]	4	2	0+0	0	0+0	0	1+2	2	1+0	0
30	FW	(South Korea) KOR	Park Chu-young [L]	0	0	0+0	0	0+0	0	0+0	0	0+0	0
31	MF	(Japan) JPN	Ryo Miyaichi	0	0	0+0	0	0+0	0	0+0	0	0+0	0
36	GK	(Argentina) ARG	Emiliano Martínez [R]	2	0	0+0	0	0+0	0	2+0	0	0+0	0
38	DF	(Switzerland) SUI	Martin Angha [R]	2	0	0+0	0	0+0	0	1+0	0	0+1	0
46	MF	(Germany) GER	Thomas Eisfeld [R]	1	0	0+0	0	0+0	0	0+1	0	0+0	0
47	MF	(Germany) GER	Serge Gnabry [R]	4	0	0+1	0	0+0	0	1+1	0	0+1	0
52	FW	(Denmark) DEN	Nicklas Bendtner [L]	0	0	0+0	0	0+0	0	0+0	0	0+0	0
53	MF	(England) ENG	Jernade Meade [R]	2	0	0+0	0	0+0	0	0+1	0	1+0	0
54	DF	(Spain) ESP	Ignasi Miquel [R]	3	1	0+1	0	0+0	0	2+0	1	0+0	0
64	DF	(England) ENG	Nico Yennaris [R]	1	0	0+0	0	0+0	0	1+0	0	0+0	0

[R] – Reserve team player [L] – Out on loan [S] – Sold

=== Top scorers ===
Place	Position	Nationality	Number	Name	Premier League	FA Cup	League Cup	Champions League	Total
1	FW	(England)	14	Theo Walcott	14	1	5	1	21
2	FW	(France)	12	Olivier Giroud	11	2	2	2	17
3	FW	(Germany)	9	Lukas Podolski	11	1	0	4	16
4	MF	(Spain)	19	Santi Cazorla	12	0	0	0	12
5	FW	(Ivory Coast)	27	Gervinho	5	0	0	2	7
6	MF	(Spain)	8	Mikel Arteta	6	0	0	0	6
7	DF	(France)	6	Laurent Koscielny	2	0	1	1	4
8	DF	(Germany)	4	Per Mertesacker	3	0	0	0	3
8	Own goals				3	0	0	0	3
8	MF	(Czech Republic)	7	Tomáš Rosický	2	0	0	1	3
11	FW	(Morocco)	29	Marouane Chamakh	0	0	2	0	2
11	MF	(England)	15	Alex Oxlade-Chamberlain	1	0	1	0	2
11	MF	(Wales)	16	Aaron Ramsey	1	0	0	1	2
11	MF	(England)	10	Jack Wilshere	0	1	0	1	2
15	MF	(Russia)	23	Andrey Arshavin	0	0	1	0	1
15	DF	(England)	28	Kieran Gibbs	0	1	0	0	1
15	DF	(Spain)	54	Ignasi Miquel	0	0	1	0	1
15	DF	(Spain)	17	Nacho Monreal	1	0	0	0	1
15	DF	(Belgium)	5	Thomas Vermaelen	0	0	1	0	1
TOTALS					72	6	14	13	105

=== Disciplinary record ===
Number	Nationality	Position	Name	Premier League		FA Cup		League Cup		Champions League		Total	
Number	Nationality	Position	Name	Yellow card	Red card	Yellow card	Red card	Yellow card	Red card	Yellow card	Red card	Yellow card	Red card
6	(France)	DF	Laurent Koscielny	1	2	0	0	2	0	2	0	5	2
12	(France)	FW	Olivier Giroud	5	1	0	0	0	0	1	0	'6	'1
10	(England)	MF	Jack Wilshere	5	1	0	0	1	0	0	0	6	1
4	(Germany)	DF	Per Mertesacker	3	1	0	0	0	0	1	0	4	1
25	(England)	DF	Carl Jenkinson	2	1	0	0	0	0	0	0	2	1
8	(Spain)	MF	Mikel Arteta	6	0	0	0	0	0	2	0	8	0
16	(Wales)	MF	Aaron Ramsey	5	0	1	0	0	0	2	0	8	0
5	(Belgium)	DF	Thomas Vermaelen	3	0	0	0	1	0	2	0	6	0
19	(Spain)	MF	Santi Cazorla	1	0	0	0	0	0	3	0	4	0
28	(England)	DF	Kieran Gibbs	2	0	1	0	0	0	1	0	4	0
27	(Ivory Coast)	FW	Gervinho	1	0	0	0	1	0	1	0	3	0
9	(Germany)	FW	Lukas Podolski	1	0	0	0	0	0	2	0	3	0
7	(Czech Republic)	MF	Tomáš Rosický	2	0	0	0	0	0	1	0	3	0
3	(France)	DF	Bacary Sagna	2	0	0	0	0	0	1	0	3	0
14	(England)	FW	Theo Walcott	3	0	0	0	0	0	0	0	3	0
29	(Morocco)	FW	Marouane Chamakh	0	0	0	0	1	0	1	0	2	0
22	(France)	MF	Francis Coquelin	0	0	1	0	0	0	1	0	2	0
2	(France)	MF	Abou Diaby	1	0	0	0	0	0	1	0	2	0
17	(Spain)	DF	Nacho Monreal	2	0	0	0	0	0	0	0	2	0
1	(Poland)	GK	Wojciech Szczęsny	1	0	0	0	0	0	1	0	2	0
23	(Russia)	MF	Andrey Arshavin	1	0	0	0	0	0	0	0	1	0
46	(Germany)	MF	Thomas Eisfeld	0	0	0	0	1	0	0	0	1	0
36	(Argentina)	GK	Emiliano Martínez	0	0	0	0	1	0	0	0	1	0
15	(England)	MF	Alex Oxlade-Chamberlain	1	0	0	0	0	0	0	0	1	0
18	(France)	DF	Sébastien Squillaci	0	0	0	0	0	0	1	0	1	0
			TOTALS	46	6	4	0	6	0	26	0	82	5

=== Captains ===
No.	P	Name	Country	No. games	Notes
5	DF	Vermaelen	(Belgium)	35	Club captain
8	MF	Arteta	(Spain)	15	Club vice captain
20	DF	Djourou	(Switzerland)	2	On loan to Hannover 96
4	DF	Mertesacker	(Germany)	1	

Last updated: 19 May 2013
Source: Competitive match reports.
Competitive matches only
Matches started as captain only
Country: FIFA nationality; No.: Squad number; P: Position; Name: Player name; No. Games: Number of games started as captain.

== Pre-season and friendlies ==
14 July 2012 Markus Liebherr Memorial Cup	Arsenal (England)	1 – 0^{(45-minute match)}	(Belgium) Anderlecht	Southampton
18:45 BST	Lansbury 34'	Report		Stadium: St. Mary's Stadium; Referee: Dermot Gallagher (Ireland)

14 July 2012 Markus Liebherr Memorial Cup	Southampton	1 – 1^{(45-minute match)} (5–4 p)	Arsenal	Southampton
20:00 BST	Rodriguez 31'	Report	Gervinho 35'	Stadium: St. Mary's Stadium; Referee: Phil Crossley (Kent)
	Penalties
	Fox (penalty scored); Rodriguez (penalty scored); Seaborne (penalty scored); Chaplow (penalty scored); Hammond (penalty scored)		(penalty scored) André Santos; (penalty scored) Coquelin; (penalty scored) Olsson; (penalty scored) Eastmond; (penalty missed) Ebecilio
Note: Southampton win the Markus Liebherr Cup

24 July 2012	Malaysian XI (Malaysia)	1–2	(England) Arsenal	Kuala Lumpur, Malaysia
21:45 MST (14:45 BST)	Azmi 45+2'	Report	87' Eisfeld; 90' Aneke	Stadium: Bukit Jalil Stadium; Attendance: 58,362; Referee: Suhaizi Shukri (Malaysia)

27 July 2012 China Cup	Manchester City	2–0	Arsenal	Beijing, China
20:00 CST (13:00 BST)	Zabaleta 41'; Y. Touré 44'	Report		Stadium: Bird's Nest Stadium; Attendance: 52,000; Referee: Howard Webb (South Yorkshire)

29 July 2012	Kitchee (Hong Kong)	2–2	(England) Arsenal	So Kon Po, Hong Kong
17:00 HKT (10:00 BST)	Yago 8'; Cancela 28'	Report	24' Walcott; 77' Eisfeld; (yellow card) 80' André Santos	Stadium: Hong Kong Stadium; Referee: Liu Kwok Man (Hong Kong)

5 August 2012	Nigeria	Postponed	(England) Arsenal	Abuja, Nigeria
16:00 WAT (16:00 BST)		Report		Stadium: Abuja National Stadium

12 August 2012	Köln (Germany)	0–4	(England) Arsenal	Cologne, Germany
17:00 CEST (16:00 BST)		Report	6' Vermaelen; 15' (pen.), 43' Podolski; 62' Gervinho	Stadium: RheinEnergieStadion; Attendance: 32,500

Last updated: 12 August 2012
Source: Arsenal F.C.

== Competitions ==
=== Overall ===
Competition	Started round	Final position / round	First match	Last match
Premier League	—	4th	18 August 2012	19 May 2013
League Cup	3rd round	Quarter-finals	26 September 2012	11 December 2012
FA Cup	3rd round	5th round	5 January 2013	16 February 2013
UEFA Champions League	Group stage	Round of 16	18 September 2012	13 March 2013

Updated to match played 19 May 2013
Source: Competitions

=== Premier League ===
==== League table ====
Pos	Team	Pld	W	D	L	GF	GA	GD	Pts	Qualification or relegation
2	Manchester City	38	23	9	6	66	34	+32	78	Qualification for the Champions League group stage
3	Chelsea	38	22	9	7	75	39	+36	75	Qualification for the Champions League group stage
4	Arsenal	38	21	10	7	72	37	+35	73	Qualification for the Champions League play-off round
5	Tottenham Hotspur	38	21	9	8	66	46	+20	72	Qualification for the Europa League play-off round
6	Everton	38	16	15	7	55	40	+15	63	

Source: Barclays Premier League
Rules for classification: 1) Points; 2) Goal difference; 3) Goals scored; 4) Play-offs (only if needed to decide champion, teams for relegation or teams for UEFA competitions).

==== Results summary ====
Overall								Home						Away					
Pld	W	D	L	GF	GA	GD	Pts	W	D	L	GF	GA	GD	W	D	L	GF	GA	GD
38	21	10	7	72	37	+35	73	11	5	3	47	23	+24	10	5	4	25	14	+11

Last updated: 19 May 2013.
Source: Premier League

==== Results by round ====
Round	1	2	3	4	5	6	7	8	9	10	11	12	13	14	15	16	17	18	20	21	22	22	19^{1}	24	25	26	27	28	30	31	32	32	29^{2}	34	35	36	37	38
Ground	H	A	A	H	A	H	A	A	H	A	H	H	A	A	H	H	A	A	H	A	H	A	H	H	H	A	H	A	A	H	A	H	H	A	H	A	H	A
Result	D	D	W	W	D	L	W	L	W	L	D	W	D	D	L	W	W	W	W	D	L	L	W	D	W	W	W	L	W	W	W	W	D	W	D	W	W	W
Position	11	12	8	3	5	8	7	9	6	7	8	6	6	7	10	7	5	4	5	6	6	6	6	6	6	5	5	5	5	5	5	3	4	3	4	4	4	4

Updated to match(es) played on 19 May 2013. Source: Competitive Matches
A = Away; H = Home; W = Win; D = Draw; L = Loss
Notes:
- ^{1} Matchday 19 (vs. West Ham United) was postponed due to a Tube strike on Boxing Day. Subsequently, the match was played on 23 January 2013 at 19:45.
- ^{2} Matchday 29 (vs. Everton) was postponed due to Everton's participation in the FA Cup quarter-final. Subsequently, the match was played on 16 April 2013 at 19:45.

==== Matches ====
18 August 2012 1	Arsenal	0–0	Sunderland	London
15:00 BST		Report		Stadium: Emirates Stadium; Attendance: 60,078; Referee: Chris Foy

26 August 2012 2	Stoke City	0–0	Arsenal	Stoke-on-Trent
13:30 BST	Huth (yellow card) 16'; Wilkinson (yellow card) 64'	Report		Stadium: Britannia Stadium; Attendance: 27,072; Referee: Lee Mason

2 September 2012 3	Liverpool	0–2	Arsenal	Liverpool
13:30 BST	Škrtel (yellow card) 47'; Shelvey (yellow card) 90+1'	Report	(yellow card) 6' Mertesacker; (yellow card) 27' Arteta; 31' Podolski; 68' Cazorla	Stadium: Anfield; Attendance: 44,932; Referee: Howard Webb

15 September 2012 4	Arsenal	6–1	Southampton	London
15:00 BST	Hooiveld 11' (o.g.); Podolski 31'; Gervinho 35', 71'; Clyne 37' (o.g.); Walcott 88'	Report	45' Fox	Stadium: Emirates Stadium; Attendance: 60,097; Referee: Kevin Friend

23 September 2012 5	Manchester City	1–1	Arsenal	Manchester
16:00 BST	Lescott 40'; García (yellow card) 90+2'	Report	82' Koscielny	Stadium: Etihad Stadium; Attendance: 47,318; Referee: Mike Dean

29 September 2012 6	Arsenal	1–2	Chelsea	London
12:45 BST	Ramsey (yellow card) 35'; Gervinho 43'; Vermaelen (yellow card) 53'	Report	20' Torres; (yellow card) 39' Oscar; (yellow card) 48' David Luiz; 53' Mata; (yellow card) 90+3' Ramires	Stadium: Emirates Stadium; Attendance: 60,101; Referee: Martin Atkinson

6 October 2012 7	West Ham United	1–3	Arsenal	London
17:30 BST	Diamé 21', (yellow card) 21'; Reid (yellow card) 36'; Taylor (yellow card) 85'	Report	41' Giroud; (yellow card) 45+1' Gervinho; 77', (yellow card) 77' Walcott; 83' Cazorla	Stadium: Upton Park; Attendance: 34,974; Referee: Phil Dowd

20 October 2012 8	Norwich City	1–0	Arsenal	Norwich
17:30 BST	Holt 19', (yellow card) 62'; Johnson (yellow card) 24'; Hoolahan (yellow card) 55'; Turner (yellow card) 71'	Report		Stadium: Carrow Road; Attendance: 26,825; Referee: Lee Probert

27 October 2012 9	Arsenal	1–0	Queens Park Rangers	London
15:00 BST	Giroud (yellow card) 60'; Arteta 84'	Report	(yellow card) 56' Granero; (red card) 80' Mbia; (yellow card) 87' Taarabt	Stadium: Emirates Stadium; Attendance: 60,103; Referee: Anthony Taylor

3 November 2012 10	Manchester United	2–1	Arsenal	Manchester
12:45 GMT	Van Persie 3', (yellow card) 60'; Young (yellow card) 29'; Cleverley (yellow card) 37'; Rooney (penalty missed) 45', (yellow card) 81'; Evra 67'; Anderson (yellow card) 72'	Report	(yellow card) 14' (yellow-red card) 69' Wilshere; (yellow card) 83' Arshavin; (yellow card) 90' Arteta; 90+5' Cazorla	Stadium: Old Trafford; Attendance: 75,492; Referee: Mike Dean

10 November 2012 11	Arsenal	3–3	Fulham	London
15:00 GMT	Giroud 11', 69'; Podolski 23'; Ramsey (yellow card) 60'; Arteta (penalty missed) 90+5'	Report	29', 67' (pen.) Berbatov; 40' Kačaniklić; (yellow card) 41' Sidwell; (yellow card) 90+5' Baird	Stadium: Emirates Stadium; Attendance: 60,093; Referee: Phil Dowd

17 November 2012 12	Arsenal	5–2	Tottenham Hotspur	London
12:45 GMT	Mertesacker 23'; Podolski 42', (yellow card) 80'; Giroud 45+1'; Cazorla 60'; Walcott 90+1'	Report	11', (red card) 18' Adebayor; (yellow card) 45' Lennon; (yellow card) 66' Sandro; 71' Bale	Stadium: Emirates Stadium; Attendance: 60,111; Referee: Howard Webb

24 November 2012 13	Aston Villa	0–0	Arsenal	Birmingham
17:30 GMT	El Ahmadi (yellow card) 22'	Report		Stadium: Villa Park; Attendance: 34,607; Referee: Lee Mason

28 November 2012 14	Everton	1–1	Arsenal	Liverpool
19:45 GMT	Fellaini 28'; Gibson (yellow card) 30'; Oviedo (yellow card) 70'	Report	Walcott 1'; Gibbs (yellow card) 21'	Stadium: Goodison Park; Attendance: 37,141; Referee: Michael Oliver

1 December 2012 15	Arsenal	0–2	Swansea City	London
15:00 GMT	Vermaelen (yellow card) 85'	Report	Michu 88', 90+2'	Stadium: Emirates Stadium; Attendance: 60,098; Referee: Mark Clattenburg

8 December 2012 16	Arsenal	2–0	West Bromwich Albion	London
15:00 GMT	Arteta 26' (pen.), 64' (pen.); Giroud (yellow card) 54'; Mertesacker (yellow card) 67'	Report	(yellow card) 54' Olsson; (yellow card) 58' Brunt; (yellow card) 78' Reid	Stadium: Emirates Stadium; Attendance: 60,083; Referee: Mike Jones

17 December 2012 17	Reading	2–5	Arsenal	Reading
20:00 GMT	McAnuff (yellow card) 39'; Le Fondre 66'; Kébé 71'	Report	14' Podolski; 32', 35', 60' Cazorla; (yellow card) 72' Wilshere; 80' Walcott	Stadium: Madejski Stadium; Attendance: 24,125; Referee: Anthony Taylor

22 December 2012 18	Wigan Athletic	0–1	Arsenal	Wigan
12:45 GMT	Maloney (yellow card) 86'	Report	(yellow card) 41' Wilshere; 60' (pen.) Arteta	Stadium: DW Stadium; Attendance: 21,754; Referee: Jon Moss

29 December 2012 19	Arsenal	7–3	Newcastle United	London
17:30 GMT	Walcott 20', 73', 90+2'; Chamberlain 50'; Podolski 64'; Giroud 85', 87'	Report	43', 69' Ba; 59' Marveaux; (yellow card) 90' Santon	Stadium: Emirates Stadium; Attendance: 60,087; Referee: Chris Foy

1 January 2013 20	Southampton	1–1	Arsenal	Southampton
17:30 GMT	Ramírez 34'; Schneiderlin (yellow card) 63'; De Ridder (yellow card) 86'	Report	41' (o.g.) Guly	Stadium: St Mary's Stadium; Attendance: 31,743; Referee: Lee Probert

13 January 2013 21	Arsenal	0–2	Manchester City	London
16:00 GMT	Koscielny (red card) 9'; Vermaelen (yellow card) 45+1'; Wilshere (yellow card) 64'	Report	(penalty missed) 10', 32' Džeko; 21', (yellow card) 55' Milner; (yellow card) 72' Clichy; (red card) 75' Kompany; (yellow card) 76' García; (yellow card) 86' Barry	Stadium: Emirates Stadium; Attendance: 60,107; Referee: Mike Dean

20 January 2013 22	Chelsea	2–1	Arsenal	London
13:30 GMT	Mata 6', (yellow card) 66'; Lampard 16' (pen.); Cole (yellow card) 87'	Report	(yellow card) 16' Szczęsny; 58' Walcott	Stadium: Stamford Bridge; Attendance: 41,784; Referee: Martin Atkinson

23 January 2013 23	Arsenal	5–1	West Ham United	London
19:45 GMT	Podolski 22'; Giroud 47', 57'; Cazorla 53'; Walcott 54'	Report	18' Collison; (yellow card) 42' Vaz Tê	Stadium: Emirates Stadium; Attendance: 60,081; Referee: Andre Marriner
Note: This match was rescheduled from Boxing Day 2012.

30 January 2013 24	Arsenal	2–2	Liverpool	London
19:45 GMT	Cazorla (yellow card) 25'; Giroud 64', (yellow card) 85'; Walcott 67'; Mertesacker (yellow card) 90'	Report	5' Suárez; 60' Henderson; (yellow card) 73' Gerrard	Stadium: Emirates Stadium; Attendance: 60,089; Referee: Kevin Friend

2 February 2013 25	Arsenal	1–0	Stoke City	London
15:00 GMT	Podolski 78'	Report	(yellow card) 70' Whelan; (yellow card) 77' Wilkinson; (yellow card) 88' Shawcross	Stadium: Emirates Stadium; Attendance: 59,872; Referee: Chris Foy

9 February 2013 26	Sunderland	0–1	Arsenal	Sunderland
15:00 GMT	Cattermole (yellow card) 2'; Bramble (yellow card) 63'; Larsson (yellow card) 66'; Colback (yellow card) 76'	Report	(yellow card) 9' (yellow-red card) 62' Jenkinson; 35' Cazorla; (yellow card) 83' Walcott	Stadium: Stadium of Light; Attendance: 46,402; Referee: Anthony Taylor

23 February 2013 27	Arsenal	2–1	Aston Villa	London
15:00 GMT	Cazorla 6', 85'; Diaby (yellow card) 37'	Report	(yellow card) 36' Lowton; (yellow card) 66' Delph; 68' Weimann	Stadium: Emirates Stadium; Attendance: 60,079; Referee: Martin Atkinson

3 March 2013 28	Tottenham Hotspur	2–1	Arsenal	London
16:00 GMT	Adebayor (yellow card) 19'; Vertonghen (yellow card) 29'; Bale 37'; Lennon 39'; Walker (yellow card) 90+7'	Report	(yellow card) 30' Ramsey; 51' Mertesacker	Stadium: White Hart Lane; Attendance: 36,170; Referee: Mark Clattenburg

16 March 2013 30	Swansea City	0–2	Arsenal	Swansea
15:00 GMT	De Guzmán (yellow card) 26'	Report	74' Monreal; (yellow card) 83' Arteta; 90+1' Gervinho	Stadium: Liberty Stadium; Attendance: 20,583; Referee: Jon Moss

30 March 2013 31	Arsenal	4–1	Reading	London
15:00 GMT	Gervinho 11'; Cazorla 48'; Giroud 67'; Arteta 77' (pen.)	Report	(yellow card) 32' Guthrie; 69' Robson-Kanu	Stadium: Emirates Stadium; Attendance: 60,082; Referee: Chris Foy

6 April 2013 32	West Bromwich Albion	1–2	Arsenal	West Bromwich
15:00 BST	Morrison 71' (pen.); Jones (yellow card) 78'; Ridgewell (yellow card) 86'	Report	20', 50', (yellow card) 36' Rosický; (yellow card) 25' Ramsey; (yellow card) 65' Koscielny; (red card) 70' Mertesacker; (yellow card) 83' Arteta	Stadium: The Hawthorns; Attendance: 26,144; Referee: Howard Webb

13 April 2013 33	Arsenal	3–1	Norwich City	London
15:00 GMT	Sagna (yellow card) 34'; Arteta 85' (pen.); Giroud 88'; Podolski 90+2'	Report	57' Turner; (yellow card) 84' Bunn; (yellow card) 90+3' Snodgrass	Stadium: Emirates Stadium; Attendance: 60,095; Referee: Mike Jones

16 April 2013 29	Arsenal	0–0	Everton	London
19:45 BST	Arteta (yellow card) 56'; Monreal (yellow card) 90+4'	Report	(yellow card) 28' Gibson; (yellow card) 35' Pienaar; (yellow card) 70' Barkley	Stadium: Emirates Stadium; Attendance: 60,071; Referee: Neil Swarbrick

20 April 2013 34	Fulham	0–1	Arsenal	London
15:00 BST	Sidwell (red card) 12'	Report	43' Mertesacker; (yellow card) 52' Arteta; (yellow card) 76' Ramsey; (red card) 90' Giroud	Stadium: Craven Cottage; Attendance: 25,700; Referee: Andre Marriner

28 April 2013 35	Arsenal	1–1	Manchester United	London
16:00 BST	Walcott 2', (yellow card) 33'; Sagna (yellow card) 43'; Chamberlain (yellow card) 81'	Report	(yellow card) 17' Jones; (yellow card) 24' Rafael; (yellow card) 28', (goal) 44' (pen.) Van Persie; (yellow card) 30' Evans; (yellow card) 65' Valencia	Stadium: Emirates Stadium; Attendance: 60,112; Referee: Phil Dowd

4 May 2013 36	Queens Park Rangers	0–1	Arsenal	London
17:30 BST	Derry (yellow card) 64'; Jenas (yellow card) 78'	Report	1' Walcott; (yellow card) 60' Monreal	Stadium: Loftus Road; Attendance: 18,178; Referee: Jon Moss

14 May 2013 37	Arsenal	4–1	Wigan Athletic	London
19:45 BST	Podolski 11', 68'; Walcott 63'; Ramsey 71'	Report	45', (yellow card) 55' Maloney; (yellow card) 52' Alcaraz	Stadium: Emirates Stadium; Attendance: 60,068; Referee: Mike Dean

19 May 2013 38	Newcastle United	0–1	Arsenal	Newcastle upon Tyne
16:00 BST	Gutiérrez (yellow card) 22'	Report	(yellow card) 39' Rosický; 52' Koscielny; (yellow card) 81' Gibbs	Stadium: St James' Park; Attendance: 52,354; Referee: Howard Webb

Last updated: 19 May 2013
Source: Arsenal F.C.

=== FA Cup ===
6 January 2013 Third round	Swansea City	2–2	Arsenal	Swansea
13:30 GMT	Michu 58'; Bartley (yellow card) 79'; Graham 87'	Report	(yellow card) 35' Ramsey; 81' Podolski; 83', (yellow card) 84' Gibbs	Stadium: Liberty Stadium; Attendance: 18,848; Referee: Howard Webb

16 January 2013 Third round replay	Arsenal	1–0	Swansea City	London
19:30 GMT	Wilshere 86'	Report		Stadium: Emirates Stadium; Attendance: 58,359; Referee: Mark Clattenburg

26 January 2013 Fourth round	Brighton & Hove Albion	2–3	Arsenal	Brighton
15:00 GMT	López (yellow card) 12'; Barnes 33', (yellow card) 73'; Ulloa 62'	Report	16', 56', (yellow card) 56' Giroud; (yellow card) 67' Ramsey; 85' Walcott	Stadium: Falmer Stadium; Attendance: 27,113; Referee: Michael Oliver

16 February 2013 Fifth round	Arsenal	0–1	Blackburn Rovers	London
15:00 GMT	Coquelin (yellow card) 80'	Report	(yellow card) 11' Orr; 72' Kazim-Richards; (yellow card) 89' Goodwillie	Stadium: Emirates Stadium; Attendance: 60,070; Referee: Mike Dean

Last updated: 16 February 2013
Source: Arsenal F.C.

=== League Cup ===
26 September 2012 Third round	Arsenal	6–1	Coventry City	London
19:45 BST	Giroud 39', (penalty missed) 51'; Chamberlain 56'; Arshavin 63'; Walcott 74', 90'; Miquel 80'	Report	(yellow card) 49' Brown; 78' Ball	Stadium: Emirates Stadium; Attendance: 58,351; Referee: Mike Jones

30 October 2012 Fourth round	Reading	5–7 (a.e.t.)	Arsenal	Reading
19:45 GMT	Roberts 12'; Koscielny 18' (o.g.); Leigertwood 20', (yellow card) 71'; Hunt 37'; Morrison (yellow card) 110'; Pogrebnyak 115'	Report	(yellow card) 33' Miquel; 45+2', 90+6', 120+1' Walcott; (yellow card) 55', (goal) 103', 120+4' Chamakh; 64', (yellow card) 78' Giroud; (yellow card) 87', (goal) 89' Koscielny; (yellow card) 114' Martínez; (yellow card) 117' Eisfeld	Stadium: Madjeski Stadium; Attendance: 23,980; Referee: Kevin Friend

11 December 2012 Quarter-finals	Bradford City	1–1 (a.e.t.) (3–2 p)	Arsenal	Bradford
19:45 GMT	Thompson 16'; Wells (yellow card) 68'; Doyle (yellow card) 90+4'; Hanson (yellow card) 120'	Report	(yellow card) 8' Gervinho; 88', (yellow card) 92' Vermaelen	Stadium: Valley Parade; Attendance: 23,971; Referee: Mike Dean
	Penalties
	Doyle (penalty scored); Jones (penalty scored); Darby (penalty missed); Connell (penalty scored); Jones (penalty missed)		(penalty missed) Cazorla; (penalty missed) Chamakh; (penalty scored) Wilshere; (penalty scored) Chamberlain; (penalty missed) Vermaelen

Last updated: 11 December 2012
Source: Arsenal F.C.

=== UEFA Champions League ===
==== Group stage ====
Pos	Team	Pld	W	D	L	GF	GA	GD	Pts	Qualification	SCH	ARS	OLY	MPL
1	(Germany) Schalke 04	6	3	3	0	10	6	+4	12	Advance to knockout phase	—	2–2	1–0	2–2
2	(England) Arsenal	6	3	1	2	10	8	+2	10	Advance to knockout phase	0–2	—	3–1	2–0
3	(Greece) Olympiacos	6	3	0	3	9	9	0	9	Transfer to Europa League	1–2	2–1	—	3–1
4	(France) Montpellier	6	0	2	4	6	12	−6	2		1–1	1–2	1–2	—

Source: Soccerway

18 September 2012 1	Montpellier (France)	1–2	(England) Arsenal	Montpellier, France
19:45 BST	Belhanda 9' (pen.), (yellow card) 84'; Yanga-Mbiwa (yellow card) 41'	Report	(yellow card) 1' Diaby; 16' Podolski; 18' Gervinho	Stadium: Stade de la Mosson; Attendance: 27,522; Referee: Carlos Velasco Carballo (Spain)

3 October 2012 2	Arsenal (England)	3–1	(Greece) Olympiacos	London, England
19:45 BST	Koscielny (yellow card) 29'; Gervinho 42'; Podolski 56'; Ramsey 90+4'	Report	45+1' Mitroglou; (yellow card) 62' Contreras	Stadium: Emirates Stadium; Attendance: 60,034; Referee: Svein Oddvar Moen (Norway)

24 October 2012 3	Arsenal (England)	0–2	(Germany) Schalke 04	London, England
19:45 BST	Vermaelen (yellow card) 15'; Arteta (yellow card) 48'; Ramsey (yellow card) 70'; Gervinho (yellow card) 71'	Report	(yellow card) 15', (goal) 86' Afellay; (yellow card) 39' Höger; 76' Huntelaar	Stadium: Emirates Stadium; Attendance: 60,049; Referee: Jonas Eriksson (Sweden)

6 November 2012 4	Schalke 04 (Germany)	2–2	(England) Arsenal	Gelsenkirchen, Germany
19:45 GMT	Matip (yellow card) 25'; Fuchs (yellow card) 41'; Huntelaar 45+2'; Farfán 67'; Jones (yellow card) 77'	Report	18' Walcott; (yellow card) 21' Cazorla; 26' Giroud; (yellow card) 62' Podolski	Stadium: Veltins-Arena; Attendance: 50,000; Referee: Nicola Rizzoli (Italy)

21 November 2012 5	Arsenal (England)	2–0	(France) Montpellier	London, England
19:45 GMT	Cazorla (yellow card) 39'; Wilshere 49'; Giroud (yellow card) 53'; Podolski 63'; Koscielny (yellow card) 76'	Report	(yellow card) 66' Bedimo; (yellow card) 83' Deplagne	Stadium: Emirates Stadium; Attendance: 59,760; Referee: Fırat Aydınus (Turkey)

4 December 2012 6	Olympiacos (Greece)	2–1	(England) Arsenal	Piraeus, Greece
19:45 GMT	Fesa (yellow card) 51'; Maniatis 64'; Mitroglou 73'	Report	38' Rosický; (yellow card) 54' Coquelin; (yellow card) 64' Szczęsny; (yellow card) 65' Squillaci; (yellow card) 90+2' Chamakh	Stadium: Karaiskakis Stadium; Attendance: 30,000; Referee: Alberto Mallenco (Spain)

==== Knockout phase ====
===== Round of 16 =====
19 February 2013 First leg	Arsenal (England)	1–3	(Germany) Bayern Munich	London, England
19:45 GMT	Vermaelen (yellow card) 15'; Sagna (yellow card) 22'; Arteta (yellow card) 25'; Podolski 55', (yellow card) 66'; Ramsey (yellow card) 67'	Report	7' Kroos; 21', (yellow card) 58' Müller; (yellow card) 36' Schweinsteiger; 77' Mandžukić; (yellow card) 89' Lahm	Stadium: Emirates Stadium; Attendance: 59,974; Referee: Svein Oddvar Moen (Norway)

13 March 2013 Second leg	Bayern Munich (Germany)	0–2 (3a – 3 agg.)	(England) Arsenal	Munich, Germany
19:45 GMT	Lahm (yellow card) 57'; Martínez (yellow card) 83'; Gómez (yellow card) 89'	Report	3', (yellow card) 73' Giroud; (yellow card) 44' Gibbs; (yellow card) 62' Rosický; (yellow card) 80' Mertesacker; (yellow card) 83' Cazorla; 86', (yellow card) 87' Koscielny	Stadium: Allianz Arena; Attendance: 66,000; Referee: Pavel Královec (Czech Republic)

Last updated: 13 March 2013
Source: Arsenal F.C.
