= Les Carter =

Les Carter may refer to:

- Les Carter (musician), member of the group Carter the Unstoppable Sex Machine
- Les Carter (footballer) (born 1960), English former footballer

== See also ==
- Leslie Carter (disambiguation)
