= Leslie Carter (disambiguation) =

Leslie Carter was an American singer.

Leslie Carter may also refer to:

- Leslie D. Carter (1895–1992), United States Army officer
- Mrs. Leslie Carter (1862–1937), actress
- Les Carter (footballer) (born 1960), English footballer
- Fruitbat (Leslie George Carter), English musician

== See also ==
- Les Carter (disambiguation)
- Rob Leslie-Carter (born 1970), British engineer and project manager
