= Neil Banfield =

English footballer and coach

Personal information
- Full name: Neil Anthony Banfield
- Date of birth: 20 January 1962 (age 64)
- Place of birth: Poplar, London, England
- Position: Defender

Team information
- Current team: Bristol City (assistant manager/first-team coach)

Youth career
- 1978–1980: Crystal Palace

Senior career*
Years	Team	Apps	(Gls)
1979–1981	Crystal Palace	3	(0)
1981–1983	Adelaide City	50	(2)
1983–1985	Leyton Orient	31	(0)

International career
1977	England Schoolboys	7	(0)
1979–1980	England U18	13	(0)
1981	England U20	5	(0)

Managerial career
- 1992–1997: Charlton Athletic (head youth coach)
- 1997–2004: Arsenal Academy
- 2004–2012: Arsenal Reserves
- 2012–2018: Arsenal (first-team coach)
- 2019–2022: Queens Park Rangers (first-team coach)
- 2022–2023: Rangers (assistant coach)
- 2024: Wealdstone (assistant manager)
- 2024–2026: Stevenage (assistant manager)
- 2026-: Bristol City (assistant manager)
- * Club domestic league appearances and goals

Neil Banfield (born 20 January 1962) is an English professional football coach and former player.

Banfield played in the Football League for Crystal Palace and Leyton Orient. He became a coach at Charlton Athletic before moving to Arsenal as a youth coach in 1997. From 2012, Banfield spent six years as first-team coach under Arsène Wenger at Arsenal before taking up coaching roles at Queens Park Rangers, Rangers, Wealdstone, Stevenage and, as of July 2026 is assistant manager to Michael Skubala at Bristol City.

== Playing career ==
=== Club ===
Banfield was born on 20 January 1962 in Poplar, London. He played district and England schoolboy and youth football and joined Crystal Palace as an apprentice in August 1979, with whom he won the 1978 FA Youth Cup in a 1–0 victory over Aston Villa. He made only three first-team appearances for Palace and in 1981, joined Australian side Adelaide City for two seasons. In December 1983, he moved to Leyton Orient, making 31 league appearances in two seasons before joining Dagenham and Redbridge in May 1985. He played for non league Woodford Town F.C. after this, including in their FA Cup First Round match v Orient on 15th November 1986.

=== International ===
Banfield was an England schoolboy international, and was a member of the England team that won the 1980 UEFA European Under-18 Championship.

== Managerial career ==
After his retirement as a player, Banfield became a coach. He started his coaching career with Charlton Athletic with whom he spent five years as the head coach at the club's academy. He then joined Arsenal in 1997. Banfield went on to coach Arsenal's academy teams with whom he won two FA Youth Cups, an FA Premier Academy League U17 title in 1999–2000 and an U19 League title in 2001–02. He then succeeded Eddie Niedzwiecki as the coach of Arsenal Reserves after the former's departure for Blackburn Rovers in September 2004.

Banfield also served under Don Givens as the assistant manager of the Republic of Ireland U21 team. He held this post from April 2004 to May of the following year. On 24 May 2012, Banfield took up the position of first-team coach at Arsenal, a role he held until 2018.

On 14 May 2019, Banfield was appointed first-team coach at Queens Park Rangers On 28 November 2022, Banfield joined Michael Beale in moving to Rangers.

In January 2024, Banfield was appointed assistant manager of National League club Wealdstone. He left the club in April when manager David Noble was dismissed, and was appointed assistant manager/first-team coach under Alex Revell at League One club Stevenage on 9 May.

== Honours ==
=== Club ===
Crystal Palace

- FA Youth Cup: 1978

=== Country ===
England U18

- UEFA Under-18 Championship: 1980

=== Managerial career ===
Arsenal Youth

- FA Youth Cup: 2000, 2001
- Premier Academy League U17: 1999–2000
- Premier Academy League U19: 2001–02
