= Les Carter (footballer) =

English footballer

Personal information
- Full name: Leslie Alan Carter
- Date of birth: 24 October 1960 (age 66)
- Place of birth: Farnborough, England
- Position: Forward

Youth career
- ?–1977: Crystal Palace

Senior career*
Years	Team	Apps	(Gls)
1977–1981	Crystal Palace	2	(0)
1981–1982	Bristol City	16	(0)
1983–1984	Adelaide City		
1989–1990	Sunshine George Cross		

International career
1976	England Schoolboys	6	(1)
1979	England Youth	3	(1)
- * Club domestic league appearances and goals

Leslie Alan Carter (born 24 October 1960) is an English former professional footballer who played in the Football League as a forward. He began his youth career at Crystal Palace and was part of the team that won the FA Youth Cup in 1978. He signed professional terms in November 1977, but did not make his senior debut until January 1981. He made one further appearance that season as a substitute and in February 1982, moved on to Bristol City. After only 16 appearances for Bristol City Carter moved on to Australia where he played for Adelaide City.
