= 1990–91 St George-Budapest SC season =

St George-Budapest SC
1990–1991 season
- Chairman: Charles Acsay
- Manager: Frank Arok
- Stadium: St George Stadium
- National Soccer League: 10th
- 1990–91 NSL Cup: First Round
- Aerolineas Argentinas Cup: 1st
- Top goalscorer: Andy Harper (15)
- Highest home attendance: 3,899 vs. Marconi Fairfield (10 November 1990); National Soccer League
- Lowest home attendance: 482 vs. Sunshine George Cross (24 March 1991); National Soccer League
- Average home league attendance: 1,899
- Biggest win: 5–1 vs. Sydney Olympic (27 September 1990); Aerolineas Argentinas Cup
- Biggest defeat: 0-4 vs. APIA Leichhardt (6 January 1991); National Soccer League

1990–91 season saw St George-Budapest SC compete in the National Soccer League, for their fourteenth and final season, under the guidance of head coach Frank Arok. The club finished 10th on the league table, with striker Andy Harper netting 15 goals.

Despite their 10th position, this campaign marked the club's final appearance in the NSL. At the conclusion of the season, the league underwent a major restructure aimed at expanding into new markets, introducing teams from Adelaide, Brisbane, and Newcastle. As a result, St George-Budapest, Sunshine George Cross, and Wollongong Macedonia, were omitted from the competition, leading to St George being relegated to the NSW First Division.

St George ended their NSL journey on a high note, securing a memorable 3–0 victory over Sydney Croatia in their final ever match in the top tier, with goals to Andy Harper, who scored twice, and Matthew Bingley.

In the pre-season, St-George won the Aerolineas Argentinas Cup defeating Marconi Fairfield 2–1, Sydney Olympic 5–1, and Melita Eagles 3–2 to top the group and be crowned winners. Tony Krslovic finished as top goalscorer, scoring 5 goals.

== Players ==
Note: Flags indicate national team as defined under FIFA eligibility rules; some limited exceptions apply. Players may hold more than one non-FIFA nationality.

No.	Pos.	Nation	Player
—	MF	AUS	Zaki Adioski
—	MF	AUS	Elias Augerinos
—	DF	AUS	Scott Baillie
—	MF	AUS	Matthew Bingley
—	MF	AUS	Sašo Boškovski
—	MF	AUS	Adam Ciantar
—	MF	AUS	Andrew Collier
—	MF	AUS	Allan Dean
—	FW	AUS	Andrew Dowling
—	FW	AUS	Randell Easthorpe
—	MF	ARG	Osvaldo El Ali
—	GK	AUS	John Filan
—	FW	AUS	Shaun Freestone
—	GK	AUS	Michael Gibson
—	DF	AUS	Eddie Haragli
—	FW	AUS	Andy Harper
—	DF	AUS	Steve Hickman
—	FW	AUS	Riste Ilijovski

No.	Pos.	Nation	Player
—	FW	AUS	Zoran Ilic
—	MF	AUS	John Kakakios
—	MF	AUS	Safet Katović
—	MF	AUS	Andy Koczka
—	FW	AUS	Tony Krslovic
—	DF	AUS	Dominic Longo
—	MF	AUS	Craig McGregor
—	MF	AUS	Blago Milićević
—	MF	AUS	Craig Moffitt
—	MF	AUS	Jim Morakeas
—	MF	AUS	Jason Petrides
—	MF	AUS	Adem Poric
—	GK	AUS	Andrew Prentice
—	GK	AUS	Mario Saia
—	MF	AUS	Vince Savoca
—	MF	AUS	Manny Spanoudakis
—	MF	AUS	Peter Tsekenis
—	MF	AUS	Cameron Watson

=== Transfers in ===
No.	Pos.	Nat.	Name	Age	Moving from	Type	Transfer window	Ends	Transfer fee	Source
	FW	(Australia)	Randell Easthorpe	24	Wollongong City (Australia)	Transfer	Pre-season		$2,000	
	FW	(Australia)	Vince Colagiuri	26	Marconi Fairfield (Australia)	Transfer	Pre-season		Free	
	DF	(Australia)	Scott Baillie	20	Sydney Macedonia (Australia)	Transfer	Pre-season		Free	
	MF	(Australia)	Theo Kotsias	22	Sydney Macedonia (Australia)	Transfer	Pre-season		Free	
	GK	(Australia)	Andrew Prentice	25	Newcastle Australs (Australia)	Transfer	Pre-season		Free	

=== Transfers out ===
No.	Pos.	Nat.	Name	Age	Moving to	Type	Transfer window	Transfer fee	Source
	DF	(Australia)	David Green	27	Wollongong City	Transfer	Pre-season	$2,000	
	DF	(Australia)	Steve Knight	27	Warringah Dolphins	End of Contract	Pre-season	Free	
	FW	(Serbia)	Vladan Jeremić	25	Free agent	End of Contract	Pre-season	Free	
	MF	(Australia)	Goran Pavlović	28	Free agent	End of Contract	Pre-season	Free	

=== Mid-Season Losses ===
No.	Pos.	Nat.	Name	Age	Moving to	Type	Transfer window	Transfer fee	Source
	FW	(Australia)	Tony Krslovic	21	Sydney Croatia	Transfer	Mid-season	$35,000	

== Competitions ==
=== Overview ===
Competition	First match	Last match	Starting round	Final position	Record							
Competition	First match	Last match	Starting round	Final position	Pld	W	D	L	GF	GA	GD	Win %
National Soccer League	7 October 1990	31 March 1991	Matchday 1	10th	26	6	10	10	34	41	−7	23.08
NSL Cup	21 November 1990	21 November 1990	First round	First Round	1	0	0	1	0	2	−2	0.00
Aerolineas Argentinas Cup	19 September 1990	27 September 1990	First round	1st	3	3	0	0	10	4	+6	100.00
Total					30	9	10	11	44	47	−3	30.00

Last updated: complete
Source: Competitions

=== National Soccer League ===
==== League table ====
Pos	Team	Pld	W	D	L	GF	GA	GD	Pts	Qualification or relegation
1	Melbourne Croatia	26	15	7	4	55	39	+16	37	Qualification for the Finals series
2	South Melbourne (C)	26	14	6	6	45	33	+12	34	Qualification for the Finals series
3	Adelaide City	26	12	9	5	40	24	+16	33	Qualification for the Finals series
4	Marconi Fairfield	26	14	3	9	48	33	+15	31	Qualification for the Finals series
5	Parramatta Eagles	26	10	9	7	38	31	+7	29	Qualification for the Finals series
6	Sydney Olympic	26	8	13	5	31	25	+6	29	
7	Sydney Croatia	26	8	10	8	27	33	−6	26	
8	Preston Makedonia	26	8	9	9	26	27	−1	25	
9	Wollongong City	26	8	8	10	32	34	−2	24	
10	St George-Budapest (R)	26	6	10	10	34	41	−7	22	Relegation to the NSW Division 1
11	APIA Leichhardt	26	7	7	12	27	28	−1	21	
12	Heidelberg United	26	6	9	11	26	37	−11	21	
13	Sunshine George Cross (R)	26	7	3	16	39	53	−14	17	Relegation to the Victorian Premier League
14	Wollongong Macedonia (R)	26	3	9	14	23	53	−30	15	Relegation to the NSW Division 1

Updated to match(es) played on unknown. Source: rsssf.com
Rules for classification: 1) points; 2) goal difference; 3) number of goals scored.
(C) Champions; (R) Relegated

==== Results summary ====
Overall								Home						Away					
Pld	W	D	L	GF	GA	GD	Pts	W	D	L	GF	GA	GD	W	D	L	GF	GA	GD
26	6	10	10	30	42	−12	28	4	5	4	19	24	−5	2	5	6	11	18	−7

=== Matches ===
7 October 1990 1	APIA Leichhardt	2-2	St George-Budapest	Leichhardt, New South Wales
	Bundalo 71'; Murray 90+5'	Report	Krslovic 55'; Harper 59'	Stadium: Lambert Park; Attendance: 3,679; Referee: John McConnell

14 October 1990 2	St George-Budapest	3-2	Preston Makedonia	Banksia, New South Wales
	Krslovic 20', 77'; Harper 87'	Report	Zinni 50', 52'	Stadium: St George Stadium; Attendance: 2,623

21 October 1990 3	Wollongong City	1-0	St George-Budapest	Fairy Meadow, New South Wales
	Morlando 23'	Report		Stadium: Brandon Park; Attendance: 1,850; Referee: Peter Spiers

28 October 1990 4	Sydney Olympic	0-0	St George-Budapest	Banksia, New South Wales
		Report		Stadium: St George Stadium; Attendance: 3,548; Referee: Bill Monteverde

4 November 1990 5	St George-Budapest	2–2	Heidelberg United	Banksia, New South Wales
	Moffitt 62'; Krslovic 70'	Report	O'Shea (og) 58'; Brattan 90+3'	Stadium: St George Stadium; Attendance: 2,173; Referee: John Fraser

10 November 1990 6	St George-Budapest	0–3	Marconi Fairfield	Banksia, New South Wales
		Report	Lowe 43', 64'; Gray 70'	Stadium: St George Stadium; Attendance: 3,899; Referee: John Santa Isabel

15 November 1990 7	Melbourne Croatia	3-2	St George-Budapest	Sunshine North, Victoria
	Kelic 27'; Milosevic 37 (pen)'; Caleta 59'	Report	Krslovic 47 (pen)'; Longo 89'	Stadium: Somers St Stadium; Attendance: 4,000; Referee: Dennis Voutsinas

25 November 1990 8	St George-Budapest	1-2	Melita Eagles	Banksia, New South Wales
	Moffit 86'	Report	Cerro 37'; Brown 74'	Stadium: St George Stadium; Attendance: 1,618; Referee: Peter Spiers

2 December 1990 9	Adelaide City	1-0	St George-Budapest	Hindmarsh, South Australia
	Maxwell 89'	Report		Stadium: Hindmarsh Stadium; Attendance: 3,250; Referee: John Santa Isabel

9 December 1990 10	St George-Budapest	0–0	Wollongong Macedonia	Banksia, New South Wales
		Report		Stadium: St George Stadium; Attendance: 1,694; Referee: Richard Lorenc

16 December 1990 11	South Melbourne	2–1	St George-Budapest	Middle Park, Victoria
	Michelakopoulos 4', 77'	Report	Ilic 57'	Stadium: Middle Park Stadium; Attendance: 3,000; Referee: Chris Bambridge

23 December 1990 12	St George-Budapest	2-0	Sydney Croatia	Banksia, New South Wales
	Bingley 11'; Harper 90+5'	Report		Stadium: St George Stadium; Attendance: 2,498; Referee: Gary Power

30 December 1990 13	Sunshine George Cross	3-1	St George-Budapest	Sunshine, Victoria
	Clarkson 22'; Waddell 71'; Kindtner 89'	Report	Harper 34'	Stadium: Skinner Reserve; Attendance: 2,200; Referee: David Mortimer

6 January 1991 14	St George-Budapest	0-4	APIA Leichhardt	Banksia, New South Wales
		Report	Gomez 35'; Bundalo 66'; Lemezina 80'; McFadden 85'	Stadium: St George Stadium; Attendance: 1,659; Referee: Alex Spiroski

13 January 1991 15	Preston Makedonia	1–1	St George-Budapest	Reservoir, Victoria
	Jackson 37'	Report	Baillie 31'	Stadium: B.T. Connor Reserve; Attendance: 2,100; Referee: John Fraser

20 January 1991 16	St George-Budapest	1–1	Wollongong City	Banksia, New South Wales
	Ilic 49'	Report	Kuc 18'	Stadium: St George Stadium; Attendance: 1,097; Referee: Bill Monteverde

27 January 1991 17	St George-Budapest	0–0	Sydney Olympic	Banksia, New South Wales
		Report		Stadium: St George Stadium; Attendance: 3,762; Referee: Rob Davies

3 February 1991 18	Heidelberg United	0–0	St George-Budapest	Heidelberg West, Victoria
		Report		Stadium: Olympic Village; Attendance: 1,000; Referee: John McConnell

9 February 1991 19	Marconi Fairfield	2–2	St George-Budapest	Bossley Park, New South Wales
	Seal 5 (pen)'; Markovski 36'	Report	Harper 12', 42'	Stadium: Marconi Stadium; Attendance: 3,277; Referee: Peter Spiers

15 February 1991 20	St George-Budapest	3–3	Melbourne Croatia	Banksia, New South Wales
	Harper 12', 59', 72'	Report	Milosevic 26'; Talajcic 35'; Biskic 52'	Stadium: St George Stadium; Attendance: 987; Referee: Bill Monteverde

24 February 1991 21	Melita Eagles	2-1	St George-Budapest	South Granville, New South Wales
	Genc 70'; Soper 74'	Report	O'Shea 90+6'	Stadium: Melita Stadium; Attendance: 2,690; Referee: Gordon Dunster

3 March 1991 22	St George-Budapest	0–2	Adelaide City	Banksia, New South Wales
		Report	Maxwell 63'; Veart 67'	Stadium: St George Stadium; Attendance: 1,159; Referee: Gary Power

10 March 1991 23	Wollongong Macedonia	1–3	St George-Budapest	Fairy Meadow, New South Wales
	Murray 89'	Report	Ilic 55'; Harper 56'; O'Shea 60'	Stadium: Brandon Park; Attendance: 2,759; Referee: John McConnell

17 March 1991 24	St George-Budapest	3–2	South Melbourne	Banksia, New South Wales
	Poric 30'; Harper 41'; O'Shea 77'	Report	Boutsianis 59'; Durakovic 67'	Stadium: St George Stadium; Attendance: 1,285; Referee: Peter Hulme

24 March 1991 25	St George-Budapest	4–3	Sunshine George Cross	Banksia, New South Wales
	Harper 5', 56'; Baillie 25'; Bingley 30'	Report	Kindtner 51', 74'; Mori 83'	Stadium: St George Stadium; Attendance: 482; Referee: Bill Monteverde

31 March 1991 26	Sydney Croatia	0–3	St George-Budapest	Edensor Park, New South Wales
		Report	Harper 12', 83'; Bingley 46'	Stadium: Sydney Croatian Sports Centre; Attendance: 1,896; Referee: Peter Spiers

=== NSL Cup ===
21 November 1990 First round	Adelaide City	2–0	St George-Budapest	Hindmarsh, South Australia
	Melta 18 (pen)'; Mullen 38'	Report		Stadium: Hindmarsh Stadium; Attendance: 1,729; Referee: Mike Ingham

=== Aerolineas Argentinas Cup ===
19 September 1990 Round 1	St George-Budapest	2–1	Marconi Fairfield	Banksia, New South Wales
	Spanoudakis 84'; Krslovic 90'	Report	Markovski 20'	Stadium: St George Stadium

25 September 1990 Round 2	St George-Budapest	5–1	Sydney Olympic	South Granville, New South Wales
	Krslovic ?', ?', ?'; Easthorpe ?'; El Ali ?'	Report	Ironside ?'	Stadium: Melita Stadium

27 September 1990 Round 3	St George-Budapest	3–2	Melita Eagles	Banksia, New South Wales
	Easthorpe 9'; Bingley 34'; Krslovic 85 (pen)'	Report	Brown 40 (pen)'; Cerro 50 (pen)'	Stadium: St George Stadium

== Statistics ==
=== Appearances and goals ===
Players with no appearances not included in the list.

No.	Pos.	Nat.	Name	National Soccer League		NSL Cup		Aerolineas Argentinas Cup		Total	
No.	Pos.	Nat.	Name	Apps	Goals	Apps	Goals	Apps	Goals	Apps	Goals
—	MF	(Australia)	Elias Augerinos	1	0	1	0	3	0	5	0
—	DF	(Australia)	Scott Baillie	23	1	1	0	3	0	27	1
—	MF	(Australia)	Matthew Bingley	12	3	0	0	3	1	15	4
—	DF	(Australia)	Adam Ciantar	12	0	1	0	0	0	13	0
—	FW	(Australia)	Vince Colagiuri	7	0	1	0	0	0	8	0
—	FW	(Australia)	Andrew Dowling	1	0	0	0	0	0	1	0
—	MF	(Argentina)	Osvaldo Eli Ali	24	0	1	0	3	1	28	1
—	GK	(Australia)	John Filan	26	0	1	0	3	0	30	0
—	FW	(Australia)	Randell Easthorpe	9	0	0	0	3	2	12	2
—	DF	(Australia)	Shaun Freestone	10	0	1	0	0	0	11	0
—	FW	(Australia)	Andy Harper	24	15	0	0	3	0	27	15
—	FW	(Australia)	Zoran Ilic	18	3	0	0	0	0	18	3
—	FW	(Australia)	Tony Krslovic	8	5	1	0	3	5	12	10
—	MF	(Australia)	John Kakakios	7	0	0	0	3	0	10	0
—	MF	(Australia)	Safet Katovic	5	0	0	0	0	0	5	0
—	DF	(Australia)	Andy Koczka	24	0	0	0	0	0	24	0
—	MF	(Australia)	Theo Kotsias	7	0	1	0	3	0	11	0
—	DF	(Australia)	Dominic Longo	11	1	1	0	0	0	12	1
—	DF	(Australia)	Blago Milicevic	25	0	1	0	3	0	29	0
—	MF	(Australia)	Craig Moffitt	25	2	1	0	3	0	29	2
—	DF	(Australia)	Mike O'Shea	25	3	0	0	3	0	28	3
—	MF	(Australia)	Andrew Collier	1	0	0	0	0	0	1	0
—	MF	(Australia)	Adem Poric	10	1	0	0	0	0	10	1
—	GK	(Australia)	Andrew Prentice	0	0	0	0	1	0	1	0
—	MF	(Australia)	Manny Spanoudakis	5	0	1	0	3	1	9	1
—	MF	(Australia)	Peter Tsekenis	3	0	0	0	0	0	3	0
