= 1990–91 Sydney Croatia FC season =

Sydney Croatia
1990-1991 season
- Chairman: Laurie Grgić/Tomislav Curić
- Manager: Tony Vržina (Rd 1-18), Steve Watson (Rd 19-26)
- Stadium: Sydney Croatian Sports Centre
- National Soccer League: 7th
- 1990-91 NSL Cup: Second Round
- Top goalscorer: Tony Krslovic (12)
- Highest home attendance: 5,372 vs. Melbourne Croatia (16 January 1991); National Soccer League
- Lowest home attendance: 1,632 vs. Preston Makedonia (10 March 1991); National Soccer League
- Average home league attendance: 3,839
- Biggest win: 4–1 vs. Wollongong City (16 December 1990); National Soccer League
- Biggest defeat: 0–5 vs. Sunshine George Cross (24 February 1991); National Soccer League

The 1990-91 season saw Sydney Croatia embark on its eighth campaign in the NSL. Ultimately, they finished 7th out of 14 teams.

The team commenced the new season with Tony Vržina at the helm, having retained his position as coach from the previous year, but a poor streak of results prompted a coaching change, with assistant Steve Watson assuming the role from Round 19 onwards. Despite showing improvement in their results, heavy home losses to Sunshine George Cross and St George-Budapest saw Sydney Croatia fail to secure a spot in the final series for the third consecutive season.

Tony Krslovic, who returned to the club mid-season from St George-Budapest, finished as the team's top goalscorer with 12 goals.

== Players ==
Note: Flags indicate national team as defined under FIFA eligibility rules; some limited exceptions apply. Players may hold more than one non-FIFA nationality.

No.	Pos.	Nation	Player
—	DF	AUS	Mark Babic
—	MF	AUS	Paul Carter
—	GK	AUS	Tony Franken
—	MF	AUS	Andrew French
—	MF	AUS	John Gibson
—	DF	AUS	Mike Grbevski
—	DF	AUS	Craig Jones
—	DF	CRO	Željko Jurin
—	GK	AUS	Zeljko Kalac
—	FW	AUS	Clayton Koch
—	FW	AUS	Tony Krslovic
—	DF	CRO	Velimir Kuprešak
—	FW	PNG	Manis Lamond

No.	Pos.	Nation	Player
—	FW	CHI	Héctor Pérez
—	MF	CRO	Ivan Petković
—	MF	AUS	Tony Popovic
—	MF	AUS	Pedro Ricoy
—	DF	CRO	Ante Rumora
—	DF	AUS	Robert Runje (Captain)
—	MF	AUS	Wally Savor
—	FW	SCO	Gordon Scott
—	DF	AUS	Robert Stanton
—	MF	ARG	Marcelo Toscanelli
—	MF	AUS	Ned Zelic
—	DF	AUS	Ante Žižić (Youth)

=== Transfers in ===
No.	Pos.	Nat.	Name	Age	Moving from	Type	Transfer window	Ends	Transfer fee	Source
	DF	(Australia)	Robert Runje	21	Preston Makedonia (Australia)	Transfer	Pre-season		$17,000	
	DF	(Australia)	Ned Zelic	19	Canberra Croatia (Australia)	Loan return	Pre-season			
	DF	(Australia)	Paul Carter	27	Blacktown City Demons (Australia)	Loan	Pre-season		Free	
	MF	(Australia)	John Gibson	20	Blacktown City Demons (Australia)	Loan	Pre-season		Free	
	FW	(Scotland)	Gordon Scott	30	Morwell Falcons (Australia)	Transfer	Pre-season		$12,000	
	FW	(Australia)	Clayton Koch	20	Pine Rivers United (Australia)	Transfer	Pre-season		$7,000	
	DF	(Australia)	Robert Stanton	18	AIS (Australia)	Transfer	Pre-season		Free	
	DF	(Australia)	Craig Jones	19	AIS (Australia)	Transfer	Pre-season		Free	
	FW	(Chile)	Héctor Pérez	24	Magallanes (Chile)	Transfer	Round 3		Free	
	MF	(Argentina)	Marcelo Toscanelli	27	Colorado Foxes (United States)	Transfer	Round 3		Free	

=== Transfers out ===
No.	Pos.	Nat.	Name	Age	Moving to	Type	Transfer window	Transfer fee	Source
	FW	(Australia)	Graham Arnold	25	Roda JC (Netherlands)	Transfer	Pre-season	$105,000	
	FW	(Australia)	David Seal	18	Marconi Fairfield (Australia)	Transfer	Pre-season	$35,000	
	DF	(Australia)	Mark Jones	24	Marconi Fairfield (Australia)	Transfer	Pre-season	$20,000	
	FW	(Australia)	David Batten	26	APIA Leichhardt (Australia)	End of Contract	Pre-season	Free	
	MF	(Australia)	Steve Gojević	24	Wollongong Macedonia (Australia)	End of Contract	Pre-season	Free	
	GK	(Australia)	John Krajnović	24	Free Agency	End of Contract	Pre-season	Free	

=== Mid-Season Transfers ===
No.	Pos.	Nat.	Name	Age	Moving from	Type	Transfer window	Ends	Transfer fee	Source
	FW	(Australia)	Tony Krslovic	21	St George-Budapest (Australia)	Transfer	Mid-season		$35,000	

=== Mid-Season Losses ===
No.	Pos.	Nat.	Name	Age	Moving to	Type	Transfer window	Transfer fee	Source
	DF	(Australia)	Alan Hunter	26	Melita Eagles (Australia)	Transfer	Round 6	$16,000	
	DF	(Croatia)	Željko Jurin	30	Wollongong Macedonia (Australia)	Loan	Mid-season	Free	

=== Overview ===
Competition	First match	Last match	Starting round	Final position	Record							
Competition	First match	Last match	Starting round	Final position	Pld	W	D	L	GF	GA	GD	Win %
National Soccer League	7 October 1990	31 March 1991	Matchday 1	7th	26	8	10	8	27	33	−6	30.77
NSL Cup	21 November 1990	21 November 1990	First round	First Round	1	0	0	1	0	1	−1	0.00
Total					27	8	10	9	27	34	−7	29.63

Last updated: complete
Source: Competitions

=== League table ===
Pos	Team	Pld	W	D	L	GF	GA	GD	Pts	Qualification or relegation
1	Melbourne Croatia	26	15	7	4	55	39	+16	37	Qualification for the Finals series
2	South Melbourne (C)	26	14	6	6	45	33	+12	34	Qualification for the Finals series
3	Adelaide City	26	12	9	5	40	24	+16	33	Qualification for the Finals series
4	Marconi Fairfield	26	14	3	9	48	33	+15	31	Qualification for the Finals series
5	Parramatta Eagles	26	10	9	7	38	31	+7	29	Qualification for the Finals series
6	Sydney Olympic	26	8	13	5	31	25	+6	29	
7	Sydney Croatia	26	8	10	8	27	33	−6	26	
8	Preston Makedonia	26	8	9	9	26	27	−1	25	
9	Wollongong City	26	8	8	10	32	34	−2	24	
10	St George-Budapest (R)	26	6	10	10	34	41	−7	22	Relegation to the NSW Division 1
11	APIA Leichhardt	26	7	7	12	27	28	−1	21	
12	Heidelberg United	26	6	9	11	26	37	−11	21	
13	Sunshine George Cross (R)	26	7	3	16	39	53	−14	17	Relegation to the Victorian Premier League
14	Wollongong Macedonia (R)	26	3	9	14	23	53	−30	15	Relegation to the NSW Division 1

Updated to match(es) played on unknown. Source: rsssf.com
Rules for classification: 1) points; 2) goal difference; 3) number of goals scored.
(C) Champions; (R) Relegated

=== Matches ===
7 October 1990 1	Sydney Croatia	1-0	Marconi Fairfield	Edensor Park, New South Wales
	Scott 65'	Report		Stadium: Sydney Croatian Sports Centre; Attendance: 5,246; Referee: Richard Lorenc

14 October 1991 2	Melbourne Croatia	2-0	Sydney Croatia	Sunshine North, Victoria
	Milosevic 52'; Selemidis 78'	Report		Stadium: Somers St; Attendance: 4,500; Referee: Peter Spiers

21 October 1990 3	Sydney Croatia	1-1	Melita Eagles	Edensor Park, New South Wales
	Ricoy 69'	Report	Brown 87'	Stadium: Sydney Croatian Sports Centre; Attendance: 3,879; Referee: Peter Hulme

31 October 1990 4	Adelaide City	1–1	Sydney Croatia	Hindmarsh, South Australia
	Tapai 18'	Report	Gibson 45'	Stadium: Hindmarsh Stadium; Attendance: 2,500; Referee: David Mortimer

4 November 1990 5	Sydney Croatia	2-1	Wollongong Macedonia	Edensor Park, New South Wales
	Scott 4'; Ricoy 46'	Report	Thornthwaite 24'	Stadium: Sydney Croatian Sports Centre; Attendance: 3,777; Referee: Richard Lorenc

11 November 1990 6	Sydney Croatia	0–0	South Melbourne	Edensor Park, New South Wales
		Report		Stadium: Sydney Croatian Sports Centre; Attendance: 3,579; Referee: Richard Lorenc

18 November 1990 7	Sydney Olympic	1–1	Sydney Croatia	Banksia, New South Wales
	Ironside 70'	Report	Kupresak 15'	Stadium: St George Stadium; Attendance: 4,933; Referee: Chris Bambridge

25 November 1990 8	Sunshine George Cross	1-1	Sydney Croatia	Braybrook, Victoria
	Ketsakidis 38'	Report	Popovic 20'	Stadium: Skinner Reserve; Attendance: 3,000; Referee: Rob Davies

2 December 1990 9	Sydney Croatia	2-1	APIA Leichhardt	Edensor Park, New South Wales
	Krslovic 64', 86'	Report	McQuarrie 51'	Stadium: Sydney Croatian Sports Centre; Attendance: 3,852; Referee: Dennis Voutsinas

9 December 1990 10	Preston Makedonia	1-0	Sydney Croatia	Reservoir, Victoria
	Trajanovski 88'	Report		Stadium: B.T. Connor Reserve; Attendance: 2,800; Referee: Chris Bambridge

16 December 1990 11	Sydney Croatia	4-1	Wollongong City	Edensor Park, New South Wales
	Krslovic 2', 68', 74'; Lamond 23'	Report	Brodnik 10'	Stadium: Sydney Croatian Sports Centre; Attendance: 3,625; Referee: Richard Lorenc

23 December 1990 12	St George-Budapest	2–0	Sydney Croatia	Banksia, New South Wales
	Bingley 11'; Harper 90+5'	Report		Stadium: St George Stadium; Attendance: 2,498; Referee: Gary Power

30 December 1990 13	Sydney Croatia	1-1	Heidelberg United	Edensor Park, New South Wales
	Gibson 1'	Report	Rizopoulos 26'	Stadium: Sydney Croatian Sports Centre; Attendance: 2,976; Referee: John McConnell

6 January 1991 14	Marconi Fairfield	2–2	Sydney Croatia	Bossley Park, New South Wales
	Grbevski (og) 45'; Jones 52'	Report	Krslovic 37', 76'	Stadium: Marconi Stadium; Attendance: 6,250; Referee: John Santa Isabel

13 January 1991 15	Sydney Croatia	3-4	Melbourne Croatia	Edensor Park, New South Wales
	Kupresak 6'; Krslovic 20', 90+2'	Report	Awaritefe 28', 75'; Kelic 37', 85'	Stadium: Sydney Croatian Sports Centre; Attendance: 5,372; Referee: Peter Spiers

20 January 1991 16	Melita Eagles	1-1	Sydney Croatia	South Granville, New South Wales
	Brown 75'	Report	Kupresak 74'	Stadium: Melita Stadium; Attendance: 4,379; Referee: Alex Spiroski

27 January 1991 17	Sydney Croatia	0-1	Adelaide City	Edensor Park, New South Wales
		Report	Csoboth 76'	Stadium: Sydney Croatian Sports Centre; Attendance: 2,849; Referee: John McConnell

3 February 1991 18	Wollongong Macedonia	1-0	Sydney Croatia	Fairy Meadow, New South Wales
	Z.Markovski 88'	Report		Stadium: Brandon Park; Attendance: 3,844; Referee: Rob Davies

9 February 1991 19	South Melbourne	1-2	Sydney Croatia	Middle Park, Victoria
	Michalakopoulos 78'	Report	Krslovic 49'; Gibson 80'	Stadium: Middle Park; Attendance: 4,000; Referee: Richard Lorenc

17 February 1991 20	Sydney Croatia	1-0	Sydney Olympic	Edensor Park, New South Wales
	C.Koch 36'	Report		Stadium: Sydney Croatian Sports Centre; Attendance: 5,349; Referee: Peter Spiers

24 February 1991 21	Sydney Croatia	0-5	Sunshine George Cross	Edensor Park, New South Wales
		Report	D.Hunter 10', 85', 89'; Hasler 16'; Mori 82'	Stadium: Sydney Croatian Sports Centre; Attendance: 1,876; Referee: Mike Ingham

13 March 1991 22	APIA Leichhardt	0-1	Sydney Croatia	Leichhardt, New South Wales
		Report	Krslovic 42'	Stadium: Leichhardt; Attendance: 986; Referee: Peter Spiers

10 March 1991 23	Sydney Croatia	0-0	Preston Makedonia	Edensor Park, New South Wales
		Report		Stadium: Sydney Croatian Sports Centre; Attendance: 1,632; Referee: Richard Lorenc

17 March 1991 24	Wollongong City	1-2	Sydney Croatia	Fairy Meadow, New South Wales
	Hollifield 41'	Report	Grbevski 47'; Stanton 90'	Stadium: Brandon Park; Attendance: 2,525; Referee: Dennis Voutsinas

24 March 1991 25	Heidelberg United	1-1	Sydney Croatia	Melbourne, Victoria
	Herd 90'	Report	Krslovic 52'	Stadium: Olympic Park; Attendance: 2,200; Referee: Tom McRoe

31 March 1991 26	Sydney Croatia	0-3	St George-Budapest	Edensor Park, New South Wales
		Report	Harper 12', 83'; Bingley 46'	Stadium: Sydney Croatian Sports Centre; Attendance: 1,896; Referee: Peter Spiers

=== NSL Cup ===
21 November 1990 First round	Marconi Fairfield	1-0	Sydney Croatia	Bossley Park, New South Wales
	Nastevski 58'	Report		Stadium: Marconi Stadium; Attendance: 1,443; Referee: Peter Spiers

== Statistics ==
=== Appearances and goals ===
Players with no appearances not included in the list.

No.	Pos.	Nat.	Name	National Soccer League		NSL Cup		Total	
No.	Pos.	Nat.	Name	Apps	Goals	Apps	Goals	Apps	Goals
—	DF	(Australia)	Mark Babic	5	0	0	0	5	0
—	MF	(Australia)	Paul Carter	26	0	1	0	27	0
—	GK	(Australia)	Tony Franken	26	0	0	0	26	0
—	MF	(Australia)	John Gibson	22	3	1	0	23	3
—	DF	(Australia)	Mike Grbevski	17	1	0	0	17	1
—	FW	(Australia)	Clayton Koch	23	1	1	0	24	1
—	GK	(Australia)	Zeljko Kalac	0	0	1	0	1	0
—	FW	(Australia)	Tony Krslovic	16	12	0	0	16	12
—	DF	(Croatia)	Velimir Kuprešak	19	3	1	0	20	3
—	FW	(Papua New Guinea)	Manis Lamond	19	1	1	0	20	1
—	FW	(Chile)	Héctor Pérez	1	0	0	0	1	0
—	MF	(Croatia)	Ivan Petković	26	0	1	0	27	0
—	MF	(Australia)	Tony Popovic	17	1	1	0	18	1
—	MF	(Australia)	Pedro Ricoy	22	2	1	0	23	2
—	DF	(Croatia)	Ante Rumora	6	0	0	0	6	0
—	DF	(Australia)	Robert Runje	21	0	1	0	22	0
—	DF	(Australia)	Robert Stanton	23	1	1	0	24	2
—	MF	(Australia)	Wally Savor	6	0	0	0	6	0
—	MF	(Scotland)	Gordon Scott	8	2	0	0	8	2
—	MF	(Argentina)	Marcelo Toscanelli	1	0	0	0	1	0
—	MF	(Australia)	Ned Zelic	26	0	1	0	27	0
Players who left during the season
—	DF	(Croatia)	Zeljko Jurin	6	0	1	0	7	0
