= List of Western United FC (women) records and statistics =

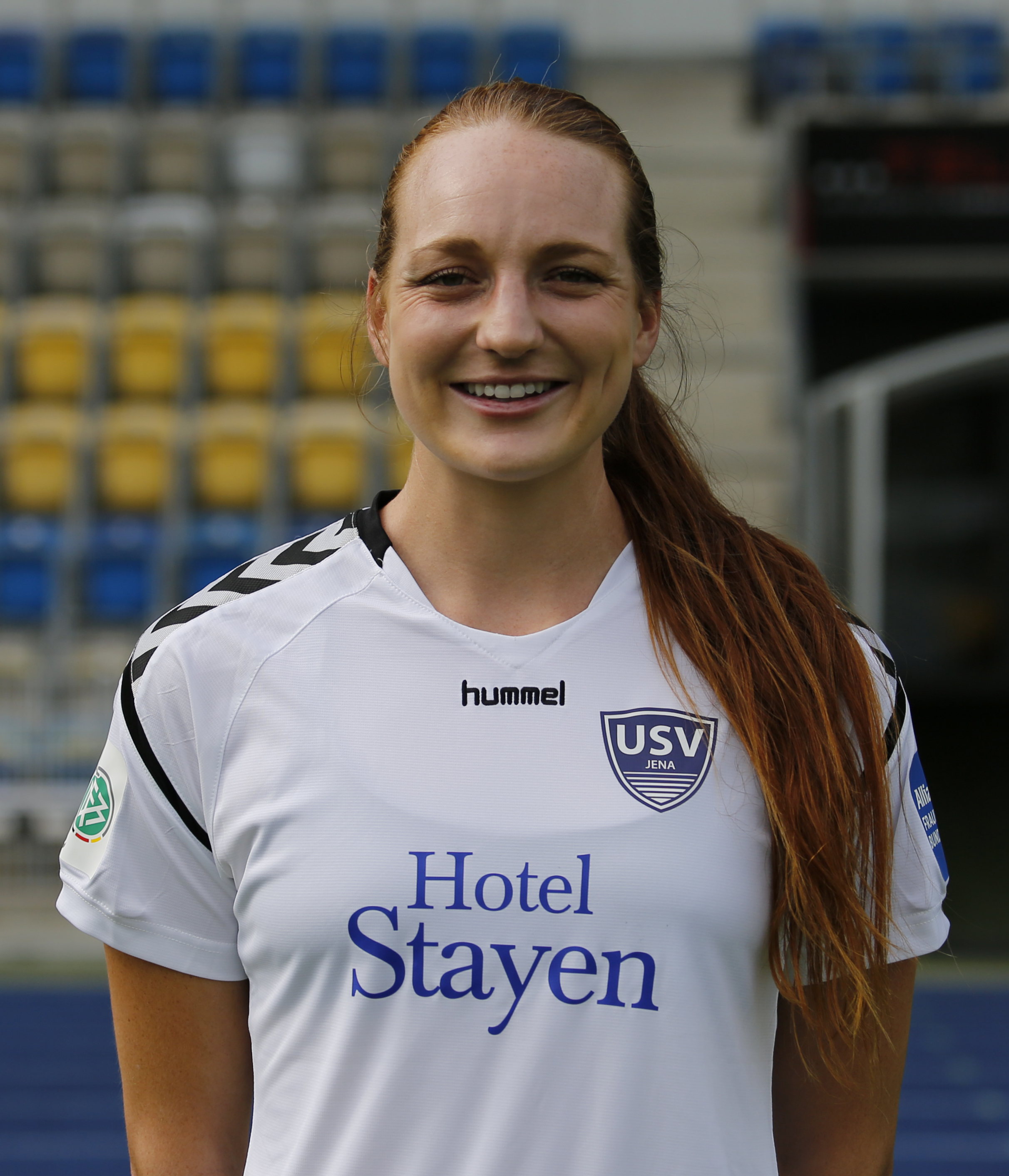
Hannah Keane is Western United (A-League Women)'s record goalscorer.

Western United Football Club (women) is a women's soccer club based in Truganina, Melbourne. The club was formed in 2022 being admitted into the A-League Women in the 2022–23 season.

The list encompasses records set by the club, their managers and their players. The player records section itemises the club's leading goalscorers and those who have made most appearances. Attendance records at the Wyndham Regional Football Facility, the club's home ground since 2024, and City Vista Recreation Reserve, their temporary home from 2022 to 2024 are also included.

All figures are correct as of 27 April 2025.

== Honours ==
- A-League Women Premiership

Runners-up (1): 2022–23

- A-League Women Championship

Runners-up (1): 2023

== Player records ==
=== Appearances ===
- Most appearances: Melissa Taranto, 60
- Youngest first-team player: Avaani Prakash, 16 years, 327 days (against Melbourne City, 5 November 2023)
- Oldest first-team player: Aleksandra Sinclair, 35 years, 30 days (against Newcastle Jets, 26 February 2023)
- Most consecutive appearances: Grace Maher, 47

==== Most appearances ====
Competitive matches only, includes appearances as substitute. Numbers in brackets indicate goals scored.

Rank	Player	Years	A-League Women		Total
Rank	Player	Years	Regular season	Finals series	Total
1	(Australia) Melissa Taranto	2022–2025	56 (4)	4 (0)	60 (4)
2	(Australia) Adriana Taranto	2022–2025	53 (6)	3 (0)	56 (6)
3	(Australia) Alana Cerne	2022–2025	50 (0)	3 (1)	53 (1)
4	(Australia) Kahli Johnson	2022–2025	45 (13)	3 (0)	48 (13)
5	(Australia) Grace Maher	2023–2025	45 (4)	2 (0)	47 (4)
5	(Australia) Julia Sardo	2022–2025	45 (4)	2 (0)	47 (4)
7	(Australia) Chloe Logarzo	2022–2025	44 (18)	1 (0)	45 (18)
8	(Japan) Keiwa Hieda	2022–2025	38 (6)	2 (0)	40 (6)
8	(United States) Hannah Keane	2022–2024	38 (23)	2 (1)	40 (24)
8	(Australia) Aimee Medwin	2022–2025	38 (3)	2 (0)	40 (3)

=== Goalscorers ===
- Top goalscorer: Hannah Keane, 24
- Most goals in a season: Hannah Keane, 14 goals (in the 2022–23 season)
- Youngest goalscorer: Kahli Johnson, 19 years, 8 days (against Newcastle Jets, 26 February 2023)
- Oldest goalscorer: Jessica McDonald, 34 years, 271 days (against Wellington Phoenix, 26 November 2022)
- Most consecutive goalscoring appearances: Hannah Keane, 4 matches (11 January 2023 – 28 January 2023)

==== Top goalscorers ====
Competitive matches only. Numbers in brackets indicate appearances made.

Rank	Player	Years	A-League Women		Total
Rank	Player	Years	Regular season	Finals series	Total
1	(United States) Hannah Keane	2022–2024	23 (38)	1 (2)	24 (40)
2	(Australia) Chloe Logarzo	2022–2025	18 (44)	0 (1)	18 (45)
3	(Australia) Kahli Johnson	2022–2025	13 (45)	0 (3)	13 (48)
4	(United States) Catherine Zimmerman	2023–2025	7 (20)	1 (2)	8 (22)
5	(Japan) Keiwa Hieda	2022–2025	6 (38)	0 (2)	6 (40)
5	(Australia) Adriana Taranto	2022–2025	6 (53)	0 (3)	6 (56)
7	(Guyana) Sydney Cummings	2022–2025	4 (18)	0 (2)	4 (20)
7	(Australia) Grace Maher	2023–2025	4 (45)	0 (2)	4 (47)
7	(Australia) Melissa Taranto	2022–2025	4 (56)	0 (4)	4 (60)
7	(Serbia) Tyla-Jay Vlajnic	2022–2024	4 (32)	0 (3)	4 (35)

== Head coach records ==
- First head coach: Mark Torcaso coached Western United (women) from 29 June 2022 to 1 December 2023.
- Longest-serving head coach: Kat Smith – 1 year, 276 days (4 December 2023 to 6 September 2025)
- Shortest tenure as head coach: Mark Torcaso – 1 year, 155 days (29 June 2022 to 1 December 2023)
- Highest win percentage: Mark Torcaso, 53.85%
- Lowest win percentage: Kat Smith, 37.50%

== Club records ==
=== Matches ===
==== Firsts ====
- First match: Western United 1–0 Melbourne Victory, friendly, 5 November 2022
- First A-League Women match: Western United 1–0 Melbourne Victory, 19 November 2022
- First finals match: Sydney FC 0–1 Western United, Semi-finals, 16 April 2023

==== Record results ====
- Record win: 6–0 against Newcastle Jets, 26 February 2023
- Record defeat: 2–8 against Brisbane Roar, 29 December 2024
- Record consecutive wins: 7, from 19 November 2022 to 11 January 2023
- Record consecutive defeats: 3
  - from 5 March 2023 to 25 March 2023
  - from 9 March 2024 to 23 March 2024
- Record consecutive matches without a defeat: 7, from 19 November 2022 to 11 January 2023
- Record consecutive matches without a win: 5, from 9 March 2024 to 13 April 2024
- Record consecutive matches without conceding a goal: 2
  - from 7 January 2023 to 11 January 2023
  - from 21 January 2023 to 28 January 2023
- Record consecutive matches without scoring a goal: 3, from 5 March 2023 to 25 March 2023

=== Goals ===
- Most league goals scored in a season: 39 in 23 matches, 2024–25
- Fewest league goals scored in a season: 37 in 22 matches, 2023–24
- Most league goals conceded in a season: 46 in 23 matches, 2024–25
- Fewest league goals conceded in a season: 20 in 18 matches, 2022–23

=== Points ===
- Most points in a season: 39 in 18 matches, 2022–23
- Fewest points in a season: 33 in 23 matches, 2024–25

=== Attendances ===
This section applies to attendances at Ironbark Fields, the club's home, and City Vista Recreation Reserve, their temporary home from 2022 to 2024.

- Highest home attendance at Ironbark Fields: 3,370, against Newcastle Jets, Elimination-finals, 13 April 2024
- Lowest home attendance at Ironbark Fields: 503
  - against Perth Glory, 21 January 2025
  - against Canberra United, 14 March 2025
- Highest home attendance at City Vista: 2,753, against Melbourne Victory, 19 November 2022
- Lowest home attendance at City Vista: 361, against Western Sydney Wanderers, 1 April 2023
- Lowest home attendance: 320, against Newcastle Jets, Morshead Park Stadium, 8 February 2023
