= National Youth League (1981–2004) =

- Founded: 1981
- Folded: 2004
- Country: Australia
- Most championships: Melbourne Knights, South Melbourne, Australian Institute of Sport, (3 titles each)

The National Youth League (NYL), was an Australian national soccer league run in parallel to the National Soccer League (NSL) between 1984 and 2004. The aim of the league was to provide a pathway for young players to play regular high-level football, and allow reserve players from senior NSL teams to remain match fit. The league was founded in 1981, alongside the simultaneous expansion of the senior competition. The league later followed the NSL's move to summer competition during the switch to summer play in 1989.

The competition was split into Northern and Southern divisions, with the winners of each division playing off in a grand final to decide the national champion. The Southern division included teams mostly from Victoria, but also sides from South Australia. The Northern division contained teams from the Australian Capital Territory, New South Wales and Queensland. Teams were drawn from NSL clubs, state league clubs, regional representative sides as well as the programs of the various state-run sports institutes, such as the Australian Institute of Sport's Football Program. The competition ceased operation in 2004, at the same time the NSL ended. While the A-League replaced the NSL in 2005, after a season's recess, the NYL was not succeeded by the A-League National Youth League until 2008.

== Champions ==
Year	Champion	Runner up	Score
1984	South Melbourne Hellas	Melita Eagles	3–2
1985	Sydney City	Heidelberg Alexander	3–0
1986	Australian Institute of Sport	Sunshine George Cross	3–0
1987	Sydney Olympic	Sunshine George Cross	1–0
1988	Marconi	Sunshine George Cross	2–1
1989	Sunshine George Cross	Marconi	3–2
1989–90	Melbourne Croatia	APIA Leichhardt	2–1
1990–91	South Melbourne	Sydney Olympic	3–2
1991–92	Sydney Croatia	South Melbourne	3–1
1992–93	West Adelaide	Australian Institute of Sport	1–0
1993–94	South Melbourne	Sydney United	2–0
1994–95	Sydney United	Melbourne Knights	1–0
1995–96	Marconi Stallions	West Adelaide	3–1
1996–97	Melbourne Knights	Sydney United	1–0
1997–98	Australian Institute of Sport	Adelaide City	4–1
1998–99	Australian Institute of Sport	Adelaide City	8–1
1999–2000	Carlton	Parramatta Power	1–0
2000–01	Melbourne Knights	Marconi Stallions	3–2
2001–02	Parramatta Power	Melbourne Knights	2–0
2002–03	Parramatta Power	Whittlesea Stallions	6–2
2003–04	Canberra Deakin	South Melbourne	2–1

=== Performance by team ===
Club	Winners	Runners-up	Winning years
Melbourne Knights	3	2	1989–90, 1996–97, 2000–01
South Melbourne	3	2	1984, 1990–91, 1993–94
Australian Institute of Sport	3	1	1986, 1997–98, 1998–99,
Marconi Stallions	2	2	1988, 1995–96
Sydney United	2	2	1991–92, 1994–95
Parramatta Power	2	1	2001–02, 2002–03
Sunshine George Cross	1	3	1989
Sydney Olympic	1	1	1987
West Adelaide	1	1	1992–93
Carlton	1	0	1999–2000
Canberra Deakin	1	0	2003–04
Sydney City	1	0	1985

== See also ==
- National Soccer League
- A-League Youth
