= Andrew Callanan =

Australian soccer player

Personal information
- Date of birth: 30 August 1966 (age 60)
- Position: Midfielder

Senior career*
Years	Team	Apps	(Gls)
1988–1992	Melita Eagles	66	(5)
1991	Blacktown City		

International career
1991	Australia	2	(0)
- * Club domestic league appearances and goals

Andrew Callanan (born 30 August 1966) is an Australian former soccer player.

== Club career ==
Callanan played for the Melita Eagles (now Parramatta FC) between 1998 and 1992. He spent time with Blacktown City in 1991.

== International career ==
Callanan made two official appearances for Australia, although also represented them for three other games that were not considered full international matches.

Callanan's only official international caps for Australia were against New Zealand as a part of the Trans-Tasman Cup in 1991. He started both games and helped Australia to victory twice.

== Honours ==
Melita Eagles

- NSL Cup: 1990–91
