= 1985 Chatham Cup =

Tournament details
- Venue(s): Mount Smart Stadium, Auckland
- Dates: 7 September 1985

Final positions
- Champions: Napier City Rovers (1st title)
- Runners-up: North Shore United

Awards
- Jack Batty Memorial Cup: Greg Brown (Napier City Rovers)

The 1985 Chatham Cup was the 58th annual nationwide knockout football competition in New Zealand.

Early stages of the competition were run in three regions (northern, central, and southern), with the National League teams receiving a bye into the Fourth Round (last 32) of the competition. In all, 141 teams took part in the competition. Note: Different sources give different numberings for the rounds of the competition: some start round one with the beginning of the regional qualifications; others start numbering from the first national knock-out stage. The former numbering scheme is used in this article.

== The 1985 final ==
In the final Napier City Rovers beat North Shore United. Underdogs Napier had recently finished bottom of the 1985 New Zealand National Soccer League and faced a team containing international players Allan Boath and Keith Hobbs. Shore's keeper Allan Gilgrist was also soon to make his international debut. Expectation was that City Rovers would be heavily outclassed.

Napier defied the odds by dominating the match, going into the lead after just two minutes via a Harry Clarke goal. Paul Halford added a second before half time. Shore scored early in the second half through Barry Weymouth, but Greg Brown sealed the match for Napier in the dying minutes of the match. Napier were relegated the following week after losing to Manawatu United in the Promotion-Relegation play-offs in Palmerston North a week later. Thus Napier became the second team (after Western Suburbs FC in 1971) to be relegated and win the Chatham Cup in the same season.

=== Jack Batty Memorial Cup ===
The Jack Batty Memorial Cup, presented to the player of the final, was presented for the first time in 1985. The trophy honours Jack Batty, who was both a member of the crew of HMS Chatham and also a three-time medallist in the early days of the tournament with Harbour Board, Tramways, and Tramurewa. The cup was donated by his son, John Batty, who was himself a medallist with Blockhouse Bay in 1970.

The winner of the Jack Batty Memorial Cup for 1985 was Greg Brown of Napier City Rovers.

== Results ==
=== Third round ===
Blockhouse Bay	2 – 3	Waitemata City

Burndale United	0 – 0*	New Brighton

Rangers (Christchurch)	4 – 1	Shamrock (Christchurch)

Claudelands Rovers	4 – 2	Kelston West

Clendon United	0 – 3	East Coast Bays

Gisborne Thistle	5 – 0	Napier Technical

Glenfield Rovers	1 – 2	Lynndale

Hamilton	1 – 0	Otara Rangers

Mosgiel	2 – 2*	Dunedin Technical

Mount Maunganui	0 – 1	Howick

Naenae	0 – 6	Petone

Palmerston North End	1 – 6	North Wellington

Papakura City	2 – 1	Ellerslie

Queens Park (Invercargill)	3 – 1	Invercargill Thistle

Raumati Hearts	0 – 4	Waterside (Wellington)

Rose City	2 – 1	Wanganui East Athletic

Roslyn-Wakari	5 – 0	Oamaru

Stop Out (Lower Hutt)	2 – 1	Masterton

Tawa	1 – 1*	Karori Swifts

Woolston WMC	0 – 1	Nomads United (Christchurch)

* Won on penalties by New Brighton (3–2), Mosgiel (4–3), and Karori Swifts (4–3)

=== Fourth round ===
Rangers	3 – 1	Nomads United

Christchurch United	4 – 0	New Brighton

Dunedin City	3 – 1	Queens Park

Gisborne Thistle	1 – 2	Napier City Rovers

Howick	6 – 0	Waitemata City

Karori Swifts	2 – 4	Wellington Diamond United

Lynndale	0 – 2	Manurewa

Mount Wellington	2 – 0	University

North Wellington	1 – 2	Miramar Rangers

North Shore United	2 – 1	East Coast Bays

Papakura City	0 – 1	Hamilton

Papatoetoe	2 – 1	Claudelands Rovers

Petone	1 – 0	Gisborne City

Roslyn-Wakari	2 – 3	Mosgiel

Stop Out	2 – 1	Rose City

Waterside	2 – 5	Nelson United

=== Fifth round ===
Rangers	3 – 2 (aet)	Mosgiel

Dunedin City	1 – 1 (aet)*	Christchurch United

Howick	1 – 2	Mount Wellington

Manurewa	1 – 3 (aet)	Papatoetoe

Napier City Rovers	4 – 1	Stop Out

Nelson United	3 – 1	Miramar Rangers

North Shore United	2 – 1	Hamilton

Wellington Diamond United	5 – 1	Petone

* Won on penalties by Christchurch United (3–2)

=== Quarter-finals ===
Rangers	0 – 2	Christchurch United

Napier City Rovers	3 – 2	Mount Wellington

Nelson United	1 – 2	Wellington Diamond United

Papatoetoe	2 – 4 (aet)	North Shore United

=== Semi-finals ===
Napier City Rovers	1 – 0	Christchurch United

North Shore United	3 – 1	Wellington Diamond United

=== Final ===
7 September 1985

Napier City Rovers	3 – 1	North Shore United
Clarke, Halford, Brown		Weymouth

Mount Smart Stadium, Auckland
Referee: B. Tasker
