= Jarosław Nowicki =

Polish footballer (born 1961)

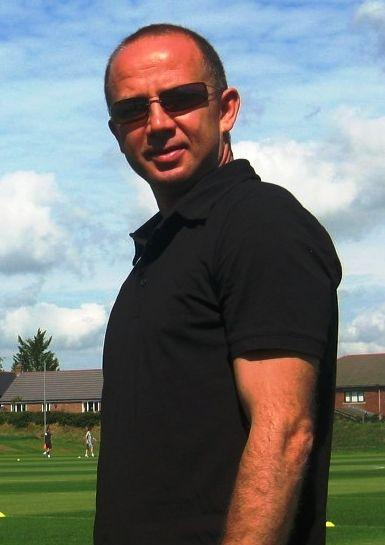

Personal information
- Date of birth: 11 January 1961 (age 65)
- Place of birth: Warsaw, Poland
- Height: 1.81 m (5 ft 11 1/2 in)
- Position: Winger

Senior career*
Years	Team	Apps	(Gls)
1974–1982	Zawisza Bydgoszcz		
1982–1983	ŁKS Łódź	39	(0)
1983–1985	Jagiellonia Białystok		
1985–1989	Lechia Gdańsk		
1989–1990	Polonia Sydney		
1990–1992	Parramatta Eagles	40	(2)
1992–1993	Wollongong Macedonia	34	(8)

International career
1981	Poland	4	(1)
- * Club domestic league appearances and goals

Jarosław Nowicki (born 11 January 1961) is a Polish former professional footballer who played as a winger.

He began his career in Zawisza Bydgoszcz and later played in Poland for ŁKS, Jagiellonia and Lechia. He won the NSL Cup in 1991 with Parramatta Eagles.

He represented Poland at 1978 UEFA European Under-18 Football Championship and 1979 FIFA World Youth Championship. He played four times for senior national team, scoring his only goal against Japan on 25 January 1981.

Since 2006, he has been working for International Management Group as a football agent. In 2010, he co-founded the football management agency Sport Trade Center.

== Honours ==
Parramatta Eagles

- NSL Cup: 1990–91
