= Arncliffe Market Gardens =

- Location within New South Wales Location within Australia
- 33.9462°S 151.1515°E
- Location: 212 West Botany Street, Banksia, Bayside Council, New South Wales, Australia

History
- Built: 1892–1930

Site notes
- Architect: N/A
- Owner: Department of Planning and Infrastructure

New South Wales Heritage Register
- Official name: Arncliffe Market Gardens; West Botany Street Market Gardens; Rockdale Market Gardens; Chinese Market Gardens
- Type: state heritage (landscape)
- Designated: 2 April 1999
- Reference no.: 1395
- Type: Market Garden
- Category: Farming and Grazing
- Builders: Sun Kuong-War

Arncliffe Market Gardens is a heritage-listed market garden at 212 West Botany Street, Banksia, New South Wales, a suburb of Sydney, Australia. It was established from 1892 by Sun Kuong-War. It is also known as West Botany Street Market Gardens, Rockdale Market Gardens and Chinese Market Gardens. It was added to the New South Wales State Heritage Register on 2 April 1999.

== History ==
The site demonstrates prolonged and continuous use as a market garden. The site was first occupied as market gardens in 1892 by Sung Kuong War, Lee How and Sin Hop Sing. A 1930 aerial photograph shows the site still occupied as a market garden. Market gardens such as this played an important role in food production for the local and regional community, particularly during the Great Depression and Post and Inter-War periods. For much of the Great Depression, Chinese market gardens were the only source of vegetables for urban dwelling Australians.

== Description ==
A remnant market garden with associated asbestos cement building. The building sits on brick piers and has a hipped corrugated iron roof. The associated corrugated iron sheds are in a dilapidated state. The garden is divided into small strips, each of which has a different type of produce under cultivation.

As at 19 January 1999, the site consists of a market garden, under production, and an associated fibro building, in poor condition. The site has some archaeological potential associated with its use as a market garden.

In the context of an area which has been under cultivation for a century, the landscape appears to be intact. The associated buildings also appear to be intact but are generally dilapidated and structurally unsound.

== Heritage listing ==
The Arncliffe Chinese Market Gardens are of high significance for their association with the Chinese community and their demonstration of a continuous pattern of land usage since the late nineteenth century. They are one of only three such surviving market gardens in the Inner Sydney region and one of few similar surviving examples in the Sydney Metropolitan Region.

Arncliffe Market Gardens was listed on the New South Wales State Heritage Register on 2 April 1999 having satisfied the following criteria.

The place is important in demonstrating the course, or pattern, of cultural or natural history in New South Wales.

The Arncliffe Market Gardens are of historical significance for their demonstration of a continuous pattern of land use since the late nineteenth century. They are also of significance for their association with the development of local industry and for their association with early Chinese immigration and the influence of ethnic communities on local industry.

The place is important in demonstrating aesthetic characteristics and/or a high degree of creative or technical achievement in New South Wales.

The Arncliffe Market gardens are of aesthetic significance as an important area of productive open space, providing visual variety from the other types of open space in the area.

The place has strong or special association with a particular community or cultural group in New South Wales for social, cultural or spiritual reasons.

The Arncliffe Market Gardens are of high social significance for their association with early ethnic communities, especially Chinese, and for the role they have played in helping to feed the local and regional population, particularly during the Inter-War, Depression and Post-War periods.

The place has potential to yield information that will contribute to an understanding of the cultural or natural history of New South Wales.

The Arncliffe Market Gardens have some technical/research significance for demonstrating early market gardening practices, particularly through the extant structure on the site relating to previous uses and remnant gardening equipment.

The place possesses uncommon, rare or endangered aspects of the cultural or natural history of New South Wales.

Market gardens such as this are becoming increasingly rare and the Arncliffe Market Gardens are of particular importance for their demonstration of a continuing pattern of usage from the late nineteenth century through to the 1930s.

The place is important in demonstrating the principal characteristics of a class of cultural or natural places/environments in New South Wales.

Whilst there are market gardens elsewhere in the metropolitan region, there are few that have been used continually as these have.
