= 1990–91 NSL Cup =

National Soccer League Cup

Tournament details
- Country: Australia
- Dates: 21 November 1990 – 7 April 1991
- Teams: 14

Final positions
- Champions: Melita Eagles (1st title)
- Runners-up: Preston Makedonia

Tournament statistics
- Matches played: 13
- Goals scored: 29 (2.23 per match)
- Attendance: 37,506 (2,885 per match)
- Top goal scorer: Greg Brown (3)

The 1990–91 NSL Cup was the 15th edition of the NSL Cup, which was the main national association football knockout cup competition in Australia.

South Melbourne were the defending champions, having defeated Sydney Olympic to win their first title in the previous year's final, but they were eliminated in the semi-finals by eventual winners Melita Eagles.

Melita Eagles defeated Preston Makedonia 1–0 in the final to win their first NSL Cup title.

== Teams ==
The NSL Cup was a knockout competition with 14 teams taking part all trying to reach the Final in April 1991. The competition consisted of the 14 teams from the National Soccer League.

Round	Main date	Number of fixtures	Clubs remaining
First round	Wednesday 21 November 1990	6	14 → 8
Second round	Wednesday 5 December 1990	4	8 → 4
Semi-finals	Wednesday 13 February 1991	2	4 → 2
Final	Sunday 7 April 1991	1	2 → 1

== First round ==
Melita Eagles and Preston Makedonia had a bye for the First round.

21 November 1990	Melbourne Croatia	0–1	Sunshine George Cross	Melbourne
18:00 AEDT		Report	C. Foster 68'	Stadium: Olympic Park; Attendance: 5,569; Referee: Chris Bambridge

21 November 1990	Heidelberg United	0–2	South Melbourne	Melbourne
20:00 AEDT		Report	Tasios 12'; Petersen 28' (pen.)	Stadium: Olympic Park; Attendance: 5,569; Referee: John Santa Isabel

21 November 1990	APIA Leichhardt	2–1	Sydney Olympic	Sydney
19:30 AEDT	Lemezina 35'; McFadden 59'	Report	Ironside 4'	Stadium: St George Stadium; Attendance: 1,750; Referee: Richard Lorenc

21 November 1990	Marconi Fairfield	1–0	Sydney Croatia	Sydney
19:30 AEDT	Nastevski 58'	Report		Stadium: Marconi Stadium; Attendance: 1,443; Referee: Peter Spiers

21 November 1990	Wollongong City	1–0	Wollongong Macedonia	Wollongong
19:30 AEDT	Oldridge 56'	Report		Stadium: Brandon Park; Attendance: 1,429; Referee: John McConnell

21 November 1990	Adelaide City	2–0	St George-Budapest	Adelaide
20:00 ACDT	Melta 18' (pen.); Mullen 38'	Report		Stadium: Hindmarsh Stadium; Attendance: 1,729; Referee: Mike Ingham

== Second round ==
5 December 1990	APIA Leichhardt	3–2	Wollongong City	Sydney
19:30 AEDT	Bundalo 18' (pen.); Maloney 74'; Lemezina 90'	Report	Cahut 15'; Blagojevic 33' (o.g.)	Stadium: St George Stadium; Attendance: 525; Referee: Alex Spiroski

5 December 1990	Melita Eagles	2–1	Adelaide City	Sydney
19:30 AEDT	Gunning 47'; Brown 69'	Report	A. Vidmar 14' (pen.)	Stadium: Melita Stadium; Attendance: 830; Referee: Peter Spiers

5 December 1990	South Melbourne	2–0	Sunshine George Cross	Melbourne
20:00 AEDT	Michalakopoulos 56'; Healy 69'	Report		Stadium: Olympic Park; Attendance: 2,913; Referee: John Santa Isabel

12 December 1990	Marconi Fairfield	0–1	Preston Makedonia	Sydney
19:30 AEDT		Report	R. Markovac 42'	Stadium: Marconi Stadium; Referee: John McConnell

== Semi-finals ==
13 February 1991	Preston Makedonia	2–1 (a.e.t.)	APIA Leichhardt	Melbourne
	Spink 66'; Trajanovski 115'	Report	Clinch 45'	Stadium: Olympic Park; Attendance: 4,500; Referee: Dennis Voutsinas

13 February 1991	South Melbourne	1–3	Melita Eagles	Melbourne
	Boutsianis 83'	Report	Nowicki 44'; Genc 47'; Brown 52'	Stadium: Olympic Park; Attendance: 4,500; Referee: Tom McRoe

== Final ==
7 April 1991

Melita Eagles	1–0	Preston Makedonia
Brown 89'	Report

Marconi Stadium, Sydney
Attendance: 6,749
Referee: Tom McRoe
