= Paul McFadden (footballer) =

Scottish footballer

Personal information
- Date of birth: 14 September 1965 (age 61)
- Place of birth: Glasgow, Scotland
- Position: Midfielder

Youth career
- –1983: Duntocher

Senior career*
Years	Team	Apps	(Gls)
1983–1986	Motherwell	23	(4)
- Melita Eagles
1989	Sutherland Sharks		
1989–1990	Wollongong City	23	(3)
1990–1992	A.P.I.A. Leichhardt	34	(0)
1992–1994	Wollongong City	47	(3)
- * Club domestic league appearances and goals

Paul McFadden (born 14 September 1965) is a Scottish retired professional footballer. Active in both Scotland and Australia, McFadden played as a midfielder.

== Career ==
Born in Glasgow, McFadden began his career in the youth team of Duntocher. He played in Scotland for Motherwell, making 23 league appearances between 1983 and 1986. He later played in Australia for Melita Eagles, Sutherland Sharks, Wollongong City and A.P.I.A. Leichhardt Tigers.
