= Zoran Ilic =

Soccer player (born 1969)

Zoran Ilić
Personal information
- Date of birth: 1 September 1969 (age 57)
- Height: 1.77 m (5 ft 10 in)
- Position: Striker

Youth career
- Pagewood Botany FC
- Sydney City
- St George

Senior career*
Years	Team	Apps	(Gls)
1987–1991	St George	95	(12)
1991–1992	Adelaide City	21	(0)
1993	Canterbury-Marrickville	5	(1)
1993–1995	Jagodina		
1995–1997	Canterbury-Marrickville		
1998	Leichhardt Tigers	3	(0)
1999–2000	Canterbury-Marrickville	29	(8)
2000	Stanmore Hawks		
2004	Hurstville City Minotaurs	7	(0)
2006	Shoalhaven Suns		

International career
1989	Australia U20	28	(18)
1992	Australia U23	11	(4)

Managerial career
- 2001–2002: Canterbury Marrickville U19
- 2002–2003: St George U19
- 2004–2005: St George U19
- * Club domestic league appearances and goals

Zoran Ilic (born 1 September 1969) is a former soccer manager and National Soccer League player. Ilic played as a forward in Australia and Serbia making his professional National Soccer League debut at 17 years of age and representing Australia at youth and senior level. Born in Serbia, he represented Australia at youth level.

== Club career ==
In Australia Ilic played as an attacking forward with St George where he won the 1987 National Soccer League Grand Final and was awarded the 1987 National Soccer League Player of the year. In the 1987 National Soccer League Youth League Ilic finished with 27 goals from 20 games and was awarded the National Soccer League Youth League Golden Boot and St George Youth League Player of the year. As a member of the 1991–92 Adelaide City National Soccer League team Ilic won the domestic double winning the 1991–92 National Soccer League title and National Soccer League Cup. Between 1993 and 1995 Ilic had a spell with FK Jagodina in FR Yugoslavia. Ilic continued his playing career for close to a decade in the National Premier Leagues NSW predominantly with Canterbury-Marrickville until his retirement in 2006.

== International career ==
Ilic represented Australia at Australia under-20 national team level and won the Golden Boot award at the 1988 OFC U-20 Championship in Fiji. He also played for the Australia U20 at the qualifiers for the 1989 FIFA World Youth Championship. Ilic represented the Australia U23 in the qualifiers for the 1992 Summer Olympics. Ilic also represented the Socceroos in a B International versus Czechoslovakia in 1991 scoring two goals for the Green and Gold at Lambert Park.

== Personal life ==
Since 1994 Ilic has been married to Lidija Ilic, a former Serbian Youth basketball player with ŽKK Jagodina 2001. They have two sons Stevan and David Ilic.
