= Allan Gilgrist =

New Zealand footballer

Personal information
- Full name: Allan D Gilgrist
- Place of birth: New Zealand
- Position: Goalkeeper

Senior career*
Years	Team	Apps	(Gls)
- North Shore United

International career
1986	New Zealand	1	(0)
- * Club domestic league appearances and goals

Allan David Gilgrist was born on October 26, 1957 in England, to the late Jean Gilgrist and Harry Gilgrist. He was a former association football goalkeeper, who represented New Zealand at the international level.

Gilgrist made a solitary official international appearance for New Zealand in a 4–2 win over Fiji on 17 September 1986.

Allan died on 8 August 2023, aged 65 years, and father to Tania Wojtowicz (nee Gilgrist).
