= Gary Hasler =

Australian soccer player

Personal information
- Full name: Gary Hasler
- Date of birth: 5 May 1970 (age 56)
- Place of birth: Australia
- Position: Midfielder

Senior career*
Years	Team	Apps	(Gls)
1988–1991	Sunshine George Cross	49	(7)
1991–1996	South Melbourne	71	(1)
1996–1998	Heidelberg United	64	(5)
1999	Westvale Melbourne	17	(0)

International career^{‡}
- Australia U23
1992	Australia	2	(0)
- * Club domestic league appearances and goals ‡ National team caps and goals as of 14 July 2011

Gary Hasler (born 5 May 1970 ) is an Australian former association football player. He played in the National Soccer League for Sunshine George Cross and South Melbourne. In international football, he made two appearances for Australia and also represented the country at the 1992 Olympics.

== Playing career ==
=== Club career ===
Hasler joined Sunshine George Cross in the National Soccer League in 1989.

In 1992, he joined South Melbourne. After two seasons he moved to Heidelberg in the Victorian Premier League.

=== International career ===
Hasler was a member of the Australian squad at the 1992 Barcelona Olympics.

In September 1992 he played twice for Australia in full internationals. His debut for Australia was against Tahiti in Papeete. His second and final match was against Solomon Islands later in the same month.
