= City Vista Recreation Reserve =

Soccer stadium in Plumpton, Melbourne, Australia

- Interactive map of City Vista Recreation Reserve
- Location: 46 City Vista Ct, Fraser Rise, 3336; Australia
- Coordinates: 37.7171°S 144.7267°E
- Owner: Melton City Council; Department of Education
- Capacity: 3,000
- Record attendance: 2,753 (Western United Women vs Melbourne Victory Women, 19 November 2022)

Construction
- Opened: 2019
- Cost: $13 million

Tenants
- Caroline Springs George Cross (2019–present); Western United Youth (2022–2024); Western United (women) (2022–2024)

The City Vista Recreation Reserve is a soccer stadium in Fraser Rise, Melbourne, Australia. It has been the home stadium of Caroline Springs George Cross Football Club since its opening in 2019 and was the temporary base of Western United Women from 2022 to 2024, as well as the men's and women's training base. It has a current seated capacity of 3,000.

== History ==
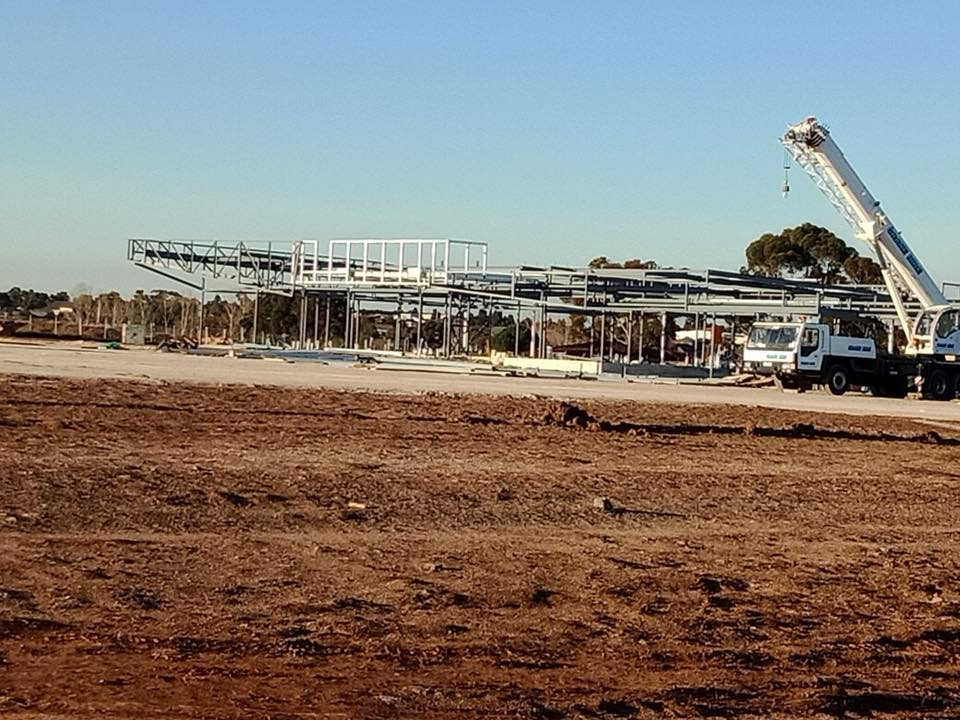
Development of the Fraser Rise Sporting Complex

The venue was opened in mid-2019 for $13,000,000 as an improvement of local capacity at a higher level of the club of Caroline Springs George Cross and to encourage local residents for participation and action of sports/recreational activities at the venue. Western United used the venue as their training grounds for the first two seasons of their existence and played their first match against tenants Caroline Springs George Cross in front of 3,247 spectators on 22 August 2019. The A-League Women's side of Western United announced they would use the venue for training and home matches as well on 16 September 2022.

== Structure and facilities ==
The stadium features two synthetic fields and an extra grass field; the main field accommodating 3,000 spectators which includes a grandstand of seats and an extra grass field.

== Records ==
The highest attendance recorded at the City Vista is 2,753, for Western United (women)'s first A-League Women fixture against Melbourne Victory on 19 November 2022. The lowest attendance recorded is 361 for an A-League Women match between Western United and Western Sydney Wanderers on 1 April 2023.
