= Adem Poric =

Soccer player (born 1973)

Personal information
- Date of birth: 22 April 1973 (age 53)
- Place of birth: London, England
- Position: Midfielder

Team information
- Current team: Gold Coast Knights SC (CEO / Head coach)

Senior career*
Years	Team	Apps	(Gls)
1989–1993	St George Saints	?	(?)
1993–1998	Sheffield Wednesday	13	(0)
1997	→ Southend United (loan)	7	(0)
1998	→ Rotherham United (loan)	4	(0)
1998	Notts County	5	(0)
1998–1999	Sydney Olympic	6	(1)
1999	Northern Spirit FC	2	(0)
2000–2002	City of Gold Coast	?	(?)

International career
1990	Australia U20	2	(0)

Managerial career
- 2021–: Gold Coast Knights SC
- * Club domestic league appearances and goals

Adem Poric (born 22 April 1973) is an English football coach and former professional player who is the chief executive and the head coach of Gold Coast Knights SC, as well as the president of youth academy side Magic United.

As a player, he was a midfielder from 1992 to 2002 and most notably played in the Premier League for Sheffield Wednesday. He also spent time in England playing in the Football League with Southend United, Rotherham United and Notts County as well as Australian sides St George Saints, Sydney Olympic, Northern Spirit FC and City of Gold Coast. Born in England, he was capped twice by Australia U20.

== Club career ==
During the 1991–92 season he had an unsuccessful trial at Arsenal, playing in three reserve team games. Sheffield Wednesday signed Poric for £60,000 from St George Saints on 1 October 1993. He found it difficult to break into the first team at Hillsborough and loan spells at Southend United and Rotherham United followed. He made just 13 league appearances in two seasons for the Owls, then a Premier League side, under Trevor Francis.

He eventually joined Notts County on a free transfer on 27 March 1998. He had not appeared in a competitive game for Sheffield Wednesday for almost three years by this stage, his last appearance coming as a substitute against Manchester United in a 1–0 defeat at Old Trafford in the league on 7 May 1995.

== International career ==
He represented Australia at youth level.

== Coaching career ==
Poric has returned to Australia where he is involved in running the Total Football Academy. The Academy has developed links to Sheffield Wednesday with the first of an anticipated influx of academy players coming to Hillsborough in September 2008.

He is the president of Magic United.

== Personal life ==
Poric was born in London, England to Australian parents of Bosnian heritage.
