= Banksia, New South Wales =

Banksia
- Suburb
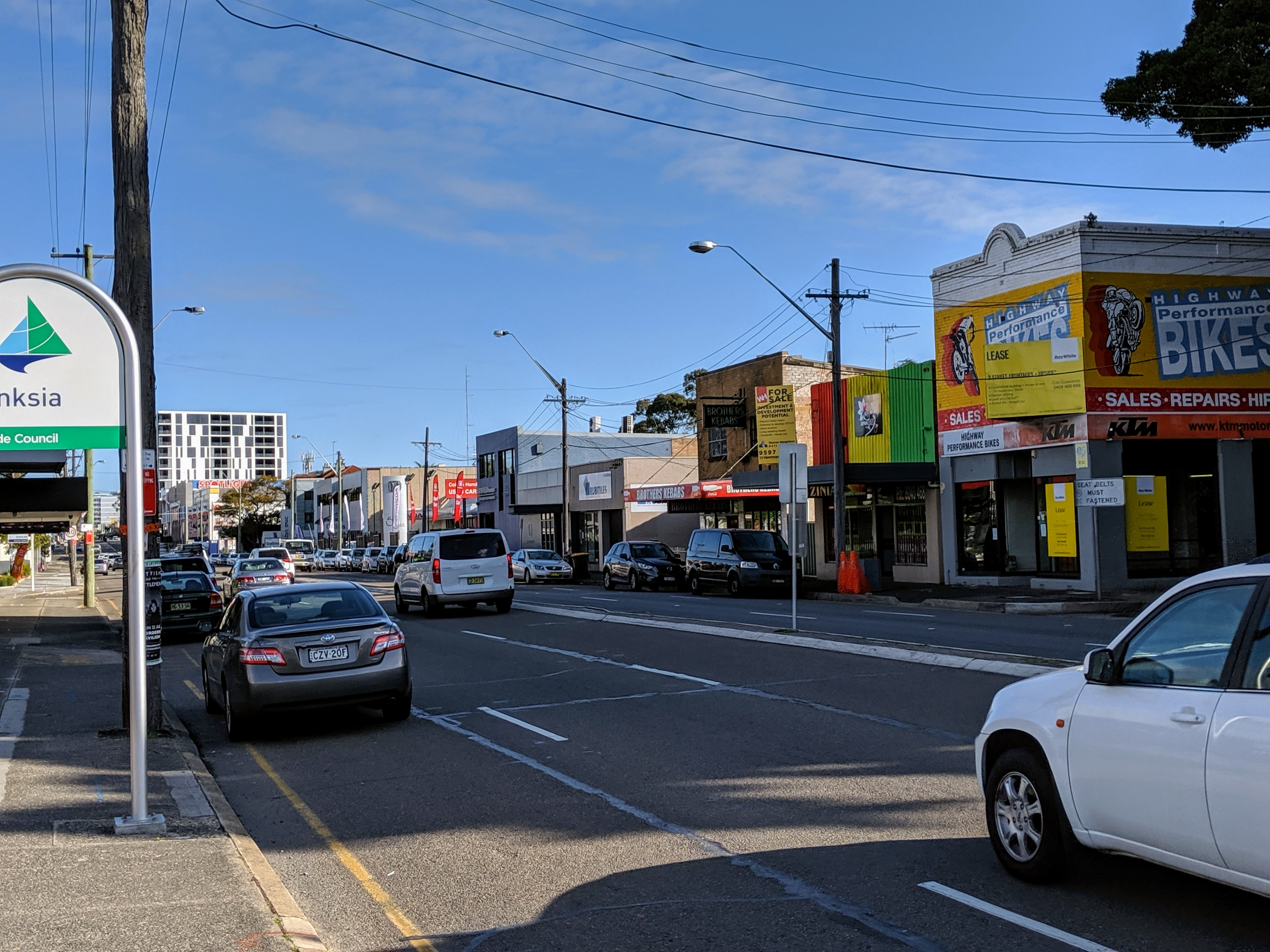
- Princes Highway at Banksia

- Interactive map of Banksia
- Country: Australia
- State: New South Wales
- City: Sydney
- LGA: Bayside Council
- Location: 12 km (7.5 mi) south of Sydney CBD
- Established: 1906

Government
  - State electorate: Rockdale
  - Federal division: Barton
- Elevation: 18 m (59 ft)

Population
  - Total: 3,277 (2021 census)
- Postcode: 2216
Suburbs around Banksia
Bardwell Valley	Arncliffe	Arncliffe
Bexley	Banksia	Kyeemagh
Rockdale	Rockdale	Brighton-Le-Sands

Banksia is a suburb in southern Sydney, in the state of New South Wales, Australia. Banksia is located 12 kilometres south of the Sydney central business district, in the local government area of the Bayside Council and is part of the St George area.

== History ==
Banksia is named for Joseph Banks, a botanist on the Voyage of Discovery of James Cook which visited the nearby Botany Bay in 1770.

The suburb was part of land owned by Simeon Pearce (1821–86) and his brother James Pearce in the 1850s, which extended from Rockdale to Brighton-Le-Sands. Until the late nineteenth century, the area was heavily timbered but residential development began in the 1880s. One of the leading developers was Frederick Jamison Gibbes, a Member of Parliament, after whom Gibbes Street in the suburb is named. The area developed more rapidly after the railway station opened on 21 October 1906. Many names for the suburb were suggested but the final choice came from David George Stead, father of novelist Christina Stead. The post office opened in August 1924.

== Heritage listings ==
Banksia has a number of heritage-listed sites, including:

- 212 West Botany Street: Arncliffe Market Gardens

== Landmarks ==
- Banksia Hotel
- National Film and Sound Archive
- Rocksia Hotel
- St Savvas of Kalymnos Orthodox Church (formerly Banksia Free Church)

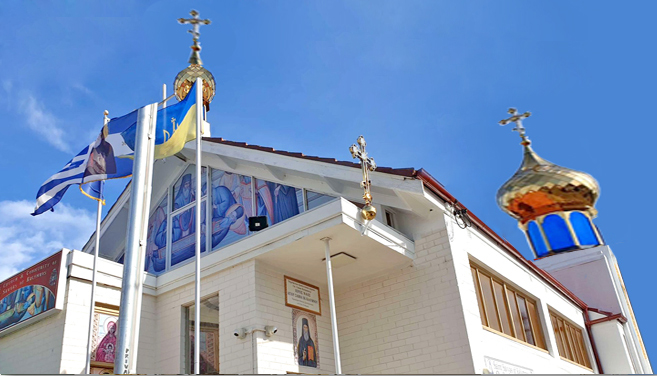
St Savvas of Kalymnos Orthodox Church Banksia (Formerly the Historical Banksia Free Church)

== Commercial area ==
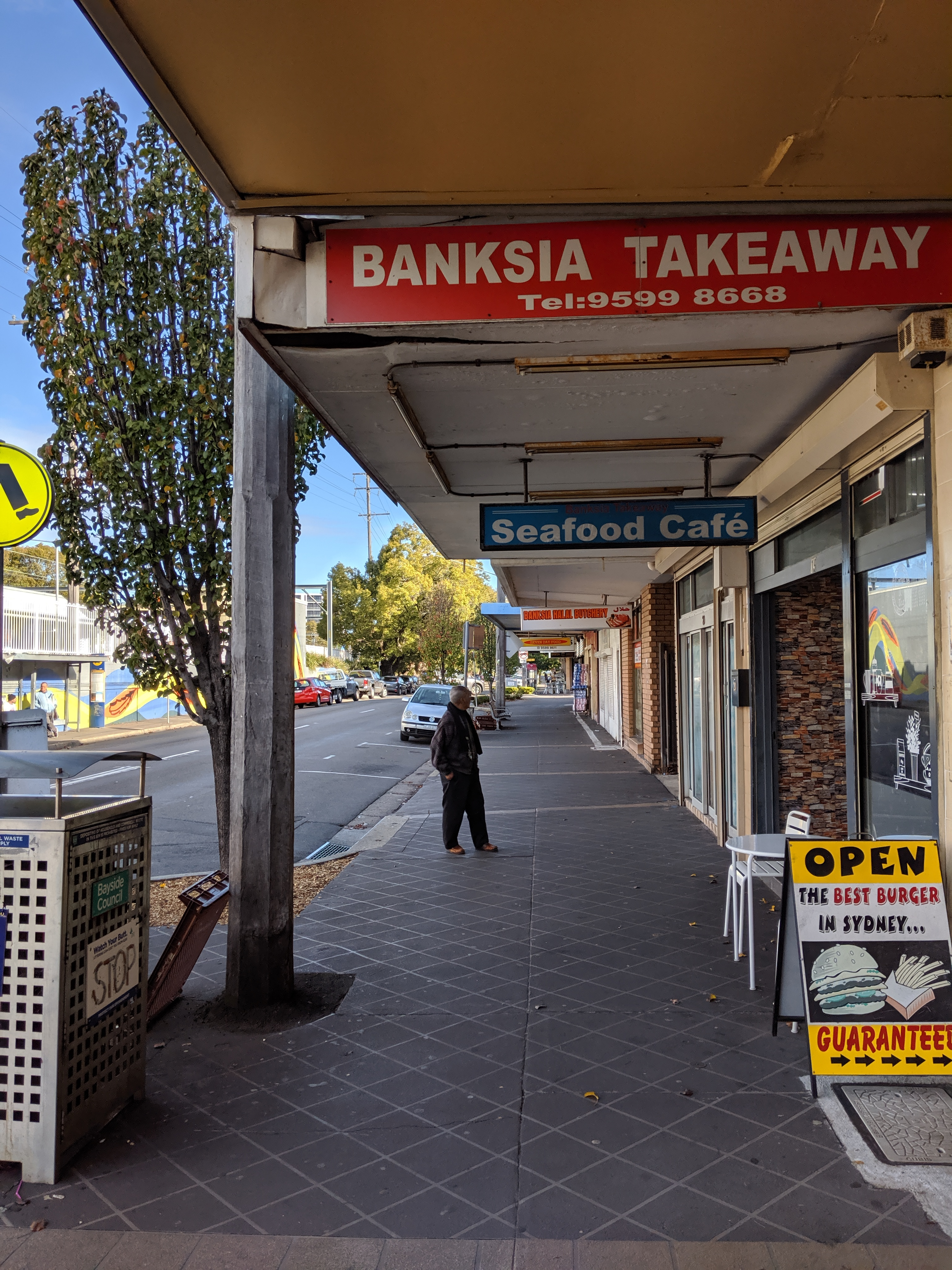
Shops on Railway Street

Banksia is mainly residential with a few commercial developments. It features mostly low density houses and some medium density blocks of flats. Banksia shopping centre consists of a small group of shops on Railway Street beside Banksia railway station. It includes Banksia Bakery, a take-away shop, a convenience store, chemist, Australia Post and a number of hairdressers.

More shops and commercial developments are located on the Princes Highway. This commercial area extends to the adjacent suburbs of Arncliffe and Rockdale. Many of the commercial developments are part of an automotive precinct featuring car yards, auto accessory retailers, tyre shops and auto repairers, other businesses include hotels and various take away food shops.

A market garden is located on the eastern side of West Botany Street, close to St George Soccer Stadium. Located next to St George Stadium on the grounds of Barton Park lies the Rockdale Ilinden Sports Centre, the former home grounds of the Rockdale Ilinden Football Club, a largely Macedonian supported NSWPL soccer club.

== Transport ==
Banksia railway station on the Eastern Suburbs & Illawarra Line of the Sydney Trains network. Banksia is also serviced by Transit Systems route 420 that runs between Westfield Burwood and Mascot station via Sydney Airport.

== Demographics ==
According to the 2021 census, there were 3,277 residents in Banksia. 52.5% of people were born in Australia. The next most common countries of birth were North Macedonia 6.5% and China 3.4%. 45.3% of people only spoke English at home. Other languages spoken at home included Macedonian 10.1%, Arabic 7.0%, Cantonese 4.9%, Greek 4.5% and Mandarin 2.7%. The most common responses for religion were No Religion 24.8%, Catholic 22.1% and Eastern Orthodox 15.7%.

== Houses ==
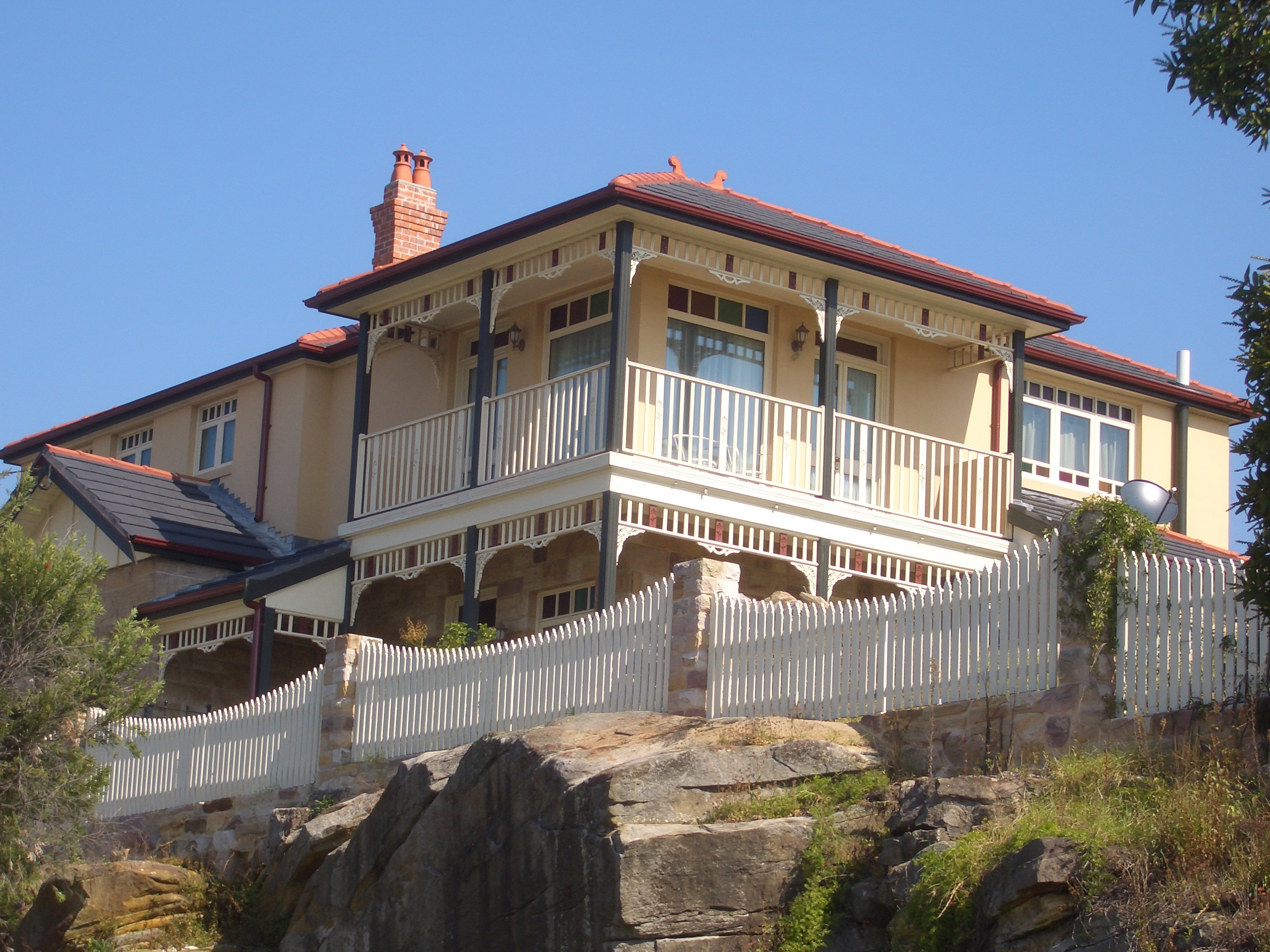
Bestic Street

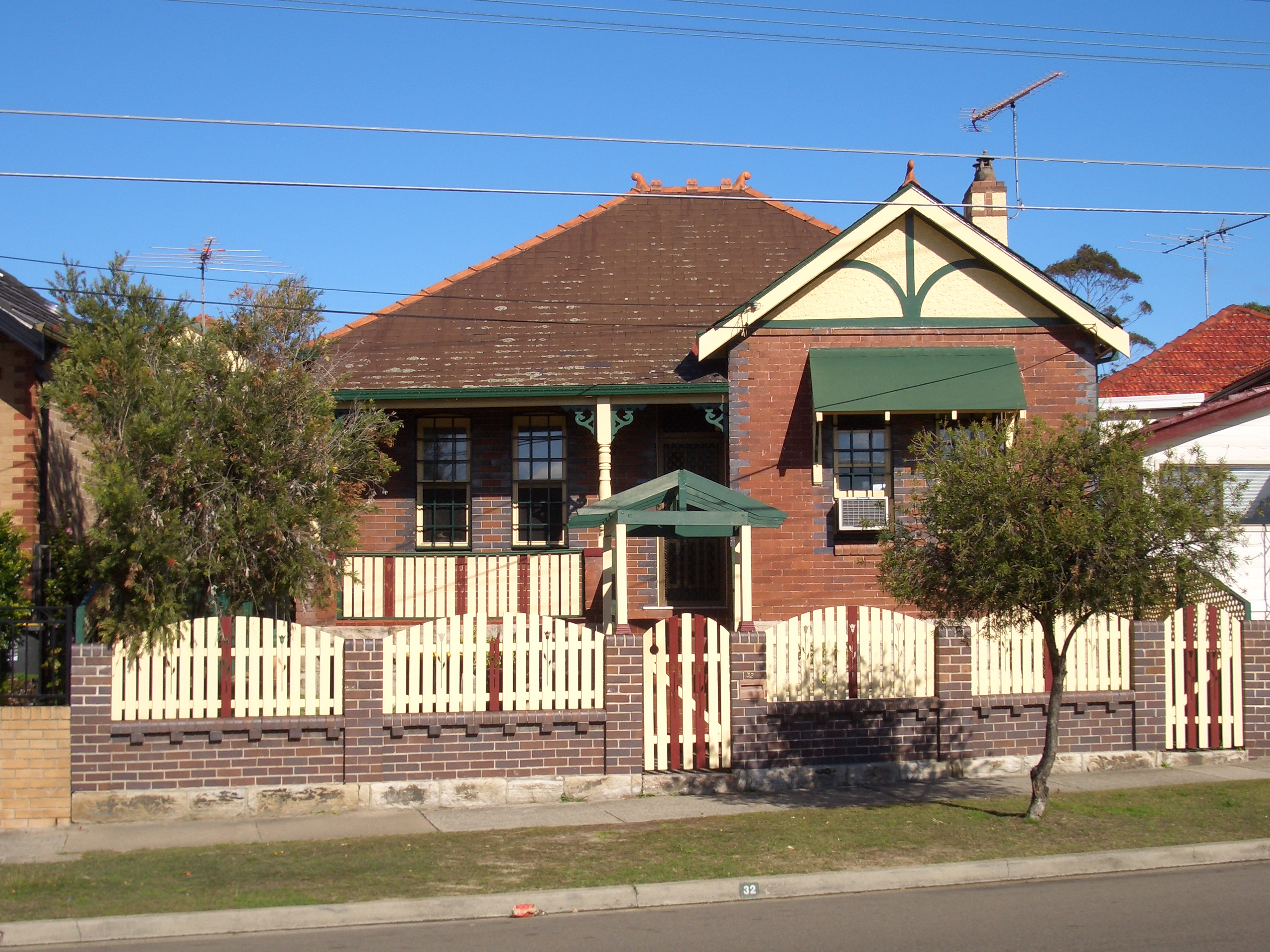
Kimpton Street

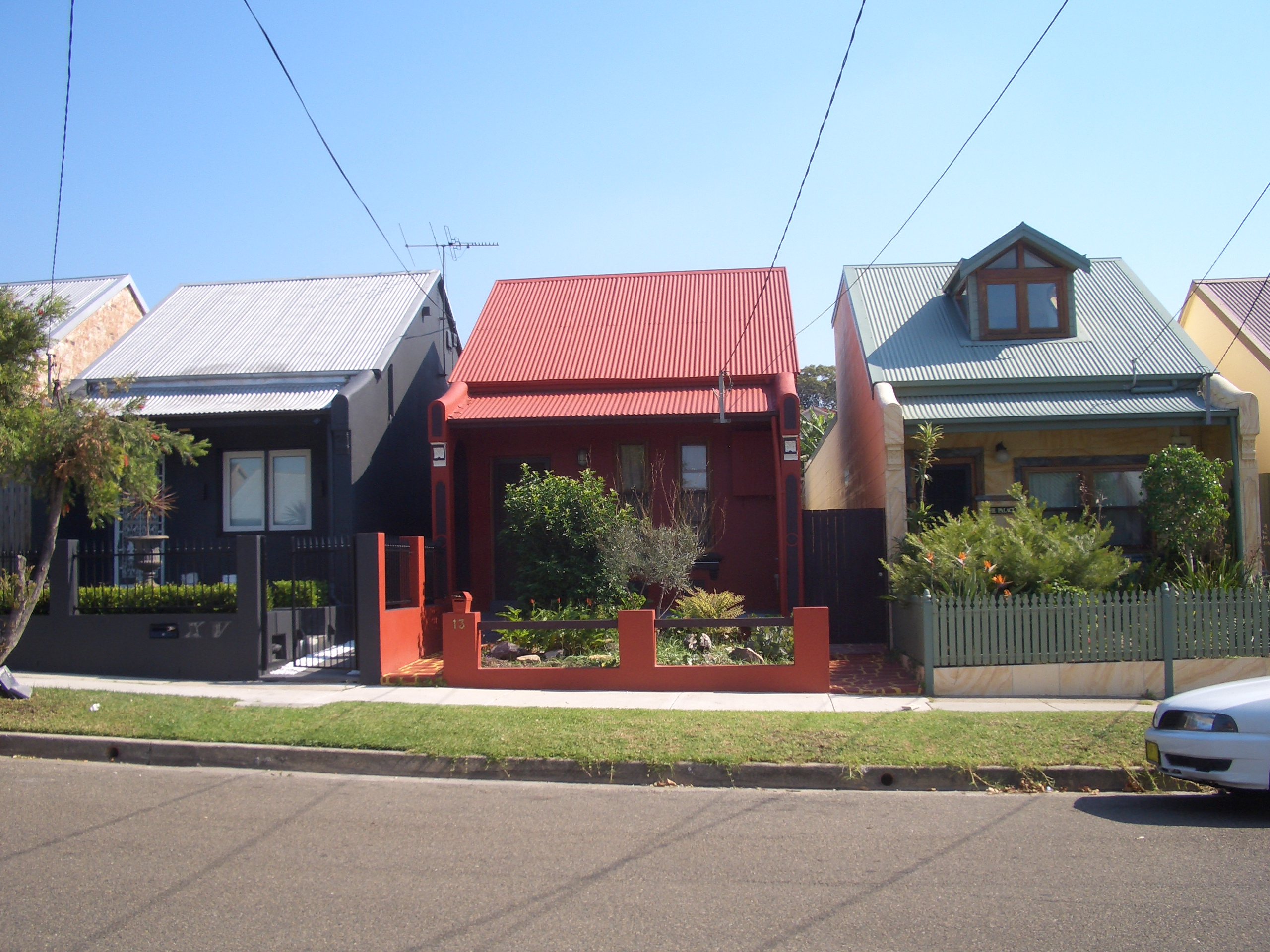
Gibbes Street

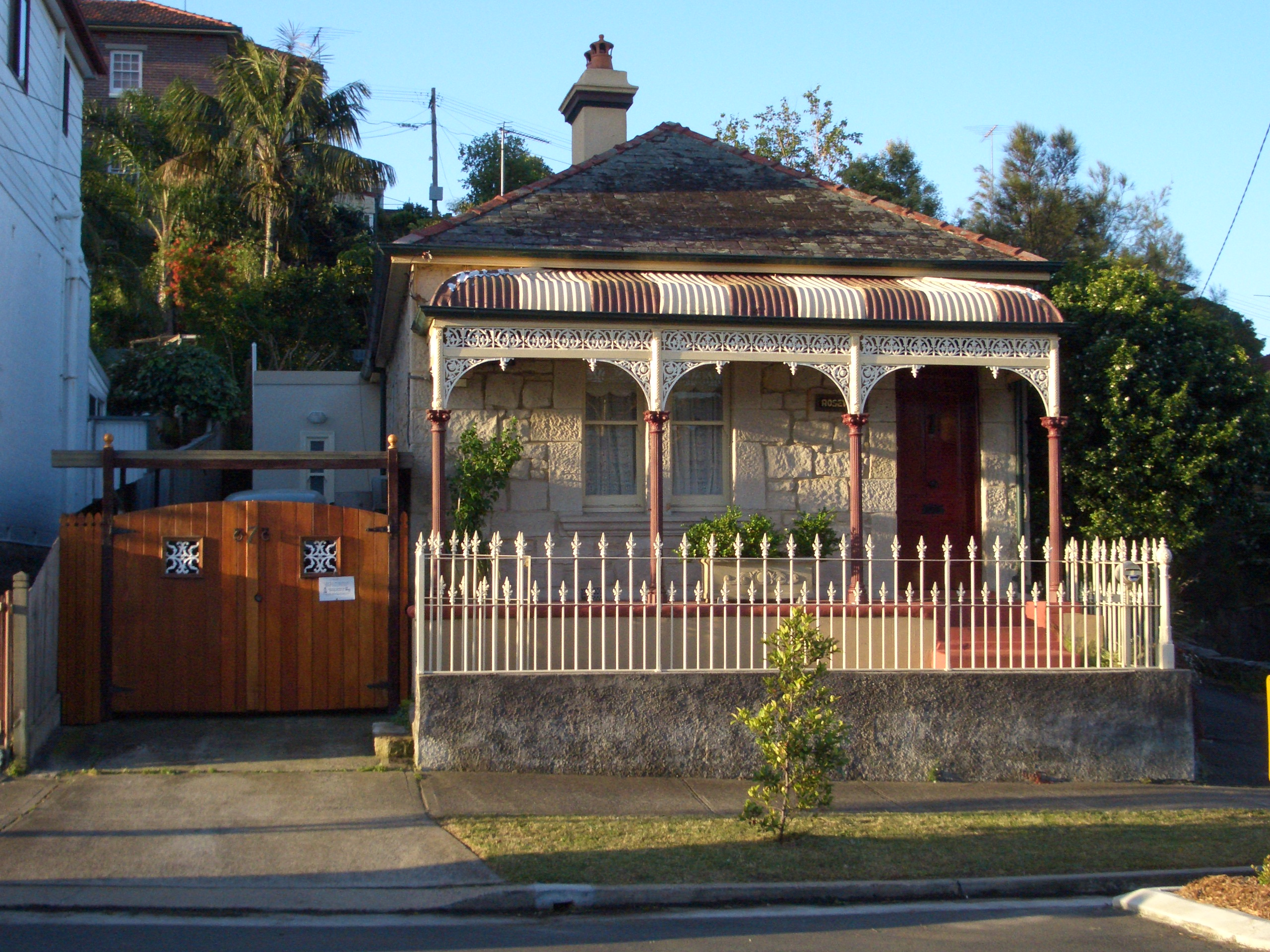
Sandstone cottage in Godfrey Street
