= Caroline Springs George Cross FC =

Australian football club

Caroline Springs George Cross
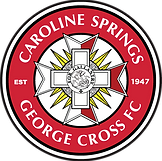
- Full name: Caroline Springs George Cross Football Club
- Nicknames: Georgies, George Cross
- Founded: 1947; 79 years ago
- Ground: City Vista Recreation Reserve, Fraser Rise, Victoria, Australia
- Capacity: 3,000
- Chairman: Mark Sultana
- Manager: Eric Vassiliadis
- League: NPL Victoria
- 2026: 7th of 14
- Website: www.georgecrossfc.com

Caroline Springs George Cross Football Club is an Australian soccer club based in Fraser Rise, a north-western suburb of Melbourne, Victoria, Australia, and plays in the National Premier Leagues Victoria, the first tier of football in Victoria, and second in Australia.

George Cross play at the City Vista Recreation Reserve, following a move from Chaplin Reserve, Sunshine in 2019, where the club spent 38 seasons. The move to Fraser Rise coincided with a name change for the club, from Sunshine George Cross to the current name. The club was founded by Maltese immigrants.

Having been one of eight Victorian clubs to have participated in Australia's National Soccer League, the club's best achievement was reaching the playoffs as finalists in the 1986 season. Winners of the Australian Cup in 1964, Sunshine George Cross were named champions of the 1977 Victorian State League and were also runners up on 9 occasions. Producing 5 Weinstein Medalists and three Bill Fleming Medalists throughout its history. The club was once home to John Markovski, Craig Foster, Kevin Muscat, Emmanuel Muscat and Andrew Nabbout.

Caroline Springs George Cross wear red and white stripes for their home colours, the colours on the Maltese flag.

Caroline Springs George Cross FC are one of just three winners of the 1960s Australia Cup that are still active, the others being Hakoah Sydney City East FC and APIA Leichhardt FC.

== History ==
=== George Cross Football Club ===
Maltese migrants Danny Gatt, Bill Sandham and Angelo Puli instigated the formation of a Maltese backed football team after the Second World War. The club was officially launched on 12 March 1947, and was called George Cross Football Club. The club first entered a team in 1948, when they joined the Third Division. The club's first home ground was Royal Park. They played their first match on Saturday 8 May 1948, beating Woodlands 2–0. They finished the season in second place.

The next year, the young club took out the championship and was promoted to Second Division. In 1954, the club won the Second Division and were promoted to the highest level, the First Division, despite being just seven years young. In 1958, the First Division was named the State League for the first time, with George Cross achieving their goal of surviving in the league. 1959 was a great year for the club, finishing runners up in the league, but taking out the Sun Cup, the State League Cup and the Dockerty Cup. The trophies were celebrated in front of our 1,000 people, with the number of supporters of the club rapidly growing. 1961 saw the club introduce Juniors for the first time. In 1962, the club won its second Dockerty Cup. In 1964, the club won the Australia Cup, beating A.PI.A from N.S.W. 3–2 in front of over 15,000 at Olympic Park. The following year George Cross won the Ampol Cup beating Hakoah 3–0 in front of 10,000 fans in South Melbourne.

In 1967 George Cross moved to a new home ground in Selwyn Park in Sunshine. The club stayed at Selwyn Park for just two seasons, moving back to Olympic Park, struggling to find a permanent home ground solution. During the 1960s, grounds like the Showgrounds, Heidelberg's Olympic Village, Shintler Reserve, Olympic Park's number one and number two grounds, Elsternwick Park, Maribyrnong, Selwyn Park, St. Kilda Cricket Ground and Optus Oval were just few grounds the George Cross Football Club has used as home grounds.

In 1968, long serving President Lou Debono retired, ending a 14-year spell as president. He was affectionately known as the father of George Cross.

Between in 1958 and 1976, the club finished runners up in the State League competition eight times – earnings themselves the title of perennial runners up. That all changed in 1977, though. In 1977, Mooroolbark, J.U.S.T., Heidelberg and Hellas joined the NSL. This made the club more determined than ever before to win the State League, which they did. They finished 7 points above Slavia in the 1977 season. In 1979 and 1980, financial trouble began to hit and the club managed just seventh and eighth-placed finishes in the league. Hiring Olympic Park was a burden on the club, with gate takings not being enough to cover rent. In 1980, the club made the decision to move back to Selwyn Park. A longer-term solution was finally found in 1980, when the Sunshine Council gave a long-term lease on Chaplin Reserve to George Cross.

In 1983, George Cross amalgamated with Sunshine City to become Sunshine George Cross.

=== National Soccer League years ===
Chart of yearly table positions for Sunshine George Cross in NSL

In 1984, the club made an application to join the newly expanded National Soccer League and was accepted. The club finished bottom, but as no other Victorian club wished to join the league, they retained their place. In 1985, the club finished sixth. In 1986, the team finished in fourth place, just 1 point behind first. The club was almost relegated in '87, but a heroic effort saw them climb to just 2 points above Heidelberg to retain their NSL status. During this decade, players like John Markovski, Chris Taylor, Andrew Marth, Paul Trimboli and Kevin Muscat donned the George Cross crest. During the 80's, George Cross were known as they Great Survivors due to their numerous close brushes with relegation.

In the 1989–90 NSL season, the first summer season, the Georgies played their first home game at their new ground in Skinner Reserve against the Ferenc Puskas-led South Melbourne Hellas team. The Georgies won 2–0 in front of over 6,000. A 15-year-old Kevin Muscat debuted in this season. In the 1990–91 season, the Georgies finished second last and had to reapply for a position in the NSL. This was denied.

=== Return to Victorian Football ===
The Georgies returned to the VPL for the 1992 season. Most of the squad left, and the club did quite well to finish in sixth position. In 1993, John Markovski returned as a guest player, scoring 18 goals as the club reached the preliminary final. In 1994, the Victorian Soccer Federation renamed the club Sunshine Georgies. In 1997, Sunshine George Cross bought Chaplin Reserve from the State Government. Club officials made it official by signing the deal at the club's 50th Anniversary Dinner Ball held at the Lakeside Banquet & Convention Centre on Saturday 28 June 1997. Saso Markovski scored a club record 25 goals that season. In 1998, the club tightened the budget and cut many senior players, replacing them with much younger ones. The club struggled and were relegated to the First Division. This was the first time George Cross had been relegated from the Premier League since 1958.

At the end of the 2000 season the club made the decision to go amateur. The club entered the 2001 season with what was practically the under 16 team from the previous season. Most of the supporters stopped attending matches, with only a handful, loyal supporters standing by the club. The club was at its lowest point in a long time and there were great fears the club would go bust. The team went all season without a win and were relegated. In 2002, a new committee took over with the goal of getting the Georgies out of this mess, consolidation and eventually back up into the First Division and above. The first win of 2002 came in round 13 when the Georgies won 2–1 at Croxton Park to end a run of 40 games without a win. The club managed to survive in the Second Division in 2002, and went about strengthening for 2003. The club went neck and neck with Pascoe Vale SC, just edging them to the 2003 Second Division championship. The team also won the State League Cup that year. It was the club's first cup win in 25 years. In 2004, the club shot up to the top of the First Division ladder, going neck and neck with Heidelberg United FC all season, who ended up winning the race by two points. The second-place finish meant promotion for the Georgies who, against all odds, returned to the Victorian Premier League.

The return to the VPL was always going to be tough, with the Georgies in a relegation dogfight from the offset. In the final round of the season, a point achieved from a 0–0 draw with Melbourne Knights FC was enough to ensure VPL football for another year. George Cross survived again in the 2006 season, but only on a technicality, as Essendon Royals were relegated for fielding an ineligible player. In 2007, the Football Federation of Victoria announced that four sides would be relegated from the VPL as the number of teams was being reduced. George Cross finished third bottom and were relegated. In 2008, an Andy O'Dell lead George Cross took out the State League 1 championship, edging Dandenong Thunder by three points. In 2009, the club finished in eighth place. In 2010, players began to leave halfway through the season and Andy O'Dell quit his position as head manager. Sunshine George Cross slipped from fifth to last place, following 9 successive defeats. It was close with the relegation issue was not being settled until the final day when the Georgies lost 4–0 to South Melbourne and Bentleigh Greens upset the league leaders Richmond to avoid the drop. The club played their home matches at Knights Stadium that year, which incurred high costs on the club. The club's previous name of Sunshine George Cross FC was restored after a long time being known as Sunshine Georgies.

In 2011, Sunshine George Cross finished in seventh position in the Victorian State League Division One. The following year, the club endured similar fortunes, finishing in eighth position. In 2013, the club's results improved and the Georgies just missed out on promotion, finishing in third place, three points off Werribee City.

=== National Premier Leagues Victoria ===
In 2014, after a restructuring of football in Victoria, Sunshine George Cross FC had their application for a place in the new National Premier Leagues Victoria accepted and were placed into National Premier Leagues Victoria Division One, effectively the second division of football in Victoria, the same tier they were in previously. The club finished in ninth position out of 14 teams in their first year in the NPL1.

In 2015, the NPL1 was split into East and West conferences after more sides were accepted into the NPL. George Cross was placed into NPL1 West. The club finished in eighth place in the 10 team West conference and 15th overall.

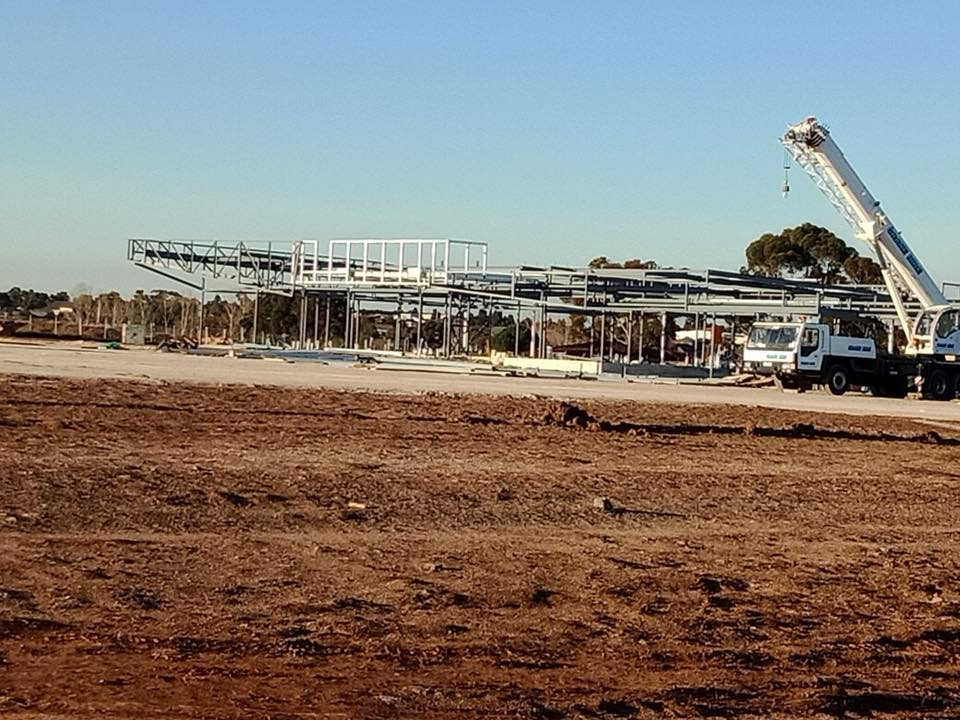
Development of the Fraser Rise Sporting Complex

On 4 June 2015, Jamie Chetcuti, the president of Sunshine George Cross, announced that following the sale of Chaplin Reserve, the club is "currently working with a municipality with the intent of developing a state of the art facility that George Cross juniors and senior’s players, staff and parents will call home". Chaplin Reserve will be converted into townhouses, while Georgies will move out to a new facility in Fraser Rise, which will become a home base for both the club's senior and junior sides.

Following a melee in a pre-season friendly in January 2016 against local rivals North Sunshine Eagles FC, George Cross were deducted 4 NPLV 2 West championship points and fined $1,000. Georgies finished the season in ninth place.

In 2017, George Cross had an improved season, finishing equal third in the 10-team NPL2 West.

Sunshine reached an agreement with Melbourne Knights FC to play out of Knights Stadium for 2018. After a 9–2 loss to Altona Magic SC and a 7–0 loss to St Albans Saints in the first four rounds of the 2018 season, long-serving head coach Tony Ciantar resigned and was replaced by Joe Kovacevic. Kovacevic resigned only a few weeks into his reign, with technical director Vaughan Coveny taking over until the end of the season. George Cross were relegated at the end of the 2018 season, finishing the season in bottom place. As a result of the senior side's relegation, the club's juniors were also relegated from the NPL competitions.

=== Move to Fraser Rise and new club name ===
For the 2019 season, coinciding with the move to Fraser Rise, the club changed its name to Caroline Springs George Cross FC. George Cross appointed Corey Smith as the new senior head coach. The squad went through a rebuild, with only a handful of the relegated 2018 squad remaining. Smith was relieved of his duties on 28 May 2019 after 2 wins, 2 draws and 5 losses, leaving George Cross in tenth place of the 12-team division. Former Port Melbourne player and coach Eric Vassiliadis was named as his replacement. George Cross played its first game at City Vista Recreation Reserve on the third pitch on 30 June 2019, defeating league-leading side Sydenham Park 1–0. The City Vista complex is a $13m facility, including two grass pitches, two synthetic pitches, clubrooms and a bistro. New A-League side Western United FC chose the complex as its inaugural home base. Western United's first official match as a club came against George Cross, winning 4–0 in front of 3,247 people at City Vista. Vassiliadis' appointment saw a significant upturn in form for George Cross, winning 8, drawing 1 and losing 2 of its last 11 games, propelling the club up to fifth position on the league table. After Vassiliadis appointment, he managed to bring in strong players including Andrezinho, Francesco Stella and Ethan Gage.

The 2020 season was suspended and subsequently cancelled due to the COVID-19 pandemic in Australia. The 2021 season was also cancelled after 14 matches being played, with George Cross in top spot, with 33 points from 14 games, 1 point clear of Brimbank Stallions FC. As a result of the season cancellation, there was no promotion or relegation in 2021.

On 14 August 2022, George Cross were promoted and confirmed as league champions of State League 1 North-West. The promotion saw Caroline Springs George Cross playing in NPL Victoria 3 for 2023.

On 29 July 2023, George Cross secured back-to-back promotions with three games to spare.

== Visit Malta partnership (2026) ==
In January 2026, Caroline Springs George Cross FC announced a four-year strategic marketing partnership with Visit Malta, the tourism brand of the Malta Tourism Authority. The agreement represented a significant development in the club's international commercial activities, strengthening its longstanding connections with Malta and promoting the country as a tourism destination within Australia.

The partnership followed engagement with the Malta Tourism Authority involving club president Mark Sultana and Head of Strategic Partnerships Adam Farrugia Borg. The two representatives met with Malta Tourism Authority chief executive Carlo Micallef ahead of the announcement, as part of the club's efforts to develop closer institutional and commercial relationships with Malta. Farrugia Borg's involvement formed part of his responsibilities for strategic partnerships and external relations at George Cross.

Under the agreement, Visit Malta became the club's principal jersey sponsor, with its branding appearing across 33 George Cross squads, including the senior men's National Premier League team. The partnership also incorporated digital advertising, match livestream exposure and promotional activities at the club's facilities.

The Malta Tourism Authority identified the partnership as an opportunity to strengthen Malta's visibility in the Australian tourism market. The agreement also reflected George Cross's continued engagement with its Maltese heritage and its development of international institutional relationships beyond Australian football.

== Rivalries ==
Rivalries of the club include Victorian former NSL clubs South Melbourne, Melbourne Knights, Green Gully, Heidelberg United and the Preston Lions. Other rivalries include Victorian club's that are based in Melbourne's west, such as St Albans Saints, Western Suburbs and Altona Magic.

== Affiliated clubs ==
Sunshine George Cross FC has a sister club relationship with Maltese-founded and Western Melbourne based club Green Gully Cavaliers. It is believed that both clubs adopted their familiar stripes from the Maltese club Floriana.

== Current squad ==
Updated 13 July 2025
Note: Flags indicate national team as defined under FIFA eligibility rules; some limited exceptions apply. Players may hold more than one non-FIFA nationality.

No.	Pos.	Nation	Player
1	GK	AUS	Aydin Sayan
2	DF	ENG	Jordan Tucker
3	DF	AUS	Lachlan Weier
4	DF	AUS	Michael Tzoutzidis
5	DF	WAL	Morgan Filer
6	MF	AUS	Tyler James
8	MF	AUS	Leo Athanasiou
9	FW	JPN	Riki Hosaio
10	MF	AUS	Lochie Reus
11	FW	ENG	Joshua Whiteley
12	FW	AUS	Callum Pickford

No.	Pos.	Nation	Player
14	MF	AUS	Jonathan Alveras
16	MF	RSA	Daniel Cuttler
17	DF	AUS	Matthew Sporle
18	MF	ENG	Luke Lofts
19	MF	AUS	Jaiden Diamantis
22	DF	RWA	Papi
23	DF	AUS	Ross Vassiliadis
27	MF	AUS	Otman Benhaddou
28	GK	AUS	Emmanuel Prifitti
29	FW	FRA	Saif Sakhi
31	DF	AUS	Josh Calabria

== Former players ==
For details of former players, see: Caroline Springs George Cross FC players.

== Honours ==
=== National ===
- Australian Cup Winners: 1964
- National Soccer League Finalists (Playoffs): 1986
- National Youth League Champions: 1989
- National Youth League Runner-Up: 1986, 1987, 1988
- National Youth League (Southern Division) Champions: 1986, 1987, 1988, 1989

=== State ===
- Victorian State League/ (NPL) Champions: 1977
- Victorian State League/ (NPL) Runners Up: 1959, 1960, 1961, 1964, 1965, 1972, 1973, 1974 and 1978
- State League Cup (Top 4 Series) Winners: 1959, 1973, 1977
- Victorian Premier League (VPL 1) Runners Up: 2025
- National Premier Leagues Victoria 3 (VPL 2) Champions: 2023
- Victorian State League Division 1 Champions: 2008, 2022
- Victorian State League Division 2 Champions: 1954, 1957, 2003
- Victorian State League Division 3 Champions: 1949, 1953
- Ampol Cup Winners: 1961, 1965, 1974
- Dockerty Cup Winners: 1959, 1962, 1978
- Federation Cup Winners: 2003
- Armstrong Cup Winners: 1976, 1994

=== Individual honours ===
- Bill Fleming Medal
- 1961 – Fred Falzon
- 1962 – Fred Falzon
- 1972 – John Gardiner
- Victorian Premier League Top Goalscorer Award
- 1977 – Ken Reed
- 1997 – Sasha Markovski
- Weinstein Medal
- 1986 – John Markovski
- 1988 – Lorenz Kindter
- 1990 – Kevin Muscat
- 1997 – Sasha Markovski
- 1998 – Anthony Magnacca
- National Youth Player of the Year
- 1989 – John Markovski
- State League First Division Player of the Year
- 2008 – George Papadopoulos

== International representatives ==
=== Australia ===
==== Socceroos ====
- (Australia) Craig Foster
- (Australia) Gary Hasler
- (Australia) Steve Horvat
- (Australia) Lorenz Kindtner
- (Australia) John Markovski
- (Australia) Andrew Marth
- (Australia) Damian Mori
- (Australia) Kevin Muscat
- (Australia) Ernie Tapai
- (Australia) Paul Trimboli

==== Australia U-23 ====
- (Australia) Kevin Muscat
- (Australia) Damian Mori

==== Australia U-20 ====
- (Australia) Kevin Muscat
- (Australia) Paul Trimboli
- (Australia) Lorenz Kindtner

==== Australia U-17 ====
- (Australia) Craig Foster
- (Australia) Paul Trimboli

==== England U-19 ====
- (England) Joe Ridley

=== Malta ===
==== Malta national football team ====
- (Malta) Emmanuel Muscat

=== Nepal ===
==== Nepal national football team ====
- (Nepal) Jagajeet Shrestha

== Notable coaches ==
- (Australia) (Scotland) John Gardiner
- (Australia) (Scotland) Ernie Merrick
- (Australia) John Markovski
- (England) Ken Wagstaff

== See also ==
Australian football (soccer) league system
