= Greg Brown (footballer, born 1962) =

New Zealand footballer

Personal information
- Date of birth: 29 July 1962 (age 64)
- Place of birth: Manchester, England
- Position: Forward

Youth career
- Manchester United
- Mather and Platt
- Stalybridge Celtic

Senior career*
Years	Team	Apps	(Gls)
1980–1982	Stalybridge Celtic		
1982–1983	Mather & Platt		
1983–1984	Mossley	16	(4)
1985	Hyde United	7	(2)
1984–1985	Southport	7	(2)
1985	Napier City Rovers	12	(9)
1986	Miramar Rangers	21	(15)
1987–1992	Melita-/Parramatta Eagles	69*	(33*)
1991	→ POSCO Atoms (loan)	2	(0)
1992	Avala	10	(7)
1992–1994	West Adelaide Sharks	51	(23)
1996–2003	Michelton		
- NSL only (1989–92)

International career^{‡}
1986	New Zealand	0	(0)
1991–92	Australia	12	(1)

Managerial career
- 1997–1999: Australia Women
- 2004–2007: Mitchelton FC
- * Club domestic league appearances and goals as of 19 June 2008 ‡ National team caps and goals as of 19 June 2008

Greg Brown (born 29 July 1962) is a former footballer who played as striker for both the New Zealand and Australian national football teams.

== Club career ==
Brown played semi-professionally for Mossley, Hyde United and Southport in the United Kingdom before being brought to New Zealand by Napier City Rovers midway through 1985.

Despite being sent off in his club debut, Brown's goalscoring touch immediately turned struggling Napier's season around leading them from the bottom of the New Zealand National Soccer League to 1985 Chatham Cup winners in a final that became known as "Greg Brown's final", in which he scored one goal and set up two others in the 3–1 win over North Shore United. He was named man of the match in the final.

However, with Brown injured, Napier failed to avoid relegation from the national league during the following week's promotion/relegation play-offs and Brown was pursued by several national league clubs, eventually moving to Miramar Rangers for the 1986 season. He was the national league's top scorer for the first half of the 1986 season but hit a dry spell due to injury during the second half.

In February 1986 he was selected in the New Zealand national football team, making four B-international appearances in friendlies against a touring USSR XI.

In 1987, Brown moved across the Tasman to play for the Parramatta Eagles from 1987 to 1992 and the West Adelaide Sharks from 1992 till his retirement from professional football in 1994, aged 32. He was named Australian football player of the year in 1990 and was picked in the Australian national team in 1991, going on to make 12 appearances and scoring one goal.

== Managerial career ==
Brown joined Mitchelton FC in the local Brisbane competition in 1996 and was the club's head coach from 2004 to 2007.

From November 1997 to March 1999, Brown was coach of the Matildas, the Australian national women's team, and took them to a record 14 internationals without a loss. He resigned from the position after the side's poor showing at the World Cup in the United States.
