= Parramatta FC =

- Full name: Parramatta Football Club
- Nicknames: Melita, Eagles, Whites
- Founded: 1956; 70 years ago
- Ground: Melita Stadium
- Capacity: 10,000
- Chairman: Steve Elriche
- General Manager: Issa Jebara
- League: NSW League Two
- 2026: 2nd of 15 (promoted via playoffs)
- Website: www.parramattafc.com.au
Home colours	Away colours

Parramatta Football Club, commonly known as Parramatta Melita Eagles or just Melita, are a semi-professional Australian soccer club based in South Granville, New South Wales. The club was established by Maltese migrants in 1956 and played several seasons in the National Soccer League, winning the NSL Cup twice. Later they were in the New South Wales Premier League, which the club won on six occasions. The club currently competes in the NSW League Two (formerly National Premier Leagues NSW 3).

== History ==
The club was formed in 1956 as Melita Eagles United Soccer Football Club by Maltese immigrants after the amalgamation of two Maltese clubs; Malta Eagles (Established 1952) and Melita Soccer Football Club (Established 1953). Prior to their amalgamation, these two clubs were the fiercest of rivals, competing in the Eastern Suburbs Soccer Football Association (ESSFA).

Melita Eagles have had a long and distinguished career in NSW soccer history. Their origins in the Maltese community stretch way back to the formation of the original NSW Federation of Soccer Clubs in 1957. Along with higher profile clubs like Prague, Hakoah, APIA Leichhardt, St George, Pan-Hellenic and others, it was part of the original breakaway movement which led to the end of the old NSW Soccer Football Association in January 1957.

The club was previously known as Melita Eagles United Soccer Football Club, Melita Eagles-Newtown, Parramatta Melita Eagles, Parramatta Eagles, PCYC Parramatta Eagles.

=== 2007–2012 ===
After having been relegated at the end of the 2006 season from the NSW Premier League, the club evolved into PCYC Parramatta Eagles FC with the backing of the NSW Police Citizens Youth Club, and competed in the NSW Super League in 2007. The Eagles qualified for the finals series in all four seasons under PCYC, suffering defeats in the 2008 and 2009 Grand Finals. As a result of the first team finishing as Premiers in 2010, the club was promoted back to the Premier League.

In 2011, a new partnership was formed between Parramatta Melita Eagles Sports Club and Granville and Districts Soccer Football Association (GDSFA), in which the club became known as Parramatta FC. Although the first grade team finished at the bottom of the NSW Premier League ladder in 2011, strong performances by the Under 20 and Under 18 teams ensured that the club remained eligible to play Premier League football in 2012, due to the state's system of promotion and relegation. The Eagles weren't so lucky in 2012, suffering relegation.

=== 2013–Present Day: National Premier Leagues NSW Introduction ===
In 2013, the Eagles would return to the second division, now labelled the NPL NSW 2, after the introduction of the National Premier Leagues, finishing just outside finals contention. In 2014, Parramatta finished as Minor Premiers and nine points clear at the top of the table. Parramatta lost the Grand Final, returned to the National Premier Leagues NSW competition for the 2015 season.

Surviving relegation on the final day in 2015, and then missing out on the finals series after being just outside the top five for much of the 2016 season, 2017 was the season the club hoped to finally qualify for NPL1 finals football for the first time since the 2002/03 season. What was to come would be a first in the club’s 60 year history. Already struggling at the bottom of the table, an exodus of senior players occurred during the mid season transfer window. Although performances had improved, the team could not avoid finishing bottom of the table and suffering relegation.

Under a new board led by businessman, local community leader and GDSFA treasurer, Steve Elriche, there was hope heading into the 2018 season. The season started very promisingly, however, as the season wore on, the lack of depth in the three senior squads began to reveal issues due to the events which occurred in 2017. The mid season transfer window saw all three grades, in particular 1st Grade, look to strengthen their squads, but the player point system which clubs were to abide by proved a massive obstacle for our club. Parramatta finished last on the Club Championship table for the second season in a row, and suffered a successive relegation.

In 2019, Parramatta FC's 1st Grade side did not have enough wins throughout the regular season to avoid relegation once again, a rare third successive relegation occurred. With the bottom five NSW NPL3 clubs on the Club Championship table to be dropped to compete in the NSW NPL4 competition for the 2020 season (Due to Football NSW's proposed restructuring), the Eagles would finish third last.

== Honours/Highlights ==
- IFFHS World Top 100 Clubs
  - Twice named (2): 1993 (Ranked 90 & 98)
- National Soccer League Cup
  - Winners (2): 1990–91, 1993–94
  - Runners-Up (1): 1992–93
- National Soccer League Challenge Cup
  - Winners (1): 1994
- Maltese Cultural Cup
  - Winners (1): 2020
- Umbro International Cup
  - Winners (1): 1977
- NSW Waratah Cup
  - Runners-Up (1): 1996
- NSW Ampol Cup
  - Runners-Up (2): 1978, 1979
- National Premier Leagues NSW
  - Premiers (6): 1980, 1983, 1986, 1989, 1997, 2001–02
  - Champions (6): 1985, 1988, 1989, 1996, 1997, 2001–02
  - Grand Finalist (4): 1980, 1983, 1986, 1999
- NSW League One
  - Premiers (3): 1977, 2010, 2014
  - Grand Finalist (3): 2008, 2009, 2014
- NSW League Two
  - Premiers (1): 1961

== Divisional history ==
- 1957–1958: NSW Division Two (NL1)
- 1959–1961: NSW Division Three (NL2)
- 1962–1966: NSW Division Two (NL3)
- 1967–1970: NSW Division One (NPL)
- 1971–1977: NSW Division Two (NL1)
- 1978: NSW Division One (NPL)
- 1979–1982: NSW State League (NPL)
- 1983: NSW Division One (NPL)
- 1984: National Soccer League (NSL)
- 1985–1989: NSW Division One (NPL)
- 1989–1995: National Soccer League (NSL)
- 1996–2000: NSW Super League (NPL)
- 2000–2006: NSW Premier League (NPL)
- 2007–2010: NSW Super League (NL1)
- 2011–2012: NSW Premier League (NPL)
- 2013–2014: NSW National Premier League 2 (NL1)
- 2015–2017: NSW National Premier League 1 (NPL)
- 2018: NSW National Premier League 2 (NL1)
- 2019: NSW National Premier League 3 (NL2)
- 2020–2021 : NSW National Premier League 4 (NL3)
- 2022: NSW League Three (NL3)
- 2023: NSW League Two (NL2)

== Notable internationals ==
Argentina

- Hector Martinez

Australia

- Ahmad Elrich
- Alan Hunter (Australian association footballer)
- Andrew Callanan
- Anissa Tann
- Attila Abonyi
- Aytek Genc
- Cliff van Blerk
- David Lowe
- Erik Paartalu
- Gabriel Mendez
- Gary Quested
- George Haniotis
- Glenn Gwynne
- Greg Brown (footballer, born 1962)
- Howard Tredinnick
- James Holland (footballer)
- Joe Spiteri
- John Davies
- Mark Bridge
- Mark Milligan
- Marshall Soper
- Matthew Bingley
- Matthew Jurman
- Mitchell Duke
- Nathan Burns
- Oliver Bozanic
- Peter Katholos
- Robert Wheatley
- Saso Petrovski
- Shannon Cole
- Sharon Dewar
- Tarek Elrich
- Terry Greedy
- Tony Franken
- Tracey Wheeler
- Walter Ardone

Austria

- Karl Jaros

Cameroon

- Cyrille Ndongo-Keller

Guinea

- Ballamodou Conde

Lebanon

- Michael Reda
- Yahya El Hindi

Malta

- Fred Falzon
- Joe Cilia
- Joe 'il Faqi' Farrugia
- Joe 'Ginger' Zammit
- Ray Farrugia

New Zealand

- Istvan Nemet

Philippines

- Dominic del Rosario

Poland

- Jarosław Nowicki

Uruguay

- Washington González

Wales

- Trevor Edwards
