= 1977 West Adelaide SC season =

West Adelaide
1977 season
- Head Coach: Mike Johnson; Billy Birch
- Stadium: Hindmarsh Stadium; Olympic Sports Field
- National Soccer League: 7th
- NSL Cup: Semi-finals
- Top goalscorer: League: John Kosmina (12); All: John Kosmina (13)
- Highest home attendance: 12,328 vs. Adelaide City (19 June 1977); National Soccer League
- Lowest home attendance: 600 vs. Mooroolbark (11 September 1977); National Soccer League
- Average home league attendance: 5,436
- Biggest win: 4–0 vs. Sydney Olympic (A) (17 April 1977); National Soccer League; 5–1 vs. Brisbane Lions (H) (26 June 1977); National Soccer League
- Biggest defeat: 1–4 vs. Adelaide City (H) (19 June 1977); National Soccer League; 0–3 vs. Brisbane City (A) (5 October 1977); NSL Cup

The 1977 season was the first in the National Soccer League for West Adelaide Soccer Club. In addition to the domestic league, they also participated in the NSL Cup. West Adelaide finished 7th in their National Soccer League season, and were eliminated in the semi-finals of the NSL Cup.

== Players ==
Note: Flags indicate national team as defined under FIFA eligibility rules; some limited exceptions apply. Players may hold more than one non-FIFA nationality.

No.	Pos.	Nation	Player
—	MF	AUS	Steve Amos
—	MF	AUS	John Batchelor
—	MF	AUS	Alan Bourke
—	FW	AUS	Peter Boyle
—	GK	AUS	Martyn Crook
—		AUS	Ted de Lyster
—	FW	SCO	Graham Honeyman
—	DF	AUS	David Jones
—	FW	AUS	John Kosmina
—	FW	AUS	George Koulianos
—	FW	AUS	John Krytikos

No.	Pos.	Nation	Player
—	MF	SCO	Gordon McCulloch
—	MF	SCO	Neil McGachey
—	MF	SCO	Ian McGregor
—	FW	AUS	Nick Pantelis
—	FW	AUS	Dave Pillans
—	DF	AUS	Barry Reynolds
—	GK	IRL	Sam Service
—	MF	SCO	Graeme Souness
—		AUS	Lucky Vagianos
—		AUS	Richard Yeeles
—	FW	AUS	Alex Zervas

== Competitions ==
=== Overall record ===
Competition	First match	Last match	Starting round	Final position	Record							
Competition	First match	Last match	Starting round	Final position	Pld	W	D	L	GF	GA	GD	Win %
National Soccer League	2 April 1977	25 September 1977	Matchday 1	7th	26	8	10	8	38	32	+6	30.77
NSL Cup	20 September 1977	5 October 1977	First round	Semi-finals	2	0	1	1	2	5	−3	0.00
Total					28	8	11	9	40	37	+3	28.57

Source: Competitions

=== National Soccer League ===
==== League table ====
Pos	Team	Pld	W	D	L	GF	GA	GD	Pts
5	Western Suburbs	26	11	7	8	38	29	+9	29
6	St George-Budapest	26	7	14	5	39	35	+4	28
7	West Adelaide	26	8	10	8	38	32	+6	26
8	Footscray JUST	26	9	6	11	36	39	−3	24
9	Brisbane Lions	26	9	5	12	27	41	−14	23

Source: rsssf.com
Rules for classification: 1) Points; 2) Goal difference; 3) Goals scored

==== Results summary ====
Overall								Home						Away					
Pld	W	D	L	GF	GA	GD	Pts	W	D	L	GF	GA	GD	W	D	L	GF	GA	GD
26	8	10	8	38	32	+6	34	3	5	5	18	20	−2	5	5	3	20	12	+8

Source: worldfootball.net

==== Results by round ====
Round	1	2	3	4	5	7	8	9	10	6	11	12	13	14	15	16	17	18	19	20	21	22	23	24	25	26
Ground	A	H	A	H	A	A	H	A	H	H	A	H	H	A	H	A	H	H	A	H	A	H	A	H	A	A
Result	W	L	W	D	W	L	D	D	D	D	D	L	W	D	D	D	W	W	L	L	L	L	W	L	D	W
Position	2	6	4	4	4	6	5	5	5	4	5	7	6	6	6	5	5	5	5	6	7	8	7	7	7	7
Points	2	2	4	5	7	7	8	9	10	11	12	12	14	15	16	17	19	21	21	21	21	21	23	23	24	26

Source: worldfootball.net
A = Away; H = Home; W = Win; D = Draw; L = Loss

==== Matches ====
Win Draw Loss

2 April 1977 1	Canberra City	1–3	West Adelaide	Canberra
	Grujicic 76'	Report	Kosmina 7'; Jones 48'; McGachey 52'	Stadium: Manuka Oval; Attendance: 2,500; Referee: Dennis McDermott

11 April 1977 2	West Adelaide	0–1	Western Suburbs	Adelaide
		Report	Norris 45'	Stadium: Hindmarsh Stadium; Attendance: 7,128; Referee: Dennis Stanley

17 April 1977 3	Sydney Olympic	0–4	West Adelaide	Sydney
		Report	Kosmina 42', 46'; McGregor 56'; Honeyman 87'	Stadium: Wentworth Park; Attendance: 6,217; Referee: Barry Wilkinson

24 April 1977 4	West Adelaide	1–1	Fitzroy United	Adelaide
	McGregor 35'	Report	Gillan 28'	Stadium: Hindmarsh Stadium; Attendance: 6,800; Referee: Don Campbell

30 April 1977 5	Footscray JUST	0–1	West Adelaide	Melbourne
		Report	Kosmina 48'	Stadium: Middle Park Soccer Stadium; Attendance: 2,840; Referee: Chris Bambridge

15 May 1977 7	Marconi Fairfield	2–1	West Adelaide	Sydney
	Rooney 71'; Richards 77'	Report	McGregor 4'	Stadium: Marconi Oval; Attendance: 1,652; Referee: Tony Boskovic

22 May 1977 8	West Adelaide	3–3	St George-Budapest	Adelaide
	Kosmina 4', 49'; de Lyster 13'	Report	R. O'Shea 25'; Aitken 27', 86'	Stadium: Hindmarsh Stadium; Attendance: 7,520; Referee: Dennis Stanley

29 May 1977 9	Eastern Suburbs	1–1	West Adelaide	Sydney
	Lutton 77'	Report	Farley 45' (o.g.)	Stadium: Wentworth Park; Attendance: 2,000; Referee: Richard Lorenc

5 June 1977 10	West Adelaide	1–1	South Melbourne	Adelaide
	Boyle 47'	Report	Macdonald 57' (pen.)	Stadium: Hindmarsh Stadium; Attendance: 7,500; Referee: Barry Wilkinson

10 June 1977 6	West Adelaide	3–3	Brisbane City	Adelaide
	Honeyman 12'; Boyle 28' (pen.); Kosmina 48'	Report	Hermiston 52' (pen.); Wallace 80', 84'	Stadium: Hindmarsh Stadium; Attendance: 4,000; Referee: Graham Neal

12 June 1977 11	Mooroolbark	1–1	West Adelaide	Melbourne
	Ellis 83'	Report	Boyle 65'	Stadium: Esther Park; Attendance: 600; Referee: Bob Henderson

19 June 1977 12	West Adelaide	1–4	Adelaide City	Adelaide
	McGachey 59'	Report	Deans 43'; Muniz 76'; Nyskohus 80'; Northcote 89'	Stadium: Hindmarsh Stadium; Attendance: 12,328; Referee: David Yelland

26 June 1977 13	West Adelaide	5–1	Brisbane Lions	Adelaide
	Kosmina 4'; Reynolds 19'; McGregor 48'; McCulloch 59'; Zervas 88'	Report	Morris 77' (pen.)	Stadium: Hindmarsh Stadium; Attendance: 5,115; Referee: Don Campbell

3 July 1977 14	Western Suburbs	1–1	West Adelaide	Sydney
	Ainslie 64'	Report	McCulloch 45'	Stadium: Englefield Stadium; Attendance: 1,347; Referee: Tony Boskovic

9 July 1977 15	West Adelaide	0–0	Canberra City	Adelaide
		Report		Stadium: Olympic Sports Field; Attendance: 2,500; Referee: Dennis Stanley

17 July 1977 16	Fitzroy United	0–0	West Adelaide	Melbourne
		Report		Stadium: Middle Park Soccer Stadium; Attendance: 7,500; Referee: Bob Henderson

24 July 1977 17	West Adelaide	1–0	Sydney Olympic	Adelaide
	Kosmina 80'	Report		Stadium: Hindmarsh Stadium; Attendance: 4,125; Referee: Don Campbell

31 July 1977 18	West Adelaide	1–0	Footscray JUST	Adelaide
	Kosmina 52'	Report		Stadium: Hindmarsh Stadium; Attendance: 4,246; Referee: J. Johnson

7 August 1977 19	Brisbane City	1–0	West Adelaide	Brisbane
	Conner 85'	Report		Stadium: Perry Park; Attendance: 5,223; Referee: Jack Wood

19 August 1977 20	West Adelaide	0–1	Marconi Fairfield	Adelaide
		Report	Mariani 76'	Stadium: Hindmarsh Stadium; Attendance: 4,200; Referee: Dennis Stanley

21 August 1977 21	St George-Budapest	1–0	West Adelaide	Sydney
	Morgan 15'	Report		Stadium: Wentworth Park; Attendance: 2,117; Referee: Brian Fowler

28 August 1977 22	West Adelaide	1–3	Eastern Suburbs	Adelaide
	Krytikos 68'	Report	Smith 2'; Barnes 83'; O'Connor 88'	Stadium: Hindmarsh Stadium; Attendance: 4,600; Referee: Chris Bambridge

3 September 1977 23	South Melbourne	1–2	West Adelaide	Melbourne
	Cummings 66'	Report	Kosmina 19'; Boyle 70'	Stadium: Middle Park Soccer Stadium; Attendance: 2,200; Referee: Jim Dixon

11 September 1977 24	West Adelaide	1–2	Mooroolbark	Adelaide
	Pillans 22'	Report	Lowrey 78'; Fairbrother 79'	Stadium: Hindmarsh Stadium; Attendance: 600; Referee: David Yelland

18 September 1977 25	Adelaide City	2–2	West Adelaide	Adelaide
	Deans 42'; Marocchi 58'	Report	Kosmina 9'; McGachey 90'	Stadium: Olympic Sports Field; Attendance: 10,125; Referee: Tony Boskovic

25 September 1977 26	Brisbane Lions	1–4	West Adelaide	Brisbane
	Spearritt 85'	Report	McGregor 38'; Amos 62'; McGachey 71'; Pantelis 74'	Stadium: Perry Park; Attendance: 2,482; Referee: John Tattersall

=== NSL Cup ===
Win Draw Loss

20 September 1977 First round	West Adelaide	2–2 (a.e.t.) (4–2 p)	Adelaide City	Adelaide
	McGregor 24'; Kosmina 60'	Report	Boyle 70' (o.g.); Northcote 84'	Stadium: Hindmarsh Stadium; Attendance: 8,656

5 October 1977 Semi-finals	Brisbane City	3–0 (a.e.t.)	West Adelaide	Brisbane
	Johnston 93'; Pimblett 102'; Kibbey 118'	Report		Stadium: Perry Park; Attendance: 5,000

== Statistics ==
=== Appearances and goals ===
Includes all competitions. Players with no appearances not included in the list.

No.	Pos.	Nat.	Player	National Soccer League		NSL Cup		Total	
No.	Pos.	Nat.	Player	Apps	Goals	Apps	Goals	Apps	Goals
—	MF	(Australia)	Steve Amos	21+2	1	2	0	25	1
—	MF	(Australia)	John Batchelor	1	0	1	0	2	0
—	MF	(Australia)	Alan Bourke	0+1	0	0	0	1	0
—	FW	(Australia)	Peter Boyle	16+2	4	2	0	20	4
—	GK	(Australia)	Martyn Crook	20+1	0	2	0	23	0
—	—	(Australia)	Ted de Lyster	6+4	1	0	0	10	1
—	FW	(Scotland)	Graham Honeyman	15+2	2	0	0	17	2
—	DF	(Australia)	David Jones	25	1	2	0	27	1
—	FW	(Australia)	John Kosmina	23	12	2	1	25	13
—	FW	(Australia)	George Koulianos	2	0	0+1	0	3	0
—	FW	(Australia)	John Krytikos	0+5	0	0+1	0	6	0
—	MF	(Scotland)	Gordon McCulloch	17+1	2	0	0	18	2
—	MF	(Scotland)	Neil McGachey	24	4	2	0	26	4
—	MF	(Scotland)	Ian McGregor	24	5	2	1	26	6
—	FW	(Australia)	Nick Pantelis	4+6	1	2	0	12	1
—	FW	(Australia)	Dave Pillans	19	1	1	0	20	1
—	DF	(Australia)	Barry Reynolds	24	1	2	0	26	1
—	GK	(Republic of Ireland)	Sam Service	6	0	0	0	6	0
—	MF	(Scotland)	Graeme Souness	5	0	0	0	5	0
—	—	(Australia)	Lucky Vagianos	23+1	0	2	0	26	0
—	—	(Australia)	Richard Yeeles	4+1	0	0	0	5	0
—	FW	(Australia)	Alex Zervas	7+4	1	0	0	11	1

=== Disciplinary record ===
Includes all competitions. The list is sorted by squad number when total cards are equal. Players with no cards not included in the list.

Rank	No.	Pos.	Nat.	Player	National Soccer League			NSL Cup			Total		
Rank	No.	Pos.	Nat.	Player	Yellow card	Second yellow card	Red card	Yellow card	Second yellow card	Red card	Yellow card	Second yellow card	Red card
1	—	FW	(Australia)	Dave Pillans	3	0	2	0	0	0	3	0	2
2	—	FW	(Scotland)	Graham Honeyman	2	0	2	0	0	0	2	0	2
3	—	FW	(Australia)	Nick Pantelis	1	0	1	0	0	0	1	0	1
4	—	MF	(Australia)	Steve Amos	5	0	0	0	0	0	5	0	0
5	—	—	(Australia)	Lucky Vagianos	4	0	0	0	0	0	4	0	0
6	—	DF	(Australia)	Barry Reynolds	3	0	0	0	0	0	3	0	0
7	—	FW	(Australia)	Lucky Vagianos	2	0	0	0	0	0	2	0	0
7	—	MF	(Scotland)	Gordon McCulloch	2	0	0	0	0	0	2	0	0
7	—	MF	(Scotland)	Neil McGachey	2	0	0	0	0	0	2	0	0
7	—	FW	(Australia)	Alex Zervas	2	0	0	0	0	0	2	0	0
11	—	FW	(Australia)	Peter Boyle	1	0	0	0	0	0	1	0	0
11	—	DF	(Australia)	David Jones	1	0	0	0	0	0	1	0	0
11	—	MF	(Scotland)	Graeme Souness	1	0	0	0	0	0	1	0	0
Total					29	0	5	0	0	0	29	0	5

=== Clean sheets ===
Includes all competitions. The list is sorted by squad number when total clean sheets are equal. Numbers in parentheses represent games where both goalkeepers participated and both kept a clean sheet; the number in parentheses is awarded to the goalkeeper who was substituted on, whilst a full clean sheet is awarded to the goalkeeper who was on the field at the start of play. Goalkeepers with no clean sheets not included in the list.

Rank	No.	Nat.	Goalkeeper	NSL	NSL Cup	Total
1	—	(Australia)	Martyn Crook	6	0	6
Total				6	0	6
