= 1977 Adelaide City FC season =

Adelaide City
1977 season
- Manager: Edmund Kreft
- Stadium: Olympic Sports Field
- National Soccer League: 4th
- NSL Cup: First round
- Top goalscorer: League: Dixie Deans (16); All: Dixie Deans (16)
- Highest home attendance: 13,132 vs. Marconi Fairfield (3 July 1977); National Soccer League
- Lowest home attendance: 4,600 vs. South Melbourne (21 August 1977); National Soccer League
- Average home league attendance: 7,990
- Biggest win: 10–3 vs. Mooroolbark (H) (4 September 1977); National Soccer League
- Biggest defeat: 1–6 vs. Eastern Suburbs (A) (7 May 1977); National Soccer League

The 1977 season was the first in the National Soccer League for Adelaide City Football Club. In addition to the domestic league, Adelaide City competed in the NSL Cup. The record for most goals in a game in Australia, was set by Adelaide City and Mooroolbark where Adelaide won 10–3 in Adelaide.

== Players ==
Note: Flags indicate national team as defined under FIFA eligibility rules; some limited exceptions apply. Players may hold more than one non-FIFA nationality.

No.	Pos.	Nation	Player
—	MF	AUS	Ian Bendall
—	DF	AUS	John Besir
—	FW	SCO	Dixie Deans
—		AUS	Ian Di Bartollo
—		AUS	Ron Fraser
—	FW	AUS	David Leane
—	MF	ENG	Frank Lister
—	MF	AUS	Gary Marocchi
—	MF	YUG	Zoran Matić

No.	Pos.	Nation	Player
—	FW	AUS	Sergio Melta
—	MF	AUS	Agenor Muniz
—	MF	AUS	Brian Northcote
—	FW	AUS	John Nyskohus
—	MF	AUS	John Perin
—		AUS	John Pope
—	GK	AUS	Roger Romanowicz
—		AUS	Philip Russo
—	DF	AUS	Fred Yung

== Transfers ==
=== Transfers in ===
Date from	Position	Name	From	Fee	Ref.
26 January 1977	FW	(Portugal) Tito Amarito	—	Free transfer	
26 January 1977	MF	Ian Bendall	Western Suburbs	Free transfer	

=== Loans in ===
Start date	Position	Name	From	End date	Ref.
26 January 1977	FW	John Nyskohus	(Australia) Lion	January 1980	

== Competitions ==
=== Overall record ===
Competition	First match	Last match	Starting round	Final position	Record							
Competition	First match	Last match	Starting round	Final position	Pld	W	D	L	GF	GA	GD	Win %
National Soccer League	3 April 1977	25 September 1977	Matchday 1	4th	26	12	7	7	50	31	+19	46.15
NSL Cup	20 September 1977		First round	First round	1	0	1	0	2	2	+0	0.00
Total					27	12	8	7	52	33	+19	44.44

Source: Competitions

=== National Soccer League ===
==== League table ====
Pos	Team	Pld	W	D	L	GF	GA	GD	Pts
2	Marconi Fairfield	26	15	7	4	42	21	+21	37
3	Fitzroy United	26	12	8	6	41	34	+7	32
4	Adelaide City	26	12	7	7	50	31	+19	31
5	Western Suburbs	26	11	7	8	38	29	+9	29
6	St George-Budapest	26	7	14	5	39	35	+4	28

Source: rsssf.com
Rules for classification: 1) Points; 2) Goal difference; 3) Goals scored

==== Results summary ====
Overall								Home						Away					
Pld	W	D	L	GF	GA	GD	Pts	W	D	L	GF	GA	GD	W	D	L	GF	GA	GD
26	12	7	7	50	31	+19	43	7	3	3	29	13	+16	5	4	4	21	18	+3

Source: worldfootball.net

==== Results by round ====
Round	1	2	3	4	5	6	7	8	9	10	11	12	13	14	16	17	18	19	20	15	21	22	23	24	25	26
Ground	H	A	H	A	H	A	H	A	H	A	H	A	A	H	H	A	A	H	A	A	H	A	H	A	H	H
Result	D	W	W	W	L	L	W	D	W	W	W	W	L	W	D	D	D	L	L	D	W	L	W	W	D	L
Position	6	3	2	2	3	6	3	3	3	3	2	1	3	1	2	3	3	3	3	2	3	4	4	4	4	4
Points	1	3	5	7	7	7	9	10	12	14	16	18	18	20	21	22	23	23	23	24	26	26	28	30	31	31

Source: worldfootball.net
A = Away; H = Home; W = Win; D = Draw; L = Loss

==== Matches ====
Win Draw Loss

3 April 1977 1	Adelaide City	0–0	Brisbane Lions	Adelaide
		Report		Stadium: Olympic Sports Field; Attendance: 6,230; Referee: Don Campbell

11 April 1977 2	Marconi Fairfield	0–4	Adelaide City	Sydney
		Report	Leane 23'; Nyskohus 53', 70'; Matic 64'	Stadium: Marconi Oval; Attendance: 3,650; Referee: Bill Jones

17 April 1977 3	Adelaide City	2–0	Canberra City	Adelaide
	Perin 25' (pen.); Nyskohus 41'	Report		Stadium: Olympic Sports Field; Attendance: 7,000; Referee: Graham Neal

23 April 1977 4	St George-Budapest	0–2	Adelaide City	Sydney
		Report	Nyskohus 54'; Northcote 63'	Stadium: Sydney Sports Ground; Attendance: 1,338; Referee: Tony Boskovic

1 May 1977 5	Adelaide City	1–2	Western Suburbs	Adelaide
	Melta 53'	Report	Norris 32', 38'	Stadium: Olympic Sports Field; Attendance: 11,300; Referee: Dennis Stanley

7 May 1977 6	Eastern Suburbs	6–1	Adelaide City	Sydney
	Silva 15'; Smith 20'; Barnes 41', 43', 53'; Lutton 70'	Report	Marocchi 19'	Stadium: Sydney Sports Ground; Attendance: 2,800; Referee: Barry Wilkinson

15 May 1977 7	Adelaide City	3–0	Sydney Olympic	Adelaide
	Muniz 1'; Deans 21'; Northcote 32'	Report		Stadium: Olympic Sports Field; Attendance: 10,500; Referee: Don Campbell

21 May 1977 8	South Melbourne	0–0	Adelaide City	Melbourne
		Report		Stadium: Middle Park; Attendance: 5,200; Referee: Chris Bambridge

29 May 1977 9	Adelaide City	1–0	Fitzroy United	Adelaide
	Nyskohus 66'	Report		Stadium: Olympic Sports Field; Attendance: 7,500; Referee: Graham Neal

5 June 1977 10	Mooroolbark	1–3	Adelaide City	Melbourne
	Cleary 53'	Report	Marocchi 11'; Leane 54'; Deans 69'	Stadium: Middle Park; Attendance: 300; Referee: Jim Dixon

12 June 1977 11	Adelaide City	4–1	Footscray JUST	Adelaide
	Leane 25'; Marocchi 38'; Deans 49'; Nyskohus 55'	Report		Stadium: Olympic Sports Field; Attendance: 6,000; Referee: Dennis Stanley

19 June 1977 12	West Adelaide	1–4	Adelaide City	Adelaide
	McGachey 59'	Report	Deans 43'; Muniz 76'; Nyskohus 80'; Northcote 89'	Stadium: Hindmarsh Stadium; Attendance: 12,328; Referee: David Yelland

26 June 1977 13	Brisbane City	1–0	Adelaide City	Brisbane
	Gaffney 7'	Report		Stadium: Perry Park; Attendance: 6,249; Referee: Des Miles

3 July 1977 14	Adelaide City	1–0	Marconi Fairfield	Adelaide
	Nyskohus 14'	Report		Stadium: Olympic Sports Field; Attendance: 13,132; Referee: Don Campbell

17 July 1977 16	Adelaide City	1–1	St George-Budapest	Adelaide
	Northcote 31'	Report	O'Connor 52'	Stadium: Olympic Sports Field; Attendance: 6,200; Referee: Graham Neal

23 July 1977 17	Canberra City	1–1	Adelaide City	Canberra
	Grujicic 23'	Report	Deans 75'	Stadium: Manuka Oval; Attendance: 1,700; Referee: Brian Fowler

31 July 1977 18	Western Suburbs	0–0	Adelaide City	Sydney
		Report		Stadium: Englefield Stadium; Attendance: 1,796; Referee: Tony Boskovic

7 August 1977 19	Adelaide City	1–2	Eastern Suburbs	Adelaide
	Deans 12'	Report	Smith 6', 52'	Stadium: Olympic Sports Field; Attendance: 8,500; Referee: Stewart Mellings

14 August 1977 20	Sydney Olympic	3–1	Adelaide City	Sydney
	Senkalski 29'; McIntosh 34'; Botham 68'	Report	Deans 85'	Stadium: Sydney Sports Ground; Attendance: 1,025; Referee: Peter Rampley

17 August 1977 15	Brisbane Lions	1–1	Adelaide City	Brisbane
	Morris 70'	Report	Marocchi 81'	Stadium: Perry Park; Attendance: 3,207; Referee: Jack Wood

21 August 1977 21	Adelaide City	2–0	South Melbourne	Adelaide
	Leane 75'; Northcote 90'	Report		Stadium: Olympic Sports Field; Attendance: 4,600; Referee: Richard Lorenc

28 August 1977 22	Fitzroy United	1–0	Adelaide City	Melbourne
	Buljevic 82'	Report		Stadium: Olympic Park; Attendance: 5,500; Referee: Nick Karlich

4 September 1977 23	Adelaide City	10–3	Mooroolbark	Adelaide
	Deans 9', 46', 53', 57'; Perin 25', 69'; Leane 59'; Nyskohus 64'; Marocchi 72'; Northcote 84'	Report	Fairbrother 43'; McGregor 82'; Lowe 89'	Stadium: Olympic Sports Field; Attendance: 4,700; Referee: Graham Neal

11 September 1977 24	Footscray JUST	3–4	Adelaide City	Melbourne
	Picioane 3'; Vasic 14'; Ristovski 77' (pen.)	Report	Deans 33', 73', 79' (pen.); Northcote 52'	Stadium: Olympic Park; Attendance: 2,500; Referee: Chris Bambridge

18 September 1977 25	Adelaide City	2–2	West Adelaide	Adelaide
	Deans 42'; Marocchi 58'	Report	Kosmina 9'; McGachey 90'	Stadium: Olympic Sports Field; Attendance: 10,125; Referee: Tony Boskovic

25 September 1977 26	Adelaide City	1–2	Brisbane City	Adelaide
	Deans 55'	Report	Caldwell 39'; Conner 57'	Stadium: Olympic Sports Field; Referee: Dennis Stanley

=== NSL Cup ===
Win Draw Loss

20 September 1977 First round	West Adelaide	2–2 (a.e.t.) (4–2 p)	Adelaide City	Adelaide
	McGregor 24'; Kosmina 60'	Report	Boyle 70' (o.g.); Northcote 84'	Stadium: Hindmarsh Stadium; Attendance: 8,656; Referee: Dennis Stanley

== Statistics ==
=== Appearances and goals ===
Includes all competitions. Players with no appearances not included in the list.

No.	Pos.	Nat.	Player	National Soccer League		NSL Cup		Total	
No.	Pos.	Nat.	Player	Apps	Goals	Apps	Goals	Apps	Goals
—	MF	(Australia)	Ian Bendall	0+2	0	0	0	2	0
—	DF	(Australia)	John Besir	1+6	0	0	0	7	0
—	FW	(Scotland)	Dixie Deans	19	16	1	0	20	16
—	—	(Australia)	Ian Di Bartollo	1+6	0	0	0	7	0
—	—	(Australia)	Ron Fraser	15+1	0	1	0	17	0
—	FW	(Australia)	David Leane	15+5	5	0+1	0	21	5
—	DF	(England)	Frank Lister	20	0	0	0	20	0
—	MF	(Australia)	Gary Marocchi	24	6	1	0	25	6
—	GK	(Australia)	Peter Marshall	3+2	0	0+1	0	6	0
—	MF	(Socialist Federal Republic of Yugoslavia)	Zoran Matic	25	1	1	0	26	1
—	MF	(Australia)	Sergio Melta	20+2	1	0	0	22	1
—	MF	(Australia)	Agenor Muniz	17+1	2	1	0	19	2
—	MF	(Australia)	Brian Northcote	24+1	7	1	1	26	8
—	DF	(Australia)	Bugsy Nyskohus	5	0	1	0	6	0
—	FW	(Australia)	John Nyskohus	23+1	9	1	0	25	9
—	MF	(Australia)	John Perin	26	3	1	0	27	3
—	—	(Australia)	John Pope	0+2	0	0	0	2	0
—	GK	(Australia)	Roger Romanowicz	23	0	1	0	24	0
—	—	(Australia)	Philip Russo	0+2	0	0	0	2	0
—	DF	(Australia)	Fred Yung	25	0	1	0	26	0

=== Disciplinary record ===
Includes all competitions. The list is sorted by squad number when total cards are equal. Players with no cards not included in the list.

Rank	No.	Pos.	Nat.	Player	National Soccer League			NSL Cup			Total		
Rank	No.	Pos.	Nat.	Player	Yellow card	Second yellow card	Red card	Yellow card	Second yellow card	Red card	Yellow card	Second yellow card	Red card
1	—	DF	(England)	Frank Lister	3	0	0	0	0	0	3	0	0
1	—	MF	(Australia)	Agenor Muniz	3	0	0	0	0	0	3	0	0
1	—	MF	(Australia)	Brian Northcote	3	0	0	0	0	0	3	0	0
4	—	FW	(Scotland)	Dixie Deans	1	0	0	0	0	0	1	0	0
4	—	MF	(Australia)	Gary Marocchi	1	0	0	0	0	0	1	0	0
4	—	MF	(Socialist Federal Republic of Yugoslavia)	Zoran Matić	1	0	0	0	0	0	1	0	0
4	—	MF	(Australia)	Sergio Melta	1	0	0	0	0	0	1	0	0
4	—	MF	(Australia)	John Perin	1	0	0	0	0	0	1	0	0
Total					14	0	0	0	0	0	14	0	0

=== Clean sheets ===
Includes all competitions. The list is sorted by squad number when total clean sheets are equal. Numbers in parentheses represent games where both goalkeepers participated and both kept a clean sheet; the number in parentheses is awarded to the goalkeeper who was substituted on, whilst a full clean sheet is awarded to the goalkeeper who was on the field at the start of play. Goalkeepers with no clean sheets not included in the list.

Rank	No.	Nat.	Goalkeeper	NSL	NSL Cup	Total
1	—	(Australia)	Roger Romanowicz	9	0	9
Total				9	0	9
