= 1977 Mooroolbark SC season =

Mooroolbark
1977 season
- Manager: Archie Campbell; Brian Edgely
- Stadium: Middle Park Soccer Stadium; Wembley Park; Esther Park
- National Soccer League: 14th
- NSL Cup: Second round
- Top goalscorer: League: Gordon McGregor; Joe Tront (7 each); All: Gordon McGregor; Joe Tront (7 each)
- Highest home attendance: 5,200 vs. Western Suburbs (10 July 1977); National Soccer League
- Lowest home attendance: 300 vs. Adelaide City (5 June 1977); National Soccer League
- Average home league attendance: 1,481
- Biggest win: 4–1 vs. Canberra City (A) (24 September 1977); National Soccer League
- Biggest defeat: 3–10 vs. Adelaide City (A) (4 September 1977); National Soccer League

The 1977 season was the first in the National Soccer League for Mooroolbark Soccer Club. In addition to the domestic league, they also participated in the NSL Cup. Mooroolbark finished 14th to be relegated in their National Soccer League season, and were eliminated in the NSL Cup second round by Fitzroy United.

== Players ==
Note: Flags indicate national team as defined under FIFA eligibility rules; some limited exceptions apply. Players may hold more than one non-FIFA nationality.

No.	Pos.	Nation	Player
1	GK	AUS	Lou Ivanoff
2	GK	AUS	Paul Wilding
3	DF	AUS	Alan Pongho
4		AUS	Mike Sinclair
5	MF	AUS	Peter Vaughan
6	DF	AUS	David Ellis
7	DF	RSA	Paul Ontong
8	DF	RSA	Geoff Ontong
9		AUS	Max Irvan
10	FW	AUS	Mike Cleary
11		AUS	Mike Shuttleworth
13		ENG	Pat Lowrey
18		AUS	Nick Lowe

No.	Pos.	Nation	Player
19	DF	AUS	Ian Williamson
—		AUS	Derek Bailey
—	FW	AUS	Walter Bojczuk
—	FW	ENG	Barrie Fairbrother
—	GK	AUS	Terence Hawke
—	DF	AUS	Malcolm Hayward
—		AUS	Eugene McConville
—	FW	SCO	Gordon McGregor
—		AUS	Paul O'Reilly
—		AUS	Paul Priestley
—	MF	AUS	Dave Rigby
—	MF	AUS	Brian Thorn
—	FW	SCO	Joe Tront

== Competitions ==
=== Overview ===
Competition	First match	Last match	Starting round	Final position	Record							
Competition	First match	Last match	Starting round	Final position	Pld	W	D	L	GF	GA	GD	Win %
National Soccer League	3 April 1977	24 September 1977	Matchday 1	14th	26	5	5	16	31	61	−30	19.23
NSL Cup	22 September 1977	2 October 1977	First round	Quarter-finals	2	1	0	1	1	3	−2	50.00
Total					28	6	5	17	32	64	−32	21.43

Source: Competitions

=== National Soccer League ===
==== League table ====
Pos	Team	Pld	W	D	L	GF	GA	GD	Pts	Relegation
10	Brisbane City	26	8	6	12	30	35	−5	22	
11	South Melbourne	26	7	8	11	27	35	−8	22	
12	Sydney Olympic	26	7	7	12	25	38	−13	21	
13	Canberra City	26	5	7	14	22	39	−17	17	
14	Mooroolbark (R)	26	5	5	16	31	61	−30	15	Relegation to the 1978 Victoria Metropolitan League Three

Source: rsssf.com
Rules for classification: 1) Points; 2) Goal difference; 3) Goals scored
(R) Relegated

==== Results summary ====
Overall								Home						Away					
Pld	W	D	L	GF	GA	GD	Pts	W	D	L	GF	GA	GD	W	D	L	GF	GA	GD
26	5	5	16	31	61	−30	20	2	5	6	17	24	−7	3	0	10	14	37	−23

Source: worldfootball.net

==== Results by round ====
Round	1	2	3	4	5	6	7	8	9	10	11	12	13	14	15	16	17	18	19	20	21	22	23	24	25	26
Ground	A	H	A	H	A	H	A	H	A	H	H	A	H	A	H	A	H	H	A	H	A	H	A	A	H	A
Result	L	D	L	D	L	L	L	D	L	L	D	L	W	W	L	L	L	D	L	W	L	L	L	W	L	W
Position	14	13	14	13	13	14	14	14	14	14	14	14	14	13	14	14	14	14	14	14	14	14	14	14	14	14
Points	0	1	1	2	2	2	2	3	3	3	4	4	6	8	8	8	8	9	9	11	11	11	11	13	13	15

Source: worldfootball.net
A = Away; H = Home; W = Win; D = Draw; L = Loss

==== Matches ====
Win Draw Loss

3 April 1977 1	Western Suburbs	5–0	Mooroolbark	Sydney
	Lindsay 8'; Fryer 46'; Harding 61'; Eaton 68'; Norris 73'	Report		Stadium: Sydney Sports Ground; Attendance: 1,000; Referee: Peter Rampley

10 April 1977 2	Mooroolbark	1–1	Sydney Olympic	Melbourne
	Tront 39' (pen.)	Report	Botham 28'	Stadium: Middle Park; Attendance: 2,100; Referee: Bob Henderson

16 April 1977 3	Fitzroy United	2–0	Mooroolbark	Melbourne
	Gillan 34'; Cole 52'	Report		Stadium: Middle Park; Attendance: 1,500; Referee: Tony Beazleigh

24 April 1977 4	Mooroolbark	2–2	Footscray JUST	Melbourne
	Bojczuk 25'; Tront 72' (pen.)	Report	Parrott 38'; Kondarios 47'	Stadium: Wembley Park; Attendance: 1,800; Referee: Jim Dixon

1 May 1977 5	Brisbane City	3–1	Mooroolbark	Brisbane
	Coyne 7'; Hermiston 13' (pen.); Gaffney 61'	Report	McGregor 87'	Stadium: Perry Park; Attendance: 6,514; Referee: Jack Wood

7 May 1977 6	Mooroolbark	2–3	Marconi Fairfield	Melbourne
	Tront 21' (pen.); Pongho 31'	Report	Sharne 20'; Byrne 57' (pen.); Richards 78'	Stadium: Middle Park; Attendance: 1,100; Referee: Bob Henderson

14 May 1977 7	St George-Budapest	5–1	Mooroolbark	Sydney
	R. O'Shea 5'; O'Connor 26', 51'; J. O'Shea 44'; Morgan 70'	Report	Tront 28' (pen.)	Stadium: Sydney Sports Ground; Attendance: 620; Referee: Peter Rampley

22 May 1977 8	Mooroolbark	2–2	Eastern Suburbs	Melbourne
	P. Ontong 56'; Tront 65'	Report	Stevenson 11'; de Melo 26'	Stadium: Wembley Park; Attendance: 1,150; Referee: Stewart Mellings

28 May 1977 9	South Melbourne	2–0	Mooroolbark	Melbourne
	Gibson 17'; Rogers 50'	Report		Stadium: Middle Park; Attendance: 4,000; Referee: David Yelland

5 June 1977 10	Mooroolbark	1–3	Adelaide City	Melbourne
	Cleary 53'	Report	Marocchi 11'; Leane 54'; Deans 69'	Stadium: Middle Park; Attendance: 300; Referee: Jim Dixon

12 June 1977 11	Mooroolbark	1–1	West Adelaide	Melbourne
	Ellis 83'	Report	Boyle 65'	Stadium: Esther Park; Attendance: 600; Referee: Bob Henderson

19 June 1977 12	Brisbane Lions	2–1	Mooroolbark	Brisbane
	Fagan 5'; Neale 10'	Report	Tront 84'	Stadium: Perry Park; Attendance: 4,218; Referee: Dave Nugent

26 June 1977 13	Mooroolbark	3–2	Canberra City	Melbourne
	McGregor 40'; Tront 62'; Lowrey 77'	Report	Bourke 50'; Henderson 62'	Stadium: Esther Park; Attendance: 550; Referee: Chris Bambridge

3 July 1977 14	Sydney Olympic	1–2	Mooroolbark	Sydney
	Pirie 11' (pen.)	Report	P. Ontong 80', 84'	Stadium: Wentworth Park; Attendance: 4,982; Referee: Dennis McDermott

10 July 1977 15	Mooroolbark	0–2	Western Suburbs	Melbourne
		Report	Stone 65'; Ainslie 87' (pen.)	Stadium: Middle Park; Attendance: 5,200; Referee: Nick Karlich

17 July 1977 16	Footscray JUST	1–0	Mooroolbark	Melbourne
	G. Ontong 50' (o.g.)	Report		Stadium: Middle Park; Attendance: 7,500; Referee: David Yelland

24 July 1977 17	Mooroolbark	1–2	Fitzroy United	Melbourne
	Rigby 80'	Report	Campbell 67'; Bozikas 82'	Stadium: Esther Park; Attendance: 1,255; Referee: Stewart Mellings

30 July 1977 18	Mooroolbark	1–1	Brisbane City	Melbourne
	Fairbrother 76'	Report	Gaffney 31'	Stadium: Middle Park; Attendance: 3,000; Referee: Jim Dixon

7 August 1977 19	Marconi Fairfield	1–0	Mooroolbark	Sydney
	Mariani 42'	Report		Stadium: Marconi Oval; Attendance: 3,456; Referee: Bill Jones

13 August 1977 20	Mooroolbark	1–0	St George-Budapest	Melbourne
	McGregor 33'	Report		Stadium: Esther Park; Attendance: 800; Referee: Nick Karlich

21 August 1977 21	Eastern Suburbs	3–0	Mooroolbark	Sydney
	Lutton 62'; McGuinness 88'; Barnes 89'	Report		Stadium: Wentworth Park; Attendance: 2,117; Referee: Doug Rennie

28 August 1977 22	Mooroolbark	2–4	South Melbourne	Melbourne
	McGregor 30', 39' (pen.)	Report	Ollerton 24', 65', 73'; French 85'	Stadium: Esther Park; Attendance: 1,000; Referee: Tony Beazleigh

4 September 1977 23	Adelaide City	10–3	Mooroolbark	Adelaide
	Deans 9', 46', 53', 57'; Perin 25', 69'; Leane 59'; Nyskohus 64'; Marocchi 72'; Northcote 84'	Report	Fairbrother 43'; McGregor 82'; Lowe 89'	Stadium: Olympic Sports Field; Attendance: 4,700; Referee: Graham Neal

11 September 1977 24	West Adelaide	1–2	Mooroolbark	Adelaide
	Pillans 22'	Report	Lowrey 78'; Fairbrother 79'	Stadium: Hindmarsh Stadium; Attendance: 600; Referee: David Yelland

18 September 1977 25	Mooroolbark	0–1	Brisbane Lions	Melbourne
		Report	Neale 85'	Stadium: Esther Park; Attendance: 399; Referee: Stewart Mellings

24 September 1977 26	Canberra City	1–4	Mooroolbark	Canberra
	Moulis 4'	Report	Lowrey 15', 71'; McGregor 47'; P. Ontong 58'	Stadium: Manuka Oval; Attendance: 1,200; Referee: Ken Allan

=== NSL Cup ===
Win Draw Loss

22 September 1977 First round	Mooroolbark	1–0	South Melbourne	Melbourne
	Lowrey 44'	Report		Stadium: Olympic Park; Attendance: 4,000; Referee: Tony Boskovic

2 October 1977 Quarter-finals	Fitzroy United	3–0	Mooroolbark	Melbourne
	Buljevic 15', 77'; Cole 50'	Report		Stadium: Olympic Park; Attendance: 2,000; Referee: Barry Wilkinson

== Statistics ==
=== Appearances and goals ===
Includes all competitions. Players with no appearances not included in the list.

No.	Pos.	Nat.	Player	National Soccer League		NSL Cup		Total	
No.	Pos.	Nat.	Player	Apps	Goals	Apps	Goals	Apps	Goals
1	GK	(Australia)	Lou Ivanoff	9	0	2	0	11	0
2	GK	(Australia)	Paul Wilding	13+1	0	0	0	14	0
3	DF	(Australia)	Alan Pongho	22	1	2	0	24	1
4	—	(Australia)	Mike Sinclair	5+2	0	0	0	7	0
5	MF	(Australia)	Peter Vaughan	21	0	1	0	22	0
6	DF	(Australia)	David Ellis	8+6	1	0	0	14	1
7	DF	(South Africa)	Paul Ontong	22+3	4	2	0	27	4
8	DF	(South Africa)	Geoff Ontong	23+2	0	2	0	27	0
9	—	(Australia)	Max Irvan	21+1	0	1	0	23	0
10	FW	(Australia)	Mike Cleary	11+1	0	0	0	12	0
11	—	(Australia)	Mike Shuttleworth	3	0	0	0	3	0
13	—	(England)	Pat Lowrey	15+2	4	2	1	19	5
18	—	(Australia)	Nick Lowe	6	1	2	0	8	1
19	DF	(Australia)	Ian Williamson	6+2	0	2	0	10	0
—	—	(Australia)	Derek Bailey	6+1	0	0	0	7	0
—	FW	(Australia)	Walter Bojczuk	14+6	1	0	0	20	1
—	FW	(England)	Barrie Fairbrother	12	3	2	0	14	3
—	GK	(Australia)	Terence Hawke	4	0	0	0	4	0
—	DF	(Australia)	Malcolm Hayward	0+2	0	0	0	2	0
—	—	(Australia)	Eugene McConville	0+1	0	0	0	1	0
—	FW	(Scotland)	Gordon McGregor	15+4	7	2	0	21	7
—	—	(Australia)	Paul O'Reilly	8+1	0	0+1	0	10	0
—	—	(Australia)	Paul Priestley	1+3	0	0	0	4	0
—	MF	(Australia)	Dave Rigby	17	1	2	0	19	1
—	MF	(Australia)	Brian Thorn	11+3	0	0+2	0	16	0
—	FW	(Scotland)	Joe Tront	13	7	0	0	13	7

=== Disciplinary record ===
Includes all competitions. The list is sorted by squad number when total cards are equal. Players with no cards not included in the list.

Rank	No.	Pos.	Nat.	Player	National Soccer League			NSL Cup			Total		
Rank	No.	Pos.	Nat.	Player	Yellow card	Second yellow card	Red card	Yellow card	Second yellow card	Red card	Yellow card	Second yellow card	Red card
1	7	DF	(South Africa)	Paul Ontong	3	0	0	1	0	0	4	0	0
2	8	DF	(South Africa)	Geoff Ontong	3	0	0	0	0	0	3	0	0
3	3	DF	(Australia)	Alan Pongho	2	0	0	0	0	0	2	0	0
3	9	—	(Australia)	Max Irvan	2	0	0	0	0	0	2	0	0
5	4	—	(Australia)	Mike Sinclair	1	0	0	0	0	0	1	0	0
5	6	DF	(Australia)	David Ellis	1	0	0	0	0	0	1	0	0
5	18	—	(Australia)	Nick Lowe	0	0	0	1	0	0	1	0	0
5	19	DF	(Australia)	Ian Williamson	1	0	0	0	0	0	1	0	0
5	—	—	(Australia)	Derek Bailey	1	0	0	0	0	0	1	0	0
5	—	FW	(Australia)	Walter Bojczuk	1	0	0	0	0	0	1	0	0
5	—	FW	(England)	Barrie Fairbrother	1	0	0	0	0	0	1	0	0
5	—	—	(Australia)	Paul Priestly	1	0	0	0	0	0	1	0	0
5	—	MF	(Australia)	Brian Thorn	1	0	0	0	0	0	1	0	0
Total					18	0	0	2	0	0	20	0	0

=== Clean sheets ===
Includes all competitions. The list is sorted by squad number when total clean sheets are equal. Numbers in parentheses represent games where both goalkeepers participated and both kept a clean sheet; the number in parentheses is awarded to the goalkeeper who was substituted on, whilst a full clean sheet is awarded to the goalkeeper who was on the field at the start of play. Goalkeepers with no clean sheets not included in the list.

Rank	No.	Nat.	Goalkeeper	NSL	NSL Cup	Total
1	1	(Australia)	Lou Ivanoff	0	1	1
1	2	(Australia)	Paul Wilding	1	0	1
Total				1	1	2
