= 1977 Brisbane City FC season =

Brisbane City
1977 season
- Head Coach: Iain Kesson; Nereo Saftich
- Stadium: Perry Park
- National Soccer League: 10th
- NSL Cup: Winners
- Top goalscorer: League: Willie Conner (4); John Coyne (4); Ian Johnston (4); All: Ian Johnston (6)
- Highest home attendance: 7,000 vs. Marconi Fairfield (9 October 1977); NSL Cup
- Lowest home attendance: 3,870 vs. Footscray JUST (18 September 1977); National Soccer League
- Average home league attendance: 5,391
- Biggest win: 3–0 vs. Sydney Olympic (H) (5 September 1977); National Soccer League; 3–0 vs. West Adelaide (H) (5 October 1977); NSL Cup
- Biggest defeat: 0–4 vs. Sydney Olympic (A) (5 June 1977); National Soccer League

The 1977 season was the first in the National Soccer League for Brisbane City Football Club. In addition to the domestic league, they also participated in the inaugural NSL Cup. Although Brisbane City finished 10th in their National Soccer League season, they were winners in the NSL Cup.

== Players ==
Note: Flags indicate national team as defined under FIFA eligibility rules; some limited exceptions apply. Players may hold more than one non-FIFA nationality.

No.	Pos.	Nation	Player
—	GK	ARG	Osvaldo Borzi
—	FW	AUS	Kevin Caldwell
—	FW	AUS	Willie Conner
—	FW	AUS	John Coyne
—	MF	AUS	Roberto Echeverria
—	MF	AUS	Larry Gaffney
—	DF	AUS	Karl Herdle
—	DF	SCO	Jim Hermiston
—	FW	AUS	Ian Johnston
—	FW	AUS	Brian Kibbey

No.	Pos.	Nation	Player
—		AUS	Ron Kidd
—	MF	SCO	John Lavelle
—	MF	SCO	Tom McLeod
—	DF	DEN	Peter Neilson
—		AUS	Ian Perry
—	MF	ENG	Frank Pimblett
—	DF	SCO	Ian Rathmell
—	DF	AUS	Peter Tokesi
—	FW	AUS	Craig Wallace

== Competitions ==
=== Overall record ===
Competition	First match	Last match	Starting round	Final position	Record							
Competition	First match	Last match	Starting round	Final position	Pld	W	D	L	GF	GA	GD	Win %
National Soccer League	3 April 1977	25 September 1977	Matchday 1	10th	26	8	6	12	30	35	−5	30.77
NSL Cup	21 September 1977	9 October 1977	First round	Winners	4	2	2	0	8	4	+4	50.00
Total					30	10	8	12	38	39	−1	33.33

Source: Competitions

=== National Soccer League ===
==== League table ====
Pos	Team	Pld	W	D	L	GF	GA	GD	Pts
8	Footscray JUST	26	9	6	11	36	39	−3	24
9	Brisbane Lions	26	9	5	12	27	41	−14	23
10	Brisbane City	26	8	6	12	30	35	−5	22
11	South Melbourne	26	7	8	11	27	35	−8	22
12	Sydney Olympic	26	7	7	12	25	38	−13	21

Source: rsssf.com
Rules for classification: 1) Points; 2) Goal difference; 3) Goals scored

==== Results summary ====
Overall								Home						Away					
Pld	W	D	L	GF	GA	GD	Pts	W	D	L	GF	GA	GD	W	D	L	GF	GA	GD
26	8	6	12	30	35	−5	30	6	3	4	16	10	+6	2	3	8	14	25	−11

Source: worldfootball.net

==== Results by round ====
Round	1	2	3	4	5	7	8	9	10	6	11	12	13	14	16	17	18	15	19	20	21	22	23	24	25	26
Ground	H	A	H	A	H	H	A	H	A	A	H	A	H	H	H	A	A	A	H	A	H	A	H	A	H	A
Result	L	L	D	W	W	W	L	L	L	D	D	L	W	D	W	L	D	L	W	L	L	D	W	L	L	W
Position	10	14	11	9	7	7	8	9	11	7	10	11	10	10	10	11	10	10	10	11	12	12	10	11	11	10
Points	0	0	1	3	5	7	7	7	7	8	9	9	11	12	14	14	15	15	17	17	17	18	20	20	20	22

Source: worldfootball.net
A = Away; H = Home; W = Win; D = Draw; L = Loss

==== Matches ====
Win Draw Loss

3 April 1977 1	Brisbane City	0–1	Marconi Fairfield	Brisbane
		Report	Sharne 83'	Stadium: Perry Park; Attendance: 5,214; Referee: Des Miles

11 April 1977 2	St George-Budapest	3–2	Brisbane City	Sydney
	Hensman 28'; Jankovics 29'; O'Connor 47'	Report	Herdle 67'; Johnston 75'	Stadium: Sydney Sports Ground; Attendance: 1,700; Referee: Brian Fowler

17 April 1977 3	Brisbane City	0–0	Eastern Suburbs	Brisbane
		Report		Stadium: Perry Park; Attendance: 6,322; Referee: Dave Nugent

23 April 1977 4	South Melbourne	0–1	Brisbane City	Melbourne
		Report	Pimblett 73'	Stadium: Middle Park Soccer Stadium; Attendance: 2,300; Referee: Bob Henderson

1 May 1977 5	Brisbane City	3–1	Mooroolbark	Brisbane
	Coyne 7'; Hermiston 13' (pen.); Gaffney 61'	Report	McGregor 87'	Stadium: Perry Park; Attendance: 6,514; Referee: Jack Wood

8 May 1977 7	Brisbane City	3–1	Brisbane Lions	Brisbane
	Hermiston 37' (pen.); Echeverria 71'; Johnston 87'	Report	Morris 77' (pen.)	Stadium: Perry Park; Attendance: 6,418; Referee: Dennis McDermott

21 May 1977 8	Canberra City	2–0	Brisbane City	Canberra
	O'Connor 8'; Henderson 48'	Report		Stadium: Manuka Oval; Attendance: 1,500; Referee: Richard Lorenc

29 May 1977 9	Brisbane City	0–1	Western Suburbs	Brisbane
		Report	Moores 10'	Stadium: Perry Park; Attendance: 5,103; Referee: Dave Nugent

4 June 1977 10	Sydney Olympic	4–0	Brisbane City	Sydney
	Botham 16', 60'; Pirie 72', 8'	Report		Stadium: Sydney Sports Ground; Attendance: 2,753; Referee: Tim Davies

10 June 1977 6	West Adelaide	3–3	Brisbane City	Adelaide
	Honeyman 12'; Boyle 28' (pen.); Kosmina 48'	Report	Hermiston 52' (pen.); Wallace 80', 84'	Stadium: Hindmarsh Stadium; Attendance: 4,000; Referee: Graham Neal

12 June 1977 11	Brisbane City	1–1	Fitzroy United	Brisbane
	Pimblett 86'	Report	Cole 20'	Stadium: Perry Park; Attendance: 4,723; Referee: Jack Wood

19 June 1977 12	Footscray JUST	2–1	Brisbane City	Melbourne
	Kondarios 39'; Kazi 49'	Report	Coyne 28'	Stadium: Middle Park Soccer Stadium; Attendance: 5,000; Referee: Jim Dixon

26 June 1977 13	Brisbane City	1–0	Adelaide City	Brisbane
	Gaffney 7'	Report		Stadium: Perry Park; Attendance: 6,249; Referee: Des Miles

3 July 1977 14	Brisbane City	1–1	St George-Budapest	Brisbane
	Pimblett 32'	Report	O'Connor 77'	Stadium: Perry Park; Attendance: 6,514; Referee: Dave Nugent

17 July 1977 16	Brisbane City	2–0	South Melbourne	Brisbane
	O'Connor 46'; Coyne 87'	Report		Stadium: Perry Park; Attendance: 5,187; Referee: Des Miles

23 July 1977 17	Eastern Suburbs	3–1	Brisbane City	Sydney
	Coyne 42' (o.g.); Watson 48'; Manecas 55'	Report	Wallace 84'	Stadium: Marconi Oval; Attendance: 5,482; Referee: Peter Rampley

30 July 1977 18	Mooroolbark	1–1	Brisbane City	Melbourne
	Fairbrother 75'	Report	Gaffney 31'	Stadium: Middle Park Soccer Stadium; Attendance: 3,000; Referee: Jim Dixon

5 August 1977 15	Marconi Fairfield	1–0	Brisbane City	Sydney
	Byrne 46'	Report		Stadium: Marconi Oval; Attendance: 2,784; Referee: Henry Witschge

7 August 1977 19	Brisbane City	1–0	West Adelaide	Brisbane
	Conner 85'	Report		Stadium: Perry Park; Attendance: 5,223; Referee: Jack Wood

14 August 1977 20	Brisbane Lions	2–1	Brisbane City	Brisbane
	Morris 30'; Laszlo 41'	Report	Tokesi 28'	Stadium: Perry Park; Attendance: 7,400; Referee: Tony Boskovic

21 August 1977 21	Brisbane City	0–1	Canberra City	Brisbane
		Report	Alston 87'	Stadium: Perry Park; Attendance: 4,328; Referee: Dieter Klose

28 August 1977 22	Western Suburbs	0–0	Brisbane City	Sydney
		Report		Stadium: Englefield Stadium; Attendance: 521; Referee: Henry Witschge

4 September 1977 23	Brisbane City	3–0	Sydney Olympic	Brisbane
	Conner 44'; Johnston 47'; Tokesi 60'	Report		Stadium: Perry Park; Attendance: 4,420; Referee: Jack Wood

11 September 1977 24	Fitzroy United	3–2	Brisbane City	Melbourne
	Bannon 58'; Cole 62', 66'	Report	Johnston 73'; Cole 78' (o.g.)	Stadium: Middle Park Soccer Stadium; Attendance: 4,200; Referee: Dennis Stanley

16 September 1977 25	Brisbane City	1–3	Footscray JUST	Brisbane
	Coyne 73'	Report	Vasic 35'; Ristovski 60'; Palinkas 85'	Stadium: Perry Park; Attendance: 3,870; Referee: Dave Nugent

25 September 1977 26	Adelaide City	1–2	Brisbane City	Adelaide
	Deans 55'	Report	Caldwell 39'; Conner 57'	Stadium: Olympic Sports Field; Attendance: 2,482; Referee: John Tattersall

=== NSL Cup ===
Win Draw Loss

21 September 1977 First round	Brisbane City	3–2	Brisbane Lions	Brisbane
	Echeverria 3'; Caldwell 49', 68'	Report	Spearritt 17'; Neale 75'	Stadium: Perry Park; Attendance: 4,000; Referee: Peter Rampley

2 October 1977 Quarter-finals	Brisbane City	1–1 (a.e.t.) (5–4 p)	Western Suburbs	Brisbane
	Johnston 5'	Report	Harding 55'	Stadium: Perry Park; Attendance: 4,000; Referee: David Yelland

5 October 1977 Semi-finals	Brisbane City	3–0 (a.e.t.)	West Adelaide	Brisbane
	Johnston 93'; Pimblett 102'; Kibbey 118'	Report		Stadium: Perry Park; Attendance: 5,000

9 October 1977 Final	Brisbane City	1–1 (a.e.t.) (5–3 p)	Marconi Fairfield	Brisbane
	Tokesi 60'	Report	Sharne 40'	Stadium: Perry Park; Attendance: 7,000; Referee: Stewart Mellings

== Statistics ==
=== Appearances and goals ===
Includes all competitions. Players with no appearances not included in the list.

No.	Pos.	Nat.	Player	National Soccer League		NSL Cup		Total	
No.	Pos.	Nat.	Player	Apps	Goals	Apps	Goals	Apps	Goals
—	GK	(Argentina)	Osvaldo Borzi	26	0	4	0	30	0
—	FW	(Australia)	Kevin Caldwell	15+9	1	4	2	28	3
—	FW	(Australia)	Willie Conner	17+8	4	4	0	29	4
—	FW	(Australia)	John Coyne	20+5	4	0+4	0	29	4
—	MF	(Australia)	Roberto Echeverria	23	1	4	1	27	2
—	MF	(Australia)	Larry Gaffney	26	3	4	0	30	3
—	—	(Australia)	Karl Herdle	4+4	1	0	0	8	1
—	DF	(Australia)	Jim Hermiston	20	3	4	0	24	3
—	FW	(Australia)	Ian Johnston	15	4	4	2	19	6
—	FW	(Australia)	Brian Kibbey	14+2	0	0+2	1	18	1
—	—	(Australia)	Ron Kidd	0+2	0	0	0	2	0
—	MF	(Scotland)	John Lavelle	12+1	0	0	0	13	0
—	MF	(Scotland)	Tom McLeod	3+4	0	4	0	11	0
—	DF	(Denmark)	Peter Neilson	2	0	0	0	2	0
—	—	(Australia)	Ian Perry	3	0	0	0	3	0
—	MF	(England)	Frank Pimblett	25+1	3	4	1	30	4
—	DF	(Scotland)	Ian Rathmell	26	0	4	0	30	0
—	DF	(Australia)	Peter Tokesi	26	2	4	1	30	3
—	FW	(Australia)	Craig Wallace	9+1	3	0	0	10	3

=== Disciplinary record ===
Includes all competitions. The list is sorted by squad number when total cards are equal. Players with no cards not included in the list.

Rank	No.	Pos.	Nat.	Player	National Soccer League			NSL Cup			Total		
Rank	No.	Pos.	Nat.	Player	Yellow card	Second yellow card	Red card	Yellow card	Second yellow card	Red card	Yellow card	Second yellow card	Red card
1	—	FW	(Australia)	Ian Johnston	2	0	0	1	0	0	3	0	0
1	—	DF	(Australia)	Peter Tokesi	2	0	0	1	0	0	3	0	0
3	—	MF	(Australia)	Roberto Echeverria	2	0	0	0	0	0	2	0	0
3	—	DF	(Scotland)	Ian Rathmell	1	0	0	1	0	0	2	0	0
5
5	—	FW	(Australia)	Kevin Caldwell	0	0	0	1	0	0	1	0	0
5	—	—	(Australia)	Karl Herdle	1	0	0	0	0	0	1	0	0
5	—	MF	(Scotland)	John Lavelle	1	0	0	0	0	0	1	0	0
5	—	FW	(Australia)	Craig Wallace	1	0	0	0	0	0	1	0	0
Total					10	0	0	4	0	0	14	0	0

=== Clean sheets ===
Includes all competitions. The list is sorted by squad number when total clean sheets are equal. Numbers in parentheses represent games where both goalkeepers participated and both kept a clean sheet; the number in parentheses is awarded to the goalkeeper who was substituted on, whilst a full clean sheet is awarded to the goalkeeper who was on the field at the start of play. Goalkeepers with no clean sheets not included in the list.

Rank	No.	Nat.	Goalkeeper	NSL	NSL Cup	Total
1	—	(Argentina)	Osvaldo Borzi	7	1	8
Total				7	1	8
