= 1977 Footscray JUST season =

Footscray JUST
1977 season
- Manager: Cedo Cirkovic
- Stadium: Middle Park; Olympic Park
- National Soccer League: 8th
- NSL Cup: First round
- Top goalscorer: League: Mendo Ristovski (8); All: Mendo Ristovski (8)
- Highest home attendance: 8,750 vs. South Melbourne (17 April 1977); National Soccer League
- Lowest home attendance: 1,000 vs. Brisbane Lions (6 August 1977); National Soccer League
- Average home league attendance: 3,875
- Biggest win: 3–0 vs. Canberra City (H) (15 May 1977); National Soccer League
- Biggest defeat: 1–4 vs. Adelaide City (A) (12 June 1977); National Soccer League

The 1977 season was the first in the National Soccer League for Footscray JUST. In addition to the domestic league, they also participated in the NSL Cup.

== Players ==
Note: Flags indicate national team as defined under FIFA eligibility rules; some limited exceptions apply. Players may hold more than one non-FIFA nationality.

No.	Pos.	Nation	Player
1	GK	SCO	Dennis Boland
2	DF	ENG	Alan Parrott
3	DF	AUS	Andy Kazi
4	DF	AUS	Jim Kriaris
5	DF	GRE	Jim Kondarios
7	FW	HUN	Joe Palinkas
8	MF	AUS	Frank Micic
9	MF	AUS	Josip Picioane
10	MF	AUS	Zoran Ilioski
11	FW	AUS	Mendo Ristovski

No.	Pos.	Nation	Player
12	MF	YUG	Mirko Rujevic
15	MF	YUG	Andrija Ristic
16		AUS	John Nicolaides
20	GK	AUS	Miro Litwin
—	FW	AUS	Steve Adamgikis
—	DF	YUG	Zdravko Borovnica
—	DF	AUS	Jim Milne
—	MF	YUG	Dragan Nikitovic
—	MF	SCO	Charles Smith
—	FW	YUG	Dragan Vasic

== Transfers ==
=== Transfers in ===
Date from	Position	Name	From	Fee	Ref.
26 January 1977	DF	Jim Milne	(Scotland) Arbroath	Free transfer	

== Pre-season and friendlies ==
Win Draw Loss

26–27 March 1977	Canberra City (Australia)	2–0	(Australia) Footscray JUST	Canberra
	Henderson 25'; Stoddart 39'			Stadium: Manuka Oval; Attendance: 200; Referee: Dennis McDermott

== Competitions ==
=== Overall record ===
Competition	First match	Last match	Starting round	Final position	Record							
Competition	First match	Last match	Starting round	Final position	Pld	W	D	L	GF	GA	GD	Win %
National Soccer League	2 April 1977	25 September 1977	Matchday 1	8th	26	9	6	11	36	39	−3	34.62
NSL Cup	22 September 1977		First round	First round	1	0	0	1	0	1	−1	0.00
Total					27	9	6	12	36	40	−4	33.33

Source: Competitions

=== National Soccer League ===
==== League table ====
Pos	Team	Pld	W	D	L	GF	GA	GD	Pts
6	St George-Budapest	26	7	14	5	39	35	+4	28
7	West Adelaide	26	8	10	8	38	32	+6	26
8	Footscray JUST	26	9	6	11	36	39	−3	24
9	Brisbane Lions	26	9	5	12	27	41	−14	23
10	Brisbane City	26	8	6	12	30	35	−5	22

Source: rsssf.com
Rules for classification: 1) Points; 2) Goal difference; 3) Goals scored

==== Results summary ====
Overall								Home						Away					
Pld	W	D	L	GF	GA	GD	Pts	W	D	L	GF	GA	GD	W	D	L	GF	GA	GD
26	9	6	11	36	39	−3	33	6	3	4	24	20	+4	3	3	7	12	19	−7

Source: worldfootball.net

==== Results by round ====
Round	1	2	3	4	5	7	8	9	10	11	12	13	14	6	15	16	17	18	19	20	21	22	23	24	25	26
Ground	H	A	H	A	H	H	A	H	A	A	H	A	H	A	A	H	A	A	H	A	H	A	H	H	A	H
Result	D	L	D	D	L	W	D	W	L	L	W	L	D	L	L	W	W	L	W	W	W	D	L	L	W	L
Position	6	9	9	8	11	11	11	10	10	11	10	11	11	11	11	11	10	11	9	8	8	7	8	8	8	8
Points	1	1	2	3	3	5	6	8	8	8	10	10	11	11	11	13	15	15	17	19	21	22	22	22	24	24

Source: worldfootball.net
A = Away; H = Home; W = Win; D = Draw; L = Loss

==== Matches ====
Win Draw Loss

2 April 1977 1	Footscray JUST	0–0	St George-Budapest	Melbourne
		Report		Stadium: Middle Park; Attendance: 3,500; Referee: David Yelland

10 April 1977 2	Eastern Suburbs	4–3	Footscray JUST	Sydney
	Muniz 19' (pen.); Barnes 50'; Smith 65'; Lutton 89'	Report	Ristovski 15', 67' (pen.); Kriaris 57'	Stadium: Sydney Sports Ground; Attendance: 1,500; Referee: Tim Davies

17 April 1977 3	Footscray JUST	2–2	South Melbourne	Melbourne
	Palinkas 16'; Kazi 69'	Report	Gibson 54'; French 87'	Stadium: Olympic Park; Attendance: 8,750; Referee: David Yelland

24 April 1977 4	Mooroolbark	2–2	Footscray JUST	Melbourne
	Bojczuk 25'; Tront 72' (pen.)	Report	Parrott 38'; Kondarios 47'	Stadium: Wembley Park; Attendance: 1,800; Referee: Jim Dixon

30 April 1977 5	Footscray JUST	0–1	West Adelaide	Melbourne
		Report	Kosmina 48'	Stadium: Middle Park; Attendance: 2,840; Referee: Chris Bambridge

15 May 1977 7	Footscray JUST	3–0	Canberra City	Melbourne
	Kondarios 46'; Picioane 47'; Palinkas 54'	Report		Stadium: Olympic Park; Attendance: 2,180; Referee: Stewart Mellings

21 May 1977 8	Western Suburbs	0–0	Footscray JUST	Sydney
		Report		Stadium: Sydney Sports Ground; Attendance: 1,754; Referee: Tim Davies

28 May 1977 9	Footscray JUST	1–0	Sydney Olympic	Melbourne
	Kondarios 81'	Report		Stadium: Middle Park; Attendance: 4,000; Referee: Bob Henderson

4 June 1977 10	Fitzroy United	2–0	Footscray JUST	Melbourne
	Campbell 15'; Kriaris 30' (o.g.)	Report		Stadium: Middle Park Soccer Stadium; Attendance: 5,500; Referee: Chris Bambridge

12 June 1977 11	Adelaide City	4–1	Footscray JUST	Adelaide
	Leane 25'; Marocchi 38'; Deans 49'; Nyskohus 55'	Report	Picioane 20'	Stadium: Olympic Sports Field; Attendance: 6,000; Referee: Dennis Stanley

19 June 1977 12	Footscray JUST	2–1	Brisbane City	Melbourne
	Kondarios 39'; Kazi 49'	Report	Coyne 28'	Stadium: Middle Park; Attendance: 5,000; Referee: Jim Dixon

26 June 1977 13	Marconi Fairfield	1–0	Footscray JUST	Sydney
	Milne 17' (o.g.)	Report		Stadium: Marconi Oval; Attendance: 5,200; Referee: Richard Lorenc

3 July 1977 14	Footscray JUST	2–2	Eastern Suburbs	Melbourne
	Ristovski 26'; Palinkas 34'	Report	Barnes 28', 38'	Stadium: Middle Park; Attendance: 1,500; Referee: Stewart Mellings

8 July 1977 6	Brisbane Lions	2–0	Footscray JUST	Brisbane
	Morris 63' (pen.); Neale 67'	Report		Stadium: Perry Park; Attendance: 2,500; Referee: Dave Nugent

10 July 1977 15	St George-Budapest	2–0	Footscray JUST	Sydney
	Gnavi 26'; Aitken 53'	Report		Stadium: Wentworth Park; Attendance: 5,334; Referee: Jim Dixon

17 July 1977 16	Footscray JUST	1–0	Mooroolbark	Melbourne
	Ontong 50' (o.g.)	Report		Stadium: Middle Park; Attendance: 7,500; Referee: David Yelland

24 July 1977 17	South Melbourne	0–2	Footscray JUST	Melbourne
		Report	Borovnica 38', 53'	Stadium: Middle Park; Attendance: 3,000; Referee: Chris Bambridge

31 July 1977 18	West Adelaide	1–0	Footscray JUST	Adelaide
	Kosmina 52'	Report		Stadium: Hindmarsh Stadium; Attendance: 4,246; Referee: J. Johnston

6 August 1977 19	Footscray JUST	4–2	Brisbane Lions	Melbourne
	Rujevic 21'; Palinkas 53'; Ristovski 63', 73'	Report	Laszlo 1'; Morris 28'	Stadium: Middle Park; Attendance: 1,000; Referee: Tony Beazleigh

13 August 1977 20	Canberra City	0–1	Footscray JUST	Canberra
	Ristovski 11'	Report		Stadium: Manuka Oval; Attendance: 1,200; Referee: John Tattersall

20 August 1977 21	Footscray JUST	2–1	Western Suburbs	Melbourne
	Palinkas 21'; Picioane 77'	Report	Noble 69'	Stadium: Middle Park; Attendance: 1,100; Referee: Chris Bambridge

28 August 1977 22	Sydney Olympic	0–0	Footscray JUST	Sydney
		Report		Stadium: Sydney Sports Ground; Attendance: 2,056; Referee: Bill Jones

4 September 1977 23	Footscray JUST	1–3	Fitzroy United	Melbourne
	Vasic 12'	Report	Bozikas 25'; Campbell 65'; P. Bannon 83'	Stadium: Olympic Park; Attendance: 6,500; Referee: Don Campbell

11 September 1977 24	Footscray JUST	3–4	Adelaide City	Melbourne
	Picioane 3'; Vasic 14'; Ristovski 77' (pen.)	Report	Deans 33', 73', 79' (pen.); Northcote 52'	Stadium: Olympic Park; Attendance: 2,500; Referee: Chris Bambridge

18 September 1977 25	Brisbane City	1–3	Footscray JUST	Brisbane
	Coyne 73'	Report	Vasic 35'; Ristovski 60'; Palinkas 85'	Stadium: Perry Park; Attendance: 3,870; Referee: Dave Nugent

25 September 1977 26	Footscray JUST	3–4	Marconi Fairfield	Melbourne
	Nicolaides 82'; Vasic 88'; Picioane 89'	Report	Sharne 35'; Rooney 38', 47'; Mariani 68'	Stadium: Middle Park; Attendance: 4,000; Referee: David Yelland

=== NSL Cup ===
Win Draw Loss

22 September 1977 First round	Fitzroy United	1–0	Footscray JUST	Melbourne
	Cole 61'	Report		Stadium: Olympic Park; Attendance: 4,000; Referee: Don Campbell

== Statistics ==
=== Appearances and goals ===
Includes all competitions. Players with no appearances not included in the list.

No.	Pos.	Nat.	Player	National Soccer League		NSL Cup		Total	
No.	Pos.	Nat.	Player	Apps	Goals	Apps	Goals	Apps	Goals
1	GK	(Scotland)	Dennis Boland	26	0	1	0	27	0
2	DF	(England)	Alan Parrott	17+2	1	1	0	20	1
3	DF	(Australia)	Andy Kazi	22	2	1	0	23	2
4	DF	(Australia)	Jim Kriaris	26	1	1	0	27	1
5	DF	(Greece)	Jim Kondarios	26	4	1	0	27	4
7	FW	(Hungary)	Joe Palinkas	26	6	1	0	27	6
8	MF	(Australia)	Frank Micic	16+3	0	0+1	0	20	0
9	MF	(Australia)	Josip Picioane	26	5	1	0	27	5
10	MF	(Australia)	Zoran Ilioski	17+2	0	0+1	0	20	0
11	FW	(Australia)	Mendo Ristovski	22	8	1	0	23	8
12	MF	(Socialist Federal Republic of Yugoslavia)	Mirko Rujevic	19+5	1	1	0	25	1
15	MF	(Socialist Federal Republic of Yugoslavia)	Andrija Ristic	5+2	0	0	0	7	0
16	—	(Australia)	John Nicolaides	6+4	1	1	0	11	1
20	GK	(Australia)	Miro Litwin	0+2	0	0	0	2	0
—	FW	(Australia)	Steve Adamgikis	0+6	0	0	0	6	0
—	DF	(Socialist Federal Republic of Yugoslavia)	Zdravko Borovnica	2	2	0	0	2	2
—	DF	(Australia)	Jim Milne	20	0	0	0	20	0
—	MF	(Socialist Federal Republic of Yugoslavia)	Dragan Nikitovic	2	0	0	0	2	0
—	MF	(Scotland)	Charles Smith	3+1	0	0	0	4	0
—	FW	(Socialist Federal Republic of Yugoslavia)	Dragan Vasic	5	4	1	0	6	4

=== Disciplinary record ===
Includes all competitions. The list is sorted by squad number when total cards are equal. Players with no cards not included in the list.

Rank	No.	Pos.	Nat.	Player	National Soccer League			NSL Cup			Total		
Rank	No.	Pos.	Nat.	Player	Yellow card	Second yellow card	Red card	Yellow card	Second yellow card	Red card	Yellow card	Second yellow card	Red card
1	12	MF	(Socialist Federal Republic of Yugoslavia)	Mirko Rujevic	3	0	0	0	0	0	3	0	0
2	4	DF	(Australia)	Jim Kriaris	1	0	0	0	0	0	1	0	0
2	5	DF	(Greece)	Jim Kondarios	1	0	0	0	0	0	1	0	0
2	8	MF	(Australia)	Frank Micic	1	0	0	0	0	0	1	0	0
2	11	FW	(Australia)	Mendo Ristovski	1	0	0	0	0	0	1	0	0
2	15	MF	(Socialist Federal Republic of Yugoslavia)	Andrija Ristic	1	0	0	0	0	0	1	0	0
2	16	—	(Australia)	John Nicolaides	1	0	0	0	0	0	1	0	0
2	—	MF	(Scotland)	Charles Smith	1	0	0	0	0	0	1	0	0
Total					10	0	0	0	0	0	10	0	0

=== Clean sheets ===
Includes all competitions. The list is sorted by squad number when total clean sheets are equal. Numbers in parentheses represent games where both goalkeepers participated and both kept a clean sheet; the number in parentheses is awarded to the goalkeeper who was substituted on, whilst a full clean sheet is awarded to the goalkeeper who was on the field at the start of play. Goalkeepers with no clean sheets not included in the list.

Rank	No.	Nat.	Goalkeeper	NSL	NSL Cup	Total
1	1	(Scotland)	Dennis Boland	7	0	7
Total				7	0	7
