= 1977 Sydney Olympic FC season =

Sydney Olympic
1977 season
- Head Coach: Bruce Stowell; Kaz Kulak
- Stadium: Sydney Sports Ground; Wentworth Park
- National Soccer League: 12th
- NSL Cup: First round
- Top goalscorer: League: Billy Pirie (7); All: Billy Pirie (7)
- Highest home attendance: 6,217 vs. West Adelaide (17 April 1977); National Soccer League
- Lowest home attendance: 1,025 vs. Adelaide City (14 August 1977); National Soccer League
- Average home league attendance: 3,724
- Biggest win: 4–0 vs. Brisbane City (H) (4 June 1977); National Soccer League
- Biggest defeat: 0–4 vs. West Adelaide (H) (17 April 1977); National Soccer League; 0–4 vs. Canberra City (A) (30 July 1977); National Soccer League
Home colours

The 1977 season was the first in the National Soccer League for Sydney Olympic Football Club. In addition to the domestic league, they also participated in the NSL Cup. Sydney Olympic finished 12th in their National Soccer League season, and were eliminated in the first round of the NSL Cup.

== Players ==
Note: Flags indicate national team as defined under FIFA eligibility rules; some limited exceptions apply. Players may hold more than one non-FIFA nationality.

No.	Pos.	Nation	Player
—	FW	AUS	Don Allan
—		AUS	Greg Allan
—	DF	AUS	Richard Bell
—	FW	ENG	Ray Botham
—	DF	ENG	Mike Cross
—		AUS	Bernie Cullerton
—		AUS	Michael Drossos
—	DF	SCO	George Gibson
—		AUS	Tony Ikonomou
—	FW	AUS	Jim Izatt
—	MF	SCO	Alex Jamieson
—		AUS	Bill Kardambis
—	DF	ENG	Paul Luckett

No.	Pos.	Nation	Player
—	FW	AUS	Greg Lynch
—		AUS	Neil Malone
—	DF	AUS	Dave McIntosh
—	GK	AUS	Gary Meier
—	DF	AUS	Billy Palmer
—		AUS	Lazaros Paraskevas
—	FW	AUS	Brian Parker
—	FW	SCO	Billy Pirie
—	MF	AUS	Peter Raskopoulos
—	MF	AUS	Joe Senkalski
—	FW	AUS	Chris Thamnidis
—	DF	SCO	Ken Wilson

== Transfers ==
=== Transfers in ===
Date from	Position	Name	From	Fee	Ref.
26 January 1977	MF	(Australia) Joe Senkalski	(Australia) Adamstown Rosebud	Free transfer	

== Competitions ==
=== Overall record ===
Competition	First match	Last match	Starting round	Final position	Record							
Competition	First match	Last match	Starting round	Final position	Pld	W	D	L	GF	GA	GD	Win %
National Soccer League	2 April 1977	25 September 1977	Matchday 1	12th	26	7	7	12	25	38	−13	26.92
NSL Cup	20 September 1977		First round	First round	1	0	0	1	1	2	−1	0.00
Total					27	7	7	13	26	40	−14	25.93

Source: Competitions

=== National Soccer League ===
==== League table ====
Pos	Team	Pld	W	D	L	GF	GA	GD	Pts	Relegation
10	Brisbane City	26	8	6	12	30	35	−5	22	
11	South Melbourne	26	7	8	11	27	35	−8	22	
12	Sydney Olympic	26	7	7	12	25	38	−13	21	
13	Canberra City	26	5	7	14	22	39	−17	17	
14	Mooroolbark (R)	26	5	5	16	31	61	−30	15	Relegation to the 1978 Victoria Metropolitan League Three

Source: rsssf.com
Rules for classification: 1) Points; 2) Goal difference; 3) Goals scored
(R) Relegated

==== Results summary ====
Overall								Home						Away					
Pld	W	D	L	GF	GA	GD	Pts	W	D	L	GF	GA	GD	W	D	L	GF	GA	GD
26	7	7	12	25	38	−13	28	5	3	5	16	17	−1	2	4	7	9	21	−12

Source: worldfootball.net

==== Results by round ====
Round	1	2	3	4	5	6	7	8	9	10	11	13	12	14	15	16	17	18	19	20	21	22	23	24	25	26
Ground	H	A	H	A	H	A	A	H	A	H	A	A	H	H	A	H	A	A	H	H	A	H	A	H	A	H
Result	L	D	L	W	D	W	L	W	L	W	D	L	W	L	D	W	L	L	L	W	L	D	L	L	D	D
Position	13	12	13	11	10	9	10	9	11	8	9	8	6	9	9	9	9	9	11	10	10	10	11	12	12	12
Points	0	1	1	3	4	6	6	8	8	10	11	11	13	13	14	16	16	16	16	18	18	19	19	19	20	21

Source: worldfootball.net
A = Away; H = Home; W = Win; D = Draw; L = Loss

==== Matches ====
Win Draw Loss

2 April 1977 1	Sydney Olympic	0–2	South Melbourne	Sydney
		Report	Ollerton 72', 85'	Stadium: Sydney Sports Ground; Attendance: 5,872; Referee: Tony Boskovic

10 April 1977 2	Mooroolbark	1–1	Sydney Olympic	Melbourne
	Tront 39' (pen.)	Report	Botham 28'	Stadium: Middle Park Soccer Stadium; Attendance: 2,100; Referee: Bob Henderson

17 April 1977 3	Sydney Olympic	0–4	West Adelaide	Sydney
		Report	Kosmina 42', 46'; McGregor 56'; Honeyman 87'	Stadium: Wentworth Park; Attendance: 6,217; Referee: Barry Wilkinson

24 April 1977 4	Brisbane Lions	0–2	Sydney Olympic	Brisbane
		Report	D. Allan 57', 68'	Stadium: Perry Park; Attendance: 5,111; Referee: Des Miles

1 May 1977 5	Sydney Olympic	2–2	Canberra City	Sydney
	D. Allan 3'; Botham 56'	Report	Stoddart 22'; Henderson 81'	Stadium: Wentworth Park; Attendance: 3,616; Referee: Brian Fowler

8 May 1977 6	Western Suburbs	0–2	Sydney Olympic	Sydney
		Report	Cross 15'; Pirie 34'	Stadium: Sydney Sports Ground; Attendance: 7,253; Referee: Bob Mee

15 May 1977 7	Adelaide City	3–0	Sydney Olympic	Adelaide
	Muniz 1'; Deans 21'; Northcote 32'	Report		Stadium: Olympic Sports Field; Attendance: 10,500; Referee: Don Campbell

22 May 1977 8	Sydney Olympic	3–1	Fitzroy United	Sydney
	Pirie 54', 81'; McIntosh 65'	Report	Buljevic 50'	Stadium: Wentworth Park; Attendance: 5,857; Referee: John van der Linde

28 May 1977 9	Footscray JUST	1–0	Sydney Olympic	Melbourne
	Kondarios 81'	Report		Stadium: Middle Park Soccer Stadium; Attendance: 4,000; Referee: Bob Henderson

4 June 1977 10	Sydney Olympic	4–0	Brisbane City	Sydney
	Botham 16', 60'; Pirie 72', 88'	Report		Stadium: Sydney Sports Ground; Attendance: 2,753; Referee: Tim Davies

12 June 1977 11	Marconi Fairfield	0–0	Sydney Olympic	Sydney
		Report		Stadium: Marconi Oval; Attendance: 9,580; Referee: Harold Hall

26 June 1977 13	Eastern Suburbs	2–0	Sydney Olympic	Sydney
	Barnes 6'; Smith 67'	Report		Stadium: Wentworth Park; Attendance: 6,115; Referee: Tony Boskovic

29 June 1977 12	Sydney Olympic	2–0	St George-Budapest	Sydney
	Cross 32'; Senkalski 60'	Report		Stadium: Sydney Sports Ground; Attendance: 2,923; Referee: Peter Rampley

3 July 1977 14	Sydney Olympic	1–2	Mooroolbark	Sydney
	Pirie 11' (pen.)	Report	P. Ontong 80', 84'	Stadium: Wentworth Park; Attendance: 4,982; Referee: Dennis McDermott

10 July 1977 15	South Melbourne	1–1	Sydney Olympic	Melbourne
	Mitten 46'	Report	Pirie 75'	Stadium: Middle Park Soccer Stadium; Attendance: 5,200; Referee: Jim Dixon

17 July 1977 16	Sydney Olympic	1–0	Brisbane Lions	Sydney
	Botham 55'	Report		Stadium: Sydney Sports Ground; Attendance: 3,470; Referee: Tony Boskovic

24 July 1977 17	West Adelaide	1–0	Sydney Olympic	Adelaide
	Kosmina 80'	Report		Stadium: Hindmarsh Stadium; Attendance: 4,125; Referee: Don Campbell

30 July 1977 18	Canberra City	4–0	Sydney Olympic	Canberra
	Grujicic 3'; Henderson 35'; Alston 81'; McIntosh 85' (o.g.)	Report		Stadium: Manuka Oval; Attendance: 1,500; Referee: Henry Witschge

7 August 1977 19	Sydney Olympic	0–3	Western Suburbs	Sydney
		Report	Curran 13'; Eaton 62', 83'	Stadium: Sydney Sports Ground; Attendance: 2,960; Referee: Richard Lorenc

14 August 1977 20	Sydney Olympic	3–1	Adelaide City	Sydney
	Senkalski 29'; McIntosh 34'; Botham 68'	Report	Deans 85'	Stadium: Sydney Sports Ground; Attendance: 1,025; Referee: Peter Rampley

21 August 1977 21	Fitzroy United	2–0	Sydney Olympic	Melbourne
	Taylor (?); Cole (?)	Report		Stadium: Olympic Park; Attendance: 3,000

28 August 1977 22	Sydney Olympic	0–0	Footscray JUST	Sydney
		Report		Stadium: Sydney Sports Ground; Attendance: 2,056; Referee: Bill Jones

4 September 1977 23	Brisbane City	3–0	Sydney Olympic	Brisbane
	Conner 44'; Johnston 47'; Tokesi 60'	Report		Stadium: Perry Park; Attendance: 4,420; Referee: Jack Wood

11 September 1977 24	Sydney Olympic	0–2	Marconi Fairfield	Sydney
		Report	Rooney 16'; Sharne 41'	Stadium: Sydney Sports Ground; Attendance: 3,691; Referee: Richard Lorenc

18 September 1977 25	St George-Budapest	3–3	Sydney Olympic	Sydney
	Mendez 27'; Hensman 51'; Morgan 90+2'	Report	Senkalski 22', 81' (pen.); McIntosh 76'	Stadium: Sydney Sports Ground; Attendance: 1,502; Referee: Dennis McDermott

25 September 1977 26	Sydney Olympic	0–0	Eastern Suburbs	Sydney
		Report		Stadium: Wentworth Park; Attendance: 2,987; Referee: Chris Bambridge

=== NSL Cup ===
Win Draw Loss

20 September 1977 First round	Western Suburbs	2–1	Sydney Olympic	Sydney
	Turnbull 31', 78'	Report	Jamieson 86'	Stadium: Marconi Oval; Attendance: 2,237; Referee: Tim Davies (Ray Sandell)

== Statistics ==
=== Appearances and goals ===
Includes all competitions. Players with no appearances not included in the list.

No.	Pos.	Nat.	Player	National Soccer League		NSL Cup		Total	
No.	Pos.	Nat.	Player	Apps	Goals	Apps	Goals	Apps	Goals
—	FW	(Australia)	Don Allan	20+1	3	0	0	21	3
—	—	(Australia)	Greg Allan	18+2	0	0	0	20	0
—	DF	(Australia)	Richard Bell	13	0	1	0	14	0
—	FW	(England)	Ray Botham	26	6	1	0	27	6
—	DF	(England)	Mike Cross	24+1	2	1	0	26	2
—	—	(Australia)	Bernie Cullerton	13	0	0	0	13	0
—	—	(Australia)	Michael Drossos	0+1	0	0	0	1	0
—	DF	(Scotland)	George Gibson	19	0	0	0	19	0
—	—	(Australia)	Tony Ikonomou	4+3	0	0	0	7	0
—	FW	(Australia)	Jim Izatt	0+1	0	0	0	1	0
—	MF	(Scotland)	Alex Jamieson	11	0	1	1	12	1
—	—	(Australia)	Bill Kardambis	0+4	0	0	0	4	0
—	DF	(England)	Paul Luckett	22+2	0	1	0	25	0
—	FW	(Australia)	Greg Lynch	5	0	0	0	5	0
—	—	(Australia)	Neil Malone	0+1	0	0	0	1	0
—	DF	(Australia)	Dave McIntosh	18	3	1	0	19	3
—	GK	(Australia)	Gary Meier	26	0	1	0	27	0
—	DF	(Australia)	Billy Palmer	12+2	0	1	0	15	0
—	—	(Australia)	Lazaros Paraskevas	0+3	0	0+1	0	4	0
—	FW	(Australia)	Brian Parker	2+1	0	0	0	3	0
—	FW	(Scotland)	Billy Pirie	8+1	7	0	0	9	7
—	MF	(Australia)	Peter Raskopoulos	7+1	0	1	0	9	0
—	MF	(Australia)	Joe Senkalski	25	4	1	0	26	4
—	FW	(Australia)	Chris Thamnidis	10+7	0	1	0	18	0
—	DF	(Scotland)	Ken Wilson	3+2	0	0+1	0	6	0

=== Disciplinary record ===
Includes all competitions. The list is sorted by squad number when total cards are equal. Players with no cards not included in the list.

Rank	No.	Pos.	Nat.	Player	National Soccer League			NSL Cup			Total		
Rank	No.	Pos.	Nat.	Player	Yellow card	Second yellow card	Red card	Yellow card	Second yellow card	Red card	Yellow card	Second yellow card	Red card
1	—	FW	(Australia)	Don Allan	3	0	1	0	0	0	3	0	1
2	—	FW	(Australia)	Chris Thamnidis	1	0	1	0	0	0	1	0	1
3	—	FW	(Australia)	Dave McIntosh	3	0	0	0	0	0	3	0	0
4	—	DF	(Australia)	Richard Bell	1	0	0	0	0	0	1	0	0
4	—	DF	(England)	Mike Cross	1	0	0	0	0	0	1	0	0
Total					9	0	2	0	0	0	9	0	2

=== Clean sheets ===
Includes all competitions. The list is sorted by squad number when total clean sheets are equal. Numbers in parentheses represent games where both goalkeepers participated and both kept a clean sheet; the number in parentheses is awarded to the goalkeeper who was substituted on, whilst a full clean sheet is awarded to the goalkeeper who was on the field at the start of play. Goalkeepers with no clean sheets not included in the list.

Rank	No.	Nat.	Goalkeeper	NSL	NSL Cup	Total
1	—	(Australia)	Gary Meier	8	0	8
Total				8	0	8
