= 1977 St George-Budapest FC season =

St George-Budapest
1977 season
- Head Coach: Manfred Schaefer; Ilija Takac
- Stadium: Sydney Sports Ground; Hurstville Oval; Wentworth Park
- National Soccer League: 6th
- NSL Cup: First round
- Top goalscorer: League: Neville Morgan; Phil O'Connor (8 each); All: Neville Morgan; Phil O'Connor (8 each)
- Highest home attendance: 5,482 vs. Marconi Fairfield (23 July 1977); National Soccer League
- Lowest home attendance: 620 vs. Mooroolbark (14 May 1977); National Soccer League
- Average home league attendance: 2,664
- Biggest win: 5–1 vs. Mooroolbark (H) (14 May 1977); National Soccer League
- Biggest defeat: 1–3 vs. Marconi Fairfield (A) (16 April 1977); National Soccer League; 0–2 vs. Adelaide City (A) (23 April 1977); National Soccer League; 0–2 vs. Sydney Olympic (A) (29 June 1977); National Soccer League

The 1977 season was the first in the National Soccer League for St George-Budapest (now St George Football Club). In addition to the domestic league, they also participated in the NSL Cup. St George-Budapest finished 6th in their National Soccer League season, and were eliminated in the first round of the NSL Cup.

== Players ==
Note: Flags indicate national team as defined under FIFA eligibility rules; some limited exceptions apply. Players may hold more than one non-FIFA nationality.

No.	Pos.	Nation	Player
1	GK	AUS	Martin Coe
2	DF	AUS	George Harris (captain)
3	DF	ENG	Paul Cotton
4	DF	AUS	John O'Shea
5	DF	AUS	Harry Williams
6	MF	AUS	Brendan Grosse
7	FW	ENG	Charlie George
8	FW	AUS	Mark Jankovics
9	FW	AUS	Neville Morgan
10	MF	AUS	Rudolfo Gnavi
11	FW	AUS	Phil O'Connor

No.	Pos.	Nation	Player
12	FW	SCO	Fred Aitken
13	DF	AUS	Robert O'Shea
15	FW	ENG	Peter Hensman
16	DF	AUS	Doug Utjesenovic
18	MF	SCO	Willie Hamilton
19	DF	AUS	Peter Terry
20	GK	AUS	Dave McQuire
—	MF	AUS	Roberto Echeverria
—		AUS	Emery Holmik
—		AUS	Carlos Mendez
—	DF	AUS	Mike O'Shea

== Transfers ==
=== Transfers in ===
Date	Position	Name	From	Fee	Ref.
26 January 1977	GK	Dave McQuire	(Australia) APIA Leichhardt	$1,500	
26 January 1977	FW	Phil O'Connor	(Australia) Wollongong City	Free transfer	

=== Transfers out ===
Date	Position	Name	To	Fee	Ref.
10–16 January 1977	FW	Attila Abonyi	(Australia) Sydney Croatia	$8,000	
10–16 January 1977	FW	Jimmy Rooney	Marconi Fairfield	$20,000	

== Competitions ==
=== Overall record ===
Competition	First match	Last match	Starting round	Final position	Record							
Competition	First match	Last match	Starting round	Final position	Pld	W	D	L	GF	GA	GD	Win %
National Soccer League	2 April 1977	24 September 1977	Matchday 1	6th	26	7	14	5	39	35	+4	26.92
NSL Cup	22 September 1977		First round	First round	1	0	0	1	1	2	−1	0.00
Total					27	7	14	6	40	37	+3	25.93

Source: Competitions

=== National Soccer League ===
==== League table ====
Pos	Team	Pld	W	D	L	GF	GA	GD	Pts
4	Adelaide City	26	12	7	7	50	31	+19	31
5	Western Suburbs	26	11	7	8	38	29	+9	29
6	St George-Budapest	26	7	14	5	39	35	+4	28
7	West Adelaide	26	8	10	8	38	32	+6	26
8	Footscray JUST	26	9	6	11	36	39	−3	24

Source: rsssf.com
Rules for classification: 1) Points; 2) Goal difference; 3) Goals scored

==== Results summary ====
Overall								Home						Away					
Pld	W	D	L	GF	GA	GD	Pts	W	D	L	GF	GA	GD	W	D	L	GF	GA	GD
26	7	14	5	39	35	+4	35	5	6	2	22	16	+6	2	8	3	17	19	−2

Source: worldfootball.net

==== Results by round ====
Round	1	2	3	4	5	7	8	9	10	11	6	13	12	14	15	16	17	18	19	20	21	22	23	24	25	26
Ground	A	H	H	H	H	H	A	H	A	H	A	H	A	A	H	A	H	A	H	A	H	A	H	A	H	A
Result	D	W	L	L	D	W	D	D	D	D	W	D	L	D	W	D	D	D	D	L	W	D	W	L	D	W
Position	6	5	8	10	9	8	6	6	7	7	8	7	8	8	7	6	7	6	7	7	6	6	6	6	6	6
Points	1	3	3	3	4	6	7	8	9	10	12	13	13	14	16	17	18	19	20	20	22	23	25	25	26	28

Source: worldfootball.net
A = Away; H = Home; W = Win; D = Draw; L = Loss

==== Matches ====
Win Draw Loss

2 April 1977 1	Footscray JUST	0–0	St George-Budapest	Melbourne
		Report		Stadium: Middle Park; Attendance: 3,500; Referee: David Yelland

11 April 1977 2	St George-Budapest	3–2	Brisbane City	Sydney
	Hensman 28'; Jankovics 29'; O'Connor 47'	Report	Herdle 67'; Johnston 75'	Stadium: Sydney Sports Ground; Attendance: 1,700; Referee: Brian Fowler

16 April 1977 3	St George-Budapest	1–3	Marconi Fairfield	Sydney
	R. O'Shea 29'	Report	Campbell 15'; Robertson 20'; Byrne 73' (pen.)	Stadium: Sydney Sports Ground; Attendance: 3,500; Referee: Harold Hall

23 April 1977 4	St George-Budapest	0–2	Adelaide City	Sydney
		Report	Nyskohus 54'; Northcote 63'	Stadium: Sydney Sports Ground; Attendance: 1,338; Referee: Tony Boskovic

1 May 1977 5	St George-Budapest	1–1	Eastern Suburbs	Sydney
	Morgan 37'	Report	Smith 66'	Stadium: Sydney Sports Ground; Attendance: 1,763; Referee: Bill Jones

14 May 1977 7	St George-Budapest	5–1	Mooroolbark	Sydney
	R. O'Shea 5'; O'Connor 26', 51'; J. O'Shea 44'; Morgan 70'	Report	Tront 28' (pen.)	Stadium: Sydney Sports Ground; Attendance: 620; Referee: Peter Rampley

22 May 1977 8	West Adelaide	3–3	St George-Budapest	Adelaide
	Kosmina 4', 49'; de Lyster 13'	Report	R. O'Shea 25'; Aitken 27', 86'	Stadium: Hindmarsh Stadium; Attendance: 7,520; Referee: Dennis Stanley

29 May 1977 9	St George-Budapest	0–0	Brisbane Lions	Sydney
		Report		Stadium: Sydney Sports Ground; Attendance: 3,164; Referee: Barry Wilkinson

4 June 1977 10	Canberra City	2–2	St George-Budapest	Canberra
	B. Stoddart 15'; Grujicic 21'	Report	O'Connor 25'; O'Shea 53'	Stadium: Manuka Oval; Attendance: 2,500; Referee: Tony Boskovic

11 June 1977 11	St George-Budapest	1–1	Western Suburbs	Sydney
	Jankovics 86'	Report	Moores 8'	Stadium: Sydney Sports Ground; Attendance: 2,763; Referee: Richard Lorenc

13 June 1977 6	South Melbourne	2–3	St George-Budapest	Melbourne
	Macdonald 45', 84'	Report	Gnavi 2'; George 22'; Jankovics 56'	Stadium: Middle Park Soccer Stadium; Attendance: 15,000; Referee: Stewart Mellings

26 June 1977 13	St George-Budapest	2–2	Fitzroy United	Sydney
	Cotton 53'; Jankovics 77'	Report	Buljevic 56'; Campbell 57'	Stadium: Hurstville Oval; Attendance: 2,357; Referee: Brian Fowler

29 June 1977 12	Sydney Olympic	2–0	St George-Budapest	Sydney
	Cross 32'; Senkalski 60'	Report		Stadium: Sydney Sports Ground; Attendance: 2,923; Referee: Peter Rampley

3 July 1977 14	Brisbane City	1–1	St George-Budapest	Brisbane
	Pimblett 32'	Report	O'Connor 77'	Stadium: Perry Park; Attendance: 6,514; Referee: Dave Nugent

10 July 1977 15	St George-Budapest	2–0	Footscray JUST	Sydney
	Gnavi 26'; Aitken 53'	Report		Stadium: Wentworth Park; Attendance: 5,334; Referee: Jim Dixon

17 July 1977 16	Adelaide City	1–1	St George-Budapest	Adelaide
	Northcote 31'	Report	O'Connor 52'	Stadium: Olympic Sports Field; Attendance: 6,200; Referee: Graham Neal

23 July 1977 17	St George-Budapest	0–0	Marconi Fairfield	Sydney
		Report		Stadium: Marconi Oval; Attendance: 5,482; Referee: Richard Lorenc

31 July 1977 18	Eastern Suburbs	2–2	St George-Budapest	Sydney
	Manecas 5'; Barnes 14'	Report	Morgan 32'; O'Connor 34'	Stadium: Wentworth Park; Attendance: 2,033; Referee: John Yattersall

7 August 1977 19	St George-Budapest	1–1	South Melbourne	Sydney
	Morgan 8'	Report	Ollerton 51'	Stadium: Marconi Oval; Attendance: 3,456; Referee: Barry Wilkinson

13 August 1977 20	Mooroolbark	1–0	St George-Budapest	Melbourne
	McGregor 33'	Report		Stadium: Esther Park; Attendance: 800; Referee: Nick Karlich

21 August 1977 21	St George-Budapest	1–0	West Adelaide	Sydney
	Morgan 15'	Report		Stadium: Wentworth Park; Attendance: 2,117; Referee: Brian Fowler

28 August 1977 22	Brisbane Lions	1–1	St George-Budapest	Brisbane
	Laszlo 77'	Report	Morgan 87'	Stadium: Perry Park; Attendance: 3,835; Referee: Dave Nugent (Ron Richmond 75')

4 September 1977 23	St George-Budapest	2–0	Canberra City	Sydney
	O'Conner 17'; Hensman 40'	Report		Stadium: Wentworth Park; Attendance: 2,205; Referee: Peter Rampley

11 September 1977 24	Western Suburbs	3–2	St George-Budapest	Sydney
	Norris 6'; C. Eaton 18'; Harding 45'	Report	Hamilton 56', 73'	Stadium: Englefield Stadium; Attendance: 780; Referee: Barry Wilkinson

18 September 1977 25	St George-Budapest	3–3	Sydney Olympic	Sydney
	Mendez 27'; Hensman 51'; Morgan 90+2'	Report	Senkalski 22', 81' (pen.); McIntosh 76'	Stadium: Sydney Sports Ground; Attendance: 1,502; Referee: Dennis McDermott

24 September 1977 26	Fitzroy United	1–2	St George-Budapest	Melbourne
	Bozikas 8'	Report	Williams 40'; Morgan 51'	Stadium: Middle Park; Attendance: 2,000; Referee: Tony Beazleigh

=== NSL Cup ===
Win Draw Loss

21 September 1977 First round	Canberra City	2–1	St George-Budapest	Canberra
	Alston 2'; Bourke 81'	Report	Jankovics 90+1'	Stadium: Manuka Oval; Attendance: 1,000; Referee: Dennis McDermott

== Statistics ==
=== Appearances and goals ===
Includes all competitions. Players with no appearances not included in the list.

No.	Pos.	Nat.	Player	National Soccer League		NSL Cup		Total	
No.	Pos.	Nat.	Player	Apps	Goals	Apps	Goals	Apps	Goals
1	GK	(Australia)	Martin Coe	17	0	1	0	18	0
2	DF	(Australia)	George Harris	23	0	0	0	23	0
3	DF	(England)	Paul Cotton	13	1	0	0	13	1
4	DF	(Australia)	John O'Shea	26	1	0	0	26	1
5	DF	(Australia)	Harry Williams	19+2	1	1	0	22	1
6	MF	(Australia)	Brendan Grosse	23+2	0	1	0	26	0
7	FW	(England)	Charlie George	5+1	1	0	0	6	1
8	FW	(Australia)	Mark Jankovics	24	4	0+1	1	25	5
9	FW	(Australia)	Neville Morgan	17+6	8	1	0	24	8
10	MF	(Australia)	Rudolfo Gnavi	23+2	2	1	0	26	2
11	FW	(Australia)	Phil O'Connor	23+2	8	1	0	26	8
12	FW	(Scotland)	Fred Aitken	11+6	3	0	0	17	3
13	DF	(Australia)	Robert O'Shea	23	4	1	0	24	4
15	FW	(England)	Peter Hensman	6+5	3	1	0	12	3
16	DF	(Australia)	Doug Utjesenovic	7+2	0	1	0	10	0
18	MF	(Australia)	Willie Hamilton	8+2	2	1	0	11	2
19	DF	(Australia)	Peter Terry	4	0	0	0	4	0
20	GK	(Australia)	Dave McQuire	9	0	0	0	9	0
—	MF	(Australia)	Roberto Echeverria	1	0	0	0	1	0
—	—	(Australia)	Emery Holmik	2+1	0	0	0	3	0
—	—	(Australia)	Carlos Mendez	2+1	1	1	0	4	1
—	DF	(Australia)	Mike O'Shea	0+1	0	0	0	1	0

=== Disciplinary record ===
Includes all competitions. The list is sorted by squad number when total cards are equal. Players with no cards not included in the list.

Rank	No.	Pos.	Nat.	Player	National Soccer League			NSL Cup			Total		
Rank	No.	Pos.	Nat.	Player	Yellow card	Second yellow card	Red card	Yellow card	Second yellow card	Red card	Yellow card	Second yellow card	Red card
1	5	DF	(Australia)	Harry Williams	3	0	0	0	0	0	3	0	0
1	6	MF	(Australia)	Brendan Grosse	3	0	0	0	0	0	3	0	0
1	10	MF	(Australia)	Rudolfo Gnavi	3	0	0	0	0	0	3	0	0
4	2	DF	(Australia)	George Harris	2	0	0	0	0	0	2	0	0
5	1	GK	(Australia)	Martin Coe	1	0	0	0	0	0	1	0	0
5	11	FW	(Australia)	Phil O'Connor	1	0	0	0	0	0	1	0	0
5	15	FW	(England)	Peter Hensman	1	0	0	0	0	0	1	0	0
Total					14	0	0	0	0	0	14	0	0

=== Clean sheets ===
Includes all competitions. The list is sorted by squad number when total clean sheets are equal. Numbers in parentheses represent games where both goalkeepers participated and both kept a clean sheet; the number in parentheses is awarded to the goalkeeper who was substituted on, whilst a full clean sheet is awarded to the goalkeeper who was on the field at the start of play. Goalkeepers with no clean sheets not included in the list.

Rank	No.	Nat.	Goalkeeper	NSL	NSL Cup	Total
1	1	(Australia)	Martin Coe	5	0	5
2	20	(Australia)	Dave McQuire	1	0	1
Total				6	0	6
