= Adelaide City FC 10–3 Mooroolbark SC =

1977 soccer match in Australia

Adelaide City 10–3 Mooroolbark
- Event: 1977 National Soccer League
| Adelaide City | Mooroolbark |
| 10 | 3 |
- Date: 4 September 1977
- Venue: Olympic Sports Field, Adelaide
- Attendance: 4,700

The 1977 National Soccer League match between Adelaide City and Mooroolbark at Olympic Sports Field, Adelaide, took place on Sunday, 4 September 1977. Adelaide won the match 10–3 for the highest-scoring match in the history of Australian top-flight soccer.

== Background ==
Adelaide started the match in fourth with 37 points, with Mooroolbark in last place in relegation zone with 14 points.

== Match ==
4 September 1977

| Adelaide City | 10–3 | Mooroolbark |
|---|---|---|
| Perin 25', 69'; Northcote 84'; Deans 9', 46', 53', 57'; Marocchi 72'; Leane 59'; Nyskohus 64' | | Lowe 89'; Fairbrother 43'; McGregor 82' |

Olympic Sports Field
Attendance: 4,700

| GK | (Australia) Peter Marshall |
| DF | (Australia) Fred Yung |
| DF | (Australia) Bugsy Nyskohus |
| DF | (Australia) Don Fraser |
| DF | (Socialist Federal Republic of Yugoslavia) Zoran Matic |
| MF | (Australia) John Perin |
| MF | (Australia) Brian Northcote |
| MF | (Scotland) Dixie Deans |
| FW | (Australia) Gary Marocchi |
| FW | (Australia) David Leane |
| FW | (Australia) John Nyskohus |
Substitutes:
| | (Australia) John Besir |

| GK | (Australia) Terence Hawke (substituted off) |
| DF | (South Africa) Geoff Ontong |
| DF | (Scotland) Walter Bojczuk |
| DF | (Australia) Ian Williamson |
| DF | (Australia) Alan Pongho |
| MF | (Australia) Brian Thorn |
| MF | (Australia) Nick Lowe |
| MF | (South Africa) Paul Ontong |
| FW | (England) Barrie Fairbrother |
| FW | (Scotland) Gordon McGregor |
| FW | (Australia) Paul O'Reilly |
Substitutes:
| GK | (Australia) Paul Wilding (substituted on) |
| | (Australia) David Ellis |
