= Pat Lowrey =

English footballer

Pat Lowrey "Paddy"
Personal information
- Full name: Patrick Lowrey
- Date of birth: 11 October 1950 (age 76)
- Place of birth: Newcastle, England
- Height: 5 ft 8 in (1.73 m)
- Position: Forward

Senior career*
Years	Team	Apps	(Gls)
1966–1967	Newcastle United	0	(0)
1967–1972	Sunderland	15	(3)
1972–1975	Royale Union Saint-Gilloise	71	(14)
1975–1976	Darlington	20	(2)
1976–1977	Workington	15	(3)
1977	Western Suburbs	6	(1)
1977	Mooroolbark	17	(4)
1978–1979	Croydon City	31	(16)
- * Club domestic league appearances and goals

Patrick Lowrey (born 11 October 1950) was an English professional footballer who played as a forward for Sunderland. winning the FA youth cup with them in 1969 and scoring a hat trick in the second leg of the Final verses West Bromwich Albion in the process. Paddy signed apprentice professional forms for Newcastle United aged 15 on 27 May 1966 just hours after having left Rutherford Grammar school. United scouts Temple Lisle and Tommy Jordan had to fight off West Bromwich Albion, Chelsea, Sheffield United, Sunderland, Leeds United, Coventry, Birmingham Preston and Blackburn to land Lowrey

Lowrey played in the Australian National Soccer League in the 1977 season for Mooroolbark and Western Suburbs.
