= Roger Romanowicz =

German-born Australian soccer player

Roger Romanowicz (born 23 May 1947) is an Australian former soccer player who played as a goalkeeper.

== Early life ==
Romanowicz was born in 1947 in Germany, arriving in Australia when he was three years old.

== Club career ==
Romanowicz played for Adelaide Polonia in the South Australian Premier League before playing for Adelaide City in the 1977 National Soccer League season.

== International career ==
Romanowicz played his first full international match for Australia in November 1967 against New Zealand in Saigon. He played two more matches in the same month, the last against Indonesia in Jakarta.
