= Ted de Lyster =

Australian soccer player (born 1947)

Personal information
- Date of birth: 17 June 1947 (age 79)
- Position: Forward

Senior career*
Years	Team	Apps	(Gls)
1966–1977	West Adelaide SC		

International career
1967	Australia MNT	2	(0)
- * Club domestic league appearances and goals

Ted de Lyster (born 17 June 1947) is an Australian former association football player.

== Playing career ==
=== Club career ===
De Lyster played for South Australian teams Campbelltown and West Adelaide Hellas.

=== International career ===
He made his full international debut for Australia in November 1967 in a match against Indonesia in Jakarta. He played his second and final match against Singapore in the same month. He also played two further matches that were considered B-internationals against a Jakarta XI and a Combined Services XI.
