= Geoff Morris (footballer, born 1949) =

English footballer

Personal information
- Full name: Geoffrey Morris
- Date of birth: 8 February 1949
- Place of birth: West Bromwich, England
- Date of death: 16 February 2015 (aged 66)
- Height: 5 ft 5 in (1.65 m)
- Position: Left winger

Youth career
- 1964–1965: Walsall

Senior career*
Years	Team	Apps	(Gls)
1965–1973	Walsall	178	(35)
1973–1975	Shrewsbury Town	75	(9)
1975	Bangor City		
1975–1976	Port Vale	15	(1)
1976–1977	Kidderminster Harriers		
1977–1978	Brisbane Lions		
Total		267	(45)
- * Club domestic league appearances and goals

Geoffrey Morris (8 February 1949 – 16 February 2015) was an English footballer who played for Walsall, Shrewsbury Town, Bangor City, Port Vale, Kidderminster Harriers, and Brisbane Lions (Australia). A winger, he scored 58 goals in 305 league games in an 11-year career in the Football League. He won promotion out of the Fourth Division with Shrewsbury Town in 1974–75.

== Career ==
Born at Great Barr, West Bromwich, Morris began his career in 1964 at Walsall, who finished ninth in the Third Division in 1965–66 under the stewardship of Ray Shaw. He became the youngest player in the club's history when he made his debut against Peterborough United in September 1965, aged 16 years and 218 days. The "Saddlers" then finished 12th in 1966–67 and seventh in 1967–68. New boss Bill Moore took the club to 13th in 1968–69, 12th in 1969–70, 20th in 1970–71, and ninth in 1971–72. Morris left the club after a 17th-place finish in 1972–73. He scored 35 goals in 177 league games at Fellows Park.

He moved on to Maurice Evans's Shrewsbury Town, who were relegated into the Fourth Division in 1973–74, in exchange for George Andrews and £6,000. The "Shrews" then won immediate promotion with a second-place finish in 1974–75 under the stewardship of rookie manager Alan Durban. He scored nine goals in 75 league games at Gay Meadow.

He spent time in the Northern Premier League with Bangor City before he was signed by Port Vale manager Roy Sproson for a £200 fee in August 1975. He was unable to make an impact for the "Valiants" in the 1975–76 season, making 15 Third Division and two FA Cup appearances, scoring one goal in a 1–1 draw with Brighton & Hove Albion at Vale Park on 6 September.

He was given a free transfer in May 1976 and moved on to Kidderminster Harriers. He helped Harriers to an eighth-place finish in Division One North of the Southern League in 1976–77.

He left Aggborough and moved to Australia to score 13 goals in 38 National Soccer League games for Brisbane Lions in 1977 and 1978.

== Later life ==
Morris died on 16 February 2015 at the Royal Shrewsbury Hospital after a short illness, aged 66. His funeral took place at Shrewsbury Crematorium on 5 March.

== Career statistics ==
Appearances and goals by club, season and competition
Club	Season	League			FA Cup		League Cup		Total	
Club	Season	Division	Apps	Goals	Apps	Goals	Apps	Goals	Apps	Goals
Walsall	1965–66	Third Division	1	0	0	0	0	0	1	0
Walsall	1966–67	Third Division	1	0	0	0	0	0	1	0
Walsall	1967–68	Third Division	12	3	0	0	0	0	12	3
Walsall	1968–69	Third Division	34	9	4	0	3	0	41	9
Walsall	1969–70	Third Division	33	2	3	0	1	0	37	2
Walsall	1970–71	Third Division	37	7	2	2	2	0	41	7
Walsall	1971–72	Third Division	42	11	4	1	1	0	47	12
Walsall	1972–73	Third Division	18	3	3	3	1	0	22	6
Walsall	Total		178	35	16	6	8	0	202	41
Shrewsbury Town	1972–73	Third Division	20	2	0	0	0	0	20	2
Shrewsbury Town	1973–74	Third Division	26	3	2	0	1	1	29	4
Shrewsbury Town	1974–75	Fourth Division	29	4	2	0	2	0	33	4
Shrewsbury Town	Total		75	9	4	0	3	1	82	10
Port Vale	1975–76	Third Division	15	1	0	0	2	0	17	1
Career total			268	45	20	6	13	1	301	52

== Honours ==
Shrewsbury Town

- Football League Fourth Division second-place promotion: 1974–75
