= Barrie Fairbrother =

English footballer (born 1950)

Personal information
- Full name: Barrie Edward Fairbrother
- Date of birth: 30 December 1950 (age 75)
- Place of birth: Hackney, London, England
- Position: Forward

Senior career*
Years	Team	Apps	(Gls)
1969–1975	Orient	188	(41)
1975–1977	Millwall	15	(1)
1977	Mooroolbark	12	(3)
1978–1979	Brisbane Lions	35	(8)
Total		250	(53)
- * Club domestic league appearances and goals

Barrie Edward Fairbrother (born 30 December 1950 in Hackney, London, England), is an English footballer who played as a forward for Orient and Millwall in the Football League before moving to Australia where he played for Mooroolbark and Brisbane Lions.
