= 1977 in Australian soccer =

Soccer in Australia
- Season: 1977

Men's soccer
- National Soccer League: Sydney City
- NSL Cup: Brisbane City

The 1977 season was the eighth national competitive soccer in Australia season and 94th overall.

== National teams ==
=== Men's senior ===
==== Results and fixtures ====
===== Friendlies =====
| 12 February 1977 | Australia | 1–1 | Israel | Melbourne, Australia |
| | Ollerton 58' | Report | Damti 10' | Stadium: Olympic Park Stadium; Attendance: 8,000; Referee: Barry Harwood (Australia) |

| 16 February 1977 | Australia | 1–1 | Israel | Sydney, Australia |
| | Muniz 59' | Report | Schweitzer 72' | Stadium: Sydney Sports Ground; Attendance: 6,900; Referee: Des Miles (Australia) |

| 19 March 1977 | Fiji | 1–0 | Australia | Suva, Fiji |
| | Okete 75' | Report | | Referee: Bob Khan (Fiji) |

| 13 November 1977 | Singapore | 0–2 | Australia | Singapore |
| | | Report | Ollerton ?'; Abonyi ?' |

===== 1978 FIFA World Cup qualification =====
====== Group 5 ======
| Pos | Team | Pld | W | D | L | GF | GA | GD | Pts | Qualification |
|---|---|---|---|---|---|---|---|---|---|---|
| 1 | Australia | 4 | 3 | 1 | 0 | 9 | 3 | +6 | 7 | Advance to Final round |
| 2 | New Zealand | 4 | 2 | 1 | 1 | 14 | 4 | +10 | 5 | |
| 3 | Taiwan | 4 | 0 | 0 | 4 | 1 | 17 | −16 | 0 | |

Source: RSSSF

| 13 March 1977 | Australia | 3–0 | Taiwan | Ba, Fiji |
| | Rooney 8', 46'; Abonyi 16' | Report | | Attendance: 8,000; Referee: P. Watana (Thailand) |

| 16 March 1977 | Taiwan | 1–2 | Australia | Ba, Fiji |
| | Fang 29' | Report | Kosmina 35'; Abonyi 58' | Referee: G. Vijit (Thailand) |

| 27 March 1977 | Australia | 3–1 | New Zealand | Sydney, Australia |
| | Ollerton 60', 85'; Kosmina 72' | Report | Nelson 4' | Stadium: Sydney Cricket Ground; Referee: Cham Tan-sun (Hong Kong) |

| 30 March 1977 | New Zealand | 1–1 | Australia | Auckland, New Zealand |
| | Nelson ?' | Report | Ollerton 18' | Stadium: Newmarket Park; Attendance: 11,000; Referee: Cheung Kwok-kui (Hong Kong) |

====== Final round ======
| Pos | Team | Pld | W | D | L | GF | GA | GD | Pts | Qualification | | South Korea | Kuwait | Australia | Hong Kong 1959 |
|---|---|---|---|---|---|---|---|---|---|---|---|---|---|---|---|
| 1 | Iran | 8 | 6 | 2 | 0 | 12 | 3 | +9 | 14 | Qualification for 1978 FIFA World Cup | — | 2–2 | 1–0 | 1–0 | 3–0 |
| 2 | South Korea | 8 | 3 | 4 | 1 | 12 | 8 | +4 | 10 | | 0–0 | — | 1–0 | 0–0 | 5–2 |
| 3 | Kuwait | 8 | 4 | 1 | 3 | 13 | 8 | +5 | 9 | | 1–2 | 2–2 | — | 1–0 | 4–0 |
| 4 | Australia | 8 | 3 | 1 | 4 | 11 | 8 | +3 | 7 | | 0–1 | 2–1 | 1–2 | — | 3–0 |
| 5 | Hong Kong | 8 | 0 | 0 | 8 | 5 | 26 | −21 | 0 | | 0–2 | 0–1 | 1–3 | 2–5 | — |

Source: RSSSF

| 10 July 1977 | Australia | 3–0 | Hong Kong | Adelaide, Australia |
| | Kosmina 27', 84'; Barnes 46' | Report | | Attendance: 8,000; Referee: W. Hungerbuehler (Switzerland) |

| 14 August 1977 | Australia | 0–1 | Iran | Melbourne, Australia |
| | | Report | Rowshan 68' | Stadium: Olympic Park Stadium; Attendance: 17,000; Referee: Franz Wohrer (Austria) |

| 28 August 1977 | Australia | 2–1 | South Korea | Sydney, Australia |
| | Kosmina 63', 75' | Report | Cha 23' | Stadium: Sydney Sports Ground; Attendance: 9,000; Referee: Franz Wohrer (Netherlands) |

| 16 October 1977 | Australia | 1–2 | Kuwait | Sydney, Australia |
| | Rooney 40' | Report | Kamil 41' (pen.); Aziz 49' | Stadium: Sydney Sports Ground; Referee: Franz Wohrer (France) |

| 23 October 1977 | South Korea | 0–0 | Australia | Seoul, South Korea |
| | | Report | | Attendance: 30,000; Referee: Ulf Eriksson (Sweden) |

| 30 October 1977 | Hong Kong | 2–5 | Australia | Causeway Bay, Hong Kong |
| | Tang 66'; Chung 80' | Report | Ollerton 18', 21', 27'; Abonyi 59' (pen.); Bennett 86' | Stadium: Hong Kong Stadium; Attendance: 8,000; Referee: Ulf Eriksson (Belgium) |

| 19 November 1977 | Kuwait | 1–0 | Australia | Kuwait City, Kuwait |
| | Al-Dakhil 51' | Report | | Attendance: 25,000; Referee: Josef Bucek (Austria) |

| 25 November 1977 | Iran | 1–0 | Australia | Tehran, Iran |
| | Jahani 44' | Report | | Stadium: Ayramehr Stadium; Attendance: 25,000; Referee: Josef Bucek (Austria) |

== Domestic soccer ==
=== National Soccer League ===
| Pos | Team | Pld | W | D | L | GF | GA | GD | Pts | Relegation |
|---|---|---|---|---|---|---|---|---|---|---|
| 1 | Eastern Suburbs (C) | 26 | 13 | 11 | 2 | 52 | 28 | +24 | 37 | |
| 2 | Marconi Fairfield | 26 | 15 | 7 | 4 | 42 | 21 | +21 | 37 | |
| 3 | Fitzroy United | 26 | 12 | 8 | 6 | 41 | 34 | +7 | 32 | |
| 4 | Adelaide City | 26 | 12 | 7 | 7 | 50 | 31 | +19 | 31 | |
| 5 | Western Suburbs | 26 | 11 | 7 | 8 | 38 | 29 | +9 | 29 | |
| 6 | St George-Budapest | 26 | 7 | 14 | 5 | 39 | 35 | +4 | 28 | |
| 7 | West Adelaide | 26 | 8 | 10 | 8 | 38 | 32 | +6 | 26 | |
| 8 | Footscray JUST | 26 | 9 | 6 | 11 | 36 | 39 | −3 | 24 | |
| 9 | Brisbane Lions | 26 | 9 | 5 | 12 | 27 | 41 | −14 | 23 | |
| 10 | Brisbane City | 26 | 8 | 6 | 12 | 30 | 35 | −5 | 22 | |
| 11 | South Melbourne | 26 | 7 | 8 | 11 | 27 | 35 | −8 | 22 | |
| 12 | Sydney Olympic | 26 | 7 | 7 | 12 | 25 | 38 | −13 | 21 | |
| 13 | Canberra City | 26 | 5 | 7 | 14 | 22 | 39 | −17 | 17 | |
| 14 | Mooroolbark (R) | 26 | 5 | 5 | 16 | 31 | 61 | −30 | 15 | Relegation to the 1978 Victoria Metropolitan League Three |

Source: rsssf.com
Rules for classification: 1) Points; 2) Goal difference; 3) Goals scored
(C) Champions; (R) Relegated

=== NSL Cup ===
==== Final ====
5 October 1977

| Brisbane City | 1–1 (a.e.t.) | Marconi |
|---|---|---|
| Tokesi 60' | Report | Sharne 40' |
Penalties
| | 5–3 |

Perry Park, Brisbane
Attendance: 7,000
Referee: Stewart Mellings
