= 1977 National Soccer League =

Australian soccer season

National Soccer League
- Season: 1977
- Dates: 2 April — 26 September 1977
- Champions: Eastern Suburbs; 1st title
- Matches: 182
- Goals: 498 (2.74 per match)
- Top goalscorer: Dixie Deans (16 goals)
- Best goalkeeper: Allan Maher (12 clean sheets)
- Biggest home win: Adelaide City 10–3 Mooroolbark (5 September 1977)
- Biggest away win: Fitzroy United 1–8 Marconi Fairfield (20 June 1977)
- Highest scoring: Adelaide City 10–3 Mooroolbark (5 September 1977)
- Longest winning run: 6 matches Fitzroy United
- Longest unbeaten run: 17 matches Eastern Suburbs
- Longest winless run: 12 matches Mooroolbark
- Longest losing run: 5 matches Brisbane Lions
- Highest attendance: 15,000; South Melbourne 2–3 St George-Budapest (13 June 1977)
- Lowest attendance: 300; Mooroolbark 1–3 Adelaide City (5 June 1977)
- Total attendance: 706,009
- Average attendance: 3,901

The 1977 National Soccer League season was the first season of the National Soccer League of Australia. The league was not only the first national soccer league in Australia but the first of any of the forms of football in Australia. Clubs predominantly joined from the top leagues in each state, with the exception of Tasmania and Western Australia, and Canberra City forming in 1977 to join the league. The inaugural champions were Eastern Suburbs.

== Background ==
Attempts had been made to start a national league several times during the 1960s and 1970s, however it wasn't until 1975 that the talk became serious. In April 1975, nine clubs from New South Wales, Queensland and South Australia agreed to form a national league in either 1976 or 1977. Frank Lowy, president of Hakoah-Eastern Suburbs and Alex Pongrass, St George-Budapest president led a concerted effort to bring in teams from Victoria over objections from the state association. Eventually, four Victorian clubs joined with the addition of a team from the Australian Capital Territory.

== Teams ==
=== Stadiums and locations ===
Locations of the 1977 National Soccer League teams

Table lists in alphabetical order.

Team	Location	Stadium	Capacity
Adelaide City	Adelaide	Olympic Sports Field	5,000
Brisbane City	Brisbane	Perry Park	5,000
Brisbane Lions	Brisbane	Perry Park	5,000
Canberra City	Canberra; Queanbeyan	Manuka Oval; Seiffert Oval	16,000; 15,000
Fitzroy	Melbourne	Olympic Park Stadium	18,500
Footscray	Melbourne	Middle Park Stadium	18,000
Marconi Fairfield	Sydney	Marconi Stadium	9,000
Mooroolbark	Melbourne	Middle Park Stadium; Esther Park; Wembley Park	18,000; 4,000; 2,000
South Melbourne	Melbourne	Middle Park Stadium	18,000
St George	Sydney	Sydney Sports Ground; Marconi Stadium	35,000; 9,000
Eastern Suburbs	Sydney	Sydney Sports Ground	35,000
Sydney Olympic	Sydney	Sydney Sports Ground; Wentworth Park	35,000; 10,000
Western Suburbs	Sydney	Sydney Sports Ground; Englefield Stadium	35,000 ?
West Adelaide	Adelaide	Hindmarsh Stadium	16,500

== League table ==
Pos	Team	Pld	W	D	L	GF	GA	GD	Pts	Relegation
1	Eastern Suburbs (C)	26	13	11	2	52	28	+24	37	
2	Marconi Fairfield	26	15	7	4	42	21	+21	37	
3	Fitzroy United	26	12	8	6	41	34	+7	32	
4	Adelaide City	26	12	7	7	50	31	+19	31	
5	Western Suburbs	26	11	7	8	38	29	+9	29	
6	St George-Budapest	26	7	14	5	39	35	+4	28	
7	West Adelaide	26	8	10	8	38	32	+6	26	
8	Footscray JUST	26	9	6	11	36	39	−3	24	
9	Brisbane Lions	26	9	5	12	27	41	−14	23	
10	Brisbane City	26	8	6	12	30	35	−5	22	
11	South Melbourne	26	7	8	11	27	35	−8	22	
12	Sydney Olympic	26	7	7	12	25	38	−13	21	
13	Canberra City	26	5	7	14	22	39	−17	17	
14	Mooroolbark (R)	26	5	5	16	31	61	−30	15	Relegation to the 1978 Victoria Metropolitan League Three

Source: rsssf.com
Rules for classification: 1) Points; 2) Goal difference; 3) Goals scored
(C) Champions; (R) Relegated

== Results ==
Home \ Away	ADE	BRC	BRL	CAN	FIT	FOO	MAR	MOO	SOU	STG	SYC	SYO	WSA	WST
Adelaide City	—	1–2	0–0	2–0	1–0	4–1	1–0	10–3	2–0	1–1	1–2	3–0	2–2	1–2
Brisbane City	1–0	—	3–1	0–1	1–1	1–3	0–1	3–1	2–0	1–1	0–0	3–0	1–0	0–1
Brisbane Lions	1–1	2–1	—	0–1	2–1	2–0	1–1	2–1	2–0	1–1	0–4	0–2	1–4	4–0
Canberra City	1–1	2–0	1–2	—	0–1	0–1	1–0	1–4	0–2	2–2	0–0	4–0	1–3	0–3
Fitzroy	1–0	3–2	4–1	2–0	—	2–0	1–8	2–0	5–2	1–2	1–3	2–0	0–0	2–2
Footscray	3–4	2–1	4–2	3–0	1–3	—	3–4	1–0	2–2	0–0	2–2	1–0	0–1	2–1
Marconi Fairfield	0–4	1–0	0–1	0–0	0–0	1–0	—	1–0	3–0	0–0	1–1	0–0	2–1	3–0
Mooroolbark	1–3	1–1	0–1	3–2	1–2	2–2	2–3	—	2–4	1–0	2–2	1–1	1–1	0–2
South Melbourne	0–0	0–1	1–0	1–1	1–1	0–2	1–2	2–0	—	2–3	0–0	1–1	1–2	2–0
St George-Budapest	0–2	3–2	0–0	2–0	1–2	2–2	1–3	5–1	1–1	—	1–1	3–3	1–0	1–1
Eastern Suburbs	6–1	3–1	2–0	2–1	1–1	4–3	2–4	3–0	0–1	2–2	—	2–0	1–1	2–1
Sydney Olympic	3–1	4–0	1–0	2–2	3–1	0–0	0–2	1–2	0–2	2–0	0–0	—	0–4	0–3
West Adelaide	1–3	3–3	5–1	0–0	1–1	1–0	0–1	1–2	0–2	2–0	1–3	0–4	—	0–3
Western Suburbs	0–0	0–0	3–0	3–1	0–1	0–0	1–1	5–0	2–0	3–2	3–4	0–2	1–1	—

Source: OzFootball
Legend: Blue = home team win; Yellow = draw; Red = away team win.
For upcoming matches, an "a" indicates there is an article about the rivalry between the two participants.

== Season statistics ==
=== Top scorers ===
Rank	Player	Club	Goals
1	(Scotland) Dixie Deans	Adelaide City	16
2	(England) Terry Smith	Eastern Suburbs	14
3	(Australia) Murray Barnes	Eastern Suburbs	12
3	(Australia) John Kosmina	West Adelaide	12
5	(Australia) Gary Cole	Fitzroy United	11
6	(England) Geoff Morris	Brisbane Lions	10
7	(Australia) Branko Buljevic	Fitzroy United	9
7	(South Africa) Graham Norris	Western Suburbs	9
7	(Australia) John Nyskohus	Adelaide City	9
7	(Australia) Peter Sharne	Marconi Fairfield	9

==== Hat-tricks ====
Player	For	Against	Result	Date	Ref
(Australia) Murray Barnes	Eastern Suburbs	Adelaide City	6–1 (H)	7 May 1977	
(England) Terry Smith	Eastern Suburbs	Brisbane Lions	4–0 (A)	5 June 1977	
(Australia) Ernie Campbell	Marconi	Fitzroy	8–1 (A)	20 June 1977	
(Australia) Tom Murray	Brisbane Lions	Western Suburbs	4–0 (H)	25 July 1977	
(Australia) Peter Ollerton	South Melbourne	Mooroolbark	4–2 (A)	29 August 1977	
(Scotland) Dixie Deans	Adelaide City	Mooroolbark	10–3 (H)	5 September 1977	
(Scotland) Dixie Deans	Adelaide City	Footscray	4–3 (A)	12 September 1977	

=== Clean sheets ===
Rank	Player	Club	Clean sheets
1	(Australia) Alan Maher	Marconi Fairfield	12
2	(England) Terry Eaton	Western Suburbs	11
3	(Australia) Peter Blasby	Fitzroy United	9
3	(Australia) Roger Romanowicz	Adelaide City	9
5	(Australia) Gary Meier	Sydney Olympic	8
6	(Scotland) Dennis Boland	Footscray JUST	7
6	(Argentina) Osvaldo Borzi	Brisbane City	7
6	(Australia) Jack Reilly	South Melbourne	7
9	(Australia) Martyn Crook	West Adelaide	6
9	(New Zealand) Phil Dando	Brisbane Lions	6

=== Discipline ===
==== Player ====
- Most yellow cards: 7
  - (Australia) Kevin Mullen (Eastern Suburbs)
- Most red cards: 2
  - (Australia) Alan Niven (Brisbane Lions)
  - (South Africa) Graham Norris (Western Suburbs)
  - (Scotland) Graham Honeyman (West Adelaide)
  - (Australia) Dave Pillans (West Adelaide)

==== Club ====
- Most yellow cards: 29
  - West Adelaide
- Fewest yellow cards: 5
  - Fitzroy United
- Most red cards: 5
  - West Adelaide
- Fewest red cards: 0
  - Seven teams

== Awards ==
Award	Name	Club
Player of the Year	Jimmy Rooney	Marconi
Young Player of the Year	John Kosmina	West Adelaide
Coach of the Year	Rale Rasic	Marconi
