= 1977 NSL Cup =

National Soccer League Cup

Tournament details
- Country: Australia
- Dates: 20 September – 9 October 1977
- Teams: 14

Final positions
- Champions: Brisbane City (1st title)
- Runners-up: Marconi-Fairfield

Tournament statistics
- Matches played: 13
- Goals scored: 41 (3.15 per match)
- Top goal scorer(s): Branko Buljevic; Gary Cole; Peter Sharne (3 goals each)

The 1977 NSL Cup was the first edition of the National Soccer League Cup, which was a national association football (soccer) knockout cup competition in Australia. All 14 NSL teams from around Australia entered the competition and it immediately followed the home and away season, as there was no final series. The competition was known as the Philips Cup under a sponsorship arrangement with Dutch company Philips.

== Background ==
The NSL Cup became a concept in January 1977 by the Australian Soccer Federation (now Football Australia) adopting the proposal to introduce a national knock-out competition in conjunction with the National Soccer League. It was proposed that all 14 NSL teams would enter along with other state league champions, but didn't feature state league teams for this edition until the next edition in 1978.

== Teams ==
The NSL Cup was a knockout competition with 14 teams taking part all trying to reach the Final in October 1977. The competition consisted of the 14 teams from the National Soccer League.

Round	Main date	Number of fixtures	Clubs remaining
First round	Tuesday 20 September 1977	8	14 → 7
Quarter-finals	Sunday 2 October 1977	3	7 → 4
Semi-finals	Thursday 6 October 1977	2	4 → 2
Final	Sunday 9 October 1977	1	2 → 1

== Bracket ==
First round
Brisbane City	3
Brisbane Lions	2
Western Suburbs	2
Sydney Olympic	1
West Adelaide (p)	2 (4)
Adelaide City	2 (2)
Fitzroy United	1
Footscray JUST	0
Mooroolbark	1
South Melbourne	0
Marconi-Fairfield	1
Eastern Suburbs Hakoah	0
Canberra City	2
St George Budapest	1

Quarter-finals
Brisbane City (p)	1 (5)
Western Suburbs	1 (4)
Fitzroy United	3
Mooroolbark	0
Marconi-Fairfield	5
Canberra City	1

Semi-finals
Brisbane City (a.e.t.)	3
West Adelaide	0
Fitzroy United	2
Marconi-Fairfield	3

Final
Brisbane City (p)	1 (5)
Marconi-Fairfield	1 (3)

== First round ==
20 September	West Adelaide	2–2 (a.e.t.) (4–2 p)	Adelaide City	Adelaide
	McGregor 24'; Kosmina 60'	Report	Boyle 70' (o.g.); Northcote 84'	Stadium: Hindmarsh Stadium; Attendance: 8,656

20 September	Western Suburbs	2–1	Sydney Olympic	Sydney
	Turnbull 31', 78'	Report	Jamieson 86'	Stadium: Marconi Stadium; Attendance: 2,237; Referee: Tim Davies

20 September	Marconi-Fairfield	1–0	Eastern Suburbs Hakoah	Sydney
	Prskalo 25'	Report		Stadium: Marconi Stadium; Attendance: 2,237; Referee: Richard Lorenc

21 September	Brisbane City	3–2	Brisbane Lions	Brisbane
	Echeverria 3'; Caldwell 49', 68'	Report	Spearritt 17'; Neale 75'	Stadium: Perry Park; Attendance: 4,000; Referee: Peter Lampley

21 September	Canberra City	2–1	St George-Budapest	Canberra
	Alston 2'; Bourke 81'	Report	Jankovics 90+1'	Stadium: Manuka Oval; Attendance: 1,000; Referee: Dennis McDermott

21 September	Fitzroy United	1–0	Footscray JUST	Melbourne
	Cole 61'	Report		Stadium: Olympic Park; Attendance: 4,000; Referee: Don Campbell

22 September	Mooroolbark	1–0	South Melbourne	Melbourne
	Lowrey 44'	Report		Stadium: Olympic Park; Attendance: 4,000; Referee: Tony Boskovic

== Quarter-finals ==
West Adelaide had a bye for the Quarter-finals.

2 October	Brisbane City	1–1 (a.e.t.) (5–4 p)	Western Suburbs	Brisbane
	Johnston 5'	Report	Harding 55'	Stadium: Perry Park; Attendance: 4,000; Referee: David Yelland

2 October	Fitzroy United	3–0	Mooroolbark	Melbourne
	Buljevic 15', 77'; Cole 50'	Report		Stadium: Olympic Park; Attendance: 2,000; Referee: Barry Wilkinson

3 October	Marconi-Fairfield	5–1	Canberra City	Sydney
	Mariani 25'; Rooney 44'; Sharne 58'; Byrne 75'; Campbell 87'	Report	Henderson 41'	Stadium: Sydney Sports Ground; Attendance: 1,190; Referee: Bill Jones

== Semi-finals ==
5 October	Brisbane City	3–0 (a.e.t.)	West Adelaide	Brisbane
	Johnston 93'; Pimblett 102'; Kibbey 118'	Report		Stadium: Perry Park; Attendance: 5,000

6 October	Fitzroy United	2–3	Marconi-Fairfield	Melbourne
	Buljevic 10'; Cole 62'	Report	Mariani 26'; Campbell 61'; Sharne 88'	Stadium: Olympic Park; Attendance: 5,000

== Final ==
5 October 1977

Brisbane City	1–1 (a.e.t.)	Marconi
Tokesi 60'	Report	Sharne 40'
Penalties
	5–3

Perry Park, Brisbane
Attendance: 7,000
Referee: Stewart Mellings

== Top scorers ==
Rank	Player	Club	Goals
1	(Australia) Branko Buljevic	Fitzroy United	3
1	(Australia) Gary Cole	Fitzroy United	3
1	(Australia) Peter Sharne	Marconi	3
4	(Australia) Kevin Caldwell	Brisbane City	2
4	(Australia) Ernie Campbell	Marconi	2
4	(Australia) Ian Johnston	Brisbane City	2
4	(Australia) Berti Mariani	Marconi	2
4	(Australia) Warren Turnbull	Western Suburbs	2
