= Dixie Deans =

Scottish footballer (1946–2025)

Personal information
- Full name: John Kelly Deans
- Date of birth: 30 July 1946
- Place of birth: Johnstone, Scotland
- Date of death: 9 December 2025 (aged 79)
- Position: Centre forward

Youth career
- Neilston Juniors

Senior career*
Years	Team	Apps	(Gls)
1965	Albion Rovers (trialist)	1	(0)
1965–1971	Motherwell	152	(78)
1971–1976	Celtic	126	(89)
1976–1977	Luton Town	14	(6)
1977	→ Carlisle United (loan)	4	(2)
1977	→ Partick Thistle (loan)	6	(2)
1977	Shelbourne	5	(0)
1977–1980	Adelaide City	57	(30)
Total		360	(207)

International career
1974	Scotland	2	(0)
- * Club domestic league appearances and goals

John Kelly "Dixie" Deans (30 July 1946 – 9 December 2025) was a Scottish footballer who played as a centre forward in the 1960s and 1970s, primarily for Motherwell and Celtic. Deans played in two international matches for Scotland, both in 1974. A prolific goal-scorer, Deans was nicknamed "Dixie" in honour of Everton and England centre-forward Dixie Dean.

== Early life ==
John Kelly Deans was born on 30 July 1946 in Thorn Hospital, located outside of Paisley in Johnstone, Scotland. His father, John, worked as a laborer in a paper mill. He died when Deans was only 4 years old. His mother, Kathleen, worked odd jobs to support him and his three siblings.

== Club career ==
Deans started his career with Neilston Juniors, and after a trial with Albion Rovers he joined Motherwell in 1965 and spent six seasons with the Fir Park side. He signed for Celtic in a £17,500 deal on 31 October 1971.

He played for Celtic until 1976, scoring 125 goals in 186 games and setting several scoring records. The six goals he struck in a defeat of Partick Thistle in the 1973–74 season is a post-war record for a single game; Thistle's goalkeeper was the Scotland goalkeeper Alan Rough. He is the only player in Scottish football history to twice score a hat trick in a major cup final, achieving the feat in the 1972 Scottish Cup Final and the 1974 Scottish League Cup Final, both against Hibernian.

Deans is also remembered for the part he played in the semi-final of the 1971–72 European Cup; the two legs and extra-time failed to yield a single goal and so the tie proceeded to penalties. Deans, who had come on as a substitute, took the first kick for Celtic and missed. Inter Milan then scored all five of their penalties and moved on to the final.

In 1976, Deans was transferred to Luton Town in a £20,000 deal. He spent a month on loan to Carlisle United in 1977 and played briefly with League of Ireland side Shelbourne (five league games, no goals) before moving to Australia to play for Adelaide City. He signed on a $25,000 contract and was the top scorer with 16 goals in the inaugural 1977 National Soccer League season. With the club he also won the 1979 NSL Cup, defeating St. George in the final 3–2. He returned to Scotland with Partick Thistle in 1980, but only played in pre-season friendly games before retiring.

== International career ==
Deans earned two caps for Scotland, both in 1974. He was left out of the Scotland squad for the 1974 FIFA World Cup in West Germany. He had made the initial 40-man squad, but missed the final cut of 22, as Donald Ford and Denis Law were selected instead. Deans was eventually capped in October 1974, in a 3–0 win against East Germany, and a month later won a second cap in a 2–1 defeat against Spain.

== Retirement and death ==
In his autobiography There's Only One Dixie Deans, Deans wrote that whilst living in Australia, he met Bob Marley, who asked him, "Are you the Dixie Deans who used to play for Celtic?" Marley said that he envied Deans for having played at Celtic Park. Deans was later a match-day host at Celtic Park, where he entertained guests along with other former Celtic players.

Deans died on 9 December 2025, aged 79.

== Honours ==
Motherwell

- Scottish Division Two: 1968–69

Celtic

- Scottish Division One: 1971–72, 1972–73, 1973–74
- Scottish Cup: 1971–72, 1973–74
- Scottish League Cup: 1974–75
- Drybrough Cup: 1974–75

Adelaide City

- NSL Cup: 1979
