= Western Suburbs SC (NSW) =

Australian Football club, based in Sydney, NSW

- Full name: Western Suburbs Soccer Club
- Founded: 1964
- Dissolved: 1978

The Western Suburbs Soccer Club was an Australian association football club based in Sydney. The club was a foundation member of Australia's National Soccer League in 1977, after previously playing in NSW Division 1 and NSW Division 2. Western Suburbs were absorbed by APIA Leichhardt FC for the 1979 NSL season.

== Seasons ==
Key to league competitions

- NSW Div. 1 = Division One
- NSW Div. 2 = Division Two
- NSL = National Soccer League

Key to position colours and symbols

1st or W	Winners
2nd or RU	Runners-up
3rd	Third
♦	Top scorer in division

Key to cup competitions

- Australia Cup = FFA Cup/Australia Cup (from 2014).
  Includes Australia Cup (1962–1968) and NSL Cup (1977–1997)
- AMP = Ampol Cup

Key to cup and finals results

- 1R, 2R, 3R...7R = 1st Round, 2nd Round, 3rd Round...7th Round
- GS = Group Stage
- EF = Elimination Final
- PF = Preliminary Final
- PO = Playoff Final
- R32 = Round of 32
- R16 = Round of 16
- QF = Quarterfinals
- SF = Semifinals
- RU = Runners-Up
- W = Winners
- Unk = Result unknown

Season	League										Waratah Cup	Australia Cup	Other	Top scorer	
Season	Div	P	W	D	L	F	A	Pts	Pos	Finals	Waratah Cup	Australia Cup	Other	Player(s)	Goals
1964	Amateur B	22	10	2	10	62	81	22	7th	–					
1965	unknown														
1966	Inter-suburban 3	18	9	4	5	45	37	22	3rd	–					
1967	NSW Div. 2	22	11	4	7	45	34	26	6th	–					
1968	NSW Div. 2	22	17	1	4	64	28	35	2nd	RU					
1969	NSW Div. 2	22	13	5	4	66	19	31	3rd	RU					
1970	NSW Div. 2	22	17	3	2	57	17	37	1st	–					
1971	NSW Div. 1	22	13	4	5	42	27	30	3rd	RU					
1972	NSW Div. 1	22	4	8	10	27	34	16	9th	–					
1973	NSW Div. 1	22	11	4	7	39	23	26	4th	SF					
1974	NSW Div. 1	22	11	6	5	31	19	28	4th	SF					
1975	NSW Div. 1	22	7	7	8	24	23	21	8th	–					
1976	NSW Div. 1	22	8	2	12	33	38	18	9th	–					
1977	NSL	22	11	7	8	38	29	29	5th	–					
1978	NSL	22	9	6	11	41	45	24	9th	–					

Source: OzFootball

== Honours ==
- Ampol Cup Winner: 1971, 1976.
- NSW State League Runner-Up: 1971 (lost grand final to St George Budapest 3–2).
- Federation Cup Runner-Up: 1975.
- NSW Division 2 Champion: 1970.

== Notable former players ==
- Peter Wilson
- Colin Curran
- Dave Harding
- Brian O'Donnell
- Iswadi Idris
