= Mooroolbark Soccer Club =

Australian soccer club

- Full name: Mooroolbark Soccer Club
- Nickname: The Barkers
- Founded: 1962
- Ground: Esther Park
- Capacity: 4,000
- Manager: Marty O'Hare
- League: Victorian State League Division 2
- 2026: 9th
- Website: https://www.thebarkers.com.au
Home colours	Away colours

Mooroolbark Soccer Club is an Australian soccer club based in Mooroolbark, an outer eastern suburb of Melbourne, Victoria. The club currently plays in Victorian State League Division 2.

== History ==
Founded by two Dutch men, they formed a Dutch team with the name Mooroolbark United Soccer Club in 1962. Mooroolbark's backing changed to a British influenced club in its formative years. In 1978, the United tagline was dropped completely from the name.

=== 1964–1969: The Early Years ===
The club's first full season in the Victorian Metropolitan League 4th Division saw it finish 9th. The following years would see the club improve its season finishes, finishing 7th (1965), 6th (1966), 5th (1967), 3rd (1968), before winning the Victorian Metropolitan League 4th Division title in 1969. This was a great year for the club as it secured both the Seniors and Reserves title and was the beginning of a huge rise up the footballing ranks.

=== 1970–1977: Promotion Through 5 Divisions In 7 Years ===
1970 saw the club play in the Victorian Metropolitan League 3rd Division, winning both the Seniors and Reserves titles and securing promotion to the Victorian Metropolitan League 2nd Division at its first attempt. The club finished Runners Up in 1971 to Green Gully Ajax and in 1972 finished 8th in its first season in the Victorian Metropolitan League 1st Division. It only took one more year for the club to win the Victorian Metropolitan League 1st Division title, upon doing so earning promotion to Victoria's highest League at the time – the Victorian State League.

The club's first season at this level was poor, winning 5 and drawing 7 of its 22 matches and finishing 11th however avoiding relegation. 1975 was a better season with the club finishing on the same points as 2nd-placed South Melbourne Hellas. 1976 was also a strong year for the club, again finishing 3rd in the Victorian State League behind South Melbourne (1st) and Footscray JUST (2nd).

=== 1977: Rise To The NSL ===
The club's claim to fame is as Victoria's (and Australia's) first national sporting club side. Mooroolbark enabled the National Soccer League to proceed, breaking the deadlock which was then in force between the budding National League and clubs from Victoria, whom the Victorian Soccer Federation had forbidden to join the competition. When Mooroolbark joined the NSL, officially as its first entrant, soon three other Victorian clubs, South Melbourne, Heidelberg United and Footscray JUST also joined, enabling the competition to go ahead.

Mooroolbark's stay in the NSL however, was short-lived. Under manager and former player Brian Edgley, the club finished in last place and was relegated back to the Victorian Leagues, but not to the Victorian State League, which it had been a member of from 1974 to 1976, but to the equivalent of a 3rd Division. As part of the requirements for all Victorian NSL clubs in 1977, they had to field a reserve side in the Victorian 2nd Division. Mooroolbark finished in a relegation spot and upon their return to Victorian competition the Victorian Soccer Federation saw fit that Mooroolbark should commence 1978 in the Victorian Metropolitan League 3rd Division (today's Victorian State League 3rd Division).

=== 1978–1981: Slide To The Provisional Leagues ===
Three relegations in four years saw the club sink to the Provisional Leagues, finishing 10th in the Victorian Metropolitan League 3rd Division in 1978 and 12th in 1979 (earning relegation) and finishing 11th in the Victorian Metropolitan League 4th Division in 1980 (again earning relegation).

1981 was the first time in its history that Mooroolbark had visited the Provisional Leagues however it was only a one-season stay as the club earned promotion back to the Victorian Metropolitan League 4th Division the following year.

=== 1982–1991: Battle Back To The Premier League ===
The next few years were a real battle for the club, however the hard work began to pay off. After spending the next four years in the Victorian Metropolitan League 4th Division (later re-structuring to become the Victorian Metropolitan League 3rd Division), the club ended up finishing 9th in both 1982 and 1983, 10th in 1984, 8th in 1985 before winning the Victorian Metropolitan League 3rd Division title with 17 wins and 6 draws from their 26 matches.

Their 1987 revisit to the Victorian Metropolitan League 2nd Division was a short one, gaining promotion that very year by finishing Runners Up to Westgate and missing the title by 1 point. The club's 1988 Victorian League 1st Division campaign was strong but missing out on promotion, finishing 3rd, however it was the club's title-winning 1989 Victorian League 1st Division season which saw the club back into the State's elite League – the Victorian State League.

The club's first foray in the Victorian State League for 14 years saw an average season, finishing mid-table with 13 wins, 7 draws and 14 losses from their 34 games. The 1991 season saw the Victorian State League renamed the Victorian Premier League however name-change or no name-change this would still see an end Mooroolbark's two-year stint in Victoria's top League, finishing 12th and earning relegation back to the newly named Victorian State League 1st Division.

=== 1992–2001: Slide To The Provisional Leagues: Part 2 ===
Mooroolbark's entry back into the Victorian State League 1st Division was short-lived, finishing 13th and earning relegation. The next 6 years would see Mooroolbark struggling in Victorian State League 2nd Division, finishing 12th in 1993, 11th in 1994, 10th in 1995, 13th in 1996, 6th in 1997 before a lowly 14th position in 1998 would see Mooroolbark slip further down the State Leagues ranks.

The club would only have a two-season stay in the Victorian State League 3rd Division, finishing 10th in 1999 and 12th in 2000 (earning relegation). Each State & Provisional League would also now be split into two divisions based on geographical location: North-West and South East (i.e. Victorian Provisional 1st Division North-West and Victorian Provisional 1st Division South-East).

=== Down, But Not Without A Fight ===
2001 would be only the 2nd year in the club's 39-year history that it would have played in the Provisional Leagues. The club finished 3rd in 2001, 3rd in 2002 and finally gained promotion back to the Victorian State 3rd Division South-East in 2003, finishing Runners Up to Chelsea Hajduk. 2004 would see the club finish a respectable 5th whilst 2005 would see the club go oh-so-close to promotion back to the Victorian State 2nd Division South-East, but missed out finishing 3rd behind Waverley Wanderers (1st) and Clayton (2nd).

2006 would see the club finish 8th however it was 2007 when the club finished 12th which would see them back to the Victorian Provisional 1st Division South-East League.

The club's finishing positions over the last few years have been 8th (2008), 6th (2009), 6th (2010), 6th (2011) and 5th (2012), narrowly missing out on promotion by 2 points.

=== Rapid rise to State 1 ===
2013 was the club's breakthrough year, winning both the Senior Men's and Reserve Men's Championships. Due to a league re-structure, Mooroolbark was promoted to State 2, effectively skipping State 3. Not to be overawed, a solid 4th-place finish in 2014 surprised many in the league.

Season 2015 season got off to a rocky start with the Barkers finding themselves in 7th position after 9 rounds. Their fortunes changed with the inspirational signing of right-back George Aratzis from local rivals Knox City, which sparked a 12-game unbeaten run which secured promotion to State 1 in the penultimate round of the season. This was courtesy of a 2–1 win thanks to a dramatic 93rd-minute goal from David Brickell.

Esther Park with Mt Dandenong in the background

== Former players ==
1. Players that have played/managed in the A-League or any foreign equivalent to this level (i.e. fully professional league).
2. Players with full international caps.
3. Players that hold a club record or have captained the club.

- (England) Brian Edgley
- (Australia) / (Italy) Brett Tronconi
- (England) / (Australia) Robert Havercroft
- (Wales) Ian Williamson
