= 1980 Marconi Fairfield FC season =

Marconi Fairfield
1980 season
- Head Coach: Les Scheinflug
- Stadium: Marconi Oval
- National Soccer League: 4th
- NSL Cup: Winners
- Top goalscorer: League: Mark Jankovics (16); All: Eddie Krncevic (19)
- Highest home attendance: 7,345 vs. Heidelberg United (14 May 1980); National Soccer League
- Lowest home attendance: 1,500 vs. Brisbane Lions (10 September 1980); NSL Cup
- Average home league attendance: 5,074
- Biggest win: 9–0 vs. Blacktown City (H) (16 March 1980); National Soccer League
- Biggest defeat: 1–5 vs. Blacktown City (A) (8 June 1980); National Soccer League
Home colours

The 1980 season was the fourth in the National Soccer League for Marconi Fairfield (now Marconi Stallions Football Club). In addition to the domestic league, they also participated in the NSL Cup. Marconi Fairfield finished 4th in their National Soccer League season, and won the NSL Cup.

== Players ==
Note: Flags indicate national team as defined under FIFA eligibility rules; some limited exceptions apply. Players may hold more than one non-FIFA nationality.

| No. | Pos. | Nation | Player |
|---|---|---|---|
| 1 | GK | AUS | Allan Maher |
| 2 | DF | AUS | Peter Brogan |
| 3 | DF | AUS | Paul Degney |
| 4 | DF | AUS | Tony Henderson |
| 5 | DF | AUS | Ivo Prskalo |
| 6 | MF | AUS | Gary Byrne |
| 7 | MF | AUS | Peter Raskopoulos |
| 8 | FW | ITA | Roberto Vieri |
| 9 | FW | AUS | Eddie Krncevic |

| No. | Pos. | Nation | Player |
|---|---|---|---|
| 10 | FW | AUS | Berti Mariani |
| 11 | FW | AUS | Peter Sharne |
| 13 | FW | AUS | Jim Muir |
| 14 | FW | AUS | Mark Jankovics |
| 15 | FW | AUS | Ken Lindsay |
| 16 | DF | AUS | Drago Tomasich |
| 17 | DF | AUS | Dennis Colusso |
| 18 | MF | AUS | Jimmy Cant |
| 20 | GK | AUS | Ron Corry |

== Competitions ==
=== Overall record ===
| Competition | First match | Last match | Starting round | Final position | Record | | | | | | | |
| Competition | First match | Last match | Starting round | Final position | Pld | W | D | L | GF | GA | GD | Win % |
|---|---|---|---|---|---|---|---|---|---|---|---|---|
| National Soccer League | 9 March 1980 | 28 September 1980 | Matchday 1 | 4th | 26 | 14 | 6 | 6 | 53 | 32 | +21 | 53.85 |
| NSL Cup | 25 April 1980 | 15 October 1980 | First round | Winners | 6 | 5 | 1 | 0 | 14 | 1 | +13 | 83.33 |
| Total | | | | | 32 | 19 | 7 | 6 | 67 | 33 | +34 | 59.38 |

Source: Competitions

=== National Soccer League ===
==== League table ====
| Pos | Team | Pld | W | D | L | GF | GA | GD | Pts | Qualification or relegation |
|---|---|---|---|---|---|---|---|---|---|---|
| 1 | Sydney City (C) | 26 | 16 | 5 | 5 | 51 | 26 | +25 | 37 | Qualification to Finals series (Note: The Finals series was not considered the championship for the 1980 National Soccer League.) |
| 2 | Heidelberg United | 26 | 15 | 6 | 5 | 55 | 33 | +22 | 36 | Qualification to Finals series |
| 3 | South Melbourne | 26 | 15 | 5 | 6 | 42 | 21 | +21 | 35 | Qualification to Finals series |
| 4 | Marconi Fairfield | 26 | 14 | 6 | 6 | 53 | 32 | +21 | 34 | Qualification to Finals series |
| 5 | Adelaide City | 26 | 13 | 4 | 9 | 40 | 27 | +13 | 30 | |
| 6 | Newcastle KB United | 26 | 12 | 6 | 8 | 32 | 31 | +1 | 30 | |
| 7 | Brisbane Lions | 26 | 7 | 11 | 8 | 28 | 32 | −4 | 25 | |
| 8 | APIA Leichhardt | 26 | 8 | 7 | 11 | 27 | 35 | −8 | 23 | |
| 9 | Footscray JUST | 26 | 7 | 9 | 10 | 32 | 41 | −9 | 23 | |
| 10 | Canberra City | 26 | 7 | 7 | 12 | 34 | 33 | +1 | 21 | |
| 11 | Blacktown City | 26 | 9 | 3 | 14 | 34 | 55 | −21 | 21 | |
| 12 | Brisbane City | 26 | 4 | 10 | 12 | 29 | 36 | −7 | 18 | |
| 13 | West Adelaide | 26 | 7 | 3 | 16 | 24 | 46 | −22 | 17 | |
| 14 | St George-Budapest (R) | 26 | 5 | 4 | 17 | 32 | 65 | −33 | 14 | Relegated to the 1981 NSW State League |

Updated to match(es) played on unknown. Source: rsssf.com
Rules for classification: 1) points; 2) goal difference; 3) number of goals scored.
(C) Champions; (R) Relegated

==== Results summary ====
| Overall | | | | | | | | Home | | | | | | Away | | | | | |
| Pld | W | D | L | GF | GA | GD | Pts | W | D | L | GF | GA | GD | W | D | L | GF | GA | GD |
|---|---|---|---|---|---|---|---|---|---|---|---|---|---|---|---|---|---|---|---|
| 26 | 14 | 6 | 6 | 53 | 32 | +21 | 48 | 8 | 3 | 2 | 33 | 15 | +18 | 6 | 3 | 4 | 20 | 17 | +3 |

Source: worldfootball.net

==== Results by round ====
| Round | 1 | 2 | 3 | 4 | 5 | 6 | 7 | 8 | 9 | 10 | 11 | 12 | 14 | 16 | 13 | 17 | 18 | 19 | 15 | 20 | 21 | 22 | 23 | 24 | 25 | 26 |
|---|---|---|---|---|---|---|---|---|---|---|---|---|---|---|---|---|---|---|---|---|---|---|---|---|---|---|
| Ground | A | H | A | H | A | H | A | H | H | A | H | A | A | A | H | H | H | A | H | H | A | A | H | A | H | A |
| Result | L | W | D | W | W | D | W | D | W | W | D | L | L | L | W | L | W | W | W | W | W | D | W | D | L | W |
| Position | 11 | 4 | 5 | 4 | 3 | 3 | 3 | 3 | 2 | 2 | 2 | 4 | 3 | 3 | 3 | 4 | 4 | 3 | 3 | 3 | 3 | 3 | 3 | 3 | 4 | 4 |
| Points | 0 | 2 | 3 | 5 | 7 | 8 | 10 | 11 | 13 | 15 | 16 | 16 | 16 | 16 | 18 | 18 | 20 | 22 | 24 | 26 | 28 | 29 | 31 | 32 | 32 | 34 |

Source: worldfootball.net
A = Away; H = Home; W = Win; D = Draw; L = Loss

==== Matches ====
Win Draw Loss

| 9 March 1980 1 | Sydney City | 2–1 | Marconi Fairfield | Sydney |
| 15:00 AEST | Smith 7'; Boden 55' | Report | Krncevic 87' | Stadium: Sydney Sports Ground; Attendance: 1,027; Referee: Tim Davies |

| 16 March 1980 2 | Marconi Fairfield | 9–0 | Blacktown City | Sydney |
| | Krncevic 22', 23', 63', 76'; Jankovics 49', 59', 71'; Sharne 61'; Vieri 65' | Report | | Stadium: Marconi Oval; Attendance: 5,527; Referee: Richard Lorenc |

| 23 March 1980 3 | APIA Leichhardt | 2–2 | Marconi Fairfield | Sydney |
| | Samuels 10', 23' | Report | Krncevic 29'; Sharne 81' | Stadium: Lambert Park; Attendance: 8,305; Referee: Peter Rampley |

| 30 March 1980 4 | Marconi Fairfield | 4–0 | Brisbane City | Sydney |
| | Sharne 48', 68'; Krncevic 59'; Jankovics 65' | Report | | Stadium: Marconi Oval; Attendance: 4,725; Referee: Tony Boskovic |

| 6 April 1980 5 | Canberra City | 0–1 | Marconi Fairfield | Canberra |
| | | Report | Mariani 56' | Stadium: Bruce Stadium; Attendance: 8,875; Referee: Stewart Mellings |

| 13 April 1980 6 | Marconi Fairfield | 2–2 | Footscray JUST | Sydney |
| | Raskopoulos 13'; Krncevic 33' | Report | Hazabent 16'; Picioane 63' | Stadium: Marconi Oval; Attendance: 5,666; Referee: Doug Rennie |

| 20 April 1980 7 | Adelaide City | 0–1 | Marconi Fairfield | Adelaide |
| | | Report | Russell 21' (o.g.) | Stadium: Olympic Sports Field; Attendance: 4,600; Referee: Barry Harwood |

| 27 April 1980 8 | Marconi Fairfield | 0–0 | St George-Budapest | Sydney |
| 15:00 AEST | | Report | | Stadium: Marconi Oval; Attendance: 4,624; Referee: Jim Reeves |

| 4 May 1980 9 | Marconi Fairfield | 2–1 | Brisbane Lions | Sydney |
| 15:00 AEST | Byrne 6'; Jankovics 63' | Report | Millman 72' | Stadium: Marconi Oval; Attendance: 4,825; Referee: Tim Davies |

| 10 May 1980 10 | Newcastle KB United | 0–1 | Marconi Fairfield | Newcastle |
| | | Report | Lindsay 40' | Stadium: Newcastle International Sports Centre; Attendance: 8,547; Referee: Des Miles |

| 14 May 1980 11 | Marconi Fairfield | 1–1 | Heidelberg United | Sydney |
| 19:30 AEST | Jankovics 4' | Report | Cole 44' | Stadium: Marconi Oval; Attendance: 7,345; Referee: Ken Allen |

| 25 May 1980 12 | South Melbourne | 3–1 | Marconi Fairfield | Melbourne |
| | Evans 42', 49'; Campbell 60' | Report | Byrne 10' | Stadium: Middle Park Soccer Stadium; Attendance: 8,000; Referee: Jim Brennan |

| 8 June 1980 14 | Blacktown City | 5–1 | Marconi Fairfield | Sydney |
| | Selvage 47', 90'; Izatt 51'; O'Donnell 75' (pen.), 89' | Report | Jankovics 11' | Stadium: Gabbie Stadium; Attendance: 4,874; Referee: Tim Davies |

| 22 June 1980 16 | Brisbane City | 2–1 | Marconi Fairfield | Brisbane |
| | Potter 53' (pen.); McCluskey 77' | Report | Jankovics 11' | Stadium: Perry Park; Attendance: 2,337; Referee: Tony Beazleigh |

| 29 June 1980 13 | Marconi Fairfield | 2–1 | West Adelaide | Sydney |
| 15:00 AEST | Jankovics 60'; Byrne 81' (pen.) | Report | Manecas 57' | Stadium: Marconi Oval; Attendance: 3,275; Referee: Dave Nugent |

| 13 July 1980 17 | Marconi Fairfield | 1–2 | APIA Leichhardt | Sydney |
| 15:00 AEST | Mariani 30' | Report | McKie 43'; O'Connor 74' | Stadium: Marconi Oval; Attendance: 6,280; Referee: Stewart Mellings |

| 20 July 1980 18 | Marconi Fairfield | 3–2 | Canberra City | Sydney |
| 15:00 AEST | Jankovics 40'; Sharne 63'; Vieri 80' | Report | Stark 14'; Byrne 44' | Stadium: Marconi Oval; Attendance: 5,150; Referee: Doug Rennie |

| 27 July 1980 19 | Footscray JUST | 0–4 | Marconi Fairfield | Melbourne |
| | | Report | Sharne 16', 32'; Byrne 21'; Jankovics 24' | Stadium: Middle Park Soccer Stadium; Attendance: 1,000; Referee: Bobby Kerr |

| 6 August 1980 15 | Marconi Fairfield | 2–0 | Sydney City | Sydney |
| 15:00 AEST | Jankovics 20'; Krncevic 90+1' | Report | | Stadium: Marconi Oval; Attendance: 5,218; Referee: Don Campbell |

| 10 August 1980 20 | Marconi Fairfield | 2–1 | Adelaide City | Sydney |
| | Krncevic 77'; Russell 78' (o.g.) | Report | Jones 29' | Stadium: Marconi Oval; Attendance: 5,800; Referee: Chris Bambridge |

| 17 August 1980 21 | St George-Budapest | 0–3 | Marconi Fairfield | Sydney |
| | | Report | Krncevic 9'; Jankovics 49'; Vieri 72' (pen.) | Stadium: St George Stadium; Attendance: 3,217; Referee: Doug Rennie |

| 31 August 1980 22 | Brisbane Lions | 0–0 | Marconi Fairfield | Brisbane |
| | | Report | | Stadium: Lions Stadium; Attendance: 3,212; Referee: Richard Lorenc |

| 7 September 1980 23 | Marconi Fairfield | 4–1 | Newcastle KB United | Sydney |
| | Byrne 20' (pen.), 60' (pen.), 74'; Krncevic 33' | Report | Drinkwater 16' | Stadium: Marconi Oval; Attendance: 4,121; Referee: Tim Davies |

| 14 September 1980 24 | Heidelberg United | 3–3 | Marconi Fairfield | Melbourne |
| | Bozikas 18'; Yzendoorn 35'; Paton 45' | Report | Krncevic 8'; Jankovics 23', 30' | Stadium: Olympic Park; Attendance: 5,553; Referee: Don Campbell |

| 21 September 1980 25 | Marconi Fairfield | 1–4 | South Melbourne | Sydney |
| 15:00 AEST | Jankovics 34' | Report | Evans 13', 88'; Cummings 54', 90' | Stadium: Marconi Oval; Attendance: 3,406; Referee: Dave Nugent |

| 28 September 1980 26 | West Adelaide | 0–1 | Marconi Fairfield | Adelaide |
| | | Report | Sharne 52' | Stadium: Hindmarsh Stadium; Attendance: 3,600; Referee: Ken Allen |

==== Finals series ====
The Finals series was not considered the championship for the 1980 National Soccer League.

| 12 October 1980 Elimination semi-final | South Melbourne | 4–3 | Marconi Fairfield | Melbourne |
| | Evans 49', 82'; Xanthopoulos 75'; Buljevic 80' | Report | Sharne 10'; Byrne 19' (pen.); Krncevic 41' | Stadium: Middle Park Soccer Stadium; Attendance: 4,500; Referee: Chris Bambridge |

=== NSL Cup ===
Win Draw Loss

| 25 April 1980 First round | Marconi Fairfield | 3–0 | (New South Wales) Melita Eagles | Sydney |
| | Cant 12'; Krncevic ?', ?' | Report | | Stadium: Marconi Oval; Attendance: 3,889 |

| 5 July 1980 Second round | Newcastle KB United | 1–3 | Marconi Fairfield | Newcastle |
| | Burrows 4' | Report | Raskopoulos 39', 50'; Brogan 21' | Stadium: Newcastle International Sports Centre; Attendance: 4,989; Referee: Chris Bambridge |

| 3 August 1980 Quarter-finals | Marconi Fairfield | 4–0 | St George-Budapest | Sydney |
| | Krncevic 28', 82'; Byrne 34' (pen.); Jankovics 47' | Report | | Stadium: Marconi Oval; Attendance: 3,652; Referee: Henry Witschge |

| 10 September 1980 Semi-finals | Marconi Fairfield | 1–0 | Brisbane Lions | Sydney |
| | Krncevic 3' | Report | | Stadium: Marconi Oval; Attendance: 1,500; Referee: Jack Johnston |

| 4 October 1980 Final 1st Leg | Heidelberg United | 0–0 | Marconi Fairfield | Melbourne |
| | | Report | | Stadium: Olympic Park; Attendance: 6,388; Referee: Jack Johnston |

| 15 October 1980 Final 2nd Leg | Marconi Fairfield | 3–0 | Heidelberg United | Sydney |
| | Byrne 17' (pen.); Krncevic 64'; Sharne 87' | Report | | Stadium: Marconi Stadium; Attendance: 5,179; Referee: Jack Johnston |

== Statistics ==
=== Appearances and goals ===
Includes all competitions. Players with no appearances not included in the list.

| No. | Pos. | Nat. | Player | National Soccer League | | NSL Cup | | Total | |
| No. | Pos. | Nat. | Player | Apps | Goals | Apps | Goals | Apps | Goals |
|---|---|---|---|---|---|---|---|---|---|
| 1 | GK | (Australia) | Allan Maher | 25 | 0 | 5 | 0 | 30 | 0 |
| 2 | DF | (Australia) | Peter Brogan | 21+1 | 0 | 5 | 1 | 27 | 1 |
| 3 | DF | (Australia) | Paul Degney | 16 | 0 | 1 | 0 | 17 | 0 |
| 4 | DF | (Australia) | Tony Henderson | 15+1 | 0 | 5 | 0 | 21 | 0 |
| 5 | DF | (Australia) | Ivo Prskalo | 22 | 0 | 5 | 0 | 27 | 0 |
| 6 | MF | (Australia) | Gary Byrne | 24 | 7 | 5 | 2 | 29 | 9 |
| 7 | MF | (Australia) | Peter Raskopoulos | 23+1 | 1 | 5 | 2 | 29 | 3 |
| 8 | FW | (Italy) | Roberto Vieri | 12+3 | 3 | 0+1 | 0 | 16 | 3 |
| 9 | FW | (Australia) | Eddie Krncevic | 22+1 | 13 | 5 | 6 | 28 | 19 |
| 10 | FW | (Australia) | Berti Mariani | 13+5 | 2 | 2 | 0 | 20 | 2 |
| 11 | FW | (Australia) | Peter Sharne | 25 | 8 | 5 | 1 | 30 | 9 |
| 13 | FW | (Australia) | Jim Muir | 14+1 | 0 | 4 | 0 | 19 | 0 |
| 14 | FW | (Australia) | Mark Jankovics | 25+1 | 16 | 5 | 1 | 31 | 17 |
| 15 | FW | (Australia) | Ken Lindsay | 7+7 | 1 | 0+2 | 0 | 16 | 1 |
| 16 | DF | (Australia) | Drago Tomasich | 0 | 0 | 1 | 0 | 1 | 0 |
| 17 | GK | (Australia) | Dennis Colusso | 0 | 0 | 0+1 | 0 | 1 | 0 |
| 18 | MF | (Australia) | Jimmy Cant | 12+2 | 0 | 5 | 1 | 19 | 1 |
| 20 | GK | (Australia) | Ron Corry | 1 | 0 | 0 | 0 | 1 | 0 |
Player(s) transferred out but featured this season
| 12 | MF | (Australia) | John Russell | 9+2 | 0 | 0 | 0 | 11 | 0 |
| 13 | MF | (Australia) | Stuart Selvage | 0+1 | 0 | 0 | 0 | 1 | 0 |

=== Disciplinary record ===
Includes all competitions. The list is sorted by squad number when total cards are equal. Players with no cards not included in the list.

| Rank | No. | Pos. | Nat. | Player | National Soccer League | | | NSL Cup | | | Total | | |
| Rank | No. | Pos. | Nat. | Player | Yellow card | Second yellow card | Red card | Yellow card | Second yellow card | Red card | Yellow card | Second yellow card | Red card |
|---|---|---|---|---|---|---|---|---|---|---|---|---|---|
| 1 | 9 | FW | (Australia) | Eddie Krncevic | 0 | 0 | 2 | 0 | 0 | 0 | 0 | 0 | 2 |
| 2 | 7 | MF | (Australia) | Peter Raskopoulos | 0 | 0 | 1 | 0 | 0 | 0 | 0 | 0 | 1 |
| 3 | 3 | DF | (Australia) | Paul Degney | 4 | 0 | 0 | 0 | 0 | 0 | 4 | 0 | 0 |
| 3 | 5 | DF | (Australia) | Ivo Prskalo | 4 | 0 | 0 | 0 | 0 | 0 | 4 | 0 | 0 |
| 5 | 13 | FW | (Australia) | Jim Muir | 2 | 0 | 0 | 1 | 0 | 0 | 3 | 0 | 0 |
| 6 | 2 | DF | (Australia) | Peter Brogan | 2 | 0 | 0 | 0 | 0 | 0 | 2 | 0 | 0 |
| 6 | 4 | DF | (Australia) | Tony Henderson | 1 | 0 | 0 | 1 | 0 | 0 | 2 | 0 | 0 |
| 6 | 6 | MF | (Australia) | Gary Byrne | 1 | 0 | 0 | 1 | 0 | 0 | 2 | 0 | 0 |
| 6 | 18 | MF | (Australia) | Jimmy Cant | 1 | 0 | 0 | 1 | 0 | 0 | 2 | 0 | 0 |
| 10 | 8 | FW | (Italy) | Roberto Vieri | 1 | 0 | 0 | 0 | 0 | 0 | 1 | 0 | 0 |
| 10 | 11 | FW | (Australia) | Peter Sharne | 1 | 0 | 0 | 0 | 0 | 0 | 1 | 0 | 0 |
| 10 | 12 | MF | (Australia) | John Russell | 1 | 0 | 0 | 0 | 0 | 0 | 1 | 0 | 0 |
| 10 | 13 | MF | (Australia) | Stuart Selvage | 1 | 0 | 0 | 0 | 0 | 0 | 1 | 0 | 0 |
| 10 | 14 | FW | (Australia) | Mark Jankovics | 1 | 0 | 0 | 0 | 0 | 0 | 1 | 0 | 0 |
| 10 | 15 | FW | (Australia) | Ken Lindsay | 1 | 0 | 0 | 0 | 0 | 0 | 1 | 0 | 0 |
| Total | | | | | 21 | 0 | 2 | 4 | 0 | 0 | 25 | 0 | 2 |

=== Clean sheets ===
Includes all competitions. The list is sorted by squad number when total clean sheets are equal. Numbers in parentheses represent games where both goalkeepers participated and both kept a clean sheet; the number in parentheses is awarded to the goalkeeper who was substituted on, whilst a full clean sheet is awarded to the goalkeeper who was on the field at the start of play. Goalkeepers with no clean sheets not included in the list.

| Rank | No. | Nat. | Goalkeeper | NSL | NSL Cup | Total |
|---|---|---|---|---|---|---|
| 1 | 1 | (Australia) | Allan Maher | 10 | 3 (1) | 13 (1) |
| 2 | 20 | (Australia) | Ron Corry | 1 | 0 (1) | 1 (1) |
| Total | | | | 11 | 3 (1) | 15 |
