= 1979 Marconi Fairfield FC season =

Marconi Fairfield
1979 season
- Head Coach: Rale Rasic
- Stadium: Marconi Oval
- National Soccer League: 1st
- NSL Cup: First round
- Top goalscorer: League: Mark Jankovics (18); All: Mark Jankovics (18)
- Highest home attendance: 10,837 vs. APIA Leichhardt (28 May 1978); National Soccer League
- Lowest home attendance: 1,575 vs. Brisbane City (6 May 1979); National Soccer League
- Average home league attendance: 5,272
- Biggest win: 6–0 vs. South Melbourne (H) (22 April 1979); National Soccer League
- Biggest defeat: 0–4 vs. Heidelberg United (H) (17 June 1979); National Soccer League

The 1979 season was the third in the National Soccer League for Marconi Fairfield (now Marconi Stallions Football Club). In addition to the domestic league, they also participated in the NSL Cup. Marconi Fairfield finished 1st in their National Soccer League season, and were eliminated in the first round of the NSL Cup.

== Players ==
Note: Flags indicate national team as defined under FIFA eligibility rules; some limited exceptions apply. Players may hold more than one non-FIFA nationality.

| No. | Pos. | Nation | Player |
|---|---|---|---|
| 1 | GK | AUS | Allan Maher |
| 2 | DF | AUS | Peter Brogan |
| 3 | DF | AUS | Paul Degney |
| 4 | MF | AUS | John Russell |
| 5 | DF | AUS | Ivo Prskalo |
| 6 | DF | AUS | Tony Henderson |
| 7 | MF | AUS | Gary Byrne |
| 8 | FW | ITA | Roberto Vieri |

| No. | Pos. | Nation | Player |
|---|---|---|---|
| 9 | FW | AUS | Mark Jankovics |
| 10 | FW | AUS | Berti Mariani |
| 11 | FW | AUS | Peter Sharne |
| 12 | FW | AUS | Eddie Krncevic |
| 13 | MF | AUS | Stuart Selvage |
| 14 | FW | AUS | Ken Lindsay |
| 16 | DF | ENG | Mike Berry |

== Competitions ==
=== Overall record ===
| Competition | First match | Last match | Starting round | Final position | Record | | | | | | | |
| Competition | First match | Last match | Starting round | Final position | Pld | W | D | L | GF | GA | GD | Win % |
|---|---|---|---|---|---|---|---|---|---|---|---|---|
| National Soccer League | 11 March 1979 | 16 September 1979 | Matchday 1 | 1st | 26 | 15 | 6 | 5 | 58 | 32 | +26 | 57.69 |
| NSL Cup | 25 April 1979 | | First round | First round | 1 | 0 | 0 | 1 | 0 | 2 | −2 | 0.00 |
| Total | | | | | 27 | 15 | 6 | 6 | 58 | 34 | +24 | 55.56 |

Source: Competitions

=== National Soccer League ===
==== League table ====
| Pos | Team | Pld | W | D | L | GF | GA | GD | Pts | Qualification or relegation |
|---|---|---|---|---|---|---|---|---|---|---|
| 1 | Marconi Fairfield (C) | 26 | 15 | 6 | 5 | 58 | 32 | +26 | 40 (Note: A Bonus Point was awarded for victories of 4 goals or more.) | Qualification to Finals series (Note: The Finals series was not considered the championship for the 1979 National Soccer League.) |
| 2 | Heidelberg United | 26 | 14 | 7 | 5 | 44 | 30 | +14 | 36 | Qualification to Finals series |
| 3 | Sydney City | 26 | 15 | 3 | 8 | 47 | 29 | +18 | 34 | Qualification to Finals series |
| 4 | Brisbane City | 26 | 14 | 5 | 7 | 38 | 30 | +8 | 34 | Qualification to Finals series |
| 5 | Adelaide City | 26 | 13 | 6 | 7 | 43 | 27 | +16 | 33 | |
| 6 | Newcastle KB United | 26 | 11 | 9 | 6 | 43 | 30 | +13 | 32 | |
| 7 | West Adelaide | 26 | 10 | 4 | 12 | 28 | 31 | −3 | 25 | |
| 8 | APIA Leichhardt | 26 | 11 | 3 | 12 | 29 | 37 | −8 | 25 | |
| 9 | Brisbane Lions | 26 | 8 | 6 | 12 | 28 | 40 | −12 | 22 | |
| 10 | Footscray JUST | 26 | 8 | 3 | 15 | 29 | 43 | −14 | 20 | |
| 11 | St George-Budapest | 26 | 7 | 6 | 13 | 27 | 43 | −16 | 20 | |
| 12 | Canberra City | 26 | 6 | 8 | 12 | 25 | 41 | −16 | 20 | |
| 13 | Sydney Olympic (R) | 26 | 7 | 5 | 14 | 23 | 30 | −7 | 19 | Relegated to the 1980 NSW State League |
| 14 | South Melbourne | 26 | 6 | 3 | 17 | 26 | 45 | −19 | 16 | |

Updated to match(es) played on unknown. Source: rsssf.com
Rules for classification: 1) points; 2) goal difference; 3) number of goals scored.
(C) Champions; (R) Relegated

==== Results summary ====
| Overall | | | | | | | | Home | | | | | | Away | | | | | |
| Pld | W | D | L | GF | GA | GD | Pts | W | D | L | GF | GA | GD | W | D | L | GF | GA | GD |
|---|---|---|---|---|---|---|---|---|---|---|---|---|---|---|---|---|---|---|---|
| 26 | 15 | 6 | 5 | 58 | 32 | +26 | 51 | 7 | 4 | 2 | 25 | 16 | +9 | 8 | 2 | 3 | 33 | 16 | +17 |

Source: worldfootball.net

==== Results by round ====
| Round | 1 | 2 | 3 | 4 | 5 | 6 | 7 | 8 | 9 | 10 | 11 | 12 | 13 | 14 | 16 | 17 | 18 | 19 | 15 | 20 | 21 | 22 | 23 | 24 | 25 | 26 |
|---|---|---|---|---|---|---|---|---|---|---|---|---|---|---|---|---|---|---|---|---|---|---|---|---|---|---|
| Ground | A | H | A | H | H | A | H | A | H | A | H | A | H | A | A | H | A | H | H | A | H | A | H | A | H | A |
| Result | L | L | W | D | W | W | W | W | D | D | W | W | L | W | W | W | D | D | D | W | W | W | W | L | W | L |
| Position | 11 | 13 | 4 | 2 | 2 | 2 | 1 | 1 | 1 | 1 | 1 | 1 | 1 | 1 | 1 | 1 | 1 | 1 | 1 | 1 | 1 | 1 | 1 | 1 | 1 | 1 |
| Points | 0 | 0 | 3 | 4 | 6 | 9 | 12 | 14 | 15 | 16 | 18 | 20 | 20 | 23 | 25 | 27 | 28 | 29 | 30 | 32 | 34 | 36 | 38 | 38 | 40 | 40 |

Source: worldfootball.net
A = Away; H = Home; W = Win; D = Draw; L = Loss

==== Matches ====
Win Draw Loss

| 11 March 1979 1 | Canberra City | 3–1 | Marconi Fairfield | Canberra |
| | Fielding 49'; Byrne 63'; Davies 89' | Report | Jankovics 30' | Stadium: Bruce Stadium; Attendance: 6,845; Referee: Ken Allen |

| 18 March 1979 2 | Marconi Fairfield | 0–1 | Brisbane Lions | Sydney |
| | | Report | Wallace 5' | Stadium: Marconi Oval; Attendance: 3,800; Referee: Richard Lorenc |

| 25 March 1979 3 | Sydney City | 0–4 | Marconi Fairfield | Sydney |
| | | Report | Krncevic 16', 89'; Jankovics 74', 86' | Stadium: Wentworth Park; Attendance: 2,844; Referee: Tony Boskovic |

| 1 April 1979 4 | Marconi Fairfield | 4–4 | Adelaide City | Sydney |
| | Krncevic 12'; Byrne 56' (pen.), 78' (pen.); Mariani 90+2' | Report | Deans 38', 42'; J. Nyskohus 44'; Muniz 62' | Stadium: Marconi Oval; Attendance: 3,242; Referee: Peter Rampley |

| 8 April 1979 5 | Marconi Fairfield | 2–1 | St George-Budapest | Sydney |
| | Degney 60'; Sharne 67' | Report | Katholos 48' | Stadium: Marconi Oval; Attendance: 4,356; Referee: Jim Reeves |

| 15 April 1979 6 | Footscray JUST | 0–5 | Marconi Fairfield | Melbourne |
| | | Report | Jankovics 15', 30'; Henderson 41'; Sharne 45', 67' | Stadium: Olympic Park; Attendance: 5,200; Referee: Chris Bambridge |

| 22 April 1979 7 | Marconi Fairfield | 6–0 | South Melbourne | Sydney |
| | Degney 7'; Sharne 13', 85'; Jankovics 29', 60', 78' | Report | | Stadium: Marconi Oval; Attendance: 4,500; Referee: Tim Davies |

| 29 April 1979 8 | West Adelaide | 1–2 | Marconi Fairfield | Adelaide |
| | Kambas 37' | Report | Lindsay 9'; Krncevic 11' | Stadium: Hindmarsh Stadium; Attendance: 7,800; Referee: Don Campbell |

| 6 May 1979 9 | Marconi Fairfield | 3–3 | Brisbane City | Sydney |
| | Krncevic 8', 36'; Mariani 30' | Report | Low 25', 78'; Gaffney 77' | Stadium: Marconi Oval; Attendance: 1,575; Referee: Ken Allen |

| 13 May 1979 10 | APIA Leichhardt | 0–0 | Marconi Fairfield | Sydney |
| | | Report | | Stadium: Wentworth Park; Attendance: 10,856; Referee: Stewart Mellings |

| 3 June 1979 11 | Marconi Fairfield | 2–1 | Newcastle KB United | Sydney |
| | Jankovics 45', 55' | Report | Drinkwater 80' | Stadium: Marconi Oval; Attendance: 7,673; Referee: Richard Lorenc |

| 10 June 1979 12 | Sydney Olympic | 0–3 | Marconi Fairfield | Sydney |
| | | Report | Byrne 16' (pen.); Lindsay 67'; Jankovics 75' | Stadium: Pratten Park; Attendance: 4,452; Referee: Tim Davies |

| 17 June 1979 13 | Marconi Fairfield | 0–4 | Heidelberg United | Sydney |
| 15:00 AEST | | Report | Yzendoorn 65'; Paton 66'; Cole 70', 73' | Stadium: Marconi Oval; Attendance: 4,362; Referee: Des Miles |

| 24 June 1979 14 | Brisbane Lions | 0–4 | Marconi Fairfield | Brisbane |
| | | Report | Jankovics 22', 49'; Krncevic 60'; Byrne 66' | Stadium: Perry Park; Attendance: 1,500; Referee: Doug Rennie |

| 8 July 1979 16 | Adelaide City | 2–4 | Marconi Fairfield | Adelaide |
| | Kent 44', 57' | Report | Henderson 38'; Sharne 44'; Krncevic 60', 68' | Stadium: Olympic Sports Field; Attendance: 7,800; Referee: Chris Bambridge |

| 15 July 1979 17 | Marconi Fairfield | 1–0 | Sydney City | Sydney |
| | Sharne 8' | Report | | Stadium: Marconi Oval; Attendance: 8,784; Referee: Tony Beazleigh |

| 22 July 1979 18 | St George-Budapest | 1–1 | Marconi Fairfield | Sydney |
| | Russell 70' (o.g.) | Report | Mariani 88' | Stadium: St George Stadium; Attendance: 3,873; Referee: Bill Jones |

| 29 July 1979 19 | Marconi Fairfield | 0–0 | Footscray JUST | Sydney |
| | | Report | | Stadium: Marconi Oval; Attendance: 4,800; Referee: Peter Rampley |

| 1 August 1979 15 | Marconi Fairfield | 1–1 | Canberra City | Sydney |
| | Krncevic 83' | Report | Byrne 62' | Stadium: Marconi Oval; Attendance: 3,725; Referee: Henry Witschge |

| 5 August 1979 20 | South Melbourne | 1–2 | Marconi Fairfield | Melbourne |
| | Ristovski 57' | Report | Henderson 33'; Krncevic 70' | Stadium: Middle Park Soccer Stadium; Attendance: 5,000; Referee: Jack Johnston |

| 12 August 1979 21 | Marconi Fairfield | 2–1 | West Adelaide | Sydney |
| | Vieri 41'; Sharne 58' | Report | Boyle 54' | Stadium: Marconi Oval; Attendance: 5,480; Referee: Tony Boskovic |

| 26 August 1979 22 | Brisbane City | 3–4 | Marconi Fairfield | Brisbane |
| | Campbell 55', 65'; Gaffney 89' | Report | Jankovics 5', 62', 81'; Krncevic 17' | Stadium: Perry Park; Attendance: 6,535; Referee: Stewart Mellings |

| 2 September 1979 23 | Marconi Fairfield | 2–0 | APIA Leichhardt | Sydney |
| | Sharne 25'; Krncevic 55' | Report | | Stadium: Marconi Oval; Attendance: 10,837; Referee: Chris Bambridge |

| 8 September 1979 24 | Newcastle KB United | 2–1 | Marconi Fairfield | Newcastle |
| 14:30 AEST | Curran 23', 55' | Report | Jankovics 25' | Stadium: Newcastle International Sports Centre; Attendance: 12,448; Referee: Des Miles |

| 16 September 1979 25 | Marconi Fairfield | 2–0 | Sydney Olympic | Sydney |
| | | Report | | Stadium: Marconi Oval; Attendance: 5,400; Referee: Tony Beazleigh |

| 23 September 1979 26 | Heidelberg United | 3–2 | Marconi Fairfield | Melbourne |
| | Russell 4' (o.g.); Paton 33', 56' | Report | Jankovics 5'; Campbell 7' (o.g.) | Stadium: Olympic Park; Attendance: 5,630; Referee: Don Campbell |

==== Finals series ====
The Finals series was not considered the championship for the 1979 National Soccer League.

| 7 October 1979 1 | Marconi Fairfield | 2–1 | Heidelberg United | Sydney |
| | Byrne 1' (pen.); Henderson 68' | Report | Cole 25' | Stadium: Marconi Oval; Attendance: 6,523; Referee: Ken Allen |

| 14 October 1979 2 | Brisbane City | 2–1 | Marconi Fairfield | Brisbane |
| | Campbell 38'; Low 72' | Report | Jankovics 58' | Stadium: Perry Park; Attendance: 5,100; Referee: Chris Bambridge |

| 21 October 1979 3 | Marconi Fairfield | 0–1 | Sydney City | Sydney |
| | | Report | Barnes 75' | Stadium: Marconi Oval; Attendance: 4,782; Referee: Stewart Mellings |

=== NSL Cup ===
Win Draw Loss

| 25 April 1979 First round | Marconi Fairfield | 0–2 | (New South Wales) Melita Eagles | Sydney |
| | | Report | R. Farrugia 56'; McPherson 60' | Stadium: Marconi Oval; Attendance: 4,578; Referee: Ken Allen |

== Statistics ==
=== Appearances and goals ===
Includes all competitions. Players with no appearances not included in the list.

| No. | Pos. | Nat. | Player | National Soccer League | | NSL Cup | | Total | |
| No. | Pos. | Nat. | Player | Apps | Goals | Apps | Goals | Apps | Goals |
|---|---|---|---|---|---|---|---|---|---|
| 1 | GK | (Australia) | Allan Maher | 26 | 0 | 1 | 0 | 27 | 0 |
| 2 | DF | (Australia) | Peter Brogan | 9+6 | 0 | 1 | 0 | 16 | 0 |
| 3 | DF | (Australia) | Paul Degney | 26 | 2 | 1 | 0 | 27 | 2 |
| 4 | MF | (Australia) | John Russell | 24+1 | 0 | 1 | 0 | 26 | 0 |
| 5 | DF | (Australia) | Ivo Prskalo | 25 | 0 | 1 | 0 | 26 | 0 |
| 6 | DF | (Australia) | Tony Henderson | 25 | 3 | 1 | 0 | 26 | 3 |
| 7 | MF | (Australia) | Gary Byrne | 24 | 5 | 1 | 0 | 25 | 5 |
| 8 | FW | (Italy) | Roberto Vieri | 18+1 | 1 | 1 | 0 | 20 | 1 |
| 9 | FW | (Australia) | Mark Jankovics | 23 | 18 | 1 | 0 | 24 | 18 |
| 10 | FW | (Australia) | Berti Mariani | 6+6 | 3 | 0+1 | 0 | 13 | 3 |
| 11 | FW | (Australia) | Peter Sharne | 26 | 10 | 1 | 0 | 27 | 10 |
| 12 | FW | (Australia) | Eddie Krncevic | 26 | 13 | 1 | 0 | 27 | 13 |
| 13 | MF | (Australia) | Stuart Selvage | 0+3 | 0 | 0+1 | 0 | 4 | 0 |
| 14 | FW | (Australia) | Ken Lindsay | 11+4 | 2 | 0 | 0 | 15 | 2 |
| 16 | DF | (Australia) | Mike Berry | 17+2 | 0 | 0 | 0 | 19 | 0 |

=== Disciplinary record ===
Includes all competitions. The list is sorted by squad number when total cards are equal. Players with no cards not included in the list.

| Rank | No. | Pos. | Nat. | Player | National Soccer League | | | NSL Cup | | | Total | | |
| Rank | No. | Pos. | Nat. | Player | Yellow card | Second yellow card | Red card | Yellow card | Second yellow card | Red card | Yellow card | Second yellow card | Red card |
|---|---|---|---|---|---|---|---|---|---|---|---|---|---|
| 1 | 7 | MF | (Australia) | Gary Byrne | 4 | 0 | 1 | 0 | 0 | 0 | 4 | 0 | 1 |
| 2 | 3 | DF | (Australia) | Paul Degney | 5 | 0 | 0 | 0 | 0 | 0 | 5 | 0 | 0 |
| 2 | 5 | DF | (Australia) | Ivo Prskalo | 5 | 0 | 0 | 0 | 0 | 0 | 5 | 0 | 0 |
| 4 | 16 | DF | (England) | Mike Berry | 4 | 0 | 0 | 0 | 0 | 0 | 4 | 0 | 0 |
| 5 | 6 | DF | (Australia) | Tony Henderson | 3 | 0 | 0 | 0 | 0 | 0 | 3 | 0 | 0 |
| 6 | 9 | FW | (Australia) | Mark Jankovics | 2 | 0 | 0 | 0 | 0 | 0 | 2 | 0 | 0 |
| 6 | 11 | FW | (Australia) | Peter Sharne | 2 | 0 | 0 | 0 | 0 | 0 | 2 | 0 | 0 |
| 8 | 4 | MF | (Australia) | John Russell | 1 | 0 | 0 | 0 | 0 | 0 | 1 | 0 | 0 |
| 8 | 8 | FW | (Italy) | Roberto Vieri | 1 | 0 | 0 | 0 | 0 | 0 | 1 | 0 | 0 |
| Total | | | | | 27 | 0 | 1 | 0 | 0 | 0 | 27 | 0 | 1 |

=== Clean sheets ===
Includes all competitions. The list is sorted by squad number when total clean sheets are equal. Numbers in parentheses represent games where both goalkeepers participated and both kept a clean sheet; the number in parentheses is awarded to the goalkeeper who was substituted on, whilst a full clean sheet is awarded to the goalkeeper who was on the field at the start of play. Goalkeepers with no clean sheets not included in the list.

| Rank | No. | Nat. | Goalkeeper | NSL | NSL Cup | Total |
|---|---|---|---|---|---|---|
| 1 | 1 | (Australia) | Allan Maher | 10 | 0 | 10 |
| Total | | | | 10 | 0 | 10 |
