= 1977 Marconi Fairfield FC season =

Marconi Fairfield
1977 season
- Manager: Rale Rasic
- Stadium: Marconi Oval; Sydney Sports Ground
- National Soccer League: 2nd
- NSL Cup: Runners-up
- Top goalscorer: League: Peter Sharne (9); All: Peter Sharne (12)
- Highest home attendance: 9,580 vs. Sydney Olympic (12 June 1977); National Soccer League
- Lowest home attendance: 1,190 vs. Canberra City (3 October 1977); NSL Cup
- Average home league attendance: 3,959
- Biggest win: 8–1 vs. Fitzroy United (A) (18 June 1977); National Soccer League
- Biggest defeat: 0–4 vs. Adelaide City (H) (11 April 1977); National Soccer League
Home colours

The 1977 season is the first in the National Soccer League for Marconi Fairfield (now Marconi Stallions Football Club). In addition to the domestic league, Marconi Fairfield competed in the NSL Cup as runners-up.

== Transfers ==
=== Transfers in ===
Date	Position	Name	To	Fee	Ref.
10–16 January 1977	MF	Jimmy Rooney	(Australia) APIA Leichhardt	$20,000	

== Players ==
Note: Flags indicate national team as defined under FIFA eligibility rules; some limited exceptions apply. Players may hold more than one non-FIFA nationality.

No.	Pos.	Nation	Player
1	GK	AUS	Allan Maher
2		AUS	Barry Jones
3	DF	AUS	Paul Degney
4	DF	RSA	Les Hucker
5	DF	AUS	Ivo Prskalo
6	MF	AUS	Ray Richards
7	MF	AUS	Gary Byrne
8	FW	AUS	Ernie Campbell
9	MF	AUS	Jimmy Rooney

No.	Pos.	Nation	Player
10	FW	AUS	Raul Carrizo
11	MF	AUS	John Russell
12	FW	AUS	Berti Mariani
14	DF	IRL	Stuart Robertson
—	MF	AUS	Stuart Selvage
—	FW	AUS	Peter Sharne
—	FW	ITA	Roberto Vieri
—	DF	AUS	Richie Williams

== Pre-season and friendlies ==
Win Draw Loss

26–27 March 1977	Brisbane Lions (Australia)	1–1	(Australia) Marconi Fairfield
	Harland 58'		Mariani 2'	Attendance:

== Competitions ==
=== Overall record ===
Competition	First match	Last match	Starting round	Final position	Record							
Competition	First match	Last match	Starting round	Final position	Pld	W	D	L	GF	GA	GD	Win %
National Soccer League	3 April 1977	25 September 1977	Matchday 1	2nd	26	15	7	4	42	21	+21	57.69
NSL Cup	20 September 1977	9 October 1977	First round	Runners-up	4	3	1	0	10	4	+6	75.00
Total					30	18	8	4	52	25	+27	60.00

Source: Competitions

=== National Soccer League ===
==== League table ====
Pos	Team	Pld	W	D	L	GF	GA	GD	Pts
1	Eastern Suburbs (C)	26	13	11	2	52	28	+24	37
2	Marconi Fairfield	26	15	7	4	42	21	+21	37
3	Fitzroy United	26	12	8	6	41	34	+7	32
4	Adelaide City	26	12	7	7	50	31	+19	31
5	Western Suburbs	26	11	7	8	38	29	+9	29

Source: rsssf.com
Rules for classification: 1) Points; 2) Goal difference; 3) Goals scored
(C) Champions

==== Results summary ====
Overall								Home						Away					
Pld	W	D	L	GF	GA	GD	Pts	W	D	L	GF	GA	GD	W	D	L	GF	GA	GD
26	15	7	4	42	21	+21	52	6	5	2	12	7	+5	9	2	2	30	14	+16

Source: worldfootball.net

==== Results by round ====
Round	1	2	3	4	5	6	7	8	9	10	11	12	13	14	16	17	18	15	19	20	21	22	23	24	25	26
Ground	A	H	A	A	H	A	H	A	H	A	H	A	H	A	H	A	A	H	H	A	H	A	H	A	H	A
Result	W	L	W	W	W	W	W	D	D	D	D	W	W	L	D	D	W	W	W	W	L	L	W	W	D	W
Position	5	8	6	3	2	2	1	1	2	2	3	2	1	2	1	1	1	1	1	1	1	2	2	2	2	2
Points	2	2	4	6	8	10	12	13	14	15	16	18	20	20	21	22	24	26	28	30	30	30	32	34	35	37

Source: worldfootball.net
A = Away; H = Home; W = Win; D = Draw; L = Loss

==== Matches ====
Win Draw Loss

3 April 1977 1	Brisbane City	0–1	Marconi Fairfield	Brisbane
		Report	Sharne 83'	Stadium: Perry Park; Attendance: 5,124; Referee: Des Miles

11 April 1977 2	Marconi Fairfield	0–4	Adelaide City	Sydney
		Report	Leane 23'; J. Nyskohus 53', 70'; Matic 64'	Stadium: Marconi Oval; Attendance: 3,650; Referee: Bill Jones

16 April 1977 3	St George-Budapest	1–3	Marconi Fairfield	Sydney
	R. O'Shea 29'	Report	Campbell 15'; Robertson 20'; Byrne 73' (pen.)	Stadium: Sydney Sports Ground; Attendance: 3,500; Referee: Harold Hall

24 April 1977 4	Eastern Suburbs	2–4	Marconi Fairfield	Sydney
	Muniz 34' (pen.); Stevenson 88'	Report	Mariani 9'; Richards 10'; Byrne 54' (pen.); Campbell 71'	Stadium: Wentworth Park; Attendance: 2,563; Referee: John van der Lende

30 April 1977 5	Marconi Fairfield	3–0	South Melbourne	Sydney
	Sharne 7', 49'; Mariani 40'	Report		Stadium: Sydney Sports Ground; Attendance: 1,800; Referee: Tim Davies

7 May 1977 6	Mooroolbark	2–3	Marconi Fairfield	Melbourne
	Tront 21' (pen.); Pongho 31'	Report	Sharne 20'; Byrne 57' (pen.); Richards 78'	Stadium: Middle Park Soccer Stadium; Attendance: 1,100; Referee: Bob Henderson

15 May 1977 7	Marconi Fairfield	2–1	West Adelaide	Sydney
	Rooney 71'; Richards 77'	Report	McGregor 4'	Stadium: Marconi Oval; Attendance: 1,652; Referee: Tony Boskovic

22 May 1977 8	Brisbane Lions	1–1	Marconi Fairfield	Brisbane
	Morris 34'	Report	Campbell 31'	Stadium: Perry Park; Attendance: 4,263; Referee: Jack Wood

28 May 1977 9	Marconi Fairfield	0–0	Canberra City	Sydney
		Report		Stadium: Marconi Oval; Attendance: 2,243; Referee: Bill Jones

1 June 1977 10	Western Suburbs	1–1	Marconi Fairfield	Sydney
	Eaton 86'	Report	Rooney 70'	Stadium: Englefield Stadium; Attendance: 3,245; Referee: Ken Small

12 June 1977 11	Marconi Fairfield	0–0	Sydney Olympic	Sydney
		Report		Stadium: Marconi Oval; Attendance: 9,580; Referee: Harold Hall

18 June 1977 12	Fitzroy United	1–8	Marconi Fairfield	Melbourne
	Ken Taylor 84' (o.g.)	Report	Campbell 8', 65', 81'; Sharne 16', 72'; Degney 31'; Rooney 37'; Vieri 62'	Stadium: Middle Park Soccer Stadium; Attendance: 7,800; Referee: Graham Neal

26 June 1977 13	Marconi Fairfield	1–0	Footscray JUST	Sydney
	Milne 17' (o.g.)	Report		Stadium: Marconi Oval; Attendance: 5,200; Referee: Richard Lorenc

3 July 1977 14	Adelaide City	1–0	Marconi Fairfield	Adelaide
	J. Nyskohus 14'	Report		Stadium: Olympic Sports Field; Attendance: 13,132; Referee: Don Campbell

17 July 1977 16	Marconi Fairfield	1–1	Eastern Suburbs	Sydney
	Thomson 44' (o.g.)	Report	Manecas 45'	Stadium: Marconi Oval; Attendance: 5,835; Referee: Barry Wilkinson

23 July 1977 17	St George-Budapest	0–0	Marconi Fairfield	Sydney
		Report		Stadium: Marconi Oval; Attendance: 5,482; Referee: Richard Lorenc

30 July 1977 18	South Melbourne	1–2	Marconi Fairfield	Melbourne
	Mitten 42'	Report	Richards 20'; Rooney 29'	Stadium: Middle Park Soccer Stadium; Attendance: 3,000; Referee: David Yelland

5 August 1977 15	Marconi Fairfield	1–0	Brisbane City	Sydney
	Byrne 46'	Report		Stadium: Marconi Oval; Attendance: 2,784; Referee: Henry Witschge

7 August 1977 19	Marconi Fairfield	1–0	Mooroolbark	Sydney
	Mariani 42'	Report		Stadium: Marconi Oval; Attendance: 3,456; Referee: Bill Jones

19 August 1977 20	West Adelaide	0–1	Marconi Fairfield	Adelaide
		Report	Mariani 76'	Stadium: Hindmarsh Stadium; Attendance: 4,200; Referee: Dennis Stanley

21 August 1977 21	Marconi Fairfield	0–1	Brisbane Lions	Sydney
		Report	Fagan 24'	Stadium: Marconi Oval; Attendance: 2,453

31 August 1977 22	Canberra City	1–0	Marconi Fairfield	Queanbeyan
	Bourke 35'	Report		Stadium: Seiffert Oval; Attendance: 1,800; Referee: David Yelland

4 September 1977 23	Marconi Fairfield	3–0	Western Suburbs	Sydney
	Sharne 37'; Mariani 45', 71'	Report		Stadium: Marconi Oval; Attendance: 2,358; Referee: Tony Boskovic

11 September 1977 24	Sydney Olympic	0–2	Marconi Fairfield	Sydney
		Report	Rooney 16'; Sharne 41'	Stadium: Sydney Sports Ground; Attendance: 3,691; Referee: Richard Lorenc

18 September 1977 25	Marconi Fairfield	0–0	Fitzroy United	Sydney
		Report		Stadium: Marconi Oval; Attendance: 6,500; Referee: Brian Fowler

25 September 1977 26	Footscray JUST	3–4	Marconi Fairfield	Melbourne
	Nicolaides 82'; Vasic 88'; Picioane 89'	Report	Sharne 35'; Rooney 38', 47'; Mariani 68'	Stadium: Middle Park; Attendance: 4,000; Referee: David Yelland

=== NSL Cup ===
Win Draw Loss

20 September 1977 First round	Marconi Fairfield	1–0	Eastern Suburbs	Sydney
	Prskalo 25'	Report		Stadium: Marconi Oval; Attendance: 2,237; Referee: Richard Lorenc

3 October 1977 Quarter-finals	Marconi Fairfield	5–1	Canberra City	Sydney
	Mariani 25'; Rooney 44'; Sharne 58'; Byrne 75'; Campbell 87'	Report	Henderson 41'	Stadium: Sydney Sports Ground; Attendance: 1,190; Referee: Bill Jones

6 October 1977 Semi-finals	Fitzroy United	2–3	Marconi Fairfield	Melbourne
	Buljevic 10'; Cole 62'	Report	Mariani 26'; Campbell 61'; Sharne 88'	Stadium: Olympic Park; Attendance: 5,000

9 October 1977 Final	Brisbane City	1–1 (a.e.t.) (5–3 p)	Marconi Fairfield	Brisbane
	Tokesi 60'	Report	Sharne 40'	Stadium: Perry Park; Attendance: 7,000; Referee: Stewart Mellings

== Statistics ==
=== Appearances and goals ===
Includes all competitions. Players with no appearances not included in the list.

No.	Pos.	Nat.	Player	National Soccer League		NSL Cup		Total	
No.	Pos.	Nat.	Player	Apps	Goals	Apps	Goals	Apps	Goals
1	GK	(Australia)	Allan Maher	26	0	4	0	30	0
2	—	(Australia)	Barry Jones	14+2	0	1+1	0	18	0
3	DF	(Australia)	Paul Degney	26	1	4	0	30	1
4	DF	(South Africa)	Les Hucker	8+3	0	0	0	11	0
5	DF	(Australia)	Ivo Prskalo	26	0	4	1	30	1
6	MF	(Australia)	Ray Richards	25	4	4	0	29	4
7	MF	(Australia)	Gary Byrne	26	4	4	1	30	5
8	FW	(Australia)	Ernie Campbell	22+1	6	4	2	27	8
9	MF	(Australia)	Jimmy Rooney	26	7	4	1	30	8
10	FW	(Australia)	Raul Carrizo	3+3	0	0	0	6	0
11	MF	(Australia)	John Russell	16+1	0	4	0	21	0
12	FW	(Australia)	Berti Mariani	16+5	7	4	2	25	9
14	DF	(Republic of Ireland)	Stuart Robertson	14+3	1	3	0	20	1
—	MF	(Australia)	Stuart Selvage	2+1	0	0+1	0	4	0
—	FW	(Australia)	Peter Sharne	26	9	4	3	30	12
—	FW	(Italy)	Roberto Vieri	8	1	0	0	8	1
—	DF	(Australia)	Richie Williams	2+3	0	0+1	0	6	0

=== Disciplinary record ===
Includes all competitions. The list is sorted by squad number when total cards are equal. Players with no cards not included in the list.

Rank	No.	Pos.	Nat.	Player	National Soccer League			NSL Cup			Total		
Rank	No.	Pos.	Nat.	Player	Yellow card	Second yellow card	Red card	Yellow card	Second yellow card	Red card	Yellow card	Second yellow card	Red card
1	11	MF	(Australia)	John Russell	0	0	0	0	0	1	0	0	1
2	8	FW	(Australia)	Ernie Campbell	6	0	0	1	0	0	7	0	0
3	5	DF	(Australia)	Ivo Prskalo	2	0	0	0	0	0	2	0	0
3	6	MF	(Australia)	Ray Richards	1	0	0	1	0	0	2	0	0
3	7	MF	(Australia)	Gary Byrne	2	0	0	0	0	0	2	0	0
3	9	MF	(Australia)	Jimmy Rooney	2	0	0	0	0	0	2	0	0
7	1	GK	(Australia)	Allan Maher	1	0	0	0	0	0	1	0	0
7	2	—	(Australia)	Barry Jones	1	0	0	0	0	0	1	0	0
7	3	DF	(Australia)	Paul Degney	0	0	0	1	0	0	1	0	0
7	4	DF	(South Africa)	Les Hucker	1	0	0	0	0	0	1	0	0
Total					16	0	0	3	0	1	19	0	1

=== Clean sheets ===
Includes all competitions. The list is sorted by squad number when total clean sheets are equal. Numbers in parentheses represent games where both goalkeepers participated and both kept a clean sheet; the number in parentheses is awarded to the goalkeeper who was substituted on, whilst a full clean sheet is awarded to the goalkeeper who was on the field at the start of play. Goalkeepers with no clean sheets not included in the list.

Rank	No.	Nat.	Goalkeeper	NSL	NSL Cup	Total
1	1	(Australia)	Allan Maher	12	1	13
Total				12	1	13
