= 1978 Marconi Fairfield FC season =

Marconi Fairfield
1978 season
- Head Coach: Rale Rasic
- Stadium: Marconi Oval
- National Soccer League: 4th
- NSL Cup: First round
- Top goalscorer: League: Roberto Vieri (11); All: Roberto Vieri (11)
- Highest home attendance: 8,936 vs. Newcastle KB United (28 May 1978); National Soccer League
- Lowest home attendance: 3,000 vs. Footscray JUST (17 June 1978); National Soccer League
- Average home league attendance: 5,861
- Biggest win: 4–0 vs. Fitzroy United (H) (12 March 1978); National Soccer League; 6–2 vs. Western Suburbs (H) (16 April 1978); National Soccer League
- Biggest defeat: 0–4 vs. Adelaide City (A) (2 July 1978); National Soccer League

The 1978 season was the second in the National Soccer League for Marconi Fairfield (now Marconi Stallions Football Club). In addition to the domestic league, they also participated in the NSL Cup.

== Players ==
Note: Flags indicate national team as defined under FIFA eligibility rules; some limited exceptions apply. Players may hold more than one non-FIFA nationality.

No.	Pos.	Nation	Player
1	GK	AUS	Allan Maher
2		AUS	Barry Jones
3	DF	AUS	Paul Degney
4	MF	AUS	John Russell
5	DF	AUS	Ivo Prskalo
6	MF	AUS	Ray Richards
7	MF	AUS	Gary Byrne
8	FW	ITA	Roberto Vieri
9	MF	AUS	Jimmy Rooney (captain)

No.	Pos.	Nation	Player
10	FW	AUS	Berti Mariani
11	FW	AUS	Peter Sharne
12	DF	AUS	Richie Williams
13	MF	AUS	Stuart Selvage
14	FW	AUS	Mark Jankovics
15	DF	AUS	Peter Brogan
18	DF	ENG	Mike Berry
19	FW	AUS	Peter Ollerton
—		AUS	Telamo Domingo

== Competitions ==
=== Overall record ===
Competition	First match	Last match	Starting round	Final position	Record							
Competition	First match	Last match	Starting round	Final position	Pld	W	D	L	GF	GA	GD	Win %
National Soccer League	5 March 1978	27 August 1978	Matchday 1	4th	26	12	6	8	46	31	+15	46.15
NSL Cup	21 June 1978		First round	First round	1	0	1	0	0	0	+0	0.00
Total					27	12	7	8	46	31	+15	44.44

Source: Competitions

=== National Soccer League ===
==== League table ====
Pos	Team	Pld	W	D	L	GF	GA	GD	Pts	Qualification
2	Eastern Suburbs	26	15	5	6	49	27	+22	35	Qualification to Finals series (Note: The Finals series was not considered the championship for the 1978 National Soccer League.)
3	South Melbourne	26	12	8	6	45	30	+15	32	Qualification to Finals series
4	Marconi Fairfield	26	12	6	8	46	31	+15	30	Qualification to Finals series
5	Fitzroy United	26	9	8	9	39	39	0	26	
6	Brisbane Lions	26	8	10	8	37	39	−2	26	

Source: rsssf.com
Rules for classification: 1) Points; 2) Goal difference; 3) Goals scored

==== Results summary ====
Overall								Home						Away					
Pld	W	D	L	GF	GA	GD	Pts	W	D	L	GF	GA	GD	W	D	L	GF	GA	GD
26	12	6	8	46	31	+15	42	8	3	2	30	14	+16	4	3	6	16	17	−1

Source: worldfootball.net

==== Results by round ====
Round	1	2	3	4	5	6	7	8	9	10	11	12	13	14	15	16	17	18	19	20	21	22	23	24	25	26
Ground	A	H	A	H	H	A	H	A	H	A	H	A	H	A	H	H	A	A	H	A	H	A	H	A	H	A
Result	W	W	W	W	D	D	W	W	W	D	W	D	W	L	W	L	W	L	L	L	D	L	W	L	D	L
Position	2	1	1	1	1	1	1	1	1	1	1	1	1	1	1	1	1	1	1	2	3	4	2	4	3	4
Points	2	4	6	8	9	10	12	14	16	17	19	20	22	22	24	24	26	26	26	26	27	27	29	29	30	30

Source: worldfootball.net
A = Away; H = Home; W = Win; D = Draw; L = Loss

==== Matches ====
Win Draw Loss

5 March 1978 1	Brisbane Lions	0–3	Marconi Fairfield	Brisbane
		Report	Sharne 27'; Jankovics 47', 53'	Stadium: Perry Park; Attendance: 4,000; Referee: Des Miles (Col Amos 46')

12 March 1978 2	Marconi Fairfield	4–0	Fitzroy United	Sydney
15:00 AEDT	Vieri 15'; Rooney 40'; Jankovics 50'; Byrne 70'	Report		Stadium: Marconi Oval; Attendance: 5,891; Referee: Richard Lorenc

18 March 1978 3	Footscray JUST	0–2	Marconi Fairfield	Melbourne
		Report	Parrott 30' (o.g.); Mariani 51'	Stadium: Junction Oval; Attendance: 4,200; Referee: David Yelland

26 March 1978 4	Marconi Fairfield	3–2	Brisbane City	Sydney
15:00 AEDT	Jankovics 36'; Rooney 44'; Byrne 68' (pen.)	Report	Marley 12', 86'	Stadium: Marconi Oval; Attendance: 6,700; Referee: Tim Davies

2 April 1978 5	Marconi Fairfield	1–1	Adelaide City	Sydney
15:00 AEST	Byrne 44' (pen.)	Report	J. Nyskohus 40'	Stadium: Marconi Oval; Attendance: 6,608; Referee: Peter Rampley

9 April 1978 6	Eastern Suburbs	0–0	Marconi Fairfield	Sydney
		Report		Stadium: Wentworth Park; Attendance: 3,598; Referee: Barry Wilkinson

16 April 1978 7	Marconi Fairfield	6–2	Western Suburbs	Sydney
15:00 AEST	Vieri 9' (pen.), 71', 76' (pen.); Rooney 11'; Jankovics 63'; Mariani 70'	Report	Harding 15'; C. Eaton 16'	Stadium: Marconi Oval; Attendance: 5,719; Referee: Doug Rennie

23 April 1978 8	South Melbourne	0–3	Marconi Fairfield	Melbourne
		Report	Sharne 44'; Vieri 67' (pen.); Jankovics 89'	Stadium: Middle Park Soccer Stadium; Attendance: 17,728; Referee: Stewart Mellings

30 April 1978 9	Marconi Fairfield	2–0	West Adelaide	Sydney
15:00 AEST	Mariani 16'; Jankovics 48'	Report		Stadium: Marconi Oval; Attendance: 6,479; Referee: Richard Lorenc

6 May 1978 10	Canberra City	0–0	Marconi Fairfield	Canberra
15:00 AEST		Report		Stadium: Bruce Stadium; Attendance: 7,450; Referee: Henry Witschge

14 May 1978 11	Marconi Fairfield	2–1	St George-Budapest	Sydney
	Sharne 44'; Jankovics 46'	Report	O'Connor 46'	Stadium: Marconi Oval; Attendance: 8,093; Referee: Jim Reeves

21 May 1978 12	Sydney Olympic	1–1	Marconi Fairfield	Sydney
	Jamieson 40'	Report	Vieri 58'	Stadium: Wentworth Park; Attendance: 6,702; Referee: Tony Boskovic

28 May 1978 13	Marconi Fairfield	4–2	Newcastle KB United	Sydney
15:00 AEST	Mariani 19'; Sharne 62', 80'; Drinkwater 75' (o.g.)	Report	Galpin 5', 49'	Stadium: Marconi Oval; Attendance: 8,936; Referee: Doug Rennie

4 June 1978 14	Fitzroy United	4–1	Marconi Fairfield	Melbourne
	Buljevic 13'; Cole 27'; Campbell 44'; Bozikas 50'	Report	Richars 55'	Stadium: Olympic Park; Attendance: 12,000; Referee: Nick Karlich

11 June 1978 15	Marconi Fairfield	3–1	Brisbane Lions	Sydney
	Wilson 15' (o.g.); Neale 81' (o.g.); Vieri 87' (pen.)	Report	Morris 59'	Stadium: Marconi Oval; Attendance: 3,461; Referee: Tim Davies

17 June 1978 16	Marconi Fairfield	1–2	Footscray JUST	Sydney
	Rooney 72'	Report	Rujevic 73'; Nicolaides 87'	Stadium: Marconi Oval; Attendance: 3,000; Referee: Jim Reeves

25 June 1978 17	Brisbane City	0–3	Marconi Fairfield	Brisbane
		Report	Ollerton 62'; Vieri 74'; Sharne 89'	Stadium: Perry Park; Attendance: 3,550; Referee: Dave Nugent

2 July 1978 18	Adelaide City	4–0	Marconi Fairfield	Adelaide
	J. Nyskohus 35', 50'; Northcote 65'; Perin 85'	Report		Stadium: Olympic Sports Field; Attendance: 5,000; Referee: David Yelland

9 July 1978 19	Marconi Fairfield	1–2	Eastern Suburbs	Sydney
15:00 AEST	Ollerton 15'	Report	Stevenson 61' (pen.); Silva 76'	Stadium: Marconi Oval; Attendance: 5,731; Referee: Henry Witschge

16 July 1978 20	Western Suburbs	3–1	Marconi Fairfield	Sydney
	Fisher 23', 40'; Vernon 85'	Report	Vieri 41' (pen.)	Stadium: Wentworth Park; Attendance: 2,126; Referee: Tim Davies

23 July 1978 21	Marconi Fairfield	1–1	South Melbourne	Sydney
	Vieri 29' (pen.)	Report	Evans 10'	Stadium: Marconi Oval; Attendance: 5,813; Referee: Bill Jones

30 July 1978 22	West Adelaide	2–1	Marconi Fairfield	Adelaide
	Norris 21'; Pillans 55'	Report	Mariani 6'	Stadium: Hindmarsh Stadium; Attendance: 12,671; Referee: Stewart Melllings

6 August 1978 23	Marconi Fairfield	2–0	Canberra City	Sydney
	Mariani 50'; Jankoivcs 90'	Report		Stadium: Marconi Oval; Attendance: 4,519; Referee: Richard Lorenc

13 August 1978 24	St George-Budapest	2–1	Marconi Fairfield	Sydney
15:00 AEST	Morgan 2'; Coates 24'	Report	Vieri 56'	Stadium: St George Stadium; Attendance: 3,234; Referee: Peter Rampley

20 August 1978 25	Marconi Fairfield	0–0	Sydney Olympic	Sydney
		Report		Stadium: Marconi Oval; Attendance: 5,241; Referee: Tony Boskovic

27 August 1978 26	Newcastle KB United	1–0	Marconi Fairfield	Newcastle
14:30 AEST	Endacott 56'	Report		Stadium: Newcastle International Sports Centre; Attendance: 16,614; Referee: Richard Lorenc

==== Finals series ====
The Finals series was not considered the championship for the 1978 National Soccer League.

3 September 1978 Semi-finals	South Melbourne	2–3	Marconi Fairfield	Melbourne
	Cummings 41'; Evans 55'	Report	Jones 1'; Sharne 8'; Ollerton 44'	Stadium: Middle Park Soccer Stadium; Attendance: 6,200; Referee: Graham Neal

10 September 1978 Preliminary Final	Marconi Fairfield	2–0	West Adelaide	Sydney
	Mariani 61'; Sharne 81'	Report		Stadium: Marconi Oval; Attendance: 6,885; Referee: Chris Bambridge

17 September 1978 Grand Final	Eastern Suburbs	4–2	Marconi Fairfield	Sydney
	Smith 25'; Watson 38'; Trenter 41'; Campbell 44'	Report	Ollerton 23'; Vieri 60'	Stadium: Sydney Sports Ground; Attendance: 9,136; Referee: Don Campbell

=== NSL Cup ===
Win Draw Loss

21 June 1978 First round	Marconi Fairfield	0–0 (a.e.t.) (3–4 p)	(New South Wales) Sydney Croatia	Sydney
		Report		Stadium: Marconi Oval; Attendance: 4,175; Referee: Tim Davies

== Statistics ==
=== Appearances and goals ===
Includes all competitions. Players with no appearances not included in the list.

No.	Pos.	Nat.	Player	National Soccer League		NSL Cup		Total	
No.	Pos.	Nat.	Player	Apps	Goals	Apps	Goals	Apps	Goals
1	GK	(Australia)	Allan Maher	26	0	1	0	27	0
2	—	(Australia)	Barry Jones	19	0	0	0	19	0
3	DF	(Australia)	Paul Degney	26	0	0	0	26	0
4	MF	(Australia)	John Russell	26	0	1	0	27	0
5	DF	(Australia)	Ivo Prskalo	23	0	1	0	24	0
6	MF	(Australia)	Ray Richards	8+2	1	1	0	11	1
7	MF	(Australia)	Gary Byrne	11	3	1	0	12	3
8	FW	(Italy)	Roberto Vieri	24	11	1	0	25	11
9	MF	(Australia)	Jimmy Rooney	26	4	1	0	27	4
10	FW	(Australia)	Berti Mariani	26	6	1	0	27	6
11	FW	(Australia)	Peter Sharne	24+1	6	0	0	25	6
12	DF	(Australia)	Richie Williams	4+4	0	1	0	9	0
13	MF	(Australia)	Stuart Selvage	6+4	0	0+1	0	11	0
14	FW	(Australia)	Mark Jankovics	19+2	9	0	0	21	9
15	DF	(Australia)	Peter Brogan	5+4	0	1	0	10	0
18	DF	(Australia)	Mike Berry	1+3	0	1	0	5	0
19	FW	(Australia)	Peter Ollerton	10	2	0	0	10	2
—	—	(Australia)	Telamo Domingo	2	0	0	0	2	0

=== Disciplinary record ===
Includes all competitions. The list is sorted by squad number when total cards are equal. Players with no cards not included in the list.

Rank	No.	Pos.	Nat.	Player	National Soccer League			NSL Cup			Total		
Rank	No.	Pos.	Nat.	Player	Yellow card	Second yellow card	Red card	Yellow card	Second yellow card	Red card	Yellow card	Second yellow card	Red card
1	5	DF	(Australia)	Ivo Prskalo	4	0	1	0	0	0	4	0	1
1	6	MF	(Australia)	Ray Richards	4	0	1	0	0	0	4	0	1
3	8	FW	(Italy)	Roberto Vieri	2	0	0	0	0	0	2	0	0
3	19	FW	(Australia)	Peter Ollerton	2	0	0	0	0	0	2	0	0
5	1	GK	(Australia)	Allan Maher	1	0	0	0	0	0	1	0	0
5	2	DF	(Australia)	Barry Jones	1	0	0	0	0	0	1	0	0
5	3	MF	(Australia)	Paul Degney	1	0	0	0	0	0	1	0	0
5	7	MF	(Australia)	Gary Byrne	1	0	0	0	0	0	1	0	0
5	10	FW	(Australia)	Berti Mariani	1	0	0	0	0	0	1	0	0
5	11	FW	(Australia)	Peter Sharne	1	0	0	0	0	0	1	0	0
5	13	MF	(Australia)	Stuart Selvage	1	0	0	0	0	0	1	0	0
Total					19	0	2	0	0	0	19	0	2

=== Clean sheets ===
Includes all competitions. The list is sorted by squad number when total clean sheets are equal. Numbers in parentheses represent games where both goalkeepers participated and both kept a clean sheet; the number in parentheses is awarded to the goalkeeper who was substituted on, whilst a full clean sheet is awarded to the goalkeeper who was on the field at the start of play. Goalkeepers with no clean sheets not included in the list.

Rank	No.	Nat.	Goalkeeper	NSL	NSL Cup	Total
1	1	(Australia)	Allan Maher	10	1	11
Total				10	1	11
