= 1980 in Australian soccer =

Soccer in Australia
- Season: 1980

Men's soccer
- National Soccer League: Sydney City
- NSL Cup: Marconi Fairfield

The 1980 season was the eleventh season of national competitive soccer in Australia and 97th overall.

== National teams ==
=== Australia men's national soccer team ===
==== Results and fixtures ====
===== Friendlies =====
27 January 1980	Australia	0–4	Czechoslovakia	Canberra, Australia
		Report	Jurkemik 17'; Vízek 44'; Nehoda 82'; Kozák 89'	Stadium: Bruce Stadium; Attendance: 15,686; Referee: Chris Bambridge (Australia)

3 February 1980	Australia	0–5	Czechoslovakia	Sydney, Australia
		Report	Masný 46', 65'; Gajdůšek 58'; Kroupa 84'; Kozák 89'	Stadium: Sydney Cricket Ground; Attendance: 14,368; Referee: Tony Boskovic (Australia)

9 February 1980	Australia	2–2	Czechoslovakia	Melbourne, Australia
	Prskalo 9' (pen.); Krncevic 55'	Report	Dobiaš 11' (pen.); Nehoda 23'	Stadium: Olympic Park; Attendance: 15,000; Referee: Barry Harwood (Australia)

31 May 1980	Australia	1–2	England	Sydney, Australia
	Cole 88' (pen.)	Report	Hoddle 10'; Mariner 26'	Stadium: Sydney Cricket Ground; Attendance: 45,000; Referee: Tony Boskovic (Australia)

12 June 1980	Australia	1–2	Northern Ireland	Sydney, Australia
	Sharne 75'	Report	Nicholl 11'; J. O'Neull 53'	Stadium: Sydney Cricket Ground; Attendance: 12,000; Referee: Peter Rampley (Australia)

15 June 1980	Australia	1–1	Northern Ireland	Melbourne, Australia
	Sharne 20'	Report	M. O'Neill 84'	Stadium: Olympic Park; Attendance: 9,000; Referee: Stewart Mellings (Australia)

18 June 1980	Australia	1–2	Northern Ireland	Adelaide, Australia
	Sharne 5'	Report	Brotherston 70'; McCurdy 80'	Stadium: Hindmarsh Stadium; Attendance: 6,000; Referee: Don Campbell

24 August 1980	Australia	2–2	Mexico	Sydney, Australia
	Boden 57' (pen.); Yzendoorn 72'	Report	Castro 40'; González 83'	Stadium: Sydney Cricket Ground; Attendance: 4,800; Referee: Tony Boskovic (Australia)

26 August 1980	Australia	1–1	Mexico	Melbourne, Australia
	Cole 58'	Report	Castro 67'	Stadium: Olympic Park; Attendance: 8,000; Referee: Chris Bambridge (Australia)

11 November 1980	Greece	3–3	Australia	Athens, Greece
	Damanakis 25'; Domazos 67'; Delikaris 89' (pen.)	Report	Cole 24'; Barnes 84'; Selemidis 88'	Stadium: Panathinaikos Stadium; Attendance: 11,300; Referee: Vasilis Vourakis (Australia)

2 December 1980	Israel	0–1	Australia	Beersheba, Israel
		Report	Cole 28' (pen.)	Stadium: Municipal Stadium; Attendance: 5,000; Referee: Zvi Sharir (Israel)

5 December 1980	Hong Kong	1–0	Australia	Hong Kong
	Lau Wing Yip 85'	Report		Attendance: 9,548; Referee: Chan Tam Sum (Hong Kong)

7 December 1980	Indonesia	1–1	Australia	Jakarta, Indonesia
	Effendi 5'	Report	Henderson 13'	Stadium: Senayan Stadium; Attendance: 60,000; Referee: Kossain Katradiredja (Indonesia)

===== 1980 Oceania Cup =====
====== Group 2 ======
Pos	Team	Pld	W	D	L	GF	GA	GD	Pts	Qualification
1	Australia	3	3	0	0	20	2	+18	6	Advance to Final
2	New Caledonia	3	2	0	1	12	11	+1	4	Advance to Third place play-off
3	Papua New Guinea	3	1	0	2	6	22	−16	2	
4	New Hebrides	3	0	0	3	6	9	−3	0	

Source: Oceania Football Confederation

26 February 1980 2	Australia	11–2	Papua New Guinea	Nouméa, New Caledonia
	Moulis ?'; Bertogna ?'; V. Bozanic ?'; I. Hunter ?', ?', ?'; Krncevic ?'; Sharne ?', ?', ?', ?'	Report	Mouagi ?'; Torea ?'	Stadium: Nouméa Stadium

=== Australia women's national soccer team ===
==== Results and fixtures ====
===== Friendlies =====
18 May 1980 Trans-Tasman Cup	New Zealand	3–3	Australia	Auckland, New Zealand
	Leonidas ?'; Jacobsen ?'; Marshall ?'	Report	Heydon 32' (pen.); Bretnall 50'; Te Huia 70'	Stadium: University Park; Referee: Bill Munro (New Zealand)

21 May 1980 Trans-Tasman Cup	New Zealand	1–1	Australia	Wellington, New Zealand
	Sharpe ?'	Report	Brentnall 23'	Stadium: Newtown Park; Referee: Jim Selby (Australia)

24 May 1980 Trans-Tasman Cup	New Zealand	2–3	Australia	Christchurch, New Zealand
	Jacobsen ?' (pen.); Grant ?'	Report	Brentnall 9', 20', 51'	Stadium: Queen Elizabeth II Park; Referee: Jim Selby (Australia)

=== Australia men's national under-20 soccer team ===
==== 1980 OFC U-20 Championship ====
===== Group A =====
Pos	Team	Pld	W	D	L	GF	GA	GD	Pts	Qualification
1	Australia	2	2	0	0	7	1	+6	4	Advance to Final
2	New Caledonia	2	1	0	1	3	7	−4	2	Advance to Third place play-off
3	Tahiti	2	0	0	2	1	3	−2	0	

Source: RSSSF

6 December 1980	Australia	1–0	Tahiti	Fiji
		Report

11 December 1980	New Caledonia	1–6	Australia	Fiji
		Report

===== Final =====
13 December 1980	New Zealand	2–0	Australia	Fiji
		Report

== Domestic soccer ==
=== National Soccer League ===
Pos	Team	Pld	W	D	L	GF	GA	GD	Pts	Qualification or relegation
1	Sydney City (C)	26	16	5	5	51	26	+25	37	Qualification to Finals series (Note: The Finals series was not considered the championship for the 1980 National Soccer League.)
2	Heidelberg United	26	15	6	5	55	33	+22	36	Qualification to Finals series
3	South Melbourne	26	15	5	6	42	21	+21	35	Qualification to Finals series
4	Marconi Fairfield	26	14	6	6	53	32	+21	34	Qualification to Finals series
5	Adelaide City	26	13	4	9	40	27	+13	30	
6	Newcastle KB United	26	12	6	8	32	31	+1	30	
7	Brisbane Lions	26	7	11	8	28	32	−4	25	
8	APIA Leichhardt	26	8	7	11	27	35	−8	23	
9	Footscray JUST	26	7	9	10	32	41	−9	23	
10	Canberra City	26	7	7	12	34	33	+1	21	
11	Blacktown City	26	9	3	14	34	55	−21	21	
12	Brisbane City	26	4	10	12	29	36	−7	18	
13	West Adelaide	26	7	3	16	24	46	−22	17	
14	St George-Budapest (R)	26	5	4	17	32	65	−33	14	Relegated to the 1981 NSW State League

Updated to match(es) played on unknown. Source: rsssf.com
Rules for classification: 1) points; 2) goal difference; 3) number of goals scored.
(C) Champions; (R) Relegated

=== NSL Cup ===
==== Final ====
4 October 1980

Heidelberg United	0–0 (a.e.t.)	Marconi Fairfield
	Report

Olympic Park, Melbourne
Attendance: 6,388
Referee: Jack Johnston
15 October 1980
19:30 AEDT

Marconi Fairfield	3–0	Heidelberg United
Byrne 17' (pen.); Krncevic 64'; Sharne 87'	Report

Marconi Oval, Sydney
Attendance: 5,179
Referee: Jack Johnston
