= 1980 National Soccer League =

Australian soccer season

National Soccer League
- Season: 1980
- Dates: 9 March – 28 September 1980
- Champions: Sydney City; 2nd National Soccer League title
- Relegated: St George-Budapest
- Matches: 182
- Goals: 513 (2.82 per match)
- Top goalscorer: Gary Cole (21 goals)
- Biggest home win: Marconi Fairfield 9–0 Blacktown City (16 March 1980)
- Biggest away win: APIA Leichhardt 0–5 Heidelberg United (17 June 1979)
- Highest scoring: Marconi Fairfield 9–0 Blacktown City (16 March 1980)
- Longest winning run: 5 matches Heidelberg United; Marconi Fairfield; Sydney City
- Longest unbeaten run: 10 matches Marconi Fairfield
- Longest winless run: 14 matches Brisbane Lions
- Longest losing run: 5 matches Blacktown City; West Adelaide
- Highest attendance: 15,000; Heielberg United 1–2 South Melbourne (6 July 1980)
- Lowest attendance: 800; Footscray JUST 0–1 Canberra City (28 June 1980)
- Total attendance: 670,068
- Average attendance: 3,682

The 1980 National Soccer League season was the fourth season of the National Soccer League in Australia. The champions were Sydney City SC, their second title after winning the 1977 season (as Eastern Suburbs).

== Teams ==
Fourteen teams competed in the league.

=== Stadiums and locations ===
Note: Table lists in alphabetical order.

Team	Location	Stadium	Capacity
Adelaide City	Adelaide (Norwood)	Olympic Sports Field	8,000
APIA Leichhardt	Sydney (Leichhardt)	Lambert Park	7,000
Blacktown City	Sydney (Seven Hills)	Gabbie Stadium	5,000
Brisbane City	Brisbane (Newmarket)	Spencer Park	5,000
Brisbane Lions	Brisbane (Inala)	Lions Stadium	5,000
Canberra City	Canberra	Canberra Stadium	25,011
Footscray JUST	Melbourne (Footscray)	Schintler Reserve	?
Heidelberg United	Melbourne (Brunswick)	Olympic Village	12,000
Marconi Fairfield	Sydney (Bossley Park)	Marconi Stadium	9,000
Newcastle KB United	Newcastle	Newcastle International Sports Centre	30,000
South Melbourne	Melbourne (Middle Park)	Middle Park	18,000
St George-Budapest	Sydney (Mortdale)	St George Stadium	12,000
Sydney City	Sydney (Bondi)	ES Marks Athletics Field	8,000
West Adelaide	Adelaide (City of Adelaide)	Hindmarsh Stadium	16,500

== League table ==
Pos	Team	Pld	W	D	L	GF	GA	GD	Pts	Qualification or relegation
1	Sydney City (C)	26	16	5	5	51	26	+25	37	Qualification to Finals series (Note: The Finals series was not considered the championship for the 1980 National Soccer League.)
2	Heidelberg United	26	15	6	5	55	33	+22	36	Qualification to Finals series
3	South Melbourne	26	15	5	6	42	21	+21	35	Qualification to Finals series
4	Marconi Fairfield	26	14	6	6	53	32	+21	34	Qualification to Finals series
5	Adelaide City	26	13	4	9	40	27	+13	30	
6	Newcastle KB United	26	12	6	8	32	31	+1	30	
7	Brisbane Lions	26	7	11	8	28	32	−4	25	
8	APIA Leichhardt	26	8	7	11	27	35	−8	23	
9	Footscray JUST	26	7	9	10	32	41	−9	23	
10	Canberra City	26	7	7	12	34	33	+1	21	
11	Blacktown City	26	9	3	14	34	55	−21	21	
12	Brisbane City	26	4	10	12	29	36	−7	18	
13	West Adelaide	26	7	3	16	24	46	−22	17	
14	St George-Budapest (R)	26	5	4	17	32	65	−33	14	Relegated to the 1981 NSW State League

Updated to match(es) played on unknown. Source: rsssf.com
Rules for classification: 1) points; 2) goal difference; 3) number of goals scored.
(C) Champions; (R) Relegated

== Results ==
Home \ Away	ADE	API	BLA	BRC	BRL	CAN	FOO	HEI	MAR	NKU	SOU	STG	SYC	WES
Adelaide City	—		3–2	1–1	0–0	1–1	4–1	1–0	0–1	1–3	0–1	6–1	1–0	1–0
APIA Leichhardt	2–1	—	0–0	2–1	0–0	2–1	0–0	0–5	2–2	1–0	1–0	1–2	2–2	2–0
Blacktown City	1–2	0–0	—	3–1	4–1	1–0	3–0	1–2	5–1	1–1	0–3	4–2	1–3	1–0
Brisbane City	1–2	1–0	1–2	—	1–1	1–1	1–1	7–0	2–1	1–2	0–1	0–1	1–0	1–1
Brisbane Lions	1–2	2–1	1–0	1–0	—	0–0	1–1	1–2	0–0	1–4	1–2	0–0	2–0	2–1
Canberra City	1–0	2–2	0–1	1–1	2–4	—	0–0	0–1	0–1	1–2	0–0	4–1	2–3	4–3
Footscray JUST	1–3	1–0	3–0	1–1	3–1	0–1	—	0–2	0–4	2–1	3–0	5–3	1–2	0–3
Heidelberg United	0–0	5–1	5–1	3–1	1–0	2–0	3–2	—	3–3	4–0	1–2	4–2	0–0	4–2
Marconi Fairfield	2–1	1–2	9–0	4–0	2–1	3–2	2–2	1–1	—	4–1	1–4	0–0	2–0	2–1
Newcastle KB United	3–1	1–0	1–0	1–1	0–0	0–4	0–0	3–1	0–1	—	1–0	2–1	0–3	2–0
South Melbourne	2–1	1–0	5–0	3–3	2–2	1–0	3–0	0–0	3–1	0–0	—	2–1	1–2	2–0
St George-Budapest	1–4	1–0	4–1	1–1	2–3	1–5	1–1	3–5	0–3	0–3	0–3	—	0–2	3–1
Sydney City	2–1	4–2	3–0	2–1	1–1	0–2	2–2	1–1	2–1	2–0	2–1	4–1	—	7–0
West Adelaide	0–2	0–4	4–2	1–0	1–1	2–0	0–2	1–0	0–1	1–1	1–0	1–0	0–2	—

Source: OzFootball
Legend: Blue = home team win; Yellow = draw; Red = away team win.

== Finals series ==
The Finals series was not considered the championship for the 1980 National Soccer League.

Semi-finals
1	Sydney City	2
2	Heidelberg United	0
3	South Melbourne	4
4	Marconi Fairfield	3

Preliminary final
2	Heidelberg United	4
3	South Melbourne	1

Grand final
1	Sydney City	0
2	Heidelberg United	4

=== Semi-finals ===
11 October 1980 Qualifying final	Sydney City	2–0	Heidelberg United	Sydney
	Trenter 35'; Boden 39' (pen.)	Report		Stadium: Sydney Sports Ground; Attendance: 3,457; Referee: Tony Boskovic

12 October 1980 Elimination final	South Melbourne	4–3	Marconi Fairfield	Melbourne
	Evans 49', 82'; Xanthopoulos 75'; Buljevic 80'	Report	Sharne 10'; Byrne 19' (pen.); Krncevic 41'	Stadium: Middle Park Soccer Stadium; Attendance: 4,500; Referee: Chris Bambridge

=== Preliminary final ===
18 October 1980	Heidelberg United	4–1	South Melbourne	Melbourne
	Paton 5', 85'; Bozikas 26'; Cole 67' (pen.)	Report	Buljevic 9'	Stadium: Olympic Park; Attendance: 7,700; Referee: Tim Davies

=== Grand final ===
26 October 1980

Sydney City	0–4	Heidelberg United
	Report	Cole 32', 43' (pen.), 77'; Paton 87'

Bruce Stadium, Canberra
Attendance: 11,126
Referee: Don Campbell

== Season statistics ==
=== Top scorers ===
Rank	Player	Club	Goals
1	(Australia) Gary Cole	Heidelberg United	21
2	(Australia) Mark Jankovics	Marconi Fairfield	16
3	(Australia) Jamie Paton	Heidelberg United	15
4	(Australia) Ken Boden	Sydney City	13
4	(Australia) Eddie Krncevic	Marconi Fairfield	13
6	(Australia) John Nyskohus	Adelaide City	12
7	(Australia) Dennis Duarte	St George-Budapest	11
8	(Australia) Murray Barnes	Sydney City	10
8	(Australia) Branko Buljevic	South Melbourne	10
8	(Australia) Phil O'Connor	APIA Leichhardt	10

==== Hat-tricks ====
Player	For	Against	Result	Date
(Australia) Gary Cole	Heidelberg United	West Adelaide	4–2 (H)	16 March 1980
(Australia) Eddie Krncevic	Marconi Fairfield	Blacktown City	9–0 (H)	16 March 1980
(Australia) Mark Jankovics	Marconi Fairfield	Blacktown City	9–0 (H)	16 March 1980
(Australia) Gary Cole	Heidelberg United	APIA Leichhardt	5–0 (A)	6 April 1980
(Australia) Murray Barnes	Sydney City	West Adelaide	7–0 (H)	6 April 1980
(Australia) Gary Cole	Heidelberg United	Blacktown City	3–1 (H)	13 April 1980
(Australia) John Nyskohus	Adelaide City	St George-Budapest	4–1 (A)	13 April 1980
(Australia) Barry Kelso	Brisbane City	Heidelberg United	7–0 (H)	27 July 1980
(Australia) Dennis Duarte	St George-Budapest	West Adelaide	3–1 (H)	28 September 1980

=== Clean sheets ===
Rank	Player	Club	Clean sheets
1	(Australia) Peter Laumets	South Melbourne	12
2	(Australia) Allan Maher	Marconi Fairfield	10
3	(Australia) Peter Marshall	Adelaide City	8
3	(Australia) Greg Woodhouse	APIA Leichhardt	8
5	(Scotland) Dennis Boland	Footscray JUST	7
6	(Australia) Martyn Crook	West Adelaide	6
6	(New Zealand) Tony Scalan	Brisbane Lions	6
6	(New Zealand) Richard Wilson	Canberra City	6
9	(Australia) Yakka Banovic	Heidelberg United	5
9	(New Zealand) Phil Dando	Newcastle KB United	5

=== Discipline ===
==== Player ====
- Most yellow cards: 7
  - (South Africa) Paul Ontong (Brisbane Lions)
  - (Australia) Warren Turnbull (Blacktown City)
- Most red cards: 2
  - (Australia) Eddie Krncevic (Marconi Fairfield)

==== Club ====
- Most yellow cards: 30
  - Footscray JUST
  - St George-Budapest
- Fewest yellow cards: 13
  - Heidelberg United
- Most red cards: 3
  - West Adelaide
- Fewest red cards: 0
  - Adelaide City
  - Brisbane Lions
  - Heidelberg United

== Awards ==
=== Annual awards ===
Award	Winner	Club
National Soccer League Player of the Year	(Scotland) Jim Hermiston	Brisbane Lions
National Soccer League Under 21 Player of the Year	(Australia) John Spanos	Sydney City
National Soccer League Coach of the Year	(Australia) John Margeritis	South Melbourne
