= National Soccer League Player of the Year =

- Awarded for: The best player in each given NSL season
- Country: Australia
- First award: 1977
- Final award: 1989

Highlights
- Most awards: Frank Farina and Bobby Russell (2)

The National Soccer League Player of the Year was an annual soccer award present to the most outstanding player in Australia's National Soccer League. The award was established in the NSL's first season in 1977 and it ran until 1989. The following season it was replaced by the Johnny Warren Medal.

The inaugural winner was Jimmy Rooney of Marconi, who finished second that season. The last winner of the award was Zlatko Nastevski, who played for table-toppers Marconi when he won the award. Bobby Russell and Frank Farina are the only people to have won the award twice.

From 1977 until 1985 the vote was purely done by referees. Then, between 1986 and 1988, two winners were announced, one voted by the referees and one voted by the players. In 1989, it was only the players voting.

== Winners ==
Season	Player	Nationality	Club	Ref
1977	Jimmy Rooney	Australia	Marconi	
1978	Ken Boden	Australia	Newcastle United	
1979	Ivo Prskalo	Australia	Marconi	
1980	Jim Hermiston	Scotland	Brisbane Lions	
1981	Bobby Russell	Australia	Adelaide City	
1982	Peter Katholos	Australia	Sydney Olympic	
1983	Joe Watson	Australia	Sydney City	
1984	Sergio Melta	Australia	Adelaide City	
1985	Graham Honeyman	Australia	West Adelaide	
1986	Bobby Russell† (2)	Australia	South Melbourne	
1986	Graham Arnold*	Australia	Sydney Croatia	
1987	Andrew Zinni†	Australia	Brunswick Juventus	
1987	Frank Farina*	Australia	Marconi	
1988	Paul Wade†	Australia	South Melbourne	
1988	Frank Farina* (2)	Australia	Marconi	
1989	Zlatko Nastevski	Australia	Marconi	

* Player-voted award † Referee-voted award

== Multiple winners ==
Awards	Player	Team	Seasons
2	(Australia) Bobby Russell	Adelaide City / South Melbourne	1981, 1986
2	(Australia) Frank Farina	Marconi	1987, 1988

== Awards won by club ==
Club	Wins
Marconi	5
Adelaide City	2
South Melbourne	2
Brisbane Lions	1
Brunswick Juventus	1
Newcastle United	1
Sydney City	1
Sydney Croatia	1
Sydney Olympic	1
West Adelaide	1
