= List of NSL champions =

This is a list of National Soccer League (NSL) champions. The NSL was the elite football (soccer) competition in Australia from 1977 until 2004, when the competition was scrapped and replaced in 2005 by the fully professional A-League.

== National Soccer League Champions ==
From 1977 until 1983, the winner was the top placed team at the end of the season. From 1984 until 1986, the competition was split into two conferences, with playoffs to decide two grand finalists who met over two legs. In 1987 the system reverted to the pre 1984 system. From 1988 until the demise of the league in 2004, various playoff systems were used to decide the champion.

Season	Grand Final Date	Winning Team	Score	Losing Team	Location	GF Attendance	Joe Marston Medal
1977	—	Sydney City (1)	By Table	Marconi Stallions	—	—	—
1978	—	West Adelaide (1)	By Table	Sydney City	—	—	—
1979	—	Marconi Stallions (1)	By Table	Heidelberg United	—	—	—
1980	—	Sydney City (2)	By Table	Heidelberg United	—	—	—
1981	—	Sydney City (3)	By Table	South Melbourne	—	—	—
1982	—	Sydney City (4)	By Table	St George	—	—	—
1983	—	St George (1)	By Table	Sydney City	—	—	—
1984	24 October 1984	South Melbourne (1)	2–1	Sydney Olympic	Olympic Park, Melbourne (1)	10,000	—
1984	28 October 1984	South Melbourne (1)	1–2	Sydney Olympic	St. George Stadium, Sydney (1)	11,221	—
1985	4 September 1985	Brunswick Juventus (1)	0–1	Sydney City	St. George Stadium, Sydney (2)	2,491	—
1985	8 September 1985	Brunswick Juventus (1)	1–0	Sydney City	Olympic Park, Melbourne (2)	7,560	—
1986	12 October 1986	Adelaide City (1)	0–1	Sydney Olympic	Hindmarsh Stadium, Adelaide (1)	12,232	—
1986	19 October 1986	Adelaide City (1)	3–1	Sydney Olympic	Parramatta Stadium, Sydney (1)	14,032	—
1987	—	APIA Leichhardt (1)	By Table	Preston Lions	—	—	—
1988	4 September 1988	Marconi Stallions (2)	2–2 (5–4 Penalties)	Sydney United	Parramatta Stadium, Sydney (2)	17,064	—
1989	13 August 1989	Marconi Stallions (3)	1–0 (a.e.t.)	Sydney Olympic	Parramatta Stadium, Sydney (3)	23,387	—
1989–90	20 May 1990	Sydney Olympic (1)	2–0	Marconi Stallions	Parramatta Stadium, Sydney (4)	26,353	(Australia) Abbas Saad (Sydney Olympic)
1990–91	5 May 1991	South Melbourne (2)	1–1 (5–4 Penalties)	Melbourne Knights	Olympic Park, Melbourne (3)	21,338	(Croatia) Josip Biskic (Melbourne Knights)
1991–92	3 May 1992	Adelaide City (2)	0–0 (4–2 Penalties)	Melbourne Knights	Olympic Park, Melbourne (4)	15,463	(Australia) Alex Tobin (Adelaide City)
1992–93	16 May 1993	Marconi Stallions (4)	1–0	Adelaide City	Parramatta Stadium, Sydney (5)	13,376	(Australia) Milan Ivanovic (Adelaide City)
1993–94	1 May 1994	Adelaide City (3)	1–0	Melbourne Knights	Olympic Park, Melbourne (5)	13,790	(Australia) Alex Tobin (Adelaide City)
1994–95	7 May 1995	Melbourne Knights (1)	2–0	Adelaide City	Hindmarsh Stadium, Adelaide (2)	15,573	(Australia) Steve Horvat (Melbourne Knights)
1995–96	26 May 1996	Melbourne Knights (2)	2–1	Marconi Stallions	Olympic Park, Melbourne (6)	14,258	(Australia) Andrew Marth (Melbourne Knights)
1996–97	25 May 1997	Brisbane Strikers (1)	2–0	Sydney United	Lang Park, Brisbane (1)	40,446	(Australia) Alan Hunter (Brisbane Strikers)
1997–98	16 May 1998	South Melbourne (3)	2–1	Carlton S.C.	Olympic Park, Melbourne (7)	16,000	(Australia) Fausto De Amicis (South Melbourne)
1998–99	30 May 1999	South Melbourne (4)	3–2	Sydney United	Olympic Park, Melbourne (8)	15,194	(Australia) Goran Lozanovski (South Melbourne)
1999–2000	11 June 2000	Wollongong Wolves (1)	3–3 (7–6 Penalties)	Perth Glory	Subiaco Oval, Perth (1)	43,242	(Australia) Scott Chipperfield (Wollongong Wolves)
2000–01	3 June 2001	Wollongong Wolves (2)	2–1	South Melbourne	Parramatta Stadium, Sydney (6)	13,402	(Australia) Matthew Horsley (Wollongong Wolves)
2001–02	12 May 2002	Sydney Olympic (2)	1–0	Perth Glory	Subiaco Oval, Perth (2)	42,735	(Australia) Ante Milicic (Sydney Olympic)
2002–03	1 June 2003	Perth Glory (1)	2–0	Sydney Olympic	Subiaco Oval, Perth (3)	38,111	(Australia) Simon Colosimo (Perth Glory)
2003–04	4 April 2004	Perth Glory (2)	1–0 (a.e.t.)	Parramatta Power	Parramatta Stadium, Sydney (7)	9,630	(Australia) Ahmad Elrich (Parramatta Power)

The numbers in brackets indicate the number of championships won by a team, or the number of Grand Finals held in a city.

== Playoff Series Champions ==
From 1977–1983 and 1987, the top placed team at the end of the regular season was declared champion. However a compromise format was devised between the traditional first past the post system and the Australian system of finals. A Playoff series was conducted in these years except for the 1977, 1981 & 1983 seasons, however the winner of the Playoff Series didn't become champion of the NSL.

Season	Grand Final Date	Winning Team	Score	Losing Team	Location	GF Attendance
1978	17 September 1978	Sydney City (1)	4–2	Marconi Stallions	Sydney Sports Ground, Sydney (1)	9,136
1979	28 October 1979; 4 November 1979	Sydney City (2)	1–0; 1–1	Brisbane City	Wentworth Park, Sydney (1); Perry Park, Brisbane (1)	2,532; 4,200
1980	26 October 1980	Heidelberg United (1)	4–0	Sydney City	Canberra Stadium, Canberra (1)	11,126
1982	3 October 1982	St George (1)	3–1	Sydney City	Penrith Stadium, Sydney (1)	6,495
1987	1 November 1987	St George (2)	4–0	APIA Leichhardt	Parramatta Stadium, Sydney (1)	6,961

The numbers in brackets indicate the number of playoff series won by a team, or the number of Grand Finals held in a city.

== NSL Cup Winners ==
The NSL also held a cup competition, which was held initially during the regular season, before gradually becoming a pre-season warm-up tournament. It was discontinued after the 1996–97 season.

Season	Cup Final Date	Winning Team	Score	Losing Team	Location	Cup Final Attendance
1977	9 October 1977	Brisbane City (1)	1–1 (5–3 Penalties)	Marconi Stallions	Perry Park, Brisbane (1)	9,000
1978	8 October 1978	Brisbane City (2)	2–1	Adelaide City	Perry Park, Brisbane (2)	6,964
1979	30 September 1979	Adelaide City (1)	3–1	St George	Olympic Sports Field, Adelaide (1)	9,554
1980	5 October 1980; 15 October 1980	Marconi Stallions (1)	0–0 (a.e.t.); 3–0 (Replay)	Heidelberg United	Olympic Park, Melbourne (1); Marconi Stadium, Sydney (1)	7,000; 5,000
1981	20 September 1981	Brisbane Lions (1)	3–1	West Adelaide	Canberra Stadium, Canberra (1)	6,132
1982	12 September 1982	APIA Leichhardt (1)	2–1	Heidelberg United	Olympic Park, Melbourne (2)	7,000
1983	6 November 1983; 13 November 1983	Sydney Olympic (1)	1–0; 1–0	Heidelberg United	St. George Stadium, Sydney (1); Olympic Park, Melbourne (3)	9,420; 6,000
1984	13 September 1984	Newcastle Rosebud United (1)	1–0	Melbourne Knights	Olympic Park, Melbourne (4)	5,000
1985	11 August 1985	Sydney Olympic (2)	2–1	Preston Lions	St. George Stadium, Sydney (2)	11,187
1986	17 September 1986	Sydney City (1)	3–2 (a.e.t.)	West Adelaide	Hindmarsh Stadium, Adelaide (1)	5,200
1987	14 October 1987; 18 October 1987	Sydney United (1)	1–0; 1–0	South Melbourne	St. George Stadium, Sydney (3); Olympic Park, Melbourne (5)	5,845; 6,000
1988	14 August 1988	APIA Leichhardt (2)	0–0 (5–3 Penalties)	Brunswick Juventus	Marconi Stadium, Sydney (2)	5,200
1989	20 August 1989	Adelaide City (2)	2–0	Sydney Olympic	Hindmarsh Stadium, Adelaide (2)	10,000
1989–90	25 April 1990	South Melbourne (1)	4–1	Sydney Olympic	Olympic Park, Melbourne (6)	7,000
1990–91	7 April 1991	Parramatta Eagles (1)	1–0	Preston Lions	Marconi Stadium, Sydney (3)	8,749
1991–92	7 April 1992	Adelaide City (3)	2–1	Marconi Stallions	Hindmarsh Stadium, Adelaide (3)	6,500
1992–93	18 April 1993	Heidelberg United (1)	2–0	Parramatta Eagles	Marconi Stadium, Sydney (4)	4,596
1993–94	17 October 1993	Parramatta Eagles (2)	2–0	Sydney United	Marconi Stadium, Sydney (5)	5,156
1994–95	16 October 1994	Melbourne Knights (1)	6–0	Heidelberg United	Olympic Park, Melbourne (7)	6,000
1995–96	27 January 1996	South Melbourne (2)	3–1	Newcastle Breakers	Lakeside Stadium, Melbourne (1)	5,000
1996–97	6 October 1996	Collingwood Warriors (1)	1–0	Marconi Stallions	Lakeside Stadium, Melbourne (2)	2,327

The numbers in brackets indicate the number of cups won by a team, or the number of Cup Finals held in a city.

== National Youth League ==
The NSL also had a national youth competition, consisting of a variety teams, both from within and outside of the NSL's membership. The competition began in 1984, and was ended at the same time as the NSL, in 2004.

Year	Champion	Score	Runner up	Venue
1984	South Melbourne Hellas	3–2	Melita Eagles	
1985	Sydney City	3–0	Heidelberg Alexander	
1986	Australian Institute of Sport	3–0	Sunshine George Cross	
1987	Sydney Olympic	1–0	Sunshine George Cross	
1988	Marconi	2–1	Sunshine George Cross	
1989	Sunshine George Cross	3–2	Marconi	
1989–1990	Melbourne Croatia	2–1	APIA Leichhardt	
1990–1991	South Melbourne	3–2	Sydney Olympic	
1991–1992	Sydney Croatia	3–1	South Melbourne	
1992–1993	West Adelaide	1–0	Australian Institute of Sport	
1993–1994	South Melbourne	2–0	Sydney United	
1994–1995	Sydney United	1–0	Melbourne Knights	
1995–1996	Marconi Stallions	3–1	West Adelaide	
1996–1997	Melbourne Knights	1–0	Sydney United	
1997–1998	Australian Institute of Sport	4–1	Adelaide City	
1998–1999	Australian Institute of Sport	8–1	Adelaide City	Knights Stadium
1999–2000	Carlton	1–0	Parramatta Power	
2000–2001	Melbourne Knights	3–2	Marconi Stallions	
2001–2002	Parramatta Power	2–0	Melbourne Knights	
2002–2003	Parramatta Power	6–2	Whittlesea Stallions	
2003–2004	Canberra Deakin	2–1	South Melbourne	

== See also ==
- List of A-League honours
- List of Australian soccer champions
