= 1979 National Soccer League =

Australian soccer season

National Soccer League
- Season: 1979
- Dates: 9 March – 4 November 1979
- Champions: Marconi Fairfield; 1st National Soccer League title
- Relegated: Sydney Olympic
- Matches: 182
- Goals: 488 (2.68 per match)
- Top goalscorer: Mark Jankovics (18 goals)
- Biggest home win: Marconi Fairfield 6–0 South Melbourne (22 April 1979)
- Biggest away win: Brisbane Lions 0–6 Adelaide City (17 June 1979)
- Highest scoring: Marconi Fairfield 4–4 Adelaide City (1 April 1979); Heidelberg United 6–2 Brisbane City (19 October 1979)
- Longest winning run: 5 matches Sydney City
- Longest unbeaten run: 10 matches Heidelberg United; Marconi Fairfield
- Longest winless run: 10 matches Canberra City
- Longest losing run: 5 matches St George-Budapest; Sydney Olympic
- Highest attendance: 18,376; Newcastle KB United 2–0 Sydney Olympic (14 April 1979)
- Lowest attendance: 500; Sydney City 1–1 Brisbane Lions (22 August 1979); Heidelberg United 6–2 Brisbane City (19 October 1979)
- Total attendance: 777,635
- Average attendance: 4,273

The 1979 National Soccer League was the third season of the National Soccer League, the former top Australian semi-professional league for association football clubs since its establishment in 1977. Marconi Fairfield secured a first National Soccer League title.

== League table ==
Pos	Team	Pld	W	D	L	GF	GA	GD	Pts	Qualification or relegation
1	Marconi Fairfield (C)	26	15	6	5	58	32	+26	40 (Note: A Bonus Point was awarded for victories of 4 goals or more.)	Qualification to Finals series (Note: The Finals series was not considered the championship for the 1979 National Soccer League.)
2	Heidelberg United	26	14	7	5	44	30	+14	36	Qualification to Finals series
3	Sydney City	26	15	3	8	47	29	+18	34	Qualification to Finals series
4	Brisbane City	26	14	5	7	38	30	+8	34	Qualification to Finals series
5	Adelaide City	26	13	6	7	43	27	+16	33	
6	Newcastle KB United	26	11	9	6	43	30	+13	32	
7	West Adelaide	26	10	4	12	28	31	−3	25	
8	APIA Leichhardt	26	11	3	12	29	37	−8	25	
9	Brisbane Lions	26	8	6	12	28	40	−12	22	
10	Footscray JUST	26	8	3	15	29	43	−14	20	
11	St George-Budapest	26	7	6	13	27	43	−16	20	
12	Canberra City	26	6	8	12	25	41	−16	20	
13	Sydney Olympic (R)	26	7	5	14	23	30	−7	19	Relegated to the 1980 NSW State League
14	South Melbourne	26	6	3	17	26	45	−19	16	

Updated to match(es) played on unknown. Source: rsssf.com
Rules for classification: 1) points; 2) goal difference; 3) number of goals scored.
(C) Champions; (R) Relegated

== Results ==
Home \ Away	ADE	API	BRC	BRL	CAN	FOO	HEI	MAR	NKU	SOU	STG	SYC	SYO	WES
Adelaide City	—	0–1	2–4	2–0	2–1	1–2	2–0	2–4	0–0	3–0	1–1	1–1	1–0	1–0
APIA Leichhardt	1–1	—	1–1	2–1	3–0	3–2	1–0	0–0	1–3	2–1	1–0	0–3	0–2	0–1
Brisbane City	2–1	2–0	—	0–0	0–1	2–1	3–1	3–4	1–1	1–0	4–0	0–1	2–1	2–0
Brisbane Lions	0–6	2–1	1–2	—	3–0	1–0	1–3	0–4	3–0	2–0	2–3	1–2	0–0	2–3
Canberra City	0–2	0–0	0–0	1–2	—	0–3	1–2	3–1	1–5	3–2	1–1	1–3	1–3	0–0
Footscray JUST	0–2	5–1	2–0	3–1	1–2	—	2–2	0–5	2–0	0–2	1–3	1–0	0–1	0–1
Heidelberg United	1–0	2–1	0–0	0–0	0–0	2–1	—	3–2	2–4	3–0	1–0	2–2	2–1	3–1
Marconi Fairfield	4–4	2–0	3–3	0–1	1–1	0–0	0–4	—	2–1	6–0	2–1	1–0	2–0	2–1
Newcastle KB United	0–0	1–0	4–1	2–2	0–2	3–0	3–3	2–1	—	3–0	4–2	0–1	2–0	0–0
South Melbourne	1–0	1–2	4–0	3–0	1–1	1–1	0–1	1–2	1–2	—	2–0	1–2	0–3	3–4
St George-Budapest	0–2	1–2	0–1	1–1	2–4	0–2	2–2	1–1	1–1	1–0	—	0–5	2–0	2–0
Sydney City	2–3	2–3	0–1	1–1	2–1	3–0	1–3	0–4	2–0	2–0	3–1	—	3–4	3–0
Sydney Olympic	1–2	0–2	0–1	0–1	0–0	2–0	1–2	0–3	1–1	1–1	0–1	0–1	—	2–0
West Adelaide	1–2	3–1	2–1	1–0	2–0	5–0	1–0	1–2	1–1	0–1	0–1	0–2	0–0	—

Source: RSSSF
Legend: Blue = home team win; Yellow = draw; Red = away team win.

== Finals series ==
The top four teams in the league entered a play-off series. The winner of the Finals series was not considered the overall winner of the 1979 National Soccer League.

=== Round 1 ===
7 October 1979	Brisbane City	2–0	Sydney City	Brisbane
	Campbell 48', 63'	Report		Stadium: Perry Park; Attendance: 3,200; Referee: Jim Reeves

7 October 1979	Marconi Fairfield	2–1	Heidelberg United	Sydney
	Byrne 1' (pen.); Henderson 68'	Report	Cole 24'	Stadium: Marconi Oval; Attendance: 6,523; Referee: Jim Allen

=== Round 2 ===
14 October 1979	Brisbane City	2–1	Marconi Fairfield	Brisbane
	Campbell 38'; Low 72'	Report	Jankovics 58'	Stadium: Perry Park; Attendance: 5,100; Referee: Chris Bambridge

14 October 1979	Heidelberg United	1–3	Sydney City	Melbourne
	Cole 24'	Report	Stevenson 14'; Trenter 18'; Yzendoorn 68' (o.g.)	Stadium: Olympic Park No. 2 Attendance: 4,500; Referee: Don Campbell

=== Round 3 ===
19 October 1979	Heidelberg United	6–2	Brisbane City	Melbourne
	Buljevic 35'; Cole 55', 57', 67'; Bozikas 61', 71'	Report	Kelso 65'; Campbell 70'	Stadium: Olympic Park; Attendance: 500; Referee: Tony Boskovic

21 October 1979	Marconi Fairfield	0–1	Sydney City	Sydney
		Report	Barnes 75'	Stadium: Marconi Oval; Attendance: 4,782; Referee: Stewart Mellings

=== Grand Final ===
28 October 1979 First Leg	Sydney City	1–0	Brisbane City	Sydney
	M. Silva 78'	Report		Stadium: Wentworth Park; Attendance: 2,523; Referee: Ken Allen

4 November 1979 Second Leg	Brisbane City	1–1 (1–2 agg.)	Sydney City	Brisbane
	Kelso 78'	Report	Trenter 84'	Stadium: Perry Park; Attendance: 4,200; Referee: Don Campbell

== Season statistics ==
=== Top scorers ===
Rank	Player	Club	Goals
1	(Australia) Mark Jankovics	Marconi Fairfield	18
2	(Australia) Eddie Krncevic	Marconi Fairfield	13
3	(Australia) Ken Boden	Newcastle KB United	12
4	(Scotland) Kevin Low	Newcastle KB United	11
4	(Australia) Jamie Paton	Heidelberg United	11
6	(Australia) Tony Brennan	Brisbane Lions	10
6	(Australia) Gary Cole	Heidelberg United	10
6	(Australia) Peter Sharne	Marconi Fairfield	10
6	(England) Terry Smith	Sydney City	10
10	(Australia) Terry Byrne	Canberra City	9

== Individual awards ==
- Player of the Year: Ivo Prskalo (Marconi Fairfield)
- U-21 Player of the Year: Eddie Krncevic (Marconi Fairfield)
- Top Scorer(s): Mark Jankovics (Marconi Fairfield – 18 goals)
- Coach of the Year: Les Scheinflug (Marconi Fairfield)
