= 1993 NSL Cup final (October) =

- Event: 1993–94 NSL Cup
Parramatta Eagles	Sydney United
2	0
- Date: 17 October 1993
- Venue: Marconi Stadium, Sydney
- Referee: Eugene Brazzale
- Attendance: 4,156

The 1993 NSL Cup final (October) was the final match of the 1993–94 NSL Cup, the 18th season of the National Soccer League Cup. It was played at Marconi Stadium in Sydney on 17 October 1993 between Parramatta Eagles and Sydney United. Parramatta Eagles won the match 2–0 for their second NSL Cup title.

== Route to the final ==
Parramatta Eagles		Round	Sydney United	
Opposition	Score	Round	Opposition	Score
Wollongong City	4–2 (agg.)	R1	Melbourne Knights	2–2 (agr.)
Marconi Fairfield (A)	2–1	R2	Adelaide City	1–0
Brisbane Strikers (H)	2–1	SF	South Melbourne (A)	1–1 (a.e.t.) (5–4 p)
Key: (H) = Home venue; (A) = Away venue

== Match ==
=== Details ===
17 October 1993

Parramatta Eagles	2–0	Sydney United
Kupresak 42' (o.g.); Renaud 85'	Report

Marconi Stadium, Sydney
Attendance: 4,156
Referee: Eugene Brazzale

GK	(Australia) Peter Gunning
DF	(Australia) Adam Ciantar
DF	(Australia) Glenn Gwynne
DF	(Costa Rica) Gerry Gomez
DF	(Australia) John Koch
DF	(Australia) Nick Orlic
DF	(Australia) Craig Moffitt
MF	(Australia) Glen Sprod
MF	(Australia) Gabriel Mendez	(substituted off) 71'
FW	(Australia) Marshall Soper
FW	(Australia) Joe Spiteri
Substitutes:
MF	(Australia) Brendan Renaud	(substituted on) 71'
Head Coach:
(Australia) Rale Rasic

GK	(Australia) Zeljko Kalac
DF	(Australia) Robert Stanton	Yellow card
DF	(Australia) Velimir Kupresak
DF	(Australia) Tony Popovic	Yellow card
DF	(Australia) Mark Babic
DF	(Australia) Tom Milicevic
MF	(Australia) Ivan Petkovic
MF	(Australia) John Gibson
FW	(Australia) Tony Krslovic
FW	(Australia) Mario Jermen		(substituted off) 57'
FW	(Australia) Ante Milicic		(substituted off) 62'
Substitutes:
DF	(Australia) David Zdrilic		(substituted on) 57'
MF	(Australia) Ante Moric		(substituted on) 62'
Head Coach:
(Australia) Manfred Schaefer

Match rules

- 90 minutes
- 30 minutes of extra time if necessary
- Penalty shoot-out if scores still level
