= 1993–94 NSL Cup =

National Soccer League Cup

Tournament details
- Country: Australia
- Dates: 1–17 October 1993
- Teams: 14

Final positions
- Champions: Parramatta Eagles (2nd title)
- Runners-up: Sydney United

Tournament statistics
- Matches played: 20
- Attendance: 38,992 (1,950 per match)

The 1993–94 NSL Cup was the 18th edition of the NSL Cup, which was the main national association football knockout cup competition in Australia.

Heidelberg United were the defending champions, having defeated Parramatta Eagles to win their first title in the previous season's final, but they were eliminated in the first round by Morwell Falcons.

Parramatta Eagles defeated Sydney United 2–0 in the final to win their second NSL Cup title.

== Teams ==
The NSL Cup was a knockout competition with 14 teams taking part all trying to reach the Final in October 1993. The competition consisted of the 14 teams from the National Soccer League.

Round	Main date	Number of fixtures	Clubs remaining
First round	Wednesday 6 October 1993	14	14 → 7
Second round	Sunday 10 October 1993	3	7 → 4
Semi-finals	Wednesday 13 October 1993	2	4 → 2
Final	Sunday 17 October 1993	1	2 → 1

== First round ==
First leg

1 October 1993	Wollongong City	0–1	Parramatta Eagles	Wollongong
		Report	Orlic 85'	Stadium: Brandon Park; Attendance: 459; Referee: Peter Spiers

2 October 1993	Marconi Fairfield	1–1	Newcastle Breakers	Sydney
	Casserly 70'	Report	Lowe 59'	Stadium: Marconi Stadium; Attendance: 685; Referee: Neil Jones

3 October 1993	Brisbane Strikers	3–0	Sydney Olympic	Brisbane
	Wright 38'; Lees 80'; Slater 89'	Report		Stadium: Perry Park; Attendance: 1,026; Referee: Derek Crawford

3 October 1993	Heidelberg United	1–2	Morwell Falcons	Melbourne
	Gnjidic 75'	Report	Bothwell 58'; Armstrong 64'	Stadium: Olympic Village; Attendance: 659; Referee: Gerry Connolly

3 October 1993	Melbourne Knights	2–2	Sydney United	Melbourne
	Viduka 21'; De Amicis 80'	Report	Gibson 40'; Moric 47'	Stadium: Croatian Sports Centre; Attendance: 1,713; Referee: Cain Naumcevski

3 October 1993	South Melbourne	5–2	Brunswick United	Melbourne
	Awaritefe 4', 85'; Trimboli 31'; Tasios 67'; McGeachey 90+1'	Report	Smith 10'; Lane 72'	Stadium: Middle Park Soccer Stadium; Attendance: 2,272; Referee: John Fraser

3 October 1993	West Adelaide	0–1	Adelaide City	Adelaide
		Report	Mori 75'	Stadium: Hindmarsh Stadium; Attendance: 3,685; Referee: John Bidiss

Second leg

4 October 1993	Parramatta Eagles	3–2	Wollongong City	Sydney
	Falzon 22'; Ciantar 41'; Gomez 60'	Report	Lloyd 49'; White 65'	Stadium: Melita Stadium; Attendance: 590; Referee: Richard Lorenc

5 October 1993	Brunswick United	2–5	South Melbourne	Melbourne
	Lane 41'; Boutsianis 43' (o.g.)	Report	Boutsianis 33', 48', 54'; Trimboli 51'; Awaritefe 86'	Stadium: Olympic Park; Attendance: 1,176; Referee: Eugene Brazzale

6 October 1993	Adelaide City	3–3	West Adelaide	Adelaide
	Mori 40'; Hassell 55', 78'	Report	Tsekenis 7'; Brown 23'; Hooker 89' (pen.)	Stadium: Hindmarsh Stadium; Attendance: 5,674; Referee: John Papanicolas

6 October 1993	Morwell Falcons	2–1	Heidelberg United	Morwell
	Bothwell 80'; Armstrong 89'	Report	Gnijidic 43'	Stadium: Morwell Falcons Park; Attendance: 1,545; Referee: John Santa Isabel

6 October 1993	Newcastle Breakers	1–2	Marconi Fairfield	Newcastle
	Jennings 14'	Report	Bingley 61'; Angelucci 71'	Stadium: Breakers Stadium; Attendance: 1,477; Referee: Rob Davies

6 October 1993	Sydney Olympic	1–0	Brisbane Strikers	Sydney
	Tome 73'	Report		Stadium: St George Stadium; Attendance: 1,037; Referee: Con Diomis

6 October 1993	Sydney United	0–0	Melbourne Knights	Sydney
		Report		Stadium: Croatian Sports Centre; Attendance: 1,406; Referee: Gordon Dunster

== Second round ==
Brisbane Strikers had a bye for the Second round.

10 October 1993	Adelaide City	0–1	Sydney United	Adelaide
		Report		Stadium: Hindmarsh Stadium; Attendance: 3,879; Referee: John Santa Isabel

10 October 1993	Marconi Fairfield	1–2	Parramatta Eagles	Sydney
	Talay 30'	Report	Soper 5', 89'	Stadium: Marconi Stadium; Attendance: 1,846; Referee: Peter Spiers

10 October 1993	South Melbourne	4–0	Morwell Falcons	Melbourne
	Trimboli 55', 61'; Awaritefe 82'; Canosa 84' (o.g.)	Report		Stadium: Middle Park Soccer Stadium; Attendance: 1,073; Referee: Con Diomis

== Semi-finals ==
13 October 1993	Parramatta Eagles	2–1	Brisbane Strikers	Sydney
	Mendez 29' (pen.); Soper 82'	Report	Less 6'	Stadium: Marconi Stadium; Attendance: 1,245; Referee: John Fraser

13 October 1993	South Melbourne	1–1 (a.e.t.) (4–5 p)	Sydney United	Melbourne
	Goutzioulis 73'	Report	Krslovic 51'	Stadium: Olympic Park; Attendance: 2,474; Referee: Richard Lorenc

== Final ==
17 October 1993

Parramatta Eagles	2–0	Sydney United
Kupresak 42' (o.g.); Renaud 85'	Report

Marconi Stadium, Sydney
Attendance: 4,156
Referee: Eugene Brazzale
