= Maria Te Huia =

New Zealand footballer

Personal information
- Full name: Maria Te Huia

International career
Years	Team	Apps	(Gls)
1979–1980	New Zealand	4	(0)

Maria Te Huia is a former association football player who represented New Zealand at international level.

Te Huia made her Football Ferns début in a 2–2 draw with Korea Republic on 6 October 1979, and finished her international career with four caps to her credit.
