= Ray Richards (soccer) =

Australian former football midfielder (born 1946)

Personal information
- Full name: Raymond Richards
- Date of birth: 18 May 1946 (age 80)
- Place of birth: Croydon, England
- Position: Midfielder

Youth career
- Croydon

Senior career*
Years	Team	Apps	(Gls)
1963–1967	Latrobe Soccer Club		
1968	Hollandia-Inala		
1969	Sydney Croatia		
1969–1977	Marconi		
1979	APIA Leichhardt	5	(0)

International career
1967–1975	Australia	31	(5)

Managerial career
- 1974–1975: Marconi
- 1979: APIA Leichhardt
- * Club domestic league appearances and goals

Raymond Richards (born 18 May 1946) is an Australian former soccer midfielder. Born in England, he was a member of the Australian 1974 World Cup squad in West Germany and represented the country 31 times in total for 5 goals between 1967 and 1975 as well as representing Queensland and New South Wales.

== Playing career ==
=== Club career ===
Richards started his football career at the semi-professional club Croydon F.C. in London, England. At the age of 16 in 1963, he was offered a professional contract with Leyton Orient F.C., but decided to emigrate to Australia, to play with the Latrobe Soccer Club, based in Brisbane. In mid-1967, he moved to Hollandia-Inala Soccer Club, also in Brisbane, then in 1969 he moved to Sydney to play for Sydney Croatia in Division 1 (at that time, the top tier in the New South Wales competition), before moving to the Marconi Club in Division 2 for the rest of that season. Marconi was then promoted to Division 1 after winning the Division 2 premiership in 1969. Richards continued playing for the club, up to and including the first year of the National Soccer League in 1977. In 1979 Richards played five NSL matches for Sydney club APIA Leichhardt before becoming coach of the team in May.

=== International career ===
Richards played 31 times for the Australian national team and scored 5 times from 1967 to 1975.

==== 1974 World Cup ====
Richards played in Australia's three matches at the 1974 FIFA World Cup in Germany. Richards has the dubious honour of being the first Australian to be sent off in a World Cup match, getting his marching orders in Australia's third and final group game against Chile in 1974. He actually received two yellow cards but no red card. It wasn't until the reserve official, Clive Thomas, informed the linesman of the mistake four minutes after the second yellow card that the referee, Jafar Namdar, realised his mistake and ordered him off the field.

== Coaching career ==
Between 1974 and 1975, Richards acted as a player/coach at Marconi. From May 1979 until the end of the year he coached APIA after the demise of Jim Adam.

== Dogs ==
Richards later became enthusiastic about dog racing and eventually ran a few greyhounds himself on the racetracks of Australia. He had great success with Tenthill Doll, which he bought for 20,000 dollars, of which he sold a half-share to a friend. In 56 races the bitch, who was called Sally at home, won 31 times, came second 10 times and third seven times, winning 382,660 dollars in the process. Converted into US dollars, she was the highest earning dog in the world at the time, just behind ‘Mo Kick’ from the USA. She was also the first greyhound to win three group one events in succession: the 1996 Golden Easter Egg, Perth Cup and Australian Cup finals. In 1999, she was inducted into the Australian Greyhound Racing Association Hall of Fame.

== Honours ==
- Queensland
  - Winner of the league (with Latrobe Soccer Club): 1964, 1966, 1967
  - Winner of the Grand Final (with Latrobe Soccer Club): 1965, 1966
- New South Wales
  - Winner of the Grand Final (with Marconi): 1972, 1973
- Richards has been designated as Socceroo #199 and has been inducted as a member of the Football Federation Australia Football Hall of Fame.
