= Ernie Campbell =

Australian soccer player

Personal information
- Full name: William Ernest Campbell
- Date of birth: 20 October 1949 (age 77)
- Place of birth: Sydney, Australia
- Position: Forward

Youth career
- Canterbury-Marrickville
- 1965: Chelsea

Senior career*
Years	Team	Apps	(Gls)
1967–1970	APIA	?	(?)
1971–1977	Marconi Stallions	45	(10)
1978–1979	Sydney City	22	(2)
1980–1982	St George	18+	(3+)

International career
1971–1975	Australia	24	(3)
- * Club domestic league appearances and goals

William Ernest "Ernie" Campbell (born 20 October 1949) is a former soccer forward. He was a member of the Australian 1974 World Cup squad in West Germany and represented Australia 24 times between 1971 and 1975 and scored three goals.

== Club career ==
Born in Sydney, Australia, Campbell started playing football as a junior in Sydney and was spotted by scouts from English club Chelsea in 1965 in an under 16 junior curtain raiser and accepted a three-season apprenticeship from Chelsea F.C. He returned to Australia after seven months.

He later returned to Sydney to join APIA and then Marconi Stallions, playing in the NSL with Marconi Stallions, Sydney City and St George.

== International career ==
He won NSW honours in 1974 and made his international debut against Israel in November 1971 in Melbourne.
