= Eddie Krncevic =

Australian footballer (born 1960)

Eddie Krncevic OAM
Personal information
- Full name: Eduvard Krncevic
- Date of birth: 14 August 1960 (age 66)
- Place of birth: Geelong, Australia
- Height: 1.88 m (6 ft 2 in)
- Position: Forward

Senior career*
Years	Team	Apps	(Gls)
1976–1978	Essendon Croatia		
1979–1981	Marconi	81	(31)
1981–1984	Dinamo Zagreb	40	(7)
1984	MSV Duisburg	18	(3)
1985	Sydney Croatia	3	(3)
1985–1986	Cercle Brugge	45	(15)
1986–1989	Anderlecht	84	(52)
1988	→ Marconi (loan)	1	(0)
1989–1990	Mulhouse	29	(7)
1990–1992	FC Liège	38	(6)
1992–1995	Eendracht Aalst	51	(12)
1995–1996	Charleroi	17	(4)
1996–1997	Gippsland Falcons	19	(5)

International career
1979	Australia U20		
1979–1989	Australia	35	(17)

Managerial career
- 1997–1999: Carlton SC
- 1999–2001: Marconi
- 2001–2002: South Melbourne
- 2003: Fawkner Blues
- 2004–2005: Maribyrnong Greens
- 2007: North Geelong Warriors
- 2010–2011: South Melbourne
- * Club domestic league appearances and goals

Eduvard "Eddie" Krncevic OAM (/ˈkrɛntʃəvɪk/ KRENCH-ə-vik; Croatian: Edi Krnčević; born 14 August 1960) is an Australian retired football player and manager who played as a forward.

== Club career ==
After playing his first four years of professional football in Australia, Krncevic moved to the land of his parents in 1981, joining Croatian side NK Dinamo Zagreb, where he had relative individual success, besides helping the side win one league and one cup.

Krnčević then played four months in the German second division with MSV Duisburg, after which he embarked on his most successful spell, ten and a half years in Belgium – with one season in France with FC Mulhouse in between – where he represented Cercle Brugge KSV, Royal Charleroi, R.S.C. Anderlecht, R.F.C. de Liège and K.S.C. Eendracht Aalst; he became the first Australian-born player to be crowned top scorer in a European league.

Even though silverware was hard to come even at Anderlecht, in 1988–89 Krnčević was crowned the league's top scorer at 23 goals, and helped the capital side to the domestic cup – in that competition, he scored in all three finals he won, the first being with Cercle.

In 1996, aged 36, Krncevic returned to Australia and played one final season with the Gippsland Falcons. In the late 1990s and early 2000s, he had a coaching career, with all the clubs hailing from his homeland, in the National Soccer League. Internationally, he opted to represent his birth country, scoring every other match in 35 caps, and helping the country to win the 1980 OFC Nations Cup.

== International career ==
Krncevic was captain of the Australia team that won the 1980 Oceania Cup, of which only one match, an 11–2 defeat of Papua New Guinea, counted as a full international match.

Krncevic was an Australian schoolboys representative, earning selection in 1977.

== Honours ==
Essendon Croatia

- Victorian Champions: 1978
- Victorian State League Cup: 1978
- Ampol Cup: 1977, 1978
- Armstrong Cup: 1977

Marconi

- National Soccer League: 1979
- NSL Cup: 1980

Dinamo Zagreb

- Yugoslav League: 1981–82
- Yugoslav Cup: 1982–83

Cercle Brugge

- Belgian Cup: 1984–85; runner-up 1985–86

Anderlecht

- Belgian League: 1986–87
- Belgian Cup: 1987–88, 1988–89
- Belgian Super Cup: 1987

Australia

- OFC Nations Cup: 1980

Individual

- Medal of the Order of Australia (OAM) – 2021
- FFA Hall of Champions Inductee – 2000
- Belgian League: Top scorer 1988–89
- NSL: Papasavas Medal (U-21) 1979
