= Allan Maher =

Australian soccer player

Personal information
- Full name: Allan Maher
- Date of birth: 21 July 1950 (age 76)
- Position: Goalkeeper

Youth career
- North Rocks

Senior career*
Years	Team	Apps	(Gls)
1969–1973	Sutherland	?	(?)
1974	Sutherland	17	(0)
1975–1983	Club Marconi	?	(?)

International career
1975–1981	Australia	22	(0)
- * Club domestic league appearances and goals

Allan Maher (born 21 July 1950) is an Australian former soccer goalkeeper, who was part of Australia's squad for the 1974 FIFA World Cup.

== Playing career ==
An Irish-Australian Roman Catholic, at club level, he was a part of the successful Marconi sides of the early National Soccer League years, where he was a member of their 1979 championship side.

While Maher was a member of Australia's 1974 FIFA World Cup squad, he didn't make his full international debut until 1975. He represented Australia in 22 A internationals between 1975 and 1981.
