= Tony Henderson =

Association football player (born 1954)

Personal information
- Full name: Anthony Joseph Henderson
- Date of birth: 14 January 1954 (age 72)
- Place of birth: Newcastle upon Tyne, England
- Position: Defender

Youth career
- Blackpool

Senior career*
Years	Team	Apps	(Gls)
1970–1974	Rotherham United	6	(0)
1975	Durban United		
1975–1976	East London United		
1977–1978	Canberra City	51	(5)
1979–1988	Marconi	243	(16)
1989	Avala		
1989–1990	Blacktown City	4	(0)

International career
1979–1983	Australia	27	(2)
1984	Australia B	7	(0)

Managerial career
- 1989–1991: Blacktown City
- 2000–2002: AC United
- * Club domestic league appearances and goals

Anthony Joseph Henderson (born 14 January 1954) is a former association footballer who played as a defender. Born in England, he captained Australia five times in the early 1980s.

== Club career ==
Henderson was born in Newcastle upon Tyne, England. He played youth football at Blackpool before signing for Rotherham United where he made six league appearances between 1970 and 1974.

In 1975 moved to South Africa where he turned out for Durban United before moving during the 1975 season to East London United. He played at East London until the end of the 1976 season.

In 1977, he joined Canberra City for the first year of the Australian National Soccer League. In two seasons with City he played 51 matches, scoring five goals.

Before the 1979 NSL season Henderson transferred to Marconi Stallions. In ten seasons with the West Sydney team he played 243 matches, scoring 16 goals.

== International career ==
Henderson played 27 full international matches for Australia between 1979 and 1983, including five matches as captain. He also played 23 B-Internationals for Australia.
