= Ivo Prskalo =

Australian footballer

Personal information
- Full name: Ivo Prskalo
- Date of birth: 2 January 1948
- Place of birth: Čapljina, Yugoslavia
- Date of death: 2 September 2010 (aged 62)
- Place of death: Sydney, Australia
- Position: Defender

Senior career*
Years	Team	Apps	(Gls)
1967–1976	Velež Mostar	168	(0)
1977–1982	Marconi Fairfield	141	(0)

International career^{‡}
1979–1980	Australia	14	(1)
- * Club domestic league appearances and goals as of 01:00, 4 September 2010 (UTC) ‡ National team caps and goals as of 01:00, 4 September 2010 (UTC)

Ivo Prskalo (2 January 1948 – 2 September 2010) was a professional soccer player who played for Marconi Fairfield in the National Soccer League. Born in Yugoslavia, he represented Australia at international level.

== Club career ==
Prskalo began his senior career with Velež Mostar in the Yugoslav First League. He made 168 appearances in nine seasons with the club, establishing himself as a key defender in the squad managed by Sulejman Rebac. He emigrated to Australia for the inaugural season of the National Soccer League in 1977, joining Marconi Fairfield where he featured in every match under former Socceroos head coach Rale Rasic.

The pinnacle of his club career came in 1979, where at the age of 31, he claimed the honour of NSL Player of the Year in Marconi's championship year under Les Scheinflug. He retired from club football in 1982 at the age of 34, having amassed 141 appearances with the Sydney-based club.

== International career ==
Prskalo made his international debut for Australia at the Sydney Sports Ground in 1979, where Australia were defeated by a touring Partizan Belgrade. His first official 'A' international came later that year against Taiwan in a friendly played in Taipei. His only international goal was a ninth-minute penalty against Czechoslovakia the following year at Olympic Park in Melbourne. In all, he made 27 appearances for his adopted country, 14 of which were 'A' internationals.

== Honours ==
With Velež Mostar:

- Yugoslav First League: 1972–73

With Marconi Fairfield:

- NSL Championship: 1979; 1977 (Runners-Up)
- NSL Cup: 1980; 1977 (Runners-Up)

Personal honours:

- NSL Player of the Year: 1979 with Marconi Fairfield
