= Mark Jankovics =

Australian soccer player

Personal information
- Date of birth: 5 April 1956 (age 70)
- Place of birth: Australia
- Position: Striker

Senior career*
Years	Team	Apps	(Gls)
–1977	Saints	24+	(4+)
1978–1986	Marconi Stallions	202	(96)

International career
1976–1983	Australia	15	(0)
- * Club domestic league appearances and goals

Mark Jankovics (born 5 April 1956) is an Australian former soccer player who played as a striker.

== Career ==
Jankovics started his career with Australian top flight side Saints. Before the 1978 season, he signed for Marconi Stallions in the Australian top flight, helping them win their first league title and the 1980 NSL Cup.
