= Peter Sharne =

Australian soccer player

Personal information
- Full name: Peter Sharne
- Date of birth: 22 March 1956 (age 70)
- Place of birth: Sydney, Australia
- Position: Winger

Youth career
- Marconi
- Liverpool City
- Southern Districts

Senior career*
Years	Team	Apps	(Gls)
1977–1982	Marconi	142	(56)
1981-1982	→ Eastern AA (loan)	26	(13)
1982-1983	Eastern AA	19	(5)
1983	APIA Leichhardt	11	(1)
1984–1988	Marconi	35	(5)

International career^{‡}
1977–1981	Australia	23	(8)
- * Club domestic league appearances and goals as of 10 July 2010 ‡ National team caps and goals as of 10 July 2010

Peter Sharne (born 22 March 1956 in Sydney) is an Australian former footballer who played as a winger. Sharne attended Patrician Brothers' College, Fairfield.

He spent his entire career with NSL club Marconi. He started in 1977 until 1988. He made a total of 186 national league appearances. He also played on loan in Hong Kong for Eastern AA in the early 1980s for about two seasons. He was a star in the Hong Kong league where he was selected to be on the League Best XI.

He was a member of Australian national team during the 1978 World Cup qualifying campaign. He made his debut as a substitute against Iran in August 1977 in Melbourne. He also played in the 1982 World Cup campaign. He earned 40 caps for Australia with 23 of them A internationals. He scored 10 goals (eight A-international goals). He won the Award of Distinction from Australian Football Hall of Fame.
