= Gary Byrne (soccer) =

Australian former soccer player

Personal information
- Date of birth: 19 July 1954 (age 72)
- Place of birth: Hemel Hempstead, UK
- Position: Midfielder

Youth career
- Camden Tigers

Senior career*
Years	Team	Apps	(Gls)
1971–1981	Marconi Stallions	?	(?)
1973	Sutherland Sharks	?	(?)
1982–1983	Canberra City	?	(?)
1984–1986	Blacktown City	?	(?)

International career
1975–1983	Australia	36	(1)
- * Club domestic league appearances and goals

Gary Byrne (born 19 July 1954) is an Australian former soccer player who played for Australia during the late 1970s and early 1980s.

== Playing career ==
A significant member of Australia's 1978 and 1982 World Cup campaigns and a vital part of Marconi Stallions successful early NSL years, where he won a national championship medal in 1979.

== Honours ==
Byrne was made a member of the Football Federation Australia Football Hall of Fame in 2009.
