= Marconi Stadium =

Soccer stadium in Sydney, Australia

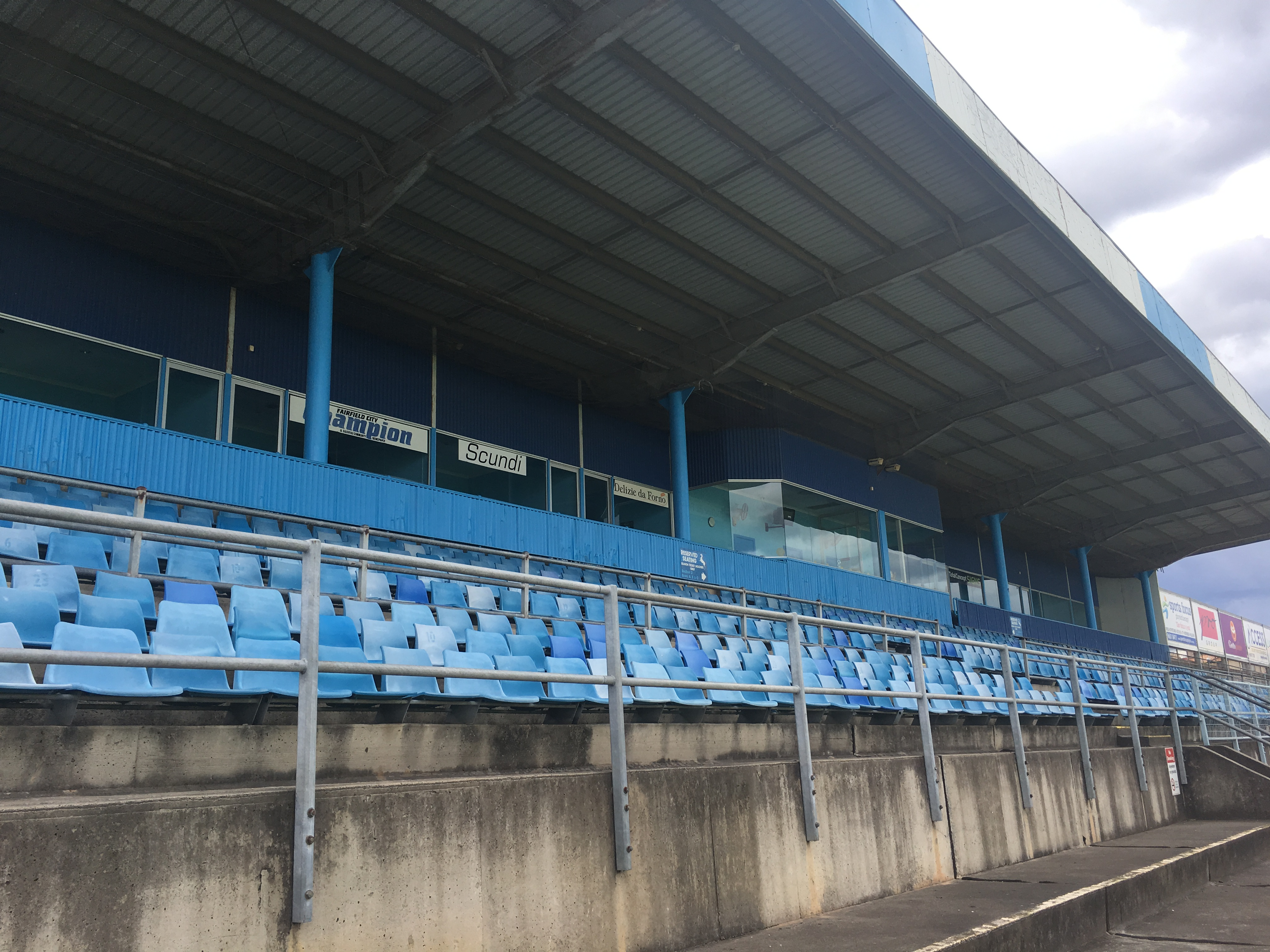
- The western stand at Marconi Stadium
- Interactive map of Marconi Stadium
- Location: Marconi Rd, Bossley Park
- Coordinates: 33°51′49″S 150°52′49″E
- Capacity: 9,000
- Surface: Grass
- Field size: 120m x 88m

Construction
- Opened: 1972

Tenants
- Marconi Stallions, Western Sydney Wanderers

Marconi Stadium is a soccer stadium in Sydney, Australia. It is the home ground for Marconi Stallions, as well as regularly hosting matches for the Western Sydney Wanderers FC including their National Youth League and W-League teams.

== Marconi Stallions ==
Although a soccer pitch had existed on the site since the start of the soccer club in the 1960s, Marconi Stadium itself was built in 1972 with a capacity of 11,500 and used for Marconi Stallions matches within the NSW State League soccer pyramid. In 1977 the team joined the newly formed NSL and played in that competition until it ended in 2004 and the team re-joined the NSW State system. The stadium currently hosts Marconi games in the NSW Premier League. Marconi Stadium hosted the 2006 NSW Premier League final between Sydney United and Blacktown City.

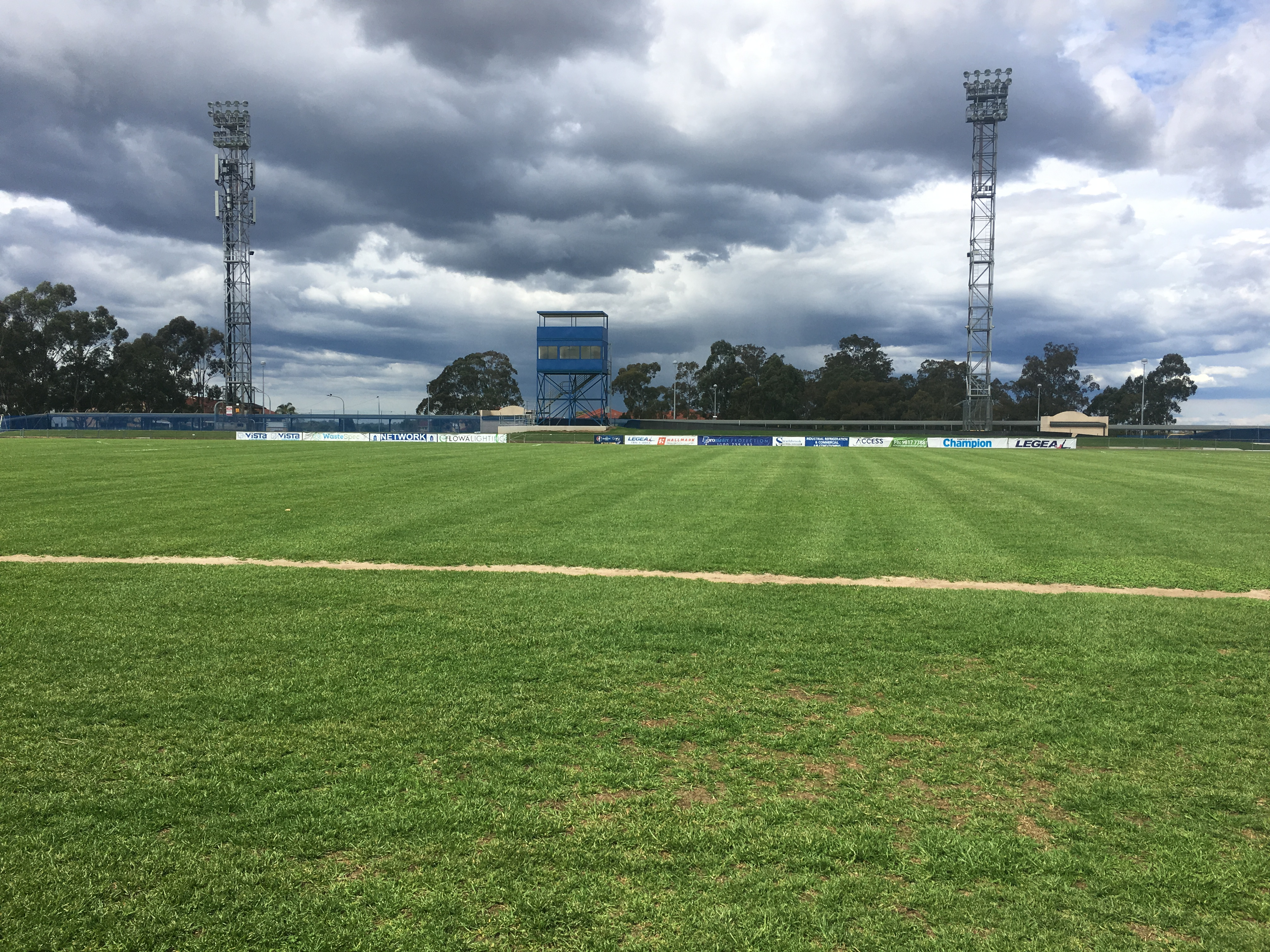
Eastern hill at Marconi Stadium, including the broadcast tower.

During the peak of the club success in the late 1980s to early 1990s the stadium earned the nickname "The Palace", being set alongside Club Marconi, the large licensed venue which generated significant financial support for the soccer club which helped them acquire a large number of talented players & staff.

In November 2006, Berti Mariani ran for election to the board, on a platform of Marconi Stallions making a bid to join the A-League, and rebuilding Marconi Stadium into suitable venue.

After the end of the NSL and the failure of Marconi to enter the new national competition the A-League, the full capacity of the stadium was no longer needed. The Eastern stand in particular fell into disuse and was eventually declared unsafe due to a shifting foundation. By 2018 the seating had been removed, the foundation repaired, a raised structure built containing a box for commentary or camera operators, with the rest of the former grandstand area being converted into a basic grassy hill.

== International usage ==
The venue was used as a training camp for Australia as part of their preparation for their 2010 FIFA World Cup qualification campaign. In 2007, the stadium hosted a match in which Chelsea legend Gianfranco Zola made a guest appearance in a game between APIA Leichhardt Tigers and the Marconi Stallions.

The ground record crowd for Marconi Stadium was set in 1993 when 14,220 fans attended to see the Australian under-20s take on the Brazil under-20s side in a warm up game for the 1993 FIFA World Youth Championship held in Australia later that year. The stadium also hosts play-offs & grand finals for various youth & amateur competitions including the Churches Football Association of Sydney, as well as one-off charity & special events.

In 2023 the venue was the training facility for the Colombian 2023 FIFA Women's World Cup squad.

== Western Sydney Wanderers ==
With the introduction of the Western Sydney Wanderers FC into the A-League, Club Marconi and the Wanderers began an association that has seen matches for the Western Sydney Wanderers FC Women's, Youth and NPL sides played at Marconi Stadium. The Marconi social club has also hosted Wanderers supporters viewing important away games & hosted club supporter forums. On Saturday 27 September 2014, a W-League Sydney Derby match between the Western Sydney Wanderers and Sydney FC resulted in a record stand alone W-League regular season crowd of 3,084 to watch Sydney FC win the match 2–0.

In the 2018 season of the FFA Cup the Western Sydney Wanderers were drawn to play an away game against Bonnyrigg White Eagles. Due to a poor surface and a general lack of facilities to host the game at the Bonnyrigg stadium, the fixture was moved to Marconi Stadium and played 29 August 2018, the Wanderers winning 2–1 with a crowd of 5,137. From 2019 onward the opening of the Wanderers Football Park boutique stadium at the Blacktown International Sportspark has seen the club cut back the number of games played at Marconi Stadium.

The Wanderers were drawn to host Adelaide United FC in the Round of 16 of the 2023 Australia Cup with the match taking place on 29 August 2023, the Wanderers won the game 5–1 with Marcus Antonsson and Brandon Borrello both scoring twice and Milos Ninkovic scoring his first goal for the Wanderers. The crowd was reported at 2,490. In August 2026 the Wanderers faced Melbourne Victory in a Round of 16 match, with the Wanderers losing in a penalty shootout after a 1-1 draw after extra time.

== Rugby League ==
In 1996, the stadium hosted a Rugby league sevens match between Italy & Lebanon. In October 2009 the stadium hosted the rugby league Mediterranean Shield, involving Australian local players split into 4 'national' teams based on Portuguese, Maltese, Italian and Greek heritage, with Greece winning the final 34–14 against Italy.
