= 1980 Heidelberg United FC season =

Heidelberg United
1980 season
- Head Coach: Jimmy Rooney; Pat Bannon; Len McKendry
- Stadium: Olympic Park; Olympic Park No. 2
- National Soccer League: 2nd
- NSL Cup: Runners-up
- Top goalscorer: League: Gary Cole (21); All: Gary Cole (22)
- Highest home attendance: 15,000 vs. South Melbourne (6 July 1980); National Soccer League
- Lowest home attendance: 2,500 vs. Canberra City (9 August 1980); National Soccer League
- Average home league attendance: 4,623
- Biggest win: 5–0 vs. APIA Leichhardt (A) (6 April 1980); National Soccer League
- Biggest defeat: 0–7 vs. Brisbane City (A) (27 July 1980); National Soccer League
Home colours

The 1980 season was the fourth in the National Soccer League for Heidelberg United. In addition to the domestic league, they also participated in the NSL Cup. Heidelberg United finished 2nd in their National Soccer League season and were eliminated in the Final of the NSL Cup.

== Players ==
Note: Flags indicate national team as defined under FIFA eligibility rules; some limited exceptions apply. Players may hold more than one non-FIFA nationality.

No.	Pos.	Nation	Player
1	GK	AUS	Jeff Olver
2	DF	SCO	Arthur McMillan
3	DF	AUS	Jim Tansey
4	DF	AUS	John Yzendoorn
5	DF	SCO	Pat Bannon
6	MF	AUS	Jimmy Rooney (captain)
7	MF	AUS	Theo Selemidis
8	MF	AUS	Jim Campbell

No.	Pos.	Nation	Player
9	FW	AUS	Jamie Paton
10	DF	AUS	Charlie Yankos
11	MF	AUS	Andy Bozikas
14	DF	SCO	Bob Provan
15	MF	AUS	Ken Taylor
16	FW	AUS	Gary Cole
17	MF	ENG	Jim Williams
23	GK	AUS	Yakka Banovic

== Competitions ==
=== Overall record ===
Competition	First match	Last match	Starting round	Final position	Record							
Competition	First match	Last match	Starting round	Final position	Pld	W	D	L	GF	GA	GD	Win %
National Soccer League	9 March 1980	28 September 1980	Matchday 1	2nd	26	15	6	5	55	33	+22	57.69
NSL Cup	25 April 1980	15 October 1980	First round	Runners-up	6	3	2	1	6	4	+2	50.00
Total					32	18	8	6	61	37	+24	56.25

Source: Competitions

=== National Soccer League ===
==== League table ====
Pos	Team	Pld	W	D	L	GF	GA	GD	Pts	Qualification or relegation
1	Sydney City (C)	26	16	5	5	51	26	+25	37	Qualification to Finals series (Note: The Finals series was not considered the championship for the 1980 National Soccer League.)
2	Heidelberg United	26	15	6	5	55	33	+22	36	Qualification to Finals series
3	South Melbourne	26	15	5	6	42	21	+21	35	Qualification to Finals series
4	Marconi Fairfield	26	14	6	6	53	32	+21	34	Qualification to Finals series
5	Adelaide City	26	13	4	9	40	27	+13	30	
6	Newcastle KB United	26	12	6	8	32	31	+1	30	
7	Brisbane Lions	26	7	11	8	28	32	−4	25	
8	APIA Leichhardt	26	8	7	11	27	35	−8	23	
9	Footscray JUST	26	7	9	10	32	41	−9	23	
10	Canberra City	26	7	7	12	34	33	+1	21	
11	Blacktown City	26	9	3	14	34	55	−21	21	
12	Brisbane City	26	4	10	12	29	36	−7	18	
13	West Adelaide	26	7	3	16	24	46	−22	17	
14	St George-Budapest (R)	26	5	4	17	32	65	−33	14	Relegated to the 1981 NSW State League

Updated to match(es) played on unknown. Source: rsssf.com
Rules for classification: 1) points; 2) goal difference; 3) number of goals scored.
(C) Champions; (R) Relegated

==== Results summary ====
Overall								Home						Away					
Pld	W	D	L	GF	GA	GD	Pts	W	D	L	GF	GA	GD	W	D	L	GF	GA	GD
26	15	6	5	55	33	+22	51	9	3	1	35	14	+21	6	3	4	20	19	+1

Source: worldfootball.net

==== Results by round ====
Round	1	2	3	4	5	6	7	8	9	10	11	12	14	16	15	17	18	19	20	13	21	22	23	24	25	26
Ground	A	H	A	H	A	H	A	H	A	H	A	H	A	A	H	H	H	A	H	A	A	H	A	H	A	H
Result	D	W	D	W	W	W	W	W	L	W	D	W	L	W	L	D	W	L	W	W	W	D	W	D	L	W
Position	9	2	2	2	2	1	1	1	1	1	1	1	1	1	1	1	1	2	2	1	1	2	2	2	2	2
Points	1	3	4	6	8	10	12	14	14	16	17	19	19	21	21	22	24	24	26	28	30	31	33	34	34	36

Source: worldfootball.net
A = Away; H = Home; W = Win; D = Draw; L = Loss

==== Matches ====
Win Draw Loss

9 March 1980 1	South Melbourne	0–0	Heidelberg United	Melbourne
		Report		Stadium: Middle Park Soccer Stadium; Attendance: 8,565; Referee: Stewart Mellings

16 March 1980 2	Heidelberg United	4–2	West Adelaide	Melbourne
	Cole 4', 9', 11'; Paton 35'	Report	Atsalas 57'; Kosmina 75'	Stadium: Olympic Park; Attendance: 4,185; Referee: Chris Bambridge

23 March 1980 3	Sydney City	1–1	Heidelberg United	Sydney
15:00 AEST	Spanos 22'	Report	Yzendoorn 69'	Stadium: Sydney Sports Ground; Attendance: 1,827; Referee: Henry Witschge

30 March 1980 4	Heidelberg United	5–1	Blacktown City	Melbourne
	Rooney 15'; Selemidis 23'; Paton 56'; Cole 83'; Campbell 85'	Report	Pollard 25'	Stadium: Olympic Park No. 2 Attendance: 4,085; Referee: Jack Johnston

6 April 1980 5	APIA Leichhardt	0–5	Heidelberg United	Sydney
		Report	Cole 17', 44', 60'; Paton 35', 80'	Stadium: Lambert Park; Attendance: 4,021; Referee: Jim Reeves

13 April 1980 6	Heidelberg United	3–1	Brisbane City	Melbourne
	Cole 5', 44', 75'	Report	Kelso 42'	Stadium: Olympic Park; Attendance: 3,200; Referee: Tony Beazleigh

20 April 1980 7	Canberra City	0–1	Heidelberg United	Canberra
15:00 AEST		Report	Campbell 28'	Stadium: Bruce Stadium; Attendance: 6,135; Referee: Peter Rampley

27 April 1980 8	Heidelberg United	3–2	Footscray JUST	Melbourne
15:00 AEST	Paton 12'; Cole 52', 64'	Report	Lujic 47'; Picioane 84'	Stadium: Olympic Park; Attendance: 4,800; Referee: Ken Allen

4 May 1980 9	Adelaide City	1–0	Heidelberg United	Adelaide
	Melta 16'	Report		Stadium: Olympic Sports Field; Attendance: 5,315; Referee: Don Campbell

11 May 1980 10	Heidelberg United	4–2	St George-Budapest	Melbourne
	Campbell 24'; Cole 62', 72'; Bozikas 71'	Report	Duarte 15', 84'	Stadium: Olympic Park; Attendance: 3,200; Referee: Chris Bambridge

14 May 1980 11	Marconi Fairfield	1–1	Heidelberg United	Sydney
19:30 AEST	Jankovics 4'	Report	Cole 44'	Stadium: Marconi Oval; Attendance: 7,345; Referee: Ken Allen

25 May 1980 12	Heidelberg United	4–0	Newcastle KB United	Melbourne
	Campbell 30'; Bozikas 44'; Cole 73', 75'	Report		Stadium: Olympic Park; Attendance: 3,727; Referee: Stewart Mellings

8 June 1980 14	West Adelaide	1–0	Heidelberg United	Adelaide
	Manecas 73'	Report		Stadium: Hindmarsh Stadium; Attendance: 3,654; Referee: Tony Boskovic

22 June 1980 16	Blacktown City	1–2	Heidelberg United	Sydney
15:00 AEST	Wilkinson 61'	Report	Bozikas 1'; Cole 53' (pen.)	Stadium: Gabbie Stadium; Attendance: 3,598; Referee: Doug Rennie

6 July 1980 15	Heidelberg United	1–2	South Melbourne	Melbourne
	Paton 2'	Report	Buljevic 51', 80'	Stadium: Olympic Park; Attendance: 15,000; Referee: Graham Neal

12 July 1980 17	Heidelberg United	0–0	Sydney City	Melbourne
20:00 AEST		Report		Stadium: Olympic Park; Attendance: 4,307; Referee: Dave Nugent

20 July 1980 18	Heidelberg United	5–1	APIA Leichhardt	Melbourne
	Cole 2'; Rooney 16', 53'; Paton 74', 77'	Report	O'Connor 90'	Stadium: Olympic Park; Attendance: 2,700; Referee: Don Campbell

27 July 1980 19	Brisbane City	7–0	Heidelberg United	Brisbane
	Kelso 19', 50', 84'; Low 42'; Palinkas 70'; Ratcliffe 80'; Brusasco 83'	Report		Stadium: Perry Park; Attendance: 2,547; Referee: Peter Rampley

9 August 1980 20	Heidelberg United	2–0	Canberra City	Melbourne
	Campbell 24'; Paton 70'	Report		Stadium: Olympic Park; Attendance: 2,500; Referee: Tony Beazleigh

13 August 1980 13	Brisbane Lions	1–2	Heidelberg United	Brisbane
	Millman 86'	Report	Cole 25'; Paton 34'	Stadium: Lions Stadium; Attendance: 1,500; Referee: Bob Mee

17 August 1980 21	Footscray JUST	0–2	Heidelberg United	Melbourne
		Report	Paton 32'; Bozikas 56'	Stadium: Western Oval; Attendance: 6,734; Referee: Chris Bambridge

30 August 1980 22	Heidelberg United	0–0	Adelaide City	Melbourne
		Report		Stadium: Olympic Park; Attendance: 3,043; Referee: Tony Boskovic

7 September 1980 23	St George-Budapest	3–5	Heidelberg United	Sydney
15:00 AEST	Cotton 26' (pen.); Katholos 45'; Barton 79'	Report	Yzendoorn 7', 48'; Paton 52', 65'; Cole 71'	Stadium: St George Stadium; Attendance: 2,231; Referee: Henry Witschge

14 September 1980 24	Heidelberg United	3–3	Marconi Fairfield	Melbourne
	Bozikas 18'; Yzendoorn 35'; Paton 45'	Report	Krncevic 8'; Jankovics 23', 30'	Stadium: Olympic Park; Attendance: 5,553; Referee: Don Campbell

20 September 1980 25	Newcastle KB United	3–1	Heidelberg United	Newcastle
	Drinkwater 55' (pen.); Heys 81', 83'	Report	Paton 51'	Stadium: Newcastle International Sports Centre; Attendance: 5,242; Referee: Richard Lorenc

28 September 1980 26	Heidelberg United	1–0	Brisbane Lions	Melbourne
	Campbell 15'	Report		Stadium: Olympic Park No. 2 Attendance: 3,804; Referee: Chris Bambridge

==== Finals series ====
The Finals series was not considered the championship for the 1980 National Soccer League.

11 October 1980 Qualifying semi-final	Sydney City	2–0	Heidelberg United	Sydney
	Trenter 35'; Boden 39' (pen.)	Report		Stadium: Sydney Sports Ground; Attendance: 3,457; Referee: Tony Boskovic

18 October 1980 Preliminary Final	Heidelberg United	4–1	South Melbourne	Melbourne
	Paton 5', 85'; Bozikas 26'; Cole 67' (pen.)	Report	Buljevic 9'	Stadium: Olympic Park; Attendance: 7,700; Referee: Tim Davies

26 October 1980 Grand Final	Sydney City	0–4	Heidelberg United	Canberra
		Report	Cole 32', 43' (pen.), 77'; Paton 87'	Stadium: Bruce Stadium; Attendance: 11,126; Referee: Don Campbell

=== NSL Cup ===
Win Draw Loss

25 April 1980 First round	Heidelberg United	2–0	(Victoria (state)) Essendon Croatia	Melbourne
	Bannon ?'; Selemidis ?'	Report		Stadium: Olympic Park; Attendance: 4,800; Referee: Stewart Mellings

23 July 1980 Second round	Heidelberg United	2–1	South Melbourne	Melbourne
	Yzendoorn 55'; Cole 76'	Report	Rogers 30'	Stadium: Olympic Park; Attendance: 7,232; Referee: Henry Witschge

3 August 1980 Quarter-finals	Canberra City	0–2	Heidelberg United	Canberra
14:30 AEST		Report	Selemidis 45'; Paton 89'	Stadium: Bruce Stadium; Attendance: 2,050; Referee: Richard Lorenc

10 September 1980 Semi-finals	Heidelberg United	0–0 (a.e.t.) (3–1 p)	Adelaide City	Melbourne
		Report		Stadium: Olympic Park; Attendance: 3,000; Referee: Tim Davies

4 October 1980 Final 1st Leg	Heidelberg United	0–0	Marconi Fairfield	Melbourne
		Report		Stadium: Olympic Park; Attendance: 6,388; Referee: Jack Johnston

15 October 1980 Final 2nd Leg	Marconi Fairfield	3–0	Heidelberg United	Sydney
	Byrne 17' (pen.); Krncevic 64'; Sharne 87'	Report		Stadium: Marconi Stadium; Attendance: 5,179; Referee: Jack Johnston

== Statistics ==
=== Appearances and goals ===
Includes all competitions. Players with no appearances not included in the list.

No.	Pos.	Nat.	Player	National Soccer League		NSL Cup		Total	
No.	Pos.	Nat.	Player	Apps	Goals	Apps	Goals	Apps	Goals
1	GK	(Australia)	Jeff Olver	8	0	4	0	12	0
2	DF	(Scotland)	Arthur McMillan	26	0	6	0	32	0
3	DF	(Australia)	Jim Tansey	26	0	6	0	32	0
4	DF	(Australia)	John Yzendoorn	24	4	5	1	29	5
5	DF	(Scotland)	Pat Bannon	26	0	6	1	32	1
6	MF	(Australia)	Jimmy Rooney	22+1	3	5	0	28	3
7	MF	(Australia)	Theo Selemidis	26	1	6	2	32	3
8	MF	(Australia)	Jim Campbell	26	6	5	0	31	6
9	FW	(Australia)	Jamie Paton	26	15	6	1	32	16
10	DF	(Australia)	Charlie Yankos	0+1	0	0	0	1	0
11	MF	(Australia)	Andy Bozikas	24+1	5	5	0	30	5
14	DF	(Scotland)	Bob Provan	2+2	0	2	0	6	0
15	MF	(Australia)	Ken Taylor	4+6	0	1+2	0	13	0
16	FW	(Australia)	Gary Cole	26	21	6	1	32	22
17	MF	(England)	Jim Williams	2+6	0	1+3	0	12	0
23	GK	(Australia)	Yakka Banovic	18	0	2	0	20	0

=== Disciplinary record ===
Includes all competitions. The list is sorted by squad number when total cards are equal. Players with no cards not included in the list.

Rank	No.	Pos.	Nat.	Player	National Soccer League			NSL Cup			Total		
Rank	No.	Pos.	Nat.	Player	Yellow card	Second yellow card	Red card	Yellow card	Second yellow card	Red card	Yellow card	Second yellow card	Red card
1	4	DF	(Australia)	John Yzendoorn	2	0	0	1	0	0	3	0	0
1	5	DF	(Scotland)	Pat Bannon	1	0	0	2	0	0	3	0	0
1	7	MF	(Australia)	Theo Selemidis	2	0	0	1	0	0	3	0	0
4	11	MF	(Australia)	Andy Bozikas	2	0	0	0	0	0	2	0	0
4	14	DF	(Scotland)	Bob Provan	1	0	0	1	0	0	2	0	0
4	16	FW	(Australia)	Gary Cole	2	0	0	0	0	0	2	0	0
7	2	DF	(Scotland)	Arthur McMillan	1	0	0	0	0	0	1	0	0
7	6	MF	(Australia)	Jimmy Rooney	1	0	0	0	0	0	1	0	0
7	8	MF	(Australia)	Jim Campbell	1	0	0	0	0	0	1	0	0
7	9	FW	(Australia)	Jamie Paton	1	0	0	0	0	0	1	0	0
Total					13	0	0	6	0	0	19	0	0

=== Clean sheets ===
Includes all competitions. The list is sorted by squad number when total clean sheets are equal. Numbers in parentheses represent games where both goalkeepers participated and both kept a clean sheet; the number in parentheses is awarded to the goalkeeper who was substituted on, whilst a full clean sheet is awarded to the goalkeeper who was on the field at the start of play. Goalkeepers with no clean sheets not included in the list.

Rank	No.	Nat.	Goalkeeper	NSL	NSL Cup	Total
1	1	(Australia)	Jeff Olver	4	3	7
2	23	(Australia)	Yakka Banovic	5	1	6
Total				9	4	13
