= 1979 Heidelberg United FC season =

Heidelberg United
1979 season
- Head Coach: John Margaritis; Manny Poulakakis
- Stadium: Olympic Park
- National Soccer League: 2nd
- NSL Cup: Second round
- Top goalscorer: League: Jamie Paton (11); All: Jamie Paton (11)
- Highest home attendance: 12,000 vs. South Melbourne (25 March 1979); National Soccer League
- Lowest home attendance: 1,000 vs. Footscray JUST (10 August 1979); National Soccer League
- Average home league attendance: 4,741
- Biggest win: 4–0 vs. Marconi Fairfield (17 June 1979); National Soccer League
- Biggest defeat: 0–2 (twice); 2–4 (once); 1–3 (once)

The 1979 season was the third in the National Soccer League for Heidelberg United. In addition to the domestic league, they also participated in the NSL Cup. Heidelberg United finished 2nd in their National Soccer League season, and were eliminated in the second round of the NSL Cup.

== Players ==
Note: Flags indicate national team as defined under FIFA eligibility rules; some limited exceptions apply. Players may hold more than one non-FIFA nationality.

No.	Pos.	Nation	Player
1	GK	AUS	Jim Marner
2	DF	SCO	Arthur McMillan
3	DF	AUS	Jim Tansey
5	DF	SCO	Bob Provan
6	MF	AUS	Jimmy Rooney
7	MF	AUS	Ken Taylor
8	MF	AUS	Jim Campbell
9	MF	AUS	Andy Bozikas
10	FW	AUS	Mike Micevski

No.	Pos.	Nation	Player
11	FW	AUS	Branko Buljevic
12	DF	SCO	Pat Bannon (captain)
14	MF	AUS	Theo Selemidis
16	FW	AUS	Gary Cole
18	DF	AUS	Charlie Yankos
19	FW	AUS	Jamie Paton
20	DF	AUS	John Yzendoorn
22	GK	AUS	Jeff Olver
23	GK	AUS	Yakka Banovic

== Competitions ==
=== Overall record ===
Competition	First match	Last match	Starting round	Final position	Record							
Competition	First match	Last match	Starting round	Final position	Pld	W	D	L	GF	GA	GD	Win %
National Soccer League	12 March 1979	23 September 1979	Matchday 1	2nd	26	14	7	5	44	30	+14	53.85
NSL Cup	25 April 1979	23 May 1979	First round	Second round	2	1	0	1	2	3	−1	50.00
Total					28	15	7	6	46	33	+13	53.57

Source: Competitions

=== National Soccer League ===
==== League table ====
Pos	Team	Pld	W	D	L	GF	GA	GD	Pts	Qualification or relegation
1	Marconi Fairfield (C)	26	15	6	5	58	32	+26	40 (Note: A Bonus Point was awarded for victories of 4 goals or more.)	Qualification to Finals series (Note: The Finals series was not considered the championship for the 1979 National Soccer League.)
2	Heidelberg United	26	14	7	5	44	30	+14	36	Qualification to Finals series
3	Sydney City	26	15	3	8	47	29	+18	34	Qualification to Finals series
4	Brisbane City	26	14	5	7	38	30	+8	34	Qualification to Finals series
5	Adelaide City	26	13	6	7	43	27	+16	33	
6	Newcastle KB United	26	11	9	6	43	30	+13	32	
7	West Adelaide	26	10	4	12	28	31	−3	25	
8	APIA Leichhardt	26	11	3	12	29	37	−8	25	
9	Brisbane Lions	26	8	6	12	28	40	−12	22	
10	Footscray JUST	26	8	3	15	29	43	−14	20	
11	St George-Budapest	26	7	6	13	27	43	−16	20	
12	Canberra City	26	6	8	12	25	41	−16	20	
13	Sydney Olympic (R)	26	7	5	14	23	30	−7	19	Relegated to the 1980 NSW State League
14	South Melbourne	26	6	3	17	26	45	−19	16	

Updated to match(es) played on unknown. Source: rsssf.com
Rules for classification: 1) points; 2) goal difference; 3) number of goals scored.
(C) Champions; (R) Relegated

==== Results summary ====
Overall								Home						Away					
Pld	W	D	L	GF	GA	GD	Pts	W	D	L	GF	GA	GD	W	D	L	GF	GA	GD
26	14	7	5	44	30	+14	49	8	4	1	21	12	+9	6	3	4	23	18	+5

Source: worldfootball.net

==== Results by round ====
Round	1	2	3	4	5	6	7	8	9	10	11	12	13	16	17	18	19	20	14	15	22	23	21	24	25	26
Ground	H	A	H	A	H	A	H	A	A	H	A	H	A	H	A	A	H	A	H	A	H	A	H	H	A	H
Result	W	D	W	L	D	L	L	W	L	D	W	D	W	W	W	L	W	D	W	D	W	W	W	D	W	W
Position	4	4	3	5	4	6	9	6	8	9	7	7	6	3	3	4	3	3	5	5	2	2	2	3	2	2
Points	2	3	5	5	6	6	6	8	8	9	11	12	15	17	19	19	21	22	24	25	27	29	31	32	34	36

Source: worldfootball.net
A = Away; H = Home; W = Win; D = Draw; L = Loss

==== Matches ====
Win Draw Loss

12 March 1979 1	Heidelberg United	1–0	St George-Budapest	Melbourne
	Cole 60'	Report		Stadium: Olympic Park; Attendance: 5,000; Referee: Nick Karlich

18 March 1979 2	Footscray JUST	2–2	Heidelberg United	Melbourne
	Ristovski 12'; Picioane 26'	Report	Buljevic 30'; Cole 44' (pen.)	Stadium: Olympic Park; Attendance: 5,000; Referee: Jack Johnston

25 March 1979 3	Heidelberg United	3–0 (Note: Awarded score. Original score 2–2; result was changed after the Australian Soccer Federation determined that South Melbourne fielded ineligible player Tony Tuner.)	South Melbourne	Melbourne
	Buljevic 36'; Taylor ?'	Report	Drakeford 62'; Cummings 79'	Stadium: Olympic Park; Attendance: 12,000; Referee: Tony Beazleigh

1 April 1979 4	West Adelaide	1–0	Heidelberg United	Adelaide
	Boyle 27'	Report		Stadium: Hindmarsh Stadium; Attendance: 5,230; Referee: Don Campbell

8 April 1979 5	Heidelberg United	0–0	Brisbane City	Melbourne
		Report		Stadium: Olympic Park; Attendance: 6,000; Referee: Stewart Mellings

15 April 1979 6	APIA Leichhardt	1–0	Heidelberg United	Sydney
	Reed 36'	Report		Stadium: Wentworth Park; Attendance: 4,267; Referee: Peter Rampley

22 April 1979 7	Heidelberg United	2–4	Newcastle KB United	Melbourne
	Buljevic 78'; Selemidis 88'	Report	Drinkwater 7'; Heys 35', 85'; Boden 49'	Stadium: Olympic Park; Attendance: 3,500; Referee: Chris Bambridge

29 April 1979 8	Sydney Olympic	1–2	Heidelberg United	Sydney
	Wilson 82'	Report	Bozikas 14', 90'	Stadium: Pratten Park; Attendance: 2,430; Referee: Henry Witschge

6 May 1979 9	Adelaide City	2–0	Heidelberg United	Adelaide
14:30 AEST	Perin 63'; Muniz 82'	Report		Stadium: Olympic Sports Field; Attendance: 4,620; Referee: Don Campbell

13 May 1979 10	Heidelberg United	0–0	Canberra City	Melbourne
		Report		Stadium: Olympic Park; Attendance: 4,000; Referee: Jack Johnston

3 June 1979 11	Brisbane Lions	1–3	Heidelberg United	Brisbane
	Fairbrother 7'	Report	Cole 9'; Bennett 39' (o.g.); Paton 88'	Stadium: Perry Park; Attendance: 1,200; Referee: Peter Rampley

10 June 1979 12	Heidelberg United	2–2	Sydney City	Melbourne
	Campbell 54'; Paton 69'	Report	Barnes 44'; Smith 80'	Stadium: Olympic Park; Attendance: 4,500; Referee: Chris Bambridge

17 June 1979 13	Marconi Fairfield	0–4	Heidelberg United	Sydney
15:00 AEST		Report	Yzendoorn 65'; Paton 66'; Cole 70', 73'	Stadium: Marconi Oval; Attendance: 4,362; Referee: Des Miles

8 July 1979 16	Heidelberg United	3–1	West Adelaide	Melbourne
	Buljevic 26'; Taylor 69'; Cole 84'	Report	Kosmina 60'	Stadium: Olympic Park; Attendance: 4,500; Referee: Tony Boskovic

15 July 1979 17	South Melbourne	0–1	Heidelberg United	Melbourne
		Report	Taylor 3'	Stadium: Middle Park Soccer Stadium; Attendance: 12,000; Referee: Tim Davies

22 July 1979 18	Brisbane City	3–1	Heidelberg United	Brisbane
	Low 3'; Perry 18'; Campbell 49'	Report	Taylor 87'	Stadium: Perry Park; Attendance: 3,750; Referee: Jim Reeves

29 July 1979 19	Heidelberg United	2–1	APIA Leichhardt	Melbourne
	Paton 2'; Cole 71'	Report	Yzendoorn 43' (o.g.)	Stadium: Olympic Park; Attendance: 7,000; Referee: Tony Beazleigh

4 August 1979 20	Newcastle KB United	3–3	Heidelberg United	Newcastle
14:30 AEST	Senkalski 8'; Heys 28'; Boden 48'	Report	Buljevic 36'; Tansey 76'; Cole 77'	Stadium: Newcastle International Sports Centre; Attendance: 10,134; Referee: Bill Jones

10 August 1979 14	Heidelberg United	2–1	Footscray JUST	Melbourne
	Paton 20'; Cole 77'	Report	Palinkas 62'	Stadium: Olympic Park; Attendance: 1,000; Referee: Chris Bambridge

29 August 1979 15	St George-Budapest	2–2	Heidelberg United	Sydney
	O'Connor 82', 85'	Report	Paton 35'; Campbell 60'	Stadium: St George Stadium; Attendance: 2,466; Referee: Tim Davies

26 August 1979 22	Heidelberg United	1–0	Adelaide City	Melbourne
	Paton 78'	Report		Stadium: Olympic Park; Attendance: 4,000; Referee: Doug Rennie

1 September 1979 23	Canberra City	1–2	Heidelberg United	Canberra
15:00 AEST	Farrell 32'	Report	Buljevic 2'; Milovanovic 75' (o.g.)	Stadium: Bruce Stadium; Attendance: 2,128; Referee: Ken Allen

5 September 1979 21	Heidelberg United	2–1	Sydney Olympic	Melbourne
	Paton 1'; Yzendoorn 77'	Report	Eaton 70'	Stadium: Olympic Park; Attendance: 2,000; Referee: Chris Bambridge

9 September 1979 24	Heidelberg United	0–0	Brisbane Lions	Melbourne
		Report		Stadium: Olympic Park; Attendance: 2,500; Referee: Graham Neal

16 September 1979 25	Sydney City	1–3	Heidelberg United	Sydney
	Silva 31'	Report	Taylor 11'; Cole 45'; Eaton 60'	Stadium: Wentworth Park; Attendance: 1,654; Referee: Dave Nugent

23 September 1979 26	Heidelberg United	3–2	Marconi Fairfield	Melbourne
	Russell 4' (o.g.); Paton 33', 56'	Report	Jankovics 5'; Campbell 7' (o.g.)	Stadium: Olympic Park; Attendance: 5,630; Referee: Don Campbell

=== NSL Cup ===
Win Draw Loss

25 April 1979 First round	Heidelberg United	2–1	South Melbourne	Melbourne
	Campbell 60', 63'	Report	Christopoulos 15'	Stadium: Olympic Park; Attendance: 6,000; Referee: Graham Neale

23 May 1979 Second round	Footscray JUST	2–0	Heidelberg United	Melbourne
	Ilioski 28'; Palinkas 87'	Report		Stadium: Olympic Park; Attendance: 3,000; Referee: Chris Bambridge

== Statistics ==
=== Appearances and goals ===
Includes all competitions. Players with no appearances not included in the list.

No.	Pos.	Nat.	Player	National Soccer League		NSL Cup		Total	
No.	Pos.	Nat.	Player	Apps	Goals	Apps	Goals	Apps	Goals
1	GK	(Australia)	Jim Mariner	1	0	0	0	1	0
2	DF	(Scotland)	Arthur McMillan	20	0	2	0	22	0
3	DF	(Australia)	Jim Tansey	26	1	2	0	28	1
5	DF	(Scotland)	Bob Provan	18	0	2	0	20	0
6	MF	(Australia)	Jimmy Rooney	24+1	0	1	0	26	0
7	MF	(Australia)	Ken Taylor	22+1	5	2	0	25	5
8	MF	(Australia)	Jim Campbell	24	2	2	2	26	4
9	MF	(Australia)	Andy Bozikas	12+5	2	0+1	0	18	2
10	FW	(Australia)	Mike Micevski	0+3	0	0	0	3	0
11	FW	(Australia)	Branko Buljevic	26	6	2	0	28	6
12	DF	(Scotland)	Pat Bannon	23+2	0	2	0	27	0
14	MF	(Australia)	Theo Selemidis	4+6	1	2	0	12	1
16	FW	(Australia)	Gary Cole	26	10	2	0	28	10
18	DF	(Australia)	Charlie Yankos	1	0	0	0	1	0
19	FW	(Australia)	Jamie Paton	13+3	11	0+1	0	17	11
20	DF	(Australia)	John Yzendoorn	16	2	1	0	17	2
23	GK	(Australia)	Yakka Banovic	25	0	2	0	27	0
Player(s) transferred out but featured this season
4	DF	(Scotland)	Jim O'Reilly	5	0	0	0	5	0

=== Disciplinary record ===
Includes all competitions. The list is sorted by squad number when total cards are equal. Players with no cards not included in the list.

Rank	No.	Pos.	Nat.	Player	National Soccer League			NSL Cup			Total		
Rank	No.	Pos.	Nat.	Player	Yellow card	Second yellow card	Red card	Yellow card	Second yellow card	Red card	Yellow card	Second yellow card	Red card
1	7	MF	(Australia)	Ken Taylor	3	0	0	0	0	0	3	0	0
1	12	DF	(Scotland)	Pat Bannon	3	0	0	0	0	0	3	0	0
3	20	DF	(Australia)	John Yzendoorn	2	0	0	0	0	0	2	0	0
4	2	DF	(Scotland)	Arthur McMillan	1	0	0	0	0	0	1	0	0
4	3	DF	(Australia)	Jim Tansey	1	0	0	0	0	0	1	0	0
4	4	DF	(Scotland)	Jim O'Reilly	1	0	0	0	0	0	1	0	0
4	5	DF	(Scotland)	Bob Provan	1	0	0	0	0	0	1	0	0
4	6	MF	(Australia)	Jimmy Rooney	1	0	0	0	0	0	1	0	0
4	14	MF	(Australia)	Theo Selemidis	0	0	0	1	0	0	1	0	0
4	16	FW	(Australia)	Gary Cole	1	0	0	0	0	0	1	0	0
Total					14	0	0	1	0	0	15	0	0

=== Clean sheets ===
Includes all competitions. The list is sorted by squad number when total clean sheets are equal. Numbers in parentheses represent games where both goalkeepers participated and both kept a clean sheet; the number in parentheses is awarded to the goalkeeper who was substituted on, whilst a full clean sheet is awarded to the goalkeeper who was on the field at the start of play. Goalkeepers with no clean sheets not included in the list.

Rank	No.	Nat.	Goalkeeper	NSL	NSL Cup	Total
1	23	(Australia)	Yakka Banovic	7	0	7
2	1	(Australia)	Jim Marner	1	0	1
Total				8	0	8
