= 1981 Heidelberg United FC season =

Heidelberg United
1981 season
- Head Coach: Manny Poulakais; Jimmy Rooney; Len McKendry
- Stadium: Olympic Park; Olympic Park No. 2
- National Soccer League: 8th
- NSL Cup: Quarter-finals
- Top goalscorer: League: Gary Cole (16); All: Gary Cole (17)
- Highest home attendance: 8,000 vs. Preston Makedonia (8 March 1981); National Soccer League
- Lowest home attendance: 500 vs. Brisbane Lions (26 August 1981); National Soccer League
- Average home league attendance: 3,531
- Biggest win: 5–0 vs. West Adelaide (9 August 1981); National Soccer League
- Biggest defeat: 0–3 vs. Wollongong City (22 February 1981); National Soccer League

The 1981 season was the fifth in the National Soccer League for Heidelberg United. In addition to the domestic league, they also participated in the NSL Cup. Heidelberg United finished 8th in their National Soccer League season and were eliminated in the quarter-finals of the NSL Cup.

== Players ==
Note: Flags indicate national team as defined under FIFA eligibility rules; some limited exceptions apply. Players may hold more than one non-FIFA nationality.

| No. | Pos. | Nation | Player |
|---|---|---|---|
| 1 | GK | AUS | Jeff Olver |
| 2 | DF | SCO | Arthur McMillan |
| 3 | DF | AUS | Jim Tansey |
| 4 | DF | AUS | John Yzendoorn |
| 5 | DF | SCO | Pat Bannon |
| 6 | MF | AUS | Theo Selemidis |
| 7 | MF | AUS | Jimmy Rooney |
| 8 | MF | AUS | Jim Campbell |
| 9 | FW | AUS | Jamie Paton |
| 10 | FW | AUS | George Pavlidis |
| 11 | MF | AUS | Andy Bozikas |
| 12 | DF | AUS | Charlie Yankos |

| No. | Pos. | Nation | Player |
|---|---|---|---|
| 14 | DF | SCO | Bob Provan |
| 15 | MF | AUS | Ken Taylor |
| 16 | FW | AUS | Gary Cole |
| 17 | MF | ENG | Jim Williams |
| 20 | GK | AUS | Jack Reilly |
| — | MF | AUS | George Itsou |
| — | DF | ENG | Don MacLeod |
| — | | IRL | Joe McGrory |
| — | DF | AUS | John Mihailidis |
| — | | IRL | Liam Monagle |
| — | FW | AUS | Tom Tasevski |

== Competitions ==
=== Overall record ===
| Competition | First match | Last match | Starting round | Final position | Record | | | | | | | |
| Competition | First match | Last match | Starting round | Final position | Pld | W | D | L | GF | GA | GD | Win % |
|---|---|---|---|---|---|---|---|---|---|---|---|---|
| National Soccer League | 15 February 1981 | 13 September 1981 | Matchday 1 | 8th | 30 | 12 | 7 | 11 | 48 | 40 | +8 | 40.00 |
| NSL Cup | 11 March 1981 | 17 June 1981 | First round | Quarter-finals | 3 | 1 | 1 | 1 | 3 | 2 | +1 | 33.33 |
| Total | | | | | 33 | 13 | 8 | 12 | 51 | 42 | +9 | 39.39 |

Source: Competitions

=== National Soccer League ===
==== League table ====
| Pos | Team | Pld | W | D | L | GF | GA | GD | Pts | Relegation |
|---|---|---|---|---|---|---|---|---|---|---|
| 1 | Sydney City (C) | 30 | 19 | 5 | 6 | 59 | 30 | +29 | 43 | |
| 2 | South Melbourne | 30 | 13 | 13 | 4 | 41 | 27 | +14 | 39 | |
| 3 | Brisbane City | 30 | 12 | 11 | 7 | 37 | 25 | +12 | 35 | |
| 4 | APIA Leichhardt | 30 | 12 | 11 | 7 | 39 | 33 | +6 | 35 | |
| 5 | Canberra City | 30 | 13 | 7 | 10 | 41 | 32 | +9 | 33 | |
| 6 | Brisbane Lions | 30 | 11 | 11 | 8 | 41 | 33 | +8 | 33 | |
| 7 | Adelaide City | 30 | 13 | 6 | 11 | 46 | 42 | +4 | 32 | |
| 8 | Heidelberg United | 30 | 12 | 7 | 11 | 48 | 40 | +8 | 31 | |
| 9 | Sydney Olympic | 30 | 11 | 9 | 10 | 46 | 46 | 0 | 31 | |
| 10 | Newcastle KB United | 30 | 11 | 8 | 11 | 41 | 41 | 0 | 30 | |
| 11 | Wollongong City | 30 | 8 | 12 | 10 | 35 | 39 | −4 | 28 | |
| 12 | Preston Makedonia | 30 | 9 | 7 | 14 | 39 | 41 | −2 | 25 | |
| 13 | Footscray JUST | 30 | 9 | 7 | 14 | 32 | 48 | −16 | 25 | |
| 14 | Marconi Fairfield | 30 | 9 | 7 | 14 | 23 | 45 | −22 | 25 | |
| 15 | Blacktown City (R) | 30 | 6 | 9 | 15 | 32 | 47 | −15 | 21 | Relegated to the 1982 NSW State League |
| 16 | West Adelaide | 30 | 5 | 4 | 21 | 26 | 57 | −31 | 14 | |

Updated to match(es) played on unknown. Source: rsssf.com
Rules for classification: 1) points; 2) goal difference; 3) number of goals scored.
(C) Champions; (R) Relegated

==== Results summary ====
| Overall | | | | | | | | Home | | | | | | Away | | | | | |
| Pld | W | D | L | GF | GA | GD | Pts | W | D | L | GF | GA | GD | W | D | L | GF | GA | GD |
|---|---|---|---|---|---|---|---|---|---|---|---|---|---|---|---|---|---|---|---|
| 30 | 12 | 7 | 11 | 48 | 40 | +8 | 43 | 6 | 4 | 5 | 19 | 16 | +3 | 6 | 3 | 6 | 29 | 24 | +5 |

Source: worldfootball.net

==== Results by round ====
| Round | 1 | 2 | 3 | 4 | 5 | 10 | 6 | 7 | 8 | 9 | 11 | 12 | 14 | 15 | 16 | 17 | 18 | 19 | 20 | 21 | 22 | 24 | 25 | 26 | 23 | 27 | 13 | 28 | 29 | 30 |
|---|---|---|---|---|---|---|---|---|---|---|---|---|---|---|---|---|---|---|---|---|---|---|---|---|---|---|---|---|---|---|
| Ground | A | H | A | H | A | H | A | A | H | A | H | A | A | H | A | H | A | H | A | H | A | A | A | H | H | A | H | H | A | H |
| Result | D | L | L | L | L | W | W | L | D | L | W | D | L | L | W | D | W | L | W | L | W | L | W | W | D | D | D | W | W | W |
| Position | 7 | 15 | 16 | 16 | 16 | 14 | 15 | 15 | 16 | 16 | 14 | 13 | 14 | 14 | 13 | 13 | 12 | 12 | 12 | 12 | 11 | 13 | 12 | 11 | 11 | 11 | 13 | 10 | 8 | 8 |
| Points | 1 | 1 | 1 | 1 | 1 | 3 | 5 | 5 | 6 | 6 | 8 | 9 | 9 | 9 | 11 | 12 | 14 | 14 | 16 | 16 | 18 | 18 | 20 | 22 | 23 | 24 | 25 | 27 | 29 | 31 |

Source: worldfootball.net
A = Away; H = Home; W = Win; D = Draw; L = Loss

==== Matches ====
Win Draw Loss

| 15 February 1981 1 | APIA Leichhardt | 2–2 | Heidelberg United | Sydney |
| | Hughes 13', 89' | Report | Cole 25' (pen.); Bozikas 86' | Stadium: Lambert Park; Attendance: 4,025; Referee: Peter Rampley |

| 22 February 1981 2 | Heidelberg United | 0–3 | Wollongong City | Melbourne |
| | | Report | McBreen 34'; Morton 51'; Dunleavy 72' | Stadium: Olympic Park No. 2 Attendance: 5,200; Referee: David Yelland |

| 1 March 1981 3 | South Melbourne | 2–1 | Heidelberg United | Melbourne |
| | Buljevic 13'; Xanthopoulos 83' | Report | Paton 46' | Stadium: Middle Park Soccer Stadium; Attendance: 12,500; Referee: Jack Johnston |

| 8 March 1981 4 | Heidelberg United | 2–3 | Preston Makedonia | Melbourne |
| | Paton 71', 77' | Report | Ward 3'; Ollerton 8'; Brown 77' | Stadium: Olympic Park; Attendance: 8,000; Referee: Dennis Voutsinas |

| 15 March 1981 5 | Adelaide City | 3–1 | Heidelberg United | Adelaide |
| | Villani 8'; B. Nyskohus 78'; J. Nyskohus 89' (pen.) | Report | Cole 11' | Stadium: Hindmarsh Stadium; Attendance: 3,576; Referee: Graham Neal |

| 22 March 1981 10 | Heidelberg United | 1–0 | Sydney Olympic | Melbourne |
| | Campbell 22' | Report | | Stadium: Olympic Park; Attendance: 4,637; Referee: David Yelland |

| 29 March 1981 6 | Heidelberg United | 2–0 | Brisbane City | Melbourne |
| | Bozikas 4'; Yankos 59' | Report | | Stadium: Olympic Park No. 2 Attendance: 3,500; Referee: Stewart Mellings |

| 5 April 1981 7 | Sydney City | 1–0 | Heidelberg United | Sydney |
| | Boden 36' | Report | | Stadium: ES Marks Athletics Field; Attendance: 2,611; Referee: Ken Small |

| 12 April 1981 8 | Heidelberg United | 1–1 | Canberra City | Melbourne |
| | Taylor 58' | Report | J. O'Shea 68' | Stadium: Olympic Park; Attendance: 3,192; Referee: Evan Venios |

| 19 April 1981 9 | Marconi Fairfield | 3–1 | Heidelberg United | Sydney |
| | Sharne 10', 38'; Jankovics 90' | Report | Yzendoorn 60' | Stadium: Marconi Oval; Attendance: 2,500; Referee: Peter Rampley |

| 3 May 1981 11 | Heidelberg United | 2–0 | West Adelaide | Melbourne |
| | Tansey 28'; Tymczyszyn 83' (o.g.) | Report | | Stadium: Olympic Park; Attendance: 3,200; Referee: Dennis Voutsinas |

| 10 May 1981 12 | Footscray JUST | 2–2 | Heidelberg United | Melbourne |
| | Belic 19'; Jovanovic 62' | Report | Monagle 64'; McGrory 82' | Stadium: Schintler Reserve; Attendance: 3,500; Referee: Stewart Mellings |

| 24 May 1981 14 | Blacktown City | 3–1 | Heidelberg United | Sydney |
| | O'Donnell 53' (pen.); Djordjevic 64'; Burrows 68' | Report | Rooney 14' | Stadium: Gabbie Stadium; Attendance: 2,876; Referee: Tim Davies |

| 31 May 1981 15 | Heidelberg United | 1–2 | Newcastle KB United | Melbourne |
| | Campbell 42' | Report | Storey 47', 82' | Stadium: Olympic Park; Attendance: 2,000; Referee: Evan Venios |

| 7 June 1981 16 | Wollongong City | 3–4 | Heidelberg United | Wollongong |
| | Lathan 20'; Adam 87'; McBreen 88' | Report | Cole 29', 73'; Paton 51'; McGrory 65' | Stadium: Wollongong Showground; Attendance: 4,371; Referee: Doug Rennie (Barry Wilkinson 80') |

| 14 June 1981 17 | Heidelberg United | 0–0 | South Melbourne | Melbourne |
| | | Report | | Stadium: Olympic Park; Attendance: 3,241; Referee: Peter Rampley |

| 21 June 1981 18 | Preston Makedonia | 0–2 | Heidelberg United | Melbourne |
| | | Report | Paton 60'; Cole 70' | Stadium: B.T. Connor Reserve; Attendance: 5,000; Referee: Chris Bambridge |

| 28 June 1981 19 | Heidelberg United | 1–2 | Adelaide City | Melbourne |
| | Cole 51' | Report | Northcote 10'; J. Nyskohus 49' (pen.) | Stadium: Olympic Park; Attendance: 4,000; Referee: Bob Mee |

| 5 July 1981 20 | Brisbane City | 1–2 | Heidelberg United | Brisbane |
| | P. Wilkinson 77' | Report | Yzendoorn 79'; Campbell 90' | Stadium: Spencer Park; Attendance: 2,000; Referee: Dave Nugent |

| 12 July 1981 21 | Heidelberg United | 0–1 | Sydney City | Melbourne |
| | | Report | Barnes 75' | Stadium: Olympic Park; Attendance: 4,500; Referee: Jack Johnston |

| 19 July 1981 22 | Canberra City | 1–5 | Heidelberg United | Canberra |
| | Purdie 17' | Report | Cole 47', 60'; Paton 75', 90'; Tasevski 90' | Stadium: Bruce Stadium; Attendance: 4,060; Referee: Tony Boskovic |

| 2 August 1981 24 | Sydney Olympic | 2–1 | Heidelberg United | Sydney |
| | K. Wilson 10', 47' (pen.) | Report | Campbell 68' | Stadium: Pratten Park; Attendance: 5,600; Referee: Col Amos |

| 9 August 1981 25 | West Adelaide | 0–5 | Heidelberg United | Adelaide |
| | | Report | Cole 47', 61', 74'; Campbell 77', 84' | Stadium: Hindmarsh Stadium; Attendance: 3,500; Referee: Don Campbell |

| 16 August 1981 26 | Heidelberg United | 2–0 | Footscray JUST | Melbourne |
| | Paton 84'; Cole 88' | Report | | Stadium: Olympic Park; Attendance: 4,000; Referee: Graham Neal |

| 19 August 1981 23 | Heidelberg United | 1–1 | Marconi Fairfield | Melbourne |
| | Yzendoorn 39' | Report | Krncevic 81' | Stadium: Olympic Park; Attendance: 3,000; Referee: Chris Bambridge |

| 23 August 1981 27 | Brisbane Lions | 0–0 | Heidelberg United | Brisbane |
| | | Report | | Stadium: Richlands Stadium; Attendance: 1,500; Referee: Col Amos |

| 26 August 1981 13 | Heidelberg United | 2–2 | Brisbane Lions | Melbourne |
| | Taylor 25'; Bozikas 44' | Report | Williamson 9'; Daunt 84' | Stadium: Olympic Park; Attendance: 500; Referee: Jim Fearn |

| 30 August 1981 28 | Heidelberg United | 3–1 | Blacktown City | Melbourne |
| | Yankos 13'; Selemidis 17'; Cole 82' | Report | Rasmussen 79' | Stadium: Olympic Park; Attendance: 2,000; Referee: Barry Harwood |

| 6 September 1981 29 | Newcastle KB United | 1–2 | Heidelberg United | Newcastle |
| | Stamp 75' | Report | Cole 20', 52' | Stadium: Newcastle International Sports Centre; Attendance: 4,531; Referee: Dave Nugent |

| 13 September 1981 30 | Heidelberg United | 1–0 | APIA Leichhardt | Melbourne |
| | Cole 16' | Report | | Stadium: Olympic Park No. 2 Attendance: 2,000; Referee: Chris Bambridge |

=== NSL Cup ===
Win Draw Loss

| 11 March 1981 First round | Heidelberg United | 2–0 | South Melbourne | Melbourne |
| | Bozikas 52'; Selemidis 71' | Report | | Stadium: Olympic Park; Attendance: 6,300; Referee: Dennis Voutsinas |

| 25 March 1981 Second round | Heidelberg United | 1–1 (a.e.t.) (5–3 p) | Preston Makedonia | Melbourne |
| | Cole 63' | Report | McMillan 52' | Stadium: Olympic Park; Attendance: 6,000; Referee: Bob Mee |
| | Penalties |
| | Cole (penalty scored); Yzendoorn (penalty scored); Taylor (penalty scored); Campbell (penalty scored); Rooney (penalty scored) | | (penalty scored) Ollerton; (penalty missed) Flavell; (penalty scored) Petrovski; (penalty scored) Lucchesi |

| 17 June 1981 Quarter-finals | Heidelberg United | 0–1 | Adelaide City | Melbourne |
| | | Report | Fashanu 87' | Stadium: Olympic Park; Attendance: 2,000; Referee: Tony Boskovic |

== Statistics ==
=== Appearances and goals ===
Includes all competitions. Players with no appearances not included in the list.

| No. | Pos. | Nat. | Player | National Soccer League | | NSL Cup | | Total | |
| No. | Pos. | Nat. | Player | Apps | Goals | Apps | Goals | Apps | Goals |
|---|---|---|---|---|---|---|---|---|---|
| 1 | GK | (Australia) | Jeff Olver | 27 | 0 | 1 | 0 | 28 | 0 |
| 2 | DF | (Scotland) | Arthur McMillan | 30 | 0 | 3 | 0 | 33 | 0 |
| 3 | DF | (Australia) | Jim Tansey | 10 | 1 | 1 | 0 | 11 | 1 |
| 4 | DF | (Australia) | John Yzendoorn | 30 | 3 | 3 | 0 | 33 | 3 |
| 5 | DF | (Scotland) | Pat Bannon | 5 | 0 | 1 | 0 | 6 | 0 |
| 6 | MF | (Australia) | Theo Selemidis | 30 | 1 | 3 | 1 | 33 | 2 |
| 7 | MF | (Australia) | Jimmy Rooney | 28+2 | 1 | 3 | 0 | 33 | 1 |
| 8 | MF | (Australia) | Jim Campbell | 25+2 | 6 | 2 | 0 | 29 | 6 |
| 9 | FW | (Australia) | Jamie Paton | 22 | 8 | 2 | 0 | 24 | 8 |
| 10 | FW | (Australia) | George Pavlidis | 0+1 | 0 | 0 | 0 | 1 | 0 |
| 11 | MF | (Australia) | Andy Bozikas | 18+4 | 3 | 2 | 1 | 24 | 4 |
| 12 | DF | (Australia) | Charlie Yankos | 22 | 2 | 2 | 0 | 24 | 2 |
| 14 | DF | (Scotland) | Bob Provan | 24+4 | 0 | 3 | 0 | 31 | 0 |
| 15 | MF | (Australia) | Ken Taylor | 12+3 | 2 | 2 | 0 | 17 | 2 |
| 16 | FW | (Australia) | Gary Cole | 29+1 | 16 | 3 | 1 | 33 | 17 |
| 17 | MF | (England) | Jim Williams | 0 | 0 | 0 | 0 | 0 | 0 |
| 20 | GK | (Australia) | Jack Reilly | 3 | 0 | 2 | 0 | 5 | 0 |
| — | MF | (Australia) | George Itsou | 0+1 | 0 | 0 | 0 | 1 | 0 |
| — | DF | (England) | Don MacLeod | 1+1 | 0 | 0 | 0 | 2 | 0 |
| — | — | (Republic of Ireland) | Joe McGrory | 5+2 | 2 | 0 | 0 | 7 | 2 |
| — | DF | (Australia) | John Mihailidis | 3 | 0 | 0 | 0 | 3 | 0 |
| — | — | (Republic of Ireland) | Liam Monagle | 3+3 | 1 | 0 | 0 | 6 | 1 |
| — | FW | (Australia) | Tom Tasevski | 3+2 | 1 | 0+2 | 0 | 7 | 1 |

=== Disciplinary record ===
Includes all competitions. The list is sorted by squad number when total cards are equal. Players with no cards not included in the list.

| Rank | No. | Pos. | Nat. | Player | National Soccer League | | | NSL Cup | | | Total | | |
| Rank | No. | Pos. | Nat. | Player | Yellow card | Second yellow card | Red card | Yellow card | Second yellow card | Red card | Yellow card | Second yellow card | Red card |
|---|---|---|---|---|---|---|---|---|---|---|---|---|---|
| 1 | 4 | DF | (Australia) | John Yzendoorn | 3 | 0 | 0 | 0 | 0 | 0 | 3 | 0 | 0 |
| 1 | 8 | MF | (Australia) | Jim Campbell | 3 | 0 | 0 | 0 | 0 | 0 | 3 | 0 | 0 |
| 1 | 16 | FW | (Australia) | Gary Cole | 2 | 0 | 0 | 1 | 0 | 0 | 3 | 0 | 0 |
| 4 | 1 | GK | (Australia) | Jeff Olver | 1 | 0 | 0 | 1 | 0 | 0 | 2 | 0 | 0 |
| 4 | 2 | DF | (Scotland) | Arthur McMillan | 2 | 0 | 0 | 0 | 0 | 0 | 2 | 0 | 0 |
| 4 | 7 | MF | (Australia) | Jimmy Rooney | 2 | 0 | 0 | 0 | 0 | 0 | 2 | 0 | 0 |
| 4 | 14 | DF | (Scotland) | Bob Provan | 1 | 0 | 0 | 1 | 0 | 0 | 2 | 0 | 0 |
| 4 | 15 | MF | (Australia) | Ken Taylor | 2 | 0 | 0 | 0 | 0 | 0 | 2 | 0 | 0 |
| 9 | 3 | DF | (Australia) | Jim Tansey | 1 | 0 | 0 | 0 | 0 | 0 | 1 | 0 | 0 |
| 9 | 6 | MF | (Australia) | Theo Selemidis | 1 | 0 | 0 | 0 | 0 | 0 | 1 | 0 | 0 |
| 9 | 9 | FW | (Australia) | Jamie Paton | 1 | 0 | 0 | 0 | 0 | 0 | 1 | 0 | 0 |
| 9 | 12 | DF | (Australia) | Charlie Yankos | 1 | 0 | 0 | 0 | 0 | 0 | 1 | 0 | 0 |
| Total | | | | | 20 | 0 | 0 | 3 | 0 | 0 | 23 | 0 | 0 |

=== Clean sheets ===
Includes all competitions. The list is sorted by squad number when total clean sheets are equal. Numbers in parentheses represent games where both goalkeepers participated and both kept a clean sheet; the number in parentheses is awarded to the goalkeeper who was substituted on, whilst a full clean sheet is awarded to the goalkeeper who was on the field at the start of play. Goalkeepers with no clean sheets not included in the list.

| Rank | No. | Nat. | Goalkeeper | NSL | NSL Cup | Total |
|---|---|---|---|---|---|---|
| 1 | 1 | (Australia) | Jeff Olver | 8 | 0 | 8 |
| 2 | 20 | (Australia) | Jack Reilly | 1 | 1 | 2 |
| Total | | | | 9 | 1 | 10 |
