= 1982 Heidelberg United FC season =

Heidelberg United
1982 season
- Head Coach: Len McKendry
- Stadium: Olympic Park
- National Soccer League: 4th
- NSL Cup: Runners-up
- Top goalscorer: League: Jim Campbell; Gary Cole (12 each); All: Jim Campbell; Gary Cole (13 each)
- Highest home attendance: 6,000 vs. Preston Makedonia (11 July 1982); National Soccer League vs. South Melbourne (25 July 1982); National Soccer League
- Lowest home attendance: 1,000 (3 matches)
- Average home league attendance: 3,453
- Biggest win: 3–1 (3 times); 2–0 (3 times)
- Biggest defeat: 0–4 vs. West Adelaide (A) (2 May 1982); National Soccer League
Home colours	Away colours

The 1982 season was the sixth in the National Soccer League for Heidelberg United Football Club. In addition to the domestic league, they also participated in the NSL Cup. Heidelberg United finished 4th in their National Soccer League season, and were eliminated in the final of the NSL Cup.

== Players ==
Note: Flags indicate national team as defined under FIFA eligibility rules; some limited exceptions apply. Players may hold more than one non-FIFA nationality.

No.	Pos.	Nation	Player
1	GK	AUS	Jeff Olver
2	DF	SCO	Arthur McMillan
3	DF	AUS	Jim Tansey
4	DF	AUS	John Yzendoorn
5	DF	ENG	Don MacLeod
6	MF	AUS	Jimmy Rooney
7	MF	AUS	Theo Selemidis
8	MF	AUS	Jim Campbell
9	FW	AUS	Jamie Paton
10	DF	AUS	Charlie Yankos

No.	Pos.	Nation	Player
11	MF	AUS	Andy Bozikas
14	DF	SCO	Bob Provan
15	MF	AUS	Ken Taylor
16	FW	AUS	Gary Cole
18	FW	AUS	Tom Tasevski
—	DF	AUS	Claude Avian
—		AUS	Chris Bekiaris
—	MF	CHI	Juan Toro
—	MF	AUS	Mike Valentine

== Competitions ==
=== Overall record ===
Competition	First match	Last match	Starting round	Final position	Record							
Competition	First match	Last match	Starting round	Final position	Pld	W	D	L	GF	GA	GD	Win %
National Soccer League	13 February 1982	5 September 1982	Matchday 1	4th	30	13	8	9	42	37	+5	43.33
NSL Cup	14 June 1982	12 September 1982	First round	Runners-up	4	2	1	1	5	3	+2	50.00
Total					34	15	9	10	47	40	+7	44.12

Source: Competitions

=== National Soccer League ===
==== League table ====
Pos	Team	Pld	W	D	L	GF	GA	GD	Pts	Relegation
1	Sydney City (C)	30	20	5	5	68	28	+40	45	Qualification to Finals series (Note: The Finals series was not considered the championship for the 1982 National Soccer League.)
2	St George-Budapest	30	14	8	8	47	40	+7	36	Qualification to Finals series
3	Wollongong City	30	16	3	11	43	46	−3	35	Qualification to Finals series
4	Heidelberg United	30	13	8	9	42	37	+5	34	Qualification to Finals series
5	Preston Makedonia	30	12	10	8	45	41	+4	34	
6	South Melbourne	30	11	9	10	46	37	+9	31	
7	APIA Leichhardt	30	12	7	11	49	54	−5	31	
8	Sydney Olympic	30	12	6	12	52	42	+10	30	
9	West Adelaide	30	10	8	12	44	40	+4	28	
10	Marconi Fairfield	30	12	4	14	44	43	+1	28	
11	Brisbane Lions	30	10	8	12	39	42	−3	28	
12	Newcastle KB United	30	10	7	13	43	52	−9	27	
13	Adelaide City	30	6	12	12	36	44	−8	24	
14	Footscray JUST	30	5	14	11	34	46	−12	24	
15	Canberra City	30	7	10	13	37	54	−17	24	
16	Brisbane City	30	5	11	14	32	55	−23	21	

Source: rsssf.com
Rules for classification: 1) points; 2) goal difference; 3) number of goals scored.
(C) Champions

==== Results summary ====
Overall								Home						Away					
Pld	W	D	L	GF	GA	GD	Pts	W	D	L	GF	GA	GD	W	D	L	GF	GA	GD
30	13	8	9	42	37	+5	47	10	3	2	25	14	+11	3	5	7	17	23	−6

Source: worldfootball.net

==== Results by round ====
Round	1	2	3	4	5	6	7	8	9	10	11	12	13	14	15	16	17	18	19	20	21	22	23	24	25	26	27	28	29	30
Ground	A	H	H	A	H	A	H	A	H	A	H	A	H	A	H	A	H	H	A	H	A	H	A	H	A	H	A	H	A	A
Result	W	W	D	L	W	L	W	D	L	W	W	L	W	D	D	D	L	W	L	W	L	D	L	W	W	W	D	W	D	L
Position	3	2	2	5	3	7	4	5	8	6	4	7	6	5	6	6	6	5	6	4	5	6	6	6	4	4	3	3	3	4
Points	2	4	5	5	7	7	9	10	10	12	14	14	16	17	18	19	19	21	21	23	23	24	24	26	28	30	31	33	34	34

Source: worldfootball.net
A = Away; H = Home; W = Win; D = Draw; L = Loss

==== Matches ====
Win Draw Loss

13 February 1982 1	Canberra City	1–3	Heidelberg United	Canberra
	Gibson 17'	Report	Cole 15', 76'; Campbell 87'	Stadium: Bruce Stadium; Attendance: 2,500; Referee: Bob Mee

21 February 1982 2	Heidelberg United	2–0	Newcastle KB United	Melbourne
	Cole 46'; Selemidis 68'	Report		Stadium: Olympic Park No. 2 Attendance: 3,000; Referee: Evan Venios

27 February 1982 3	Heidelberg United	2–2	Sydney Olympic	Melbourne
	Campbell 28'; Cole 51'	Report	Koussas 80'; Gavin 83'	Stadium: Olympic Park; Attendance: 4,500; Referee: David Yelland

6 March 1982 4	St George-Budapest	2–1	Heidelberg United	Sydney
	Marton 62'; Lerinc 66'	Report	Campbell 24'	Stadium: St George Stadium; Attendance: 3,454; Referee: Tony Boskovic

13 March 1982 5	Heidelberg United	2–1	Adelaide City	Melbourne
	Cole 29'; Campbell 49'	Report	Northcote 21'	Stadium: Olympic Park; Attendance: 2,500; Referee: Jim Fearn

21 March 1982 6	Marconi Fairfield	1–0	Heidelberg United	Sydney
	Calderan 11'	Report		Stadium: Marconi Stadium; Attendance: 2,128; Referee: Richard Lorenc

28 March 1982 7	Heidelberg United	2–0	Brisbane Lions	Melbourne
	Campbell 33'; MacLeod 67'	Report		Stadium: Olympic Park; Attendance: 2,000; Referee: Chris Bambridge

4 April 1982 8	Preston Makedonia	0–0	Heidelberg United	Melbourne
		Report		Stadium: B.T. Connor Reserve; Attendance: 6,500; Referee: Dennis Voutsinas

11 April 1982 9	Heidelberg United	0–2	Wollongong City	Melbourne
		Report	Cotton 24'; O'Connor 87'	Stadium: Olympic Park; Attendance: 2,000; Referee: Evan Venios

18 April 1982 10	South Melbourne	0–1	Heidelberg United	Melbourne
		Report	Campbell 75'	Stadium: Middle Park Soccer Stadium; Attendance: 5,000; Referee: Stewart Mellings

25 April 1982 11	Heidelberg United	1–0	Sydney City	Melbourne
	Yzendoorn 77'	Report		Stadium: Olympic Village; Attendance: 3,500; Referee: Jack Johnston

2 May 1982 12	West Adelaide	4–0	Heidelberg United	Adelaide
	Honeyman 12', 48'; Boath 35'; Sumner 78'	Report		Stadium: Hindmarsh Stadium; Attendance: 3,760; Referee: Jim Rossis

9 May 1982 13	Heidelberg United	3–2	APIA Leichhardt	Melbourne
	Cole 32'; Rooney 49'; Paton 77'	Report	Giampaolo 48' (pen.); Bradley 80'	Stadium: Olympic Village; Attendance: 3,000; Referee: Chris Bambridge

16 May 1982 14	Brisbane City	2–2	Heidelberg United	Brisbane
	Glockner 5'; Conner ?' (pen.)	Report	Paton 73', 75'	Stadium: Spencer Park; Attendance: 2,000; Referee: Dave Nugent

23 May 1982 15	Heidelberg United	3–3	Footscray JUST	Melbourne
	Campbell 45', 67'; Yzendoorn 85'	Report	Belic 34'; Ristovski 51'; Ilioski 56' (pen.)	Stadium: Olympic Village; Attendance: 4,000; Referee: Evan Venios

30 May 1982 16	Newcastle KB United	2–2	Heidelberg United	Newcastle
	Mason 38'; Lowe 78'	Report	Cole 67'; Campbell 76'	Stadium: Newcastle International Sports Centre; Attendance: 3,452; Referee: Doug Rennie

6 June 1982 17	Heidelberg United	1–2	Canberra City	Melbourne
	Cole 61'	Report	Gibson 5', 68'	Stadium: Olympic Village; Attendance: 3,500; Referee: David Yelland

13 June 1982 18	Heidelberg United	3–1	St George-Budapest	Melbourne
	Cole 70'; Paton 77'; Bekiaris 84'	Report	Wilkinson 43'	Stadium: Olympic Village; Attendance: 2,800; Referee: Dennis Voutsinas

20 June 1982 19	Sydney Olympic	3–2	Heidelberg United	Sydney
	Gavin 68'; Koussas 74'; Jennings 86'	Report	Paton 7'; Campbell 44'	Stadium: Pratten Park; Attendance: 4,432; Referee: Richard Lorenc

27 June 1982 20	Heidelberg United	2–1	Marconi Fairfield	Melbourne
	Selemidis 16'; Paton 88'	Report	McMillan 17' (o.g.)	Stadium: Olympic Village; Attendance: 3,000; Referee: Chris Bambridge

4 July 1982 21	Brisbane Lions	1–0	Heidelberg United	Brisbane
	Sunderland 63'	Report		Stadium: Richlands Stadium; Attendance: 2,400; Referee: Alan Kibbler

11 July 1982 22	Heidelberg United	0–0	Preston Makedonia	Melbourne
		Report		Stadium: Olympic Village; Attendance: 6,000; Referee: Chris Bambridge

18 July 1982 23	Wollongong City	2–1	Heidelberg United	Wollongong
	O'Connor 39', 59'	Report	Paton 31'	Stadium: Wollongong Showground; Attendance: 4,200; Referee: Tim Davies

25 July 1982 24	Heidelberg United	2–0	South Melbourne	Melbourne
	J. Campbell 5'; Cole 19'	Report		Stadium: Olympic Village; Attendance: 6,000; Referee: David Yelland

1 August 1982 25	Sydney City	0–1	Heidelberg United	Sydney
		Report	Cole 59'	Stadium: ES Marks Athletics Field; Attendance: 1,635; Referee: Peter Rampley

8 August 1982 26	Heidelberg United	1–0	West Adelaide	Melbourne
	Campbell 81'	Report		Stadium: Olympic Village; Attendance: 3,000; Referee: David Yelland

15 August 1982 27	APIA Leichhardt	1–1	Heidelberg United	Sydney
	Jones 83'	Report	Paton 67'	Stadium: Lambert Park; Attendance: 2,380; Referee: Doug Rennie

22 August 1982 28	Heidelberg United	1–0	Brisbane City	Melbourne
	Paton 53'	Report		Stadium: Olympic Village; Attendance: 3,000; Referee: Stewart Mellings

29 August 1982 29	Footscray JUST	1–1	Heidelberg United	Melbourne
	Kondarios 75'	Report	Valentine 10'	Stadium: Schintler Reserve; Attendance: 3,000; Referee: Chris Bambridge

5 September 1982 30	Adelaide City	3–2	Heidelberg United	Adelaide
	J. Nyskohus 52' (pen.); Marocchi 84'; Villani 85'	Report	J. Nyskohus 1' (o.g.); MacLeod 2'	Stadium: Olympic Sports Field; Attendance: 1,982; Referee: Don Campbell

=== NSL Cup ===
14 June 1982 First round	South Melbourne	0–0 (a.e.t.) (4–5 p)	Heidelberg United	Melbourne
		Report		Stadium: Middle Park Soccer Stadium; Attendance: 6,000; Referee: Jim Fearn

14 July 1982 Quarter-finals	Heidelberg United	1–0	Preston Makedonia	Melbourne
	Valentine 75'	Report		Stadium: Olympic Park; Attendance: 1,000; Referee: Jim Fearn

11 August 1982 Semi-finals	Heidelberg United	3–1	Canberra City	Melbourne
	Taylor 12'; Valentine 14'; Cole 26' (pen.)	Report	Gibson 57'	Stadium: Olympic Park; Attendance: 1,000; Referee: Chris Bambridge

12 September 1982 Final	Heidelberg United	1–2	APIA Leichhardt	Melbourne
15:00 AEST	Campbell 63'	Report	McBreen 79'; Butler 85'	Stadium: Olympic Park; Attendance: 5,000; Referee: Don Campbell

== Statistics ==
=== Appearances and goals ===
Includes all competitions. Players with no appearances not included in the list.

No.	Pos	Nat	Player	Total		National Soccer League		NSL Cup	
No.	Pos	Nat	Player	Apps	Goals	Apps	Goals	Apps	Goals
1	GK	(Australia) AUS	Jeff Olver	34	0	30	0	4	0
2	DF	(Scotland) SCO	Arthur McMillan	34	0	30	0	4	0
3	DF	(Australia) AUS	Jim Tansey	22	0	17+1	0	4	0
4	DF	(Australia) AUS	John Yzendoorn	23	2	19+3	2	1	0
5	DF	(England) ENG	Don MacLeod	34	2	29+1	2	3+1	0
6	MF	(Australia) AUS	Jimmy Rooney	15	1	15	1	0	0
7	MF	(Australia) AUS	Theo Selemidis	32	2	28	2	4	0
8	MF	(Australia) AUS	Jim Campbell	34	13	30	12	4	1
9	FW	(Australia) AUS	Jamie Paton	33	8	27+2	8	4	0
10	DF	(Australia) AUS	Charlie Yankos	33	0	29	0	4	0
11	MF	(Australia) AUS	Andy Bozikas	6	0	6	0	0	0
14	DF	(Scotland) SCO	Bob Provan	2	0	0+2	0	0	0
15	MF	(Australia) AUS	Ken Taylor	25	1	18+5	0	2	1
16	FW	(Australia) AUS	Gary Cole	34	13	30	12	4	1
18	FW	(Australia) AUS	Tom Tasevski	2	0	1+1	0	0	0
	DF	(Australia) AUS	Claude Avian	2	0	0+2	0	0	0
		(Australia) AUS	Chris Bekiaris	12	1	9	1	2+1	0
	MF	(Australia) AUS	Mike Valentine	18	3	12+2	1	4	2

=== Disciplinary record ===
Includes all competitions. The list is sorted by squad number when total cards are equal. Players with no cards not included in the list.

No.	Pos	Nat	Player	Total			National Soccer League			NSL Cup		
No.	Pos	Nat	Player	Yellow card	Second yellow card	Red card	Yellow card	Second yellow card	Red card	Yellow card	Second yellow card	Red card
15	MF	(Australia) AUS	Ken Taylor	1	0	1	0	0	0	1	0	1
3	DF	(Australia) AUS	Jim Tansey	4	0	0	3	0	0	1	0	0
4	DF	(Australia) AUS	John Yzendoorn	3	0	0	3	0	0	0	0	0
9	FW	(Australia) AUS	Jamie Paton	3	0	0	3	0	0	0	0	0
1	GK	(Australia) AUS	Jeff Olver	2	0	0	1	0	0	1	0	0
5	DF	(England) ENG	Don MacLeod	2	0	0	2	0	0	0	0	0
8	MF	(Australia) AUS	Jim Campbell	2	0	0	2	0	0	0	0	0
16	FW	(Australia) AUS	Gary Cole	2	0	0	2	0	0	0	0	0
2	DF	(Scotland) SCO	Arthur McMillan	1	0	0	1	0	0	0	0	0
7	MF	(Australia) AUS	Theo Selemidis	1	0	0	1	0	0	0	0	0

- (yellow card) = Number of bookings; (second yellow card) = Number of sending offs after a second yellow card; (red card) = Number of sending offs by a direct red card.
