= 1978 Fitzroy United FC season =

Fitzroy United
1978 season
- Head Coach: Tony Boggi; John Margaritis
- Stadium: Middle Park; Schintler Reserve; Wentworth Park; Olympic Park
- National Soccer League: 5th
- NSL Cup: Quarter-finals
- Top goalscorer: League: Jim Campbell (12); All: Jim Campbell (14)
- Highest home attendance: 12,000 vs. Marconi Fairfield (4 June 1978); National Soccer League
- Lowest home attendance: 3,000 vs. Brisbane City (5 March 1978); National Soccer League; 3,000 vs. St George-Budapest (23 June 1978); National Soccer League
- Average home league attendance: 4,929
- Biggest win: 4–1 (twice); 3–0 (once); 6–3 (once)
- Biggest defeat: 0–4 vs. Marconi Fairfield (A) (12 March 1978); National Soccer League

The 1978 season was the second in the National Soccer League for Fitzroy United (now Heidelberg United Football Club). In addition to the domestic league, they also participated in the NSL Cup.

== Players ==
Note: Flags indicate national team as defined under FIFA eligibility rules; some limited exceptions apply. Players may hold more than one non-FIFA nationality.

No.	Pos.	Nation	Player
1	GK	AUS	Peter Blasby
2	DF	SCO	Arthur McMillan
3	DF	SCO	Bob Provan
6	DF	SCO	Pat Bannon (captain)
7	MF	AUS	Ken Taylor
8	MF	AUS	Jim Campbell
9	MF	AUS	Andy Bozikas
10	FW	AUS	Mike Micevski
11	FW	AUS	Branko Buljevic

No.	Pos.	Nation	Player
12	FW	SCO	Joe Tront
14	DF	AUS	Nick Rakovalis
15	MF	AUS	Theo Selemidis
16	FW	AUS	Gary Cole
18		AUS	Doug Hay
20	GK	AUS	Jim Marner
—	DF	SCO	Jim O'Reilly
—	DF	AUS	Jim Tansey
—	DF	AUS	Charlie Yankos

== Competitions ==
=== Overall record ===
Competition	First match	Last match	Starting round	Final position	Record							
Competition	First match	Last match	Starting round	Final position	Pld	W	D	L	GF	GA	GD	Win %
National Soccer League	5 March 1978	27 August 1978	Matchday 1	5th	26	9	8	9	39	39	+0	34.62
NSL Cup	17 May 1978	24 September 1978	First round	Quarter-finals	3	2	1	0	9	5	+4	66.67
Total					29	11	9	9	48	44	+4	37.93

Source: Competitions

=== National Soccer League ===
==== League table ====
Pos	Team	Pld	W	D	L	GF	GA	GD	Pts	Qualification
3	South Melbourne	26	12	8	6	45	30	+15	32	Qualification to Finals series (Note: The Finals series was not considered the championship for the 1978 National Soccer League.)
4	Marconi Fairfield	26	12	6	8	46	31	+15	30	Qualification to Finals series
5	Fitzroy United	26	9	8	9	39	39	0	26	
6	Brisbane Lions	26	8	10	8	37	39	−2	26	
7	St George-Budapest	26	11	3	12	41	40	+1	25	

Source: rsssf.com
Rules for classification: 1) Points; 2) Goal difference; 3) Goals scored

==== Results summary ====
Overall								Home						Away					
Pld	W	D	L	GF	GA	GD	Pts	W	D	L	GF	GA	GD	W	D	L	GF	GA	GD
26	9	8	9	39	39	0	35	6	3	4	19	14	+5	3	5	5	20	25	−5

Source: worldfootball.net

==== Results by round ====
Round	1	2	4	3	5	6	7	8	9	10	11	12	13	14	15	16	17	18	19	20	21	22	23	24	25	26
Ground	H	A	H	A	A	H	A	A	H	A	H	H	A	H	A	H	A	H	A	H	H	A	H	A	A	H
Result	W	L	L	L	D	D	D	L	W	D	D	W	W	W	D	D	W	W	L	L	L	W	W	D	L	L
Position	4	10	13	10	13	14	14	14	14	14	14	8	7	6	5	6	5	4	5	5	5	5	6	6	5	5
Points	2	2	2	2	3	4	5	5	7	8	9	11	13	15	16	17	19	21	21	21	21	23	25	26	26	26

Source: worldfootball.net
A = Away; H = Home; W = Win; D = Draw; L = Loss

==== Matches ====
Win Draw Loss

5 March 1978 1	Fitzroy United	1–0	Brisbane City	Melbourne
	Bozikas 79'	Report		Stadium: Middle Park Soccer Stadium; Attendance: 3,000; Referee: Stewart Mellings

12 March 1978 2	Marconi Fairfield	4–0	Fitzroy United	Sydney
	Vieri 15'; Rooney 40'; Jankovics 50'; Byrne 70'	Report		Stadium: Marconi Oval; Attendance: 5,891; Referee: Richard Lorenc

26 March 1978 4	Fitzroy United	0–3	Western Suburbs	Melbourne
		Report	Fisher 21'; C. Eaton 25', 47'	Stadium: Schintler Reserve; Attendance: 3,500; Referee: Tony Beazleigh

27 March 1978 3	Eastern Suburbs	2–1	Fitzroy United	Melbourne
	Mullen 57'; Stevenson 77' (pen.)	Report	Tront 79'	Stadium: Olympic Park; Attendance: 4,000; Referee: Dennis McDermott
Note: This match was moved to play at Olympic Park in Melbourne as Eastern Suburbs' home fixture.

2 April 1978 5	South Melbourne	1–1	Fitzroy United	Melbourne
	Kent 45'	Report	Cole 53'	Stadium: Middle Park Soccer Stadium; Attendance: 18,000; Referee: Nick Karlich

8 April 1978 6	Fitzroy United	1–1	West Adelaide	Melbourne
	Cole 73'	Report	Carruthers 90+1'	Stadium: Middle Park Soccer Stadium; Attendance: 3,500; Referee: David Yelland

15 April 1978 7	Canberra City	2–2	Fitzroy United	Canberra
	Byrne 54'; Grujicic 65' (pen.)	Report	Cole 60'; Taylor 85' (pen.)	Stadium: Bruce Stadium; Attendance: 5,300; Referee: Brian Fowler

23 April 1978 8	St George-Budapest	2–0	Fitzroy United	Sydney
	O'Connor 36' (pen.), 76' (pen.)	Report		Stadium: St George Stadium; Attendance: 2,160; Referee: Barry Wilkinson

30 April 1978 9	Fitzroy United	3–1	Sydney Olympic	Sydney
	Cole 8', 38'; Campbell 48'	Report	Ainslie 49'	Stadium: Wentworth Park; Attendance: 3,580; Referee: Doug Rennie
Note: This match was moved to play at Wentworth Park in Sydney as Fitzroy United's home fixture due to punishment by NSL for an assault on a referee.

6 May 1978 10	Newcastle KB United	2–2	Fitzroy United	Newcastle
	Boden 20'; Mason 83'	Report	Buljevic 65'; Campbell 70'	Stadium: Newcastle International Sports Centre; Attendance: 7,826

14 May 1978 11	Fitzroy United	0–0	Brisbane Lions	Melbourne
		Report		Stadium: Olympic Park; Attendance: 5,500; Referee: Bob Henderson

20 May 1978 12	Fitzroy United	3–0	Adelaide City	Melbourne
	Campbell 47', 50', 68'	Report		Stadium: Middle Park Soccer Stadium; Attendance: 4,000; Referee: Stewart Mellings

27 May 1978 13	Footscray JUST	1–2	Fitzroy United	Melbourne
	Palinkas 6'	Report	Cole 12', 65'	Stadium: Schintler Reserve; Attendance: 4,500

4 June 1978 14	Fitzroy United	4–1	Marconi Fairfield	Melbourne
	Buljevic 13'; Cole 27'; Campbell 44'; Bozikas 50'	Report	Richards 55'	Stadium: Olympic Park; Attendance: 12,000; Referee: Nick Karlich

11 June 1978 15	Brisbane City	1–1	Fitzroy United	Brisbane
	Caldwell 37' (pen.)	Report	Campbell 59'	Stadium: Perry Park; Attendance: 3,200; Referee: Dave Nugent

18 June 1978 16	Fitzroy United	1–1	Eastern Suburbs	Melbourne
	Tansey 35'	Report	E. Campbell 77'	Stadium: Olympic Park; Attendance: 3,500; Referee: Dennis McDermott

25 June 1978 17	Western Suburbs	2–3	Fitzroy United	Sydney
	Turnbull 63'; Eaton 79'	Report	Campbell 49'; Bozikas 55'; Buljevic 65'	Stadium: Wentworth Park; Attendance: 2,458; Referee: Henry Witschge

2 July 1978 18	Fitzroy United	4–1	South Melbourne	Melbourne
	Campbell 23'; Buljevic 57', 62'; McMillan 86'	Report	Rogers 6'	Stadium: Olympic Park; Attendance: 10,000

9 July 1978 19	West Adelaide	3–2	Fitzroy United	Adelaide
	Honeyman 52', 57'; Boyle 54'	Report	Campbell 51'; Taylor 68' (pen.)	Stadium: Hindmarsh Stadium; Attendance: 5,993; Referee: Graham Neal

16 July 1978 20	Fitzroy United	0–1	Canberra City	Melbourne
		Report	Marinello 85'	Stadium: Olympic Park; Attendance: 4,000; Referee: Nick Karlich

23 July 1978 21	Fitzroy United	1–4	St George-Budapest	Melbourne
	Cole 42'	Report	Grosse 12'; Terry 35'; Hensman 75'; Coates 90+1'	Stadium: Middle Park Soccer Stadium; Attendance: 3,000; Referee: Tony Beazleigh

30 July 1978 22	Sydney Olympic	1–3	Fitzroy United	Sydney
	McIntosh 62'	Report	Campbell 37'; Buljevic 72'; Cole 82'	Stadium: St George Stadium; Attendance: 3,676; Referee: Tony Boskovic

6 August 1978 23	Fitzroy United	1–0	Newcastle KB United	Melbourne
	Taylor 69' (pen.)	Report		Stadium: Olympic Park; Attendance: 4,500; Referee: Chris Bambridge

13 August 1979 24	Brisbane Lions	1–1	Fitzroy United	Brisbane
	Amos 57'	Report	Campbell 22'	Stadium: Perry Park; Attendance: 2,100; Referee: Jack Wood

20 August 1978 25	Adelaide City	3–2	Fitzroy United	Adelaide
	Muniz 21', 83'; Perin 58'	Report	Cole 70'; Bannon 89'	Stadium: Olympic Sports Field; Attendance: 3,223; Referee: Don Campbell

27 August 1978 26	Fitzroy United	0–1	Footscray JUST	Melbourne
		Report	Lujic 18'	Stadium: Olympic Park; Attendance: 4,000; Referee: Stewart Mellings

=== NSL Cup ===
Win Draw Loss

17 May 1978 First round	Fitzroy United	6–3	Prahran Slavia	Melbourne
	Bozikas 25', 44', 53'; Campbell 71', 79'; Cole 72'	Report	Miller 30'; Paton 67'; Train 90'	Stadium: Olympic Park; Attendance:

2 August 1978 Second round	Fitzroy United	2–1 (a.e.t.)	South Melbourne	Melbourne
	Buljevic 88'; Taylor 110'	Report	Cummigs 89'	Stadium: Olympic Park; Attendance: 8,000; Referee: Chris Bambridge

24 September 1978 Quarter-finals	Canberra City	1–1 (a.e.t.) (5–4 p)	Fitzroy United	Canberra
	Cant 45'	Report	Cole ?'	Stadium: Canberra Stadium; Attendance: 2,600; Referee: Peter Rampley

== Statistics ==
=== Appearances and goals ===
Includes all competitions. Players with no appearances not included in the list.

No.	Pos.	Nat.	Player	National Soccer League		NSL Cup		Total	
No.	Pos.	Nat.	Player	Apps	Goals	Apps	Goals	Apps	Goals
1	GK	(Australia)	Peter Blasby	19	0	1	0	20	0
2	DF	(Scotland)	Arthur McMillan	25	1	3	0	28	1
3	DF	(Scotland)	Bob Provan	24	0	3	0	27	0
6	DF	(Scotland)	Pat Bannon	25	1	1	0	26	1
7	MF	(Australia)	Ken Taylor	24+1	3	3	1	28	4
8	MF	(Australia)	Jim Campbell	25+1	12	3	2	29	14
9	MF	(Australia)	Andy Bozikas	19+4	3	2	3	25	6
10	FW	(Australia)	Mike Micevski	8+11	0	2+1	0	22	0
11	FW	(Australia)	Branko Buljevic	22	6	3	1	25	7
12	FW	(Scotland)	Joe Tront	2	1	0	0	2	1
14	DF	(Australia)	Nick Rakovalis	0+1	0	0+1	0	2	0
15	MF	(Australia)	Theo Selemidis	10+3	0	2+1	0	16	0
16	FW	(Australia)	Gary Cole	25	11	3	2	28	13
18	—	(Australia)	Doug Hay	2+1	0	0	0	3	0
20	GK	(Australia)	Jim Mariner	7	0	2	0	9	0
—	DF	(Scotland)	Jim O'Reilly	24+1	0	3	0	28	0
—	DF	(Australia)	Jim Tansey	25	1	3	0	28	1
—	DF	(Australia)	Charlie Yankos	0	0	0+1	0	1	0

=== Disciplinary record ===
Includes all competitions. The list is sorted by squad number when total cards are equal. Players with no cards not included in the list.

Rank	No.	Pos.	Nat.	Player	National Soccer League			NSL Cup			Total		
Rank	No.	Pos.	Nat.	Player	Yellow card	Second yellow card	Red card	Yellow card	Second yellow card	Red card	Yellow card	Second yellow card	Red card
1	3	DF	(Scotland)	Bob Provan	4	0	0	0	0	0	4	0	0
2	2	DF	(Scotland)	Arthur McMillan	3	0	0	0	0	0	3	0	0
2	6	DF	(Scotland)	Pat Bannon	3	0	0	0	0	0	3	0	0
2	7	MF	(Australia)	Ken Taylor	3	0	0	0	0	0	3	0	0
2	8	MF	(Australia)	Jim Campbell	3	0	0	0	0	0	3	0	0
6	—	DF	(Australia)	Jim Tansey	2	0	0	0	0	0	2	0	0
7	10	FW	(Australia)	Mike Micevski	1	0	0	0	0	0	1	0	0
7	11	FW	(Australia)	Branko Buljevic	1	0	0	0	0	0	1	0	0
7	15	MF	(Australia)	Theo Selemidis	1	0	0	0	0	0	1	0	0
7	18	—	(Australia)	Doug Hay	1	0	0	0	0	0	1	0	0
7	—	DF	(Scotland)	Jim O'Reilly	1	0	0	0	0	0	1	0	0
Total					21	0	0	2	0	0	23	0	0

=== Clean sheets ===
Includes all competitions. The list is sorted by squad number when total clean sheets are equal. Numbers in parentheses represent games where both goalkeepers participated and both kept a clean sheet; the number in parentheses is awarded to the goalkeeper who was substituted on, whilst a full clean sheet is awarded to the goalkeeper who was on the field at the start of play. Goalkeepers with no clean sheets not included in the list.

Rank	No.	Nat.	Goalkeeper	NSL	NSL Cup	Total
1	1	(Australia)	Peter Blasby	3	0	3
2	20	(Australia)	Jim Mariner	1	0	1
Total				4	0	4
