= The Meadows Greyhounds =

- The Meadows
- Interactive map of The Meadows Greyhounds
- Former names: Olympic Park Greyhound Racing (1962 - 1999)
- Address: 80 Northcorp Boulevard; Broadmeadows; Australia
- Location: Northcorp Boulevard, Broadmeadows, Victoria
- Coordinates: 37°40′55″S 144°57′07″E
- Owner: Melbourne Greyhound Racing Association
- Operator: Greyhound Racing Victoria (GRV)
- Surface: Sand
- Screens: Yes

Construction
- Opened: 8 February 1999
- Years active: 24

Website
- www.themeadows.org.au

The Meadows Greyhounds is one of two metropolitan Greyhound racing tracks located in the Australian state of Victoria. The track is positioned within an industrial estate in the north western Melbourne suburb of Broadmeadows. The Meadows is one of 13 greyhound tracks located in Victoria; it has races on Saturday nights (Metropolitan meetings) and Wednesday days (Provincial meetings).

== History ==
The Melbourne Greyhound Racing Club (MGRA) was founded in 1955. MGRA conducted its first races at the Maribyrnong track by leasing it for £100 per week. In 1957, MGRA was allowed to relocate to the North Melbourne Greyhound Oval. Racing was conducted with a tin hare. The first Australian Cup, held on the 31 March 1958, was won by champion greyhound, Rookie Rebel. Following a dispute over rent, the last race meeting held at the North Melbourne Track was on 16 April 1962. The MGRA then moved to the Olympic Park No.2, with the first meeting held on 20 August 1962. In 1994, the CityLink project resulted in the track being closed. The MGRA ended up receiving compensation to relocate the track to the Broadmeadows site. The first meeting held at The Meadows was on 8 February 1999.

== Track distances and specifications ==
The Meadows track is a circle track and has three distances over which the Greyhounds race - 525, 600, and 725 m. The track from post to post is 450 m.

=== Track records ===
Distance	Time	Greyhound	Trainer	Date
525m	29.376	Allen Deed	Andrea Dailly	3 January 2015
600m	33.911	Dyna Double One	Andrea Dailly	6 February 2016
725m	41.933	Space Star	Robert Britton	28 February 2015

=== Split records ===
Distance	Time	Greyhound	Trainer	Date
525m	4.89	Fernando Bale	Andrea Dailly	25 July 2015
600m	8.79	Lamia Bale	Steven Collins	21 February 2015
725m	4.84	Ima Misha Doll	Heather Collins	27 February 2016

== Feature races ==
The Meadows holds many feature races on its race calendar, including 9 group ones per year. The biggest event is the Australian Cup, which is worth AU$250,000 to the winner.
