= Australia Cup (disambiguation) =

The Australia Cup is the current Australian soccer national cup competition

Australia Cup may refer to:

- Australian Cup (greyhounds), an Australian greyhound racing competition
- Australian Cup, an Australian group 1 thoroughbred horse race
- Australia Cup (1962–1968), the former Australian soccer national cup competition ran in the 1960s
- Women's International Australia Cup, international women's association football cup tournament in Australia
