= Australian Cup (greyhounds) =

Australian greyhound racing competition

- Class: Group 1
- Location: The Meadows
- Inaugurated: 1958

Race information
- Distance: 525 metres
- Surface: Sand
- Purse: $300,000

The Australian Cup is a greyhound racing competition held annually at The Meadows in Broadmeadows, Victoria, Australia. The event was inaugurated in 1958 at North Melbourne Oval and is organised by the Melbourne Greyhound Racing Association (MGRA). The race moved with the MGRA and when the North Melbourne track closed it switched to Olympic Park but when Olympic Park closed it was held at Sandown Park for two years in 1997 and 1998, while the club established its new home at the Meadows.

The Cup is the highlight of the Australia Cup Carnival and it is worth $300,000 to the winner. The Australian Cup is one of the biggest races in Australia for greyhound racing. Australian Cup Finalists must win their heat and their semi-final in order to progress to the Australia Cup Final.

== Past winners ==
Year	Winner	Trainer	Venue	Distance	Time
1958	Rookie Rebel	Wally Hooper	(North Melbourne Oval)	675y	36 1/8
1959	Rocky Ros	J Trotman	(North Melbourne Oval)	675y	36 1/2
1960	Meadow Vale	Peter Reid	(North Melbourne Oval)	675y	36 1/2
1961	Copeland	Syd Barrett	(North Melbourne Oval)	675y	36 11/16
1962	Take A Bow	Peter Thompson	(North Melbourne Oval)	675y	36 7/16
1964	Old Tops	Frank McSweeney	(Olympic Park)	560y	30 15/16
1965	Worthing	A R Davey	(Olympic Park)	560y	29 15/16
1966	Billy Vee	Monty Tomblin	(Olympic Park)	560y	30 3/8
1967	Fawn Nulla	Lionel Price	(Olympic Park)	560y	30 1/8
1968	Swanston Lass	Ted Turner	(Olympic Park)	560y	30 1/4
1969	Benjamin John	Stan Cleverley	(Olympic Park)	560y	30 3/16
1970	The Smoother	N J Kay	(Olympic Park)	560y	30 3/8
1971	Black Diro	Tom Bleazby	(Olympic Park)	560y	30 1/2
1972	Blackamoor Lad	Colin Pavli	(Olympic Park)	560y	30 5/8
1973	Half Your Luck	Ted Redpath	(Olympic Park)	511m	30.32
1974	Kim's Monaro	Bob Doak	(Olympic Park)	511m	30.34
1975	Ungwilla Lad	Jim Coleman	(Olympic Park)	511m	30.75
1976	Odious	Jim Coleman	(Olympic Park)	511m	30.69
1977	Listowel Sue	Alan Fairlie	(Olympic Park)	511m	30.41
1978	Count D'Argent	Reg Johnston	(Olympic Park)	511m	30.19
1979	Boundless	J Lew-Fatt	(Olympic Park)	511m	30.51
1980	Tangaloa	Joe Hili	(Olympic Park)	511m	30.12
1981	Pete's Advice	R McDonald	(Olympic Park)	511m	30.30
1982	Royal Rumpus	Mrs J Thomas	(Olympic Park)	511m	30.08
1983	Drop Of Wine	John Hellingman	(Olympic Park)	511m	30.23
1984	Tangairn	David Fitzgerald	(Olympic Park)	511m	30.22
1985	Eaglehawk Star	Joan Gilchrist	(Olympic Park)	511m	29.93
1986	Bright Judge	Cesare Costa	(Olympic Park)	511m	30.37
1987	Regal Post	William Salter	(Olympic Park)	511m	29.91
1988	Golden Blessing	Raymond Rounds	(Olympic Park)	511m	29.59
1989	Ginger	Salvatore Condo	(Olympic Park)	511m	30.00
1990	Spread Eagled	Joseph Pearl	(Olympic Park)	511m	29.88
1991	Franklin Deano	George Bryant	(Olympic Park)	511m	29.74
1992	China Trip	Gary Ball	(Olympic Park)	511m	29.96
1993	China Trip	Gary Ball	(Olympic Park)	511m	29.71
1994	Mancunian Girl	Peter Wardle	(Olympic Park)	511m	29.58
1995	Bonjase	Desmond Moodie	(Olympic Park)	511m	30.02
1996	Tenthill Doll	Harry Sarkis	(Olympic Park)	515m	29.74
1997	Smooth Rumble	Stephen Kavanagh	(Sandown Park)	515m	30.00
1998	Fibba	Stanley Ralph	(Sandown Park)	515m	30.39
1999	Mandatario	Graeme Jolly	(The Meadows)	518m	30.23
2000	Arvo's Express	Tina Womann	(The Meadows)	518m	29.92
2001	Brett Lee	Darren McDonald	(The Meadows)	518m	29.49
2002	Isa Brown	Robert Britton	(The Meadows)	525m	30.33
2003	Blackjack Tom	Graeme Bate	(The Meadows)	525m	30.16
2004	Bogie Leigh	Tony Brett	(The Meadows)	525m	29.92
2005	Pure Octane	Darren McDonald	(The Meadows)	525m	29.70
2006	Miss Spicy	Troy Murray	(The Meadows)	525m	30.11
2007	Pete's Conquest	Peter Giles	(The Meadows)	525m	29.77
2008	Tasman Queen	Robert Britton	(The Meadows)	525m	29.97
2009	Velocette	Graeme Bate	(The Meadows)	525m	29.77
2010	Dyna Lachlan	Andrea Dailly	(The Meadows)	525m	29.84
2011	ST Pierre	Debbie Cannan	(The Meadows)	525m	29.90
2012	Zara Zulu	Rosalyn Hume	(The Meadows)	525m	30.14
2013	Spud Regis	Andrea Dailly	(The Meadows)	525m	29.63
2014	Buckle Up Wes	Edward Medhurst	(The Meadows)	525m	29.74
2015	Luca Neveelk	Gerald Kleeven	(The Meadows)	525m	29.96
2016	Dyna Double One	Andrea Dailly	(The Meadows)	525m	29.75
2017	Fanta Bale	Robert Britton	(The Meadows)	525m	30.01
2018	Hecton Bale	Andrea Dailly	(The Meadows)	525m	29.53
2019	Dyna Patty	Andrea Dailly	(The Meadows)	525m	29.58
2020	Fernando's Riot	Anthony Azzopardi	(The Meadows)	525m	29.72
2021	Tommy Shelby	Steve Withers	(The Meadows)	525m	29.86
2022	Lala Kiwi	Andrea Dailly	(The Meadows)	525m	29.63
2023	Fernando Mick	David Geall	(The Meadows)	525m	29.85
2024	Tim Zoo	Jason Thompson	(The Meadows)	525m	29.71

== Notes ==
- not held in 1963
