= Polyplatano, Florina =

Polyplatano Πολυπλάτανο
- Community
- Location within Greece
- Coordinates: 40°52′40″N 21°24′25″E
- Country: Greece
- Geographic region: Macedonia
- Administrative region: Western Macedonia
- Regional unit: Florina
- Municipality: Florina
- Municipal unit: Kato Kleines

Population (2021)
  - Community: 207
- Time zone: UTC+2 (EET)
  - Summer (DST): UTC+3 (EEST)

Polyplatano (Greek: Πολυπλάτανο, before 1926: Κλαμπουσίστα – Klampousista) is a village in Florina Regional Unit, Macedonia, Greece.

The 1920 Greek census recorded 628 people in the village, and 45 inhabitants (11 families) were Muslim in 1923. Following the Greek–Turkish population exchange, Greek refugee families in Klampousista were from Pontus (29) in 1926. The 1928 Greek census recorded 742 village inhabitants. In 1928, the refugee families numbered 29 (128 people).

Polyplatano had 428 inhabitants in 1981. In fieldwork done by anthropologist Riki Van Boeschoten in late 1993, Polyplatano was populated by Slavophones and a Greek population descended from Anatolian Greek refugees who arrived during the population exchange. The Macedonian language was used by people of all ages, both in public and private settings, and as the main language for interpersonal relationships. Some elderly villagers had little knowledge of Greek. Pontic Greek was spoken by people over 60, mainly in private.
