= Mike Micevski =

Australian soccer player (born 1954)

Michael Micevski (born 9 October 1954) is an Australian former soccer player of Macedonian descent that played as a forward.

== Club career ==
During the 1970s Micevski played for Altona Gate and Melbourne Hakoah before moving to Sydney to play for Marconi. In 1976, he had a brief stint with Arminia Bielefeld.

== International career ==
Micevski made one appearance for Australia in 1975 against China.
