= Yakka Banovic =

Australian soccer player

Yakka Banović
Personal information
- Full name: Vjekoslav Banović
- Date of birth: 12 November 1956 (age 69)
- Place of birth: Bihać, FPR Yugoslavia
- Position: Goalkeeper

Senior career*
Years	Team	Apps	(Gls)
1972-1976	Adelaide Croatia		
1977	Toronto Metros		
1978	Melbourne Croatia	14	(0)
1979	Heidelberg United	6	(0)
1980–1984	Derby County	35	(0)
1984	Melbourne Croatia	9	(0)
1985–1986	Brunswick Juventus	41	(0)
1989	Heidelberg United	6	(0)

International career
1980	Australia	2	(0)
1985	Australia B	2	(0)
- * Club domestic league appearances and goals

Vjekoslav "Yakka" Banović (born 12 November 1956) is a former Association footballer who played two matches for the Australia national soccer team. He is of Croatian descent.
