= John Yzendoorn =

Australian soccer player (born 1955)

Personal information
- Date of birth: 17 September 1955 (age 71)
- Place of birth: Leeds, England
- Height: 5 ft 7 in (1.70 m)
- Position: Defender

Senior career*
Years	Team	Apps	(Gls)
1972–1974	Preston North End	0	(0)
1976	Morecambe		
1978	Prahran Slavia		
1979–1982	Heidelberg United	92	(11)
1983–1985	South Melbourne	64	(5)
1986–1988	Brunswick Juventus	60	(7)
1989	Sandringham City		
1993	Croydon City	17	(0)

International career
1980–1981	Australia	13	(1)
- * Club domestic league appearances and goals

John Yzendoorn (born 17 September 1955) is a former professional soccer player who played for Heidelberg United, South Melbourne and Brunswick Juventus in the National Soccer League. Born in England, he represented Australia at international level.

== Club career ==
Yzendoorn started his career in his native England with Preston North End but was released in 1974 without making a first-team appearance. He then moved into non-league football and played for nearby Morecambe. Yzendoorn later moved to Australia and was signed by Heidelberg United in 1979, playing four seasons with the Melbourne-based club in the National Soccer League. He joined fierce rivals South Melbourne in 1983, and helped them to their first national championship in 1984. After three years with South Melbourne, he moved to Brunswick Juventus in 1986, where he spent the final three seasons of his national domestic career.

In 2009, he became one of the initial inductees into the South Melbourne Hall of Fame.

== International career ==
Yzendoorn made his international debut at the age of 23, when he was selected by Rudi Gutendorf to play in a two-match series against Partizan Belgrade in 1979, where he came on as a substitute in both matches. His first 'A' international cap came against Czechoslovakia in 1980, where he again appeared off the bench in the Socceroos 2–2 draw at Olympic Park in Melbourne. He scored his first and only international goal in another 2–2 draw against Mexico in Sydney later that year.

He became an Australian citizen in 1981 in order to play in Australia's 1982 FIFA World Cup qualifying matches.

In all, Yzendoorn would play 13 'A' international matches for his country, his career ending during Australia's ill-fated 1982 World Cup qualifying campaign, where he was a key member of the squad which lost at home to New Zealand.

== Honours ==
Heidelberg United

- NSL Championship runner-up: 1980
- NSL Cup runner-up: 1980, 1982

South Melbourne

- NSL Championship: 1984

Brunswick Juventus

- NSL Cup runner-up: 1988
