= Theo Selemidis =

Australian soccer player

Personal information
- Date of birth: 27 October 1959 (age 67)
- Place of birth: Polyplatano, Florina, Greece
- Position: Midfielder

Senior career*
Years	Team	Apps	(Gls)
1979–1987	Heidelberg United	256	(22)
1989	Melbourne Croatia	22	(1)

International career
1980	Australia	7	(1)
1984	Australia B	3	(0)
- * Club domestic league appearances and goals

Theo Selemidis (born 27 October 1959) is an Australian former soccer player who played at both professional and international levels as a midfielder.

== Career ==
Selemidis played at club level for Heidelberg United and Melbourne Croatia.

He also earned seven caps for Australia in 1980. Selemidis scored his only international goal in a 3–3 tie against Greece on 11 November 1980.
