= Jeff Olver =

Australian soccer player (born 1960)

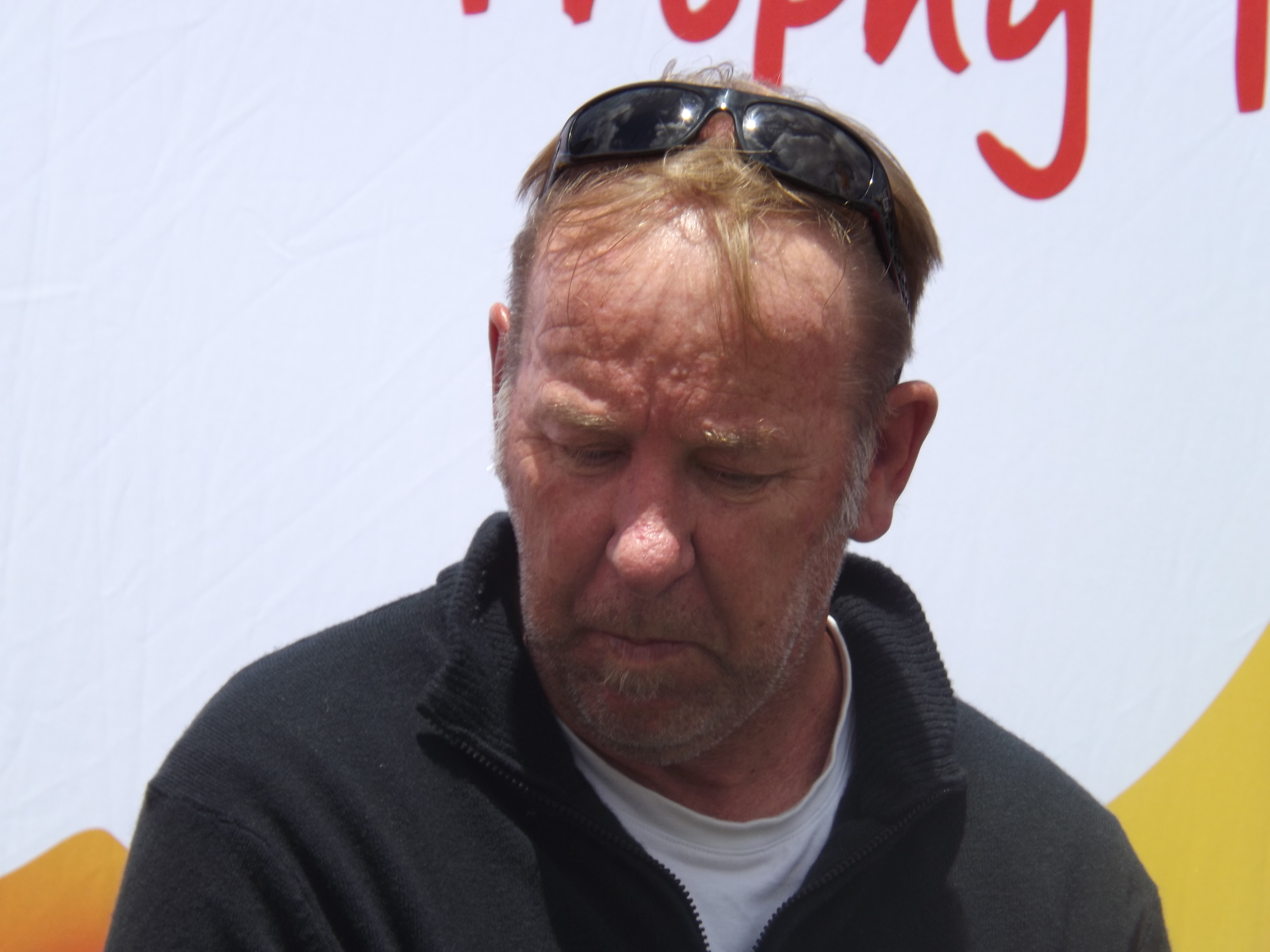
- Olver in 2014

Personal information
- Full name: Jeffrey Olver
- Date of birth: 25 December 1960 (age 65)
- Height: 5 ft 11 in (1.80 m)
- Position: Goalkeeper

Youth career
- Albion Rovers

Senior career*
Years	Team	Apps	(Gls)
1980–1987	Heidelberg		
1988–1989	Melbourne Croatia		
1990–1992	Heidelberg		
1994–1996	Bulleen Lions		

International career
1984	Australia B	2	(0)
1985–1989	Australia	37	(0)
1989	Australia (futsal)	3	(0)

Managerial career
- 1995: Bulleen Lions
- 1997–1999: Carlton (youth)
- 2000: Heidelberg
- 2003: Thomastown Devils
- * Club domestic league appearances and goals

Jeffrey Olver (born 25 December 1960) is an Australian former football (soccer) player. Olver is a member of the Football Federation Australia - Football Hall of Fame.

== Playing career ==
=== Club career ===
Olver played for Heidelberg and Melbourne Croatia in the Australian National Soccer League.

=== International career ===
Olver played 37 times for Australia. He was part of the Australian team that made the Quarter Final of the 1988 Olympic Football Tournament.

He played for Australia in the 1989 FIFA Futsal World Championship finals.

Olver is often regarded as one of the greatest goalkeepers Australia has ever produced

== Coaching career ==
In 1995 Olver coached Bulleen Lions in the Victorian Premier League. He later coached Carlton's youth team in the National Soccer League National Youth League. In 2000, he rejoined Heidelberg.
