= Jimmy Rooney =

Footballer (born 1945)

Jimmy Rooney OAM
Personal information
- Full name: James Rooney
- Date of birth: 10 December 1945 (age 80)
- Place of birth: Dundee, Scotland
- Position: Left winger

Senior career*
Years	Team	Apps	(Gls)
1964–1965	Lochee Harp		
1965–1967	Peterborough United	7	(2)
1967–1968	Montrose	13	(1)
1968–1969	Essendon Lions		
1970–1971	Prague		
1972–1976	APIA Leichhardt		
1977–1978	Marconi	52	(11)
1979–1981	Heidelberg United	93	(5)

International career
1970–1980	Australia	57	(20)
- * Club domestic league appearances and goals

James Rooney (born 10 December 1945) is a former professional footballer who played as a left winger. Born in Scotland, he played for the Australia national team at international level and was member of the squad at the 1974 FIFA World Cup.

== Biography ==
Rooney played first-team football with Lochee Harp, Peterborough United and Montrose F.C. in the United Kingdom, before emigrating to Melbourne, Australia in the late 1960s. He was an instant success there with Ukrainian Essendon Lions before transferring to Sydney to join the Prague club in 1970, and later playing at APIA Leichhardt, in the New South Wales First Division. In 1977, with APIA not joining the newly formed National Soccer League, Rooney joined Marconi Fairfield for two seasons, before moving back to Victoria where he played with Fitzroy Alexander and Croydon City Arrows.

Rooney made his Australian debut against an England XI in 1971, going on play 57 times for his country (although he also accrued caps in "B" team fixtures, bringing the total to 102) in a career spanning a decade. He was Australia's first-choice midfielder in the 1974 FIFA World Cup campaign, earning himself many admirers for his hard tackling and ball distribution. The Jimmy Rooney Medal, awarded from 1992 onwards to the man of the match in the Victorian Premier League Grand Final, was named in his honour.

Rooney has recently settled to a managerial role of the Victorian senior team, Eastern Lions, and also hosts a junior training program. He was also the head coach of the first eleven soccer team at St Kevin's College, Melbourne, Australia. In his second season in charge in 2009, he delivered the APS soccer premiership to the school, ending a nine-year drought.

In 2018, Rooney was signed as Manager of the St. Kevin's Old Boys Soccer Club.

Rale Rasic gave his first Australian cap versus the touring British club in 1971 and also he turned into a fixture at the national side contributing up to this World Cup in 1974, playing midfield alongside a second Scot, Jimmy Mackay. The set has been that the engine part of this Socceroos, mixing substantial work-rates with incisive distribution and also the skill to alter a match using an act of brilliance as it had been wanted.

Jimmy Rooney was a portion of this Socceroos team that qualified for its World Cup for the first time in 1974 and performed all three games from West Germany. He had been restricted to 102 instances by Australia (57 A internationals) and then captained both sides in a few situations. He also scored some memorable goals from the gold and green, for example, a contrary to Santos of both Brazil along with the powerful Pele. Jimmy Rooney Performed at the National Soccer League year for Marconi and then for Fitzroy United Alexander. He chose to play with club level and also place an advanced training academy in Springvale using Gus McLeod, mixing this with turning outside to Hamlyn Rangers who played in Geelong City.

Jimmy Rooney was deeply engaged with the match, training and instruction in Eastern Lions, the combined outdated Scotch-Waverley team at Victoria's State League Division 2, together with a longtime close friend, Jimmy Williams, accomplishing promotion in 2012.

Rooney received the Medal of the Order of Australia in June 2025.
