= Gary Cole (soccer) =

Australian soccer player (born 1956)

Personal information
- Date of birth: 5 February 1956 (age 70)
- Place of birth: London, England
- Position: Striker

Senior career*
Years	Team	Apps	(Gls)
1972–1975	Ringwood Wilhelmina	?	(?)
1976–1983	Heidelberg Alexander	177	(88)
1984–1986	Preston Lions FC	69	(21)

International career^{‡}
1978–1982	Australia	19	(17)
1984	Australia B	5	(0)

Managerial career
- 1996–1997: Altona Magic
- 1997–1998: Bulleen Zebras
- 2000–2001: Bentleigh Greens
- 2003: Altona Magic
- 2003: Victoria
- * Club domestic league appearances and goals as of 30 March 2007 ‡ National team caps and goals as of 30 March 2007

Gary Cole (born 5 February 1956) is an Australian soccer player, who played for the Australia national football team 40 times and scored 20 goals between 1975 and 1984. He was most recently the Football director for A-League club Sydney FC, made redundant in December 2012.

== Playing career ==
Transferred from Ringwood Wilhelmina to Fitzroy Alexander (later called Heidelberg United) in 1976 for a transfer fee of 6,000 after three years at Ringwood. Cole became one of the early stars of the National Soccer League as a striker, scoring 88 goals in six seasons at Heidelberg. In 1984, Cole moved to rival NSL club Preston Lions FC after injuring his ankle badly in 1983, and went on to score 21 goals for the club before retiring in 1986.

On 14 August 1981, he scored seven goals against Fiji, and set an Australian record for the most goals scored in an international match. His record was broken in 2001, when Archie Thompson scored 13 goals against American Samoa.

== Coaching career ==
Cole has coached at various Victorian Premier League clubs and coached the Victorian state representative team after previously working on a full-time basis at the AIS in Canberra.

Cole was Melbourne Victory FC's first director of football, commencing this role from its inaugural season in 2005 until mid 2011.

== Honours ==
- Australian national football team 1979-1982 19 caps and 17 goals.
- Victorian Representative Honours (Playing) 1974 - 1975
- Victorian Representative Honours (Coaching) 2003

== International goals ==
No.	Date	Venue	Opponent	Score	Result	Competition
1.	11 June 1978	Melbourne, Australia	Greece	1–?	1–2	Friendly
2.	27 November 1979	Taipei, Taiwan	Taiwan	2–0	2–0	Friendly
3.	31 May 1980	Sydney, Australia	England	1–2	1–2	Friendly
4.	26 August 1980	Melbourne, Australia	Mexico	1–0	1–1	Friendly
5.	11 November 1980	Athens, Greece	Greece	1–0	3–3	Friendly
6.	2 December 1980	Be'er Sheva, Israel	Israel	1–0	1–0	Friendly
7.	26 July 1981	Suva, Fiji	Fiji	1–0	4–1	1982 FIFA World Cup qualification
8.	26 July 1981	Suva, Fiji	Fiji	4–0	4–1	1982 FIFA World Cup qualification
9.	14 August 1981	Melbourne, Australia	Fiji	2–0	10–0	1982 FIFA World Cup qualification
10.	14 August 1981	Melbourne, Australia	Fiji	?–0	10–0	1982 FIFA World Cup qualification
11.	14 August 1981	Melbourne, Australia	Fiji	5–0	10–0	1982 FIFA World Cup qualification
12.	14 August 1981	Melbourne, Australia	Fiji	6–0	10–0	1982 FIFA World Cup qualification
13.	14 August 1981	Melbourne, Australia	Fiji	7–0	10–0	1982 FIFA World Cup qualification
14.	14 August 1981	Melbourne, Australia	Fiji	8–0	10–0	1982 FIFA World Cup qualification
15.	14 August 1981	Melbourne, Australia	Fiji	9–0	10–0	1982 FIFA World Cup qualification
16.	6 October 1982	Kallang, Singapore	Thailand	3–0	4–0	1982 Merlion Cup
17.	14 October 1982	Kallang, Singapore	Malaysia	5–0	5–0	1982 Merlion Cup
