= Jim Tansey =

Australian soccer player

Personal information
- Date of birth: 8 August 1953 (age 73)
- Place of birth: Liverpool, England
- Position: Full-back

Senior career*
Years	Team	Apps	(Gls)
- South Liverpool
1974–1976	Slavia Melbourne	40	(6)
1977–1983	Heidelberg United	146	(5)
1984	Footscray JUST	26	(0)

International career
1975–1981	Australia	19	(0)
- * Club domestic league appearances and goals

Jim Tansey (born 8 August 1953) is an Australian former soccer player who played as a full-back.

== Personal life ==
The son of Everton footballer Jimmy Tansey, Tansey was born in Liverpool, England in 1953. He emigrated to Australia in 1974. He is also the uncle of 2015 Scottish Cup winner, Greg Tansey.

== Club career ==
Tansey began his senior playing career for South Liverpool F.C. After moving to Australia, he played for Slavia Melbourne in the Victorian State League. With the start of the National Soccer League (NSL), Tansey moved to Fitzroy United Alexander. He later played for NSL club Footscray JUST.

== International career ==
Between 1975 and 1981, Tansey played 19 full international matches for the Australia national team.

== Honours ==
Heidelberg United

- 1980 Grand Final

Individual

- Argus Medal: 1976
- FFA Football Hall of Fame - Medal of Excellence: 2010
