= Eastern Sportsground =

Multi-purpose stadium in Melbourne, Victoria

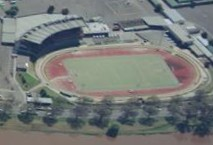
- Eastern Sportsground in October 1992
- Interactive map of Eastern Sportsground
- Location: Olympic Boulevard, Melbourne
- Coordinates: 37°49′34″S 144°59′00″E
- Capacity: 6,000

Construction
- Opened: 1956
- Closed: 1996
- Demolished: 2001

Tenants
- Victorian Amateur Football Association (VAFA) 1956-1961; Melbourne Greyhound Racing Association (MGRA) 1962-1996

Eastern Sportsground (also known as Olympic Park No. 2) was a multi-purpose stadium located on Olympic Boulevard in inner Melbourne. The stadium was built as a field hockey venue for the 1956 Olympics. It was primarily used for greyhound racing and was the home of the Melbourne Greyhound Racing Association (MGRA) from 1962 until 1996. The first tenants were the Victorian Amateur Football Association from 1956 until 1961 and Olympic Park No.2 was formerly part of the Melbourne Sports and Entertainment Precinct.

The ground was demolished in 2001, and much of the site was replaced by Edwin Flack Field (a training ground for Collingwood Football Club). Edwin Flack Field was then replaced by the Melbourne Rectangular Stadium which opened in 2010. Today the southern half of the Melbourne Rectangular Stadium sits in what would have been Olympic Park No.2.

== History ==
In 1861 the area was made into the Melbourne Zoological Gardens but only lasted one year before moving because it was deemed to be too swampy. It was then used for athletic carnivals and social events before a 1909 proclamation that the area was to be used for recreation. The Amateur Sportsground as it became known consisted of two ovals; one of these ovals became the Motordrome from 1924-1951 and the other was more basic. The site was re-named Olympic Park in 1933 despite the fact that there was no plans for an Olympic Games until 20 years later. With the advent of the 1956 Olympic Games the area was converted into the Olympic Park Stadium, the Eastern Sportsground (or Olympic Park No.2) and Velodrome. The latter two roughly on the site of the demolished Motordrome.

The new Eastern Sportsground construction consisted of a small grandstand surrounded by a hill. After being used as the venue for Field hockey at the 1956 Summer Olympics it became the home of the Victorian Amateur Football Association (VAFA) and the field was used for Australian rules football at the cost of £350 a year for the ground. The following year the VAFA also agreed a deal with the Olympic Park Management that would allow its main match to be played on the Olympic Park Oval on a weekly basis.

The Melbourne Greyhound Racing Association (MGRA) were looking for a new home because they refused to pay the council an increase in annual rent from £7,000 to £9,500 at the North Melbourne Oval, consequently during the early part of 1962 they agreed a deal with the Olympic Park Management. The agreement was installing facilities at the cost of £50,000 in addition to an annual rent of £5,000 (or 12.5 percent of gate receipts). The first meeting took place on 20 August 1962 with the first winner being the Les Foran trained Rebel Cub. The construction of the greyhound track resulted in the exit of the VAFA because the greyhound track reduced the dimensions of the field below the minimum requirement for Australian Rules football.

Over the following decade the racing (which was conducted mainly on Monday nights) was a success and in 1973 the MGRA built a new two-tier grandstand costing $5.5 million. The grandstand could seat 2200 people and was named after Harold Matthews (the MGRA Chairman) at the time. Further improvements to the stadium were completed during 1985 and included a synthetic pitch to host soccer and rugby and an athletics track and throwing area. Greyhound racing was held over distances of 560 and 800 yards on a sand surface (later 298, 511, 600 and 732 metres). The track hosted the Australian Cup from 1964 until 1995.

Towards the end of 1994 the MGRC were asked to move temporarily because of a issues surrounding the planned Burnley Tunnel. This led to the need for the tunnel entrance to be located within the stadium field which would spell the end for the stadium. The final race meeting was held on 26 February 1996.

The tunnel opened in 2000 and the stadium was demolished in 2001. The site was turned into part of the Edwin Flack Field before the southern section of the 30,000 capacity Melbourne Rectangular Stadium or AAMI Park was constructed over the site of the former stadium.
