= Jamie Paton =

Australian soccer player

Personal information
- Full name: James Stewart Paton
- Date of birth: 26 April 1955 (age 71)
- Place of birth: Glasgow, Scotland
- Position: Striker

Youth career
- Queen's Park

Senior career*
Years	Team	Apps	(Gls)
1974–1978	Queen's Park	101	(18)
1978	Prahran Slavia	22	(18)
1978–1984	Heidelberg Alexander	92	(42)
1984–1985	Footscray JUST	39	(28)

International career
1979–1980	Australia	8	(0)
- * Club domestic league appearances and goals

Jamie Paton is an Australian former international soccer player.

== Career ==
He began his career with Queens Park in Scotland, performances led to a battle for his signature between Aston Villa & Celtic but not before the likes of Manchester United and Leeds United had courted him.

Jamie had agreed in principle to join Aston Villa after a Scottish Cup match against Celtic, but after sustaining a knee injury in this game Villa decided against a move.

Soon after Jamie was on a plane to Australia and joined Prahran Slavia in the Victorian State League in 1978. He very quickly marked his arrival leading the Goal scoring for the competition that year with 18 goals. At the end of 1978 Heidelberg United a powerhouse at the time in the National Soccer League signed Jamie for $25,000. Again the transfer fee was repaid in goals, with Jamie joining in round 10 of the 1979 season he scored 5 goals from his first 5 games at NSL level and won the club goal scoring award with 11 that season which saw Heidelberg finish in second place to Sydney City.

His Strike Partnership with Gary Cole was nothing less than prolific bringing 77 goals in a season and a half between 1979 & 1980 and being described as one of the best strike pairing's Australia has seen. Jamie was runner up to Gary Cole in the NSL Scoring charts in 1979 & 1980 with 16 and 18 goals respectively. This Partnership along with a star-studded lineup which included 9 of the 11 Socceroos at the time helped Heidelberg to a second-place finish in the 1980 National Soccer League season, and a win in the 1980 NSL Grand Final in which Heidelberg defeated Sydney City 4–0 in Canberra, Jamie scoring 1 and Gary Cole with a hat trick. Socceroo Honours were to follow in late 1980, joining the Socceroos on their now infamous 1980 world tour. After a disagreement with then Socceroos coach Rudi Gutendorf he was never selected for the National Team again.

He continued to score goals at a prolific rate in the NSL and in 92 games with Heidelberg United he scored 42 goals. Many of these against Heidelberg United's biggest rival South Melbourne.

1984 saw a change at the Olympic Village and after a bitter dispute one which not see him return to the club for over 20 years, Jamie was given a free transfer to Footscray J.U.S.T and with Heidelberg struggling to score goals that season Jamie once again proved his worth netting 16 times in his first season with the club.

After ankle injuries towards the end of season 84, Jamie had an interrupted 1985 still managing to score goals and help J.U.S.T to their highest ever finish in the NSL.

After losing his passion for the game, Jamie was talked into joining Brunswick Juventus for the 1986 NSL season. After only playing 2 NSL Cup games Jamie announced his retirement at the age of only 29. Losing all interest in the game never to pull on the boots again.

He is now involved at board level with Heidelberg United in the Victorian Premier League after returning to the club in 2003.
