= Greyhound Group Racing in Australia =

Australia puts on many group races all year. Here is a list of greyhound group racing in Australia.

== Group 1,2 and 3 races ==
Click on the sort symbol at the top of the columns to sort on a particular field.

Race Name	Group	Distance	Track	1st Prizemoney
AJS Corporation Silver Chief	1	525	The Meadows Greyhounds	100000
Paws of Thunder	1	520	Wentworth Park	75000
National Futurity	1	520	Wentworth Park	75000
National Derby	1	520	Wentworth Park	75000
Zoomtop	1	725	The Meadows Greyhounds	75000
Rookie Rebel	1	600	The Meadows Greyhounds	75000
Temlee	1	525	The Meadows Greyhounds	100000
Australian Cup	1	525	The Meadows Greyhounds	250000
Australian Stayers Final	1	725	The Meadows Greyhounds	100000
The Ladbrokes Golden Easter Egg	1	520	Wentworth Park	250000
Association Cup	1	720	Wentworth Park	75000
Sky Racing Galaxy	1	715	Cannington Greyhounds	100000
Sky Racing Perth Cup	1	520	Cannington Greyhounds	150000
Harrison-Dawson	1	515	Sandown Greyhounds	100000
Sapphire Crown	1	515	Sandown Greyhounds	100000
RSN927 Sandown Cup	1	715	Sandown Greyhounds	175000
UBET Gold Cup	1	710	Albion Park Greyhounds	75250
Ladbrokes Peter Mosman	1	520	Wentworth Park	75000
Garrard's Winter Cup	1	520	Albion Park Greyhounds	75250
Hudson Pacific Maturnity Classic	1	525	The Meadows Greyhounds	100000
UBET AGRA National Distance Final	1	731	Angle Park Greyhounds	75000
UBET AGRA National Sprint Final	1	515	Angle Park Greyhounds	75000
Crownbet Megastar	1	520	Dapto Greyhounds	75000
UBET Adelaide Cup Final	1	515	Angle Park Greyhounds	75000
Sky Racing Topgun	1	525	The Meadows Greyhounds	150000
Ladbrokes Vic Peters Classic Final	1	520	Wentworth Park	75000
Hume Cup	1	600	The Meadows Greyhounds	75000
Bold Trease	1	715	Sandown Greyhounds	100000
TAB Melbourne Cup	1	515	Sandown Greyhounds	420000
Sky Racing Brisbane Cup	1	520	Albion Park Greyhounds	75250
Luxbet Hobart Thousand	1	461	Hobart Greyhounds	75000
TRFM Sale Cup	1	650	Sale Greyhounds	75000
Woy Woy Poultry Supplies Gosford Gold Cup	2	515	Gosford Greyhounds	40000
Cranbourne Cup	2	520	Cranbourne Greyhounds	47000
Summer Plate	2	720	Wentworth Park	40000
Endeavour Locksmiths Warragul Cup	2	460	Warragul Greyhounds	47000
CKH Painting Shepparton Gold Cup Final	2	450	Shepparton Greyhounds	47000
Curtains and Blinds Launceston Cup	2	515	Launceston Greyhounds	40000
Ladbrokes-Cyril Rowe Bulli Gold Cup	2	472	Bulli Greyhounds	40000
Vince Curry Memorial Maiden	2	520	Ipswich Greyhounds	30937.50
Richmond Oaks	2	535	Richmond Greyhounds	40000
Richmond Derby	2	535	Richmond Greyhounds	40000
Launching Pad	2	515	Sandown Greyhounds	150000
PPK Mining Gold Cup	2	450	Maitland Greyhounds	45000
Rosewood and District Community Bank Auction Series	2	520	Ipswich Greyhounds	40000
Bogie Leigh Queensland Futurity	2	520	Albion Park Greyhounds	47250
Glen Gallon @ Stud Queensland Derby	2	520	Albion Park Greyhounds	47250
Maceys Bistro Warrnambool Classic	2	450	Warrnambool Greyhounds	75000
Warrnambool Cup	2	450	Warrnambool Greyhounds	47000
WA Derby	2	520	Cannington Greyhounds	40000
WA Oaks	2	520	Cannington Greyhounds	40000
Horsham Cup	2	480	Horsham Greyhounds	47000
Topcat Video Productions Traralgon Cup	2	525	Traralgon Cup	47000
3BO 93.5 FM Bendigo Cup	2	425	Bendigo Greyhounds	47000
McKenna Memorial	2	595	Sandown Greyhounds	40000
The BlackTop	2	515	Newcastle Greyhounds	40000
Cranbourne Classic	2	520	Cranbourne Greyhounds	25000
Bob Payne Spring Sprint Final	2	520	Wentworth Park	40000
All 4 Paws & Claws Pet Resort Healesville Cup	2	350	Healesville Greyhounds	47000
Great Chase	2	525	The Meadows Greyhounds	47000
Sky Racing Topgun Stayers	2	725	The Meadows Greyhounds	75000
Lismore Workers Club Cup	2	520	Lismore Greyhounds	40000
Geelong Cup	2	460	Geelong Greyhounds	47000
All Stars Sprint	2	520	Cannington Greyhounds	40000
Shootout	2	515	Sandown Greyhounds	50000
Energis Ballarat Cup	2	450	Ballarat Greyhounds	77000
Laurels	2	515	Sandown Greyhounds	50000
Birthday Cup	3	405	Mandurah Greyhounds	25000
Dowling MCarthy Hankook Tyres Devonport Cup	3	452	Devonport Greyhounds	25000
Queensland Cup	3	600	Albion Park Greyhounds	25550
GRV Vic Bred Maiden Final	3	525	The Meadows Greyhounds	25000
The New Sensation	3	520	Wentworth Park	25000
The Ambrosoli	3	520	Wentworth Park	25000
Ladbrokes Magic Maiden	3	520	Wentworth Park	25000
Gold Cup	3	720	Wentworth Park	25000
ClassicBet Nowra Summer Puppy Classic	3	520	Nowra Greyhounds	25000
Sky Racing Perth Cup Consolation	3	520	Cannington Greyhounds	25000
The Racecallers	3	595	Sandown Greyhounds	25000
Lizrene	3	715	Sandown Greyhounds	25000
Bill Collins Speed Star	3	515	Sandown Greyhounds	25000
Evans and Son Ladies Bracelet	3	520	Wentworth Park	25000
Howard Ashton Final	3	515	Angle Park Greyhounds	26000
Chief Ministers Group 3 Darwin Cup	3	537	Winnelie Park Greyhounds	25000
Angliss Meats Townsville Cup	3	498	Townsville Greyhounds	25200
Crownbet Maiden	3	520	Dapto Greyhounds	25000
Coffex Coffee SA Oaks Final	3	515	Angle Park Greyhounds	25000
Chairman's Cup Final	3	720	Wentworth Park	25000
TAB.COM.AU Canberra Cup	3	530	Canberra Greyhounds	25000
BGC Industrial Cleaning Supplies SA Derby	3	515	Angle Park Greyhounds	25000
Charcoal Inn Casino Cup	3	484	Casino Greyhounds	25000
Top Cat Video Cup	3	725	The Meadows Greyhounds	25000
Ladbrokes Sydney Cup Final	3	720	Wentworth Park	25000
Nowra Spring Puppy Classic	3	520	Nowra Greyhounds	25000
Clint's Caravan Warehouse Gold Coast Cup	3	520	Albion Park Greyhounds	25200
Mandurah Cup	3	490	Mandurah Greyhounds	25000
Gawler Gold Cup	3	531	Gawler Greyhounds	26000
RSN 927 Silver Bullet	3	525	The Meadows Greyhounds	25000
Young Stars Classic	3	520	Cannington Greyhounds	25000
City of Ipswich Gold Cup	3	520	Ipswich Greyhounds	31500
Brian Johnstone Final	3	515	Angle Park Greyhounds	26000
Dapto/Crownbet Puppy Classic Final	3	520	Dapto Greyhounds	75000
Sir John Dillon Memorial	3	595	Sandown Greyhounds	25000
Ladbrokes Summer Cup	3	720	Wentworth Park	25000
Christmas Gift Final	3	520	Wentworth Park	25000
