= Ballarat Greyhounds =

Morshead Park
- Interactive map of Morshead Park
- Location: Morshead Park, Sutton Street and Rubicon Street, Ballarat Central Victoria
- Coordinates: 37°34′47″S 143°49′49″E
- Operator: Ballarat Greyhound Racing Club
- Surface: Burrumbeet Sand

Construction
- Opened: 23 December 1978

The Ballarat Greyhounds, also known as Morshead Park, is a greyhound racing track located at Morshead Park, Sutton Street and Rubicon Street, Ballarat Central Victoria, Australia. Managed by the Ballarat Greyhound Racing Club (BGRC) and overseen by Greyhound Racing Victoria (GRV). This track hosts events like the Ballarat Cup and offers races covering distances of 390, 450, 545 and 660 metres. Racing is conducted Monday and Wednesday and occasional Saturdays and includes Tabcorp betting facilities and video replays broadcast on and off course.

== History ==
The Ballarat Greyhound Racing Club was formed in 1935 and the original track was located at Broadway Park (the North Ballarat Sports Club today) in Creswick Road, adjoining the Ballarat Showgrounds. The track was opened on 11 March 1938 by councillor H J Wheeler.

Over a three-year period during the late 1970s a new racing complex was constructed at the present site at Morshead Park. The opening meeting was held on Saturday 23 December 1978 with the first race winner being Eddy Tornado trained by W R Dalton. The meeting included a match race (a two-runner race only, where two greyhounds are matched against each other) between Melbourne Cup winner Tangaloa and Sandown Park track record holder Darville's Flyer, won by the latter.

In 2012, Morshead Park underwent a significant facility upgrade costing $3.2 million. The upgrade was split between GRV ($1.7 million), the Coalition Government ($1.35 million) and the BGRC ($150,000) and included a major transformation of the grandstand and race track. The first meeting after the upgrade was held on Wednesday 3 October 2012.

== Track distances ==
Distance (m)	Distance (ft)
390	1,280
450	1,480
545	1,788
660	2,170

== Ballarat Cup Roll of Honour ==
The Cup was first held in 1960 at Broadway Park over 496 yards. In 2020 the winner received $47,000 although prizes have been higher in the past.

=== Past winners ===
Year	Winner
1960	Rebby Boy
1961	Dalemee
1962	Eerie Town
1963	Alrarniv
1964	
1965	
1966	
1967	
1968	Baytown's Son
1969	My Gina
1970	
1971	Fawn Metal
1972	Master Caleb
1973	She's My Girl
1974	Fawn Capri
1975	Ben Boro
1976	Ernie Diro
1977	not held
1978	not held
1979	Nelson's Mate
1980	Swift As Light
1981	Johnny's Monaro
1982	Satan's Shroud
1983	Total Claim
1984	Lady Lilly
1985	Trisun
1986	not held
1987	Shining Chariot
1988	Kepler
1989	Hay Dinney
1990	Welcome Stranger
1991	Malawi's Prince
1992	Wild Pirate
1993	Dallas Duo
1994	Tivoli Man
1995	Malawi Law
1996	King Of Talent
1997	Young Darren
1998	Lansley Bale
1999	Tom's Legacy
2000	Puff Daddy
2001	Carlisle Jack
2002	Knockabout Wok
2003	Puzzle Prize
2004	Whisky Assassin
2005	Magic Trance
2006	Witch Magic
2007	Go Wild Jack
2008	Vee Man Vane
2009	Dyna Lachlan
2010	Greta Bale
2011	Up and Away
2012	Maverick Tiger
2013	Ronin Izmir
2014	Luca Neveelk
2015	Shared Equity
2016	Zambora Brockie
2017	Aston Dee Bee
2018	Aston Kimetto
2019	Western Envoy
2020	Yozo Bale
2021	Ferdinand Boy
2022	Compliance
2023	Kelsey Bale
2024	Explicit
