= Greyhound racing in Australia =

Australian greyhound racing sport and industry

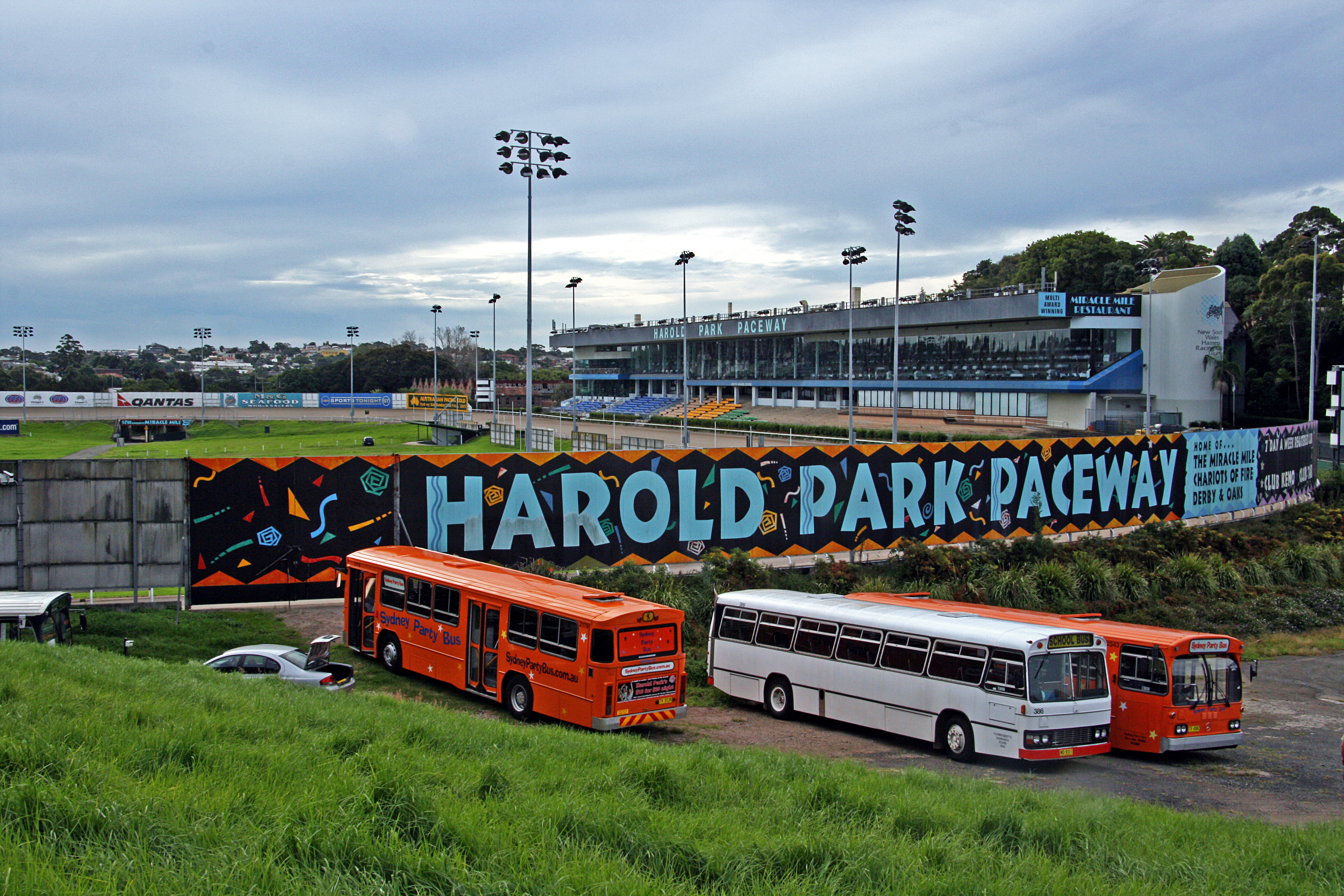
- Harold Park Paceway
- Start date: 28 May 1927; Epping Racecourse (later known as Harold Park)

Greyhound racing in Australia is a sport and gambling activity. Australia is one of several countries with a greyhound racing industry. The industry laws are governed by the State Government but the keeping of greyhounds is governed by the Local Authority.

== History ==
In 1927 Frederick 'Judge' Swindell established the Greyhound Coursing Association and the first meeting was held using a "tin hare" (mechanical lure) at Epping Racecourse (Harold Park) on 28 May 1927. From 1928 until 1931 betting was banned. Harold Park continued to be the only venue to have a licence until July 1938 when the government granted a second licence (consisting of 26 fixtures) for Wentworth Park. Although the licence was granted in July 1938 it was not until Saturday 28 October 1939 that the new track opened. The opening had been delayed due to the construction of the track taking longer than expected.

In 1939 the NSW Greyhound Breeders, Owners and Trainers Association was founded. In 1979, live hare coursing and other similar activities, including live baiting, was banned in NSW under the Prevention of Cruelty to Animals Act and in 1985 Wentworth Park became the racing headquarters of NSW.

=== 2015 live baiting scandal ===
In February 2015, the industry came under severe scrutiny following the airing of the ABC program Four Corners. A series of media reports detailed the use of live bait animals in the training of racing greyhounds. In June 2016, former High Court Justice Michael McHugh conducted a Special Commission of Inquiry in New South Wales, where key findings of the report included a high death rate with uncompetitive greyhounds being euthanised over a twelve year period and the under-reporting of greyhound deaths and injuries. Despite self-regulatory efforts to address the issue of live baiting and other animal welfare issues, the revelations led to suspensions, inquiries, condemnation of the practice and the banning of greyhound racing in New South Wales and the Australian Capital Territory from 1 July 2017, following the passage of legislation. However the ban was repealed by Mike Baird on 11 October 2016. The appointment of the NSW Greyhound Reform Panel made 122 recommendations to the NSW government, of which 121 were adopted. Victoria commissioned the Perna Report, while Queensland commissioned the MacSporran report. As part of the NSW government recommendations, it created GWIC (Greyhound Welfare and Integrity Commission), which is a taxpayer funded, non-industry regulator of the greyhound racing industry.

== Regulation ==
Greyhound racing in Australia is regulated at the state and territory level. Each jurisdiction establishes a statutory controlling authority responsible for licensing, rule-making, integrity oversight and animal welfare standards under its respective racing legislation.

Although regulatory responsibility is decentralised, the rules of racing are largely harmonised nationally. The Australian Greyhound Racing Rules are maintained by Greyhounds Australasia, the peak body representing the state and territory controlling authorities, and are adopted by each jurisdiction as part of its regulatory framework.

State and territory authorities exercise enforcement powers through stewards and integrity officials, including the conduct of inquiries, disciplinary proceedings and the imposition of penalties for breaches of the rules or relevant legislation.

== By jurisdiction ==
=== Australian Capital Territory ===
There is currently no racing in the ACT following a territory ban in 2018. The Canberra Greyhound Racing Club (CGRC) is still active using their Symonston track as a training facility but the club races at Goulburn in New South Wales.

=== New South Wales ===
In 2009, the government formed a new legislation, known as the Greyhound Racing Act 2009 which made provisions in regards to the control and regulation of the industry and the Greyhound Racing NSW (GRNSW) then became responsible for the regulatory affairs of the sport in addition to the commercial aspects.

The NSW Greyhound Welfare Code of Practice came into effect on 1 January 2021, with 58 code practice standards (out of 124 in total) relating to retired greyhounds. The code is the benchmark for expected conduct and behaviour and has an Enforcement Protocol.

In 2022, Lismore was forced to close following flooding and an inability to rebuild the track to meet GRNSW's minimum standards.

==== Venues ====
The following venues are active greyhound racing tracks in NSW.

Name of club/track	Location	Opened	Meeting Type
Broken Hill Greyhound Racing Club	Lane/Noonan Street, Broken Hill	28 March 1949 (new track 1971)	Non-TAB
Bulli Greyhounds	Bulli Showground, Grevillea Park Road, Bulli	4 November 1950	TAB meetings
Casino Greyhound Racing Club	Queen Elizabeth Park, Hartley Street, Casino	19 March 1936(new track 2015)	TAB meetings
Coonabarabran Greyhound Racing Club	Chappell Avenue, Coonabarabran	c.1970	Non-TAB
Coonamble Greyhound Club	Showgrounds, 160-180 Castlereagh Street, Coonamble	1933?	Non-TAB
Cowra Greyhound Club	West Cowra Recreation Ground, Young Road, Cowra	–	Non-TAB
Dapto (South Coast Greyhounds)	Greyhound Racing NSW, 89 Princes Highway, Dapto	25 February 1937	TAB meetings
Dubbo Greyhound Racing Club	Dawson Park, Wheelers Lane, Dubbo	23 March 1974	TAB meetings
Gosford Showground	Showground Road, Gosford	8 February 1936	TAB meetings
Goulburn Greyhound Racing Club	49 Braidwood Road, Goulburn	20 October 1934	TAB meetings
Grafton Greyhound Racing Club	70 Cranworth Street, Grafton	1 April 1933	TAB meetings
Gunnedah Greyhounds	Talibah/Finch Street, Gunnedah	24 March 1934	TAB meetings
Kempsey MacLeay Greyhound Racing Club	Raceway, East Street, off Angus McNeil Cres, Kempsey	–	Non-TAB
Lithgow Greyhound Racing Club	1 Union Street, Lithgow	14 April 1928	Non-TAB
Maitland Greyhounds	Maitland Showground, Blomfield Street, Maitland	12 November 1927	TAB meetings
Muswellbrook Greyhound Racing Club	Greyhound Park, Sydney Street, Muswellbrook	17 December 1955	Non-TAB
Nowra (Shoalhaven Greyhound Racing Club)	Shoalhaven Racing Complex, Albatross Road, Nowra	30 January 1976	TAB meetings
Potts Park Greyhound Social Club	140 Rookwood Road, Yagoona	c.1970	Non-TAB
Richmond Race Club	312 Londonderry Road, Richmond	October 1955	TAB meetings
Tamworth Greyhound Racing Club	1 Gunnedah Road, Tamworth	19 May 1934	Non-TAB
Taree Greyhound Racing Club	Kanangra Drive, Taree	1960s	TAB meetings
Temora Greyhound Racing Club	Gallipoli Street, Temora	1957	TAB meetings
The Gardens Greyhound Club	104 Sandgate Road, Birmingham Gardens	2014	TAB meetings
Wagga & District Greyhound Club	Urana Street, Wagga Wagga	c.1970s	TAB meetings
Wauchoupe (Hasting Rivers Greyhound Club)	Beechwood Road, Wauchope	3 July 1971	Non-TAB
Wentworth Park	Wentworth Park Road, Ultimo	28 October 1939	TAB meetings
Young & District Greyhound Racing Club	Alfred Oval, Lachlan Street, Young	21 November 1953	Non-TAB

=== Northern Territory ===
Greyhound racing in the Northern Territory (NT) is regulated by Licensing NT on behalf of the NT Racing Commission.

The NT has one active greyhound racing venue, known as Winnellie Park. The track is operated by the Darwin Greyhound Association (DGA), which is the Territory’s only greyhound racing club. Most racing greyhounds in the NT are trained and kennelled directly at the Winnellie Park racetrack, within view of DGA staff and other residing trainers.

=== Queensland ===
Greyhound racing in Queensland is administered by Racing Queensland, the statutory control body for the code in the state. Racing Queensland is responsible for the management, development and promotion of greyhound racing, including the licensing of clubs and venues and the making of rules of racing. Integrity and animal welfare oversight are carried out independently by the Queensland Racing Integrity Commission.

==== Venues ====
The following venues are active greyhound racing tracks in Queensland.

Name of club/track	Location	Opened
Albion Park Raceway (Brisbane Greyhound Racing Club)	Amy Street, Albion	11 February 1993
Bundaberg Greyhound Racing Club	Thabeban Park, Maynard Street, Avenell Heights, Bundaberg	October 1977
Capalaba Straight	Old Cleveland Road, Capalaba	1987
Ipswich Greyhound Racing Club	Ipswich Showgrounds, Warwick Road, Ipswich	1973
Rockhampton Greyhound Racing Club	Callaghan Park, Renney Street, Rockhampton	May 1982
The Q Greyhound Centre	Ipswich	April 2024
Townsville Showground (Townsville Greyhound Racing Club)	Ingham Road, West End, Townsville	19 December 1936

=== South Australia ===
Greyhound racing in South Australia is conducted under the control of Greyhound Racing South Australia (GRSA), the industry body responsible for the administration, operation and promotion of the sport. South Australia does not have a separate statutory integrity commission.

==== Venues ====
There are four active tracks in South Australia.

Name of club/track	Location	Opened
Angle Park (Adelaide Greyhound Racing Club)	Cardigan Street, Angle Park	20 April 1972
Gawler Greyhound Racing Club	Showgrounds, Nixon Terrace, Gawler	12 July 1971
Murray Bridge Greyhound Racing Club	2 Kennett Road, Murray Bridge East	19 December 2018
Tara Raceway (Mount Gambier Greyhounds)	161 Lake Terrace East, Mount Gambier	25 January 1997

=== Tasmania ===
Tasracing, established in November 2008, is responsible for the strategic direction and funding of the industry. On 1 February 2025, the Office of Racing Integrity (ORI) was dissolved and replaced by a split-regulatory model under the Racing Regulation and Integrity Act 2024. Integrity oversight is now managed by the independent Tasmanian Racing Integrity Commissioner, while operational integrity is handled by the Tasracing Integrity Unit.

Following the 2025 Tasmanian state election, Premier Jeremy Rockliff announced in August 2025 the phase out of all greyhound racing in the state by 30 June 2029.

==== Venues ====
The following venues are active greyhound racing tracks in Tasmania.

Name of club/track	Location	Opened
Devonport Showground (North West Greyhound Racing Club)	Gunn and Parker Street, Devonport	3 April 1952
Elwick Racecourse (Hobart Greyhound Racing Club)	Goodwood Road, Glenorchy	2 November 2006
Mowbray Racecourse (Launceston Greyhound Racing Club)	Jellico Street, Mowbray, Launceston	20 December 2004

=== Victoria ===
Greyhound racing in Victoria is regulated and administered by Greyhound Racing Victoria (GRV). GRV is responsible for licensing, rule enforcement, integrity functions and animal welfare administration under Victoria’s racing framework.

==== Venues ====
The following venues are active greyhound racing tracks in Victoria.

Name of club/track	Location	Opened
Ballarat Greyhounds	Morshead Park, Sutton Street, Ballarat Central	23 December 1978
Bendigo Greyhound Racing Association	Lords Raceway, McIvor Highway, Junortoun, Bendigo	1978
Cranbourne Greyhound Racing Club	Cranbourne Racing Centre, Grant Street, Cranbourne	August 1973
Geelong Greyhound Racing Club	The Beckley Centre, Broderick Road, Corio, Geelong	7 March 1980
Healesville Greyhound Racing Club	Showgrounds & Sporting Complex, Don Road, Healesville	November 1989
Horsham Greyhound Racing Club	Horsham Showground, Henty Highway, Horsham	17 December 1973
Sale Greyhound Club	Showgrounds, Maffra-Sale Road, Sale	6 Feb 1936 (new tracks 1963 & 1982)
Sandown Park	Lightwood Road, Springvale	8 September 1956
Shepparton Greyhound Racing Club	7580 Goulburn Valley Highway, Kialla	10 December 2005
The Meadows Greyhounds	Northcorp Boulevard, Broadmeadows	8 February 1999
Traralgon Greyhound Racing Club	Glenview Park, McNairn Road, Traralgon	28 June 1973
Warragul Greyhound Club	Logan Park, Howitt Street, Warragul	14 September 1956
Warrnambool Greyhound Racing Club	Wannon Park, Koroit Street, Warrnambool	27 July 1978

== Former venues ==
The following venues are former greyhound racing tracks in Victoria.

Name of club/track	Location	Operated
Botanic Park	Botanic & Queens Road, Warrnambool	1936–1978
Broadway Park	Creswick Road, Wendouree	1938–1978?
Canterbury Park	Simpsons Road, Eaglehawk	1936–1978
Corio Oval	Limeburners Road, East Geelong	1956–1970s
North Melbourne Oval	Arden Street, North Melbourne	1957–1962
Olympic Park No. 2	Olympic Boulevard, Melbourne	1962–1996
Robinvale Greyhound Racing Club	Latje Road, Robinvale	
Shepparton Showgrounds	High Street, Shepparton	1973–2005
Wangaratta Greyhound Racing Club	Avian Park Raceway, Wangaratta	2002–2009

=== Western Australia ===
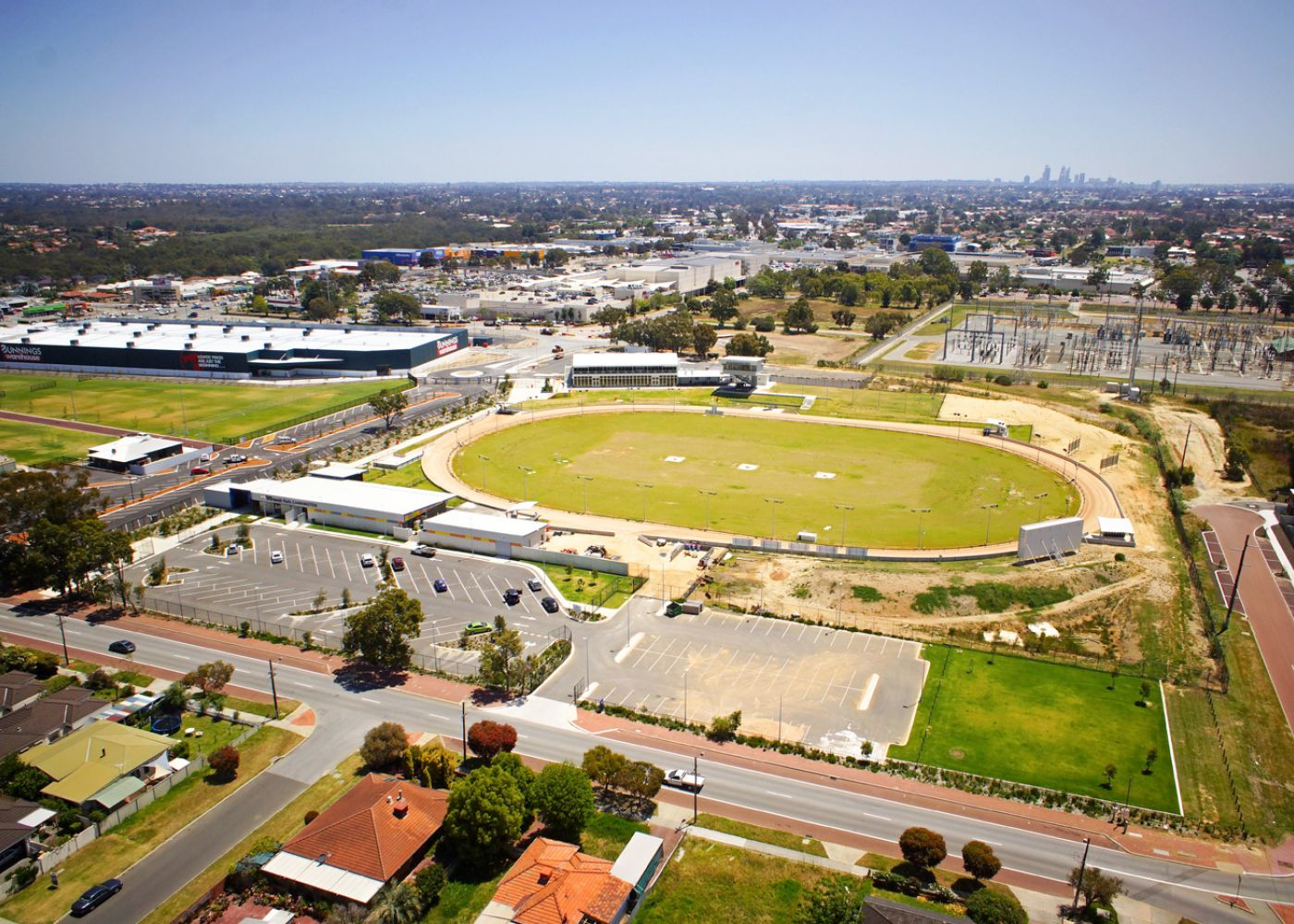
Cannington Greyhounds

In 1981, the Western Australian Greyhound Racing Association (WAGRA) was established under the Western Australian Greyhound Racing Association Act. Cannington Greyhounds was the first track in Western Australia, opening in 1974 and was consequently transferred to the WAGRA. This was later followed by the merger of the Mandurah Greyhound Racing Association.

==== Venues ====
The following venues are active greyhound racing tracks in Western Australia.

Name of club/track	Location	Opened
Cannington Greyhounds (WAGRA)	Station and Grey Street, Cannington	opened 23 March 2016
Mandurah Greyhounds (WAGRA)	Kanyana Park, Gordon Road, Mandurah	opened 5 January 1979, (new track Nov 2006)
Northam Greyhounds (WAGRA)	Burwood Park, Clarke Street, Northam	opened 30 September 1996

==== = Former venue ====
The following venues are former greyhound racing tracks in Western Australia.

Name of club/track	Location	Operated
Cannington Central (WAGRA)	Showgrounds, Station Street, off Albany Highway, Cannington	1974–2015

== Major races ==
Major races in Australian greyhound racing are typically those classified as Group 1 events, the highest tier of competition within the sport's grading system, which represents the pinnacle of greyhound racing in the country. Notable races include the Phoenix, the Million Dollar Chase, and the Melbourne Cup.

== Adoption ==
Many adoption programs have been set up throughout Australia. There are industry programs and non-industry rescue groups (which are usually charities). Greyhounds are available for adoption in most parts of Australia. The industry's Greyhound Adoption Program (GAP) operates in most states but does not re-home all ex-racing greyhounds. In 2018, The New Daily newspaper reported 257 greyhounds (38%) failed the NSW rehoming test.

Some states and territories require muzzling of greyhounds. Both RSPCA Australia and the Australian Veterinary Association (AVA) recommend against muzzles for companion animal greyhounds. NSW, Victoria and the ACT have removed the requirement to muzzle greyhounds in public. In NSW, the Greenhounds program assesses greyhounds for exemption from mandatory muzzling in designated off-leash dog areas, reporting pass rates of more than 90%.

== Criticism ==
In 2013, ABC News revealed that some greyhounds were given to veterinary surgeons as blood donors before being euthanised. In 2015, following revelations of animal cruelty and concerns about dog wastage in the greyhound racing industry, the Australian Veterinary Association called for all greyhounds bred for racing to be registered with an "independent authority to protect the dogs' welfare". In 2016, 179 trainers were charged with illegal exports to Macau, China, a practice that was banned in 2013. This led to Qantas announcing they would no longer transport ex-racers.

== Popular culture ==
In Australian slang, the term Dapto dog is rhyming slang for wog, a pejorative for a person of Mediterranean background, active in greyhound racing in Dapto in the 1950s as represented on stage by the Griffin Theatre Company with the 2015 production of Dapto Chaser. Dapto was also once home to Australia's largest greyhound pup auctions in Australia.

Notable Australian owners of racing greyhounds include Tony Lockett, Tim Cahill, and Ricky Ponting.
