= Geelong Cup (greyhounds) =

- Class: Group 2
- Location: The Beckley Centre
- Inaugurated: 1962

Race information
- Distance: 520 metres
- Surface: Sand
- Purse: $75,000

The Geelong Cup is held annually at The Beckley Centre and is organised by the Geelong Greyhound Racing Club. It is the highlight of greyhound racing year in Geelong and is one of Greyhound Racing Victoria's Country Cups, and is run over 520 metres.As of 2023 The cup is worth $75,000 to the winner. The Cup was first held in 1962.

== Past winners ==
Year	Winner	Trainer	Time (Sec)
1962	Darkie Bobs		
1963	Mardec		
1964	Silver Cadet		
1965	Amasta		
1966	Billy Vee		
1967	Haydale		
1968	he Apprentice		
1969	Miram Miss		
1970	Phantom's Heir		
1971	High Volant		
1972	Ranee's Magic		
1973	The Little Gent		
1974	Ty Court		
1975	Zero Ranger		
1976	Tivashley		
1977	Smart Roman		
1978	Not held		
1979	Rustic Star		
1980	Tempix		
1981	Worthy Weston		
1982	Satan's Shroud		
1983	Diamond Tempix		
1984	Pomona's Tigress		
1985	Dublin Flyer		
1986	Thorgil Magic		
1987	Modern Gossip		
1988	Benito's Boy		
1989	Fair Sentence		
1990	Ravello		
1991	Honourly		
1992	Golden Ridge		
1993	Golden Currency		
1994	Tantallon		
1995	Painted Wish	Allan Britton	25.92
1996	Sobbing Sal	Ted Sallows	26.11
1997	Power Zone	Edward Watt	25.37
1998	Cerin Bale	Graeme Bate	25.50
1999	Pete's Boss	Peter Giles	25.52
2000	Suellen Bale	Graeme Bate	25.34
2001	Modern Assassin	Mary Mugavin-Brown	25.50
2002	Bear Creek	Allan Britton	25.32
2003	Puzzle Prize	Peter Giles	25.36
2004	Whisky Assassin	Jason Thompson	25.23
2005	Brilliant Lee	Len Poore	25.57
2006	Dyna Checa	Graeme Bate	25.49
2007	Cool Effort	Darren McDonald	25.34
2008	Birthday Boy	Stephen Elsum	25.39
2009	Gripen Bale	Brendan Wheeler	25.45
2010	No Race		
2011	Dyna Tron	Andrea Dailly	25.61
2012	Hurunui Hitman	Stephan Mckenna	25.58
2013	Black Magic Opal	Jason Thompson	25.10
2014	Luca Neveelk	Gerald Kleeven	25.41
2015	Dalgetty	Jason Thompson	25.60
2016	Shima Song	Andrea Dailly	25.39
2017	Thirty Talks	Tony Brett	25.37
2018	Aston Kimetto	Seona Thompson	25.44
2019	Hooked On Scotch	Jason Thompson	25.30
2020	Simon Told Helen	David Burnett	29.98
2021	Weblec Jet	Jeffrey Britton	29.53
2022	Yozo Bale	Correy Grenfell	29.69
2023	Kelsey Bale	Daniel Gibbons	29.61

Distances

- 1962-2009 (457 metres)
- 2010-2019 (460 metres)
- 2020-present (520 metres)
