= Fernando Bale =

Australian racing greyhound (2013–2025)

- Breed: Greyhound
- Sire: Kelsos Fusileer
- Dam: Derry Linda
- Sex: Dog
- Whelped: 12 March 2013
- Died: November 2025 (aged 12)
- Country: Australia
- Color: White & dark brindle
- Owner: Paul & Janice Wheeler
- Trainer: Andrea Dailly

Honours
- Golden Easter Egg champion 8 Group 1 races

Fernando Bale (12 March 2013 – November 2025) was an Australian racing Greyhound. He earned a world-record $1.3 million in prize money.

Fernando Bale was mostly white in colour with most of his body and legs white, but he also had a brindle rump and face (except a white stripe in the middle of his face). His official colour was white and dark brindle.

On 21 November 2025, it was announced that Fernando Bale had died at the age of 12.

== Career ==
His first victory was the 525 m maiden special weight at The Meadows. After two further wins, he won his first of seven G1 races in the National Derby at Wentworth Park. After the Ballarat Derby, Fernando won the G1 Golden Easter Egg. His last two G1 wins were in the Adelaide Cup at Angle Park and the Top Gun at The Meadows.

He raced in the Melbourne Cup Final but placed second by a small margin. He then won the G2 Ballarat final and a free-for-all before he became too injured to race and was put out to stud. As of June 2022, he had sired 165 Group and Listed winners.

== Pedigree ==
Wigwam Wag
Gable Dodge
CJ Ima Bahama
Kelsos Fusileer
Arrigle Buddy
Lassinagh Silky
Last Boher
Fernando Bale
Black Shiraz
Primo Uno
FPrima Portrait
Chloe Allen
Awesome Assassin
Rosemary Bale
Kobie Bale
