= Darren Pattinson =

English cricketer (born 1979)

Personal information
- Full name: Darren John Pattinson
- Born: 2 August 1979 (age 47); Grimsby, Lincolnshire, England
- Batting: Right-handed
- Bowling: Right arm fast-medium
- Role: Bowler
- Relatives: James Pattinson (brother)

International information
- National side: England
- Only Test (cap 640): 18 July 2008 v South Africa

Domestic team information
- Years: Team
- 2006/07–2012/13: Victoria (squad no. 21)
- 2008–2012: Nottinghamshire (squad no. 14)
- 2012/13: Melbourne Renegades

Career statistics
Competition	Test	FC	LA	T20
Matches	1	62	69	64
Runs scored	21	763	103	40
Batting average	10.50	12.93	8.58	6.66
100s/50s	0/0	0/1	0/0	0/0
Top score	13	59	16*	12*
Balls bowled	181	9,840	2,701	1,204
Wickets	2	171	93	73
Bowling average	48.00	32.99	26.23	21.28
5 wickets in innings	0	8	0	1
10 wickets in match	0	0	0	0
Best bowling	2/95	8/35	4/29	5/25
Catches/stumpings	0/–	7/–	17/–	17/–
- Source: CricketArchive, 22 August 2019

Darren John Pattinson (born 2 August 1979) is an English former cricketer who played for Victoria and Nottinghamshire. Pattinson received considerable press coverage when he was surprisingly selected for the England cricket team in July 2008 for the 2nd Test against South Africa at Headingley. Former England captain Graham Gooch described his selection as "one of the most leftfield decisions I've ever seen".

== Playing career ==
Pattinson, born in England, grew up in Australia and played for Dandenong Cricket Club in Victorian Premier Cricket. During the 2006–07 season, a spate of injuries to a number of bowlers resulted in Pattinson's selection for the Victorian team. In January 2007, he made his first-class debut against South Australia at the Melbourne Cricket Ground, capturing four wickets for 87 runs in the first innings. His subsequent performances during the summer earned him a contract with Victoria for 2007–08; however, he played only two first-class matches for the season. Employed as a roof-tiler, he sought to further his career as a professional cricketer by signing a two-year contract to play with Nottinghamshire in the English County Championship, commencing in 2008. Making his debut for the county against Kent on 16 April, he took five for 22 in the first innings. He followed up with a haul of 6 for 30 against Lancashire at Trent Bridge.

=== Controversial selection for England ===
On 3 July 2008, Pattinson made his first appearance in an international squad when named in England's 30-man squad for the ICC Champions Trophy. A fortnight later, he was called up as cover for James Anderson for England's second Test against South Africa at Headingley. The next day, Ryan Sidebottom was ruled out of the team by a back injury, so Pattinson was selected to make his Test debut.

Pattinson's selection was the result of excellent form for Nottinghamshire (29 wickets at an average of just over 20 runs each) in the early part of the 2008 season. It marked an incredible rise for the player: prior to the Test, he had played in just 11 first-class matches. According to Christopher Martin-Jenkins, Pattinson's debut call-up was "...the biggest rabbit-out-of-the-hat for 99 years", in reference to Douglas Carr. Former England captain, Ian Botham, was more forthright, describing it as:

The most illogical, pathetic and diabolical piece of selecting I've seen. The selectors have embarrassed English cricket. I want to hear a proper explanation for this, as do England fans around the country.

Another former captain, Geoffrey Boycott, said:

This was one of the first big decisions taken by England's new selection panel, and they got it badly wrong. They need to admit their mistake and realise that wild hunches are no way to build an international cricket team.

Following England's defeat, captain Michael Vaughan appeared to criticise the selection, saying:

It does look a confused selection, but the selection of one person does not lose you a Test.

Vaughan later met the selectors to clarify his comment and 'clear the air'. On BBC Radio 5live's Fighting Talk programme, Vaughan later explained that the real reason for Pattinson's selection over Hoggard was:

"Matthew Hoggard - it was his benefit year. The game started on a Thursday. The injury [to Sidebottom] happened on a Wednesday and on the Tuesday Matthew Hoggard had had a benefit function and he was absolutely trolleyed. That's why we couldn't pick him."

=== Test debut ===
On debut against South Africa at Headingley, Pattinson came out to bat at number 11, scoring 8 runs as England folded for 203. He then opened the bowling with James Anderson on the first day of the Second Test. On the second day of that Test he picked up the wicket of Hashim Amla, although TV footage put the soundness of the LBW decision in doubt. He took his second wicket when he had Ashwell Prince caught behind for 149 to finish with figures of two for 95 from 30 overs as South Africa racked up 522 all out. He put down a difficult caught and bowled chance offered by Mark Boucher and also dropped Dale Steyn late in the innings but this was relatively inexpensive as Steyn was batting with last man Makhaya Ntini at the time, who was dismissed shortly afterwards.

Batting late on in England's second innings, he scored 13 runs in a last wicket partnership of 61 with Stuart Broad which ensured South Africa had to bat again, before the winning run was scored off his own bowling as South Africa secured a ten-wicket win.

=== Post-Test career ===
Pattinson returned to play for Victoria in the 2009–10 season, but despite playing for England, was not one of the better fast bowlers for Victoria and was usually overlooked for selection. His younger brother, James, was preferred. However, injuries to fast bowlers including James led to Darren being picked for the team on most occasions in the later half of the season.

He returned to England for the 2010 season to play county cricket with Nottinghamshire. That season, Nottinghamshire won the County Championship with Pattinson contributing 31 wickets in the competition. His tally of 17 wickets in the Friends Provident t20 meant that he was the club's leading wicket-taker in the T20 format for 2010.

Pattinson began the 2010–11 Australian season by taking career-best figures of 8/35 against Western Australia.

== Personal life ==
Pattinson's younger brother James has played both Test and ODI cricket for Australia, after making his debut in both forms in 2011. He has two daughters, Sophie and Olivia.

=== Greyhound training ===
In 2013, Pattinson took out a public greyhound training licence. His most prolific greyhound was Blazin’ Bomber who won 27 of his 60 races but was unable to record a victory in a Group 1.

== See also ==
- One Test Wonder
