= 2015 Australian greyhound racing live baiting scandal =

Animal welfare scandal in Australia

The 2015 Australian greyhound racing live baiting scandal was a major animal welfare controversy in the Australian greyhound racing industry involving the use of live animals to train racing greyhounds. On 16 February 2015, the ABC television current affairs program Four Corners broadcast covert footage showing live piglets, possums and rabbits being used as bait on training tracks in New South Wales, Queensland, and Victoria. The program alleged that the practice had occurred over a number of years despite industry regulations prohibiting the practice.

The revelations prompted widespread public condemnation, the suspension of trainers and officials, and a series of government inquiries. In July 2016, the NSW Government announced a ban on greyhound racing to take effect from 1 July 2017, and the Australian Capital Territory announced a similar prohibition from 30 April 2018. The NSW ban was reversed in October 2016 following political and industry opposition, subject to new regulatory conditions.

== Background ==
Greyhound racing is an organised, competitive sport in which greyhounds are raced around a track, chasing a mechanical lure over a fixed distance. Historically, the sport is based on the principle of coursing. It is a legalised form of gambling in many jurisdictions. Some greyhound trainers believe that greyhounds will chase better, and hence have a greater chance of winning the race, if they have chased and caught a live animal during training. The live bait animal is either attached to the mechanical lure, dragged in front of the greyhound, or thrown to it. The greyhound will often maim or kill the bait animal, resulting in death.

== Controversy ==
The greyhound industry and the law provide harsh penalties for the use of live baits in training. Nevertheless, accusations of live baiting in the Australian greyhound industry have arisen from time to time.

On 16 February 2015, Four Corners exposed live baiting on training tracks in Queensland, New South Wales and Victoria. The program included graphic surveillance footage, filmed by pro-animal activists, that showed various small animals being tied to mechanical lures where they were chased, caught and attacked by greyhounds for up to 30 minutes. Some animals had young taken and given to the dogs. The program also included interviews with many leading greyhound trainers and administrators who denied the practice of live baiting; some of them were subsequently shown to be involved in the live baiting.

The program’s graphic content drew immediate and widespread criticism from animal protection groups and the wider community.

National Party Member of Parliament and Minister Barnaby Joyce criticised activists who apparently trespassed to record video of live baiting by trainers.

== Reactions ==
=== Australian Capital Territory ===
- After announcement of the intended NSW ban, Chief Minister Andrew Barr stated that greyhound racing would be banned in the ACT.

=== New South Wales ===
- Five registered participants were immediately stood down.
- The Greyhound Racing NSW board was dismissed and the Chief Executive Officer, Brent Hogan, stood aside.
- Former High Court of Australia justice Michael McHugh was appointed to lead a review of the industry.
- Following the McHugh inquiry, the Premier announced on 7 July 2016 that greyhound racing would be banned in NSW from 1 July 2017.

On 2 August a rally opposing the ban was held at Hyde Park, Sydney. On 5 August 2016 an alliance of greyhound racing groups took the matter to the Supreme Court of NSW in pursuit of a declaration that the inquiry report was invalid. After running newspaper advertisements supporting the ban, the NSW Government was criticised by Brenton Scott, the chief executive of the Greyhound Breeders, Owners and Trainers Association. Luke Foley, NSW Labor leader, led his party's opposition to the ban. In August 2016 legislation was introduced into the NSW Legislative Assembly and three National MPs crossed the floor to vote against the government; with one Liberal MP abstaining from the vote. Despite these protests, the legislation passed the lower house.

On 11 October 2016 the reversal of the NSW ban was announced, with several conditions.

In the wake of the NSW greyhound racing ban, the NSW Government established the Greyhound Welfare and Integrity Commission (GWIC) separating the regulatory, welfare and integrity aspects of NSW greyhound racing from the business, commercial and marketing responsibilities which continue under Greyhound Racing New South Wales (GRNSW).

=== Queensland ===
- 13 trainers are under investigation; 6 have been suspended.
- Macro Meats withdrew its sponsorship of the sport.
- Jonathan Brown resigned as an ambassador.
- One trainer was removed from the Racing Queensland Hall of Fame.
- The racing industry integrity officer was stood down.
- All Racing Queensland boards dismissed.
- Tom Noble, on whose race track the live baiting was occurring, pleaded guilty and was sentenced on 6 September 2016 to 15 counts of serious animal cruelty. Serious Animal cruelty in the Queensland Criminal Code attracts a maximum penalty of 7 years and yet Noble only received a 3 year wholly suspended sentence. Queensland Attorney-General Yvette D'Ath announced her decision to appeal the sentence on the grounds it was manifestly inadequate. Tom Noble appeared in the appeals court on 17 March 2017. The decision is yet to be announced.

=== South Australia ===
- Greyhound Racing SA immediately announced that anyone found to be engaging in the practice would be banished from the sport and prosecuted where possible. The chief executive said that he had no evidence that live baiting was happening in South Australia but "we take little comfort from that because our monitoring processes aren't dissimilar from the eastern seaboard... We shouldn't be satisfied that our monitoring is working – I think we need to accept that, quite clearly". The relevant state government ministers, RSPCA, police and Greyhound Racing SA met to consider a response, including possible changes to legislation to facilitate investigation and be tougher to prevent live baiting.

=== Tasmania ===
In March 2015, the Tasmanian Government established a Joint Select Committee on Greyhound Racing to investigate the industry in response to the revelations interstate. The committee released its final report on 14 September 2016, finding that there was "no evidence identified that could result in a prosecution for live baiting in Tasmania," though it relied on anecdotal evidence to conclude that the practice could not be entirely ruled out.

The report made 31 recommendations, including:

- Implementing mandatory lifetime bans for anyone found guilty of live baiting.
- Maintaining a strict separation between the Office of Racing Integrity (ORI) and the commercial body, Tasracing.
- Granting stewards greater powers to seize evidence and question unlicensed persons.
- Making government funding conditional on animal welfare outcomes.

The Tasmanian Greens released a dissenting report, arguing that the committee had sided too heavily with the industry and calling for a total ban on the sport. RSPCA Tasmania criticised the government's response, suggesting that financial revenue was being prioritised over animal welfare.

=== Victoria ===
- The Victorian Government announced two separate investigations.
- 15 trainers have been suspended pending an investigation, including former administrators and a Trainer of the Year.
- The chairman of Greyhound Racing Victoria resigned.
