= Golden Easter Egg =

Australian Greyhound race

- Class: Group 1
- Location: Wentworth Park; Glebe, Sydney, New South Wales, Australia
- Inaugurated: 1990; 36 years ago
- Race type: 10 qualifying heats; 4 semi-finals; 8 dogs in the final
- Sponsor: Ladbrokes
- Website: www.thedogs.com.au/features/golden-easter-egg

Race information
- Distance: 520 metres (1,710 ft)
- Record: 29.27s
- Surface: Sand
- Qualification: Best 80 nominated Maidens ineligible
- Purse: A$ 300,000 to winner; A$1 million total across carnival

The Golden Easter Egg is an Australian Group 1 greyhound race held annually at Sydney's Wentworth Park racetrack in Glebe. Held annually on Easter Saturday it carries Group 1 status from AGRA, the code's racing regulator. The Golden Easter Egg carnival is in fact held over three weekends, commencing with heat events (8 in total), then followed by Semi Finals week (4 in total) and the Final Event in the third week. The first and second placegetters from the four semi final events fill the places in the final.

Prize money of around $1,000,000 ($350,000 to the winner in 2024) making it one the richest greyhound carnivals in Australia.

== History ==
The first Golden Easter Egg was held at Wentworth Park, Sydney in 1990.

In 2012 it was the richest greyhound race in the world at the time.

Past winners

Golden Easter Egg Winners since inaugural 1990 race are:

Year	Winner	Trainer	Time	Notes
1990	Ultra Sense	C M Coleman	30.39	
1991	Highly Blessed	L Ferremi	29.98	
1992	Jessica Casey	J Finn	30.32	
1993	Billy Binjang	P Seymour	30.70	
1994	Mancunian Girl	P S Wardle	30.20	
1995	Malawi Law	Graeme Bate	30.34	
1996	Tenthill Doll	H P Sarkis	30.51	
1997	Bahama Image	W McNally	30.59	
1998	Rapid Journey	J Carruthers	30.17	
1999	Faithful Hawk	P Rayner	29.93	
2000	Stately Bird	K Paull	30.35	
2001	Brett Lee	Darren McDonald	30.04	
2002	Carlisle Jack	R Douglas	30.09	
2003	Cyrus The Virus	S Swain	30.21	
2004	Bogie Leigh	T Brett	30.07	
2005	Paua to Burn	S White	29.98	
2006	Edie Beauchamp	M Wright	29.80	
2007	Slater	Darren Murray	30.09	
2008	Blazing Token	Max Burdekin	30.16	
2009	Dana Beatrice	Rod McDonald	29.70	
2010	Cosmic Rumble	Darren McDonald	30.12	
2011	Radley Bale	Graeme Bate	29.66	
2012	Don't Knocka Him	Jason Thompson	29.60	
2013	Grigorieva Bale	Andrea Dailly	29.65	
2014	Tonk	Brooke Ennis	29.62	
2015	Fernando Bale	Andrea Dailly	29.48	
2016	Moreira	Jason Thompson	29.77	
2017	Striker Light	Brett Bravo	29.99	
2018	Up Hill Jill	David Geall	29.77	
2019	Zipping Bailey	Jason Mackay	29.92	
2020	Cancelled due to COVID-19			
2021	Tommy Shelby	Steve Withers	29.27	race record
2022	She's A Pearl	Jodie Lord	29.73	
2023	Simply Limelight	Peter Rodgers	29.48	
2024	Mackenna	Michelle Sultana	29.33	

== See also ==
- Greyhound racing in Australia
