= Geelong Greyhound Racing Club =

Greyhound racing venue in Corio, Geelong, Victoria

The Beckley Centre
- Interactive map of The Beckley Centre
- Location: Beckley Park, Broderick Road, Corio, Geelong, Victoria
- Coordinates: 38°03′41″S 144°22′52″E
- Operator: Geelong Greyhound Racing Club
- Surface: Sand

Construction
- Opened: 7 March 1980
- Renovated: 2008

Geelong Greyhound Racing Club or The Beckley Centre is a greyhound racing venue located at Beckley Park, Broderick Road, Corio, Geelong, Victoria. The Beckley Centre is operated by the Geelong Greyhound Racing Club (GGRC) and regulated by Greyhound Racing Victoria (GRV). It hosts the Geelong Cup and has race distances over 400, 460, 520, 596 and 680 metres. Racing is conducted on Tuesday and Friday and occasional Saturdays.

The venue features both an outer track and a two-turn inner track.

== History ==
Greyhound racing in Geelong began in 1936 and was originally held at Nelson Park in North Geelong, near the Melbourne Road. In 1956 greyhound racing and the Geelong Trotting Club moved into the vacant Corio Oval (the former home of Geelong Football Club). Both the greyhound racing and Trotting Club remained there until the late 1970s, before they moved to the present site on Beckley Park, where facilities were constructed costing $650,000. The first greyhound meeting was held on Friday 7 March 1980. A major upgrade took place in 1997, the upgrade included renovation of the grandstand and cost $250,000.

In March 2008, the GGRC began a $10 million project that would result in a new facility called The Beckley Centre. Initially $1.2 million was spent building an administrative building and kennel block. In 2010, redevelopment works included upgrades to the main grandstand buildings, incorporating a 240-seat track-view restaurant.

As part of the broader Beckley Park redevelopment, a second racing circuit was constructed on the inside of the existing track. The two-turn inside track was designed to replicate metropolitan circuit configurations and accommodates race distances of approximately 518 and 596 metres, and was named the Bate Track in honour of trainer Graeme Bate. In 2014, following Bate’s disqualification on doping charges, GRV indicated it would review the naming honour attached to the Beckley Park complex.

In October 2017, the track temporarily closed due to mechanical faults affecting the lure system and catching pen gates, with scheduled meetings transferred to other Victorian venues. Racing later resumed using a “finish on lure” system, and modifications were made to the track surface, including adjustments to camber and top-dressing.

== Safety and welfare ==
The venue has periodically attracted media and public scrutiny regarding track safety following reported race-related incidents and on-track deaths. In 2021 and 2022, local media reported multiple greyhound deaths at the track and calls from animal welfare advocates for independent review, while GRV said track deaths are investigated and described investments in safety upgrades. In 2025, additional on-track fatalities were reported, prompting calls from animal welfare groups for an inquiry, while GRV stated that incidents are investigated under its welfare and compliance processes.

== Track distances ==
| Track | Distance (metres) |
|---|---|
| Outside | 400 |
| Outside | 460 |
| Inside | 520 |
| Inside | 596 |
| Outside | 680 |

== Geelong Cup ==
The Geelong Cup, first held in 1962, is the club's principal feature race.

== Track records ==
Current track records

| Distance (metres) | Time (seconds) | Greyhound | Date Set | Trainer |
|---|---|---|---|---|
| 400 | 22.010 | Aston Bolero | 26 August 2016 | Jason Thompson |
| 460 | 25.106 | Black Magic Opal | 18 October 2013 | Jason Thompson |
| 520 | 29.518 | Fernando Express | 27 July 2018 | Robert Britton |
| 596 | 33.968 | Xylia Allen | 15 February 2013 | Graeme Bate |
| 680 | 38.719 | Burn One Down | 9 June 2017 | Seona Thompson |
