= Tin hare =

Greyhound racing lure

Tin hare (Note: The term may have been influenced by "tinned hare", one of many kinds of canned meat popular before refrigeration or the "Tinners' rabbits", a motif associated with Dartmoor tin mining and elsewhere.) is a colloquial term in Australia and New Zealand for the mechanical lure used in the sport or pastime of greyhound racing.

In coursing parlance, the term dates back to at least 1927, when debate raged as to whether a mechanical lure served the same purpose as a live hare for gambling purposes. It was argued that if dogs could be trained to chase an inanimate lure, such racing would be equally effective as live animals in developing speed of the breed, and more humane. The die was cast when "tin hare" racing, which originated in England but not by that name, was found to be profitable.

The term has, by extension, been used for various railmotors.

- CPH railmotors, a total of 37 lightweight petrol, later diesel,-powered railcars, built 1923– ; in service with New South Wales railways from 1923 to 1985.

- The Tin Hare Gazette is a periodical published by the Rail Motor Society of New South Wales.

- The Gulflander, a Queensland Railways 1800 class rail motor set, is known as "The Old Tin Hare".
- An improvised privately-operated railcar (and its replacement) on the Berrima railway line
