= Cannington Greyhounds =

Greyhound racing track in Perth, Western Australia

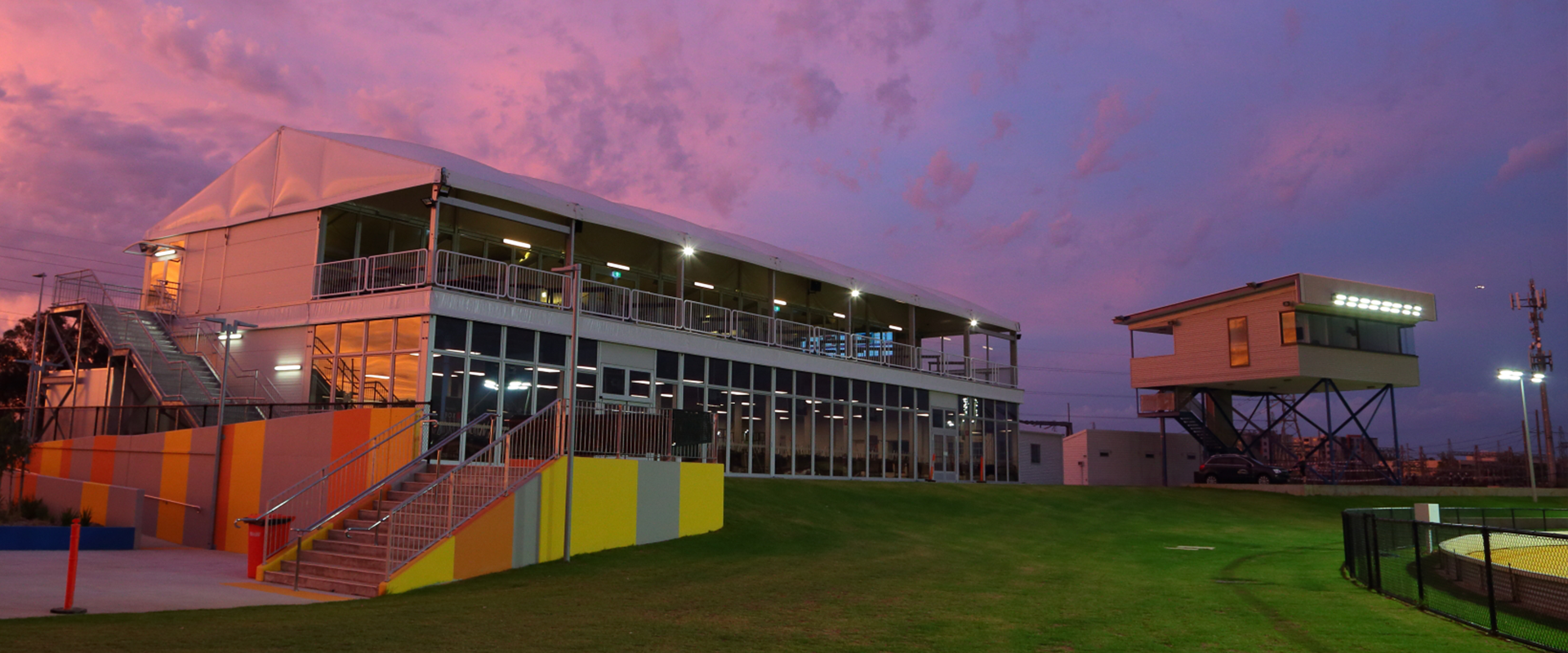
- Restaurant at Cannington Greyhounds
- Interactive map of Cannington Greyhounds
- Former names: Cannington Central (1974–1983)
- Location: Station Street, Cannington, Western Australia
- Coordinates: 32°01′17″S 115°56′33″E
- Owner: Western Australian Greyhound Racing Association (WAGRA)
- Operator: WAGRA
- Capacity: 5,000
- Surface: Northam River Sand
- Scoreboard: Electronic LED Video Board
- Record attendance: 15,000 (Opening night)
- Public transit: Cannington railway station

Construction
- Opened: 12 December 1974
- Renovated: 23 March 2016
- Cost: A$14 million

Website
- www.greyhoundswa.com.au/new-cannington/

Cannington Greyhounds is a greyhound racing venue on Station Street and Grey Street near Albany Highway in Cannington, Western Australia. The venue is owned and operated by the Western Australian Greyhound Racing Association (WAGRA). Race meetings take place most Monday, Wednesday and Saturday nights and some Sundays. Race distances are 275, 380, 520, 600, and 715 metres (902, 1,247, 1,706, 1,969, and 2,346 ft).

== History ==
Canning Greyhound Racing Association was granted a licence on 18 September 1973 to host greyhound racing. In January 1974 construction of the first metropolitan track in Western Australia commenced at the Canning Agricultural Society Showgrounds on Station Road adjacent to Albany Highway. Consisting of a 5,000 capacity stand and tiered grandstand restaurant, a $150,000 indicator board, $85,000 kennel block, seven bars and fast food outlets, and 100 totalisator outlets, the project cost $1.8 million. Upon completion, the venue was named Cannington Central.

The first race meeting was held on 12 December 1974, comprising eight races with an attendance of over 15,000 people. The first race winner was a greyhound called David Volo, trained by Sammy Blackburn in a time of 32.54 seconds.

In 1981 legislation was passed under the Western Australia Greyhound Racing Association Act that transferred the assets and liabilities of the Canning Greyhound Racing Association to the WAGRA.

In April 1989 Cannington Greyhounds switched to a sand-based track with the first race on sand being run on 22 April 1989. The next upgrade was to an above ground lure system, which was first used at Cannington Greyhounds on 21 January 2001. The track hosted the AGRA National Championships in 1984, 1993, 1998, 2004, 2009, 2014 and 2019. In total, WAGRA has won the National Distance Championships three times with greyhound Paradise Street winning at Cannington Greyhounds in 1998, greyhound Miata winning in Hobart in 2012 and greyhound Reidy's Runner at Cannington Greyhounds in 2029.

=== 2015 relocation ===
In 2014 a new venue was proposed to be built adjacent to the original venue. On 27 June 2015 the final race was held at the original venue, with greyhound All Strung Out trained by Chris Halse winning the last race in 30.72 seconds. A Bunnings warehouse now occupies the site of the original venue.

Construction of the new venue started in late 2015 and opened on 23 March 2016 with race distances of 275, 380, 520 and 600 metres (902, 1,247, 1,706 and 1,969 ft). Greyhound Glass Cutter trained by Enzo Crudelli won the first race in a time of 30.67 seconds. The venue features the Box 1 Bar & Restaurant and hosts major races including the Perth Cup and Perth Galaxy.

== Track Records 1974–2015 ==
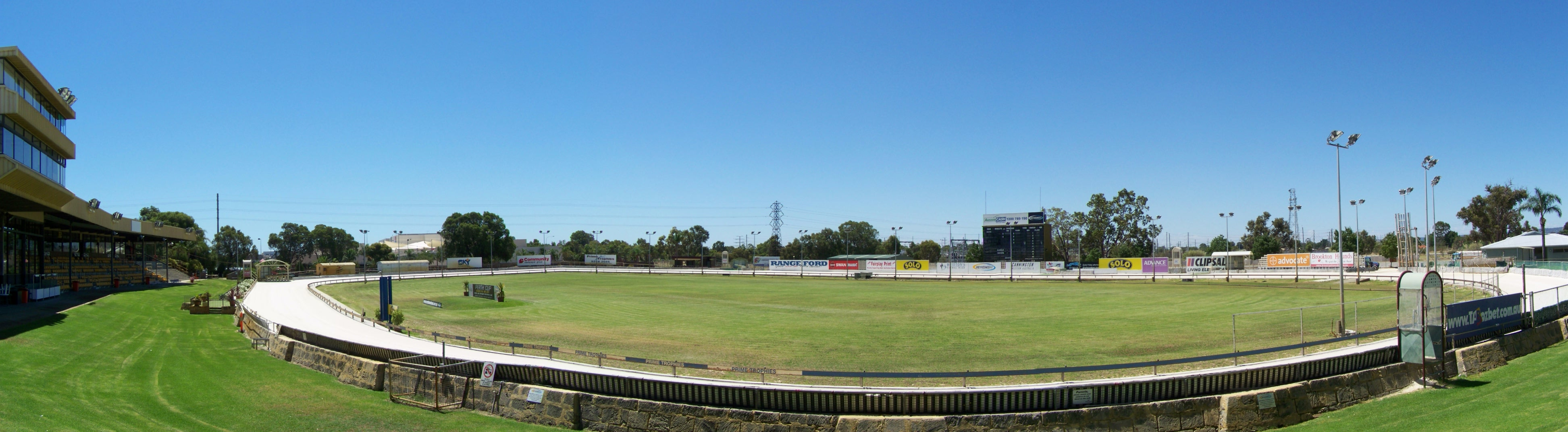
Old Cannington track

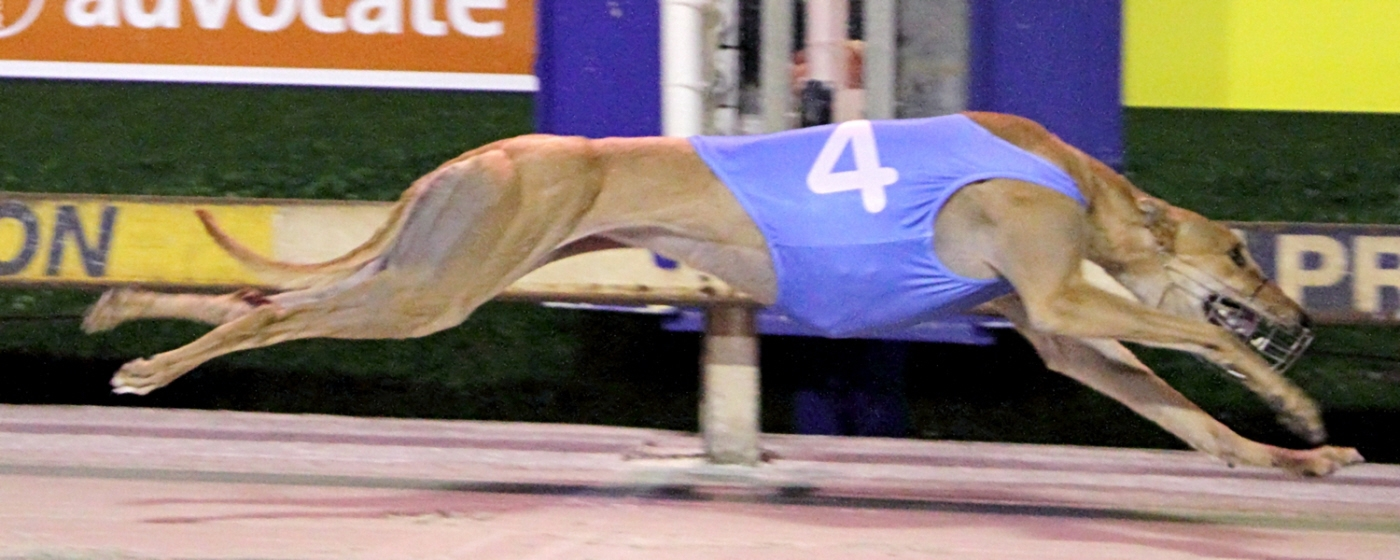
Miata breaking the track record

Records on the original track.

Distance (m)	Distance (ft)	Greyhound	Date	Time (S)
297	974	Lindback	11 June 2014	16.81
530	1,740	Miata	17 August 2011	29.81
642	2,106	Miata	10 December 2011	36.55
715	2,346	Miata	7 January 2012	41.30
744	2,441	Jedi Lightsaber	31 August 2002	43.95

== Current Track Records ==
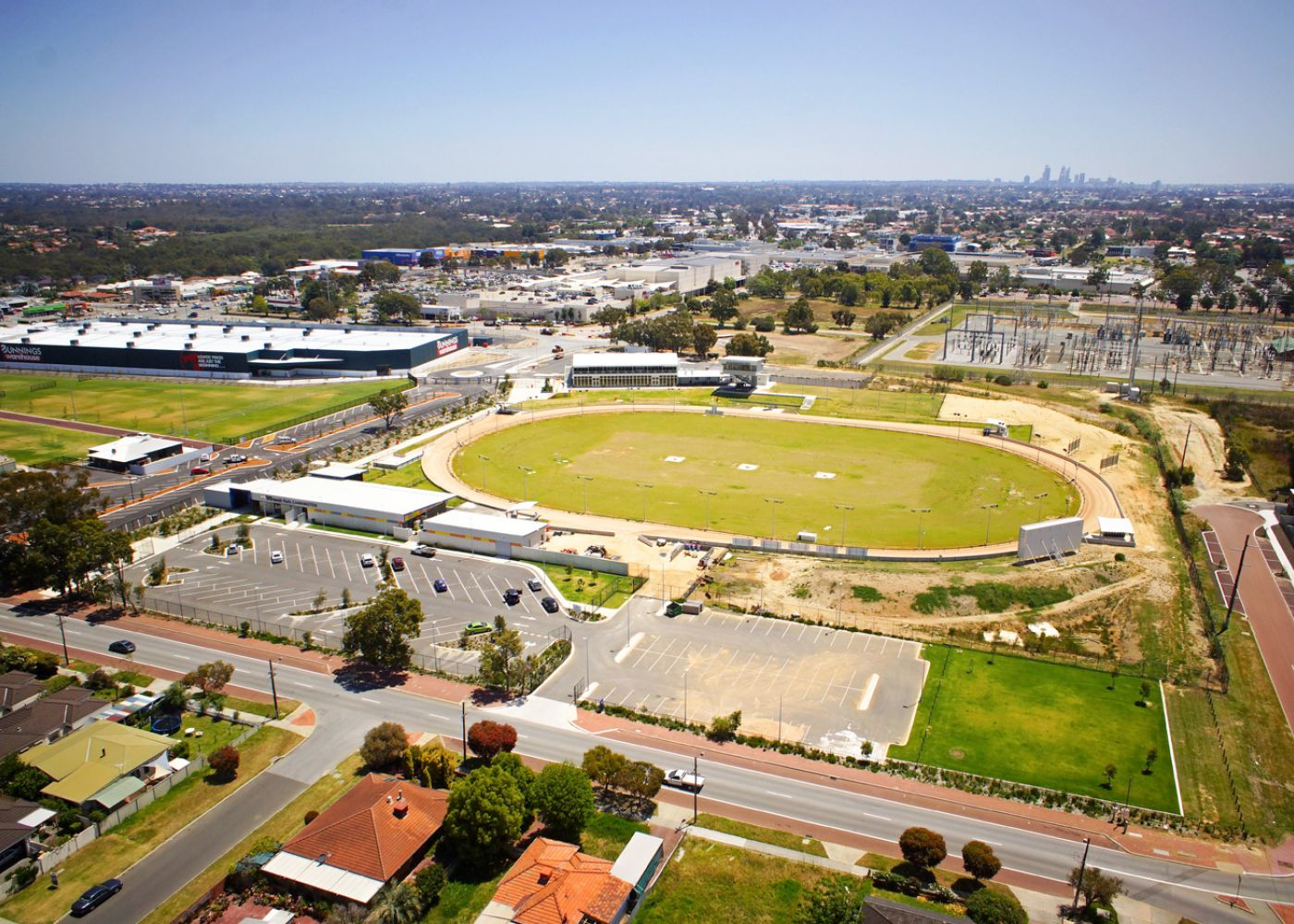
Birds eye view of the track

Records on the new track, as of 22 July 2022.

Distance (m)	Distance (ft)	Greyhound	Date	Time (S)
275	902	Watch Me Browse	18 January 2023	15.47
380	1,250	Frida Monelli	24 February 2018	21.47
380	415	Sassy Snickers	17 February 2024	21.47
520	1,710	Campini	18 January 2020	29.26
600	2,000	Mambo Monelli	31 December 2021	34.20
715	2,346	Tornado Tears	16 March 2019	41.25

== Top Runs ==
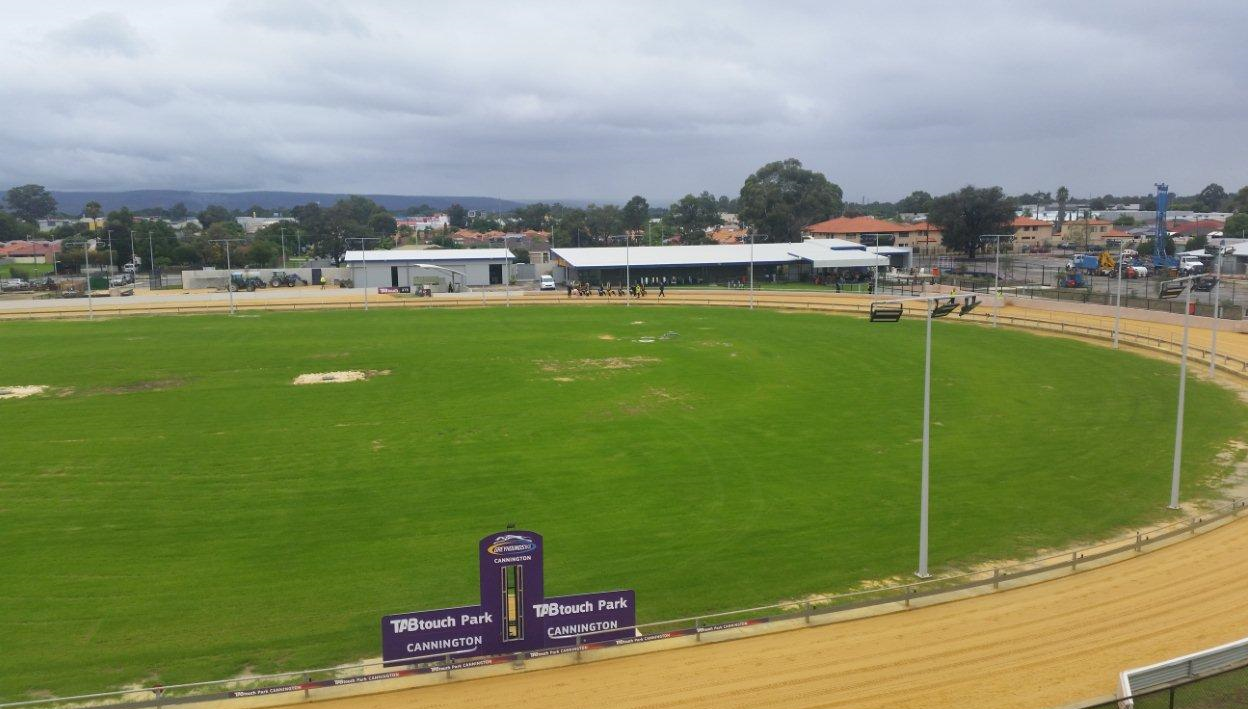
Greyhounds walking to the 275 m (902 ft) boxes

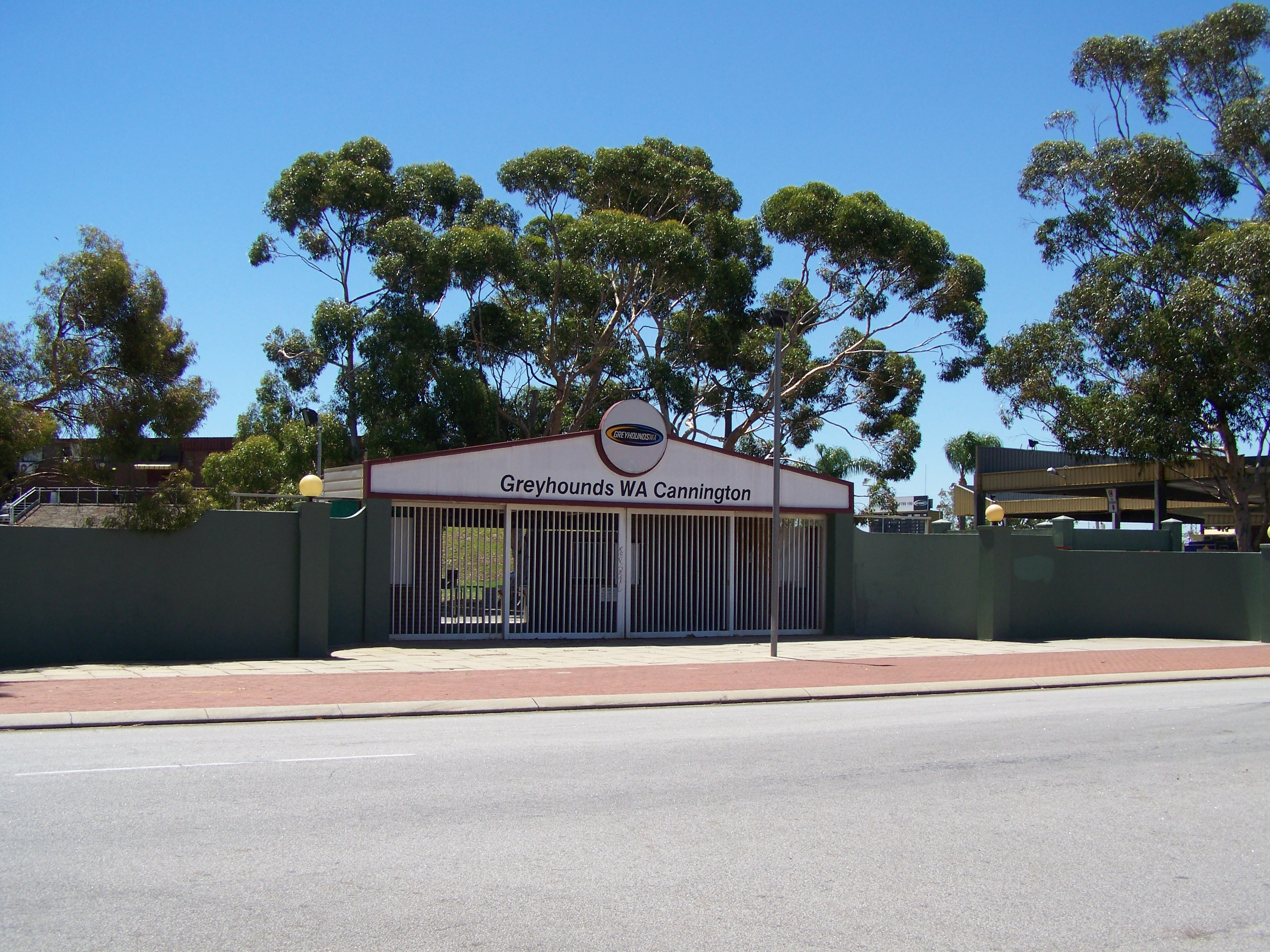
Main gate at old Cannington track

Top 10 runs over 275 m (902 ft)
Greyhound	Time (S)	Grade	Date
Watch Me Browse	15.47	Novice	18/01/2023
Watch Me Browse	15.51	Novice	05/12/2022
Wells Of Silence	15.57	Free To All	05/05/2023
Wells Of Silence	15.61	Free To All	28/04/2023
Zonte	15.64	Free To All	22/09/2023
Renegade Cochise	15.65	Free To All	01/04/2024
Zonte	15.66	Free To All	21/07/2023
Try Catch Me	15.67	Free To All	14/12/2020
Grass Patch	15.68	Free To All	11/03/2024
Rex Hunter	15.70	Free To All	20/10/2023

Top 10 runs over 380 m (1,250 ft)
Greyhound	Time (S)	Grade	Date
Frida Monelli	21.47	Mixed 3/4	24/02/2018
Sassy Snickers	21.47	Grade 5	17/02/2024
Dandalup Brutus	21.48	Novice	18/02/2017
Hello I'm Leo	21.48	Sprinters' Plate Final	26/04/2017
Einsteinium	21.49	Grade 5	27/06/2020
Counting Kuna	21.50	Free To All	24/03/2021
Squillionaire	21.51	Mixed 4/5	01/04/2020
Counting Kuna	21.51	Free To All	20/02/2021
Who Told Spider	21.51	Free To All	29/10/2022
Fabriola Ali	21.51	Free To All	09/11/2022

Top 10 runs over 520 m (1,710 ft)
Greyhound	Time (S)	Grade	Date
Campini	29.26	Free To All	18/01/2022
Quick Jagger	29.29	Novice	06/06/2017
Orson Allen	29.32	Perth Cup Heat	16/03/2019
Catch The Thief	29.32	WA Derby Final	23/05/2020
Sunset Spitfire	29.39	Anniversary Cup Heat	28/10/2020
Zack Monelli	29.39	Mixed 3/4	05/12/2020
Throttle	29.39	Mixed 4/5	30/07/2020
Trooper Tears	29.39	Perth Cup Heat	09/03/2024
West On Augie	29.40	Puppy Classic Heat	17/03/2018
Redcap Monelli	29.41	Mixed 4/5	26/04/2021

== Major races ==
Every year Cannington host the Group 1 Perth Cup and Galaxy. Some of best greyhounds in Australia target the Group 1's. As of 2017 the Perth Cup is run over 520 m (1,710 ft) and is worth $150,000 to the winner, and the Group 1 Galaxy is run over 715 m (2,346 ft) and is worth over $100,000 to the winner.

== Perth Cup ==
Extended content

Roll of Honour

Perth Cup
- Class: Group 1 Greyhound Event
- Inaugurated: 1976
- Sponsor: Sky Racing

Race information
- Distance: 520 m (1,710 ft)
- Surface: Sand
- Qualification: 8 heats winners go through to the final
- Purse: $150,000 to the winner

Year	Greyhound	Time (S)	Distance (m)	Distance (ft)	Notes
1976	Marcus Rate	32.09	530	1,740	
1977	Canonero's Gift	32.12	530	1,740	
1978	Biafra's Son	31.65	530	1,740	
1979	Rare Discovery	31.34	530	1,740	
1980	White Panther	31.00	530	1,740	
1981	General Jeff	30.94	530	1,740	
1982	Wotta Wizard	31.12	530	1,740	
1983	Superstar	31.66	530	1,740	
1984	Legatee	31.02	530	1,740	
1985	Supreme Carmen	31.15	530	1,740	
1986	Farquhar	31.01	530	1,740	
1987	Pretty Fearless	31.01	530	1,740	
1988	Karinya Flash	31.65	530	1,740	
1989	Miss Crisp	30.89	530	1,740	
1990	Sand Pebble	31.63	530	1,740	
1991	Frantic Night	31.98	530	1,740	
1992	Wynlee Supreme	32.15	530	1,740	
1993	Amy's Doll	31.45	530	1,740	
1994	Just Like Whisky	31.21	530	1,740	
1995	Brisk Bill	30.94	530	1,740	
1996	Tenthill Doll	30.70	530	1,740	
1997	Star Tribute	30.96	530	1,740	
1998	Rapid Journey	30.68	530	1,740	
1999	Bliss Bale	31.20	530	1,740	
2000	Nifti Fire	31.14	530	1,740	
2001	Sammy Mint	30.71	530	1,740	
2002	Modern Assassin	30.60	530	1,740	
2003	Elgrando	30.57	530	1,740	
2004	Kilby Supreme	30.12	530	1,740	
2005	Sun Hero	30.24	530	1,740	
2006	Superman	30.17	530	1,740	
2007	Betty's Angel	30.47	530	1,740	
2008	Size Can Matter	30.22	530	1,740	
2009	Miss Slick	30.34	530	1,740	
2010	High Earner	29.97	530	1,740	
2011	High Earner	30.37	530	1,740	
2012	Oaks Road	30.22	530	1,740	
2013	Dyna Nalin	30.58	530	1,740	
2014	Keybow	30.15	530	1,740	
2015	My Bro Fabio	30.34	530	1,740	
2016	Ima Wagtail	30.29	520	1,710	New venue
2017	Equanimity	29.94	520	1,710	
2018	Trouper Monelli	29.86	520	1,710	
2019	Orson Allen	29.62	520	1,710	
2020	Simon Told Helen	29.82	520	1,710	
2021	Tiggerlong Tonk	29.76	520	1,710	
2022	Vice Grip	29.42	520	1,710	
2023	Elite Machine	30.15	520	1,710	
2024	Uncle Tommy	29.81	520	1,710	

Perth Cup records

- Largest Winning Margin Sand Pebble - 10 3/4 Lengths
- Race Record (530 m or 1,740 ft) High Earner - 29.97
- Race Record (520 m or 1,710 ft) Vice Grip - 29.42
- Smallest Winning Margin Ima Wagtail - Nose
- Oldest Winner Wynlee Supreme - 50 months

== Galaxy ==
Extended content

Roll of Honour

Galaxy
- Class: Group 1 Greyhound Event
- Inaugurated: 1982
- Sponsor: Sky Racing

Race information
- Distance: 715 m (2,346 ft) as of 2004
- Surface: Sand
- Qualification: 4 Heats, 1st and 2nd go into the final
- Purse: $100,000 to the Winner

Year	Greyhound	Time	Distance	Notes
1982	Afro Freeway	37.42	638m	
1983	Supreme Carmen	38.05	638m	
1984	Aulfee	38.15	638m	
1985	Lady Temlock	37.93	638m	
1986	Abilene	37.61	638m	
1987	Lassie's Girl	37.71	638m	
1988	Red Rambo	38.28	638m	
1989	Ghetto's Glider	39.10	638m	
1990	Busy City	38.95	638m	
1991	Galahad County	38.48	638m	
1992	Petite Emma	38.31	638m	
1993	Cousin Johnny	38.50	638m	
1994	Flora Kwondo	38.40	638m	
1995	Wits End	37.98	638m	
1996	Rocket Racer	37.89	638m	
1997	Germarly Bale	41.68	700m	
1998	Paradise Street	41.61	700m	
1999	Harvard Bale	41.59	700m	
2000	Alencia Bale	41.99	700m	
2001	Not held			
2002	Jennev	41.15	704m	
2003	Why Complain	41.15	704m	
2004	Winter	41.57	715m	
2005	Best Quoted	41.62	715m	
2006	Ronray Dancer	41.72	715m	
2007	Flashing Floods	41.56	715m	
2008	Elektra	41.48	715m	
2009	Western Land	41.82	715m	
2010	Drill' Em	41.33	715m	
2011	Blue Lorian	41.97	715m	
2012	Miata	41.30	715m	
2013	Miata	41.48	715m	
2014	Born Ali	42.05	715m	
2015	Space Star	41.63	715m	
2016	Seeking Justice	42.35	715m	New venue
2017	Bogie Bekim	42.22	715m	
2018	Rippin' Sam	41.70	715m	
2019	Rockstar Patriot	42.00	715m	
2020	Rockstar Patriot	41.98	715m	
2021	Zack Monelli	41.54	715m	race record
2022	Mambo Monelli	41.59	715m	
2023	First Picked	41.83	715m	
2024	West on Boonie	42.14	715m	

Galaxy records

Multiple Winning Trainers
Trainer	Wins	Year
Dot Houghton	2	1994, 1996
Grant Langston	2	1989, 1991
Paul Stuart	3	2012, 2013, 2019
Robert Britton	3	2014, 2015, 2018
Keith Harding	3	1982, 2008, 2016
Linda Britton	5	1998, 1999, 2002, 2004, 2009

Race Records for Each Distance
Distance (m)	Distance (ft)	Greyhound	Time (S)	Year	Note
638	2,093	Afro Freeway	37.42	1982	
700	2,300	Harvard Bale	41.59	1999	
715	2,346	Miata	41.30	2012	Original venue
715	2,346	Zack Monelli	41.54	2021	New venue

== Feature races ==
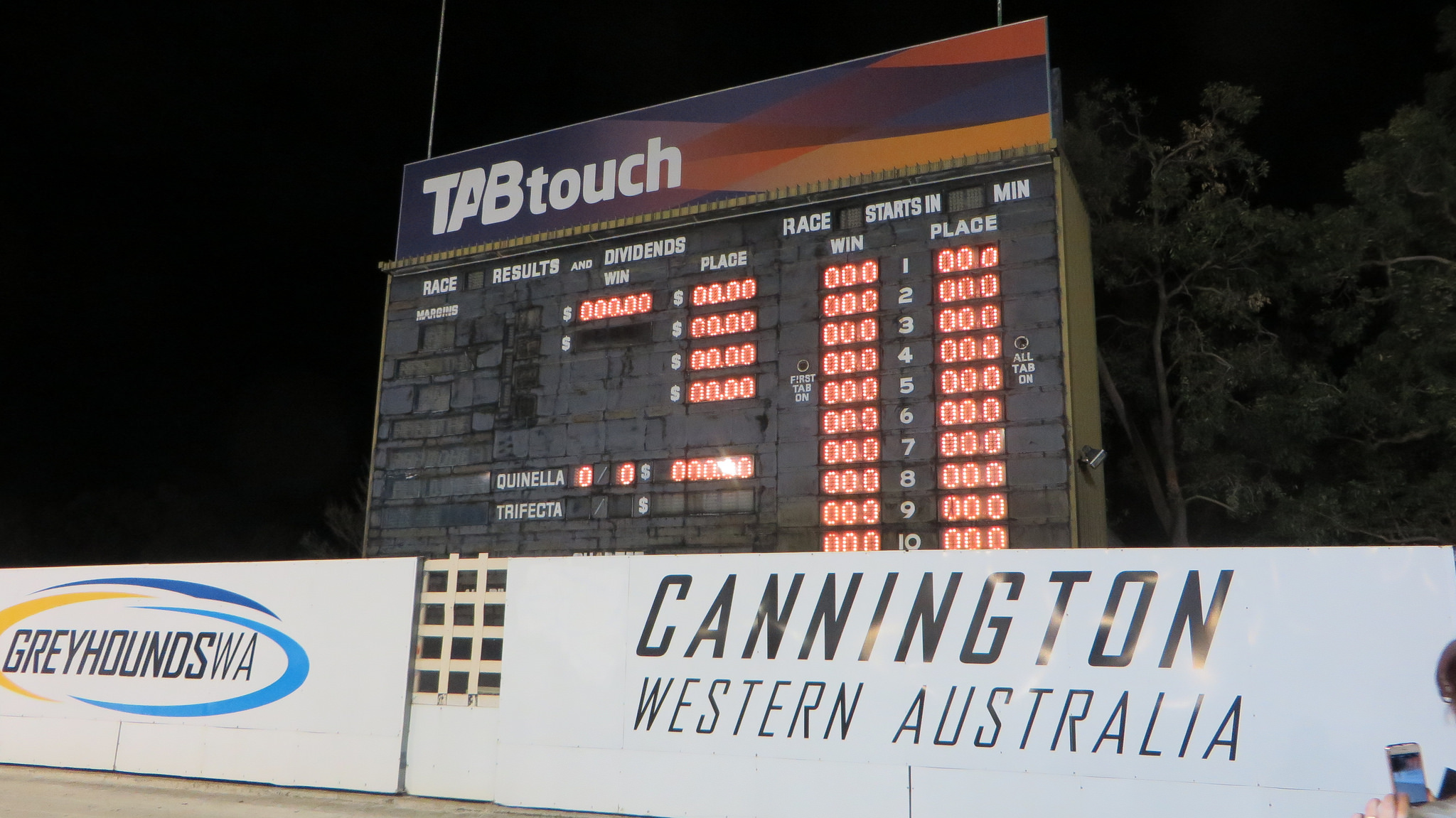
Old semaphore board at Cannington Greyhounds

Apart from the Group 1 Galaxy and Perth Cup, Cannington Greyhounds also runs a number of feature races throughout the year at the venue.

Race name	Distance	Prize money (To the winner)
Sprinters' Plate	380m	$7,000
Summer Chase	600m	$19,950
WA Distance Championship	715m	$19,950
Kanyana Trophy	520m	$7,000
WA Sprint Championship	520m	$19,950
The Peter Thomas	520m	$19,950
Spring Gift	520m	$19,950
WA Bred Championship	520m	$19,950
Anniversary Cup	520m	$19,950
Christmas Gift	715m	$19,950
Canning Trophy	520m	$19,950
Sandi's Me Mum Memorial	520m	$19,950
Lew Dorsa Memorial Trophy	520m	$19,950
Puppy Classic	520m	$19,950
Winter Cup	520m	$19,950
Paradise Street Trophy	600m	$19,950
The WESTCHA$E	520m	$19,950
Distance Potential	600m	$7,000
Perth Cup Consolation (2)	520m	$19,950
Group 3 Miata	715m	$25,000
Group 3 Young Stars Classic	520m	$25,000
Group 3 Perth Cup Consolation	520m	$25,000
Group 2 WA Derby	520m	$40,000
Group 2 WA Oaks	520m	$40,000
Group 2 All Stars Sprint	520m	$40,000
Group 1 Perth Cup	520m	$150,000
Group 1 Galaxy	715m	$100,000
Autumn Maiden Classic	520m	$7,000
Winter Maiden Classic	520m	$7,000
Summer Maiden Classic	520m	$7,000
Spring Maiden Classic	520m	$7,000
