= Sandown Greyhounds =

Greyhound racing track in Victoria, Australia

Sandown Park
- Location: Lightwood Road, Springvale, Victoria
- Coordinates: 37°57′23″S 145°09′37″E
- Operator: Sandown Greyhound Racing Club
- Surface: Burrumbeet Sand
- Opened: 8 September 1956

Sandown Greyhounds or Sandown Park is a greyhound racing track located in Springvale, Victoria, Australia. Sandown Park is operated by the Sandown Greyhound Racing Club and hosts the Melbourne Cup and the Sandown Cup.

The track opened on 8 September 1956 and typically races every Thursday evening and Sunday afternoon. The track has race distances over 515, 595 and 715 metres.

== Melbourne Cup ==
The Group 1 Melbourne Cup was the richest greyhound race in the Australia and was inaugurated in 1956. Trainers Darren McDonald, Graeme Bate and Jason Thompson have each won the Melbourne Cup on three occasions.

== Sandown Cup ==
The $250,000 Group 1 Sandown Cup is Australia's richest staying race. The race was previously known as the Woolamai Cup when first ran back in 1963. Race record is held by the 595m record holder at Sandown Park, Bobby Boucheau.

Honour Roll (From 2000)

Year	winner	Trainer
2000	Osti's Joker	Simon Barker
2001	Bentley Babe	Peter Dapiran
2002	Jennev	Linda Britton
2003	Arvo's Junior	George Arvanitis
2004	Proven Lethal	Jason Thompson
2005	Best Quoted	John Mooney
2006	Sargent Major	Lauren Gorman
2007	No Race	No Race
2008	Chinatown Lad	Shane Whitney
2009	Mantra Lad	Graeme Jose
2010	Next Top Model	Jason Thompson
2011	Bobby Boucheau	Angela Jackson
2012	Irma Bale	Graeme Bate
2013	Irma Bale	Graeme Bate
2014	Sweet It Is	Darren McDonald
2015	Sweet It Is	Braden Finn
2016	Bells Are Ringin	Gerry O'Keeffe
2017	Fanta Bale	Robert Britton
2018	Tornado Tears	Robert Britton
2019	Rajasthan	David Peckham
2020	Bronski Beat	Lisa J Cole

== Shootout ==
Four of Australia's fastest greyhounds compete for the $50,000 winner-takes-all first prize. The four dog race was first run in 1998, with the race earning Group 3 status in 2008.

Honour Roll (From 1998)

Year	winner	Trainer
1998	Reggimite	Allan Britton
1999	Great Wish	George Kantzidis
2000	Go Wild Teddy	Mark Bell
2001	Junior Whisky	Judy Hayley
2002	Silver Saul	Angela Modra
2003	Bombastic Shiraz	Darren Cairns
2004	Whisky Assassin	Jason Thompson
2005	Bond	Darren McDonald
2006	Jaimandy Coops	Paul Donohue
2007	Cool Effort	Darren McDonald
2008	Mantra Lad	Graeme Jose
2009	Velocette	Graeme Bate
2010	Cosmic Chief	Darren Brown
2011	Bekim Bale	Andrea Dailly
2012	Proven Nitro	Jason Thompson
2013	Xylia Allen	Jenny Hunt
2014	Iva Vision	Peter Young
2015	Kayda Shale	Kelly Bravo
2016	Zambora Brockie	Anthony Azzopardi
2017	Aston Dee Bee	Seona Thompson
2018	Orson Allen	Correy Grenfell
2019	Hooked On Scotch	Jason Thompson
2020	Tiggerlong Tonk	Correy Grenfell
