= Melbourne Cup (greyhounds) =

Australian greyhound racing competition

- Class: Group 1
- Location: Sandown Park
- Inaugurated: 1956

Race information
- Distance: 515 metres
- Surface: Sand
- Purse: $1,000,000 (winner $500,000)

The Melbourne Cup is a greyhound race in Australia. It is run over 515 metres (1,690 ft) at Sandown Park in Melbourne, Victoria, Australia in November.

== History ==
In 1956, the first Cup was staged at Sandown Park on the grass track over 565 yards under handicap condition and was worth £500 to the winner. In 1962, the Cup was won by Saskagay, the first bitch to win the race. The prize money was £2000. In 1966, handicap conditions were eliminated. Cheltenham Lass won after finishing second in 1965. In 1967, Neville Ballinger trained the Cup quinella with Swan Opal and Dollar Hunter. In 1970, Chris Dandy won for trainer Alex Kay, the fourth consecutive winner from New South Wales.

In 1978, actor Robert Stack presented the trophy and in 1979, actor Elke Sommer presented the trophy. In 1980, a silver Mercedes-Benz was given away to celebrate the 25th anniversary of the cup. The presenter was golfer Greg Norman. In 1985 with only a small kennel of four greyhounds, the Hall of Famer Ned Bryant trained the quinella with the Brian Lenehan owned Sydney Dingaan defeating Shining Chariot.

In 1992, Schweppes became the Cup sponsor and Master Giant the winner. In 2006, Betty's Angel completed the Group 1 ADVANCE Sapphire Crown – Schweppes Melbourne Cup double, setting a new race record of 29.51. In 2011, Dyna Tron in a race record 29.21 seconds. In 2020, Hard Style Rico became the first greyhound to break 29 seconds in a final when winning the final in 28.91.

In 2016, the Cup had total prize money of A$600,000.

== Past winners ==
Year	Winner	Trainer	Venue & distance	Time	Notes
1956	Rocketeer	E Patterson	(Sandown Park) 565 yards	30.6/16	
1957	Rookie Rebel	W Hopper	(Sandown Park) 565 yards	30.14/16	
1958	Marine Jet	G Fraser	(Sandown Park) 565 yards	30.9/16	
1959	Capital King	F Garbutt	(Sandown Park) 565 yards	30.9/16	
1960	Chief Ranee	M Hammond	(Sandown Park) 565 yards	30.13/16	
1961	Bybrae	A Bate	(Sandown Park) 565 yards	30.12/16	
1962	Saskagay	A Ludlow	(Sandown Park) 565 yards	30.8/16	
1963	Saskaview	A Ludlow	(Sandown Park) 565 yards	30.10/16	
1964	Rocket Streak	Fred Ladd	(Sandown Park) 555 yards	30.6/16	
1965	Kinta’s Son	Bob Bowman	(Sandown Park) 555 yards	30.10/16	
1966	Cheltenham Lass	Paul Hogan	(Sandown Park) 555 yards	30.10/16	
1967	Swan Opal	N Ballinger	(Sandown Park) 555 yards	30.9/16	
1968	Mr Spot	T Rowland	(Sandown Park) 555 yards	30.9/16	
1969	Milimsimbi	Stan Cleverley	(Sandown Park) 555 yards	30.7/16	
1970	Chris Dandy	Alex Kay	(Sandown Park) 555 yards	31.1/16	
1971	Gerard The Gent	Herb Skiewa	(Sandown Park) 555 yards	30.7/16	
1972	Gold Grotto	Ed Tucker	(Sandown Park) 555 yards	30.6/16	
1973	New Mariner	R Jennings	(Sandown Park) 513 metres	31.49	
1974	Kwik Metal	Cap Abbott	(Sandown Park) 513 metres	31.02	
1975	Dynamic Dean	Paul Hogan	(Sandown Park) 513 metres	31.32	
1976	Carrington Jade	K Murphy	(Sandown Park) 513 metres	30.70	
1977	Milepost	Tony Collins	(Sandown Park) 513 metres	30.94	
1978	Tangaloa	Joe Hilli	(Sandown Park) 513 metres	30.97	
1979	Acclaim Star	W A Fletcher	(Sandown Park) 513 metres	30.50	
1980	Black Aztec	H Sarkis	(Sandown Park) 513 metres	30.74	
1981	Satan's Shroud	Graeme Bate	(Sandown Park) 513 metres	30.88	
1982	Kid Scandal	Reg Johnson	(Sandown Park) 513 metres	30.70	
1983	Lady Lilly	Colin Kelly	(Sandown Park) 513 metres	30.86	
1984	Rustic Venture	Peter Denro	(Sandown Park) 513 metres	30.92	
1985	Sydney Dingaan	Ned Bryant	(Sandown Park) 513 metres	30.44	
1986	Legendary Kid	Jim Coleman	(Sandown Park) 511 metres	30.62	
1987	Speedy Mick	J Schroeders	(Sandown Park) 511 metres	30.52	
1988	Hua	R Symes	(Sandown Park) 511 metres	30.01	
1989	Fair Sentence	Graeme Bate	(Sandown Park) 511 metres	30.19	
1990	Highly Blessed	Doug Ferrermi	(Sandown Park) 511 metres	30.53	
1991	Fox Hunt	Peter Jovanovic	(Sandown Park) 511 metres	30.50	
1992	Master Giant	Peter Akathiotis	(Sandown Park) 511 metres	30.30	
1993	Silver Chisel	J Fleming	(Sandown Park) 511 metres	30.25	
1994	Light Of Fire	Jason Thompson	(Sandown Park) 511 metres	30.05	
1995	City Blitz	P Giles	(Sandown Park) 511 metres	30.06	
1996	Henry Hand	D Dean	(Sandown Park) 515 metres	29.86	
1997	Roanokee	R Green	(Sandown Park) 515 metres	29.96	
1998	Rapid Journey	J Curruthers	(Sandown Park) 515 metres	29.91	
1999	Kantarn Bale	Graeme Bate	(Sandown Park) 515 metres	29.73	
2000	Go Wild Teddy	M Bell	(Sandown Park) 515 metres	29.73	
2001	Classic Capri	Judy Jayley	(Sandown Park) 515 metres	29.65	
2002	Excite Ability	Len Poore	(Sandown Park) 515 metres	29.77	
2003	Bombastic Shiraz	Darren Cairns	(Sandown Park) 515 metres	29.82	
2004	Hallucinate	Darren McDonald	(Sandown Park) 515 metres	29.73	
2005	Closing Argument	C Taylor	(Sandown Park) 515 metres	29.94	
2006	Betty's Angel	Paul Bartolo	(Sandown Park) 515 metres	29.51	
2007	Shanlyn Prince	Darren McDonald	(Sandown Park) 515 metres	29.60	
2008	Surgeon	Darren McDonald	(Sandown Park) 515 metres	29.87	
2009	Lord Ducal	Jon Roberts	(Sandown Park) 515 metres	29.53	
2010	El Grand Senor	Carolyn Jones	(Sandown Park) 515 metres	29.55	
2011	Dyna Tron	Andrea Dailly	(Sandown Park) 515 metres	29.22	
2012	Got A Moment	Jason Thompson	(Sandown Park) 515 metres	29.37	
2013	Black Magic Opal	Jason Thompson	(Sandown Park) 515 metres	29.37	
2014	Dyna Villa	Jenny Hunt	(Sandown Park) 515 metres	29.36	
2015	Dyna Double One	Andrea Dailly	(Sandown Park) 515 metres	29.16	
2016	Ando's Mac	Jason Mackay	(Sandown Park) 515 metres	29.48	
2017	Aston Dee Bee	Seona Thompson	(Sandown Park) 515 metres	29.36	
2018	My Redeemer	David Geall	(Sandown Park) 515 metres	29.38	
2019	Whiskey Riot	Anthony Azzopardi	(Sandown Park) 515 metres	29.44	
2020	Hard Style Rico	Luckie Karabitsakos	(Sandown Park) 515 metres	28.91	(track record)
2021	Koblenz	David Geall	(Sandown Park) 515 metres	29.40	
2022	Yachi Bale	Mark Delbridge	(Sandown Park) 515 metres	29.21	
2023	Aussie Rocks	Geoff Mitchell	(Sandown Park) 515 metres	29.55	1st Tasmanian winner
2024	Explicit	Jason Thompson	(Sandown Park) 515 metres	29.29	
2025	Canya Mayhem	Jessica Hopkins	(Sandown Park) 515 metres	29.15	

== Conditions ==
The final of the Melbourne Cup involves the winners of eight heats conducted the previous week. In order for a greyhound to qualify for the heats, it must win an 'exemption race' - a Group 1 sprint race, a Victorian country cup (except the Healesville Cup) or a group race at Sandown Park 515m - in the 12 months preceding the Melbourne Cup final.

The previous year's Melbourne Cup winner and all finalists in the 'Shootout,' a four-dog winner-takes-all event the week prior to the Melbourne Cup heats, also qualify for the Melbourne Cup heats, as do the winners of a Melbourne Cup Prelude. Melbourne Cup Preludes were first conducted in 1995.

Melbourne Cup Preludes are conducted every two weeks, with the final Prelude series conducted on the same night as the Shootout. Remaining places in the Melbourne Cup heats are awarded to the best performed greyhounds that have competed in at least one Melbourne Cup Prelude series.

=== Most wins by trainers ===
Three-time winners:

- Graeme Bate: Satan's Shroud (1981), Fair Sentence (1989), Kantarn Bale (1999)
- Darren McDonald: Hallucinate (2004), Shanlyn Prince (2007), Surgeon (2008)
- Jason Thompson: Light Of Fire (1994), Got A Moment (2012), Black Magic Opal (2013)

=== Race Records ===
- Fastest time - 28.909 (track record) by Hard Style Rico, 2020
- Biggest margin - 9 lengths (Fox Hunt, 1991)
- Smallest margin - Nose (Whiskey Riot, 2019)
- Longest priced winner - Classic Capri, $25.90 (2001)
- Shortest priced winner - Gold Grotto, 2/1 on ($1.50) (1972)
- First Tasmanian Winner - Aussie Rocks, (2023)

== See also ==
- Greyhound racing in Australia
