= Greyhound Racing Victoria =

Statutory authority in Australia

- Sport: Greyhound racing
- Jurisdiction: Victoria
- Abbreviation: GRV
- Founded: 1954
- Location: 1/46-50 Chetwynd St, West Melbourne VIC 3003
- Chairperson: Thomas Salom
- Board members: John (Jack) Blayney (Deputy Chair); Biagio Buccilli; Carly Dixon; Andrew Giddy; Lisa Tripodi
- CEO: Stuart Laing
- Sponsor: Sportsbet

Official website
- www.grv.org.au

Greyhound Racing Victoria (GRV) is a public body, set up by statute in 1954, to control the sport of greyhound racing in the Australian state of Victoria. GRV promotes, regulates, and provides dog registration services, as well assisting in strategic research and planning. Animal welfare and rehoming of retired greyhounds are part of GRV's remit. The organisation has been challenged on some of its activities, in particular in the aftermath of the 2015 Australian greyhound racing live baiting scandal and welfare concerns.
