= List of Australia men's international soccer players =

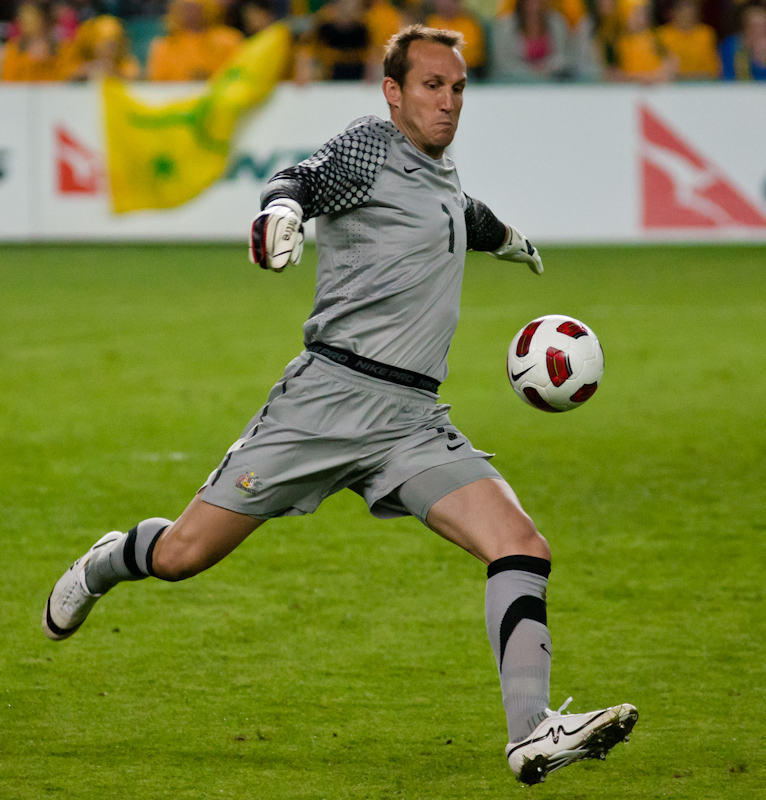
Mark Schwarzer is Australia's most capped player.

The Australia men's national soccer team represents the country of Australia in international association football. It is fielded by Football Australia, the governing body of soccer in Australia, and competes as a member of the Asian Football Confederation (AFC), which encompasses the countries of Asia, having previously been a part of the Oceania Football Confederation (OFC), which encompasses the countries of Oceania. Australia competed in their first match on 17 June 1922, a 3–1 loss with New Zealand at Carisbrook Park.

== Introduction ==
Australia's number 1 cap was Alex Gibb, who was one of the 11 to play in Australia's first ever match, against New Zealand on 17 June 1922. The appearance record is held by goalkeeper Mark Schwarzer, which he set on 22 January 2011 in a 1–0 win with Iraq in the 2014 FIFA World Cup qualifying. Schwarzer's last match for Australia was against Brazil on 7 September 2013 in a friendly, finishing his Australia career on 109 caps.

The goalscoring record is held by Tim Cahill, with 50 goals in 108 matches, scored between 2004 and 2018. He set the record with his 29th goal on 19 November 2013, in a 1–0 win over Costa Rica in a friendly. Australia's second highest goalscorer is Damian Mori, with 29 goals from 45 matches, who held the record for almost 13 years before being surpassed by Cahill in 2014.

== Key ==
Player
This colour background and the * symbol indicate that the player was active at professional club level as at the date specified above.

Positions key
pre–1960s		1960s–present	
GK	Goalkeeper		
FB	Full back	DF	Defender
HB	Half back	MF	Midfielder
FW	Forward		

Position
Playing positions are listed according to the tactical formations that were employed at the time. Thus the change in the names of defensive and midfield positions reflects the tactical evolution that occurred from the 1960s onwards.
Caps and goals
Caps and goals comprise those in the FIFA World Cup and AFC Asian Cup, their associated qualification matches, as well as OFC Nations Cup matches and international friendly tournaments and matches.

== Players ==
Australia have competed in numerous competitions, and all players who have appeared for the country either as a member of the starting eleven or as a substitute, are listed below. Each player's details include his cap number, playing position while with the team, the number of caps earned and goals scored in all international matches, and details of the first and most recent matches played in. The names are initially ordered by number of caps (in descending order), then by cap number.

All statistics are correct up to and including the match played against Jordan on 17 November 2026.

Australia men's national soccer team players
Cap	Player	Pos.	Caps	Goals	Debut		Last or most recent match		Ref.
Cap	Player	Pos.	Caps	Goals	Date	Opponent	Date	Opponent	Ref.
397	Mark Schwarzer	GK	109	0	31 July 1993	Canada	7 September 2013	Brazil	
476	Tim Cahill	FW	108	50	30 March 2004	South Africa	20 November 2018	Lebanon	
555	Mathew Ryan *	GK	105	0	5 December 2012	North Korea	3 July 2026	Egypt	
421	Lucas Neill	DF	96	1	9 October 1996	Saudi Arabia	19 November 2013	Costa Rica	
433	Brett Emerton	MF	95	20	7 February 1998	Chile	9 December 2012	Chinese Taipei	
547	Aziz Behich *	DF	91	3	14 November 2012	South Korea	17 November 2026	Jordan	
568	Jackson Irvine *	MF	88	14	15 October 2013	Canada	29 September 2026	Brazil	
351	Alex Tobin	DF	87	2	9 March 1988	Chinese Taipei	6 November 1999	United States	
337	Paul Wade	MF	84	10	3 August 1986	Czechoslovakia	23 November 1986	China	
461	Mark Bresciano	MF	84	13	1 June 2001	France	17 January 2015	China	
550	Mathew Leckie *	FW	82	14	14 November 2012	South Korea	19 June 2026	United States	
481	Luke Wilkshire	DF	80	8	9 October 2004	Solomon Islands	26 May 2014	South Africa	
494	Mark Milligan	DF	80	6	7 June 2006	Liechtenstein	10 October 2019	Nepal	
509	Mile Jedinak	MF	79	20	22 March 2008	Singapore	26 June 2018	Peru	
376	Tony Vidmar	DF	76	3	6 February 1991	Czechoslovakia	7 October 2006	Paraguay	
542	Robbie Kruse	FW	75	5	5 January 2011	United Arab Emirates	26 January 2019	United Arab Emirates	
439	Scott Chipperfield	MF	68	12	25 September 1998	Fiji	23 June 2010	Serbia	
216	Peter Wilson	DF	65	3	4 November 1970	Iran	13 June 1979	New Zealand	
191	Attila Abonyi	FW	61	25	4 June 1967	Scotland	25 November 1977	Iran	
259	John Kosmina	FW	60	25	18 August 1976	Hong Kong	22 September 1988	Nigeria	
394	Stan Lazaridis	MF	60	0	15 April 1993	Kuwait	7 October 2006	Paraguay	
372	Milan Ivanovic	DF	59	0	30 January 1991	Czechoslovakia	15 February 1998	Japan	
498	Matt McKay	MF	59	2	16 August 2006	Kuwait	27 May 2016	England	
407	Tony Popovic	DF	58	8	8 February 1995	Colombia	7 October 2006	Paraguay	
415	Harry Kewell	FW	58	17	23 April 1996	Chile	8 June 2012	Oman	
483	Jason Culina	MF	58	1	9 February 2005	South Africa	14 January 2011	South Korea	
223	Jimmy Rooney	FW	57	3	11 November 1971	Israel	18 June 1980	Northern Ireland	
558	Aaron Mooy	MF	57	7	7 December 2012	Guam	3 December 2022	Argentina	
574	Trent Sainsbury *	DF	57	4	4 September 2014	Belgium	27 January 2022	Vietnam	
585	Milos Degenek *	DF	57	1	27 May 2016	England	7 June 2026	Switzerland	
334	Graham Arnold	FW	56	19	23 October 1985	Chinese Taipei	29 November 1997	Iran	
428	John Aloisi	FW	55	27	25 September 1994	Kuwait	6 February 2008	Qatar	
386	Zeljko Kalac	GK	54	0	11 August 1992	Malaysia	7 October 2006	Paraguay	
456	Archie Thompson	FW	54	28	28 February 2001	Colombia	7 September 2013	Brazil	
548	Tom Rogic	MF	53	9	14 November 2012	South Korea	1 February 2022	Oman	
409	Craig Moore	DF	52	3	21 June 1995	Ghana	19 June 2010	Ghana	
500	Carl Valeri	MF	52	1	24 March 2007	China	8 September 2014	Saudi Arabia	
292	Alan Davidson	DF	51	2	9 February 1980	Czechoslovakia	6 February 1991	Czechoslovakia	
429	Josip Skoko	MF	51	9	12 March 1997	North Macedonia	11 September 2007	Argentina	
559	Mitchell Duke *	FW	50	13	20 July 2013	South Korea	15 October 2025	United States	
198	Manfred Schaefer	DF	49	0	5 November 1967	New Zealand	22 June 1974	Chile	
325	Charlie Yankos	DF	49	7	12 June 1983	England	16 April 1989	Israel	
184	Ray Baartz	FW	48	18	28 May 1967	Scotland	27 April 1974	Uruguay	
491	David Carney	MF	48	6	22 February 2006	Bahrain	15 October 2013	Canada	
406	Kevin Muscat	DF	46	10	24 September 1994	Kuwait	16 August 2006	Kuwait	
473	Vince Grella	MF	46	0	12 February 2003	England	13 June 2010	Germany	
606	Harry Souttar *	DF	46	11	10 October 2019	Nepal	17 November 2026	Jordan	
390	Damian Mori	FW	45	29	14 September 1992	Solomon Islands	14 July 2002	New Zealand	
571	Massimo Luongo *	MF	45	6	5 March 2014	Ecuador	16 November 2023	Bangladesh	
324	Graham Jennings	DF	44	0	12 June 1983	England	19 March 1989	Israel	
362	Mehmet Durakovic	DF	44	4	25 August 1990	Indonesia	14 July 2002	New Zealand	
373	Aurelio Vidmar	MF	44	17	30 January 1991	Czechoslovakia	25 November 2001	Uruguay	
611	Connor Metcalfe *	MF	44	3	7 June 2021	Chinese Taipei	17 November 2026	Jordan	
402	Mark Viduka	FW	43	11	8 June 1994	South Africa	21 May 2007	Japan	
453	Mile Sterjovski	FW	43	8	15 November 2000	Scotland	3 March 2010	Indonesia	
183	Johnny Warren	FW	42	6	1 October 1955	South Africa	14 June 1974	East Germany	
466	Jade North	MF	41	0	6 July 2002	Vanuatu	25 July 2013	Japan	
561	Tomi Juric *	FW	41	8	20 July 2013	South Korea	20 November 2018	Lebanon	
599	Martin Boyle *	FW	41	10	17 November 2018	South Korea	27 March 2026	Cameroon	
205	Adrian Alston	FW	39	7	20 July 1969	Greece	25 November 1977	Iran	
311	Oscar Crino	MF	39	6	30 August 1981	Indonesia	16 April 1989	Israel	
358	Paul Trimboli	FW	39	14	3 December 1988	Fiji	12 July 2002	Tahiti	
589	Ajdin Hrustic *	MF	39	4	13 June 2017	Brazil	3 July 2026	Egypt	
609	Riley McGree *	MF	39	2	3 June 2021	Kuwait	17 November 2026	Jordan	
355	Warren Spink	FW	38	9	12 October 1988	New Zealand	25 January 1997	Norway	
597	Awer Mabil *	FW	38	10	15 October 2018	Kuwait	3 July 2026	Egypt	
329	Frank Farina	FW	37	10	3 November 1984	China	18 June 1995	Ghana	
333	Jeff Olver	GK	37	0	27 September 1985	China	16 April 1989	Israel	
365	Ernie Tapai	MF	37	6	25 August 1990	Indonesia	25 September 1998	Fiji	
511	James Troisi	MF	37	5	22 March 2008	Singapore	27 March 2018	Colombia	
629	Aiden O'Neill *	MF	37	0	24 March 2023	Ecuador	29 September 2026	Brazil	
233	Doug Utjesenovic	DF	36	2	9 October 1972	New Zealand	3 November 1976	Israel	
245	Gary Byrne	MF	36	1	6 August 1975	China	27 February 1983	New Zealand	
492	Joshua Kennedy	MF	36	17	7 June 2006	Liechtenstein	26 May 2014	South Africa	
515	Matthew Spiranovic	DF	36	0	23 May 2008	Ghana	31 August 2017	Japan	
375	Ned Zelic	MF	33	3	6 February 1991	Czechoslovakia	21 December 1997	Brazil	
238	Murray Barnes	MF	32	6	6 August 1975	China	14 August 1981	Fiji	
239	Col Bennett	DF	32	1	6 August 1975	China	18 June 1978	Greece	
348	Mike Petersen	MF	32	1	26 February 1988	Chinese Taipei	20 September 1992	Tahiti	
393	Steve Corica	FW	32	5	15 April 1993	Kuwait	16 August 2006	Kuwait	
562	Craig Goodwin *	MF	32	7	25 July 2013	Japan	15 November 2025	Venezuela	
584	Jamie Maclaren *	FW	32	11	27 May 2016	England	21 November 2023	Palestine	
199	Ray Richards	MF	31	5	5 November 1967	New Zealand	22 June 1974	Chile	
213	Jimmy Mackay	FW	31	5	4 November 1970	Iran	22 June 1974	New Zealand	
235	Peter Ollerton	FW	31	15	25 April 1974	Uruguay	25 November 1977	Iran	
403	Steve Horvat	FW	31	1	12 June 1994	South Africa	14 July 2002	New Zealand	
632	Jordan Bos *	DF	31	4	28 March 2023	Ecuador	3 July 2026	Egypt	
197	Billy Vojtek	FW	30	6	5 November 1967	New Zealand	18 August 1973	Iran	
425	David Zdrilic	FW	30	20	18 January 1997	New Zealand	29 March 2005	Indonesia	
307	Dave Mitchell	FW	29	11	10 June 1981	Chinese Taipei	15 June 1983	England	
419	Craig Foster	MF	29	0	14 September 1996	Ghana	28 June 2000	New Zealand	
576	Bailey Wright *	DF	29	2	8 September 2014	Saudi Arabia	28 March 2023	Ecuador	
622	Kye Rowles *	DF	29	1	1 June 2022	Jordan	31 March 2026	Curaçao	
633	Cameron Burgess *	DF	29	0	9 September 2023	Mexico	19 June 2026	United States	
222	George Harris	DF	28	0	11 November 1971	Israel	18 June 1978	Greece	
353	Robbie Slater	MF	28	1	7 June 1988	Brazil	16 December 1997	Saudi Arabia	
357	Jason Polak	MF	28	2	3 December 1988	Fiji	1 November 1996	Tahiti	
377	Paul Okon	MF	28	0	6 February 1991	Czechoslovakia	7 September 2003	Jamaica	
538	Tommy Oar	MF	28	2	3 March 2010	Indonesia	17 November 2015	Bangladesh	
164	Stan Ackerley	DF	27	0	21 November 1965	North Korea	14 December 1969	Israel	
200	Ron Corry	GK	27	0	11 November 1967	Singapore	16 March 1973	New Zealand	
278	Tony Henderson	DF	27	2	13 June 1979	New Zealand	15 December 1983	South Korea	
367	Jason van Blerk	DF	27	1	25 August 1990	Indonesia	12 June 2000	Paraguay	
366	Robert Zabica	GK	27	0	25 August 1990	Indonesia	22 May 1994	Japan	
436	Simon Colosimo	DF	26	3	25 September 1998	Fiji	3 March 2010	Indonesia	
489	Scott McDonald	FW	26	0	22 February 2006	Bahrain	15 August 2012	Scotland	
247	John Nyskohus	DF	25	1	9 October 1972	New Zealand	18 June 1980	Northern Ireland	
332	Robbie Dunn	DF	25	2	21 September 1985	New Zealand	22 September 1988	Nigeria	
504	Nathan Burns	FW	24	3	30 June 2007	Singapore	15 November 2016	Thailand	
174	Johnny Watkiss	MF	23	3	21 November 1965	North Korea	28 October 1973	South Korea	
236	Dave Harding	MF	23	2	25 April 1974	Uruguay	13 November 1977	Singapore	
261	Peter Sharne	FW	23	8	14 August 1977	Iran	14 August 1981	Fiji	
328	Wally Savor	DF	23	0	3 November 1984	China	16 April 1989	Israel	
408	Danny Tiatto	MF	23	1	8 February 1995	Kuwait	9 February 2005	South Africa	
534	Dario Vidošić	MF	23	2	17 June 2009	Japan	6 June 2014	Croatia	
545	Jason Davidson *	DF	23	1	15 August 2012	Scotland	1 June 2022	Jordan	
575	Brad Smith *	DF	23	0	4 September 2014	Belgium	7 September 2021	Vietnam	
643	Nestory Irankunda *	FW	23	8	6 June 2024	Bangladesh	17 November 2026	Jordan	
218	Colin Curran	DF	22	1	4 November 1970	Iran	13 June 1979	New Zealand	
227	Branko Buljevic	FW	22	7	7 October 1972	Indonesia	22 June 1974	Chile	
251	Allan Maher	GK	22	0	3 December 1975	Soviet Union	26 July 1981	Fiji	
487	Michael Beauchamp	DF	22	1	22 February 2006	Bahrain	23 June 2010	Serbia	
540	Sasa Ognenovski	DF	22	1	17 November 2010	Egypt	7 September 2013	Brazil	
546	Ryan McGowan *	DF	22	0	15 August 2012	Scotland	1 February 2022	Oman	
240	Todd Clarke	GK	21	1	6 August 1975	China	18 June 1978	Greece	
256	Phil O'Connor	MF	21	5	11 August 1976	Hong Kong	3 November 1984	China	
319	David Ratcliffe	DF	21	1	6 October 1982	Thailand	3 August 1986	Czechoslovakia	
479	Alex Brosque	FW	21	5	2 June 2004	Fiji	26 March 2013	Oman	
535	Nikita Rukavytsya	FW	21	1	12 August 2009	Republic of Ireland	16 November 2021	China	
553	Adam Taggart *	FW	21	7	3 December 2012	Hong Kong	20 March 2025	Indonesia	
600	Rhyan Grant *	DF	21	1	20 November 2018	Lebanon	24 March 2022	Japan	
628	Keanu Baccus *	MF	21	1	25 September 2022	New Zealand	15 October 2024	Japan	
637	Alessandro Circati *	DF	21	2	18 October 2023	New Zealand	17 November 2026	Jordan	
192	George Keith	DF	20	0	5 November 1967	New Zealand	14 December 1969	Israel	
237	Harry Williams	DF	20	0	21 May 1974	Indonesia	16 October 1977	Kuwait	
243	Agenor Muniz	MF	20	1	6 August 1975	China	13 June 1979	New Zealand	
249	Jim Tansey	DF	20	0	23 November 1975	Soviet Union	20 May 1981	Indonesia	
279	Eddie Krncevic	FW	20	4	13 June 1979	New Zealand	16 April 1989	Israel	
370	Robbie Hooker	DF	20	2	9 September 1990	South Korea	7 February 1998	Chile	
551	Ivan Franjic	DF	20	0	3 December 2012	Hong Kong	16 June 2015	Kyrgyzstan	
586	Jason Geria *	DF	20	0	4 June 2016	Greece	17 November 2026	Jordan	
635	Lewis Miller *	DF	20	2	13 October 2023	England	19 November 2025	Colombia	
193	Tommy McColl	FW	19	8	5 November 1967	New Zealand	4 December 1969	Israel	
263	Gary Cole	MF	19	17	11 June 1978	Greece	14 October 1982	Malaysia	
371	Alistair Edwards	FW	19	3	30 January 1991	Czechoslovakia	22 January 1997	South Korea	
382	Milan Blagojevic	MF	19	0	14 June 1991	South Korea	12 July 2002	Tahiti	
391	Carl Veart	FW	18	7	14 September 1992	Vanuatu	12 June 2000	Paraguay	
401	John Markovski	FW	18	1	26 May 1994	France	15 February 1998	Japan	
418	Paul Agostino	FW	18	7	23 April 1996	Chile	9 February 2005	South Africa	
443	Shaun Murphy	DF	18	3	9 February 2000	Chile	26 November 2001	Uruguay	
464	Patrick Kisnorbo	DF	18	1	6 July 2002	Vanuatu	18 November 2009	Oman	
281	Joe Watson	MF	17	2	13 June 1979	New Zealand	10 August 1986	Czechoslovakia	
395	Mark Bosnich	GK	17	1	30 May 1993	New Zealand	23 February 2000	Hungary	
474	Ahmad Elrich	MF	17	5	18 February 2004	Venezuela	11 October 2006	Bahrain	
508	James Holland	MF	17	0	22 March 2008	Singapore	15 June 2021	Jordan	
519	Richard Garcia	MF	17	2	19 August 2008	South Africa	9 December 2012	Chinese Taipei	
252	Mark Jankovics	FW	16	0	29 February 1976	Hong Kong	15 December 1983	South Korea	
323	Terry Greedy	GK	16	0	12 June 1983	England	4 December 1985	Scotland	
340	Garry McDowall	MF	16	0	6 August 1986	Czechoslovakia	3 December 1988	Fiji	
380	Andrew Marth	MF	16	1	12 May 1991	New Zealand	12 June 2000	Paraguay	
420	Kris Trajanovski	FW	16	10	21 September 1996	Kenya	4 October 1998	New Zealand	
482	Jonathan McKain	DF	16	0	9 October 2004	Solomon Islands	7 June 2011	Serbia	
539	Adam Federici	GK	16	0	24 May 2010	New Zealand	7 June 2016	Greece	
570	Alex Wilkinson	DF	16	0	5 March 2014	Ecuador	17 November 2015	Bangladesh	
580	Chris Ikonomidis *	FW	16	2	30 March 2015	Macedonia	12 October 2021	Japan	
604	Brandon Borrello *	FW	16	2	7 June 2019	South Korea	5 June 2025	Japan	
214	Jack Reilly	GK	15	0	4 November 1970	Iran	22 June 1974	Chile	
225	Ernie Campbell	FW	15	3	21 November 1971	Israel	3 December 1975	Soviet Union	
280	Steve O'Connor	DF	15	0	13 June 1979	New Zealand	20 November 1985	Scotland	
326	Ken Murphy	FW	15	1	15 June 1983	England	3 August 1986	Czechoslovakia	
413	Jason Petkovic	GK	15	0	15 November 1995	New Zealand	6 July 2002	New Zealand	
444	Stephen Laybutt	DF	15	1	9 February 2000	Chile	29 May 2004	New Zealand	
493	Neil Kilkenny	MF	15	0	7 June 2006	Liechtenstein	2 June 2012	Denmark	
601	James Jeggo	MF	15	0	20 November 2018	Lebanon	29 March 2022	Saudi Arabia	
607	Fran Karacic *	DF	15	1	3 June 2021	Kuwait	25 March 2025	China	
94	Cec Drummond	FB	14	0	10 May 1947	South Africa	22 July 1950	South Africa	
186	Alan Marnoch	DF	14	0	28 May 1967	Scotland	14 December 1969	Israel	
188	Alan Westwater	FW	14	2	28 May 1967	Scotland	4 April 1968	Japan	
286	Ivo Prskalo	DF	14	1	27 November 1979	Chinese Taipei	7 December 1980	Indonesia	
306	Peter Katholos	MF	14	2	20 May 1981	Indonesia	18 December 1983	Singapore	
315	Peter Raskopoulos	MF	14	0	30 August 1981	Indonesia	2 September 1987	New Zealand	
330	Ian Gray	DF	14	3	3 November 1984	China	26 September 1992	Solomon Islands	
335	Tom McCulloch	FW	14	1	27 October 1985	Chinese Taipei	4 September 1992	Solomon Islands	
346	Scott Ollerenshaw	FW	14	2	15 November 1987	Chinese Taipei	2 April 1989	New Zealand	
399	Matthew Bingley	MF	14	5	26 September 1993	South Korea	21 December 1997	Brazil	
447	Clayton Zane	FW	14	6	29 March 2000	Czech Republic	20 June 2001	New Zealand	
533	Rhys Williams	DF	14	0	17 June 2009	Japan	19 November 2013	Costa Rica	
655	Paul Okon-Engstler *	MF	14	0	15 November 2025	Venezuela	17 November 2026	Jordan	
97	Joe Marston	HB	13	0	10 May 1947	South Africa	23 August 1958	New Zealand	
228	Bobby Hogg	DF	13	0	7 October 1972	Indonesia	24 March 1973	Indonesia	
273	Steve Perry	DF	13	0	18 June 1978	Greece	20 May 1981	Indonesia	
284	Ken Boden	FW	13	2	27 November 1979	Chinese Taipei	6 September 1981	New Zealand	
291	John Yzendoorn	DF	13	1	9 February 1980	Czechoslovakia	20 May 1981	Indonesia	
304	Steve Blair	DF	13	0	25 April 1981	New Zealand	27 February 1983	New Zealand	
331	Žarko Odžakov	MF	13	3	21 September 1985	New Zealand	15 November 1987	Chinese Taipei	
361	Andrew Bernal	DF	13	0	25 August 1990	Indonesia	24 April 1996	Chile	
431	Fausto De Amicis	DF	13	2	7 February 1998	Chile	14 July 2002	New Zealand	
475	Nick Carle	MF	13	0	18 February 2004	Venezuela	29 February 2012	Saudi Arabia	
485	Michael Thwaite	DF	13	0	9 October 2005	Jamaica	25 July 2013	Japan	
620	Nathaniel Atkinson *	DF	13	0	29 March 2022	Saudi Arabia	21 March 2024	Lebanon	
636	Mohamed Toure *	FW	13	2	13 October 2023	England	3 July 2026	Egypt	
638	Kusini Yengi *	FW	13	6	16 November 2023	Bangladesh	17 November 2026	Jordan	
113	Kevin O'Neill	HB	12	0	14 June 1950	Southern Rhodesia	23 August 1958	New Zealand	
378	Greg Brown	FW	12	1	12 May 1991	New Zealand	5 July 1992	Solomon Islands	
438	Kasey Wehrman	MF	12	0	25 September 1998	Fiji	14 November 2006	Ghana	
583	Apostolos Giannou	FW	12	3	4 June 2016	Greece	10 October 2019	Nepal	
596	Daniel Arzani *	MF	12	1	1 June 2018	Czech Republic	17 November 2026	Jordan	
51	Jack Evans	FB	11	0	5 June 1933	New Zealand	1 October 1938	India	
89	Norman Conquest	GK	11	0	10 May 1947	South Africa	22 July 1950	South Africa	
110	Bunny Nunn	FW	11	7	4 September 1948	New Zealand	23 August 1958	New Zealand	
112	Tom Jack	HB	11	0	14 June 1950	Southern Rhodesia	17 September 1955	South Africa	
260	Gary Marocchi	FW	11	0	20 October 1976	Indonesia	14 June 1978	Greece	
282	Greg Woodhouse	GK	11	0	13 June 1979	New Zealand	16 May 1981	New Zealand	
369	Branko Milosevic	MF	11	1	6 September 1990	South Korea	26 September 1993	South Korea	
441	Hayden Foxe	DF	11	2	6 November 1998	United States	19 August 2003	Republic of Ireland	
454	Jacob Burns	MF	11	0	15 November 2000	Scotland	3 March 2010	Indonesia	
641	Patrick Yazbek *	MF	11	0	26 March 2024	Lebanon	29 September 2026	Brazil	
653	Jacob Italiano *	DF	11	0	11 October 2025	Canada	17 November 2026	Jordan	
2	George Cartwright	GK	10	0	17 June 1922	New Zealand	26 July 1924	Canada	
53	Jimmy McNabb	GK	10	0	5 June 1933	New Zealand	24 September 1938	India	
105	Allan Johns	FW	10	6	14 August 1948	New Zealand	22 July 1950	South Africa	
106	Bob Lawrie	HB	10	1	11 September 1948	New Zealand	22 July 1950	South Africa	
166	Archie Blue	FW	10	4	21 November 1965	North Korea	4 April 1968	Japan	
268	George Christopoulos	MF	10	1	11 June 1978	Greece	27 February 1983	New Zealand	
314	Jim Patikas	FW	10	2	30 August 1981	Indonesia	23 March 1988	New Zealand	
343	Andrew Zinni	FW	10	3	25 October 1986	New Zealand	6 February 1991	Czechoslovakia	
528	Michael Zullo	DF	10	0	28 January 2009	Indonesia	6 February 2013	Romania	
592	Andrew Nabbout *	FW	10	2	23 March 2018	Norway	11 November 2021	Saudi Arabia	
616	Marco Tilio *	FW	10	0	27 January 2022	Vietnam	11 June 2025	Saudi Arabia	
645	Nishan Velupillay *	FW	10	3	10 October 2024	China	29 September 2026	Brazil	
654	Patrick Beach *	GK	10	0	15 November 2025	Venezuela	17 November 2026	Jordan	
658	Lucas Herrington *	DF	10	0	27 March 2026	Cameroon	17 November 2026	Jordan	
8	William Maunder	FW	9	6	17 June 1922	New Zealand	12 July 1924	Canada	
114	Harry Robertson	FW	9	2	14 June 1950	Rhodesia	4 September 1954	New Zealand	
167	Pat Hughes	DF	9	0	21 November 1965	North Korea	3 June 1967	Scotland	
171	Nigel Shepherd	DF	9	0	21 November 1965	North Korea	3 June 1967	Scotland	
196	Dick van Alphen	DF	9	0	5 November 1967	New Zealand	4 April 1968	Japan	
287	Martyn Crook	GK	9	0	27 November 1979	Taiwan	27 February 1983	New Zealand	
354	Gary van Egmond	DF	9	0	20 September 1988	Brazil	16 April 1989	Israel	
405	Gabriel Mendez	MF	9	0	24 September 1994	Kuwait	12 June 2000	Paraguay	
414	Goran Lozanovski	MF	9	0	10 February 1996	Japan	4 October 1998	New Zealand	
512	Bruce Djite	FW	9	0	22 March 2008	Singapore	11 August 2010	Slovenia	
10	Tom Thompson		8	0	17 June 1922	New Zealand	26 July 1924	Canada	
77	Lex Gibb	HB	8	0	10 September 1938	India	14 August 1948	New Zealand	
91	Jim Cunningham		8	6	10 May 1947	South Africa	11 September 1948	New Zealand	
99	Ron Hughes		8	0	24 May 1947	South Africa	11 September 1949	New Zealand	
100	Bill Wilson		8	0	24 May 1947	South Africa	24 September 1955	South Africa	
127	Bob Bignall	FB	8	0	28 August 1954	New Zealand	12 December 1956	India	
130	Cliff Sander	MF	8	0	28 August 1954	New Zealand	12 December 1956	India	
134	Frank Loughran	MF	8	2	3 September 1955	South Africa	23 August 1958	New Zealand	
234	Jimmy Fraser	GK	8	0	18 February 1973	Bulgaria	13 November 1973	South Korea	
309	Alan Niven	DF	8	0	26 June 1981	Fiji	27 February 1983	New Zealand	
396	Dominic Longo	DF	8	0	30 May 1993	New Zealand	4 October 1998	New Zealand	
410	Joe Spiteri	FW	8	2	24 June 1995	Ghana	6 June 1998	Croatia	
424	Mark Babic	DF	8	0	18 January 1997	New Zealand	4 October 1998	New Zealand	
426	Luke Casserly	DF	8	0	18 January 1997	New Zealand	15 August 2001	Japan	
520	Eugene Galekovic	GK	8	0	28 January 2009	Indonesia	25 July 2013	Japan	
566	Mitchell Langerak	GK	8	0	11 October 2013	France	13 June 2017	Brazil	
631	Joe Gauci *	GK	8	0	28 March 2023	Ecuador	9 September 2025	New Zealand	
634	Samuel Silvera *	FW	8	0	9 September 2023	Mexico	5 September 2025	New Zealand	
49	Roy Crowhurst		7	2	5 June 1933	New Zealand	24 September 1938	India	
64	Jimmy Osborne		7	0	24 June 1933	New Zealand	24 September 1938	India	
71	Jim Wilkinson		7	3	4 July 1936	New Zealand	1 October 1938	India	
107	Frank Parsons	FW	7	15	14 August 1947	New Zealand	22 July 1950	South Africa	
176	Billy Cook	DF	7	0	24 November 1965	North Korea	31 May 1967	Scotland	
206	Danny Walsh		7	0	20 July 1969	Greece	14 December 1969	Israel	
338	Chris Kalantzis	MF	7	1	3 August 1986	Czechoslovakia	21 June 1987	South Korea	
342	Alan Hunter	DF	7	0	6 August 1986	Czechoslovakia	23 March 1988	New Zealand	
352	Vlado Bozinovski	MF	7	1	7 July 1988	Brazil	21 June 1992	Uruguay	
423	Robert Enes	MF	7	0	28 October 1996	Tahiti	17 June 1997	Solomon Islands	
516	Chris Coyne	DF	7	0	7 June 2008	Iraq	10 June 2009	Bahrain	
567	Oliver Bozanic	MF	7	0	15 October 2013	Canada	30 March 2015	Macedonia	
618	Bruno Fornaroli *	FW	7	0	24 March 2022	Japan	2 February 2024	South Korea	
656	Kai Trewin *	DF	7	0	15 November 2025	Venezuela	3 July 2026	Egypt	
661	Tete Yengi *	FW	7	2	7 June 2026	Switzerland	17 November 2026	Jordan	
1	Alex Gibb	HB	6	0	17 June 1922	New Zealand	30 June 1923	New Zealand	
11	Dave Ward		6	5	17 June 1922	New Zealand	26 July 1924	Canada	
24	Judy Masters	FW	6	5	30 June 1923	New Zealand	26 July 1924	Canada	
48	Alec Cameron	FW	6	6	5 June 1933	New Zealand	18 July 1936	New Zealand	
56	Jock Parkes		6	0	5 June 1933	New Zealand	24 September 1938	India	
57	George Smith	FW	6	16	5 June 1933	New Zealand	18 July 1936	New Zealand	
59	Jack Hughes		6	10	17 June 1933	New Zealand	1 October 1938	India	
111	Eric Hulme		6	4	14 June 1950	Rhodesia	22 July 1950	South Africa	
117	Bob Young		6	0	14 June 1950	Rhodesia	22 July 1950	South Africa	
128	Bill Henderson	GK	6	0	28 August 1954	New Zealand	12 December 1956	India	
129	Jack Lennard		6	1	28 August 1954	New Zealand	12 December 1956	India	
170	Les Scheinflug		6	4	21 November 1965	North Korea	4 April 1968	Japan	
194	Frank Micic	MF	6	1	5 November 1967	New Zealand	21 November 1971	Israel	
173	Dave Todd		6	1	21 November 1965	North Korea	8 December 1965	Malaysia	
175	Roy Blitz	FW	6	0	24 November 1965	North Korea	4 April 1968	Japan	
182	Hamilton McMeechan		6	0	26 November 1965	Cambodia	31 March 1968	Japan	
195	Roger Romanowicz		6	0	5 November 1967	New Zealand	21 November 1971	Israel	
210	Willie Rutherford	FW	6	1	20 October 1969	South Korea	14 December 1969	Israel	
322	Jimmy Cant	MF	6	1	12 June 1983	England	18 December 1983	Singapore	
437	Brad Maloney	MF	6	2	25 September 1998	Fiji	15 February 2000	Bulgaria	
432	Troy Halpin	MF	6	1	7 February 1998	Chile	4 October 1998	New Zealand	
435	Alvin Ceccoli	DF	6	1	25 September 1998	Fiji	16 August 2006	Kuwait	
455	Michael Petkovic	GK	6	0	28 February 2001	Colombia	22 June 2008	China	
458	Angelo Costanzo	DF	6	1	28 February 2001	Colombia	14 July 2002	New Zealand	
465	Ante Milicic	FW	6	5	6 July 2002	Vanuatu	29 March 2005	Indonesia	
467	Tom Pondeljak	MF	6	0	6 July 2002	Vanuatu	5 March 2009	Kuwait	
477	Max Vieri	FW	6	0	21 May 2004	Turkey	9 February 2005	South Africa	
484	Ljubo Milicevic	DF	6	0	29 March 2005	Indonesia	6 September 2006	Kuwait	
502	Brad Jones	GK	6	0	2 June 2007	Uruguay	9 June 2018	Hungary	
572	Ben Halloran *	MF	6	0	26 May 2014	South Africa	4 September 2014	Belgium	
610	Denis Genreau *	MF	6	0	7 June 2021	Chinese Taipei	9 September 2023	Mexico	
624	Ryan Strain *	DF	6	0	25 September 2022	New Zealand	6 June 2024	Bangladesh	
639	Gethin Jones *	DF	6	0	6 January 2024	Bahrain	11 June 2024	Palestine	
26	Gilbert Storey	HB	5	0	30 June 1923	New Zealand	12 July 1924	Canada	
92	Reg Date	FW	5	8	10 May 1947	South Africa	14 June 1947	South Africa	
98	Charlie Stewart		5	3	10 May 1947	South Africa	1 October 1955	South Africa	
155	Bruce Morrow		5	0	27 November 1956	Japan	4 June 1967	Scotland	
168	Billy Rice		5	0	21 November 1965	North Korea	26 July 1969	Greece	
203	Ray Lloyd		5	0	21 November 1967	Singapore	26 July 1969	Greece	
262	David Jones		5	0	13 November 1977	Singapore	9 February 1980	Czechoslovakia	
300	Jim Muir	FW	5	0	20 February 1980	England	24 August 1980	Mexico	
308	Robert Wheatley	DF	5	0	10 June 1981	Taiwan	2 November 1986	New Zealand	
321	Marshall Soper	FW	5	0	22 February 1983	New Zealand	10 August 1986	Czechoslovakia	
350	Andrew Koczka	MF	5	0	9 March 1988	Taiwan	2 April 1989	New Zealand	
499	Ryan Griffiths	FW	5	0	9 October 2005	Jamaica	22 March 2008	Singapore	
530	Mitch Nichols	MF	5	0	25 March 2009	Kuwait	18 November 2014	Japan	
564	Joshua Brillante *	MF	5	0	28 July 2013	China	14 October 2014	Qatar	
598	Thomas Deng *	DF	5	0	15 October 2018	Kuwait	10 October 2024	China	
608	Kenneth Dougall *	FW	5	0	3 June 2021	Kuwait	1 June 2022	Jordan	
625	Cameron Devlin *	MF	5	0	25 September 2022	New Zealand	7 June 2026	Switzerland	
627	Garang Kuol *	FW	5	1	25 September 2022	New Zealand	28 March 2023	Ecuador	
652	Max Balard *	MF	5	1	5 September 2025	New Zealand	19 November 2025	Colombia	
6	Peter Doyle	DF	4	0	17 June 1922	New Zealand	30 June 1923	New Zealand	
32	Tommy Oliver	DF	4	0	7 June 1924	Canada	26 July 1924	Canada	
37	Harry Spurway	DF	4	0	14 June 1924	Canada	26 July 1924	Canada	
66	Ray Bryant		4	1	4 July 1936	New Zealand	24 September 1938	India	
95	Alec Heaney		4	0	10 May 1947	South Africa	24 September 1938	India	
104	Ken Hough (Note: Also has been capped for New Zealand (5 caps in 1958).)	GK	4	0	14 August 1947	New Zealand	11 September 1948	New Zealand	
115	George Sanders		4	2	14 June 1950	Rhodesia	1 September 1950	South Africa	
150	John Pettigrew		4	0	1 October 1955	South Africa	12 December 1956	India	
152	Alwyn Warren		4	0	1 October 1955	South Africa	12 December 1956	India	
208	Garry Manuel	FW	4	0	10 October 1969	Japan	28 May 1975	Israel	
211	George Blues	MF	4	1	4 November 1970	Iran	1 December 1970	Mexico	
212	Mike Denton		4	0	4 November 1970	Iran	1 December 1970	Mexico	
215	John Roche	DF	4	0	4 November 1970	Iran	1 December 1970	Mexico	
221	Alan Ainslie	FW	4	1	11 November 1971	Israel	11 August 1976	Hong Kong	
283	Arno Bertogna	MF	4	0	27 November 1979	Taiwan	11 November 1980	Greece	
288	John Coyne	FW	4	0	27 November 1979	Taiwan	24 August 1980	Mexico	
285	Tommy Cumming	FW	4	1	27 November 1979	Taiwan	9 February 1980	Czechoslovakia	
290	Jim Campbell		4	1	27 January 1980	Czechoslovakia	18 December 1983	Singapore	
295	Steve Hogg	DF	4	0	26 February 1980	Papua New Guinea	7 December 1980	Indonesia	
336	Ange Postecoglou	DF	4	0	3 August 1986	Czechoslovakia	16 October 1988	New Zealand	
364	Kimon Taliadoros	FW	4	0	25 August 1990	Indonesia	26 September 1993	South Korea	
387	Abbas Saad	MF	4	0	11 August 1992	Malaysia	15 February 1998	Japan	
445	Pablo Cardozo	FW	4	1	12 February 2000	Slovakia	23 June 2000	Solomon Islands	
449	Clint Bolton	GK	4	0	12 June 2000	Paraguay	16 August 2006	Kuwait	
468	Bobby Despotovski	FW	4	5	6 July 2002	Vanuatu	14 July 2002	New Zealand	
471	Ante Juric	DF	4	1	8 July 2002	New Caledonia	14 July 2002	New Zealand	
472	Joel Porter	FW	4	5	8 July 2002	New Caledonia	14 July 2002	New Zealand	
510	Nikolai Topor-Stanley	DF	4	0	22 March 2008	Singapore	14 October 2014	Qatar	
522	Scott Jamieson	DF	4	0	28 February 2009	Indonesia	9 December 2012	Taiwan	
524	Matt Thompson	MF	4	0	28 February 2009	Indonesia	3 March 2010	Indonesia	
595	Danny Vukovic	GK	4	0	27 March 2018	Colombia	7 June 2021	Chinese Taipei	
603	Andrew Redmayne *	GK	4	0	7 June 2019	South Korea	25 September 2022	New Zealand	
615	Joel King *	DF	4	0	27 January 2022	Vietnam	25 September 2022	New Zealand	
621	Nicholas D'Agostino *	FW	4	0	29 March 2022	Saudi Arabia	15 October 2025	United States	
647	Anthony Caceres *	MF	4	0	14 November 2024	Saudi Arabia	11 June 2025	Saudi Arabia	
649	Ryan Teague *	MF	4	0	25 March 2025	China	5 September 2025	New Zealand	
650	Paul Izzo *	GK	4	0	5 September 2025	New Zealand	19 November 2025	Colombia	
660	Cristian Volpato *	FW	4	0	7 June 2026	Switzerland	3 July 2026	Egypt	
662	Marcus Younis*	FW	4	0	25 September 2026	Brazil	17 November 2026	Jordan	
3	Dave Cumberford	DF	3	0	17 June 1922	New Zealand	8 July 1922	New Zealand	
4	Jock Cumberford	MF	3	0	17 June 1922	New Zealand	8 July 1922	New Zealand	
7	Allen Fisher	DF	3	0	17 June 1922	New Zealand	8 July 1922	New Zealand	
9	Clarence Shenton	DF	3	0	17 June 1922	New Zealand	8 July 1922	New Zealand	
15	Cliff Gedge	DF	3	0	9 June 1923	New Zealand	30 June 1923	New Zealand	
16	Percy Lennard	FW	3	0	9 June 1923	New Zealand	30 June 1923	New Zealand	
18	William Mitchell	FW	3	0	9 June 1923	New Zealand	30 June 1923	New Zealand	
20	Jack White	DF	3	0	9 June 1923	New Zealand	7 June 1924	Canada	
25	William Owen	DF	3	0	30 June 1923	New Zealand	28 June 1924	Canada	
34	Stan Bourke		3	0	14 June 1924	Canada	26 July 1924	Canada	
50	James Donaldson		3	0	5 June 1933	New Zealand	18 July 1936	New Zealand	
55	Charlie O'Connor		3	0	5 June 1933	New Zealand	24 June 1933	New Zealand	
67	Alec Forrest		3	0	4 July 1936	New Zealand	1 October 1938	India	
68	Jim Harden		3	0	4 July 1936	New Zealand	18 July 1936	New Zealand	
69	Billy Price		3	6	4 July 1936	New Zealand	18 July 1936	New Zealand	
101	Dick Kemp		3	0	31 May 1947	South Africa	14 June 1947	South Africa	
108	Angus Drennan		3	0	28 August 1948	New Zealand	11 September 1948	New Zealand	
121	Lou Hearne		3	0	14 August 1954	New Zealand	4 September 1954	New Zealand	
133	Colin Kitching		3	0	3 September 1955	South Africa	12 December 1956	India	
135	Cliff Almond		3	0	10 September 1955	South Africa	1 October 1955	South Africa	
153	George Arthur		3	0	27 November 1956	Japan	12 December 1956	India	
154	Graham McMillan		3	1	27 November 1956	Japan	12 December 1956	India	
158	Brian Vogler		3	2	12 December 1956	India	23 August 1958	New Zealand	
180	Ron Giles		3	0	26 November 1965	Cambodia	28 May 1967	Scotland	
181	Ian Johnston		3	1	26 November 1965	Cambodia	8 December 1965	Malaysia	
189	John Giacometti		3	0	28 May 1967	Scotland	3 June 1967	Scotland	
209	David Zeman		3	0	20 October 1969	South Korea	4 December 1969	Israel	
229	Jim Armstrong		3	1	9 October 1972	New Zealand	24 October 1972	South Korea	
232	Bogdan Nyskohus		3	0	9 October 1972	New Zealand	29 October 1972	Philippines	
254	John Davies		3	0	11 August 1976	Hong Kong	18 June 1978	Greece	
255	Kevin Mullen		3	0	11 August 1976	Hong Kong	12 June 1980	Northern Ireland	
296	Paul Kay		3	0	26 February 1980	Papua New Guinea	6 September 1981	Taiwan	
327	Peter Tredinnick		3	0	4 December 1983	China	18 December 1983	Singapore	
360	Steve Calderan		3	0	12 March 1989	New Zealand	2 April 1989	New Zealand	
374	David Lowe		3	0	6 February 1991	Czechoslovakia	15 May 1991	New Zealand	
381	Aytek Genc		3	1	12 May 1991	New Zealand	18 January 1997	New Zealand	
384	Darren Stewart		3	0	8 July 1992	Croatia	26 September 1992	Solomon Islands	
385	Mike Grbevski		3	0	8 July 1992	Croatia	11 August 1992	Malaysia	
398	Francis Awaritefe		3	1	24 September 1993	South Korea	10 February 1996	Japan	
404	Ross Aloisi		3	0	24 September 1994	Kuwait	6 June 1998	Croatia	
412	Sean Cranney		3	0	10 November 1995	New Zealand	18 September 1996	South Africa	
416	George Kulcsar		3	0	23 April 1996	Chile	12 March 1997	Macedonia	
427	Robert Trajkovski		3	0	22 January 1997	South Korea	2 October 1998	Tahiti	
486	Joel Griffiths		3	1	9 October 2005	Jamaica	23 May 2008	Ghana	
501	Shane Stefanutto		3	0	24 March 2007	China	5 September 2009	South Korea	
503	Danny Allsopp	FW	3	0	2 June 2007	Uruguay	28 January 2009	Indonesia	
541	Nathan Coe	GK	3	0	5 January 2011	United Arab Emirates	7 October 2011	Malaysia	
544	Adam Sarota	DF	3	0	10 August 2011	Wales	6 September 2012	Lebanon	
552	Matt Smith	MF	3	0	3 December 2012	Hong Kong	7 December 2012	Guam	
554	Terry Antonis	MF	3	0	3 December 2012	Hong Kong	9 December 2012	Taiwan	
579	Tarek Elrich	DF	3	0	30 March 2015	Macedonia	8 October 2015	Jordan	
593	Dimitri Petratos *	MF	3	0	23 March 2018	Norway	7 June 2019	South Korea	
614	Callum Elder *	DF	3	0	2 September 2021	China	19 November 2025	Colombia	
617	Gianni Stensness *	MF	3	0	24 March 2022	Japan	13 November 2026	Qatar	
626	Jason Cummings *	FW	3	1	25 September 2022	New Zealand	28 March 2023	Ecuador	
630	Alexander Robertson *	MF	3	0	24 March 2023	Ecuador	31 March 2026	Curaçao	
642	Josh Nisbet *	MF	3	0	26 March 2024	Lebanon	10 September 2024	Indonesia	
13	George Brown	FW	2	1	24 June 1922	New Zealand	8 July 1922	New Zealand	
19	Sid Robinson	DF	2	0	9 June 1923	New Zealand	16 June 1923	New Zealand	
21	Jack Gilmore	FW	2	0	16 June 1923	New Zealand	28 June 1924	Canada	
29	Andy Henderson		2	0	7 June 1924	Canada	14 June 1924	Canada	
42	Cecil Williams		2	0	28 June 1924	Canada	12 July 1924	Canada	
70	Vic Sharp		2	0	4 July 1936	New Zealand	11 July 1936	New Zealand	
73	Alf Henwood		2	0	3 September 1938	India	17 September 1938	India	
74	Alf Quill		2	2	3 September 1938	India	24 September 1938	India	
76	Cec Brittain		2	0	10 September 1938	India	17 September 1938	India	
90	Dave Coote		2	0	10 May 1947	South Africa	24 May 1947	South Africa	
93	Ted Drain		2	0	10 May 1947	South Africa	24 September 1955	South Africa	
102	Robert Murray		2	0	7 June 1947	South Africa	14 June 1947	South Africa	
109	Alec Duncan		2	0	4 September 1948	New Zealand	3 September 1955	South Africa	
118	Cyril Nichols		2	0	17 June 1950	Rhodesia	1 July 1950	South Africa	
131	Bill Murphy		2	1	4 September 1954	New Zealand	17 September 1955	South Africa	
137	Ralph Piercy		2	0	10 September 1955	South Africa	17 September 1955	South Africa	
160	Harry Murdoch		2	0	16 August 1958	New Zealand	23 August 1958	New Zealand	
177	Steve Herczeg	FW	2	0	24 November 1965	North Korea	3 December 1965	Chinese Taipei	
185	Peter Fuzes		2	0	28 May 1967	Scotland	3 June 1967	Scotland	
202	Ted de Lyster	FW	2	0	17 November 1967	Indonesia	21 November 1967	Singapore	
220	Sandy Irvine	DF	2	0	10 November 1970	Israel	2 December 1970	Mexico	
230	Terry Butler	FW	2	1	9 October 1972	New Zealand	29 October 1972	Philippines	
244	Duncan Cummings	FW	2	1	6 August 1975	China	11 August 1976	Hong Kong	
253	Richard Bell		2	0	11 August 1976	Hong Kong	20 October 1976	Indonesia	
257	Mendo Ristovski		2	0	11 August 1976	Hong Kong	11 June 1978	Greece	
270	Sebastian Giampaolo		2	0	18 June 1978	Greece	25 April 1981	New Zealand	
272	John O'Shea		2	0	18 June 1978	Greece	13 June 1979	New Zealand	
274	Joe Senkalski		2	0	18 June 1978	Greece	26 August 1980	Mexico	
293	Yakka Banovic		2	0	26 February 1980	Papua New Guinea	15 June 1980	Northern Ireland	
305	Billy Rogers		2	0	25 April 1981	New Zealand	16 May 1981	New Zealand	
310	Glenn Ahearn		2	0	30 August 1981	Indonesia	6 September 1981	Taiwan	
312	Mark Koussas		2	0	30 August 1981	Indonesia	6 September 1981	Taiwan	
313	Grant Lee		2	0	30 August 1981	Indonesia	6 September 1981	Taiwan	
320	Charlie Egan		2	0	6 October 1982	Thailand	11 October 1982	Indonesia	
345	Rod Brown		2	0	2 September 1987	New Zealand	9 September 1987	New Zealand	
347	Jean-Paul de Marigny	DF	2	0	15 November 1987	Taiwan	6 September 1990	South Korea	
379	Andrew Callanan		2	0	12 May 1991	New Zealand	15 May 1991	New Zealand	
383	John Filan		2	0	21 June 1992	Uruguay	2 April 1997	Hungary	
388	Tony Franken		2	0	14 August 1992	Indonesia	26 September 1992	Solomon Islands	
392	Gary Hasler		2	0	11 September 1992	Tahiti	26 September 1992	Solomon Islands	
411	Frank Juric	GK	2	0	10 November 1995	New Zealand	10 February 1996	Japan	
430	Paul Bilokapic	MF	2	0	7 February 1998	Chile	11 February 1998	South Korea	
440	Glenn Gwynne	DF	2	0	28 September 1998	Cook Islands	2 October 1998	Tahiti	
450	Michael Curcija	FW	2	0	4 October 2000	Kuwait	7 October 2000	South Korea	
452	Con Blatsis	DF	2	0	7 October 2000	South Korea	28 February 2001	Colombia	
463	Sasho Petrovski	FW	2	1	15 August 2001	Japan	16 August 2006	Kuwait	
488	Ante Covic	GK	2	0	22 February 2006	Bahrain	22 March 2008	Singapore	
495	Kristian Sarkies	MF	2	0	7 June 2006	Liechtenstein	22 June 2008	China	
496	Travis Dodd	FW	2	1	16 August 2006	Kuwait	11 October 2006	Bahrain	
506	Mark Bridge	FW	2	0	22 March 2008	Singapore	23 May 2008	Ghana	
518	David Williams	FW	2	0	22 June 2008	China	3 March 2010	Indonesia	
521	Dean Heffernan	DF	2	1	28 January 2009	Indonesia	6 January 2010	Kuwait	
523	Paul Reid	MF	2	0	28 January 2009	Indonesia	5 March 2009	Kuwait	
549	Eli Babalj	FW	2	2	14 November 2012	South Korea	7 December 2012	Guam	
556	Dino Djulbic	DF	2	0	7 December 2012	Guam	9 December 2012	Taiwan	
560	Erik Paartalu	MF	2	0	20 July 2013	South Africa	28 July 2013	China	
569	Curtis Good *	DF	2	0	5 March 2014	South Africa	7 June 2021	Chinese Taipei	
577	Bernie Ibini-Isei	FW	2	0	10 October 2014	United Arab Emirates	14 October 2014	Qatar	
612	Ruon Tongyik *	DF	2	0	7 June 2021	Chinese Taipei	11 June 2021	Nepal	
640	John Iredale *	FW	2	1	21 March 2024	Lebanon	26 March 2024	Lebanon	
651	Nicolas Milanovic *	FW	2	0	5 September 2025	New Zealand	9 September 2025	New Zealand	
659	Deni Juric *	FW	2	0	27 March 2026	Cameroon	31 March 2026	Curaçao	
664	Sam Klein *	MF	2	0	13 November 2026	Qatar	17 November 2026	Jordan	
665	Kasey Bos *	DF	2	0	13 November 2026	Qatar	17 November 2026	Jordan	
666	Diesel Herrington *	DF	2	0	13 November 2026	Qatar	17 November 2026	Jordan	
12	Wilfred Bratton	MF	1	1	24 June 1922	New Zealand			
14	Mosie Burton	FW	1	0	9 June 1923	New Zealand			
17	James Love	FW	1	0	9 June 1923	New Zealand			
22	Johnny Peebles	DF	1	0	16 June 1923	New Zealand			
23	Bob Austin	GK	1	0	30 June 1923	New Zealand			
27	Jack Edwards	MF	1	0	7 June 1924	Canada			
31	Eric Nunn	MF	1	0	7 June 1924	Canada			
35	William Faulkner	MF	1	0	14 June 1924	Canada			
36	Jim Robinson	GK	1	0	14 June 1924	Canada			
40	Henry Maunder	DF	1	0	28 June 1924	Canada			
41	George Roe	FW	1	0	28 June 1924	Canada			
43	George Bristow	FW	1	0	12 July 1924	Canada			
44	Johnny Orr	FW	1	0	12 July 1924	Canada			
45	George Raitt	DF	1	0	12 July 1924	Canada			
46	Fred Ramsey	FW	1	0	12 July 1924	Canada			
47	Arch Lambert	DF	1	0	26 July 1924	Canada			
51A	Angus Gibb	MF	1	0	5 June 1933	New Zealand			
54	Bert Murray	MF	1	0	5 June 1933	New Zealand			
58	Ian Davidson	MF	1	0	17 June 1933	New Zealand			
61	Tom Tennant	MF	1	0	17 June 1933	New Zealand			
63	Frank Laidlaw	DF	1	0	24 June 1933	New Zealand			
65	Jack Taylor	MF	1	0	24 June 1933	New Zealand			
78	Fat Kitching		1	1	10 September 1938	India			
80	Eric Petie		1	0	10 September 1938	India			
81	Harold Whitelaw		1	0	17 September 1938	India			
82	Aub Mascord		1	0	24 September 1938	India			
83	Ian Evans		1	0	1 October 1938	India			
84	Alf Mackey		1	0	1 October 1938	India			
85	Frank McIver		1	0	1 October 1938	India			
87	Aku Roth		1	0	1 October 1938	India			
88	Alf White		1	0	1 October 1938	India			
116	Jack Smith		1	0	14 June 1950	Southern Rhodesia			
120	Dave Bone		1	0	14 August 1954	New Zealand			
122	Jack Mather		1	0	14 August 1954	New Zealand			
123	Harry Rice		1	0	14 August 1954	New Zealand			
124	Frank Sands		1	0	14 August 1954	New Zealand			
125	Les Suchanek		1	0	14 August 1954	New Zealand			
132	Clem Higgins		1	0	3 September 1955	South Africa			
136	Keith Learmonth	FW	1	0	10 September 1955	South Africa			
139	John McCarthy		1	0	10 September 1955	South Africa			
140	Albert De Paoli		1	0	17 September 1955	South Africa			
141	Bill Mahoney	GK	1	0	17 September 1955	South Africa			
142	Con Purser	DF	1	0	17 September 1955	South Africa			
143	Ron Burns	MF	1	0	24 September 1955	South Africa			
145	Mildo Mueller	MF	1	0	24 September 1955	South Africa			
146	Phil Peters	MF	1	0	24 September 1955	South Africa			
147	Doug Wendt		1	0	24 September 1955	South Africa			
148	Alan Garside	FW	1	0	1 October 1955	South Africa			
149	Bill Paddocks	FW	1	0	1 October 1955	South Africa			
151	Ken Vairy	FW	1	1	1 October 1955	South Africa			
163	Norm Rule	DF	1	0	23 August 1958	New Zealand			
169	John Roberts	GK	1	0	21 November 1965	South Korea			
187	George Nuttall	DF	1	0	28 May 1967	Scotland			
204	Ross Kelly	GK	1	0	4 April 1968	Japan			
219	John Doyle	FW	1	0	10 November 1970	Israel			
231	John McDonald	MF	1	0	9 October 1972	New Zealand			
241	Rene Colusso	FW	1	0	6 August 1975	China			
242	Mike Micevski	FW	1	0	6 August 1975	China			
248	Rudolfo Gnavi	MF	1	0	20 November 1975	Soviet Union			
250	John Russell	MF	1	0	30 November 1975	Soviet Union			
258	Pete Stone	MF	1	0	11 August 1976	Hong Kong			
264	Kris Kalifatidis	DF	1	0	11 June 1978	Greece			
265	Peter Laumets	GK	1	0	11 June 1978	Greece			
266	Josip Picioane	MF	1	0	11 June 1978	Greece			
267	John Stevenson	MF	1	0	18 June 1978	Greece			
269	Steve Kokoska	DF	1	0	11 June 1978	Greece			
271	Sauro Iozzelli	GK	1	0	18 June 1978	Greece			
275	John Karaspyros	DF	1	0	18 June 1978	Greece			
276	Gary Meier	GK	1	0	18 June 1978	Greece			
277	Paul Degney	DF	1	0	13 June 1979	New Zealand			
289	Peter Boyle	FW	1	0	27 January 1980	Czechoslovakia			
294	Vic Bozanic	DF	1	0	26 February 1980	Papua New Guinea			
297	Danny Moulis	DF	1	0	26 February 1980	Papua New Guinea			
298	Ian Hunter	FW	1	3	26 February 1980	Papua New Guinea			
299	Mark Brusasco	FW	1	0	26 February 1980	Papua New Guinea			
303	John Spanos	DF	1	0	7 December 1980	Indonesia			
316	Brett Woods	DF	1	0	30 August 1981	Indonesia			
317	John Little	MF	1	0	30 August 1981	Indonesia			
318	Howard Tredinnick	FW	1	0	6 September 1981	Taiwan			
341	Sergio Melta	MF	1	0	6 August 1986	Czechoslovakia			
389	Mark Talajcic	MF	1	0	14 August 1992	Indonesia			
400	George Slifkas	FW	1	0	26 September 1993	South Korea			
417	Walter Ardone	MF	1	0	23 April 1996	Chile			
422	Lorenz Kindtner	DF	1	0	9 October 1996	Chile			
434	Nick Rizzo	FW	1	0	6 June 1998	Croatia			
442	Raphael Bove	MF	1	0	6 November 1998	United States			
446	Matthew Horsley	DF	1	0	15 February 2000	Bulgaria			
448	Richard Johnson	MF	1	0	29 March 2000	Czech Republic			
462	Mark Robertson		1	0	15 August 2001	Japan			
470	Dean Anastasiadis	GK	1	0	8 July 2002	New Caledonia			
497	Michael Valkanis	DF	1	0	16 August 2006	Kuwait			
505	Nik Mrdja	FW	1	0	11 September 2007	Argentina			
513	Adrian Leijer	DF	1	0	22 March 2008	Singapore			
514	Leigh Broxham	MF	1	0	22 March 2008	Singapore			
527	Billy Celeski	MF	1	0	28 January 2009	Indonesia			
529	Daniel Mullen	DF	1	0	5 March 2009	Kuwait			
531	Fabian Barbiero	MF	1	0	5 March 2009	Kuwait			
536	Matthew Kemp	FW	1	0	6 January 2010	Kuwait			
537	Shannon Cole	DF	1	0	3 March 2010	Indonesia			
543	Brent McGrath	FW	1	0	29 March 2011	Germany			
557	Michael Marrone	DF	1	1	7 December 2012	Guam			
563	Mark Birighitti *	GK	1	0	28 July 2013	China			
565	Connor Pain *	FW	1	0	28 July 2013	China			
590	Dylan McGowan	DF	1	0	13 June 2017	Brazil			
602	Brandon O'Neill *	MF	1	0	7 June 2019	South Korea			
605	Ryan Williams *	FW	1	0	7 June 2019	South Korea			
613	Lawrence Thomas *	GK	1	0	11 June 2021	Nepal			
623	Harrison Delbridge *	DF	1	0	25 September 2022	New Zealand			
644	Apostolos Stamatelopoulos *	FW	1	0	11 June 2024	Palestine			
646	Luke Brattan *	MF	1	0	15 October 2024	Japan			
648	Hayden Matthews *	DF	1	0	19 November 2024	Bahrain			
657	Al Hassan Toure *	FW	1	0	15 November 2025	Venezuela			
663	Eli Adams *	FW	1	0	13 November 2026	Qatar			
