= List of Australia men's international soccer players with one cap =

The Australia national football team represents the country of Australia in international association football. It is fielded by Football Federation Australia, the governing body of soccer in Australia, and competes as a member of the Asian Football Confederation (AFC), which encompasses the countries of Asia.

Australia have competed in numerous competitions, and all players who have played in only one match, either as a member of the starting eleven or as a substitute, are listed below. Each player's details include his usual playing position while with the team, the number of caps earned and goals scored in all international matches, and details of the first and most recent matches played in. The names are initially ordered by date of debut, and then by alphabetical order. All statistics are correct up to and including the match played against Lebanon on 21 March 2024.

== Key ==
Player
This colour background and the * symbol indicate that the player was active at club level as at the date specified above.

Positions key
GK	Goalkeeper
DF	Defender
MF	Midfielder
FW	Forward

Position
Playing positions are listed according to the tactical formations that were employed at the time. Thus the change in the names of defensive and midfield positions reflects the tactical evolution that occurred from the 1960s onwards.
Caps and goals
Caps and goals comprise those in the FIFA World Cup, AFC Asian Cup, OFC Nations Cup their associated qualification matches and international friendly tournaments and matches.

== Players ==
Australia national soccer team players with one cap
Player	Pos.	Caps	Goals	Appearance		Refs.
Player	Pos.	Caps	Goals	Date	Opponent	Refs.
Wilfred Bratton	MF	1	1	24 June 1922	New Zealand	
Mosie Burton	FW	1	0	9 June 1923	New Zealand	
James Love	FW	1	0	9 June 1923	New Zealand	
Johnny Peebles	DF	1	0	16 June 1923	New Zealand	
Bob Austin	GK	1	0	30 June 1923	New Zealand	
Jack Edwards	MF	1	0	7 June 1924	Canada	
Eric Nunn	MF	1	0	7 June 1924	Canada	
William Faulkner	MF	1	0	14 June 1924	Canada	
Jim Robinson	GK	1	0	14 June 1924	Canada	
Henry Maunder	DF	1	0	28 June 1924	Canada	
George Roe	FW	1	0	28 June 1924	Canada	
George Bristow	FW	1	0	12 July 1924	Canada	
Johnny Orr	FW	1	0	12 July 1924	Canada	
George Raitt	DF	1	0	12 July 1924	Canada	
Fred Ramsey	FW	1	0	12 July 1924	Canada	
Arch Lambert	DF	1	0	26 July 1924	Canada	
Angus Gibb	MF	1	0	5 June 1933	New Zealand	
Bert Murray	MF	1	0	5 June 1933	New Zealand	
Ian Davidson	MF	1	0	17 June 1933	New Zealand	
Tom Tennant	MF	1	0	17 June 1933	New Zealand	
Frank Laidlaw	DF	1	0	24 June 1933	New Zealand	
Jack Taylor	MF	1	0	24 June 1933	New Zealand	
Fat Kitching		1	1	10 September 1938	India	
Eric Petie		1	0	10 September 1938	India	
Harold Whitelaw		1	0	17 September 1938	India	
Aub Mascord		1	0	24 September 1938	India	
Ian Evans		1	0	1 October 1938	India	
Alf Mackey		1	0	1 October 1938	India	
Frank McIver		1	0	1 October 1938	India	
Aku Roth		1	0	1 October 1938	India	
Alf White		1	0	1 October 1938	India	
Jack Smith		1	0	14 June 1950	Southern Rhodesia	
Dave Bone		1	0	14 August 1954	New Zealand	
Jack Mather		1	0	14 August 1954	New Zealand	
Harry Rice		1	0	14 August 1954	New Zealand	
Frank Sands		1	0	14 August 1954	New Zealand	
Les Suchanek		1	0	14 August 1954	New Zealand	
Clem Higgins		1	0	3 September 1955	South Africa	
Keith Learmonth	FW	1	0	10 September 1955	South Africa	
Arthur McCartney		1	0	10 September 1955	South Africa	
Albert De Paoli		1	0	17 September 1955	South Africa	
Bill Mahoney	GK	1	0	17 September 1955	South Africa	
Con Purser	DF	1	0	17 September 1955	South Africa	
Ron Burns	MF	1	0	24 September 1955	South Africa	
Mildo Mueller	MF	1	0	24 September 1955	South Africa	
Phil Peters	MF	1	0	24 September 1955	South Africa	
Doug Wendt		1	0	24 September 1955	South Africa	
Alan Garside	FW	1	0	1 October 1955	South Africa	
Bill Paddocks	FW	1	0	1 October 1955	South Africa	
Ken Vairy	FW	1	1	1 October 1955	South Africa	
Norm Rule	DF	1	0	23 August 1958	New Zealand	
John Roberts	GK	1	0	21 November 1965	South Korea	
George Nuttall	DF	1	0	28 May 1967	Scotland	
Ross Kelly	GK	1	0	4 April 1968	Japan	
John Doyle	FW	1	0	10 November 1970	Israel	
John McDonald	MF	1	0	9 October 1972	New Zealand	
Rene Colusso	FW	1	0	6 August 1975	China	
Mike Micevski	FW	1	0	6 August 1975	China	
Rudolfo Gnavi	MF	1	0	20 November 1975	Soviet Union	
John Russell	MF	1	0	30 November 1975	Soviet Union	
Pete Stone	MF	1	0	11 August 1976	Hong Kong	
Steve Kokoska	DF	1	0	11 June 1978	Greece	
Peter Laumets	GK	1	0	11 June 1978	Greece	
Josip Picioane	MF	1	0	11 June 1978	Greece	
John Stevenson	MF	1	0	18 June 1978	Greece	
Sauro Iozzelli	DF	1	0	18 June 1978	Greece	
John Karaspyros	DF	1	0	18 June 1978	Greece	
Gary Meier	GK	1	0	18 June 1978	Greece	
Paul Degney	DF	1	0	13 June 1979	New Zealand	
Peter Boyle	FW	1	0	27 January 1980	Czechoslovakia	
Vic Bozanic	DF	1	0	26 February 1980	Papua New Guinea	
Mark Brusasco	FW	1	0	26 February 1980	Papua New Guinea	
Ian Hunter	FW	1	3	26 February 1980	Papua New Guinea	
Danny Moulis	DF	1	0	26 February 1980	Papua New Guinea	
John Spanos	DF	1	0	7 December 1980	Indonesia	
John Little	MF	1	0	30 August 1981	Indonesia	
Brett Woods	DF	1	0	30 August 1981	Indonesia	
Howard Tredinnick	FW	1	0	6 September 1981	Taiwan	
Sergio Melta	MF	1	0	6 August 1986	Czechoslovakia	
Mark Talajcic	MF	1	0	14 August 1992	Indonesia	
George Slifkas	FW	1	0	26 September 1993	South Korea	
Walter Ardone	MF	1	0	23 April 1996	Chile	
Kris Kalifatidis	DF	1	0	21 September 1996	Kenya	
Lorenz Kindtner	DF	1	0	9 October 1996	Chile	
Nick Rizzo	FW	1	0	6 June 1998	Croatia	
Raphael Bove	MF	1	0	6 November 1998	United States	
Matthew Horsley	DF	1	0	15 February 2000	Bulgaria	
Richard Johnson	MF	1	0	29 March 2000	Czech Republic	
Mark Robertson		1	0	15 August 2001	Japan	
Dean Anastasiadis	GK	1	0	8 July 2002	New Caledonia	
Michael Valkanis	DF	1	0	16 August 2006	Kuwait	
Nik Mrdja	FW	1	0	11 September 2007	Argentina	
Leigh Broxham	MF	1	0	22 March 2008	Singapore	
Adrian Leijer	DF	1	0	22 March 2008	Singapore	
Billy Celeski	MF	1	0	28 January 2009	Indonesia	
Fabian Barbiero	MF	1	0	5 March 2009	Kuwait	
Daniel Mullen *	DF	1	0	5 March 2009	Kuwait	
Matthew Kemp	FW	1	0	6 January 2010	Kuwait	
Shannon Cole	DF	1	0	3 March 2010	Indonesia	
Brent McGrath	FW	1	0	29 March 2011	Germany	
Michael Marrone *	DF	1	1	7 December 2012	Guam	
Mark Birighitti *	GK	1	0	28 July 2013	China	
Connor Pain *	FW	1	0	28 July 2013	China	
Jason Geria *	DF	1	0	4 June 2016	Greece	
Dylan McGowan *	DF	1	0	13 June 2017	Brazil	
Brandon O'Neill *	MF	1	0	7 June 2019	South Korea	
Ryan Williams *	FW	1	0	7 June 2019	South Korea	
Lawrence Thomas *	GK	1	0	11 June 2021	Nepal	
Callum Elder *	DF	1	0	2 September 2021	China	
Harrison Delbridge *	DF	1	0	25 September 2022	New Zealand	
Mohamed Toure *	FW	1	0	13 October 2023	England	
Alessandro Circati *	DF	1	0	18 October 2023	New Zealand	
Patrick Yazbek *	MF	1	0	26 March 2024	Lebanon	
Josh Nisbet *	MF	1	0	26 March 2024	Lebanon	

== See also ==
- List of Australia international soccer players, covering players with ten or more caps
- List of Australia international soccer players (4–9 caps)
- List of Australia international soccer players (2–3 caps)
