= 1924 in Australian soccer =

The 1924 season was the 41st season of regional competitive soccer in Australia.

== National teams ==
=== Australia men's national soccer team ===
Australia began the first of a six-match series hosting Canada with the first match at Brisbane Cricket Ground on 7 June with seven players making their national team debuts and winning the match 3–2 via two goals from Judy Masters and one from Dave Ward. The next week saw four more debutants for the second match played at the Royal Agricultural Showground on 14 June, where Australia lost 1–0 to Canada. The third match was played at the same venus on 23 June, this time Australia claiming the win 4–1 against Canada through braces by Judy Masters and William Maunder. Five days later in their fourth match of the series, Australia drew their first international match 0–0 against Canada at Newcastle Showground on 28 June. With two days rest heading into the fifth match and what initially was to be the final match of the series against Canada at Jubilee Oval in Adelaide on 12 July, Australia lost for the second time in the series 4–1 with William Maunder scoring the goal for Australia. It was confirmed that a sixth match would be held at the Royal Agricultural Showground on 26 July, in which Australia would win 1–0 against Canada with Judy Masters scoring the winning goal. Australia's six match series against Canada in 1924 resulted in three wins, one draw, and two losses.

==== Results and fixtures ====
===== Friendlies =====
7 June 1924	Australia	3–2	Canada	Brisbane, Australia
	Ward 38'; Masters 60', 80'	Report	Linning 25'; Forrest 81'	Stadium: Brisbane Cricket Ground; Attendance: 10,000

14 June 1924	Australia	0–1	Canada	Sydney, Australia
		Report	Stobbart (?)	Stadium: Royal Agricultural Showground; Attendance: 8,000; Referee: W. Allerton (Australia)

23 June 1924	Australia	4–1	Canada	Sydney, Australia
	Masters (?); Maunder (?)	Report	Forrest (?)	Stadium: Royal Agricultural Showground; Attendance: 7,000~; Referee: W.A. Wright (Australia)

28 June 1924	Australia	0–0	Canada	Newcastle, Australia
		Report		Stadium: Newcastle Showground; Attendance: 10,000; Referee: J. Nicholson (Australia)

12 July 1924	Australia	1–4	Canada	Adelaide, Australia
	Maunder (?)	Report	Wilson (?); Linning 41'; Stobbart (?)	Stadium: Jubilee Oval; Attendance: 5,000~; Referee: G.A. Childs (Australia)

26 July 1924	Australia	1–0	Canada	Sydney, Australia
	Masters (?)	Report		Stadium: Royal Agricultural Showground; Attendance: 8,000; Referee: J. Nicholson (Australia)

==== Player statistics ====
Pos.	Player	Apps	Goals
GK	George Cartwright	5	0
GK	Jim Robison	1	0
FB	William Faulkner	1	0
FB	Frank Gallen	4	0
FB	Charlie Leabeater	2	0
FB	Henry Maunder	1	0
FB	Tommy Oliver	4	0
FB	Ernie Owen	2	0
FB	George Raitt	1	0
HB	George Bristow	1	0
HB	Andy Henderson	2	0
HB	Arch Lambert	1	0
HB	Eric Nunn	1	0
HB	George Roe	1	0
HB	Harry Spurway	4	0
HB	Gilbert Storey	4	0
HB	Jack White	1	0
FW	Stan Bourke	3	0
FW	Jack Edwards	1	0
FW	Jack Gilmore	1	0
FW	Judy Masters	5	5
FW	William Maunder	3	3
FW	Roy McNaughton	2	0
FW	Frank Melliar-Smith	2	0
FW	Johnny Orr	1	0
FW	Fred Ramsay	1	0
FW	Henry Sherringham	2	0
FW	Tom Thompson	3	0
FW	Dave Ward	4	1
FW	Cecil Williams	2	0

== League competitions ==
Federation	Competition	Grand Final			Regular Season		
Federation	Competition	Champions	Score	Runners-up	Winners	Runners-up	Third place
Northern District British Football Association	Northern NSW Football League	West Wallsend Bluebells	3–1 (R)	West Wallsend	Cessnock	Wallsend	West Wallsend Bluebells
Australian Soccer Association	Sydney Metropolitan First Division	Granville	Unknown		Granville	Two Blues	Unknown
Queensland British Football Association	Brisbane Area League	Not played			Pineapple Rovers	Bundamba Rangers	Dinmore Bush Rats
South Australian British Football Association	South Australian Metropolitan League	Not played			Hindmarsh	North Adelaide	South Adelaide
Tasmanian Soccer Association	Tasmanian Division One	Sandy Bay	6–1	Elphin	Unknown		
Anglo-Australian Football Association	Victorian League Division One	Not played			Footscray Thistle	St Kilda	Newport
Western Australian Soccer Football Association	Western Australian Division One	Not played			Perth City	Northern Casuals	Claremont

== Cup competitions ==
Federation	Competition	Winners	Runners-up	Venue	Result
Northern District British Football Association	Ellis Cup	Wallsend	Cessnock	–	2–1
New South Wales British Football Association	Gardiner Challenge Cup	West Wallsend (5/4)	Woonona (0/1)	–	3–0
South Australian British Football Association	South Australian Federation Cup	Holdens United (1/0)	Prospect United (1/1)	–	1–0
Tasmanian Soccer Association	Falkinder Cup	South Hobart (4/2)	Corinthians (2/2)	–	2–0 (R)
Anglo-Australian Football Association	Dockerty Cup	Naval Depot (1/0)	Footscray Thistle (1/1)	–	1–0

(Note: figures in parentheses display the club's competition record as winners/runners-up.)

== See also ==
- Soccer in Australia
