= List of Australia men's international soccer players born outside Australia =

This is a list of foreign-born soccer players who played for the Australia national soccer team.

== Players ==
=== Argentina ===
- Walter Ardone
- Pablo Cardozo
- Oscar Crino
- Rodolfo Gnavi
- Gabriel Mendez

=== Austria ===
- James Jeggo

=== Belgium ===
- Paul Okon-Engstler

=== Bosnia and Herzegovina ===
- Eli Babalj
- Yakka Banovic
- Dino Djulbic
- Ivo Prskalo

=== Brazil ===
- Agenor Muniz

=== Croatia ===
- Branko Buljevic
- Miloš Degenek
- Fran Karacic
- Frank Micic
- Branko Milosevic
- Dario Vidošić
- Billy Vojtek

=== Czechoslovakia ===
- Mildo Mueller
- David Zeman

=== Egypt ===
- Garang Kuol

=== England ===
- Stan Ackerley
- Alan Ainslie
- Adrian Alston
- Francis Awaritefe
- Roy Blitz
- Ken Boden
- Luke Brattan
- Wilfred Bratton
- Greg Brown
- Gary Byrne
- Alec Cameron
- Jim Campbell
- Gary Cole
- Robert Cornthwaite
- John Coyne
- Martyn Crook
- Duncan Cummings
- John Davies
- Mike Denton
- Bill Edwards
- William Faulkner
- Jack Gilmour
- Dave Harding
- Tony Henderson
- Clem Higgins
- Ray Ilott
- Neil Kilkenny
- Ray Lloyd
- David Lowe
- Alf Mackey
- Jack Mather
- Frank McIver
- Frank Millier-Smith
- Kevin Muscat
- Alan Niven
- George Nuttall
- Phil O'Connor
- Tommy Oliver
- Peter Ollerton
- Ralph Piercy
- David Ratcliffe
- Ray Richards
- Jim Robison
- Samuel Silvera
- Robbie Slater
- Geoff Sleight
- Matt Smith
- John Spanos
- Warren Spink
- Pete Stone
- Ryan Strain
- Jim Tansey
- Jack Taylor
- Paul Wade
- Danny Walsh
- Johnny Watkiss
- Alf White
- Peter Wilson
- John Yzendoorn

=== France ===
- Denis Genreau

=== Germany ===
- Roger Romanowicz
- Manfred Schaefer
- Les Scheinflug

=== Greece ===
- Apostolos Giannou
- George Haniotis
- Peter Katholos
- Ange Postecoglou
- Peter Raskopoulos

=== Guinea ===
- Mohamed Touré

=== Hong Kong ===
- Connor Pain

=== Hungary ===
- Attila Abonyi
- Peter Fuzes
- Steve Herczeg
- George Kulcsar
- Les Suchanek

=== Iran ===
- Daniel Arzani

=== Ireland ===
- John Doyle
- Alex Gibb

=== Italy ===
- Raphael Bove
- John Giacometti
- John Perin
- Wally Savor

=== Kenya ===
- Thomas Deng
- Awer Mabil

=== Lebanon ===
- Abbas Saad

=== Malta ===
- Lou Vella

=== Mauritius ===
- Jean-Paul de Marigny

=== Montenegro ===
- Mehmet Duraković

=== Netherlands ===
- Ted de Lyster
- Dick van Alphen

=== New Zealand ===
- Archie Thompson

=== Nigeria ===
- Bernie Ibini

=== North Macedonia ===
- Vlado Bozinovski
- Billy Celeski
- Žarko Odžakov

=== Northern Ireland ===
- Ron Adair
- Alan Hunter
- Frank Loughran
- Billy Rice

=== Romania ===
- Josip Picioane

=== Russia ===
- Aku Roth

=== Scotland ===
- John Anderson
- Jim Armstrong
- Steve Blair
- Archie Blue
- George Blues
- Martin Boyle
- Peter Boyle
- Jimmy Cant
- Billy Cook
- Dave Cumberford
- Jock Cumberford
- Tommy Cumming
- Jason Cummings
- Ian Davidson
- Robbie Dunn
- Charlie Egan
- Alec Forrest
- Alec Heaney
- Andy Henderson
- Bobby Hogg
- Pat Hughes
- Sandy Irvine
- Tom Jack
- George Keith
- John Little
- James Love
- Jimmy Mackay
- Alan Marnoch
- Jim McCabe
- Tommy McColl
- Tom McCulloch
- John McDonald
- Garry McDowall
- Hamilton McMeechan
- Dave Mitchell
- Jim Muir
- Bill Murphy
- Kenny Murphy
- Johnny Orr
- Jamie Paton
- Jim Pearson
- Johnny Peebles
- George Raitt
- Jack Reilly
- Harry Rice
- Alex Robertson
- Jimmy Rooney
- Willie Rutherford
- Nigel Shepherd
- Harry Souttar
- John Stevenson
- Tom Tennant
- Sid Thomas
- Joe Watson
- Bob Wemyss
- Alan Westwater

=== Serbia ===
- Milan Ivanović
- Ernie Tapai
- Doug Utjesenovic

=== SFR Yugoslavia ===
- Mike Micevski
- Mendo Ristovski

=== South Africa ===
- Keanu Baccus
- Charlie O'Connor
- Billy Rogers
- Kimon Taliadoros
- Jack White

=== Southern Rhodesia ===
- Cliff van Blerk

=== Sudan ===
- Ruon Tongyik

=== Tanzania ===
- Nestory Irankunda

=== Turkey ===
- Aytek Genc

=== Ukraine ===
- Nikita Rukavytsya

=== United States ===
- Bruce Djite
- Angus "Billy" Gibb

=== Uruguay ===
- Bruno Fornaroli

=== Wales ===
- Billy Price

== List by country of birth ==
Birthplace	Players	Notes
England	59	
Scotland	56	
Croatia	7	1 player was born in the Independent State of Croatia; 1 player was born while the country was part of the Kingdom of Yugoslavia; 3 players were born while the country was part of the SFR Yugoslavia
Argentina	5	
Greece	5	
Hungary	5	
Bosnia and Herzegovina	4	4 players were born while the country was part of the SFR Yugoslavia
Northern Ireland	4	
Italy	4	
South Africa	4	
Germany	3	
North Macedonia	3	3 players were born while the country was part of the SFR Yugoslavia
Serbia	3	3 players were born while the country was part of the SFR Yugoslavia
Austria	2	
Czechoslovakia	2	
Ireland	2	
Kenya	2	
Netherlands	2	
New Zealand	2	
SFR Yugoslavia	2	
United States	2	
Belgium	1	
Brazil	1	
Egypt	1	
France	1	
Guinea	1	
Hong Kong	1	
Iran	1	
Lebanon	1	
Malta	1	
Mauritius	1	
Montenegro	1	1 players were born while the country was part of the SFR Yugoslavia
Nigeria	1	
Romania	1	
Southern Rhodesia	1	
Sudan	1	
Tanzania	1	
Turkey	1	
Ukraine	1	1 player was born while the country was part of the Soviet Union
Uruguay	1	
Wales	1	

== See also ==
- List of Australia women's international soccer players born outside Australia
- List of England international footballers born in Australia
- List of Croatia international footballers born in Australia
- List of Lebanon international footballers born in Australia
- List of Netherlands international footballers born in Australia
- List of New Zealand international footballers born in Australia
- List of Scotland international footballers born in Australia
