= List of Australia men's international soccer players (4–9 caps) =

The Australia national football team represents the country of Australia in international association football. It is fielded by Football Australia, the governing body of soccer in Australia, and competes as a member of the Asian Football Confederation (AFC), which encompasses the countries of Asia.

Australia have competed in numerous competitions, and all players who have played between four and nine, either as a member of the starting eleven or as a substitute, are listed below. Each player's details include his usual playing position while with the team, the number of caps earned and goals scored in all international matches, and details of the first and most recent matches played in. The names are initially ordered by date of debut, and then by alphabetical order. All statistics are correct up to and including the match played against Lebanon on 21 March 2024.

== Key ==
Player
This colour background and the * symbol indicate that the player was active at club level and eligible to play for Australia on the date specified above.

Positions key
pre–1960s		1960s–present	
GK	Goalkeeper		
FB	Full back	DF	Defender
HB	Half back	MF	Midfielder
FW	Forward		

Position
Playing positions are listed according to the tactical formations that were employed at the time. Thus the change in the names of defensive and midfield positions reflects the tactical evolution that occurred from the 1960s onwards.
Caps and goals
Caps and goals comprise those in the FIFA World Cup, OFC Nations Cup, AFC Asian Cup, their associated qualification matches and international friendly tournaments and matches.

== Players ==
Australia national soccer team players with 4 to 9 caps
Player	Pos.	Caps	Goals	Debut		Last or most recent match		Refs.
Player	Pos.	Caps	Goals	Date	Opponent	Date	Opponent	Refs.
William Maunder	FW	9	6	17 June 1922	New Zealand	12 July 1924	Canada	
Harry Robertson	FW	9	2	14 June 1950	Rhodesia	4 September 1954	New Zealand	
Pat Hughes	DF	9	0	21 November 1965	North Korea	3 June 1967	Scotland	
Nigel Shepherd	DF	9	0	21 November 1965	North Korea	3 June 1967	Scotland	
Dick van Alphen	DF	9	0	5 November 1967	New Zealand	4 April 1968	Japan	
Martyn Crook	GK	9	0	27 November 1979	Taiwan	27 February 1983	New Zealand	
Gary van Egmond	DF	9	0	20 September 1988	Brazil	16 April 1989	Israel	
Gabriel Mendez	MF	9	0	24 September 1994	Kuwait	12 June 2000	Paraguay	
Goran Lozanovski	MF	9	0	10 February 1996	Japan	4 October 1998	New Zealand	
Bruce Djite	FW	9	0	22 March 2008	Singapore	11 August 2010	Slovenia	
Marco Tilio *	FW	9	0	27 January 2022	Vietnam	23 January 2024	Uzbekistan	
Tom Thompson		8	0	17 June 1922	New Zealand	26 July 1924	Canada	
Lex Gibb	HB	8	0	10 September 1938	India	14 August 1948	New Zealand	
Jim Cunningham		8	6	10 May 1947	South Africa	11 September 1948	New Zealand	
Ron Hughes		8	0	24 May 1947	South Africa	11 September 1949	New Zealand	
Bill Wilson		8	0	24 May 1947	South Africa	24 September 1955	South Africa	
Bob Bignall	FB	8	0	28 August 1954	New Zealand	12 December 1956	India	
Cliff Sander	MF	8	0	28 August 1954	New Zealand	12 December 1956	India	
Frank Loughran	MF	8	2	3 September 1955	South Africa	23 August 1958	New Zealand	
Jimmy Fraser	GK	8	0	18 February 1973	Bulgaria	13 November 1973	South Korea	
Alan Niven	DF	8	0	26 June 1981	Fiji	27 February 1983	New Zealand	
Dominic Longo	DF	8	0	30 May 1993	New Zealand	4 October 1998	New Zealand	
Joe Spiteri	FW	8	2	24 June 1995	Ghana	6 June 1998	Croatia	
Mark Babic	DF	8	0	18 January 1997	New Zealand	4 October 1998	New Zealand	
Luke Casserly	DF	8	0	18 January 1997	New Zealand	15 August 2001	Japan	
Eugene Galekovic	GK	8	0	28 January 2009	Indonesia	25 July 2013	Japan	
Mitchell Langerak	GK	8	0	11 October 2013	France	13 June 2017	Brazil	
Roy Crowhurst		7	2	5 June 1933	New Zealand	24 September 1938	India	
Jimmy Osborne		7	0	24 June 1933	New Zealand	24 September 1938	India	
Jim Wilkinson		7	3	4 July 1936	New Zealand	1 October 1938	India	
Frank Parsons	FW	7	15	14 August 1947	New Zealand	22 July 1950	South Africa	
Billy Cook	DF	7	0	24 November 1965	North Korea	31 May 1967	Scotland	
Danny Walsh		7	0	20 July 1969	Greece	14 December 1969	Israel	
Chris Kalantzis	MF	7	1	3 August 1986	Czechoslovakia	21 June 1987	South Korea	
Alan Hunter	DF	7	0	6 August 1986	Czechoslovakia	23 March 1988	New Zealand	
Vlado Bozinovski	MF	7	1	7 July 1988	Brazil	21 June 1992	Uruguay	
Robert Enes	MF	7	0	28 October 1996	Tahiti	17 June 1997	Solomon Islands	
Chris Coyne	DF	7	0	7 June 2008	Iraq	10 June 2009	Bahrain	
Oliver Bozanic *	MF	7	0	15 October 2013	Canada	30 March 2015	Macedonia	
Bruno Fornaroli *	FW	7	0	24 March 2022	Japan	2 February 2024	South Korea	
Cameron Burgess *	DF	7	0	9 September 2023	Mexico	21 March 2024	Lebanon	
Alex Gibb	HB	6	0	17 June 1922	New Zealand	30 June 1923	New Zealand	
Dave Ward		6	5	17 June 1922	New Zealand	26 July 1924	Canada	
Judy Masters	FW	6	5	30 June 1923	New Zealand	26 July 1924	Canada	
Alec Cameron	FW	6	6	5 June 1933	New Zealand	18 July 1936	New Zealand	
Jack Hughes		6	10	17 June 1933	New Zealand	1 October 1938	India	
Jock Parkes		6	0	5 June 1933	New Zealand	24 September 1938	India	
George Smith	FW	6	16	5 June 1933	New Zealand	18 July 1936	New Zealand	
Eric Hulme		6	4	14 June 1950	Rhodesia	22 July 1950	South Africa	
Bob Young		6	0	14 June 1950	Rhodesia	22 July 1950	South Africa	
Bill Henderson	GK	6	0	28 August 1954	New Zealand	12 December 1956	India	
Jack Lennard		6	1	28 August 1954	New Zealand	12 December 1956	India	
Les Scheinflug		6	4	21 November 1965	North Korea	4 April 1968	Japan	
Frank Micic	MF	6	1	5 November 1967	New Zealand	21 November 1971	Israel	
Dave Todd		6	1	21 November 1965	North Korea	8 December 1965	Malaysia	
Roy Blitz	FW	6	0	24 November 1965	North Korea	4 April 1968	Japan	
Hamilton McMeechan		6	0	26 November 1965	Cambodia	31 March 1968	Japan	
Roger Romanowicz		6	0	5 November 1967	New Zealand	21 November 1971	Israel	
Willie Rutherford	FW	6	1	20 October 1969	South Korea	14 December 1969	Israel	
Jimmy Cant	MF	6	1	12 June 1983	England	18 December 1983	Singapore	
Brad Maloney	MF	6	2	25 September 1998	Fiji	15 February 2000	Bulgaria	
Troy Halpin	MF	6	1	7 February 1998	Chile	4 October 1998	New Zealand	
Alvin Ceccoli	DF	6	1	25 September 1998	Fiji	16 August 2006	Kuwait	
Michael Petkovic	GK	6	0	28 February 2001	Colombia	22 June 2008	China	
Angelo Costanzo	DF	6	1	28 February 2001	Colombia	14 July 2002	New Zealand	
Ante Milicic	FW	6	5	6 July 2002	Vanuatu	29 March 2005	Indonesia	
Tom Pondeljak	MF	6	0	6 July 2002	Vanuatu	5 March 2009	Kuwait	
Max Vieri	FW	6	0	21 May 2004	Turkey	9 February 2005	South Africa	
Ljubo Milicevic	DF	6	0	29 March 2005	Indonesia	6 September 2006	Kuwait	
Brad Jones *	GK	6	0	2 June 2007	Uruguay	9 June 2018	Hungary	
Ben Halloran *	MF	6	0	26 May 2014	South Africa	4 September 2014	Belgium	
Daniel Arzani *	MF	6	1	1 June 2018	Czech Republic	15 October 2018	Kuwait	
Denis Genreau *	MF	6	0	7 June 2021	Chinese Taipei	9 September 2023	Mexico	
Lewis Miller *	DF	6	0	13 October 2023	England	2 February 2024	South Korea	
Gilbert Storey	HB	5	0	30 June 1923	New Zealand	12 July 1924	Canada	
Reg Date	FW	5	8	10 May 1947	South Africa	14 June 1947	South Africa	
Charlie Stewart		5	3	10 May 1947	South Africa	1 October 1955	South Africa	
Bruce Morrow		5	0	27 November 1956	Japan	4 June 1967	Scotland	
Billy Rice		5	0	21 November 1965	North Korea	26 July 1969	Greece	
Ray Lloyd		5	0	21 November 1967	Singapore	26 July 1969	Greece	
David Jones		5	0	13 November 1977	Singapore	9 February 1980	Czechoslovakia	
Jim Muir	FW	5	0	20 February 1980	England	24 August 1980	Mexico	
Robert Wheatley	DF	5	0	10 June 1981	Taiwan	2 November 1986	New Zealand	
Marshall Soper	FW	5	0	22 February 1983	New Zealand	10 August 1986	Czechoslovakia	
Andrew Koczka	MF	5	0	9 March 1988	Taiwan	2 April 1989	New Zealand	
Ryan Griffiths	FW	5	0	9 October 2005	Jamaica	22 March 2008	Singapore	
Mitch Nichols *	MF	5	0	25 March 2009	Kuwait	18 November 2014	Japan	
Joshua Brillante *	MF	5	0	28 July 2013	China	14 October 2014	Qatar	
Kenneth Dougall *	FW	5	0	3 June 2021	Kuwait	1 June 2022	Jordan	
Garang Kuol *	FW	5	1	25 September 2022	New Zealand	28 March 2023	Ecuador	
Ryan Strain *	DF	5	0	25 September 2022	New Zealand	21 November 2023	Palestine	
Samuel Silvera *	FW	5	0	9 September 2023	Mexico	18 January 2024	Syria	
Kusini Yengi *	FW	5	0	16 November 2023	Bangladesh	21 March 2024	Lebanon	
Peter Doyle	DF	4	0	17 June 1922	New Zealand	30 June 1923	New Zealand	
Tommy Oliver	DF	4	0	7 June 1924	Canada	26 July 1924	Canada	
Harry Spurway	DF	4	0	14 June 1924	Canada	26 July 1924	Canada	
Ray Bryant		4	1	4 July 1936	New Zealand	24 September 1938	India	
Alec Heaney		4	0	10 May 1947	South Africa	24 September 1938	India	
Ken Hough (Note: Also has been capped for New Zealand (5 caps in 1958).)	GK	4	0	14 August 1947	New Zealand	11 September 1948	New Zealand	
George Sanders		4	2	14 June 1950	Rhodesia	1 September 1950	South Africa	
John Pettigrew		4	0	1 October 1955	South Africa	12 December 1956	India	
Alwyn Warren		4	0	1 October 1955	South Africa	12 December 1956	India	
Garry Manuel	FW	4	0	10 October 1969	Japan	28 May 1975	Israel	
George Blues	MF	4	1	4 November 1970	Iran	1 December 1970	Mexico	
Mike Denton		4	0	4 November 1970	Iran	1 December 1970	Mexico	
John Roche	DF	4	0	4 November 1970	Iran	1 December 1970	Mexico	
Alan Ainslie	FW	4	1	11 November 1971	Israel	11 August 1976	Hong Kong	
Arno Bertogna	MF	4	0	27 November 1979	Taiwan	11 November 1980	Greece	
John Coyne	FW	4	0	27 November 1979	Taiwan	24 August 1980	Mexico	
Tommy Cumming	FW	4	1	27 November 1979	Taiwan	9 February 1980	Czechoslovakia	
Jim Campbell		4	1	27 January 1980	Czechoslovakia	18 December 1983	Singapore	
Steve Hogg	DF	4	0	26 February 1980	Papua New Guinea	7 December 1980	Indonesia	
Ange Postecoglou	DF	4	0	3 August 1986	Czechoslovakia	16 October 1988	New Zealand	
Kimon Taliadoros	FW	4	0	25 August 1990	Indonesia	26 September 1993	South Korea	
Abbas Saad	MF	4	0	11 August 1992	Malaysia	15 February 1998	Japan	
Pablo Cardozo	FW	4	1	12 February 2000	Slovakia	23 June 2000	Solomon Islands	
Clint Bolton	GK	4	0	12 June 2000	Paraguay	16 August 2006	Kuwait	
Bobby Despotovski	FW	4	5	6 July 2002	Vanuatu	14 July 2002	New Zealand	
Ante Juric	DF	4	1	8 July 2002	New Caledonia	14 July 2002	New Zealand	
Joel Porter	FW	4	5	8 July 2002	New Caledonia	14 July 2002	New Zealand	
Nikolai Topor-Stanley	DF	4	0	22 March 2008	Singapore	14 October 2014	Qatar	
Scott Jamieson	DF	4	0	28 February 2009	Indonesia	9 December 2012	Taiwan	
Matt Thompson	MF	4	0	28 February 2009	Indonesia	3 March 2010	Indonesia	
Danny Vukovic *	GK	4	0	27 March 2018	Colombia	7 June 2021	Chinese Taipei	
Andrew Redmayne *	GK	4	0	7 June 2019	South Korea	25 September 2022	New Zealand	
Joel King *	DF	4	0	27 January 2022	Vietnam	25 September 2022	New Zealand	
Gethin Jones *	DF	4	0	6 January 2024	Bahrain	28 January 2024	Indonesia	

== See also ==
- List of Australia international soccer players with one cap
- List of Australia international soccer players (2–3 caps)
- List of Australia international soccer players (10+ caps)
