= Australia men's national soccer team results (1922–1949) =

This is a list of the Australia men's national soccer team results from its origin in 1922 to 1949.

== 1920s ==
=== 1922 ===
17 June International Friendly	New Zealand	3–1	Australia	Dunedin, New Zealand
Match 1	Cook 20', ?'; Knott ?'	Report	Maunder 45'	Stadium: Carisbrook Park; Attendance: 10,000~; Referee: M. Thornley (New Zealand)

24 June International Friendly	New Zealand	1–1	Australia	Wellington, New Zealand
Match 2	Cook 10'	Report	Bratton 25'	Stadium: Athletic Park; Attendance: 12,000; Referee: R.S. Lithgrow (New Zealand)

8 July International Friendly	New Zealand	3–1	Australia	Auckland, New Zealand
Match 3	Ballard 5'; Cook 10'; Dacre ?'	Report	Brown ?'	Stadium: Carlaw Park; Attendance: 15,000; Referee: L.C.H. Dawson (New Zealand)

=== 1923 ===
9 June International Friendly	Australia	2–1	New Zealand	Brisbane, Australia
Match 4	Lennard 7'; Maunder 90'	Report	Dacre 57'	Stadium: Brisbane Cricket Ground; Attendance: 7,000; Referee: M. Thornley (New Zealand)

16 June International Friendly	Australia	2–3	New Zealand	Sydney, Australia
Match 5	Lennard ?'; Gilmore ?'	Report	Campbell ?', ?', ?'	Stadium: Sydney Cricket Ground; Attendance: 10,000; Referee: A. Jackson (Australia)

30 June International Friendly	Australia	1–4	New Zealand	Newcastle, Australia
Match 6	Maunder ?'	Report	Campbell 46', 51', ?', ?'	Stadium: Newcastle Showground; Attendance: 14,000; Referee: LB Tamlyn (Australia)

=== 1924 ===
7 June International Friendly	Australia	3–2	Canada	Brisbane, Australia
Match 7	Ward 38'; Masters 60', 80'	Report	Linning 25'; Forrest 81'	Stadium: Brisbane Cricket Ground; Attendance: 10,000

14 June International Friendly	Australia	0–1	Canada	Sydney, Australia
Match 8		Report	Stobbart ?'	Stadium: Royal Agricultural Showground; Attendance: 8,000; Referee: W. Allerton (Australia)

23 June International Friendly	Australia	4–1	Canada	Sydney, Australia
Match 9	Masters ?', ?'; Maunder ?', ?'	Report	Forrest ?'	Stadium: Royal Agricultural Showground; Attendance: 7,000~; Referee: W.A. Wright (Australia)

28 June International Friendly	Australia	0–0	Canada	Newcastle, Australia
Match 10		Report		Stadium: Newcastle Showground; Attendance: 10,000; Referee: J. Nicholson (Australia)

12 July International Friendly	Australia	1–4	Canada	Adelaide, Australia
Match 11	Maunder ?'	Report	Wilson ?', ?'; Linning 41'; Stobbart ?' (pen.)	Stadium: Jubilee Oval; Attendance: 5,000~; Referee: G.A. Childs (Australia)

26 July International Friendly	Australia	1–0	Canada	Sydney, Australia
Match 12	Masters ?'	Report		Stadium: Royal Agricultural Showground; Attendance: 8,000; Referee: J. Nicholson (Australia)

== 1930s ==
=== 1933 ===
5 June International Friendly	Australia	4–2	New Zealand	Brisbane, Australia
Match 13	Smith 20', ?'; Gorring ?', 80'	Report	Kershaw 55'; Chapman ?'	Stadium: Brisbane Exhibition Ground; Attendance: 5,000; Referee: Z. Korotcoff (Australia)

17 June International Friendly	Australia	6–4	New Zealand	Sydney, Australia
Match 14	G. Smith ?', ?', ?'; Crowhurst ?'; Cameron ?'; Hughes ?'	Report		Stadium: Sydney Cricket Ground; Attendance: 5,000; Referee: D. Quinn (Australia)

24 June International Friendly	Australia	4–2	New Zealand	Sydney, Australia
Match 15	Edwards ?'; Crowhurst ?'; G. Smith ?', ?'	Report	Kershaw ?' (pen.), ?'	Stadium: Sydney Cricket Ground; Referee: D. Quinn (Australia)

=== 1936 ===
4 July International Friendly	New Zealand	1–7	Australia	Dunedin, New Zealand
Match 16	Skinner ?' (pen.)	Report	Smith ?', ?', ?', ?'; Price ?', ?'; Cameron ?'	Stadium: Logan Park; Attendance: 8,000; Referee: W.P. Smith (New Zealand)

11 July International Friendly	New Zealand	0–10	Australia	Wellington, New Zealand
Match 17		Report	Smith 32', ?', 53', ?', ?'; Price 9', ?'; Cameron 28', 48'; Donaldson ?'	Stadium: Basin Reserve; Attendance: 8,000; Referee: G. Jackson (New Zealand)

18 July International Friendly	New Zealand	1–4	Australia	Auckland, New Zealand
Match 18	Haggett ?'	Report	Cameron ?', ?'; Price ?', ?'	Stadium: Blandford Park; Attendance: 2,000; Referee: A. Firth (New Zealand)

=== 1938 ===
3 September International Friendly	Australia	5–3	India	Sydney, Australia
	Quill ?', ?'; Hughes ?', ?'; Wilkinson ?'	Report	A. Rahim ?'; Bhattacharya ?'; Lumsden ?'	Stadium: Royal Agricultural Showground; Attendance: 16,144

10 September International Friendly	Australia	4–4	India	Brisbane, Australia
	Hughes ?', ?'; Kitching ?'; Brittain ?'	Report	Rahim 47'; Bhattacharya 49'; Mohammed ?'; Lumsden ?'	Stadium: Brisbane Exhibition Ground; Attendance: 16,000; Referee: J. Edwards (Australia)

17 September International Friendly	Australia	1–4	India	Newcastle, Australia
	Hughes ?'	Report	A. Rahim ?'; Lumsden ?', 46' (pen.); Bhattacharya ?'	Stadium: Newcastle Sports Ground; Attendance: 9,000

24 September International Friendly	Australia	5–4	India	Sydney, Australia
	Hughes ?', ?'; Wilkinson ?', ?'; Bryant ?'	Report	K. Prosad; Lumsden ?', ?', ?' (pen.)	Stadium: Royal Agricultural Showground; Attendance: 12,000

1 October International Friendly	Australia	3–1	India	Melbourne, Australia
	J. Hughes ?', ?'; Coolahan ?'; McIver ?'	Report	Lumsden ?'	Stadium: Melbourne Cricket Ground; Referee: F.R. Thorpe (Australia)

== 1940s ==
=== 1947 ===
10 May International Friendly	Australia	1–2	South Africa	Sydney, Australia
	Date 4'	Report	Anley 65'; Wilson 87' (pen.)	Stadium: Sydney Cricket Ground; Attendance: 38,312; Referee: William McWilliams (Australia)

24 May International Friendly	Australia	2–4	South Africa	Brisbane, Australia
	Date ?' (pen.), 80'	Report	Anley ?', ?'; Smethurst ?'; Wilson ?'	Stadium: Brisbane Cricket Ground; Attendance: 15,000; Referee: Tom Boyd (Australia)

31 May International Friendly	Australia	3–3	South Africa	Sydney, Australia
	Date ?' (pen.), 80'	Report	Cunningham 44'; Date ?', 75'	Stadium: Sydney Cricket Ground; Attendance: 20,000; Referee: William McWilliams (Australia)

7 June International Friendly	Australia	5–1	South Africa	Newcastle, Australia
	Date ?', ?', ?'; Hughes ?'; Kemp ?'	Report	Wilson ?'	Stadium: Newcastle Sports Ground; Attendance: 18,442; Referee: William McWilliams (Australia)

14 June International Friendly	Australia	1–2	South Africa	Sydney, Australia
	Cunningham 3'	Report	Anley 7', 70'	Stadium: Royal Agricultural Showground; Referee: William McWilliams (Australia)

=== 1948 ===
14 August International Friendly	New Zealand	0–6	Australia	Wellington, New Zealand
		Report	Parsons ?', ?', ?'; Hughes ?', ?'; Cunningham ?'	Stadium: Basin Reserve; Attendance: Referee: V. Wheeler (New Zealand)

28 August International Friendly	New Zealand	0–7	Australia	Christchurch, New Zealand
		Report	Parsons ?', ?', ?'; Hughes ?', ?'; Cunningham ?'; Johns ?'	Stadium: Lancaster Park; Referee: T. Gottermeyer (New Zealand)

4 September International Friendly	New Zealand	0–4	Australia	Wellington, New Zealand
		Report	Johns ?', ?'; Hughes ?'; Lawrie ?'	Stadium: Basin Reserve; Attendance: 3,000; Referee: J. Sanderson (New Zealand)

11 September International Friendly	New Zealand	1–8	Australia	Auckland, New Zealand
	Masters ?'	Report	Parsons ?', ?', ?', ?', ?', ?'; Cunningham ?'; Hughes ?'	Stadium: Blandford Park; Attendance: 7,000; Referee: C.G. Edwards (New Zealand)

== See also ==
- Australia men's national soccer team results (2020–present)
- Australia men's national soccer team results (2000–2019)
- Australia men's national soccer team results (1980–1999)
- Australia men's national soccer team results (1950–1979)
- Australia men's national soccer team results (unofficial matches)
- Australia men's national soccer B team matches
