= Alwyn Warren =

Alwyn Warren may refer to:

- Alwyn Warren (bishop) (1900–1988), Anglican bishop in New Zealand
- Alwyn Warren (soccer) (1931–2004), Australian football (soccer) player
