= Frank Gallen =

Australian soccer player

Personal information
- Full name: Frank Gallen
- Position: Right-back

Senior career*
Years	Team	Apps	(Gls)
- Balmain Gladstone

International career
1924	Australia	4	(1)
- * Club domestic league appearances and goals

Frank Gallen was a former Australian professional soccer player who played as a forward and as a selective for the Australia national soccer team in 1924. He is nicknamed Pocket Hercules.

== Club career ==
From the start of the 1920s, Gallen joined Balmain Gladstone, where he was part of their squad who won a Premiership in 1921 and was promoted to the top-tier league in 1922. He left Balmain Gladstone halfway through the 1920s.

== International career ==
Gallen began his international career with Australia on their six-match tour against Canada. He debuted in a 3–2 win over Canada on 7 June 1924. He was also selected as part of Australia XI's squad tour against the English FA touring side.

== Career statistics ==
=== International ===
National team	Year	Competitive		Friendly		Total	
National team	Year	Apps	Goals	Apps	Goals	Apps	Goals
Australia	1924	0	0	4	0	4	0
