= Charlie Leabeater =

Australian footballer

Personal information
- Full name: Charlie Leabeater
- Place of birth: Sydney, Australia
- Position: Full-back

Senior career*
Years	Team	Apps	(Gls)
- Granville
- Wentworthville

International career
1924	Australia	2	(0)
- * Club domestic league appearances and goals

Charlie Leabeater was an Australian soccer player who played as a full-back. He played for Granville and the Australia national team. He was also a cricket player, rugby player and swimmer.

== International career ==
Leabeater played two international matches for Australia, debuting in a 4–1 win against Canada on 23 June 1924 and playing his final match in a 1–0 win against Canada on 26 July 1924.

== Career statistics ==
=== International ===
National team	Year	Competitive		Friendly		Total	
National team	Year	Apps	Goals	Apps	Goals	Apps	Goals
Australia	1924	0	0	2	0	2	0

== Honours ==
Granville

- Sydney Metropolitan First Division: 1923, 1924, 1925
