= Donald Wilson (South African soccer) =

South African footballer

International career
Years	Team	Apps	(Gls)
1947	South Africa	9	(11)

Donald Wilson was a South African footballer. He featured in a number of games for the South Africa national soccer team in 1947, scoring eleven times in nine appearances.

== Career statistics ==
=== International ===
Appearances and goals by national team and year
National team	Year	Apps	Goals
South Africa	1947	9	11
Total		9	11

=== International goals ===
Scores and results list South Africa's goal tally first.

No	Date	Venue	Opponent	Score	Result	Competition
1.	10 May 1947	Cricket Ground, Sydney, Australia	Australia	?–?	2–1	Friendly
2.	24 May 1947	Cricket Ground, Brisbane, Australia	Australia	?–?	4–2	Friendly
3.	7 June 1947	Sports Ground, Newcastle, Australia	Australia	?–?	5–1	Friendly
4.	5 July 1947	Carisbrook, Dunedin, New Zealand	New Zealand	?–0	6–0	Friendly
5.	5 July 1947	Carisbrook, Dunedin, New Zealand	New Zealand	?–0	6–0	Friendly
6.	5 July 1947	Carisbrook, Dunedin, New Zealand	New Zealand	?–0	6–0	Friendly
7.	12 July 1947	Athletic Park, Wellington, New Zealand	New Zealand	?–?	8–3	Friendly
8.	12 July 1947	Athletic Park, Wellington, New Zealand	New Zealand	?–?	8–3	Friendly
9.	12 July 1947	Athletic Park, Wellington, New Zealand	New Zealand	?–?	8–3	Friendly
10.	12 July 1947	Athletic Park, Wellington, New Zealand	New Zealand	?–?	8–3	Friendly
11.	19 July 1947	Eden Park, Auckland, New Zealand	New Zealand	?–?	4–1	Friendly
