= Henry Sherringham =

Australian soccer player

Personal information
- Full name: Henry Sherringham
- Place of birth: Sydney, Australia
- Position: Inside left

Youth career
- Pyrmont Rangers

Senior career*
Years	Team	Apps	(Gls)
1916–1918	Pyrmont Rangers		
1919	YMCA		
1920–1924	Sydney		
1925	St George		

International career
1924	Australia	2	(0)
- * Club domestic league appearances and goals

Henry Sherringham was a former Australian professional soccer player who played as a forward and played for the Australia.

== International career ==
Sherringham began his international career with Australia in an inside-left position against Canada in a 3–2 win on 7 June 1924. He played his second and last international match against in a 0–1 loss to Canada.

== Career statistics ==
=== International ===
National team	Year	Competitive		Friendly		Total	
National team	Year	Apps	Goals	Apps	Goals	Apps	Goals
Australia	1924	0	0	2	0	2	0
Career total		0	0	2	0	2	0
