= George Keith (soccer) =

Footballer (born 1944)

Personal information
- Date of birth: 26 May 1944 (age 82)
- Place of birth: Scotland
- Position: Defender

Senior career*
Years	Team	Apps	(Gls)
1961–1962	Greenock Morton	1	(0)
1962–1963	Guildford City	0	(0)
1963–1964	Ayr	1	(0)
1964–1965	Third Lanark	1	(0)
1965–1968	Melbourne Hakoah	70	(4)
1969–1974	APIA Leichhardt		(0)

International career
1967–1969	Australia	25	(0)
- * Club domestic league appearances and goals

George Keith (born 26 May 1944) is a former footballer who played as a defender. Born in Scotland, he represented Australia in the late 1960s. Keith is a member of the Football Federation Australia - Football Hall of Fame.

== Club career ==
From 1959 to 1961 Arsenal F.C. signed Keith as an apprentice professional footballer, after Arsenal's chief scout saw him playing for Glasgow Schoolboys v London Schoolboys at Wembley Stadium. At the end of his term with Arsenal he returned to Scotland to take up a professional career with Greenock Morton and Third Lanark in the Scottish Division One.

In 1965 Keith migrated to Australia where he played for Melbourne Hakoah and A.P.I.A. Leichhardt. Keith also represented Victoria and New South Wales.

== International career ==
Keith in 1967 made his debut for the Australia national team. He played 22 times, including 20 in full internationals, for the Socceroos, playing in the unsuccessful Australian qualification for the 1970 FIFA World Cup.

== Honours ==
Melbourne Hakoah

- Dockerty Cup: 1966

Australia

- South Vietnam Independence Cup: 1967

Individual
In 2008 Keith was inducted into the Football Federation Australia - Football Hall of Fame in the Award of Distinction category.
In 2013, Keith was named in Australia's team of the decade for the years 1963–1970.
