= Con Purser =

Australian soccer player (1931–2026)

Personal information
- Full name: Conrad Purser
- Date of birth: 2 August 1931
- Place of birth: Collie, Western Australia, Australia
- Date of death: 6 October 2026 (aged 95)

Senior career*
Years	Team	Apps	(Gls)
- North Perth

International career
1955	Australia	1	(0)
- * Club domestic league appearances and goals

Conrad Purser (2 August 1931 – 6 October 2026) was an Australian association football player.

== Playing career ==
Purser played his club football for North Perth in the Western Australian state league where he played 13 seasons, five as captain.

He played twice for Australia, once in a full international match against South Africa and once against Hungarian club team Ferencváros.

Purser was the first West Australian to be selected for an Olympics Football squad, making the 1956 Melbourne team. He represented WA 18 times being captain on 9 occasions. He was also State player/coach in 1957–58. He was inducted into the Hall of Champions in 1996 and included in the Century of Champions

Purser died on 6 October 2026, at the age of 95.
