= Alan Garside =

Australian soccer player (1926–2021)

Personal information
- Date of birth: 29 September 1926
- Place of birth: Sydney, Australia
- Date of death: 23 May 2021 (aged 94)
- Position: Forward

Senior career*
Years	Team	Apps	(Gls)
1937–1942	Granville Kewpies		
1943-1958	Granville Magpies		

International career
1955	Australia	1	(0)
- * Club domestic league appearances and goals

Alan Garside (29 September 1926 – 23 May 2021) was an Australian soccer player who played as a forward for Granville and the Australian national team. He received a cap for his appearance and a 2020–2021 Socceroos jersey with his name on the back.

== International career ==
Garside played his first and only international match against South Africa on 1 October 1955.

== Honours ==
Granville

- NSW Division One South Premiership: 1952
