= Cecil Williams (soccer) =

Australian soccer player

Personal information
- Place of birth: Cessnock, Australia
- Position: Forward

Senior career*
Years	Team	Apps	(Gls)
192?–1930	Cessnock		
1930–1933	Leichhardt-Annandale		
1933–1937	St George		
1938	Leichhardt-Annandale		

International career
1924	Australia	2	(0)
- * Club domestic league appearances and goals

Cecil Williams was an Australian soccer player who played as forward for Cessnock for most of his career and the Australia national team. He played with Leichhardt-Annandale and St George after his time at Cessnock.

== International career ==
Williams played two matches for Australia in a 0–0 draw and a 4–1 loss both to Canada in June 1924.

== Career statistics ==
=== International ===
Team	Year	Competitive		Friendly		Total	
Team	Year	Apps	Goals	Apps	Goals	Apps	Goals
Australia	1924	0	0	2	0	2	0

== Honours ==
Cessnock

- Northern Premiership: 1925, 1926, 1927
- NSW State Premiership: 1928, 1929
