= Henry Maunder =

Australian soccer player

Personal information
- Place of birth: Newcastle, Australia
- Positions: Full-back; centre-forward

Youth career
- West Wallsend

Senior career*
Years	Team	Apps	(Gls)
1920–1926	West Wallsend		
1927–1929	Kurri Kurri		
1930	Wallsend		
1931	West Wallsend		
1932	Kurri Kurri		

International career
1924	Australia	1	(0)
- * Club domestic league appearances and goals

Henry Maunder was an Australian soccer player who played as full-back for Newcastle clubs and the Australia national team. His senior career varied between three clubs based in Newcastle; West Wallsend, Kurri Kurri and Wallsend. He won three Northern NSW Premierships and four Gardiner Cups.

== Club career ==
=== Kurri Kurri ===
Maunder signed for Kurri Kurri on 2 April 1927 prior to their match against Aberdare. He was signed on for the 1928 season on 20 March 1928. During his time at Kurri Kurri; on 9 May 1928, he along with three other Kurri Kurri players applied to play in West Wallsend's association team which met with mishap to Northern NSW State League clubs since they had all played for Kurri Kurri, as this application was confirmed.

=== Wallsend ===
Maunder had moved to Wallsend for the 1930 season after his leaving of Kurri Kurri. In the 1930 NSW State Cup series quarter-final match in a 1–0 defeat against Adamstown Rosebud on 19 July 1930, Maunder had rushed opponent Alec Cameron with his fists causing him and Cameron to be sent off following the crowd breaking onto the field with referee Dan Quinn taking charge. On 5 August 1930, Wallsend sought to reopen the case of Maunder who had been handed a two-week spell.

== International career ==
Maunder played once for Australia; that match being a 0–0 draw against Canada on 28 June 1924.

== Personal life ==
Henry was the brother of William Maunder, who also played for the Australia national team.

== Career statistics ==
=== International ===
Team	Year	Competitive		Friendly		Total	
Team	Year	Apps	Goals	Apps	Goals	Apps	Goals
Australia	1924	0	0	1	0	1	0
