= Brett Woods =

Australian soccer player (born 1963)

Personal information
- Date of birth: 4 April 1963 (age 63)
- Position: Defender

Senior career*
Years	Team	Apps	(Gls)
- Sydney City
- Sydney United

International career
1981	Australia	1	(0)
- * Club domestic league appearances and goals

Brett Woods (born 4 April 1963) is an Australian former soccer player who played as a defender.

== Career ==
Woods played his club football for Sydney City and Sydney United in the National Soccer League.

In 1981, he played one match for Australia against Indonesia.
