= Rene Colusso =

Australian soccer player

Personal information
- Full name: Renato Colusso
- Date of birth: 19 August 1956 (age 70)
- Place of birth: Sydney, Australia
- Position: Forward

Youth career
- 1975: Torino

Senior career*
Years	Team	Apps	(Gls)
1974	Marconi		
1975–1976	Ivrea		
1976–1977	Pisa		
1977–1980	Arezzo		
1981–1982	Alessandria		
1982–1984	Akragas		
1986	Castelfiorentino		

International career
1975	Australia	1	(0)
- * Club domestic league appearances and goals

Renato "Rene" Colusso (born 19 August 1956 in Sydney, Australia) is an Australian former association football player.

== Playing career ==
=== Club career ===
Colusso played his early football for Marconi Stallions in the New South Wales State League.

In 1975, he moved to Italy where he initially played youth team football for Torino.

He then went on to play for Ivrea, becoming the first Australian to play professional football in Italy.

He moved to Pisa for the 1976/1977 season.

In 1977, he transferred to Arezzo where he played several seasons.

He later played for Alessandria, Akragas Calcio and Castelfiorentino.

=== International career ===
In 1975, he made his only full international appearance for Australia in a match against China.

== Management career ==
Colusso had stints as an assistant manager at Reggina and Avellino.
