= Sauro Iozzelli =

Australian soccer player (born 1957)

Personal information
- Date of birth: 27 February 1957 (age 69)
- Place of birth: Perth, Australia
- Position: Defender

Senior career*
Years	Team	Apps	(Gls)
- Brisbane City

International career
1978	Australia	1	(0)
- * Club domestic league appearances and goals

Sauro Iozzelli (born 27 February 1957) is an Australian former soccer player who played as a Defender. He played one match for Australia in 1978.
