= Tom Tennant (soccer) =

Australian soccer player and manager

Personal information
- Full name: Thomas Calder Tennant
- Place of birth: Carluke, Scotland
- Height: 5 ft 7 in (1.70 m)
- Position: Forward

Senior career*
Years	Team	Apps	(Gls)
1927–1929	Motherwell	14	(8)
1929–?	Metters		
1944–?	North Shore		

International career
1933	Australia	1	(0)

Managerial career
- 1953: Australia
- 1955: Australia
- * Club domestic league appearances and goals

Tom Tennant was an Australian soccer player and manager. He took charge of the Australia national soccer team in a full international match in 1955 as well as several matches against non-international teams in 1953 and 1955.

== Playing career ==
Tennant was born in Carluke in the Scottish county of Lanarkshire.

In 1927, he joined Motherwell, where he played 14 times in two seasons. Tennant moved to Australia in 1929, signing for Metters in Sydney.

In 1940, Tennant signed up for the Royal Australian Air Force (RAAF), which put a temporary pause to his footballing career.

Returning to Australia in 1944, Tennant joined Sydney team North Shore as a playing coach.

Tennant played one full international match for Australia in a 6–4 defeat of New Zealand in Sydney in 1933.

== Coaching career ==
After retiring from playing, Tennant became a coach, taking charge of his former club Metters in 1950.

Tennant was selected as Australia coach alongside Viv Chalwin for matches against a Hong Kong Chinese XI in 1953. In 1955, Tennant trained the Australia team for matches against touring Austrian club Rapid Vienna and Hong Kong team South China. He took charge of the Australia team that lost 6–0 to South Africa in September 1955.
