= Stan Bourke =

Australian soccer player

Personal information
- Full name: Stan Bourke
- Place of birth: Sydney, Australia
- Position: Outside right

Senior career*
Years	Team	Apps	(Gls)
1921–1922	Auburn District		
1923–1928	Granville		
1929	Gladesville-Ryde		
1930–1931	Granville		
1931	Balgownie		

International career
1924	Australia	3	(0)
- * Club domestic league appearances and goals

Stan Bourke was a former Australian professional soccer player who played as a forward. He had three caps for the Australia national soccer team.

== Early life ==
Stan Bourke was born in Auburn, Sydney, Australia. He was educated at Auburn North School and played in their football team.

== Club career ==
After playing for the Auburn North school team, he joined Auburn District in 1921. He joined Granville in 1923 and won three consecutive Sydney Metropolitan Premierships in his first three seasons. Bourke decided to leave Granville on 17 April 1928, after Granville was defeated by West Wallsend. He joined Gladesville-Ryde in 1929 and returned to Granville in 1930. He signed a form to play with Balgownie on 1 May 1931.

== International career ==
Bourke was part of Australia's team in their historic tour against Canada. He made his debut in a 0–1 loss to Canada at the Royal Agricultural Showground. On 23 June 1924, he played in his first international win in a 4–1 win against Canada. His final international match was on 26 July 1924 in a 1–0 win in Australia's last match in their 1924 tour.

== Personal life ==
=== Relationships ===
Stan Bourke was married on 17 May 1924 and spent their honeymoon at Woy Woy.

== Career statistics ==
=== International ===
National team	Year	Competitive		Friendly		Total	
National team	Year	Apps	Goals	Apps	Goals	Apps	Goals
Australia	1924	0	0	3	0	3	0
