= Mosie Burton =

Australian soccer player

Moses Burton
Personal information
- Place of birth: Ipswich, Australia
- Position: Forward

Senior career*
Years	Team	Apps	(Gls)
1922–1923	Bundamba		

International career
1923	Australia	1	(0)
- * Club domestic league appearances and goals

Mosie Burton was an Australian professional soccer player who played as a forward for Bundamba and the Australia national soccer team.

== International career ==
Burton played his first and only match for Australia in a 2–1 win over New Zealand in June 1923. This was to be Australia's first win in an international match.

== Career statistics ==
=== International ===
National team	Year	Competitive		Friendly		Total	
National team	Year	Apps	Goals	Apps	Goals	Apps	Goals
Australia	1923	0	0	1	0	1	0
