= George Forrest (soccer) =

Scottish footballer (1904–1986)

Personal information
- Full name: George Forrest
- Date of birth: July 21, 1904
- Place of birth: Wallyford, Scotland
- Date of death: May 22, 1986 (aged 81)
- Place of death: Philadelphia, United States
- Position: Inside forward

Senior career*
Years	Team	Apps	(Gls)
1919–1922	Heart of Midlothian	20	(0)
1922–1923	Alloa Athletic	27	(1)
1923–1924	Toronto Ulster United FC		
1924–1927	Bethlehem Steel	72	(25)
1927–1928	Heart of Midlothian	2	(0)
1928–1929	St Bernard's	17	(3)
1929–1930	York City		
1930–1931	Raith Rovers	10	(1)
1931–1933	Peterhead		
1933–1935	Plymouth Argyle	3	(0)
1935–1936	Mansfield Town		

International career
1924	Canada	7	(2)
- * Club domestic league appearances and goals

George Forrest (July 21, 1904 – May 22, 1986) was a soccer player who played for the Canada men's national soccer team. Born in Scotland, he represented Canada at international level.

== Career ==
Forrest began his career with Scotland with Heart of Midlothian and Alloa Athletic. After spending a year in Canada with Toronto Ulster United FC, in 1924 he signed with Bethlehem Steel of the American Soccer League. He played two seasons with Bethlehem, but was released following the 1925–26 season. He returned to Canada where he briefly played again for Ulster. In September 1926, Bethlehem brought him back into the team for a third season. He then played for several clubs in England and Scotland over the next eight years.

Forrest played for Canada in their 1924 tour of Australia and New Zealand: In six games against Australia, Forrest scored twice as the Canadians split the series at two wins a piece. He played in Canada's first official match on June 7, 1924, against Australia, where he also scored Canada's second-ever goal. A week later Canada drew with New Zealand 1–1 in Auckland.
