= Albert De Paoli =

Australian soccer player

Albert De Paoli (born 1932) is an Australian former association football player.

== Playing career ==
=== Club career ===
De Paoli scored on debut for Leichhardt-Annandale as an 18-year-old in July 1950. He later represented APIA Leichhardt.

=== International career ===
De Paoli played one match for Australia in 1955.
