= John Pettigrew (soccer) =

Australian soccer player

Personal information
- Full name: John Pettigrew
- Date of birth: 31 October 1934
- Date of death: 19 December 2014 (aged 80)

Senior career*
Years	Team	Apps	(Gls)
	Cessnock	?	(?)
	Prague	?	(?)

International career^{‡}
1955–1956	Australia	4	(0)
- * Club domestic league appearances and goals as of 4 February 2015 ‡ National team caps and goals as of 4 February 2015

John Pettigrew (31 October 1934 – 19 December 2014) was an Australian soccer player.

Pettigrew made his debut for Australia in October 1955 against South Africa in Newcastle. In 1956 he played in Australia's two matches at the 1956 Olympic Games. His fourth and final match for the national team was a friendly again India in December 1956. Pettigrew died in 2014 aged 80.
