= Doug Wendt =

Australian soccer player (1927–2019)

Personal information
- Full name: Douglas James Wendt
- Date of birth: 1927
- Place of birth: Newcastle, New South Wales, Australia
- Date of death: 1 February 2019 (aged 92)
- Height: 5 ft 7 in (1.70 m)
- Position: Left half

Youth career
- New Lambton
- Police Boys Club

Senior career*
Years	Team	Apps	(Gls)
- Adamstown
- Auburn
- Gladesville-Ryde

International career
1955	Australia	1	(0)
- * Club domestic league appearances and goals

Douglas James Wendt (January 1927 – 1 February 2019) was an Australian soccer player.

== Playing career ==
=== Club career ===
After playing as a junior for New Lambton and Police Boys' Club, he joined Adamstown where he made his debut in senior football. He later played for Auburn. In 1956 he transferred to Gladesville-Ryde.

=== International career ===
Wendt played several matches for Australia in B international matches, though in only one match considered to be a full international. His one full international match was a 6–0 loss to South Africa in Sydney.
