= Frank Melliar-Smith =

Australian soccer player

Frank Millier-Smith
Personal information
- Full name: Frank Millier-Smith
- Date of birth: 1889
- Place of birth: London, England
- Position: Outside left

Youth career
- Queens Park Rangers
- Dulwich Wood

Senior career*
Years	Team	Apps	(Gls)
1913–1916	Granville		
1917–1919	North Sydney		
1920–1924	Sydney		
1925–1930	Granville		
1931	Canterbury		

International career
1924	Australia	2	(0)
- * Club domestic league appearances and goals

Frank Millier-Smith was a former Australian professional soccer player who played as a forward and was an international player for the Australia national soccer team in 1924.

== International career ==
Millier-Smith began his international career in an outside left position with Australia in June 1924 on their historic tour against Canada, debuting in a 3–2 win over Canada He played his second and last match for Australia in a 1–0 win over Canada.

== Career statistics ==
=== International ===
National team	Year	Competitive		Friendly		Total	
National team	Year	Apps	Goals	Apps	Goals	Apps	Goals
Australia	1924	0	0	1	0	1	0
