= Bob Austin (soccer) =

Australian soccer player

Personal information
- Full name: Bob Austin
- Position: Goalkeeper

Senior career*
Years	Team	Apps	(Gls)
1914–1926	Weston		
1927	Cessnock		

International career
1923	Australia	1	(0)
- * Club domestic league appearances and goals

Bob Austin was a former Australian professional soccer player who last played as a goalkeeper for Cessnock and the Australia national soccer team.

== Club career ==
Austin began his senior career with Weston in 1914. He played in the 1917 finals series, where he was involved in a violent pitch invasion when playing against Weston Magpies. In September 1919, he played until the semi-final for Weston in the Gardiner Cup 1919. Until his end at Weston, he won two league Premierships, one league Championship and one cup win.

== International career ==
Gilmore began his international career with Australia in June 1923 on their second historic tour against New Zealand, debuting in a 2–3 loss to New Zealand scoring his first goal on debut.

== Career statistics ==
=== International ===
National team	Year	Competitive		Friendly		Total	
National team	Year	Apps	Goals	Apps	Goals	Apps	Goals
Australia	1923	0	0	1	0	1	0
