= George Blues =

Scottish footballer

Personal information
- Place of birth: Scotland
- Position: Winger

Youth career
- Dundee
- Bonnyvale Star

Senior career*
Years	Team	Apps	(Gls)
1960–1962	Falkirk	20	(2)
1962–1963	Berwick Rangers	25	(4)
1963–1964	Falkirk	2	(0)
1964–1965	Alloa Athletic	7	(0)
1965	Raith Rovers	2	(1)
- Johannesburg Wanderers
- Durban City
- APIA Leichhardt Tigers
Total		56	(7)

International career
1970	Australia	3	(1)
- * Club domestic league appearances and goals

George Blues is an Australian former international soccer player who played as a winger.

== Career ==
Born in Scotland, Blues began his career with Dundee. He played junior football with Bonnyvale Star, before playing in the Scottish Football League for Falkirk, Berwick Rangers, Alloa Athletic and Raith Rovers. After spells in South Africa with Johannesburg Wanderers and Durban City, Blues moved to Australia to play for APIA Leichhardt Tigers.

Blues made three official international appearances for Australia, and 16 in total including unofficial exhibition matches.
