= Les Suchanek =

Australian soccer player

Les Suchanek was an Australian soccer player.

== Career ==
Suchanek began playing in his native Hungary, emigrating to Australia in the early 1950s.

Suchanek played one match for Australia against New Zealand in Melbourne in 1954. The News and The Advertiser in Adelaide reported that he was the first New Australian to play for the national team.
