= Jimmy Love (Australian soccer) =

Australian soccer player

Personal information
- Place of birth: Scotland
- Position: Half-back

Senior career*
| Years | Team | Apps | (Gls) |
| ????–1921 | Queen's Park | | |
| 1921–???? | Thistle | | |

International career
| 1923 | Australia | 1 | (0) |
- * Club domestic league appearances and goals

James Love was an Australian soccer player who played as a half-back for Queen's Park, Thistle and the Australia national soccer team.

== Club career ==
After playing in Scotland, Love joined Brisbane team Queens Park before joining Thistle in 1921. He won the Premiership with Thistle in 1923.

== International career ==
Love played his one and only international match with Australia in June 1923 on their second tour against New Zealand, playing in a 2–1 win over New Zealand.

== Career statistics ==
=== International ===
| National team | Year | Competitive | | Friendly | | Total | |
| National team | Year | Apps | Goals | Apps | Goals | Apps | Goals |
|---|---|---|---|---|---|---|---|
| Australia | 1923 | 0 | 0 | 1 | 0 | 1 | 0 |
