= Johnny Peebles =

Australian soccer player, official, and administrator

John Muir Peebles (17 January 1889 – 11 November 1947) was an Australian soccer player, official, and administrator.

== Personal life ==
Peebles was born on 17 January 1889 in Glasgow, Scotland. He immigrated to Brisbane, Australia in 1913 with his two brothers (James and Joseph) and sister (Marion). He enlisted with his two brothers in the AIF in WW1 in 1916. He saw service on the Western Front. He returned to Australia in 1919. He died at the age of 58 in 1947.

== Club career ==
Peebles was a player for, and President of the Thistle Club (–1923). He also held other positions.

He later played for the Pineapple Rovers (captain) (1924–).

== Representative career ==
Peebles captained Brisbane in 1924.

He captained the Queensland team from 1919 to 1923.

== International career ==
Peebles played one match in 1923 for the Australia national soccer team against New Zealand in Sydney.

== Post player ==
Peebles was Manager of the Queensland team in 1925.

He was elected as a national selector in 1936.

At the time of his death, Peebles was president and chairman of the Queensland Soccer Football Association.

== Memoria ==
Peebles died in East Brisbane in November 1947 at the age of 58. In 1948, a trophy was established in memory of Peebles.
