= Danny Walsh (soccer) =

Australian soccer player (born 1944)

Personal information
- Date of birth: 21 May 1944 (age 82)
- Place of birth: Essex, England
- Position: Winger

Youth career
- Exeter City

Senior career*
Years	Team	Apps	(Gls)
1965–1967	Hakoah		

International career
1969	Australia	7	(0)
- * Club domestic league appearances and goals

Danny Walsh (born 21 May 1944) is a former soccer player who played as a winger for Hakoah. Born in England, he played for the Australia national team seven times.
