= Billy Rice =

Australian soccer player (1938–2008)

Personal information
- Date of birth: 12 September 1938
- Place of birth: Belfast, Northern Ireland
- Date of death: 26 June 2008 (aged 69)

Youth career
- Distillery

Senior career*
Years	Team	Apps	(Gls)
- JUST

International career^{‡}
1965–1969	Australia	5	(0)
- * Club domestic league appearances and goals as of 10 May 2009 ‡ National team caps and goals as of 10 May 2009

Billy Rice (12 September 1938 in Belfast, Northern Ireland – 26 June 2008) was a football player who played for Australia in their 1966 FIFA World Cup qualification campaign.
