= Alwyn Warren (soccer) =

Australian soccer player (1931–2004)

Personal information
- Full name: Alwyn Isaac Warren
- Date of birth: 1 November 1931
- Date of death: March 2004 (aged 72)

Senior career*
Years	Team	Apps	(Gls)
1957	Blackstone Rovers		

International career
- Australia
- * Club domestic league appearances and goals

Alwyn Isaac Warren (1 November 1931 – March 2004) was an Australian soccer player. Warren represented Australia at the 1956 Summer Olympics. Warren was a life member of the Ipswich Knights Soccer Club.
