= Jack Edwards (soccer) =

Australian soccer player

Toddy Edwards
Personal information
- Full name: Jack Toddy Edwards
- Position: Forward

Senior career*
Years	Team	Apps	(Gls)
- Blackstone
- Bush Rats
- Bundamba

International career
1924	Australia	1	(0)
- * Club domestic league appearances and goals

Toddy Edwards was an Australian former professional soccer player who played as a forward for Blackstone and the Australia national soccer team.

== International career ==
Edwards played his first and only international match for Australia on 7 June 1924 against Canada in a very controversial selection. Some of Edwards' teammates had refused to play after his only game for Australia when Bill Mitchell was initially going to be selected to play instead of Edwards.

== Referee career ==
After his end in his club career, Edwards became a referee. He first controlled the 1936 Tristram Shield Final between Milton and Booval Stars at Lang Park. He was also selected as the referee for his first international match as referee with teams Australia and India in August 1938.

== Career statistics ==
=== International ===
National team	Year	Competitive		Friendly		Total	
National team	Year	Apps	Goals	Apps	Goals	Apps	Goals
Australia	1924	0	0	1	0	1	0
