= Gilbert Storey =

Australian soccer player

Personal information
- Full name: Gilbert Storey
- Date of birth: 22 July 1899
- Place of birth: Balmain, Australia
- Date of death: 15 March 1987 (aged 87)
- Position: Centre-half

Senior career*
Years	Team	Apps	(Gls)
1921–1927	Balmain Gladstone		

International career
1923–1924	Australia	5	(0)
- * Club domestic league appearances and goals

Gilbert Storey (1899–1987) was an Australian professional soccer player who played as a half-back for Balmain Gladstone and the Australia national soccer team.

== International career ==
Storey began his international career with Australia in June 1923 on their second historic tour against New Zealand, debuting in a 1–4 loss to New Zealand. He was selected in the 1924 tour against Canada where he was sent off in a 4–1 win over Canada with no replacements allowed. Storey had also been injured in Australia's fifth test match against Canada on 12 July in a 1–4 loss, without him being able to play in Australia's final test.

== Career statistics ==
=== International ===
National team	Year	Competitive		Friendly		Total	
National team	Year	Apps	Goals	Apps	Goals	Apps	Goals
Australia	1923	0	0	1	0	1	0
Australia	1924	0	0	4	0	4	0
Career total		0	0	5	0	5	0
