= Dick van Alphen =

Australian soccer player

Personal information
- Date of birth: 18 September 1938
- Place of birth: Netherlands
- Date of death: 21 May 2009 (aged 70)
- Place of death: Hervey Bay, Australia

Youth career
- De Volewijckers

Senior career*
Years	Team	Apps	(Gls)
1956–1960	De Volewijckers	99	(9)
1961–1965	Ringwood Wilhelmina		
1966–1969	Melbourne Hakoah		
1974	Caulfield City		

International career
1967–1968	Australia	9	(0)
- * Club domestic league appearances and goals as of 13 May 2009

Dick van Alphen (18 September 1938 – 21 May 2009) was an Australian soccer player.

== Club career ==
Van Alphen played for the Amsterdam team De Volewijckers in his native Holland before he emigrated to Australia in 1960. He played for Ringwood Wilhelmina, Melbourne Hakoah and Caulfield City.

== International career ==
Van Alphen made his debut for Australia against New Zealand in 1967 and earned a total of 9 caps for the Socceroos.
