= Eric Nunn =

Australian soccer player

Personal information
- Full name: Eric Ronald Nunn
- Place of birth: Dinmore, Ipswich, Queensland
- Position: Half-back

Senior career*
Years	Team	Apps	(Gls)
1920–1930	Dinmore Bush Rats		
1930–?	Booval Stars		

International career
1924	Australia	1	(0)
- * Club domestic league appearances and goals

Eric Nunn was an Australian professional soccer player who played as a half-back and was an international player for the Australia national soccer team.

== Club career ==
Nunn played with the Dinmore Bush Rats throughout the 1920s. He won the 1928 Tristram Shield against Thistle where Dinmore Bush Rats won 2–1 in the Final. He joined Booval Stars in 1930, where he gave up playing soccer in 1932 until he returned two years later with Booval Stars.

== International career ==
Nunn played his first and only international match for Australia against Canada where Australia won 3–2 on 7 June 1924.

Nunn is designated Socceroo cap number 31.

== Career statistics ==
=== International ===
National team	Year	Competitive		Friendly		Total	
National team	Year	Apps	Goals	Apps	Goals	Apps	Goals
Australia	1924	0	0	1	0	1	0
