= Pete Stone =

Australian soccer player

Personal information
- Full name: Peter Stone
- Position: Midfielder

Senior career*
Years	Team	Apps	(Gls)
- Bankstown

International career^{‡}
1956	Australia	1	(0)
- * Club domestic league appearances and goals as of 11 May 2009 ‡ National team caps and goals as of 11 May 2009

Peter Stone is an Australian former football (soccer) player. Stone was a member of the Australian team at the 1956 Summer Olympics.
