= George Bristow (soccer) =

Australian soccer player

Personal information
- Place of birth: Melbourne, Australia
- Position: Half-back

Senior career*
Years	Team	Apps	(Gls)
192?–1927	Northumberland & Durham United		
1927–?	South Melbourne United		
- Melbourne Thistle

International career
1924	Australia	1	(0)
- * Club domestic league appearances and goals

George Bristow was an Australian soccer player who played as midfielder for Melbourne clubs and the Australia national team. His senior career varied between three clubs based in Melbourne; Northumberland & Durham United, South Melbourne United and Melbourne Thistle. He won the 1921 Dockerty Cup with Northumberland & Durham United.

== International career ==
Bristow played once for Australia; that match being a 4–1 loss against Canada on 12 July 1924.

== Career statistics ==
=== International ===
Team	Year	Competitive		Friendly		Total	
Team	Year	Apps	Goals	Apps	Goals	Apps	Goals
Australia	1924	0	0	1	0	1	0
