= Angus Gibb =

Australian soccer player

Personal information
- Full name: Angus Billy Gibb
- Place of birth: Fort Worth, United States
- Positions: Left half; right half

Senior career*
Years	Team	Apps	(Gls)
1924–1929	Pineapple Rovers		
1930	Bulimba		
1931–1941	Latrobe		

International career
1933	Australia	1	(0)
- * Club domestic league appearances and goals

Angus Gibb was a former Australian professional soccer player who played as a half-back in left and right positions for Australian clubs and the Australia national soccer team. Gibb is known as an unknown player for being mistaken by Alex Gibb by Football Federation Australia. He received cap no. 51A on revising Australia's official caps list.

== Early life ==
Gibb was born in Fort Worth, Texas, United States. He moved to Brisbane and started playing at East Brisbane State School.

== International career ==
Gibb played for the Australia national soccer team in a left-half position, and was capped only once on 5 June 1933 against New Zealand.

== Career statistics ==
=== International ===
National team	Year	Competitive		Friendly		Total	
National team	Year	Apps	Goals	Apps	Goals	Apps	Goals
Australia	1933	0	0	1	0	1	0
