= Harry Spurway =

Australian footballer

Personal information
- Full name: Harry Spurway
- Place of birth: Sydney, Australia
- Position: Left-half

Senior career*
| Years | Team | Apps | (Gls) |
| 1920–1925 | Granville | | |
| 1925–1928 | Gladesville | | |

International career
| 1924 | Australia | 4 | (0) |
- * Club domestic league appearances and goals

Harry Spurway was an Australian professional soccer player who played as a half-back. He played for NSW clubs Granville and Gladesville and the Australia national team.

== Club career ==
=== 1920–1925: Granville ===
Spurway announced his retirement from first-class soccer and leave Granville on 31 March 1925.

=== 1925–1928: Gladesville ===
Ten days later after his first class retirement, it was announced in the Arrow newspapers on 10 April 1925 that Spurway joined the Gladesville club. He retired from soccer on 27 April 1928, finishing his career at Gladesville.

== International career ==
Spurway began his international career with Australia in a 1–0 loss to Canada on 14 June 1924. He appeared three more times with his fourth and final cap coming in a 1–0 win over Canada on 26 July 1924.

== Career statistics ==
=== International ===
| National team | Year | Competitive | | Friendly | | Total | |
| National team | Year | Apps | Goals | Apps | Goals | Apps | Goals |
|---|---|---|---|---|---|---|---|
| Australia | 1924 | 0 | 0 | 4 | 0 | 4 | 0 |

== Honours ==
Granville

- Sydney Metropolitan First Division: 1923, 1924

Gladesvile

- Sydney Metropolitan First Division: 1927
