= Andy Henderson (soccer) =

Australian soccer player and coach

Andy Henderson, Sr
Personal information
- Full name: Andy Henderson
- Position: Midfielder

Senior career*
Years	Team	Apps	(Gls)
- Granville

International career
1924	Australia	2	(0)
- * Club domestic league appearances and goals

Andy Henderson, Sr was an Australian soccer player and coach who played as a midfielder.

Born in Scotland, he came to Australia at 23 where he said he learnt his soccer.

Henderson played two matches for the Australian national football team in 1924.

Henderson was the father of national team player Bill Henderson. They became the first father–son combination for Australia.
