= Jim Robison (soccer) =

Australian soccer player

Personal information
- Full name: Jim Robison
- Place of birth: Northumberland, England
- Position: Goalkeeper

Senior career*
Years	Team	Apps	(Gls)
1914–1926	N and D		

International career
1924	Australia	1	(0)
- * Club domestic league appearances and goals

Jim Robison was an English-born Australian professional soccer player who played as a goalkeeper. He was also an international player for the Australia national soccer team.

Robison was capped once with Australia in 1924 against Canada.

== International career ==
Robison played his first and only international match for Australia on 14 June 1924 in a 0–1 loss to Canada.

== Career statistics ==
=== International ===
National team	Year	Competitive		Friendly		Total	
National team	Year	Apps	Goals	Apps	Goals	Apps	Goals
Australia	1924	0	0	1	0	1	0
