= Judy Masters =

Australia international soccer player (1892–1955)

Personal information
- Full name: James William Masters
- Date of birth: 21 May 1892
- Place of birth: Balgownie, New South Wales, Australia
- Date of death: 2 December 1955 (aged 63)
- Place of death: Balgownie, New South Wales, Australia
- Position: Centre forward

Youth career
- 1901-1904: Balgownie Rangers

Senior career*
Years	Team	Apps	(Gls)
1904–1911	Balgownie Rangers		
1912–1913	Newtown		
1914–1915	Granville		
1919-1929	Balgownie Rangers		

International career
1923–1924	Australia	6	(5)
Military career
Allegiance	Australia
Branch	Australian Army
Service years	1915–1919
Rank	Sergeant
Unit	19th Battalion
Conflicts	World War I; Gallipoli; Western Front
- * Club domestic league appearances and goals

James William "Judy" Masters (21 May 1892 – 2 December 1955) was a soccer player who captained the Australia national team in five matches in 1923 and 1924. He was recognised as one of Australia's best players of his time. In over 400 club and representative games he was never cautioned.

== Biography ==
Masters was born in 1892 to Alexander George Masters and Frances Eliza Masters, née Campbell and was one of thirteen children. His father had been a miner born in Nova Scotia and his mother was from Sydney.

Masters first captained the Balgownie Public School team at the age of 12.

== Club career ==
He then joined Balgownie Rangers Soccer Club (the oldest surviving football club in Australia) in 1904, gaining selection for the senior side at the age of 15 in 1907 after being coached by Tom Thompson, and played alongside Dave Ward and Frank Smith.

Masters went on to captain Balgownie Rangers, South Coast FC, and received representative honours with New South Wales (who he first played for in 1908 when 16, at inside-right), then Granville and Newton after enlisting at the Liverpool barracks before departing for service at Gallipoli and in France. He led an AIF team which was formed in France after the Armistice in 1918.

When he returned to Australia, Masters rejoined Balgownie in their undefeated 1921 championship side.

== International career ==
Masters appeared 22 times for Australia including six full international matches. He was captain of Australia five times in full internationals.

His first match for the national side came in 1924 in a B international against a Chinese Universities team on 8 August, when he scored four times. He was captain of Australia in: five games against the Chinese Universities team in 1923, all five tests against Canada in 1924, and three games against FC Bohemians Praha of Czechoslovakia in 1927.

== Outside football ==
While playing Masters worked as a miner at the Corrimal coal mine.

After retiring, he became an executive officer for the South Coast Soccer Association.

For over a decade Masters was master of the Balgownie Citizens' Band.

== Military service ==
Masters served in the Australian Imperial Force between 1915 until the end of World War I. He was in the front line at Gallipoli and later at the Western Front. In 1916, at Pozières on the Western Front, Masters was injured in the shoulder.

== Career statistics ==
=== International ===
National team	Year	Competitive		Friendly		Total	
National team	Year	Apps	Goals	Apps	Goals	Apps	Goals
Australia	1923	0	0	1	0	1	0
Australia	1924	0	0	5	5	5	5
Career total		0	0	6	5	6	5

Scores and results list Australia's goal tally first, score column indicates score after each Australia goal.

List of international goals scored by Judy Masters
No.	Date	Venue	Opponent	Score	Result	Competition	Ref.
1	7 June 1924	Brisbane Cricket Ground, Brisbane, Australia	Canada	2–1	3–2	Friendly	
2	7 June 1924	Brisbane Cricket Ground, Brisbane, Australia	Canada	3–1	3–2	Friendly	
3	23 June 1924	Royal Agricultural Showground, Sydney, Australia	Canada	–	4–1	Friendly	
4	23 June 1924	Royal Agricultural Showground, Sydney, Australia	Canada	–	4–1	Friendly	
5	26 July 1924	Royal Agricultural Showground, Sydney, Australia	Canada	1–0	1–0	Friendly	
