= Tommy Oliver (soccer) =

Australian soccer player

Personal information
- Place of birth: England
- Positions: Left-back; right-back

Senior career*
Years	Team	Apps	(Gls)
1920–1928	Weston		

International career
1924	Australia	4	(0)
- * Club domestic league appearances and goals

Tommy Oliver was a former Australian professional soccer player who played as a defender for NSW club Weston and the Australia national soccer team.

== Early life ==
Tommy Oliver moved to Newcastle, New South Wales around the time of World War I.

== International career ==
Oliver began his undefeated international career with Australia playing in left-back position against Canada in a 3–2 win on 7 June 1924. He played his next match against Canada in a right-back position in a 4–1 win. He made two further appearances against Canada in a 0–0 draw and a 1–0 win.

== Career statistics ==
=== International ===
National team	Year	Competitive		Friendly		Total	
National team	Year	Apps	Goals	Apps	Goals	Apps	Goals
Australia	1924	0	0	4	0	4	0
Career total		0	0	4	0	4	0
