= William Faulkner (soccer) =

Australian soccer player

Personal information
- Full name: William Faulkner
- Place of birth: Glossop, England
- Position: Full back

Senior career*
Years	Team	Apps	(Gls)
- Corinthians
- Cadbury-Fry-Pascall
- Hobart Athletic
- Sturt
- West Adelaide

International career
1924	Australia	1	(0)
- * Club domestic league appearances and goals

William Faulkner was an English-born Australian professional soccer player who played as a full-back. He was also an international player for the Australia national soccer team.

== International career ==
Faulker played his first and only international match for Australia on 14 June 1924 in a 0–1 loss to Canada.

== Career statistics ==
=== International ===
National team	Year	Competitive		Friendly		Total	
National team	Year	Apps	Goals	Apps	Goals	Apps	Goals
Australia	1924	0	0	1	0	1	0
