= William Maunder =

Australian soccer player (1902–1964)

Personal information
- Date of birth: 30 November 1902
- Place of birth: Newcastle, Australia
- Date of death: 25 June 1964 (aged 61)
- Place of death: Newcastle, Australia
- Position: Forward

Senior career*
Years	Team	Apps	(Gls)
1920–1925	West Wallsend		
- New Lambton

International career
1922–1924	Australia	9	(6)
- * Club domestic league appearances and goals

William "Podge" Maunder (30 November 1902 – 25 June 1964) was an Australian soccer player. Maunder is recognised as the player who scored Australia's first international goal.

== Early life ==
Maunder was born in Newcastle in 1902. His father, known as "Doey" Maunder was a prominent local soccer player. William Maunder's brother, Henry also took up the game and William and Henry appeared in an international match together against Canada in 1924.

== Club career ==
In his club career, Maunder scored more than 500 goals in Northern NSW competition and was offered a professional contract by Scottish club St Mirren F.C.

== International career ==
Maunder made his international debut for Australia on 17 June 1922 in Australia's first recognised international match, scoring on 45 minutes. Maunder played nine matches for Australia between 1922 and 1930, scoring six goals and captaining for one match on 28 June 1924 against Canada.

== Career statistics ==
=== International ===
Appearances and goals by national team, year and competition
Team	Year	Competitive		Friendly		Total	
Team	Year	Apps	Goals	Apps	Goals	Apps	Goals
Australia	1922	0	0	3	1	3	1
Australia	1923	0	0	3	2	3	2
Australia	1924	0	0	3	3	3	3
Career total		0	0	9	6	9	6

Scores and results list Australia's goal tally first, score column indicates score after each Australia goal.

List of international goals scored by William Maunder
No.	Date	Venue	Opponent	Score	Result	Competition	Ref.
1	17 June 1922	Carisbrook Park, Dunedin, New Zealand	New Zealand	1–1	1–3	Friendly	
2	9 June 1923	Brisbane Cricket Ground, Brisbane, Australia	New Zealand	2–1	2–1	Friendly	
3	30 June 1923	Newcastle Showground, Newcastle, Australia	New Zealand	1–0	1–4	Friendly	
4	23 June 1924	Royal Agricultural Showground, Sydney, Australia	Canada	–	4–1	Friendly	
5	23 June 1924	Royal Agricultural Showground, Sydney, Australia	Canada	4–1	4–1	Friendly	
6	12 July 1924	Jubilee Oval, Adelaide, Australia	Canada	1–4	1–4	Friendly	
