= Australia men's national soccer team results (unofficial matches) =

This is a list of the Australia national soccer team's results from 1922 to the present day that, for various reasons, are not accorded the status of official International A Matches.

== 1920s ==
=== 1922 ===
27 May	Wanganui (New Zealand)	1–3	Australia	Wanganui, New Zealand
	Cooper (?)	Report	J. Cumberford (?); unknown 83'; Bratten (?)	Stadium: Cooks Gardens; Attendance: 2,000; Referee: J Leddy (New Zealand)

31 May	Nelson (New Zealand)	2–8	Australia	Nelson, New Zealand
	Wheeler (?); unknown (?)	Report	Brown (?); unknown (?); unknown (?); Ward (?); J. Cumberford (?); Doyle (?)	Attendance: 2,000

3 June	Wellington (New Zealand)	3–0	Australia	Wellington, New Zealand
	Campbell (?); Thomas (?); Gilbertson (?)	Report		Stadium: Basin Reserve; Attendance: 4,000; Referee: W Bryce (New Zealand)

7 June	Westland (New Zealand)	1–2	Australia	Greymouth, New Zealand
	Grey 15'	Report	Brown (?); unknown (?)	Stadium: Victoria Park; Attendance: 1,489; Referee: M Thornley (New Zealand)

10 June	South Island (New Zealand)	1–4	Australia	Christchurch, New Zealand
	Race (?)	Report	Maunder (?); Bratten (?); Dane (?)	Stadium: Lancaster Park; Attendance: 4,000; Referee: George Black (New Zealand)

14 June	Otago (New Zealand)	1–2	Australia	Dunedin, New Zealand
	Robinson (?)	Report	Fisher (?); Dane (?)	Stadium: Carisbrook; Attendance: 3,000; Referee: W Smith (New Zealand)

21 June	Canterbury (New Zealand)	3–1	Australia	Ashburton, New Zealand
	Mizen 3' (?); Norman (?)	Report	Maunder (?)	Referee: E Davey (New Zealand)

28 June	Taranaki (New Zealand)	1–6	Australia	New Plymouth, New Zealand
	Freakley (?)	Report	J. Cumberford (?); Brown (?); Dane (?)	Stadium: Pukekura Park

1 July	Auckland (New Zealand)	1–4	Australia	Auckland, New Zealand
	Knott (?)	Report	Brown (?); Maunder (?)	Stadium: Auckland Domain; Attendance: 3,000; Referee: A Bowie (New Zealand)

5 July	South Auckland (New Zealand)	1–2	Australia	Hamilton, New Zealand
	Barnett (?)	Report	Brown (?)	Stadium: Seddon Park; Referee: J Ball (New Zealand)

5 July	Manawatu (New Zealand)	0–5	Australia	Palmerston North, New Zealand
		Report	Maunder (?); Ward (?); Dane 89'	Stadium: Palmerston North Showgrounds

5 July	Australia	1–1	New South Wales	Sydney, Australia
	Ward (?)	Report	Lennard (?)	Stadium: Wentworth Park; Referee: A Peaty (Australia)

=== 1923 ===
8 August	Australia	5–1	China	Sydney, Australia
	Masters (?); Henderson (?)	Report	Chan Kwong In (?)	Stadium: Sydney Showground Stadium; Attendance: 20,000; Referee: E Lukeman (Australia)

25 August	Australia	4–3	China	Newcastle, Australia
	Lennard (?); Hancock (?); Masters (?)	Report	Wong Pak Cheung (?); Li Wai Tong (?)	Stadium: Newcastle Showgrounds; Attendance: 16,000; Referee: W Scott (Australia)

15 September	Australia	5–0	China	Brisbane, Australia
	Masters (?); Gilmour (?); Robertson (?)	Report		Attendance: 8,000; Referee: C Lyst (Australia)

22 September	Australia	1–3	China	Sydney, Australia
	Hancock (?)	Report	Chang Hsi En 15'; Li Wai Tong (?)	Stadium: Sydney Showground Stadium; Attendance: 5,000; Referee: J Lester (Australia)

29 September	Australia	2–0	China	Melbourne, Australia
	Orr (?); Lennard (?)	Report

5 October	Australia	2–2	China	Adelaide, Australia
	Phillips (?)	Report	Li Wai Tong (?); Chang Hsi En (?)	Stadium: Jubilee Oval; Attendance: 9,000; Referee: W Ashworth (Australia)

=== 1924 ===
5 July	Australia	0–3	Canada	Melbourne, Australia
		Report	Ford (?); Wilson 44'; Stobbart (?)	Stadium: Melbourne Cricket Ground; Attendance: 5,000; Referee: G Clarke (Australia)

=== 1925 ===
16 May	Australia	1–4	(England) English FA	Adelaide, Australia
		Report

23 May	Australia	0–5	(England) English FA	Melbourne, Australia
		Report

27 June	Australia	1–5	(England) English FA	Brisbane, Australia
	Lennard 50'	Report	Batten (?); Simms (?)	Stadium: Brisbane Exhibition Ground; Attendance: 30,000

4 July	Australia	1–2	(England) English FA	Sydney, Australia
		Report		Referee: W Wright (Australia)

11 July	Australia	2–8	(England) English FA	Maitland, Australia
	Lennard (?); Thompson (?)	Report	Batten 2' (?); Simms (?); Hannaford (?)	Attendance: 10,000; Referee: J Sanderson (Australia)

18 July	Australia	0–5	(England) English FA	Sydney, Australia
		Report		Stadium: Royal Agricultural Showground; Referee: W Wright (Australia)

25 July	Australia	0–2	(England) English FA	Melbourne, Australia
		Report	Charlton 25'; Batten (?)	Stadium: Fitzroy Ground

=== 1927 ===
14 May	Australia	1–2	(First Czechoslovak Republic) Bohemians AFK Vršovice	Adelaide, Australia
	P. Robertson (?)	Report	Knížek (?); Hoffmann (?)	Stadium: Jubilee Oval; Referee: W. Ashworth (Australia)

21 May	Australia	1–4	(First Czechoslovak Republic) Bohemians AFK Vršovice	Melbourne, Australia
	Orr (?)	Report	Hoffmann (?); Knížek (?)	Stadium: Melbourne Cricket Ground

6 June	Australia	4–6	(First Czechoslovak Republic) Bohemians AFK Vršovice	Sydney, Australia
	Bourke (?); Cameron (?); Veigel (?); Masters (?)	Report	Knížek (?); Havlín (?); Špic (?)	Stadium: Royal Agricultural Showground; Attendance: 25,000; Referee: A. W. Bates (Australia)

18 June	Australia	5–5	(First Czechoslovak Republic) Bohemians AFK Vršovice	Brisbane, Australia
	Cameron 10' (?); B. Robertson (?); Kyle 87'	Report	Eisner (?), 42'; Knížek (?); Hybš (?)	Stadium: Brisbane Exhibition Ground; Attendance: 14,000; Referee: C. Lyst (Australia)

18 June	Australia	0–3	China	Adelaide, Australia
		Report

25 June	Australia	4–4	(First Czechoslovak Republic) Bohemians AFK Vršovice	Sydney, Australia
	Clark (?); Hoffmann (?); B. Robertson (?); Cameron (?)	Report	Knížek (?); Hodge (?); Mašat (?)	Stadium: Royal Agricultural Showground; Attendance: 6,000; Referee: A. W. Bates (Australia)

2 July	Australia	6–2	China	Melbourne, Australia
		Report

9 July	Australia	6–1	China	Sydney, Australia
	Masters (?); Park (?); Thompson (?); Cameron (?); H. Robertson (?)	Report	Chou (?)	Attendance: 8,000; Referee: W. Wright (Australia)

16 July	Australia	7–4	China	Brisbane, Australia
		Report

23 July	Australia	1–1	China	Newcastle, Australia
	O'Brien (?)	Report	W.T. Lee (?)

=== 1928 ===
17 June	Australia	1–2	New South Wales	Newcastle, Australia
		Report		Stadium: Hobart Park

2 July	Makassar Football Association XI (Dutch East Indies)	1–2	Australia	Makassar, Dutch East Indies
		Report

7 July	Houdt Braef Stant (Dutch East Indies)	3–3 (a.e.t.)	Australia	Soerabaja, Dutch East Indies
	G. de Raadt (?); ? (?); Knufman (?)	Report	Thompson (?)	Referee: Gobus (Dutch East Indies)

8 July	Soerabaja Football Association XI (Dutch East Indies)	1–3	Australia	Soerabaja, Dutch East Indies
	Sadjimin (?)	Report	Coates (?); Thompson (?); Cameron (?)	Referee: Walsarie Wolff (Dutch East Indies)

11 July	Excelsior (Dutch East Indies)	1–4	Australia	Soerabaja, Dutch East Indies
	Cuno (?)	Report	Thompson (?); Coates (?); H. Robertson (?); Johnstone (?)	Referee: van der Kasteele (Dutch East Indies)

14 July	Go Ahead (Dutch East Indies)	3–5	Australia	Semarang, Dutch East Indies
	Bloem (?); Jorissen (?); Willé (?)	Report	? (?); ? (?); Johnstone (?); ? (?); ? (?)	Referee: Hartog (Dutch East Indies)

15 July	Semarang Football Association XI (Dutch East Indies)	0–3	Australia	Semarang, Dutch East Indies
		Report	? (?); Cameron (?); O'Connor (?)	Referee: Van Hulsteyn (Dutch East Indies)

18 July	Chinese Java XI (Dutch East Indies)	1–6	Australia	Semarang, Dutch East Indies
	? (?)	Report	H. Robertson (?), 8'; Johnstone (?); Coates (?); Grieves (?)	Referee: Hartog (Dutch East Indies)

21 July	Bandoeng Football Association XI (Dutch East Indies)	3–4	Australia	Bandoeng, Dutch East Indies
	Bochem (?); Lippelt (?)	Report	Thompson (?); H. Robertson (?)	Referee: De Wilde (Dutch East Indies)

22 July	Uitspanning na Inspanning (Dutch East Indies)	0–2	Australia	Bandoeng, Dutch East Indies
		Report	Thompson (?); Johnstone (?)	Referee: De Wilde (Dutch East Indies)

28 July	Chinese Football Association and Malaya Football Association XI (Singapore)	4–2	Australia	Anson, Singapore
	Dol Fatah (?); Nor (?); Yong Liang (?)	Report	Thompson (?)	Stadium: Anson Road Stadium; Attendance: ~7,000; Referee: Tibbenham (Singapore)

29 July	Malaya Football Association XI (Singapore)	0–1	Australia	Anson, Singapore
		Report	Thompson (?)	Stadium: Anson Road Stadium; Referee: F. M. Still (Singapore)

1 August	European XI (Singapore)	0–6	Australia	Anson, Singapore
		Report	Thompson (?); Cameron (?); H. Johnson (?); Deacon (?)	Stadium: Anson Road Stadium; Referee: Bennett (Singapore)

2 August	2nd Battalion Duke of Wellington's Regiment (Singapore)	2–2	Australia	Anson, Singapore
	Sansom (?); Hall (?)	Report	Thompson (?)	Stadium: Anson Road Stadium; Referee: Tan Lee Wan (Singapore)

7 August	Bandoeng Football Association XI (Dutch East Indies)	1–3	Australia	Bandoeng, Dutch East Indies
	Giesel (?)	Report	Cameron 7'; H. Robertson 9', 45'	Referee: Villevoye (Dutch East Indies)

8 August	Cheribon Football Association XI (Dutch East Indies)	0–4	Australia	Cheribon, Dutch East Indies
		Report

11 August	M.O.T. (Dutch East Indies)	2–2	Australia	Semarang, Dutch East Indies
		Report		Referee: Bousché (Dutch East Indies)

12 August	Semarang Football Association XI (Dutch East Indies)	1–4	Australia	Semarang, Dutch East Indies
	Bloem (?)	Report		Referee: Metz (Dutch East Indies)

15 August	Houdt Braef Stant (Dutch East Indies)	0–0	Australia	Soerabaja, Dutch East Indies
		Report		Referee: Weggeman (Dutch East Indies)

18 August	Excelsior (Dutch East Indies)	1–3	Australia	Soerabaja, Dutch East Indies
	Tremio (?)	Report	Cameron (?); Coates (?)	Referee: Cortenbach (Dutch East Indies)

19 August	Dutch East Indies	2–1	Australia	Soerabaja, Dutch East Indies
	Rehatta 30', 95'	Report	Cameron (?)	Referee: van der Kasteele (Dutch East Indies)

22 August	Soerabaja Football Association XI (Dutch East Indies)	1–5	Australia	Soerabaja, Dutch East Indies
	Sadjimin (?)	Report	Deacon (?); Cameron (?)	Referee: van der Kasteele (Dutch East Indies)

23 August	Tot Heil Onzer Ribbenkast (Dutch East Indies)	0–3	Australia	Soerabaja, Dutch East Indies
		Report	Cook (?); Thompson (?)	Referee: Helmig (Dutch East Indies)

25 August	Makassar Football Association XI (Dutch East Indies)	0–4	Australia	Makassar, Dutch East Indies
		Report

== 1930s ==
=== 1931 ===
29 August	Celebes XI (Dutch East Indies)	0–2	Australia	Makassar, Dutch East Indies
		Report	Lewis (?)

3 September	Houdt Braef Stant (Dutch East Indies)	2–1	Australia	Soerabaja, Dutch East Indies
	Uktolseja (?)	Report	Johnstone (?)	Stadium: T.H.O.R. Field; Referee: Hearts (Dutch East Indies)

5 September	Tiong Hoa (Dutch East Indies)	0–4	Australia	Soerabaja, Dutch East Indies
		Report	Johnstone 27'; Lewis (?); McIver (?); Russell (?)	Referee: Gobus (Dutch East Indies)

6 September	Singapore Combined Services	2–4	Australia	Soerabaja, Dutch East Indies
	Raybould (?); Woodward (?)	Report	Clark 20' (?); Donaldson (?); Lewis (?)	Referee: Foltynski (Dutch East Indies)

10 September	Hercules (Dutch East Indies)	3–0	Australia	Batavia, Dutch East Indies
	Soemo 6' (?)	Report		Stadium: Deca Park; Referee: Sommer (Dutch East Indies)

12 September	Unity Makes Strength (Dutch East Indies)	1–3	Australia	Batavia, Dutch East Indies
	Cheng Kee (?)	Report	Russell (?); Muir (?)	Referee: H. Prins (Dutch East Indies)

13 September	Batavia Football Association XI (Dutch East Indies)	1–2	Australia	Batavia, Dutch East Indies
	Soemo 23'	Report	Clark 17'; Meeng 23' (o.g.)	Referee: M. Prins (Dutch East Indies)

16 September	Sport Vereeniging Binnenlandsch Bestuur (Dutch East Indies)	0–4	Australia	Batavia, Dutch East Indies
		Report	J. Martin (?); Muir (?); Weir (?)	Stadium: Hercules Field; Referee: Hagenaar (Dutch East Indies)

17 September	Bandoeng Football Association XI (Dutch East Indies)	3–1	Australia	Bandoeng, Dutch East Indies
	Prins (?); Goyers (?); Laktoero (?)	Report	De Wolff (?)	Referee: De Wilde (Dutch East Indies)

19 September	Soerabaja Football Association XI (Dutch East Indies)	1–1	Australia	Soerabaja, Dutch East Indies
	Bakhuys (?)	Report	Lewis 20'	Referee: Gobus (Dutch East Indies)

20 September	Tiong Hoa (China)	1–8	Australia	Soerabaja, Dutch East Indies
	King Han (?)	Report	Lewis (?); James (?); Roe (?); Clark (?); ? (?)	Referee: Harten (Dutch East Indies)

21 September	Tot Heil Onzer Ribbenkast (Dutch East Indies)	2–6	Australia	Soerabaja, Dutch East Indies
	Bakhuys (?); Feuerberg (?)	Report	Muir (?); James (?); Lewis (?)	Referee: Fruneaux (Dutch East Indies)

24 September	Makassar Football Association XI (Dutch East Indies)	0–1	Australia	Makassar, Dutch East Indies
		Report

=== 1933 ===
10 June	Australia	2–2	New Zealand	Newcastle, Australia
	Quill 20', 65'	Report	Kershaw 12', 81'	Stadium: Hobart Park; Attendance: 1,500; Referee: H. Richardson (Australia)

3 August	Australia	4–3	Sydney Metro	Sydney, Australia
	Cameron (?); Smith (?); Crowhurst (?)	Report	Everndon (?)	Stadium: Ibrox Park; Referee: D. Quinn (Australia)

13 August	New Caledonia B	1–8	Australia	Nouméa, New Caledonia
	Lacabanne (?)	Report	Smith 20'; Cameron 40'; ? (?); ? (?); ? (?); ? (?); ? (?); ? (?)	Stadium: Vélodrome du Receiving; Referee: G. Pons (New Caledonia)

15 August	New Caledonia	1–2	Australia	Nouméa, New Caledonia
	A. Canel 62'	Report	Gorring 29'; Murray 81'	Stadium: Vélodrome du Receiving; Attendance: 3,800; Referee: Parazols (New Caledonia)

20 August	New Caledonia	2–4	Australia	Nouméa, New Caledonia
	J. Paneonin 30'; A. Canel (?)	Report	Gorring (?); ? (?); ? (?); ? (?)	Stadium: Vélodrome du Receiving; Attendance: 3,500

27 August	New Caledonia	3–7	Australia	Nouméa, New Caledonia
	Beyney (?); C. Canel (?)	Report	Smith (?); Gorring (?); Crowhurst (?)	Stadium: Vélodrome du Receiving

3 September	Impassible (New Caledonia)	1–6	Australia	Nouméa, New Caledonia
	Payan (?)	Report	Smith 2', 41', 57', 77'; Cameron 72'; Crowhurst (?)	Stadium: Vélodrome du Receiving; Referee: Charbonnel (New Caledonia)

9 September	New Caledonia	0–5	Australia	Nouméa, New Caledonia
		Report	Smith (?); Cameron (?)	Stadium: Vélodrome du Receiving; Attendance: 1,000; Referee: Parazols (New Caledonia)

=== 1935 ===
24 June	Australia	4–3	(Australia) The Rest	Brisbane, Australia
	Smith (?); Gorring (?); A. Campbell (?)	Report	Workman (?)	Stadium: Lang Park

=== 1936 ===
2 May	New South Wales	10–2	Australia	Sydney, Australia
	Evernden (?); Hughes (?); Smith (?); Crowhurst (?); Osborne (?)	Report	Combe (?); Nelson (?)	Stadium: Arlington Recreation Ground; Attendance: 3,400; Referee: A. Willetts (Australia)

4 May	The Rest (Australia)	2–5	Australia	Newcastle, Australia
	Cameron (?)	Report	Harris (?); Combe (?); Hughes (?); Forrest (?); White (?)	Stadium: Hobart Park; Referee: Wal Tromans (Australia)

13 June	Sydney Metro	6–4	Australia	Sydney, Australia
	Davidson (?); Crowhurst (?); Morton (?); Quill (?); Hughes (?)	Report	Cameron (?); Price (?); Donaldson (?); Smith (?)	Stadium: Lidcombe Oval; Referee: Danny Quinn (Australia)

20 June	Auckland (New Zealand)	2–5	Australia	Auckland, New Zealand
	? (?); ? (?)	Report	Cameron (?); Smith (?); Donaldson (?)	Stadium: Blandford Park; Attendance: 4,000; Referee: A. Kyle (New Zealand)

23 June	Wellington (New Zealand)	1–9	Australia	Wellington, New Zealand
	Gendall (?)	Report	Forrest 6'; Price (?); Smith (?); Harden (?); Wilkinson (?)	Stadium: Basin Reserve; Attendance: 8,000; Referee: J. Graham (New Zealand)

27 June	Canterbury (New Zealand)	1–7	Australia	Christchurch, New Zealand
	Adam (?)	Report	Smith (?); Evans (?); Wilkinson (?); Cameron (?); Price (?); Donaldson (?)	Stadium: English Park; Attendance: 4,000; Referee: H. Weatherhead (New Zealand)

1 July	Otago (New Zealand)	2–5	Australia	Dunedin, New Zealand
	Duncan (?); Skinner (?)	Report	White (?); Smith (?); Price (?)	Stadium: Logan Park; Attendance: 2,000

8 July	Westland (New Zealand)	0–9	Australia	Greymouth, New Zealand
		Report	Price (?); Smith (?); White (?); Wilkinson (?); Bryant (?)	Stadium: Rugby Park; Attendance: 2,000; Referee: S. Hewison (New Zealand)

15 July	Taranaki (New Zealand)	3–8	Australia	Hāwera, New Zealand
	Collingwood (?); Beckett (?); Starling (?)	Report	Cameron (?); Wilkinson (?); Forrest (?); Bryant (?)	Stadium: Hāwera Showgrounds; Referee: S. Stewart (New Zealand)

22 July	South Auckland (New Zealand)	1–13	Australia	Hamilton, New Zealand
	A. Donaldson (?)	Report	Smith (?); White (?); Forrest (?); Cameron (?); Clark (?)	Stadium: Rugby Park; Referee: F. Marsh (New Zealand)

25 July	Wanganui (New Zealand)	1–9	Australia	Wanganui, New Zealand
	Mackie (?)	Report	Smith (?); White (?); Cameron (?); Osborne (?); McNabb (?)	Stadium: Cooks Gardens; Attendance: 2,000; Referee: G. Langslow (New Zealand)

29 July	Wairarapa (New Zealand)	2–13	Australia	Masterton, New Zealand
	? (?); ? (?)	Report	Smith (?); Cameron (?); White (?)	Stadium: Memorial Park; Referee: N. Heyes (New Zealand)

8 August	Sydney Metro	2–4	Australia	Sydney, Australia
	Crowhurst (?); Hughes (?)	Report	Smith (?); Price (?)	Stadium: Arlington Recreation Ground

=== 1937 ===
10 July	Australia	5–4	England Amateurs	Sydney, Australia
	Hughes 1', 6'; Price 30'; Smith 39' (?)	Report	Matthews (?); Eastham (?)	Stadium: Sydney Cricket Ground; Attendance: 37,295; Referee: H. Reay (Australia)

17 July	Australia	0–4	England Amateurs	Brisbane, Australia
		Report	Matthews (?); Eastham (?); Finch (?)	Stadium: Exhibition Ground; Attendance: 25,000

20 July	Australia	4–3	England Amateurs	Newcastle, Australia
	Smith (?); Hughes 46'	Report	Matthews (?); Riley (?)	Stadium: Newcastle Number 1 Sports Ground; Attendance: 15,000; Referee: G. Saunders (Australia)

24 July	Australia	3–4	England Amateurs	Melbourne, Australia
	Smith 22'; Hughes (?); Anderson (?)	Report	Thornton 51', 80'; Matthews (?); Eastham (?)	Stadium: Melbourne Cricket Ground; Attendance: 11,000

=== 1939 ===
8 July	Australia	7–5	(Mandatory Palestine) Maccabi Tel Aviv	Sydney, Australia
	Quill (?); Reznik (?); Crowhurst (?); Hughes (?); Osborne (?); Wilkinson (?); Wynn (?)	Report	Erlich (?); Schneiderovitch (?); Machlis (?)	Stadium: Sydney Cricket Ground; Attendance: 14,896

15 July	Australia	2–1	(Mandatory Palestine) Maccabi Tel Aviv	Brisbane, Australia
	Crowhurst 65'; Hughes 75'	Report	Neufeld 55'	Stadium: Exhibition Ground; Referee: J. Perotte (Australia)

22 July	Australia	1–2	(Mandatory Palestine) Maccabi Tel Aviv	Sydney, Australia
	Hughes 70'	Report	Neufeld (?); Ginzburg (?)	Stadium: Sydney Cricket Ground; Attendance: 6,975; Referee: Danny Quinn (Australia)

29 July	Australia	4–1	(Mandatory Palestine) Maccabi Tel Aviv	Newcastle, Australia
	Quill (?); Crowhurst (?); Wilkinson (?)	Report	Erlich (?)	Stadium: Newcastle Number 1 Sports Ground; Attendance: 11,000; Referee: W. Tromans (Australia)

5 August	Australia	4–4	(Mandatory Palestine) Maccabi Tel Aviv	Melbourne, Australia
	G. Smith 5', 46'; Hughes 20'; White 48'	Report	Ginzburg 8'; Fuchs 22'; Erlich 35'; Neufeld 45'	Stadium: St Kilda Oval; Referee: T. Burns (Australia)

== 1940s ==
=== 1941 ===
28 June	Australia	4–6	China	Melbourne, Australia
	Wilkinson (?); Magee (?)	Report	Lai Shiu-wing (?); Hi Ven-kui (?); Evans (?)	Stadium: Melbourne Cricket Ground; Attendance: 5,000; Referee: E. Hayden (Australia)

5 July	Australia	4–2	China	Sydney, Australia
	Hughes (?); Wilkinson 53'; Quill 73'	Report	Cho Chow-ting 3'; Hi Ven-kui (?)	Stadium: Sydney Cricket Ground; Attendance: 25,000; Referee: W. Tromans (Australia)

12 July	Australia	2–5	China	Sydney, Australia
	Lonergan (?)	Report	Cho Chow-ting (?); Lai Shiu-wing (?); Hi Ven-kui (?); Fung King-cheung (?); Yeung Shui-yik 89'	Stadium: Sydney Cricket Ground

19 July	Australia	5–2	China	Newcastle, Australia
	Lonergan (?); Wilkinson (?); Crowhurst (?)	Report	Yeung Shiu-yik (?); Hi Ven-kui (?)	Stadium: Newcastle Number 1 Sports Ground

2 August	Australia	8–4	China	Brisbane, Australia
	Lonergan (?); Barnett (?); Wilkinson (?); Lawrie (?)	Report	Lai Shiu-wing (?); Yeung Shui-yik (?)	Stadium: Exhibition Ground

=== 1947 ===
26 April	Australia	2–3	South Africa	Adelaide, Australia
	Castle 15'; Date (?)	Report	Clack 25'; Anley (?); Claassens (?)	Stadium: Norwood Oval; Attendance: 9,000; Referee: Bob Telfer (Australia)

30 April	Australia	4–5	South Africa	Melbourne, Australia
	Date 20' (?); Cunningham (?)	Report	Claassens 5', 28'; Clack 30' (?); Wilson 80'	Stadium: Melbourne Cricket Ground; Attendance: 6,000; Referee: C. Armstrong (Australia)

=== 1948 ===
12 June	Northern Districts (New Zealand)	3–6	Australia	Newcastle, Australia
	Johnston (?); Kemp (?)	Report	Date (?); Gilbert (?); Iredale (?); Deed (?)	Stadium: New Lambton Oval; Referee: Harold S. Parker (Australia)

13 June	Australia	2–5	(Australia) The Rest	Wallsend, Australia
	Bool (?); Marshall (?)	Report	Nunn (?)	Stadium: Crystal Palace Ground; Referee: William McWilliams (Australia)

14 June	Sydney Metro (Australia)	5–5	Australia	Sydney, Australia
	Robertson (?); Mossman (?); Iredale (?)	Report	Gilbert (?); Sanders (?); Donsky (?); Cunningham (?)	Stadium: Sydney Cricket Ground; Referee: Dick Thorpe (Australia)

7 August	Auckland (New Zealand)	0–5	Australia	Auckland, New Zealand
		Report	Parsons (?); Johns (?); Cunningham (?); Hutchinson (?)	Stadium: Blandford Park; Referee: F. O. Green (New Zealand)

11 August	Minor Associations (New Zealand)	1–6	Australia	Palmerston North, New Zealand
	Warman (?)	Report	Johns (?); Nunn (?); Hodge (?)	Stadium: Palmerston North Showgrounds; Referee: A. M. Thomson (New Zealand)

18 August	Canterbury (New Zealand)	1–3	Australia	Christchurch, New Zealand
	McAnulty (?)	Report	Johns (?); Parsons (?)	Stadium: Lancaster Park; Referee: T. Mathie (New Zealand)

21 August	South Island Minor Associations (New Zealand)	0–11	Australia	Timaru, New Zealand
	Parsons (?); Cunningham (?); Johns (?); Hodge (?); Hughes (?); Marston 47' (pen.)	Report		Stadium: Fraser Park; Referee: M. Cassin (New Zealand)

25 August	Otago (New Zealand)	0–6	Australia	Dunedin, New Zealand
		Report	Cunningham (?); Parsons (?); Marston 44' (pen.)	Stadium: Caledonian Ground; Referee: W. H. Dodd (New Zealand)

1 September	Wellington (New Zealand)	1–7	Australia	Wellington, New Zealand
	Bell (?)	Report	Nunn (?); Hodge (?); Cunningham (?); Hughes (?)	Stadium: Basin Reserve; Referee: J. Duncan (New Zealand)

8 September	Rotorua (New Zealand)	0–13	Australia	Rotorua, New Zealand
		Report	Parsons (?); Nunn (?); Hodge (?); Johns (?); Duncan (?); Lawrie (?)	Stadium: Kirau Reserve; Referee: F. Killen (New Zealand)

13 September	Auckland (New Zealand)	0–8	Australia	Auckland, New Zealand
		Report	Nunn (?); Hughes (?); Parsons (?); Hodge (?)	Stadium: Blandford Park; Referee: E. Page (New Zealand)

=== 1949 ===
30 July	Australia	2–3	(Socialist Federal Republic of Yugoslavia) Hajduk Split	Sydney, Australia
	Nunn 51'; Johns 60'	Report	Drvodjelic (?); Luštica 82'; Vukas 88'	Stadium: Royal Agricultural Ground; Attendance: 27,000; Referee: Frank Chidgey (Australia)

6 August	Australia	0–3	(Socialist Federal Republic of Yugoslavia) Hajduk Split	Melbourne, Australia
		Report	Vukas 1'; Andrijasevic 55'; Matošić 80'	Stadium: Melbourne Cricket Ground; Attendance: 11,829; Referee: F. Westley (Australia)

13 August	Australia	0–6	(Socialist Federal Republic of Yugoslavia) Hajduk Split	Adelaide, Australia
		Report	Matošić (?); Vukas (?); Vidjak (?); Andrijasevic (?); Drvodjelic (?)	Stadium: Thebarton Oval; Attendance: 10,000; Referee: J. Harvey (Australia)

27 August	Australia	3–6	(Socialist Federal Republic of Yugoslavia) Hajduk Split	Brisbane, Australia
	Parsons 36' (pen.); Bignall (?); Sanders (?)	Report	Mrcic (?); Andrijasevic (?); Matošić (?); Luštica (?)	Stadium: Exhibition Ground; Attendance: 17,000; Referee: A. Hall (Australia)

3 September	Australia	2–1	(Socialist Federal Republic of Yugoslavia) Hajduk Split	Newcastle, Australia
	Robertson (?); Nunn (?)	Report	Matošić (?)	Stadium: Newcastle Sportsground; Attendance: 11,256; Referee: William McWilliams (Australia)

10 September	Australia	2–3	(Socialist Federal Republic of Yugoslavia) Hajduk Split	Sydney, Australia
	Nunn 3'; Johns (?)	Report	Andrijasevic 2'; Vukas 24'; Matošić 55'	Stadium: Royal Agricultural Ground; Attendance: 12,150; Referee: Frank Chidgey (Australia)

17 September	Australia	0–1	(Socialist Federal Republic of Yugoslavia) Hajduk Split	Sydney, Australia
		Report	Matošić 35'	Stadium: Royal Agricultural Ground; Attendance: 5,000; Referee: Frank Chidgey (Australia)

== 1950s ==
=== 1950 ===
3 May	Australia	7–1	(Australia) Fremantle City XI	Fremantle, Australia
	Nunn (?); Hulme (?)	Report	Croft (?)	Stadium: Stevens Reserve

24 May	Western Province (South Africa)	1–2	Australia	Cape Town, South Africa
	Bingle (?)	Report	Nunn 15', 16'	Stadium: Hartleyvale Stadium; Attendance: 10,500; Referee: B. Gardner (South Africa)

27 May	Southern Transvaal (South Africa)	1–1	Australia	Johannesburg, South Africa
	Montgomery 41'	Report	Parsons 75'	Stadium: Ellis Park Stadium; Attendance: 23,000; Referee: Jimmy Dove (South Africa)

31 May	Northern Transvaal (South Africa)	5–3	Australia	Pretoria, South Africa
	Holz 6', 24' (?); Venter 27'; Claassens (?)	Report	Nunn 11' (pen.); Oelofse (?)	Stadium: Caledonian Ground; Attendance: 13,000

3 June	Natal (South Africa)	2–1	Australia	Durban, South Africa
	Palmer 14'; Stewart 72'	Report	Lawrie 50'	Stadium: Kingsmead Cricket Ground; Attendance: 18,000

7 June	Orange Free State (South Africa)	1–2	Australia	Bloemfontein, South Africa
	Pretorius 32' (pen.)	Report	Johns 10'; Parsons 66'	Stadium: Springbok Park

10 June	Eastern Transvaal (South Africa)	2–2	Australia	Benoni, South Africa
	Botha 10' (pen.); Paton 45'	Report	Robertson 46'; Jack 77' (pen.)	Stadium: Willowmoore Park; Attendance: 15,000; Referee: Fowler (South Africa)

21 June	Natal (South Africa)	3–2	Australia	Maritzburg, South Africa
	Carr 60'; Little 61'; Palmer 75'	Report	Parsons (?), 77'	Stadium: Alexandra Park; Attendance: 6,000

28 June	North Transvaal Country Districts (South Africa)	0–9	Australia	Witbank, South Africa
		Report	Parsons (?); Robertson (?); Nunn (?); Johns (?); Sanders (?)

12 July	Griqualand West (South Africa)	3–7	Australia	Kimberley, South Africa
	Symmonds (?); Anley (?); ? (?)	Report	Parsons (?); Johns (?); Hulme (?); Robertson (?)	Stadium: De Beers Stadium

15 July	Frontier (South Africa)	0–4	Australia	East London, South Africa
		Report	Nunn 8', 42', 45'; Parsons 9'	Stadium: Jan Smuts Stadium

19 July	South Western Country Districts (South Africa)	0–13	Australia	Mossel Bay, South Africa
		Report	Nunn (?); Parsons (?); Sanders (?); Nicholls (?); Hulme (?); Robertson (?)	Attendance: 2,000

29 July	Western Province (South Africa)	3–3	Australia	Cape Town, South Africa
	Miller 25', 78'; Luck (?)	Report	Parsons 13', 31'; Nunn (?)	Stadium: Hartleyvale Stadium; Attendance: 4,000; Referee: T. Davis (South Africa)

17 August	Australia	5–1	Western Australia	Perth, Australia
	Cherry 32' (o.g.); Nunn 43', 88'; Parsons 62'; Hulme 80'	Report	A. Robertson 48'	Stadium: Subiaco Oval; Referee: A. Gilchrist (Australia)

26 August	Australia	6–0	South Australia	Adelaide, Australia
	Nunn (?); Johns (?); Robertson (?)	Report		Stadium: British Tube Mills Recreation Ground; Referee: Jack Moore (Australia)

2 September	Australia	0–3	New South Wales	Sydney, Australia
		Report	Marshall 9'; Jack 15' (o.g.); Date 80'	Stadium: Sydney Sports Ground; Attendance: 6,000; Referee: Jack McKenzie (Australia)

3 September	Australia	2–1	New South Wales	Wallsend, Australia
	Parsons 10'; Johns 24'	Report	Russell (?)	Stadium: Crystal Palace Ground; Attendance: 6,000; Referee: Harold S. Parker (Australia)

17 September	New Caledonia	1–0	Australia	Nouméa, New Caledonia
	Barthelemy 40'	Report		Stadium: Velodrome Georges Brunelet; Attendance: 4,000; Referee: E. Legrand (New Caledonia)

19 September	New Caledonia	2–4	Australia	Nouméa, New Caledonia
	? (?); ? (?)	Report	Hughes (?); ? (?)	Stadium: Velodrome Georges Brunelet; Attendance: 4,000

23 September	New Caledonia	3–1	Australia	Nouméa, New Caledonia
	Nakagawa 26'; Kosak 75'; Sakamouri (?)	Report	? (?)	Stadium: Velodrome Georges Brunelet; Attendance: 3,000; Referee: Victor Neugy (New Caledonia)

26 September	New Caledonia	2–3	Australia	Nouméa, New Caledonia
		Report		Stadium: Velodrome Georges Brunelet

=== 1951 ===
9 May	Australia	3–4	New South Wales	Sydney, Australia
	Lawrie (?); Johns (?); Nunn (?)	Report	Heaney (?); Russell (?); ? (?)	Stadium: Sydney Sports Ground; Referee: Jack McKenzie (Australia)

19 May	Australia	5–1	(Australia) The Rest	Sydney, Australia
	Wild (?); Peters (?); Nunn (?)	Report	Jack (?)	Stadium: Royal Agricultural Ground; Attendance: 42,150; Referee: H. McLeod (Australia)

26 May	Australia	1–4	(England) English FA	Sydney, Australia
	Parsons 42'	Report	Sewell 3', 15'; I. Clarke 23'; Hurst (?)	Stadium: Sydney Cricket Ground; Attendance: 46,104; Referee: Ron Wright (Australia)

11 June	Australia	1–6	(England) English FA	Melbourne, Australia
	McKenzie 49'	Report	I. Clarke (?); Sewell (?); Smith (?)	Stadium: Richmond Cricket Ground; Attendance: 29,000; Referee: H. Gaskell (Australia)

23 June	Australia	1–13	(England) English FA	Adelaide, Australia
	McKenzie (?)	Report	Sewell (?); Hagan (?); T. Clarke (?); Broome (?); Langton (?)	Stadium: Adelaide Oval; Attendance: 14,000; Referee: J. Harvey (Australia)

30 June	Australia	0–17	(England) English FA	Sydney, Australia
		Report	Sewell (?); T. Clarke (?); Hagan (?); Broome (?); Hurst (?)	Stadium: Sydney Cricket Ground; Attendance: 14,147; Referee: H. McLeod (Australia)

7 July	Australia	1–4	(England) English FA	Brisbane, Australia
	Robertson 29'	Report	I. Clarke 3', 4'; Hagan 15'; Langton (?)	Stadium: Brisbane Cricket Ground; Attendance: 23,216; Referee: J. Perotte (Australia)

14 July	Australia	1–6	(England) English FA	Sydney, Australia
	Hulme (?)	Report	Sewell 29'; Webster 39' (?), 89'; I. Clarke (?); Hurst 48'	Stadium: Sydney Cricket Ground; Attendance: 9,000; Referee: Frank Chidgey (Australia)

21 July	Australia	0–5	(England) English FA	Newcastle, Australia
		Report	I. Clarke (?); Sewell (?); Smith (?); Hurst (?)	Stadium: Newcastle Sportsground; Attendance: 7,165; Referee: H. Parker (Australia)

=== 1952 ===
30 August	Australia	2–0	Western Australia XI	Perth, Australia
	Stewart (?); Copeland (?)	Report		Stadium: WACA Ground; Attendance: 10,000; Referee: F. R. Druery (Australia)

1 September	Australia	1–1	Western Australia XI	Perth, Australia
	Duff 40'	Report	McMillan 55'	Stadium: WACA Ground; Referee: H. Baker (Australia)

=== 1953 ===
25 July	Australia	1–4	(Taiwan) Hong Kong Chinese XI	Sydney, Australia
	Stewart 35'	Report	Lee 20'; Szeto 35'; Y.F. Ho 46'; C.T. Hau (?)	Stadium: Royal Agricultural Ground; Attendance: 34,985; Referee: Ron Wright (Australia)

1 August	Australia	5–2	(Taiwan) Hong Kong Chinese XI	Newcastle, Australia
	Date 2', 65'; Nunn 20'; Lennard (?); Robertson (?)	Report	Lee (?); C.Y. Ho (?)	Stadium: Newcastle Showground; Attendance: 14,985; Referee: Bill McWilliams (Australia)

8 August	Australia	1–7	(Taiwan) Hong Kong Chinese XI	Brisbane, Australia
	Date (?)	Report	Lee 11', 36' (?); Chau] 39'; Chu 54'	Stadium: Brisbane Cricket Ground; Attendance: 12,000; Referee: J. Perotte (Australia)

15 August	Australia	3–3	(Taiwan) Hong Kong Chinese XI	Sydney, Australia
	Garside 55' (?); Robertson (?)	Report	Lee (?); C.T. Hau 60'; Chu 85'	Stadium: Royal Agricultural Ground; Attendance: 21,211; Referee: Harold Lonsdale (Australia)

29 August	Australia	2–3	(Taiwan) Hong Kong Chinese XI	Melbourne, Australia
	Wild 25' (?)	Report	Chu 18'; Lee 36'; C.T. Hau 45'	Stadium: Olympic Park Stadium; Attendance: 16,346; Referee: W. Bates (Australia)

5 September	Australia	5–0	(Taiwan) Hong Kong Chinese XI	Adelaide, Australia
	Sanders 33' (pen.); Nunn 40', 50'; Robertson 46', 88'	Report		Stadium: Prospect Oval; Referee: S. Thompson (Australia)

=== 1954 ===
7 August	Australia	1–3	New Zealand	Adelaide, Australia
	Cooper 17' (o.g.)	Report	King 46', 60', 89'	Stadium: Kensington Oval; Referee: J. Harvey (Australia)

=== 1955 ===
9 July	Australia	2–6	(Austria) Rapid Vienna	Sydney, Australia
	Robertson (?); Learmonth (?)	Report	A. Körner (?); Giesser (?); Mehsarosch (?)	Stadium: Sydney Sports Ground; Referee: Ron Wright (Australia)

16 July	Australia	1–5	(Austria) Rapid Vienna	Newcastle, Australia
	Neal 28'	Report	A. Körner (?); R. Körner (?); Dienst (?); Bertalan (?)	Stadium: Newcastle Sports Ground; Attendance: 18,517; Referee: Harold Lonsdale (Australia)

16 July	Australia	3–5	(Hong Kong) South China	Melbourne, Australia
	Loughran 4' (?); Vidovic (?)	Report	Ho (?); Mok (?); Lee (?)	Stadium: Melbourne Showgrounds; Attendance: 8,000

23 July	Australia	3–5	(Austria) Rapid Vienna	Brisbane, Australia
	Neal 44', 54'; Marston 60' (pen.)	Report	R. Körner 14'; Halla 15'; Mehsarosch 37'; Dienst (?)	Stadium: Brisbane Cricket Ground; Attendance: 11,000; Referee: Bill Malcolm (Australia)

29 July	Australia	3–5	(Hong Kong) South China	Adelaide, Australia
	Urbaniak (?); Caimpi (?); Young (?)	Report	Lee (?); Mok (?); Yiu (?); Ho (?)	Stadium: Norwood Oval; Attendance: 6,000

30 July	Australia	1–4	(Austria) Rapid Vienna	Melbourne, Australia
	Hodgson (?)	Report	R. Körner 3'; Hanappi (?); Bertalan (?); Dienst (?)	Stadium: Melbourne Showgrounds; Attendance: 8,500; Referee: Hutchinson (Australia)

6 August	Australia	0–5	(Hong Kong) South China	Brisbane, Australia
		Report	Mok (?); Szeto (?); Yiu (?); O'Neill (?)	Stadium: Brisbane Cricket Ground; Referee: Bill Malcolm (Australia)

13 August	Australia	2–8	(Austria) Rapid Vienna	Adelaide, Australia
	Johns 25'; Hodgson (?)	Report	Dienst (?); Hanappi (?); Neuhold (?)	Stadium: Kensington Oval; Attendance: 7,000

13 August	Australia	6–1	(Hong Kong) South China	Sydney, Australia
	Murphy (?); Thomas (?); Higgins (?); Almond (?)	Report	Yiu (?)	Stadium: Sydney Sports Ground; Attendance: 7,000; Referee: Jim Vickery (Australia)

17 August	Australia	3–2	(Austria) Rapid Vienna	Sydney, Australia
	Murphy (?); de Paoli (?); Loughran (?)	Report	A. Körner (?)	Stadium: Sydney Sports Ground; Referee: Sid Thorpe (Australia)

21 August	Australia	0–1	(Hong Kong) South China	Wallsend, Australia
		Report	Lee 11'	Stadium: Crystal Palace Ground; Referee: K. Irwin (Australia)

=== 1956 ===
14 July	Australia	4–1	Western Australia XI	Perth, Australia
	C. Kitching 17' (?); Vogler 43'; S. Kitching 65'	Report	Adair (?)	Stadium: Bayswater Oval; Attendance: 5,240; Referee: Ben Owenell (Australia)

17 July	Australia	3–2	South Australia XI	Adelaide, Australia
	C. Kitching (?); S. Kitching (?)	Report	Beattie (?); Rango (?)	Stadium: Norwood Oval; Referee: Karney (Australia)

19 July	Australia	3–0	(Victoria (state)) Victoria XI	Melbourne, Australia
		Report		Stadium: Melbourne Showgrounds; Attendance: 300; Referee: Rodger Carr (Australia)

21 July	Australia	15–1	Tasmania XI	Hobart, Australia
	C. Kitching (?); McMillan (?); S. Kitching (?); Vogler (?); Thomas (?); Sander (?)	Report	Patterson (?)	Stadium: South Hobart Ground; Referee: G. Evans (Australia)

22 July	Australia	3–0	(Victoria (state)) Victoria XI	Melbourne, Australia
	Brown (?); McMillan (?); Sander 44'	Report		Stadium: South Melbourne Cricket Ground; Attendance: 4,000; Referee: Len Young (Australia)

4 August	Australia	5–2	Queensland XI	Brisbane, Australia
	Beattie (?); Wild (?); Lennard (?)	Report		Stadium: Heath Park; Attendance: 3,000; Referee: Bill Malcolm (Australia)

5 August	Australia	3–4	New South Wales XI	Sydney, Australia
	Loughran (?); Stone (?)	Report	Stewart (?); Neal 73'	Stadium: Sydney Sports Ground; Referee: Ron Wright (Australia)

18 August	Australia	1–2	New South Wales XI	Sydney, Australia
	McMillan 76'	Report	Neal 5', 62' (pen.); Morrow 25'	Stadium: Sydney Sports Ground; Referee: Herbert Imlay (Australia)

19 August	Australia	1–0	New South Wales XI	Sydney, Australia
	McMillan (?)	Report		Stadium: Sydney Sports Ground; Referee: Herbert Imlay (Australia)

15 November	Australia	1–15	Soviet Union	Melbourne, Australia
	Sander 7'	Report		Stadium: Melbourne Showgrounds; Attendance: 6,000; Referee: Len Young (Australia)

19 November	Australia	1–3	Great Britain	Melbourne, Australia
	Sander 7'	Report	Hardisty (?); Lewin (?); Lewis (?)	Stadium: Campbell Reserve; Referee: Len Young (Australia)

20 November	Australia	3–1	India	Melbourne, Australia
		Report		Stadium: Campbell Reserve; Referee: Len Young (Australia)

23 November	Australia	1–5	Yugoslavia	Melbourne, Australia
		Report		Stadium: Campbell Reserve; Referee: Len Young (Australia)

25 November	Australia	3–4	India	Melbourne, Australia
		Report		Stadium: Campbell Reserve; Referee: Len Young (Australia)

28 November	Australia	3–3	West Germany	Melbourne, Australia
		Report		Stadium: Olympic Village Oval; Referee: Len Young (Australia)

29 November	Australia	x–x (Note: The second match against West Germany on 29 November may not have been a full match. No score was recorded for this match.)	West Germany	Melbourne, Australia
		Report		Stadium: Olympic Village Oval; Referee: Len Young (Australia)

6 December	Australia	7–2	(United Kingdom) HMS Newcastle	Melbourne, Australia
		Report		Stadium: Campbell Reserve; Referee: Len Young (Australia)

=== 1957 ===
29 June	Australia	3–2	Austria Wien	Wallsend, Australia
	Nunn (?); S. Kitching 46'; Marston 77' (pen.)	Report	Sabetzer 70'; Malik 88'	Stadium: Crystal Palace Ground; Attendance: 8,200; Referee: Keith Urwin (Australia)

6 July	Australia	3–8	Austria Wien	Sydney, Australia
	S. Kitching 9'; Marston (?); Rappel (?)	Report	Baumgartner (?); Mathesz (?); Sabetzer (?); Szalay (?)	Stadium: Sydney Cricket Ground; Attendance: 9,000; Referee: Herbert Imlay (Australia)

6 July	Australia	0–3	(Hungary) Ferencváros	Adelaide, Australia
		Report	Kertesz (?); Szigeti 60', 65'	Stadium: Prospect Oval; Attendance: 8,000

10 July	Australia	2–3	(Hungary) Ferencváros	Hobart, Australia
	Gmelch (?); Paterson (?)	Report	? (?); ? (?); ? (?)	Stadium: North Hobart Oval; Attendance: 3,000

13 July	Australia	4–1	(Hong Kong) Eastern Athletic	Sydney, Australia
	Drinkwater 57', 85', 90'; Nunn 65'	Report	Kwok Yau 8'	Stadium: Sydney Sports Ground; Attendance: 6,727

20 July	Australia	2–2	(Hong Kong) Eastern Athletic	Brisbane, Australia
	McMillan 2'; S. Kitching 73'	Report	Yeung 20'; Chau 88'	Stadium: Brisbane Cricket Ground; Attendance: 8,500

31 July	Australia	1–6	(Hungary) Ferencváros	Sydney, Australia
	Morrow 5'	Report	Borsos 23', 33', 66'; Orosz 25' (?); Warren (?)	Stadium: Sydney Cricket Ground; Attendance: 1,044; Referee: Herbert Imlay (Australia)

3 August	Australia	2–9	(Hungary) Ferencváros	Sydney, Australia
	Morrow 48'; Lennard 50'	Report	Friedmanszky 10', 33', 39', 83'; Kertesz 16'; Gerendas 37'; Szigeti (?)	Stadium: Lambert Park; Attendance: 3,788; Referee: Bill Jameson (Australia)

7 August	Australia	2–2	(Hong Kong) Eastern Athletic	Hobart, Australia
	Oakes 16'; Gmelch 85' (pen.)	Report	Kwok Yau 4'; Law 14'	Stadium: North Hobart Oval

10 August	Australia	2–1	(Hong Kong) Eastern Athletic	Melbourne, Australia
	Loughran (?); de Bruyckere (?)	Report	Yeung (?)	Stadium: Olympic Park; Attendance: 2,672; Referee: Geoff Harrison (Australia)

17 August	Australia	1–5	Austria Wien	Sydney, Australia
	Morrow 24'	Report	Baumgartner 37' (?); Malik 42' (?); Szalay 44'	Stadium: Sydney Cricket Ground; Attendance: 3,903

=== 1958 ===
3 May	Australia	2–5	(England) Blackpool	Sydney, Australia
	Loughran (?); Morrow (?)	Report	Charnley 17'; Perry 35', 70'; Hagan (?); Starkey (?)	Stadium: Sydney Sports Ground; Attendance: 24,000; Referee: Herbert Imlay (Australia)

10 May	Australia	2–8	(England) Blackpool	Sydney, Australia
	Nunn 5', 14'	Report	Charnley 25', 28', 52'; Perry 35' (?); Hagan (?); Starkey (?); Matthews 88'	Stadium: Sydney Sports Ground; Attendance: 17,879; Referee: Keith Urwin (Australia)

17 May	Australia	2–4	(England) Blackpool	Brisbane, Australia
	Marston 53' (pen.); Vogler (?)	Report	Hagan 23' (?); H. Kelly (?); Perry 83'	Stadium: Brisbane Cricket Ground; Attendance: 16,700

24 May	Australia	0–1	(England) Blackpool	Adelaide, Australia
		Report	Charnley 30'	Stadium: Adelaide Oval; Attendance: 18,000

31 May	Australia	0–7	(England) Blackpool	Melbourne, Australia
		Report	Hagan (?); Starkey (?); Matthews (?); Fenton (?); Wright (?)	Stadium: Olympic Park Stadium; Attendance: 22,000

2 August New Zealand Tour	Auckland Province (New Zealand)	2–1	Australia	New Zealand
		Report

5 August New Zealand Tour	Wellington (New Zealand)	2–2	Australia	New Zealand
		Report

7 August New Zealand Tour	Nelson Combined (New Zealand)	0–6	Australia	New Zealand
		Report

9 August New Zealand Tour	South Island (New Zealand)	0–3	Australia	New Zealand
		Report

12 August New Zealand Tour	South Canterbury Combined (New Zealand)	0–10	Australia	New Zealand
		Report

13 August New Zealand Tour	Canterbury Province (New Zealand)	0–8	Australia	New Zealand
		Report

19 August New Zealand Tour	Taranaki Combined (New Zealand)	1–8	Australia	New Zealand
		Report

21 August New Zealand Tour	Waikato (New Zealand)	2–5	Australia	New Zealand
		Report

=== 1959 ===
9 May	Australia	1–7	(Scotland) Heart of Midlothian	Sydney, Australia
	Vogler 82'	Report	Murray 3'; Bauld 33'; Crawford 51', 85'; Young 67'; Cumming (?); Hamilton (?)	Stadium: Sydney Sports Ground; Attendance: 16,212; Referee: Stanislav Liebermann (Australia)

10 May	Australia	1–6	(Scotland) Heart of Midlothian	Wallsend, Australia
	McMillan 50'	Report	Bauld 20', 40', 80'; Crawford 25'; Blackwood 85'; Wardhaugh (?)	Stadium: Crystal Palace; Attendance: 10,210

16 May	Australia	1–7	(Scotland) Heart of Midlothian	Brisbane, Australia
	Kitching (?)	Report	Young (?); Hamilton (?); Bauld (?); Thomson (?); Murray (?); Pagani (?)	Stadium: Brisbane Cricket Ground

23 May	Australia	1–7	(Scotland) Heart of Midlothian	Sydney, Australia
	Hearn (?)	Report	Wardhaugh 22', 24', 47'; Bauld 42'; Murray 46'; Young 56', 61'	Stadium: Sydney Sports Ground; Attendance: 7,057

30 May	Australia	1–9	(Scotland) Heart of Midlothian	Melbourne, Australia
	Hume 85'	Report	Hamilton (?); Young (?); Murray (?); Wardhaugh (?); Crawford (?)	Stadium: Olympic Park; Attendance: 17,500; Referee: Luigi Cadelli (Australia)

6 June	Australia	0–6	(Scotland) Heart of Midlothian	Adelaide, Australia
		Report	Wardhaugh (?); Crawford (?); Thomson (?); Young (?)	Stadium: Adelaide Oval; Attendance: 13,000; Referee: F.Ward (Australia)

13 June	Australia	0–9	(Scotland) Heart of Midlothian	Perth, Australia
		Report	Young (?); Bauld (?); Crawford (?); Blackwood (?); Cumming (?)	Stadium: WACA Ground; Attendance: 10,500; Referee: R.Mentlein (Australia)

== 1960s ==
=== 1964 ===
6 May	Ringwood Wilhelmina (Australia)	3–4	Australia	Melbourne, Australia
		Report	Barnett (?); Ninaus (?); Baumgartner (?)	Stadium: Jubilee Park

10 May	Australia	2–8	(England) Everton	Melbourne, Australia
	Ninaus 33', 80'	Report	Gabriel 14', 63', 84'; Vernon 29', 43' (pen.), 89'; Temple 35', 87'	Stadium: Olympic Park; Attendance: 32,453; Referee: Tony Boskovic (Australia)

16 May	Australia	1–5	(England) Everton	Sydney, Australia
	Ninaus 18'	Report	Gabriel 11'; Scott 46'; Harvey 48'; Morissey 58', 72'	Stadium: Royal Agricultural Ground; Attendance: 39,794; Referee: Roger Lamb (Australia)

=== 1965 ===
25 February	Australia	0–2	(Soviet Union) Torpedo Moscow	Perth, Australia
		Report	Solovyev 37'; Sergeyev 69'	Stadium: WACA Ground; Attendance: 12,000; Referee: E. Bude (Australia)

22 May	Australia	2–2	(England) Chelsea	Sydney, Australia
	Blitz 30'; Watkiss 76'	Report	Osgood 9'; Upton 84'	Stadium: Royal Agricultural Ground; Attendance: 20,637; Referee: Harold Parsons (Australia)

30 May	Australia	1–1	(England) Chelsea	Melbourne, Australia
	Watkiss (?)	Report	Bridges (?)	Stadium: Olympic Park; Attendance: 12,000; Referee: G. Lamb (Australia)

24 October	Far North Queensland (Australia)	0–17	Australia	Cairns, Australia
		Report	Herczeg (?); Watkiss (?); Blue (?); Warren (?); Anderson (?); Sleight (?)	Stadium: Parramatta Park; Attendance: 1,500

31 October	Herbert River-Roma (Australia)	0–12	Australia	Ingham, Australia
		Report	McMeechan (?); Herczeg (?); Blue (?); Watkiss (?); Anderson (?); Ackerley (?); Sleight (?)	Stadium: Ingham Showground; Attendance: 4,250

3 December	Hong Kong	1–3	Australia	Causeway Bay, Hong Kong
	Cheung Chi-wai 50' (pen.)	Report	Blue 5', 7', 58'	Stadium: Government Stadium; Attendance: 13,800; Referee: Fred Pratlett (Hong Kong)

=== 1966 ===
13 June	Australia	1–1	(Italy) Roma	Sydney, Australia
	Morrow 66'	Report	Tamborini 88'	Stadium: Royal Agricultural Ground; Attendance: 5,469; Referee: Roger Lamb (Australia)

=== 1967 ===
17 November South East Asia tour	Indonesian Federation Select XI (Indonesia)	0–2	Australia	Jakarta, Indonesia
		Report	Baartz 37'; Abonyi 43'	Stadium: Gelora Senayan Main Stadium; Attendance: 20,000; Referee: Tony Boskovic (Australia)

19 November South East Asia tour	Jakarta Select XI (Indonesia)	1–3	Australia	Jakarta, Indonesia
	Komor 67'	Report	Vojtek 1', 74'; Warren 6'	Attendance: 35,000; Referee: Tony Boskovic (Australia)

23 November South East Asia tour	Singapore Combined Services	1–8	Australia	Kallang, Singapore
	Tutten (?)	Report	Schaefer 10'; Westwater 33'; Vojtek 35', 56'; Richards 49'; McColl 60'; Abonyi 78', 80'	Stadium: Jalan Besar Stadium; Attendance: 1,000

=== 1969 ===
3 June	Northern New South Wales	2–2	Australia	Newcastle, Australia
	Irving 34'; Ahrens 80'	Report	Manuel (?); Johnson 70'	Stadium: Macquarie Field; Referee: Peter Rampley (Australia)

25 June	Sydney XI	1–2	Australia	Sydney, Australia
	Denton 72'	Report	Warren 9'; Alagich 44'	Stadium: ES Marks Athletics Field; Attendance: 3,087; Referee: Peter Rampley (Australia)

3 September	New South Wales Federation XI	1–1	Australia	Sydney, Australia
	McCulloch (?)	Report	Vojtek (?)	Stadium: ES Marks Athletics Field; Attendance: 800; Referee: Tony Boskovic (Australia)

17 September	New South Wales Federation XI	2–0	Australia	Sydney, Australia
	Griffiths (?); McCulloch (?)	Report		Stadium: ES Marks Athletics Field; Attendance: 200

== 1970s ==
=== 1970 ===
25 April Friendship Cup	Kowloon Bus Company (Hong Kong)	2–6	Australia	Saigon, South Vietnam
	Lo Shung Kung 64' (pen.); Ng Yu Yan 74'	Report	Alston 29', 36', 38'; McKinnon 23', 51'; Armstrong 89'	Stadium: Cong Hoa Stadium; Attendance: 30,000; Referee: Tony Boskovic (Australia)

26 April Friendship Cup	South Vietnam Army	0–1	Australia	Saigon, South Vietnam
		Report	Alston 42'	Stadium: Cong Hoa Stadium; Attendance: 35,000

29 April	Western Australia	2–6	Australia	Perth, Australia
	Van Oosten 10'; O'Callaghan (?)	Report	Quested (?); Armstrong (?); Warren (?); Alston (?); Vojtek (?); Manuel (?)	Stadium: Lake Monger Velodrome

23 October World Tour	New Caledonia	1–3	Australia	Nouméa, New Caledonia
	Poithily 5'	Report	Warren 15'; Richards 60'; Vojtek 70'	Stadium: Stade de Magenta; Attendance: 2,400; Referee: André Nakagawa (New Caledonia)

25 October World Tour	New Caledonia	0–1	Australia	Nouméa, New Caledonia
		Report	Doyle 73'	Stadium: Stade de Magenta; Attendance: 2,290; Referee: Roger Bataille (New Caledonia)

28 October World Tour	Jardine Sports Club (Hong Kong)	0–3	Australia	Hong Kong
		Report	Vojtek 18', 61'; Blues 81'	Stadium: Government Stadium; Attendance: 16,980; Referee: Lee Kan-chee (Hong Kong)

30 October World Tour	Macau	0–9	Australia	Macau
		Report	Denton (?); Warren (?); Keddie (?); Blues (?); Irvine (?)	Attendance: 4,000

2 November World Tour	Oghab Tehran (Iran)	0–0	Australia	Tehran, Iran
		Report		Attendance: 17,000; Referee: Jafar Namdar (Iran)

4 November World Tour	Persepolis (Iran)	1–2	Australia	Tehran, Iran
	Parvin 16' (pen.)	Report	Richards 8'; Alston 48'	Stadium: Amjadieh Stadium; Attendance: 22,000; Referee: Davoud Nasiri (Iran)

6 November World Tour	Tehran XI (Iran)	3–3	Australia	Tehran, Iran
	Yavari 20' (pen.), 61'; Mirza-Hassan 60'	Report	Doyle 26'; Denton 40', 71'	Attendance: 17,000; Referee: Arhad Barzani (Iran)

11 November World Tour	Hapoel Haifa (Israel)	1–2	Australia	Haifa, Israel
	Atzmon 90' (pen.)	Report	Richards 10'; Keddie 40'	Stadium: Kiryat Eliezer Stadium; Attendance: 7,000; Referee: Avraham Klein (Israel)

19 November World Tour	Greece B	1–1	Australia	Kavala, Greece
	Davourlis 57'	Report	Alston 43'	Stadium: Kavala Stadium; Attendance: 12,000; Referee: George Katsouris (Greece)

23 November World Tour	Luton Town (England)	1–2	Australia	Luton, England
	Macdonald 28'	Report	Denton 35'; Alston 83'	Stadium: Kenilworth Road; Attendance: 6,416; Referee: Ray Sheppard (England)

25 November World Tour	Manchester City Reserves (England)	2–0	Australia	Manchester, England
	Smith 5'; Brennan 56'	Report		Stadium: Maine Road; Attendance: 4,000; Referee: Anthony Morrissey (England)

27 November World Tour	League of Ireland (Republic of Ireland)	1–0	Australia	Dublin, Ireland
	Hale 26'	Report		Stadium: Dalymount Park; Attendance: 7,500; Referee: D. V. Byrne (Republic of Ireland)

=== 1971 ===
13 June	Australia	0–1	(England) English FA	Sydney, Australia
		Report	Watson 52'	Stadium: Sydney Sports Ground; Attendance: 16,775; Referee: Tony Boskovic (Australia)

20 June	Australia	0–1	(England) English FA	Melbourne, Australia
		Report	Watson 31'	Stadium: Olympic Park; Attendance: 12,216; Referee: Geoff Harrison (Australia)

=== 1972 ===
17 May	Australia	1–2	(Scotland) Dundee	Adelaide, Australia
	Alston 27'	Report	Wilson 3'; J. Scott 18'	Attendance: 6,000; Referee: Don Campbell (Australia)

11 June	Australia	1–0	(England) Wolverhampton Wanderers	Melbourne, Australia
	Abonyi 84'	Report		Stadium: Olympic Park; Attendance: 10,269; Referee: Roger Lamb (Australia)

12 June	Australia	2–2	(England) Wolverhampton Wanderers	Sydney, Australia
	Baartz 1', 36'	Report	McAlle 7'; Curran 73'	Stadium: Sydney Sports Ground; Attendance: 18,885; Referee: Tony Boskovic (Australia)

17 June	Australia	2–2	(Brazil) Santos	Sydney, Australia
	Rooney 35'; Baartz 65'	Report	Orlando 32'; Edu 60'	Stadium: Sydney Sports Ground; Attendance: 31,755; Referee: Tony Boskovic (Australia)

14 October South East Asia Tour	South Vietnam U23	0–2	Australia	Saigon, South Vietnam
		Report	Buljevic 63', 86'	Attendance: 13,000; Referee: Le Ngoc (South Vietnam)

=== 1973 ===
14 February	Australia	2–2	Bulgaria	Sydney, Australia
	Buljevic 56'; Tolson 72' (pen.)	Report	Vasilev 31'; Mihaylov 44'	Stadium: Sydney Sports Ground; Attendance: 14,163; Referee: Roger Lamb (Australia)

16 February	Australia	1–3	Bulgaria	Adelaide, Australia
	Baartz 29'	Report	Bogomilov 22'; Pritargov 27'; Mihaylov 81'	Stadium: Hindmarsh Stadium; Attendance: 8,576; Referee: Tony Boskovic (Australia)

18 February	Australia	0–2	Bulgaria	Melbourne, Australia
		Report	Pritargov 22'; Dermendzhiev 57'	Stadium: Olympic Park; Attendance: 9,204; Referee: Don Campbell (Australia)

=== 1974 ===
6 February	Australia	1–2	(Hungary) Ferencváros	Adelaide, Australia
	Eipel 9' (o.g.)	Report	Máté 3', 83'	Stadium: Hindmarsh Stadium; Attendance: 12,454; Referee: Don Campbell (Australia)

	Australia	0–0	(Hungary) Ferencváros	Sydney, Australia
10 February		Report		Stadium: Sydney Sports Ground; Attendance: 15,945; Referee: Tony Boskovic (Australia)

20 March	Australia	0–0	(New Zealand) Auckland XI	Sydney, Australia
		Report		Stadium: Sydney Sports Ground; Attendance: 2,975; Referee: Tim Davies (Australia)

4 June World Cup Preparations	St. Gallen (Switzerland)	1–4	Australia	St. Gallen, Switzerland
	Blättler 82'	Report	Guggi 66' (o.g.); Alston 69', 77', 78'	Stadium: Espenmoos; Attendance: 4,000

6 June World Cup Preparations	Young Boys (Switzerland)	0–2	Australia	Brugg, Switzerland
		Report	Richards 30'; Abonyi 78'	Stadium: Stadion Au; Attendance: 4,000; Referee: Anton Buchell (Switzerland)

8 June World Cup Preparations	Neuchâtel Xamax (Switzerland)	0–1	Australia	Neuchâtel, Switzerland
		Report	Richards 62'	Stadium: Stade de la Maladière; Attendance: 3,400; Referee: Andrew Favre (Switzerland)

=== 1975 ===
2 February	Australia	2–2	(Poland) Legia Warsaw	Sydney, Australia
	Rooney 22'; Manuel 27'	Report	Dąbrowski 41', 87'	Stadium: Sydney Sports Ground; Attendance: 14,850; Referee: Tony Boskovic (Australia)

5 February	Australia	1–2	(Poland) Legia Warsaw	Brisbane, Australia
	Rooney (?)	Report	Białas 75'; Dąbrowski 83'	Stadium: Exhibition Ground; Attendance: 8,000; Referee: Des Miles (Australia)

6 June	Australia	1–2	(Scotland) Rangers	Sydney, Australia
	Harding 82' (pen.)	Report	Parlane 40', 67'	Stadium: Sydney Cricket Ground; Attendance: 31,846; Referee: Peter Rampley (Australia)

11 June	Australia	1–0	(Scotland) Rangers	Brisbane, Australia
	Ollerton 9'	Report		Attendance: 5,000; Referee: Des Miles (Australia)

13 June Jakarta Anniversary Tournament	South Korea	1–1	Australia	Jakarta, Indonesia
	? (?)	Report	? (?)

14 June Jakarta Anniversary Tournament	Burma	2–1	Australia	Jakarta, Indonesia
	? (?); ? (?)	Report	Morgan (?)

18 June	Australia	0–4	(England) Manchester United	Sydney, Australia
		Report	Macari 27'; McIlroy (?); Daly (?); Pearson (?)	Attendance: 12,732; Referee: Tim Davies (Australia)

6 August	Australia	1–0	China	Melbourne, Australia
	Cummings 62'	Report		Stadium: Olympic Park; Attendance: 6,000; Referee: Stewart Mellings (Australia)
Note: There is conjecture as to whether this was a full A international

20 August	Australia	2–2	(Portugal) Benfica	Sydney, Australia
	Buljevic (?)	Report	? (?); ? (?)	Stadium: Sydney Sports Ground; Attendance: 12,164; Referee: Tony Boskovic (Australia)

=== 1976 ===
8 February	Australia	2–2	(Socialist Federal Republic of Yugoslavia) Velež Mostar	Sydney, Australia
	Ollerton 56'; Barnes 72'	Report	Kvesić 29', 38'	Stadium: Sydney Sports Ground; Attendance: 17,239; Referee: Tony Boskovic (Australia)

16 May	Australia	2–3	(England) Tottenham Hotspur	Sydney, Australia
	Harding 13'; Nyskohus 89'	Report	Coates (?); Neighbour (?); Jones (?)	Stadium: Sydney Sports Ground; Attendance: 23,651; Referee: Tony Boskovic (Australia)

19 May	Australia	3–4	(England) Sunderland	Sydney, Australia
	Harding 9', 39'; Abonyi 46'	Report	Robson 10', 59'; Rowell 27'; Greenwood 65'	Stadium: Sydney Sports Ground; Attendance: 7,909; Referee: Peter Rampley (Australia)

25 May	Australia	0–0	(England) Sunderland	Melbourne, Australia
		Report		Stadium: Olympic Park Stadium; Attendance: 6,500; Referee: Jim Dixon (Australia)

2 June	Australia	2–1	(Scotland) Heart of Midlothian	Sydney, Australia
	Muniz (?); Abonyi (?)	Report	Aird 72'	Stadium: Sydney Sports Ground; Attendance: 4,043; Referee: Tim Davies (Australia)

9 June	Australia	3–0	(Italy) Bologna	Adelaide, Australia
	Bell (?); Harding (?); Abonyi (?)	Report		Stadium: Hindmarsh Stadium; Attendance: 11,000; Referee: Don Campbell (Australia)

13 June	Australia	0–0	(Italy) Bologna	Sydney, Australia
		Report		Stadium: Sydney Cricket Ground; Attendance: 18,256; Referee: Tony Boskovic (Australia)

30 June	Australia	1–3	(Italy) Italian Army	Sydney, Australia
	Ollerton (?)	Report	? (?); ? (?); ? (?)	Stadium: Sydney Sports Ground; Attendance: 3,823; Referee: Tony Boskovic (Australia)

27 October Asia and Europe Tour	China XI	4–5	Australia	Beijing, China
	Li Weimiao (?); Li Wei Shsiao (?); Shen Shing Fu (?); Liu Lifu (?)	Report	Abonyi 14' (?); Kosmina (?); Bell (?)	Stadium: Workers' Stadium; Attendance: 80,000
Note: There is conjecture as to whether this was a full A international

29 October Asia and Europe Tour	China	0–2	Australia	Canton, China
		Report	Ollerton (?)	Stadium: Yuexiushan Stadium; Attendance: 35,000
Note: There is conjecture as to whether this was a full A international

6 November Asia and Europe Tour	Hamburger SV (Germany)	2–1	Australia	Hamburg, West Germany
	Ettmayer 11'; Nogly 47'	Report	Williams 80'	Stadium: Sportplatz at Rothenbaum; Attendance: 3,500; Referee: Lutz (West Germany)

9 November Asia and Europe Tour	PSV (Netherlands)	2–0	Australia	Eindhoven, Netherlands
	Edström (?); Postuma (?)	Report		Attendance: 7,000

9 November Asia and Europe Tour	KSV Baunatal (Germany)	1–1	Australia	Baunatal, West Germany
	Patzer (?)	Report	Nyskohus 50'	Stadium: Auestadion; Attendance: 4,000

15 November Asia and Europe Tour	Sunderland (England)	2–0	Australia	Baunatal, West Germany
	Rowell 47'; Greenwood 70'	Report		Stadium: Auestadion; Attendance: 4,745; Referee: Pat Partridge (England)

16 November Asia and Europe Tour	Birmingham City (England)	4–1	Australia	Birmingham, England
	Francis 26', 53'; Gallagher 19', 60'	Report	Abonyi 74'	Stadium: St Andrew's; Attendance: 9,000

=== 1977 ===
30 January	Australia	1–3	(Socialist Federal Republic of Yugoslavia) Red Star Belgrade	Sydney, Australia
	Abonyi 70'	Report	Bogićević 29', 52'; Savić 34'	Stadium: Sydney Sports Ground; Attendance: 16,228; Referee: Tony Boskovic (Australia)

2 February	Australia	1–3	(Socialist Federal Republic of Yugoslavia) Red Star Belgrade	Sydney, Australia
	Harding 89'	Report	Jovanović 37'; Ćalasan 70', 72'	Stadium: Sydney Sports Ground; Attendance: 8,252; Referee: Tim Davies (Australia)

5 February	Australia	1–3	(Socialist Federal Republic of Yugoslavia) Red Star Belgrade	Melbourne, Australia
	Kosmina 57'	Report	Jovanović 30'; Bogićević 49'; Lukić 87'	Stadium: Olympic Park; Attendance: 14,200; Referee: Jim Dixon (Australia)

5 June	Australia	0–5	(England) Middlesbrough	Sydney, Australia
		Report	McAndrew 10'; Hickton 30', 70'; Souness 52'; Maddren 88'	Stadium: Sydney Sports Ground

12 June	Australia	2–1	(England) Bobby Charlton's All Stars	Melbourne, Australia
	Barnes 20'; Harding 27' (pen.)	Report	Ball 78'	Stadium: Olympic Park; Attendance: 10,000; Referee: David Yelland (Australia)

20 July World of Soccer Cup	Australia	3–1	(England) Arsenal	Sydney, Australia
	Kosmina 22'; Nyskohus 61'; Ollerton 70'	Report	Armstrong 60'	Stadium: Sydney Sports Ground; Attendance: 11,000; Referee: Tony Boskovic (Australia)

26 July World of Soccer Cup	Australia	2–3	(Scotland) Celtic	Sydney, Australia
	Barnes (?); Ollerton (?)	Report	Eðvaldsson 3', 30'; Glavin (?)	Stadium: Sydney Sports Ground; Attendance: 12,742; Referee: Richard Lorenc (Australia)

28 July World of Soccer Cup	Australia	2–3	(Socialist Federal Republic of Yugoslavia) Red Star Belgrade	Melbourne, Australia
	Kosmina 27'; Harding 61'	Report	Savić 42'; Šestić 65'; Filipović 70'	Stadium: Olympic Park; Attendance: 10,100; Referee: Stewart Mellings (Australia)

9 October	Australia	4–4	Queensland	Brisbane, Australia
	Alston (?); Harding (?); Barnes (?); Nyskohus (?)	Report	Kelso (?); Spearritt (?); Marley (?); Morris (?)	Stadium: Perry Park; Attendance: 7,000; Referee: Dave Nugent (Australia)

=== 1979 ===
4 February	Australia	1–3	(Poland) Wisła Kraków	Sydney, Australia
	Jankovics 43'	Report	Kmiecik 13', 79'; Krupinski 55'	Stadium: Sydney Sports Ground; Attendance: 7,271; Referee: Tony Boskovic (Australia)

30 May	Queensland	0–0	Australia	Brisbane, Australia
		Report		Stadium: Perry Park; Attendance: 2,700; Referee: Col Amos (Australia)

29 June	Australia	1–1	(Socialist Federal Republic of Yugoslavia) Partizan Belgrade	Newcastle, Australia
	Cole 44' (pen.)	Report	Trifunović 16'	Stadium: Newcastle International Sports Centre; Attendance: 5,067; Referee: Jim Reeves (Australia)

1 July	Australia	0–1	(Socialist Federal Republic of Yugoslavia) Partizan Belgrade	Sydney, Australia
		Report	Varga 47'	Stadium: Sydney Sports Ground; Attendance: 9,605; Referee: Tim Davies (Australia)

24 October	Australia	2–1	(United States) New York Cosmos	Sydney, Australia
	Rooney 20'; Henderson 84'	Report	Chinaglia 75'	Stadium: Royal Agricultural Showground; Attendance: ~50,000 (43,000 official); Referee: Tony Boskovic (Australia)

10 November Asia Tour	Shandong Province (China)	1–3	Australia	Beijing, China
	Au Chen 55'	Report	Boden 56'; Cole 67'; O'Connor 67'	Stadium: Workers' Stadium; Attendance: 80,000

13 November Asia Tour	Peking (China)	2–2	Australia	Beijing, China
	Henderson 21' (o.g.); Li Fu-bao 48'	Report	Boden 40' (pen.); Cumming 66'	Attendance: 40,000

16 November Asia Tour	Shanghai (China)	2–3	Australia	Shanghai, China
	Chu Yu-hong 4'; Li Chong-hua 82'	Report	Boden 13'; Henderson 55'; Sharne 66'	Attendance: 40,000

18 November Asia Tour	Tianjin Province (China)	0–3	Australia	Shanghai, China
		Report	Krncevic 5', 23', 54'	Stadium: Shanghai Stadium; Attendance: 35,000

23 November Asia Tour	Canton Army (China)	0–1	Australia	Canton, China
		Report	Krncevic 61'	Attendance: 30,000

26 November Asia Tour	Taipei Bank (Chinese Taipei)	1–7	Australia	Taipei, Taiwan
	Sen-ur Cheung 60'	Report	Krncevic 8', 23', 33', 53', 55'; Henderson 25'; Cole 59'	Attendance: 1,500

== 1980s ==
=== 1980 ===
24 February 1980 Oceania Cup GS	New Caledonia	0–8	Australia	Noumea, New Caledonia
		Report	Moulis (?); Hunter (?); Kay (?); Krncevic (?)	Stadium: Noumea Stadium

28 February 1980 Oceania Cup GS	Australia	1–0	New Hebrides	Noumea, New Caledonia
	Krncevic 26'	Report		Stadium: Noumea Stadium

1 March 1980 Oceania Cup Final	Australia	4–2	Tahiti	Noumea, New Caledonia
	Kay 4', 29'; Moulis (?); Bozanic (?)	Report	Wabealo 11'; Bennett (?)	Stadium: Noumea Stadium

18 May	Australia	2–1	(Italy) AC Milan	Sydney, Australia
	Cole 42' (pen.); Jankovics 61'	Report	Antonelli 24'	Stadium: Sydney Sports Ground; Attendance: 15,000; Referee: Tony Boskovic (Australia)

17 November Europe Tour	England B	1–0	Australia	Birmingham, England
	Sunderland 51'	Report		Stadium: St Andrew's; Attendance: 3,292; Referee: Peter Reeves (England)

19 November Europe Tour	Fiorentina (Italy)	2–0	Australia	Florence, Italy
	Antognoni 10'; Orlandini 46'	Report		Stadium: Florence Stadium; Attendance: 6,000; Referee: Raulo Bergamo (Italy)

24 November Europe Tour	Leicester City (England)	1–2	Australia	Leicester, England
	Smith 73' (pen.)	Report	Boden 12', 38'	Stadium: Filbert Street; Attendance: 2,476; Referee: John Hunting (England)

27 November Europe Tour	Dinamo Zagreb (Socialist Federal Republic of Yugoslavia)	4–0	Australia	Zagreb, Yugoslavia
	Kovačević 8'; Cerin 25'; Munjaković 37'; Bogdan 73'	Report		Stadium: Dinamo Stadium; Attendance: 3,000; Referee: Ivan Vinder (Yugoslavia)

=== 1981 ===
31 January	Australia	3–3	(Socialist Federal Republic of Yugoslavia) Dinamo Zagreb	Canberra, Australia
	Davidson 6'; Sharne 29'; Spanos 75'	Report	Bračun 51', 64'; Bošnjak 57'	Attendance: ~7,000; Referee: B. Mee (Australia)

2 September	Caroline Hill (Hong Kong)	0–6	Australia	Hong Kong
		Report	Colusso (?); Raskopoulos (?); Mitchell (?); Koussas (?); Little (?)

=== 1983 ===
26 November	Western Australia XI	2–1	Australia	Inglewood, Australia
	McCaffrey (?); Campbell (?)	Report	Kosmina (?)

30 November	Kuala Lumpur (Malaysia)	1–4	Australia	Kuala Lumpur, Malaysia
	(unknown) (?)	Report	Kosmina (?); Henderson (?); Katholos (?)

December 1983 Merlion Cup	Singapore	1–3	Australia	Singapore
	(unknown) (?)	Report	Kosmina (?); (unknown) (?)

=== 1984 ===
26 May Exhibition game	Australia	0–0	(England) Manchester United	Sydney, Australia
				Attendance: 16,047; Referee: Peter Rampley (Australia)

27 May Exhibition game	Australia	1–2	(Scotland) Rangers	Brisbane, Australia
	Egan 38'		Clark 43'; Ferguson 74'	Stadium: Lang Park; Attendance: 2,257; Referee: Bill Monteverde (Australia)

2 June Exhibition game	Australia	3–2	(Scotland) Rangers	Brisbane, Australia
	O'Connor 22'; Kosmina 27'; Mitchell 28'		McCoist 23', 65' (pen.)	Stadium: Lang Park; Attendance: 2,257; Referee: Bill Monteverde (Australia)

7 June Exhibition game	Australia	2–2	(England) Nottingham Forest	Brisbane, Australia
	Komsina 36'; O'Connor 69'		Hodge 57' (pen.); Bowyer 66'	Stadium: Lang Park; Referee: Tim Davies (Australia)

10 June Exhibition game	Australia	1–1	(Italy) Juventus	Melbourne, Australia
	Ratcliffe 42'		Koetting 79' (pen.)	Stadium: Melbourne Cricket Ground; Attendance: 36,128; Referee: Jack Johnston (Australia)

12 June Exhibition game	Australia	2–4	(Italy) Juventus	Adelaide, Australia
	Cant 51'; Yankos 85' (pen.)		Boniek 7', 81', 88'; Rossi 48'	Stadium: Football Park; Attendance: 36,128; Referee: Jack Johnston (Australia)

16 June Exhibition game	Australia	2–0	(Italy) Juventus	Sydney, Australia
	Soper 30'; O'Connor 61'			Stadium: Sydney Cricket Ground; Attendance: 14,004; Referee: Richard Lorenc (Australia)

21 June Exhibition game	Australia	2–0	(Greece) Iraklis	Sydney, Australia
	Kosmina 19'; Cant 70'			Attendance: 8,876; Referee: (Australia)

22 June Exhibition game	Australia	1–3	(Greece) Iraklis	Adelaide, Australia
	Raskopoulos 84'		Ratcliffe 25' (o.g.); Mitosevic 49'; Galatidis 81'	Stadium: Hindmarsh Stadium; Attendance: 4,500; Referee: (Australia)

10 October Exhibition game	Tasmanian All Stars (Tasmania)	0–2	Australia	Hobart, Australia
			Gomez 35'; Senkalski 89'	Stadium: KGV Park; Attendance: 1,500; Referee: (Australia)

5 November Exhibition game	Beijing (China)	2–3	Australia	Beijing, China
			Crino (?); Egan (?)	Referee: (Australia)

7 November Exhibition game	Shanghai (China)	0–2	Australia	Shanghai, China
			Ratcliffe (?); Egan (?)	Referee: (Australia)

10 November Exhibition game	Canton (China)	2–1	Australia	Canton, China
			Crino (?)

14 November Exhibition game	Manchester City (England)	3–1	Australia	Manchester, England
		Report

18 November Exhibition game	Nottingham Forest (England)	0–0	Australia	Nottingham, England
		Report		Referee: M. Scott (England)

== 1990s ==
=== 1990 ===
19 January	Australia	0–2	(Soviet Union) Torpedo Moscow	Sydney, Australia
		Report	Savichev 16'; Gitsyelov 73'	Stadium: Sydney Football Stadium; Attendance: 7,424; Referee: Richard Lorenc (Australia)

2 February	Australia	3–0	(Soviet Union) Torpedo Moscow	Melbourne, Australia
	Tobin 19'; Arnold 38', 46'	Report		Stadium: Olympic Park; Attendance: 3,075; Referee: D Voutsinis (Australia)

3 June	Australia	1–0	(Socialist Federal Republic of Yugoslavia) Hajduk Split	Sydney, Australia
	Trimboli (?)	Report

6 June	Australia	2–2	(Socialist Federal Republic of Yugoslavia) Hajduk Split	Melbourne, Australia
	Yankos (?); Durakovic (?)	Report

20 August Indonesian Independence Cup Group Stage	Australia	3–0	Malaysia under-23	Jakarta, Indonesia
	Tapai (?); Taliadoros (?)	Report		Stadium: Sanayan Stadium

21 August Indonesian Independence Cup Group Stage	Indonesia under-23	0–7	Australia	Jakarta, Indonesia
	Zinni (?); van Blerk (?); Taliadoros (?); McCulloch (?)	Report

23 August Indonesian Independence Cup Group Stage	Thailand under-23	0–2	Australia	Jakarta, Indonesia
	McCulloch (?)	Report

=== 1999 ===
June	Australia	0–1	Australia under-23	Sydney, Australia
		Report	Wehrman 80'	Stadium: Marconi Stadium; Attendance: 800

12 June	Australia	3–2	World Stars	Sydney, Australia
	Zelic 46'; Emerton 57'; Margas 57' (o.g.)	Report	Yakin 9'; Rufer 89'	Stadium: Stadium Australia; Attendance: 88,101; Referee: Masoyoshi Okada (Japan)

15 July	Australia	0–2	(England) Manchester United	Melbourne, Australia
		Report	Blomqvist 45+1'; Butt 76'	Stadium: Melbourne Cricket Ground; Attendance: 60,000; Referee: Mark Shield (Australia)

18 July	Australia	0–1	(England) Manchester United	Sydney, Australia
		Report	Yorke 25'	Stadium: Stadium Australia

14 November	Australia	0–2	Brazil	Sydney, Australia
		Report	Álvaro 32'; Alex 39'	Stadium: Stadium Australia; Attendance: 50,325; Referee: Brett Hugo (Australia)

17 November	Australia	2–2	Brazil	Melbourne, Australia
	Agostino 11', 60'	Report	Ronaldinho 74'; Fábio Júnior 86'	Stadium: Melbourne Cricket Ground; Attendance: 70,795; Referee: Eddie Lennie (Australia)

== 2000s ==
=== 2006 ===
2 June	VV Kloetinge (Netherlands)	1–8	Australia	Kloetinge, Netherlands
	Pinas 82'	Report	Cahill 17'; Kewell 27', 82'; Aloisi 29', 74'; Kennedy 58', 71', 72'	Attendance: 3,500

=== 2008 ===
8 January	Australia	1–2	Australia U-23	Sydney, Australia
10:00	Thompson 55'	Report	Simon 35'; Zadkovich 45'	Stadium: Marconi Stadium; Attendance: 0

== 2010s ==
=== 2014 ===
2 June	Paraná Clube (Brazil)	0–2	Australia	Vitória, Brazil
		Report	Bozanic 18'; Taggart 28'	Stadium: Estádio Engenheiro Alencar Araripe; Attendance: 0
