= 1938 in Australian soccer =

Soccer in Australia
- Season: 1938

The 1936 season was the 55th season of regional competitive soccer in Australia.

== National teams ==
=== Australia men's national soccer team ===
Ahead of the first match of the 1938 series against India on 3 September at the Royal Agricultural Showground in Sydney, the Australia team selectors selected what they deemed a "powerful side" regardless of critics views of Australia's difficulty of winning the match by virtue of the strength of the India national team. The day before the first match, it was confirmed that debutant Alf Quill would be replaced by an attacker named 'Workman', and confirmed Jimmy Osborne was to play at left-half, Jock Parkes pivot, and further debutants Bill Coolahan would play right-half, and Alf Henwood playing full-back. Bill Coolhan was selected to captain the Australia team, with other debutants Alf Henwood, Alf Quill and Max Wynn Australia scored the first goal in the last minute of the first half through Jim Wilkinson leading 1–0 at half time. A. Rahim scored to draw level for India in the second half. Jack Hughes regained Australia's with a brace extending Australia's lead up to 3–1. India fought by Karuna Bhattacharya scoring again for India bringing the match back to 3–2. Alf Quill on debut scored Australia's fourth goal regaining the two goal advantage, until India reduced the deficit for the second time at 4–3 through R. Lumsden. Quill again scored with the final result as a 5–3 win for Australia.

Five new players; Cec Brittain, Lex Gibb (son of cap. no 1 Alex Gibb becoming the first father and son both capped), Fat Kitching, Tom Parry, Eric Petie were set to mark their debuts for Australia ahead of their second match against India at Brisbane Showgrounds in Brisbane. Coolahan went out of the team, so Jack Evans was chosen to captain the side on the day of the match. The match was tied 0–0 at half time, until India scored two goals in the first five minutes of the second half by Rahim and Bhattacharya. Hughes scored one back for Australia, only until India regained a two goal lead when Muhammad Noor made it 3–1. Hughes scored again bringing the game back for Australia, and Kitching on debut levelled the match 3–3. Another debutant Brittain sent Australia into the lead, however India levelled again through Lumsden, with the match finishing as a 4–4 draw.

==== Results and fixtures ====
===== Friendlies =====
3 September International Friendly	Australia	5–3	India	Sydney, Australia
15:15 AEST	Quill (?); Hughes (?); Wilkinson (?)	Report	A. Rahim (?); Bhattacharya (?); Lumsden (?)	Stadium: Royal Agricultural Showground; Attendance: 12,603; Referee: Herbert Reay (Australia)

10 September International Friendly	Australia	4–4	India	Brisbane, Australia
	Hughes (?); Kitching (?); Brittain (?)	Report	Rahim 47'; Bhattacharya 49'; Mohammed (?); Lumsden (?)	Stadium: Brisbane Exhibition Ground; Attendance: 10,412; Referee: J. Edwards (Australia)

17 September International Friendly	Australia	1–4	India	Newcastle, Australia
	Hughes (?)	Report	A. Rahim (?); Lumsden (?), 46' (pen.); Bhattacharya (?)	Stadium: Newcastle Sports Ground; Attendance: 6,255

24 September International Friendly	Australia	5–4	India	Sydney, Australia
	Hughes (?); Wilkinson (?); Bryant (?)	Report	K. Prosad; Lumsden (?)	Stadium: Royal Agricultural Showground; Attendance: 9,748

1 October International Friendly	Australia	3–1	India	Melbourne, Australia
	J. Hughes (?); Coolahan (?); McIver (?)	Report	Lumsden (?)	Stadium: Melbourne Cricket Ground; Attendance: 2,874; Referee: F.R. Thorpe (Australia)

==== Player statistics ====
Pos.	Player	Apps	Goals
GK	Jimmy McNabb	4	0
GK	Bill Morgan	1	0
FB	Jack Evans	5	0
FB	Alf Henwood	2	0
FB	Alf Mackey	1	0
FB	Aub Mascord	1	0
FB	Eric Petie	1	0
HB	Ray Bryant	1	1
HB	Bill Coolahan	3	1
HB	Ian Evans	1	0
HB	Lex Gibb	2	0
HB	Jimmy Osborne	3	0
HB	Jock Parkes	4	0
HB	Aku Roth	1	0
FW	Cec Brittain	2	1
FW	Roy Crowhurst	4	0
FW	Alec Forrest	1	0
FW	Jack Hughes	5	9
FW	Fat Kitching	1	1
FW	Frank McIver	1	0
FW	Tom Parry	1	0
FW	Alf Quill	2	2
FW	Harold Whitelaw	1	0
FW	Alf White	1	0
FW	Jim Wilkinson	3	2
FW	Max Wynn	2	0

== See also ==
- Soccer in Australia
