= James Cant =

James Cant may refer to:

- James Cant (artist) (1911–1982), Australian painter
- Jim Cant, Scottish footballer
- Jimmy Cant, Australian soccer player
- James Cant Ranch Historic District, in Oregon
