= Peter Vogler =

Australian baseball player and coach

Peter Arnold Vogler (born 10 September 1964 in Ipswich, Queensland) is an Australian baseball coach and former player.

Vogler represented Australia in the 1988 and 1996 Olympic Games.

Vogler's father Brian represented Australia in the 1956 Olympic football competition. Peter played soccer at state league level and represented the Queensland state team.

In 2016 Vogler was inducted into the Australian Baseball Hall of Fame.
