= Frank Parsons (Australian soccer) =

Australian soccer player (1926–2021)

Personal information
- Full name: Frank Parsons
- Date of birth: 18 June 1926
- Date of death: January 2021 (aged 94)
- Position: Forward

Senior career*
Years	Team	Apps	(Gls)
1943-1946	Adamstown	28	(27)
1947–1953	Leichhardt-Annandale	92	(171)
Total		120	(198)

International career
1948-1950	Australia	7	(15)
- * Club domestic league appearances and goals

Frank Parsons (18 June 1926 – January 2021) was an Australian soccer player who played as a striker for the Australia national soccer team. He played his club football for Adamstown and Leichhardt-Annandale.

== Early life ==
Frank Parsons was born on 18 June 1926. He attended Adamstown Public School.

== Club career ==
Parsons began his senior club career with Adamstown before moving to Sydney to play for Leichhardt-Annandale.

In his final year in Australia soccer, Parsons started the 1953 season with a hat-trick against North Shore. Within the first three minutes of the game he went down with an ankle injury and upon receiving further medical after the game at Western Suburbs Hospital, it was discovered he had broken his ankle. He announced his retirement several times, citing scrutiny from referees and politics.

== International career ==
In 1948 he made his debut for Australia in a match against New Zealand. Throughout the duration of his career, Parsons scored 16 goals for Australia including 6 in one game against New Zealand.

== Retirement and death ==
After retiring from football he decided to get in involved in Football administration joining the newly formed NSW Soccer Federation. He was later the principal for Excelsior Public School in Sydney. He was the principal of Shelley Public School Blacktown in 1966.

Parsons died in January 2021, at the age of 94.

== Career statistics ==
=== International ===
Appearances and goals by national team, year and competition
Team	Year	Competitive		Friendly		Total	
Team	Year	Apps	Goals	Apps	Goals	Apps	Goals
Australia	1948	0	0	3	12	3	12
Australia	1950	0	0	4	3	4	3
Career total		0	0	7	15	7	15

Scores and results list Australia's goal tally first, score column indicates score after each Australia goal.

List of international goals scored by Frank Parsons
No.	Date	Venue	Opponent	Score	Result	Competition	Ref.
1	14 August 1948	Basin Reserve, Wellington, New Zealand	New Zealand	–	6–0	Friendly	
2	14 August 1948	Basin Reserve, Wellington, New Zealand	New Zealand	–	6–0	Friendly	
3	14 August 1948	Basin Reserve, Wellington, New Zealand	New Zealand	–	6–0	Friendly	
4	28 August 1948	Lancaster Park, Christchurch, New Zealand	New Zealand	1–0	7–0	Friendly	
5	28 August 1948	Lancaster Park, Christchurch, New Zealand	New Zealand	4–0	7–0	Friendly	
6	28 August 1948	Lancaster Park, Christchurch, New Zealand	New Zealand	5–0	7–0	Friendly	
7	11 September 1948	Blandford Park, Auckland, New Zealand	New Zealand	–	8–1	Friendly	
8	11 September 1948	Blandford Park, Auckland, New Zealand	New Zealand	–	8–1	Friendly	
9	11 September 1948	Blandford Park, Auckland, New Zealand	New Zealand	–	8–1	Friendly	
10	11 September 1948	Blandford Park, Auckland, New Zealand	New Zealand	–	8–1	Friendly	
11	11 September 1948	Blandford Park, Auckland, New Zealand	New Zealand	–	8–1	Friendly	
12	11 September 1948	Blandford Park, Auckland, New Zealand	New Zealand	–	8–1	Friendly	
13	11 June 1950	Salisbury, Southern Rhodesia	Southern Rhodesia	–	5–0	Friendly	
14	8 July 1950	St George's Park, Port Elizabeth, South Africa	South Africa	1–1	2–1	Friendly	
15	8 July 1950	St George's Park, Port Elizabeth, South Africa	South Africa	2–1	2–1	Friendly	

== Honours ==
- NSW State League: 1949, 1950
- NSW State League Cup: 1948, 1949
- NSW Daniels Cup: 1946
- NSW Sydney Cup: 1952

In 1999, Parsons was inducted into the Soccer Australia Hall of Fame (now known as the Football Australia Hall of Fame).
