= Bob Lawrie =

Australian football player (1932–1984)

Personal information
- Date of birth: 1919 or 1920
- Date of death: 11 April 1989

International career
Years	Team	Apps	(Gls)
	Australia	8	(0)

Bob Lawrie (1919/1920 – 11 April 1989) was an Australian football player who played who played for the Socceroos 8 times.

Lawrie died on 11 April 1989.
