= Rudolf Sabetzer =

Austrian footballer

Personal information
- Date of birth: 28 July 1934
- Place of birth: Austria
- Date of death: 25 July 1983 (aged 48)
- Position: Midfielder

Senior career*
Years	Team	Apps	(Gls)
1951–1952	SC Schwechat		
1952–1959	FK Austria Wien	137	(41)
1959–1966	Linzer ASK	172	(62)
1966–1967	SC Wacker Wien	22	(1)
1967–1969	WSG Radenthein		

International career
1956–1965	Austria	3	(2)

Managerial career
- 1982–1983: Floridsdorfer AC
- * Club domestic league appearances and goals

Rudolf Sabetzer (28 July 1934 – 25 July 1983) was an Austrian football midfielder who played for Austria. He also played for SC Schwechat, FK Austria Wien, Linzer ASK and SC Wacker Wien.
