= Tom Jack =

Australian soccer player

Personal information
- Date of birth: 1925/1926
- Date of death: May 1971

Senior career*
Years	Team	Apps	(Gls)
- Third Lanark
1946–1948	Dunfermline Athletic	37	(0)
1948–1951	Brighton		
1952	Box Hill		
1953–?	Melbourne Hakoah		

International career
1950–1955	Australia	11	(0)

Managerial career
- 1951: Brighton
- 1952: Box Hill
- * Club domestic league appearances and goals

Tom Jack was a soccer player who captained the Australian national team during the 1950s.

== Playing career ==
Jack began his professional career in Scotland, playing for Dunfermline Athletic and Third Lanark before emigrating to Australia in 1948.

On arriving in Australia, Jack played for Brighton in the Victoria State League.

He made his debut for Australia against Southern Rhodesia in Salisbury in 1950. He played 11 times for the national team between 1950 and 1955, including two matches as captain.

== Coaching career ==
Jack was a player coach at Brighton and Box Hill.

== Honours ==
Brighton

- Victoria Division One: 1949
- Dockerty Cup runner-up: 1951
- Victoria Night Cup runner-up: 1955

Melbourne Hakoah

- Dockerty Cup: 1953, 1954, 1955, 1956
- Victoria Night Cup runner-up: 1956

Individual

- Football Australia Hall of Fame: 1999
- Football Victoria Hall of Fame: 2011
