= Bill Coolahan =

Australian soccer player

Personal information
- Full name: William Coolahan
- Place of birth: West Wallsend, New South Wales, Australia
- Position: Defender

Senior career*
Years	Team	Apps	(Gls)
1927–1928	West Wallsend		
1930–1931	Adamstown Rosebuds		
1932	Speers Point		
1933–1934	West Wallsend		
1935–1942	Adamstown Rosebuds		
1943	Lake Macquarie		

International career
1938	Australia	3	(1)
- * Club domestic league appearances and goals

William Coolahan was an Australian soccer player. He captained Australia in three matches.

== Club career ==
Born in the footballing hotbed of West Wallsend, New South Wales, Coolahan began his playing career with West Wallsend before crossing to Adamstown Rosebud in 1929. He returned to West Wallsend in 1931 though he only stayed one season before crossing to Speers Point. After another stint with West Wallsend in 1933 and 1934, he moved to Adamstown. At Adamstown he played until the end of the 1942 season. He played his final season of senior football in 1943 for Lake Macquarie.

== International career ==
He played seven matches for the New South Wales state team, playing as captain once. Coolahan represented Australia eight times in B international matches. He played three full international matches and was captain in all three matches. Coolahan made his full debut for Australia in Sydney against India in September 1938. He played two further games against India, the last in October 1938.

== Career statistics ==
=== International ===
National team	Year	Competitive		Friendly		Total	
National team	Year	Apps	Goals	Apps	Goals	Apps	Goals
Australia	1938	0	0	3	1	3	1

List of international goals scored by Bill Coolahan
No.	Date	Venue	Opponent	Score	Result	Competition	Ref.
1	1 October 1938	Melbourne Cricket Ground, Melbourne, Australia	India	–	3–1	Friendly	

== Honours ==
In 2001 Coolahan was inducted in the Australian Soccer Hall of Fame. He is a member of the Hunter Region Sporting Hall of Fame.
