= Malcolm Wild =

Australian soccer player

Personal information
- Full name: Malcolm Wild
- Date of birth: 4 October 1931
- Place of birth: Brisbane, Australia
- Date of death: 10 July 2011 (aged 79)
- Position: Striker

Senior career*
Years	Team	Apps	(Gls)
- Brisbane
- Eastern Suburbs
- Annerley Football Club

International career
1954	Australia	2	(0)
- * Club domestic league appearances and goals

Malcolm Wild (4 October 1931 – 10 July 2011) was an Australian football (soccer) player, who represented Australia in two full international matches. He has since been designated as Socceroo #126.

== Career ==
=== Club and state career ===
Wild debuted in the first grade team for his club Brisbane in 1948. During 1957 he played for Eastern Suburbs F.C. In 1959 Wild was the captain of Annerley Football Club, winning both the premiership and championship in the Brisbane League.

He was selected in 1950 to represent the Queensland state team against New South Wales. Wild made 20 appearances for Queensland between 1950 and 1960.

=== International career ===
Wild made his international debut in a friendly game against New Zealand in Melbourne on 14 August 1954. His other appearance for the national team was on 28 August 1954, also against New Zealand, in Brisbane.
