= Percy Lennard =

Australian soccer player (1900–1975)

Personal information
- Full name: Percy Lennard
- Date of birth: 1900
- Place of birth: Inverell, Australia
- Date of death: 1975 (aged 74–75)
- Place of death: Cessnock, Australia
- Position: Inside forward

Youth career
- 1918: Kurri Kurri

Senior career*
Years	Team	Apps	(Gls)
1919	Rothbury	?	(?)
1920–1937	Cessnock	492	(210)

International career
1923	Australia	3	(2)
- * Club domestic league appearances and goals

Percy Lennard (1900–1975) was an Australian soccer player.

== Early life ==
Lennard was born in Inverell in 1900. As a young child, he moved to Kurri Kurri where he attended a local public school. At the age of 18, despite having shown potential in rugby league.

== Club career ==
=== Rothbury ===
Lennard played for the Kurri Kurri under-18 team as captain in 1918 before starting his senior team at Rothbury in 1919.

=== Cessnock ===
After one year with Rothbury, Lennard joined Cessnock where he spent the rest of his career at. He helped the club to honours that included the Stevenson, Kerr and Ellis Cups, and in 1928 and 1929 the State League Premiership Cup. In his Cessnock career, he played 492 senior games and scored 210 goals for Cessnock.

== International and state career ==
Lennard represented Australia twelve times, scoring twice. He made his Australian debut against New Zealand in 1923 where he scored Australia's first ever international goal on home soil. Lennard was inducted into the City of Cessnock Hall of Fame on 6 December 2006, he was also inducted in the Hunter Region Sporting Hall of Fame.

Lennard represented New South Wales interstate and internationally, and in 1923, was selected to play for Australia in three exhibition matches against New Zealand, and scored two goals. These matches were the first played in Australia by an international football team, and the first full A Grade international football matches played in the country. Given that he scored the first goal in the first match of the series, Lennard scored the first ever Australian international football goal on home soil. He played for Australia in nine further internationals.

Lennard's son Jack Lennard also represented Australia in international football.

== Career statistics ==
=== International ===
National team	Year	Competitive		Friendly		Total	
National team	Year	Apps	Goals	Apps	Goals	Apps	Goals
Australia	1923	0	0	3	2	3	2

Scores and results list Australia's goal tally first, score column indicates score after each Australia goal.

List of international goals scored by Percy Lennard
No.	Date	Venue	Opponent	Score	Result	Competition	Ref.
1	9 June 1923	Brisbane Cricket Ground, Brisbane, Australia	New Zealand	1–0	2–1	Friendly	
2	16 June 1923	Sydney Cricket Ground, Sydney, Australia	New Zealand	1–1	2–3	Friendly	

== Death ==
Lennard died in Cessnock in 1975, aged 74.
