= William Dane =

Australian soccer player

Personal information
- Full name: William Dane
- Place of birth: Australia
- Position: Forward

Youth career
- 1910-1914: Holroyd United

Senior career*
Years	Team	Apps	(Gls)
1915–1923	Granville Magpies		

International career
1922	Australia	2	(0)
- * Club domestic league appearances and goals

William Dane was a former Australian professional soccer player who played as a half-back for Australian clubs and the Australia national soccer team. He played in the first Australian National team that toured New Zealand in 1922.

== Club career ==
Dane played for the NSW club Granville Magpies from 1915, less the three years he served in WWI, which included him awarded as top goalscorer in 1920 and won a Premiership title in 1923.

== International career ==
Dane played two international matches with Australia in 1922.

== Career statistics ==
=== International ===
National team	Year	Competitive		Friendly		Total	
National team	Year	Apps	Goals	Apps	Goals	Apps	Goals
Australia	1922	0	0	2	0	2	0
Career total		0	0	2	0	2	0
