= John Doyle (soccer, born 1946) =

Irish Australian soccer player and coach (born 1946)

Personal information
- Date of birth: 17 January 1946 (age 80)
- Place of birth: Ireland
- Position: Forward

Senior career*
Years	Team	Apps	(Gls)
1969–1972	South Sydney Croatia		
1973	Pan Hellenic		
1974–1975	South Sydney Croatia		
1976–1978	APIA Leichhardt		
1979	Canterbury-Marrickville Olympic		

International career
1970	Australia	1	(0)

Managerial career
- 1988–1989: Australia (women)
- 1997: Sydney United
- 2004–2005: Sydney Olympic
- * Club domestic league appearances and goals

John Doyle (born 17 January 1946) is a soccer coach and former player who was a forward. He won a single cap for the Australia men's national association football team in 1970 and coached the Australia women's national association football team during 1988.

== Career ==
Born in Ireland, Doyle played club football for various teams in the Sydney area. He made one official international appearance for Australia's male team, as a substitute in a 1–0 friendly win over Israel on 10 November 1970. The match was part of a world tour under new coach Rale Rasic. On the tour Doyle took part in a further six matches, scoring two goals, in games which were not considered full international fixtures.

Doyle was put in charge of Australia's women's team two months before their appearance at the 1988 FIFA Women's Invitation Tournament (a pilot World Cup) in China. He resigned after the team performed poorly at the 1989 OFC Women's Championship.

In addition to his soccer career, Doyle worked as a high school maths teacher.
