= Eric Hulme =

English footballer (born 1949)

Personal information
- Full name: Eric Martin Hulme
- Date of birth: 14 January 1949 (age 77)
- Place of birth: Houghton-le-Spring, County Durham, England
- Position: Goalkeeper

Senior career*
Years	Team	Apps	(Gls)
19??–1970	Spennymoor United		
1970–1972	Nottingham Forest	5	(0)
1972	→ Lincoln City (loan)		
1972–1974	Lincoln City (Note: Hulme made 23 league appearances in total for Lincoln. The cited source does not distinguish between appearances made during the initial loan and the permanent spell.)	23	(0)
1974	→ Gainsborough Trinity (loan)		
1974–19??	Worksop Town		
- * Club domestic league appearances and goals

Eric Martin Hulme (born 14 January 1949) is an English former footballer who made 28 appearances in the Football League playing for Nottingham Forest and Lincoln City as a goalkeeper.

Hulme joined Nottingham Forest from non-league club Spennymoor United in March 1970. He made his Forest debut 18 months later, after an injury to regular goalkeeper Jim Barron in a League Cup tie against Chelsea, making several good saves before Chelsea finally scored after 63 minutes. The Daily Express's Steve Curry wrote that "Hulme tried, often with brilliance, sometimes with luck, to preserve Forest's lead. He made saves from Peter Osgood and Tommy Baldwin of a quality one hardly expects from a reserve." He played five times more for the first team before joining Lincoln City of the Fourth Division, initially on loan, in late 1972. He stayed at Lincoln for two seasons, including a loan spell in non-league football with Gainsborough Trinity, and then joined Worksop Town.

He later became a cook.

== Notes ==
He was a cook at Sherburn Hospital, Durham.
