= Jack Hughes (soccer) =

Australian soccer player

Personal information
- Full name: Jack Hughes
- Place of birth: Wallsend, New South Wales, Australia
- Position: Striker

Youth career
- –1928: West Wallsend Bluebells

Senior career*
Years	Team	Apps	(Gls)
1931–1934	West Wallsend	53	(54)
1935–1943	Metters	143	(197)
Total		196	(251)

International career
	Australia	11	(11)
- * Club domestic league appearances and goals

Jack Hughes was an Australian forward during the 1930s. He was a prominent figure in the infamous Metters, side that dominated NSW Football for a whole decade. He was inducted to the Football Australian Hall of Fame in 2004.

== Club career ==
Hughes started his club career at West Wallsend after progressing throughout West Wallsend’s youth ranks. He stayed at West Wallsend for 4 years before moving to Metters.

Over the course of 9 years at Metters, Jack Hughes scored 237 goals in 176 games, teaming up with his brother Ron Hughes. These two were the most feared strikers in NSW Football in the late 30s and early 40s. On 6 September 1941, Jack and Ron both scored 5 goals as Metters beat Gladesville 12-1 in a NSW State League match. Between them, they scored 597 goals in NSW competitions.

== International career ==
Jack Hughes played for Australia in a time where Australia were producing so many attacking talents. These talents included Alf Quill, George Smith and Alec Cameron, so had limited chances to make appearances for Australia test matches. Despite this, he still managed to play against England, India and Palestine over the course of 2 years.

== Career statistics ==
Appearances and goals by club, season, and competition. Only official games are included in this table.
Club	Season	League		State League Cup		Sheahan Cup		Other		Total	
Club	Season	Apps	Goals	Apps	Goals	Apps	Goals	Apps	Goals	Apps	Goals
West Wallsend	1931	7	4	2	3	0	0	0	0	9	7
West Wallsend	1932	13	12	3	2	0	0	0	0	16	14
West Wallsend	1933	9	14	1	0	0	0	0	0	10	14
West Wallsend	1934	25	23	4	4	0	0	1	2	30	29
Metters	1935	20	27	4	3	2	2	0	0	26	32
Metters	1936	17	26	4	9	1	0	0	0	22	35
Metters	1937	17	29	4	4	1	1	0	0	22	34
Metters	1938	22	32	4	7	1	0	0	0	27	39
Metters	1939	18	23	1	0	2	4	0	0	21	27
Metters	1940	21	26	3	3	2	2	1	4	27	35
Metters	1941	15	19	2	2	1	0	0	0	18	21
Metters	1942	11	10	2	0	0	0	1	0	14	10
Metters	1943	2	5	0	0	0	0	0	0	2	5
Metters	Total	196	251	32	37	10	7	3	6	241	301
