= Tim Cooper (footballer) =

New Zealand footballer

Personal information
- Full name: M B Cooper
- Place of birth: New Zealand
- Position: Right-back

Senior career*
Years	Team	Apps	(Gls)
- Eastern Suburbs

International career
1951–1954	New Zealand	8	(0)
- * Club domestic league appearances and goals

Tim Cooper was an association football player who represented New Zealand at international level.

Cooper made his full All Whites debut in a 6–4 win over New Caledonia on 22 September 1952 and ended his international playing career with eight A-international caps to his credit, his final cap an appearance in a 1–4 loss to Australia on 4 September 1954.
