= Fat Kitching =

Australian soccer player

Personal information
- Full name: George Redvers Kitching
- Position: Forward

Senior career*
Years	Team	Apps	(Gls)
1937	Bundamba Rangers		
1938–1940	Blackstone		
1941–1948	Bundamba Rangers		
1949–1950	Blackstone		

International career
1938	Australia	1	(1)

Managerial career
- 1951: Bundamba Rangers
- * Club domestic league appearances and goals

George "Fat" Kitching (29 August 1912 – 11 July 1979) was an Australian soccer player.

Kitching played one match for Australia in 1938 against India in Brisbane. His granddaughter, Belinda Kitching was also an Australian international soccer player.

== Career statistics ==
=== International ===
National team	Year	Competitive		Friendly		Total	
National team	Year	Apps	Goals	Apps	Goals	Apps	Goals
Australia	1938	0	0	1	1	1	1

List of international goals scored by Fat Kitching
No.	Date	Venue	Opponent	Score	Result	Competition	Ref.
1	3 September 1938	Brisbane Exhibition Ground, Brisbane, Australia	India	–	4–4	Friendly	
