= Colin Kitching =

Australian soccer player

Personal information
- Full name: Colin Kitching
- Date of birth: 11 November 1933
- Date of death: 12 March 2022 (aged 88)
- Position: Forward

International career^{‡}
Years	Team	Apps	(Gls)
1955–1956	Australia	3	(0)
- ‡ National team caps and goals as of 8 June 2016

Colin Kitching (19 November 1933 – 12 March 2022) was an Australian football player.

Kitching played club football in Queensland, firstly in Ipswich at Bundamba, Blackstone United, and St Helens United before moving to Brisbane when he joined Hellenic. He won Queensland premierships 5 times: in 1953 with Blackstone United, in 1955 and 1957 with Bundamba, and in 1960 and 1963 with Hellenic. Kitching died in March 2022.

Kitching was a member of the Australian team at the 1956 Summer Olympics.
