= Tibor Szalay =

Hungarian footballer (born 1938)

Personal information
- Full name: Tibor Szalay Csikos
- Date of birth: 26 January 1938 (age 88)
- Place of birth: Gbelce, Czechoslovakia
- Height: 5 ft 7 in (1.70 m)
- Position: Midfielder

Youth career
- –1956: MTK

Senior career*
Years	Team	Apps	(Gls)
1956–1958	Austria Wien	46	
1958–1961	Sevilla	71	(25)
1961–1963	Barcelona	2	(1)
1963	New York Hungaria		
1963–1964	Real Murcia	12	(1)
1965	New York Hungaria		
1965–1966	Beşiktaş	3	(0)
1967	Philadelphia Spartans	23	(8)
1968	Houston Stars	21	(7)
1970	Kansas City Spurs	24	(6)
1970	Philadelphia Ukrainians		
1971	Washington Darts	22	(4)
1971	New York Hungaria		
Total		224	(52)
- * Club domestic league appearances and goals

Tibor Szalay Csikos (born 26 January 1938) is a Hungarian former football player.

== Career statistics ==
=== Club ===
Club	Season	League			Cup		Other		Total	
Club	Season	Division	Apps	Goals	Apps	Goals	Apps	Goals	Apps	Goals
Sevilla	1958–59	La Liga	25	3	0	0	0	0	20	5
Sevilla	1959–60	La Liga	24	14	1 (Note: Appearances in the Copa del Generalísimo)	0	0	0	25	14
Sevilla	1960–61	La Liga	22	8	5	2	0	0	27	10
Sevilla	Total		71	25	6	2	0	0	77	27
Barcelona	1961–62	La Liga	2	1	4	2	0	0	6	3
Barcelona	1962–63	La Liga	0	0	0	0	0	0	0	0
Barcelona	Total		2	1	4	2	0	0	6	3
Real Murcia	1963–64	La Liga	12	1	1	0	0	0	13	1
Beşiktaş	1965–66	1.Lig	3	0	0	0	0	0	3	0
Philadelphia Spartans	1967	NPSL	23	8	0	0	0	0	23	8
Houston Stars	1968	NASL	21	7	0	0	0	0	21	7
Kansas City Spurs	1970	NASL	24	6	0	0	0	0	24	6
Washington Darts	1971	NASL	22	4	0	0	0	0	22	4
Career total			178	52	11	4	0	0	235	56
