= Tom Thompson (Australian soccer) =

Australian soccer player

Personal information
- Full name: Thomas Thompson
- Place of birth: Wollongong, Australia
- Position: Forward

Senior career*
Years	Team	Apps	(Gls)
1921–1933	Balgownie		
1934–1935	Granville		
1936–1937	Wollongong Steelworks		

International career
1922–1924	Australia	8	(0)
- * Club domestic league appearances and goals

Tom Thompson was a former Australian professional soccer player who played as a forward for NSW clubs and the Australia national soccer team.

== Club career ==
Thompson played out his club career at hometown Balgownie, Granville and Wollongong Steelworks.

== International career ==
Thompson began his international career with Australia in 1922 on their first historic tour against New Zealand, debuting in a 1–3 defeat to New Zealand. He played two matches in 1922, three matches in 1923 and another three matches against Canada in 1924.

== Career statistics ==
=== International ===
National team	Year	Competitive		Friendly		Total	
National team	Year	Apps	Goals	Apps	Goals	Apps	Goals
Australia	1922	0	0	2	0	2	0
Australia	1923	0	0	3	0	3	0
Australia	1924	0	0	3	0	3	0
Total		0	0	8	0	8	0
