= Brian Vogler =

Australian soccer player and coal miner

Brian "Chookie" Vogler (30 May 1932 in Ipswich, Queensland – 6 May 2009 in Gold Coast, Queensland) was an Australian international footballer and coal miner.

== Biography ==
He spent his childhood in North Ipswich attending local Catholic schools before becoming a coal miner, a profession he followed for 43 years.

Vogler began his sporting career as a professional rugby league footballer before switching to football. He played senior football in Queensland for Blackstone and Hellenic during the 1950s and 1960s. Later he would be a competitive cricketer and lawn bowler.

Although selected in the Australian squad that competed at the 1956 Melbourne Olympic Games, Brian didn't make his international debut until after the Games in a friendly match against India at the Sydney Sports Ground in December of the same year.

Vogler, Socceroo number 158, scored on debut in a 1–7 loss to the Indians. He played two more matches for Australia against New Zealand in 1958 scoring his second A-international goal at Carlaw Park in a 2-all draw. In 1959 he scored again for Australia in a B-International against a touring Heart of Midlothian team. In later life he was a competitive lawn bowler.

== Personal life ==
Married to Margaret. They had six children: Mark, Gary, Christine, Peter (an Australian representative in baseball at two Olympics), Matthew and Anne.
