= Cliff Sander =

Australian soccer player (1931–2022)

Personal information
- Full name: William Clifford Sander
- Date of birth: 4 November 1931
- Place of birth: Ipswich, Queensland
- Date of death: 8 February 2022 (aged 90)
- Position: Midfielder

Senior career*
Years	Team	Apps	(Gls)
1948–1958	St Helens		
1958–?	Brisbane Azzurri		

International career
- Australia
- * Club domestic league appearances and goals

William Clifford Sander (4 November 1931 – 8 February 2022), known as Cliff Sander, was an Australian soccer player who played as a midfielder.

== Club career ==
Sander played for the Ipswich Tech before moving to St Helens in 1948. He won the Queensland championship with St Helens at the age of 17 and the premiership in 1956. In 1958 he signed with Brisbane Azzurri. With Brisbane Azzurri, he won the premiership in 1961.

== International career ==
Sander made his Australia national team debut in 1950 against New Caledonia. He went on to play 21 times for the Socceroos. Eight of those matches were 'A' internationals. Sander represented Australia at the 1956 Summer Olympics.

== Personal life ==
Sander died on 8 February 2022, at the age of 90.
