= Steve Herczeg =

Australian footballer

Personal information
- Date of birth: 24 July 1944
- Place of birth: Kecskemét, Hungary
- Date of death: 19 September 2016 (aged 72)
- Place of death: Woodville South, South Australia, Australia
- Position: Midfielder

Youth career
- Orange-Sturt

Senior career*
Years	Team	Apps	(Gls)
1960–1963	Adelaide Budapest		
1963–1964	Adelaide Croatia		
1964–1975	Adelaide Juventus		
1976	Adelaide Polonia		
- Port Adelaide
- Croydon Park

International career
1965	Australia	2	(0)
- * Club domestic league appearances and goals

Stephen Herczeg (24 July 1944 – 19 September 2016) was a footballer who played as a winger and represented the Australia national soccer team in 1965. Born in Hungary, he went to Australia as a child refugee and grew up in Adelaide, where he played for a number of local clubs, including Adelaide Juventus, who paid an Australian record transfer fee for him. He was the first player from South Australia to represent the national team.

== Early life ==
Born in Kecskemét, Hungary, on 24 July 1944, Herczeg was one of four children. His family fled the Soviet-occupied country in 1949, when he was five years old, and were amongst 20,000 displaced Hungarians who eventually went to Australia as refugees. After a spell at a migrant hostel in Woodside, South Australia, the family settled in Croydon Park, a suburb of Adelaide. Inspired by the success of his homeland's "Golden Team" during the 1950s, Herczeg preferred to play "real football" rather than take up the Australian rules version.

== Club career ==
After playing for Orange-Sturt at junior level, Herczeg made his debut in senior soccer for Adelaide Budapest in 1960, aged 16. He spent a single season with Adelaide Croatia in 1963 before joining Adelaide Juventus for a then Australian record transfer fee of £1,500. He later played for Adelaide Polonia and Port Adelaide. He ended his career with Croydon Park in amateur football, retiring in 1981. He later coached youth teams at Polonia, including his son Josh.

== International career ==
Herczeg was called up to represent Australia in November 1965, for the 1966 World Cup qualifying matches against North Korea. As a part-time footballer, he had to arrange time off from his job with TNT to travel to the matches, which were played in Phnom Penh, Cambodia. He made his international debut in the second match against North Korea, a 3–1 defeat, becoming the first player from South Australia to represent the national team. Australia subsequently toured South East Asia and Herczeg made his second and final international appearance as a substitute in a friendly match against Taiwan. The match, played in Hong Kong, was a "spiteful and bruising encounter" that ended with Australia leaving the field under police escort while being pelted with bottles.

In addition to his international career, Herczeg made fifteen appearances for South Australia in representative matches, scoring six goals.

== Playing style ==
Herczeg was a quick player with a powerful left-foot shot who played either as a winger or a striker. Former teammate John Kundereri Moriarty described him as "a great team man" and "an excellent tactician", and praised his accuracy as a free kick taker.

== Personal life ==
Outside of his part-time football career, Herczeg worked as a long-haul truck driver for TNT and later as a driver and forklift operator for Coopers Brewery and import firm Stonecraft. He was married to his first wife Margaret, a state-level ice skater, from 1965 to 1972 and had one son with her, Steve junior. He married his second wife Kristine, who was of Polish descent, in 1979 and had two more sons, Chris and Josh. Kristine died in 2015. Herczeg continued to speak fluent Hungarian but never returned to visit his birth country.

== Death ==
Herczeg was admitted to The Queen Elizabeth Hospital in Adelaide on 19 September 2016 after a fall, and suffering from hallucinations and with a urinary tract infection. His condition was uncomplicated, but after his catheter tube was wrongly connected to an oxygen supply he died later that day in what the State Coroner described as "awful and macabre circumstances... his body filled much like a balloon". The death was ruled as "entirely preventable", with the coroner highly critical of the standard of medical care but unable to establish who was responsible for interfering with the equipment.
