= Liu Lifu =

Chinese footballer

Liu Lifu 刘利福
Personal information
- Full name: Liu Lifu
- Date of birth: 1 October 1955 (age 71)
- Place of birth: Beijing, China
- Position: Midfielder

Senior career*
Years	Team	Apps	(Gls)
- Beijing
1985–1986	Tung Sing		
- Beijing Army

International career
1977–1982	China	12	(2)
Medal record
Men's football
Representing China
Asian Games
Bronze medal – third place	1978 Bangkok	Football
- * Club domestic league appearances and goals

Liu Lifu (simplified Chinese: 刘利福; traditional Chinese: 劉利福; pinyin: Liú Lìfú; born 1 October 1955) is a former Chinese footballer.

== Club career ==
Born in Beijing, Liu played for hometown team Beijing. In 1982, Beijing won the China National League, with 50% of Beijing's goals being assisted by Liu. In 1985, Liu joined Hong Kong First Division League club Tung Sing, before leaving in 1986 after the Hong Kong Football Association implemented player registration restrictions for non-Hongkongers. Following his spell with Tung Sing, Liu joined the Beijing Army team for a season, before retiring.

== International career ==
On 6 October 1977, Liu made his debut for China in a 1–1 draw against the United States in China's first tour to the Western Bloc, following opening the scoring in a 1–1 draw against the New York Cosmos on 17 September 1977, in the Cosmos' tour of China.

=== International goals ===
Scores and results list China's goal tally first.

#	Date	Venue	Opponent	Score	Result	Competition
1	18 December 1978	Supachalasai Stadium, Bangkok, Thailand	Thailand	1–0	4–1	1978 Asian Games
2	25 December 1978	Rizal Memorial Stadium, Manila, Philippines	Philippines	3–0	3–0	1980 AFC Asian Cup qualification
