= Jack Evans (soccer) =

Jack 'Digger' Evans
Personal information
- Positions: Full-back; Aberdare; Cessnock; Metters; Goodyear; Annandale-Leichhardt

International career
Years	Team	Apps	(Gls)
1933–1941	Australia	40	((11 'A' internationals))

Jack 'Digger' Evans was an Australian soccer player who played as a full-back during the 1930s and 1940s. He represented the Australia national team, making 40 total appearances.

== Club career ==
Evans played club football extensively within New South Wales regional and state competitions. He featured for club sides in Aberdare and Cessnock, as well as prominent Sydney-based state league teams including Metters, Goodyear, Annandale-Leichhardt and Lake Macquarie.

== International career ==
Evans represented the Australia national team across an international career from 1933 to 1941. Over his career, he accumulated 40 appearances for his country, with 11 categorised as 'A' international fixtures. He also captained the national side during his playing tenure.

== Recognition ==
In recognition of his contributions to the sport in Australia, Evans was inducted into the Football Australia Hall of Fame as part of the Class of 1999.
