= Jack Lennard =

Australian soccer player

Jack Warner Lennard
Personal information
- Full name: Jack Lennard
- Date of birth: 2 April 1930
- Place of birth: Warners Bay NSW
- Date of death: 22 July 2003 (aged 73)
- Position: Forward

Senior career*
Years	Team	Apps	(Gls)
- Cessnock
- Mayfield

International career^{‡}
	Australia	16	(2)

Managerial career
- Cessnock Police Boys
- Cessnock
- * Club domestic league appearances and goals as of 10 May 2009 ‡ National team caps and goals as of 10 May 2009

Jack Lennard (2 April 1930 – 22 July 2003) was an Australian football (soccer) player.

Jack Lennard began his first grade career with Cessnock in 1947, when he was 17 years old. From 1948 to 1955, he played with Lysaghts Orb (Mayfield United) and rejoined Cessnock City Club in 1956. He played there until his retirement in 1964. He played 410 first grade games for Cessnock City club. Lennard represented Australia 16 times. He made his Australian debut against China in 1953. Jack's father Percy Lennard also represented Australia and when Jack Lennard was selected to play against China they became the first New South Wales father and son to represent Australia in football. Jack Lennard played in international matches against England, New Zealand, Austria, Hungary and South Africa, as well as against the touring club side Heart of Midlothian. The highlight of his international career was at the 1956 Melbourne Olympics, playing in matches against Japan and India. Jack Lennard was voted Australian Player of the Series.
