= Bruce Morrow (soccer) =

Australian soccer player

Personal information
- Full name: Bruce Morrow
- Date of birth: 5 May 1936 (age 90)
- Position: Winger

Senior career*
Years	Team	Apps	(Gls)
- Wallsend FC
- Auburn
- A.P.I.A.
- Wallsend FC
- Newcastle Australs
- Hamilton Olympic FC

International career
1956–1967	Australia	5	(2)
- * Club domestic league appearances and goals

Bruce Morrow (born 5 May 1936) is an Australian former footballer who played as a winger.

During his playing time in New South Wales, Morrow scored more than 368 goals in league and cup competitions. He represented Australia at the 1956 Summer Olympics. He scored twice in their second match, a 4–2 loss to India.

Morrow was inducted into the Football Federation Australia Hall of Fame in 2005, alongside Robbie Slater and Craig Johnston.
