= Jim Armstrong (soccer) =

Scottish-Australian association footballer

Jimmy Armstrong
Personal information
- Full name: James Armstrong
- Date of birth: 21 March 1943
- Place of birth: Scotland
- Date of death: 19 August 2024 (aged 81)
- Place of death: Australia
- Position: Forward

Senior career*
Years	Team	Apps	(Gls)
1966–	Hakoah		
1970–1976	South Melbourne Hellas		
- Brunswick Juventus
- Shepparton United
- Morwell Falcons
- Sandringham City
Total			(152)

International career
	Australia	4	(2)
- * Club domestic league appearances and goals

James Armstrong (21 March 1943 – 19 August 2024) was a Scottish-born Australian professional footballer who played as a forward. He represented the Australia national team four times, scoring two goals.

Armstrong was a highly prolific scorer in the Victorian top flight, amassing 152 league goals. He is an inaugural inductee of the Football Australia Hall of Fame and a Life Member of Football Victoria.

== Playing career ==
=== Club career ===
Born in Scotland, Armstrong emigrated to Australia in 1966, initially joining Hakoah. He moved to South Melbourne Hellas in 1970, where he enjoyed his most successful club stint. During his seven seasons with South Melbourne, he won three Victorian State League championships and was awarded the prestigious Bill Fleming Medal in 1974. Armstrong was later honoured with selection in South Melbourne's Team of the Century.

He went on to play for Brunswick Juventus, Shepparton United, Morwell Falcons and Sandringham City.

=== International career ===
Armstrong represented Australia in four full international matches, scoring two goals. He also represented the Victorian state team in 10 representative fixtures.

== Post-playing career ==
Following his retirement from playing, Armstrong transitioned into coaching and football administration. He served as the manager for both Brunswick Juventus and South Melbourne, and additionally managed Westvale Olympic.

Off the pitch, he contributed significantly as a board member and secretary for South Melbourne, and sat on various committees for the Victorian Soccer Federation.

== Honours ==
=== Club ===
South Melbourne Hellas

- Victorian State League: 1972, 1974, 1976

=== Individual ===
- Bill Fleming Medal: 1974
- South Melbourne Team of the Century
- Football Australia Hall of Fame: 1999 (Inaugural Inductee)
- Football Victoria Hall of Fame
- Football Victoria Life Membership: 2015
