= Allan Johns =

Australian soccer player (1925–2012)

Personal information
- Date of birth: 13 June 1925
- Date of death: 25 June 2012 (aged 87)

Senior career*
| Years | Team | Apps | (Gls) |
| 1943–1959 | Adamstown Rosebud | 310 | |

International career
| 1948–1950 | Australia | 10 | (6) |
- * Club domestic league appearances and goals

Allan Johns (13 June 1925 – 25 June 2012) was an Australian soccer player who played for Adamstown Rosebud. Johns played 10 full international matches for Australia.

== Club career ==
Johns began playing at high school, before joining Adamstown Rosebud, the club where his father Harold had played with in the 1920s. After playing junior football with Rosebud, he made his senior debut for the club in 1943.

In 1954, a testimonial match was played in Johns' honour and several players travelled from Brisbane and Sydney to attend.

He retired from playing 1959, having played over 300 times for Rosebud.

== International career ==
Having already represented the state of New South Wales in 1946, Johns was selected for Australia's 1948 tour of New Zealand, where he made his national team debut in a 6–0 defeat of the local team in Wellington.

== Post-playing career ==
Johns served as president of Adamstown Rosebud in 1963 and 1964.

== Later life and legacy ==
Johns received a number of honours in his later life. He was in the inaugural intake of the Australian Soccer Hall of Fame (later renamed the Football Australia Hall of Fame) in 1999. In 2002, the new grandstand at Adamstown Oval was named in his honour.

Johns died on 25 June 2012, aged 87.
