= Geoff Sleight =

English-born Australian soccer player

Personal information
- Full name: Geoffrey Sleight
- Date of birth: 20 June 1943 (age 83)
- Place of birth: Barnsley, England
- Position: Winger

Senior career*
Years	Team	Apps	(Gls)
1961–1962	Bolton Wanderers	2	(0)
1963–1964	Wigan Athletic	16	(4)
1965	Prague Sydney		
1967	Macclesfield Town	1	(0)
- Stalybridge Celtic
- Buxton
1974–1977	Mossley		
1977–1978	Droylsden		
1978–1979	Mossley		
- Frickley Athletic

International career
1965	Australia	2	(0)

Managerial career
- 1976: Mossley
- Frickley Athletic (player-manager)
- Goole Town
- * Club domestic league appearances and goals

Geoffrey "Geoff" Sleight (born 20 June 1943 in Barnsley, England) is an Australian former footballer who played as a winger.

He joined Bolton Wanderers after leaving school, and made his debut against Manchester City in September 1961. Sleight made just two appearances for the first-team before being released. He went on to play for Wigan Athletic, Buxton and Mossley, where he briefly acted as caretaker manager in November and December 1976, winning four of his five matches in charge. After Howard Wilkinson was appointed as permanent manager, he left to join Droylsden, before returning to Mossley in 1978. He soon moved onto become player-manager at Frickley Athletic, and guided the team to promotion to the Football Conference in 1980. After retiring, Sleight later became chief scout for Howard Wilkinson at Leeds United between 1993 and 1996.

Sleight also represented the Australia national team on two occasions, including an appearance in their first ever World Cup qualifying game against North Korea. North Korea won the match 6–1.
