= Charlie Stewart (soccer, born 1928) =

Australian soccer player

Personal information
- Date of birth: 1928 (age 97–98)
- Position: Winger

Senior career*
| Years | Team | Apps | (Gls) |
| 1943–1959 | Woonona-Bulli | 393 | (234) |

International career
| 1947–1955 | Australia | 5 | (3) |
- * Club domestic league appearances and goals

Charlie Stewart (born 1928) is an Australian association football player who played as a winger during the 1940s and 1950s.

== Club career ==
Stewart played club football for Woonona-Bulli in the New South Wales State League.

== International career ==
Stewart played five times between 1947 and 1955 for Australia, scoring three goals.

== Honours ==
In 2006 Stewart was inducted into the Football Federation Australia Football Hall of Fame.
