= Graham McMillan =

Australian soccer player

Personal information
- Date of birth: 21 January 1936 (age 90)
- Place of birth: Brisbane, Queensland, Australia
- Positions: Left wing; inside forward

Senior career*
| Years | Team | Apps | (Gls) |
- YMCA
- Leyton Orient F.C
- Annerley
- Hellenic

International career^{‡}
- Australia
- * Club domestic league appearances and goals as of 11 May 2009 ‡ National team caps and goals as of 11 May 2009

Graham McMillan (born 21 January 1936 in Brisbane, Queensland) is an Australian former football (soccer) player.

Graham McMillan represented Australia at the 1956 Summer Olympics. Graham McMillan scored Australia's first goal in its 1956 Olympic campaign.

Graham McMillan was awarded the "Award of Distinction" when he was inducted in 1999 into the Football Hall of Fame (Australia) which is organised by Football Federation Australia.

== Early years ==
Graham McMillan was the second son of Alexander and Evelyn McMillan. His father was born in Glasgow, Scotland and came to Australia in 1913. His father was a talented football (soccer) player and represented the State of Queensland in the 1920s. His mother was a good sprinter and was a member of the local "Mayne Harriers Athletics Club".

Graham McMillan had a sister, Patricia, who died at the age of 3 prior to his birth, and an older brother, Alexander (who went by the name "Lex"). Graham McMillan's early education was at the local Junction Park State Primary School in Annerley, where he represented in inter-school competition at both football (soccer) and Cricket. Graham McMillan attended Industrial High in his secondary years, which fielded a football (soccer) team in the local club competition. As a Sub-Junior Graham McMillan was selected in the football (soccer) Senior School team and also represented the school at Cricket in the 1st Eleven team.

== Formative years ==
Graham McMillan's father fostered both his brothers' and his interest and love for both football (soccer) and Cricket by taking them regularly to both club and interstate events. On the football (soccer) side of things, as mentioned, his father had been an accomplished player and was considered a master of the dribble. Graham McMillan's father taught his brother and him the art of keeping the ball from opponents. The family would also practice heading with a tennis ball to learn perfect timing which allowed them to send the ball a great distance. Graham McMillan honed his heading and timing skills by using a tennis ball tied to a clothes line. Lowering the line also helped time his feet volleying skills of a moving ball. Graham McMillan's practice paid off as he is readily remembered for his hang time and ability to out-leap much taller opponents, despite his relatively small stature.

== Football career ==
At the age of 17 Graham McMillan teamed up with his brother Lex and they played for YMCA in the "A" Division, the top division in the Brisbane / Ipswich football (soccer) competition. Whilst still a teenager Graham McMillan represented Brisbane against Ipswich in an annual competition for the Kruger Cup, an event played in a home and away format and which was always a hard-fought encounter. The Ipswich players were mostly hardened coal miners and played a tough, physical game. These matches were a great education and friendships Graham McMillan gained with some of the Ipswich players endure to this very day.

In 1955 Graham McMillan was selected as a standby player for the Queensland State Team and secured his place in the 1956 Queensland team the following year. In the 1956 selection match of Probables versus Possibles, Graham McMillan scored a record eight individual goals in the eleven to three victory by the Probables. From ensuing matches against the State sides of New South Wales and Victoria, Graham McMillan was selected in a combination "Eastern States Team" to play against the other States – South Australia in Adelaide, Western Australia in Perth and Tasmania in Hobart. Prior to the Western Australia match their local newspaper stated that Graham McMillan was rated as the best inside forward found in Australia for many years. Thankfully he had a good game, with the Perth press stating, "Grahame McMillan received applause for this fine approach work, and local critics unanimously claimed him as the best man on the field." The matches against the other States on that trip were just as successful for Graham McMillan and in October 1956, he was advised that he had been selected to represent Australia at the 1956 Summer Olympics.

In 1957, a Hungarian side, Ferencvárosi Torna Club, visited with coach Professor Árpád Csanádi, who was also mentor of the Hungarian National Team. Professor Csanádi was most impressed by Graham McMillan's performance and proclaimed McMillan as the best player he had seen in Australia. The report of the match when they played Queensland stated that Graham McMillan's pace and clever ball control caused the Hungarians to make substitutions to strengthen their defence. Professor Csanádi told Graham McMillan that he would like to take him to play in Europe. Graham McMillan considered the request but felt it was not a suitable move at the time with Hungary recovering from political unrest. Nevertheless, Professor Csanádi said he would recommend McMillan to any team over there.

The upshot was that Graham McMillan received an invitation from London Club Leyton Orient to go over and join them. Graham McMillan arrived in London on 17 October 1957. The club set him up in ‘digs’ not far from the Orient's ground, which was located, ironically, in Brisbane Road. In those days the remuneration was not great and players at the end of their careers were shown the door and had to seek other employment. This situation was brought home to McMillan one Sunday when he was at the ground having a bit of a kick around. McMillan got chatting to a bloke who was sweeping out the stands and it turned out he had been a player of some note and had been captain of the team. When he retired the club had kept him on as a cleaner.

Graham McMillan injured his left knee in the New Year. The treatment afforded to him by the club was a bit of a rub and a reassuring, "you’re ok" by an unqualified ‘trainer’ in the club's Medical Room in which the facilities were way short of state-of-the-art. McMillan kept playing though the knee failed to respond to ‘treatment’. In the end McMillan decided that he had had enough, the knee was not improving. The Club asked him to reconsider, but with no offer of treatment by a qualified expert he could not see any chance of improvement in his condition. A further offer to reconsider came from Eddie Baily, a former Nottingham Forest and England international footballer who was transferring back to Leyton Orient. Eddie and McMillan would have a ‘cuppa’ at the Tea Shop in the High Street after training. But McMillan's mind was made up and he flew back to Brisbane in 1958.

Despite his injured knee, Graham McMillan continued to be selected for both State and Australian soccer teams.

In 1959, Graham McMillan and his brother Lex joined a new football club, Annerley. This club had just been promoted to the 1st Division and consisted of a number of young players having their first experience at that level. A very good friend of Graham McMillan's, Bill Barron, who had worked with McMillan as a trainer for many years joined Annerley as coach. Barron boasted very little soccer experience but was a great thinker and innovator and the club, to its credit, was prepared to give him a go. They were not disappointed. The team won every trophy on offer that year. The Minor Premiership, the Grand Final, the Hilton Shield and the Tristram Shield, in which Annerley F.C. won the final by nine goals to nil. The newspaper report stated that, "the team gave the finest display ever seen by a Brisbane Club team. Their controlled passing, interchanging, pace and machine-like play ripped the oppositions defence to ribbons".

Graham McMillan and his brother Lex spent one more year with Annerley F.C, but with the emergence of the ethnic clubs in Brisbane, Lex was signed by Polonia whilst Graham McMillan was signed by Hellenic F.C. In Graham McMillan's first year with Hellenic F.C. he finally had his knee operated on. After a short rehabilitation period McMillan was back playing, ending the season with Hellenic as champions. Graham McMillan played 9 seasons with Hellenic F.C. during which time the team won 5 Premierships plus many other trophies.

Graham McMillan retired in 1970 after a 1st Division career spanning 23 years. Graham McMillan represented the State of Queensland from 1956 to 1968, captaining the team in the latter years. Graham McMillan represented Australia on several occasions in the mid to late 1950s.

== Miscellaneous ==
Graham McMillan was invited and took part in the Torch Relay for the 2000 Sydney Olympics.

== Personal life ==
Graham McMillan married Mary Jones, in Brisbane in 1959. They have three children, Lissa McMillan, Lexia Willmington and Martin McMillan and five grandchildren (Elysha Willmington, Kelsey Willmington, Annika McMillan, Isaac Willmington and Connor McMillan).
