= Bunny Nunn =

Australian soccer player (1927–2008)

Gordon Nunn
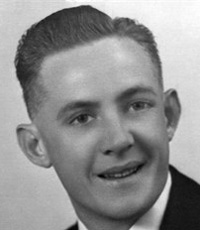

Personal information
- Full name: Gordon David Nunn
- Date of birth: 29 May 1927
- Place of birth: Ipswich, Queensland, Australia
- Date of death: 13 September 2008 (aged 81)
- Place of death: Australia
- Position: Forward

Youth career
- 1939: Bundamba School

Senior career*
| Years | Team | Apps | (Gls) |
| 1943-1950 | St Helen's | 70+ | (161+) |
| 1949 | → Metters (guest) | 1 | (1) |
| 1951-1953 | Caledonians | 28+ | (48+) |
| 1954 | St Helen's | 8+ | (15+) |
| Total | | 141+ | (225+) |

International career
| 1948-1958 | Australia | 27 | (18) |
- * Club domestic league appearances and goals

Gordon David Nunn (29 May 1927 – 13 September 2008), better known as Bunny Nunn, was an Australian soccer player who played as a forward.

== Early life ==
Nunn attended Bundamba State School before learning signwriting at the Ipswich Technical College.

During World War II, Nunn served with the Royal Australian Air Force with Air Sea Rescue. His service number was 171508.

== Club career ==
As a 17-year-old Nunn made his debut for Ipswich club St Helens. From 1951, he spent three seasons with Brisbane Caledonians before returning to St Helens in 1954. He later moved again to Brisbane to play for Azzurri.

== International career ==
Nunn played 11 times for Australia in full internationals, scoring seven times. He has been designated as Socceroo #110.

== Personal life ==
Nunn married Elizabeth Grieve Smith in 1950. They had four children and she predeceased him in 1972.

== Career statistics ==
Appearances and goals by club, season, and competition. Only official games are included in this table.
| Club | Season | League | | Tristram Shield | | Other | | Total | |
| Club | Season | Apps | Goals | Apps | Goals | Apps | Goals | Apps | Goals |
|---|---|---|---|---|---|---|---|---|---|
| St Helens | 1943 | 1 | 1 | 0 | 0 | 0 | 0 | 1 | 1 |
| St Helens | 1944 | 7+ | 29+ | 3 | 2 | 0 | 0 | 10+ | 31+ |
| St Helens | 1945 | 10+ | 23+ | 0 | 0 | 0 | 0 | 10+ | 23+ |
| St Helens | 1946 | 10+ | 11+ | 0 | 0 | 0 | 0 | 10+ | 11+ |
| St Helens | 1947 | 15+ | 41 | 2+ | 4+ | 0 | 0 | 17+ | 45+ |
| St Helens | 1948 | 12+ | 19+ | 1 | 3 | 0 | 0 | 13+ | 22+ |
| St Helens | 1949 | 12+ | 31+ | 1 | 0 | 0 | 0 | 13+ | 31+ |
| Metters | 1949 | 1 | 1 | 0 | 0 | 0 | 0 | 1 | 1 |
| St Helens | 1950 | 3+ | 6+ | 0 | 0 | 0 | 0 | 3+ | 6+ |
| Caledonians | 1951 | 5+ | 8+ | 1 | 1 | 2 | 3 | 8+ | 12+ |
| Caledonians | 1952 | 14+ | 24+ | 2 | 2 | 0 | 0 | 16+ | 26+ |
| Caledonians | 1953 | 9+ | 16+ | 3 | 9 | 0 | 0 | 12+ | 24+ |
| St Helens | 1954 | 8+ | 15+ | 0 | 0 | 1 | 1 | 9+ | 16+ |
| St Helens | Total | 141+ | 225+ | 13+ | 21+ | 3+ | 4+ | 157+ | 250+ |
