= Roy Crowhurst =

Australian association football player

Personal information
- Date of birth: 1909/1910
- Position: Winger

Senior career*
| Years | Team | Apps | (Gls) |
| 1920s–1940s | Metters | | |

International career
| 1933–1938 | Australia | 7 | (2) |
- * Club domestic league appearances and goals

Roy Crowhurst was an Australian international association football player who played as a winger for the Australia national soccer team during the 1930s.

== Club career ==
Crowhurst began his football career in the Sydney local leagues, playing in the third-grade system for Metters Soccer Football Club as early as 1925. He progressed through the ranks to become a star winger for the senior squad during the club's highly successful era in the 1930s and 1940s, winning multiple regional titles and tournaments including the Gardiner Challenge Cup.

Crowhurst played over 350 games before World War 2 interrupted football from 1941.

== International career ==
Crowhurst made his debut for the Australian national team (the Socceroos) on 5 June 1933 in a match against New Zealand. He became an key player of the national setup throughout the 1930s, ultimately representing Australia in 21 total match appearances.

Seven of those appearances were officially classified as "A" internationals. His international goal-scoring account opened during a high-scoring 6 - 4 victory against New Zealand at the Sydney Cricket Ground on 17 June 1933. His final international appearance came on 24 September 1938 against India. In total, he scored 8 goals for his country, two of which occurred in official "A" internationals.

== Honors and legacy ==
In 2003, Crowhurst was posthumously inducted into the Football Australia Hall of Fame for his contributions to the early development of Australian soccer.
