= Jimmy Osborne =

Australian soccer player (died 2002)

James Osborne (died 23 December 2002) was an Australian soccer player who played as a left midfielder.

== Club career ==
Osborne began playing with Plattsburg School.

In 1929 Osborne joined Wallsend. After a season with Wallsend he transferred to Weston where he only spent a year before moving back to Wallsend. In 1934 he moved to Granville, staying two seasons before signing for Metters. Osborne played ten seasons for Metters, playing his last season in 1945.

== International career ==
Osborne played seven times for Australia, captaining the national team once in a friendly against India in 1938.

== Death ==
Osborne died on 23 December 2002. Before his death he was the oldest living former member of the national team.
