= Jim Cant =

Scottish footballer

Personal information
- Position: Forward

Youth career
- Arbroath Lad's Club

Senior career*
Years	Team	Apps	(Gls)
1963–1975	Arbroath	283	(57)
	Raith Rovers	2	(0)
	Montrose	39	(2)
Total		324	(59)
- * Club domestic league appearances and goals

Jim Cant is a Scottish former footballer who played for Arbroath, Montrose and Raith Rovers.
