= Alf Quill =

Australian soccer player

Personal information
- Full name: Alfred Louis Quill
- Date of birth: 9 July 1910
- Place of birth: Ultimo, Sydney, Australia
- Date of death: 3 October 1997 (aged 87)
- Place of death: New Lambton, New South Wales, Australia
- Position: Forward

Senior career*
Years	Team	Apps	(Gls)
1927–1928	Pyrmont	10	(18)
1929–1930	Leichhardt-Annandale	42	(63)
1931–1933	Wallsend	37	(67)
1934–1936	Goodyear	59	(119)
1937–1943	Wallsend	114	(229)
1943	Lake Macquarie	1	(3)
1943–1949	Wallsend	93	(121)
Total		356	(620)

International career
1938	Australia	2	(2)

Managerial career
- Wallsend
- Australia
- Newcastle KB United (youth)
- * Club domestic league appearances and goals

Alfred Quill (9 July 1910 - 3 October 1997) was an Australian soccer player who played for the Australian national team among several other clubs in his 24-year senior career. Often considered one of the best soccer players in New South Wales, he scored 868 goals in all NSW competitions in his professional career.

== Early career ==
Quill was born in Sydney. He first showed his signs as a footballer, whilst attending Globe Public School. At the age of 12, he represented New South Wales as a schoolboy against Victoria, South Australia and Queensland. For three seasons he played for Wentworth Juniors before joining the senior side of Pyrmont.

== Club career ==
Beginning in his teens, Quill played 24 seasons.

=== Pyrmont ===
Quill began his career with Pyrmont at age 17 in the New South Wales State League in 1927.

=== Leichhardt-Annandale ===
While contracted at Leichhardt-Annandale, English club Bolton Wanderers wanted to sign Quill on 25 April 1931, which was rejected.

=== Wallsend ===
He made a return to Wallsend on a three-year contract on 6 January 1937. Quill did not have any intentions on leaving Wallsend at the end of the 1939 season, as he signed a form to stay with Wallsend. At the start of the 1943 season, he left Wallsend top play for Lake Macquarie, and returned to Wallsend on 22 May 1943 to play the remainder of the season. In the 1937 season, he scored a record 78 goals for Wallsend as a state record for most goals in a season.

He proposed a retirement from football at the end of the 1945 season, but he came back to Wallsend's squad in April 1946 to play a home match against Lysaght's-Orb the next week. Over his career he scored 802 goals in 477 league and cup matches, but some sources state that he retired in 1949 with 1,002 goals in total, although these numbers probably include goals in friendlies and unofficial matches. In total, he scored 271 top-tier goals after turning 30 years old in 1940, which makes him one of the most prolific top-tier goalscorers in that age bracket in the history of football.

== International career ==
Quill played twice in full international matches for Australia, both against India in September 1938, scoring twice in the former to help his side to a 5–3 win.

== Coaching career ==
After finishing playing he coached Wallsend before a stint as coach of Australia.

== Career statistics ==
=== Club ===
Appearances and goals by club, season, and competition. Only official games are included in this table.
Club	Season	League		State Premiership Sheahan Cup		State League Cup		Other		Total	
Club	Season	Apps	Goals	Apps	Goals	Apps	Goals	Apps	Goals	Apps	Goals
Pyrmont	1927	1	2	0	0	1	2	0	0	2	4
Pyrmont	1928	9	16	0	0	3	6	2	1	14	23
Leichhardt	1929	19	27	0	0	3	2	0	0	22	29
Leichhardt	1930	23	36	0	0	4	8	1	2	28	46
Wallsend	1931	12	18	0	0	1	2	0	0	13	20
Wallsend	1932	10	18	1	4	1	3	4	3	16	28
Wallsend	1933	15	31	1	1	3	4	1	1	20	37
Goodyear	1934	17	35	0	0	3	6	5	13	25	54
Goodyear	1935	22	39	0	0	4	9	1	0	27	48
Goodyear	1936	20	45	1	3	1	0	1	0	23	48
Wallsend	1937	22	63	4	3	3	7	3	5	32	78
Wallsend	1938	22	39	2	4	3	7	2	2	29	52
Wallsend	1939	19	23	1	4	2	2	1	0	23	29
Wallsend	1940	22	32	1	0	1	0	3	5	27	37
Wallsend	1941	19	41	2	4	3	3	3	5	27	53
Wallsend	1942	10	31	3	5	4	7	3	7	20	50
Lake Macquarie	1943	1	3	0	0	0	0	0	0	1	3
Wallsend
Wallsend	1943	13	30	1	0	1	1	6	10	21	41
Wallsend	1944	20	22	0	0	4	6	4	4	28	32
Wallsend	1945	13	24	2	1	1	1	4	3	20	29
Wallsend	1946	12	10	0	0	4	2	4	3	20	15
Wallsend	1947	12	13	0	0	2	5	4	5	19	23
Wallsend	1948	13	13	0	0	2	5	1	1	16	19
Wallsend	1949	10	9	0	0	3	5	0	0	13	14
Wallsend	Total	356	620	19	29	57	93	53	70	485	812

=== International ===
National team	Year	Competitive		Friendly		Total	
National team	Year	Apps	Goals	Apps	Goals	Apps	Goals
Australia	1938	0	0	2	2	2	2

List of international goals scored by Alf Quill
No.	Date	Venue	Opponent	Score	Result	Competition	Ref.
1	3 September 1938	Royal Agricultural Showground, Sydney, Australia	India	1–0	5–3	Friendly	
2	3 September 1938	Royal Agricultural Showground, Sydney, Australia	India	4–2	5–3	Friendly	

== Honours ==
- NSW State League: 1932, 1933, 1938, 1941, 1942, 1943, 1944
- NSW State League Cup: 1937, 1942, 1944
- NSW Robinson Cup: 1938, 1939
- NSW Daniels Cup: 1940, 1941, 1942, 1943, 1949

Individual

- NSW Top Scorer: 1932, 1933, 1936, 1937, 1938, 1939, 1943, 1945
