= Australia–New Zealand soccer rivalry =

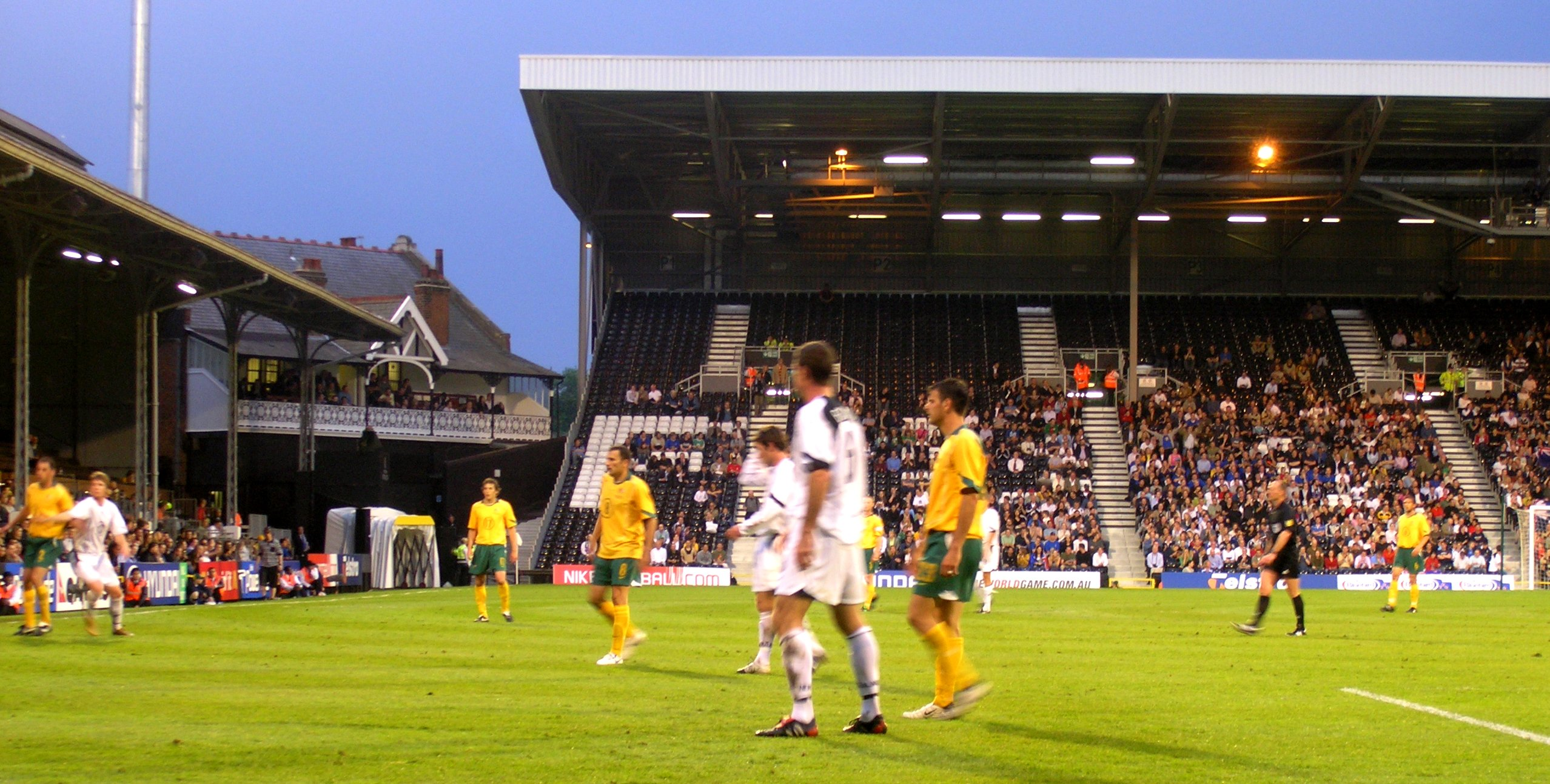
- Australia vs. New Zealand friendly match at Craven Cottage, London, 9 June 2005
- Other names: Socceroos vs. All Whites (men); Matildas vs. Football Ferns (women); Australasia derby
- Location: Australia (AFC); New Zealand (OFC)
- Teams: Australia men's Australia women's New Zealand men's New Zealand women's
- First meeting: Men: New Zealand 3–1 Australia (17 June 1922); Women: Australia 2–2 New Zealand (6 October 1979)
- Latest meeting: Men: New Zealand 1–3 Australia (9 September 2025); Women: Australia 3–1 New Zealand (12 April 2022)
- Next meeting: TBC
- Trophy: Trans-Tasman Cup; Soccer Ashes

Statistics
- Total meetings: Men: 69; Women: 53
- Most wins: Men: Australia (45); Women: Australia (35)
- Top scorer: (Australia) George Smith (16)
- All-time series: Men: Australia: 45; New Zealand: 13; Draws: 11; Women: Australia: 35; New Zealand: 10; Draws: 8
- Largest victory: Men: New Zealand 0–10 Australia (11 July 1936); Women: Australia 5–0 New Zealand (28 November 2025)

The Australia–New Zealand soccer rivalry is a sports rivalry that exists between the Australian men's/women's vs. New Zealand men's/women's national teams. It forms a part of a wider Trans-Tasman rivalry between the geographical neighbours of Australia and New Zealand in a range of sports including cricket, rugby league, rugby union and netball. Due to the countries' similar histories, language, and cultural and sporting interests, this wider rivalry is frequently referred to in the press as analogous to a sibling rivalry, although some fans, especially in New Zealand, reject this analogy as condescending.

The rivalry was more intense when Australia and New Zealand were both members of the Oceania Football Confederation (OFC) and regularly contested finals of the OFC Nations Cup and for top position in OFC World Cup Qualification campaigns. The rivalry has since been less frequent since Australia left the OFC to join the more competitive Asian Football Confederation (AFC) in 2006. In 2022, Football Australia and New Zealand Football planned a home and away series, to mark the 100th anniversary of the first meeting between the two nations, which was first played in Dunedin back in 1922. Australia has the better record overall in both the men's and women's fixtures.

== History ==
=== Men's ===
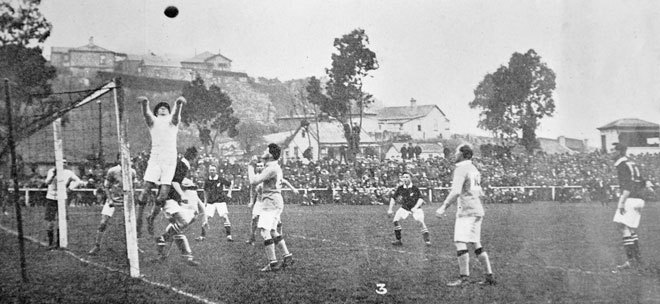
The first Australia team playing New Zealand in 1922

Both Australia and New Zealand's first official internationals were played against each other during the Australian 1922 tour of New Zealand. They played three matches at Carisbrook in Dunedin, Athletic Park in Wellington, and Auckland Domain. The results were two 3–1 wins to New Zealand and a 1–1 draw in Wellington. New Zealand would go on to win four of the first six matches with Australia picking up one win in the first game between the teams in Australia. From 1923 to 1954, the sides played for the "Soccer Ashes" trophy, a razor case carried by a former Private serving in the Gallipoli campaign, containing the ashes of cigars smoked by the teams' captains, Alex Gibb and George Campbell, after the sides first international series in 1923.

Australia and New Zealand would become regular opponents in exhibition matches for the next 36 years, with the trans-Tasman neighbours playing each other on 21 occasions in seven test series during that time period. This included Australia's largest victory over their rivals with a 10–0 win in 1936 at the Basin Reserve in Wellington.

By 2015, New Zealand had only won 13 games out of the 64 times the two teams met.

In 2022, the 'Soccer Ashes' were found in storage, having been lost for nearly seventy years. The teams subsequently announced that they would play a friendly for the Soccer Ashes in England in October 2023.

=== Women's ===
The Australian Women's Soccer Association (AWSA) was founded in 1974 while a New Zealand women's national team was formed the year after when they were invited to take part in the 1975 Asian Ladies’ Football Confederation Cup in Hong Kong. (Later recognised as the first Asian Cup). While the two teams would meet at the tournament, with New Zealand beating their Australian rivals 3–2, it wasn't considered the first official meeting between the countries due to the Australian side being a composite of players largely from the St. George-Budapest Club in Sydney. This changed in 2022 when Football Australia recognised the former players as official national team members.

What was considered the first official international match between the women's teams until the change in 2022, was on 6 October 1979 when New Zealand travelled to Australia for a three-match series. The game, played at Seymour Shaw Park, ended in a 2–2 draw. This was followed by a second match at the same venue with New Zealand winning 1–0 before the teams moved to Perry Park in Brisbane for the third game with Australia picking up their first win 1–0 ending the series in a draw.

=== Governing bodies ===
The New Zealand Football Association would become officially affiliated with FIFA in 1948, with the Australian Soccer Football Association given FIFA provisional membership in November 1954 and confirmed in June 1956. Both associations, along with Fiji and Papua New Guinea would go on to become the founding members of the Oceania Football Confederation in 1966.

== Men's matches ==
As of 9 September 2025.

Australia wins
New Zealand wins
Draws

No.	Competition	Date	Home team	Result	Away team	Home scorers	Away scorers	Venue	Attendance
1	Soccer Ashes	17 June 1922	New Zealand	3–1	Australia	Cook (20, ?), Knott (?)	Maunder	Carisbrook, Dunedin	8,000
2	Soccer Ashes	24 June 1922	New Zealand	1–1	Australia	Cook (10)	Bratton (25)	Athletic Park, Wellington	12,000
3	Soccer Ashes	8 July 1922	New Zealand	3–1	Australia	Ballard (5), Cook (10), Dacre (?)	Brown (?)	Domain Park, Auckland	15,000
4	Soccer Ashes	9 June 1923	Australia	2–1	New Zealand	Lennard (7), Maunder (90)	Dacre (57)	Brisbane Cricket Ground, Brisbane	7,000
5	Soccer Ashes	16 June 1923	Australia	2–3	New Zealand	Lennard (?), Gilmore (?)	Campbell (?, ?, ?)	Sydney Cricket Ground, Sydney	12,000
6	Soccer Ashes	30 June 1923	Australia	1–4	New Zealand	Maunder (?)	Campbell (46, 51, ?, ?)	Newcastle Showground, Newcastle	14,000
7	Soccer Ashes	5 June 1933	Australia	4–2	New Zealand	Smith (20, ?), Gorring (80, ?)	Kershaw (55), Chapman (?)	Brisbane Exhibition Ground, Brisbane	5,000
8	Soccer Ashes	17 June 1933	Australia	6–4	New Zealand	Smith (?, ?, ?), Crowhurst (?), Cameron (?), Hughes (?)	Kershaw (?), Ives (?), Kay (?), Chapman (?)	Sydney Cricket Ground, Sydney	5,000
9	Soccer Ashes	24 June 1933	Australia	4–2	New Zealand	Edwards (?), Crowhurst (?), Smith (?, ?)	Kershaw (?, ?)	Sydney Cricket Ground, Sydney	—
10	Soccer Ashes	4 July 1936	New Zealand	1–7	Australia	Jack Skinner (?)	Cameron (?, ?), Smith (?, ?, ?, ?), Price (?)	Logan Park, Dunedin	8,000
11	Soccer Ashes	11 July 1936	New Zealand	0–10	Australia		Smith (5, 32, 53, ?, ?), Price (9), Cameron (28), (48), Donaldson (?)	Basin Reserve, Wellington	8,000
12	Soccer Ashes	18 July 1936	New Zealand	1–4	Australia	Hagett (?)	Cameron (?, ?), Price (?, ?)	Blandford Park, Auckland	2,000
13	Soccer Ashes	18 July 1948	New Zealand	0–6	Australia		Frank Parsons (?, ?, ?), Cunningham (?), Hughes (?, ?)	Basin Reserve, Wellington	—
14	Soccer Ashes	28 August 1948	New Zealand	0–7	Australia		Parsons (?, ?, ?), Hughes (?, ?), Johns (?, ?), Cunningham (?)	Lancaster Park, Christchurch	—
15	Soccer Ashes	4 September 1948	New Zealand	0–4	Australia		Hughes (?), Johns (?, ?), Lawrie (?)	Basin Reserve, Wellington	—
16	Friendly	11 September 1948	New Zealand	1–8	Australia	Arthur Masters (?)	Parsons (6, ?, ?, ?, ?, ?), Cunningham (?), Hughes (?)	Blandford Park, Auckland	7,000
17	Soccer Ashes	14 August 1954	Australia	1–2	New Zealand	Robertson (75)	King (5), Steele (7)	Melbourne Showground, Melbourne	—
18	Soccer Ashes	28 August 1954	Australia	4–1	New Zealand	Robertson (20), Lennard (?), Stewart (?), (?)	Smith (?)	Brisbane Cricket Ground, Brisbane	7,000
19	Soccer Ashes	4 September 1954	Australia	4–1	New Zealand	Nunn (?, ?), Murphy (?), Stewart (?)	Steele Jr. (?)	Sydney Sports Ground, Sydney	5,798
20	Friendly	16 August 1958	New Zealand	2–3	Australia	Aird (30), Hume (80)	Nunn (14, 44), Adair (70)	Basin Reserve, Wellington	6,000
21	Friendly	23 August 1958	New Zealand	2–2	Australia	Steele Jnr (11, 46)	Aird (41 og), Vogler (?)	Carlaw Park, Auckland	8,500
22	1967 South Vietnam Independence Cup	5 November 1967	Australia	5–3	New Zealand	Baartz (7), Warren (13), Attila Abonyi (51, 75, 84)	Ray Mears (18), Van Alphen (42 og), Westwater (63 og)	Cong Hoa Stadium, Saigon	20,000
23	Friendly	9 October 1972	Australia	3–1	New Zealand	Abonyi (26), Baartz (54), Warren (76)	Vest (7)	Senayan Stadium, Jakarta	7,000
24	1974 FIFA World Cup qualification	4 March 1973	New Zealand	1–1	Australia	Turner (57)	Campbell (83)	Newmarket Park, Auckland	12,000
25	1974 FIFA World Cup qualification	16 March 1973	Australia	3–3	New Zealand	Utjesenovic (11), Baartz (17), Buljevic (26)	Vest (10), Tindall (49), Hogg (89 og)	Sydney Sports Ground, Sydney	11,000
26	Friendly	29 February 1976	New Zealand	0–1	Australia		Harding (78)	Newmarket Park, Auckland	10,000
27	Friendly	2 March 1976	Australia	3–1	New Zealand	Barnes (7), Ollerton (14), Abonyi (70)	Taylor (74)	Olympic Park, Melbourne	6,000
28	1978 FIFA World Cup qualification	27 March 1977	Australia	3–1	New Zealand	Ollerton (60, 80), Kosmina (72),	Nelson (4)	Sydney Cricket Ground, Sydney	12,250
29	1978 FIFA World Cup qualification	30 March 1977	New Zealand	1–1	Australia	Nelson (34)	Ollerton (18)	Newmarket Park, Auckland	12,000
30	Friendly	13 June 1979	New Zealand	1–0	Australia	Ormond (58)		Newmarket Park, Auckland	4,000
31	1982 FIFA World Cup qualification	25 April 1981	New Zealand	3–3	Australia	Turner (24), Wooddin (34), Sumner (80)	Krncevic (15), (42), Boden (31)	Mount Smart Stadium, Auckland	15,000
32	1982 FIFA World Cup qualification	16 May 1981	Australia	0–2	New Zealand		Woodin (30), Turner (83)	Sydney Cricket Ground, Sydney	15,000
33	Trans-Tasman Cup	22 February 1983	New Zealand	2–1	Australia	Cresswell (47), Herbert (89)	Kosmina (36)	Mount Smart Stadium, Auckland	3,000
34	Trans-Tasman Cup	27 February 1983	Australia	0–2	New Zealand		Cole (66), Adam (73)	Olympic Park, Melbourne	14,000
35	1986 FIFA World Cup qualification	21 September 1985	New Zealand	0–0	Australia			Mount Smart Stadium, Auckland	14,826
36	1986 FIFA World Cup qualification	3 November 1985	Australia	2–0	New Zealand	Kosmina (12), Mitchell (48)		Sydney Cricket Ground, Sydney	21,910
37	Trans-Tasman Cup	25 October 1986	New Zealand	1–1	Australia	Deeley (60)	Arnold (52)	Mount Smart Stadium, Auckland	3,156
38	Trans-Tasman Cup	2 November 1986	Australia	2–1	New Zealand	Arnold (29), Zinni (74)	Deeley (85)	Sydney Cricket Ground, Sydney	1,986
39	Trans-Tasman Cup	2 September 1987	Australia	1–1	New Zealand	Zinni (69)	Ironside (83)	Olympic Park, Melbourne	5,000
40	Trans-Tasman Cup	9 September 1987	New Zealand	1–0	Australia	De Jong (19)		Hutt Recreation Ground, Wellington	5,000
41	1988 Summer Olympics qualification	13 March 1988	Australia	3–1	New Zealand	Patikas (?), Farina (?), Crino (?)	McGarry (?)	Sydney Football Stadium, Sydney	—
42	1988 Summer Olympics qualification	23 March 1988	New Zealand	1–1	Australia	Farina (?)	McGarry (?)	Athletic Park, Wellington	—
43	Trans-Tasman Cup	12 October 1988	New Zealand	1–2	Australia	Ironside (78)	Crino (65), Ollerenshaw (75)	Caledonian Ground, Dunedin	3,000
44	Trans-Tasman Cup	16 October 1988	Australia	2–0	New Zealand	Spink (42, 68)		Queen Elizabeth Oval, Bendigo	3,000
45	1990 FIFA World Cup qualification	12 March 1989	Australia	4–1	New Zealand	Crino (16), Arnold (42, 56), Yankos (78)	Dunford (70)	Sydney Football Stadium, Sydney	13,621
46	1990 FIFA World Cup qualification	2 April 1989	New Zealand	2–0	Australia	Dunford (19), Wright (78)		Mount Smart Stadium, Auckland	8,500
47	Trans-Tasman Cup	12 May 1991	New Zealand	0–1	Australia		Milosevic (44)	QEII Stadium, Christchurch	7,500
48	Trans-Tasman Cup	15 May 1991	Australia	2–1	New Zealand	Vidmar (46), Peterson (49)	Roberts (79)	Hindmarsh Stadium, Adelaide	5,000
49	1994 FIFA World Cup qualification	30 May 1993	New Zealand	0–1	Australia		Arnold (59)	Mount Smart Stadium, Auckland	12,000
50	1994 FIFA World Cup qualification	6 June 1993	Australia	3–0	New Zealand	Veart (1), Vidmar (3), Zelic (49)		Olympic Park, Melbourne	9,445
51	Trans-Tasman Cup (Note: Tournament also part of another tournament, this being the 1996 OFC Nations Cup.)	10 November 1995	New Zealand	0–0	Australia			QEII Stadium, Christchurch	5,000
52	Trans-Tasman Cup	15 November 1995	Australia	3–0	New Zealand	Mori (32), Wade (45), Spiteri (50)		Breakers Stadium, Newcastle	8,858
53	1997 Optus World Series	18 January 1997	Australia	1–0	New Zealand	Bingley (24)		Lakeside Stadium, Melbourne	10,494
54	1998 FIFA World Cup qualification	28 June 1997	New Zealand	0–3	Australia		Aloisi (19), Vidmar (42), Foster (66)	North Harbour Stadium, Auckland	20,000
55	1998 FIFA World Cup qualification	6 July 1997	Australia	2–0	New Zealand	Zelic (6), Arnold (54)		Parramatta Stadium, Sydney	14,054
56	1998 OFC Nations Cup	4 October 1998	Australia	0–1	New Zealand		Burton (24)	Suncorp Stadium, Brisbane	12,000
57	2000 OFC Nations Cup	28 June 2000	Australia	2–0	New Zealand	Murphy (40), Foster (66)		Stade de Pater, Papeete	4,250
58	2002 FIFA World Cup qualification	20 June 2001	New Zealand	0–2	Australia		Emerton (5, 80)	Westpac Trust Stadium, Wellington	19,500
59	2002 FIFA World Cup qualification	24 June 2001	Australia	4–1	New Zealand	Zdrilic (5, 82), Emerton (40), Aloisi (56)	Coveny (44)	Stadium Australia, Sydney	41,976
60	2002 OFC Nations Cup	14 July 2002	New Zealand	1–0	Australia	Nelsen (78)		Ericsson Stadium, Auckland	6,000
61	2004 OFC Nations Cup	29 May 2004	Australia	1–0	New Zealand	Bresciano (40)		Hindmarsh Stadium, Adelaide	12,100
62	Friendly	9 June 2005	Australia	1–0	New Zealand	Colosimo (86)		Craven Cottage, London	9,023
63	Friendly	24 May 2010	Australia	2–1	New Zealand	Vidošić (57), Holman (90)	Killen (16)	Melbourne Cricket Ground, Melbourne	55,659
64	Friendly	5 June 2011	Australia	3–0	New Zealand	Kennedy (9, 59), Troisi (90)		Adelaide Oval, Adelaide	21,281
65	Friendly	22 September 2022	Australia	1–0	New Zealand	Mabil (32)		Suncorp Stadium, Brisbane	25,392
66	Friendly	25 September 2022	New Zealand	0–2	Australia		Duke (54), Cummings (80)	Eden Park, Auckland	34,985
67	Soccer Ashes	18 October 2023	Australia	2–0	New Zealand	Souttar (13), Irvine (76)		Gtech Community Stadium, Brentford	5,761
68	Soccer Ashes	5 September 2025	Australia	1–0	New Zealand	Balard (87)		GIO Stadium, Canberra	19,115
69	Soccer Ashes	9 September 2025	New Zealand	1–3	Australia	Wood (57)	Toure (35, 60), Irankunda (54)	Go Media Stadium, Auckland	18,213

== Boy's Youth Matches ==
=== U20 matches ===
No.	Competition	Date	Home team	Result	Away team
1	1978 OFC U-20 Championship	16 November 1978	New Zealand	1–2	Australia
2	1980 OFC U-20 Championship	13 December 1980	New Zealand	2–0	Australia
3	1982 OFC U-20 Championship	7 December 1982	Australia	2–1	New Zealand
4	1982 OFC U-20 Championship	12 December 1982	Australia	4–3	New Zealand
5	1985 OFC U-20 Championship	15 February 1985	Australia	2–1	New Zealand
6	Friendly	25 October 1986	New Zealand	5–2	Australia
7	1986 OFC U-20 Championship	26 January 1987	New Zealand	0–3	Australia
8	1988 OFC U-20 Championship	10 September 1988	Australia	1–0	New Zealand
9	1989 FIFA World Youth Championship qualifying	18 January 1989	Australia	3–0	New Zealand
10	1990 OFC U-20 Championship	8 September 1990	Australia	6–0	New Zealand
11	1994 OFC U-20 Championship	3 October 1994	Australia	1–0	New Zealand
12	1997 OFC U-20 Championship	6 January 1997	Australia	3–0	New Zealand
13	1997 OFC U-20 Championship	10 January 1997	Australia	2–1	New Zealand
14	1998 OFC U-20 Championship	22 August 1998	Australia	3–2	New Zealand
15	2001 OFC U-20 Championship	28 February 2001	New Zealand	2–1	Australia
16	2001 OFC U-20 Championship	4 March 2001	Australia	3–1	New Zealand
17	Friendly	4 May 2006	Australia	0–1	New Zealand
18	Friendly	7 May 2006	Australia	1–3	New Zealand
19	Friendly	10 May 2006	Australia	4–2	New Zealand
20	Friendly	10 June 2013	Australia	5–0	New Zealand
21	Friendly	3 May 2015	New Zealand	2–3	Australia

=== U17 matches ===
No.	Competition	Date	Home team	Result	Away team
1	1983 OFC U-17 Championship	10 December 1983	New Zealand	1–2	Australia
2	1986 OFC U-17 Championship	14 December 1986	Australia	0–1	New Zealand
3	1989 OFC U-17 Championship	29 January 1989	Australia	5–1	New Zealand
4	1991 OFC U-17 Championship	13 January 1991	Australia	1–1	New Zealand
5	1991 OFC U-17 Championship	21 January 1991	New Zealand	0–1	Australia
6	1995 OFC U-17 Championship	26 May 1995	Australia	1–0	New Zealand
7	1995 OFC U-17 Championship	26 May 1995	Australia	1–0	New Zealand
8	1997 OFC U-17 Championship	25 April 1997	New Zealand	1–0	Australia
9	2001 OFC U-17 Championship	4 April 2001	Australia	3–0	New Zealand
10	2001 OFC U-17 Championship	8 April 2001	New Zealand	0–6	Australia
11	OFC U-16 Pacific Cup	22 January 2002	Australia	4–1	New Zealand
12	2003 OFC U-17 Championship	22 February 2003	Australia	3–1	New Zealand

=== U23/Olympic matches ===
No.	Competition	Date	Home team	Result	Away team
1	1991 OFC Men's Olympic Qualifying Tournament	22 May 1991	Australia	2–0	New Zealand
2	1991 OFC Men's Olympic Qualifying Tournament	13 November 1991	New Zealand	1–2	Australia
3	1996 OFC Men's Olympic Qualifying Tournament	21 January 1996	New Zealand	0–5	Australia
4	1996 OFC Men's Olympic Qualifying Tournament	31 January 1996	Australia	0–1	New Zealand
5	Friendly	13 June 1998	Australia	1–0	New Zealand
6	Friendly	17 June 1998	Australia	2–0	New Zealand
7	Friendly	20 June 1998	Australia	4–0	New Zealand
8	Friendly	30 June 1999	New Zealand	0–2	Australia
9	Friendly	3 July 1999	New Zealand	0–3	Australia
10	2004 OFC Men's Olympic Qualifying Tournament	26 January 2004	Australia	2–0	New Zealand
11	2004 OFC Men's Olympic Qualifying Tournament	30 January 2004	New Zealand	1–1	Australia
12	Friendly	12 July 2008	Australia	3–2	New Zealand
13	Friendly	6 September 2019	Australia	1–1	New Zealand
14	Friendly	9 September 2019	Australia	1–1	New Zealand
15	Friendly	12 July 2021	Australia	0–2	New Zealand
16	Friendly	15 July 2021	Australia	1–0	New Zealand

== Oceanian and international club competitions ==
No.	Competition	Date	Home team		Result	Away team	
1	1987 Oceania Cup Winners' Cup	8 March 1987	(New Zealand)	North Shore United	0–2	Sydney City	(Australia)
2	1987 Oceania Club Championship	15 March 1987	(Australia)	Adelaide City	1–1 (Note: Score was 1–1 after 90 minutes and extra time. Adelaide City won the penalty shoot-out 4–1.)	University-Mount Wellington	(New Zealand)
3	2001 OFC Club Championship	17 January 2001	(New Zealand)	Napier City Rovers	0–1	Wollongong Wolves	(Australia)
4	2005 OFC Club Championship	31 May 2005	(Australia)	Sydney FC	3–2	Auckland City	(New Zealand)
5	2008 FIFA Club World Cup	11 December 2008	(Australia)	Adelaide United	2–1	Waitakere United	(New Zealand)
6	2026 OFC Professional League	1 February 2026	(New Zealand)	South Island United	3–3	South Melbourne	(Australia)
7	2026 OFC Professional League	21 February 2026	(Australia)	South Melbourne	1–1	Auckland FC	(New Zealand)
8	2026 OFC Professional League	27 February 2026	(Australia)	South Melbourne	4–1	South Island United	(New Zealand)
9	2026 OFC Professional League	12 April 2026	(New Zealand)	Auckland FC	3–2	South Melbourne	(Australia)
10	2026 OFC Professional League	6 May 2026	(New Zealand)	Auckland FC	1–2	South Melbourne	(Australia)
11	2026 OFC Professional League	9 May 2026	(Australia)	South Melbourne	4–2	South Island United	(New Zealand)
12	2026 OFC Professional League	9 May 2026	(Australia)	South Melbourne	1–2	Auckland FC	(New Zealand)

== Women's matches ==
As of 5 June 2011

Australia and New Zealand have played 53 official matches. Australia have the better record overall in the fixture, with 35 wins to New Zealand's 10. There have been 8 draws, only two of them goalless. Australia have scored 95 goals to 43 by New Zealand.

Australia wins
New Zealand wins
Draws

No.	Competition	Date	Home team	Result	Away team	Home scorers	Away scorers	Venue	Attendance
1	1975 AFC Women's Championship	31 Aug 1975	New Zealand	3–2	Australia	Marshall (20'), Richardson (26', 50')	Barry (48'), Dolan (59')	Government Stadium, Hong Kong	6,655
2	Trans-Tasman Cup	6 Oct 1979	Australia	2–2	New Zealand	Brentnall (?), Mateljan (?)	Marshall (?), Hetherington (?)	Seymour Shaw Park, Sydney	
3	Trans-Tasman Cup	8 Oct 1979	Australia	0–1	New Zealand		Ah Wong (?)	Seymour Shaw Park, Sydney	
4	Trans-Tasman Cup	13 Oct 1979	Australia	1–0	New Zealand	Lovelace (?)		Perry Park, Brisbane	
5	Rose Bowl Series	18 May 1980	New Zealand	3–3	Australia	Leonidas (?), Jacobsen (?), Marshall (?)	Heydon (?), Brentnall (?), Te Huia (o.g. ?)	University Park, Auckland	
6	Rose Bowl Series	21 May 1980	New Zealand	1–1	Australia	Sharpe (?)	Brentnall (23')	Newtown Park, Wellington	
7	Rose Bowl Series	24 May 1980	New Zealand	2–3	Australia	Jacobsen (?), Grant (?)	Brentnall (9', 20', 51')	Queen Elizabeth Park, Christchurch	
8	Trans-Tasman Cup	5 Oct 1981	New Zealand	1–2	Australia	Fulham (?)	Porter (?), Brentnall (?)	Gallaher Park, Auckland	

== Overall summary ==
=== Men's results ===
As of 9 September 2025.

Australia		Draws	New Zealand	
Wins	45	11	13	Wins
Goals	164	—N/a	71	Goals
WPCT	65.22%	15.94%	18.84%	WPCT
Under-20
Wins	16	0	5	Wins
Goals	51	—N/a	26	Goals
Under-17
Wins	9	1	2	Wins
Goals	27	—N/a	7	Goals
Under-23 / Olympic
Wins	11	3	2	Wins
Goals	30	—N/a	9	Goals

Men's Team	GP	W	D	L	GF	GA	GD
Australia	69	45	11	13	164	71	+94
New Zealand	69	13	11	45	71	164	–94

=== Women's results ===
As of 23 May 2026.

Australia		Draws	New Zealand	
Wins	37	8	10	Wins
Goals	102	—N/a	43	Goals
WPCT	67.27%	14.55%	18.18%	WPCT
Under-20
Wins	8	8	7	Wins
Goals	37	—N/a	21	Goals
Under-17
Wins	6	2	4	Wins
Goals	18	—N/a	15	Goals

Women's Team	GP	W	D	L	GF	GA	GD
Australia	53	35	8	10	95	43	+52
New Zealand	53	10	8	35	43	95	–52

=== Major official titles comparison ===
Senior titles	Australia	New Zealand
FIFA World Cup	0	0
FIFA Confederations Cup	0	0
OFC Men's Nations Cup	4	6
AFC Asian Cup	1	—N/a
AFC–OFC Challenge Cup	0	0
Soccer Ashes	6	2
Trans-Tasman Cup	4	2
Total senior titles	15	10
Youth titles	Australia	New Zealand
Summer Olympics	0	0
Pacific Games	0	1
OFC Men's Olympic Qualifying Tournament	4	5
FIFA U-20 World Cup	0	0
FIFA U-17 World Cup	0	0
OFC U-19 Men's Championship	12	9
OFC U-16 Men's Championship	10	11
OFC U-16 Pacific Cup	1	0
Total youth titles	29	26
Grand total	44	36

== Top scorers ==
As of 5 June 2011

Players in bold are still available for selection.

Rank	Player	Team	Goals
1	George Smith	Australia	16
2	Frank Parsons	Australia	12
3	George Campbell	New Zealand	7
4	Alec Cameron	Australia	6
4	Billy Price	Australia	6
4	Ron Hughes	Australia	6
4	Graham Arnold	Australia	6
8	Attila Abonyi	Australia	5
9	Ted Cook	New Zealand	4
9	Jim Kershaw	New Zealand	4
9	Charlie Steele, Jr.	New Zealand	4
9	Peter Ollerton	Australia	4

== See also ==
- Soccer Ashes
- Australia–New Zealand sporting relations
- List of association football club rivalries in Asia and Oceania
- Australia–New Zealand sports rivalries
