= Soccer Ashes =

Football competition between Australia and New Zealand

- Founded: 1923; 103 years ago
- Teams: 2
- Current champions: Australia
- Most championships: Australia (6 series wins)

The Soccer Ashes is an association football trophy contested by Australia and New Zealand. It was initially held between the 1920s and 1950s before the trophy was lost. The trophy was found in 2023, and a renewal was held in London in October.

== History ==
The concept of awarding a trophy made of ashes was inspired by the Ashes urn awarded to the winner of series between Australia and England in cricket.

The Soccer Ashes were created in 1923 after New Zealand had defeated Australia in the inaugural series in 1922. The ashes consisted of the remains of cigars smoked by the two captains, Alec Gibb (Australia) and George Campbell (New Zealand), after the first match between the two teams on Australian soil in June 1923. The ashes were encased in a razor case used by Australian soldier, William Fisher during the Gallipoli campaign during World War I. Fisher was also the secretary of the Queensland Football Association. The case was then set in a box made of wood from both countries.

The whereabouts of the trophy were not known from the mid-1950s until it was found in 2023 at the estate of former Australian Soccer Football Association chairman Sydney Storey by his grandchildren. Upon the recovery of the trophy, the first edition of the match since 1954 was scheduled for October. It was played in London, with Australia winning the series.

The All Whites and Socceroos played a two-match series in September 2025. Australia won the first match 1–0 in Canberra and the second match 3–1 in Auckland, thereby securing the Soccer Ashes trophy.

== List of Soccer Ashes series ==
S	Years	Host	M	(Australia)	(New Zealand)	D	Result
1	1922	New Zealand	3	0	2	1	New Zealand
2	1923	Australia	3	1	2	0	New Zealand
3	1933	Australia	3	3	0	0	Australia
4	1936	New Zealand	3	3	0	0	Australia
5	1948	New Zealand	3	3	0	0	Australia
6	1954	Australia	3	2	1	0	Australia
7	2023	England	1	1	0	0	Australia
8	2025	Australia, New Zealand	2	2	0	0	Australia

== Editions ==
=== 1922 ===
17 June	New Zealand	3–1	Australia	Dunedin, New Zealand
	Cook 20', ?'; Knott ?'	Report	Maunder 45'	Stadium: Carisbrook; Attendance: 10,000~; Referee: M. Thornley (New Zealand)

24 June	New Zealand	1–1	Australia	Wellington, New Zealand
	Cook 10'	Report	Bratton 25'	Stadium: Athletic Park; Attendance: 12,000; Referee: R.S. Lithgrow (New Zealand)

8 July	New Zealand	3–1	Australia	Auckland, New Zealand
	Ballard 5'; Cook 10'; Dacre ?'	Report	Brown ?'	Stadium: Carlaw Park; Attendance: 15,000; Referee: L.C.H. Dawson (New Zealand)

New Zealand won 2−1–0 on series.

=== 1923 ===
9 June	Australia	2–1	New Zealand	Brisbane, Australia
	Lennard 7'; Maunder 90'	Report	Dacre 57'	Stadium: Brisbane Cricket Ground; Attendance: 7,000; Referee: M. Thornley (New Zealand)

16 June	Australia	2–3	New Zealand	Sydney, Australia
	Lennard ?'; Gilmore ?'	Report	Campbell ?', ?', ?'	Stadium: Sydney Cricket Ground; Attendance: 10,000; Referee: A. Jackson (Australia)

30 June	Australia	1–4	New Zealand	Newcastle, Australia
	Maunder ?'	Report	Campbell 46', 51', ?', ?'	Stadium: Newcastle Showground; Attendance: 14,000; Referee: LB Tamlyn (Australia)

New Zealand won 2−0–1 on series.

=== 1933 ===
5 June	Australia	4–2	New Zealand	Brisbane, Australia
	Smith 20', ?'; Gorring ?', 80'	Report	Kershaw 55'; Chapman ?'	Stadium: Brisbane Exhibition Ground; Attendance: 5,000; Referee: Z. Korotcoff (Australia)

17 June	Australia	6–4	New Zealand	Sydney, Australia
	G. Smith ?', ?', ?'; Crowhurst ?'; Cameron ?'; Hughes ?'	Report		Stadium: Sydney Cricket Ground; Attendance: 5,000; Referee: D. Quinn (Australia)

24 June	Australia	4–2	New Zealand	Sydney, Australia
	Edwards ?'; Crowhurst ?'; G. Smith ?', ?'	Report	Kershaw ?' (pen.), ?'	Stadium: Sydney Cricket Ground; Referee: D. Quinn (Australia)

Australia won 3−0–0 on series.

=== 1936 ===
4 July	New Zealand	1–7	Australia	Dunedin, New Zealand
	Skinner ?' (pen.)	Report	Smith ?', ?', ?', ?'; Price ?', ?'; Cameron ?'	Stadium: Logan Park; Attendance: 8,000; Referee: W.P. Smith (New Zealand)

11 July	New Zealand	0–10	Australia	Wellington, New Zealand
		Report	Smith 32', ?', 53', ?', ?'; Price 9', ?'; Cameron 28', 48'; Donaldson ?'	Stadium: Basin Reserve; Attendance: 8,000; Referee: G. Jackson (New Zealand)

18 July	New Zealand	1–4	Australia	Auckland, New Zealand
	Haggett ?'	Report	Cameron ?', ?'; Price ?', ?'	Stadium: Blandford Park; Attendance: 2,000; Referee: A. Firth (New Zealand)

Australia won 3−0–0 on series.

=== 1948 ===
14 August	New Zealand	0–6	Australia	Wellington, New Zealand
		Report	Parsons ?', ?', ?'; Hughes ?', ?'; Cunningham ?'	Stadium: Basin Reserve; Attendance: Referee: V. Wheeler (New Zealand)

28 August	New Zealand	0–7	Australia	Christchurch, New Zealand
		Report	Parsons ?', ?', ?'; Hughes ?', ?'; Cunningham ?'; Johns ?'	Stadium: Lancaster Park; Referee: T. Gottermeyer (New Zealand)

4 September	New Zealand	0–4	Australia	Wellington, New Zealand
		Report	Johns ?', ?'; Hughes ?'; Lawrie ?'	Stadium: Basin Reserve; Attendance: 3,000; Referee: J. Sanderson (New Zealand)

Australia won 3−0–0 on series.

=== 1954 ===
14 August	Australia	1–2	New Zealand	Melbourne, Australia
14:45 UTC+10	Robertson 75'	Report	King 5'; Steele Jr. 7'	Stadium: Melbourne Showgrounds; Referee: George Gatt (Australia)

28 August	Australia	4–1	New Zealand	Brisbane, Australia
15:15	Robertson 19'; Stewart 30', 88'; Lennard 50'	Report	Smith 52'	Stadium: Brisbane Cricket Ground; Attendance: 6,400; Referee: V. Robertson (Australia)

4 September	Australia	4–1	New Zealand	Sydney, Australia
15:00	Stewart ?'; Nunn ?', ?'; Murray ?'	Report	Steele Jr. ?'	Stadium: Sydney Sports Ground; Attendance: 5,798; Referee: Dick Thorpe (Australia)

Australia won 2−0–1 on series.

=== 2023 ===
17 October
19:45 BST

Australia	2–0	New Zealand
Souttar 13'; Irvine 76'	Report

Gtech Community Stadium, London
Attendance: 5,761
Referee: Stuart Attwell (England)

Australia	New Zealand

GK	1	Mathew Ryan (c)
RB	17	Lewis Miller	(substituted off) 46'
CB	19	Harry Souttar
CB	23	Alessandro Circati
LB	5	Jordan Bos	(substituted off) 66'
DM	20	Keanu Baccus
RM	6	Martin Boyle	(substituted off) 82'
CM	21	Massimo Luongo	(substituted off) 66'
CM	8	Connor Metcalfe	(substituted off) 81'
LM	16	Aziz Behich
CF	15	Mitchell Duke	(substituted off) 66'
Substitutions:
DF	13	Ryan Strain	(substituted on) 46'
FW	9	Brandon Borrello	(substituted on) 66'
FW	10	Craig Goodwin	(substituted on) 66'
MF	22	Jackson Irvine	(substituted on) 66'
MF	14	Aiden O'Neill	(substituted on) 81'
FW	7	Samuel Silvera	(substituted on) 82'
Manager:
Graham Arnold

GK	22	Michael Woud
CB	5	Michael Boxall	(substituted off) 81'
CB	6	Bill Tuiloma	(substituted off) 73'
CB	4	Nando Pijnaker
RM	20	Callum McCowatt
CM	7	Matthew Garbett
CM	8	Marko Stamenić
LM	13	Liberato Cacace
RF	16	Elijah Just	(substituted off) 73'
CF	9	Chris Wood (c)	(substituted off) 81'
LF	17	Alex Greive	(substituted off) 67'
Substitutions:
FW	14	Joe Champness	(substituted on) 67'
FW	19	Ben Waine	(substituted on) 73'
DF	2	Niko Kirwan	(substituted on) 73'
FW	21	Max Mata	(substituted on) 81'
DF	18	Tyler Bindon	(substituted on) 81'
Manager:
(England) Darren Bazeley

Assistant referees:
Simon Bennett (England)
Lee Betts (England)
Fourth official:
Darren England (England)

=== 2025 ===
Team 1	Agg.	Team 2	1st leg	2nd leg
Australia	4–1	New Zealand	1–0	3–1

5 September	Australia	1–0	New Zealand	Canberra, Australia
19:45 UTC+10	Balard 87'	Source		Stadium: GIO Stadium; Attendance: 19,115; Referee: Donald Robertson (Scotland)

9 September	New Zealand	1–3	Australia	Auckland, New Zealand
19:00 UTC+12	Wood 57'	Source	Touré 35', 60'; Irankunda 54'	Stadium: Mount Smart Stadium; Attendance: 18,213; Referee: Donald Robertson (Scotland)

Australia won 4–1 on aggregate.

== Performances ==
As of 9 September 2025.

Overall Match Results:
Matches played	Australia wins	New Zealand wins	Draws
21	15	5	1

Overall Series Results:
Series played	Australia wins	New Zealand wins	Draws
8	6	2	0

== See also ==
- Trans-Tasman Cup
- Australia–New Zealand soccer rivalry
