= Pacific Cup (disambiguation) =

The Pacific Cup was a rugby league football competition, that ran from 1974 to 2009.

It may also refer to:

- Pacific Cup (yacht race)
- Pacific Cup International, an indoor carpet court tennis tournament
- Hlinka Gretzky Cup, an ice hockey tournament called the Pacific Cup in the early 1990s
- AFL Pacific Cup, an Australian rules football tournament
- ECCW Pacific Cup, a professional wrestling tournament
- OFC U-16 Pacific Cup, a defunct association football tournament that ran from 2002 to 2012
- Women's T20I Pacific Cup, a cricket tournament
- The top division of the Rugby League Pacific Championships
