= Arthur Masters (New Zealand footballer) =

New Zealand footballer

Personal information
- Full name: Arthur Masters
- Place of birth: New Zealand

Senior career*
Years	Team	Apps	(Gls)
- Comrades

International career
1948	New Zealand	1	(1)
- * Club domestic league appearances and goals

Arthur Masters is a former association football player who represented New Zealand at international level.

Masters made a solitary official international appearance for New Zealand in a 1–8 loss to Australia on 11 September 1948, Masters scoring New Zealand's goal that day.
