= Charles Ives (footballer) =

New Zealand footballer

Personal information
- Full name: Charles Edward Ives
- Date of birth: 11 April 1907
- Place of birth: New Zealand
- Date of death: 24 October 1942 (aged 35)
- Place of death: El Alamein, Egypt

Senior career*
Years	Team	Apps	(Gls)
- Port Chalmers

International career
1933	New Zealand	2	(1)
- * Club domestic league appearances and goals

Charles Edward Ives (11 April 1907 – 24 October 1942) was a New Zealand footballer who represented New Zealand at international level.

Ives played two official A-international matches for the All Whites in 1933 against trans-Tasman neighbours Australia as part of a 13 match tour, the first a 4–6 loss on 17 June 1933, Ives being amongst the New Zealand goalscorers, followed by a 2–4 loss on 24 June.

== Personal life ==
Ives worked as a hospital attendant. He served as a private in the 26th Battalion of the New Zealand Military Forces during the Second World War and was involved in the Second Battle of El Alamein in October 1942. Ives was mentioned in the battalion's war history for his conduct as a stretcher bearer on 23 October. He was killed in action the following day and is buried at El Alamein War Cemetery.
