= Jack Skinner (New Zealand footballer) =

New Zealand footballer

Personal information
- Full name: Jack Lorraine Skinner
- Date of birth: 11 August 1915
- Place of birth: New Zealand
- Date of death: 3 January 2002 (aged 86)

Senior career*
Years	Team	Apps	(Gls)
1934-1935	Technical	24	(23)
1936	Roslyn Wakari	7	(10)
1937-1947	Mosgiel	88	(185)
1948-1949	Waterside		
Total		119	(218)

International career
1936	New Zealand	2	(1)
- * Club domestic league appearances and goals

Jack Lorraine Skinner (11 August 1915 – 3 January 2002) was a football (soccer) player who represented New Zealand at international level.

Skinner made two appearances in official internationals for the All Whites, scoring New Zealand's goal in a 1–7 loss to Australia on 4 July 1936, while his second match, losing 0–10 to Australia on 11 July 1936, still stands as New Zealand's biggest loss in official matches, although New Zealand have been beaten by more in unofficial matches, notably England Amateurs in 1937 and Manchester United in 1967.
