= 1967 South Vietnam Independence Cup =

Tournament details
- Host country: South Vietnam
- City: Saigon
- Dates: 4–14 November 1967
- Teams: 8
- Venue: Cong Hoa Stadium

Final positions
- Champions: Australia (1st title)
- Runners-up: South Korea
- Third place: South Vietnam
- Fourth place: Malaysia

Tournament statistics
- Matches played: 16
- Goals scored: 62 (3.88 per match)

The 1967 South Vietnam Independence Cup (Vietnamese: Cúp Quốc Khánh 1967) was an invitational men's association football tournament hosted by South Vietnam and played in Saigon during the Vietnam War by national teams from mostly anti-communist nations that supported the American war effort. The tournament was meant to be as a propaganda exercise.

The tournament had previously been held annually since 1961, though only involving South East Asian nations. It was New Zealand's first international tournament and it was to become Australia's first honour in international football. The Australian team toured South East Asia before and after the tournament, winning all ten matches. Eight of the team's players went on to be part of Australia's 1974 FIFA World Cup squad, but their achievement in Saigon was largely overlooked back home.

Matches at Cong Hoa Stadium and training at an army base adjacent to a mine-field were conducted under armed guard and the teams also trained on their hotel roof. The tournament was held during monsoon season and many matches were rainy and muddy. Attendance was around 20,000–40,000 per match. There was unrest at some matches involving Australia: tear gas was deployed for the semi-final against Malaysia and security had to break up a brawl between the teams and the team had rocks thrown at them after they beat the hosts; the vice-president of South Vietnam had promised his team a bonus at half-time to no avail. The final nearly did not take place after Australian military personnel were kept from being spectators until the team threatened a boycott. Despite the previous hostility, the local crowd supported Australia over South Korea in the final. The coach of the Australian team had agreed to let them keep their tracksuits if they won.

The teams complained about the food and conditions at the Caravelle Hotel, where all the teams stayed. An example was when an Australian player was non-fatally electrocuted by a power socket. There may have been a foiled plot to bomb the building. A New Zealand player fell ill and had to stay in hospital for three weeks when his team flew home.

== Participants ==
- Australia
- Hong Kong
- Malaysia
- New Zealand
- ~~Philippines~~ (withdrew after initial draw)
- Singapore
- South Korea
- South Vietnam
- Thailand

Invited but decline/withdrew

- Japan
- Taiwan
- Indonesia
- India

== Draw ==
The initial draw was held in October 1967 with seven entrant teams. The teams were divided into two. South Vietnam as host are free to select their own group.

The draw was revised by early November 1967, with the Philippines withdrawing due to its student-athlete's academic commitments. South Korea replaced the Philippines. Hong Kong joined as well.

Draw results
Initial draw		Redraw	
Group A	Group B	Group A	Group B
South Vietnam	New Zealand	South Vietnam	Malaysia
Australia	Thailand	Australia	Thailand
Singapore	Malaysia	New Zealand	South Korea
Philippines	—N/a	Singapore	Hong Kong

== Group stage ==
=== Group A ===
Pos	Team	Pld	W	D	L	GF	GA	GD	Pts	Qualification
1	Australia	3	3	0	0	11	4	+7	9	Advance to Semi-finals
2	South Vietnam	3	2	0	1	7	2	+5	6	Advance to Semi-finals
3	New Zealand	3	1	0	2	7	11	−4	3	
4	Singapore	3	0	0	3	2	10	−8	0	

4 November 1967

South Vietnam	2–0	Singapore

5 November 1967

Australia	5–3	New Zealand

7 November 1967

South Vietnam	0–1	Australia

8 November 1967

New Zealand	3–1	Singapore

10 November 1967

South Vietnam	5–1	New Zealand

11 November 1967

Australia	5–1	Singapore

=== Group B ===
Pos	Team	Pld	W	D	L	GF	GA	GD	Pts	Qualification
1	South Korea	3	3	0	0	6	2	+4	9	Advance to Semi-finals
2	Malaysia	3	2	0	1	6	4	+2	6	Advance to Semi-finals
3	Thailand	3	1	0	2	8	7	+1	3	
4	Hong Kong	3	0	0	3	1	8	−7	0	

4 November 1967

Malaysia	3–2	Thailand

5 November 1967

South Korea	1–0	Hong Kong

7 November 1967

South Korea	3–1	Thailand

8 November 1967

Hong Kong	0–2	Malaysia

10 November 1967

Thailand	5–1	Hong Kong

11 November 1967

South Korea	2–1	Malaysia

== Knockout stage ==
Semi-finals
12 November
Australia	1
Malaysia	0
12 November
South Vietnam	0
South Korea	3

Final
14 November
Australia	3
South Korea	2
Third place
14 November
South Vietnam	4
Malaysia	1

=== Semi-finals ===
12 November 1967

Australia	1–0	Malaysia

12 November 1967

South Vietnam	0–3	South Korea

=== Third place play-off ===
14 November 1967

South Vietnam	4–1	Malaysia

=== Final ===
14 November 1967

Australia	3–2	South Korea

Attendance: 14,547
