= OFC U-16 Pacific Cup =

The Pacific Cup was a football tournament held among the Oceania Football Confederation (OFC) member nations. The first tournament was played in 2002. The last tournament was played in 2012.

The tournament involved a round-robin format where every team played each other once at the location of the tournament.

== Participating nations ==
- American Samoa
- Australia
- Cook Islands
- Fiji
- New Caledonia
- New Zealand
- Papua New Guinea
- Samoa
- Solomon Islands
- Tonga
- Vanuatu

== Results ==
Year	Host	Winner	Runner-up	3rd Place	4th Place
2002; Details	Australia	Australia	Vanuatu	Solomon Islands	New Zealand
2012; Details					

== Total Wins ==
1	Australia	2002
