= George Campbell (New Zealand footballer) =

New Zealand footballer

Personal information
- Full name: George M Campbell
- Place of birth: New Zealand
- Position: Forward

Senior career*
Years	Team	Apps	(Gls)
- Wellington Thistle

International career
1922–1923	New Zealand	6	(7)
- * Club domestic league appearances and goals

George Campbell was an association football player who represented New Zealand, playing in New Zealand's first ever official international. He was New Zealand's first national team captain.

Campbell made his full All Whites debut in New Zealand's inaugural A-international fixture, beating Australia 3–1 on 17 June 1922 and ended his international playing career with six A-international caps to his credit. Campbell scored back-to-back hat-tricks in his final two matches against Australia in June 1923, a 3–2 win and a 4–1 win, in which he scored all four.
