= Jim Kershaw =

New Zealand footballer

Personal information
- Full name: James Isaiah Kershaw
- Date of birth: 27 October 1906
- Place of birth: New Zealand
- Date of death: 27 November 1997 (aged 91)
- Place of death: New Zealand
- Positions: Centre-half; inside left

Senior career*
Years	Team	Apps	(Gls)
- Wellington Marist
1932	Seatoun		
1932–1935	Wellington Marist		

International career
1933	New Zealand	3	(4)
- * Club domestic league appearances and goals

James Isaiah Kershaw (27 October 1906 – 27 November 1997) was an association football player who represented New Zealand at international level.

== Career ==
Kershaw played three official A-international matches for the All Whites in 1933, all on tour against trans-Tasman neighbours Australia, the first a 2–4 loss on 5 June 1933, followed by a 4–6 loss and another 2–4 loss on 17 and 24 June respectively. Kershaw scored once in each of the first two games and twice in the third match for a total of 4 official international goals.

After retiring from the game, Kershaw remained involved in the administrative side of the sport. He was a manager of the NZFA representative team which toured Australia in 1954 and an overseas NZFA tour in 1964, and served on the council of the New Zealand football association for 15 years, becoming its chairman from 1959 to 1963.
