= Bill Chapman (footballer) =

New Zealand footballer

Personal information
- Full name: William A Chapman
- Place of birth: New Zealand

Senior career*
Years	Team	Apps	(Gls)
- Invercargill HSOB

International career
1933–1936	New Zealand	4	(2)
- * Club domestic league appearances and goals

William Chapman is a former association football player who represented New Zealand at international level.

Chapman scored the first of his 2 international goals on his full All Whites debut in a 2–4 loss to Australia on 5 June 1933 and played a total of four A-internationals, all against Australia, his final cap an appearance in a 1–7 loss on 4 July 1936.
