= Australia men's national soccer team =

Australia
- Nickname: Socceroos
- Association: Football Australia
- Confederation: AFC (Asia; 1973–1978, 2006–present); OFC (Oceania; 1966–1972, 1979–2005)
- Sub-confederation: AFF (Southeast Asia)
- Head coach: Tony Popovic
- Captain: Mathew Ryan
- Most caps: Mark Schwarzer (109)
- Top scorer: Tim Cahill (50)
- Home stadium: Various
- FIFA code: AUS
First colours	Second colours

FIFA ranking
- Current: 27 ▼1 (18 November 2026)
- Highest: 14 (September 2009)
- Lowest: 102 (November 2014)

First international
- New Zealand 3–1 Australia (Dunedin, New Zealand; 17 June 1922)

Biggest win
- Australia 31–0 American Samoa (Coffs Harbour, Australia; 11 April 2001) (World record for biggest win in senior international matches)

Biggest defeat
- Australia 0–8 South Africa (Adelaide, Australia; 17 September 1955)

World Cup
- Appearances: 7 (first in 1974)
- Best result: Round of 16 (2006, 2022)

Asian Cup
- Appearances: 6 (first in 2007)
- Best result: Champions (2015)

OFC Nations Cup
- Appearances: 6 (first in 1980)
- Best result: Champions (1980, 1996, 2000, 2004)

Confederations Cup
- Appearances: 4 (first in 1997)
- Best result: Runners-up (1997)
Medal record
Men's football
FIFA Confederations Cup
Silver medal – second place	1997 Saudi Arabia	Team
Bronze medal – third place	2001 Korea and Japan	Team
AFC Asian Cup
Gold medal – first place	2015 Australia	Team
Silver medal – second place	2011 Qatar	Team
OFC Nations Cup
Gold medal – first place	1980 New Caledonia	Team
Gold medal – first place	1996 No Host	Team
Gold medal – first place	2000 Tahiti	Team
Gold medal – first place	2004 Australia	Team
Silver medal – second place	1998 Australia	Team
Silver medal – second place	2002 New Zealand	Team
AFC–OFC Challenge Cup
Silver medal – second place	2001 Japan	Team
- Website: socceroos.com.au

The Australia men's national soccer team represents Australia in international men's soccer. Officially nicknamed the Socceroos, the team is controlled by the governing body for soccer in Australia, Football Australia, which is affiliated with the Asian Football Confederation (AFC) and the regional ASEAN Football Federation (AFF).

The team played its first match in 1922 and originally participated in the Oceania Football Confederation (OFC) from 1966 to 1972, before moving to the AFC from 1973 to 1978 and back to the OFC from 1979 to 2005. In this confederation, Australia won the OFC Nations Cup four times between 1980 and 2004, and dominated many FIFA World Cup qualification campaigns during earlier rounds. The team won 31–0 against the American Samoa national football team in a FIFA World Cup qualification match, achieving the world record for the largest victory in a senior international match. Despite this, the team only managed to qualify for the FIFA World Cup twice in 11 attempts while in this confederation, because Oceania's single qualification berth always led to an intercontinental playoff, which did not guarantee straight qualification.

In a bid to improve its competitiveness, the team returned to the AFC in 2006, finishing the AFC Asian Cup as runners-up in 2011 and winning in 2015 as hosts. This victory made Australia the only team in the world to win two different confederation cups. Since switching confederations, the team has maintained a perfect qualification record for the World Cup, earning five consecutive spots for a total of seven appearances. Australia has reached the World Cup knockout stages three times, advancing to this round in 2006, 2022 and 2026. Despite its AFF membership, Australia currently does not contest the ASEAN Championship due to a mutual agreement, though it does compete in youth iterations.

The team additionally represented Australia at the now-defunct FIFA Confederations Cup four times, winning a silver and bronze medal in 1997 and 2001 respectively. Mark Schwarzer has the most caps for Australia, with 109 to his name, while Tim Cahill has the most goals scored, with 50. Australia initially developed a rivalry with New Zealand and an intercontinental rivalry with Uruguay, and, after returning to the AFC, has developed a rivalry with Japan.

== History ==
=== Early years ===
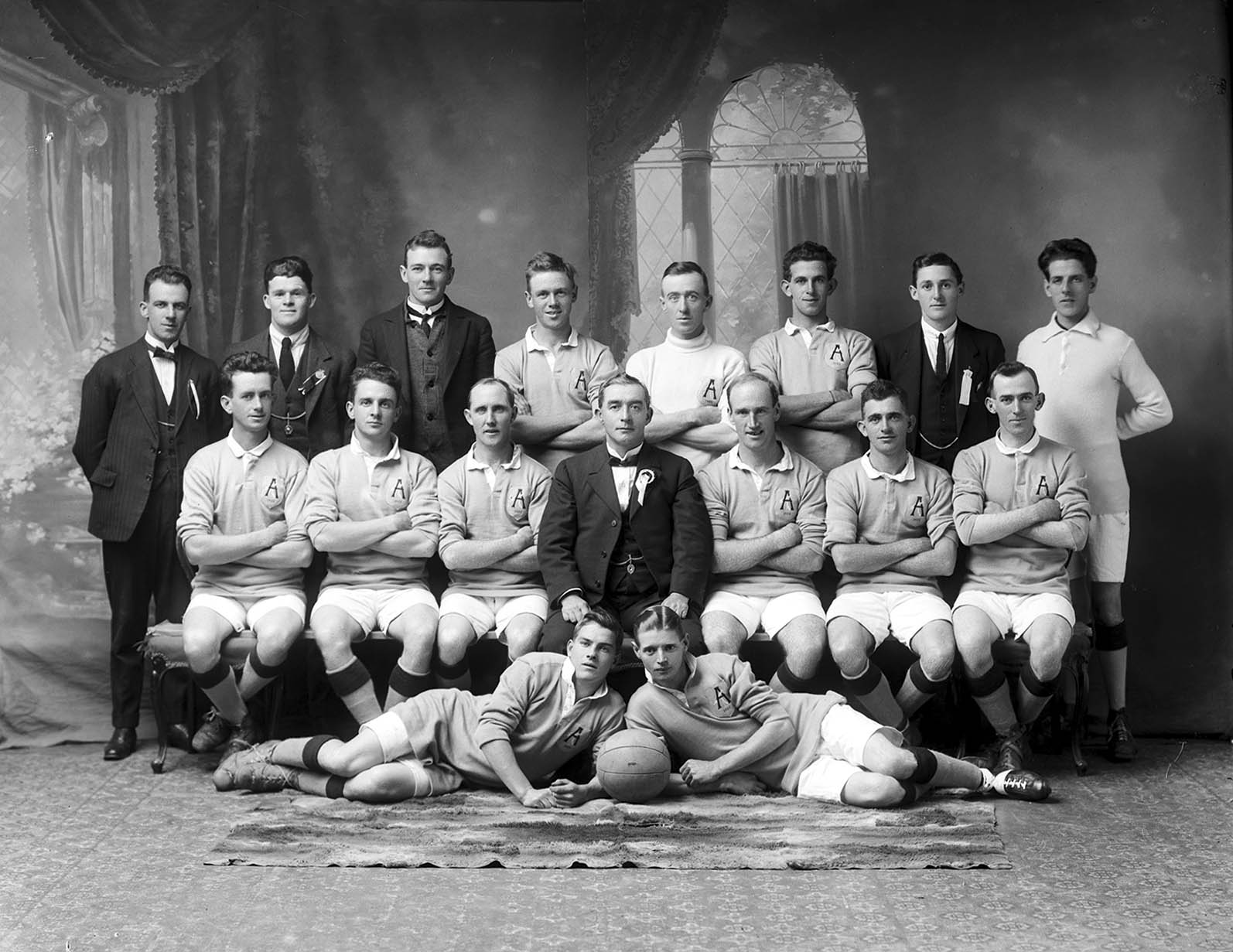
The first Australia soccer team (wearing light blue shirts) of 1922

The first Australia national team was constituted in 1922 for a tour of New Zealand, which included two defeats and a draw. For the next 36 years, Australia, New Zealand and South Africa became regular opponents in tour (exhibition) matches. During that period, Australia also competed against Canada and India during their tours of Australia in 1924 and 1938 respectively. Australia recorded their worst ever defeat on 30 June 1951 as they lost 17–0 in a match to a touring England side. The country had a rare opportunity to compete on the world's stage during the team's first major international tournament as hosts of the 1956 Melbourne Olympics. However, an inexperienced squad proved to be reason for the team's disappointing performance, including a 4–2 loss to India in the quarterfinals. With the advent of cheap air travel, Australia began to diversify its range of opponents, but its geographical isolation continued to play a role in its destiny for the next 30 years. Australia won the 1967 South Vietnam Independence Cup against seven other nations, but this gained little recognition domestically.

After failing to qualify for the FIFA World Cup in 1966 and 1970, losing in play-offs to North Korea and Israel respectively, Australia finally appeared at their first World Cup in West Germany in 1974. After managing only a draw with Chile and losses to East Germany and eventual champions West Germany, the team, which was made up of mostly amateur players, was eliminated at the end of the first round, finishing last in their group without scoring a goal. It would prove to be the only appearance for the Australian team until the World Cup returned to Germany more than three decades later in 2006. Over a 40-year period, the Australian team was known for its near misses in its attempts to qualify for the World Cup; they lost play-offs in 1966 to North Korea, 1970 to Israel, 1986 to Scotland, 1994 to Argentina, 1998 to Iran and 2002 to Uruguay.

=== First successes and "golden generation" ===
While World Cup qualification eluded the team between 1974 and 2006, Australia produced some notable performances against strong European and South American sides. In 1988, Australia defeated reigning world champions Argentina 4–1 in the Australian Bicentennial Gold Cup. In 1997, Australia drew with reigning world champions Brazil 0–0 in the group stage and then defeated Uruguay 1–0 in the semi-finals to reach the 1997 FIFA Confederations Cup final.

In 2001, after a victory against reigning world champions France in the group stage, Australia finished the 2001 FIFA Confederations Cup in third place after defeating Brazil 1–0 in the third-place match. Australia defeated England 3–1 at West Ham United's Boleyn Ground in 2003 as Wayne Rooney made his international debut.

In early 2005, it was reported that Football Australia had entered into discussions to join the Asian Football Confederation (AFC) and end an almost 40-year association with the Oceania Football Confederation (OFC). Many commentators and fans, including soccer broadcaster and former Australian captain Johnny Warren (deceased in 2004), felt that the only way for Australia to progress was to abandon Oceania. On 13 March, the AFC executive committee made a unanimous decision to invite Australia to join the AFC. After the OFC executive committee unanimously endorsed Australia's proposed move, FIFA approved the move on 30 June 2005. Australia joined Asia, with the move taking effect on 1 January 2006, though until then, Australia had to compete for a 2006 FIFA World Cup position as an OFC member country.

After a successful campaign, the team took the first steps towards qualification for the 2006 World Cup. After coach Frank Farina stood down from the position after Australia's dismal performance at the 2005 FIFA Confederations Cup, Guus Hiddink was announced as the new national coach. Australia, ranked 49th, would then have to play the 18th ranked Uruguay in a rematch of the 2001 qualification play-off for a spot in the 2006 FIFA World Cup. After a 5–0 friendly win against Jamaica, the first leg of the play-off tournament was lost (1–0), with the return leg still to be played in Australia four days later in Sydney on 16 November 2005.

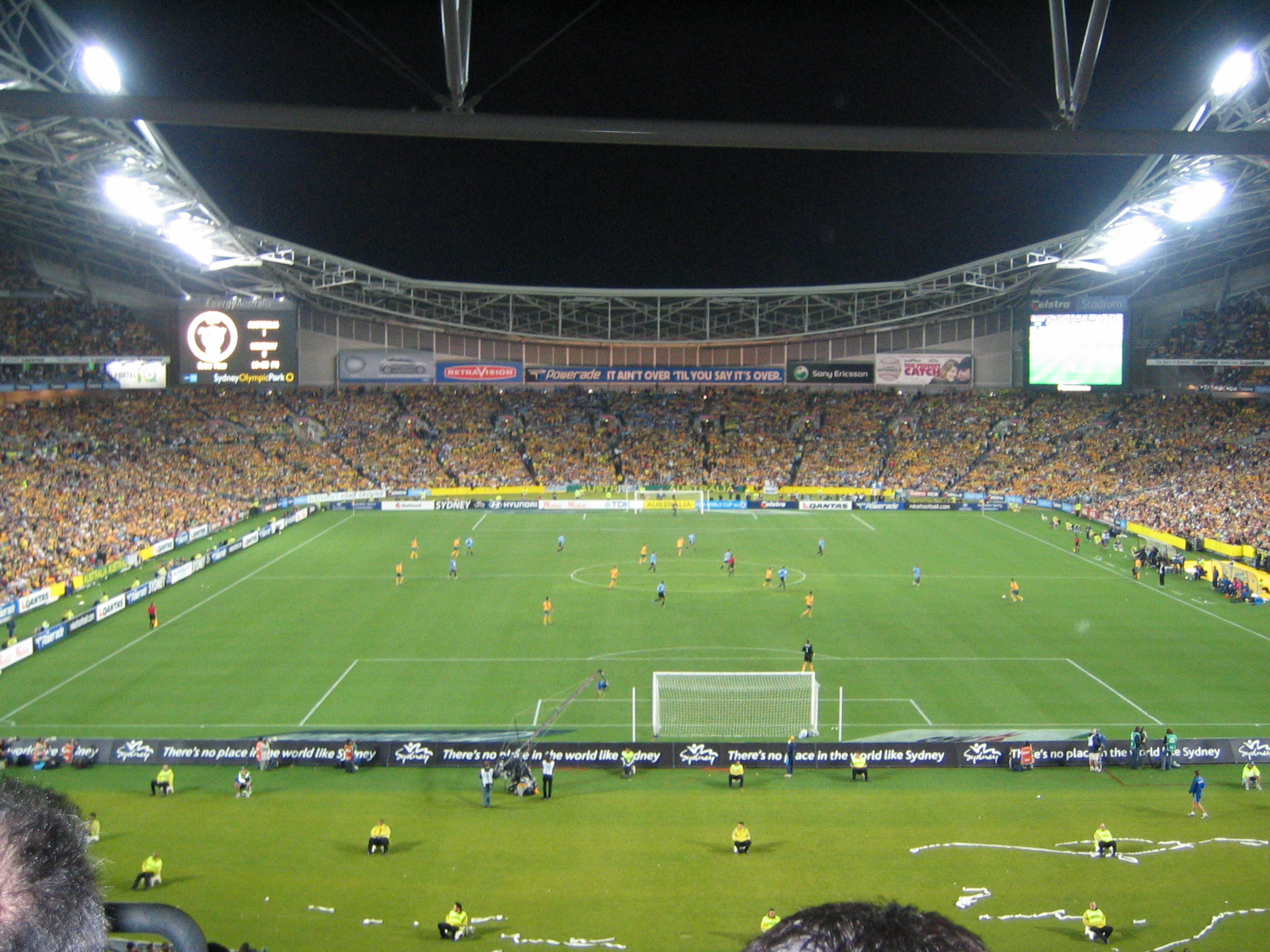
Australia playing Uruguay at Stadium Australia to determine the last qualifying spot for the 2006 FIFA World Cup.

The second leg of the qualifying play-off was played in front of a crowd of 82,698 at Stadium Australia. Australia led Uruguay 1–0 after 90 minutes following a goal by Mark Bresciano in the first half. The aggregate was tied, and extra time was played. Neither team scored after two periods of extra time, bringing the game to a penalty shootout. Australia won the penalty shootout 4–2, making them the first-ever team to qualify for a World Cup via a penalty shootout. Australian goalkeeper Mark Schwarzer made two saves, with John Aloisi scoring the winning penalty for a place in the World Cup, Australia's first qualification in 32 years.

Australia went into the 2006 World Cup as the second lowest-ranked side. Although their ranking vastly improved in subsequent months after a series of exhibition matches against high-profile teams, including a 1–1 draw against the Netherlands, and a 1–0 win at the sold-out 100,000 capacity Melbourne Cricket Ground against the then European champions Greece for the 2006 World Cup, Australia was placed into Group F, along with Japan, Croatia and defending champions Brazil. In their opening group game, Australia defeated Japan 3–1, with Tim Cahill scoring two goals (84', 89') and John Aloisi scoring one (90+2') in the last eight minutes. The goals were the first ever scored by Australia's men's soccer team in a World Cup and it was also the first victory of an Oceanian team in the tournament's history, as well as all three goals being scored in the last seven minutes of the game, which was never before done in a World Cup match. Australia met Brazil in their second group game, which Australia lost to Brazil 2–0. The Socceroos faced Croatia in their third match. The final score (2–2) was enough to see Australia proceed to the round of 16, where they were eliminated from the competition after a 1–0 defeat by the eventual champions Italy after conceding a controversial penalty in the 93rd minute. The loss marked the official end of Hiddink's tenure as Australia's national coach. The success achieved at the 2006 World Cup later saw the team named AFC National Team of the Year, as well as being dubbed the "golden generation" in the history of the Socceroos.

=== Later success ===
Led by coach Graham Arnold, Australia went to their first AFC Asian Cup in 2007, sending a strong squad which included 15 players from the previous year's World Cup team. In Group A they played against Oman (a 1–1 draw), Thailand (a 4–0 win) and eventual champions Iraq (a 3–1 loss), assuring Australia's progression to the quarter-final stage of the tournament. After drawing 1–1 with Japan with 120 minutes played, Australia exited the tournament on penalties at the quarter-final stage. An international friendly on 11 September 2007 against Argentina (a 1–0 loss) was Graham Arnold's last game as head coach, with the position eventually being filled by Pim Verbeek on 6 December 2007.

Australia began their 2010 FIFA World Cup campaign in the third round of qualification, drawn into a group consisting of Qatar, Iraq and China PR, in which Australia finished first. Australia eventually saw progression through to the tournament in South Africa after comfortably winning the fourth round of qualification in a group consisting of Japan, Bahrain, Qatar and Uzbekistan. Australia's qualification was already assured before the final two games, finally topping its group ahead of Japan by five points.

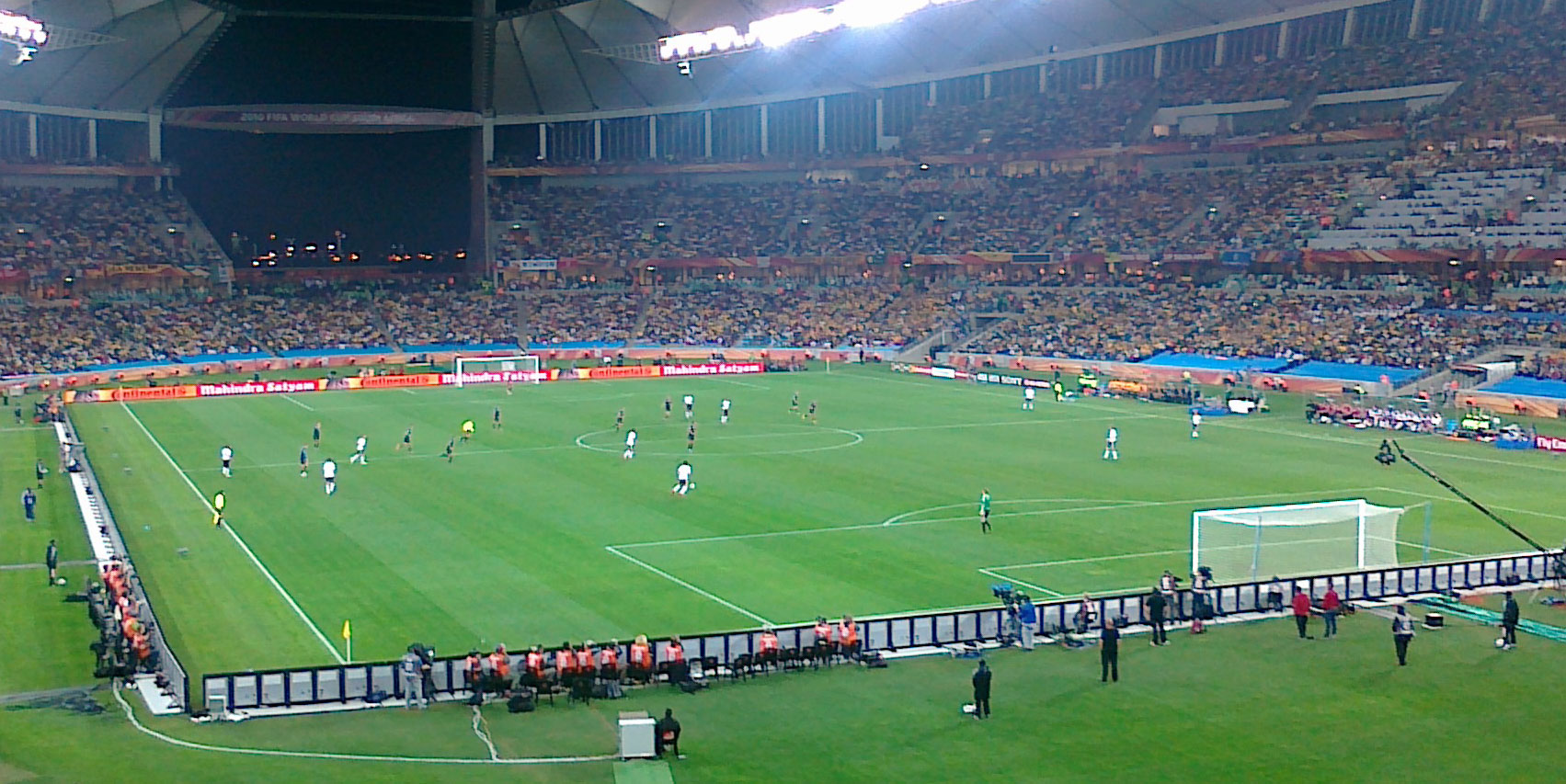
Australia against Germany in Moses Mabhida Stadium, at the 2010 FIFA World Cup

Australia was drawn into Group D in the World Cup, which featured three-time world champion Germany, Ghana and Serbia. On 14 June, Australia faced Germany. Pim Verbeek's surprising decision to play without a recognised striker saw Australia comprehensively defeated 4–0. Verbeek received heavy criticism for his tactics, with SBS (Australia's World Cup broadcaster) chief soccer analyst Craig Foster calling for his immediate sacking. Australia's second group match against Ghana resulted in a 1–1 draw, and their third and final group match against Serbia resulted in a 2–1 win. Ultimately, Australia were eliminated on goal difference behind Ghana. Pim Verbeek completed his term as Australian coach at the end of the 2010 World Cup and was soon replaced by Holger Osieck.

In 2010, Australia qualified for their second AFC Asian Cup, topping their qualification group. A successful campaign at the 2011 Asian Cup saw Australia become runners-up to Japan, after losing in the Final 1–0 in extra time.

In 2012, Australia agreed to compete in the East Asian Cup. Australia travelled to Hong Kong to compete in a series of qualification matches with the hopes of qualifying for the 2013 East Asian Cup. Despite handing several debuts and fielding an in-experienced squad, Australia was successful, finishing ahead of Hong Kong, North Korea, Guam and Chinese Taipei to progress to the 2013 East Asian Cup, where Australia eventually finished last behind Japan, South Korea and China PR. On 26 August 2013, Australia became full members of the ASEAN Football Federation but as part of their entrance agreement with the sub-confederation, their national team is barred from participating in the AFF Championship due to their perceived wide gap in playing standards between Australia and the rest of the region.

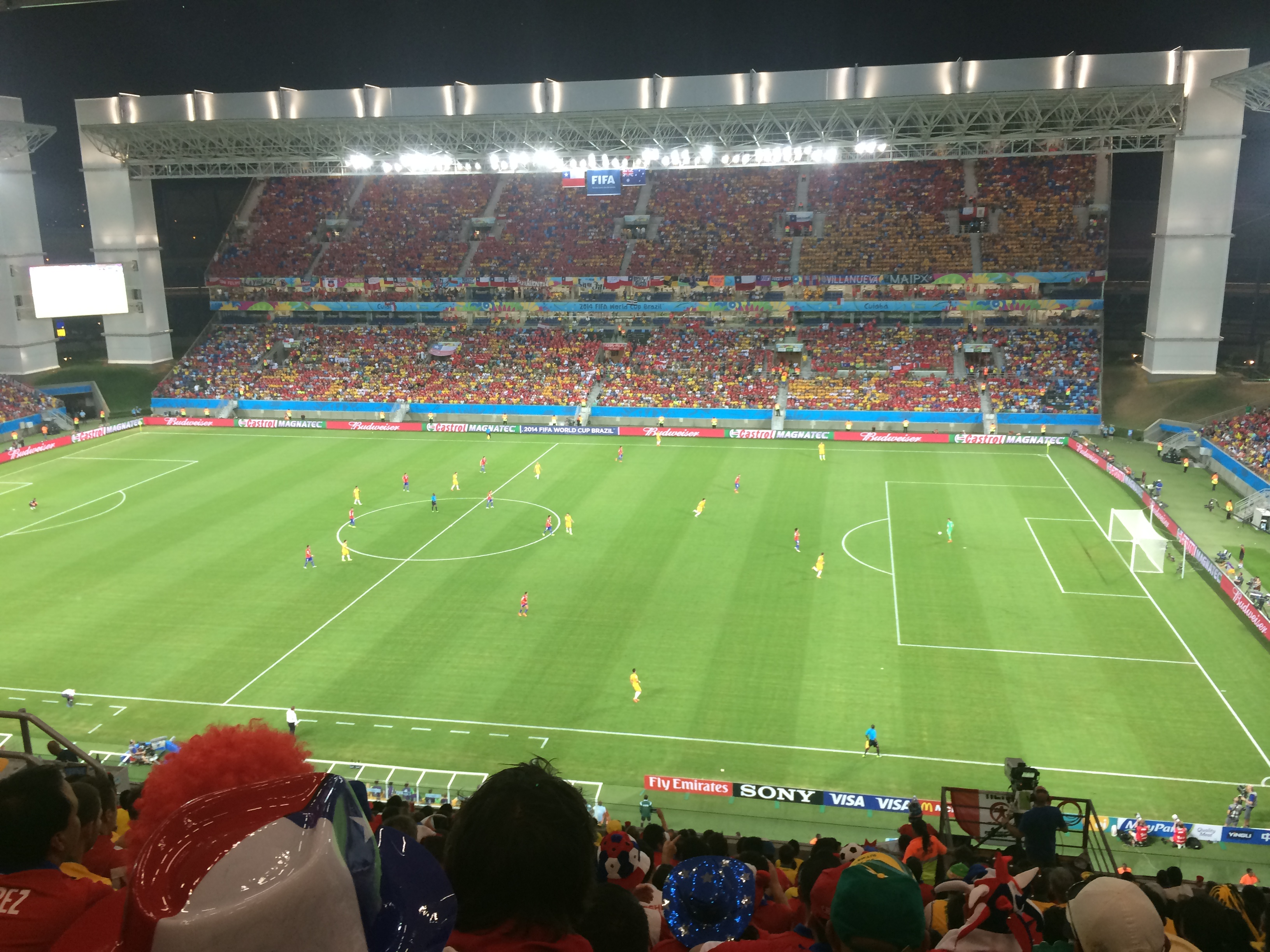
Australia against Chile in Arena Pantanal, Cuiabá, at the 2014 FIFA World Cup.

Australia's 2014 FIFA World Cup qualification campaign began with a series of friendlies against the United Arab Emirates (0–0), Germany (a 2–1 win), New Zealand (a 3–0 win), Serbia (0–0) and Wales (a 2–1 win). Australia's World Cup campaign started in the third round of qualification, with Australia topping their group to progress to the fourth round. After winning their last fourth round-game, Australia finished as runners-up in their group, qualifying for the finals tournament in Brazil on 18 June 2013.

Shortly after achieving qualification to the World Cup, Australia played a series of friendly matches against Brazil and France, suffering consecutive 6–0 defeats. This along with previous poor performances during the 2014 World Cup qualification campaign resulted in manager Holger Osieck's sacking, bringing his three-year tenure as Australia's manager to an end.

=== New generation: the 2015 AFC Asian Cup triumph ===
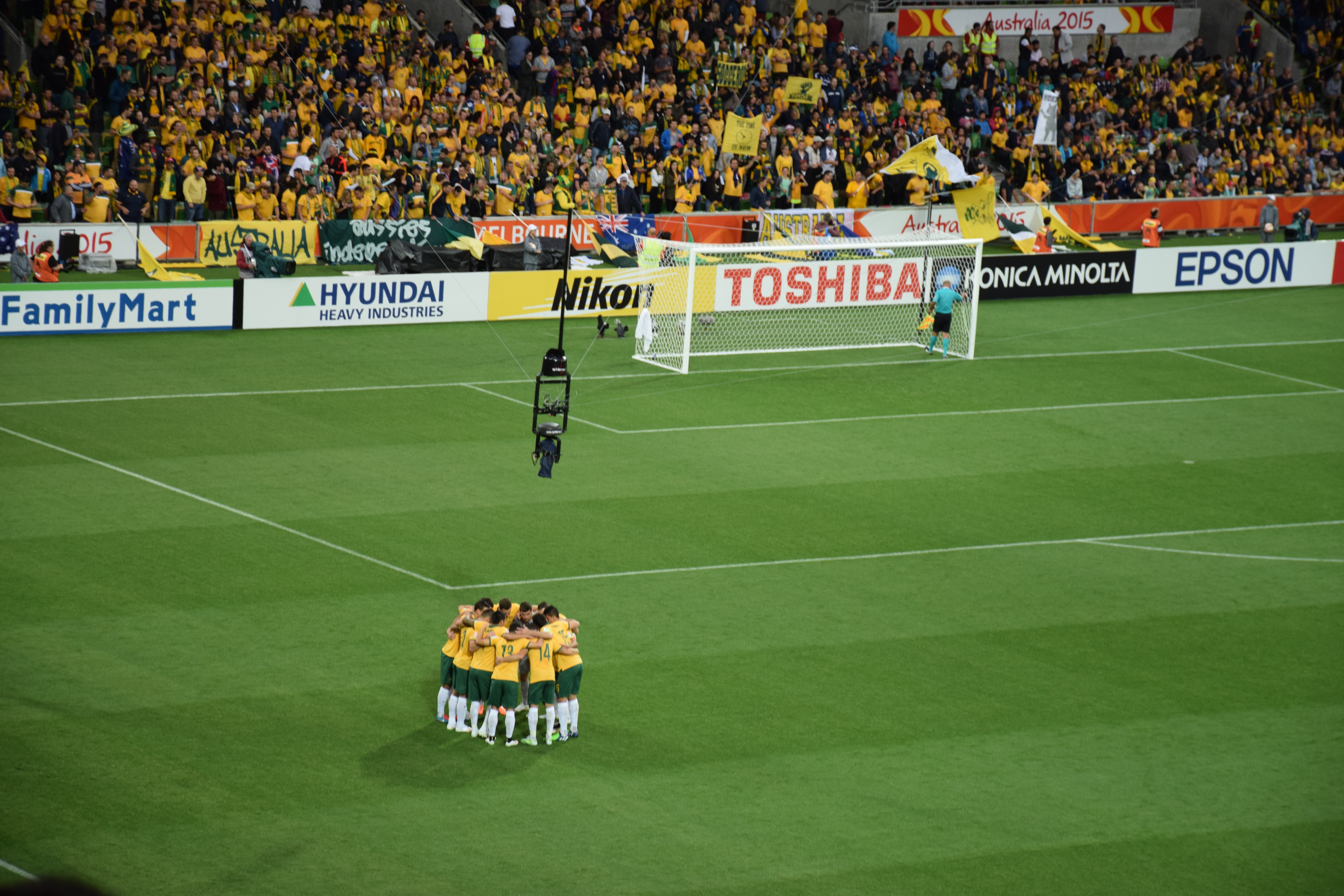
Australia match against Kuwait in 2015 AFC Asian Cup opening match

After a two-week search for a new manager, Ange Postecoglou was eventually appointed in the position. Postecoglou was tasked with regenerating the Australian national team, which was deemed to have been too reliant on members of their Golden Generation of 2006, subsequently leading to a stagnation of results, culminating in successive 6–0 defeats to Brazil and France. In his first game as Australia's manager, a home friendly match against Costa Rica, Australia won 1–0 courtesy of a goal from Tim Cahill.

At the World Cup, Australia were drawn in Group B alongside defending world champions Spain, 2010 runners-up Netherlands and Chile. Their first match was off to a lacklustre start, having conceded two goals in the opening 15 minutes from Alexis Sánchez and Jorge Valdivia. Despite a goal from Tim Cahill that inspired a late resurgence from Postecoglou's team, they ultimately lost to Chile 3–1. Their second match against the Netherlands was a close one, with the Socceroos giving up a 2–1 lead, eventually resulting in a 3–2 loss, thus earning their early exit along with the Spanish. In the end, Australia finished Group B with a third consecutive defeat to Spain, 3–0. Australia's competitive World Cup performances in a difficult group led to believe that a new Golden Generation was about to begin.

In their first international match after the World Cup, Australia played 2014 quarter-finalists Belgium in Liège, with Australia going down 2–0. Four days later, Australia achieved their first international win in ten months, and just their second win under Ange Postecoglou, with a 3–2 victory over Saudi Arabia in London. After drawing against the United Arab Emirates, and suffering successive losses against Qatar and Japan, combined with previous poor results earlier in the year, Australia slipped to 94 and 102 in the FIFA World Rankings, their lowest-ever ranking.

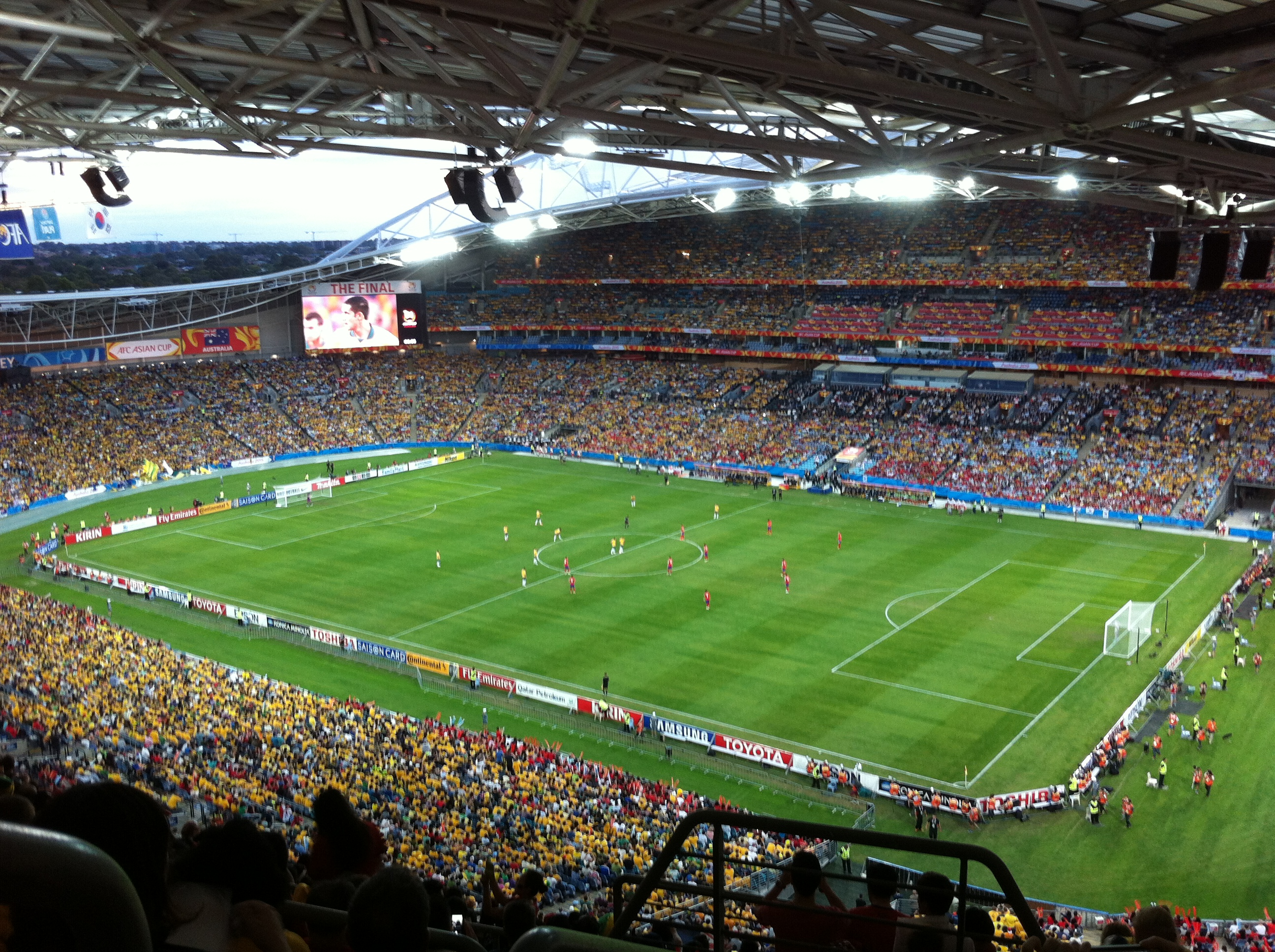
Australia playing in the 2015 AFC Asian Cup final where they would go on to lift the cup after defeating South Korea 2–1 in extra time

The new year saw Australia host the 2015 AFC Asian Cup, with the team making their third consecutive appearance in the tournament. Australia won their first two group matches against Kuwait and Oman comfortably, with scorelines of 4–1 and 4–0 respectively. This guaranteed their qualification for the knockout stage, despite losing their final group match against South Korea in Brisbane 1–0. They faced China PR in the quarter-finals and won 2–0, courtesy of a second-half brace from Tim Cahill. In the semi-finals, Australia won 2–0 over the United Arab Emirates and advanced to the final for the second time in a row. They faced South Korea in the final on 31 January at Stadium Australia, winning 2–1 after extra time to claim their first Asian title and qualify for the 2017 FIFA Confederations Cup.

After Australia qualified for the 2018 FIFA World Cup in November 2017, Ange Postecoglou resigned from his position as coach; and former manager of the Netherlands national team, Bert van Marwijk, was subsequently appointed as his replacement. On 8 March 2018, after van Marwijk's first squad announcement, the FFA announced that Graham Arnold will take the coaching role from after the 2018 World Cup until the 2022 World Cup.

With van Marwijk, Australia was grouped with Denmark, France and Peru. The Socceroos' first group match against eventual world champions France was praised by a valiant effort, in which Australia only lost 1–2 by a virtual own goal from Aziz Behich. After the defeat to France, Australia produced another outstanding performance, drawing Denmark 1–1. However, in the crucial match against already eliminated Peru, Australia lost 0–2 and crashed out from the World Cup with only a point, becoming the only team from the AFC to be winless in the 2018 World Cup. Subsequently, van Marwijk left his post and Arnold replaced him as the new coach of the Socceroos.

Under Graham Arnold, Australia started their 2019 AFC Asian Cup in hope of defending the title, being grouped with Jordan, Syria and Palestine, but their hope was shattered by a shocking 0–1 defeat to Jordan. Australia soon returned to the race by beating Palestine 3–0 before winning an important encounter with a hard-fought 3–2 win over Syria, eliminating both Palestine and Syria in the process. The win gave Australia to qualify for the round of sixteen, where they overcame Uzbekistan after winning on penalties 4–2, having drawn 0–0 for 120 minutes. In the quarter-finals, however, in the Hazza bin Zayed Stadium, where Australia had lost their opening match against Jordan, Australia once again failed to register a win in the same ground, losing to the host United Arab Emirates 0–1 due to a mistake from Miloš Degenek, eventually failing to defend the title.

=== 2022 FIFA World Cup resurgence ===
Australia took part in the 2022 FIFA World Cup qualification, which they entered in the second round, in which they faced Kuwait, Jordan, Nepal and Chinese Taipei. Australia dominated the group with eight wins out of eight to reach the third round, where it faced Saudi Arabia, Japan, China, Oman and Vietnam. After a start with three straight wins over China, Vietnam and Oman, Australia then won only one game, against Vietnam, in their final seven matches, being held thrice and losing three more, finishing third in the group. It then had to rely on fourth round playoffs. Due to the COVID-19 pandemic, all of Australia's playoffs were centralised in Doha. The Socceroos began their quest with a 2–1 win over the United Arab Emirates, to face fifth place CONMEBOL qualification finisher Peru, a rematch of the 2018 FIFA World Cup. This time around, Australia held Peru goalless, before winning on penalties to qualify for the FIFA World Cup in Qatar.

Australia was drawn in group D along with France, Denmark and Tunisia. Australia's qualification also meant that the Asian confederation had the largest number of teams in their FIFA World Cup history, with six countries qualifying.

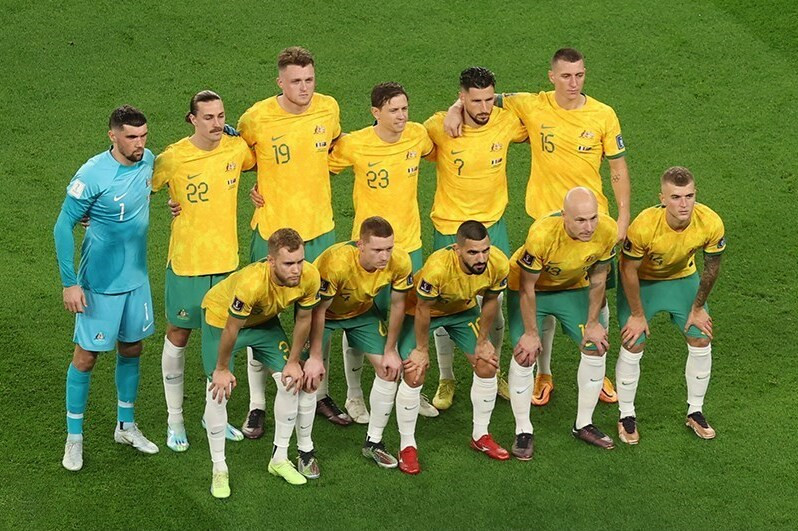
Australia before their match against France in the 2022 FIFA World Cup opening match

As preparation for the 2022 FIFA World Cup, Australia played two friendlies against neighbouring New Zealand, winning both games. It began its World Cup quest on 23 November against France, losing 4–1 after initially taking the lead with goal from Craig Goodwin. Three days later Australia registered its first World Cup win since 2010, overcoming Tunisia with a header from Mitchell Duke to seal a 1–0 win, sending Australia from bottom to second place. Four days later, against UEFA Euro 2020 semi-finalists Denmark, Australia won 1–0, thanks to a Mathew Leckie goal. Australia finished the group stage in second place behind France on goal difference, making Australia the first Asian representative to reach the knockout stage in Qatar 2022. Australia's resurgence in the group stage was widely watched and followed by Australian supporters. Mass celebrations occurred after the upsets over Tunisia and Denmark, and Prime Minister Anthony Albanese called the achievement "magnificent". In the round of 16, Australia lost 2–1 to Argentina, with Lionel Messi opening the scoring and Julián Álvarez getting the second after dispossessing Mathew Ryan. Australia pulled one back when Goodwin's shot deflected into goal off Enzo Fernández and Garang Kuol almost scored the equaliser in injury time, but his shot was smothered by Argentinian goalkeeper Emiliano Martínez.

=== 2026 World Cup qualification ===
On 20 September 2024, Graham Arnold announced he was stepping down as head coach, two games into the third round of 2026 FIFA World Cup qualifying. The Socceroos had only picked up one point from two matches. On 23 September 2024, Football Australia's James Johnson announced that Tony Popovic had been appointed as head coach. Popovic led the Socceroos to wins over Japan and Saudi Arabia, and Australia eventually ensured direct qualification to the FIFA World Cup for the first time since 2014, and their sixth consecutive World Cup appearance.

Australia played their first match of the 2026 FIFA World Cup against Turkey on 13 June 2026. The match was played at BC Place, Vancouver, British Columbia. Goals from Nestory Irankunda and Connor Metcalfe, as well as a clean sheet and eight saves from surprise starting goalkeeper, Patrick Beach, sealed an upset 2-0 victory for Australia.

== Team image ==
=== Media coverage ===
Australian matches are broadcast by Paramount+ and on free-to-air by Network 10 until 2028, with the exception during the FIFA World Cup finals tournament matches that still aired live and free on SBS.

Previous coverage has been provided by Fox Sports until 2021.

The national team has set multiple ratings records for both subscription and free-to-air television. Australia's final 2006 FIFA World Cup qualifying match against Uruguay was the highest rating program in SBS history with an audience of 3.4 million viewers, while a 2010 World Cup qualifying match against Uzbekistan set a record for the highest subscription television audience, with an average of 431,000 viewers. The 2015 AFC Asian Cup final against South Korea had a total reach of 5.3 million Australians overall.

=== Kit ===
For the 2026 FIFA World Cup, the home shirt is mostly gold, with green accents including around the neck and underarm/sides. The logos and player numbers are also in green. The home shorts are a light to dark green gradient, with logos and numbers in gold. The home socks are white. The away kit is mostly blue-green with a gradient into coral at the shoulder level, and the logos and player numbers are white. The away shorts and socks are the same blue-green colour. There is also white ribbing on both home and away kits.

The previous Socceroos kit from 2025 was designed by Reko Rennie, a First Nations artist. This kit is still used across Australia's other national football teams, including the Matildas. The home shirt is predominantly yellow and light green chevron patterning. The shorts are a solid dark green, along with the collar, side, and cuffs of the shirt. They are usually worn with white socks. The away kit is predominantly black, with a light green collar and cuffs on the shirt. It is also adorned with pink and green chevron patterning on its sides.

Australia's jersey traditionally features the coat of arms of Australia over the left breast, however the fan replica versions show a slightly modified version with the Football Australia logo rather than the shield.

Australia's first national kit, 1922

Australia's first kit was sky blue with a maroon hoop on the socks, the colours representing the states of New South Wales and Queensland, a look that was reminiscent of the Australian national rugby league team's strips of the period. They wore the predominantly light blue kit until 1924 when they changed to green and gold, Australia's national colours.

Australia has worn a yellow jersey, usually accompanied by green shorts, and yellow socks since the 1960s. The colour of the socks altered throughout the 1970s, 1980s, and 1990s from white to the same green as the shorts to the same yellow colour as the jersey. The team first wore the traditional green and yellow colours in 1924.

Australia's kits have been produced by manufacturers including Umbro, Adidas, KingRoo, and since 2004 by Nike. Australia's 1974 World Cup kits were produced by Adidas as were all other national team kits in the tournament, with Adidas sponsoring the event. The kits, however, contained Umbro branding, due to the manufacturer's Australian partnership at the time. Nike renewed the kit manufacturer deal with FFA for another 11 years in 2012, handing them the rights to make national team kits until 2022. In the lead-up to the 2014 World Cup, the new kits to be worn by the team were revealed. The design of the new kits included a plain yellow shirt with a green collar, plain dark green shorts and white socks, a tribute to the 1974 Socceroos. Inside the back of the neck also had woven the quote, "We Socceroos can do the impossible", from Peter Wilson, the captain of the 1974 Australian team. This kit was well received. In March 2016, FFA revealed the new Socceroos kit, which featured a yellow jersey, yellow shorts and green socks. This was reportedly in accordance with a FIFA directive, instructing all national teams to have matching shirts and shorts. This kit was met with wide public contention, primarily due to the colour change of the shorts from the traditional green to yellow.

==== Kit suppliers ====
Kit supplier	Period	Notes
(United Kingdom) Umbro	1974–1983	1974 FIFA World Cup jerseys were manufactured by Adidas but featured an Umbro logo.
(Germany) Adidas	1983–1989	
(Australia) Kingroo	1990–1993	
(Belgium) Patrick	1993	
(Germany) Adidas	1993–2004	
(United States) Nike	2004–present	The partnership is in place until 2033.

=== Nickname ===
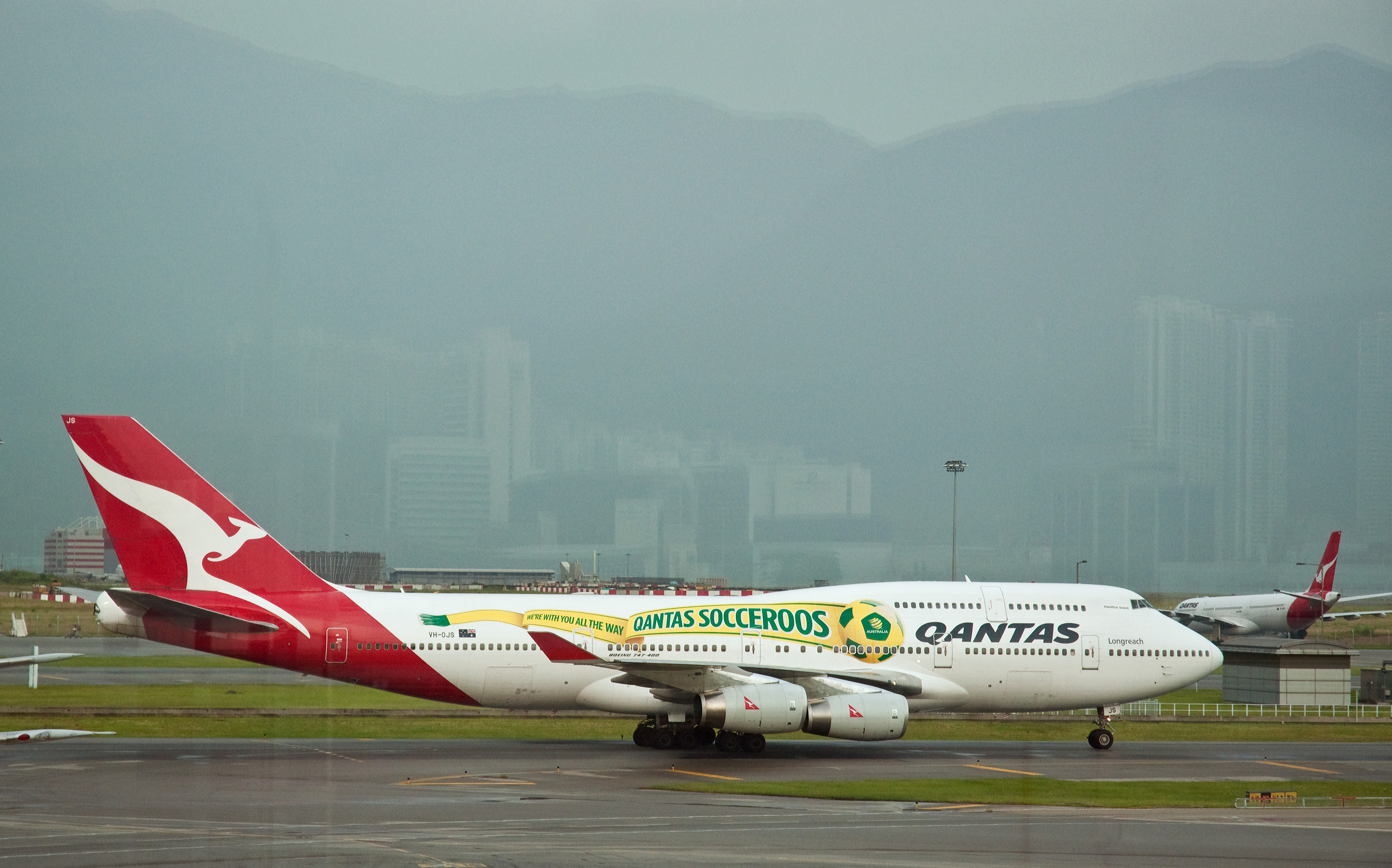
Socceroos livery on a Qantas Boeing 747–400

Australia's nickname, "Socceroos", was coined in 1967 by Sydney journalist Tony Horstead in his coverage of the team on a goodwill tour to South Vietnam during the Vietnam War. It is commonly used by both the Australian people and the governing body, the FFA. The nickname represents a cultural propensity for the use of colloquialisms in the country. It also represents the Australian English use of the sport's name.

The name itself is similar to most other Australian national representative sporting team nicknames; used informally when referring to the team, in the media or in conversation. Similarly, the name is derived from a well-known symbol of Australia, in this case, the kangaroo. The words soccer and kangaroo are combined into a portmanteau word as soccer-roo; such as Olyroos for the Australia Olympic soccer team or Hockeyroos for the Australian national women's hockey team.

=== Underdog mentality ===
As is the case with many national sports teams from Australia, the Socceroos and their supporters tend to embrace the underdog status when facing opposition that is perceived by onlookers to be a higher quality opponent that should defeat the Australians. The underdog mentality is considered a defining characteristic of the Australian national soccer team and there have been numerous famous examples of the Socceroos pulling off upset wins that were inspired by being underestimated by opposition players, coaches, fans or the media.

In February 2003, England coach Sven Goran-Eriksson had announced in the lead up to a friendly match against the Socceroos that he would rest his star players including David Beckham, Michael Owen, Frank Lampard, Steven Gerrard and Paul Scholes at half-time, which the Australians considered disrespectful. The Aussies would shock England by scoring twice in the first half while England remained scoreless with their full strength team on the park and the game ended in a 3–1 win for the Socceroos in what would be considered one of Australia's greatest ever international victories.

In November 2005, Uruguyan star striker Álvaro Recoba stated that Uruguay had a "divine right" to play in the FIFA World Cup ahead of the Socceroos when asked to comment on the upcoming second leg of the 2006 FIFA World Cup qualification inter-confederation play-off with Australia. Despite leading the play-off after a 1–0 win in the first leg, Uruguay would lose the second leg match 1–0 and would ultimately lose the subsequent penalty shootout 4–2 that sent Australia through to its first World Cup appearance in 32 years.

In June 2026, Turkish captain Hakan Çalhanoğlu stated that he believed Turkey would "dominate" Australia in their Group D match at the 2026 FIFA World Cup because they "have more qualities and a more talented team". Turkish star Arda Güler was then overheard telling his teammates "we are much better" than the Socceroos in the tunnel as the two teams were about to run out for the match. Australia would defeat the highly fancied Turkey team 2–0 in the match in one of its best ever World Cup performances and goalscorer Nestory Irankunda revealed post-match that they used the pre-match comments from the Turkish players as motivation and stated that "they did their talking, but they couldn’t back it up on the field."

=== Naming rights and sponsorship ===
The team has been branded the "CommBank Socceroos" since 1 September 2025, after Commonwealth Bank (who also have the naming rights for the women's national team) took over the naming rights from restaurant chain Subway, whose previous deal started in 2022.

Previously, they were known as the "Caltex Socceroos" under the sponsorship of Caltex Australia from 2017 to 2019. During the 2018 FIFA World Cup, some of Caltex's service stations were re-branded as "Cahilltex" as a nod to Socceroos player Tim Cahill.

Football Australia has been sponsored by Qantas as its official airline since 2004.

=== Rivalries ===
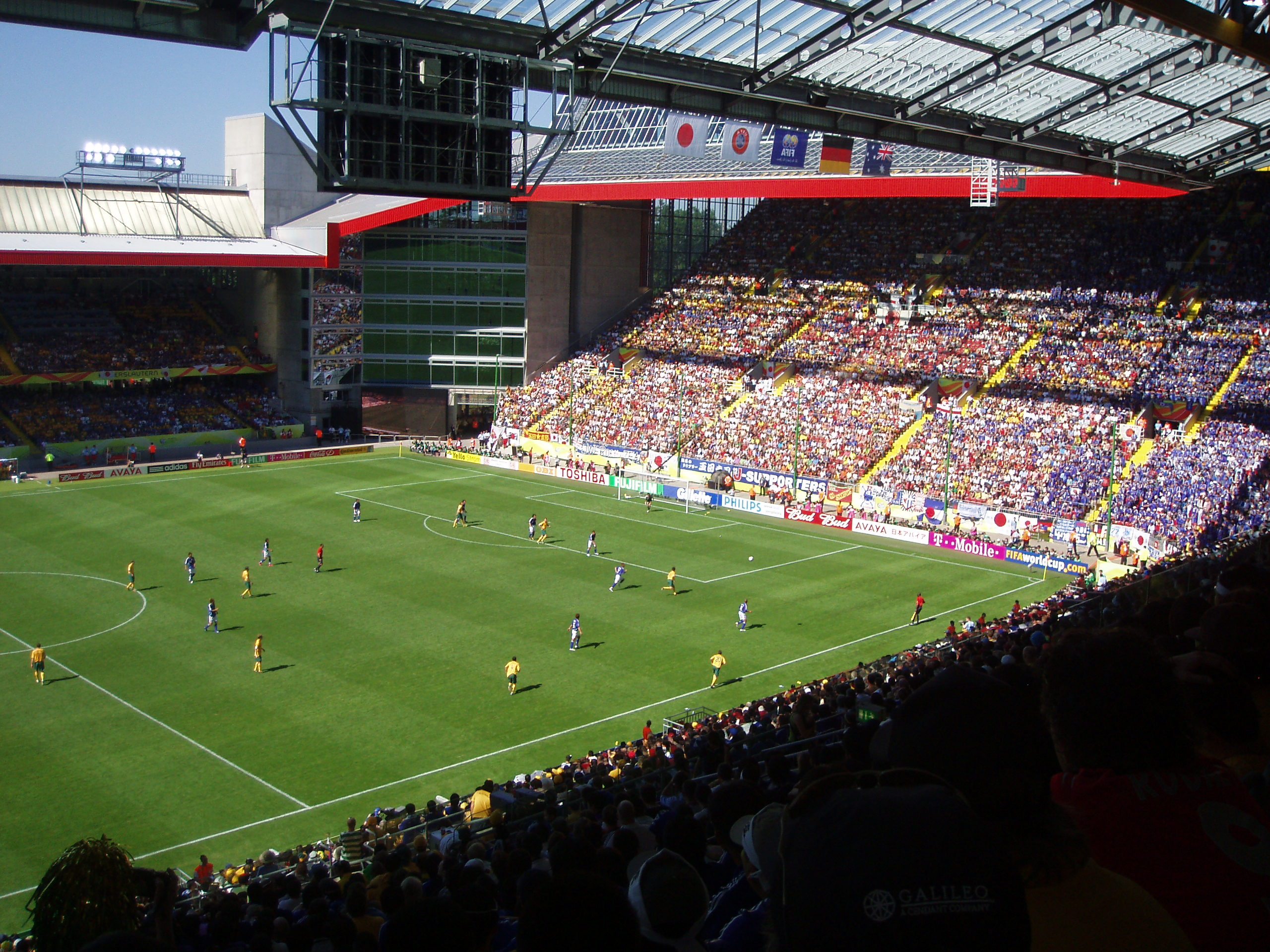
One of the matches of the 2006 World Cup was a group stage match between Australia and Japan at Fritz-Walter-Stadion in Kaiserslautern, Germany.

==== New Zealand ====
Australia's longtime rivals are trans-Tasman neighbours New Zealand. The two teams' history dates back to 1922, where they first met in both their international debuts. The rivalry between the Socceroos and the All Whites (New Zealand) is part of a wider friendly rivalry between the neighbours Australia and New Zealand, which applies not only to sport but to the culture of the two countries. The rivalry was intensified when Australia and New Zealand were both members of the OFC, regularly competing in OFC Nations Cup finals and in FIFA World Cup qualifications, where only one team from the OFC progressed to the World Cup. Since Australia joined the AFC in 2006, competition between the two teams has been infrequent, with the occasional match still receiving much media and public attention.

==== Japan ====
After joining the AFC, Australia began to develop a fierce rivalry with fellow Asian powerhouse Japan. The rivalry began at the 2006 FIFA World Cup, where the two countries were grouped together. The rivalry continued with the two countries meeting regularly in various AFC competitions, including the 2011 Asian Cup final and qualification for the 2010, 2014, 2018, 2022, and 2026 World Cups.

==== South Korea ====
Another major rival within Asia is South Korea, who Australia came up against in three World Cup qualification campaigns in the 1970s and, since joining the AFC, have met regularly, including the 2015 Asian Cup final.

==== Uruguay ====
A rivalry exists with Uruguay since their first meeting on the eve of the 1974 FIFA World Cup. Both nations have faced each other in consecutive FIFA World Cup play-offs in 2001 and 2005 with each nation winning a playoff final each to progress through to the World Cup. Australia and Uruguay also faced off in the 1997 Confederations Cup in Saudi Arabia, with Australia progressing through to the final against Brazil via a golden goal winner from Harry Kewell.

=== Supporters ===
The main supporter group of the Australian national team is Australian Active Support (AAS). AAS, then known as Socceroos Active Support (SAS), was founded in January 2015 as an independent group, who uses social media to organise and keep in touch. This replaced the former active support group Terrace Australis, who were founded by Football Federation Australia and fans in 2013, during Australia's 2014 World Cup qualification campaign. Its establishment came in the wake of poor off-field action and minimal community engagement. Previously, the emergence of Terrace Australis saw the Green and Gold Army relinquish its role as a hub for active support, which it had claimed since its establishment in 2001. Since the 2015 AFC Asian Cup triumph, the supporters had encouraged people in Australia to focus more on the national team, and the nation's soccer pride.

=== Home stadium ===
Australia does not have a dedicated national stadium; instead, the team plays at different venues throughout the country for exhibition or tournament purposes. In recent years, major international matches have usually been rotated around various large grounds, including Stadium Australia in Sydney, Hunter Stadium in Newcastle and Docklands Stadium in Melbourne. International matches have also been played at the Melbourne Cricket Ground and Melbourne Rectangular Stadium in Melbourne and Canberra Stadium in Canberra.

Australia has played at the Gabba in Brisbane, which hosted Australia's first international match on home soil in 1923, a 2–1 win over New Zealand. It was the fourth Australian team match overall, with the first three internationals played in New Zealand. Other venues which regularly hosted international home matches included Olympic Park Stadium in Melbourne, the Sydney Cricket Ground, Sydney Sports Ground, Sydney Showground, and Sydney Football Stadium in Sydney, and Subiaco Oval in Perth.

==== Games in England ====
Since the 2003 friendly against England, the Socceroos have also played a significant number of games in England, especially London, since a high proportion of the senior team play in European leagues. This includes games at Madejski Stadium in Reading (Reading Football Club's home ground) in 2003 against Jamaica, Loftus Road in Shepherd's Bush (Queens Park Rangers' home ground) in 2004 and 2008 against South Africa, 2006 against Ghana, and 2007 against Denmark.

Craven Cottage in Fulham (Fulham Football Club's home ground) hosted Australia's matches against Norway in 2004, New Zealand and Jamaica in 2005. Craven Cottage also hosted Australia's matches against Jamaica in 2007, 2013 against Canada, 2014 against Saudi Arabia, and 2018 against Colombia, while Australia played at The Den in Bermondsey (Millwall Football Club's home ground) in 2014 against Ecuador, and Brentford Community Stadium in Brentford (Brentford Football Club's home ground) in 2023 against New Zealand.

== Results and fixtures ==
The following is a list of match results in the last 12 months, as well as any future matches that have been scheduled.

Win Draw Loss Fixture

=== 2026 ===
27 March 2026 FIFA Series	Australia	1–0	Cameroon	Sydney, Australia
20:10 UTC+11	Bos 84'	Report		Stadium: Stadium Australia; Attendance: 23,798; Referee: Robert Jones (England)

31 March 2026 FIFA Series	Australia	5–1	Curaçao	Melbourne, Australia
20:10 UTC+11	Mabil 23'; Circati 67'; Bos 71'; Irankunda 80', 84'	Report	Martha 50'	Stadium: Melbourne Rectangular Stadium; Attendance: 16,764; Referee: Andy Madley (England)

30 May Friendly	Mexico	1–0	Australia	Pasadena, United States
18:00 UTC−7	Vásquez 27'	Report		Stadium: Rose Bowl; Attendance: 78,479; Referee: Rubiel Vazquez (United States)

6 June Friendly	Switzerland	1–1	Australia	San Diego, United States
12:00 UTC−7	Ndoye 14'	Report	Yengi 56'	Stadium: Snapdragon Stadium; Attendance: 6,107; Referee: Katja Koroleva (United States)

13 June 2026 World Cup GS	Australia	2–0	Turkey	Vancouver, Canada
21:00 UTC−7	Irankunda 27'; Metcalfe 75'	Report		Stadium: BC Place; Attendance: 52,497; Referee: Jesús Valenzuela (Venezuela)

19 June 2026 World Cup GS	United States	2–0	Australia	Seattle, United States
12:00 UTC−7	Burgess 11' (o.g.); Freeman 43'	Report		Stadium: Lumen Field; Attendance: 66,925; Referee: Felix Zwayer (Germany)

25 June 2026 World Cup GS	Paraguay	0–0	Australia	Santa Clara, United States
19:00 UTC−7		Report		Stadium: Levi's Stadium; Attendance: 68,827; Referee: Clément Turpin (France)

3 July 2026 World Cup R32	Australia	1–1 (a.e.t.) (2–4 p)	Egypt	Arlington, United States
13:00 UTC−5	Hany 55' (o.g.)	Report	Ashour 13'	Stadium: AT&T Stadium; Attendance: 70,244; Referee: Gustavo Tejera (Uruguay)
	Penalties
	Souttar (penalty missed); Irvine (penalty scored); Mabil (penalty scored); Herrington (penalty missed)		(penalty scored) Saber; (penalty scored) Rabia; (penalty scored) Salah; (penalty scored) Abdelmaguid

25 September Friendly	Australia	1–1	Brazil	Townsville, Australia
20:00 UTC+10	Irankunda 68'	Report	Rayan 90+4'	Stadium: Queensland Country Bank Stadium; Attendance: 25,440; Referee: Ryo Tanimoto (Japan)

29 September Friendly	Australia	2–4	Brazil	Brisbane, Australia
20:00 UTC+10	Circati 30'; Metcalfe 34'	Report	Vanderson 3'; Raphinha 45+1' (pen.); Guimarães 70'; Vinícius 80' (pen.)	Stadium: Suncorp Stadium; Attendance: 52,423; Referee: Yusuke Araki (Japan)

13 November Friendly	Qatar	0–3	Australia	Doha, Qatar
17:45 UTC+3		Report	McGree 5'; T. Yengi 32'; Irankunda 40'	Stadium: Abdullah bin Khalifa Stadium; Referee: Yahya Al-Mulla (United Arab Emirates)

17 November Friendly	Jordan	2–0	Australia	Doha, Qatar (Note: On 12 November, the Jordan Football Association and Football Australia announced that the match would be relocated from Amman, Jordan to Doha, Qatar due to "security concerns.")
19:00 UTC+3	Al-Taamari 34'; Olwan 90+3'	Report		Stadium: Suheim bin Hamad Stadium; Referee: Saud Al-Samhan (Kuwait)

=== 2027 ===
TBA 2027 Asian Cup GS	Australia	Postponed	Singapore	Khobar, Saudi Arabia
				Stadium: Aramco Stadium

TBA 2027 Asian Cup GS	Iraq	Postponed	Australia	Riyadh, Saudi Arabia
				Stadium: King Saud University Stadium

TBA 2027 Asian Cup GS	Australia	Postponed	Tajikistan	Riyadh, Saudi Arabia
				Stadium: Al Shabab Stadium

== Coaching staff ==
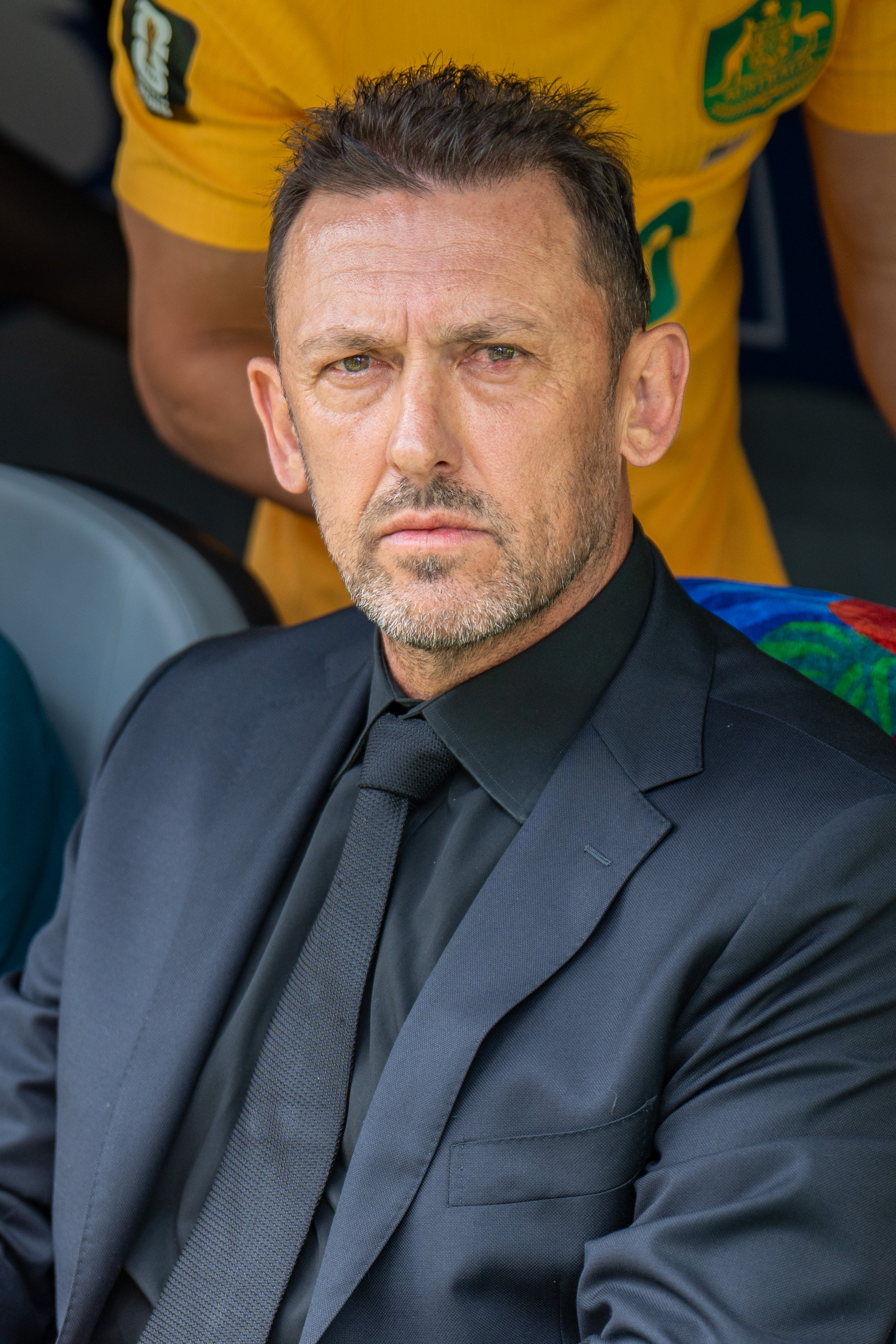
Current head coach Tony Popovic

=== Current coaching staff ===
As of September 2026

Role	Name
Head coach	(Australia) Tony Popovic
Assistant coaches	(Australia) Hayden Foxe (Australia) Paul Okon (Australia) Mile Jedinak
Goalkeeping coach	(Australia) Frank Juric

== Players ==
=== Current squad ===
The following players were called up in November 2026 for friendly internationals against Qatar and Jordan.

Caps and goals correct as of 17 November 2026, after the match against Jordan

No.	Pos.	Player	Date of birth (age)	Caps	Goals	Club
1	GK	Tom Glover	24 December 1997 (age 28)	0	0	(Japan Football Association) RB Omiya Ardija
12	GK	Joe Gauci	4 July 2000 (age 26)	8	0	(The Football Association) Lincoln City
18	GK	Patrick Beach	6 August 2003 (age 23)	10	0	(French Football Federation) Troyes
2	DF	Gianni Stensness	7 February 1999 (age 27)	3	0	(Norwegian Football Federation) Viking
3	DF	Alessandro Circati	10 October 2003 (age 23)	21	2	(Portuguese Football Federation) Benfica
4	DF	Jacob Italiano	30 July 2001 (age 25)	11	0	(Austrian Football Association) Grazer AK
5	DF	Kasey Bos	8 May 2004 (age 22)	2	0	(Royal Dutch Football Association) Excelsior
6	DF	Jason Geria	10 May 1993 (age 33)	20	0	(Japan Football Association) Albirex Niigata
16	DF	Aziz Behich	16 December 1990 (age 35)	91	3	(Football Australia) Melbourne City
17	DF	Diesel Herrington	4 August 2004 (age 22)	2	0	(Football Australia) Central Coast Mariners
19	DF	Harry Souttar	22 October 1998 (age 28)	46	11	(The Football Association) Leicester City
21	DF	Kealey Adamson	17 February 2003 (age 23)	0	0	(The Football Association) Queens Park Rangers
25	DF	Lucas Herrington	5 September 2007 (age 19)	10	0	(The Football Association) Hull City
8	MF	Connor Metcalfe	5 November 1999 (age 27)	44	3	(German Football Association) FC St. Pauli
14	MF	Riley McGree	2 November 1998 (age 28)	39	2	(The Football Association) Middlesbrough
23	MF	Sam Klein	15 March 2004 (age 22)	2	0	(German Football Association) FC St. Pauli
24	MF	Paul Okon-Engstler	24 January 2005 (age 21)	14	0	(German Football Association) FC Köln
9	FW	Kusini Yengi	15 January 1999 (age 27)	13	6	(Japan Football Association) Sanfrecce Hiroshima
10	FW	Nestory Irankunda	9 February 2006 (age 20)	23	8	(Portuguese Football Federation) Sporting CP
11	FW	Marcus Younis	3 July 2005 (age 21)	4	0	(Danish Football Association) Brøndby
13	FW	Daniel Arzani	4 January 1999 (age 27)	12	1	(Hungarian Football Federation) Ferencváros
22	FW	Thomas Waddingham	5 April 2005 (age 21)	0	0	(The Football Association) Portsmouth
26	FW	Tete Yengi	28 November 2000 (age 25)	7	2	(Japan Football Association) Machida Zelvia

=== Recent call-ups ===
The following players have been called up to the national team in the past 12 months but are not part of the current squad.

Pos.	Player	Date of birth (age)	Caps	Goals	Club	Latest call-up
GK	Paul Izzo	6 January 1995 (age 31)	4	0	(Denmark) Randers	v. Brazil, 29 September 2026
GK	Jacob Chapman	22 October 2000 (age 26)	0	0	(Scotland) St Mirren	v. Brazil, 29 September 2026
GK	Mathew Ryan	8 April 1992 (age 34)	105	0	(Spain) Levante	2026 FIFA World Cup
DF	Milos Degenek	28 April 1994 (age 32)	57	1	(Cyprus) APOEL	v. Brazil, 29 September 2026
DF	Dylan Leonard	14 May 2007 (age 19)	0	0	(Germany) Alemannia Aachen	v. Brazil, 29 September 2026
DF	Jordan Bos	29 October 2002 (age 24)	31	4	(Netherlands) Feyenoord	2026 FIFA World Cup
DF	Cameron Burgess	21 October 1995 (age 31)	29	0	(Wales) Swansea City	2026 FIFA World Cup
DF	Kai Trewin	18 May 2001 (age 25)	7	0	(United States) New York City	2026 FIFA World Cup
DF	Kye Rowles	24 June 1998 (age 28)	29	1	(United States) D.C. United	Pre-World Cup training camp, 31 May 2026
DF	Hayden Matthews	19 June 2004 (age 22)	1	0	(England) Bradford City	Pre-World Cup training camp, 14 May 2026 ^{INJ}
DF	Fran Karačić	12 May 1996 (age 30)	15	1	(Croatia) Lokomotiva Zagreb	v. Cameroon, 27 March 2026 ^{INJ}
MF	Patrick Yazbek	5 April 2002 (age 24)	11	0	(United States) Nashville SC	v. Qatar, 13 November 2026 ^{INJ}
MF	Jackson Irvine	7 March 1993 (age 33)	88	14	(Japan) Cerezo Osaka	v. Brazil, 29 September 2026
MF	Aiden O'Neill	4 July 1998 (age 28)	37	0	(United States) New York City	v. Brazil, 29 September 2026
MF	Alexander Robertson	17 April 2003 (age 23)	3	0	(Wales) Cardiff City	v. Brazil, 25 September 2026
MF	Ajdin Hrustic	5 July 1996 (age 30)	39	4	(United Arab Emirates) Al-Nasr	2026 FIFA World Cup
MF	Cameron Devlin	7 June 1998 (age 28)	5	0	(Scotland) Rangers	2026 FIFA World Cup
MF	Anthony Caceres	29 September 1992 (age 34)	4	0	(Thailand) Bangkok United	Pre-World Cup training camp, 14 May 2026
MF	Daniel Bennie	13 April 2006 (age 20)	0	0	(Scotland) Dundee United	Pre-World Cup training camp, 14 May 2026
MF	Raphael Borges Rodrigues	11 September 2003 (age 23)	0	0	(England) Burton Albion	Pre-World Cup training camp, 14 May 2026
FW	Eli Adams	12 March 2002 (age 24)	1	0	(Japan) Gamba Osaka	v. Qatar, 13 November 2026 ^{INJ}
FW	Nishan Velupillay	7 May 2001 (age 25)	10	3	(Germany) Ingolstadt 04	v. Brazil, 29 September 2026
FW	Yaya Dukuly	17 January 2003 (age 23)	0	0	(Slovenia) Celje	v. Brazil, 29 September 2026
FW	Mohamed Touré	26 March 2004 (age 22)	13	2	(England) Norwich City	v. Brazil, 25 September 2026
FW	Mathew Leckie	4 February 1991 (age 35)	82	14	(Australia) Melbourne City	2026 FIFA World Cup
FW	Awer Mabil	15 September 1995 (age 31)	39	10	(Australia) Melbourne City	2026 FIFA World Cup
FW	Cristian Volpato	15 November 2003 (age 23)	4	0	(Italy) Sassuolo	2026 FIFA World Cup
FW	Martin Boyle	25 April 1993 (age 33)	41	10	(Scotland) Hibernian	Pre-World Cup training camp, 31 May 2026
FW	Brandon Borrello	25 July 1995 (age 31)	16	2	(Australia) Western Sydney Wanderers	Pre-World Cup training camp, 31 May 2026
FW	Mitch Duke ^{RET}	18 January 1991 (age 35)	50	13	(Japan) Machida Zelvia	Pre-World Cup training camp, 14 May 2026
FW	Nicholas D'Agostino	25 February 1998 (age 28)	4	0	(Norway) Viking	Pre-World Cup training camp, 14 May 2026 ^{INJ}
FW	Deni Jurić	3 September 1997 (age 29)	2	0	(Poland) Wisła Płock	Pre-World Cup training camp, 14 May 2026
FW	Ante Šuto	19 June 2000 (age 26)	0	0	(Scotland) Hibernian	Pre-World Cup training camp, 14 May 2026
Notes: ^{INJ} = Injured; ^{RET} = Retired from the national team

== Individual records ==
Australia currently hold the world record for the largest win and the most goals scored by a player in an international match. Both records were achieved during the 2002 FIFA World Cup qualification match against American Samoa on 11 April 2001. Australia won 31–0 with Archie Thompson scoring 13 goals and David Zdrilic scoring eight. Two days before the 31–0 win, Australia broke the record for largest win with a 22–0 win over Tonga. With 13 and 8 goals respectively, both Thompson and Zdrilic broke the previous record jointly held by another Australian, Gary Cole, who scored seven goals against Fiji in 1981, and Iranian Karim Bagheri, who also scored seven goals against Maldives in 1997.

As of 13 November 2026
Players in bold are still active with Australia.

=== Most appearances ===
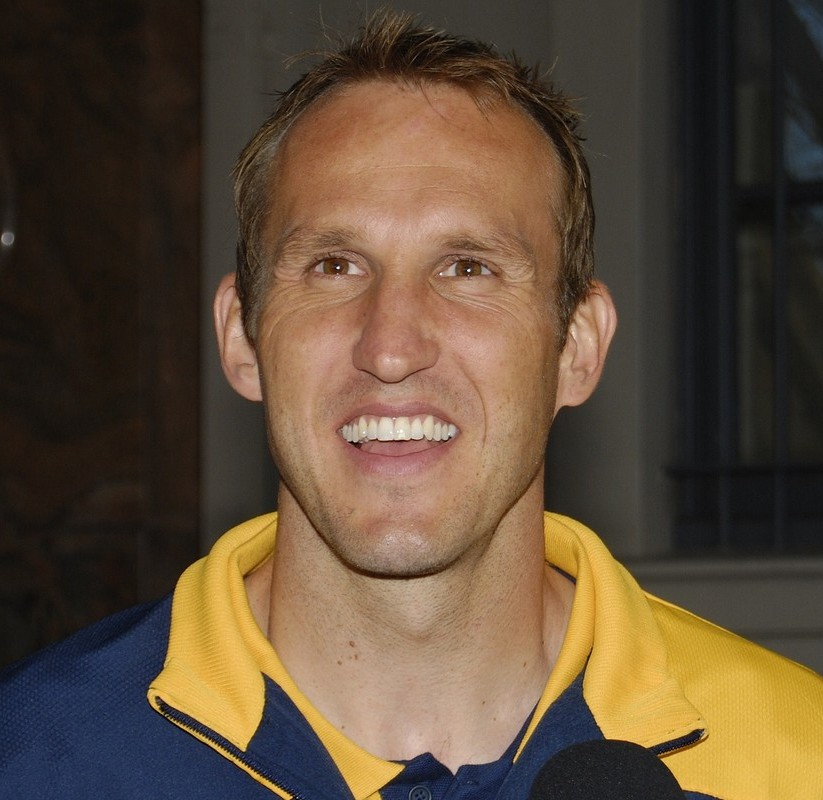
Goalkeeper Mark Schwarzer is the most capped player in the history of Australia with 109 caps.

Rank	Name	Caps	Goals	Position	Period
1	Mark Schwarzer	109	0	GK	1993–2013
2	Tim Cahill	108	50	FW	2004–2018
3	**Mathew Ryan**	105	0	GK	2012–present
4	Lucas Neill	96	1	DF	1996–2013
5	Brett Emerton	95	20	MF	1998–2012
6	**Aziz Behich**	90	3	DF	2012–present
7	**Jackson Irvine**	88	14	MF	2013–present
8	Alex Tobin	87	2	DF	1988–1998
9	Mark Bresciano	84	13	MF	2001–2015
9	Paul Wade	84	10	MF	1986–1996

=== Top goalscorers ===
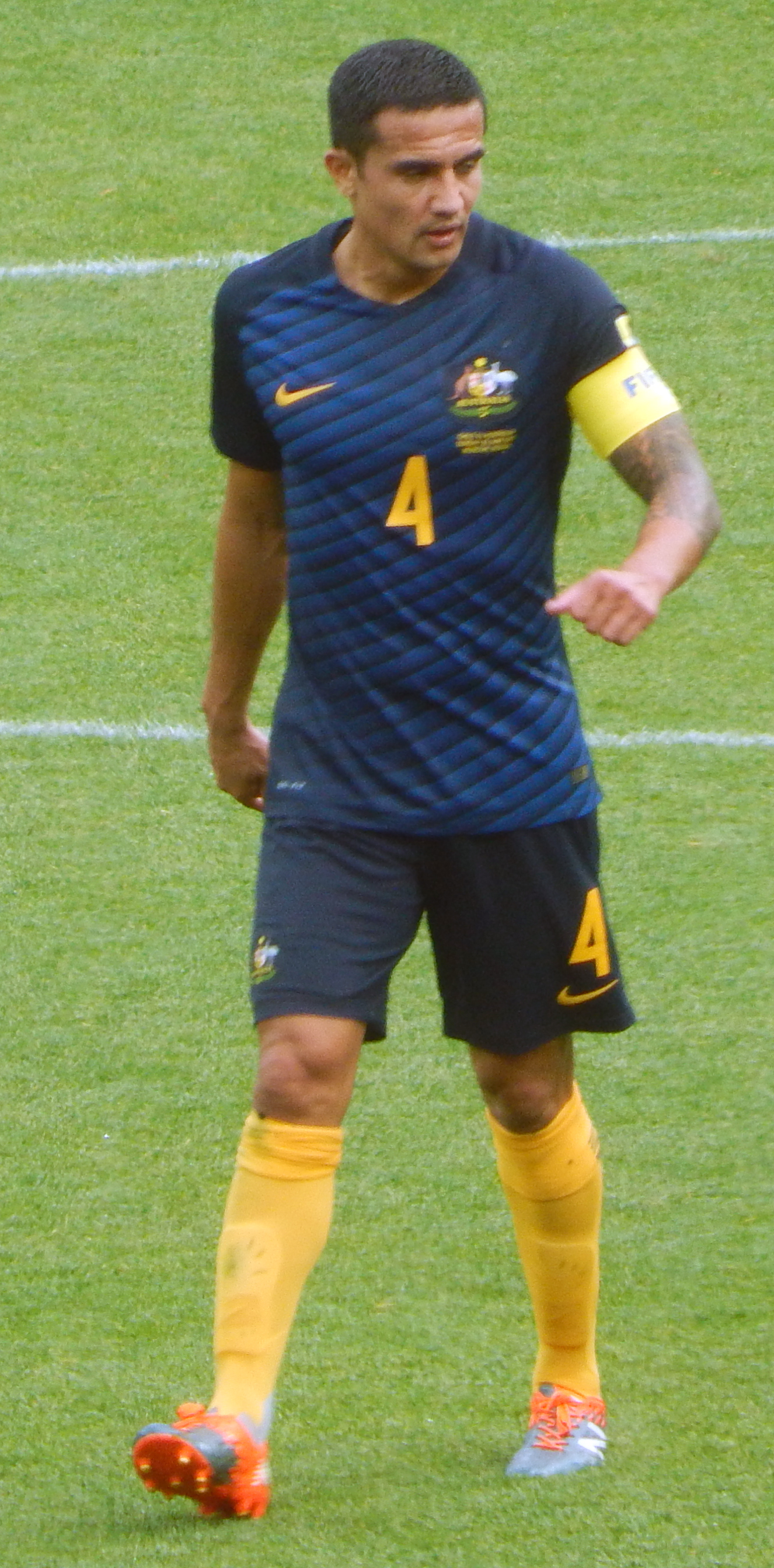
Tim Cahill is Australia's top scorer with 50 goals.

Rank	Name	Goals	Caps	Ratio	Period
1	Tim Cahill (list)	50	108	0.46	2004–2018
2	Damian Mori	29	45	0.64	1992–2002
3	Archie Thompson	28	54	0.52	2001–2013
4	John Aloisi	27	55	0.49	1993–2008
5	John Kosmina	25	60	0.42	1977–1988
5	Attila Abonyi	25	61	0.41	1967–1977
7	David Zdrilić	20	31	0.65	1997–2010
7	Mile Jedinak	20	79	0.25	2008–2018
7	Brett Emerton	20	95	0.21	1998–2012
10	Graham Arnold	19	56	0.34	1985–1997

=== Most clean sheets ===
Rank	Name	Clean sheets	Caps	Ratio	Period
1	Mark Schwarzer	44	109	0.4	1993–2013
2	**Mathew Ryan**	40	103	0.38	2012–present
3	Zeljko Kalac	24	54	0.44	1992–2006
4	Jeff Olver	13	37	0.35	1985–1989
5	Robert Zabica	12	27	0.44	1990–1994

== Competitive record ==
=== FIFA World Cup ===
Winners Runners-up Third place

FIFA World Cup record										Qualification record						
Year	Host	Round	Pld	W	D	L	GF	GA	Squad	Pos.	Pld	W	D	L	GF	GA
1930 to 1962		Not a FIFA member								Not a FIFA member						
1966	England	Did not qualify								2nd	2	0	0	2	2	9
1970	Mexico	Did not qualify								1st	9	3	5	1	12	8
1974	West Germany	Group stage	3	0	1	2	0	5	Squad	1st	11	5	5	1	21	10
1978	Argentina	Did not qualify								4th	12	6	2	4	20	11
1982	Spain	Did not qualify								2nd	8	4	2	2	22	9
1986	Mexico	Did not qualify								1st	8	4	3	1	20	4
1990	Italy	Did not qualify								2nd	6	2	2	2	11	7
1994	United States	Did not qualify								1st	10	7	1	2	21	7
1998	France	Did not qualify								1st	8	6	2	0	34	5
2002	Japan; South Korea	Did not qualify								1st	8	7	0	1	73	4
2006	Germany	Round of 16	4	1	1	2	5	6	Squad	1st	9	7	1	1	31	5
2010	South Africa	Group stage	3	1	1	1	3	6	Squad	1st	14	9	3	2	19	4
2014	Brazil	Group stage	3	0	0	3	3	9	Squad	2nd	14	8	4	2	25	12
2018	Russia	Group stage	3	0	1	2	2	5	Squad	3rd	22	14	6	2	51	18
2022	Qatar	Round of 16	4	2	0	2	4	6	Squad	3rd	20	13	4	3	45	12
2026	Canada; Mexico; United States	Round of 32	4	1	2	1	3	3	Squad	2nd	16	11	4	1	38	7
2030	Morocco; Portugal; Spain	To be determined								To be determined						
2034	Saudi Arabia	To be determined								To be determined						
Total		Round of 16	24	5	6	13	20	40	—	7/16	177	106	44	27	445	132

=== FIFA Confederations Cup ===
Winners Runners-up Third place

FIFA Confederations Cup record
Year	Host	Round	Pld	W	D	L	GF	GA	Squad
1992 to 1995		No OFC representative invited							
1997	Saudi Arabia	Runners-up	5	2	1	2	4	8	Squad
1999	Mexico	Did not qualify							
2001	Japan; South Korea	Third place	5	3	0	2	4	2	Squad
2003	France	Did not qualify							
2005	Germany	Group stage	3	0	0	3	5	10	Squad
2009	South Africa	Did not qualify							
2013	Brazil	Did not qualify							
2017	Russia	Group stage	3	0	2	1	4	5	Squad
Total		Runners-up	16	5	3	8	17	25	—

=== AFC Asian Cup ===
Winners Runners-up Third place

AFC Asian Cup record										Qualification record						
Year	Host	Round	Pld	W	D	L	GF	GA	Squad	Pos.	Pld	W	D	L	GF	GA
1956 to 2004		Not an AFC member								Not an AFC member						
2007 (Note: Australia played their 2007 matches in Thailand and Vietnam.)	Indonesia; Malaysia; Thailand; Vietnam	Quarter-finals	4	1	2	1	7	5	Squad	1st	4	3	0	1	7	3
2011	Qatar	Runners-up	6	4	1	1	13	2	Squad	1st	6	3	2	1	6	4
2015	Australia	Winners	6	5	0	1	14	3	Squad	Qualified as hosts						
2019	United Arab Emirates	Quarter-finals	5	2	1	2	6	4	Squad	1st	8	7	0	1	29	4
2023	Qatar	Quarter-finals	5	3	1	1	9	3	Squad	1st	8	8	0	0	28	2
2027	Saudi Arabia	Qualified								1st	6	6	0	0	22	0
Total		Winners	26	15	5	6	49	17	—	6/6	32	27	2	3	92	13

=== OFC Men's Nations Cup ===
Winners Runners-up Third place

OFC Men's Nations Cup record
Year	Host	Round	Pld	W	D	L	GF	GA	Squad
1973	New Zealand	Did not enter							
1980	New Caledonia	Winners	4	4	0	0	24	4	Squad
1996		Winners	4	3	1	0	14	0	Squad
1998	Australia	Runners-up	4	3	0	1	23	3	Squad
2000	Tahiti	Winners	4	4	0	0	26	0	Squad
2002	New Zealand	Runners-up	5	4	0	1	23	2	Squad
2004	Australia	Winners	7	6	1	0	32	4	Squad
Total		Winners	28	24	2	2	142	13	—

=== Summer Olympics ===
Summer Olympics record										Qualification record					
Year	Round	Pos.	Pld	W	D	L	GF	GA	Squad	Pld	W	D	L	GF	GA
(United Kingdom) 1908	Did not participate									Did not participate					
(Sweden) 1912	Did not participate									Did not participate					
(Belgium) 1920	Did not participate									Did not participate					
(France) 1924	Did not participate									Did not participate					
(Netherlands) 1928	Did not participate									Did not participate					
(Germany) 1936	Did not participate									Did not participate					
(United Kingdom) 1948	Did not participate									Did not participate					
(Finland) 1952	Did not participate									Did not participate					
(Australia) 1956	Quarter-finals	5th	2	1	0	1	4	4	Squad	Qualified as host					
(Italy) 1960	Withdrew									Withdrew					
(Japan) 1964	Did not enter									Did not enter					
(Mexico) 1968	Did not enter									Did not enter					
(West Germany) 1972	Did not enter									Did not enter					
(Canada) 1976	Did not enter									Did not enter					
(Soviet Union) 1980	Did not enter									Did not enter					
(United States) 1984	Did not enter									Did not enter					
(South Korea) 1988	Quarter-finals	7th	4	2	0	2	2	6	Squad	8	6	2	0	18	4
1992 to present	See Australia men's national under-23 soccer team														
Total	Quarter-finals	2/17	6	3	0	3	6	10	—	8	6	2	0	18	4

=== Minor tournaments ===
Year	Pos.	Pld	W	D	L	GF	GA
(New Zealand) 1922 Soccer Ashes	2nd	3	0	1	2	3	7
(Australia) 1923 Soccer Ashes	2nd	3	1	0	2	5	8
(Australia) 1933 Soccer Ashes	1st	3	3	0	0	14	8
(New Zealand) 1936 Soccer Ashes	1st	3	3	0	0	21	2
(New Zealand) 1948 Soccer Ashes	1st	4	4	0	0	17	0
(Australia) 1954 Soccer Ashes	1st	3	2	0	1	9	4
1967 South Vietnam Independence Cup	1st	5	5	0	0	15	6
(Singapore) 1982 Merlion Cup	1st	4	4	0	0	14	2
(Australia) (New Zealand) 1983 Trans-Tasman Trophy	2nd	2	0	0	2	1	4
(Singapore) 1983 Merlion Cup	1st	4	3	0	1	10	5
1984 China–Australia Ampol Cup	2nd	1	0	0	1	2	3
1985 China–Australia Ampol Cup	1st	1	1	0	0	3	0
(Australia) (New Zealand) 1986 Trans-Tasman Trophy	1st	2	1	1	0	3	2
1986 China–Australia Ampol Cup	1st	1	1	0	0	2	0
(South Korea) 1987 President's Cup	2nd	3	2	1	0	2	1
(Australia) (New Zealand) 1987 Trans-Tasman Trophy	2nd	2	0	1	1	1	2
1988 Australia Bicentenary Gold Cup	2nd	4	2	0	2	7	4
(Australia) (New Zealand) 1988 Trans-Tasman Trophy	1st	2	2	0	0	4	1
(Indonesia) 1990 Independence Cup	1st	1	1	0	0	3	0
(Australia) (New Zealand) 1991 Trans-Tasman Trophy	1st	2	2	0	0	3	1
(South Korea) 1991 President's Cup	2nd	1	0	1	0	0	0
(Indonesia) 1992 Independence Cup	3rd	2	1	0	1	3	1
(Japan) 1994 Kirin Cup	2nd	2	0	1	1	1	2
(Australia) (New Zealand) 1995 Trans-Tasman Trophy	1st	2	1	1	0	3	0
(South Africa) 1996 Simba Cup	2nd	3	2	0	1	6	2
(Chile) 2000 Copa Ciudad de Valparaíso	4th	3	0	2	1	2	3
(United Arab Emirates) 2000 LG Cup (UAE)	3rd	2	1	0	1	3	4
(Japan) 2001 AFC–OFC Challenge Cup	2nd	1	0	0	1	0	3
Total	14 Titles	69	42	9	17	150	75

== FIFA Rankings ==
A line chart depicting the history of Australia's year-end placements in the FIFA World Rankings. View source data.

Last update was on 22 December 2025 Source:

Best Ranking Worst Ranking Best Mover Worst Mover

Australia's FIFA world rankings
Rank	Year	Games Played	Best		Worst	
Rank	Year	Games Played	Rank	Move	Rank	Move
26	2025	10	24	▲2	26	▼1
26	2024	16	23	▲2	26	▼2
25	2023	8	25	▲2	29	▼2
27	2022	13	27	▲8	42	▼6
35	2021	10	32	▲6	41	▼2
41	2020	0	41	▲1	42	▼1
42	2019	10	41	▲2	46	▼3
41	2018	11	32	▲4	43	▼7
38	2017	13	38	▲7	55	▼10
47	2016	10	40	▲17	68	▼9
57	2015	14	57	▲37	100	▼2
100	2014	11	53	▲4	102	▼14
58	2013	12	36	▲7	59	▼7
36	2012	13	20	▲2	36	▼9
23	2011	17	19	▲5	26	▼2
26	2010	13	19	▲4	26	▼6
21	2009	12	14	▲13	32	▼10
28	2008	13	28	▲10	48	▼5
48	2007	10	39	▲4	52	▼6
39	2006	13	33	▲9	48	▼4
48	2005	12	48	▲9	60	▼4
58	2004	12	49	▲40	89	▼9
82	2003	3	45	▲6	82	▼13
50	2002	4	43	▲4	50	▼3
48	2001	16	46	▲18	77	▼5
73	2000	15	63	▲29	92	▼6
89	1999	0	50		89	▼11
39	1998	9	32	▲3	39	▼6
35	1997	19	31	▲17	36	▼4
50	1996	12	48	▲9	61	▼9
51	1995	9	47	▲11	58	▼8
58	1994	6	44	▲2	58	▼6
49	1993	10	49	▲12	65	▼13

== Honours ==
=== Global ===
- FIFA Confederations Cup
  - Runners-up (1): 1997
  - Third place (1): 2001

=== Intercontinental ===
- AFC-OFC Challenge Cup
  - Runners-up (1): 2001

=== Continental ===
- AFC Asian Cup
  - Champions (1): 2015
  - Runners-up (1): 2011
- OFC Nations Cup
  - Champions (4): 1980, 1996, 2000, 2004
  - Runners-up (2): 1998, 2002

=== Friendly ===
- Trans-Tasman Cup (4): 1986, 1988, 1991, 1995
- Soccer Ashes (6): 1933, 1936, 1948, 1954, 2023, 2025
- Indonesian Independence Cup (1): 1990
- South Vietnam Independence Cup (1): 1967
- Australia Bicentenary Gold Cup (1): 1988
- Merlion Cup (2): 1982, 1983
- FIFA Series (1): 2026

=== Awards ===
- AFC Men's Team of the Year (2): 2006, 2015
- AFC Asian Cup Fair Play Award (1): 2015

=== Summary ===
Competition	1st place, gold medalist(s)	2nd place, silver medalist(s)	3rd place, bronze medalist(s)	Total
FIFA Confederations Cup	0	1	1	2
AFC Asian Cup	1	1	0	2
OFC Nations Cup	4	2	0	6
AFC–OFC Challenge Cup	0	1	0	1
Total	5	5	1	11

== See also ==
- Australia women's national soccer team
- Soccer in Australia
- List of Australia men's national soccer team captains
- Australia 31–0 American Samoa
- Trans-Tasman Cup
- Australia men's national futsal team
- Australia women's national futsal team
