= 1933 in Australian soccer =

Soccer in Australia
- Season: 1933

The 1933 season was the 50th season of regional competitive soccer in Australia.

== National teams ==
=== Australia men's national soccer team ===
Australia began 1933 with the first of their three-match series hosting New Zealand at Brisbane Cricket Ground on 5 June with all eleven starting players making their national team debuts and George Smith as captain on debut. They won the match 4–2 with George Smith and Hec Gorring both scoring two goals. With twelve days rest until the second match at Sydney Cricket Ground on 17 June, it saw four further debutants Ian Davidson, Jack Hughes, Frank Smith, and Tom Tennant; and was won by Australia 6–4 thanks to a George Smith hat-trick (the first ever Australia men's national team hat-trick), and further goals by Roy Crowhurst, Alec Cameron and Jack Hughes. The third and final match of the series was again played at Sydney Cricket Ground on a week later on 24 June, where Bill Edwards, Frank Laidlaw, Jimmy Osborne, and Jack Taylor made their Australia debut as Australia won 4–2 through a brace by George Smith, with Bill Edwards scoring on debut alongside Roy Crowhurst in his third match. Australia finished the series with three wins out of three matches.

==== Results and fixtures ====
===== Friendlies =====
5 June 1933	Australia	4–2	New Zealand	Brisbane, Australia
	Smith 20' (?); Gorring (?), 80'	Report	Kershaw 55'; Chapman (?)	Stadium: Brisbane Exhibition Ground; Attendance: 5,000; Referee: Z. Korotcoff (Australia)

17 June 1933	Australia	6–4	New Zealand	Sydney, Australia
	Smith (?); Crowhurst (?); Cameron (?); Hughes (?)	Report	Chapman (?); Kay (?); Kershaw (?); Ives (?)	Stadium: Sydney Cricket Ground; Attendance: 5,000; Referee: Danny Quinn (Australia)

24 June 1933	Australia	4–2	New Zealand	Sydney, Australia
	Edwards (?); Crowhurst (?); G. Smith (?)	Report	Kershaw (?)	Stadium: Sydney Cricket Ground; Referee: Danny Quinn (Australia)

==== Player statistics ====
Pos.	Player	Apps	Goals
GK	Jimmy McNabb	3	0
FB	Jack Evans	3	0
FB	Frank Laidlaw	1	0
HB	Ian Davidson	1	0
HB	Angus Gibb	1	0
HB	Bert Murray	1	0
HB	Jimmy Osborne	1	0
HB	Charlie O'Connor	3	0
HB	Jock Parkes	2	0
HB	Jack Taylor	1	0
HB	Tom Tennant	1	0
FW	Alec Cameron	3	1
FW	Roy Crowhurst	3	2
FW	Jim Donaldson	1	0
FW	Bill Edwards	1	0
FW	Hec Gorring	1	2
FW	Jack Hughes	1	1
FW	Frank Smith	2	0
FW	George Smith	3	7

== League competitions ==
Federation	Competition	Grand Final			Regular Season	
Federation	Competition	Winners	Score	Runners-up	Winners	Runners-up
Federal Capital Territory Soccer Football Association	FCTSA League	Not played			Not played	
Australian Soccer Association	NSW State League	St George	0–6	Wallsend	North: Wallsend; South: St George	North: West Wallsend; South: Leichhardt Annandale
Queensland British Football Association	Brisbane Area League	Latrobe	4–1	Toowong	Latrobe	YMCA
South Australian British Football Association	South Australia Division One	Not played			Kingswood	West Torrens
Tasmanian Soccer Association	Tasmania Division One	Sandy Bay	3–0	Tamar	North: Tamar; South: Sandy Bay	North: Invermay United; South: South Hobart
Anglo-Australian Football Association	Victoria Division One	Not played			Royal Caledonians	South Yarra
Western Australian Soccer Football Association	Western Australia Division One	Not played			Caledonian	Victoria Park

== Cup competitions ==
Federation	Competition	Winners	Runners-up	Venue	Result
Australian Soccer Association	NSW State Cup	St George (1/0)	Cessnock (1/2)		5–3 (R)
South Australian British Football Association	South Australian Federation Cup	Port Adelaide (2/2)	West Torrens (3/1)		2–1
Tasmanian Soccer Association	Falkinder Cup	Sandy Bay (5/2)	Cascades (1/1)		6–1
Anglo-Australian Football Association	Dockerty Cup	Brighton (1/0)	St Kilda (3/1)		2–1

(Note: figures in parentheses display the club's competition record as winners/runners-up.)

== See also ==
- Soccer in Australia
