= 1928 in Australian soccer =

Soccer in Australia
- Season: 1928

The 1928 season was the 45th season of regional competitive soccer in Australia.

== League competitions ==
Federation	Competition	Grand Final			Regular Season		
Federation	Competition	Winners	Score	Runners-up	Winners	Runners-up	Third place
Federal Capital Territory Soccer Football Association	FCTSA League	Not played			Queanbeyan	Burns	Kingston
Northern District British Football Association	Northern NSW Football League	New Lambton	1–0	Adamstown Rosebud	West Wallsend	Adamstown Rosebud	New Lambton
Australian Soccer Association	Sydney Metropolitan First Division	Pyrmont	7–1	Balgownie	–		
Queensland British Football Association	Brisbane Area League	Not played			Kangaroo Point Rovers	Bundamba Rangers	Dinmore Bush Rats
South Australian British Football Association	South Australian Metropolitan League	Not played			West Torrens	Sturt	West Adelaide
Tasmanian Soccer Association	Tasmanian Division One	Hobart Athletic	5–0	Elphin	North: Elphin; South: Hobart Athletic	North: Tamar; South: South Hobart	North: North Esk; South: Sandy Bay
Anglo-Australian Football Association	Victorian League Division One	Naval Depot	2–1	Footscray Thistle	North: Footscray Thistle; South: Naval Depot	North: Preston; South: South Melbourne	North: Heidelberg; South: Box Hill
Western Australian Soccer Football Association	Western Australian Division One	Not played			Victoria Park	Claremont-Cottesloe	Caledonian

== Cup competitions ==
Federation	Competition	Winners	Runners-up	Venue	Result
Northern District British Football Association	Ellis Cup	Adamstown Rosebud	West Wallsend	–	3–1 (R)
New South Wales British Football Association	Gardiner Challenge Cup	Thorril Rangers (1/0)	Pyrmont (0/1)	–	3–0
South Australian British Football Association	South Australian Federation Cup	West Torrens (2/0)	West Adelaide United (0/1)	–	2–1
Tasmanian Soccer Association	Falkinder Cup	South Hobart (4/3)	Hobart Athletic (0/2)	–	3–2
Anglo-Australian Football Association	Dockerty Cup	Naval Depot (3/1)	Wonthaggi Magpies (0/1)	–	6–0

(Note: figures in parentheses display the club's competition record as winners/runners-up.)

== See also ==
- Soccer in Australia
