= 1927 in Australian soccer =

The 1927 season was the 44th season of regional competitive soccer in Australia.

== League competitions ==
Federation	Competition	Grand Final			Regular Season		
Federation	Competition	Winners	Score	Runners-up	Winners	Runners-up	Third place
Federal Capital Territory Soccer Football Association	FCTSA League	Molonglo	1–0	Queanbeyan	Molonglo	Burns	Queanbeyan
Northern District British Football Association	Northern NSW Football League	Cessnock	2–0	Adamstown Rosebud	Cessnock	West Wallsend	Aberdare
Australian Soccer Association	Sydney Metropolitan First Division	Gladesville-Ryde	2–1	Balgownie	Gladesville-Ryde	Balgownie	—
Queensland British Football Association	Brisbane Area League	Not played			Bundamba Rangers	Shafston Rovers	Dinmore Bush Rats
South Australian British Football Association	South Australian Metropolitan League	Not played			Port Adelaide	West Torrens	West Adelaide
Tasmanian Soccer Association	Tasmanian Division One	Sandy Bay	2–1	Elphin	North: Elphin; South: Sandy Bay	North: Patons and Baldwin; South: South Hobart	North: Tamar; South: Hobart Athletic
Anglo-Australian Football Association	Victorian League Division One	Not played			Prahran City	Footscray Thistle	South Melbourne
Western Australian Soccer Football Association	Western Australian Division One	Not played			Fremantle Caledonian	Perth City	Victoria Park

== Cup competitions ==
Federation	Competition	Winners	Runners-up	Venue	Result
Northern District British Football Association	Ellis Cup	Cessnock	Adamstown Rosebud	–	2–0
New South Wales British Football Association	Gardiner Challenge Cup	Gladesville-Ryde (1/0)	Granville (3/4)	–	2–0
South Australian British Football Association	South Australian Federation Cup	West Torrens (1/0)	West Adelaide (0/1)	–	2–1
Tasmanian Soccer Association	Tasmanian Division One	Sandy Bay (4/0)	Hobart Athletic (0/1)	–	1–0
Anglo-Australian Football Association	Dockerty Cup	Footscray Thistle (1/1)	Naval Depot (2/1)	–	5–2 (a.e.t.)

(Note: figures in parentheses display the club's competition record as winners/runners-up.)

== See also ==
- Soccer in Australia
