= 1929 in Australian soccer =

Soccer in Australia
- Season: 1929

The 1929 season was the 46th season of regional competitive soccer in Australia.

== League competitions ==
Federation	Competition	Grand Final			Regular Season		
Federation	Competition	Winners	Score	Runners-up	Winners	Runners-up	Third place
Federal Capital Territory Soccer Football Association	FCTSA League	Not played			Not played		
Australian Soccer Association	NSW State League	Not played			Cessnock	Gladesville Ryde	Aberdare
Queensland British Football Association	Brisbane Division One	Not played			Latrobe	Bundamba Rangers	St Helens
South Australian British Football Association	South Australian Metropolitan League	Not played			West Torrens	Port Adelaide	Sturt
Tasmanian Soccer Association	Tasmanian Division One	South Hobart	2–1	Invermay United	North: Invermay United; South: South Hobart	North: Rapson; South: Hobart Athletic	North: Elphin; South: Sandy Bay
Anglo-Australian Football Association	Victorian League Division One	Not played			Footscray Thistle	Naval Depot	Melbourne Thistle
Western Australian Soccer Football Association	Western Australian Division One	Not played			Victoria Park	Caledonian	Thistle

== Cup competitions ==
Federation	Competition	Winners	Runners-up	Venue	Result
New South Wales British Football Association	NSW State Cup Series	Aberdare (1/0)	Weston (0/1)	Cessnock Ground	2–0
South Australian British Football Association	South Australian Federation Cup	West Torrens (3/0)	South Australian Railways (0/1)	–	3–2
Tasmanian Soccer Association	Falkinder Cup	Hobart Athletic (1/2)	Sandy Bay (4/1)	–	3–2
Anglo-Australian Football Association	Dockerty Cup	Footscray Thistle (3/1)	St Kilda (2/4)	–	3–2

(Note: figures in parentheses display the club's competition record as winners/runners-up.)

== See also ==
- Soccer in Australia
