= 1925 in Australian soccer =

The 1925 season was the 42nd season of regional competitive soccer in Australia.

== League competitions ==
Federation	Competition	Grand Final			Regular Season		
Federation	Competition	Winners	Score	Runners-up	Winners	Runners-up	Third place
Northern District British Football Association	Northern NSW Football League	Cessnock	2–1	Adamstown Rosebud	West Wallsend Bluebells	Adamstown Rosebud	Kurri Kurri
Australian Soccer Association	Sydney Metropolitan First Division	Granville	2–1	Gladesville	Granville	Gladesville	Balmain
Queensland British Football Association	Brisbane Area League	Pineapple Rovers	5–2	Thistle	Pineapple Rovers	Shafston Rovers	Dinmore Wanderers
South Australian British Football Association	South Australian Metropolitan League	Not played			West Torrens	Port Adelaide	Sturt
Tasmanian Soccer Association	Tasmanian Division One	Sandy Bay	2–0	Patons and Baldwins	Unknown		
Anglo-Australian Football Association	Victorian League Division One	Not played			Melbourne Thistle	Footscray Thistle	Naval Depot
Western Australian Soccer Football Association	Western Australian Division One	Not played			Thistle	Claremont	Northern Casuals

== Cup competitions ==
Federation	Competition	Winners	Runners-up	Venue	Result
Northern District British Football Association	Ellis Cup	Cessnock	Adamstown Rosebud	–	2–1
New South Wales British Football Association	Gardiner Challenge Cup	Adamstown Rosebud (2/0)	Cessnock (0/1)	–	2–0
South Australian British Football Association	South Australian Federation Cup	West Torrens (1/0)	Sturt (1/2)	–	3–1
Anglo-Australian Football Association	Dockerty Cup	Melbourne Thistle (3/0)	Preston (0/2)	–	5–0

(Note: figures in parentheses display the club's competition record as winners/runners-up.)

== See also ==
- Soccer in Australia
