= 1931 in Australian soccer =

Soccer in Australia
- Season: 1931

The 1931 season was the 48th season of regional competitive soccer in Australia.

== League competitions ==
Federation	Competition	Grand Final			Regular Season	
Federation	Competition	Winners	Score	Runners-up	Winners	Runners-up
Federal Capital Territory Soccer Football Association	FCTSA League	Not played			Not played	
Australian Soccer Association	NSW State League	Weston	4–2	Leichhardt Annandale	North: Weston Bears; South: Leichhardt Annandale	North: West Wallsend; South: St George
Queensland British Football Association	Brisbane Area League	Latrobe	4–0	YMCA	Latrobe	Norman Park
South Australian British Football Association	South Australia Division One	Not played			Port Adelaide	West Torrens
Tasmanian Soccer Association	Tasmania Division One	Cascades	2–1	Tamar	North: Tamar; South: Cascades	North: North Esk; South: Sandy Bay
Anglo-Australian Football Association	Victoria Division One	Not played			Brunswick	Royal Caledonians
Western Australian Soccer Football Association	Western Australia Division One	Not played			Victoria Park	Thistle

== Cup competitions ==
Federation	Competition	Winners	Runners-up	Venue	Result
Australian Soccer Association	NSW State Cup	West Wallsend (7/4)	Woonona (0/2)	Ibrox Park	3–0
South Australian British Football Association	South Australian Federation Cup	Lancashire (1/0)	Port Adelaide (1/3)		4–2 (R)
Tasmanian Soccer Association	Falkinder Cup	Sandy Bay (5/2)	South Hobart (5/4)		1–0
Anglo-Australian Football Association	Dockerty Cup	Wonthaggi Magpies (1/2)	Brunswick (0/1)		1–0

(Note: figures in parentheses display the club's competition record as winners/runners-up.)

== See also ==
- Soccer in Australia
