= 1921 in Australian soccer =

The 1921 season was the 38th season of regional competitive soccer in Australia.

== League competitions ==
Federation	Competition	Grand Final			Regular Season		
Federation	Competition	Champions	Score	Runners-up	Winners	Runners-up	Third place
Northern District British Football Association	Northern NSW Football League	West Wallsend Bluebells	2–0	Cessnock	West Wallsend Bluebells	Wallsend Royals	Weston
Australian Soccer Association	Sydney Metropolitan First Division	Pyrmont	Unknown		Pyrmont	Granville	Unknown
Queensland British Football Association	Brisbane Area League	Not played			Dinmore Bush Rats	Bundamba Rangers	Thistle
South Australian British Football Association	South Australia Division One	Not played			Cheltenham	North Adelaide	Sturt
Tasmanian Soccer Association	Tasmanian Division One	South Hobart	Unknown	Tamar	Unknown		
Anglo-Australian Football Association	Victorian League Division One	Not played			Windsor	Northumberland & Durham	Footscray Thistle
Western Australian Soccer Football Association	Western Australia Division One	Not played			Thistle	Claremont	Perth City United

== Cup competitions ==
Federation	Competition	Winners	Runners-up	Venue	Result
Northern District British Football Association	Ellis Cup	West Wallsend Bluebells	Cessnock	–	2–0
New South Wales British Football Association	Gardiner Challenge Cup	West Wallsend (3/3)	Granvile (2/3)	–	3–1
South Australian British Football Association	South Australia Federation Cup	South Adelaide	Cheltenham	–	3–2
Tasmanian Soccer Association	Falkinder Cup	South Hobart	Hobart	–	2–0
Anglo-Australian Football Association	Dockerty Cup	Northumberland & Durham United (2/0)	Submarine Depot (0/1)	–	2–0 (R)

(Note: figures in parentheses display the club's competition record as winners/runners-up.)

== See also ==
- Soccer in Australia
