= 1919 in Australian soccer =

The 1919 season was the 36th season of regional competitive soccer in Australia.

== League competitions ==
Federation	Competition	Grand Final			Regular Season		
Federation	Competition	Champions	Score	Runners-up	Winners	Runners-up	Third place
Northern District British Football Association	Northern NSW Football League	West Wallsend Bluebells	4–1	Hamilton	West Wallsend Bluebells	Adamstown Rosebud	Minmi
New South Wales British Football Association	Sydney Metropolitan First Division	Balmain Fernleigh	4–0	Pyrmont	Balmain Fernleigh	Pyrmont	Canterbury
Queensland British Football Association	Brisbane Area League	Not played			Pineapple Rovers	Merthyr Thistles	Play-off
South Australian British Football Association	South Australia Division One	Not played			North Adelaide	Sturt	Cheltenham
Anglo-Australian Football Association	Victorian League Division One	Not played			Northumberland & Durham United	Footscray Thistle	Windsor
Western Australian Soccer Football Association	Western Australia Division One	Not played			Claremont	Perth City United	Thistle

== Cup competitions ==
Federation	Competition	Winners	Runners-up	Venue	Result
Northern District British Football Association	Ellis Challenge Cup	West Wallsend	Hamilton	–	4–0
New South Wales British Football Association	Gardiner Challenge Cup	Balmain Fernleigh (1/0)	West Wallsend (2/3)	–	3–0
South Australian British Football Association	South Australia Federation Cup	Sturt (1/1)		–	1–1
Tasmanian Soccer Association	Falkinder Cup	South Hobart	Spartans	–	4–2
Anglo-Australian Football Association	Dockerty Cup	Footscray Thistle (1/0)	Windsor (0/1)	–	2–0

(Note: figures in parentheses display the club's competition record as winners/runners-up.)

== See also ==
- Soccer in Australia
