= 1913 in Australian soccer =

The 1913 season was the 30th season of regional competitive soccer in Australia.

== League competitions ==
Federation	Competition	Grand Final			Regular Season		
Federation	Competition	Champions	Score	Runners-up	Winners	Runners-up	Third place
Northern District British Football Association	Northern NSW Football League	West Wallsend	2–1	Merewether Advance	Merewether Advance	West Wallsend	Cesnock
New South Wales British Football Association	Sydney Metropolitan First Division	Newtown	Unknown		Newton	Balmain	Leichhardt-Annandale
Queensland British Football Association	Brisbane Area League	Unknown			Bulimba Rangers	Wellingtons	Eskgroves
South Australian British Football Association	South Australia Division One	Not played			Hindmarsh	Cheltenham	Tandanya
Anglo-Australian Football Association	Victorian Amateur League	Not played			Yarraville	Burns	Thistle
Western Australian Soccer Football Association	Western Australia Division One	Not played			City United	Austral	Claremont

== Cup competitions ==
Federation	Competition	Winners	Runners-up	Venue	Result
Northern District British Football Association	Ellis Challenge Cup	Merewether Advance	Weston	–	2–1
New South Wales British Football Association	Gardiner Challenge Cup	Annandale (1/0)	Newtown (0/1)	–	3–0
South Australian British Football Association	South Australia Federation Cup	Adelaide (2/0)	Hindmarsh (2/2)	–	3–0
Anglo-Australian Football Association	Dockerty Cup	Yarraville (2/1)	St Kilda (2/2)	–	4–3

(Note: figures in parentheses display the club's competition record as winners/runners-up.)

== See also ==
- Soccer in Australia
