= 1920 in Australian soccer =

The 1920 season was the 37th season of regional competitive soccer in Australia.

== League competitions ==
Federation	Competition	Grand Final			Regular Season		
Federation	Competition	Champions	Score	Runners-up	Winners	Runners-up	Third place
Northern District British Football Association	Northern NSW Football League	Adamstown Rosebud	1–0	Wallsend	West Wallsend Bluebells	Adamstown Rosebud	Weston
New South Wales British Football Association	Sydney Metropolitan First Division	Balmain Fernleigh	Unknown		Balmain Fernleigh	Canterbury	Eastern Suburbs
Queensland British Football Association	Brisbane Area League	Not played			Corinthians	Thistle	Pineapple Rovers
South Australian British Football Association	South Australia Division One	Not played			Cheltenham	North Adelaide	Sturt
Tasmanian Soccer Association	Tasmanian Division One	South Hobart	Unknown	Elphin	Unknown		
Anglo-Australian Football Association	Victorian League Division One	Not played			Northumberland & Durham United	St Kilda	Play-off
Western Australian Soccer Football Association	Western Australia Division One	Not played			Perth City United	Claremont	Thistle

== Cup competitions ==
Federation	Competition	Winners	Runners-up	Venue	Result
Northern District British Football Association	Ellis Cup	West Wallsend Bluebells	Adamstown Rosebud	–	3–2
New South Wales British Football Association	Gardiner Challenge Cup	Balmain Fernleigh (2/0)	Granvile (2/2)	–	2–0
South Australian British Football Association	South Australia Federation Cup	Cheltenham	South Adelaide	–	2–1
Tasmanian Soccer Association	Falkinder Cup	Corinthians	St George	–	5–1 (R)
Anglo-Australian Football Association	Dockerty Cup	Northumberland & Durham United (1/0); Albert Park (1/0)		–	–

(Note: figures in parentheses display the club's competition record as winners/runners-up.)

== See also ==
- Soccer in Australia
