= 1936 in Australian soccer =

Soccer in Australia
- Season: 1936

The 1936 season was the 53rd season of regional competitive soccer in Australia.

== National teams ==
=== Australia men's national soccer team ===
Australia played their first test match of their 1936 tour against New Zealand on 4 July at Logan Park in Dunedin. Six players made their international debut; Ray Bryant, Alec Forrest, Jim Harden, Billy Price, Vic Sharp and Jim Wilkins in which Australia won 7–1 with George Smith scoring four goals (the first time a player had scored four goals for Australia), Billy Price with two goals, and captain Alec Cameron with one.

The following week, the two sides met again on 11 July at Basin Reserve in Wellington, where Australia won 10–0; a record win at the time for them (and would hold the record until equalling in 1981 against Fiji also winning 10–0). George Smith again scored a record number of goals in a match for Australia scoring five, with Billy Price scoring two, Alec Cameron with two and Donaldson scoring his first international goal.

The third and final match of the 1936 series between the two sides was played in the following week on 18 July at Blandford Park in Auckland. Australia won 4–1; winning three of the three test matches against New Zealand as Alec Cameron and Billy Price both scored two goals.

==== Results and fixtures ====
===== Friendlies =====
4 July International Friendly	New Zealand	1–7	Australia	Dunedin, New Zealand
	Skinner ?' (pen.)	Report	Smith ?', ?', ?', ?'; Price ?', ?'; Cameron ?'	Stadium: Logan Park; Attendance: 8,000; Referee: W.P. Smith (New Zealand)

11 July International Friendly	New Zealand	0–10	Australia	Wellington, New Zealand
		Report	Smith 32', ?', 53', ?', ?'; Price 9', ?'; Cameron 28', 48'; Donaldson ?'	Stadium: Basin Reserve; Attendance: 8,000; Referee: G. Jackson (New Zealand)

18 July International Friendly	New Zealand	1–4	Australia	Auckland, New Zealand
	Haggett ?'	Report	Cameron ?', ?'; Price ?', ?'	Stadium: Blandford Park; Attendance: 2,000; Referee: A. Firth (New Zealand)

==== Player statistics ====
Pos.	Player	Apps	Goals
GK	Jimmy McNabb	3	0
FB	Jack Evans	3	0
HB	Ray Bryant	3	0
HB	Jim Harden	3	0
HB	Jimmy Osborne	3	0
HB	Vic Sharp	2	0
FW	Alec Cameron	3	4
FW	Jim Donaldson	2	1
FW	Alec Forrest	2	0
FW	Billy Price	3	6
FW	George Smith	3	9
FW	Jim Wilkinson	3	0

== See also ==
- Soccer in Australia
