= 1930 in Australian soccer =

Soccer in Australia
- Season: 1930

The 1930 season was the 47th season of regional competitive soccer in Australia.

== League competitions ==
Federation	Competition	Grand Final			Regular Season		
Federation	Competition	Winners	Score	Runners-up	Winners	Runners-up	Third place
Federal Capital Territory Soccer Football Association	FCTSA League	Not played			Not played		
Australian Soccer Association	NSW State League	Not played			Adamstown Rosebud	Gladesville Ryde	Cessnock
Queensland British Football Association	Brisbane Area League	Not played			Latrobe	Pineapple Rovers	YMCA
South Australian British Football Association	South Australia Division One	Not played			West Adelaide	South Australia Railways	West Torrens
Tasmanian Soccer Association	Tasmanian Division One	Patons and Baldwin	3–0	Hobart Athletic	North: Patons and Baldwin; South: Hobart Athletic	North: Invermay; South: South Hobart	North: North Esk; South: Navy Athletic
Anglo-Australian Football Association	Victoria Division One	Not played			Footscray Thistle	Royal Caledonians	Melbourne Thistle
Western Australian Soccer Football Association	Western Australia Division One	Not played			Northern Casuals	Caledonian	Victoria Park

== Cup competitions ==
Federation	Competition	Winners	Runners-up	Venue	Result
Australian Soccer Association	NSW State Cup Series	Adamstown Rosebud (1/0)	Cessnock (1/1)		2–0
South Australian British Football Association	South Australian Federation Cup	South Australian Railways (1/1)	Port Adelaide (1/3)	–	3–2 (a.e.t.)
Tasmanian Soccer Association	Falkinder Cup	Hobart Athletic (2/2)	Sandy Bay (4/2)	–	3–2
Anglo-Australian Football Association	Dockerty Cup	Footscray Thistle (4/1)	Royal Caledonians (0/1)	–	3–2

(Note: figures in parentheses display the club's competition record as winners/runners-up.)

== See also ==
- Soccer in Australia
