= 1898 in Australian soccer =

The 1898 season was the 15th season of regional competitive soccer in Australia and the Australian colonies.

== League competitions ==
Federation	Competition	Grand Final			Regular Season		
Federation	Competition	Champions	Score	Runners-up	Premiers	Runners-up	Third place
Northern District British Football Association	Northern NSW Football League	West Wallsend Bluebells	2–0	Minmi Rangers	West Wallsend Bluebells	Minmi Rangers	Newcastle West
South British Football Soccer Association	Sydney Metropolitan First Division	Pyrmont Volunteer	2–0	Balmain	Pyrmont Volunteer	Balmain	Pyrmont Rangers
Queensland British Football Association	Brisbane Area League	Not played			Dinmore Bush Rats	Ipswich Rovers	—
Western Australian Soccer Football Association	Western Australia Division One	Not played			Civil Service	Fremantle Wanderers	Perth FC

== Cup competitions ==
Federation	Competition	Winners	Runners-up	Venue	Result
Northern District British Football Association	Ellis Cup	Minmi Rangers	Newcastle West	–	Forfeit
South British Football Soccer Association	Gardiner Challenge Cup	Volunteers (1/0)	West Newcastle (0/1)	–	3–2

(Note: figures in parentheses display the club's competition record as winners/runners-up.)

== See also ==
- Soccer in Australia
