= 1932 in Australian soccer =

Soccer in Australia
- Season: 1932

The 1932 season was the 49th season of regional competitive soccer in Australia.

== League competitions ==
Federation	Competition	Grand Final			Regular Season	
Federation	Competition	Winners	Score	Runners-up	Winners	Runners-up
Federal Capital Territory Soccer Football Association	FCTSA League	Not played			Not played	
Australian Soccer Association	NSW State League	Wallsend	9–1	Concord	North: Wallsend; South: Concord	North: Weston; South: St George
Queensland British Football Association	Brisbane Area League	Not played			Latrobe	YMCA
South Australian British Football Association	South Australia Division One	Not played			West Torrens	Port Adelaide
Tasmanian Soccer Association	Tasmania Division One	Cascades	8–3	Tamar	North: Tamar; South: Cascades	North: North Esk; South: Sandy Bay
Anglo-Australian Football Association	Victoria Division One	Not played			Footscray Thistle	Royal Caledonians
Western Australian Soccer Football Association	Western Australia Division One	Not played			Northern Casuals	Victoria Park

== Cup competitions ==
Federation	Competition	Winners	Runners-up	Venue	Result
Australian Soccer Association	NSW State Cup	Weston (1/2)	Adamstown Rosebud (2/2)		8–1
South Australian British Football Association	South Australian Federation Cup	South Australian Railways (2/1)	Lancashire (1/1)		2–0 (R)
Tasmanian Soccer Association	Falkinder Cup	Cascades (1/0)	Navy Athletic (0/1)		1–0
Anglo-Australian Football Association	Dockerty Cup	Footscray Thistle (5/0)	Melbourne Thistle (3/1)		2–1

(Note: figures in parentheses display the club's competition record as winners/runners-up.)

== See also ==
- Soccer in Australia
