= 1934 in Australian soccer =

Soccer in Australia
- Season: 1934

The 1934 season was the 51st season of regional competitive soccer in Australia.

== League competitions ==
Federation	Competition	Grand Final			Regular Season	
Federation	Competition	Winners	Score	Runners-up	Winners	Runners-up
Federal Capital Territory Soccer Football Association	FCTSA League	Not played			Not played	
Australian Soccer Association	NSW State League	Not played			Adamstown Rosebud	Metters
Queensland British Football Association	Brisbane Area League	Not played			Brisbane YMCA	Shafston Rovers
South Australian British Football Association	South Australia Division One	Not played			Port Thistle	West Torrens
Tasmanian Soccer Association	Tasmania Division One	Cascades	9–3	Tamar	North: Tamar; South: Cascades	North: Thistle; South: Sandy Bay
Anglo-Australian Football Association	Victoria Division One	Not played			Melbourne Hakoah	Royal Caledonians
Western Australian Soccer Football Association	Western Australia Division One	Not played			Victoria Park	Caledonian

== Cup competitions ==
Federation	Competition	Winners	Runners-up	Venue	Result
Australian Soccer Association	NSW State Cup	Weston (2/0)	Adamstown Rosebud (1/2)		5–1
South Australian British Football Association	South Australian Federation Cup	Port Thistle (1/0)	West Torrens (4/2)		3–2
Tasmanian Soccer Association	Falkinder Cup	Cascades (2/1)	Sandy Bay (5/3)		4–3
Anglo-Australian Football Association	Dockerty Cup	Royal Caledonians (1/1)	Melbourne Hakoah (0/1)		3–2 (R)

(Note: figures in parentheses display the club's competition record as winners/runners-up.)

== See also ==
- Soccer in Australia
