= 1897 in Australian soccer =

The 1897 season was the 14th season of regional competitive soccer in Australia and the Australian colonies.

== League competitions ==
Federation	Competition	Grand Final			Regular Season		
Federation	Competition	Champions	Score	Runners-up	Premiers	Runners-up	Third place
Northern District British Football Association	Northern NSW Football League	West Wallsend Bluebells	1–0	Wallsend Rovers	West Wallsend Bluebells	Minmi Rangers	Adamstown Rosebud
South British Football Soccer Association	Sydney Metropolitan First Division	Balmain	3–2	Apsley	Balmain	Apsley	Pyrmont Rangers
Queensland British Football Association	Brisbane Area League	Not played			Rosebank	Ipswich Rovers	—
Western Australian Soccer Football Association	Western Australia Division One	Not played			Fremantle Wanderers	Civil Service	Cottesloe

== Cup competitions ==
Federation	Competition	Winners	Runners-up	Venue	Result
Northern District British Football Association	Ellis Cup	Minmi Rangers	Adamstown Rosebud	–	3–1 (R)
South British Football Soccer Association	Gardiner Challenge Cup	Balmain (3/0)	Pyrmont Rangers (4/5)	–	2–1

(Note: figures in parentheses display the club's competition record as winners/runners-up.)

== See also ==
- Soccer in Australia
