= 1912 in Australian soccer =

The 1912 season was the 29th season of regional competitive soccer in Australia.

== League competitions ==
Federation	Competition	Grand Final			Regular Season		
Federation	Competition	Champions	Score	Runners-up	Winners	Runners-up	Third place
Northern District British Football Association	Northern NSW Football League	Cessnock	1–0	West Wallsend	Cessnock	West Wallsend	Adamstown Rosebud
New South Wales British Football Association	Sydney Metropolitan First Division	Sydney	1–0	Balmain	Balmain	Sydney	Glebe
Queensland British Football Association	Brisbane Area League	Unknown			Blackstone Rovers	Bulimba Rangers	Unknown
South Australian British Football Association	South Australia Division One	Not played			Port Adelaide	Adelaide	Hindmarsh
Anglo-Australian Football Association	Victorian Amateur League	Not played			Williamstown-Yarraville	Burns	Carlton United
Western Australian Soccer Football Association	Western Australia Division One	Not played			Claremont	Fremantle	City United

== Cup competitions ==
Federation	Competition	Winners	Runners-up	Venue	Result
Northern District British Football Association	Ellis Challenge Cup	Cessnock	West Wallsend Bluebells	–	1–0 (R)
New South Wales British Football Association	Gardiner Challenge Cup	Balmain (5/0)	Sydney (0/1)	–	1–0
South Australian British Football Association	South Australia Federation Cup	Adelaide (1/0)	Tandanya (0/1)	–	2–1
Anglo-Australian Football Association	Dockerty Cup	Yarraville (2/1)	Wonthaggi Rangers (0/1)	–	4–3

(Note: figures in parentheses display the club's competition record as winners/runners-up.)

== See also ==
- Soccer in Australia
