= 1895 in Australian soccer =

The 1895 season was the twelfth season of regional competitive soccer in Australia and the Australian colonies. There were three league competitions fielded by Northern District British Football Association (Northern NSW), South British Football Soccer Association (New South Wales) and Queensland British Football Association. and two cup competitions.

== League competitions ==
Federation	Competition	Grand Final			Regular Season		
Federation	Competition	Champions	Score	Runners-up	Premiers	Runners-up	Third place
Northern District British Football Association	Northern NSW Football League	Adamstown Rosebud	–	–	Adamstown Rosebud	Wallsend Rovers	Minmi Rangers
South British Football Soccer Association	Sydney Metropolitan First Division	Not played			Pyrmont Rangers	Sydney Thistles	Balmain Fernleigh
Queensland British Football Association	Brisbane Area League	Not played			Dinmore Bush Rats	Normans	—

== Cup competitions ==
Federation	Competition	Winners	Runners-up	Venue	Result
Northern District British Football Association	Ellis Cup	Minmi Rangers	Adamstown Rosebud	–	1–1 (3–2p)
South British Football Soccer Association	Gardiner Challenge Cup	Balmain (1/0)	Pyrmont Rangers (4/3)	–	4–1

(Note: figures in parentheses display the club's competition record as winners/runners-up.)

== See also ==
- Soccer in Australia
