= 1905 in Australian soccer =

The 1905 season was the 22nd season of regional competitive soccer in Australia.

== League competitions ==
Federation	Competition	Grand Final			Regular Season		
Federation	Competition	Champions	Score	Runners-up	Premiers	Runners-up	Third place
Northern District British Football Association	Northern NSW Football League	Not played			West Wallsend Bluebells	Adamstown Rosebud	Wallsend Royals
South British Football Soccer Association	Sydney Metropolitan First Division	Pyrmont	–	–	Pyrmont	Rozelle	Glebe
Queensland British Football Association	Brisbane Area League	Unknown			Wellingtons	Eskgroves	–
South Australian British Football Association	South Australia Division One	Not played			Hindmarsh	–	–
Western Australian Soccer Football Association	Western Australia Division One	Not played			Perth FC	Civil Service	Ex-Students

== Cup competitions ==
Federation	Competition	Winners	Runners-up	Venue	Result
Northern District British Football Association	Ellis Cup	Adamstown Rosebud (4/6)	Adamstown Shamrocks (0/1)	–	7–3
South British Football Soccer Association	Gardiner Challenge Cup	Balmain (4/0)	Rozelle (0/1)	–	2–1 (R)

(Note: figures in parentheses display the club's competition record as winners/runners-up.)

== See also ==
- Soccer in Australia
