= 1917 in Australian soccer =

The 1917 season was the 34th season of regional competitive soccer in Australia.

== League competitions ==
Federation	Competition	Grand Final			Regular Season		
Federation	Competition	Champions	Score	Runners-up	Winners	Runners-up	Third place
Northern District British Football Association	Northern NSW Football League	Wallsend	2–0	Weston Albion	Weston Albion; West Wallsend		Wallsend
New South Wales British Football Association	Sydney Metropolitan First Division	Leichhardt-Annandale	Unknown		Leichhardt-Annandale	Drummoyne	Navy

== Cup competitions ==
Federation	Competition	Winners	Runners-up	Venue	Result
Northern District British Football Association	Ellis Challenge Cup	Wallsend	Weston Albion	–	1–0

(Note: figures in parentheses display the club's competition record as winners/runners-up.)

== See also ==
- Soccer in Australia
