= 1904 in Australian soccer =

The 1904 season was the 21st season of regional competitive soccer in Australia.

== League competitions ==
Federation	Competition	Grand Final			Regular Season		
Federation	Competition	Champions	Score	Runners-up	Premiers	Runners-up	Third place
Northern District British Football Association	Northern NSW Football League	Not played			West Wallsend Bluebells	Adamstown Rosebud	Wallsend Royals
South British Football Soccer Association	New South Wales British Football Association	Granville	–	–	Granville	Rozelle	Balmain
Queensland British Football Association	Brisbane Area League	Unknown			Blackstone Rovers	Dinmore Bush Rats	–
South Australian British Football Association	South Australia Division One	Not played			Woodville	–	–
Western Australian Soccer Football Association	Western Australia Division One	Not played			Corinthian	Perth FC	Civil Service

== Cup competitions ==
Federation	Competition	Winners	Runners-up	Venue	Result
Northern District British Football Association	Ellis Cup	Abandoned			
South British Football Soccer Association	Gardiner Challenge Cup	Granville (1/1)	Glebe (0/2)	–	2–1

(Note: figures in parentheses display the club's competition record as winners/runners-up.)

== See also ==
- Soccer in Australia
