= 1915 in Australian soccer =

The 1915 season was the 32nd season of regional competitive soccer in Australia.

== League competitions ==
Federation	Competition	Grand Final			Regular Season		
Federation	Competition	Champions	Score	Runners-up	Winners	Runners-up	Third place
Northern District British Football Association	Northern NSW Football League	Merewether Advance	Unknown		Unknown		
New South Wales British Football Association	Sydney Metropolitan First Division	Granville	Unknown		Granville	Pyrmont	Leichhardt-Annandale
Queensland British Football Association	Brisbane Area League	Not played			Corinthians	Brisbane City	Bulimba Rangers
South Australian British Football Association	South Australia Division One	Not played			Cheltenham	Hindmarsh	North Adelaide
Anglo-Australian Football Association	Victorian League Division One	Not played			Melbourne Thistle	Albert Park	Play-off
Western Australian Soccer Football Association	Western Australia Division One	Not played			Thistle	Claremont	Perth FC

== Cup competitions ==
Federation	Competition	Winners	Runners-up	Venue	Result
Northern District British Football Association	Ellis Challenge Cup	Merewether Advance	West Wallsend Bluebells	–	3–2
New South Wales British Football Association	Gardiner Challenge Cup	Balmain (7/0)	West Wallsend (2/1)	–	2–0
South Australian British Football Association	South Australia Federation Cup	Hindmarsh (3/3)	Cheltenham (0/1)	–	4–1
Anglo-Australian Football Association	Dockerty Cup	Melbourne Thistle (2/0)	Albert Park (0/1)	–	2–0 (R)

(Note: figures in parentheses display the club's competition record as winners/runners-up.)

== See also ==
- Soccer in Australia
