= 1914 in Australian soccer =

The 1914 season was the 31st season of regional competitive soccer in Australia.

== League competitions ==
Federation	Competition	Grand Final			Regular Season		
Federation	Competition	Champions	Score	Runners-up	Winners	Runners-up	Third place
Northern District British Football Association	Northern NSW Football League	Merewether Advance	3–0 (R)	West Wallsend Bluebells	Merewether Advance	Weston	West Wallsend Bluebells
New South Wales British Football Association	Sydney Metropolitan First Division	Granville	Unknown		Granville	Balmain	Sydney
Queensland British Football Association	Brisbane Area League	Unknown			Toowong Caledonians	Unknown	
South Australian British Football Association	South Australia Division One	Not played			North Adelaide	Hindmarsh	Adelaide
Anglo-Australian Football Association	Victorian Amateur League	Not played			Melbourne Thistle	Birmingham	St Kilda
Western Australian Soccer Football Association	Western Australia Division One	Not played			Thistle	Training College	Claremont

== Cup competitions ==
Federation	Competition	Winners	Runners-up	Venue	Result
Northern District British Football Association	Ellis Challenge Cup	Merewether Advance	Weston	–	1–0
New South Wales British Football Association	Gardiner Challenge Cup	Granville (2/1)	Merewether Advance (0/1)	–	3–0
South Australian British Football Association	South Australia Federation Cup	Adelaide (3/0)	Hindmarsh (2/3)	–	2–1
Anglo-Australian Football Association	Dockerty Cup	Melbourne Thistle (1/0)	Northumberland & Durham United (0/1)	–	Shared

(Note: figures in parentheses display the club's competition record as winners/runners-up.)

== See also ==
- Soccer in Australia
