= 1888 in Australian soccer =

The 1888 season was the fifth season of regional competitive soccer in Australia and the Australian colonies. There were two league competitions fielded by Northern District British Football Association (Northern NSW) and the South British Football Soccer Association (New South Wales) and three cup competitions.

== League competitions ==
Competition	Winners	Runners-up	Third place
Northern NSW Football League	Minmi Rangers (3/0)	—	—
Sydney Badge Series	Caledonians (4/0)	—	—

(Note: figures in parentheses display the club's competition record as winners/runners-up.)

== Cup competitions ==
Federation	Competition	Winners	Runners-up	Venue	Result
Northern District British Football Association	Ellis Cup	Minmi Rangers (3/0)	Burwood United (0/1)	–	3–1
South British Football Soccer Association	Gardiner Challenge Cup	Caledonian (1/0)	Parkgrove (0/1)	–	4–2
Anglo-Australian Football Association	George Challenge Cup	Carlton (2/0)	Melbourne Rovers (0/2)	South Melbourne Cricket Ground	4–1

(Note: figures in parentheses display the club's competition record as winners/runners-up.)

== See also ==
- Soccer in Australia
