= 1900 in Australian soccer =

The 1900 season was the 17th season of regional competitive soccer in Australia and the Australian colonies.

== League competitions ==
| Federation | Competition | Grand Final | | | Regular Season | | |
| Federation | Competition | Champions | Score | Runners-up | Premiers | Runners-up | Third place |
|---|---|---|---|---|---|---|---|
| Northern District British Football Association | Northern NSW Football League | Wallsend Rovers | 5–2 | West Wallsend Bluebells | Wallsend Rovers | West Wallsend Bluebells | Adamstown Rosebud |
| South British Football Soccer Association | Sydney Metropolitan First Division | Pyrmont Volunteer | 2–2 | Pyrmont Rangers | Pyrmont Rangers | Pyrmont Volunteer | Balmain Albion |
| Queensland British Football Association | Brisbane Area League | Not played | | | Dinmore Bush Rats | Blackstone Rovers | — |
| Western Australian Soccer Football Association | Western Australia Division One | Not played | | | Fremantle Wanderers | Casuals | Civil Service |

== Cup competitions ==
| Federation | Competition | Winners | Runners-up | Venue | Result |
|---|---|---|---|---|---|
| Northern District British Football Association | Ellis Cup | West Wallsend Bluebells | Adamstown Rosebud | – | 5–1 |
| South British Football Soccer Association | Gardiner Challenge Cup | West Wallsend (1/0) | Volunteers (0/1) | – | 3–3 (4–1 pen.) |

(Note: figures in parentheses display the club's competition record as winners/runners-up.)

== See also ==
- Soccer in Australia
