= 1968 in Australian soccer =

Soccer in Australia
- Season: 1968

Men's soccer
- Australia Cup: Sydney Hakoah

The 1968 season was the seventh season of national competitive soccer in Australia and 85th overall.

== National teams ==
=== Australia national soccer team ===
==== Results and fixtures ====
===== Friendlies =====
30 March 1968	Australia	2–2	Japan	Sydney, Australia
	McColl 47'; Blue 84'	Report	Kamamoto 18', 65'	Stadium: Sydney Sports Ground; Attendance: 12,646

31 March 1968	Australia	3–1	Japan	Melbourne, Australia
	Scheinflug 33'; Vojtek 42'; Baartz 89'	Report	Kuwahara 31'	Stadium: Olympic Park Stadium; Attendance: 9,974

4 April 1968	Australia	1–3	Japan	Adelaide, Australia
	McColl 70'	Report	Sugiyama 82'; Kamamoto 85', 89'	Stadium: Norwood Oval; Attendance: 6,127

== Cup competitions ==
=== Australia Cup ===
The competition began on 29 March 1968. Nineteen clubs had entered the competition with the final two clubs Sydney Hakoah and Melbourne Hakoah qualifying for the Final. Sydney Hakoah won 6–1 on aggregate over Melbourne Hakoah.

=== Final ===
==== First leg ====
27 October 1968

Sydney Hakoah	3–0	Melbourne Hakoah
Baartz 15', 24'; Rutherford 84'	Report

Wentworth Park, Sydney
Attendance: 3,402
Referee: M. O'Malley

==== Second leg ====
3 November 1968

Melbourne Hakoah	1–3	Sydney Hakoah
Thomas ?'	Report	Rutherford 57', ?'; Baartz 89'

Middle Park, Melbourne
Attendance: 2,850
Referee: M. O'Malley
