= 1899 in Australian soccer =

The 1899 season was the 16th season of regional competitive soccer in Australia and the Australian colonies.

== League competitions ==
Federation	Competition	Grand Final			Regular Season		
Federation	Competition	Champions	Score	Runners-up	Premiers	Runners-up	Third place
Northern District British Football Association	Northern NSW Football League	West Wallsend Bluebells	1–0	Adamstown Rosebud	West Wallsend Bluebells	Adamstown Rosebud	West Wallsend Bluebells B
South British Football Soccer Association	Sydney Metropolitan First Division	Balmain	4–0	Pyrmont Volunteer	Pyrmont Volunteer	Balmain	Pyrmont Rangers
Queensland British Football Association	Brisbane Area League	Not played			Dinmore Bush Rats	—	—
Western Australian Soccer Football Association	Western Australia Division One	Not played			Perth FC	Fremantle Wanderers	Civil Service

== Cup competitions ==
Federation	Competition	Winners	Runners-up	Venue	Result
Northern District British Football Association	Ellis Cup	West Wallsend Bluebells	Adamstown Rosebud	–	1–0
South British Football Soccer Association	Gardiner Challenge Cup	Pyrmont Rangers (5/5)	Balgownie (0/1)	–	5–2

(Note: figures in parentheses display the club's competition record as winners/runners-up.)

== See also ==
- Soccer in Australia
