= 1887 in Australian soccer =

The 1887 season was the fourth season of regional competitive soccer in Australia and the Australian colonies. There were two league competitions played by Northern District British Football Association (Northern NSW) and the South British Football Soccer Association (New South Wales) and three cup competitions.

== League competitions ==
Competition	Winners	Runners-up	Third place
Northern NSW Football League	Minmi Rangers (2/0)	—	—
Sydney Badge Series	Caledonians (3/0)	—	—

(Note: figures in parentheses display the club's competition record as winners/runners-up.)

== Cup competitions ==
Federation	Competition	Winners	Runners-up	Venue	Result
Northern District British Football Association	Ellis Cup	Minmi Rangers (2/0)	—	—	—
South British Football Soccer Association	Rainsford Trophy	Hamilton Athletic (1/0)	Granville (2/1)	—	4–1
Anglo-Australian Football Association	George Challenge Cup	Prahran (1/1)	Melbourne Rovers (0/1)	Carlton Cricket Ground	5–1

(Note: figures in parentheses display the club's competition record as winners/runners-up.)

== See also ==
- Soccer in Australia
