= 1893 in Australian soccer =

The 1893 season was the tenth season of regional competitive soccer in Australia and the Australian colonies. There were two league competitions and two cup competitions fielded by Northern District British Football Association (Northern NSW) and the South British Football Soccer Association (New South Wales).

== League competitions ==
| Federation | Competition | Winners | Runners-up | Third place |
|---|---|---|---|---|
| Northern District British Football Association | Northern NSW Football League | Minmi Rangers | Burwood United | Wallsend Rovers |
| South British Football Soccer Association | Sydney Metropolitan First Division | Pyrmont Rangers | Sydney Thistles | Balmain Fernleigh |

== Cup competitions ==
| Federation | Competition | Winners | Runners-up | Venue | Result |
|---|---|---|---|---|---|
| Northern District British Football Association | Ellis Cup | Minmi Rangers | Adamstown Rosebud | – | 4–1 |
| South British Football Soccer Association | Gardiner Challenge Cup | Pyrmont Rangers (3/2) | Minmi Rangers (1/1) | – | 1–0 |

(Note: figures in parentheses display the club's competition record as winners/runners-up.)

== See also ==
- Soccer in Australia
