= 1969 in Australian soccer =

The 1969 season was the 79th season of regional competitive soccer in Australia and 86th overall.

== National teams ==
=== Australia national soccer team ===
==== Results and fixtures ====
===== Friendlies =====
19 July 1969	Australia	1–0	Greece	Sydney, Australia
	Abonyi 60' (pen.)	Report		Stadium: Sydney Cricket Ground; Attendance: 30,155; Referee: Tony Boskovic (Australia)

23 July 1969	Australia	2–2	Greece	Brisbane, Australia
	Vojtek 48'; Baartz 62'	Report	Dedes 19', 46'	Stadium: Brisbane Showgrounds; Attendance: 10,037; Referee: Harold Parsons (Australia)

27 July 1969	Australia	0–2	Greece	Melbourne, Australia
		Report	Dedes 22'; Papaioannou 55'	Stadium: Olympic Park; Attendance: 24,416; Referee: Vince Dobinson (Australia)

===== 1970 FIFA World Cup qualification =====
====== First round ======
Pos	Team	Pld	W	D	L	GF	GA	GD	Pts
1	Australia	4	2	2	0	7	4	+3	6
2	South Korea	4	1	2	1	6	5	+1	4
3	Japan	4	0	2	2	4	8	−4	2

10 October 1969	Australia	3–1	Japan	Seoul, South Korea
	McColl 5'; Ogi 68' (o.g.); Baartz 69'	Report	Watanabe 11'	Stadium: Dongdaemun Stadium; Attendance: 10,500; Referee: Patrick Nice (Malaysia)

14 October 1969	Australia	2–1	South Korea	Seoul, South Korea
	Watkiss 39'; McColl 82'	Report	Lee-woo 45'	Stadium: Dongdaemun Stadium; Attendance: 25,000; Referee: G. Suppiah (Singapore)

16 October 1969	Japan	1–1	Australia	Seoul, South Korea
	Miyamoto 4'	Report	McColl 39'	Stadium: Dongdaemun Stadium; Attendance: 6,000; Referee: Wanchai Suvaree (Thailand)

18 October 1969	South Korea	1–1	Australia	Seoul, South Korea
	Soo-il 35'	Report	Baartz 58'	Stadium: Dongdaemun Stadium; Attendance: 25,000; Referee: Patrick Nice (Malaysia)

====== Second round ======
Pos	Team	Pld	W	D	L	GF	GA	GD	Pts
1=	Australia	2	0	2	0	1	1	0	2
1=	Rhodesia	2	0	2	0	1	1	0	2

23 November 1969	Rhodesia	1–1	Australia	Laurenco Marques, Mozambique
	Chalmers 63'	Report	McColl 68'	Stadium: Salazar Stadium; Attendance: 6,500; Referee: Antônio Saldanha Ribeiro (Portugal)

27 November 1969	Rhodesia	0–0	Australia	Laurenco Marques, Mozambique
		Report		Stadium: Salazar Stadium; Attendance: 3,500; Referee: Antônio Saldanha Ribeiro (Portugal)

27 November 1969	Rhodesia	1–3	Australia	Laurenco Marques, Mozambique
	Chalmers 49'	Report	Rutherford 12'; Tigere 22' (o.g.); Warren 56'	Stadium: Salazar Stadium; Attendance: 1,500; Referee: Antônio Saldanha Ribeiro (Portugal)

====== Final round ======
4 December 1969	Israel	1–0	Australia	Ramat Gan, Israel
	Spiegler 18'	Report		Stadium: Ramat Gan Stadium; Attendance: 41,899; Referee: Ferdinand Marschall (Austria)

14 December 1969	Australia	1–1	Israel	Sydney, Australia
	Watkiss 88'	Report	Spiegler 78'	Stadium: Sydney Sports Ground; Attendance: 41,899; Referee: Ferdinand Marschall (Austria)

== League competitions ==
Federation	Competition	Grand Final			Regular Season		
Federation	Competition	Champions	Score	Runners-up	Premiers	Runners-up	Third place
ACT Soccer Federation	ACT Division One	Match abandoned			Croatia-Deakin	Queanbeyan Macedonia	Forrest United
New South Wales Federation of Soccer Clubs	NSW Federation Division One	APIA Leichhardt	3–2	St George-Budapest	South Coast United	St George-Budapest	Hakoah Eastern Suburbs

== See also ==
- Soccer in Australia
