= 1918 in Australian soccer =

1918 in Australian soccer was the 35th season of regional competitive soccer in Australia.

== League competitions ==
Federation	Competition	Grand Final			Regular Season		
Federation	Competition	Champions	Score	Runners-up	Winners	Runners-up	Third place
Northern District British Football Association	Northern NSW Football League	Wallsend	4–0	Adamstown Rosebud	Wallsend	West Wallsend Bluebells	Adamstown Rosebud
New South Wales British Football Association	Sydney Metropolitan First Division	Balmain Fernleigh	4–0	Pyrmont	Pyrmont	Balmain Kiaora	Balmain Fernleigh

== Cup competitions ==
Federation	Competition	Winners	Runners-up	Venue	Result
Northern District British Football Association	Ellis Challenge Cup	Wallsend	Cessnock United	–	2–1
New South Wales British Football Association	Gardiner Challenge Cup	Weston United (1/0)	Balmain Kiaora (0/1)	–	1–0

(Note: figures in parentheses display the club's competition record as winners/runners-up.)

== See also ==
- Soccer in Australia
