= 1906 in Australian soccer =

The 1906 season was the 23rd season of regional competitive soccer in Australia.

== League competitions ==
Federation	Competition	Grand Final			Regular Season		
Federation	Competition	Champions	Score	Runners-up	Premiers	Runners-up	Third place
Northern District British Football Association	Northern NSW Football League	Adamstown Rosebud	2–1	Merewether Advance	Merewether Advance	Adamstown Rosebud	Minmi Rangers
South British Football Soccer Association	Sydney Metropolitan First Division	Pyrmont	–	–	Pyrmont	–	–
Queensland British Football Association	Brisbane Area League	Unknown			Wellingtons	Milton	–
South Australian British Football Association	South Australia Division One	Not played			North Adelaide	Cambridge	Adelaide
Western Australian Soccer Football Association	Western Australia Division One	Not played			Rangers	Fremantle Rovers	Perth FC

== Cup competitions ==
Federation	Competition	Winners	Runners-up	Venue	Result
Northern District British Football Association	Ellis Cup	Adamstown Rosebud (5/6)	Minmi Rangers (8/3)	–	4–2 (agg.)
South British Football Soccer Association	Gardiner Challenge Cup	Glebe (1/2)	Pyrmont District (1/1)	–	3–2

(Note: figures in parentheses display the club's competition record as winners/runners-up.)

== See also ==
- Soccer in Australia
