= 1885 in Australian soccer =

The 1885 season was the second season of regional competitive soccer in Australia and the Australian colonies. The South British Football Soccer Association introduced their NSW football league (now known as the National Premier Leagues NSW) as the first league competition in Australia.

== League competitions ==
Federation	Competition	Winners	Runners-up	Third place
South British Football Soccer Association	Sydney Badge Series	Caledonians	Wanderers	–

== Cup competitions ==
Federation	Competition	Winners	Runners-up	Venue	Result
South British Football Soccer Association	NSW Association Cup	Granville	Caledonian	–	3–1
Anglo-Australian Football Association	George and George Challenge Cup	Richmond	Prahran	–	2–1

== Representative matches ==
New South Wales and Victoria played a match on 16 July 1885 at East Melbourne Cricket Ground. Victoria won the match 4–0 with two goals by H. Dunbar and one goal each from F. Ware and U.F. Robbins.

== See also ==
- Soccer in Australia
