= 1891 in Australian soccer =

The 1891 season was the eighth season of regional competitive soccer in Australia and the Australian colonies. There were two league competitions and two cup competitions fielded by Northern District British Football Association (Northern NSW) and the South British Football Soccer Association (New South Wales).

== League competitions ==
Federation	Competition	Winners	Runners-up	Third place
Northern District British Football Association	Northern NSW Football League	Minmi Rangers	—	—
South British Football Soccer Association	Sydney Badge Series	Parkgrove	—	—

== Cup competitions ==
Federation	Competition	Winners	Runners-up	Venue	Result
Northern District British Football Association	Ellis Cup	Burwood United	–	–	–
South British Football Soccer Association	Gardiner Challenge Cup	Parkgrove (1/1)	Pyrmont Rangers (2/1)	–	4–1

(Note: figures in parentheses display the club's competition record as winners/runners-up.)

== See also ==
- Soccer in Australia
