= 1894 in Australian soccer =

The 1894 season was the eleventh season of regional competitive soccer in Australia and the Australian colonies. There were two league competitions and two cup competitions fielded by Northern District British Football Association (Northern NSW) and the South British Football Soccer Association (New South Wales).

== League competitions ==
Federation	Competition	Grand Final			Regular Season		
Federation	Competition	Champions	Score	Runners-up	Premiers	Runners-up	Third place
Northern District British Football Association	Northern NSW Football League	Adamstown Rosebud	–	–	Adamstown Rosebud	Minmi Thistles	Wallsend Rovers
South British Football Soccer Association	Sydney Metropolitan First Division	Not played			Pyrmont Rangers	Sydney Thistles	Balmain Fernleigh
Queensland British Football Association	Brisbane Area League	Not played			Normans	Dinmore Bush Rats	—

== Cup competitions ==
Federation	Competition	Winners	Runners-up	Venue	Result
Northern District British Football Association	Ellis Cup	Adamstown Rosebud	Minmi Rangers	–	1–1 (3–1p)
South British Football Soccer Association	Gardiner Challenge Cup	Pyrmont Rangers (4/2)	Parkgrove (1/2)	–	7–2

(Note: figures in parentheses display the club's competition record as winners/runners-up.)

== See also ==
- Soccer in Australia
