= 1935 in Australian soccer =

Soccer in Australia
- Season: 1935

The 1935 season was the 52nd season of regional competitive soccer in Australia.

== League competitions ==
| Federation | Competition | Grand Final | | | Regular Season | |
| Federation | Competition | Winners | Score | Runners-up | Winners | Runners-up |
|---|---|---|---|---|---|---|
| Federal Capital Territory Soccer Football Association | FCTSA League | Not played | | | Not played | |
| Australian Soccer Association | NSW State League | Adamstown Rosebud | 4–0 | Metters | Adamstown Rosebud | Metters |
| Queensland British Football Association | Brisbane Area League | Not played | | | Latrobe | Shafston Rovers |
| South Australian British Football Association | South Australia Division One | Not played | | | Port Thistle | West Torrens |
| Tasmanian Soccer Association | Tasmania Division One | Cascades | 8–1 | Thistle | North: Thistle; South: Cascades | North: North Launceston; South: Sandy Bay |
| Anglo-Australian Football Association | Victoria Division One | Not played | | | Melbourne Hakoah | Royal Caledonians |
| Western Australian Soccer Football Association | Western Australia Division One | Not played | | | Victoria Park | Caledonian |

== Cup competitions ==
| Federation | Competition | Winners | Runners-up | Venue | Result |
|---|---|---|---|---|---|
| Australian Soccer Association | NSW State Cup | Metters (1/0) | St George (1/1) | | 5–0 |
| South Australian British Football Association | South Australian Federation Cup | Kingswood (1/0) | Port Thistle (1/1) | | 4–2 |
| Tasmanian Soccer Association | Falkinder Cup | Sandy Bay (7/3) | South Hobart (5/6) | | 5–1 |
| Anglo-Australian Football Association | Dockerty Cup | Melbourne Hakoah (1/1) | Royal Caledonians (1/2) | | 4–3 |

== See also ==
- Soccer in Australia
