= 1901 in Australian soccer =

The 1901 season was the 18th season of regional competitive soccer in Australia.

== League competitions ==
Federation	Competition	Grand Final			Regular Season		
Federation	Competition	Champions	Score	Runners-up	Premiers	Runners-up	Third place
Northern District British Football Association	Northern NSW Football League	Competition abandoned					
South British Football Soccer Association	New South Wales British Football Association	Pyrmont Volunteer	2–2	Pyrmont Rangers	Pyrmont Volunteer	Pyrmont Rangers	Y.M.C.A
Queensland British Football Association	Brisbane Area League	Unknown			Dinmore Bush Rats	Rangers	—
Western Australian Soccer Football Association	Western Australia Division One	Not played			Fremantle Wanderers	Civil Service	Corinthian

== Cup competitions ==
Federation	Competition	Winners	Runners-up	Venue	Result
Northern District British Football Association	Ellis Cup	West Wallsend Bluebells	Adamstown Rosebud	–	3–1
South British Football Soccer Association	Gardiner Challenge Cup	West Wallsend (2/0)	Balgownie Rangers (0/1)	University Oval	4–1

(Note: figures in parentheses display the club's competition record as winners/runners-up.)

== See also ==
- Soccer in Australia
