= 1991–92 in Australian soccer =

Soccer in Australia
- Season: 1991–92

Men's soccer
- NSL Premiership: Melbourne Croatia
- NSL Championship: Adelaide City
- NSL Cup: Adelaide City

The 1991–92 season was the 23rd season of national competitive soccer in Australia and 109th overall.

== National teams ==
=== Men's senior ===
==== Results and fixtures ====
===== Friendlies =====
26 January 1992	Australia	0–0	Sweden	Sydney, Australia
		Report		Stadium: Sydney Football Stadium; Attendance: 13,456; Referee: Gary Power (Australia)

29 January 1992	Australia	1–0	Sweden	Adelaide, Australia
	Edwards 77'	Report		Stadium: Hindmarsh Stadium; Attendance: 9,301; Referee: Tom McRoe (Australia)

2 February 1992	Australia	1–0	Sweden	Melbourne, Australia
	Wade 66'	Report		Stadium: Olympic Park; Attendance: 10,800; Referee: John Fraser (Australia)

13 June 1992	United States	0–1	Australia	Orlando, United States
		Report	Spink 85'	Stadium: Citrus Bowl; Attendance: 17,400; Referee: Ed Cummings (United States)

18 June 1992	Argentina	2–0	Australia	Buenos Aires, Argentina
	Batistuta 47' (pen.), 57'	Report		Stadium: Estadio Monumental; Attendance: 35,000; Referee: Eduardo Dluzniewski (Uruguay)

21 June 1992	Uruguay	2–0	Australia	Montevideo, Uruguay
	Martinez 74'; Larrea 84'	Report		Stadium: Estadio Centenario; Attendance: 18,000; Referee: Juan Carlos Loustau (Argentina)

=== Men's under-17 ===
==== Results and fixtures ====
===== 1991 FIFA U-17 World Championship =====
====== Group B ======
Pos	Team	Pld	W	D	L	GF	GA	GD	Pts	Qualification
1	Australia	3	2	0	1	6	4	+2	4	Advance to knockout stage
2	Qatar	3	1	1	1	1	1	0	3	Advance to knockout stage
3	Congo	3	1	1	1	2	3	−1	3	
4	Mexico	3	1	0	2	5	6	−1	2	

Source: RSSSF

18 August 1991	Australia	4–3	Mexico	Carrara, Italy
21:00	Agostino 5', 28', 29'; Kiratzoglu 17'	Report	Toledano 69', 74'	Attendance: 518; Referee: Lim Kee Chong (Mauritius)

20 August 1991	Congo	0–2	Australia	Carrara, Italy
19:00		Report	Healey 63'; Kiratzoglu 74'	Attendance: 500; Referee: Letchmanasamy Kathirveloo (Malaysia)

22 August 1991	Qatar	1–0	Australia	Carrara, Italy
19:00	Al-Tamimi 76'	Report		Attendance: 400; Referee: Juan Bava (Argentina)

====== Knockout stage ======
25 August 1991 Quarter-finals	Australia	1–2	Argentina	Viareggio, Italy
21:00	Azconzobal 75' (o.g.)	Report	Comelles 29', 55'	Referee: Fabio Baldas (Italy

== Domestic soccer ==
=== National Soccer League ===
Pos	Team	Pld	W	D	L	GF	GA	GD	Pts	Qualification or relegation
1	Melbourne Croatia	26	14	7	5	45	26	+19	35	Qualification for the Finals series
2	Sydney Olympic	26	12	10	4	38	27	+11	34	Qualification for the Finals series
3	South Melbourne	26	13	5	8	51	28	+23	31	Qualification for the Finals series
4	Adelaide City (C)	26	10	9	7	26	23	+3	29	Qualification for the Finals series
5	Wollongong City	26	9	10	7	24	17	+7	28	Qualification for the Finals series
6	Brisbane United	26	8	10	8	31	35	−4	26	
7	Marconi Fairfield	26	10	5	11	33	31	+2	25	
8	APIA Leichhardt (R)	26	7	11	8	26	28	−2	25	Relegation to the NSW Division 1
9	Heidelberg United	26	8	8	10	28	33	−5	24	
10	Parramatta Eagles	26	6	11	9	24	24	0	23	
11	Newcastle Breakers	26	7	8	11	28	39	−11	22	
12	Sydney Croatia	26	6	9	11	22	33	−11	21	
13	West Adelaide	26	7	7	12	25	46	−21	21	
14	Preston Makedonia	26	5	10	11	21	32	−11	20	

Updated to match(es) played on unknown. Source: rsssf.com
Rules for classification: 1) points; 2) goal difference; 3) number of goals scored.
(C) Champions; (R) Relegated

=== NSL Cup ===
==== Final ====
5 April 1992

Adelaide City	2–1	Marconi Fairfield
Mullen 7'; Vidmar 81'	Report	Jones 74'

Hindmarsh Stadium, Adelaide
Attendance: 3,102
Referee: Gordon Dunster
