= 1989–90 in Australian soccer =

Soccer in Australia
- Season: 1989–90

Men's soccer
- NSL Premiership: Marconi Fairfield
- NSL Championship: Sydney Olympic
- NSL Cup: South Melbourne

The 1989–90 season was the 21st season of national competitive soccer in Australia and 107th overall.

== National teams ==
=== Australia women's national soccer team ===
==== Results and fixtures ====
===== Friendlies =====
4 December 1989	Japan	2–2	Australia	Kanagawa, Japan
		Report	Hughes 52'; Vinson 81'

5 December 1989	Japan	1–1	Australia	Kanagawa, Japan
		Report

== Domestic soccer ==
=== National Soccer League ===
Pos	Team	Pld	W	D	L	GF	GA	GD	Pts	Qualification or relegation
1	Marconi Fairfield	26	16	6	4	51	24	+27	38	Qualification for the Finals series
2	South Melbourne	26	15	6	5	42	23	+19	36	Qualification for the Finals series
3	Melbourne Croatia	26	14	7	5	49	26	+23	35	Qualification for the Finals series
4	Adelaide City	26	13	8	5	39	23	+16	34	Qualification for the Finals series
5	Sydney Olympic (C)	26	12	7	7	40	25	+15	31	Qualification for the Finals series
6	APIA Leichhardt	26	11	9	6	36	25	+11	31	
7	Sydney Croatia	26	10	6	10	40	39	+1	26	
8	Parramatta Eagles	26	10	6	10	31	31	0	26	
9	Preston Makedonia	26	9	5	12	33	35	−2	23	
10	St George-Budapest	26	7	7	12	35	44	−9	21	
11	Wollongong City	26	8	4	14	30	48	−18	20	
12	Sunshine George Cross	26	6	5	15	24	49	−25	17	
13	West Adelaide (R)	26	5	4	17	21	54	−33	14	Relegation to the South Australian Division 1
14	Blacktown City (R)	26	4	4	18	30	55	−25	12	Relegation to the NSW Division 1

Updated to match(es) played on unknown. Source: rsssf.com
Rules for classification: 1) points; 2) goal difference; 3) number of goals scored.
(C) Champions; (R) Relegated

=== NSL Cup ===
==== Final ====
25 April 1990
19:00 AEST

South Melbourne	4–1	Sydney Olympic
Taliadoros 21'; Petersen 71'; Trimboli 72' (pen.); Tsolakis 84'	Report	Edwards 27'

Olympic Park, Melbourne
Attendance: 8,790
Referee: John Santa Isabel
