= 1903 in Australian soccer =

The 1903 season was the 20th season of regional competitive soccer in Australia.

== League competitions ==
Federation	Competition	Grand Final			Regular Season		
Federation	Competition	Champions	Score	Runners-up	Premiers	Runners-up	Third place
Northern District British Football Association	Northern NSW Football League	Wallsend Royals	3–1	Adamstown Rosebud	Wallsend Royals	Adamstown Rosebud	Merewether Advance
South British Football Soccer Association	New South Wales British Football Association	Pyrmont	4–2	Glebe	Pyrmont	Balmain	Rozelle
Queensland British Football Association	Brisbane Area League	Dinmore Bush Rats	Unknown		Dinmore Bush Rats	–	—
South Australian British Football Association	South Australia Division One	Not played			North Adelaide	South Adelaide	Woodville
Western Australian Soccer Football Association	Western Australia Division One	Not played			Perth FC	Civil Service	Corinthian

== Cup competitions ==
Federation	Competition	Winners	Runners-up	Venue	Result
Northern District British Football Association	Ellis Cup	Adamstown Rosebud	Merewether Advance	–	Forfeit
South British Football Soccer Association	Gardiner Challenge Cup	Pyrmont District (1/0)	Glebe (0/1)	–	4–2

(Note: figures in parentheses display the club's competition record as winners/runners-up.)

== See also ==
- Soccer in Australia
