= 1998–99 in Australian soccer =

Soccer in Australia
- Season: 1998–99

Men's soccer
- NSL Premiership: Sydney United
- NSL Championship: South Melbourne

Women's soccer
- WNSL Premiership: Canberra Eclipse
- WNSL Championship: Canberra Eclipse

The 1998–99 season was the 30th season of national competitive soccer in Australia and 116th overall.

== National teams ==
=== Australia national soccer team ===
==== Results and fixtures ====
===== Friendlies =====
6 November 1998	United States	0–0	Australia	San Jose, United States
		Report		Stadium: Spartan Stadium; Attendance: 15,074; Referee: Mike Siefert (Canada)

== Men's football ==
=== National Soccer League ===
Pos	Team	Pld	W	D	L	GF	GA	GD	Pts	Qualification
1	Sydney United	28	18	4	6	53	33	+20	58	Qualification for the Finals series
2	South Melbourne (C)	28	17	6	5	50	26	+24	57	Qualification for the Finals series and the Oceania Club Championship
3	Perth Glory	28	16	5	7	62	37	+25	53	Qualification for the Finals series
4	Marconi Fairfield	28	15	3	10	53	47	+6	48	Qualification for the Finals series
5	Northern Spirit	28	14	4	10	36	35	+1	46	Qualification for the Finals series
6	Adelaide City	28	13	6	9	39	26	+13	45	Qualification for the Finals series
7	Sydney Olympic	28	12	7	9	46	36	+10	43	
8	Newcastle Breakers	28	11	7	10	29	33	−4	40	
9	Brisbane Strikers	28	11	6	11	41	47	−6	39	
10	Wollongong Wolves	28	8	8	12	45	52	−7	32	
11	Carlton	28	9	4	15	47	47	0	31	
12	Melbourne Knights	28	8	5	15	32	43	−11	29	
13	West Adelaide	28	7	6	15	36	46	−10	27	
14	Gippsland Falcons	28	5	10	13	17	44	−27	25	
15	Canberra Cosmos	28	4	3	21	21	55	−34	15	

Source: rsssf.com
Rules for classification: 1) points; 2) goal difference; 3) number of goals scored.
(C) Champions

== Women's football ==
=== Women's National Soccer League ===
Pos	Team	Pld	W	D	L	GF	GA	GD	Pts	Qualification or relegation
1	Canberra Eclipse	16	9	3	4	32	25	+7	30	Qualification for the Grand Final
2	SASI Pirates (C)	16	8	4	4	29	11	+18	28	Qualification for the Grand Final
3	NSW Sapphires	16	7	6	3	24	13	+11	27	
4	Queensland Sting	16	5	3	8	26	30	−4	18	
5	Northern NSW Pride	16	2	2	12	14	47	−33	8	

Source: ozfootball.net
Rules for classification: 1) Points; 2) Goal difference; 3) Goals scored
(C) Champions
