= 1916 in Australian soccer =

The 1916 season was the 33rd season of regional competitive soccer in Australia. Most competitions were suspended for the 1916 season.

== League competitions ==
Federation	Competition	Grand Final			Regular Season		
Federation	Competition	Champions	Score	Runners-up	Winners	Runners-up	Third place
Northern District British Football Association	Northern NSW Football League	Weston	Unknown		Unknown		
New South Wales British Football Association	Sydney Metropolitan First Division	Leichhardt-Annandale	Unknown		Leichhardt-Annandale	Pyrmont	Unknown

== Cup competitions ==
Federation	Competition	Winners	Runners-up	Venue	Result
Northern District British Football Association	Ellis Challenge Cup	Weston B	Weston	–	1–0

(Note: figures in parentheses display the club's competition record as winners/runners-up.)

== See also ==
- Soccer in Australia
