= 1907 in Australian soccer =

The 1907 season was the 24th season of regional competitive soccer in Australia.

== League competitions ==
Federation	Competition	Grand Final			Regular Season		
Federation	Competition	Champions	Score	Runners-up	Premiers	Runners-up	Third place
Northern District British Football Association	Northern NSW Football League	Pelaw Main	Unknown				
New South Wales British Football Association	Sydney Metropolitan First Division	Pyrmont	Unknown		Pyrmont	Glebe	Balmain
Queensland British Football Association	Brisbane Area League	Unknown			Dinmore Bush Rats	Unknown	
South Australian British Football Association	South Australia Division One	Not played			Hindmarsh	Cambridge	Adelaide
Western Australian Soccer Football Association	Western Australia Division One	Not played			Perth Rangers	Fremantle Rovers	Perth FC

== Cup competitions ==
Federation	Competition	Winners	Runners-up	Venue	Result
Northern District British Football Association	Ellis Cup	Broadmeadows Royal Arthurs (1/0)	Weston (0/1)	–	Forfeit
New South Wales British Football Association	Gardiner Challenge Cup	Broadmeadow (1/0)	Pyrmont District (1/2)	–	3–2 (R)

(Note: figures in parentheses display the club's competition record as winners/runners-up.)

== See also ==
- Soccer in Australia
