= 2004–05 in Australian soccer =

Soccer in Australia
- Season: 2004

Women's soccer
- WNSL: Queensland Sting

The 2004–05 season was the 36th season of national competitive Soccer in Australia and 122nd overall. After the National Soccer League folded, there was no men's national league competition for the 2004–05 season and was soon to be replaced by the A-League for the 2005–06 season.

== National teams ==
=== Australia national soccer team ===
==== Results ====
===== Friendlies =====
| 21 May 2004 | Australia | 1–3 | Turkey | Sydney, Australia |
| | Bresciano 47' (pen.) | Report | Ozat 42'; Sukur 69', 75' | Stadium: Sydney Football Stadium; Attendance: 28,325; Referee: Toru Kamikawa (Japan) |

| 24 May 2004 | Australia | 0–1 | Turkey | Melbourne, Australia |
| | | Report | Kahveci 44' | Stadium: Telstra Dome; Attendance: 28,953; Referee: Derek Rugg (New Zealand) |

| 29 May 2004 | Australia | 1–0 | New Zealand | Adelaide, Australia |
| | Bresciano 40' | Report | | Stadium: Hindmarsh Stadium; Attendance: 12,130; Referee: Claus Bo Larsen (Denmark) |

| 16 November 2004 | Australia | 2–2 | Norway | London, England |
| | Cahill 44'; Skoko 58' | Report | Iversen 40'; Pedersen 72' | Stadium: Craven Cottage; Attendance: 7,364; Referee: Robert Styles (England) |

===== 2004 OFC Nations Cup / 2006 FIFA World Cup qualification =====
| 31 May 2004 | Australia | 9–0 | Tahiti | Adelaide, Australia |
| | Cahill 14', 47'; Skoko 43'; Simon 44' (o.g.); Sterjovski 51', 61', 74'; Zdrilic 85'; Chipperfield 89' | Report | | Stadium: Hindmarsh Stadium; Attendance: 1,200; Referee: Harry Attison (Vanuatu) |

| 2 June 2004 | Australia | 6–1 | Fiji | Adelaide, Australia |
| | Madaschi 6', 50'; Cahill 39', 66', 75'; Elrich 89' | Report | Gataurua 58' | Stadium: Marden Sports Complex; Attendance: 2,000; Referee: Eduardo Gonzales (Spain) |

| 4 June 2004 | Vanuatu | 0–3 | Australia | Adelaide, Australia |
| | | Report | Aloisi 25', 85'; Emerton 81' | Stadium: Hindmarsh Stadium; Attendance: 2,000; Referee: Charles Ariiotima (Tahiti) |

| 6 June 2004 | Solomon Islands | 2–2 | Australia | Adelaide, Australia |
| | Menapi 43', 75' | Report | Cahill 50', 52' | Stadium: Hindmarsh Stadium; Attendance: 3,500; Referee: Eduardo Gonzales (Spain) |

| 9 October 2004 | Solomon Islands | 1–5 | Australia | Honiara, Solomon Islands |
| | B. Suri 59' | Report | Skoko 5', 28'; Milicic 19'; Emerton 44'; Elrich 79' | Stadium: Lawson Tama Stadium; Attendance: 21,000; Referee: Peter O'Leary (New Zealand) |

| 12 October 2004 | Australia | 6–0 | Solomon Islands | Sydney, Australia |
| | Milicic 5'; Kewell 8'; Vidmar 60'; Thompson 79'; Elrich 82'; Emerton 86' | Report | | Stadium: Sydney Football Stadium; Attendance: 19,208; Referee: Leone Rakaroi (Fiji) |

== Women's football ==
=== Women's National Soccer League ===
| Pos | Team | Pld | W | D | L | GF | GA | GD | Pts | Qualification |
|---|---|---|---|---|---|---|---|---|---|---|
| 1 | Queensland Sting | 10 | 8 | 1 | 1 | 30 | 9 | +21 | 25 | Qualification to Grand Final |
| 2 | Northern NSW Pride | 10 | 8 | 1 | 1 | 24 | 7 | +17 | 25 | Qualification to Grand Final |
| 3 | NSW Sapphires | 10 | 5 | 1 | 4 | 17 | 10 | +7 | 16 | |
| 4 | Canberra Eclipse | 10 | 2 | 1 | 7 | 6 | 22 | −16 | 7 | |
| 5 | Adelaide Sensation | 10 | 1 | 3 | 6 | 6 | 20 | −14 | 6 | |
| 6 | Victoria Vision | 10 | 1 | 3 | 6 | 4 | 19 | −15 | 6 | |

Source: OzFootball.net
Rules for classification: 1) Points; 2) Goal difference; 3) Goals scored
