= 1908 in Australian soccer =

The 1908 season was the 25th season of regional competitive soccer in Australia.

== League competitions ==
Federation	Competition	Grand Final			Regular Season		
Federation	Competition	Champions	Score	Runners-up	Winners	Runners-up	Third place
Northern District British Football Association	Northern NSW Football League	Adamstown Rosebud	Unknown				
New South Wales British Football Association	Sydney Metropolitan First Division	Glebe	Unknown		Glebe	Pyrmont	Unknown
Queensland British Football Association	Brisbane Area League	Unknown			Dinmore Bush Rats	Rangers	Unknown
South Australian British Football Association	South Australia Division One	Not played			Hindmarsh	Port Adelaide	Cambridge
Western Australian Soccer Football Association	Western Australia Division One	Not played			City United	Perth FC	Claremont

== Cup competitions ==
Federation	Competition	Winners	Runners-up	Venue	Result
Northern District British Football Association	Ellis Cup	Adamstown Rosebud (6/6)	Merewether Advance (0/2)	–	Forfeit
New South Wales British Football Association	Gardiner Challenge Cup	Pyrmont District (2/2)	Glebe (1/2)	–	4–0

(Note: figures in parentheses display the club's competition record as winners/runners-up.)

== See also ==
- Soccer in Australia
