= Soccer in Australia =

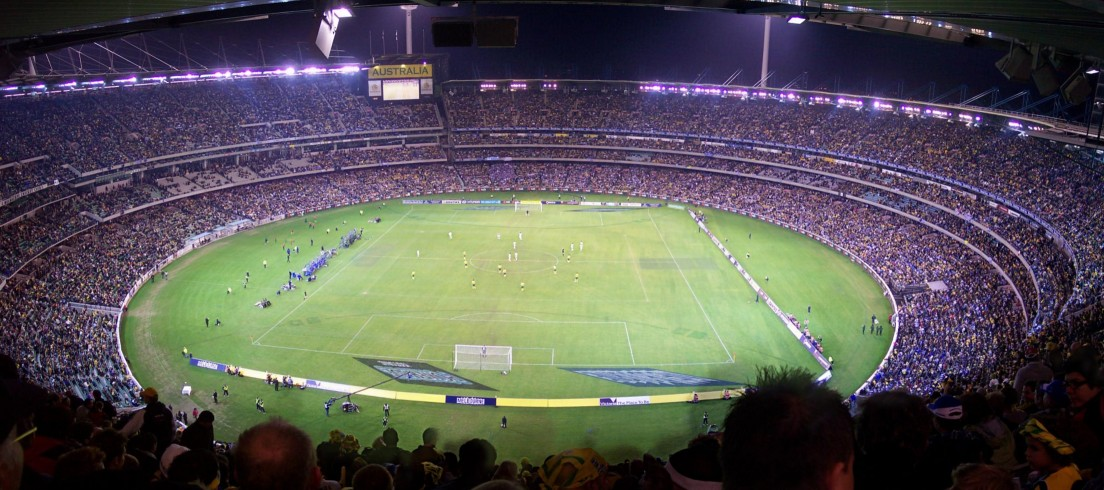
- The Australian national team playing at the Melbourne Cricket Ground, May 2006
- Country: Australia
- Governing body: Football Australia (FA)
- National teams: Australia men's national soccer team Australia women's national soccer team
- Nicknames: Socceroos, Matildas
- First played: 7 August 1875 in Goodna, Queensland.
- Registered players: 1,232,726 (adult); 632,249 (child)
- Clubs: 14,021

National competitions
- A-League Men; A-League Women; Australian Championship; Australia Cup

Club competitions
- A-League Men; A-League Women; Australian Championship; National Premier Leagues Men's; National Premier Leagues Women's; Australia Cup

Audience records
- Single match: 114,000; Spain vs Cameroon; Stadium Australia, 30 September 2000 (National teams); 99,382; Real Madrid vs Manchester City; Melbourne Cricket Ground, 24 July 2015 (Club teams)

Soccer is the most played code of football and outdoor team sport in Australia and ranked in the top ten for television audience as of 2015. Football Australia Limited (FA), a national administrative organisation, is composed of nine state and territory member federations. The local club soccer season in Australia is played in autumn and winter but the Australian Professional Leagues Company Pty Ltd's A-Leagues play in summer, to avoid competing with Australian rules football and Rugby league which dominate spectator and media interest in the country.

Soccer was introduced in Australia in the late 19th century by mostly British immigrants. The first club formed in Australia, Wanderers, was founded on 3 August 1880 in Sydney, while the oldest club in Australia currently in existence is Balgownie Rangers, formed in 1883 in Wollongong. Wanderers were also the first recorded team to play under the Laws of the Game. A semi-professional national league, the National Soccer League (NSL), was introduced in 1977. The NSL was replaced by professional A-League Men, in 2004. The Australian Soccer Federation was a founding member of the Oceania Football Confederation (OFC) before moving to the Asian Football Confederation (AFC) in 2006. The main professional leagues are the A-League Men, A-League Women and the Australia Cup; however, foreign leagues such as the Premier League, the Championship and the Women's Super League are also popular.

The men's and women's national teams, known as the Socceroos and the Matildas respectively, compete globally. Australia cohosted the 2023 FIFA Women's World Cup with New Zealand. The Matildas finished fourth in that tournament (Australia's best ever performance at any World Cup, male or female), and the majority of Australians watched them play on television or at the stadium. It had a major impact on Australian sport, and the phenomenon is commonly known as "Matildas fever".

== History ==
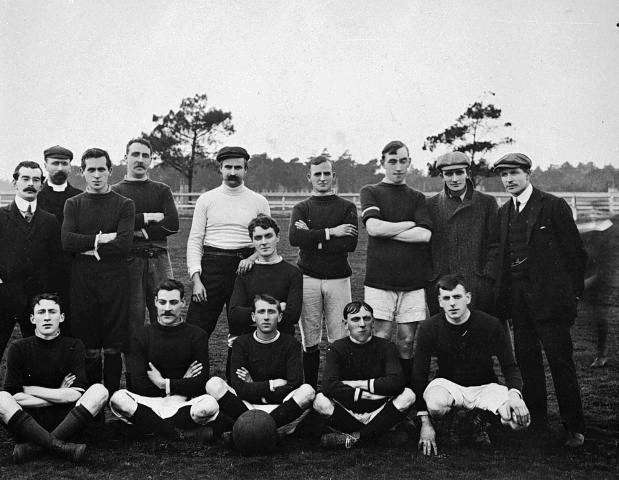
St Kilda Soccer Club at Middle Park, 1909

=== 19th century ===
An early match took place at the Woogaroo Lunatic Asylum, located in Wacol in suburban Brisbane, on 7 August 1875, when a team of inmates and wards men from the asylum played against the visiting Brisbane Australian rules football club; the rules of the match which clearly stated that the "ball should not be handled nor carried" was a direct reference to British Association Rules.

In Hobart on 10 May 1879 the newly formed Cricketers FC, who had adopted the British Association Rules, played a scratch game among its members. On 7 June 1879 the Cricketers club met the New Town FC in a soccer match. Days later both clubs joined the newly formed Tasmanian Football Association which became an Australian rules football body.

The first recorded match in Sydney under the Laws of the Game was contested between Wanderers and members of the Kings School rugby team at Parramatta Common on 14 August 1880. The Wanderers, considered the first soccer club in Australia, was established on 3 August 1880, by English-émigré John Walter Fletcher. Later, in 1882, Fletcher formed the New South Wales English Football Association (also referred to as the South British Football Soccer Association), the first supra-club soccer organisation in Australia and one of the first to be established outside the United Kingdom.

In 1883, Balgownie Rangers, the oldest existing club in Australia was founded; the club currently competes in the Illawarra regional league. Later that year, the first inter-colonial game was played at the East Melbourne Cricket Ground, between a representative Victorian team and one from the neighbouring colony of New South Wales. In 1887 at Moore Park in Sydney a cross-code match utilising soccer rules was played between Wanderers and the high profile Wallaroo rugby club.

As soccer participation continued to grow in Australia, John Fletcher's New South Wales soccer association gave inspiration to other states to establish their own organising bodies for the sport. In 1884, Victoria formed its own association, the Anglo-Australian Football Association (now Football Victoria), as did Queensland, in the Anglo-Queensland Football Association (now, Football Queensland), and Northern New South Wales, in the Northern District British Football Association (now, Northern New South Wales Football). In 1896, the Western Australian Soccer Football Association was formed. In 1900, a Tasmanian association was formed, and later, the South Australian British Football Association was formed in 1902.

=== 20th century ===
Association football (soccer) team of the 'Australian Squadron' of the British Royal Navy. HMS Psyche. 1910

It was not until 1911 that a national-level organisation, the Commonwealth Football Association, was formed. However, this body was superseded by the Australian Soccer Association, which was formed in 1921.

Australia is regarded as the first country where squad numbers in soccer were used for the first time when Sydney Leichardt and HMS Powerful players displayed numbers on their backs, in 1911. One year later, numbering in soccer would be ruled as mandatory in New South Wales.

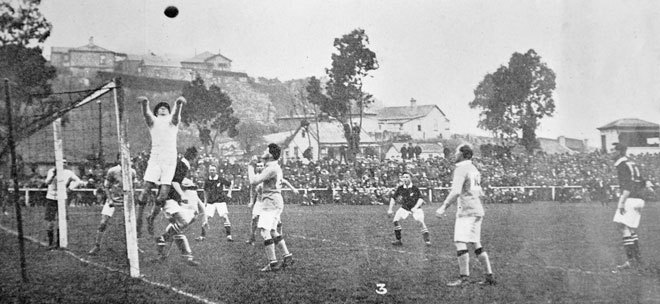
The first Australia national team playing in game 2 against New Zealand during Australia's first ever tour to New Zealand in 1922

On 17 June 1922, the first Australian national representative soccer team was constituted by the Australian Soccer Association to represent Australia for a tour of New Zealand. During the tour the Australia men's national team lost two out of the three matches against the newly formed New Zealand side.

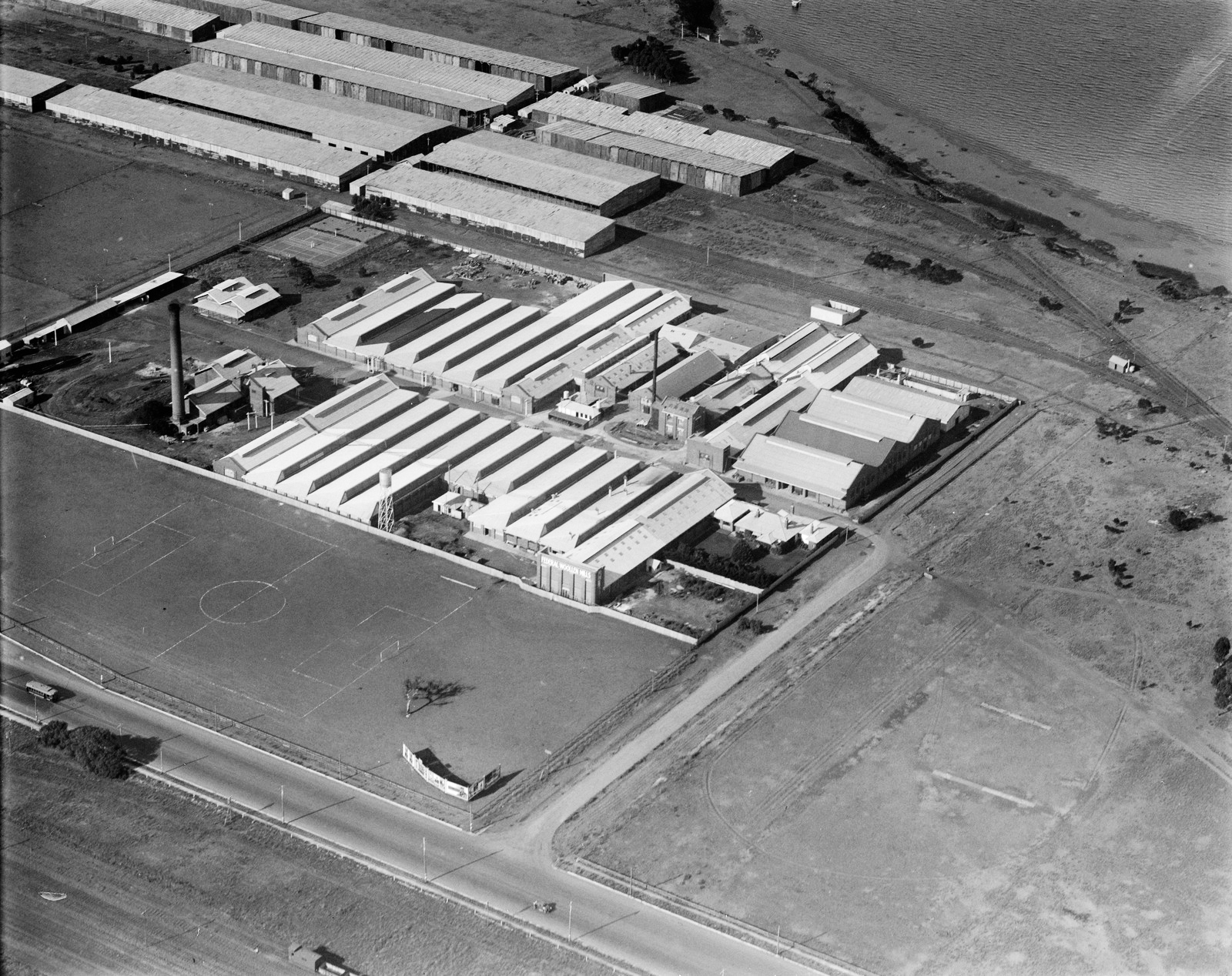
A football pitch used by the Federal Woollen Mills team in North Geelong, Victoria. Photo circa 1925/1935

After World War I, large numbers of British and southern European arrived seeking opportunities in new industries across parts of Australia which led to establishing soccer as a major sport in the country.

RAAF soccer team from No 4 Initial Training School, Victor Harbor, South Australia 1941.

Australian Imperial Force play a Saturday afternoon soccer game in Darwin. Signals versus Navy. 1943

A distinct rise in popularity in New South Wales and Victoria, among other states, was linked to the post-World War II immigration. Migrant players and supporters were prominent, providing the sport with a new but distinct profile. Soccer served as a cultural gateway for many emigrants, acting as a social lubricant. Soccer transcended cultural and language barriers in communities which bridged the gap between minority communities and other classes within the country, thus bringing about a unique unity.

The most prominent soccer clubs in Australian cities during the 1950s and 1960s were based around migrant-ethnic groups, all of which expanded rapidly at that time: Croatian, Greek, Macedonian and Italian communities gave rise to most of the largest clubs, the most notable being South Melbourne (Greek-based), Sydney Olympic (Greek-based), Marconi Stallions (Italian-based), Adelaide City (Italian-based), Melbourne Knights (Croatian-based), Sydney United (Croatian-based) and Preston Lions (Macedonian-based).

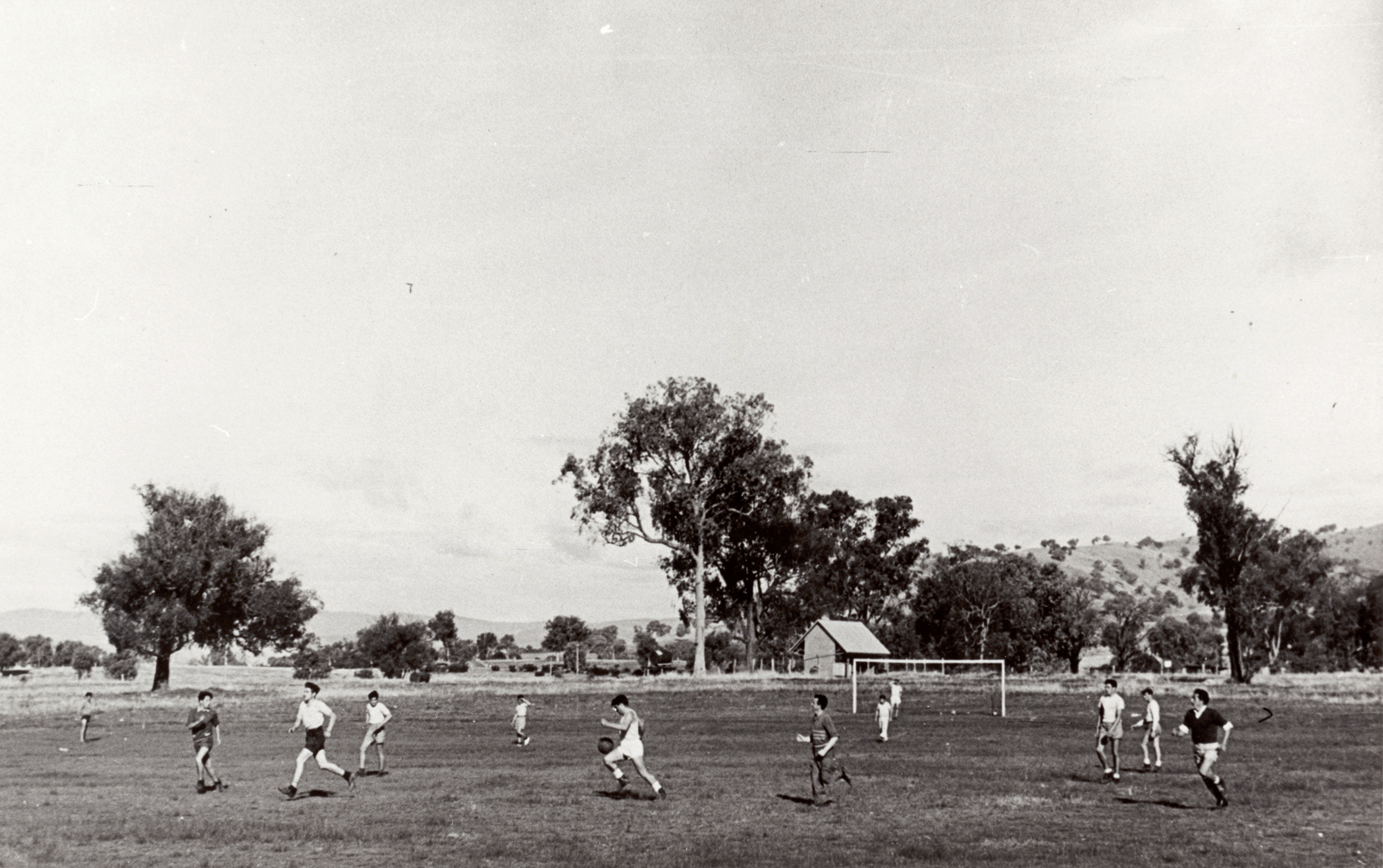
Game of soccer at the Bonegilla Migrant Reception Centre. North East Victoria 1952.

In 1956, Australia became a FIFA member through the Australian Soccer Association, though Australia's membership was soon suspended in 1960 after disobeying FIFA mandate on recruiting foreign players without a transfer fee. In 1961, the Australian Soccer Federation was formed and later admitted to FIFA in 1963, after outstanding fines had been paid. In 1966, Australia became founding members of the Oceania Football Federation (now Oceania Football Confederation).

Pre-1960s, competitive soccer in Australia was state-based. In 1962, the Australia Cup was established, but its ambition of becoming an FA Cup style knockout competition went unfulfilled with its demise in 1968. In 1977, the first national soccer competition, the National Soccer League, was founded.

Migrants continued to boost interest in and player for the sport in the 1970s and 1980s, especially from the Middle East and from the former Yugoslavia.

In 1984, the National Soccer Youth League was founded as a reserve and academy league to run in parallel to the National Soccer League. In 1996, the first national women's soccer competition, the Women's National Soccer League was founded. The National Soccer League and those for women and youth flourished through the 1980s and early 1990s, though with the increasing departure of Australian players to overseas leagues.

Soccer reached notable popularity among Australian people during the second half of the 20th century. Johnny Warren, a prominent advocate for the sport, who was a member of the Australia national team at their first FIFA World Cup appearance in 1974, entitled his memoir Sheilas, Wogs, and Poofters (a reference to the Australian slang: sheila, wog, poofter), giving an indication of how Warren considered the wider Australian community viewed "wogball".

In the mid-1990s, Soccer Australia Limited, under the Chairmanship of David Hill, attempted to shift soccer into the Australian mainstream and away from direct club-level association with migrant roots. Many clubs across the country were required to change their names and badges to represent a more inclusive community.

=== 21st century ===
The sport experienced major change in the country in 2003, after the then Minister for Sport, Rod Kemp, and the Australian Parliament commissioned a report by the Independent Soccer Review Committee. Its findings on the structure, administration and management of soccer in Australia led the restructure of Football Federation Australia (previously Australian Soccer Federation, Soccer Australia, Australia Soccer Association) and later in 2005, the succeeding relaunched national competition, the A-League.

The restructuring of the sport in Australia also saw the adoption of "football" by administrators, in preference to "soccer", to align with the general international name of the sport. Although the use of "football" was largely cultural, as part of an attempt to reposition the sport within Australia, there were also "practical and corporate reasons for the change", including a need for the sport to break away from the baggage left over from previous competitions. However, the move created problems within the wider community, engendering confusion due to the naming conflict with other football codes, and creating conflict with other sporting bodies.

Australia ended a 32-year absent streak when the nation team qualified for the 2006 FIFA World Cup. The team's qualification and success in the tournament helped increase the profile and popularity of the sport in the country.

The national team qualified for second and third consecutive FIFA World Cups in 2010 and 2014; and placed second in the 2011 AFC Asian Cup. The joining of Western Sydney Wanderers to the A-League in 2012 saw a rise in interest for the league within Australia, particularly increasing mainstream interest and re-engagement with disaffected Western Sydney soccer fans. Also, the formation of the National Premier Leagues in 2013 and subsequent restructuring of state leagues as part of the National Competition Review and Elite Player Pathway Review has paved the way for the development of the sport throughout the country. The launch of the Australia Cup (then known as FFA Cup) in 2014 has also similarly increased mainstream interest and grassroots development.

In the 21st century, a major migrant group furnishing new players in the A-League has been the African Australian community, with 34 players making an appearance in the 2020-2021 A-League season, up on 26 the previous year. These include Kusini Yengi and his brother, Tete Yengi, from South Sudan, and their friends, brothers Mohamed and Al Hassan Toure.

In 2020, Football Federation Australia officially unveiled a plan called "XI Principles for the future of Australian Football", shortened as Vision 2035, with the aim to restructure and expand football across the country, with the rebranding of the domestic league, establishment of a national second division, alignment with FIFA Domestic Match Calendar, restart and rebuilding of Australian football products (mainly by fixing the youth football development), reducing costs of football in the country, possibility of establishing promotion and relegation system, and expansion of women's football, with the aim to achieve the Vision 2035 for football in the country.

In summer 2021, Football Australia officials announced a series of major reforms: the shift in calendar by aligning with Domestic Match Calendar and to avoid clashing with FIFA days so it could help the Socceroos to compete; establishment of a second-tier professional league; club licensing framework; domestic transfer system; as well a potential adoption of promotion-relegation system, expected to be implemented by 2022–23.

== Organisation ==
Football Australia Limited (FA) is a national-level organisation affiliated with FIFA which is currently a member of the Asian Football Confederation (AFC) and the regional ASEAN Football Federation (AFF), since leaving the Oceania Football Confederation (OFC) in 2006.

FA has nine state and territory based member federations, although there are two federations a northern and southern federation in New South Wales. These federations organise competitions within their respective region, including the state league and cup tournaments.

Former and current Australian professional soccer players are represented by the Professional Footballers Australia (PFA), a trade union affiliated with the Australian Council of Trade Unions and a member of FIFPro, the global representative organisation for professional soccer players. The association tends to soccer players' pay and conditions, and also protects soccer players from unfair dismissal.

== Competition system ==
=== A-League Men ===
The A-League Men was founded in 2005 and replaced Australia's former National Soccer League. The A-League Men is contested between 12 clubs. The competition is operated by the Australian Professional Leagues.

=== National Premier Leagues ===
The National Premier Leagues Men's has 100 clubs, divided into eight divisions (excluding the Northern Territory). Despite the organisational split, promotion and relegation does not take place between the A-League Men and NPL.

A separate, post-season spring competition for 16 NPL Men's teams, called the Australian Championship, commenced in October 2025.

The National Premier Leagues Women's has 68 clubs, divided into seven divisions (excluding Tasmania and the Northern Territory). No promotion/relegation with the A-League Women occurs.

=== State-league soccer ===
Below the NPL, is what is commonly known as "state-league". This refers to clubs outside of NPL, although they still play in organised competitions for each state in the Australian soccer competition system.

=== District soccer ===
There are many soccer clubs in Australia and district competition associations and leagues. Examples include NSW districts Bankstown, Blacktown, Eastern Suburbs with their own semi-professional competitions with clubs from their respective districts.

== Cup competitions ==
There are several cup competitions for clubs at different levels of the soccer pyramid. The only major cup competitions are the Australia Cup.

- The Australia Cup, first held in 2014, is the only major cup competition in Australia. It is open to around 700 clubs in levels 1–9 of the soccer pyramid.
- The Federation Cup, first held in 1962, is a Capital Football cup played through all levels of Capital Football teams.
- The Waratah Cup, first held in 1991, is a New South Wales cup played through all levels of teams from the NSW league system.
- The Canale Cup, first held in 1894, is the oldest knockout competition in Australia and is played through Brisbane teams below the National Premier Leagues.
- The Dockerty Cup, first held in 1909, is a Victorian cup open to all clubs from Victoria in the Victorian league system.
- The Geelong Community Cup, first held in 1981, is an annual tournament held in the region for local team across all levels of Victorian league system.

There have also been other cup competitions which are no longer run:

- Australia Cup (1962–1968) was for all teams from state leagues.
- NSL Cup (1977–1997) was for all teams that participated in a season of the National Soccer League.
- Challenge Cup (2005–2009) had teams from the A-League.

== Participation ==
According to Ausplay in 2024, there were 1,232,726 adults and 632,249 children playing the sport of which about a quarter were female with an overall participation per capita of 6.9% making it the most participated team sport.

According to FIFA's Big Count in 2006, a total of 970,728 people in Australia participated in the sport, with 435,728 registered players, and 535,000 unregistered players. These numbers were higher than the equivalents for other sports such as cricket, Australian rules football, rugby league and rugby union. In 2013, an audit on the sport by Gemba found that 1.96 million Australians were actively involved in the game as a player. When coaches, referees and fans are included it is estimated that involvement with the sport is around 3.1 million.

Region/State/Territory	Overview	Adult players 2016	Adult players 2022	Adult players 2023/2024
(Australia) National		1,143,640	1,363,642	1,232,726
New South Wales	Overview	440,470	579,445	471,480
(Victoria (state)) Victoria	Overview	262,226	281,017	287,018
Queensland	Overview	232,668	242,917	217,749
Western Australia	Overview	103,636	118,551	117,248
South Australia	Overview	51,601	80,181	84,263
Tasmania	Overview	17,984	17,462	14,594
Australian Capital Territory	Overview	25,210	35,098	28,916
Northern Territory	Overview	8,845	8,971	11,457

== Men's national teams ==
National Men's soccer teams of various age groups represent Australia in international competition. Australian national teams historically competed in the OFC, though since FFA's move in 2006, Australian teams have competed in AFC competitions.

The Australia national soccer team, nicknamed the "Socceroos", represents Australia in international soccer. Australia is a four-time OFC champion, one time Asian champion and AFC National Team of the Year for 2006. The Men's team has represented Australia at the FIFA World Cup tournaments in 1974, 2006, 2010, 2014, 2018 and 2022.

In the Olympic arena, Australia first fielded a men's team at the 1956 Olympics in Melbourne. Australia did not compete again in the Olympic arena, until the 1988 Seoul Olympic Games. Apart from London 2012, where it failed to qualify a team, Australia has competed in all Olympic Men's Football competitions since 1988.

There are also a number of national youth teams: Under-17 team, nicknamed the "Joeys"; Under-20 team, nicknamed the "Young Socceroos"; and the Under-23 team, nicknamed the "Olyroos". The latter is considered to be a feeder team for the national team.

In addition there is a beach team, nicknamed the "Beach Socceroos", which represents Australia in international beach soccer and a Paralympic team, nicknamed the "Pararoos", which competes in international Paralympic association football.

== Women's soccer ==
The participation of Australian women in soccer was first recorded in the early 1920s. It has since become one of the country's most popular women's team sports. As with the men's game, the women's game in Australia saw a large expansion following the post-war immigration, though it is only in recent years that women's soccer has gained momentum, with such factors as the creation of the W-League and the success of the Australia women's national soccer team nicknamed "the Matildas" aiding the increasing popularity of the game. In 2021 the W-League was renamed to A-League Women.

Women's soccer was added to the Olympic program in 1996, with Australia first fielding a Women's team at Sydney 2000. Australia fielded a team at the Athens 2004 Olympics, but did not qualify for the final Olympic tournament again until Rio 2016.

Australia cohosted the 2023 FIFA Women's World Cup with New Zealand. The Matildas finished fourth in that tournament (Australia's best ever performance at any World Cup, male or female), and the majority of Australians watched them play on television or at the stadium. It had a major impact on Australian sport, and the phenomenon is commonly known as "Matildas fever".

In April 2024, the 2023–24 A-League Women season set the record for the most attended season of any women's sport in Australian history, with the season recording a total attendance of 284,551 on 15 April 2024, and finishing with a final total attendance of 312,199.

== Stadiums in Australia ==
The largest rectangular specific stadiums are:

- Brisbane Stadium (Lang Park) (52,500)
- Sydney Football Stadium (42,500)
- Newcastle International Sports Centre (33,000)
- Melbourne Rectangular Stadium (30,000)
- Western Sydney Stadium (30,000)

The Melbourne Cricket Ground is the largest stadium in the country with a capacity of 100,000 that hosts international soccer fixtures and exhibition matches.

== Variations ==
Futsal, an indoor variant of soccer, was introduced in Australia in the early 1970s and soon gained popularity after a wet period during the winter football season forced players indoors where they took up the new sport.

== Media coverage ==
Pay television is the predominant outlet for both domestic and international soccer in Australia. Some games can also be heard on local radio stations. The anti-siphoning list which controls what must be kept on free to air television in Australia includes only specific international matches, including all matches at the FIFA World Cup and FIFA Women's World Cup featuring Australia as well as both the FIFA World Cup Final and the FIFA Women's World Cup Final.

In 2007, a A$120 million, seven-year broadcasting deal between FFA and Fox Sports Australia gave the subscription television exclusive rights to all Australia internationals, all A-League and AFC Asian Cup fixtures, FIFA World Cup qualifiers through the AFC, and all AFC Champions League matches. In 2013, FFA signed a joint A$160 million, four-year deal with Fox Sports and SBS for the A-League. SBS would show a delayed simulcast for the second round of 2018 FIFA World Cup qualification, before the Nine Network broadcast the live simulcast rights for the third round and intercontinental play-offs. In 2017, Fox Sports renewed its deal with FFA for a further six years, with Network 10 simulcasting one A-League match each week. ABC TV would later receive the simulcast rights for the 2019/20 and 2020/21 seasons. In 2020, Fox Sports terminated its contract following financial losses from the COVID-19 pandemic. Paramount+ currently holds the broadcasting rights for the A-Leagues and AFC Champions League competitions until the end of the 2025/26 season, along with all Socceroos and Matildas matches until 2028. Network 10 currently holds simulcast rights for some matches.

Since 1986, SBS has been the official Australian broadcast rights holder for the FIFA World Cup, and the television network will continue to hold the rights to the competition until 2026. The Nine Network broadcast sixteen matches of the 2002 FIFA World Cup, including exclusive coverage of the final, and would also have shown all Australian matches had the Socceroos qualified. Similarly, Optus Sport briefly held exclusive rights to every game of the 2018 FIFA World Cup before relinquishing them to SBS due to technical issues.

Optus Sport is Australia's primary broadcaster of foreign soccer leagues such as the Premier League and the Women's Super League, along with the UEFA European Championship and UEFA European Qualifiers. From 2016 to 2019, SBS held simulcast rights to one Premier League game per round. Stan Sport, which the Nine Network owns, holds the broadcast rights to the UEFA Champions League, Europa League and Conference League competitions.

== Support ==
Soccer is a widely supported sport in Australia, with many Australians following the Socceroos and the Matildas. Many Australians also follow an A-League club and/or other foreign clubs, most commonly English clubs that play in either the Premier League or the Championship.

A study from 2018 found that over 3.8 million Australians or 19% of Australians watched soccer on television and the favoured TV viewing experience was the FIFA World Cup watched by over 3 million Australians.

Many Australians, male and female, play for foreign clubs. The majority of both Socceroos and Matildas players play for clubs outside Australia, mostly for clubs in England. As of the 2024–25 season, fourteen Australians play in the Women's Super League (WSL), with three in the Premier League.

Ange Postecoglou is the first ever Australian to manage a Premier League club, having managed Tottenham Hotspur since 2023. He has heavily contributed to the club's rising popularity in Australia.

=== Most supported clubs ===
==== A-League ====
Roy Morgan Research (2023)
Club	Supporters
Adelaide United	401,000
Brisbane Roar	595,000
Central Coast Mariners	177,000
Macarthur	69,000
Melbourne City	281,000
Melbourne Victory	590,000
Newcastle Jets	207,000
Perth Glory	441,000
Sydney FC	693,000
Wellington Phoenix	59,000
Western Sydney Wanderers	238,000
Western United	66,000

==== Premier League ====
Online survey (Reddit, 2024)
Club	%
Arsenal	17.2%
Chelsea	6.9%
Ipswich Town	5.2%
Liverpool	19.0%
Manchester City	5.2%
Manchester United	6.9%
Tottenham Hotspur	20.7%
Other	18.9%

== Seasons in Australian soccer ==
The following articles are an incomplete list of Seasons in Soccer in Australia since 1884. Each article covers the leagues and competitions played that season, as well as games played by all national teams during that period. National soccer in Australia was not played until the 1962 season as the first 78 seasons only played regional soccer.

1880s					1884	1885	1886	1887	1888	1889
1890s	1890	1891	1892	1893	1894	1895	1896	1897	1898	1899
1900s	1900	1901	1902	1903	1904	1905	1906	1907	1908	1909
1910s	1910	1911	1912	1913	1914	1915	1916	1917	1918	1919
1920s	1920	1921	1922	1923	1924	1925	1926	1927	1928	1929
1930s	1930	1931	1932	1933	1934	1935	1936	1937	1938	1939
1940s	1940	1941	1942	1943	1944	1945	1946	1947	1948	1949
1950s	1950	1951	1952	1953	1954	1955	1956	1957	1958	1959
1960s	1960	1961	1962	1963	1964	1965	1966	1967	1968	1969
1970s	1970	1971	1972	1973	1974	1975	1976	1977	1978	1979
1980s	1980	1981	1982	1983	1984	1985	1986	1987	1988	1989 / 1989–90
1990s	1990–91	1991–92	1992–93	1993–94	1994–95	1995–96	1996–97	1997–98	1998–99	1999–2000
2000s	2000–01	2001–02	2002–03	2003–04	2004–05	2005–06	2006–07	2007–08	2008–09	2009–10
2010s	2010–11	2011–12	2012–13	2013–14	2014–15	2015–16	2016–17	2017–18	2018–19	2019–20
2020s	2020–21	2021–22	2022–23	2023–24	2024–25	2025–26				

=== Seasons in Top Flight ===
53 teams have taken part in 47 National Soccer League and A-League seasons that have been played from the 1977 season until the 2023–24 season. The teams in bold compete in the A-League Men currently.

- **30** seasons: **Brisbane Roar**
- **28** seasons: Marconi Stallions, South Melbourne
- **27** seasons: Adelaide City, **Perth Glory**, Sydney Olympic
- **23** seasons: **Newcastle United Jets**, Wollongong Wolves
- **21** seasons: Melbourne Knights, Sydney United
- **20** seasons: **Adelaide United**
- **19** seasons: **Central Coast Mariners**, **Melbourne Victory**, **Sydney FC**, West Adelaide
- **17** seasons: Heidelberg United, **Wellington Phoenix**
- **14** seasons: APIA Leichhardt, **Melbourne City**, St George FC
- **13** seasons: Brisbane Strikers, Footscray JUST, Preston Lions
- **12** seasons: **Western Sydney Wanderers**
- **11** seasons: Hakoah Sydney City East
- **10** seasons: Brisbane City, Canberra City
- **9** seasons: Morwell Falcons, Newcastle Breakers
- **8** seasons: Sunshine George Cross
- **7** seasons: Blacktown City, Brunswick Juventus, Newcastle KB United, Parramatta FC
- **6** seasons: Canberra Cosmos, Northern Spirit
- **5** seasons: Football Kingz, Parramatta Power, **Western United**
- **4** seasons: Carlton SC, **Macarthur FC**
- **3** seasons: Green Gully, Newcastle Rosebud, Gold Coast United
- **2** seasons: Inter Monaro, Penrith City, Western Suburbs, New Zealand Knights, North Queensland Fury
- **1** seasons: Canterbury Marrickville, Collingwood Warriors, Mooroolbark SC, Wollongong Macedonia

== Attendances ==
=== Historical attendances ===
The average attendance per top-flight football league season and the club with the highest average attendance:

Season	League average	Best club	Best club average
2018–19	10,411	Melbourne Victory	20,604
2017–18	10,671	Melbourne Victory	17,631
2016–17	12,294	Melbourne Victory	22,008
2015–16	12,326	Melbourne Victory	23,112
2014–15	12,511	Melbourne Victory	25,388
2013–14	13,041	Melbourne Victory	21,808
2012–13	12,347	Melbourne Victory	21,885
2011–12	10,497	Melbourne Victory	20,714
2010–11	8,429	Melbourne Victory	18,458
2009–10	9,793	Melbourne Victory	20,750
2008–09	12,180	Melbourne Victory	24,516
2007–08	14,610	Melbourne Victory	26,064
2006–07	12,911	Melbourne Victory	27,728
2005–06	10,956	Melbourne Victory	16,167

Sources: League pages on Wikipedia

== See also ==
=== Overview by state or territory ===
- Soccer in the Australian Capital Territory
- Soccer in New South Wales
- Soccer in Queensland
- Soccer in South Australia
- Soccer in Tasmania
- Soccer in Victoria
- Soccer in Western Australia

=== Other articles ===
- Australian soccer league system
- Soccer records and statistics in Australia
- List of Australian soccer champions
- Football Federation Australia Hall of Fame
- Football Australia defunct sporting federation
