= Wanderers FC (Australia) =

Wanderers
- Full name: Wanderers Football Club
- Nickname: The Wanderers
- Founded: 3 August 1880
Home colours

Wanderers Football Club also known as Wanderers is a former soccer club based in Parramatta, Australia. Founded in 1880, the club is considered to be the first soccer club in Australia.

== History ==
The club was founded on 3 August 1880, by English-emigrate John Walter Fletcher, after he called a meeting at Aarons Hotel, Sydney, to promote the English game of soccer to the New South Wales colony.

Wanderers played their first match on 14 August 1880, against the Kings School rugby team. Wanderers won 5–0 in front of a crowd of 1,000 at Parramatta Common. The match is considered to be the first played under the Laws of the Game in Australia.

In 1887 the Wanderers opened what turned out to be their final season with a cross-code match at Moore Park under soccer rules against Sydney's prominent rugby side Wallaroo FC, winning 6–2.

== Colours and crest ==
Wanderers wore a white jersey, cap, knickerbockers and blue stockings, with a Southern Cross badge over the left breast.

== Grounds ==
The club played games at both Parramatta Common and Moore Park.
