= Hamilton F.C. =

Hamilton F.C. may refer to:

- Hamilton Academical F.C., a Scottish professional association football team
- Hamilton Academical W.F.C., a women's association football team affiliated with the above
- Hamilton F.C. (1874–78), a Scottish former association football club
- Hamilton FC, former name of K–W United FC, a Canadian former association football club
