= George Smith (soccer) =

Australian soccer player (born 1907 or 1908)

Personal information
- Date of birth: 1907 or 1908
- Place of birth: Coledale, Australia
- Height: 1.82 m (6 ft 0 in)
- Position: Forward

Senior career*
Years	Team	Apps	(Gls)
1926–1930	Corrimal	38	(69)
1931	Gladesville-Ryde	6	(5)
1932	Corrimal	17	(41)
1933–1935	St George	55+	(95+)
1936	Granville-Clyde	13	(17)
1937	St George	17	(40)
1938–1939	Metters	26	(26)
1940	Leichhardt-Annandale	13	(16)
1941	Wollongong	10+	(23)
1943	Woonona-Bulli		
Total		193	(328+)

International career
1933–1936	Australia	6	(16)
- * Club domestic league appearances and goals

George Smith was an Australian professional soccer player who played as a forward. He captained the Australia national soccer team in 1933. Often considered the best centre-forward in Australian soccer in the 1930s, he had an average of 2.66 goals per game for Australia and has had many goalscoring records throughout his 17-year career.

== Club career ==
Smith played for a number of clubs in the Sydney and Wollongong areas including Corrimal, where he was the NSW top goalscorer for the 1932 season with 44 goals and St George up to 1936 where he scored 25 goals in 1933 and 51 goals in 1935. He then played for Granville and Leichhardt-Annandale. Throughout his career, Smith scored a total of 651 goals.

=== Granville-Clyde ===
Before the start of the 1936 NSW football, Smith signed for Granville-Clyde.

=== Metters ===
On 17 March 1938, Smith joined Metters. In May 1939, Smith refused to play with Metters after the team was relegated to the reserve grade, he said that if he was not good enough to play in the first-grade he would rather watch the games. He was dropped from Metters to seek a new club to join. He received offers from two clubs Leichhardt-Annandale and Woonona-Bulli to seek his transfer.

=== Wollongong ===
Saturday 21 June 1941, Smith made his transfer to Wollongong for £20 and on the same day he played against his former team St George. He announced his arrival in some style as he scored 6 goals to beat St George 10–0.

== International career ==
Smith began his international career with Australia as captain in an international friendly, debuting in a 4–2 win over New Zealand scoring two goals. He became the first player to score a hat-trick for Australia in a 6–4 win against New Zealand. He scored seven goals in the three-match test series all against New Zealand in 1933. Smith was part of New South Wales' team, where he started and scored against his captained international team Australia. He returned to Australia's team with the captaincy given to Alec Cameron. He continued his outstanding goalscoring record by scoring four goals when Australia won 7–1 in July 1936 at Logan Park, Dunedin. A week later, Smith made another record by scoring five goals as he broke the record for most goals in an international match for Australia. For the first time in his national career, Smith failed to score when Australia won 4–1 over New Zealand. A year later, Smith retired from international football. Smith held the record as top goalscorer for Australia for 37 years, until the record was overtaken by Attila Abonyi in March 1973. On 3 May 1937, Smith announced his retirement from international football.

== Personal life ==
George Smith married Miss Dorris Ruddock.

== Career statistics ==
=== Club ===
Appearances and goals by club, season, and competition. Only official games are included in this table.
Club	Season	League		State Premiership		State League Cup		Other		Total	
Club	Season	Apps	Goals	Apps	Goals	Apps	Goals	Apps	Goals	Apps	Goals
Corrimal	1926	15+	29+	0	0	0	0	3+	2+	18+	31+
Corrimal	1927	13+	21+	0	0	0	0	2+	4+	14+	25+
Corrimal	1928	7+	12+	0	0	0	0	3+	3+	10+	15+
Corrimal	1929	2+	5+	0	0	0	0	2+	1+	4+	6+
Corrimal	1930	1+	2+	0	0	0	0	1+	0+	2+	2+
Gladesville	1931	6+	5+	0	0	0	0	0	0	6+	5+
Corrimal	1932	19	43	0	0	2	4	1	3	22	50
St George	1933	11	22	0	0	6	6	0	0	17	28
St George	1934	21+	29+	0	0	1	1	1	1	23+	31+
St George	1935	18+	41	0	0	6	6	0	0	24+	47
Granville	1936	13+	19	0	0	0	0	0	0	13+	19
St George	1937	17	40	0	0	2	2	0	0	19	42
Metters	1938	22	23	0	0	4	7	1	0	27	30
Metters	1939	5	3	0	0	0	0	0	0	5	3
Leichhardt	1939	6	15	0	0	0	0	0	0	6	15
Leichhardt	1940	13	16	0	0	1	1	0	0	14	17
Metters	1941	20	23	0	0	0	0	0	0	20	23
Wollongong	1942	4	5	0	0	0	0	0	0	4	5
Wollongong	Total	213+	353+	0	0	22	27	14+	14+	248+	391+

=== International ===
National team	Year	Competitive		Friendly		Total	
National team	Year	Apps	Goals	Apps	Goals	Apps	Goals
Australia	1933	0	0	3	7	3	7
Australia	1936	0	0	3	9	3	9
Career total		0	0	6	16	6	16

Scores and results list Australia's goal tally first, score column indicates score after each Australia goal.

List of international goals scored by George Smith
No.	Date	Venue	Opponent	Score	Result	Competition	Ref.
1	5 June 1933	Brisbane Exhibition Ground, Brisbane, Australia	New Zealand	–	4–2	Friendly	
2	5 June 1933	Brisbane Exhibition Ground, Brisbane, Australia	New Zealand	–	4–2	Friendly	
3	17 June 1933	Sydney Cricket Ground, Sydney, Australia	New Zealand	1–0	6–4	Friendly	
4	17 June 1933	Sydney Cricket Ground, Sydney, Australia	New Zealand	2–0	6–4	Friendly	
5	17 June 1933	Sydney Cricket Ground, Sydney, Australia	New Zealand	5–0	6–4	Friendly	
6	24 June 1933	Sydney Cricket Ground, Sydney, Australia	New Zealand	3–2	4–2	Friendly	
7	24 June 1933	Sydney Cricket Ground, Sydney, Australia	New Zealand	4–2	4–2	Friendly	
8	4 July 1936	Logan Park, Dunedin, New Zealand	New Zealand	3–1	7–1	Friendly	
9	4 July 1936	Logan Park, Dunedin, New Zealand	New Zealand	4–1	7–1	Friendly	
10	4 July 1936	Logan Park, Dunedin, New Zealand	New Zealand	6–1	7–1	Friendly	
11	4 July 1936	Logan Park, Dunedin, New Zealand	New Zealand	7–1	7–1	Friendly	
12	11 July 1936	Basin Reserve, Wellington, New Zealand	New Zealand	–	10–0	Friendly	
13	11 July 1936	Basin Reserve, Wellington, New Zealand	New Zealand	–	10–0	Friendly	
14	11 July 1936	Basin Reserve, Wellington, New Zealand	New Zealand	7–0	10–0	Friendly	
15	11 July 1936	Basin Reserve, Wellington, New Zealand	New Zealand	8–0	10–0	Friendly	
16	11 July 1936	Basin Reserve, Wellington, New Zealand	New Zealand	9–0	10–0	Friendly	
