= 1879 TFA season =

1st season of the Tasmanian Football Association

- Teams: 3
- Premiers: City

The 1879 TFA season was the inaugural season of the Tasmanian Football Association (TFA), an Australian rules football competition in southern Tasmania.

In 1879, a "rules war" emerged in Hobart, with rugby, soccer and local football codes played by clubs. On 12 June 1879, the TFA was officially formed (giving it some claim to the title of the third-oldest club football league in the world), with the decision to play "Victorian rules" passed by 1 vote at a meeting. Two soccer clubs (City and Cricketers) and three local code clubs (New Town, Railway and Richmond) were part of the meeting.

Three clubs of those five clubs − City, Cricketers and Railway − competed in the inaugural season. City was awarded the TFA premiership at the end of the season, without a grand final being played.

Former (and future) Tasmanian premier William Giblin served as the first chairman of the TFA, while L. Y. Prior served as secretary.
