= 1928 Federal Capital Territory Soccer Football Association season =

The 1928 Capital Football season was the third Capital Football season. There was only one ACT competition played which was the FCTSA League and was won by Queanbeyan by a 2-point margin.

== 1928 FCTSA League ==
FCTSA League
- Season: 1928
- Dates: 12 May 1928 – 21 July 1928
- Matches played: 30
- Goals scored: 87 (2.9 per match)
- Biggest away win: Queanbeyan 7–1 Ainslie (16 June 1928)

The 1928 FCTSA League was the third season of the FCTSA League, the former top soccer league in the Capital Football.

=== Teams ===
- Ainslie
- Burns
- Kingston
- Queanbeyan

=== League table ===
Pos	Team	Pld	W	D	L	GF	GA	GD	Pts
1	Queanbeyan (C)	8	6	2	0	35	2	+33	14
2	Burns	8	5	2	1	29	15	+14	12
3	Kingston	7	1	0	6	11	33	−22	2
4	Ainslie	7	1	0	6	12	37	−25	2

Source: Socceraust.co
Rules for classification: 1) Points; 2) Goal difference; 3) Goals scored
(C) Champions

=== Results ===
Home \ Away	AIN	BUR	KIN	QUE	AIN	BUR	KIN	QUE
Ainslie	—	2–6	2–7	0–8	—	0–3	—	—
Burns	6–0	—	7–2	1–1	—	—	—	0–8
Kingston	0–7	2–6	—	0–4	—	—	—	—
Queanbeyan	7–1	0–0	4–0	—	—	—	3–0	—

Updated to match(es) played on 21 July 1928. Source: Socceraust.co
Legend: Blue = home team win; Yellow = draw; Red = away team win.
