= Tommy McColl =

Soccer player (born 1945)

Thomas Gunn McColl (born 19 September 1945) is a former association football player who played as a forward. Born in Scotland, he represented Australia national team at international level.

== Club career ==
Born in Glasgow, Scotland, McColl played his youth football for Dennistoun Juniors in Scotland.

Between 1963 and 1964 he played 11 matches for Colchester United in England. He was sold to Chelsea for £7,500 in September 1964, though he made no senior appearances.

He later moved to Australia where he played for Adelaide Juventus and Melbourne Juventus.

In late 1970 terms were agreed to the transfer of McColl from Melbourne Juventus to Auburn in Sydney for $6,000. In January 1971 when he had not arrived in Sydney, Auburn officials were told he was on his way to Sydney. It was later found that he was in Rhodesia where he had requested a transfer to Chibuku FC.

After playing several seasons in Rhodesia, McColl in 1975 appealed to FIFA to secure a release from Chibuku.

In 1977 McColl signed for Frankston City in Melbourne.

== International career ==
McColl made his debut for Australia in November 1967 against New Zealand in Saigon. He played his final match in December 1969 against Israel in Tel Aviv having played 19 times for Australia and scoring eight goals.

== Honours ==
Australia

- South Vietnam Independence Cup: 1967
