= Elphin FC =

Australian association football club

Elphin
- Full name: Elphin Soccer Club
- Founded: 1910
- Dissolved: c.1930s
- Ground: N/A
- Capacity: N/A
- Chairman: N/A
- Manager: N/A
- League: N/A
- N/A: N/A

Elphin Soccer Club was an association football club based in Elphin, a suburb of Launceston, Tasmania. Elphin, along with Launceston United SC and Tamar FC, inaugurated the two-round league competition in what was then called the Northern Soccer Association in 1912. They played in the Northern Premier league in the years before the Second World War.

Despite winning 6 northern titles within a period of 14 years, Elphin disappeared by the early 1930s.

== Honours ==
- State Championship Runners-up: 5 times (1920,1923,1924,1927,1928)
- Northern Premierships: 6 times (1914,1920,1923,1924,1927,1928)
