= Alec Cameron (soccer) =

Australian football player

Personal information
- Full name: Alec Cameron
- Place of birth: England
- Position: Forward

Senior career*
Years	Team	Apps	(Gls)
1922–1937	Adamstown		
1937–1940	Weston		

International career
1933–1936	Australia	6	(6)
- * Club domestic league appearances and goals

Alec Cameron was an Australian professional soccer player who played as a forward and captained the Australia national soccer team.

== Club career ==
Cameron had played his entire senior career with Adamstown. He scored 23 goals during the 1930 league season, won the Northern NSW state league and the Double Cup. He scored the first goal in Adamstown's 2–0 win over Cessnock in 1930. He won further Premierships in 1934 and 1935.

After Cameron playing with Adamstown for 15 years he joined Weston on a three-year deal on 3 March 1937.

== International career ==
Cameron began his international career with Australia in an international friendly, debuting in a 4–2 win over New Zealand on 5 June 1933. He scored his first international goal two weeks later against New Zealand in a 6–4 win. He continued his international career with Australia in 1936 and was captain for three more international matches against New Zealand, and scored five more goals in the three-match series in 1936.

Around the time where Cameron signed for Weston he played in Australia's historic tour against an English FA touring side in 1937.

== Career statistics ==
=== International ===
National team	Year	Competitive		Friendly		Total	
National team	Year	Apps	Goals	Apps	Goals	Apps	Goals
Australia	1933	0	0	3	1	3	1
Australia	1936	0	0	3	5	3	5
Career total		0	0	6	6	6	6

Scores and results list Australia's goal tally first, score column indicates score after each Australia goal.

List of international goals scored by Alec Cameron
No.	Date	Venue	Opponent	Score	Result	Competition	Ref.
1	17 June 1933	Sydney Cricket Ground, Sydney, Australia	New Zealand	4–0	6–4	Friendly	
2	4 July 1936	Logan Park, Dunedin, New Zealand	New Zealand	2–1	7–1	Friendly	
3	11 July 1936	Basin Reserve, Wellington, New Zealand	New Zealand	–	10–0	Friendly	
4	11 July 1936	Basin Reserve, Wellington, New Zealand	New Zealand	6–0	10–0	Friendly	
5	18 July 1936	Blandford Park, Auckland, New Zealand	New Zealand	–	4–1	Friendly	
6	18 July 1936	Blandford Park, Auckland, New Zealand	New Zealand	–	4–1	Friendly	
