= Tamar FC =

Tamar
- Full name: Tamar; Soccer Club
- Founded: 1910-1939
- Ground: N/A
- Capacity: N/A
- Chairman: N/A
- Manager: N/A
- League: Defunct
- 2006: N/A

Tamar Football Club was an association football club which represented Launceston in the Northern Premier league in the years before World War II. Tamar won the inaugural northern league in 1912, and went on to gather a further 6 prior to the war. Like many clubs that existed before the war, they failed to resume after the war ended. Like their northern pre-war rivals, Invermay, they failed to convert their northern dominance into state championships.

== Honours ==
- State Championship Runners-up: 5 times (1921,1931,1932,1933,1934)
- Northern Premierships: 7 times (1912,1913,1921,1931,1932,1933,1934)
