= Cessnock City Hornets FC =

Cessnock Hornets
- Full name: Cessnock City Hornets Football Club Inc
- Nickname: Hornets
- Founded: 1907
- Ground: Turner Park, Aberdare Road, Aberdare
- Capacity: 800
- Coordinates: 32°50′32.68″S 151°21′50.88″E
- League: NNSW State League 1
- 2025: 9th of 10
- Website: http://www.cessnockhornetsfc.com.au/
Home colours	Away colours

Cessnock City Hornets FC is a semi-professional soccer club based in Cessnock, New South Wales. The Hornets currently compete in the Northern NSW State League Division 1 with teams in First Grade, Reserve Grade, Under 18, Under 16, Under 15, Under 14 and Under 13 divisions. Northern NSW State League Division 1 is the 2nd tier of Football in Northern New South Wales Football below the National Premier Leagues Northern NSW.

== History ==
Over the years, doubt has been expressed about the birth of soccer in Cessnock.

To get down to the basic truths, Sid Grant, a well known historian, undertook a detailed research including personal interviews with old Bob Harden (ex-West Wallsend skipper), Tom Rennex, ‘G ‘Tup’’ Rennex, Alf Brunskill, Alec Renfrew and others. But the truth of this problem came out when a former Secretary of the NDBFA, Mr George Reay of Dudley, presented Sid with both the official minute book and registrar of players book for the period 1902–1911.

This indicated clearly that soccer started in Cessnock in April 1907. A group of 15 sportsmen met on a vacant allotment just south of the Cessnock railway station. Many of these enthusiasts were recent arrivals from Minmi, West Wallsend, Greta and Stockton. The first ground was a large vacant area near where the Aberdare Park was established 15 years later. 2007 saw Cessnock celebrate 100 years of football.

== Home ground ==
Cessnock play their home games at the Hornets Ground, Turner Park Complex, Aberdare Road, Aberdare.

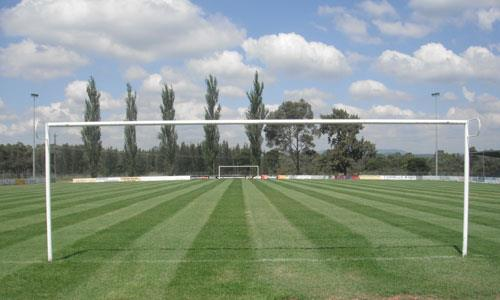

== Rivalries ==
Cessnock City Hornets' biggest rival is Weston Workers Bears FC. The Hornets also have a big local rivalry with Singleton Strikers.

== Honours ==
- NNSW Division Two/HIT Northern League One Premiers:

1977, 1988, 1992

- NNSW Division Two/HIT Northern League One Champions:

1986, 1987, 1988, 1993

== Notable former players ==
Cessnock has had many players go on to represent Australia at a junior and senior level, including:

- Cliff Almond
- John Barr
- Les Brown
- Jack Drinkwater
- Jack Evans
- Jim Harden
- Lo Hearne
- Eddie Hodge
- Jack Lennard
- Perce Lennard
- William Lonergan
- Roy McNaughton
- Amber Neilson
- Kevin O'Neill
- Jim Orr
- Greg Owens
- Phil Peters
- John Pettigrew
- Alec Purdon
- John Roberts
- George Rowe
- George Russell
- Oliver Shaw
- Lorisssa Stevens
- Jack Taylor
- Cec Williams
- Ern Williams
- Clayton Zane
- Ethan Carmody
- Dominic White
- Matthew Grant
- Kevin Van Gool
