= Sandy Bay SC =

Sandy Bay
- Full name: Sandy Bay Soccer Club
- Founded: 1922–1953
- Ground: Queensborough, Sandy Bay
- Capacity: 400
- League: Defunct as of 1953
- 2006: N/A
Home colours

Sandy Bay Soccer Club was a football (soccer) club which represented Sandy Bay in the Tasmanian Southern Premier League from 1922 until its demise in 1953. In their 31-year history Sandy Bay established itself as a powerhouse club of Tasmanian football, winning a remarkable seven state championships, and seven southern premierships which still sees them placed fourth on the winners lists of both competitions despite folding over 50 years ago.

Their great rivalry with neighbours South Hobart was a feature of Tasmanian football competitions before World War II, and their demise was regretted by all associated with the club.

== Honours ==
- State Championship: (7 times) 1924,1925,1927,1933,1936,1938,1939
- Southern Premierships: (7 times) 1924,1925,1927,1933,1936,1938,1939
- Southern Premier Runners-up: (5 times) 1923,1931,1932,1934,1937
- Falkinder Cup Winners: (10 times) 1923,1925,1926,1927,1931,1933,1935,1936,1937,1939
- Falkinder Cup Runners-up: (4 times) 1929,1930,1934,1946
