= Minmi Rangers =

- Full name: Minmi Rangers
- Founded: 1886
- League: Zone League One
- Website: http://websites.sportstg.com/club_info.cgi?c=0-8218-110094-0-0

Minmi Rangers was Australian football club that was one of the foundation members of the Northern District British Football Association. It was the most successful club in the competition in the 1880s and 1890s.

== History ==
The story goes that Minmi Rangers FC was formed on 9 September 1884. However there is no primary source reference to this from the period. Minmi Rangers entered the historical record in 1886. Members of the inaugural team were expatriate Scottish coal miners who had settled in Minmi. In 1886 the Rangers had won the first Newcastle & District premiership. They proceeded to win the premierships of 1887, 1888, 1889, 1891, 1892 and 1893. During the same period, they won the knockout Ellis Cup competition in 1886, 1887, 1888, 1890, 1892, 1893, 1895 and 1898.

Recent research by Dr. Jeffrey Green has cast doubt on the year Minmi Rangers was formed. Dr. Green contends that Minmi was probably formed in late 1885 or early 1886 as a result of players from Lambton Thistle moving for work to Minmi. Lambton Thistle was formed in 1885 and played Caledonians from Sydney at Lambton Reserve on 13 June 1885 in the first recorded organised game of football in Northern NSW. Lambton Thistle only played in 1885 and 6 of its players played for Minmi in 1886.

A record of the 1886 Annual General meeting of the British Association in the Globe (Sydney) newspaper gives further evidence on the date of the formation of clubs. The first clubs in NSW in 1885 were, in order of formation, Caledonians, Canterbury, Friendly Society (Parramatta), Granville, Thistle (Lambton), Pyrmont Rangers, Katoomba College, Wanderers and Arcadians. The meeting was informed of the interest from new clubs Hamilton Rangers and Minmi Rangers to join the association. (The Globe(Sydney) 16 April 1886 page 8)

Minmi's biggest triumph came in 1892, when it claimed the Gardiner Cup. The Gardiner Cup was, from 1885 to 1928, the biggest prize in New South Wales football. Minmi 3-0 triumphed in the final against Sydney namesakes, Pyrmont Rangers.

The fortunes of Minmi Rangers FC had dwindled by the turn of the century. No further success would come after 1898. A downturn in the local coal industry saw players depart Minmi, and by 1911 the club had lost its senior competition status.

On a footnote, the last surviving member of the Minmi Rangers "of the 1895 to 1900 period" was Jim Curran, who was "regarded as the greatest scoring winger of all time". His death at the age of 94 in West Wallsend was reported in the Sydney Morning Herald of 8 May 1962 under the headline "Soccer Star Dies, Aged 94". He was also known to be one of the Ellis Cup winners of 1886.

Other Minmi Clubs:

- Minmi Thistles 1894
- Minmi Trilbys and Minmi Advance 1900
- Minmi Rooks 1905
- Minmi Starlights and Minmi Squashers 1905
- Minmi Wanderers, 1907. Some newspaper references describe them playing in green.

Minmi has made a little resurgence in recent years, with Minmi FC, making their way up to Zone League One in 2021, the 4th tier in Northern NSW Football and 5th nationally.

== See also ==
- Soccer in Australia
- Northern NSW Football
