= West Wallsend FC =

West Wallsend
- Full name: West Wallsend Football Club
- Nickname: Bluebells
- Founded: 1891
- Ground: Johnston Park
- Coordinates: 32°54′2.1″S 151°34′42.6″E
- President: Jason Taylor; Keith Couper
- Secretary: Megan Crowhurst
- Head Coach: Bailey Cox
- League: NNSW State League 1
- 2025: 3rd out of 10
- Website: http://websites.sportstg.com/team_info.cgi?id=26408000&c=0-8304-0-518983-0
Home colours	Away colours

West Wallsend FC is an association football club based in West Wallsend, New South Wales, Australia. The club is a member of Northern NSW Football in Australia. The club was formed in 1891 by Scottish miners and is the third oldest surviving football club in the Northern Federation, behind Wallsend Red Devils FC (1887) and Adamstown Rosebud FC (1889).

== History ==
Founded by Scottish miners in 1891 as West Wallsend Athletic FC, they did not compete during the 1895 and 1896 season due to a miners' strike in the district. The club re-formed at the end of 1896 as the West Wallsend Bluebells FC.

Highlights include the club being selected in 1902 to represent Newcastle against Sydney and winning 4–2. In 1923, the Bluebells played the touring Canadian side and won 3–0.

Over the years, the club has picked up many honours and has produced 21 internationals.

One of the club's darkest hours came at the end of the 1996 season, when the Federation dumped the club from the top division due to lack of facilities, despite featuring in six grand finals in the previous fourteen years.

The club struggled to regain its place in the Northern League. Its only brief appearance in 2001 saw the club finish last for only the third time in its history and be relegated again.

In 2007, the club won the NEW-FM League minor premiership and was promoted back to the Northern NBN State League, where it finished a credible eighth in the 2008 season and was selected in the new eight team NBN State League for 2009–10.

After a five-year stint in the NBN State League, the club was relegated back to the NEW-FM First Division at the end of the 2012 season after finishing last.

After relegation in 2012, the side was nearly disbanded in 2014 when they struggled to sign enough players to form a side. The club has gradually returned to be one of the stronger sides in the First Division Competition in recent years, highlighted by their Grand Final Appearance in 2018.

== Ground ==
The home ground is located at Johnston Park, on the corner of Laidley Street and Wilson Street in West Wallsend. Named after William Johnson (Johnston) owner of the Johnston Hotel (established 1887, and now the Museum Hotel) who leased land from the Caledonian Coal company for a soccer field it was eventually named after him. During the 1920s, the ground picked up the nickname 'Wembley' as the side contained eight internationals.

== Rivals ==
The Bluebells' biggest rival is the Wallsend Football Club. Both clubs have enjoyed success at the state level. However, both have encountered lean times in more recent years. Edgeworth Eagles are their nearest rivals, however since the Bluebells were relegated back to the First Division at the end of 2012, encounters between the side have been restricted to the Heritage Cup and FFA Cup competitions. Adamstown Rosebud FC and Weston Workers Bears are two other clubs who have built up a rivalry with West Wallsend in over 100 years of encounters.

== Honors ==
- Northern NSW Premiership (13) 1899, 1902, 1904, 1913, 1919, 1920, 1921, 1922, 1928, 1925, 1926, 1946, 1986
- Northern NSW Grand Finals (7) 1919, 1921, 1922, 1924, 1985, 1988, 1992
- Northern Second Division Premierships (3) 1999, 2000, 2007
- Northern Second Division Grand Finals (4) 2000, 2003, 2007, 2023
- Gardiner Cup (6) 1900, 1901, 1921, 1923, 1924, 1926
- Kerr Cup (6) 1918, 1919, 1920, 1922, 1924, 1928
- State Cup (2) 1931, 1945
- Northern Cup (1) 1931
- Ellis Cup (8) 1899, 1900, 1901,1902, 1919, 1921, 1925, 1926
- Denton Cup (3) 1897, 1898, 1899
- Stevenson Cup (2) 1925, 1926
- Daniels Cup (1) 1957

== Internationals ==
- Dave Brown
- Les Brown
- Jack Coutts
- Clarrie Coutts
- Frank Coolahan
- Bill Coolahan
- Jack Foster
- Keith Grant
- Troy Halpin
- Frank Hays
- Jock Hodge
- Charlie James
- Kevin Lake
- Henry Maunder
- William Maunder
- Di McLaughlin
- Harry Muir
- Richard Sneddon
- Wal Smith
- Harold Whitelaw
- Dave Bone
