= 1983 NSL Cup final =

- Event: 1983 NSL Cup
Sydney Olympic	Heidelberg United
2	0
- on aggregate

First leg
Sydney Olympic	Heidelberg United
1	0
- Date: 6 November 1983
- Venue: St George Stadium, Sydney
- Referee: Tony Boskovic
- Attendance: 6,420

Second leg
Heidelberg United	Sydney Olympic
0	1
- Date: 13 November 1983
- Venue: Olympic Park, Melbourne
- Referee: Chris Bambridge
- Attendance: 6,000

The 1983 NSL Cup final were the final matches of the 1983 NSL Cup, the seventh season of the National Soccer League Cup. It was contested between Sydney Olympic and Heidelberg United. The first leg was played at St George Stadium in Sydney on 6 November 1983. The second leg was played at Olympic Park in Melbourne on 13 November 1983. Sydney Olympic won 2–0 on aggregate for their first NSL Cup title.

== Route to the final ==
Sydney Olympic		Round	Heidelberg United	
Opposition	Score	Round	Opposition	Score
St George-Budapest (A)	3–0	1st	Footscray JUST (A)	3–2
Newcastle KB United (H)	3–1	QF	West Adelaide (A)	4–0
South Melbourne (H)	3–2	SF	Marconi Fairfield (H)	2–1
Key: (H) = Home venue; (A) = Away venue

== Match ==
=== Details ===
==== First leg ====
6 November 1983

Sydney Olympic	1–0	Heidelberg United
Patalis 64'	Report

St George Stadium, Sydney
Attendance: 6,420
Referee: Tony Boskovic

GK	(Australia) Gary Meier
DF	(New Zealand) Ricki Herbert
DF	(England) Mick Coady
DF	(Australia) Graham Jennings
MF	(Australia) Tony Spyridakos
MF	(Australia) Jim Patikas
MF	(Australia) Gary Phillips
MF	(Australia) Peter Katholos
MF	(Australia) Chris Kalantzis
FW	(Australia) Terry Patalis
FW	(Australia) Marshall Soper	Yellow card	(substituted off) 82'
Substitutes:
MF	(England) Martyn Rogers		(substituted on) 82'
Head Coach:
(Australia) Manfred Schaefer

GK	(Australia) Jeff Olver
DF	(Scotland) Ian McKie
DF	(Australia) Charlie Yankos	Yellow card
DF	(England) Don MacLeod
DF	(Australia) Jim Tansey
MF	(Australia) Theo Selemidis
MF	(Australia) Jim Campbell
MF	(Australia) Mike Valentine
FW	(England) Derek Lea
FW	(Australia) Gary Cole	Yellow card
FW	(Scotland) Steve Paterson
Head Coach:
(Australia) Jim Tansey

Match rules

- 90 minutes
- 30 minutes of extra time if necessary

==== Second leg ====
13 November 1983

Heidelberg United	0–1	Sydney Olympic
	Report	Patalis 82'

Olympic Park, Melbourne
Attendance: 6,000
Referee: Chris Bambridge

GK	(Australia) Jeff Olver
DF	(Scotland) Ian McKie
DF	(Australia) Charlie Yankos
DF	(England) Don MacLeod	Red card
DF	(Australia) Jim Tansey
MF	(Australia) Theo Selemidis
MF	(Australia) Jim Campbell
MF	(Australia) Mike Valentine
FW	(England) Derek Lea
FW	(Australia) Gary Cole
FW	(Scotland) Steve Paterson
Head Coach:
(Australia) Jim Tansey

GK	(Australia) Gary Meier
DF	(New Zealand) Ricki Herbert
DF	(England) Mick Coady
DF	(Australia) Graham Jennings
MF	(Australia) Tony Spyridakos
MF	(Australia) Jim Patikas
MF	(Australia) Gary Phillips
MF	(Australia) Peter Katholos
MF	(Australia) Mark Koussas
FW	(Australia) Terry Patalis
FW	(Australia) Marshall Soper
Head Coach:
(Australia) Manfred Schaefer

Match rules

- 90 minutes
- 30 minutes of extra time if necessary
- Penalty shoot-out if scores still level
