= 1982 Sydney Olympic FC season =

Sydney Olympic
1982 season
- Head Coach: Doug Collins; Lubo Gojkovic
- Stadium: Pratten Park
- National Soccer League: 8th
- NSL Cup: First round
- Top goalscorer: League: Mark Koussas (16); All: Mark Koussas (16)
- Highest home attendance: 12,186 vs. APIA Leichhardt (4 April 1982); National Soccer League
- Lowest home attendance: 3,428 vs. Preston Makedonia (15 August 1982); National Soccer League
- Average home league attendance: 6,257
- Biggest win: 5–0 vs. Brisbane City (H) (18 April 1982); National Soccer League
- Biggest defeat: 1–4 vs. Preston Makedonia (A) (9 May 1982); National Soccer League; 1–4 vs. Newcastle KB United (H) (6 June 1982); National Soccer League

The 1982 season was the sixth in the National Soccer League for Sydney Olympic Football Club. In addition to the domestic league, they also participated in the NSL Cup. Sydney Olympic finished 8th in their National Soccer League season, and were eliminated in first round of the NSL Cup.

== Players ==
Note: Flags indicate national team as defined under FIFA eligibility rules; some limited exceptions apply. Players may hold more than one non-FIFA nationality.

No.	Pos.	Nation	Player
—	DF	AUS	George Akoutas
—	DF	ENG	Mick Coady
—	FW	ENG	Tom Gavin
—	FW	AUS	Craig Hall
—	DF	AUS	Graham Jennings
—	MF	AUS	Peter Katholos
—		AUS	Michael Kelly
—	MF	AUS	Mark Koussas
—	GK	AUS	Gary Meier
—	DF	AUS	Danny Moulis

No.	Pos.	Nation	Player
—	MF	AUS	Gary Phillips
—	MF	AUS	Peter Raskopoulos
—	MF	ENG	Jimmy Redfern
—	DF	ENG	Martyn Rogers
—	DF	AUS	Ian Rowden
—	FW	AUS	Andy Scott
—	MF	AUS	Tony Spyridakos
—	DF	SCO	Ken Wilson
—	GK	AUS	Peter Wilson
—	DF	AUS	Jim Ziras

== Competitions ==
=== Overall record ===
Competition	First match	Last match	Starting round	Final position	Record							
Competition	First match	Last match	Starting round	Final position	Pld	W	D	L	GF	GA	GD	Win %
National Soccer League	14 February 1982	5 September 1982	Matchday 1	8th	30	12	6	12	52	42	+10	40.00
NSL Cup	14 June 1982		First round	First round	1	0	0	1	3	5	−2	0.00
Total					31	12	6	13	55	47	+8	38.71

Source: Competitions

=== National Soccer League ===
==== League table ====
Pos	Team	Pld	W	D	L	GF	GA	GD	Pts	Relegation
1	Sydney City (C)	30	20	5	5	68	28	+40	45	Qualification to Finals series (Note: The Finals series was not considered the championship for the 1982 National Soccer League.)
2	St George-Budapest	30	14	8	8	47	40	+7	36	Qualification to Finals series
3	Wollongong City	30	16	3	11	43	46	−3	35	Qualification to Finals series
4	Heidelberg United	30	13	8	9	42	37	+5	34	Qualification to Finals series
5	Preston Makedonia	30	12	10	8	45	41	+4	34	
6	South Melbourne	30	11	9	10	46	37	+9	31	
7	APIA Leichhardt	30	12	7	11	49	54	−5	31	
8	Sydney Olympic	30	12	6	12	52	42	+10	30	
9	West Adelaide	30	10	8	12	44	40	+4	28	
10	Marconi Fairfield	30	12	4	14	44	43	+1	28	
11	Brisbane Lions	30	10	8	12	39	42	−3	28	
12	Newcastle KB United	30	10	7	13	43	52	−9	27	
13	Adelaide City	30	6	12	12	36	44	−8	24	
14	Footscray JUST	30	5	14	11	34	46	−12	24	
15	Canberra City	30	7	10	13	37	54	−17	24	
16	Brisbane City	30	5	11	14	32	55	−23	21	

Source: rsssf.com
Rules for classification: 1) points; 2) goal difference; 3) number of goals scored.
(C) Champions

==== Results summary ====
Overall								Home						Away					
Pld	W	D	L	GF	GA	GD	Pts	W	D	L	GF	GA	GD	W	D	L	GF	GA	GD
30	12	6	12	52	42	+10	42	6	2	7	27	20	+7	6	4	5	25	22	+3

Source: worldfootball.net

==== Results by round ====
Round	1	2	3	4	5	6	7	8	9	10	11	12	13	14	15	16	17	18	19	20	21	22	23	24	25	26	27	28	29	30
Ground	A	H	A	H	A	H	A	H	A	H	A	H	A	H	H	A	H	A	H	A	H	A	H	A	H	A	H	A	A	H
Result	W	L	D	L	W	W	W	W	W	W	D	W	L	D	L	L	L	L	W	W	L	W	L	D	L	D	D	L	L	W
Position	1	6	7	10	8	6	2	2	2	1	1	1	1	1	3	5	5	6	5	3	4	3	4	5	7	6	6	9	9	8
Points	2	2	3	3	5	7	9	11	13	15	16	18	18	19	19	19	19	19	21	23	23	25	25	26	26	27	28	28	28	30

Source: worldfootball.net
A = Away; H = Home; W = Win; D = Draw; L = Loss

==== Matches ====
Win Draw Loss

14 February 1982 1	Newcastle KB United	0–3	Sydney Olympic	Newcastle
		Report	Katholos 49'; Gavin 58'; Jennings 61'	Stadium: Newcastle International Sports Centre; Attendance: 5,335; Referee: Jim Reeves

21 February 1982 2	Sydney Olympic	1–2	South Melbourne	Sydney
	Koussas 58'	Report	Evans 21', 48'	Stadium: Lambert Park; Attendance: 8,023; Referee: Dave Nugent

27 February 1982 3	Heidelberg United	2–2	Sydney Olympic	Melbourne
	Campbell 28'; Cole 51'	Report	Koussas 80'; Gavin 83'	Stadium: Olympic Park; Attendance: 4,500; Referee: David Yelland

7 March 1982 4	Sydney Olympic	1–2	Sydney City	Sydney
	Koussas 14'	Report	Murray 46'; Kosmina 51'	Stadium: Lambert Park; Attendance: 5,706; Referee: Doug Rennie

14 March 1982 5	St George-Budapest	1–2	Sydney Olympic	Sydney
	Marton 90'	Report	Koussas 34'; K. Wilson 84'	Stadium: St George Stadium; Attendance: 3,340; Referee: Ken Small

21 March 1982 6	Sydney Olympic	3–1	West Adelaide	Sydney
	Rowden 14'; Redfern 56', 78'	Report	Brown 35'	Stadium: Pratten Park; Attendance: 3,488; Referee: Tony Boskovic

28 March 1982 7	Adelaide City	2–3	Sydney Olympic	Adelaide
	Mitchell 27'; Nyskohus 65'	Report	Raskopoulos 36'; K. Wilson 54', 60'	Stadium: Olympic Sports Field; Attendance: 3,564; Referee: Graham Neal

4 April 1982 8	Sydney Olympic	2–0	APIA Leichhardt	Sydney
	Koussas 39'; Phillips 85'	Report		Stadium: Pratten Park; Attendance: 12,186; Referee: Richard Lorenc

11 April 1982 9	Marconi Fairfield	2–3	Sydney Olympic	Sydney
	Jankovics 24'; Calderan 80'	Report	Koussas 9'; Redfern 32', ?' (pen.)	Stadium: Marconi Stadium; Attendance: 10,812; Referee: Jim Reeves

18 April 1982 10	Sydney Olympic	5–0	Brisbane City	Sydney
	Koussas 5', 69', 86'; Katholos 12'; Rowden 28'	Report		Stadium: Pratten Park; Attendance: 6,740; Referee: Peter Rampley

25 April 1982 11	Brisbane Lions	1–1	Sydney Olympic	Brisbane
	Low 69'	Report	Jennings 21'	Stadium: Richlands Stadium; Attendance: 3,000; Referee: Col Amos

2 May 1982 12	Sydney Olympic	3–0	Footscray JUST	Sydney
	Koussas 11'; Redfern 80', 86'	Report		Stadium: Pratten Park; Attendance: 7,160; Referee: Ken Small

9 May 1982 13	Preston Makedonia	4–1	Sydney Olympic	Melbourne
	Lucchesi 40'; Ward 43'; Brown 47', 48'	Report	Redfern 66' (pen.)	Stadium: B.T. Connor Reserve; Attendance: 5,000; Referee: Evan Venios

16 May 1982 14	Sydney Olympic	0–0	Canberra City	Sydney
		Report		Stadium: Pratten Park; Attendance: 8,750; Referee: Doug Rennie

23 May 1982 15	Sydney Olympic	0–1	Wollongong City	Sydney
		Report	Adam 13' (pen.)	Stadium: Pratten Park; Attendance: 7,350; Referee: Ray Davies

30 May 1982 16	South Melbourne	2–1	Sydney Olympic	Melbourne
	Egan 46'; Blair 65'	Report	Katholos 64'	Stadium: Middle Park Soccer Stadium; Attendance: 7,000; Referee: Stewart Mellings

6 June 1982 17	Sydney Olympic	1–4	Newcastle KB United	Sydney
	Sneddon 40' (o.g.)	Report	Stamp 25'; Lowe 48'; Tredinnick 50'; Drinkwater 80'	Stadium: Pratten Park; Attendance: 6,120; Referee: Gary Power

13 June 1982 18	Sydney City	2–1	Sydney Olympic	Sydney
	Mitchell 4'; Murray 45'	Report	K. Wilson 47'	Stadium: ES Marks Athletics Field; Attendance: 5,600; Referee: Peter Rampley

20 June 1982 19	Sydney Olympic	3–2	Heidelberg United	Sydney
	Gavin 68'; Koussas 74'; Jennings 86'	Report	Paton 7'; Campbell 44'	Stadium: Pratten Park; Attendance: 4,432; Referee: Richard Lorenc

27 June 1982 20	West Adelaide	0–1	Sydney Olympic	Adelaide
		Report	Redfern 30'	Stadium: Hindmarsh Stadium; Attendance: 3,600; Referee: Jim Rossis

4 July 1982 21	Sydney Olympic	1–3	Adelaide City	Sydney
	Koussas 28'	Report	Villani 19', 44'; Manou 87'	Stadium: Pratten Park; Attendance: 4,457; Referee: Tim Davies

11 July 1982 22	APIA Leichhardt	0–3	Sydney Olympic	Sydney
		Report	Katholos 29', 36', 86'	Stadium: Lambert Park; Attendance: 6,484; Referee: Peter Rampley

18 July 1982 23	Sydney Olympic	1–2	Marconi Fairfield	Sydney
	Koussas 47'	Report	Hunter 42'; Jankovics ?'	Stadium: Pratten Park; Attendance: 5,657; Referee: Jim Reeves

25 July 1982 24	Brisbane City	1–1	Sydney Olympic	Brisbane
	Pimblett 60'	Report	Koussas 34'	Stadium: Spencer Park; Attendance: 2,000; Referee: Col Amos

1 August 1982 25	Sydney Olympic	0–1	Brisbane Lions	Sydney
		Report	Daunt 34'	Stadium: Pratten Park; Attendance: 4,807; Referee: Ken Small

8 August 1982 26	Footscray JUST	1–1	Sydney Olympic	Melbourne
	Lujic 36'	Report	Koussas 68'	Stadium: Schintler Reserve; Attendance: 3,195; Referee: Stewart Mellings

15 August 1982 27	Sydney Olympic	2–2	Preston Makedonia	Sydney
	Katholos 17', 67' (pen.)	Report	Ward 69'; McMillan 85'	Stadium: Pratten Park; Attendance: 3,428; Referee: Peter Rampley

22 August 1982 28	Canberra City	2–1	Sydney Olympic	Canberra
	Christopoulos 55'; Purdie 84'	Report	Wilson 59'	Stadium: Bruce Stadium; Attendance: 2,000; Referee: Don Campbell

29 August 1982 29	Wollongong City	2–1	Sydney Olympic	Wollongong
	Fontana 2'; O'Connor 9'	Report	K. Wilson 85'	Stadium: Wollongong Showground; Attendance: 4,200; Referee: Tony Boskovic

5 September 1982 30	Sydney Olympic	4–0	St George-Budapest	Sydney
	Redfern 28' (pen.), 35'; Koussas 67'; Katholos 88'	Report		Stadium: Pratten Park; Attendance: 5,547; Referee: Doug Rennie

=== NSL Cup ===
Win Draw Loss

14 June 1982 First round	APIA Leichhardt	5–3	Sydney Olympic	Sydney
	Bradley 42'; Burrows 56'; Giampaolo 70'; McBreen 84'; Soper 90'	Report	Jennings 24'; Redfern 73'; Gavin 77'	Stadium: Pratten Park; Attendance: 2,216; Referee: Tim Davies

== Statistics ==
=== Appearances and goals ===
Includes all competitions. Players with no appearances not included in the list.

No.	Pos	Nat	Player	Total		National Soccer League		NSL Cup	
No.	Pos	Nat	Player	Apps	Goals	Apps	Goals	Apps	Goals
	DF	(Australia) AUS	George Akoutas	4	0	3+1	0	0	0
	DF	(England) ENG	Mick Coady	9	0	8	0	1	0
	FW	(England) ENG	Tom Gavin	14	4	11+2	3	0+1	1
	FW	(Australia) AUS	Craig Hall	2	0	0+2	0	0	0
	DF	(Australia) AUS	Graham Jennings	31	4	29+1	3	1	1
	MF	(Australia) AUS	Peter Katholos	31	9	30	9	1	0
		(Australia) AUS	Michael Kelly	5	0	3+2	0	0	0
	MF	(Australia) AUS	Mark Koussas	29	16	26+2	16	1	0
	GK	(Australia) AUS	Gary Meier	10	0	9	0	1	0
	DF	(Australia) AUS	Danny Moulis	1	0	1	0	0	0
	MF	(Australia) AUS	Gary Phillips	20	1	18+1	1	1	0
	MF	(Australia) AUS	Peter Raskopoulos	29	1	28	1	1	0
	MF	(England) ENG	Jimmy Redfern	29	11	28	10	1	1
	DF	(England) ENG	Martyn Rogers	28	0	27	0	1	0
	DF	(Australia) AUS	Ian Rowden	28	2	26+2	2	0	0
	FW	(Australia) AUS	Andy Scott	19	0	18	0	1	0
	MF	(Australia) AUS	Tony Spyridakos	1	0	1	0	0	0
	DF	(Scotland) SCO	Ken Wilson	27	6	16+10	6	1	0
	GK	(Australia) AUS	Peter Wilson	21	0	21	0	0	0
	DF	(Australia) AUS	Jim Ziras	27	0	27	0	0	0

=== Disciplinary record ===
Includes all competitions. The list is sorted by squad number when total cards are equal. Players with no cards not included in the list.

No.	Pos	Nat	Player	Total			National Soccer League			NSL Cup		
No.	Pos	Nat	Player	Yellow card	Second yellow card	Red card	Yellow card	Second yellow card	Red card	Yellow card	Second yellow card	Red card
	MF	(Australia) AUS	Peter Raskopoulos	2	0	1	2	0	1	0	0	0
	DF	(Australia) AUS	Jim Ziras	3	0	0	3	0	0	0	0	0
	FW	(England) ENG	Tom Gavin	2	0	0	2	0	0	0	0	0
		(Australia) AUS	Michael Kelly	2	0	0	2	0	0	0	0	0
	MF	(Australia) AUS	Mark Koussas	2	0	0	2	0	0	0	0	0
	MF	(Australia) AUS	Peter Katholos	1	0	0	1	0	0	0	0	0
	MF	(England) ENG	Jimmy Redfern	1	0	0	1	0	0	0	0	0
	DF	(England) ENG	Martyn Rogers	1	0	0	1	0	0	0	0	0
	DF	(Australia) AUS	Ian Rowden	1	0	0	1	0	0	0	0	0
	FW	(Australia) AUS	Andy Scott	1	0	0	1	0	0	0	0	0
	MF	(Australia) AUS	Tony Spyridakos	1	0	0	1	0	0	0	0	0

- (yellow card) = Number of bookings; (second yellow card) = Number of sending offs after a second yellow card; (red card) = Number of sending offs by a direct red card.
