= List of Sydney Olympic FC players =

List of former and current players from Sydney Olympic FC that represented at New South Wales Premier League or National Soccer League level.

== Players ==
Player Land Position Date of Birth

=== A ===
- Fred Agius (Australia) MF 02.02.1984
- Siraj Al Tall (Jordan) FW 08.01.1982
- Andy Amegashie (Liberia) FW 03.09.1978
- Christos Ampos (Greece) FW 19.10.1937
- John Angelovski (Australia) DF 16.07.1976
- Zlatko Arambasic (Australia) FW 20.09.1969
- Walter Ardone (Australia) MF 30.01.1972
- Elias Augerinos (Australia) MF 31.10.1971
- William Angel (Australia) MF 01.02.1989

=== B ===
- Joe Bačak (Australia) MF 23.05.1973
- Scott Baillie (Australia) DF 11.03.1970
- Michael Baird (Australia) FW 01.08.1983
- Jim Bakis (Australia) FW 08.07.1979
- Danny Barbalace (Australia) DF 16.12.1973
- David Barrett (Australia) DF 21.06.1969
- Huseyin Bayhan (Australia) MF 25.12.1975
- Michael Beauchamp (Australia) DF 08.03.1981
- Richard Bell (Australia) MF 13.11.1955
- Jason Bennett (Australia) FW 19.06.1969
- Andy Bernal (Australia) DF 16.05.1966
- Adam Biddle (Australia) MF 27.07.1988
- Steven Biason (Australia) DF
- Milan Blagojevic (Australia) DF 24.12.1969
- Raul Blanco (Argentina) DF 04.12.1941
- Roy Blitz (Australia) FW 23.11.1941
- Ken Boden (Australia) MF 05.07.1950
- Predrag Bojić (Australia) DF 09.04.1984
- Clint Bolton (Australia) GK 22.08.1975
- Nick Bosevski (Australia) FW 02.12.1976
- Mark Bosnich (Australia) GK 13.01.1972
- George Bouhoutsos (Australia) GK 03.04.1969
- Dean Bouzanis (Australia) GK 02.10.1990
- Raphael Bove (Australia) MF 05.03.1977
- Tim Bredbury (Hong Kong) FW 25.04.1963
- Mark Brennan (England) MF 04.10.1965
- Jason Browne (Australia) FW 23.05.1987
- John Buonavoglia (Australia) FW 19.10.1975
- Mark Byrnes (Australia) DF 08.02.1982

=== C ===
- German Cabrera (Argentina) MF 15.09.1985
- Tim Cahill (Australia) MF 06.12.1979
- Joe Caleta (Australia) FW 30.05.1966
- Zenon Caravella (Australia) MF 17.03.1983
- Pablo Cardozo (Australia) FW 23.12.1972
- Richard Cardozo (Australia) MF 28.03.1986
- Leo Carle (Australia) MF 06.06.1980
- James Pitsi (Australia) MF 23.11.1981
- Andrew Carman (Australia) GK 11.02.1983
- Paul Carter (Australia) DF 17.07.1963
- Robert Catlin (Australia) GK 22.06.1965
- Morgan Cawley (Australia) MF 28.05.1981
- Adrian Cervinski (Australia) FW 17.11.1973
- Ken Chun (South Korea) DF
- Adam Ciantar (Australia) DF 15.03.1972
- Michael Cindric (Australia) DF 20.11.1982
- Shannon Cole (Australia) DF 04.08.1985
- Damon Collina (Australia) MF 13.09.1978
- Ron Corry (Australia) GK 21.07.1941
- Ante Covic (Australia) GK 13.06.1975
- Jason Culina (Australia) MF 05.08.1980

=== D ===
- Adam D'Apuzzo (Australia) MF 20.10.1986
- David D'Apuzzo (Australia) DF 05.09.1988
- Ivo De Jesus (Australia) MF 23.07.1976
- Stefan De Jesus (Australia) DF
- Jean-Paul de Marigny (Australia) DF 21.01.1964
- Gareth Deeg (Australia) GK 24.08.1978
- Steve Dalianis (Australia) FW 23.03.1974
- Ante Deur (Australia) MF 04.02.1980
- Arthur Diles (Australia) DF 22.04.1982
- Michael Di Meglio (Australia) MF 21.03.1985
- Anthony Doumanis (Australia) MF 01.02.1982
- John Doyle (Australia) FW 17.01.1946
- Bobby Dragas (Australia) DF 06.03.1978
- Mehmet Durakovic (Australia) AB 13.10.1965
- Andrew Durante (Australia) AB 03.05.1982
- Aleksandar Duric (Singapore) FW 12.08.1970

=== E ===
- Steve Eagleton (Australia) DF 26.10.1976
- Clive Eaton (Australia) FW
- Alistair Edwards (Australia) FW 21.06.1968
- Yahya El Hindi (Lebanon) MF 24.09.1998
- Giorgos Eleftheriadis (Greece) MF
- Tarek Elrich (Australia) MF 01.01.1987
- Brett Emerton (Australia) MF 22.02.1979
- Vince Estavilio (Uruguay) MF 17.05.1955

=== F ===
- Daniel Firth (Australia) FW
- Xavier Forsberg (Australia) DF
- Tony Franken (Australia) GK 11.01.1965
- Iain Fyfe (Australia) DF 03.04.1982

=== G ===
- Roger Galayini (Australia) MF 11.02.1983
- Robert Gaspar (Australia) MF 07.02.1981
- Emmanuel Giannaros (Australia) DF 22.04.1989
- Mike Gibson (Australia) GK 01.03.1963
- Rudolfo Gnavi (Australia) MF 17.09.1949
- Grant Gulabovski (Australia) MF
- Carlos Gonzalez (Australia) MF 23.11.1977
- Clint Gosling (New Zealand) TW 01.05.1960
- George Goutzioulis (Australia) DF 18.01.1978
- Andre Gumprecht (Germany) MF 26.12.1974

=== H ===
- Aman Hadid (Australia) FW 06.09.1988
- Labinot Haliti (Kosovo) MF 26.10.1984
- Troy Halpin (Australia) MF 17.08.1973
- George Haniotis (Australia) MF 04.06.1966
- Dave Harding (Australia) MF 14.09.1946
- Jeromy Harris (Australia) MF 07.08.1975
- Anthony Hartshorn (Australia) MF
- Ricki Herbert (New Zealand) DF 10.04.1961
- Michael Herbet (France) TW 27.07.1981
- Wassim Hijazi (Australia) FW 31.07.1984
- Matt Hilton (Australia) FW 27.02.1986
- Robert Hooker (Australia) DF 06.03.1967
- Eric Hristodoulou (Australia) MF 23.06.1970
- Dominik Hudak (Australia) DF
- Brett Hughes (Australia) GK 19.04.1969

=== I ===
- Chikelue Iloenyosi (Nigeria) DF 13.10.1980
- Robert Ironside (New Zealand) MF 20.08.1967
- Hiroyuki Ishida (Japan) MF 13.08.1979

=== J ===
- Harry James (Australia) FW 17.01.1976
- Graham Jennings (Australia) AB 18.01.1960
- Bojo Jevdjevic (Serbia) GK 08.01.1972
- Glenn Johnson (Australia) FW 16.07.1972
- Hussein Jomaa (Lebanon) MF 05.07.1979
- Ante Juric (Australia) DF 11.11.1973
- Mirko Jurilj (Australia) MF 04.11.1973
- Matthew Jurman (Australia) DF 08.12.1989

=== K ===
- Chris Kalantzis (Australia) MF 27.07.1968
- Jerry Kalouris (Greece) MF
- Steve Karavatakis (Australia) FW 17.07.1970
- Ivan Karlović (Australia) DF 20.12.1981
- Peter Katholos (Australia) MF 18.03.1961
- Jin Kim (South Korea) MF
- Corey King (Australia) MF
- Michael Kladis (Australia) MF 03.09.1977
- John Koch (Australia) DF 26.06.1968
- Paul Kohler (Australia) DF 05.08.1979
- Steven Koops (Australia) DF
- John Kosmina (Australia) FW 17.08.1956
- Jim Kourtis (Australia) GK 14.02.1973
- Mark Koussas (Australia) MF 09.01.1963
- James Kovas (Australia) FW 18.06.1983
- John Kyriazopoulos (Australia) MF 12.02.1980

=== L ===
- Sam La Rocca (Australia) MF 11.01.1978
- Kosta Lagoudakis (Australia) FW 11.05.1985
- Reuben Lagos (Australia) DF
- Sam Larolla (Australia) MF 11.01.1978
- Stephen Laybutt (Australia) DF 03.09.1977
- Grant Lee (Australia) MF 19.10.1961
- Bill Londos (Australia) GK 04.12.1964

=== M ===
- Dylan Macallister (Australia) FW 17.05.1982
- Scott Madden (Australia) MF
- Brad Maloney (Australia) MF 19.01.1972
- Gary Manuel (Australia) FW 20.02.1950
- Petar Markovic (Australia) DF 10.07.1983
- Krešimir Marušić (Australia) MF 23.11.1969
- James Masurkan (Australia) MF 8.5.1994 - †13 August 2010
- Esala Masi (Fiji) FW 09.03.1974
- Matthew Mayora (Australia) MF 10.03.1986
- Trent McClenahan (Australia) MF 04.02.1985
- Peter McPherson (Australia) FW 18.06.1984
- Gary Meier (Australia) GK 10.09.1955
- Jose Mendes (Australia) DF 11.08.1974
- Gabriel Mendez (Australia) MF 12.03.1973
- Nick Meredith (Australia) MF 11.12.1967
- Ante Milicic (Australia) FW 04.04.1974
- Branko Milosevic (Australia) MF 21.08.1964
- Lee Miot (Australia) FW 06.11.1981
- Dave Mitchell (Australia) FW 13.06.1962
- Glenn Moore (Australia) DF 24.02.1977
- Ante Moric (Australia) MF 19.04.1974
- Jim Morris (Scotland) DF 24.12.1957
- Glen Moss (New Zealand) GK 19.01.1983
- Danny Moulis (Australia) DF 25.07.1960
- Carlo Musumeci (Australia) DF
- Marino Musumeci (Australia) MF

=== N ===
- Zlatko Nastevski (North Macedonia) MF 04.08.1957
- Jim Nikas (Australia) FW 30.10.1975
- Jade North (Australia) DF 07.01.1982
- Chimaobi Nwaogazi (Nigeria) FW 27.11.1979

=== O ===
- Wayne O'Sullivan (Republic of Ireland) MF 25.02.1974
- Scott Ollerenshaw (Australia) (Malaysia) FW 09.02.1968
- Nick Orlic (Australia) DF 06.08.1970
- Greg Owens (Australia) MF 27.01.1981
- Soner Omac (Australia) GK 23.02.1975

=== Ö ===
- Tolgay Özbey (Australia) FW 12.04.1986

=== P ===
- Andrew Packer (Australia) MF 16.06.1980
- Adrian Pandolfa (Italy) MF
- Franco Parisi (Australia) FW 03.05.1983
- Tim Parker (Australia) MF 14.08.1984
- Jim Patikas (Australia) MF 18.10.1963
- Anthony Perri (Italy) MF
- John Perosh (Australia) GK 29.11.1973
- Angelo Petratos (Australia) MF 03.06.1968
- Gary Phillips (Australia) MF 09.06.1963
- Marcus Phillips (England) MF 17.10.1973
- Leon Pirrello (Australia) MF
- Derek Poimer (Australia) ST 04.12.1973
- Jason Polak (Australia) MF 09.01.1968
- Tom Pondeljak (Australia) MF 08.01.1976
- Adem Poric (Australia) MF 22.04.1973
- Joel Porter (Australia) FW 25.12.1978
- Davie Provan (Scotland) 08.05.1956

=== R ===
- Vlado Radic (Australia) MF 22.08.1965
- James Raiti (Australia) FW
- Iain Ramsay (Philippines) MF 27.02.1988
- Peter Raskopoulos (Australia) MF 22.02.1962
- Kain Rastall (Australia) MF 12.06.1978
- David Ratcliffe (Australia) DF 09.03.1957
- Steve Refenes (Australia) MF 19.02.1970
- Jono Reis (Brazil) FW
- Nick Rizzo (Australia) MF 09.06.1979
- Andre Rodrigues (Australia) MF 20.10.1973
- Martyn Rogers DF 26.01.1960
- Ivo Rudic (Australia) DF 24.01.1942
- Ian Rush (Wales) FW 20.10.1961

=== S ===
- Abbas Saad (Australia) FW 01.12.1967
- Scott Saville (Australia) MF 18.09.1968
- Giosue Antuan Sama (Australia) FW 02.10.1987
- Mass Sarr Jr (Liberia) FW 06.02.1973
- Joey Schirripa (Australia) DF 09.10.1982
- David Seal (Australia) FW 26.01.1972
- Joe Senkalski (Australia) MF 20.08.1957
- Craig Sharpley (Australia) MF 05.12.1969
- Nathan Sherlock (Australia) DF 02.02.1990
- Jordan Simpson (Australia) MF 28.08.1985
- Tyler Simpson (Australia) DF 28.08.1985
- Milorad Simonović (Australia) MF
- Sebastian Sinozic (Australia) DF 14.09.1978
- Chris Slater (Australia) FW 16.04.1970
- David Smith (Australia) DF
- Damien Smith (Australia) MF 26.04.1973
- Jacek Sobczyk (Australia) DF 02.09.1979
- Marshall Soper (Australia) FW 12.05.1960
- George Sorras (Australia) DF 11.04.1972
- George Souris (Australia) DF 12.11.1969
- Manny Spanoudakis (Australia) MF 12.06.1967
- Joe Spiteri (Australia) FW 06.05.1973
- Tony Spyridakos (Australia) MF 09.04.1964
- Wayne Srhoj (Australia) MF 23.03.1982
- Mitchell Stamatellis (Australia) DF
- Bruce Stowell (England) MF 20.09.1941
- George Strogylos (Australia) DF
- Brett Studman (Australia) DF 19.04.1985
- Milan Susak (Australia) DF 29.01.1984

=== T ===
- Kimon Taliadoros (Australia) FW 28.03.1968
- Daniel Taylor (Australia) MF
- Joel Theissen (Australia) MF 12.08.1985
- Nick Theodorakopoulos (Australia) FW 29.06.1964
- Scott Thomas (Australia) MF 19.08.1974
- Brendan Thorpe (Australia) MF 10.05.1996
- Steven Tibbetts (Australia) MF
- Norman Tome (Australia) FW 20.03.1973
- Christos Tomaras FW 14.01.1989
- Kris Trajanovski (Australia) FW 19.02.1972
- Peco Trajcevski (Australia) GK 11.10.1975
- Philip Trehern (Australia) DF 13.10.1975
- Chris Triantis (Australia) MF 12.10.1987
- Peter Tsekenis (Australia) MF 04.08.1973
- Nestor Tsioustas (Australia) GK
- Michael Turnbull (Australia) GK 24.03.1981

=== V ===
- George Valas (Australia) MF 15.07.1977

=== W ===
- Craig Wakefield (Australia) DF
- George Westwater (Australia) MF 26.03.1946
- Ben Willard (Australia) DF 31.12.1977
- Lindsay Wilson (Australia) MF 04.05.1979
- Paul Wither (Australia) MF

=== Z ===
- Peter Zairis (Australia) FW 30.03.1980
- Ivan Zelic (Australia) DF 24.02.1978
- Ned Zelic (Australia) DF 04.07.1971
- Fernando Zerda (Argentina) MF 01.09.1978
- Peter Zorbas (Australia) MF 14.05.1979
- Chris Zoricich (New Zealand) DF 03.05.1969
- Andy Zervas. (Australia) FW 04.05.1967
