= 1981 Sydney Olympic FC season =

Sydney Olympic
1981 season
- Head Coach: Tommy Docherty; Doug Collins
- Stadium: St George Stadium; Pratten Park
- National Soccer League: 9th
- NSL Cup: Third round
- Top goalscorer: Mark Koussas (10)
- Highest home attendance: 6,878 vs. Marconi Fairfield (12 April 1981); National Soccer League
- Lowest home attendance: 4,254 vs. Adelaide City (8 March 1981); National Soccer League
- Average home league attendance: 5,445
- Biggest win: 4–1 vs. Blacktown City (A) (23 August 1981); National Soccer League
- Biggest defeat: 0–3 vs. Brisbane City (A) (15 March 1981); National Soccer League

The 1981 season was the fourth in the National Soccer League for Sydney Olympic Football Club. In addition to the domestic league, they also participated in the NSL Cup. Sydney Olympic finished 9th in their National Soccer League season, and were eliminated in the third round of the NSL Cup.

== Players ==
Note: Flags indicate national team as defined under FIFA eligibility rules; some limited exceptions apply. Players may hold more than one non-FIFA nationality.

No.	Pos.	Nation	Player
1	GK	AUS	Gary Meier
2	DF	AUS	Danny Moulis
3	MF	ENG	Mike Cross
4	DF	SCO	Ken Wilson
5	DF	AUS	Ian Rowden
6	MF	AUS	Peter Katholos
7	MF	IRN	Hussein Housseini
8	MF	ENG	David Cork
9	FW	ENG	Tom Gavin
10	FW	AUS	Andy Scott
11	FW	AUS	Graham Jennings
12	DF	AUS	Greg Ankudinoff

No.	Pos.	Nation	Player
13	DF	AUS	Billy Palmer
14	FW	AUS	Clive Eaton
15	MF	AUS	Jim Ziras
16	MF	SCO	Alex Jamieson
18	FW	SCO	Derek Laing
19	FW	AUS	Mark Koussas
20	GK	AUS	Peter Wilson
—	DF	AUS	George Akoutas
—	MF	ENG	Roy Cotton
—	MF	AUS	Peter Raskopoulos
—	MF	ENG	Jimmy Redfern
—	FW	AUS	Chris Townson

== Competitions ==
=== Overall record ===
Competition	First match	Last match	Starting round	Final position	Record							
Competition	First match	Last match	Starting round	Final position	Pld	W	D	L	GF	GA	GD	Win %
National Soccer League	15 February 1981	13 September 1981	Matchday 1	9th	30	11	9	10	46	46	+0	36.67
NSL Cup	22 March 1981	16 June 1981	First round	Third round	3	2	0	1	7	5	+2	66.67
Total					33	13	9	11	53	51	+2	39.39

Source: Competitions

=== National Soccer League ===
==== League table ====
Pos	Team	Pld	W	D	L	GF	GA	GD	Pts	Relegation
1	Sydney City (C)	30	19	5	6	59	30	+29	43	
2	South Melbourne	30	13	13	4	41	27	+14	39	
3	Brisbane City	30	12	11	7	37	25	+12	35	
4	APIA Leichhardt	30	12	11	7	39	33	+6	35	
5	Canberra City	30	13	7	10	41	32	+9	33	
6	Brisbane Lions	30	11	11	8	41	33	+8	33	
7	Adelaide City	30	13	6	11	46	42	+4	32	
8	Heidelberg United	30	12	7	11	48	40	+8	31	
9	Sydney Olympic	30	11	9	10	46	46	0	31	
10	Newcastle KB United	30	11	8	11	41	41	0	30	
11	Wollongong City	30	8	12	10	35	39	−4	28	
12	Preston Makedonia	30	9	7	14	39	41	−2	25	
13	Footscray JUST	30	9	7	14	32	48	−16	25	
14	Marconi Fairfield	30	9	7	14	23	45	−22	25	
15	Blacktown City (R)	30	6	9	15	32	47	−15	21	Relegated to the 1982 NSW State League
16	West Adelaide	30	5	4	21	26	57	−31	14	

Updated to match(es) played on unknown. Source: rsssf.com
Rules for classification: 1) points; 2) goal difference; 3) number of goals scored.
(C) Champions; (R) Relegated

==== Results summary ====
Overall								Home						Away					
Pld	W	D	L	GF	GA	GD	Pts	W	D	L	GF	GA	GD	W	D	L	GF	GA	GD
30	11	9	10	46	46	0	42	8	5	2	25	17	+8	3	4	8	21	29	−8

Source: worldfootball.net

==== Results by round ====
Round	1	2	3	4	5	10	6	7	8	9	11	12	13	14	15	16	17	18	19	20	21	22	24	25	26	23	27	28	29	30
Ground	A	H	A	H	A	A	H	A	H	H	H	A	H	A	H	A	H	A	H	A	H	A	H	A	H	A	A	H	A	H
Result	L	D	L	W	L	L	D	L	W	W	D	D	W	W	L	D	W	L	D	L	L	L	W	D	W	W	W	D	D	W
Position	15	13	15	11	14	12	14	14	12	12	12	10	10	10	11	11	11	11	11	11	11	12	11	11	10	12	9	9	9	9
Points	0	1	1	3	3	3	4	4	6	8	9	10	12	14	14	15	17	17	18	18	18	18	20	21	23	25	27	28	29	31

Source: worldfootball.net
A = Away; H = Home; W = Win; D = Draw; L = Loss

==== Matches ====
Win Draw Loss

15 February 1981 1	Wollongong City	3–1	Sydney Olympic	Wollongong
14:00 AEDT	McBreen 35'; Campbell 55', 62'	Report		Stadium: Wollongong Showground; Attendance: Referee: Tony Boskovic

22 February 1981 2	Sydney Olympic	2–2	South Melbourne	Sydney
	Laing 38'; Koussas 43'	Report	Christopoulos 24', 61' (pen.)	Stadium: St George Stadium; Attendance: 4,813; Referee: Henry Witschge

1 March 1981 3	Preston Makedonia	3–1	Sydney Olympic	Melbourne
	Cullen 22'; Lucchesi 49'; Brown 85'	Report	Katholos 64'	Stadium: B.T. Connor Reserve; Attendance: 3,000; Referee: Evan Venios

8 March 1981 4	Sydney Olympic	3–1	Adelaide City	Sydney
	Jennings 69'; Koussas 75'; Laing 89'	Report	Ankudinoff 27' (o.g.)	Stadium: St George Stadium; Attendance: 4,254; Referee: Peter Rampley

15 March 1981 5	Brisbane City	3–0	Sydney Olympic	Brisbane
	P. Wilkinson 27'; Palinkas 67'; Hamilton 76'	Report		Stadium: Spencer Park; Attendance: 2,500; Referee: Dave Nugent

22 March 1981 10	Heidelberg United	1–0	Sydney Olympic	Melbourne
	Campbell 22'	Report		Stadium: Olympic Park; Attendance: 4,637; Referee: David Yelland

29 March 1981 6	Sydney Olympic	2–2	Sydney City	Sydney
	Raskopoulos 61'; Gavin 62'	Report	Boden 19'; Barnes 31'	Stadium: Pratten Park; Attendance: 4,728; Referee: Jim Reeves

5 April 1981 7	Canberra City	2–1	Sydney Olympic	Canberra
15:00 AEST	Brennan 64'; Gibson 72'	Report	Cotton 31'	Stadium: Bruce Stadium; Attendance: 5,682; Referee: Chris Bambridge

12 April 1981 8	Sydney Olympic	2–0	Marconi Fairfield	Sydney
	Katholos 72'; Cotton 79'	Report		Stadium: Pratten Park; Attendance: 6,878; Referee: Tony Boskovic

19 April 1981 9	Sydney Olympic	3–1	West Adelaide	Sydney
	Raskopoulos 25'; Cotton 30'; Koussas 51'	Report	Tymczyszyn 35' (pen.)	Stadium: Pratten Park; Attendance: 6,120; Referee: Tim Davies

3 May 1981 11	Sydney Olympic	0–0	Footscray JUST	Sydney
		Report		Stadium: Pratten Park; Attendance: 5,675; Referee: Peter Rampley

10 May 1981 12	Brisbane Lions	1–1	Sydney Olympic	Brisbane
	Millman 29'	Report	Jennings 53'	Stadium: Richlands Stadium; Attendance: 1,500; Referee: Des Miles

17 May 1981 13	Sydney Olympic	1–0	Blacktown City	Sydney
	Wilson 88' (pen.)	Report		Stadium: Pratten Park; Attendance: 5,200; Referee: Henry Witschge

24 May 1981 14	Newcastle KB United	1–2	Sydney Olympic	Newcastle
	Mountford 9'	Report	K. Wilson 45'; Jennings 71'	Stadium: Newcastle International Sports Centre; Attendance: 5,545; Referee: Alf Rodway

31 May 1981 15	Sydney Olympic	1–3	APIA Leichhardt	Sydney
	P. Wilson 79' (o.g.)	Report	Kafka 32'; Morsello 59'; Pirie 90'	Stadium: Pratten Park; Attendance: 5,378; Referee: Gary Power

7 June 1981 16	South Melbourne	1–1	Sydney Olympic	Melbourne
	Evans 23'	Report	Raskopoulos 28'	Stadium: Middle Park Soccer Stadium; Attendance: 12,000; Referee: Don Campbell

14 June 1981 17	Sydney Olympic	2–1	Preston Makedonia	Sydney
	Koussas 33'; Jennings 38'	Report	Whittle 70'	Stadium: Pratten Park; Attendance: 6,150; Referee: Tony Boskovic

21 June 1981 18	Adelaide City	3–1	Sydney Olympic	Adelaide
	Melta 20'; Mitchell 36'; Fashanu 62'	Report	K. Wilson 53' (pen.)	Stadium: Olympic Sports Field; Attendance: 3,500; Referee: Graham Neal

28 June 1981 19	Sydney Olympic	1–1	Brisbane City	Sydney
	Rowden 77'	Report	P. Wilkinson 32'	Stadium: Pratten Park; Attendance: 5,346; Referee: Peter Rampley

5 July 1981 20	Sydney City	5–4	Sydney Olympic	Sydney
15:00 AEST	Cant 14'; Souness 21'; Barnes 31', 39', 64'	Report	Koussas 36', 89'; Raskopoulos 66'; Jennings 71'	Stadium: ES Marks Athletics Field; Attendance: 6,892; Referee: Peter Rampley

12 July 1981 21	Sydney Olympic	0–2	Canberra City	Sydney
		Report	Purdie 31'; Gibson 68'	Stadium: Pratten Park; Attendance: 6,150; Referee: Richard Lorenc

19 July 1981 22	Marconi Fairfield	2–1	Sydney Olympic	Sydney
15:00 AEST	Johnston 29'; Jankovics 56'	Report	Katholos 84'	Stadium: Marconi Stadium; Attendance: 7,319; Referee: Gary Power

2 August 1981 24	Sydney Olympic	2–1	Heidelberg United	Sydney
	K. Wilson 10', 47' (pen.)	Report	Campbell 68'	Stadium: Pratten Park; Attendance: 5,600; Referee: Col Amos

9 August 1981 25	Footscray JUST	1–1	Sydney Olympic	Melbourne
	Kakantonis 60'	Report	Redfern 79'	Stadium: Schintler Reserve; Attendance: 1,300; Referee: David Yelland

16 August 1981 26	Sydney Olympic	3–1	Brisbane Lions	Sydney
	Koussas 46'; Redfern 47'; Raskopoulos 87'	Report	Williamson 55'	Stadium: Pratten Park; Attendance: 5,728; Referee: Gary Power

19 August 1981 23	West Adelaide	0–1	Sydney Olympic	Adelaide
		Report	Koussas 1'	Stadium: Hindmarsh Stadium; Attendance: 1,500; Referee: Jim Rossis

23 August 1981 27	Blacktown City	1–4	Sydney Olympic	Sydney
	Djordjevic 90'	Report	Koussas 27', 38'; Redfern 43'; Gavin 62'	Stadium: Gabbie Stadium; Attendance: 4,462; Referee: Bob Mee

30 August 1981 28	Sydney Olympic	1–1	Newcastle KB United	Sydney
	Wilson 45'	Report	Stamp 87'	Stadium: Pratten Park; Attendance: 5,155; Referee: Tony Boskovic

6 September 1981 29	APIA Leichhardt	2–2	Sydney Olympic	Sydney
	O'Connor 17'; Giampaolo 69'	Report	Cross 3'; Katholos 84'	Stadium: Lambert Park; Attendance: 7,821; Referee: Peter Rampley

13 September 1981 30	Sydney Olympic	2–1	Wollongong City	Sydney
	Ziras 70' (pen.); Raskopoulos 84'	Report	Campbell 18'	Stadium: Pratten Park; Attendance: 4,500; Referee: Richard Lorenc

=== NSL Cup ===
Win Draw Loss

22 March 1981 First round	Edgeworth Eagles	1–2	Sydney Olympic	Newcastle
	Kemp 62'	Report	Cross 55'; Raskoupoulos 87'	Stadium: Macquarie Field; Attendance: 2,000; Referee: Alf Rodway

8 June 1981 Second round	Canberra City	2–4	Sydney Olympic	Canberra
	Gibson ?'; Maclaren 63'	Report	Koussas 8', 40'; Wilson ?'; Rowden 25'	Stadium: Bruce Stadium; Attendance: 4,300; Referee: Tim Davies

16 June 1981 Third round	APIA Leichhardt	2–1	Sydney Olympic	Sydney
	O'Connor 35'; Soper 72'	Report	Cotton 78'	Stadium: Sydney Sports Ground; Attendance: 5,765; Referee: Chris Bambridge

== Statistics ==
=== Appearances and goals ===
Includes all competitions. Players with no appearances not included in the list.

No.	Pos.	Nat.	Player	National Soccer League		NSL Cup		Total	
No.	Pos.	Nat.	Player	Apps	Goals	Apps	Goals	Apps	Goals
1	GK	(Australia)	Gary Meier	9+1	0	0	0	10	0
2	DF	(Australia)	Danny Moulis	26+1	1	3	0	30	1
3	MF	(Australia)	Mike Cross	10+7	1	2+1	1	20	2
4	DF	(Scotland)	Ken Wilson	24+1	6	2	1	27	7
5	DF	(Australia)	Ian Rowden	22+1	1	3	1	26	2
6	MF	(Australia)	Peter Katholos	27+1	4	1	0	29	4
7	MF	(Iran)	Hussein Housseini	3+2	0	0	0	5	0
8	MF	(England)	David Cork	5	0	0	0	5	0
9	FW	(England)	Tom Gavin	5+4	2	1	0	10	2
10	FW	(Australia)	Andy Scott	13+3	0	2	0	18	0
11	FW	(Australia)	Graham Jennings	30	5	3	0	33	5
12	DF	(Australia)	Greg Ankudinoff	4+1	0	0	0	5	0
13	DF	(Australia)	Billy Palmer	13+2	0	1	0	16	0
14	FW	(Australia)	Clive Eaton	0+1	0	0	0	1	0
15	MF	(Australia)	Jim Ziras	27	1	3	0	30	1
16	MF	(Scotland)	Alex Jamieson	5+8	0	0	0	13	0
18	FW	(Scotland)	Derek Laing	21+2	2	3	0	26	2
19	FW	(Australia)	Mark Koussas	25	10	3	2	28	12
20	GK	(Australia)	Peter Wilson	21	0	3	0	24	0
—	DF	(Australia)	George Akoutas	1+1	0	0	0	2	0
—	MF	(England)	Roy Cotton	10+3	3	0+2	1	15	4
—	MF	(Australia)	Peter Raskopoulos	22	6	3	1	25	7
—	MF	(England)	Jimmy Redfern	6+1	0	0	0	7	0
—	FW	(Australia)	Chris Townson	1+2	0	0	0	3	0

=== Disciplinary record ===
Includes all competitions. The list is sorted by squad number when total cards are equal. Players with no cards not included in the list.

Rank	No.	Pos.	Nat.	Player	National Soccer League			NSL Cup			Total		
Rank	No.	Pos.	Nat.	Player	Yellow card	Second yellow card	Red card	Yellow card	Second yellow card	Red card	Yellow card	Second yellow card	Red card
1	6	MF	(Australia)	Peter Katholos	1	0	1	0	0	0	1	0	1
2	2	DF	(Australia)	Danny Moulis	4	0	0	0	0	0	4	0	0
3	15	MF	(Australia)	Jim Ziras	3	0	0	0	0	0	3	0	0
3	—	MF	(Australia)	Peter Raskopoulos	3	0	0	0	0	0	3	0	0
5	3	MF	(England)	Mike Cross	1	0	0	0	0	0	1	0	0
5	4	DF	(Scotland)	Ken Wilson	1	0	0	0	0	0	1	0	0
5	10	FW	(Australia)	Andy Scott	1	0	0	0	0	0	1	0	0
5	12	DF	(Australia)	Greg Ankudinoff	1	0	0	0	0	0	1	0	0
5	19	FW	(Australia)	Andy Scott	1	0	0	0	0	0	1	0	0
5	—	MF	(England)	Roy Cotton	1	0	0	0	0	0	1	0	0
Total					17	0	1	0	0	0	17	0	1

=== Clean sheets ===
Includes all competitions. The list is sorted by squad number when total clean sheets are equal. Numbers in parentheses represent games where both goalkeepers participated and both kept a clean sheet; the number in parentheses is awarded to the goalkeeper who was substituted on, whilst a full clean sheet is awarded to the goalkeeper who was on the field at the start of play. Goalkeepers with no clean sheets not included in the list.

Rank	No.	Nat.	Goalkeeper	NSL	NSL Cup	Total
1	20	(Australia)	Peter Wilson	3	0	3
2	1	(Australia)	Gary Meier	1	0	1
Total				4	0	4
