= 1979 Canberra City FC season =

Canberra City
1979 season
- Head Coach: Vic Fernandez
- Stadium: Bruce Stadium
- National Soccer League: 12th
- NSL Cup: Semi-finals
- Top goalscorer: League: Terry Byrne (9); All: Terry Byrne (13)
- Highest home attendance: 7,510 vs. Brisbane Lions (10 June 1979); National Soccer League
- Lowest home attendance: 1,500 vs. West Woden (25 April 1979); NSL Cup
- Average home league attendance: 4,229
- Biggest win: 4–0 vs. Essendon Croatia (23 May 1979); NSL Cup
- Biggest defeat: 1–5 vs. Newcastle KB United (18 August 1979); National Soccer League

The 1979 season was the third in the history of Canberra City Football Club. In addition to the domestic league, they also participated in the NSL Cup. Canberra City finished 12th in their National Soccer League season, and were eliminated in the semi-finals of the NSL Cup.

== Players ==
Note: Flags indicate national team as defined under FIFA eligibility rules; some limited exceptions apply. Players may hold more than one non-FIFA nationality.

No.	Pos.	Nation	Player
1	GK	AUS	Steve Hoszowski
2	DF	AUS	Danny Moulis
3	DF	AUS	Milan Milovanovic
4	DF	AUS	Steve Hogg
5	DF	AUS	Harry Williams
6		ARG	Luis Salgado
7	MF	AUS	Jose Arquero
8	MF	YUG	Ivan Grujicic
9	DF	AUS	Terry Byrne
10	MF	AUS	John Davies
11	MF	AUS	Phil Reis
12	DF	FIJ	Keni Kawaleva
13	FW	ENG	George Bailey

No.	Pos.	Nation	Player
14	MF	SCO	Isaac Farrell
15	DF	ENG	Roy Stark
16	DF	SCO	John Brown
17	FW	SCO	Don Maclaren
18	MF	AUS	Jimmy Cant
19	FW	AUS	Bernard Lustica
20	GK	AUS	David Lindenmayer
—	MF	ENG	Ian Callaghan (on loan from Swansea City)
—	MF	ENG	Paul Fielding
—	FW	AUS	Alan Reis
—		AUS	Brian Stoddart
—	FW	AUS	Kosta Talevski

== Competitions ==
=== Overall record ===
Competition	First match	Last match	Starting round	Final position	Record							
Competition	First match	Last match	Starting round	Final position	Pld	W	D	L	GF	GA	GD	Win %
National Soccer League	11 March 1979	23 September 1979	Matchday 1	12th	26	6	8	12	25	41	−16	23.08
NSL Cup	25 April 1979	12 August 1979	First round	Semi-finals	4	3	0	1	11	3	+8	75.00
Total					30	9	8	13	36	44	−8	30.00

Source: Competitions

=== National Soccer League ===
==== League table ====
Pos	Team	Pld	W	D	L	GF	GA	GD	Pts	Qualification or relegation
1	Marconi Fairfield (C)	26	15	6	5	58	32	+26	40 (Note: A Bonus Point was awarded for victories of 4 goals or more.)	Qualification to Finals series (Note: The Finals series was not considered the championship for the 1979 National Soccer League.)
2	Heidelberg United	26	14	7	5	44	30	+14	36	Qualification to Finals series
3	Sydney City	26	15	3	8	47	29	+18	34	Qualification to Finals series
4	Brisbane City	26	14	5	7	38	30	+8	34	Qualification to Finals series
5	Adelaide City	26	13	6	7	43	27	+16	33	
6	Newcastle KB United	26	11	9	6	43	30	+13	32	
7	West Adelaide	26	10	4	12	28	31	−3	25	
8	APIA Leichhardt	26	11	3	12	29	37	−8	25	
9	Brisbane Lions	26	8	6	12	28	40	−12	22	
10	Footscray JUST	26	8	3	15	29	43	−14	20	
11	St George-Budapest	26	7	6	13	27	43	−16	20	
12	Canberra City	26	6	8	12	25	41	−16	20	
13	Sydney Olympic (R)	26	7	5	14	23	30	−7	19	Relegated to the 1980 NSW State League
14	South Melbourne	26	6	3	17	26	45	−19	16	

Updated to match(es) played on unknown. Source: rsssf.com
Rules for classification: 1) points; 2) goal difference; 3) number of goals scored.
(C) Champions; (R) Relegated

==== Results summary ====
Overall								Home						Away					
Pld	W	D	L	GF	GA	GD	Pts	W	D	L	GF	GA	GD	W	D	L	GF	GA	GD
26	6	8	12	25	41	−16	26	2	4	7	12	24	−12	4	4	5	13	17	−4

Source: worldfootball.net

==== Results by round ====
Round	1	2	3	4	5	6	7	8	9	10	11	12	13	14	16	17	18	19	15	20	21	22	23	24	25	26
Ground	H	A	H	A	H	A	H	A	H	A	A	H	A	H	H	A	A	H	A	A	H	A	H	H	A	H
Result	W	W	L	D	D	W	D	W	L	D	L	L	L	D	W	W	L	D	D	L	L	D	L	L	L	L
Position	5	2	5	9	8	5	4	4	5	5	7	9	9	9	9	9	9	9	8	9	9	9	9	9	11	12
Points	2	4	4	5	6	8	9	11	11	12	12	12	12	13	15	17	17	18	19	19	19	20	20	20	20	20

Source: worldfootball.net
A = Away; H = Home; W = Win; D = Draw; L = Loss

==== Matches ====
Win Draw Loss

11 March 1979 1	Canberra City	3–1	Marconi Fairfield	Canberra
	Fielding 49'; Byrne 63'; Davies 89'	Report	Jankovics 30'	Stadium: Bruce Stadium; Attendance: 6,845; Referee: Ken Allen

18 March 1979 2	St George-Budapest	2–4	Canberra City	Sydney
	O'Connor 31'; Morgan 51'	Report	Stark 3', 26'; Salgado 6'; Moulis 74'	Stadium: St George Stadium; Attendance: 2,250; Referee: Henry Witschge

25 March 1979 3	Canberra City	0–3	Footscray JUST	Canberra
		Report	Picioane 50'; Palinkas 57'; Ristovski 66'	Stadium: Bruce Stadium; Attendance: 7,321; Referee: Stewart Mellings

1 April 1979 4	South Melbourne	1–1	Canberra City	Melbourne
	Cummings 53'	Report	Byrne 35'	Stadium: Middle Park Soccer Stadium; Attendance: 5,200; Referee: Graham Neale

7 April 1979 5	Canberra City	0–0	West Adelaide	Canberra
		Report		Stadium: Bruce Stadium; Attendance: 5,300; Referee: Jack Wood

15 April 1979 6	Brisbane City	0–1	Canberra City	Brisbane
		Report	Grujicic 80'	Stadium: Perry Park; Attendance: 1,500; Referee: Jim Reeves

21 April 1979 7	Canberra City	0–0	APIA Leichhardt	Canberra
		Report		Stadium: Bruce Stadium; Attendance: 5,300; Referee: Ken Allen

28 April 1979 8	Newcastle KB United	0–2	Canberra City	Newcastle
		Report	Davies 7'; Byrne 89'	Stadium: Newcastle International Sports Centre; Attendance: 8,359; Referee: Tony Boskovic

5 May 1979 9	Canberra City	1–3	Sydney Olympic	Canberra
	Grujicic 82' (pen.)	Report	Wilson 38'; Jennings 80'; Eaton 85'	Stadium: Bruce Stadium; Attendance: 5,000; Referee: Dave Nugent

13 May 1979 10	Heidelberg United	0–0	Canberra City	Melbourne
		Report		Stadium: Olympic Park; Attendance: 4,000; Referee: Jack Johnston

3 June 1979 11	Adelaide City	2–1	Canberra City	Adelaide
	Villani 75'; Northcote 81'	Report	Moulis 48'	Stadium: Olympic Sports Field; Attendance: 5,200; Referee: Graham Neal

10 June 1979 12	Canberra City	1–2	Brisbane Lions	Canberra
	Grujicic 82'	Report	Wilson 59'; Brennan 87'	Stadium: Bruce Stadium; Attendance: 7,510; Referee: Ken Allen

17 June 1979 13	Sydney City	2–1	Canberra City	Sydney
	Watson 67'; Barnes 84'	Report	Byrne 40'	Stadium: Wentworth Park; Attendance: 2,378; Referee: Tim Davies

24 June 1979 14	Canberra City	1–1	St George-Budapest	Canberra
	Byrne 34'	Report	Cotton 83'	Stadium: Bruce Stadium; Attendance: 3,220; Referee: Bob Mee

7 July 1979 16	Canberra City	3–2	South Melbourne	Canberra
	Byrne 14', 59'; Maclaren (?)	Report	Lutton 4'; Evans 49'	Stadium: Bruce Stadium; Attendance: 2,225; Referee: Doug Rennie

15 July 1979 17	Footscray JUST	1–2	Canberra City	Melbourne
	Ollerton 47'	Report	Maclaren 57'; Byrne 63'	Stadium: Olympic Park; Attendance: 1,000; Referee: Graham Neal

22 July 1979 18	West Adelaide	2–0	Canberra City	Adelaide
	Norris 57'; Tymczyszyn 67'	Report		Stadium: Hindmarsh Stadium; Attendance: 2,700; Referee: Chris Bambridge

28 July 1979 19	Canberra City	0–0	Brisbane City	Canberra
		Report		Stadium: Bruce Stadium; Attendance: 3,378; Referee: Bob Mee

1 August 1979 15	Marconi Fairfield	1–1	Canberra City	Sydney
	Krncevic 83'	Report	Byrne 62'	Stadium: Marconi Oval; Attendance: 3,725; Referee: Henry Witschge

5 August 1979 20	APIA Leichhardt	3–0	Canberra City	Sydney
	Reed 5', 46'; McGinn 80'	Report		Stadium: Wentworth Park; Attendance: 3,728; Referee: Henry Witschge

18 August 1979 21	Canberra City	1–5	Newcastle KB United	Canberra
	Farrell 67'	Report	Moulis 45' (o.g.); Heys 47'; McClelland 60'; Boden 67', 83'	Stadium: Bruce Stadium; Attendance: 2,750; Referee: Dave Nugent

26 August 1979 22	Sydney Olympic	0–0	Canberra City	Sydney
		Report		Stadium: Pratten Park; Attendance: 1,462; Referee: Peter Rampley

1 September 1979 23	Canberra City	1–2	Heidelberg United	Canberra
	Farrell 32'	Report	Buljevic 2'; Milovanovic 75' (o.g.)	Stadium: Bruce Stadium; Attendance: 2,128; Referee: Ken Allen

8 September 1979 24	Canberra City	0–2	Adelaide City	Canberra
		Report	Villani 10', 63'	Stadium: Bruce Stadium; Attendance: 2,314; Referee: Stewart Mellings

16 September 1979 25	Brisbane Lions	3–0	Canberra City	Brisbane
	Hughes 66', 86'; Brennan 89'	Report		Stadium: Perry Park; Attendance: 1,460; Referee: Peter Rampley

23 September 1979 26	Canberra City	1–3	Sydney City	Canberra
	Moulis 26'	Report	Trenter 26', 61', 77'	Stadium: Bruce Stadium; Attendance: 1,685; Referee: Chris Bambridge

=== NSL Cup ===
Win Draw Loss

25 April 1979 First round	Canberra City	3–1	(Australian Capital Territory) West Woden	Canberra
	Grujicic 28'; Brown 66'; Fielding 70'	Report	Wate 21'	Stadium: Bruce Stadium; Attendance: 1,500; Referee: Doug Rennie

23 May 1979 Second round	Canberra City	4–0	(Victoria (state)) Essendon Croatia	Canberra
	Stark 44'; Byrne 75', 77'; Moulis 89'	Report		Stadium: Bruce Stadium; Attendance: 3,000; Referee: Tim Davies

27 May 1979 Quarter-finals	Canberra City	4–1	Footscray JUST	Canberra
	Byrne 75', 77'; Cant 50'; Grujicic 81'	Report	Ilioski 87'	Stadium: Bruce Stadium; Attendance: 4,972; Referee: Richard Lorenc

12 August 1979 Semi-finals	Adelaide City	1–0	Canberra City	Adelaide
	Northcote 4'	Report		Stadium: Olympic Sports Field; Attendance: 3,100; Referee: Stewart Mellings

== Statistics ==
=== Appearances and goals ===
Includes all competitions. Players with no appearances not included in the list.

No.	Pos.	Nat.	Player	National Soccer League		NSL Cup		Total	
No.	Pos.	Nat.	Player	Apps	Goals	Apps	Goals	Apps	Goals
1	GK	(Australia)	Steve Hoszowski	26	0	4	0	30	0
2	DF	(Australia)	Danny Moulis	26	3	4	1	30	4
3	DF	(Australia)	Milan Milovanovic	21	0	4	0	25	0
4	DF	(Australia)	Steve Hogg	9+4	0	1	0	14	0
5	DF	(Australia)	Harry Williams	2+2	0	2	0	6	0
6	—	(Argentina)	Luis Salgado	10	1	2	0	12	1
7	MF	(Australia)	Jose Arquero	3	0	0	0	3	0
8	MF	(Socialist Federal Republic of Yugoslavia)	Ivan Grujicic	3+13	3	1+2	2	19	5
9	DF	(Australia)	Terry Byrne	26	9	4	4	30	13
10	MF	(Australia)	John Davies	22+1	2	3	0	26	2
11	MF	(Australia)	Phil Reis	1+1	0	0	0	2	0
12	DF	(Fiji)	Keni Kawaleva	11+5	0	1+1	0	18	0
13	FW	(England)	George Bailey	4+3	0	0+1	0	8	0
14	MF	(Scotland)	Isaac Farrell	20	2	3	0	23	2
15	DF	(England)	Roy Stark	17	2	3	1	20	3
16	DF	(Scotland)	John Brown	26	0	4	1	30	1
17	FW	(Scotland)	Don Maclaren	12+1	2	1	0	14	2
18	MF	(Australia)	Jimmy Cant	23+1	0	4	1	28	1
19	FW	(Australia)	Bernard Lustica	4+2	0	0	0	6	0
20	GK	(Australia)	David Lindemayer	0	0	0+1	0	1	0
—	MF	(England)	Ian Callaghan	9	0	1	0	10	0
—	MF	(England)	Paul Fielding	11+5	1	3	1	19	2
—	FW	(Australia)	Alan Reis	0+1	0	0	0	1	0
—	—	(Australia)	Brian Stoddart	0+1	0	0	0	1	0
—	FW	(Australia)	Kosta Talevski	0+1	0	0+1	0	2	0

=== Disciplinary record ===
Includes all competitions. The list is sorted by squad number when total cards are equal. Players with no cards not included in the list.

Rank	No.	Pos.	Nat.	Player	National Soccer League			NSL Cup			Total		
Rank	No.	Pos.	Nat.	Player	Yellow card	Second yellow card	Red card	Yellow card	Second yellow card	Red card	Yellow card	Second yellow card	Red card
1	16	DF	(Scotland)	John Brown	3	0	0	2	0	0	5	0	0
2	3	DF	(Australia)	Mike Milovanovic	3	0	0	1	0	0	4	0	0
2	12	DF	(Fiji)	Keni Kawaleva	4	0	0	0	0	0	4	0	0
4	17	FW	(Scotland)	Don Maclaren	2	0	0	0	0	0	2	0	0
5	2	DF	(Australia)	Danny Moulis	1	0	0	0	0	0	1	0	0
5	6	—	(Argentina)	Luis Salgado	0	0	0	1	0	0	1	0	0
5	9	DF	(Australia)	Terry Byrne	0	0	0	1	0	0	1	0	0
5	15	DF	(Australia)	Roy Stark	1	0	0	0	0	0	1	0	0
5	18	MF	(Australia)	Jimmy Cant	1	0	0	0	0	0	1	0	0
Total					16	0	0	4	0	0	20	0	0

=== Clean sheets ===
Includes all competitions. The list is sorted by squad number when total clean sheets are equal. Numbers in parentheses represent games where both goalkeepers participated and both kept a clean sheet; the number in parentheses is awarded to the goalkeeper who was substituted on, whilst a full clean sheet is awarded to the goalkeeper who was on the field at the start of play. Goalkeepers with no clean sheets not included in the list.

Rank	No.	Nat.	Goalkeeper	NSL	NSL Cup	Total
1	1	(Australia)	Steve Hoszowski	7	1	8
Total				7	1	8
