= 1982 Footscray JUST season =

Footscray JUST
1982 season
- Head Coach: Milenko Rusmir; Peter Jaksa; Jim Milne
- Stadium: Schintler Reserve
- National Soccer League: 14th
- NSL Cup: First round
- Top goalscorer: League: Paul Simic (8); All: Paul Simic (8)
- Highest home attendance: 5,000 vs. South Melbourne (28 March 1982); National Soccer League
- Lowest home attendance: 535 vs. St George-Budapest (14 February 1982); National Soccer League
- Average home league attendance: 2,357
- Biggest win: 2–0 (3 times); 3–1 (once)
- Biggest defeat: 1–7 vs. Brisbane Lions (7 March 1982); National Soccer League
Home colours	Away colours

The 1982 season was the sixth in the National Soccer League for Footscray JUST. In addition to the domestic league, they also participated in the NSL Cup. Footscray JUST finished 14th in their National Soccer League season, and were eliminated in the first round of the NSL Cup.

== Players ==
Note: Flags indicate national team as defined under FIFA eligibility rules; some limited exceptions apply. Players may hold more than one non-FIFA nationality.

No.	Pos.	Nation	Player
—	MF	AUS	Vlatko Belic
—	GK	SCO	Dennis Boland
—		AUS	Milutin Ciric
—	FW	AUS	Bruno Cozzella
—	MF	AUS	Suleiman Curovic
—		AUS	Jusuf Hatunic
—	DF	YUG	Igor Hazabent
—	MF	AUS	Zoran Ilioski
—	MF	YUG	Slobodan Jovanovic
—	FW	YUG	Milan Kojic
—		AUS	Slobodan Popovic

No.	Pos.	Nation	Player
—	DF	GRE	Jim Kondarios
—		AUS	Mike Kupinic
—	DF	AUS	Kyri Kyriakouleas
—	MF	YUG	Zdravko Lujic
—	DF	AUS	Jim Milne
—	DF	SCO	Jim O'Reilly
—		AUS	Vlado Pljevaljcic
—	FW	AUS	Mendo Ristovski
—	FW	AUS	Paul Simic
—	DF	AUS	Slobodan Stojcevski
—	FW	YUG	Dragan Vasic

== Competitions ==
=== Overall record ===
Competition	First match	Last match	Starting round	Final position	Record							
Competition	First match	Last match	Starting round	Final position	Pld	W	D	L	GF	GA	GD	Win %
National Soccer League	14 February 1982	5 September 1982	Matchday 1	14th	30	5	14	11	34	46	−12	16.67
NSL Cup	14 June 1982		First round	First round	1	0	0	1	0	2	−2	0.00
Total					31	5	14	12	34	48	−14	16.13

Source: Competitions

=== National Soccer League ===
==== League table ====
Pos	Team	Pld	W	D	L	GF	GA	GD	Pts	Relegation
1	Sydney City (C)	30	20	5	5	68	28	+40	45	Qualification to Finals series (Note: The Finals series was not considered the championship for the 1982 National Soccer League.)
2	St George-Budapest	30	14	8	8	47	40	+7	36	Qualification to Finals series
3	Wollongong City	30	16	3	11	43	46	−3	35	Qualification to Finals series
4	Heidelberg United	30	13	8	9	42	37	+5	34	Qualification to Finals series
5	Preston Makedonia	30	12	10	8	45	41	+4	34	
6	South Melbourne	30	11	9	10	46	37	+9	31	
7	APIA Leichhardt	30	12	7	11	49	54	−5	31	
8	Sydney Olympic	30	12	6	12	52	42	+10	30	
9	West Adelaide	30	10	8	12	44	40	+4	28	
10	Marconi Fairfield	30	12	4	14	44	43	+1	28	
11	Brisbane Lions	30	10	8	12	39	42	−3	28	
12	Newcastle KB United	30	10	7	13	43	52	−9	27	
13	Adelaide City	30	6	12	12	36	44	−8	24	
14	Footscray JUST	30	5	14	11	34	46	−12	24	
15	Canberra City	30	7	10	13	37	54	−17	24	
16	Brisbane City	30	5	11	14	32	55	−23	21	

Source: rsssf.com
Rules for classification: 1) points; 2) goal difference; 3) number of goals scored.
(C) Champions

==== Results summary ====
Overall								Home						Away					
Pld	W	D	L	GF	GA	GD	Pts	W	D	L	GF	GA	GD	W	D	L	GF	GA	GD
30	5	14	11	34	46	−12	29	2	9	4	19	20	−1	3	5	7	15	26	−11

Source: worldfootball.net

==== Results by round ====
Round	1	2	3	4	5	6	7	8	9	10	11	12	13	14	15	16	17	18	19	20	21	22	23	24	25	26	27	28	29	30
Ground	H	A	H	A	H	A	H	A	H	A	H	A	A	H	A	H	A	H	A	H	A	H	A	H	A	H	H	A	H	A
Result	D	D	D	L	L	L	D	L	D	W	W	L	D	W	D	D	D	D	W	L	L	L	W	L	D	D	D	L	D	L
Position	5	8	9	13	15	15	15	16	16	13	12	13	13	12	12	11	13	12	11	11	14	14	12	13	12	12	12	14	13	14
Points	1	2	3	3	3	3	4	4	5	7	9	9	10	12	13	14	15	16	18	18	18	18	20	20	21	22	23	23	24	24

Source: worldfootball.net
A = Away; H = Home; W = Win; D = Draw; L = Loss

==== Matches ====
Win Draw Loss

14 February 1982 1	Footscray JUST	2–2	St George-Budapest	Melbourne
	Cozzella 66'; Hazabent 70'	Report		Stadium: Schintler Reserve; Attendance: 535; Referee: Chris Bambridge

21 February 1982 2	Adelaide City	0–0	Footscray JUST	Adelaide
		Report		Stadium: Hindmarsh Stadium; Attendance: 2,800; Referee: Graham Neal

28 February 1982 3	Footscray JUST	1–1	Marconi Fairfield	Melbourne
	Ilioski 62'	Report	Hunter 75'	Stadium: Schintler Reserve; Attendance: 2,263; Referee: Dennis Voutsinas

7 March 1982 4	Brisbane Lions	7–1	Footscray JUST	Brisbane
	Hogg 3'; Low 4'; McLean 9'; Williamson 21' (pen.), 68'; Niven 56'; Daunt 62'	Report	Ilioski 90' (pen.)	Stadium: Richlands Stadium; Attendance: 1,221; Referee: Dave Nugent

14 March 1982 5	Footscray JUST	0–1	Preston Makedonia	Melbourne
		Report	Ward 70'	Stadium: Schintler Reserve; Attendance: 4,910; Referee: Chris Bambridge

21 March 1982 6	Wollongong City	2–1	Footscray JUST	Wollongong
	Cotton 9', 79'	Report	Simic 34'	Stadium: Wollongong Showground; Attendance: 3,200; Referee: Brian Fowler

28 March 1982 7	Footscray JUST	1–1	South Melbourne	Melbourne
	Cozzella 75'	Report	Egan 9'	Stadium: Schintler Reserve; Attendance: 5,000; Referee: Stewart Mellings

4 April 1982 8	Sydney City	1–0	Footscray JUST	Sydney
	Kosmina 85'	Report		Stadium: ES Marks Athletics Field; Attendance: 700; Referee: Tony Boskovic

11 April 1982 9	Footscray JUST	2–2	West Adelaide	Melbourne
	Kojic 55'; Ilioski 65'	Report	Honeyman 66'; Santrac 67'	Stadium: Schintler Reserve; Attendance: 2,000; Referee: David Yelland

18 April 1982 10	APIA Leichhardt	0–2	Footscray JUST	Sydney
		Report	Simic 72'; Kojic 84'	Stadium: Lambert Park; Attendance: 4,128; Referee: Ken Small

25 April 1982 11	Footscray JUST	2–0	Brisbane City	Melbourne
	Simic 48', 67'	Report		Stadium: Schintler Reserve; Attendance: 1,652; Referee: Jim Fearn

2 May 1982 12	Sydney Olympic	3–0	Footscray JUST	Sydney
	Koussas 11'; Redfern 80', 86'	Report		Stadium: Pratten Park; Attendance: 7,160; Referee: Ken Small

9 May 1982 13	Canberra City	2–2	Footscray JUST	Canberra
	Purdie 23'; T. Byrne 48'	Report	Lujic 29'; Ristovski 39'	Stadium: Bruce Stadium; Attendance: 2,500; Referee: Bob Mee

16 May 1982 14	Footscray JUST	3–1	Newcastle KB United	Melbourne
	Kojic 3', 85'; Ristovski 60'	Report	Mason 8'	Stadium: Schintler Reserve; Attendance: 2,000; Referee: Dennis Voutsinas

23 May 1982 15	Heidelberg United	3–3	Footscray JUST	Melbourne
	Campbell 45', 67'; Yzendoorn 85'	Report	Belic 34'; Ristovski 51'; Ilioski 56' (pen.)	Stadium: Olympic Village; Attendance: 4,000; Referee: Evan Venios

30 May 1982 16	Footscray JUST	2–2	Adelaide City	Melbourne
	Belic 13'; Kondarios 65'	Report	Rusell 41'; Melta 75'	Stadium: Schintler Reserve; Attendance: 2,500; Referee: Chris Bambridge

6 June 1982 17	St George-Budapest	1–1	Footscray JUST	Sydney
	Marton 51' (pen.)	Report	Kondarios 87'	Stadium: St George Stadium; Attendance: 2,963; Referee: Jim Reeves

13 June 1982 18	Footscray JUST	1–1	Brisbane Lions	Melbourne
	Ristovski 36'	Report	Wright 2'	Stadium: Schintler Reserve; Attendance: 2,000; Referee: Jim Fearn

20 June 1982 19	Marconi Fairfield	0–2	Footscray JUST	Sydney
		Report	Simic 8', 72'	Stadium: Marconi Stadium; Attendance: 2,322; Referee: Doug Rennie

27 June 1982 20	Footscray JUST	1–2	Wollongong City	Melbourne
	Ristovski 71'	Report	O'Connor 25'; Adam 59'	Stadium: Schintler Reserve; Attendance: 1,200; Referee: David Yelland

4 July 1982 21	South Melbourne	3–2	Footscray JUST	Melbourne
	Egan 5', 67'; Halford 90'	Report	Ristovski 26'; Simic 43'	Stadium: Middle Park Soccer Stadium; Attendance: 5,000; Referee: Chris Bambridge

11 July 1982 22	Footscray JUST	0–2	Sydney City	Melbourne
		Report	Borges 42', 46'	Stadium: Schintler Reserve; Attendance: 1,600; Referee: Evan Venios

18 July 1982 23	West Adelaide	0–1	Footscray JUST	Adelaide
		Report	Simic 47'	Stadium: Hindmarsh Stadium; Attendance: 3,000; Referee: Jim Rossis

25 July 1982 24	Footscray JUST	0–1	APIA Leichhardt	Melbourne
		Report	Jones 55'	Stadium: Schintler Reserve; Attendance: 1,500; Referee: Jim Fearn

1 August 1982 25	Brisbane City	0–0	Footscray JUST	Brisbane
		Report		Stadium: Spencer Park; Attendance: 1,200; Referee: Gary Power

8 August 1982 26	Footscray JUST	1–1	Sydney Olympic	Melbourne
	Lujic 36'	Report	Koussas 68'	Stadium: Schintler Reserve; Attendance: 3,195; Referee: Stewart Mellings

15 August 1982 27	Footscray JUST	2–2	Canberra City	Melbourne
	Kojic 1'; Kyriakouleas 71'	Report	G. Byrne 25'; Brennan 43'	Stadium: Schintler Reserve; Attendance: 2,000; Referee: Dennis Voutsinas

21 August 1982 28	Newcastle KB United	1–0	Footscray JUST	Newcastle
	Drysdale 40'	Report		Stadium: Newcastle International Sports Centre; Attendance: 3,864; Referee: Tim Davies

29 August 1982 29	Footscray JUST	1–1	Heidelberg United	Melbourne
	Kondarios 75'	Report	Valentine 10'	Stadium: Schintler Reserve; Attendance: 3,000; Referee: Chris Bambridge

5 September 1982 30	Preston Makedonia	3–0	Footscray JUST	Melbourne
	Brown 10'; McMillan 28', 52'	Report		Stadium: B.T. Connor Reserve; Attendance: 5,000; Referee: Stewart Mellings

=== NSL Cup ===
14 June 1982 First round	Preston Makedonia	2–0	Footscray JUST	Melbourne
	Opasinis 5'; Ward 23'	Report		Stadium: B.T. Connor Reserve; Attendance: 2,500; Referee: Stewart Mellings

== Statistics ==
=== Appearances and goals ===
Includes all competitions. Players with no appearances not included in the list.

No.	Pos	Nat	Player	Total		National Soccer League		NSL Cup	
No.	Pos	Nat	Player	Apps	Goals	Apps	Goals	Apps	Goals
	MF	(Australia) AUS	Vlatko Belic	12	2	11	2	1	0
	GK	(Scotland) SCO	Dennis Boland	14	0	13	0	1	0
		(Australia) AUS	Milutin Ciric	17	0	17	0	0	0
	FW	(Australia) AUS	Bruno Cozzella	8	2	8	2	0	0
	MF	(Australia) AUS	Suleiman Curovic	19	0	13+5	0	1	0
		(Australia) AUS	Jusuf Hatunic	4	0	4	0	0	0
	DF	(Socialist Federal Republic of Yugoslavia) YUG	Igor Hazabent	30	1	30	1	0	0
	MF	(Australia) AUS	Zoran Ilioski	28	4	27	4	1	0
	DF	(Socialist Federal Republic of Yugoslavia) YUG	Slobodan Jovanovic	18	0	15+2	0	0+1	0
	DF	(Socialist Federal Republic of Yugoslavia) YUG	Milan Kojic	21	5	20+1	5	0	0
	DF	(Greece) GRE	Jim Kondarios	29	4	27+1	4	1	0
		(Australia) AUS	Mike Kupinic	1	0	1	0	0	0
	DF	(Australia) AUS	Kyri Kyriakouleas	20	0	19	0	1	0
	MF	(Socialist Federal Republic of Yugoslavia) YUG	Zdravko Lujic	23	2	23	2	0	0
	DF	(Australia) AUS	Jim Milne	24	0	22+2	0	0	0
	DF	(Scotland) SCO	Jim O'Reilly	30	0	28+1	0	1	0
		(Australia) AUS	Slobodan Popovic	1	0	0	0	1	0
		(Australia) AUS	Vlado Pljevaljcic	10	0	10	0	0	0
	FW	(Australia) AUS	Mendo Ristovski	20	6	16+3	6	1	0
	FW	(Australia) AUS	Paul Simic	19	8	16+2	8	1	0
	DF	(Australia) AUS	Slobodan Stojcevski	11	0	7+4	0	0	0
	FW	(Socialist Federal Republic of Yugoslavia) YUG	Dragan Vasic	8	0	3+4	0	1	0

=== Disciplinary record ===
Includes all competitions. The list is sorted by squad number when total cards are equal. Players with no cards not included in the list.

No.	Pos	Nat	Player	Total			National Soccer League			NSL Cup		
No.	Pos	Nat	Player	Yellow card	Second yellow card	Red card	Yellow card	Second yellow card	Red card	Yellow card	Second yellow card	Red card
	DF	(Australia) AUS	Jim Milne	4	0	1	4	0	1	0	0	0
	DF	(Socialist Federal Republic of Yugoslavia) YUG	Slobodan Jovanovic	3	0	1	3	0	1	0	0	0
	DF	(Australia) AUS	Kyri Kyriakouleas	3	0	1	3	0	1	0	0	0
	DF	(Socialist Federal Republic of Yugoslavia) YUG	Igor Hazabent	5	0	0	5	0	0	0	0	0
	DF	(Scotland) SCO	Jim O'Reilly	2	0	0	2	0	0	0	0	0
	MF	(Australia) AUS	Vlatko Belic	1	0	0	1	0	0	0	0	0
	MF	(Australia) AUS	Suleiman Curovic	1	0	0	1	0	0	0	0	0
	DF	(Greece) GRE	Jim Kondarios	1	0	0	1	0	0	0	0	0
		(Australia) AUS	Vlado Pljevaljcic	1	0	0	1	0	0	0	0	0
	FW	(Australia) AUS	Mendo Ristovski	1	0	0	1	0	0	0	0	0
	FW	(Australia) AUS	Paul Simic	1	0	0	1	0	0	0	0	0
	FW	(Socialist Federal Republic of Yugoslavia) YUG	Dragan Vasic	1	0	0	1	0	0	0	0	0

- (yellow card) = Number of bookings; (second yellow card) = Number of sending offs after a second yellow card; (red card) = Number of sending offs by a direct red card.
