= 1983 NSL Cup =

National Soccer League Cup

Tournament details
- Country: Australia
- Dates: 5 March – 13 November 1983
- Teams: 16

Final positions
- Champions: Sydney Olympic (1st title)
- Runners-up: Heidelberg United

Tournament statistics
- Matches played: 15
- Goals scored: 60 (4 per match)
- Attendance: 61,413 (4,094 per match)

The 1983 NSL Cup was the seventh edition of the NSL Cup, which was the main national association football knockout cup competition in Australia. The competition was known as the Philips Cup under a sponsorship arrangement with Dutch company Philips.

APIA Leichhardt were the defending champions, having defeated Heidelberg United to win their first title in the previous year's final, but they were eliminated in the final by Sydney Olympic.

Sydney Olympic defeated Heidelberg United 2–0 on aggregate in the final to win their first NSL Cup title.

== Teams ==
The NSL Cup was a knockout competition with 16 teams taking part all trying to reach the Final in November 1983. The competition consisted of the 16 teams from the National Soccer League.

Round	Main date	Number of fixtures	Clubs remaining
First round	Sunday 6 March 1983	8	16 → 8
Quarter-finals	Monday 4 April 1983	4	8 → 4
Semi-finals	Sunday 30 October 1983	2	4 → 2
Final	Sunday 13 November 1983	2	2 → 1

== First round ==
5 March 1983	Newcastle KB United	2–0	APIA Leichhardt	Newcastle
15:00 AEDT	Mason 35'; Lowe 73'	Report		Stadium: Newcastle International Sports Centre; Attendance: 1,600; Referee: Jim Reeves

6 March 1983	Brisbane City	4–2	Brisbane Lions	Brisbane
15:00 AEST	Cairney 60'; Tokesi 73'; Williamson 82'; Glockner 90'	Report	Kelso 34', 47'	Stadium: Perry Park; Attendance: 1,400; Referee: Bill Monteverde

6 March 1983	Canberra City	2–1	Wollongong Wolves	Queanbeyan
19:00 AEDT	Redmond 5'; Gibson 34'	Report	Cotton 43'	Stadium: Seiffert Oval; Attendance: 1,200; Referee: Bob Mee

6 March 1983	Footscray JUST	2–3	Heidelberg United	Melbourne
15:00 AEDT	Kondarios 14'; MacLeod 84'	Report	Valentine 20', 70'; Lea 81'	Stadium: Schintler Reserve; Attendance: 3,000; Referee: Evan Venios

6 March 1983	Marconi Fairfield	3–2	Sydney City	Sydney
15:00 AEDT	Jankovics 27'; Carbone 28'; Brown 33'	Report	Mitchell 78'; Barnes 84'	Stadium: Marconi Stadium; Attendance: 2,958; Referee: Richard Lorenc

6 March 1983	South Melbourne	4–0	Preston Makedonia	Melbourne
15:00 AEDT	Blair 13'; Brown 35', 36'; Halford 62'	Report		Stadium: Middle Park Soccer Stadium; Attendance: 5,000; Referee: Jim Fearn

6 March 1983	West Adelaide	1–0	Adelaide City	Adelaide
14:30 ACDT	Wormley 61'	Report		Stadium: Hindmarsh Stadium; Attendance: 3,169; Referee: Jim Rossis

6 March 1983	St George-Budapest	0–3	Sydney Olympic	Sydney
15:00 AEDT		Report	Soper 49'; Patikas 51', 80'	Stadium: St George Stadium; Attendance: 4,265; Referee: Ken Small

== Quarter-finals ==
4 April 1983	South Melbourne	6–2	Canberra City	Melbourne
	Halford 1'; Brown 22'; Crino 54', 57'; Blair 62'; Egan 74'	Report	Brennan 65'; Bryant 90'	Stadium: Middle Park Soccer Stadium; Attendance: 1,000; Referee: Chris Bambridge

4 April 1983	Sydney Olympic	3–1	Newcastle KB United	Sydney
	Koussas 62'; Paterson 70'; Raskopoulos 86' (pen.)	Report	Lowe 38'	Stadium: Pratten Park; Attendance: 2,500; Referee: Gary Power

4 April 1983	West Adelaide	0–4	Heidelberg United	Adelaide
		Report	Campbell 36', 37', 73'; Selemidis 58'	Stadium: Hindmarsh Stadium; Attendance: 2,150; Referee: Tony Martell

15 April 1983	Marconi Fairfield	3–2	Brisbane City	Sydney
	Sermanni 46'; Djordjevic 62'; Jankovics 83'	Report	Perry 12'; Wilkinson 87'	Stadium: Marconi Stadium; Attendance: 2,251; Referee: Doug Rennie

== Semi-finals ==
30 October 1983	Sydney Olympic	2–1	Marconi Fairfield	Sydney
	Koussas 15'; Patikas 21'	Report	McCulloch 40'	Stadium: St George Stadium; Attendance: 3,500; Referee: Jim Reeves

30 October 1983	Heidelberg United	3–2	South Melbourne	Melbourne
	Cole 35', 53'; Lea 39'	Report	Yzendoorn 88' (pen.), 89'	Stadium: Olympic Park; Attendance: 15,000; Referee: Don Campbell

== Final ==
6 November 1983

Sydney Olympic	1–0	Heidelberg United
Patalis 64'	Report

St George Stadium, Sydney
Attendance: 6,420
Referee: Tony Boskovic
13 November 1983

Heidelberg United	0–1	Sydney Olympic
	Report	Patalis 82'

Olympic Park, Melbourne
Attendance: 6,000
Referee: Chris Bambridge
