= Michael Coady =

Michael Coady may refer to:

- Michael Coady (poet) (1939–2024), Irish poet and short story writer
- Michael Coady (rugby) (born 1987), English rugby footballer

== See also ==
- Mick Coady (born 1958), English footballer (full name Michael Liam Coady)
