= David Cork (footballer, born 1959) =

English footballer

Personal information
- Date of birth: 8 October 1959 (age 67)
- Place of birth: Doncaster, England
- Height: 1.68 m (5 ft 6 in)
- Position: Midfielder

Youth career
- 1975–1978: Manchester United

Senior career*
| Years | Team | Apps | (Gls) |
| 1978–1980 | Doncaster Rovers | 9 | (1) |
| 1981 | Sydney Olympic | 5 | (0) |
- * Club domestic league appearances and goals

David Cork (born 8 October 1959) is an English former footballer who played as a midfielder for Doncaster Rovers and Sydney Olympic in the late 1970s and 1980s.

Born in Doncaster, Cork began his football career as a 15-year-old with Manchester United. He started out in the club's Junior B team, and earned himself a professional contract when he turned 17 in October 1976. However, despite becoming a regular in the club's Junior A team in 1977–78, Cork was unable to break into the reserves or the first team and he was allowed to join his hometown club, Doncaster Rovers, in May 1978. He made just nine league appearances for the Doncaster first team in two years at Belle Vue, scoring one goal. In 1980, he moved to Australia to play for Sydney Olympic.
