= Milan Blagojevic (soccer) =

Australian retired soccer player

Personal information
- Date of birth: 24 December 1969 (age 56)
- Height: 1.83 m (6 ft 0 in)
- Position: Defender

Youth career
- Avala Sports Club

Senior career*
Years	Team	Apps	(Gls)
1986–1989	Avala Sports Club		
1989–1991	APIA Leichhardt	37	(0)
1991–1992	Marconi Stallions	26	(0)
1992–1993	Germinal Ekeren	13	(0)
1993–1996	SC Heerenveen	1	(0)
1994–1995	→ Heidelberg United (loan)	8	(0)
1995–1996	→ Sydney Olympic (loan)	27	(0)
1996–1997	Sydney Olympic	18	(0)
1998	Johor FC		
1998–1999	Sydney Olympic	17	(0)
1999–2001	Parramatta Power	43	(3)
2001–2004	Newcastle United	57	(1)
2004	Geylang United	2	

International career^{‡}
1989	Australia U-20		
1992	Australia U-23		
1991–2002	Australia	19	(0)

Managerial career
- 2005: Bonnyrigg White Eagles
- 2006: Blacktown City Demons
- 2007: Blacktown City Demons (Assistant)
- 2008–2009: Sydney Olympic
Medal record
Representing Australia
Men's Association football
OFC Nations Cup
Winner	1996
Runner-up	2002
- * Club domestic league appearances and goals as of 24 May 2007 ‡ National team caps and goals as of 15 May 2007

Milan Blagojevic (born 24 December 1969) is an Australian former soccer player and coach. As a player, he appeared for clubs in Australia, Belgium, The Netherlands, Malaysia and Singapore. At national team level, he represented Australia at youth and full international level. As a teenager, he played futsal, representing White Eagles in the Australian National Indoor Soccer League.

== Early life ==
Blagojevic is of Serbian descent and always aspired to be a professional footballer. He attended Cabramatta High School in the 1980s. He played futsal and outdoor football as a teenager.

== Club career ==
Blagojevic played with Serbian-Australian club Avala (now Bonnyrigg White Eagles) in the New South Wales State League and in the National Indoor Soccer League (NISL). He moved to APIA Leichhardt in 1989 on a A$13,500 transfer. He continued to play for White Eagles in the NISL after joining APIA.

At APIA Leichhardt, Blagojevic spent three seasons, playing 37 times in the National Soccer League (NSL).

In 1991 he moved to Marconi Stallions, where he featured in 26 league matches during the 1991–92 NSL season.

Blagojevic moved to Belgium in 1992 with Germinal Ekeren on a A$300,000 transfer deal. He played 13 league games in the 1992–93 season before leaving early in March 1993.

In 1993, he moved to SC Heerenveen on a A$225,000 transfer deal. Blagojevic made one league appearance. Returning from a knee injury, he was given the choice of returning to the first team via the reserves but chose to go on loan back in Australia.

Ahead of the 1994–95 season, Blagojevic joined Heidelberg United on a A$7,500 one-year loan deal. He played eight times for Heidelberg before a knee injury led to a knee reconstruction.

In 1995 Blagojevic moved to Sydney Olympic, initially on a one-season loan from SC Heerenveen.

In early 1998 he joined Johor FC on a two-year deal with a A$40,000 transfer fee. He was released in December 1998.

Blagojevic rejoined Sydney Olympic later that year, making a further 17 league appearances through 1999.

He then spent two seasons with Parramatta Power from 1999 to 2001, recording 43 league appearances and three goals.

Blagojevic finished his NSL career at Newcastle United between 2001 and 2004, playing 57 league matches and scoring once.

In January 2004, Blagojevic signed for Singaporean team Geylang United where he played twice before being released in May 2004.

== International career ==
In the 1992 Olympic Games he was part of the Australia squad, playing in every game en route to a single goal loss to Ghana in the bronze medal playoff.

== Coaching career ==
After retiring from playing, Blagojevic moved into coaching at Bonnyrigg White Eagles before taking up a position with the Blacktown City Demons for the 2005–2006 New South Wales Premier League season.

Blagojevic is currently the manager at Sydney Olympic Football Club, after taking over from Manny Spanoudakis, who was appointed as the club's technical director. During the 2008 season, Blagojevic lead Sydney Olympic to success in the Johnny Warren Cup and lead them to the final of the Tiger Turf Cup.

In 2006, he was an assistant coach on the first series of the Australian television series Nerds FC.

== Honours ==
Australia

- OFC Nations Cup: 1996,; runner-up 2002
