= Bruce Stowell =

English football player and manager (born 1941)

Personal information
- Date of birth: 20 September 1941 (age 85)
- Place of birth: Bradford, England
- Position: Midfielder

Youth career
- 1957–1958: Leeds United
- 1958–1959: Bradford City

Senior career*
Years	Team	Apps	(Gls)
1959–1972	Bradford City	401	(16)
1972–1973	Rotherham United	16	(0)
1975–1976	Pan Hellenic		
1980	Blacktown City		
Total		417	(16)

Managerial career
- 1977: Sydney Olympic
- 1982–1983: Queensland State
- 1991–1993: Newcastle Breakers
- 1994–1996: Brisbane Strikers
- 1999–2000: Johor
- 2002–2007: Queensland Academy of Sport
- 2007–2008: Tasmanian Institute of Sport
- * Club domestic league appearances and goals

Bruce Stowell (born 20 September 1941) is an English former football player and manager.

== Playing career ==
Born in Bradford, Stowell began his career with Leeds United, before signing amateur forms with Bradford City in May 1958. He became a part-time professional in December 1958, and became fully professional in June 1967. Upon turning professional, Stowell became club captain at City. In October 1970, Stowell played in his 344th Football League game for City, breaking George Robinson's 55-year-old appearance record. Stowell made a total of 401 appearances for City in the Football League, and 437 games for them across all competitions.

Stowell also played for Rotherham United, making 16 appearances in the Football League for them, before moving to Australia, where he played for Pan Hellenic and Blacktown City.

== Coaching career ==
After retiring as a player, Stowell coached Sydney Olympic, spent almost 10 years as Queensland state director of coaching, Newcastle Breakers and Brisbane Strikers.

He also coached in Malaysia, and was the head coach for Johor from 1999 to the end of 2000 season.

Stowell later returned to Queensland, becoming head football coach of the Queensland Academy of Sport.

He remained there until 2007, when he joined the Tasmanian Institute of Sport. His tenure there finished a year later.
