= Mick Coady =

English footballer

Michael Coady
Personal information
- Full name: Michael Liam Coady
- Date of birth: 1 October 1958 (age 68)
- Place of birth: Dipton, England
- Position: Defender

Youth career
- Sunderland

Senior career*
Years	Team	Apps	(Gls)
1976-1980	Sunderland	7	(0)
1980-1982	Carlisle United	51	(1)
1983-1984	Sydney Olympic		
1984-1986	Wolverhampton Wanderers	15	(1)
1987	Barrow		
- * Club domestic league appearances and goals

Michael Liam Coady (born 1 October 1958 in Dipton, County Durham) is an English former professional footballer, who played for Sunderland AFC, Carlisle United, Sydney Olympic, Wolverhampton Wanderers and Barrow FC.
