= Manfred Schaefer =

Australian soccer player (1943–2023)

Personal information
- Date of birth: 12 February 1943
- Place of birth: Pillau, East Prussia, Germany
- Date of death: 28 March 2023 (aged 80)
- Position: Defender

Senior career*
Years	Team	Apps	(Gls)
1960–1963	Blacktown		
1963–1975	St. George-Budapest		

International career
1967–1974	Australia	49	(1)

Managerial career
- 1975–1977: St. George-Budapest
- 1982–1986: Sydney Olympic FC
- 1988: Brunswick Juventus
- 1989–1991: APIA Leichhardt
- 1992–1994: Sydney United
- 1995: Leichhardt Tigers
- 1995–1997: Marconi Stallions
- 1998–1999: Adelaide Sharks
- 2002–2004: Parramatta Power (assistant manager)
- * Club domestic league appearances and goals

Manfred Schaefer (12 February 1943 – 28 March 2023) was a German soccer player who played as a defender. At club level he won titles with St. George Budapest. Born in Germany, he represented the Australian national team internationally, participating in the 1974 World Cup in Germany. As coach he was several times runner-up in the Australian National Soccer League with various clubs.

== Early life ==
Schaefer was born in the East Prussian town of Pillau, Germany (now Baltiysk, Russia), near Königsberg (now Kaliningrad). In the dying days of World War II his family fled westward to Bremen. In 1954 the family emigrated with Manfred, by then aged 11, to Australia. Schaefer was a milkman, a job that required him to deliver fresh milk to households in the suburbs every morning, and to which his extraordinary physical fitness was often attributed.

== Playing career ==
Schaefer started his football career in 1960 with Blacktown in west Sydney, playing in the second division of New South Wales. In 1963 he joined first division Budapest Club, which was renamed St. George-Budapest SC by 1965. There he played until 1975 alongside other great Australian football stars of the era, such as Attila Abonyi and Johnny Warren, winning the state championship in 1967, 1971, 1974 and 1975, the highest possible achievement in Australian football at the time in the absence of a national competition. He won the state cup, then known as the Ampol Cup, in 1967, 1972 and 1975; and in 1964 and 1972, the Federation Cup of New South Wales. The titles of 1975 he won as player-coach.

Schaefer's debut for the national side occurred on 5 November 1967, in a 5–3 victory over New Zealand, during the Vietnam National Day Tournament in Saigon (now Ho Chi Minh City). He played 73 times in the colours of Australia, 49 times in official international matches in which he scored one goal. His last three matches for Australia were 1974 World Cup, against East Germany, West Germany and Chile. He also represented New South Wales in interstate matches.

== Coaching career ==
In 1975, Schaefer began his coaching career at St. George-Budapest, where he remained until 1977. He then coached Sydney Olympic in the national championship from 1982 to 1986, where he was twice runner-up; Brunswick Juventus in the state league of Victoria in 1988; APIA Leichhardt from 1989 to 1991; Sydney United from 1992 to 1994; Leichhardt Tigers in 1995; Marconi Fairfield from 1995 until 1997, leading the team into the grand final of the national championship against the Melbourne Knights FC, where they lost 2–1; Adelaide Sharks from 1998 to 1999; and Parramatta Power from 2002 to 2004, where he served as assistant coach, and was runner-up in the national championship of 2004.

== Legacy ==
In 1999 Schaefer was an inaugural inductee into the Australian Soccer Hall of Fame. He was invited to the draw for the preliminary qualifying matches for the 2006 FIFA World Cup.

Schaefer Terrace in the Sydney suburb of Glenwood is named after him. His daughter Kim Schaefer played a couple of non-A international matches for the Australia women's national soccer team.

== Death ==
On 28 March 2023, it was reported that Schaefer had died at the age of 80.
