= Martyn Rogers (footballer, born 1960) =

English footballer

Martyn Rogers (26 January 1960 – 29 February 1992) was an English footballer. His regular position was at full back. He was born in Nottingham.

== Football career ==
He made just one senior appearance for Manchester United in a 0–4 defeat at West Bromwich Albion on 22 October 1977 at the age of 17. In the summer of 1979 he was transferred to Queens Park Rangers for a fee of £7,500.

His career at QPR was equally short, making just two appearances in the last two games of the 1979–80 season which were both won. He was given a free transfer to Australian side Sydney Olympic in May 1981.

In a 5-year stay in Sydney, Rogers helped the club win the Australian NSL Cup twice, in 1983 and 1985.

== Death ==
On 29 February 1992, Rogers made two phone calls: one to his mother, whom he told he was in Singapore, and one to a female friend of his, whom he told he was in Australia. Later that same day, he was found dead in his car at Ringwood, Hampshire, after feeding the exhaust fumes through the window.
