= Tony Spyridakos =

Australian soccer player (born 1964)

Personal information
- Date of birth: April 9, 1964
- Position: Midfielder

Senior career*
Years	Team	Apps	(Gls)
1982–1991	Sydney Olympic	158	(6)
1991–1992	Pierikos	21	(0)
1992–1995	Sydney Olympic	52	(0)

International career
1990	Australia	2	(0)
- * Club domestic league appearances and goals

Tony Spyridakos (Note: Variously known as Anthony Spyridakos, Anthony Dakos and Tony Dakos during his career) (born 9 April 1964) is an Australian former soccer player who played as a midfielder, primarily in the National Soccer League (NSL) for Sydney Olympic but also for Pierikos in Greece. Spyridakos played two times for the Australia men's national soccer team.

== Club career ==
Spyridakos played in Australia for Sydney Olympic FC in the National Soccer League (NSL) from 1982.

In July 1991, Spyridakos joined Pierikos on a A$55,000 transfer. He played 21 times during the 1991–92 Greek season.

In 1992, Spyridakos returned to Sydney Olympic, continuing in the NSL until 1995.

== International career ==
Spyridakos represented Australia at the 1983 FIFA World Youth Championship.

Spyridakos made his full international debut for Australia in August 1990 in a match against Indonesia in Jakarta. He played his second and final international against South Korea in Seoul in September 1990.
