= Gary Phillips (Australian soccer) =

Australian soccer player and coach

Personal information
- Full name: Gary Michael Phillips
- Date of birth: 9 June 1963 (age 63)
- Place of birth: Australia
- Position: Midfielder

Team information
- Current team: Bhutan; Bhutan U20 (head coach)

Youth career
- Coffs Harbour

Senior career*
Years	Team	Apps	(Gls)
1982–1993	Sydney Olympic	274	(17)
1993–1997	Brisbane Strikers	98	(2)

International career
1979–1981	Australian Schoolboys		

Managerial career
- 1999–2001: QAS
- 2001: Tonga
- 2001–2003: Sydney Olympic
- 2004: Da Nang
- 2008–2009: Newcastle Jets Women
- 2009–2011: Sabah
- 2014–2015: Papua New Guinea Women
- 2015–2016: Negeri Sembilan
- 2017: Davao Aguilas
- 2021: Nepal Women
- 2022–2023: Cook Islands Women
- 2026–: Bhutan
- 2026–: Bhutan U20
- * Club domestic league appearances and goals

Gary Phillips (born 9 June 1963) is an Australian professional soccer coach and former player who is head coach of the Bhutan national team and national under-20 team.

== Playing career ==
A central midfielder, Phillips played for more than a decade with Sydney Olympic in the National Soccer League before joining Brisbane Strikers, winning titles with both clubs. He retired after the 1996–97 season.

== Coaching career ==
As a coach, Phillips was in charge of Sydney Olympic in the 2001–02 and 2002–03 seasons, winning the title in 2001–02, before he was extraordinarily dismissed the following season.

Phillips was the inaugural coach of Newcastle Jets during the 2008–09 W-League season.

After working in a coaching capacity for the Asian Football Confederation in Kuala Lumpur, Phillips took over as head coach and technical director of Malaysia Premier League side Sabah in December 2009 and guided the team to Super League promotion in seven months. After a tough start to life in the Super League as the team was rocked by injury and forced to play eight of their first 12 matches on the road, Phillips was dismissed on 5 May 2011, replaced by former Sabah player and coach of Sabah's Piala Presiden team Justin Ganai.

In February 2015, he took over as manager of the Papua New Guinea women's national team.

Shortly following the conclusion of the 2015 Malaysia Premier League season, Phillips returned to Malaysia and signed a contract with Negeri Sembilan Matrix. Some of his first signings were all former A-League players.

He coached the Davao Aguilas during the 2017 Philippines Football League season until he was replaced midseason in September 2017 by Marlon Maro.

In July 2019, Phillips was appointed technical director for the Nepal national team. He was signed on a one-year contract.

Phillips was appointed coach of the Nepal women's national team in February, 2021.

In May, 2022, he was appointed coach of the Cook Islands national women's team.

== Media career ==
Phillips is an occasional pundit on Malaysian television network Astro and its twice weekly FourFourTwo TV Show, and also Fox Sports in Australia.
