= Graham Jennings =

Australian footballer (born 1960)

Personal information
- Full name: Graham Jennings
- Date of birth: 18 January 1960 (age 66)
- Place of birth: Newcastle, Australia
- Position: Defender

Youth career
- 1967–1972: Hamilton Azzuri
- 1973–1975: Adamstown Rosebud

Senior career*
Years	Team	Apps	(Gls)
1976–1978	Adamstown Rosebud		
1979–1985	Sydney Olympic	166	(11)
1986–1989	Sydney Croatia	89	(1)
1989–1992	A.P.I.A. Leichhardt	74	(1)
1993–1994	Newcastle Breakers	25	(1)
1993–1994	Adamstown Rosebud	38	(4)

International career^{‡}
1978–1979	Australia U-20		
1983–1989	Australia	44	(0)
- * Club domestic league appearances and goals as of 17:30, 12 August 2010 (UTC) ‡ National team caps and goals as of 17:30, 12 August 2010 (UTC)

Graham Jennings (born 18 January 1960) is a former Australian association footballer, who played predominantly as a defender and was renowned for his speed, earning him the nickname flash. After a distinguished club and international career spanning twenty years, Jennings was inducted into the Australian Football Hall of Fame in 1999, receiving the Award of Distinction. Graham is married to wife Louise, and has three children.

== Club career ==
A native of Newcastle, Jennings began playing football at the age of seven with local team Hamilton Azzurri. As a teenager, he moved to one of the region's biggest clubs in Adamstown Rosebud, and eventually made his senior debut at the age of 16. In 1978, he earned his first representative cap with Northern New South Wales, and after impressive displays for the Australian youth team later that year, he joined Sydney Olympic in the National Soccer League .

=== Sydney Olympic ===
Playing initially as an attacking winger, Jennings' first season with Olympic witnessed relegation from the NSL, but he played a key role in helping the club achieve promotion in 1980. The arrival of Manfred Schaefer to Pratten Park resulted in a move to left-back, a position he would make his own for the remainder of his career. After consecutive finals appearances with Olympic in 1984 (losing in the Grand Final to South Melbourne) and 1985, Jennings transferred to rivals Sydney Croatia.

=== Sydney Croatia ===
Jennings tasted success immediately with Croatia, helping them claim the Minor Premiership in the Northern Conference in 1986. He played in all but two games for the club in 1988, as Croatia stormed their way into the Grand Final only to lose to Marconi-Fairfield in a penalty-shootout. After a disappointing season the following year, he moved to A.P.I.A. Leichhardt.

=== A.P.I.A. and Newcastle ===
Jennings was an ever present in the A.P.I.A squad, but once the club was demoted from the NSL, he returned to his hometown, firstly with Adamstown Rosebud and then with the Newcastle Breakers in 1993–94, where he played in every game but one in what proved to be his final season at national club level. He returned to Adamstown Rosebud for the remainder of the 1994 New South Wales Super League season, retiring from football upon its conclusion.

== International career ==
His impressive club form with Adamstown Rosebud earned selection in Australia's inaugural youth team in 1978, where he played in the Oceania World Youth Cup qualifiers. In 1983, he made his debut for the senior national team, playing against England in a friendly at the Sydney Cricket Ground. This began a long career with the Socceroos, where Jennings became a stalwart in successive World Cup campaigns, and an Olympian in 1988, in what proved to be the final open age football tournament in Seoul. In all, Jennings played 84 times for his country, 44 of which were full 'A' internationals.

== Honours ==
With Australia:

- Trans-Tasman Cup: 1986, 1988. 1987 (runners-up)
- President's Cup: 1987 (runners-up)
- Bicentennial Gold Cup: 1988 (runners-up)
- Merlion Cup: 1983

With Sydney Olympic:

- NSL Championship: 1984 (runners-up)
- NSL Cup: 1983, 1985

With Sydney Croatia:

- NSL Championship: 1988 (runners-up)
- NSL Cup: 1987

Personal honours:

- FFA Hall of Fame Inductee - 1999
