= Peter Katholos =

Australian soccer player (born 1961)

Personal information
- Full name: Peter Katholos
- Date of birth: 18 March 1961 (age 65)
- Place of birth: Myrsini, Elis, Greece
- Position: Midfielder

Senior career*
Years	Team	Apps	(Gls)
1979–1980	St George	35	(5)
1981–1985	Sydney Olympic	131	(33)
1985–1986	AEL	3	(0)
1986	Sydney Olympic	10	(0)
1987	APIA Leichhardt	20	(3)
1988–1991	Marconi	92	(5)
1991–1993	Sydney Olympic	29	(2)
1993–1994	Parramatta Eagles	11	(1)

International career^{‡}
1981–1983	Australia	14	(2)
- * Club domestic league appearances and goals as of 02:55, 13 September 2022 (UTC) ‡ National team caps and goals as of 02:55, 13 September 2022 (UTC)

Peter Katholos (Greek: Παναγιώτης Καθόλος; born 18 March 1961) is an Australian former soccer player. He was a member of the Socceroos, Australia's national soccer team, throughout the 1980s during which time he made 22 international appearances (14 ' A-matches'), scoring two goals. He is best known for his time as a midfielder with Sydney Olympic and later Marconi in the Australian National Soccer League, although he also played for the Greek team AEL at one stage.

Katholos emigrated from Greece to Australia with his parents as a nine-year-old.

== Playing career ==
=== Club career ===
Katholos played for St George 35 times during the 1979 and 1980 National Soccer League seasons.

Katholos transferred from St George to the Sydney Olympians (as Sydney Olympic were branded in 1981), where he played under Scottish coach Tommy Docherty.

In 1985, Katholos signed a three-year contract to play in Greece for AEL. He returned to Australia in mid-1986, having only played three times in the league, each time as a substitute.

After a disagreement with coach Peter Raskopoulos, Katholos transferred from Olympic to Parramatta Eagles part way through the 1992–93 National Soccer League season.

He was nicknamed "The Kat" by Sydney Olympic supporters.

=== International career ===
Katholos made his national team debut for Australia against Indonesia in Melbourne in May 1981. He played the last of his 14 full international appearances in December 1983 against Singapore.

== Honours ==
=== Player ===
Sydney Olympic

- NSL Cup: 1983, 1985

APIA Leichhardt

- National Soccer League Championship: 1987

Marconi-Fairfield

- National Soccer League Championship: 1988, 1989

Individual

- National Soccer League Player of the Year: 1982
