= Danny Moulis =

Australian soccer player (born 1960)

Personal information
- Full name: Daniel Moulis
- Date of birth: 25 July 1960 (age 66)
- Position: Defender

Senior career*
Years	Team	Apps	(Gls)
1977–1980	Canberra City	93	(4)
1981–1982	Sydney Olympic	28	(1)
1983–1984	Canberra City Arrows	0	(0)
Total		121	(5)

International career
1980	Australia	4	(3)
- * Club domestic league appearances and goals

Daniel Moulis (born 25 July 1960) is an Australian former soccer player who played as a defender.

== Club career ==
Moulis played for Canberra North SC as a junior. He then graduated directly from U-16s into the Canberra City team that competed in the inaugural Philips Soccer League season (Australia's first national football league) in 1977. His coach at that time was Australian soccer identity Johnny Warren. He became the one of the first players to play 100 games for a PSL club in a Canberra City match against South Melbourne Hellas SC in 1980, having played 86 league matches, 11 NSL Cup games and 3 Prime Minister Cup fixtures.

Moulis was transferred to Sydney Olympic, also in the National Soccer League, at the commencement of the 1981 season. At Sydney Olympic his Head Coach was the mercurial Tommy Docherty. In the first game of the 1982 season, in a match against Newcastle KB United at the International Sports Centre, Moulis suffered an anterior cruciate ligament injury, signalling the end of his professional football career.

After a full knee reconstruction and partial recovery, Moulis played senior amateur football with Canberra City, Australian National University, and Woden Valley SC.

== International career ==
In 1978 Moulis was vice-captain of the Australian Schoolboys national team on its North American west coast tour (Vancouver, Seattle, San Francisco, and Los Angeles).

Later in the same year he was a member of the Australia Youth team which beat the New Zealand Youth team in the OFC U-20 Championship to qualify for the South American playoff for the 1979 World Youth Cup in Tokyo. The Australia Youth team failed to qualify in the playoff, falling to Paraguay and drawing with Israel in matches played in the Paraguayan capital, Asuncion.

In December 1978 Moulis played for a Philips Soccer League XI representative team, selected by well-known Australian coach Rale Rasic, against the travelling Greek outfit Olympiakos at the Sydney Sports Ground.

In 1980 Moulis became Socceroo #297, with his first cap coming against Papua New Guinea in the 1980 OFC Nations Cup. He played four international matches for the Australia national team in that tournament, scoring three goals.

Moulis was a member of both the Canberra City Masters team that won Silver at the 2002 Melbourne World Masters Games (Mens Premier 40+), and the OldaRoos team that won Silver at the 2009 Sydney World Masters Games (also Mens Premier 40+).

== After soccer ==
In parallel with his career devotion to soccer football, Moulis became a lawyer, arbitrator, sports administrator, and company director.

His sports administration and directorship roles have included:

- Company Secretary, The Sixth Australian Masters Games (1995–1998)
- Chairman, Canberra Cosmos FC (2000–2001)
- Member, Disciplinary and Appeals Committee, Football Federation Australia (2008–2015)
- Director, Johnny Warren Football Foundation (2012–2014)
- Director, Football Federation Australia (2015 – 2018)
- Chair of the Appeals Tribunal, Capital Football (2021–2025)

Moulis was inducted into the Greek Australian Sports Hall of Fame in 2000 and was made a Member of the Capital Football Hall of Fame (Player) in 2002.
