= Pratten Park =

Sporting venue in Sydney, Australia

Coordinates: 33°53′35″S 151°7′23″E

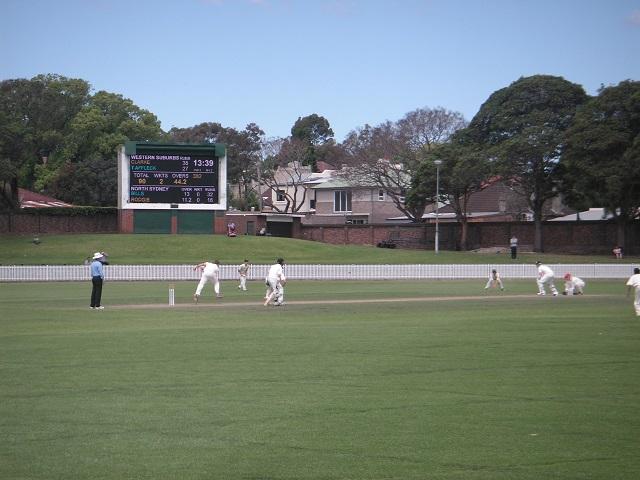
- Michael Clarke batting at Pratten Park 2012
- Interactive map of Pratten Park
- Location: Ashfield, New South Wales, Australia
- Owner: Inner West Council
- Operator: Inner West Council
- Capacity: 4,000
- Surface: Grass

Construction
- Groundbreaking: 1906
- Opened: 12 September 1912
- Renovated: 1920, 1933, 1946, 1953, 2007, 2024

Tenants
- Western Suburbs Magpies (NSWRL) (1912-1914; 1920-1941; 1943-1967 1971-1973; 1977; 1985); Western Suburbs District Cricket Club (Sydney Grade Cricket) (1911-present); Sydney Olympic (NSL) (1981-1986)

Pratten Park is a sporting venue in the suburb of Ashfield in Sydney, Australia. It was officially opened on 12 September 1912 by the Governor of New South Wales, Frederic Thesiger.

Pratten Park was named in honour of Herbert Pratten, an alderman and mayor of Ashfield from 1909-11.

There is a long history of many sports being played at the ground, with the mainstays of tennis, cricket, rugby league, soccer and lawn bowls. The park has also witnessed baseball (1916), dirt track motorcycle racing (1930) and competitive cycling (1925-1940s).

The park is best known as the original home of the Western Suburbs Magpies rugby league team, who played there from 1912 to 1966 and then sporadically from 1971 to 1973 and in 1977 and 1985. The final first grade rugby league match played at the park was on 18 August 1985, where Wests played Penrith, who won the match 42–16. In total, 353 first grade games were played at Pratten Park.

The ground has also been used as by NSL team Sydney Olympic during the 1981-1986 seasons, as well as being used for lower league NSW soccer matches.

Its highest attendance for a rugby league match was 12,407 in a 1964 New South Wales Rugby Football League season game between Western Suburbs and St George, and 13,556 for a soccer game in 1984 between Sydney Olympic and APIA Leichhardt FC.

The ground is still home to the Western Suburbs District Cricket Club.

== Facilities ==
The ground has a grandstand with a capacity of 450 spectators and tiered wooden seating around the oval.

There have been a number of scoreboards throughout the ground's history, with the current scoreboard erected in 1953.

== Sources ==
- Pratten Park at Austadiums
- www.westsmagpies.com.au
