= Mark Koussas =

Australian soccer player

Personal information
- Date of birth: 9 January 1963 (age 63)
- Place of birth: Sydney, New South Wales
- Height: 5 ft 10 in (1.78 m)
- Position: Striker

Youth career
- 1968-1975: Ryde RSL
- 1975-1977: Gladesville-Hornby
- 1978: Western Suburbs

Senior career*
Years	Team	Apps	(Gls)
1979–85	Sydney Olympic		
1986	APIA Leichhardt Tigers		
1987	Rockdale Ilinden		
1994-95	Gladesville United		

International career
1981	Australia U20	4	(4)
1982	Australia	2	(0)
- * Club domestic league appearances and goals

Mark Koussas is a former Australian international football player. He is married to his wife Faye and has two children; Maree and James.

He was awarded the Adidas Golden Boot having scored four goals in the 1981 FIFA World Youth Championship. He is of Greek descent.

He played for Sydney Olympic F.C. and APIA Leichhardt Tigers during his career. He made at least two full international appearances for the Socceroos making his debut against Indonesia in August 1981. During his time as a player at Sydney Olympic, he was in full-time education working towards becoming a computer programmer. After his professional career he played for Gladesville United (now known as Gladesville Ryde Magic FC).
