= Sydney Olympic FC =

Soccer club based in Sydney, New South Wales, Australia

Coordinates: 33°55′0″S 151°5′41″E

Sydney Olympic
- Full name: Sydney Olympic Football Club
- Nicknames: Olympic; Blues; Πανελλήνιος (Panellinios; Panhellenic)
- Founded: 28 November 1957 (68 years ago)
- Ground: Sydney Olympic Park Athletic Centre (Australian Championship); Belmore Sports Ground (NSW League One men's); Belmore, New South Wales
- President: Chris Charalambous
- Coach: Michael Melito (Australian Championship); Pat Marando (NSW League One)
- League: NSW League One (men's)
- 2026: NPL NSW, 16th of 16 (relegated)
- Website: sydneyolympicfc.com
Home colours	Away colours

Sydney Olympic FC is a soccer club based in Sydney, New South Wales (NSW). A member-owned club, its senior men's team plays at the Belmore Sports Ground, in the NSW League One. Its senior women's team plays at The Crest, in the NPL NSW Women's in the second and third tiers for men's of the Australian league system, respectively. It also competes in the Australian Championship as a foundation club.

One of many Greek Australian soccer clubs, it was formed in November 1957 as Pan Hellenic SC, and rose to Football NSW's first division in 1961. The club failed to find on-field success in the state league, though strong fan support and financial stability gained it entry into the National Soccer League (NSL) as a charter member in 1977, when it adopted its current name. Olympic would play 27 seasons in the league, winning two championships and two NSL Cups. Following the NSL's demise in 2004, the club returned to NSW's first division, where it has remained since. While the club has historically fielded women's teams in decades past, its modern women's team was founded in 2006, and won promotion to the first division in 2018.

Sydney Olympic has won three NSW men's titles. It reached the NPL's national semi-finals in 2018, and its best performances in the Australia Cup are round of sixteen finishes in 2014 and 2015. Among Olympic's records are the two highest-attended NSL regular season matches – 18,985 in a 1998–99 match against the Northern Spirit, and 18,376 in a 1979 match against Newcastle KB United.

== History ==
=== 1957: Pan-Hellenic – The Beginnings ===
In the late 1940s and 1950s, there were several small Greek teams for the purposes of socialising and giving a sense of home for the newly arrived migrants. These teams included: Taxiarchis, Atlas, Astro, Pansamiakos, as well as several others. Many people wondered about uniting all of these smaller teams to establish 1 strong Greek team in order to participate in the NSW Soccer Federation. The founding date of the club is set as 28 November 1957, as this was the first meeting of Club Founder Christos Giannakoulias at his home in Alexandria, together with Elias Michalopoulos, Giorgos Lagoudakos, Emmanuel Karras, Dimitris Vlachos, and Stelios Papageorgiou. It was decided there that the newly formed team would be known as Pan-Hellenic, as it represented the shared journeys of Greeks from all over the world who migrated to Sydney and not just from Greece and Cyprus, but also from various other places like Egypt, Romania, Albania, Yugoslavia, Bulgaria, Anatolia, and Asia Minor.

The club was established as Pan-Hellenic Soccer Club and its initial strip was blue and white vertical stripes.

=== 1958–60: NSW 2nd Division ===
In its first season in 1958, Pan-Hellenic found itself in the NSW 2nd Division, which at the time was split into 2 groups – Western & Eastern – After topping its group, Pan-Hellenic faced off with Budapest, who had topped the other group, in the Grand Final, which Pan-Hellenic won 3–1. This still was not good enough for promotion, and Pan-Hellenic was forced to play a separate play-off with Budapest for promotion. The initial match ended 1–1, and a replay was ordered a few days later, which Budapest won 4–0.

For season 1959, the Federation did away with a Finals Series and promotion playoffs, instead awarding promotion to the club which topped the competition table after the 26 rounds. Pan-Hellenic would miss out again on promotion, as it finished runner-up to Neerlandia.

In 1960 and in what would become a tradition in Australian Football, the format was changed yet again. A Finals Series would be played this season; Pan-Hellenic reached the Grand Final again, but would go on and lose to Polonia 2–1. But this time, the team which would end up atop the competition ladder was crowned the Champions and would be promoted; fortunately for Pan-Hellenic, they finished top of the ladder 1 point ahead of Polonia, were crowned Champions and finally earned promotion to the NSW 1st Division for 1961.

=== 1960s: NSW 1st Division ===
In its first season in the NSW 1st Division in 1961, the club would finish in the top 4, finishing 4th, a fantastic achievement. In the Finals Series Pan-Hellenic lost its Semi-Final to Hakoah 1–0.

1962 saw Pan-Hellenic finish in 7th place. The 1962 season also saw a competition attendance record for the regular season, with 16,265 spectators attending Pan-Hellenic's home match at Wentworth Park against APIA Leichhardt on July 8th. In 1963, Pan-Hellenic rebounded to once again make the top 4, finishing 4th once again and qualifying for the Finals Series. South Coast United delivered a heavy blow in the Semi-Final, dishing out a 7–1 loss to Pan-Hellenic. The 1963 season also saw the previous season's record attendance for a regular season club match in NSW beaten, when 19,676 spectators saw the 1-1 draw between Pan-Hellenic and APIA Leichhardt.

In 1964, Pan-Hellenic finished a disappointing 6th in the League, while in contrast, it made a better fist of it in the Cup, reaching the Semi-Finals. The Final round of the 1964 league season witnessed a record-breaking attendance for a non-Finals match in Australian club football. Pan-Hellenic and APIA Leichhardt drew 27,150 spectators in a match Pan-Hellenic ultimately lost 6-2 to its old rival.

In 1965, the club endured a difficult League campaign, coming within a whisker of being relegated, finishing 2nd last and having to endure the 3 relegation playoff ties. The first 2 ended in draws (0–0 and 1–1) against Polonia; the 3rd match was a 5–4 result to Pan-Hellenic. 11,000 turned up on a Wednesday night to see the match, a victory which preserved the club's 1st Division status. This was in total contrast with Pan-Hellenic's Cup form, which saw them go on a run all the way to the Final, only to lose 3–1 to Hakoah.

For season 1966, Pan-Hellenic finished in 5th spot. The club would return to Finals Football once again in 1967, finishing in 4th, but would once again fail to progress in the Finals Series. 1967 also saw Pan-Hellenic go on a great run in the inaugural National Club Knock-Out competition the – Australia Cup – falling one game short of the Final, as it lost to APIA Leichhardt 3–2 after extra-time in the Semi-Final.

The 1968 season was the highlight of the pre-National Soccer League era; Pan-Hellenic finished 2nd in the standings and reached the NSW First Division Grand Final for the first time. Pan-Hellenic rode the wave of momentum, crowds of: 11,500, 10,153, 14,521, 18,180 against Polonia, St George, Hakoah and APIA respectively in the back half of the 1968 season, catapulted the team into the Grand Final, Pan-Hellenic would unfortunately lose 4–2 to bitter rivals Hakoah in front of a crowd of 22,111 at the Sydney Sports Ground.

To bring the decade to a close in 1969, Pan-Hellenic would have to settle for a mid-table 6th-placed finish. The club also experienced another great Cup run making it to the Final once again in 1969, a Final it would ultimately lose 3–2 to Prague.

=== 1970s ===
After some poor seasons – 1970 (8th), 1971 (10th), 1972 (7th), 1973 (9th) – 1974 saw a marked improvement in the team under Socceroos coach Rale Rasic. Pan-Hellenic just missed out on the top 4 to finish in 5th spot. In the Cup, the club failed to reach the latter stages.

Season 1975, did see Pan-Hellenic once again make the top 4, finishing in 3rd place, their highest finish in years. In the Finals Series, Pan-Hellenic dispatched Auburn 2–1 in the Semi-Final to make it through to the Preliminary Final. A crowd of 15,374, one of the biggest attendances in years, saw the rivals Pan-Hellenic and APIA go at it again; unfortunately for Pan-Hellenic, it went on to lose 1–0 after extra time to APIA Leichhardt, in a tight and tense affair.

In its final season in the NSW State League for the time being and its last season under the name Pan-Hellenic in 1976, the club just missed out on a Finals spot, ending up in 5th place.

=== 1977: Sydney Olympic and the NSL ===
Chart of yearly table positions for Sydney Olympic in NSL

For 1977, the club became a pioneering founding member of the National Soccer League, and also changed its name to Sydney Olympic.

Sydney Olympic had a tough initiation into National League Football in 1977, finishing 3rd last. 1978 saw a vast improvement from Sydney Olympic as it finished in a much-improved and respectable mid-table position.

In 1979 Sydney Olympic endured another difficult campaign, finishing in 2nd last place. The Federation at the time then made the decision to "cut back" on teams from NSW, and being the last-placed NSW team, beating only South Melbourne, who had finished last, Sydney Olympic was controversially relegated.

=== 1980s ===
The spell back in the NSW First Division competition for the club did not last long, with Sydney Olympic defeating the Parramatta Eagles 4–0 in the 1980 NSW Grand Final to win the NSW First Division. That victory secured Sydney Olympic a return to top-flight Australian football in 1981, where it remained until the NSL folded in 2004.

During the 1980s, Sydney Olympic experienced fluctuations in performance alongside shifts in match attendance.

Seasons 1981 and 1982 were a period of stabilisation for the club, as it settled back into the National Soccer League. Sydney Olympic finished both seasons in the middle of the league table. During this period, several young squad members debuted for the club.

The mid-1980s saw an increase in average home attendance alongside competitive match records for the club.

Between 1983 and 1986, Sydney Olympic played in 4 consecutive National Finals. Beating Heidelberg United in the 1983 NSL Cup Final and beat Preston Lions in the 1985 NSL Cup Final. Sydney Olympic also made it to the NSL Grand Finals of 1984 and 1986, losing to South Melbourne FC and Adelaide City respectively.

After this period, there was an exodus of players at Sydney Olympic, meaning the team almost had to be rebuilt, as only a few players would remain. It showed as the club dropped back to a mid-table finish for season 1987.

Sydney Olympic bounced back in season 1988 to finish 5th and qualify for the Finals Series once again, although they would go on to lose that Semi-Final 3–1 to the Marconi Stallions.

Sydney Olympic placed third in the league phase in 1989, thereby qualifying for the Finals. After winning the Semi-Finals against Melbourne Knights and the Preliminary Finals against St George FC, Sydney Olympic progressed to their third Grand Final of NSL within six years. Sydney Olympic faced defeat against Marconi 1-0 during the Grand Final that took place in Parramatta Stadium with 23,387 spectators in attendance following an injury-time goal. Sydney Olympic made it to the NSL Cup Finals in 1989, but they were beaten 2–0 by Adelaide City.

=== 1990s ===
The 1990s began on the right foot for the club as it sneaked into that year's NSL Finals Series in 5th. After a historic Finals run, winning 3-straight sudden-death Semi-Finals against Adelaide City, South Melbourne and Melbourne Knights, and a year after Sydney Olympic's 1989 NSL Grand Final loss against Marconi, 1990 saw Sydney Olympic meet Marconi once again in the Grand Final. This time it would be Olympic's day as they exacted revenge by beating Marconi 2–0, before a then record NSL crowd of 26,353. Scorers that day were Alistair Edwards and Robert Ironside either side of half-time. 1990 also saw Sydney Olympic reach another NSL Cup Final, their 4th in 8 years, unfortunately going down to South Melbourne.

In defense of their title in season 1990/91, Sydney Olympic endured an inconsistent season, which came down to the last match of the regular season in what became a pre-Finals Series playoff against 6th-placed Parramatta Melita. Sitting in 5th, a draw would have been enough for Olympic to finish in the top 5 and qualify for the Finals, but a late Parramatta goal ensured Olympic would succumb to a 1–0 loss and were leapfrogged into the top 5 by Parramatta FC.

Sydney Olympic surged once again in season 1991/92, missing out on the Minor Premiership by one point. The situation looked promising heading into that season's Finals Series, but it was not to be as Olympic were disappointingly bundled out of the Finals.

The next few seasons were inconsistent for Olympic. 1992/93 (9th), 1993/94 (6th), 1994/95 (9th).

For the 1995/96 season, Sydney Olympic formed a prosperous partnership with the University of Technology Sydney (UTS) and became known as UTS Sydney Olympic. During that time, the club's home ground was Leichhardt Oval; 1995/96 also saw Olympic finish 3rd on the ladder, one point behind eventual Minor Premiers and old foes Marconi. Qualifying for the Finals Series again, Olympic were eventually eliminated by Adelaide City.

A change of home ground awaited the Blues going into season 1996/97. Belmore Sports Ground, in the more traditional heartland of Olympic, became the club's new home. In April 1997, Sydney Olympic enjoyed a record home attendance in the NSL at Belmore, of 16,724 against Marconi. Sydney Olympic missed out on Finals Football, ending the season in 9th.

Season 1997/98 also saw the club's worst ever defeat in January 1998, when the Canberra Cosmos inflicted an 8–1 loss on Sydney Olympic in the nation's capital. This season saw Olympic finish 9th.

During the 1998/99 season, Sydney Olympic was involved in a match which attracted the largest crowd for any regular NSL season match excluding finals. That game was against the Northern Spirit at North Sydney Oval in what was the Spirit's debut match in the NSL. That evening, 18,985 soccer-loving enthusiasts turned out to watch Sydney Olympic defeat new boys Northern Spirit 2–0. Olympic golden boys Chris Kalantzis and Pablo Cardozo were the goal scorers. The season saw Olympic finish 7th, missing the Finals.

=== 2000–2004 ===
The 2000s saw Olympic's fortunes take an upturn. 1999/2000 saw their biggest ever NSL win, a 6–0 defeat of South Melbourne in January 2000 at Belmore Sports Ground. The club would again make the Finals that season, finishing in 5th place. During the Finals Series, Sydney Olympic beat Adelaide City over 2 legs, but would go on to lose to Carlton SC in extra time for a spot in the Preliminary Final.

In season 2000/01, Sydney Olympic finished 4th on the competition ladder. In the Finals Series, Olympic eliminated Marconi and then Melbourne Knights to make it through to the Preliminary Final, a match they lost 2–0 to the Minor Premiers South Melbourne.

Season 2001/02 saw the club move base again, this time to the Sutherland Shire in Sydney's south, an area with no NSL representation, but a large base of registered junior players to potentially tap into. Olympic played out of Toyota Park. The move had also involved a change of name from Sydney Olympic to Olympic Sharks, with the traditional blue and white colours of the club still in place. This season also saw Olympic capture their 2nd NSL Championship, a lone Ante Milicic goal early in the second half being enough to defeat Perth Glory at Subiaco Oval in front of 42,735 fans.

The 2002/03 season saw Sydney Olympic win its first ever Minor Premiership by finishing on top of the NSL ladder, which eventually led to Olympic's second consecutive appearance in the NSL Grand Final. This time, however, it would be the Perth Glory who would take out the title, winning 2–0 in Perth, in front of 38,111 fans.

Despite the on-field successes, the move to the Sutherland Shire was short-lived. Poor attendances took their toll on the venture, and for season 2003/04 the club chose to revert to the widely preferred name of Sydney Olympic and moved to OKI Jubilee Stadium at Kogarah.

=== 2004–2009: Back to the State Leagues ===
Following the demise of the NSL in 2004, Sydney Olympic participated in the 2004/05 NSW Premier League season and just missed out on the Finals Series. In 2006 Sydney Olympic returned to Belmore Sports Ground, where the club had a mid-table finish of 6th.

2007 was a special year for Sydney Olympic as it celebrated the 50th anniversary of its founding, with the club's jersey reverting to the original blue and white vertical striped design. On the field, it would turn out to be a forgettable year for the club, as it ended the season in 9th spot.

In the 2008 season under the stewardship of former player Milan Blagojevic, the club laid the platform for what would be a successful season by capturing the 2008 pre-season Johnny Warren Cup with a gutsy 2–1 win over the Sutherland Sharks. During the regular season, Sydney Olympic finished 3rd on the ladder, their best league finish since the 2002/03 NSL season. In the ensuing Finals Series, Olympic were stopped 1 game short of that season's Grand Final, losing in the Preliminary Final to Sutherland. The 2008 season also saw Olympic make the Waratah Cup Final, only to lose that Final.

In season 2009, Sydney Olympic dropped back down the ladder, ending the season in a disappointing 8th spot.

=== 2010s ===
The new decade would start miserably. Season 2010 saw Sydney Olympic equal their worst-ever league finish, ending the season in 2nd last spot.

In 2011, Sydney Olympic, with a new coaching staff and many new players, finished in 1st place, four points clear of Sydney rivals Sydney United FC to claim the Minor Premiership. In the Finals Series, Olympic beat Sydney United 2–0 in the Semi-Final and beat them again by the same scoreline in the Grand Final, in front of 10,000+ fans at Belmore Sports Ground, and went on to become NSW Champions again.

2012 saw Sydney Olympic finish 2nd in the NSW Premier League, but were bundled out of the Finals Series in straight sets, and in 2013 Sydney Olympic finished a disappointing 7th.

In 2014, former Greek international centre-back Sotirios Kyrgiakos signed for the club. Kyrgiakos stated in the press conference:

"It's a beautiful thing for me to come to Sydney & play football in Australia. I wanted to have this experience and this opportunity was available for a handful of games, which was the proposal from the club. I will be thrilled to get to know Australian football and experience it and it's very significant that I'm coming to a very historic club with great Greek support."

Sydney Olympic finished the regular season in 4th, before embarking on an amazing Finals run. Winning 3 sudden-death matches in succession to make it to the NSW Grand Final, only to lose 2–1 to Blacktown City after extra time. In 2014, Sydney Olympic also made it to the FFA Cup Round of 16, only to be defeated 2–1 by Bentleigh Greens after a compressed end-of-year schedule eventually took its toll on the team.

In 2015 Sydney Olympic finished 4th in the regular season again after a great end to the regular season, which saw the team win 5 straight matches. After a convincing 2–0 victory in the first week of the Finals against Wollongong Wolves, the team set up a Semi-Final showdown against old rivals APIA Leichhardt, who took a 1–0 lead via a deflection. Sydney Olympic could not capitalise on a string of great chances in the second half to equalise, seeing the team eliminated 1–0. In 2015, Sydney Olympic again made it to the Round of 16 stage of the FFA Cup, but were disappointingly eliminated following a 3–1 loss to Hume City FC.

For 2016, Sydney Olympic endured an up-and-down season where it finished the season in 6th spot. In 2017, Sydney Olympic reached the Finals again, but were knocked out by Manly United in the first week. The club was also knocked out of the Cup in the early rounds in both 2016 and 2017.

In 2018, Sydney Olympic returned to winning ways. First clinching the Minor Premiership in a nail-biting last day of the season by leap-frogging old rivals APIA Leichhardt to finish top. This was added to by winning the Grand Final 3–1 and being crowned Champions, also against APIA Leichhardt.

In 2019, Sydney Olympic experienced a variable season trying to defend their title from the previous season. Finishing the season 6th, they missed the Finals. They were also knocked out of the Cup in the early rounds.

=== 2020s ===
Due to the outbreak of the COVID-19 pandemic, the 2020 season was suspended in April after 3 Rounds. The competition only resumed after a 4-month hiatus and returned in August, as a shortened 11-round season, with the club finishing in 4th position. Both the State and National Cup competitions were cancelled.

2021 would also be a season affected by the ongoing COVID-19 pandemic. The State Cup was cancelled, as was the League season, which was officially announced by Football NSW on August 12, 2021, with Sydney Olympic sitting in 4th spot at the time. Meanwhile, the 2021 FFA Cup season was rescheduled and took place, with Sydney Olympic making it to the Round of 32 stage before being knocked out 4–2 by Sydney FC.

2022 saw Sydney Olympic win the NSW NPL Minor Premiership, clinching it on the final day with victory over Blacktown City to leapfrog them to top spot. In the Finals Series, the club was disappointingly bundled out 1 game short of the Grand Final. Meanwhile in the Cup, the club was eliminated in the early rounds.

In 2023, the club finished a disappointing 9th in the League, as well as being knocked out of the Cup in the early rounds. Hopes were high for a return to the top for Sydney Olympic in 2024; however, the club experienced yet another poor season, finishing a disappointing 8th in the League. In the Cup competitions, the club once again failed to progress to the latter rounds.

Season 2025 promised much for Sydney Olympic; however, the club once again experienced an unsatisfactory season, finishing the League season in 7th place and missing out on the Top 6 Finals Series. There was no redemption for the club in either Cup Competition, as it was eliminated in the early rounds.

=== Australian Championship era ===
Sydney Olympic announcement officially play in Australian Championship from October 2025 after submitting to the Australian Professional League and the club's founder from eight teams on 20 November 2023. They will continue to play in the NPL NSW for the 2024 and 2025 season, before transitioning to the new league following season.

Sydney Olympic's first foray into this new competition saw a continuation of its poor recent results, failing to get out of its group by finishing 3rd in Group A, which featured South Melbourne, Moreton City Excelsior and Broadmeadow Magic, and thus failing to qualify for the Quarter-Final Knock-Out stage of the competition.

== Players ==
=== Current squad ===
==== Australian Championship squad ====
As of 15 October 2026

Note: Flags indicate national team as defined under FIFA eligibility rules; some limited exceptions apply. Players may hold more than one non-FIFA nationality.

No.	Pos.	Nation	Player
2	DF	AUS	Peter Politis
3	DF	AUS	Lachlan Griffiths
4	DF	THA	Aaron Gurd (on loan from Sydney FC)
5	DF	AUS	Aiden Mostofi
6	DF	AUS	Luke Croll
7	MF	NZL	Seth Clark
9	MF	AUS	Kosta Petratos
10	FW	AUS	Dimitri Petratos
11	FW	SYR	Moudi Najjar
12	FW	AUS	Kaan Nizam
15	FW	AUS	Carter Foxe

No.	Pos.	Nation	Player
17	DF	NZL	Zac Zoricich
19	FW	AUS	Michael Ruhs
20	GK	POL	Filip Kurto
21	MF	AUS	Adam Bugarija
22	GK	AUS	Cayden Henderson
23	FW	AUS	Ollie Wiggin
24	DF	AUS	Ben van Dorssen
26	MF	AUS	Luke Brattan
27	MF	AUS	Charlie Roberts
28	DF	AUS	Nicolas Hagios
29	DF	LBN	Khoder Kaddour

==== FNSW League One squad ====
Note: Flags indicate national team as defined under FIFA eligibility rules; some limited exceptions apply. Players may hold more than one non-FIFA nationality.

No.	Pos.	Nation	Player
—	GK	AUS	Mathew Nikolovski
—	DF	AUS	Maxamillion Luburic
—	MF	AUS	Marcus Fernandez
—	MF	AUS	Praneet Singh
—	MF	AUS	Lachlan Sepping
—	DF	AUS	Joshua Hong
—	FW	AUS	Thomas López
—	FW	AUS	Jacob Vasiliou
—	FW	AUS	Mikah Chilas
—	MF	AUS	Ante Vojvodic
—	MF	AUS	Luka Strbac
—	MF	AUS	Marko Sinozic

No.	Pos.	Nation	Player
—		AUS	Stefan Giglio
—	DF	AUS	Ryan Devine
—	MF	AUS	George Louca
—	DF	AUS	Jok Akuien
—	DF	AUS	Morrie Kamara
—	MF	AUS	Joshua Okan
—	FW	AUS	Marco Arambasic
—	DF	AUS	Jacob Tresoglavic
—	FW	AUS	Bailey Callaghan
—		AUS	Faraz Rahimi

=== Player records ===
Appearances

- 1. – 412 – Gary Meier
- 2. – 302 – Gary Phillips
- 3. – 281 – David Barrett
- 4. – 259 – Peter Raskopoulos
- 5. – 258 – William Angel
- 6. – 251 – Tony Spyridakos
- 7. – 246 – Paul Henderson
- 8. – 230 – Comino Omeros
- 9. – 217 – Brian Smith
- 10. – 210 – Elias Augerinos
- 10. – 210 – Ante Juric
- 12. – 204 – Graham Jennings

Goals

- 1. – 83 – Brian Smith
- 2. – 69 – Dave Harding
- 3. – 68 – Pablo Cardozo
- 4. – 61 – Roy O'Donovan
- 5. – 60 – Marshall Soper
- 5. – 60 – Norman Tome
- 7. – 53 – Mark Koussas
- 7. – 53 – Abbas Saad
- 9. – 52 – John Karagiannis
- 10. – 51 – Kostas Karanikolas
- 10. – 51 – Sotiris Patrinos
- 12. – 50 – Doug Logan

=== International players ===
Australia

- Terry Antonis
- Walter Ardone
- Andy Bernal
- Milan Blagojevic
- Roy Blitz
- Clint Bolton
- Tim Cahill
- Nick Carle
- Pablo Cardozo
- Jason Culina
- John Doyle
- Alistair Edwards
- Brett Emerton
- Rodolfo Gnavi
- Troy Halpin
- Dave Harding
- Robert Hooker
- Graham Jennings
- Ante Juric
- Chris Kalantzis
- John Karaspyros
- Peter Katholos
- John Kosmina
- Mark Koussas
- Massimo Luongo
- Garry Manuel
- Ante Milicic
- Dave Mitchell
- Danny Moulis
- Jade North
- Scott Ollerenshaw
- Jim Patikas
- Dimitri Petratos
- Jason Polak
- Tom Pondeljak
- Peter Raskopoulos
- Abbas Saad
- Marshall Soper
- Tony Spyridakos
- Kimon Taliadoros
- Kris Trajanovski
- Alan Westwater
- Lindsay Wilson
- Ned Zelic

Greece

- Sotirios Kyrgiakos
- Takis Loukanidis
- Kostas Davourlis
- Vassilis Stravopodis

New Zealand

- Andrew Durante
- Clint Gosling
- Kevin Hagan
- Ricki Herbert
- Robert Ironside
- Michael McGarry
- Glen Moss
- Chris Zoricich

Lebanon

- Yahya El Hindi

Liberia

- Mass Sarr Jr.

Philippines

- Iain Ramsay

Scotland

- David Provan

Uruguay

- Vicente Estavillo

Wales

- Ian Rush

Netherlands

- Wim van der Gaag

== Club officials ==
Directors

- President: Chris Charalambous
- Directors: Damon Hanlin, Tasso Balomenos, Chris Gardiner, Lawrie McKinna

Management

- CEO:
- Head coach: Pat Marando
- Australian Championship head coach: Michael Melito
- Assistant coach:
- Under 20s Coach:
- Women's First Grade Coach: Alberto Di Sciascio
- Women's Reserve Grade Coach: Arthur Beltsos

== Former coaches ==
- (Australia) John Phillips
- (Hungary) Gyula Polgár
- (Hungary) Joe Vlasits
- (England) Frank Hearn
- (Greece) Manolis Poulakakis
- (Netherlands) Bill Vrolyks
- (Austria) Walter Tamandl
- (England) Michael Jones
- (Greece) George Yangou
- (Greece) Takis Loukanidis
- (Greece) John Kalogeras
- (Serbia) Rale Rasic
- (Argentina) Raul Blanco
- (England) Bruce Stowell
- (Poland) Kaz Kulak
- (Scotland) Tommy Anderson
- (Australia) Joe Marston
- (Cyprus) John Xipolitas
- (Scotland) Jimmy Adam
- (Scotland) Tommy Docherty
- (England) Doug Collins
- (Germany) Manfred Schaefer
- (Scotland) Eddie Thomson
- (England) Mick Hickman
- (Australia) Peter Raskopoulos
- (Australia) Bertie Mariani
- (Uruguay) Vicente Estavillo
- (Scotland) Tom Sermanni
- (Australia) David Ratcliffe
- (England) Geoff Harcombe
- (Scotland) Dave Mitchell
- (Croatia) Branko Culina
- (Australia) Gary Phillips
- (Australia) Lee Sterrey
- (Greece) Peter Papanikitas
- (Germany) Les Scheinflug
- (Australia) Chris Kalantzis
- (Australia) Milan Blagojevic
- (Australia) Aytek Genc
- (Australia) Nick Theodorakopoulos
- (Australia) Manny Spanoudakis
- (Germany) André Gumprecht
- (Australia) Steve O'Connor
- (Australia) Peter Tsekenis
- (Australia) Grant Lee
- (Portugal) Jaime Monroy
- (Spain) Gorka Etxeberria
- (Australia) Abbas Saad
- (Australia) Terry Palapanis
- (Australia) Ante Juric
- (Australia) Labinot Haliti
- (Australia) David Magrone

== Honours ==
=== Leagues ===
- National Soccer League
  - Winners (2): 1989–90, 2001–02
  - Runners-up (4): 1984, 1986, 1989, 2002–03
- National Soccer League Minor Premiership
  - Winners (1): 2002–03
  - Runners-up (3): 1984, 1986, 1991–92
- National Youth League
  - Winners (1): 1987
  - Runners-up (1): 1991
- NSW Premier League/NSW 1st Division
  - Winners (3): 1980, 2011, 2018
  - Runners-up (2): 1968, 2014
- NSW Premier League/NSW 1st Division Minor Premiership
  - Winners (3): 2011, 2018, 2022
  - Runners-up (3): 1968, 1980, 2012
- NSW Super League/NSW 2nd Division
  - Winners (2): 1958, 1960
  - Runners-up (1): 1959

=== Cups ===
- Australia Cup/NSL Cup/FFA/Australia Cup
  - Winners (2): 1983, 1985
  - Runners-up (2): 1989, 1989–90
  - Semi-finalists (2): 1967, 1995
- NSW State/Federation/Waratah Cup
  - Runners Up (3): 1965, 1994, 2008
  - Semi-finalists (5): 1964, 1997, 2014, 2015, 2026
- Ampol Cup/Johnny Warren Cup
  - Winners (3): 1980, 2008, 2013
  - Runners-Up (2): 1969, 2015
  - Semi-finalists (4): 1967, 1974, 1975, 2006

== Individual honours ==
- NSL Player of the Year Award

1982 – Peter Katholos

- NSL Top Goalscorer Award

1991/1992 – Tim Bredbury
1998/1999 – Pablo Cardozo

- NSL Under 21 Player of the Year Award

1997/1998 – Brett Emerton

- Joe Marston Medal

1989/1990 – Abbas Saad
2001/2002 – Ante Milicic

- NSW 1st Division/NSW NPL Player of the Season

1962 – Angelo Mavropoulos
1976 – Bruce Stowell
2012 – Chris Triantis

- NSW NPL Goalkeeper of the Year Award

2012 – Paul Henderson
2016 – Paul Henderson
2017 – Paul Henderson
2018 – Paul Henderson

- NSW NPL Top Goalscorer Award

2009 – Matthew Mayora
2022 – Roy O'Donovan

== Hall of Fame ==
On 6 March 2018, Sydney Olympic announced their thirteenth Hall of Fame inductee.

- Mark Bosnich
- Nick Carle
- Pablo Cardozo
- Graham Jennings
- Ante Juric
- Chris Kalantzis
- Peter Katholos
- Grant Lee
- Gary Meier
- Les Murray
- Jim Patikas
- Abbas Saad
- Peter Raskopoulos

== Women's team ==
Sydney Olympic has always prided itself on having girls and women's teams of all ages that have represented the club. Going back to the 1970s, 1980s and 1990s, where its teams played throughout various district associations, such as Bankstown, Canterbury, Eastern Suburbs and St George.

In 2006, Sydney Olympic's women's teams were officially re-established to participate in Football NSW competitions. After rising through the Leagues, it achieved promotion to the top tier NPL NSW Women's competition in season 2018.
