= 1985 Newcastle Rosebud United FC season =

Newcastle Rosebud United
1985 season
- Stadium: Adamstown Oval
- National Soccer League: 12th
- NSL Cup: Semi-finals
- Top goalscorer: League: Darren Stewart (5); All: Darren Stewart (5)
- Highest home attendance: 2,862 vs. Sydney Croatia (23 March 1985); National Soccer League
- Lowest home attendance: 408 vs. Blacktown City (29 June 1985); National Soccer League
- Average home league attendance: 1,542
- Biggest win: 2–1 (3 times); 1–0 (3 times); 3–2 (once)
- Biggest defeat: 0–4 vs. Blacktown City (A) (14 April 1985); National Soccer League

The 1985 season was Newcastle Rosebud United's second season in the National Soccer League. Newcastle Rosebud United finished 12th in their National Soccer League season and were eliminated the NSL Cup semi-finals against Sydney Olympic.

== Players ==
Note: Flags indicate national team as defined under FIFA eligibility rules; some limited exceptions apply. Players may hold more than one non-FIFA nationality.

No.	Pos.	Nation	Player
—	DF	AUS	Michael Boogaard
—	FW	AUS	Simon Brandt
—	GK	AUS	Steve Dorman
—		AUS	Brett Fawkes
—	GK	NZL	Clint Gosling
—		AUS	David Jones
—	DF	AUS	Mark Jones
—	MF	AUS	Bernard Kerby
—	DF	AUS	Ralph Maier
—		AUS	Terry Mason
—	MF	AUS	Malcolm McClelland

No.	Pos.	Nation	Player
—	MF	AUS	John McQuarrie
—	MF	AUS	Dean Milosevic
—	DF	AUS	Bobby Naumov
—	DF	AUS	Neil Owens
—		AUS	Neville Power
—	MF	SCO	Stuart Robertson
—	MF	AUS	Joe Senkalski
—	DF	AUS	Darren Stewart
—	DF	AUS	Andrew Thompson
—	FW	ENG	Derek Todd

== Competitions ==
=== Overview ===
Competition	First match	Last match	Starting round	Final position	Record							
Competition	First match	Last match	Starting round	Final position	Pld	W	D	L	GF	GA	GD	Win %
National Soccer League	9 March 1985	18 August 1985	Matchday 1	12th	22	4	4	14	20	45	−25	18.18
NSL Cup	2 March 1985	17 April 1985	First round	Semi-finals	4	3	0	1	7	5	+2	75.00
Total					26	7	4	15	27	50	−23	26.92

Last updated: complete
Source: Competitions

=== National Soccer League ===
==== League table ====
Northern Conference

Pos	Team	Pld	W	D	L	GF	GA	GD	Pts	Qualification or relegation
1	Sydney City	22	15	5	2	42	19	+23	35	Qualification to Finals series
2	Sydney Croatia	22	14	5	3	50	22	+28	33	Qualification to Finals series
3	Marconi Fairfield	22	11	7	4	44	23	+21	29	Qualification to Finals series
4	Sydney Olympic	22	12	3	7	29	25	+4	27	Qualification to Finals series
5	St George-Budapest	22	7	8	7	31	26	+5	22	Qualification to Finals series
6	Canberra City	22	8	6	8	33	35	−2	22	
7	Inter Monaro	22	7	6	9	29	37	−8	20	
8	Blacktown City	22	7	4	11	30	34	−4	18	
9	APIA Leichhardt	22	7	2	13	20	34	−14	16	
10	Wollongong City	22	5	6	11	29	46	−17	16	
11	Penrith City (R)	22	4	6	12	24	35	−11	14	Relegation to the 1986 NSW State League
12	Newcastle Rosebud United	22	4	4	14	20	45	−25	12	

Source: rsssf.com
Rules for classification: 1) points; 2) goal difference; 3) number of goals scored.
(R) Relegated

Southern Conference

Pos	Team	Pld	W	D	L	GF	GA	GD	Pts	Qualification
1	South Melbourne	22	14	5	3	39	21	+18	33	Qualification to Finals series
2	Brunswick Juventus (C)	22	11	7	4	33	19	+14	29	Qualification to Finals series
3	Heidelberg United	22	10	7	5	29	17	+12	27	Qualification to Finals series
4	Melbourne Croatia	22	9	6	7	29	21	+8	24	Qualification to Finals series
5	Preston Makedonia	22	9	6	7	30	28	+2	24	Qualification to Finals series
6	Sunshine George Cross	22	8	7	7	25	22	+3	23	
7	Brisbane Lions	22	9	4	9	29	29	0	22	
8	Green Gully	22	6	6	10	24	29	−5	18	
9	Adelaide City	22	6	6	10	29	35	−6	18	
10	West Adelaide	22	6	5	11	24	37	−13	17	
11	Brisbane City	22	6	5	11	25	42	−17	17	
12	Footscray JUST	22	5	2	15	25	41	−16	12	

Updated to match(es) played on unknown. Source: rsssf.com
Rules for classification: 1) points; 2) goal difference; 3) number of goals scored.
(C) Champions

==== Results summary ====
Overall								Home						Away					
Pld	W	D	L	GF	GA	GD	Pts	W	D	L	GF	GA	GD	W	D	L	GF	GA	GD
22	4	4	14	20	45	−25	16	2	3	6	12	20	−8	2	1	8	8	25	−17

Source: worldfootball.net

==== Results by round ====
Round	1	2	3	4	5	6	7	8	9	10	11	12	13	14	15	16	17	18	19	20	21	22
Ground	H	A	H	A	H	A	H	A	H	A	H	A	H	A	H	A	H	A	H	A	H	A
Result	L	D	L	L	D	L	W	W	D	W	D	L	L	L	L	L	L	L	L	L	W	L
Position	9	10	10	11	11	11	10	10	10	9	8	9	9	10	11	11	11	11	12	12	12	12

Source: worldfootball.net
A = Away; H = Home; W = Win; D = Draw; L = Loss

==== Matches ====
9 March 1985 1	Newcastle Rosebud United	0–1	Sydney Olympic	Newcastle
		Report	Soper 85'	Stadium: Adamstown Oval; Attendance: 2,215; Referee: Gary Power

17 March 1985 2	Marconi Fairfield	2–2	Newcastle Rosebud United	Sydney
	Jankovics 65'; Brown 87'	Report	McClelland 81'; Milosevic 83'	Stadium: Marconi Stadium; Attendance: 1,411; Referee: Arthur Owens

23 March 1985 3	Newcastle Rosebud United	1–2	Sydney Croatia	Newcastle
	Senkalski 27' (pen.)	Report	Odzakov 59'; Arnold 71'	Stadium: Adamstown Oval; Attendance: 2,862; Referee: Tim Davies

31 March 1985 4	St George-Budapest	3–0	Newcastle Rosebud United	Sydney
	Koczka 9', 47'; Cotton 40'	Report		Stadium: St George Stadium; Attendance: 1,136; Referee: Peter Rampley

6 April 1985 5	Newcastle Rosebud United	2–2	Canberra City	Newcastle
	McQuarrie 80'; Jones 87'	Report	Harkins 13'; Phillips 19'	Stadium: Adamstown Oval; Attendance: 1,988; Referee: Graham Warne

14 April 1985 6	Blacktown City	4–0	Newcastle Rosebud United	Sydney
	Wheatley 32'; O'Connor 62'; Larkin 75' (pen.); McKie 78'	Report		Stadium: Gabbie Stadium; Attendance: 690; Referee: Terry Seacy

20 April 1985 7	Newcastle Rosebud United	2–1	APIA Leichhardt	Newcastle
	Stewart 54'; Senkalski 76' (pen.)	Report	Colagiuri 45'	Stadium: Adamstown Oval; Attendance: 1,543; Referee: Jim Reeves

22 May 1985 8	Wollongong City	1–2	Newcastle Rosebud United	Wollongong
	Willis 67'	Report	Owens 55'; Todd 75'	Stadium: Wollongong Showground; Attendance: 502; Referee: Arthur Owens

4 May 1985 9	Newcastle Rosebud United	1–1	Sydney City	Newcastle
	Todd 87'	Report	Farina 5'	Stadium: Adamstown Oval; Attendance: 1,653; Referee: Peter Rampley

12 May 1985 10	Inter Monaro	1–2	Newcastle Rosebud United	Queanbeyan
	Thamnidis 35'	Report	Kerby 24'; Owens 24'	Stadium: Seiffert Oval; Attendance: 617; Referee: Bob Marshall

18 May 1985 11	Newcastle Rosebud United	1–1	Penrith City	Newcastle
	McQuarrie 6'	Report	Owens 55' (o.g.)	Stadium: Adamstown Oval; Attendance: 1,149; Referee: Ken Small

26 May 1985 12	Sydney Olympic	2–0	Newcastle Rosebud United	Sydney
	Provan 36'; Soper 48'	Report		Stadium: Pratten Park; Attendance: 2,985; Referee: Tim Davies

10 June 1985 14	Sydney Croatia	2–0	Newcastle Rosebud United	Sydney
	Arnold 11', 22'	Report		Stadium: King Tomislav Park; Attendance: 4,200; Referee: Gary Power

15 June 1985 15	Newcastle Rosebud United	3–4	St George-Budapest	Newcastle
	Power 78'; McQuarrie 81'; Stewart 89'	Report	Morgan 28', 58', 60' (pen.); Slater 77'	Stadium: Adamstown Oval; Attendance: 1,653; Referee: Glyn Davies

19 June 1985 13	Newcastle Rosebud United	0–2	Marconi Fairfield	Newcastle
		Report	Carter 28'; Brown 74'	Stadium: Adamstown Oval; Attendance: 1,285; Referee: Arthur Owens

23 June 1985 16	Canberra City	3–1	Newcastle Rosebud United	Canberra
	Byrne 12'; Sermanni 33'; Lamond 68'	Report	Stewart 37'	Stadium: Bruce Stadium; Attendance: 810; Referee: Glyn Davies

29 June 1985 17	Newcastle Rosebud United	0–3	Blacktown City	Newcastle
		Report	Bradley 69', 89'; O'Connor 78'	Stadium: Adamstown Oval; Attendance: 408; Referee: Terry Steacy

7 July 1985 18	APIA Leichhardt	1–0	Newcastle Rosebud United	Sydney
	Steven 42'	Report		Stadium: Lambert Park; Attendance: 519; Referee: Peter Rampley

13 July 1985 19	Newcastle Rosebud United	1–3	Wollongong City	Newcastle
	Senkalski 51'	Report	Brodnik 24'; Stefanovski 73'; Godzik 79'	Stadium: Adamstown Oval; Attendance: 1,310; Referee: Roger Doenau

21 July 1985 20	Sydney City	2–0	Newcastle Rosebud United	Sydney
	Farina 58', 68'	Report		Stadium: ES Marks Athletics Field; Attendance: 1,000; Referee: Arthur Owens

27 July 1985 21	Newcastle Rosebud United	1–0	Inter Monaro	Newcastle
	Stewart 43'	Report		Stadium: Adamstown Oval; Attendance: 900; Referee: Dave Nugent

18 August 1985 22	Penrith City	4–1	Newcastle Rosebud United	Sydney
	Easthorpe 50', 58', 84'; Campbell 51'	Report	Stewart 24'	Stadium: Cook Park; Attendance: 566; Referee: Gary Power

=== NSL Cup ===
2 March 1985 First round	Cardiff	0–1	Newcastle Rosebud United	Newcastle
		Report	D. Jones 39'	Stadium: Adamstown Oval; Attendance: 1,250; Referee: Jim Reeves

20 March 1985 Second round	Newcastle Rosebud United	3–2	Wollongong City	Newcastle
	D. Jones 43', 63'; McQuarrie 65'	Report	Kotamanidis 13'; Giannone 19'	Stadium: Adamstown Oval; Attendance: 1,073; Referee: Richard Lorenc

10 April 1985 Quarter-finals	Newcastle Rosebud United	1–0 (a.e.t.)	Brisbane Lions	Newcastle
	Senkalski 98' (pen.)	Report		Stadium: Adamstown Oval; Attendance: 1,787; Referee: Gary Power

17 April 1985 Semi-finals	Sydney Olympic	3–2 (a.e.t.)	Newcastle Rosebud United	Sydney
	Phillips 3' (pen.), 60' (pen.); Koussas 94'	Report	Todd 7', 25'	Stadium: St George Stadium; Attendance: 3,155; Referee: Peter Rampley

== Statistics ==
=== Appearances and goals ===
Players with no appearances not included in the list.

No.	Pos.	Nat.	Name	National Soccer League		NSL Cup		Total	
No.	Pos.	Nat.	Name	Apps	Goals	Apps	Goals	Apps	Goals
—	DF	(Australia)	Michael Boogaard	21	0	3	0	24	0
—	FW	(Australia)	Simon Brandt	13(1)	0	1(2)	0	17	0
—	GK	(Australia)	Steve Dorman	1	0	0	0	1	0
—		(Australia)	Brett Fawkes	1(1)	0	1	0	3	0
—	GK	(New Zealand)	Clint Gosling	21	0	4	0	25	0
—		(Australia)	David Jones	17	1	4	3	21	4
—	DF	(Australia)	Mark Jones	15	0	3	0	18	0
—	MF	(Australia)	Bernard Kerby	14	1	4	0	18	1
—	DF	(Australia)	Ralph Maier	22	0	4	0	26	0
—		(Australia)	Terry Mason	0(2)	0	0	0	2	0
—	MF	(Australia)	Malcolm McClelland	2	1	2	1	4	2
—	MF	(Australia)	John McQuarrie	20	3	3	0	23	3
—	MF	(Australia)	Dean Milosevic	12(5)	1	2	0	19	1
—	DF	(Australia)	Bobby Naumov	4(1)	0	0	0	5	0
—	DF	(Australia)	Neil Owens	17	2	4	0	21	2
—		(Australia)	Neville Power	4	1	0	0	4	1
—	MF	(Scotland)	Stuart Robertson	0	0	0(1)	0	1	0
—	MF	(Australia)	Joe Senkalski	21	3	4	1	25	4
—	DF	(Australia)	Darren Stewart	12(4)	5	2	0	18	5
—	DF	(Australia)	Andrew Thompson	12	0	2	0	14	0
—	FW	(England)	Derek Todd	13(2)	2	1(1)	2	17	4

=== Clean sheets ===
Rank	No.	Pos	Nat	Name	National Soccer League	NSL Cup	Total
1	—	GK	(Australia)	Clint Gosling	1	2	3
Total					1	2	3
