= 1985 in Australian soccer =

Soccer in Australia
- Season: 1985

Men's soccer
- NSL Premiership: Sydney City; South Melbourne
- NSL Championship: Brunswick Juventus
- NSL Cup: Sydney Olympic

The 1985 season was the 16th season of national competitive soccer in Australia and 102nd overall.

== National teams ==
=== Australia men's national soccer team ===
==== Results and fixtures ====
===== Friendlies =====
| 27 September 1985 Ampol Cup | Australia | 3–0 | China | Brisbane, Australia |
| | Kosmina 9'; Crino 14'; Watson 63' | Report | | Stadium: Lang Park; Attendance: 4,823; Referee: Bill Monteverde (Australia) |

===== 1986 FIFA World Cup qualification =====
====== Group C ======
| Pos | Team | Pld | W | D | L | GF | GA | GD | Pts | Qualification | Australia | Israel | New Zealand | Chinese Taipei for Olympic games |
|---|---|---|---|---|---|---|---|---|---|---|---|---|---|---|
| 1 | Australia | 6 | 4 | 2 | 0 | 20 | 2 | +18 | 10 | Advance to Inter-confederation play-offs | — | 1–1 | 2–0 | 8–0 |
| 2 | Israel | 6 | 3 | 1 | 2 | 17 | 6 | +11 | 7 | | 1–2 | — | 3–0 | 5–0 |
| 3 | New Zealand | 6 | 3 | 1 | 2 | 13 | 7 | +6 | 7 | | 0–0 | 3–1 | — | 5–0 |
| 4 | Chinese Taipei | 6 | 0 | 0 | 6 | 1 | 36 | −35 | 0 | | 0–7 | 0–6 | 1–5 | — |

Source: RSSSF

| 21 September 1985 | New Zealand | 0–0 | Australia | Auckland, New Zealand |
| | | Report | | Stadium: Mount Smart Stadium; Attendance: 14,286; Referee: Keith Hackett (England) |

| 8 October 1985 | Israel | 1–2 | Australia | Ramat Gan, Israel |
| | Armeli 65' | Report | Mitchell 46'; Kosmina 50' | Stadium: Ramat Gan Stadium; Attendance: 45,000; Referee: Luigi Agnolin (Italy) |

| 20 October 1985 | Australia | 1–1 | Israel | Melbourne, Australia |
| | Ratcliffe 32' | Report | Cohen 47' | Stadium: Olympic Park; Attendance: 27,000; Referee: José Rosa dos Santos (Portugal) |

| 23 October 1985 | Chinese Taipei | 0–7 | Australia | Adelaide, Australia |
| | | Report | Dunn 2', 89' (pen.); Chiang 13' (o.g.); Mitchell 57', 59', 87'; Arnold 68' | Stadium: Hindmarsh Stadium; Attendance: 2,000; Referee: John Cameron (New Zealand |

| 27 October 1985 | Australia | 8–0 | Chinese Taipei | Sydney, Australia |
| | Odžakov 41', 56', 69'; Crino 52'; Kosmina 65' (pen.), 72', 88'; Gray 89' | Report | | Stadium: St George Stadium; Attendance: 2,694; Referee: Bill Munro (New Zealand) |

| 3 November 1985 | Australia | 2–0 | New Zealand | Sydney, Australia |
| | Kosmina 12'; Mitchell 48' | Report | | Stadium: Sydney Sports Ground; Attendance: 21,910; Referee: Gerard Guerds (Netherlands |

====== Inter-confederation play-offs ======
| 20 November 1985 First leg | Scotland | 2–0 | Australia | Glasgow, Scotland |
| | Cooper 53'; McAvennie 59' | Report | | Stadium: Hampden Park; Attendance: 62,239; Referee: Vojtech Christov (Czechoslovakia) |

| 4 December 1985 Second leg | Australia | 0–0 | Scotland | Melbourne, Australia |
| | | Report | | Stadium: Olympic Park; Attendance: 29,852; Referee: José Roberto Wright (Brazil) |

=== Australia men's national under-20 soccer team ===
==== Results and fixtures ====
===== 1985 FIFA World Youth Championship =====
====== Group C ======
| Pos | Team | Pld | W | D | L | GF | GA | GD | Pts | Qualification |
|---|---|---|---|---|---|---|---|---|---|---|
| 1 | Soviet Union (H) | 3 | 2 | 1 | 0 | 7 | 1 | +6 | 5 | Advance to knockout stage |
| 2 | Nigeria | 3 | 2 | 0 | 1 | 5 | 4 | +1 | 4 | Advance to knockout stage |
| 3 | Australia | 3 | 0 | 2 | 1 | 2 | 3 | −1 | 2 | |
| 4 | Canada | 3 | 0 | 1 | 2 | 0 | 7 | −7 | 1 | |

Source: RSSSF
(H) Hosts

| 24 August 1985 | Soviet Union | 0–0 | Australia | Minsk, Soviet Union |
| 15:00 MT | | Report | | Stadium: Dinamo Stadium; Attendance: 16,000; Referee: Victoriano Sánchez Arminio (Spain) |

| 27 August 1985 | Australia | 0–0 | Canada | Minsk, Soviet Union |
| 19:00 MT | | Report | | Stadium: Dinamo Stadium; Attendance: 8,000; Referee: Ali Ben Nasser (Tunisia) |

| 29 August 1985 | Australia | 2–3 | Nigeria | Minsk, Soviet Union |
| 19:00 MT | Panagis 27'; Kalantzis 38' (pen.) | Report | Adeleye 63'; Monday 78'; Anunobi 79' | Stadium: Traktor Stadium; Attendance: 7,000; Referee: Shizuo Takada (Japan) |

===== 1985 OFC U-20 Championship =====
| Pos | Team | Pld | W | D | L | GF | GA | GD | Pts | Qualification |
|---|---|---|---|---|---|---|---|---|---|---|
| 1 | Australia (H) | 5 | 5 | 0 | 0 | 20 | 4 | +16 | 10 | Qualification for 1985 FIFA World Youth Championship |
| 2 | Israel | 5 | 3 | 1 | 1 | 15 | 6 | +9 | 7 | |
| 3 | New Zealand | 5 | 3 | 0 | 2 | 21 | 9 | +12 | 6 | |
| 4 | Chinese Taipei | 5 | 2 | 0 | 3 | 7 | 12 | −5 | 4 | |
| 5 | Fiji | 5 | 1 | 1 | 3 | 9 | 12 | −3 | 3 | |
| 6 | Papua New Guinea | 5 | 0 | 0 | 5 | 2 | 31 | −29 | 0 | |

Source: RSSSF
(H) Hosts

| 15 February 1985 | Australia | 2–1 | New Zealand | Sydney, Australia |
| | Panagis 67'; Kalantzis 85' | Report | Cave 30' (pen.) | Referee: Tilinger Yeir (Israel) |

| 17 February 1985 | Australia | 6–1 | Fiji | Sydney, Australia |
| | Kalantzis 21', 78'; Hristodoulou 37', 72'; Panagis 49'; Ingham 62' | Report | Evans 57' (pen.) | Referee: Chen Ming Chen (Chinese Taipei) |

| 20 February 1985 | Australia | 3–0 | Chinese Taipei | Sydney, Australia |
| | Panagis 28'; Bernal 52'; Hristodoulou 60' | Report | | Referee: Don Campbell |

| 22 February 1985 | Australia | 6–0 | Papua New Guinea | Sydney, Australia |
| | Kalantzis 5', 26', 38', 70'; Hristodoulou 21'; Kanesoulis 78' | Report | | Referee: Lennox Sharp (New Zealand) |

| 24 February 1985 | Australia | 3–2 | Israel | Sydney, Australia |
| | Kalantzis 30'; Bundalo 79', 89' | Report | Natan 27'; Klinger 80' | Referee: Chen Ming Chen (Chinese Taipei) |

=== Australia men's national under-17 soccer team ===
==== Results and fixtures ====
===== 1985 FIFA U-16 World Championship =====
====== Group B ======
| Pos | Team | Pld | W | D | L | GF | GA | GD | Pts | Qualification |
|---|---|---|---|---|---|---|---|---|---|---|
| 1 | Australia | 3 | 3 | 0 | 0 | 4 | 1 | +3 | 6 | Advance to knockout stage |
| 2 | West Germany | 3 | 1 | 1 | 1 | 5 | 3 | +2 | 3 | Advance to knockout stage |
| 3 | Argentina | 3 | 1 | 1 | 1 | 5 | 4 | +1 | 3 | |
| 4 | Congo | 3 | 0 | 0 | 3 | 4 | 10 | −6 | 0 | |

Source: RSSSF

| 31 July 1985 | Australia | 1–0 | Argentina | Tianjin, China |
| 19:00 CST | Naven 28' | Report | | Stadium: Minyuan Stadium; Attendance: 20,000; Referee: Joaquin Urrea (Mexico) |

| 2 August 1985 | Australia | 2–1 | Congo | Tianjin, China |
| 19:00 CST | Trimboli 19'; Thodis 42' | Report | Kakou 76' | Stadium: Minyuan Stadium; Attendance: 20,000; Referee: Hassan Abdullah Al Mullah (Qatar) |

| 4 August 1985 | Australia | 1–0 | West Germany | Tianjin, China |
| 19:00 CST | Trimboli 12' | Report | | Stadium: Minyuan Stadium; Attendance: 20,000; Referee: Karim Camara (Guinea) |

====== Knockout stage ======
| 7 August 1985 | Australia | 0–0 (a.e.t.) (2–4 p) | Guinea | Tianjin, China |
| 19:30 CST | | Report | | Stadium: Hongqiao Stadium; Attendance: 20,000; Referee: Claudio Pieri (Italy) |

== Domestic soccer ==
=== National Soccer League ===
For the second season of the conference format in the National Soccer League, Sydney City and South Melbourne won the Premierships from their respective conferences. The Grand Final was played between Sydney City and Brunswick Juventus, which Brunswick won 2–0 on aggregate winning their first national title.

Northern Conference

| Pos | Team | Pld | W | D | L | GF | GA | GD | Pts | Qualification or relegation |
|---|---|---|---|---|---|---|---|---|---|---|
| 1 | Sydney City | 22 | 15 | 5 | 2 | 42 | 19 | +23 | 35 | Qualification to Finals series |
| 2 | Sydney Croatia | 22 | 14 | 5 | 3 | 50 | 22 | +28 | 33 | Qualification to Finals series |
| 3 | Marconi Fairfield | 22 | 11 | 7 | 4 | 44 | 23 | +21 | 29 | Qualification to Finals series |
| 4 | Sydney Olympic | 22 | 12 | 3 | 7 | 29 | 25 | +4 | 27 | Qualification to Finals series |
| 5 | St George-Budapest | 22 | 7 | 8 | 7 | 31 | 26 | +5 | 22 | Qualification to Finals series |
| 6 | Canberra City | 22 | 8 | 6 | 8 | 33 | 35 | −2 | 22 | |
| 7 | Inter Monaro | 22 | 7 | 6 | 9 | 29 | 37 | −8 | 20 | |
| 8 | Blacktown City | 22 | 7 | 4 | 11 | 30 | 34 | −4 | 18 | |
| 9 | APIA Leichhardt | 22 | 7 | 2 | 13 | 20 | 34 | −14 | 16 | |
| 10 | Wollongong City | 22 | 5 | 6 | 11 | 29 | 46 | −17 | 16 | |
| 11 | Penrith City (R) | 22 | 4 | 6 | 12 | 24 | 35 | −11 | 14 | Relegation to the 1986 NSW State League |
| 12 | Newcastle Rosebud United | 22 | 4 | 4 | 14 | 20 | 45 | −25 | 12 | |

Source: rsssf.com
Rules for classification: 1) points; 2) goal difference; 3) number of goals scored.
(R) Relegated

Southern Conference

| Pos | Team | Pld | W | D | L | GF | GA | GD | Pts | Qualification |
|---|---|---|---|---|---|---|---|---|---|---|
| 1 | South Melbourne | 22 | 14 | 5 | 3 | 39 | 21 | +18 | 33 | Qualification to Finals series |
| 2 | Brunswick Juventus (C) | 22 | 11 | 7 | 4 | 33 | 19 | +14 | 29 | Qualification to Finals series |
| 3 | Heidelberg United | 22 | 10 | 7 | 5 | 29 | 17 | +12 | 27 | Qualification to Finals series |
| 4 | Melbourne Croatia | 22 | 9 | 6 | 7 | 29 | 21 | +8 | 24 | Qualification to Finals series |
| 5 | Preston Makedonia | 22 | 9 | 6 | 7 | 30 | 28 | +2 | 24 | Qualification to Finals series |
| 6 | Sunshine George Cross | 22 | 8 | 7 | 7 | 25 | 22 | +3 | 23 | |
| 7 | Brisbane Lions | 22 | 9 | 4 | 9 | 29 | 29 | 0 | 22 | |
| 8 | Green Gully | 22 | 6 | 6 | 10 | 24 | 29 | −5 | 18 | |
| 9 | Adelaide City | 22 | 6 | 6 | 10 | 29 | 35 | −6 | 18 | |
| 10 | West Adelaide | 22 | 6 | 5 | 11 | 24 | 37 | −13 | 17 | |
| 11 | Brisbane City | 22 | 6 | 5 | 11 | 25 | 42 | −17 | 17 | |
| 12 | Footscray JUST | 22 | 5 | 2 | 15 | 25 | 41 | −16 | 12 | |

Updated to match(es) played on unknown. Source: rsssf.com
Rules for classification: 1) points; 2) goal difference; 3) number of goals scored.
(C) Champions

=== NSL Cup ===
==== Final ====
11 August 1985
15:00 AEST

| Sydney Olympic | 2–1 | Preston Makedonia |
|---|---|---|
| Soper 80'; Raskopoulos 82' | Report | Cole 13' |

St George Stadium, Sydney
Attendance: 6,187
Referee: Don Campbell

== Head coach changes ==
This is a list of changes of head coaches within Australian league soccer:

| Team | Outgoing head coach | Head coaches of departure | Date of departure | Position in table | Incoming head coach | Date of appointment |
|---|---|---|---|---|---|---|
| West Adelaide | (Australia) Sam Salabasidis | | 29 January 1985 | Pre-season | (Australia) Neil McGachey | 29 January 1985 |

== Retirements ==
- 29 January 1985: Michael McLaughlin, 20, former Blacktown City striker.
