= Newcastle KB United league record by opponent =

Newcastle KB United was an Australian professional association football club based in Newcastle, New South Wales. The club was formed in 1977 and joined the National Soccer League in the 1978 season.

Newcastle KB United's first team has competed in the National Soccer League and their record against each club faced in the National Soccer League is listed below. Newcastle KB United's first National Soccer League match was against Eastern Suburbs and they met their 20th and last different opponent, Brunswick Juventus, for the first time in the 1984 National Soccer League season. The teams that Newcastle KB United played the most in league competition was Marconi Fairfield and Sydney City, who they first met in the 1978 National Soccer League season; the 11 defeats from 13 meetings against Sydney City was more than they have lost against any other club. Adelaide City drew 7 league encounters with Newcastle KB United, more than any other club. Newcastle KB United had recorded more league victories against Canberra City than against any other club, having beaten them 7 times out of 12 attempts.

== Key ==
- The table includes results of matches played by Newcastle KB United in the National Soccer League.
- The name used for each opponent is the name they had when Newcastle KB United most recently played a league match against them.
- The columns headed "First" and "Last" contain the first and last seasons in which Newcastle KB United played league matches against each opponent.
- P = matches played; W = matches won; D = matches drawn; L = matches lost; Win% = percentage of total matches won
- ‡ Clubs with this background and symbol in the "Opponent" column were defunct during the club's period.

== All-time league record ==
Newcastle KB United league record by opponent
Club	P	W	D	L	P	W	D	L	P	W	D	L	Win%	First	Last	Notes
Club	Home				Away				Total				Win%	First	Last	Notes
Adelaide City	6	2	4	0	6	2	3	1	12	4	7	1	33.33	1978	1983	
APIA Leichhardt	6	5	1	0	5	1	0	4	11	6	1	4	54.55	1978	1984	
Blacktown City	2	1	1	0	2	1	1	0	4	2	2	0	50.00	1980	1981	
Brisbane City	6	1	2	3	6	3	3	0	12	4	5	3	33.33	1978	1983	
Brisbane Lions	6	2	4	0	6	3	0	3	12	4	5	3	33.33	1978	1983	
Brunswick Juventus	0	0	0	0	1	0	0	1	1	0	0	1	0.00	1984	1984	
Canberra City	6	3	0	3	6	4	1	1	12	7	1	4	58.33	1978	1983	
Footscray JUST	6	4	2	0	6	2	1	3	12	6	3	3	50.00	1978	1983	
Green Gully	1	1	0	0	0	0	0	0	1	1	0	0	100.00	1984	1984	
Heidelberg United	6	1	4	1	6	2	0	4	12	3	4	5	25.00	1978	1983	(Note: Record against Fitzroy United included)
Marconi Fairfield	6	4	0	2	7	1	1	5	13	5	1	7	38.46	1978	1984	
Penrith City	0	0	0	0	1	1	0	0	1	1	0	0	100.00	1984	1984	
Preston Makedonia	4	3	1	0	3	1	0	2	7	4	1	2	57.14	1981	1984	
South Melbourne	6	2	3	1	6	2	1	3	12	4	4	4	33.33	1978	1983	
St George-Budapest	5	2	0	3	5	2	1	2	10	4	1	5	40.00	1978	1983	
Sydney City	6	1	1	4	7	0	0	7	13	1	1	11	7.69	1978	1984	(Note: Record against Eastern Suburbs included)
Sydney Olympic	5	1	2	2	5	2	3	0	10	3	5	2	30.00	1978	1983	
West Adelaide	6	3	1	2	6	3	2	1	12	6	3	3	50.00	1978	1983	
Western Suburbs ‡	1	1	0	0	1	0	1	0	2	1	1	0	50.00	1978	1978	
Wollongong City	3	0	2	1	3	0	2	1	6	0	4	2	0.00	1981	1983	
