= 1984 SASF season =

78th season of soccer in South Australia

South Australian Soccer Federation
- Season: 1984
- Dates: ?–6 October

The 1984 South Australian Soccer Federation season was the 78th season of soccer in South Australia and the 23rd to be run by the South Australian Soccer Federation since its reformation in 1962.

== Changes from 1983 ==
=== Promotion and relegation ===
1983 League	Promoted to league	Relegated from league
Division One	Adelaide City Youth; Salisbury United	—
Division Two	Athelstone; Seaford-Noarlunga; Thebarton Asteras; Windsor Melita	Sturt (withdrew)
Metropolitan League	Disbanded	

== Men's competitions ==
=== 1984 SASF Division One ===
SASF Division One
- Season: 1984
- Dates: 24 March–?
- Champions: Adelaide Croatia (2nd title)
- Relegated: Adelaide City Youth; Port Adelaide
- NSL Cup: Adelaide Croatia; West Torrens Birkalla
- Matches: 132
- Goals: 341 (2.58 per match)
- Best Player: John Francis (Eastern Districts Azzurri)
- Top goalscorer: Adrian Santrac (11 goals)
- Biggest home win: Salisbury United 6–0 Adelaide City Youth
- Biggest away win: Port Adelaide 0–5 Eastern Districts Azzurri (7 April)
- Highest scoring: Beograd Woodville 6–4 Elizabeth City

The 1984 SASF Division One season, known as the Rothmans First Division for sponsorship reasons, was the 78th season of first division soccer in South Australia.

Adelaide Croatia were champions for the second time. Adelaide City Youth and Port Adelaide were relegated.

==== League table ====
Pos	Team	Pld	W	D	L	GF	GA	GD	Pts	Qualification or relegation
1	Adelaide Croatia (C)	22	14	7	1	42	14	+28	35	Qualification for NSL Cup, Top Four Cup and Ampol Cup
2	West Torrens Birkalla	22	14	3	5	35	21	+14	31	Qualification for NSL Cup, Top Four Cup and Ampol Cup
3	Beograd Woodville	22	13	4	5	47	20	+27	30	Qualification for Top Four Cup and Ampol Cup
4	Para Hills	22	11	4	7	33	25	+8	26	Qualification for Top Four Cup and Ampol Cup
5	Campbelltown City	22	10	6	6	26	20	+6	26	Qualification for Ampol Cup
6	Salisbury United	22	8	8	6	29	18	+11	24	Qualification for Ampol Cup
7	Elizabeth City	22	7	7	8	27	34	−7	21	
8	Polonia Adelaide	22	7	6	9	22	23	−1	20	
9	West Adelaide Youth	22	7	5	10	20	30	−10	19	
10	Eastern Districts Azzurri	22	5	7	10	26	29	−3	17	
11	Adelaide City Youth (R)	22	3	5	14	22	52	−30	11	Relegation to SASF Division Two
12	Port Adelaide (R)	22	0	4	18	12	55	−43	4	Relegation to SASF Division Two

Source: Socceraust
Rules for classification: 1) points; 2) goal difference; 3) number of goals scored.
(C) Champions; (R) Relegated

==== Results ====
Home \ Away	ACI	CRO	BEO	CAM	EDA	ELI	PAR	POL	POR	SAL	WES	WTB
Adelaide City Youth		1–5	1–4	0–1	4–4	0–1	0–2	1–1	3–1	1–2	0–0	0–2
Adelaide Croatia	2–0		1–1	1–0	0–0	0–0	2–0	2–0	5–0	2–1	1–1	4–3
Beograd Woodville	2–0	3–2		1–2	5–0	6–4	2–1	0–1	5–1	1–1	4–0	2–1
Campbelltown City	5–1	0–2	1–0		1–0	2–1	0–1	2–1	1–0	0–0	2–1	0–1
Eastern Districts Azzurri	3–0	0–1	0–0	1–1		5–0	0–2	1–1	2–0	0–1	1–1	0–2
Elizabeth City	2–3	0–2	1–0	0–0	3–1		1–2	1–1	3–1	0–0	3–1	1–1
Para Hills	2–2	2–2	3–1	1–1	3–1	0–1		4–3	2–1	1–3	0–1	0–1
Polonia Adelaide	3–1	0–1	0–1	0–1	1–1	1–2	0–1		3–0	2–1	1–1	0–2
Port Adelaide	1–2	0–4	0–3	2–2	0–5	2–2	1–1	0–1		0–1	0–0	0–3
Salisbury United	6–0	1–1	0–0	1–1	2–0	0–0	0–2	0–0	3–0		2–3	1–3
West Adelaide Youth	2–1	1–2	0–2	2–1	0–1	3–0	0–3	0–1	1–0	0–3		1–0
West Torrens Birkalla	1–1	0–0	0–4	3–2	1–0	3–1	2–0	0–1	3–2	1–0	2–1	

Source: Socceraust
Legend: Blue = home team win; Yellow = draw; Red = away team win.

==== Top scorers ====
Rank	Player	Club	Goals
1	Adrian Santrac	Beograd Woodville	11

=== 1984 SASF Division Two ===
SASF Division Two
- Season: 1984
- Dates: 24 March–?
- Champions: Cumberland United (1st title)
- Promoted: Cumberland United; Whyalla City
- Matches: 168
- Goals: 450 (2.68 per match)
- Best Player: Tom Middleton (Brighton City)
- Biggest home win: Cumberland United 5–0 Brighton City (5 May); Noarlunga United 5–0 Modbury (19 May)
- Biggest away win: Brighton City 1–6 Modbury (26 May)
- Highest scoring: Brighton City 1–6 Modbury (26 May)

The 1984 SASF Division Two season, known as the Rothmans Second Division for sponsorship reasons, was the 61st season of second division soccer in South Australia.

Cumberland United were champions for the first time and were promoted with Whyalla City.

==== League table ====
Pos	Team	Pld	W	D	L	GF	GA	GD	Pts	Promotion or qualification
1	Cumberland United (C, P)	24	16	6	2	53	12	+41	38	Promotion to SASF Division One and qualification for Ampol Cup
2	Whyalla City (P)	24	15	5	4	48	18	+30	35	Promotion to SASF Division One and qualification for Ampol Cup
3	West Fields APAC	24	16	3	5	37	21	+16	35	
4	USC Lion-Grange	24	16	2	6	49	28	+21	34	
5	Noarlunga United	24	11	6	7	48	34	+14	28	
6	Thebarton Asteras	24	10	7	7	34	31	+3	27	
7	Enfield-Victoria	24	8	5	11	23	38	−15	21	
8	Blackwood	24	7	5	12	40	42	−2	19	
9	Athelstone	24	8	3	13	23	41	−18	19	
10	Windsor Melita	24	8	2	14	29	39	−10	18	
11	Modbury	24	7	3	14	34	52	−18	17	
12	Seaford-Noarlunga	24	3	5	16	11	35	−24	11	
13	Brighton City	24	3	4	17	21	59	−38	10	

Source: Socceraust
Rules for classification: 1) points; 2) goal difference; 3) number of goals scored.
(C) Champions; (P) Promoted

==== Results ====
Results from rounds 20 to 26 are unknown.

Home \ Away	ATH	BLA	BRI	CMB	ENF	MOD	NOA	SEA	THE	USC	WEF	WHY	WIN
Athelstone		0–2	2–0	?	?	2–1	0–3	?	?	0–4	?	0–2	2–1
Blackwood	0–1		3–1	1–3	1–1	?	?	4–2	5–1	1–2	?	?	4–0
Brighton City	1–1	2–2		0–2	3–2	1–6	?	2–1	1–2	?	2–4	?	0–3
Cumberland United	?	?	5–0		3–0	3–0	1–0	4–0	0–1	0–0	3–0	0–0	?
Enfield-Victoria	1–0	2–0	1–0	?		?	2–2	0–1	1–1	?	0–1	?	1–0
Modbury	0–2	2–3	?	1–3	?		?	1–1	0–1	3–4	3–1	1–1	0–3
Noarlunga United	1–1	2–2	?	0–5	4–1	5–0		2–0	1–2	3–2	1–2	?	3–2
Seaford-Noarlunga	1–3	3–2	1–0	?	0–1	0–1	?		0–2	0–1	0–1	?	0–1
Thebarton Asteras	3–2	1–1	2–0	?	0–0	0–2	3–3	?		?	?	1–2	?
USC Lion-Grange	3–1	?	2–0	1–1	0–1	4–1	1–3	3–0	1–2		2–1	3–2	?
West Fields APAC	2–1	3–1	?	2–0	?	2–1	2–0	0–0	?	2–0		0–4	1–0
Whyalla City	4–0	?	4–0	1–1	1–1	1–0	1–2	3–0	3–1	1–0	0–1		2–0
Windsor Melita	?	2–0	1–2	1–1	1–2	?	1–0	1–0	1–5	?	?	0–1	

Source: Socceraust
Legend: Blue = home team win; Yellow = draw; Red = away team win.

== Cup competitions ==
=== 1984 Federation Cup ===
1984 P.G.H. Cup
Tournament details
- Teams: 45

Final positions
- Champions: Eastern Districts Azzurri (2nd title)
- Runners-up: Campbelltown City

Tournament statistics
- Matches played: 44
- Goals scored: 155 (3.52 per match)

The 1984 SASF Federation Cup, known as the P.G.H. Cup for sponsorship reasons, was the 72nd running of the Federation Cup, the main soccer knockout cup competition in South Australia.

Eastern Districts Azzurri were champions for the second time, defeating Campbelltown City 2–1 after extra time in the final. Beograd Woodville were the defending champions, losing 0–1 in the quarter-finals to eventual finalists, Campbelltown City.

==== Format ====
Round	No. of fixtures	Teams	New entries this round
Preliminary round	13	45 → 32	26
First round	16	32 → 16	19
Second round	8	16 → 8	None
Quarter-finals	4	8 → 4	None
Semi-finals	2	4 → 2	None
Final	1	2 → 1	None

==== Preliminary round ====
Winning team	Score	Losing team
Brahma Lodge	6–3 (a.e.t.)	Norwood Old Scholars
West Fields APAC	1–0	Salisbury East
Brighton City	3–0	South Adelaide
Noarlunga United	5–0	Campbelltown
Blackwood	3–0	Flinders University
Enfield-Victoria	6–0	Mount Gambier Centrals
Thebarton Asteras	3–0	Adelaide United

Winning team	Score	Losing team
Seaford-Noarlunga	2–1	Elizabeth Downs
Salisbury Inter	3–2 (a.e.t.)	Whyalla City
Cumberland United	2–0	Tea Tree Gully
USC Lion-Grange	2–1 (a.e.t.)	Adelaide Omonia
Athelstone	5–0	Whyalla Steel United
Windsor Melita	1–0	Whyalla Croatia

==== Bracket ====
First round
Salisbury United	7
Agua	1
Eastern Districts Azzurri	2
West Adelaide Youth	0
Cumberland United	4
Athelstone	0
Adelaide City Youth	0 (4)
Whyalla City	0 (6)
West Fields APAC	2
Windsor Melita	0
Thebarton Asteras	2
Brahma Lodge	1
Blackwood	1
Salisbury Inter	2
USC Lion-Grange	2
Modbury	1
Campbelltown City	3
Enfield-Victoria	0
Para Hills	2
Brighton City	1
Polonia Adelaide	6
Mount Gambier Inter	1
Beograd Woodville	2
Seaford-Noarlunga	1
Port Adelaide	1
Adelaide Croatia	8
West Torrens Birkalla	6
West Beach	0
Noarlunga United	1
Elizabeth City	2
Parafield Gardens	9
Blue Lake	1

Second round
Salisbury United	1
Eastern Districts Azzurri	2
Cumberland United	2
Whyalla City	0
West Fields APAC	3
Thebarton Asteras	1
Salisbury Inter	2
USC Lion-Grange	1
Campbelltown City	3
Para Hills	1
Polonia Adelaide	0
Beograd Woodville	1
Adelaide Croatia	2
West Torrens Birkalla	0
Elizabeth City	0 (4)
Parafield Gardens	0 (5)

Quarter-finals
Eastern Districts Azzurri	2
Cumberland United	0
West Fields APAC	1
Salisbury Inter	0
Campbelltown City	1
Beograd Woodville	0
Adelaide Croatia	3
Parafield Gardens	2

Semi-finals
Eastern Districts Azzurri	2
West Fields APAC	1
Campbelltown City (rep.)	2
Adelaide Croatia	1

Final
Eastern Districts Azzurri (a.e.t.)	2
Campbelltown City	1

=== 1984 Night Series ===
1984 Ampol Cup
Tournament details
- Dates: ?–21 March
- Teams: 8

Final positions
- Champions: Eastern Districts Azzurri (2nd title)
- Runners-up: West Adelaide Youth

The 1984 Night Series, known as the Ampol Cup for sponsorship reasons, was the 32nd running of the Night Series, a pre-season cup competition contested by the top six teams from the previous season's first division and the two newly promoted teams from the second division.

Eastern Districts Azzurri were champions for the second time, defeating West Adelaide Youth in the final, successfully defending their title.

==== Group stage ====
The top two teams from both groups advance to the semi-finals. Adelaide Croatia, Para Hills, Polonia Adelaide and Salisbury United were knocked out in the group stage.

==== Knockout stage ====
Semi-finals
Adelaide City Youth	1
Eastern Districts Azzurri	2
West Adelaide Youth	4
Beograd Woodville	0

Final
Eastern Districts Azzurri
West Adelaide Youth

=== 1984 Top Four Cup ===
1984 Coca-Cola Cup
Tournament details
- Dates: ?–6 October
- Teams: 4

Final positions
- Champions: Adelaide Croatia (1st title)
- Runners-up: Para Hills

The 1984 Top Four Cup, known as the Coca-Cola Cup for sponsorship reasons, was the 15th running of the Top Four Cup, a post-season cup competition contested by the top four teams from the first division.

Adelaide Croatia were champions for the first time, defeating Para Hills 3–2 in the final. Polonia Adelaide were the previous winners, but did not qualify for this season's competition after finishing eighth.

==== Bracket ====
Semi-finals

Final
Adelaide Croatia	3
Para Hills	2
