= Charlie Egan =

Scottish-born Australian soccer player

Personal information
- Date of birth: 14 August 1959 (age 67)
- Place of birth: Kilsyth, Scotland
- Position: Striker

Youth career
- Kirkintilloch Rob Roy

Senior career*
Years	Team	Apps	(Gls)
1979–81	Berwick Rangers	15	(1)
1981	Albion Rovers	1	(0)
1981	Frankston City	22	(20)
1982–87	South Melbourne	153	(73)
1988–90	Brunswick Juventus	56	(17)

International career^{‡}
1982	Australia	2	(0)
1984	Australia B	7	(1)
- * Club domestic league appearances and goals as of 01:57, 4 July 2009(EST) ‡ National team caps and goals as of 11:32, 22 August 2006 (EST)

Charles Egan (born 14 August 1959) is a former Australian international football player of Scottish heritage.

He played in Scotland early in his career but moved to Australia to play for Frankston City in the Victorian State League. In 1981 Charlie Egan won the Victorian Rothmans Medal for being the Victorian State League Soccer Player of the Year. He scored 25 votes while playing for Frankston City that year, 2 ahead of Nelson from Sunshine.

He transferred to South Melbourne Hellas in 1982 where he made a household name for himself throughout Australia. Egan and his striking counterpart Doug Brown became a fiery force in the NSL for Hellas. He transferred to Brunswick Juventus later on. He played 19 matches for Australia and scored 5 goals.

== Coaching career ==
In 2004, he was appointed coach of Altona East Phoenix in the Victorian State League Division 1, where he unsuccessfully guided them to 6th position. He took the coaching position at Altona City SC in 2005 and promoted the team into the Victorian State League Division 2 N/W. In 2006, he coached the team to 3rd position, narrowly missing out on a play-off final for promotion into Victorian State League Division 1.

== Honours ==
South Melbourne

- National Soccer League: 1984

Australia

- Merlion Cup: 1982

Individual

- NSL Top Goalscorer: 1985
