= 1984 in Australian soccer =

Soccer in Australia
- Season: 1984

Men's soccer
- National Soccer League: South Melbourne
- NSL Cup: Newcastle Rosebud United

The 1984 season was the 15th season of national competitive soccer in Australia and 101st overall.

== National teams ==
=== Australia men's national soccer team ===
==== Results and fixtures ====
===== Friendlies =====
3 November 1984	China	3–2	Australia	Beijing, China
		Report	Kosmina ?', ?'	Attendance:

=== Australia women's national soccer team ===
==== Friendlies ====
12 December 1984 Women's World Invitational Tournament	Australia	0–3	New Zealand	Taipei, Taiwan
	Jacobson ?', ?'; Sharpe ?'	Report

13 December 1984 Women's World Invitational Tournament	Chinese Taipei	0–0	Australia	Taipei, Taiwan
		Report

== Domestic soccer ==
=== National Soccer League ===
Northern Conference

Pos	Team	Pld	W	D	L	GF	GA	GD	Pts	Qualification or relegation
1	Sydney City	28	17	8	3	67	21	+46	42	Qualification to Finals series
2	Sydney Olympic	28	16	8	4	61	27	+34	40	Qualification to Finals series
3	Marconi Fairfield	28	12	8	8	58	39	+19	32	Qualification to Finals series
4	APIA Leichhardt	28	12	8	8	43	35	+8	32	Qualification to Finals series
5	Blacktown City	28	12	6	10	43	48	−5	30	Qualification to Finals series
6	Sydney Croatia	28	8	11	9	32	38	−6	27	
7	Penrith City	28	8	10	10	29	41	−12	26	
8	Newcastle Rosebud United	28	11	4	13	35	52	−17	26	
9	Canberra Arrows	28	12	1	15	47	39	+8	25	
10	St George-Budapest	28	8	9	11	38	41	−3	25	
11	Melita Eagles (R)	28	8	8	12	23	38	−15	24	Relegation to the 1985 NSW State League
12	Wollongong City	28	5	5	18	22	59	−37	15	

Updated to match(es) played on unknown. Source: rsssf.com
Rules for classification: 1) points; 2) goal difference; 3) number of goals scored.
(R) Relegated

Southern Conference

Pos	Team	Pld	W	D	L	GF	GA	GD	Pts	Qualification
1	South Melbourne (C)	28	18	4	6	48	20	+28	40	Qualification to Finals series
2	Heidelberg United	28	14	7	7	37	27	+10	35	Qualification to Finals series
3	Melbourne Croatia	28	13	7	8	38	31	+7	33	Qualification to Finals series
4	Brisbane Lions	28	12	6	10	38	36	+2	30	Qualification to Finals series
5	Brunswick Juventus	28	13	4	11	36	42	−6	30	Qualification to Finals series
6	Preston Makedonia	28	11	6	11	42	33	+9	28	
7	Adelaide City	28	10	5	13	33	34	−1	25	
8	Footscray JUST	28	10	5	13	29	33	−4	25	
9	Green Gully	28	9	6	13	34	36	−2	24	
10	West Adelaide	28	8	5	15	40	52	−12	21	
11	Brisbane City	28	8	5	15	21	39	−18	21	
12	Sunshine George Cross	28	5	6	17	24	57	−33	16	

Updated to match(es) played on unknown. Source: rsssf.com
Rules for classification: 1) points; 2) goal difference; 3) number of goals scored.
(C) Champions

==== Finals series ====
Northern Conference

Elimination and qualifying Finals
2	Sydney Olympic	2
3	Marconi Fairfield	1
4	APIA Leichhardt Tigers	3
5	Blacktown City	1

Semi-finals
1	Sydney City	1 (4)
2	Sydney Olympic	1 (2)
3	Marconi Fairfield	3 (3)
4	APIA Leichhardt Tigers	3 (4)

Preliminary Final
2	Sydney Olympic	3
4	APIA Leichhardt Tigers	0

Northern Final
1	Sydney City	1
2	Sydney Olympic	2

Southern Conference

Elimination and qualifying Finals
2	Heidelberg United	1
3	Melbourne Croatia	2
4	Brisbane Lions	4
5	Brunswick Juventus	2

Semi-finals
1	South Melbourne	3
3	Melbourne Croatia	2
2	Heidelberg United	0 (3)
4	Brisbane Lions	0 (2)

Preliminary Final
2	Heidelberg United	3
3	Melbourne Croatia	1

Southern Final
1	South Melbourne	4
2	Heidelberg United	2

===== Grand Final =====
24 October 1984

South Melbourne	2–1	Sydney Olympic
Egan 43', 64'	Report	Koussas 5'

Olympic Park, Melbourne
Attendance: 10,000
Referee: Doug Rennie
28 October 1984

Sydney Olympic	1–2	South Melbourne
Theodorakopoulos 34'	Report	Crino 10'; Yzendoorn 18'

St George Stadium, Sydney
Attendance: 11,221
Referee: Chris Bambridge

=== NSL Cup ===
==== Final ====
12 September 1984

Melbourne Knights	0–1	Newcastle Rosebud United
	Report	Todd 29'

Olympic Park, Melbourne
Attendance: 4,000
Referee: Stewart Mellings
