= Australia men's national soccer B team =

Australian Sports Team

Australia B
- Association: Football Australia
- Most caps: Jim Patikas (9)
- Top scorer: Doug Brown (2)
- FIFA code: AUS
First colours	Second colours

First international
- Australia B 0–0 Rangers (Scotland) (Melbourne, Australia; 27 May 1984)

Biggest win
- Australia B 2–0 China (Canberra, Australia; 23 September 1985)

Biggest defeat
- Australia B 4–0 Rangers (Scotland) (Newcastle, Australia; 7 June 1984)

The Australia men's national soccer B team is a secondary soccer team occasionally as support for the Australia national soccer team. The team has only ever played nine matches; winning one, drawing six, and losing two. It has been inactive since 1985.

== Concept and history ==
The national B team was designed to give games to players who were being considered for call-up to the full national squad. Generally, the team played in friendly matches against other international B teams or club sides.

Australia B were one of several teams which entered a "World Series" held in Australia in 1984, which included Rangers, Juventus, Australia A, Nottingham Forest and Iraklis. They were coached in the tournament by Eddie Thomson

In 1985, Australia B played two games against China in the leadup to the 1987 Ampol Cup between China and Australia. They were coached by John Margaritis in both games.

In 2007, then-Australia coach Graham Arnold, himself a former B international, flagged the idea of reviving the national B team.

== Statistics ==
=== Results and fixtures ===
==== 1984 ====
27 May	Australia B	0–0	(Scotland) Rangers	Melbourne, Australia
				Stadium: Melbourne Cricket Ground; Attendance: 12,000; Referee: Jim Fearn (Australia)

31 May	Australia B	1–2	(Scotland) Rangers	Brisbane, Australia
	Egan 38'		Clark 43'; Ferguson 74'	Stadium: Lang Park; Attendance: 2,257; Referee: Bill Monteverde (Australia)

5 June	Australia B	1–1	(Scotland) Rangers	Adelaide, Australia
	McCulloch 30'		McClelland 32'	Stadium: Hindmarsh Stadium; Attendance: 4,300; Referee: Jim Rossis (Australia)

7 June	Australia B	2–4	(Scotland) Rangers	Newcastle, Australia
	Blair 18'; Brown 85' (pen.)		Paterson 19'; Burns 67'; McCoist 75'; Cooper 78'	Stadium: Adamstown Oval; Attendance: 6,292; Referee: Jim Reeves (Australia)

11 June	Australia B	0–0	(England) Nottingham Forest	Sydney, Australia
				Stadium: Sydney Cricket Ground; Attendance: 1,500; Referee: Garry Power (Australia)

13 June	Australia B	0–0	(Greece) Iraklis	Brisbane, Australia
				Stadium: Lang Park; Attendance: 2,000; Referee: Alan Kibbler (Australia)

17 June	Australia B	1–1	(Greece) Iraklis	Melbourne, Australia
	Brown 67' (pen.)	Report	Papadopoulos	Stadium: Melbourne Cricket Ground; Attendance: 18,732; Referee: Spiers (Australia)

==== 1985 ====
23 September	Australia B	2–0	China	Queanbeyan, Australia
	Petersen 50'; Wade 72'			Stadium: Seiffert Oval; Attendance: 3,000; Referee: Richard Lorenc (Australia)

25 September	Australia B	1–1	China	Sydney, Australia
	Arnold 76'		Ma 28'	Stadium: St George Stadium; Attendance: 1,530; Referee: Garry Power (Australia)

=== Historical statistics ===
- Highest attendance: 18,300 vs. (Greece) Iraklis at Melbourne.
- Biggest victory: 2–0 vs. China, 23 September 1985 at Seiffert Oval, Queanbeyan
- Heaviest defeat: 2–4 vs. (Scotland) Rangers, 7 June 1984 at Adamstown Oval, Newcastle

== Player records ==
=== Most appearances ===
Rank	Name	Caps	Goals	Years
1	Jim Patikas	9	0	1984–1985
2	Steve Blair	7	1	1984
2	Tony Henderson	7	0	1984
2	Mike O'Shea	7	0	1984
5	Charlie Egan	6	1	1984
5	Peter Katholos	6	0	1984
5	Peter Lewis	6	0	1984
5	Richard Miranda	6	0	1984–1985
5	John O'Shea	6	0	1984

=== Goalscorers ===
Rank	Name	Caps	Goals	Years
1	Doug Brown	5	2	1984
2	Graham Arnold	2	1	1985
2	Steve Blair	7	1	1984
2	Charlie Egan	6	1	1984
2	Tom McCulloch	3	1	1984–1985
2	Mike Petersen	2	1	1985
2	Paul Wade	2	1	1985

== Managers ==
- (Scotland) Eddie Thomson 1984
- (Australia) John Margaritis 1985
