= 1983 SASF season =

77th season of soccer in South Australia

South Australian Soccer Federation
- Season: 1983
- Dates: ?–1 October
- Matches: 403
- Goals: 1,283 (3.18 per match)

The 1983 South Australian Soccer Federation season was the 77th season of soccer in South Australia and the 22nd to be run by the South Australian Soccer Federation since its reformation in 1962.

== Changes from 1982 ==
=== Promotion and relegation ===
1982 League	Promoted to league	Relegated from league
Division One	West Adelaide Youth	Noarlunga United
Division Two	Blackwood	Thebarton Asteras
Metropolitan League	Athelstone	—

=== Team changes ===
- Windsor Athletic changed their name to Windsor Melita.
- Noarlunga City merged into Seaford, who became Seaford-Noarlunga.

== Men's competitions ==
=== 1983 SASF Division One ===
SASF Division One
- Season: 1983
- Dates: 23 April–3 September
- Champions: Beograd Woodville (2nd title)
- Matches: 90
- Goals: 271 (3.01 per match)
- Best Player: Jan Kierno (Polonia Adelaide)
- Top goalscorer: Gary Price, Dusan Rusmir (12 goals)
- Biggest home win: Polonia Adelaide 7–0 Port Adelaide (25 June)
- Biggest away win: Campbelltown City 0–9 Beograd Woodville (28 May)
- Highest scoring: Campbelltown City 0–9 Beograd Woodville (28 May)

The 1983 SASF Division One season, known as the Rothmans First Division for sponsorship reasons, was the 77th season of first division soccer in South Australia.

Beograd Woodville were champions for the second time. No teams were relegated as the first division increased to 12 teams for 1984.

==== League table ====
Pos	Team	Pld	W	D	L	GF	GA	GD	Pts	Qualification
1	Beograd Woodville (C)	18	10	3	5	41	21	+20	23	Qualification for Top Four Cup and Ampol Cup
2	Adelaide Croatia	18	10	3	5	29	22	+7	23	Qualification for Top Four Cup and Ampol Cup
3	Polonia Adelaide	18	9	4	5	33	20	+13	22	Qualification for Top Four Cup and Ampol Cup
4	Para Hills	18	8	6	4	29	19	+10	22	Qualification for Top Four Cup and Ampol Cup
5	West Adelaide Youth	18	8	5	5	33	23	+10	21	Qualification for Ampol Cup
6	Eastern Districts Azzurri	18	7	6	5	23	16	+7	20	Qualification for Ampol Cup
7	West Torrens Birkalla	18	6	5	7	28	31	−3	17	
8	Campbelltown City	18	4	6	8	23	44	−21	14	
9	Elizabeth City	18	4	4	10	18	30	−12	12	
10	Port Adelaide	18	1	4	13	14	45	−31	6	

Source: Socceraust
Rules for classification: 1) points; 2) goal difference; 3) number of goals scored.
(C) Champions

==== Results ====
Home \ Away	CRO	BEO	CAM	EDA	ELI	PAR	POL	POR	WES	WTB
Adelaide Croatia		0–1	0–1	2–2	4–2	0–1	1–0	2–1	2–0	1–0
Beograd Woodville	2–0		2–1	1–1	4–1	4–3	1–2	6–1	1–3	3–1
Campbelltown City	2–2	0–9		1–2	1–4	0–0	0–4	2–2	2–5	1–1
Eastern Districts Azzurri	4–1	0–2	1–2		0–1	1–1	1–1	2–1	0–0	3–0
Elizabeth City	1–2	0–2	0–0	0–1		0–2	0–1	0–0	0–5	1–1
Para Hills	1–2	3–0	3–4	1–1	1–0		3–1	4–1	1–1	1–0
Polonia Adelaide	0–1	1–1	0–0	0–2	2–1	0–0		7–0	2–0	5–1
Port Adelaide	0–3	2–1	2–3	0–2	1–3	0–1	1–2		0–2	0–3
West Adelaide Youth	1–3	1–0	3–1	1–0	2–2	1–1	3–4	1–1		2–3
West Torrens Birkalla	3–3	1–1	4–2	1–0	1–2	3–2	4–1	1–1	0–2	

Source: Socceraust
Legend: Blue = home team win; Yellow = draw; Red = away team win.

==== Top scorers ====
Rank	Player	Club	Goals
1	Gary Price	Adelaide Croatia	12
1	Dusan Ramir	Beograd Woodville	12

=== 1983 SASF Division Two ===
SASF Division Two
- Season: 1983
- Dates: 2 April–10 September
- Champions: Salisbury United (1st title)
- Promoted: Adelaide City Youth; Salisbury United
- Matches: 132
- Goals: 424 (3.21 per match)
- Best Player: Aldo Raponi (Blackwood)
- Biggest home win: Adelaide City Youth 8–0 Enfield-Victoria (28 May)
- Biggest away win: Brighton City 0–6 Salisbury United (25 June); Modbury 0–6 Salisbury United (27 August)
- Highest scoring: West Fields APAC 8–2 Brighton City (16 July)

The 1983 SASF Division Two season, known as the Rothmans Second Division for sponsorship reasons, was the 60th season of second division soccer in South Australia.

Salisbury United were champions for the first time and were promoted with Adelaide City Youth. No teams were relegated as the Metropolitan League disbanded at the end of the season. Sturt withdrew from SASF competitions after the season.

==== League table ====
Pos	Team	Pld	W	D	L	GF	GA	GD	Pts	Promotion or qualification
1	Salisbury United (C, P)	22	18	3	1	55	7	+48	39	Promotion to SASF Division One and qualification for Ampol Cup
2	Adelaide City Youth (P)	22	14	3	5	56	26	+30	31	Promotion to SASF Division One and qualification for Ampol Cup
3	Cumberland United	22	13	5	4	40	19	+21	31	
4	West Fields APAC	22	11	5	6	55	30	+25	27	
5	USC Lion-Grange	22	11	5	6	46	23	+23	27	
6	Modbury	22	9	3	10	25	38	−13	21	
7	Whyalla City	22	7	5	10	31	40	−9	19	
8	Noarlunga United	22	7	5	10	32	47	−15	19	
9	Sturt	22	4	10	8	23	32	−9	18	Withdrew at end of season
10	Brighton City	22	4	5	13	28	67	−39	13	
11	Blackwood	22	4	3	15	20	41	−21	11	
12	Enfield-Victoria	22	2	4	16	13	54	−41	8	

Source: Socceraust
Rules for classification: 1) points; 2) goal difference; 3) number of goals scored.
(C) Champions; (P) Promoted

==== Results ====
Home \ Away	ACI	BLA	BRI	CMB	ENF	MOD	NOA	SAL	STU	USC	WEF	WHY
Adelaide City Youth		3–1	5–1	3–1	8–0	1–2	6–1	1–3	1–1	1–0	2–1	1–1
Blackwood	1–2		2–3	0–2	2–0	1–0	1–0	0–1	0–2	0–2	3–3	0–2
Brighton City	1–3	1–5		0–2	2–1	4–2	2–2	0–6	1–1	1–3	2–2	3–1
Cumberland United	1–2	1–0	4–1		3–0	0–0	3–1	0–1	0–0	0–0	2–2	1–0
Enfield-Victoria	0–5	1–1	4–2	0–2		0–1	1–2	0–3	1–1	1–6	0–3	2–1
Modbury	0–1	0–0	3–0	0–5	2–0		5–2	0–6	2–1	1–6	2–1	3–0
Noarlunga United	1–4	1–0	1–1	0–2	1–1	3–0		0–3	3–0	3–2	1–1	2–1
Salisbury United	2–0	7–0	4–0	0–1	1–0	3–1	1–0		3–1	1–0	1–0	3–0
Sturt	4–2	2–1	0–0	4–4	0–0	1–0	2–3	0–3		0–0	1–3	0–1
USC Lion-Grange	1–1	3–1	4–0	4–1	3–1	3–0	2–0	0–0	1–1		1–3	2–0
West Fields APAC	2–1	3–0	8–2	0–2	3–0	0–1	6–2	1–1	2–0	4–1		6–3
Whyalla City	1–3	3–1	3–1	1–3	2–0	0–0	3–3	2–2	1–1	3–2	2–1	

Source: Socceraust
Legend: Blue = home team win; Yellow = draw; Red = away team win.

=== 1983 SASF Metropolitan League ===
SASF Metropolitan League
- Season: 1983
- Champions: Windsor Melita (3rd title)
- Promoted: Athelstone; Seaford-Noarlunga; Thebarton Asteras; Windsor Athletic
- Matches: 132
- Goals: 434 (3.29 per match)

The 1983 SASF Metropolitan League season, known as the Rothmans Metropolitan League for sponsorship reasons, was the 41st season of third division soccer in South Australia.

Windsor Melita were champions for the third time and were promoted with Athelstone, Seaford-Noarlunga and Thebarton Asteras. All other teams withdrew from SASF competitions due to the disbandment of the competition.

==== League table ====
Pos	Team	Pld	W	D	L	GF	GA	GD	Pts	Promotion
1	Windsor Melita (C, P)	22	20	1	1	58	15	+43	41	Promotion to SASF Division Two
2	Thebarton Asteras (P)	22	14	4	4	54	29	+25	32	Promotion to SASF Division Two
3	Athelstone (P)	22	12	4	6	56	39	+17	28	Promotion to SASF Division Two
4	South Adelaide	22	12	3	7	34	30	+4	27	Withdrew at end of season
5	Agua	22	11	4	7	39	28	+11	26	Withdrew at end of season
6	Veneto	22	11	3	8	35	30	+5	25	Withdrew at end of season
7	Seaford-Noarlunga (P)	22	10	4	8	42	27	+15	24	Promotion to SASF Division Two
8	Adelaide University	22	8	7	7	35	35	0	23	Withdrew at end of season
9	S.A.I.T.	22	6	3	13	19	43	−24	15	Withdrew at end of season
10	Adelaide Milan	22	4	2	16	19	52	−33	10	Withdrew at end of season
11	Flinders University	22	3	2	17	29	48	−19	8	Withdrew at end of season
12	Dinamo	22	1	3	18	14	58	−44	5	Withdrew at end of season

Source: Socceraust
Rules for classification: 1) points; 2) goal difference; 3) number of goals scored.
(C) Champions; (P) Promoted

== Cup competitions ==
=== 1983 Federation Cup ===
1983 P.G.H. Cup
Tournament details
- Dates: 14 May–17 September
- Teams: 32

Final positions
- Champions: Beograd Woodville (2nd title)
- Runners-up: Salisbury United

Tournament statistics
- Matches played: 31
- Goals scored: 105 (3.39 per match)

The 1983 SASF Federation Cup, known as the P.G.H. Cup for sponsorship reasons, was the 71st running of the Federation Cup, the main soccer knockout cup competition in South Australia.

Beograd Woodville were champions for the second time, defeating Salisbury United 1–0 in the final. Adelaide Croatia were the defending champions, losing 0–2 in the second round to Para Hills.

==== Schedule ====
Round	Match dates	No. of fixtures	Teams	New entries this round
First round	14 May	16	32 → 16	32
Second round	11 June	8	16 → 8	None
Quarter-finals	9 July	4	8 → 4	None
Semi-finals	10 September	2	4 → 2	None
Final	17 September	1	2 → 1	None

==== Bracket ====
First round
Eastern Districts Azzurri	2
Campbelltown City	0
Adelaide City Youth	1
Veneto	0
West Adelaide Youth	3
West Fields APAC	1
Beograd Woodville	3
Cumberland United	0
Modbury Jets	4
Campbelltown	0
Parafield Gardens	4
Elizabeth Vale	0
Para Hills	2
Tea Tree Gully	1
Adelaide Croatia	6
Brighton City	2
Elizabeth City	3
Port Adelaide	1
Adelaide Omonia	3
Agua	0
Mount Gambier Inter	1
Rostrevor Old Collegians	0
Polonia Adelaide	2
West Torrens Birkalla	0
Sturt	3
Blackwood	0
Whyalla City	1
USC Lion-Grange	0
Salisbury United	3
Noarlunga United	1
Elizabeth Downs	3
Adelaide University	0

Second round
Eastern Districts Azzurri	4
Adelaide City Youth	2
West Adelaide Youth	2 (9)
Beograd Woodville (p)	2 (10)
Modbury	2
Parafield Gardens	0
Para Hills	2
Adelaide Croatia	0
Elizabeth City	2
Adelaide Omonia	1
Mount Gambier Inter	0
Polonia Adelaide	5
Sturt	4
Whyalla City	2
Salisbury United	7
Elizabeth Downs	1

Quarter-finals
Eastern Districts Azzurri	2
Beograd Woodville (a.e.t.)	3
Modbury	2
Para Hills	1
Elizabeth City	1
Polonia Adelaide	2
Sturt	0
Salisbury United	1

Semi-finals
Beograd Woodville	3
Modbury	1
Polonia Adelaide	0
Salisbury United	2

Final
17 September – Hindmarsh
Beograd Woodville	1
Salisbury United	0

=== 1983 Night Series ===
1983 Ampol Cup
Tournament details
- Dates: ?–23 March
- Teams: 8

Final positions
- Champions: Eastern Districts Azzurri (1st title)
- Runners-up: Adelaide City Youth

Tournament statistics
- Matches played: 15
- Goals scored: 40 (2.67 per match)

The 1983 Night Series, known as the Ampol Cup for sponsorship reasons, was the 31st running of the Night Series, a pre-season cup competition contested by the top six teams from the previous season's first division and the two newly promoted teams from the second division.

Eastern Districts Azzurri were champions for the first time, defeating Adelaide City Youth 1–0 in the final. West Adelaide Youth were the defending champions, losing 1–2 in the semi-finals to the eventual winners, Eastern Districts Azzurri.

==== Group stage ====
The top two teams from both groups advance to the semi-finals.

===== Group A =====
Pos	Team	Pld	W	D	L	GF	GA	GD	Pts	Qualification	WES	POL	CRO	PAR
1	West Adelaide Youth	3	2	1	0	4	2	+2	5	Advance to Semi-finals		2–1	1–0	1–1
2	Polonia Adelaide	3	1	1	1	6	3	+3	3	Advance to Semi-finals			0–0	5–1
3	Adelaide Croatia	3	1	1	1	2	1	+1	3					2–0
4	Para Hills	3	0	1	2	2	8	−6	1					

Source: Socceraust
Rules for classification: 1) points; 2) goal difference; 3) number of goals scored.

===== Group B =====
Pos	Team	Pld	W	D	L	GF	GA	GD	Pts	Qualification	ACI	EDA	CAM	BEO
1	Adelaide City Youth	3	3	0	0	9	1	+8	6	Advance to Semi-finals		3–1	2–0	4–0
2	Eastern Districts Azzurri	3	2	0	1	7	4	+3	4	Advance to Semi-finals			4–0	2–1
3	Campbelltown City	3	1	0	2	1	6	−5	2					1–0
4	Beograd Woodville	3	0	0	3	1	7	−6	0					

Source: Socceraust
Rules for classification: 1) points; 2) goal difference; 3) number of goals scored.

==== Knockout stage ====
Semi-finals
West Adelaide Youth	1
Eastern Districts Azzurri	2
Adelaide City Youth	3
Polonia Adelaide	1

Final
Eastern Districts Azzurri	1
Adelaide City Youth	0

=== 1983 Top Four Cup ===
1983 Coca-Cola Cup
Tournament details
- Dates: 24 September–1 October
- Teams: 4

Final positions
- Champions: Polonia Adelaide (3rd title)
- Runners-up: Adelaide Croatia

Tournament statistics
- Matches played: 3
- Goals scored: 9 (3 per match)

The 1983 Top Four Cup, known as the Coca-Cola Cup for sponsorship reasons, was the 14th running of the Top Four Cup, a post-season cup competition contested by the top four teams from the first division.

Polonia Adelaide were champions for the third time, defeating Adelaide Croatia 3–1 in the final. Eastern Districts Azzurri were the previous winners, but did not qualify for this season's competition after finishing sixth.

==== Bracket ====
Semi-finals
Adelaide Croatia	2
Para Hills	1
Beograd Woodville	0
Polonia Adelaide	2

Final
Adelaide Croatia	1
Polonia Adelaide	3
