= List of Penrith City SC players =

Penrith City Soccer Club, an association football club based in Penrith, Sydney, was founded in 1984 as the Penrith Panthers Rugby League Club. They were admitted into the National Soccer League for the 1984 season and was taken over by a Uruguayan consortium and being renamed Penrith Uruguayan. This last incarnation lasted until 1989, when the club became defunct.

Peter Brogan held the record for the greatest number of appearances for Penrith City. Between 1984 and 1985, the Australian defender played 54 times for the club. Three other players made 50 or more appearances for Penrith City. The club's goalscoring record was held by Brian Jackson and Ian Wotherspoon, who scored nine goals in all competitions.

== Key ==
- The list is ordered first by date of debut, and then if necessary in alphabetical order.
- Appearances as a substitute are included.

Positions key
GK	Goalkeeper
DF	Defender
MF	Midfielder
FW	Forward

Nationality
Unless otherwise noted, the nationality of a player is determined by the country/countries which he has played for, or if said person has not played international football, their country of birth.
Club career
Club career is defined as the first and last calendar years in which the player appeared for the club in any of the competitions listed below.
Total appearances and Total goals
Total appearances and goals comprise those in the National Soccer League and NSL Cup

== Players ==
List of Penrith City SC players
Player	Nationality	Pos	Club career	Starts	Subs	Total	Goals
Player	Nationality	Pos	Club career	Appearances			Goals
Peter Brogan	Australia	DF	1984–1985	54	0	54	0
Dennis Colusso	Australia	GK	1984	2	5	7	1
Roy Cotton	England	MF	1984	29	0	29	8
Mike Cross	England	GK	1984–1985	47	1	48	0
Paul Daley	Australia	DF	1984	27	2	29	0
David Fitzharris	England	MF	1984	19	5	24	1
Mike Gibson	Australia	GK	1984–1985	51	0	51	0
Ian Hunter	Australia	FW	1984–1985	41	10	51	4
Brian Jackson	England	FW	1984–1985	43	2	45	9
Ken Lindsay	Australia	FW	1984	7	1	8	0
David McIntosh	Australia	DF	1984–1985	37	0	37	1
Ian Wotherspoon	Australia	MF	1984–1985	46	4	50	9
David Hale	Australia	DF	1984	21	5	26	3
Peter Freeman	Australia	GK	1984	4	0	4	0
Jeff Ainsworth	England	DF	1984–1985	40	1	41	3
Don Campbell	Australia	DF	1984–1985	31	1	32	2
Peter Nix	England	MF	1984	11	2	13	1
Randall Easthorpe	Australia	MF	1984	24	13	37	8
David Carbone	Australia	–	1985	3	2	5	0
G. Lowe	Australia	–	1985	0	1	1	0
David Shute	Australia	FW	1985	0	6	6	0
Rene Licata	Australia	FW	1985	19	3	22	3
Mike Toohey	Australia	DF	1985	14	6	20	0
Bobby Hebb	England	MF	1985	18	1	19	0
Peter Jones	Australia	–	1985	13	1	14	3
