= List of Preston Lions FC players =

Below is a list of Preston Lions FC players both past and present, ordered alphabetically.

== A ==
- (Australia) Lupce Acevski
- (Australia) Nicolas Alvarez
- (Australia) Les Anastasiou

== B ==
- (Australia) Antony Burlak
- (Australia) Michael Burlak

== C ==
- (Scotland) George Campbell (footballer)
- (Australia) Frank Catalano
- (Australia) Ricky Chillico
- (Australia) Oscar Crino

== D ==
- (Scotland) Ian Dobson
- (Australia) Robbie Dunn
- (Australia) Pece Dimovski
- (Australia) Zoran Drogriski

== E ==
- (Australia) Isyan Erdogan
- (Australia) Chris Emsovski

== G ==
- (Australia) Marinos Gasparis
- (North Macedonia) Blaze Georgioski
- (North Macedonia) Goce Gruevski
- (Turkey) Ersan Gülüm

== J ==
- (Australia) Steve Jackson
- (Australia) George Jolevski

== K ==
- (Australia) Igor Kolevski

== L ==
- (Australia) Nick Lazarevski
- (Australia) John Little
- (Australia) Goran Lozanovski

== M ==
- (Scotland) George McMillan
- (Australia) Anthony Magnacca
- (Australia) John Markovski
- (Australia) Stephen Masalkovski
- (Australia) Hrvoje Matkovic
- (Australia) Bale Micovski
- (Australia) Daniel Miller
- (Australia) Michael Miskas
- (Australia) Jonathan Munoz

== N ==
- (Australia) Robert Najdovski
- (North Macedonia) Spase Najdovski
- (Australia) Nikola Naumovski

== O ==
- (Australia) Sasa Ognenovski
- (Australia) Peter Ollerton
- (Australia) Serkan Oksuz
- (Australia) Savas Ozdemir

== P ==
- (Australia) Steven Pace
- (Australia) Zoran Petrevski
- (Australia) Serdar Pir
- (Australia) Victor Pittito
- (England) James Poole

== S ==
- (Australia) John Sapazovski
- (Australia) Nicholas Schwal
- (Australia) Ryan Scott
- (Australia) Naum Sekulovski
- (Australia) Pece Siveski
- (Australia) Robert Spasevski
- (Australia) Warren Spink
- (Australia) Wayne Spiteri
- (Australia) Tony Sterjovski
- (Australia) Aleksandar Stojanovski
- (Australia) Robert Stojcevski

== T ==
- (North Macedonia) Gjorgji Todorovski
- (Australia) Phil Traianedes
- (Australia) Kris Trajanovski
- (Australia) Vasco Trpcevski

== V ==
- (Australia) Haris Vrbovac

== Z ==
- (Australia) Andrew Zinni
