= Tom McCulloch =

Australian soccer player and coach

Personal information
- Date of birth: 10 February 1964 (age 62)
- Position: Defender

Senior career*
Years	Team	Apps	(Gls)
1982–1984	Marconi Stallions	64	(14)
1985	APIA Leichhardt	16	(2)
1986	Sydney City	12	(2)
1987–1995	Marconi Stallions	192	(29)
Total		284	(47)

International career
1984–1985	Australia B	3	(1)
1985–1992	Australia	14	(1)

Managerial career
- 2002–2003: Hajduk Wanderers
- 2003–2004: Marconi Stallions
- * Club domestic league appearances and goals

Tom McCulloch (born 10 February 1964) is an Australian former soccer player and coach. McCulloch played at both professional and international levels as a defender.

== Career ==
=== Playing career ===
McCulloch played club football for Marconi Stallions, APIA Leichhardt and Sydney City. His is Marconi's all-time NSL appearance holder.

He also made 14 official international appearances for Australia, scoring one goal, between 1985 and 1992. He had previously competed at the 1983 FIFA World Youth Championship.

=== Coaching career ===
After retiring as a player, McCulloch coached Hajduk Wanderers and Marconi Stallions.

=== Teaching career ===
As of 2010, Tom McCulloch has been teaching at Chifley College Shalvey Campus as a PDHPE/Sport teacher.

== Honours ==
Marconi

- NSL Championship: 1988, 1989,
