= Duggie Brown (soccer) =

Australian footballer (born 1958)

Personal information
- Full name: Douglas Alexander Brown
- Date of birth: 21 March 1958 (age 68)
- Place of birth: Poole, Dorset, England
- Height: 5 ft 9 in (1.75 m)
- Position: Forward

Youth career
- Airdrie Academicals
- Chapel Hill BC

Senior career*
Years	Team	Apps	(Gls)
1976–1978	Aberdeen	0	(0)
1978–1979	Clydebank	12	(1)
1979–1980	Sheffield United	25	(2)
1980–1981	Stranraer	7	(2)
1981–1983	Preston Makedonia	53	(18)
1983–1986	South Melbourne	86	(48)
1986–1987	Heidelberg United	13	(7)
1987–1988	Fawkner	46	(22)

International career
1984	Australia B	5	(2)
- * Club domestic league appearances and goals

Douglas Alexander Brown (born 21 March 1958) is a former footballer who played as a forward for Sheffield United. Born in England, he played for the Australia B national team.

Born in Poole in Dorset, Brown started his career in Scotland where he was signed by Aberdeen on 16 July 1976 but failed to make the breakthrough into the first team. On 17 May 1978 he moved to Clydebank for a short spell before being signed by English side Sheffield United on 2 March 1979, making his league debut the following day in a 1–1 draw against Oldham Athletic.

Described by the press as an 'enthusiastic' player Brown was unable to establish himself as a first team player and eventually left United in October 1980 after playing 31 games in total and scoring five goals.

Following his departure from United, Brown returned to his former trade as an engineering fitter. Brown worked for his father, George Brown, who was a building sub-contractor. George Brown had also been a Football League player, with Southport and Bradford Park Avenue.

Brown later emigrated to Australia, signing with local giants South Melbourne Hellas in the National Soccer League. In four seasons at the club, he established himself as one of its greatest ever figures, twice finishing as the league's highest scorer and leading the club to the 1984 championship. He has been honoured as a nominee in the club's Hall of Champions.

== Honours ==
=== Club ===
Domestic with South Melbourne

- National Soccer League

Champions: 1984
Conference Winners: 1984, 1985

- Buffalo Gold Cup

Winners: 1984

- Hellenic Cup

Winners: 1984

=== Individual ===
National Soccer League Top Goalscorer

- 1983 – 16 goals
- 1984 – 22 goals

Preston Makedonia Top Goalscorer

- 1982 – 11 goals

Fawkner Top Goalscorer

- 1987 – 14 goals
- 1988 – 8 goals

Australia B Leading Goalscorer

- 1984 – 2 goals

== Career statistics ==
=== Club ===
Appearances and goals by club, season and competition
Club	Season	League (Note: Includes NSL Conference and Championship play-offs)			National Cup (Note: Includes FA Cup, Scottish Cup, and NSL Cup.)		Other (Note: Includes League Cup, Scottish League Cup, Anglo-Scottish Cup, Ampol Cup, Buffalo Gold Cup, Hellenic Cup, Buffalo Cup, Dockerty Cup, and Victorian State League Cup.)		Total	
Club	Season	Division	Apps	Goals	Apps	Goals	Apps	Goals	Apps	Goals
Aberdeen	1976–77	Scottish Premier Division	0	0	0	0	0	0	0	0
Aberdeen	1977–78	Scottish Premier Division	0	0	0	0	0	0	0	0
Aberdeen	Total		0	0	0	0	0	0	0	0
Clydebank	1978–79	Scottish First Division	12	1	3	1	2	0	17	2
Sheffield United	1978–79	English Second Division	9	1	0	0	0	0	9	1
Sheffield United	1979–80	English Third Division	16	1	0	0	6	3	22	4
Sheffield United	Total		25	2	0	0	6	3	31	5
Stranraer	1980–81	Scottish Second Division	7	2	2	1	0	0	9	3
Preston Makedonia	1981	National Soccer League	25	7	2	1	0	0	27	8
Preston Makedonia	1982	National Soccer League	28	11	2	0	3	1	31	12
Preston Makedonia	1983	National Soccer League	0	0	0	0	3	1	3	1
Preston Makedonia	Total		53	18	4	1	6	2	63	21
South Melbourne	1983	National Soccer League	28	16	3	3	0	0	31	19
South Melbourne	1984	National Soccer League	32	22	0	0	5	2	37	24
South Melbourne	1985	National Soccer League	23	10	1	0	5	1	29	11
South Melbourne	1986	National Soccer League	3	0	1	3	4	0	8	3
South Melbourne	Total		86	48	5	6	14	3	105	57
Heidelberg United	1986	National Soccer League	12	7	0	0	0	0	12	7
Heidelberg United	1987	National Soccer League	1	0	0	0	5	2	6	2
Heidelberg United	Total		13	7	0	0	5	2	18	9
Fawkner	1987	Victorian State League	22	14	0	0	4	5	26	19
Fawkner	1988	Victorian State League	24	8	0	0	2	1	26	9
Fawkner	Total		46	22	0	0	6	6	52	28
Career total			242	100	14	9	39	16	295	125

=== International ===
Australia B
Year	Apps	Goals
1984	5	2
Total	5	2

==== International goals ====
Scores and results list Australia B's goal tally first.

#	Date	Venue	Opponent	Score	Result	Competition
1.	7 June 1984	Adamstown Oval, Newcastle	(Scotland) Rangers	2–4	2–4	Friendly
2.	17 June 1984	Melbourne Cricket Ground, Melbourne	(Greece) Iraklis	1–1	1–1	Friendly
