= Kur Kur =

South Sudanese association football player

Kur Gai Kur
Personal information
- Full name: Kur Gai Kur
- Date of birth: 20 February 2000 (age 26)
- Place of birth: Mombasa, Kenya
- Height: 1.88 m (6 ft 2 in)
- Position: Midfielder

Team information
- Current team: Preston Lions
- Number: 77

Youth career
- 2008–2009: Modbury Vista
- 2009–2016: Skillaroos
- 2016–2020: Modbury

Senior career*
| Years | Team | Apps | (Gls) |
| 2020 | Modbury | 7 | (1) |
| 2020–2021 | Croydon Kings | 8 | (2) |
| 2021–2022 | Adelaide City | 32 | (16) |
| 2022–2023 | FK Novi Pazar | 0 | (0) |
| 2023–2024 | Brisbane Roar NPL | 5 | (1) |
| 2024–2025 | Avondale FC | 47 | (14) |
| 2025–2026 | Green Gully | 23 | (3) |
| 2026– | Preston Lions | 0 | (0) |

International career^{‡}
| 2023– | South Sudan | 1 | (0) |
- * Club domestic league appearances and goals as of 20 September 2026 ‡ National team caps and goals as of 8 May 2023

Kur Gai Kur (born 20 February 2000) is a South Sudanese professional football player who plays as a midfielder for Preston Lions in the Australian Championship.

He has also been called up for the South Sudan national team.

== Club career ==
Kur was born in a refugee camp in Kenya. At the age of two, together with his family he moved to Australia for a better life. He began his football career at Modbury Vista when he was a very young, before joining the Skillaroos program, until he turned 16. He then signed to Modbury before joining the Croydon Kings in 2020. He transferred to Adelaide City in 2021, where he began his senior career.

In 2022 Kur move to Europe at Serbia top flight team FK Novi Pazar and years later return to Australia join with Brisbane Roar NPL team.

In 2026 Kur joins the Preston Lions soccer team who he currently plays for.

== International career ==
Kur made his debut with the South Sudan national team in a friendly match against the national team of Jordan, on January 31, 2022.
