= Darren Stewart (soccer) =

Australian soccer player (1966–2018)

Personal information
- Full name: Darren Stewart
- Date of birth: 17 May 1966
- Place of birth: Newcastle, New South Wales
- Date of death: 18 October 2018 (aged 52)
- Place of death: Singapore
- Position: Defender

Youth career
- Toronto
- Awaba
- Newcastle KB United

Senior career*
Years	Team	Apps	(Gls)
1982–1986	Newcastle Rosebud	16	(5)
1986–1992	APIA Leichhardt	120	(6)
1992–1993	Newcastle Breakers	23	(4)
1993–1998	Johor FA	244	(38)
1993–1994	→ Newcastle Breakers (loan)	11	(0)
1995–1996	→ Newcastle Breakers (loan)	9	(1)
1998–2001	Balestier Central	33	(7)
Total		456	(61)

International career
1992	Australia	3	(0)

Managerial career
- 2003–2004: Balestier Khalsa(youth)
- 2004–2005: Geylang International (youth)
- 2005–2006: Geylang International (assistant)
- 2008–2011: Gombak United
- 2012–2013: Balestier Khalsa
- 2014–2015: Woodlands Wellington
- 2016–2018: Maldives
- * Club domestic league appearances and goals

Darren Stewart (17 May 1966 – 18 October 2018) was an Australian soccer player who played in the Australian, Malaysian and Singaporean national leagues before becoming a coach active in Singapore and managing the Maldives. He represented Australia three times in 1992.

== Playing career ==
=== Club career ===
A defender, Stewart was a former notable player for APIA Leichhardt, Newcastle Breakers and Johor FA where he captained and won the Malaysia FA Cup in 1998.

He moved to Singapore in 1999, where he played for Balestier Central FC from 1999 to 2002. In 2002, he retired from playing football.

=== International career ===
Stewart was an Australia national football team player from 1991 to 1993.

== Coaching career ==
He was the assistant manager for Balestier Khalsa's Prime League team in 2003 and assistant manager for the Geylang United team in 2004–2005.

He lived in Singapore where he coached and managed the Elias Park Football Club and was a coach for Little League Pte Ltd.

Stewart was named as head coach for Gombak United at the start of the 2009 S.League season. He joined the club as a technical analyst in late 2008.

In January 2012, Stewart was confirmed as Balestier Khalsa's head coach for the season 2012 S.League campaign. His time at Balestier were successful, as he guided the club to win the 2013 Singapore League Cup and 6th and 4th placings in the 2012 and 2013 league seasons respectively, the best positions by the club since merging from Balestier Central and Clementi Khalsa. However his contract was not renewed at the end of 2013. Stewart was then contracted to Woodlands Wellington at the start of 2014. Initially Stewart were successful, with 5-game unbeaten streak in the league and interest from hometown club Newcastle United Jets to be their head coach, which Stewart turns down to stay with the Singapore club. But after a string of poor results, culminating in a 7–1 thrashing at the hands of Albirex Niigata (S) in June, Stewart resigned from his position at the club.

In July 2016, Stewart was appointed head coach of the Maldives national team.

== Death and legacy ==
Stewart died in Singapore on 18 October 2018 at the age of 52. In 2020, the Darren Stewart Cup, an annual tournament involving teams that Stewart represented was started.

== Honours ==
=== As manager ===
==== Balestier Khalsa ====
- 2012 Singapore League Cup Plate final
- 2013 Singapore League Cup
