= 1985 National Soccer League =

Australian soccer season

National Soccer League
- Season: 1985
- Dates: 9 March – 8 September 1985
- Champions: Brunswick Juventus; 1st title
- Premiers: Sydney City (Northern); South Melbourne (Southern)
- Relegated: Penrith City
- Matches: 276
- Goals: 769 (2.79 per match)
- Top goalscorer: Charlie Egan (21 goals)
- Biggest home win: Marconi Fairfield 6–0 Penrith City (28 July 1985)
- Biggest away win: APIA Leichhardt 0–4 Sydney City (17 March 1985)
- Highest scoring: Brunswick Juventus 5–4 Brisbane City (19 May 1985)

The 1985 National Soccer League was the ninth season of the National Soccer League. The season was again played with two Conferences as separate leagues, followed by a conference playoff final. The Grand Final was won by Brunswick Juventus 2–0 on aggregate over Sydney City. The season began on 9 March 1985, and concluded on 8 September 1985. The league was known as the Olympic Airways Soccer League under a sponsorship arrangement with Greek airline Olympic Airways.

== Teams ==
Twenty-four teams competed in the league (twelve in the Northern Conference and twelve in the Southern Conference) – the sixteen teams from the previous season and eight teams accepted from their respective state leagues.

=== Stadiums and locations ===
Note: Table lists in alphabetical order by conference.

Team	Location	Stadium	Capacity
Northern Conference
APIA Leichhardt	Sydney (Leichhardt)	Lambert Park	7,000
Blacktown City	Sydney (Seven Hills)	Gabbie Stadium	5,000
Canberra City	Canberra	Canberra Stadium	25,011
Inter Monaro	Queanbeyan	Seiffert Oval	15,000
Marconi Fairfield	Sydney (Bossley Park)	Marconi Stadium	9,000
Newcastle Rosebud United	Newcastle	Adamstown Oval	2,000
Penrith City	Penrith	Cook Park	1,000
St George-Budapest	Sydney (Mortdale)	St George Stadium	12,000
Sydney City	Sydney (Bondi)	ES Marks Athletics Field	8,000
Sydney Croatia	Sydney (Edensor Park)	King Tomislav Park	10,000
Sydney Olympic	Sydney (Waterloo)	Pratten Park	15,000
Wollongong City	Wollongong	Wollongong Showground	22,000
Southern Conference
Adelaide City	Adelaide (Kensington)	Olympic Sports Field	8,000
Brisbane City	Brisbane (Newmarket)	Spencer Park	5,000
Brisbane Lions	Brisbane (Inala)	Lions Stadium	5,000
Brunswick Juventus	Melbourne (Brunswick)	Olympic Park No. 2	6,000
Footscray JUST	Melbourne (Footscray)	Schintler Reserve	?
Green Gully	Melbourne (St Albans)	Green Gully Reserve	10,000
Heidelberg United	Melbourne (Brunswick)	Olympic Village	12,000
Melbourne Croatia	Melbourne (Essendon)	Olympic Park	18,500
Preston Makedonia	Melbourne (Fitzroy)	B.T. Connor Reserve	5,000
South Melbourne	Melbourne (Middle Park)	Middle Park	18,000
Sunshine George Cross	Melbourne (City of Melbourne)	Chaplin Reserve	5,000
West Adelaide	Adelaide (City of Adelaide)	Hindmarsh Stadium	16,500

=== Head coach changes ===
The Australian Soccer Annual 1985 reported seven managerial changes.

Team	Outgoing head coach	Date of vacancy	Position in the table	Incoming head coach	Date of appointment
Adelaide City	(England) Frank Pimblett	1985	Pre-season	(Australia) Tony Lowndes	1985
Brunswick Juventus	(Australia) John Margaritis	1985	Pre-season	(Scotland) Tommy Traynor	1985
Inter Monaro	—	1985	Pre-season	(Australia) Josef Procop	1985
Melbourne Croatia	(Australia) Tony Vrzina	1985	Pre-season	(Australia) Tommy Cumming	1985
Preston Makedonia	(Australia) Frank McAleer	1985	Pre-season	(Australia) Willie Murray	1985
Sunshine George Cross	(Scotland) Billy Wilkinson	1985	Pre-season	(Australia) John Gardiner	1985
West Adelaide	(Australia) Sam Salabsides	1985	Pre-season	(Scotland) Neil McGachey	1985

== Regular season ==
=== League tables ===
Northern Conference

Pos	Team	Pld	W	D	L	GF	GA	GD	Pts	Qualification or relegation
1	Sydney City	22	15	5	2	42	19	+23	35	Qualification to Finals series
2	Sydney Croatia	22	14	5	3	50	22	+28	33	Qualification to Finals series
3	Marconi Fairfield	22	11	7	4	44	23	+21	29	Qualification to Finals series
4	Sydney Olympic	22	12	3	7	29	25	+4	27	Qualification to Finals series
5	St George-Budapest	22	7	8	7	31	26	+5	22	Qualification to Finals series
6	Canberra City	22	8	6	8	33	35	−2	22	
7	Inter Monaro	22	7	6	9	29	37	−8	20	
8	Blacktown City	22	7	4	11	30	34	−4	18	
9	APIA Leichhardt	22	7	2	13	20	34	−14	16	
10	Wollongong City	22	5	6	11	29	46	−17	16	
11	Penrith City (R)	22	4	6	12	24	35	−11	14	Relegation to the 1986 NSW State League
12	Newcastle Rosebud United	22	4	4	14	20	45	−25	12	

Source: rsssf.com
Rules for classification: 1) points; 2) goal difference; 3) number of goals scored.
(R) Relegated

Southern Conference

Pos	Team	Pld	W	D	L	GF	GA	GD	Pts	Qualification
1	South Melbourne	22	14	5	3	39	21	+18	33	Qualification to Finals series
2	Brunswick Juventus (C)	22	11	7	4	33	19	+14	29	Qualification to Finals series
3	Heidelberg United	22	10	7	5	29	17	+12	27	Qualification to Finals series
4	Melbourne Croatia	22	9	6	7	29	21	+8	24	Qualification to Finals series
5	Preston Makedonia	22	9	6	7	30	28	+2	24	Qualification to Finals series
6	Sunshine George Cross	22	8	7	7	25	22	+3	23	
7	Brisbane Lions	22	9	4	9	29	29	0	22	
8	Green Gully	22	6	6	10	24	29	−5	18	
9	Adelaide City	22	6	6	10	29	35	−6	18	
10	West Adelaide	22	6	5	11	24	37	−13	17	
11	Brisbane City	22	6	5	11	25	42	−17	17	
12	Footscray JUST	22	5	2	15	25	41	−16	12	

Updated to match(es) played on unknown. Source: rsssf.com
Rules for classification: 1) points; 2) goal difference; 3) number of goals scored.
(C) Champions

=== Results ===
Northern Conference

Home \ Away	API	BLA	CAN	INT	MAR	NRU	PEN	STG	SCI	SCR	SOL	WOL
APIA Leichhardt	—	0–3	0–1	0–1	4–1	1–0	1–0	1–4	0–4	1–3	1–2	4–2
Blacktown City	1–1	—	2–3	1–0	0–2	4–0	1–1	0–3	1–2	1–1	1–0	3–0
Canberra City	0–0	3–2	—	1–2	1–1	3–1	2–2	0–1	1–3	2–4	1–3	1–1
Inter Monaro	0–3	2–1	0–3	—	1–0	1–2	3–1	1–1	2–3	1–1	3–1	1–1
Marconi Fairfield	0–0	2–1	4–1	4–1	—	2–2	6–0	1–0	0–0	0–2	0–0	6–1
Newcastle Rosebud United	2–1	0–3	2–2	1–0	0–2	—	1–1	3–4	1–1	1–2	0–1	1–3
Penrith City	0–1	0–1	1–2	3–4	1–3	4–1	—	0–0	1–2	0–1	0–1	3–0
St George-Budapest	2–0	1–1	1–1	1–1	0–1	3–0	3–2	—	0–1	1–3	0–1	1–1
Sydney City	2–0	3–1	4–2	2–2	1–1	2–0	0–1	1–0	—	2–0	2–1	5–2
Sydney Croatia	3–0	4–0	1–0	2–0	3–3	2–0	2–2	2–2	2–0	—	5–0	5–1
Sydney Olympic	2–1	3–2	0–1	1–1	2–2	2–0	0–1	3–1	0–1	3–1	—	2–0
Wollongong City	1–0	3–0	0–2	4–2	2–3	1–2	0–0	2–2	1–1	2–1	1–2	—

Source: OzFootball
Legend: Blue = home team win; Yellow = draw; Red = away team win.
For upcoming matches, an "a" indicates there is an article about the rivalry between the two participants.

Southern Conference

Home \ Away	ADE	BRC	BRL	BRU	FOO	GRE	HEI	MEL	PRE	SOU	SGC	WES
Adelaide City	—	1–1	1–1	2–1	2–1	1–1	0–1	3–0	1–2	2–2	1–1	4–1
Brisbane City	2–1	—	0–2	0–0	3–2	3–0	0–3	1–1	0–0	2–1	0–1	0–0
Brisbane Lions	3–0	3–0	—	0–0	1–0	3–1	1–2	0–1	1–2	1–1	1–0	1–0
Brunswick Juventus	3–1	5–4	2–1	—	3–2	1–0	2–0	1–1	2–0	2–2	3–0	0–1
Footscray JUST	1–0	1–3	1–2	1–1	—	1–0	3–3	0–2	1–2	0–1	0–3	2–1
Green Gully	2–3	4–1	2–0	0–2	2–1	—	1–1	0–0	1–1	0–1	1–1	1–1
Heidelberg United	0–0	2–0	2–0	1–0	4–0	1–3	—	0–1	0–0	0–1	1–1	1–0
Melbourne Croatia	3–0	4–1	2–3	0–1	0–1	0–2	1–2	—	2–0	1–1	1–1	0–0
Preston Makedonia	4–2	3–0	4–0	0–0	2–0	0–1	1–4	3–2	—	0–1	2–1	1–1
South Melbourne	2–1	4–1	0–0	1–3	3–1	3–2	1–0	1–2	3–0	—	2–1	4–2
Sunshine George Cross	1–2	3–0	3–2	0–0	2–1	2–0	0–0	0–2	2–2	0–1	—	1–0
West Adelaide	2–1	1–3	5–3	2–1	1–5	2–0	1–1	0–3	3–1	0–3	0–1	—

Source: OzFootball
Legend: Blue = home team win; Yellow = draw; Red = away team win.
For upcoming matches, an "a" indicates there is an article about the rivalry between the two participants.

== Finals series ==
Northern Conference

Elimination and qualifying Finals
2	Sydney Croatia	2
3	Marconi Fairfield	1
4	Sydney Olympic	1
5	St George-Budapest	0

Semi-finals
1	Sydney City	1
2	Sydney Croatia	0
3	Marconi Fairfield	3 (7)
4	Sydney Olympic	3 (6)

Preliminary Final
2	Sydney Croatia	0
3	Marconi Fairfield	1

Northern Final
1	Sydney City	2
3	Marconi Fairfield	0

Southern Conference

Elimination and qualifying Finals
2	Brunswick Juventus	2
3	Heidelberg United	0
4	Melbourne Croatia	1
5	Preston Makedonia	2

Semi-finals
1	South Melbourne	0
2	Brunswick Juventus	1
3	Heidelberg United	0
5	Preston Makedonia	2

Preliminary Final
1	South Melbourne	4 (4)
5	Preston Makedonia	4 (5)

Southern Final
2	Brunswick Juventus	2
5	Preston Makedonia	1

=== Grand Final ===
First Leg
4 September 1985

Sydney City	0 – 1	Brunswick Juventus
		Incantalupo 38'

St George Stadium, Sydney
Attendance: 2,491
Referee: Peter Rampley

Second Leg
8 September 1985

Brunswick Juventus	1 – 0	Sydney City
Incantalupo 41'

Olympic Park Stadium, Melbourne
Attendance: 7,560
Referee: Don Campbell
- Brunswick Juventus win 2–0 on aggregate

== Individual awards ==
Award	Winner	Club
National Soccer League Player of the Year	(Scotland) Graham Honeyman	West Adelaide
National Soccer League Under 21 Player of the Year	(Australia) Alan Hunter	Brisbane Lions
National Soccer League Coach of the Year	(Scotland) Eddie Thomson	Sydney City
