= 1984 National Soccer League =

Australian soccer season

National Soccer League
- Season: 1984
- Dates: 4 March – 28 October 1984
- Champions: South Melbourne; 1st title
- Premiers: Sydney City (Northern); South Melbourne (Southern)
- Relegated: Melita Eagles
- Matches: 350
- Goals: 969 (2.77 per match)
- Top goalscorer: Duggie Brown (22)
- Biggest home win: West Adelaide 7–0 Sunshine George Cross (29 April 1984); Sydney City 8–1 Newcastle Rosebud United (9 May 1984); South Melbourne 7–0 Newcastle Rosebud United (22 July 1984)
- Biggest away win: Penrith City 1–7 Marconi Fairfield (22 April 1984)
- Highest scoring: Sydney City 8–1 Newcastle Rosebud United (9 May 1984)
- Highest attendance: 12,000; Brunswick Zebras 2–1 South Melbourne (8 April 1984)
- Lowest attendance: 250; Penrith City 2–0 Brisbane City (15 April 1984)
- Total attendance: 885,776
- Average attendance: 2,788

The 1984 National Soccer League season was the eighth season of the National Soccer League in Australia. This season saw a restructure of the league, introducing a split into two geographical divisions, and an expansion from 16 to 24 teams. A Northern Conference comprised 12 clubs from New South Wales and Australian Capital Territory, and a Southern Conference consisted of 12 Victorian, South Australian, and Queensland clubs.

This season also saw the introduction of the two well-supported Croatian clubs, Melbourne Croatia and Sydney Croatia, both of which had had recent success in the state-leagues.

For the first time in the competition, a finals system was introduced, whereby the five highest finishing teams in each conference had a playoff to determine a conference winner. The two conference winners then played each other in a two-legged Grand Final to be declared champions. The Grand Final was won by South Melbourne over Sydney Olympic.

== Teams ==
Twenty-four teams competed in the league (twelve in the Northern Conference and twelve in the Southern Conference) – the sixteen teams from the previous season and eight teams accepted from their respective state leagues.

=== Stadiums and locations ===
Note: Table lists in alphabetical order by conference.

| Team | Location | Stadium | Capacity |
Northern Conference
| APIA Leichhardt | Sydney (Leichhardt) | Lambert Park | 7,000 |
| Blacktown City | Sydney (Seven Hills) | Gabbie Stadium | 5,000 |
| Canberra Arrows | Canberra | Canberra Stadium | 25,011 |
| Marconi Fairfield | Sydney (Bossley Park) | Marconi Stadium | 9,000 |
| Melita Eagles | Sydney (Parramatta) | Melita Stadium | 10,000 |
| Newcastle Rosebud United | Newcastle | Adamstown Oval | 2,000 |
| Penrith City | Penrith | Cook Park | 1,000 |
| St George-Budapest | Sydney (Mortdale) | St George Stadium | 12,000 |
| Sydney City | Sydney (Bondi) | ES Marks Athletics Field | 8,000 |
| Sydney Croatia | Sydney (Edensor Park) | King Tomislav Park | 10,000 |
| Sydney Olympic | Sydney (Waterloo) | Pratten Park | 15,000 |
| Wollongong City | Wollongong | Wollongong Showground | 22,000 |
Southern Conference
| Adelaide City | Adelaide (Kensington) | Olympic Sports Field | 8,000 |
| Brisbane City | Brisbane (Newmarket) | Spencer Park | 5,000 |
| Brisbane Lions | Brisbane (Inala) | Lions Stadium | 5,000 |
| Brunswick Juventus | Melbourne (Footscray) | Olympic Park | 18,500 |
| Footscray JUST | Melbourne (Footscray) | Schintler Reserve | ? |
| Green Gully | Melbourne (St Albans) | Green Gully Reserve | 10,000 |
| Heidelberg United | Melbourne (Brunswick) | Olympic Village | 12,000 |
| Melbourne Croatia | Melbourne (Elsternwick) | Olympic Park | 18,500 |
| Preston Makedonia | Melbourne (Fitzroy) | B.T. Connor Reserve | 5,000 |
| South Melbourne | Melbourne (Middle Park) | Middle Park | 18,000 |
| Sunshine George Cross | Melbourne (City of Melbourne) | Chaplin Reserve | 5,000 |
| West Adelaide | Adelaide (City of Adelaide) | Hindmarsh Stadium | 16,500 |

=== Managerial changes ===
The Australian Soccer Annual 1984 reported 11 managerial changes.

| Team | Outgoing manager | Date of vacancy | Position in the table | Incoming manager | Date of appointment |
|---|---|---|---|---|---|
| Adelaide City | (Scotland) Bobby Ferguson | 1984 | Pre-season | (Australia) Edmund Kreft | 1984 |
| Brisbane City | (Scotland) Jim Hermiston | 1984 | Pre-season | (Scotland) Joe Gilroy | 1984 |
| Canberra Arrows | (Australia) Attila Abonyi | 1984 | Pre-season | (England) Doug Collins | 1984 |
| Heidelberg United | (Australia) Jim Tansey | 1984 | Pre-season | (England) Brian Garvey | 1984 |
| Marconi Fairfield | (Australia) Tony Henderson (caretaker) | 1984 | Pre-season | (Australia) Les Scheinflug | 1984 |
| West Adelaide | (Australia) Peter Koulizos | 1984 | Pre-season | (Australia) Sam Salabasidis | 1984 |
| Wollongong City | (Scotland) Willie Wallace | 1984 | Pre-season | (Australia) Adrian Alston | 1984 |
| Green Gully | (Wales) David Smallman | 1984 | Pre-season | (Australia) Jimmy Rooney | 1984 |
| Melbourne Croatia | (Australia) Tommy Cumming | 1984 | Pre-season | (Australia) Terry Hennessy | 1984 |
| Sydney Croatia | (Croatia) Josip Kuže | 1984 | Pre-season | (Australia) Attila Abonyi | 1984 |
| Penrith City | Inaugural | 1984 | Pre-season | (Scotland) Willie Wallace | 1984 |

== League tables ==
Northern Conference

| Pos | Team | Pld | W | D | L | GF | GA | GD | Pts | Qualification or relegation |
|---|---|---|---|---|---|---|---|---|---|---|
| 1 | Sydney City | 28 | 17 | 8 | 3 | 67 | 21 | +46 | 42 | Qualification to Finals series |
| 2 | Sydney Olympic | 28 | 16 | 8 | 4 | 61 | 27 | +34 | 40 | Qualification to Finals series |
| 3 | Marconi Fairfield | 28 | 12 | 8 | 8 | 58 | 39 | +19 | 32 | Qualification to Finals series |
| 4 | APIA Leichhardt | 28 | 12 | 8 | 8 | 43 | 35 | +8 | 32 | Qualification to Finals series |
| 5 | Blacktown City | 28 | 12 | 6 | 10 | 43 | 48 | −5 | 30 | Qualification to Finals series |
| 6 | Sydney Croatia | 28 | 8 | 11 | 9 | 32 | 38 | −6 | 27 | |
| 7 | Penrith City | 28 | 8 | 10 | 10 | 29 | 41 | −12 | 26 | |
| 8 | Newcastle Rosebud United | 28 | 11 | 4 | 13 | 35 | 52 | −17 | 26 | |
| 9 | Canberra Arrows | 28 | 12 | 1 | 15 | 47 | 39 | +8 | 25 | |
| 10 | St George-Budapest | 28 | 8 | 9 | 11 | 38 | 41 | −3 | 25 | |
| 11 | Melita Eagles (R) | 28 | 8 | 8 | 12 | 23 | 38 | −15 | 24 | Relegation to the 1985 NSW State League |
| 12 | Wollongong City | 28 | 5 | 5 | 18 | 22 | 59 | −37 | 15 | |

Updated to match(es) played on unknown. Source: rsssf.com
Rules for classification: 1) points; 2) goal difference; 3) number of goals scored.
(R) Relegated

Southern Conference

| Pos | Team | Pld | W | D | L | GF | GA | GD | Pts | Qualification |
|---|---|---|---|---|---|---|---|---|---|---|
| 1 | South Melbourne (C) | 28 | 18 | 4 | 6 | 48 | 20 | +28 | 40 | Qualification to Finals series |
| 2 | Heidelberg United | 28 | 14 | 7 | 7 | 37 | 27 | +10 | 35 | Qualification to Finals series |
| 3 | Melbourne Croatia | 28 | 13 | 7 | 8 | 38 | 31 | +7 | 33 | Qualification to Finals series |
| 4 | Brisbane Lions | 28 | 12 | 6 | 10 | 38 | 36 | +2 | 30 | Qualification to Finals series |
| 5 | Brunswick Juventus | 28 | 13 | 4 | 11 | 36 | 42 | −6 | 30 | Qualification to Finals series |
| 6 | Preston Makedonia | 28 | 11 | 6 | 11 | 42 | 33 | +9 | 28 | |
| 7 | Adelaide City | 28 | 10 | 5 | 13 | 33 | 34 | −1 | 25 | |
| 8 | Footscray JUST | 28 | 10 | 5 | 13 | 29 | 33 | −4 | 25 | |
| 9 | Green Gully | 28 | 9 | 6 | 13 | 34 | 36 | −2 | 24 | |
| 10 | West Adelaide | 28 | 8 | 5 | 15 | 40 | 52 | −12 | 21 | |
| 11 | Brisbane City | 28 | 8 | 5 | 15 | 21 | 39 | −18 | 21 | |
| 12 | Sunshine George Cross | 28 | 5 | 6 | 17 | 24 | 57 | −33 | 16 | |

Updated to match(es) played on unknown. Source: rsssf.com
Rules for classification: 1) points; 2) goal difference; 3) number of goals scored.
(C) Champions

== Results ==
| Home \ Away | ADE | API | BLA | BRC | BRL | BRU | CAN | FOO | GRE | HEI | MAR | MCR | MEA | NRU | PEN | PRE | SOU | STG | SGC | SCI | SCR | SOL | WES | WOL | ADE | API | BLA | BRC | BRL | BRU | CAN | FOO | GRE | HEI | MAR | MCR | MEA | NRU | PEN | PRE | SOU | STG | SGC | SCI | SCR | SOL | WES | WOL |
|---|---|---|---|---|---|---|---|---|---|---|---|---|---|---|---|---|---|---|---|---|---|---|---|---|---|---|---|---|---|---|---|---|---|---|---|---|---|---|---|---|---|---|---|---|---|---|---|---|
| Adelaide City | | | | 1–2 | | 2–0 | 1–2 | 2–0 | 3–1 | 1–1 | | 2–3 | | | | 0–0 | 2–3 | 0–1 | 1–1 | | | | 1–0 | | | | | 2–1 | | | | | | | | | | | | | | | | | | | 3–2 | |
| APIA Leichhardt | | | 2–1 | | 0–1 | | 2–0 | | | | 1–0 | | 1–2 | | 1–0 | | | 3–2 | | 2–1 | 0–1 | 0–2 | 4–1 | 1–1 | | | | | | | | | | | 3–3 | | | | | | | | | | | | | |
| Blacktown City | | 2–2 | | 2–0 | 3–4 | | 4–3 | | | | 2–2 | | 0–0 | | 4–1 | 4–1 | | 1–0 | | 1–1 | 2–2 | 0–2 | | 2–0 | | | | | | | | | | | | | | | | | | | | 1–4 | | | | |
| Brisbane City | | 0–0 | | | 0–1 | 0–1 | | | | 0–2 | 2–2 | 0–1 | 0–1 | | | | 1–0 | | | | 1–1 | | | 1–1 | | | | | 0–2 | | | | | | | | 2–1 | | | | | | | | | | | |
| Brisbane Lions | | | 2–2 | 2–0 | | 2–1 | | 0–1 | 2–1 | | | | | | 0–3 | 1–0 | | 3–2 | 4–2 | 0–2 | 2–2 | 1–1 | | | | | | 2–1 | | | | | | | | | | | | | | | 3–0 | | | | | |
| Brunswick Juventus | 1–0 | | | 2–3 | 1–0 | | | 0–2 | 1–4 | 5–1 | | 2–1 | | 2–0 | | 2–4 | 2–1 | | 4–2 | | | | | | | | | | | | | | | 0–1 | | 0–3 | | 1–1 | | | | | | | | | | |
| Canberra Arrows | | | 0–1 | | | 1–2 | | 0–1 | | 1–0 | 0–2 | 3–0 | 1–2 | 2–1 | | | 3–1 | | | 0–1 | 1–2 | | 5–2 | 4–0 | | | | | | | | | | | | | | | | | | | | | | | | |
| Footscray JUST | 0–0 | | | | | 0–0 | 3–1 | | 0–1 | 0–3 | | 0–0 | | | | 4–0 | 1–2 | | 1–0 | | | | 0–1 | | | | | | | | | | 1–0 | | | | | | | | 0–3 | | | | | | | |
| Green Gully | 2–1 | | | 2–0 | | 2–3 | 3–0 | 2–3 | | 1–1 | | 0–1 | | | | 0–0 | 0–2 | | 2–3 | | | | 2–1 | 1–1 | | | | 2–0 | | | | | | | | | | | | | | | | | | | | |
| Heidelberg United | 1–0 | 1–0 | | | 3–1 | 2–3 | 2–1 | 1–0 | 0–0 | | | 5–2 | | 2–1 | | 2–1 | 0–2 | | 1–1 | | | | 1–1 | | | | | | | 3–0 | | | | | | | | | | | | | | | | | | |
| Marconi Fairfield | | 1–3 | 1–2 | | 1–0 | 0–1 | | | | | | | 1–1 | 2–1 | 2–1 | | | 4–1 | 6–1 | 1–1 | 2–0 | 0–1 | | 4–0 | | 4–1 | | | | | | | | | | | | | 1–1 | | | | | | | | | |
| Melbourne Croatia | 2–0 | | | | 2–2 | 0–1 | | 3–1 | 1–0 | 0–0 | | | | 1–1 | | 1–0 | 0–2 | | 2–0 | | | 2–1 | 1–1 | | | | | | | | | | | 0–2 | | | | | | 3–1 | | | | | | | | |
| Melita Eagles | | 1–2 | 1–0 | | 2–0 | | | 2–1 | | | 2–2 | | | 1–3 | 1–1 | | | 1–0 | | 0–2 | 1–2 | 0–0 | | 0–1 | | | 0–2 | | | | | | | | | | | | 0–2 | | | | | | 0–1 | | | |
| Newcastle Rosebud United | 2–0 | 1–1 | 2–1 | | | | 0–4 | 1–0 | 3–0 | | | | | | 1–0 | 1–0 | | 3–1 | 3–0 | | | 1–5 | | | | | | | | | 2–1 | | 1–2 | | | | | | | | | | | | | | | 1–2 |
| Penrith City | | 0–3 | 2–0 | 2–0 | | | 2–1 | | | | 1–7 | | 1–1 | 0–2 | | | | 1–1 | | 0–0 | | 0–1 | | 3–2 | | | | 0–0 | | | | | | | | | | | | | | | | | | | | |
| Preston Makedonia | 1–2 | | | 1–2 | 0–0 | 3–0 | 1–2 | 1–1 | 1–1 | 1–0 | | 2–2 | | | 6–0 | | 0–1 | | 5–2 | | 3–3 | | 5–1 | | 2–0 | | | | | | 1–2 | 1–0 | | | | | | | | | | | | | | | | |
| South Melbourne | 1–0 | | | | | 1–0 | | 2–2 | 2–1 | 2–0 | | 1–0 | | 7–0 | | 1–2 | | | 0–1 | 0–0 | | | 4–0 | | | | | | 0–0 | | | | | | | 3–0 | | | | | | | | 0–0 | | | | |
| St George-Budapest | | 2–2 | 1–2 | 1–2 | | | 2–1 | | | | 2–0 | | 1–1 | 3–0 | | | | | | 1–4 | 1–1 | 0–0 | | 3–2 | | | 4–0 | | | | | | | | | | | | | | | | | | | 2–2 | | |
| Sunshine George Cross | 0–1 | | | 0–1 | | 3–0 | 1–4 | 0–2 | 0–0 | 1–1 | | 0–0 | | | | 0–2 | 1–2 | | | | | | 2–0 | 1–1 | | | | | | | | | 1–0 | | | | | | | | | | | | | | 1–2 | |
| Sydney City | | 1–2 | 4–0 | 3–1 | | | | | | | 3–1 | | 2–0 | 8–1 | 1–1 | | | 0–1 | | | 1–1 | 4–3 | | 5–0 | | 2–1 | | | | | | | | | | | 6–0 | | | | | | | | | 1–1 | | |
| Sydney Croatia | 3–3 | | 1–2 | 1–2 | 2–1 | | 1–1 | | | | 1–2 | | 0–1 | 1–1 | 0–1 | | | 2–0 | | 0–5 | | 1–3 | | 2–0 | | | | 3–1 | | | | | | | | | | | | | | | | | | | | |
| Sydney Olympic | 1–1 | 4–2 | 6–1 | 4–0 | | | | | | | 2–2 | 1–3 | 2–0 | | 2–0 | | | | | 1–2 | 2–0 | | | 3–0 | | | | | | | | | | | 4–2 | | 3–0 | | | | | | | | | | | |
| West Adelaide | 0–1 | | | | | 2–2 | | 1–2 | 3–1 | 0–1 | | 0–4 | | 4–1 | | 0–1 | 1–2 | 2–2 | 7–0 | | | | | | 2–1 | | | | | | | | | | | | | | | | 3–1 | | 2–0 | | | | | |
| Wollongong City | | 0–3 | 1–2 | | 3–2 | | 0–1 | | | | 1–3 | | 1–1 | 1–0 | 0–2 | | 1–2 | 1–2 | | 1–3 | 2–1 | 0–3 | | | | | | | | | | | | | | | | | | | | | | | 0–1 | | | |

Source: OzFootball
Legend: Blue = home team win; Yellow = draw; Red = away team win.

Five matches occurred where the fixture was played a third time in the 1984 season.

- St George-Budapest 0–1 Blacktown City
- Brisbane City 1–0 Brisbane Lions
- St George-Budapets 1–2 Sydney Olympic
- West Adelaide 0–3 Adelaide City
- Footscray JUST 1–3 Green Gully

== Finals series ==
Northern Conference

Elimination and qualifying Finals
2 | Sydney Olympic | 2
3 | Marconi Fairfield | 1
4 | APIA Leichhardt Tigers | 3
5 | Blacktown City | 1

Semi-finals
1 | Sydney City | 1 (4)
2 | Sydney Olympic | 1 (2)
3 | Marconi Fairfield | 3 (3)
4 | APIA Leichhardt Tigers | 3 (4)

Preliminary Final
2 | Sydney Olympic | 3
4 | APIA Leichhardt Tigers | 0

Northern Final
1 | Sydney City | 1
2 | Sydney Olympic | 2

Southern Conference

Elimination and qualifying Finals
2 | Heidelberg United | 1
3 | Melbourne Croatia | 2
4 | Brisbane Lions | 4
5 | Brunswick Juventus | 2

Semi-finals
1 | South Melbourne | 3
3 | Melbourne Croatia | 2
2 | Heidelberg United | 0 (3)
4 | Brisbane Lions | 0 (2)

Preliminary Final
2 | Heidelberg United | 3
3 | Melbourne Croatia | 1

Southern Final
1 | South Melbourne | 4
2 | Heidelberg United | 2

=== Grand Final ===
First Leg
24 October 1984

| South Melbourne | 2–1 | Sydney Olympic |
|---|---|---|
| Egan 43', 64' | | Koussas 5' |

Olympic Park Stadium, Melbourne
Attendance: 10,000
Referee: Doug Rennie

Second Leg
28 October 1984

| Sydney Olympic | 1–2 | South Melbourne |
|---|---|---|
| Theodorakopoulos 34' | | Crino 10'; Yzendoorn 18' |

St George Stadium, Sydney
Attendance: 11,221
Referee: Chris Bambridge
- South Melbourne win 4–2 on aggregate

== Individual awards ==
| Award | Winner | Club |
|---|---|---|
| National Soccer League Player of the Year | (Australia) Sergio Melta | Adelaide City |
| National Soccer League Under 21 Player of the Year | (Australia) Tony Franken | Canberra City |
| National Soccer League Coach of the Year | (Australia) Eddie Thomson | Sydney City |
