= Garry Power =

Irish bobsledder

Personal information
- Nationality: Irish
- Born: 1 September 1962 (age 62)

Sport
- Sport: Bobsleigh

Garry Power (born 1 September 1962) is an Irish bobsledder. He competed in the four man event at the 1998 Winter Olympics.
