= Žarko Odžakov =

Australian footballer

Personal information
- Full name: Žarko Odžakov; Жарко Оџаков
- Date of birth: 11 November 1955 (age 71)
- Place of birth: Dojran
- Position: Midfielder

Senior career*
Years	Team	Apps	(Gls)
1974–1982	Vardar	109	(9)
1982–1984	Preston Makedonia	54	(10)
1985–1987	Sydney Croatia	67	(17)
1988–1990	Blacktown City	55	(2)
Total		285	(38)

International career
1985–1987	Australia	13	(3)
1989	Australia (futsal)	3	(1)

Managerial career
- 2001: Vardar
- 2002–2003: Macedonia U21
- * Club domestic league appearances and goals

Žarko Odžakov (Macedonian: Жарко Оџаков; born 11 November 1955) is a retired soccer player who played as a midfielder. Born in Yugoslavia, he played for the Australia national team 13 times. Former Australia coach Rale Rasic in 2006 picked Odžakov in his greatest Socceroo team.

== Playing career ==
=== Club career ===
==== FK Vardar ====
Odžakov played 109 matches over eight years for FK Vardar in the Yugoslav First League, scoring nine goals.

==== Preston ====
In 1982, he emigrated to Australia where he played for Preston Makedonia in the National Soccer League.

==== Sydney Croatia ====
From 1985 until 1987 he played at NSL club Sydney Croatia. It was at Croatia that he took the notice of the Australian selectors.

==== Blacktown City ====
After two years at Croatia, he moved to Blacktown City where he played two years, playing 55 NSL matches.

=== International career ===
==== Outdoor football ====
In 1985 Odžakov played his first international match for the Australia. In all he played 13 full international matches for the Socceroos, playing his last match in 1987.

==== Futsal ====
Odžakov played three matches for the Australia national futsal team at the 1989 FIFA Futsal World Championship.

== Coaching career ==
Soon after retiring Odžakov returned to his native North Macedonia. He soon received his coaching accreditation in Belgrade.

After a string of assistant coaching roles Odžakov had stint managing FK Vardar, where he managed to place Vardar in the top half of the Macedonian First League.

Odžakov managed various North Macedonia youth teams, including the North Macedonia national under-21 football team.

== Zarko Odzakov Cup ==
The Zarko Odzakov Cup is named in honour of Odžakov. It is contested by Sydney United (formerly Sydney Croatia) and Bankstown City (a team representing the Macedonian-Australian community).
