= Preston Lions FC =

Soccer club based in Melbourne, Victoria

- Full name: Preston Lions Football Club
- Nicknames: Makedonija (Makedonija; Macedonia); Лавови (Lavovi; Lions); Reds
- Founded: 1947 (79 years ago)
- Ground: Genis Steel Stadium; Reservoir, Victoria
- Chairman: David Cvetkovski
- Coach: Zoran Markovski (men's)
- League: NPL Victoria (men's)
- 2026: 6th of 14
- Website: plfc.com.au
Home colours	Away colours	Third colours

Preston Lions Football Club, nicknamed Makedonija (Macedonian: Македонија, pronounced [makɛˈdɔnija]), is a soccer club based in the suburb of Reservoir in Melbourne, Victoria. Its senior men's and women's teams play in the National Premier Leagues Victoria and Victoria Women, both in the second tier of the Australian league system. It also competes in the Australian Championship as a foundation club. It plays its home games at B.T. Connor Reserve.

Founded by Macedonian Australians in 1947 as Preston Makedonia SC, the club joined Football Victoria in 1959. Makedonia moved between divisions throughout the 1960s and 70s, before finding stability in the first division and winning their first Victorian title in 1980. It subsequently moved to the National Soccer League, where it played thirteen seasons, though failed to win any honours. Financial difficulties forced a return to the Victorian leagues in 1993, adopting its current name shortly afterward. The men's team's current tenure in the first division came after promotion in 2024, while its women's team won promotion to the first division in 2022.

The Preston Lions have won four Victorian men's titles and one Dockerty Cup. The club's best performances in the Australia Cup are sixth round appearances in 2015 and 2024. Its supporter groups include the Preston Boys, PME47, and the Preston Makedonia Ultras. Notable former players for the club include men's national team players Žarko Odžakov, Sasa Ognenovski, and Warren Spink.

== History ==
=== Foundation ===
The club was founded in 1947 and was affiliated with the Victorian Soccer Federation (now Football Victoria) in 1959. Based in the suburb of Preston, Victoria, the club was originally created as a focal point for the newly immigrated Macedonian community to gather and socialise, and to provide the then youth with the opportunity to learn and play the "world game" that was so popular back in their homeland of Macedonia.

=== Transformation of the club and affiliation to VSF ===
In 1959 the club established itself from an amateur club to a semi-professional club, and a change of name to the Preston Makedonia Soccer Club with promotion to the Victorian Division Two (South Competition). Preston Makedonia moved forward in leaps and bounds to become champions of the Victorian Metropolitan League Division One in 1966, and as a result, was promoted to the state's top competition, the Victorian State League in 1967.

The club first experienced championship success at the state's top level in 1975 and again in 1980. As Victorian champions, Preston Makedonia competed in a play-off against other state champions and in 1981 they were promoted to the then National Soccer League (NSL) competition.

During this significant period of growth the need for much larger facilities became apparent and the club consequently moved from its home base of T.A. Cochrane Reserve in Collier Street, Preston, to its current home ground at B.T. Connor Reserve in nearby Reservoir. The Preston Lions Social Club was also established around the same time and is located directly opposite the ground.

=== National Soccer League ===
Chart of yearly table positions for Preston Makedonia in NSL

Preston Makedonia continued to compete successfully in the NSL for the next 13 years, achieving their best finish in 1987 as runner-up in the national championship. In 1992 Preston Makedonia took out the prestigious Dockerty Cup in a thrilling penalty shootout against arch rivals South Melbourne. However financial difficulties led to poor performances and in 1993 Preston Makedonia played their last match in the NSL.

=== Victorian Premier League ===
Relegated to the Victorian Premier League, Preston Makedonia were once again crowned Victorian champions in 1994. Around this time, Soccer Australia forced VPL clubs to abolish any ethnicity associated with their club names. Preston Makedonia Soccer Club was renamed the Preston Lions Soccer Club. The club has since adopted the title of the Preston Lions Football Club, following the lead set by the sports’ governing body and keeping in line with how the game is known in the UK and countries where people don't speak English–as "football".

The club experienced a disastrous campaign in 1995, being relegated to the Victorian State League Division 1 after finishing bottom of the Premier League. Championship winning coach Peter Ollerton was sacked after five games with a record of 1 win, 1 draw and 3 losses to start the '95 campaign. Sean Lane came in on 2 April but lasted just 13 games with a 3–5–5 record. Norrie Pate oversaw the rest of the campaign as head manager but was unable to avoid the drop. Preston bounced straight back to the Premier League, winning promotion with their 2nd-place finish in the '96 State League 1.

2007 Victorian Premier League Grand Final

Makedonia would once again become Victorian Premier League champions in both 2002 and 2007, adding to its already impressive collection of trophies. Preston had 3 points deducted at the start of the 2007 season, making the feat all the more impressive. The 2007 grand final at Bob Jane Stadium against Whittlesea Zebras was attended by an estimated 4,500 people.

=== Recent History ===
In season 2009, in the club's 50 year anniversary, Preston finished the season in 12th place and were relegated, just two seasons after being crowned VPL Champions. Makedonia managed just 7 points all season in what was one of the worst ever VPL seasons recorded. Preston narrowly avoided relegation in 2010, finishing one point above the relegated FC Clifton Hill, qualifying to the relegation playoff against State League 2 side Diamond Valley United, winning the encounter 1–0 through a Robert Najdovski goal.

Preston's fall from grace was continued in the 2011 State League One season, where the club was not able to avoid relegation, finishing bottom of the table. Makedonia experienced many heavy defeats in the 2011 season, finished with 56 goals conceded, 17 more than any other side in the competition.

Preston Lions, playing in the third tier of football in Victoria for the first time in over 30 years, had a disappointing 2012 season, finishing mid-table. 2013 was more of the same for the historic outfit, placing 7th in the regionalised Victorian State League 2 North-West.

After the inception of the National Premier Leagues Victoria, Preston were "promoted" to the Victorian State League 1 North-West, but as the Premier League was split into two divisions, Preston remained at essentially the same tier, the third, as they were before in the Victorian soccer pyramid.

The 2014 season saw the Lions manage a 2nd-place finish in the league, missing out on top spot and a State League 1 NW championship by just three points. The club parted ways with head manager Josip Biskic in May and replaced him with Englishman Andy O'Dell. When O'Dell came in after Round 7, Preston were at the bottom end of the ladder. The Lions then went on an incredible run under their new coach, not losing a game for the rest of the season. A landmark moment was achieved when in August 2014, Preston were able to announce that they had eradicated their ATO debt in full, with acknowledgement arriving form the ATO in September 2014. President Zoran Trajceski resigned at the end of 2014.

The Lions followed up their 2nd-place finish in 2014 with a 4th-place finish in 2015. In June 2015, Andy O’Dell was sacked as head manager following poor results and was replaced by former player Željko Popović. Popović was initially brought in on an interim basis, but the good results he achieved until the end of the 2015 season saw him reappointed for the 2016 season. The 2016 season saw another runners-up finish in the league for the Lions, finishing six points behind champions Altona Magic SC.

With one point from three games to start the 2017 State League One season, head coach Željko Popović was replaced by former Preston Lions goalkeeper and former Hume City FC coach Lou Acevski. Acevski's first game in charge was an FFA Cup 5th qualifying round thriller, losing on penalties to fellow State League One North-West side North Sunshine Eagles FC, after the match finished 4–4 in extra time. Preston striker Chris Davies scored all four goals for his side, but blazed his penalty over the bar to give the Eagles the win. Preston finished the season in fourth place, with Davies' 14 goals enough to clinch the club's golden boot award. Robert Stambolziev also played eight games for the club, scoring nine goals.

Preston had a poor start to the 2018 season, winning just one of its opening six games. Club returnee Naum Sekulovski was given the club's captaincy. A late season charge that saw the club go 12 games undefeated, propelling the club from the bottom half to second place, saw the club come in with a chance to challenge Geelong SC for the title and subsequent promotion to the NPL. In the penultimate game of the 2018 State League 1 season, 3,869 people packed out BT Connor Reserve. A win would have seen Preston jump Geelong into first place, but the visiting club came away with a 2–0 victory, winning the championship. Queenslander Rhys Saunders was Preston's top goalscorer with 14 goals, managing the feat despite arriving mid-season.

Makedonia started the 2019 season with a 7–0 win over FC Clifton Hill, a promising sign of things to come. Preston would go undefeated until Round 11 of the season when it went down 4-2 to fellow Macedonian-backed club Sydenham Park SC. However, the club quickly recovered and went on to confirm promotion from State League 1 with a 1–0 win over Keilor Park SC. One week later, Preston claimed the State League 1 North-West championship title with a 4–0 victory over Banyule City, the club's first league title in 12 years.

Preston won the 2022 National Premier Leagues Victoria 3 competition, with star player Connor Bell taking out the joint golden boot award with 14 goals.

The club finished in 8th place in its first season in the National Premier Leagues Victoria 2 competition in 2023. Initially looking like a promotion contender, Preston's last 10 games saw 6 draws and 4 losses, falling down into mid-table. The club finished in 2nd place in its first season in the Victoria Premier League 1 competition in 2024.

=== Australian Championship (2025 onward) ===
On 20 November 2023, Preston were announced as one of the eight foundation clubs of the new Australian Championship which will begin in October 2025. They will continue to play in the VPL 1 for the 2024 season and NPL Victoria in 2025, before transitioning to the new national second league after conclusion end of NPL Victoria season 2025. It will be the first time since 1993 that Preston have competed on the national stage of Australian soccer.

== Supporters ==
Preston has traditionally garnered support from the local Macedonian community across Melbourne.

Nowadays, the club has significantly broadened its fanbase beyond the Macedonian community, with the Lions working hard to appeal to the broader soccer community in the northern suburbs of Melbourne.

Preston is well known throughout Australian soccer for having one of the largest and most dedicated supporter bases with crowds in the NSL often exceeding that of 10,000, a large figure for the time. There have been numerous supporter groups throughout the year; including Pečalbari from the 1990s who were founded by recent Macedonian immigrants to Australia, many of whom had been involved with ultras groups such as Komiti and Čkembari. Other groups include the Lions Pride from the early to mid 2000s and Lavovi Melbourne until around 2020 and Preston Makedonia Ultras, PME47 & Preston Boys until 2026. Today the club is supported by a variety of groups, including the Preston Makedonia (PMTID) and PMSC Junior Ultras.

== Current squad ==
As of 15 October 2026

Note: Flags indicate national team as defined under FIFA eligibility rules; some limited exceptions apply. Players may hold more than one non-FIFA nationality.

No.	Pos.	Nation	Player
1	GK	AUS	Ryan Scott
2	DF	AUS	Domenic Folino
3	DF	NZL	Daniel Edwards
4	DF	ERI	Jamal Ali
5	DF	AUS	Ayden Brice
7	FW	AUS	Lleyton Brooks
8	MF	AUS	Luca Blazevic
9	FW	USA	Jason Romero
10	FW	AUS	Jonas Markovski
11	FW	AUS	Stefan Zinni
12	MF	AUS	Jay Romanovski
13	MF	AUS	George Mihailidis
14	FW	AUS	Daniel Lazarevski
15	DF	MKD	Matthew Bozinovski
17	FW	GER	Marco Gueli
19	MF	AUS	Oliver Kubilay

No.	Pos.	Nation	Player
20	DF	AUS	Zachary Cianci
22	DF	AUS	Jackson Necovski
23	FW	AUS	Antonee Burke-Gilroy
24	FW	ARG	Nahuel Bonada
27	MF	AUS	Luca Tevere
29	DF	AUS	Zach Lisolajski
32	DF	AUS	Stefan Nigro
35	DF	AUS	Mihail Lazarovski
38	GK	SSD	Mayen Mayen
77	MF	SSD	Kur Kur
80	MF	AUS	Cian Cuba
99	GK	AUS	Jakob Ognenovski
—	MF	AUS	Gian Albano
—	MF	JPN	Naoki Suto
—	DF	AUS	Damien Bozinovski
—	MF	AUS	Luc Jeggo

== Current squad Women’s NPL ==
As of 4 March 2026

Note: Flags indicate national team as defined under FIFA eligibility rules; some limited exceptions apply. Players may hold more than one non-FIFA nationality.

No.	Pos.	Nation	Player
1	GK	AUS	Charlotte Hrehoresin
4	DF	AUS	Navleen Kaur
5	MF	AUS	Erika Di Tella
6	DF	AUS	Elle Talevski
7	FW	THA	Natalie Olsen
10	MF	AUS	Dragana Kljajic
12	MF	AUS	Yasmin Popovic
15	DF	NZL	Kristen Molloy
16	MF	AUS	Alannah Filipovic
17	FW	AUS	Ellie La Monte

No.	Pos.	Nation	Player
21	MF	AUS	Chanel Nikolovski
22	DF	AUS	Eva Harrington
30	FW	ENG	Hollie Massey
33	FW	AUS	Ellie Vlaeminck
34	MF	AUS	Mila Fanjek
35	DF	JPN	Mizuho Yamada
44	FW	ENG	Valentine Pursey
50	MF	AUS	Georgia Henderson
51	DF	AUS	Olivia Edwards

== Honours ==
=== National ===
- National Soccer League Runner-Up: (1) 1987
- National Soccer League(Southern Division) Runner-Up: (1) 1985
- National Soccer League Third Place: (1) 1983
- National Soccer League Finalists: (2) 1985, 1989
- National Soccer League Cup Runner-Up: (2) 1985, 1990/91
- Gold Cup Champions: (1) 1991
- Maso Cup Champions: (1) 2026
- Australian Championship: foundation club 2023 (competes from 2025 onward)
- Australia Cup Quarterfinalists: (1) 2026

=== State ===
- Victorian Premier League/ NPL Victoria Champions: (4) 1980, 1994, 2002, 2007
- Victorian Premier League/ NPL Victoria Minor Premiers: (3) 1994, 2003, 2007
- Victorian Premier League/ NPL Victoria Runners-Up: 1978
- Victorian Premier League/ NPL Victoria Finalists: (7) 1994, 1997, 2002, 2003, 2004, 2007, 2008
- Victorian Premier League 1 Runners-Up: 2024
- National Premier League 3 Victoria Champions: 2022
- Victorian Division One/ State League Division One Champions: (2) 1966, 1975
- Victorian Division One/ State League Division One Runners-Up: (3) 1964, 1965, 1996
- Victorian State League 1 North-West Champions: 2019
- Victorian State League 1 North-West Runners-Up: (2) 2014, 2016
- Victorian Division Two/State League Division Two Champions: (2) 1961, 1973
- Dockerty Cup Winners: (2) 1992, 2026
- Dockerty Cup Runner-Up: (2) 1985, 1986
- Victoria Cup Winners: (1) 1980
- State League Cup Runners-Up: (1) 1980
- Federation Cup Winners: (3) 1973, 1975, 1996
- Federation Cup Runner-Up: (1) 1963
- Macedonian Cup of Victoria Winners: (2) 2020, 2024

Women's

- Victorian Womens Premier League (2nd Tiers) Champions: 2022
- Victorian Womens Premier League (2nd Tiers) Minor Premiers: 2022

=== Metro (FFV) ===
- Metropolitan League 3 North-West Champions: 2015

== Individual awards ==
Victorian Premier League Gold Medal – Metropolitan Player of the Year

- 2015 Ibrahim Yattara

Victorian Premier League Gold Medal – VPL Player of the Year

- 2001–Chris Emsovski
- 2003–Chris Emsovski
- 2005–Anthony Magnacca

Bill Fleming Medal – Media voted VPL Player of the Year

- 1994–Adrian Pender
- 2006–Anthony Magnacca
- 2007–Tony Sterjovski

Victorian Premier League Coach of the Year

- 2007–Goran Lozanovski

Victorian Premier League Top Goalscorer

- 1979–Gary Ward

Victorian Premier League Goalkeeper of the Year

- 1999–Lou Acevski

Victorian Premier League Under 21 Player of the Year

- 2005–Serkan Oksuz

Jimmy Rooney Medal – VPL Grand Final Man of the Match

- 1994–Chris Sterjovski
- 2002–John Spazaovski
- 2007–Zoran Petrevski

Weinstein Medal Junior Player of the Year

- 1989-Robert Spasevski

== Representative Soccer ==
Australian Representatives – Senior Level

- Doug Brown
- Billy Celeski
- Gary Cole
- Oscar Crino
- Robbie Dunn
- David Jones
- John Little
- George Jolevski
- Goran Lozanovski
- John Markovski
- Zarko Odzakov
- Sasa Ognenovski
- Peter Ollerton
- Con Opasinis
- George Slifkas
- Warren Spink
- Sean Lane
- Phil Traianedes
- Kris Trajanovski
- Andrew Zinni

National Representatives – Youth Team

- John Little (AUS)
- Warren Spink (AUS)
- John Markovski (AUS)
- Robert Spasevski
- Naum Sekulovski (AUS)
- Kris Trajanovski (AUS)
- Goran Lozanovski (AUS)
- Vasco Trpcevski (AUS)
- Bill Tijuelo (AUS)
- Daniel Miller (AUS)
- George Campbell (SCO)
- Graham Heys (ENG)
- Robert Stambolziev (AUS)

Victorian State Representatives – Senior Level

- George Campbell
- John Sapazovski
- Anthony Magnacca
- Pece Siveski
- Serkan Oksuz
- Jonathan Munoz
- Sean Lane
- Robert Spasevski
- Robert Stojcevski
- Steve Jackson

== Women's Representative Soccer ==
Senior Level

- Natalie Olsen (Thailand)

National Representatives – Youth Team

- Kristen Molloy (NZ)
- Hollie Massey (ENG)

== Notable former coaches ==
- (North Macedonia) Ljube Jančev
- (North Macedonia) Andon Dončevski
- (Scotland) Ernie Merrick
- (Australia) Peter Ollerton
- (Australia) Goran Lozanovski
- (England) Brian Edgley
- (Croatia) (Australia) Josip Biskic
- (Australia) Louie Acevski

== Records ==
- Most Games: Chris Emsovski 158, John Sapazovski 123, Sasa Ognenovski 122
- Most Finals Games: Chris Emsovski 8
- Most Career Goals: John Sapazovski 61
- Most Season Goals: Saso Markovski 19 (1998)

== Season-to-season records ==
● Preston Makedonia Inaugural season *Victorian Provisional League*

1959 - 4th - 10 Teams in League.

● Victorian Metropolitan League Division 2

1960 -3rd - 10 Teams in League.

1961 - 1st - 10 Teams in League ***Promoted*** to Victorian Division 1 South.

1962 - 10th- 12 Teams in League.

1963 - 7th -12 Teams League.

1964 - 2nd - 12 Teams in League.

1965 - 2nd - 12 Teams in League.

1966 - 1st - 12 Teams in League. ***CHAMPIONS**

** Promoted** to STATE LEAGUE. (Premier League).

1967 - 12th - 12 Teams in League. **Relegated** to Metropolitan League Division 1

1968 -3rd - 12 Teams in League.

1969 -7th - 12 Teams in League.

1970 -7th - 12 Teams in League.

1971 -8th - 12 Teams in League. **Relegated** to Metropolitan League Division 2

1972 - 3rd - 12 Teams in League.

1973 - 1st - 12 Teams in League ***CHAMPIONS****Victorian Metropolitan League Division 2 **Promoted**to Victorian Metropolitan League Division 1

1974 - 3rd - 12 Teams in League.

1975 - 1st ***Champions*** Victorian Metropolitan League Division 1**Promoted to State League**

1976 - 7th ' 12 Teams in League.

1977 - 10th - 12 Teams in League.

1978 - 2nd **Runners up** - 12 Teams in League.

1979 - 3rd-12 Teams in League.

1980 - 1st ***Champions*** - 12 Teams.

● Promoted to the National Soccer League (NSL) for 13 Seasons.

1981 - 12th- 16 Teams in League.

1982 - 5th- 16 Teams in League.

1983 - 3rd- 16 Teams in League.

1984 - 6th - 12 Teams in League.

1985 - 5th - 12 Teams in League.

1986 - 6th - 12 Teams in League.

1987 - 2nd - 14 Teams in League ** Runners Up**

1988 - 12th - 14 Teams in League.

1989 - 5th - 14 Teams in League.

1989/1990 - 9th - 14 Teams in League.

1990/1991 - 8th - 14 Teams in League.

1991/1992 - 14th - 14 Teams in League.

1992/1993 - 13th - 14 Teams in League

Season 92/93 ** Relegated** to VPL

- Victorian Premier League

1994 - 1st ***Champions***

1995 - 12th ** Relegated ** to Victorian State League Division 1

- Victorian State League Division 1

1996 - 2nd Runners - up & Promoted to Victorian Premier League

- Victorian Premier League

1997 - 4th

1998 - 8th

1999 - 3rd

2000 - 5th

2001 - 9th

2002 - 5th in regular season *Champions*

2003 - 1st *Minor Premiership*

2004 - 4th

2005 - 7th

2006 - 7th

2007- 1st ***Champions***

2008 - 6th

2009 - 12th ** Relegated to Victorian State League Division 1

- Victorian State League Division 1

2010 - 10th

2011 - 12th ** Relegated to Victorian State League Division 2 N/W

2012 - 9th

2013 - 7th

2014 - 2nd

- 2014 season Renamed to Victorian State League Division 1 as a result of the re-structure from FFV and the Inaugural seasons of NPL & NPL 1 *

2015 - 4th

2016 - 2nd

2017 - 4th

2018 - 3rd

2019 - 1st ***Champions*** & Promoted to NPL 3 Victoria

- National Premier League 3 Victoria

2020 - Cancelled due to the COVID-19 pandemic in Australia

2021 - Cancelled mid-season due to the COVID-19 pandemic in Australia

2022 - 1st ***Champions*** & Promoted to NPL 2 Victoria

- National Premier League 2 Victoria

2023 - 8th

Victoria Premier League 1

- 2024 season Renamed to Victoria Premier League 1 as a result of the re-structure from Football Victoria *

2024 - 2nd & Promoted to NPL Victoria

- National Premier League Victoria

2025 - 5th in regular season

2026 - 6th

- Australian Championship

2025 - 3rd in Group C

== See also ==
- List of Preston Lions players
