= List of Wollongong Wolves FC seasons =

Wollongong Wolves FC is an association football club based in Wollongong, Australia. The club was formed in 1980 as has competed at the highest tier of soccer in Australia. Currently, the club participates in the National Premier Leagues NSW competition, which is the second highest tier of soccer in Australia. The club has won one continental championship, two national championships and two state championships. After participating of NPL NSW, the club set to joined Australian Championship from October 2025.

== Key ==
Key to league competitions

- NSL = National Soccer League
- AC = Australian Championship
- NSW Div. 1 = New South Wales Division One
- NSWPL = New South Wales Premier League
- NPL NSW = National Premier Leagues NSW

Key to colours and symbols:

1st or W	Winners
2nd or RU	Runners-up
3rd	Third
♦	Top scorer in division

Key to finals and cup record:

- PF = Preliminary Final
- PO = Playoff Final
- EF = Elimination Final
- 1R, 2R, 3R...7R = 1st Round, 2nd Round, 3rd Round...7th Round
- R32 = Round of 32
- R16 = Round of 16
- GS = Group Stage
- QF = Quarter-finalist
- SF = Semi-finalist
- RU = Runners-Up
- W = Winners

Key to tournaments:

- OCC = OFC Club Championship
- FCWC = FIFA Club World Cup
- NPLF = National Premier Leagues Finals

== Seasons ==
Season	League										Waratah Cup	Australia Cup (Note: Includes NSL Cup (1977–1997) and FFA Cup/Australia Cup (since 2014))	Aus Championship	Other	Top scorer	
Season	Div	P	W	D	L	F	A	Pts	Pos	Finals	Waratah Cup	Australia Cup	Aus Championship	Other	Player(s)	G
1981	NSL	30	8	12	10	35	39	28	11th	N/A		1R	n/a		Jim McBreen (Note: 7 league goals)	8
1982	NSL	30	16	3	11	43	46	35	3rd	N/A		R16	n/a		Phil O'Connor (Note: 17 League goals)	18
1983	NSL	30	4	15	11	41	55	27	15th	N/A		R16	n/a		Roy Cotton (Note: 12 League goals, shared with Phil O'Connor)	13
1984	NSL/NC (Note: During 1984 to 1986, the league was split into two conferences – The Wolves played in the Northern Conference and the position in the table reflects position in the conference.)	28	5	5	18	22	59	15	12th			GS	n/a		Peter Kotamanidis (Note: 8 League goals)	9
1985	NSL/NC	22	5	6	11	29	46	16	10th			R16	n/a		Pat Brodnik (Note: 6 League goals)	6
1986	NSL/NC	22	9	5	8	26	25	23	8th			R16	n/a		Robert Giraldi (Note: 8 League goals)	8
1987	NSW Div. 1	26	20	2	4	61	30	42	1st	W			n/a			
1988	NSL	26	13	8	5	44	32	34	1st	PF		1R	n/a		Marshall Soper (Note: 6 League goals)	6
1989	NSL	26	8	7	11	22	29	23	9th			QF	n/a		Randell Easthorpe	6
1989–90	NSL	26	8	4	14	30	48	20	11th			R16	n/a			
1990–91	NSL	26	8	8	10	32	34	24	9th			QF	n/a			
1991–92	NSL	26	9	10	7	24	17	28	5th	EF		QF	n/a			
1992–93	NSL	26	11	6	9	33	27	39	4th	SF		1R	n/a			
1993–94	NSL	26	6	9	12	24	32	27	11th	–	SF	?	n/a			
1994–95	NSL (Note: Draws went to penalty shoot-outs during the 1994/95 season (2 points for win, 1 point for loss). Wolves won 2, lost 2. Wins in regular time were worth 4 points during the 1994/95 season.)	24	8	2+2	12	39	46	38	12th	–	6R	1R	n/a		Vaughan Coveny	12
1995–96	NSL	33	5	5	23	31	63	20	11th	–	SF	1R	n/a		Mario Jermen, Tony Perinich	9
1996–97	NSL	26	8	8	10	42	48	32	10th	–	W	R16	n/a		Matt Horsley	7
1997–98	NSL	26	13	3	10	51	33	42	6th	SF			n/a		Scott Chipperfield	13
1998–99	NSL	28	8	8	12	45	52	32	10th				n/a		Anthony Surjan	8
1999–2000	NSL	34	17	9	8	72	44	60	2nd	W			n/a		Stuart Young	19
2000–01	NSL	30	18	7	5	80	40	61	2nd	W			n/a	W^{OCC}	Sasho Petrovski	21
2001–02	NSL	24	6	7	11	28	43	25	10th				n/a	canc.^{FCWC}	Stuart Young	9
2002–03	NSL	24	5	8	11	24	43	23	13th				n/a		Stuart Young	9
2003–04	NSL	24	8	5	11	34	41	29	9th				n/a		Chimaobi Nwaogazi	11
2004–05	NSWPL	22	9	4	9	34	32	31	11th	–	QF		n/a		Shane McGirr	18
2006	NSWPL	18	5	1	12	26	46	16	9th	–	4R		n/a		Adam Casey	6
2007	NSWPL	18	6	4	8	27	32	22	7th	–	W		n/a		Daniel Aliffi	12
2008	NSWPL	22	13	5	4	39	19	44	2nd	W	4R		n/a		Ilija Prenzoski	12
2009	NSWPL	22	1	2	19	20	62	5	12th	–	QF		n/a		Ilija Prenzoski	7
2010	NSWPL	22	6	4	12	32	39	22	10th	–	QF		n/a		Mark Picciolini	10
2011	NSWPL	22	9	3	10	35	36	30	7th	–	SF		n/a		Mark Picciolini	11
2012	NSWPL	22	12	1	9	41	39	37	4th	EF	4R		n/a		Mark Picciolini, Peter Simonoski, Ricky Zucco	9
2013	NPL NSW	22	3	5	14	28	53	14	12th	–	R16		n/a		Ricky Zucco	10
2014	NPL NSW	22	7	6	9	32	35	27	7th	–	SF	R32	n/a		Jordan Murray	7
2015	NPL NSW	22	9	5	8	31	36	32	5th	EF	7R		n/a		Peter Simonoski	10
2016	NPL NSW	22	5	4	13	23	37	19	11th	–	PO	R32	n/a		Nicholas Bernal	8
2017	NPL NSW	22	12	1	9	35	28	37	6th	–	4R		n/a		Yuzo Tashiro	10
2018	NPL NSW	22	7	6	9	31	34	27	9th	–	5R		n/a		Peter Simonoski	12
2019	NPL NSW	22	16	3	3	52	17	51	1st	PF	7R		n/a	W^{NPLF}	Thomas James	22
2020	NPL NSW	11	8	0	3	24	14	24	2nd	SF	canc.		n/a		Josh Bingham	6
2021	NPL NSW	17	6	4	7	23	33	22	7th	canc.	canc.	canc.	n/a			
2022	NPL NSW	22	4	8	10	37	42	20	9th	—	5R		n/a		Lachlan Scott	13
2023	NPL NSW	30	11	10	9	57	43	43	7th	—	4R		n/a		Lachlan Scott	11
2024	NPL NSW	30	13	5	12	55	41	44	7th	—	6R	–	n/a		Takumi Ofuka	12
2025	NPL NSW	30	10	10	10	42	38	40	8th	—	5R		Group Stage		Nicholas Olsen	15
2026	NPL NSW															
