= 1983 Wollongong City FC season =

Wollongong City
1983 season
- Manager: Willie Wallace
- Stadium: Ziems Park; St George Stadium; Wollongong Showground
- National Soccer League: 15th
- NSL Cup: First round
- Top goalscorer: League: Roy Cotton; Phil O'Connor (12); All: Roy Cotton (13)
- Highest home attendance: 3,482 vs. Sydney City (24 April 1984); National Soccer League
- Lowest home attendance: 1,000
- Average home league attendance: 1,871
- Biggest win: 3–1 vs. Adelaide City (H) (18 September 1983); National Soccer League; 2–0 vs. Brisbane City (A) (9 October 1983); National Soccer League
- Biggest defeat: 0–4 vs. St George-Budapest (A) (10 September 1983); National Soccer League

The 1983 season was the third in the history of Wollongong City (now Wollongong Wolves). It was also the third season in the National Soccer League. In addition to the domestic league, they also participated in the NSL Cup. Wollongong City finished 15th in their National Soccer League season, and were eliminated in the NSL Cup first round by Canberra City.

== Players ==
Note: Flags indicate national team as defined under FIFA eligibility rules; some limited exceptions apply. Players may hold more than one non-FIFA nationality.

| No. | Pos. | Nation | Player |
|---|---|---|---|
| 1 | GK | SCO | Jim Preston |
| 2 | MF | AUS | Peter Willis |
| 3 | DF | AUS | Steve Pollard |
| 4 | DF | ENG | Chris Dunleavy |
| 5 | DF | AUS | Ray Vliestra |
| 6 | DF | ENG | Jeff Ainsworth |
| 7 | DF | ENG | Alan Waldron |
| 8 | MF | ENG | John Fleming |
| 9 | MF | ENG | Roy Cotton |
| 10 | MF | AUS | Larry Gaffney |

| No. | Pos. | Nation | Player |
|---|---|---|---|
| 11 | FW | AUS | Phil O'Connor |
| 12 | | ENG | Jim McBreen |
| 13 | DF | AUS | Phil Kerr |
| 14 | FW | AUS | Glen Fontana |
| 15 | DF | AUS | David Green |
| 20 | GK | AUS | Natch Vardareff |
| — | | AUS | Phil Muhlbauer |
| — | DF | AUS | Jamie Dummett |
| — | DF | AUS | Scott Dickson |
| — | MF | AUS | Warren Baker |

=== Overview ===
| Competition | First match | Last match | Starting round | Final position | Record | | | | | | | |
| Competition | First match | Last match | Starting round | Final position | Pld | W | D | L | GF | GA | GD | Win % |
|---|---|---|---|---|---|---|---|---|---|---|---|---|
| National Soccer League | 13 March 1983 | 9 October 1983 | Matchday 1 | 15th | 30 | 4 | 15 | 11 | 41 | 55 | −14 | 13.33 |
| NSL Cup | 6 March 1983 | | First round | First round | 1 | 0 | 0 | 1 | 1 | 2 | −1 | 0.00 |
| Total | | | | | 31 | 4 | 15 | 12 | 42 | 57 | −15 | 12.90 |

Last updated: complete
Source: Competitions

=== National Soccer League ===
==== League table ====
| Pos | Team | Pld | W | D | L | GF | GA | GD | Pts |
|---|---|---|---|---|---|---|---|---|---|
| 1 | St George-Budapest (C) | 30 | 15 | 10 | 5 | 47 | 27 | +20 | 55 |
| 2 | Sydney City | 30 | 15 | 9 | 6 | 48 | 30 | +18 | 54 |
| 3 | Preston Makedonia | 30 | 15 | 7 | 8 | 47 | 32 | +15 | 52 |
| 4 | South Melbourne | 30 | 15 | 7 | 8 | 44 | 36 | +8 | 52 |
| 5 | Newcastle KB United | 30 | 14 | 7 | 9 | 45 | 26 | +19 | 49 |
| 6 | Heidelberg United | 30 | 11 | 10 | 9 | 39 | 38 | +1 | 43 |
| 7 | Sydney Olympic | 30 | 12 | 5 | 13 | 38 | 36 | +2 | 41 |
| 8 | APIA Leichhardt | 30 | 11 | 6 | 13 | 43 | 36 | +7 | 39 |
| 9 | Marconi Fairfield | 30 | 9 | 11 | 10 | 43 | 41 | +2 | 38 |
| 10 | Canberra City | 30 | 11 | 5 | 14 | 47 | 53 | −6 | 38 |
| 11 | Adelaide City | 30 | 10 | 6 | 14 | 37 | 38 | −1 | 36 |
| 12 | Footscray JUST | 30 | 9 | 9 | 12 | 25 | 42 | −17 | 36 |
| 13 | West Adelaide | 30 | 7 | 12 | 11 | 25 | 37 | −12 | 33 |
| 14 | Brisbane City | 30 | 8 | 9 | 13 | 33 | 50 | −17 | 33 |
| 15 | Wollongong City | 30 | 4 | 15 | 11 | 41 | 55 | −14 | 27 |
| 16 | Brisbane Lions | 30 | 6 | 8 | 16 | 36 | 61 | −25 | 26 |

Updated to match(es) played on unknown. Source: rsssf.com
Rules for classification: 1) points; 2) goal difference; 3) number of goals scored.
(C) Champions

==== Results by round ====
| Round | 1 | 2 | 3 | 4 | 5 | 6 | 7 | 8 | 9 | 10 | 11 | 12 | 13 | 14 | 15 | 16 | 17 | 18 | 19 | 20 | 21 | 22 | 23 | 24 | 25 | 26 | 27 | 28 | 29 | 30 |
|---|---|---|---|---|---|---|---|---|---|---|---|---|---|---|---|---|---|---|---|---|---|---|---|---|---|---|---|---|---|---|
| Ground | H | A | H | A | H | A | H | A | H | A | H | A | H | A | H | A | H | A | H | A | H | A | H | A | H | A | H | A | H | A |
| Result | D | D | D | L | D | W | L | L | D | L | L | L | D | D | D | D | D | L | D | L | L | W | D | L | D | L | W | D | D | W |
| Position | 8 | 10 | 14 | 14 | 12 | 12 | 13 | 14 | 16 | 16 | 16 | 16 | 16 | 15 | 16 | 16 | 16 | 16 | 16 | 16 | 16 | 16 | 16 | 16 | 16 | 15 | 16 | 15 | 15 | 15 |

Source: worldfootball.net
A = Away; H = Home; W = Win; D = Draw; L = Loss

==== Matches ====
| 13 March 1983 1 | Wollongong City | 1–1 | Brisbane City | Wollongong |
| | O'Connor 8' | Report | Willis 35' (o.g.) | Stadium: Ziems Park; Attendance: 1,624; Referee: Tim Davies |

| 19 March 1983 2 | Newcastle KB United | 1–1 | Wollongong City | Newcastle |
| | Lowe 85' | Report | Cotton 62' | Stadium: Newcastle International Sports Centre; Attendance: 2,024; Referee: Arthur Owens |

| 27 March 1983 3 | Wollongong City | 1–1 | APIA Leichhardt | Wollongong |
| | Fleming 19' | Report | Giampaolo 53' | Stadium: Ziems Park; Attendance: 2,114; Referee: Richard Lorenc |

| 3 April 1983 4 | Preston Makedonia | 3–2 | Wollongong City | Melbourne |
| | Campbell 28'; Lucchesi 44', 56' | Report | Cotton 65'; Fleming 82' | Stadium: B.T. Connor Reserve; Attendance: 4,500; Referee: Even Venios |

| 10 April 1983 5 | Wollongong City | 1–1 | West Adelaide | Wollongong |
| | Ainsworth 86' | Report | Atsalas 69' | Stadium: Ziems Park; Attendance: 2,374; Referee: Peter Rampley |

| 17 April 1983 6 | South Melbourne | 0–1 | Wollongong City | Melbourne |
| | | Report | O'Connor 80' | Stadium: Middle Park; Attendance: 4,500; Referee: Even Venios |

| 24 April 1983 7 | Wollongong City | 2–3 | Sydney City | Wollongong |
| 15:00 AEST | O'Connor 1', 78' | Report | Kosmina 33', 83' (pen.); Kay 48' | Stadium: Ziems Park; Attendance: 3,482; Referee: Ken Small |

| 30 April 1983 8 | Canberra City | 3–1 | Wollongong City | Canberra |
| 15:00 AEST | Bryant 20'; G. Byrne 47' (pen.); Gibson 55' | Report | O'Connor 30' | Stadium: Bruce Stadium; Attendance: 1,313; Referee: Bob Mee |

| 15 May 1983 10 | Marconi Fairfield | 5–4 | Wollongong City | Sydney |
| | Winn 40', 43', 61'; Jankovics 56'; Carbone 90' | Report | Willis 49' (pen.); Cotton 74'; Hunter 80' (o.g.); Fleming 82' | Stadium: Marconi Stadium; Attendance: 2,160; Referee: Barry Wilkinson |

| 29 May 1983 12 | Heidelberg United | 2–0 | Wollongong City | Melbourne |
| | Lea 9', 83' | Report | | Stadium: Olympic Village; Attendance: 2,000; Referee: Jim Fearn |

| 5 June 1983 13 | Wollongong City | 1–1 | Footscray JUST | Wollongong |
| | O'Connor 25' | Report | Carroll 1' | Stadium: Ziems Park; Attendance: 2,103; Referee: Richard Lorenc |

| 12 June 1983 14 | Adelaide City | 2–2 | Wollongong City | Adelaide |
| | Banfield 11' (pen.); Dods 43' | Report | McBreen 78', 83' | Stadium: Olympic Sports Field; Attendance: 1,965; Referee: Don Campbell |

| 26 June 1983 15 | Wollongong City | 0–0 | St George-Budapest | Wollongong |
| 15:00 AEST | | Report | | Stadium: Ziems Park; Attendance: 1,423; Referee: Ken Small |

| 3 July 1983 16 | West Adelaide | 1–1 | Wollongong City | Adelaide |
| | Atsalas 27' | Report | Cotton 9' | Stadium: Hindmarsh Stadium; Attendance: 950; Referee: Don Campbell |

| 6 July 1983 11 | Wollongong City | 1–2 | Sydney Olympic | Sydney |
| | Cotton 27' | Report | Paterson 15'; Patalis 66' | Stadium: St George Stadium; Attendance: 3,095; Referee: Tim Davies |

| 10 July 1983 17 | Wollongong City | 1–1 | Preston Makedonia | Wollongong |
| 15:00 AEST | Willis 44' (pen.) | Report | Odzakov 60' | Stadium: Ziems Park; Attendance: 3,014; Referee: Barry Wilkinson |

| 17 July 1983 18 | APIA Leichhardt | 4–1 | Wollongong City | Sydney |
| | Bradley 35', 76'; DeCeglie ?'; Valeri 89' | Report | O'Connor 70' | Stadium: Lambert Park; Attendance: 2,674; Referee: Arthur Owens |

| 24 July 1983 19 | Wollongong City | 2–2 | South Melbourne | Wollongong |
| | Dickson ?'; Gaffney 51' | Report | Brown 52'; Egan ?' | Stadium: Ziems Park; Attendance: 1,565; Referee: Gary Power |

| 31 July 1983 20 | Sydney City | 3–1 | Wollongong City | Sydney |
| | Gomez 58'; Souness 68', 76' (pen.) | Report | Cotton 4' | Stadium: ES Marks Athletics Field; Attendance: 768; Referee: Arthur Owens |

| 7 August 1983 21 | Wollongong City | 2–3 | Canberra City | Wollongong |
| | Ainsworth 79'; Cotton 81' | Report | Brennan 2'; Farina 28'; Gibson 90+3' | Stadium: Ziems Park; Attendance: 1,173; Referee: Ken Small |

| 14 August 1983 22 | Brisbane Lions | 1–2 | Wollongong City | Brisbane |
| | Stewart 14' | Report | Cotton 34'; O'Connor 90' | Stadium: Richlands Stadium; Attendance: 2,500; Referee: Bill Monteverde |

| 21 August 1983 23 | Wollongong City | 1–1 | Marconi Fairfield | Wollongong |
| | Dickson 79' | Report | Vardareff 80' (o.g.) | Stadium: Ziems Park; Attendance: 2,000; Referee: Richard Lorenc |

| 28 August 1983 24 | Footscray JUST | 3–1 | Wollongong City | Melbourne |
| | Paton 44', 65', 85' | Report | Cotton 10' | Stadium: Schintler Reserve; Attendance: 1,500; Referee: Evan Venios |

| 4 September 1983 25 | Wollongong City | 0–0 | Heidelberg United | Wollongong |
| | | Report | | Stadium: Ziems Park; Attendance: 1,000 |

| 10 September 1983 26 | St George-Budapest | 4–0 | Wollongong City | Sydney |
| | Slater 48'; Wilkinson 65'; Marton 71', 84' | Report | | Stadium: St George Stadium; Attendance: 1,720; Referee: Ken Small |

| 18 September 1983 27 | Wollongong City | 3–1 | Adelaide City | Wollongong |
| | O'Connor 43', 88'; Cotton 59' | Report | Mullen 75' | Stadium: Wollongong Showground; Attendance: 1,100; Referee: Barry Wilkinson |

| 25 September 1983 28 | Sydney Olympic | 3–3 | Wollongong City | Sydney |
| | Patikas 2', 69'; Patalis 17' | Report | O'Connor 24'; Willis 60', 90+2' | Stadium: St George Stadium; Attendance: 3,100; Referee: Tony Boskovic |

| 2 October 1983 29 | Wollongong City | 2–2 | Newcastle KB United | Wollongong |
| | Cotton 6'; Dunleavy 28' | Report | Lowe 70', 89' | Stadium: Wollongong Showground; Attendance: 1,000 |

| 9 October 1983 30 | Brisbane City | 0–2 | Wollongong City | Brisbane |
| | | Report | Dunleavy 9'; O'Connor 13' | Stadium: Spencer Park; Attendance: 800; Referee: Dave Nugent |

| 16 October 1983 9 | Wollongong City | 1–1 | Brisbane Lions | Wollongong |
| | Cotton 42' | Report | Wright 26' | Stadium: Wollongong Showground; Attendance: 1,000; Referee: Gary Power |

=== NSL Cup ===
| 6 March 1983 First round | Canberra City | 2–1 | Wollongong City | Queanbeyan |
| | Redmond 5'; Gibson 34' | Report | Cotton 43' | Stadium: Seiffert Oval; Attendance: 1,200; Referee: Bob Mee |

== Statistics ==
=== Appearances and goals ===
Players with no appearances not included in the list.

| No. | Pos. | Nat. | Name | National Soccer League | | NSL Cup | | Total | |
| No. | Pos. | Nat. | Name | Apps | Goals | Apps | Goals | Apps | Goals |
|---|---|---|---|---|---|---|---|---|---|
| 1 | GK | (Scotland) | Jim Preston | 17 | 0 | 1 | 0 | 18 | 0 |
| 2 | MF | (Australia) | Peter Willis | 30 | 4 | 1 | 0 | 31 | 4 |
| 3 | DF | (Australia) | Steve Pollard | 22 | 0 | 1 | 0 | 23 | 0 |
| 4 | DF | (England) | Chris Dunleavy | 22 | 2 | 1 | 0 | 23 | 2 |
| 5 | DF | (Australia) | Ray Vliestra | 23 | 0 | 1 | 0 | 24 | 0 |
| 6 | DF | (England) | Jeff Ainsworth | 30 | 2 | 1 | 0 | 31 | 2 |
| 7 | DF | (England) | Alan Waldron | 2(1) | 0 | 0 | 0 | 3 | 0 |
| 8 | MF | (England) | John Fleming | 23(1) | 3 | 1 | 0 | 25 | 3 |
| 9 | MF | (England) | Roy Cotton | 29 | 12 | 1 | 1 | 30 | 13 |
| 10 | MF | (Australia) | Larry Gaffney | 24(2) | 1 | 1 | 0 | 27 | 1 |
| 11 | FW | (Australia) | Phil O'Connor | 28 | 12 | 1 | 0 | 29 | 12 |
| 12 | | (England) | Jim McBreen | 22(1) | 2 | 1 | 0 | 24 | 2 |
| 13 | DF | (Australia) | Phil Kerr | 20(1) | 0 | 0 | 0 | 21 | 0 |
| 14 | FW | (Australia) | Glen Fontana | 0(1) | 0 | 0 | 0 | 1 | 0 |
| 15 | DF | (Australia) | David Green | 1(4) | 0 | 0 | 0 | 5 | 0 |
| 20 | GK | (Australia) | Natch Vardareff | 13 | 0 | 0 | 0 | 13 | 0 |
| — | DF | (Australia) | Warren Baker | 2 | 0 | 0 | 0 | 2 | 0 |
| — | DF | (Australia) | Scott Dickson | 11(3) | 2 | 0 | 0 | 14 | 2 |
| — | DF | (Australia) | Jamie Dummett | 6 | 0 | 0 | 0 | 6 | 0 |
| — | DF | (Australia) | Phil Muhlbauer | 5 | 0 | 0 | 0 | 5 | 0 |

=== Clean sheets ===
| Rank | No. | Pos | Nat | Name | National Soccer League | NSL Cup | Total |
|---|---|---|---|---|---|---|---|
| 1 | 1 | GK | (Scotland) | Jim Preston | 2 | 0 | 2 |
| 1 | 20 | GK | (Australia) | Natch Vardareff | 2 | 0 | 2 |
| Total | | | | | 4 | 0 | 4 |
