= 1982 Wollongong City FC season =

Wollongong City
1982 season
- Manager: Ken Morton; Chris Dunleavy; Willie Wallace
- Stadium: Wollongong Showground
- National Soccer League: 3rd
- NSL Cup: First round
- Top goalscorer: League: Phil O'Connor (17); All: Phil O'Connor (18)
- Highest home attendance: 6,341 vs. St George-Budapest (26 September 1982); National Soccer League Finals
- Lowest home attendance: 500 vs. Sydney City (14 June 1982); NSL Cup
- Average home league attendance: 3,452
- Biggest win: 3–0 vs. Canberra City (H) (4 July 1982); National Soccer League
- Biggest defeat: 0–4 vs. West Adelaide (A) (28 February 1982); National Soccer League; 1–5 vs. Sydney City (H) (14 June 1982); NSL Cup

The 1982 season was the second in the history of Wollongong City (now Wollongong Wolves). It was also the second season in the National Soccer League. In addition to the domestic league, they also participated in the NSL Cup. Wollongong City finished 3rd in their National Soccer League season and were eliminated in the Preliminary Final by St George-Budapest, and were eliminated in the NSL Cup first round by Sydney City.

== Players ==
Note: Flags indicate national team as defined under FIFA eligibility rules; some limited exceptions apply. Players may hold more than one non-FIFA nationality.

No.	Pos.	Nation	Player
1	GK	SCO	Jim Preston
2	MF	AUS	Peter Willis
3	DF	AUS	Arno Bertogna
4	DF	ENG	Chris Dunleavy
5	DF	ENG	Jeff Ainsworth
6	MF	ENG	Lee Adam
7	FW	AUS	Glen Fontana
8	MF	ENG	John Fleming
9	MF	ENG	Roy Cotton
10	MF	AUS	Larry Gaffney

No.	Pos.	Nation	Player
11	FW	AUS	Phil O'Connor
12	DF	AUS	Ray Vliestra
14	FW	AUS	Jock Morlando
15	DF	AUS	Phil Kerr
18	MF	NZL	Clive Campbell
20	GK	AUS	Natch Vardareff
—	FW	SCO	Derek Laing
—	MF	AUS	Peter Tredinnick
—	DF	ENG	Alan Waldron

== Competitions ==
=== Overview ===
Competition	First match	Last match	Starting round	Final position	Record							
Competition	First match	Last match	Starting round	Final position	Pld	W	D	L	GF	GA	GD	Win %
National Soccer League	14 February 1982	5 September 1982	Matchday 1	3rd	30	16	3	11	43	46	−3	53.33
National Soccer League Finals	19 September 1982	26 September 1982	Elimination Semi-Final	Preliminary Final	2	1	0	1	3	3	+0	50.00
NSL Cup	14 June 1982		First round	First round	1	0	0	1	1	5	−4	0.00
Total					33	17	3	13	47	54	−7	51.52

Last updated: complete
Source: Competitions

=== National Soccer League ===
==== League table ====
Pos	Team	Pld	W	D	L	GF	GA	GD	Pts	Relegation
1	Sydney City (C)	30	20	5	5	68	28	+40	45	Qualification to Finals series (Note: The Finals series was not considered the championship for the 1982 National Soccer League.)
2	St George-Budapest	30	14	8	8	47	40	+7	36	Qualification to Finals series
3	Wollongong City	30	16	3	11	43	46	−3	35	Qualification to Finals series
4	Heidelberg United	30	13	8	9	42	37	+5	34	Qualification to Finals series
5	Preston Makedonia	30	12	10	8	45	41	+4	34	
6	South Melbourne	30	11	9	10	46	37	+9	31	
7	APIA Leichhardt	30	12	7	11	49	54	−5	31	
8	Sydney Olympic	30	12	6	12	52	42	+10	30	
9	West Adelaide	30	10	8	12	44	40	+4	28	
10	Marconi Fairfield	30	12	4	14	44	43	+1	28	
11	Brisbane Lions	30	10	8	12	39	42	−3	28	
12	Newcastle KB United	30	10	7	13	43	52	−9	27	
13	Adelaide City	30	6	12	12	36	44	−8	24	
14	Footscray JUST	30	5	14	11	34	46	−12	24	
15	Canberra City	30	7	10	13	37	54	−17	24	
16	Brisbane City	30	5	11	14	32	55	−23	21	

Source: rsssf.com
Rules for classification: 1) points; 2) goal difference; 3) number of goals scored.
(C) Champions

==== Results by round ====
Round	1	2	3	4	5	6	7	8	9	10	11	12	13	14	15	16	17	18	19	20	21	22	23	24	25	26	27	28	29	30
Ground	A	H	A	H	A	H	A	H	A	H	A	H	A	H	A	A	H	A	H	A	H	A	H	A	H	A	H	A	H	H
Result	L	L	L	L	L	W	W	W	W	D	L	L	L	W	W	D	W	D	W	W	W	W	W	L	W	W	L	L	W	W
Position	15	15	16	16	16	16	16	12	11	11	13	14	14	13	13	12	10	11	8	8	7	4	3	3	3	3	4	4	4	3

Source: worldfootball.net
A = Away; H = Home; W = Win; D = Draw; L = Loss

==== Matches ====
14 February 1982 1	South Melbourne	3–0	Wollongong City	Melbourne
	Egan 53' (?); Davidson ?'	Report		Stadium: Middle Park; Attendance: 1,800; Referee: Stewart Mellings

21 February 1982 2	Wollongong City	1–3	Sydney City	Wollongong
	O'Connor 25'	Report	Patikas 5', 76'; Kosmina 86'	Stadium: Wollongong Showground; Attendance: 4,000; Referee: Ken Small

28 February 1982 3	West Adelaide	4–0	Wollongong City	Adelaide
	Honeyman 40', 55', 68'; Heys 87'	Report		Stadium: Hindmarsh Stadium; Attendance: 3,365; Referee: Jim Rossis

7 March 1982 4	Wollongong City	2–4	APIA Leichhardt	Wollongong
	Dunleavy 78'; Campbell ?'	Report	Soper 41', 47'; Bradley 44'; Morsello 66'	Stadium: Wollongong Showground; Attendance: 3,000; Referee: Tim Davies

14 March 1982 5	Brisbane City	3–1	Wollongong City	Brisbane
	Kelso 42'; Conner 59'; Carey 84'	Report	Fontana 34'	Stadium: Spencer Park; Attendance: 2,600; Referee: Bill Monteverde

21 March 1982 6	Wollongong City	2–1	Footscray JUST	Wollongong
	Cotton 9', 79'	Report	Simic 34'	Stadium: Wollongong Showground; Attendance: 3,200; Referee: Brian Fowler

28 March 1982 7	Canberra City	0–1	Wollongong City	Canberra
		Report	Cotton 56'	Stadium: Bruce Stadium; Attendance: 2,000; Referee: Ken Allen

4 April 1982 8	Wollongong City	1–0	Newcastle KB United	Wollongong
	O'Connor 35'	Report		Stadium: Wollongong Showground; Attendance: 3,890; Referee: Peter Rampley

11 April 1982 9	Heidelberg United	0–2	Wollongong City	Melbourne
		Report	Cotton 24'; O'Connor 87'	Stadium: Olympic Park; Attendance: 2,000; Referee: Evan Venios

18 April 1982 10	Wollongong City	2–2	St George-Budapest	Wollongong
	Bertogna 13'; Gaffney 15'	Report	Stone 59'; Slater 75'	Stadium: Wollongong Showground; Attendance: 6,000; Referee: Tony Boskovic

25 April 1982 11	Adelaide City	3–0	Wollongong City	Adelaide
	Melta 49'; Villani 74'; Northcote 88'	Report		Stadium: Olympic Sports Field; Attendance: 2,320; Referee: Don Campbell

2 May 1982 12	Wollongong City	0–3	Marconi Fairfield	Wollongong
		Report	Jankovics 4'; Bozanic 5'; Licata 56'	Stadium: Wollongong Showground; Attendance: 4,000; Referee: Doug Rennie

9 May 1982 13	Brisbane Lions	2–0	Wollongong City	Brisbane
	Low 16'; Williamson 85'	Report		Stadium: Richlands Stadium; Attendance: 1,200; Referee: Alan Kibbler

16 May 1982 14	Wollongong City	1–0	Preston Makedonia	Wollongong
	Cotton 1'	Report		Stadium: Wollongong Showground; Attendance: 3,176; Referee: Ken Small

23 May 1982 15	Sydney Olympic	0–1	Wollongong City	Sydney
		Report	Adam 13' (pen.)	Stadium: Pratten Park; Attendance: 7,350; Referee: Ray Davies

30 May 1982 16	Sydney City	3–3	Wollongong City	Sydney
	Murray 12'; Borges 22'; Mitchell 74'	Report	Adam 34'; Willis 56'; P. O'Connor 81'	Stadium: ES Marks Athletics Field; Attendance: 2,824; Referee: Richard Lorenc

6 June 1982 17	Wollongong City	1–0	South Melbourne	Wollongong
	O'Connor 79'	Report		Stadium: Wollongong Showground; Attendance: 3,274; Referee: Peter Rampley

13 June 1982 18	APIA Leichhardt	2–2	Wollongong City	Sydney
	Bradley 36'; Giampaolo 43' (pen.)	Report	O'Connor 53', 87'	Stadium: Lambert Park; Attendance: 3,828; Referee: Gary Power

20 June 1982 19	Wollongong City	2–0	West Adelaide	Wollongong
	Tredinnick 69'; Cotton 86'	Report		Stadium: Wollongong Showground; Attendance: 2,145; Referee: Tim Davies

27 June 1982 20	Footscray JUST	1–2	Wollongong City	Melbourne
	Ristovski 71'	Report	O'Connor 25'; Adam 59'	Stadium: Schintler Reserve; Attendance: 1,200; Referee: David Yelland

4 July 1982 21	Wollongong City	3–0	Canberra City	Wollongong
	O'Connor 53'; Adam 56' (pen.); Dunleavy 65'	Report		Stadium: Wollongong Showground; Attendance: 3,148; Referee: Gary Power

10 July 1982 22	Newcastle KB United	1–3	Wollongong City	Newcastle
	Drinkwater 37'	Report	Cotton 15', 30'; Waldron 77'	Stadium: Newcastle International Sports Centre; Attendance: 7,489; Referee: Bill Monteverde

18 July 1982 23	Wollongong City	2–1	Heidelberg United	Wollongong
	O'Connor 39', 59'	Report	Paton 31'	Stadium: Wollongong Showground; Attendance: 4,200; Referee: Tim Davies

25 July 1982 24	St George-Budapest	2–1	Wollongong City	Sydney
	Slater 51'; Ratcliffe 80'	Report	Cotton 39'	Stadium: St George Stadium; Attendance: 4,123; Referee: Bob Mee

1 August 1982 25	Wollongong City	2–1	Adelaide City	Wollongong
	O'Connor 30', 85'	Report	Nyskohus 64'	Stadium: Wollongong Showground; Attendance: 3,200; Referee: Doug Rennie

8 August 1982 26	Marconi Fairfield	1–2	Wollongong City	Sydney
	Jankovics ?'	Report	Tredinnick 12'; Cotton 49'	Stadium: Marconi Stadium; Attendance: 2,034; Referee: Ken Allen

15 August 1982 27	Wollongong City	0–2	Brisbane Lions	Wollongong
		Report	Hogg 73'; Williamson 81'	Stadium: Wollongong Showground; Attendance: 3,179; Referee: Gary Power

22 August 1982 28	Preston Makedonia	2–1	Wollongong City	Melbourne
	McMillan 61'; Ward 68'	Report	O'Connor 50'	Stadium: B.T. Connor Reserve; Attendance: 4,000; Referee: Chris Bambridge

29 August 1982 29	Wollongong City	2–1	Sydney Olympic	Wollongong
	Fontana 2'; O'Connor 9'	Report	Wilson 85'	Stadium: Wollongong Showground; Attendance: 4,122; Referee: Tim Davies

5 September 1982 30	Wollongong City	3–1	Brisbane City	Wollongong
	Fleming 62'; Fontana 77'; O'Connor 86'	Report	Kelso 57'	Stadium: Wollongong Showground; Attendance: 4,122; Referee: Tim Davies

==== Finals series ====
19 September 1982 Elimination Semi-Final	Heidelberg United	1–3	Wollongong City	Melbourne
	Paton 40' (pen.)	Report	Tredinnick 30'; O'Connor 55'; Cotton 57' (pen.)	Stadium: Middle Park; Attendance: 1,000; Referee: Tim Davies

26 September 1982 Preliminary Final	Wollongong City	0–2	St George-Budapest	Wollongong
		Report	Wilkinson 51'; Marton 76'	Stadium: Wollongong Showground; Attendance: 6,341; Referee: Chris Bambridge

=== NSL Cup ===
14 June 1982 First round	Wollongong City	1–5	Sydney City	Wollongong
	O'Connor 26'	Report	Kosmina 29', 88'; Lee 50', 80'; Borges 65'	Stadium: Memorial Park; Attendance: 500; Referee: Doug Rennie

== Statistics ==
=== Appearances and goals ===
Players with no appearances not included in the list.

No.	Pos.	Nat.	Name	National Soccer League		NSL Cup		Total	
No.	Pos.	Nat.	Name	Apps	Goals	Apps	Goals	Apps	Goals
1	GK	(Scotland)	Jim Preston	20	0	1	0	21	0
2	MF	(Australia)	Peter Willis	25(2)	1	1	0	28	1
3	DF	(Australia)	Arno Bertogna	29	1	0	0	29	1
4	DF	(England)	Chris Dunleavy	26	2	1	0	27	2
5	DF	(England)	Jeff Ainsworth	32	0	1	0	33	0
6	MF	(England)	Lee Adam	32	4	1	0	33	4
7	FW	(Australia)	Glen Fontana	13(2)	3	0	0	15	3
8	MF	(England)	John Fleming	27(1)	1	1	0	29	0
9	MF	(England)	Roy Cotton	28(2)	11	1	0	31	11
10	MF	(Australia)	Larry Gaffney	24(2)	1	1	0	27	1
11	FW	(Australia)	Phil O'Connor	31	17	1	1	32	18
12	DF	(Australia)	Ray Vliestra	7(1)	0	1	0	9	0
14	FW	(Australia)	Jock Morlando	1(2)	0	0(1)	0	4	0
15	DF	(Australia)	Phil Kerr	3(5)	0	0	0	8	0
18	MF	(New Zealand)	Clive Campbell	4	1	0	0	4	1
20	GK	(Australia)	Natch Vardareff	12	0	0	0	12	0
—	FW	(Scotland)	Derek Laing	1	0	0	0	1	0
—	MF	(Australia)	Peter Tredinnick	24	3	1	0	25	3
—	DF	(England)	Alan Waldron	13	1	0	0	13	1

=== Clean sheets ===
Rank	No.	Pos	Nat	Name	National Soccer League	NSL Cup	Total
1	1	GK	(Scotland)	Jim Preston	5	0	5
2	20	GK	(Australia)	Natch Vardareff	3	0	3
Total					8	0	8
