= 1984 Wollongong City FC season =

Wollongong City
1984 season
- Chairman: Laurie Kelly
- Manager: Adrian Alston
- Stadium: Wollongong Showground; Groundz Precinct; Towradgi Park
- National Soccer League: 12th
- NSL Cup: Group stage
- Top goalscorer: League: Peter Kotamanidis (8); All: Peter Kotamanidis (9)
- Highest home attendance: 2,500 vs. Sydney City (11 March 1984); National Soccer League
- Lowest home attendance: 224 vs. Canberra City (1 September 1984); National Soccer League
- Average home league attendance: 955
- Biggest defeat: 0–5 vs. Sydney City (A) (8 July 1984); National Soccer League

The 1984 season was the fourth in the history of Wollongong City (now Wollongong Wolves). It was also the fourth season in the National Soccer League. In addition to the domestic league, they also participated in the NSL Cup. Wollongong City finished 12th in their National Soccer League season, and were eliminated in the NSL Cup group stage.

== Players ==
Note: Flags indicate national team as defined under FIFA eligibility rules; some limited exceptions apply. Players may hold more than one non-FIFA nationality.

No.	Pos.	Nation	Player
1	GK	ENG	Ron Tilsed
2	DF	AUS	David Green
3	DF	AUS	Phil Kerr
4	DF	AUS	Zivko Hristovski
5	DF	AUS	Ray Vliestra
6	MF	AUS	Brian Condron
7	FW	AUS	Peter Beggs
8	FW	AUS	Alex Bundalo
9	FW	AUS	Glen Fontana
10	MF	AUS	Peter Kotamanidis
11	MF	AUS	Larry Gaffney
12	DF	AUS	Steve Ristevski

No.	Pos.	Nation	Player
13	FW	AUS	Peter Kukulovski
14	MF	AUS	Peter Willis
15	DF	AUS	Grant Isedale
16	MF	ENG	John Fleming
17	DF	AUS	Jamie Dummett
20	GK	AUS	Natch Vardareff
—	MF	AUS	Warren Baker
—	FW	AUS	Earl Canvin
—	FW	AUS	Tony Corradini
—	DF	AUS	Scott Dickson
—	MF	SCO	Ray Farrell
—	FW	AUS	Darren Nees

=== Overview ===
Competition	First match	Last match	Starting round	Final position	Record							
Competition	First match	Last match	Starting round	Final position	Pld	W	D	L	GF	GA	GD	Win %
National Soccer League	4 March 1984	7 October 1984	Matchday 1	12th	28	5	5	18	22	59	−37	17.86
NSL Cup	23 May 1984	3 June 1984	Group stage	Group stage	3	0	0	3	2	5	−3	0.00
Total					31	5	5	21	24	64	−40	16.13

Last updated: complete
Source: Competitions

== Competitions ==
=== National Soccer League ===
==== League table ====
Northern Conference

Pos	Team	Pld	W	D	L	GF	GA	GD	Pts	Qualification or relegation
1	Sydney City	28	17	8	3	67	21	+46	42	Qualification to Finals series
2	Sydney Olympic	28	16	8	4	61	27	+34	40	Qualification to Finals series
3	Marconi Fairfield	28	12	8	8	58	39	+19	32	Qualification to Finals series
4	APIA Leichhardt	28	12	8	8	43	35	+8	32	Qualification to Finals series
5	Blacktown City	28	12	6	10	43	48	−5	30	Qualification to Finals series
6	Sydney Croatia	28	8	11	9	32	38	−6	27	
7	Penrith City	28	8	10	10	29	41	−12	26	
8	Newcastle Rosebud United	28	11	4	13	35	52	−17	26	
9	Canberra Arrows	28	12	1	15	47	39	+8	25	
10	St George-Budapest	28	8	9	11	38	41	−3	25	
11	Melita Eagles (R)	28	8	8	12	23	38	−15	24	Relegation to the 1985 NSW State League
12	Wollongong City	28	5	5	18	22	59	−37	15	

Updated to match(es) played on unknown. Source: rsssf.com
Rules for classification: 1) points; 2) goal difference; 3) number of goals scored.
(R) Relegated

Southern Conference

Pos	Team	Pld	W	D	L	GF	GA	GD	Pts	Qualification
1	South Melbourne (C)	28	18	4	6	48	20	+28	40	Qualification to Finals series
2	Heidelberg United	28	14	7	7	37	27	+10	35	Qualification to Finals series
3	Melbourne Croatia	28	13	7	8	38	31	+7	33	Qualification to Finals series
4	Brisbane Lions	28	12	6	10	38	36	+2	30	Qualification to Finals series
5	Brunswick Juventus	28	13	4	11	36	42	−6	30	Qualification to Finals series
6	Preston Makedonia	28	11	6	11	42	33	+9	28	
7	Adelaide City	28	10	5	13	33	34	−1	25	
8	Footscray JUST	28	10	5	13	29	33	−4	25	
9	Green Gully	28	9	6	13	34	36	−2	24	
10	West Adelaide	28	8	5	15	40	52	−12	21	
11	Brisbane City	28	8	5	15	21	39	−18	21	
12	Sunshine George Cross	28	5	6	17	24	57	−33	16	

Updated to match(es) played on unknown. Source: rsssf.com
Rules for classification: 1) points; 2) goal difference; 3) number of goals scored.
(C) Champions

==== Results by round ====
Round	1	2	3	4	5	6	7	8	9	10	11	12	13	14	15	16	17	18	19	20	21	22	23	24	25	26	27	28
Ground	A	H	A	A	H	H	A	H	H	A	H	A	H	H	A	H	H	A	A	A	A	A	H	H	A	H	A	A
Result	L	L	D	L	L	W	D	D	W	L	L	L	L	L	L	W	L	D	L	L	W	L	L	L	L	L	D	W
Position	12	12	11	12	12	12	12	12	10	12	12	12	12	12	12	12	12	12	12	12	12	12	12	12	12	12	12	12

Source: worldfootball.net
A = Away; H = Home; W = Win; D = Draw; L = Loss

==== Matches ====
4 March 1984 1	Canberra City	4–0	Wollongong City	Canberra
	Farina 23', 53'; Brockbank 28'; Jones 75'	Report		Stadium: Bruce Stadium; Attendance: 2,023; Referee: Glynn Davies

11 March 1984 2	Wollongong City	1–3	Sydney City	Wollongong
	Bundalo 2'	Report	Kosmina 28'; Kerr 60' (o.g.); Boden 64'	Stadium: Wollongong Showground; Attendance: 1,706; Referee: Richard Lorenc

18 March 1984 3	Brisbane City	1–1	Wollongong City	Brisbane
	Fabrizio 72'	Report	Bundalo 84'	Stadium: Spencer Park; Attendance: 1,200; Referee: Dave Nugent

24 March 1984 4	Penrith City	3–2	Wollongong City	Sydney
	Jackson 20' (pen.); Colusso 83'; Hale 85'	Report	Bundalo 49'; Fontana 88'	Stadium: Cook Park; Attendance: 701; Referee: Terry Seacy

1 April 1984 5	Wollongong City	0–3	Sydney Olympic	Wollongong
		Report	Katholos 30', 48'; Soper 51'	Stadium: Wollongong Showground; Attendance: 2,500; Referee: Doug Rennie

10 April 1984 6	Wollongong City	2–1	Sydney Croatia	Wollongong
	Farrell 26'; Kotamanidis 86'	Report	Boden 53'	Stadium: Dapto Showground; Attendance: 1,500; Referee: Richard Lorenc

15 April 1984 7	Green Gully	1–1	Wollongong City	Melbourne
	Cannell 74' (pen.)	Report	Fontana 54'	Stadium: Green Gully Reserve; Attendance: 700; Referee: Sam Zoumas

22 April 1984 8	Wollongong City	1–1	Melita Eagles	Wollongong
	Kotamanidis 39'	Report	Duarte 70'	Stadium: Wollongong Showground; Attendance: 1,031; Referee: Bill Monteverde

23 April 1984 9	Wollongong City	1–0	Newcastle KB United	Wollongong
	Beggs 32'	Report		Stadium: Wollongong Showground; Attendance: 1,100; Referee: Richard Lorenc

4 May 1984 10	Marconi Fairfield	4–0	Wollongong City	Sydney
	Lowe 46'; McCulloch 68'; Brown 72', 90'	Report		Stadium: Marconi Stadium; Attendance: 1,545; Referee: Ken Small

13 May 1984 11	Wollongong City	1–2	St George-Budapest	Wollongong
	Kotamanidis 16'	Report		Stadium: Wollongong Showground; Attendance: 987; Referee: Graham Warne

20 May 1984 12	Blacktown City	2–0	Wollongong City	Sydney
	Selvage 10'; McLaughlin 55'	Report		Stadium: Gabbie Stadium; Attendance: 1,102; Referee: Richard Lorenc

24 June 1984 13	Wollongong City	0–1	Sydney Croatia	Wollongong
		Report	Arnold 77'	Stadium: Wollongong Showground; Attendance: 786; Referee: Gary Power

1 July 1984 14	Wollongong City	0–3	APIA Leichhardt	Wollongong
		Report	Gray ?'; Caban ?'; Bradley ?'	Stadium: Towradgi Park; Attendance: 588; Referee: Arthur Owens

8 July 1984 15	Sydney City	5–0	Wollongong City	Sydney
	Barnes 1'; Fletcher 7'; Gomez 9'; Green 62' (o.g.); Watson 87'	Report		Stadium: ES Marks Athletics Field; Attendance: 735; Referee: Graham Warne

15 July 1984 16	Wollongong City	3–2	Brisbane Lions	Wollongong
	Kotamanidis ?', ?'; Beggs ?'	Report	McDonagh ?'; Cairney ?'	Stadium: Towradgi Park; Attendance: 437; Referee: Rex Leighton

22 July 1984 17	Wollongong City	0–2	Penrith City	Wollongong
		Report	Cotton 37'; Jackson ?'	Stadium: Wollongong Showground; Attendance: 604; Referee: Peter Rampley

29 July 1984 18	Sunshine George Cross	1–1	Wollongong City	Melbourne
	Faulkner 70'	Report	Fontana 86'	Stadium: Chaplin Reserve; Attendance: 1,500; Referee: Sam Zoumas

5 August 1984 19	Sydney Olympic	3–0	Wollongong City	Sydney
	Kalantzis 10', 31'; Patalis 77'	Report		Stadium: Pratten Park; Attendance: 1,877; Referee: Ken Small

12 August 1984 20	Sydney Croatia	2–0	Wollongong City	Sydney
	Jurin 17'; Gaffney 61' (o.g.)	Report		Stadium: King Tomislav Park; Attendance: 2,852; Referee: Gary Power

19 August 1984 21	Melita Eagles	0–1	Wollongong City	Sydney
		Report	Bundalo 65'	Stadium: Melita Stadium; Attendance: 735; Referee: Tim Davies

26 August 1984 22	Canberra City	4–0	Wollongong City	Canberra
	Gibson 22', 65' (pen.); Harkins 88'; Bryant 90+1'	Report		Stadium: Bruce Stadium; Attendance: 786; Referee: Neil Murray

1 September 1984 23	Wollongong City	0–1	Canberra City	Wollongong
		Report	Gaffney 49' (o.g.)	Stadium: Groundz Precinct; Attendance: 224; Referee: Tim Davies

9 September 1984 24	Wollongong City	1–3	Marconi Fairfield	Wollongong
	Kotamanidis 90'	Report	Lowe 28'; McCulloch 39', 45'	Stadium: Wollongong Showground; Attendance: 700; Referee: Ken Small

16 September 1984 25	St George-Budapest	3–2	Wollongong City	Sydney
	Barton 6'; Slater 15'; Petkovski 90'	Report	Vlietstra 42'; Kotamanidis 55'	Stadium: St George Stadium; Attendance: 960; Referee: Peter Rampley

23 September 1984 26	Wollongong City	1–2	Blacktown City	Wollongong
	Kotamanidis 77'	Report	Sandy 25'; O'Connor 38'	Stadium: Wollongong Showground; Attendance: 600; Referee: Glyn Davies

28 September 1984 27	APIA Leichhardt	1–1	Wollongong City	Sydney
	Bradley 31'	Report	Willis 46' (pen.)	Stadium: St George Stadium; Attendance: 642; Referee: Ken Small

7 October 1984 28	Newcastle Rosebud United	1–2	Wollongong City	Newcastle
	McQuarrie 83'	Report	Fontana 10'; Kerr 80'	Stadium: Adamstown Oval; Attendance: 2,990; Referee: Rob Davies

=== NSL Cup ===
23 May 1984 Group stage	Newcastle Rosebud United	2–1	Wollongong City	Sydney
	Fontana 18' (o.g.); Senkalski 35' (pen.)	Report	Kotamindis 45'	Stadium: Marconi Stadium; Attendance: 979; Referee: Arthur Owens

27 May 1984 Group stage	St George-Budapest	2–1	Wollongong City	Sydney
	Marton 46'; Batten 83'	Report	Beggs 8'	Stadium: St George Stadium; Attendance: 200; Referee: Doug Rennie

3 June 1984 Group stage	Wollongong City	0–1	APIA Leichhardt	Wollongong
		Report	Caban 2'	Stadium: Towradgi Park; Attendance: 600; Referee: Peter Rampley

== Statistics ==
=== Appearances and goals ===
Players with no appearances not included in the list.

No.	Pos.	Nat.	Name	National Soccer League		NSL Cup		Total	
No.	Pos.	Nat.	Name	Apps	Goals	Apps	Goals	Apps	Goals
1	GK	(England)	Ron Tilsed	13	0	2	0	15	0
2	DF	(Australia)	David Green	25(1)	0	2	0	28	0
3	DF	(Australia)	Phil Kerr	16(6)	1	3	0	25	1
4	DF	(Australia)	Zivko Hristovski	10(5)	0	3	0	18	0
5	DF	(Australia)	Ray Vliestra	27	1	3	0	30	1
6	MF	(Australia)	Brian Condron	19	0	1(1)	0	21	0
7	FW	(Australia)	Peter Beggs	25	2	3	1	28	3
8	FW	(Australia)	Alex Bundalo	26(1)	4	2	0	29	4
9	FW	(Australia)	Glen Fontana	17(3)	4	2	0	22	4
10	MF	(Australia)	Peter Kotamanidis	24(4)	8	2(1)	1	31	9
11	MF	(Australia)	Larry Gaffney	24	0	1	0	25	0
12	MF	(Australia)	Steve Ristevski	1(1)	0	0	0	2	0
13	FW	(Australia)	Peter Kukulovski	1(3)	0	0	0	4	0
14	MF	(Australia)	Peter Willis	26	1	3	0	29	1
15	DF	(Australia)	Grant Isedale	2(1)	0	3	0	6	0
16	MF	(England)	John Fleming	21	0	0	0	21	0
17	DF	(Australia)	Jamie Dummett	4	0	0	0	4	0
20	GK	(Australia)	Natch Vardareff	15	0	1	0	16	0
—	MF	(Australia)	Warren Baker	0(1)	0	0	0	1	0
—	FW	(Australia)	Earl Canvin	0(1)	0	0	0	1	0
—	FW	(Australia)	Tony Corradini	2(1)	0	0(2)	0	5	0
—	DF	(Australia)	Scott Dickson	2	0	3	0	5	0
—	MF	(Scotland)	Ray Farrell	2(4)	1	0	0	6	1
—	FW	(Australia)	Darren Nees	0(3)	0	0(1)	0	4	0

=== Clean sheets ===
Rank	No.	Pos	Nat	Name	National Soccer League	NSL Cup	Total
1	1	GK	(England)	Ron Tilsed	1	0	1
1	20	GK	(Australia)	Natch Vardareff	1	0	1
Total					2	0	2
