= 1985 Wollongong City FC season =

Wollongong City
1985 season
- Chairman: Laurie Kelly
- Manager: Adrian Alston
- Stadium: Wollongong Showground
- National Soccer League: 10th
- NSL Cup: Second round
- Top goalscorer: League: Pat Brodnik (6); All: Pat Brodnik (6)
- Highest home attendance: 2,209 vs. Sydney Croatia (17 March 1985); National Soccer League
- Lowest home attendance: 502 vs. Newcastle Rosebud United (22 May 1985); National Soccer League
- Average home league attendance: 1,022
- Biggest win: 3–0 vs. Blacktown City (H) (18 August 1985); National Soccer League
- Biggest defeat: 1–6 vs. Marconi Fairfield (A) (21 April 1985); National Soccer League

The 1985 season was the fifth in the history of Wollongong City (now Wollongong Wolves). It was also the fifth season in the National Soccer League. In addition to the domestic league, they also participated in the NSL Cup. Wollongong City finished 10th in their National Soccer League season, and were eliminated in the NSL Cup second round by Newcastle Rosebud United.

== Players ==
Note: Flags indicate national team as defined under FIFA eligibility rules; some limited exceptions apply. Players may hold more than one non-FIFA nationality.

No.	Pos.	Nation	Player
2	DF	AUS	David Green
4	DF	AUS	Zivko Hristovski
5	DF	AUS	Ray Vliestra
6	DF	AUS	Phil Kerr
7	FW	AUS	Bernie Godzik
8	FW	AUS	Alex Bundalo
9	MF	AUS	Peter Willis
10	MF	AUS	Peter Kotamanidis
12		YUG	Dez Marton
14	DF	AUS	Scott Dickson
16	FW	AUS	Pat Brodnik
17	MF	AUS	Rade Stefanovski

No.	Pos.	Nation	Player
19	MF	AUS	Larry Gaffney
20	GK	AUS	Sean Billington
—	MF	AUS	Craig Baker
—	MF	AUS	Brian Condron
—	FW	AUS	Tony Corradini
—	FW	AUS	Domenic Giannone
—	MF	AUS	Phil Matias
—		AUS	Peter Ruskin
—	GK	AUS	Natch Vardareff
—	GK	AUS	Kiri Velkov
—	MF	AUS	Anthony Welbourne

=== Overview ===
Competition	First match	Last match	Starting round	Final position	Record							
Competition	First match	Last match	Starting round	Final position	Pld	W	D	L	GF	GA	GD	Win %
National Soccer League	10 March 1985	18 August 1985	Matchday 1	10th	22	5	6	11	29	46	−17	22.73
NSL Cup	3 March 1985	20 March 1985	First round	Second round	2	1	0	1	5	5	+0	50.00
Total					24	6	6	12	34	51	−17	25.00

Last updated: complete
Source: Competitions

== Competitions ==
=== National Soccer League ===
==== League table ====
Northern Conference

Pos	Team	Pld	W	D	L	GF	GA	GD	Pts	Qualification or relegation
1	Sydney City	22	15	5	2	42	19	+23	35	Qualification to Finals series
2	Sydney Croatia	22	14	5	3	50	22	+28	33	Qualification to Finals series
3	Marconi Fairfield	22	11	7	4	44	23	+21	29	Qualification to Finals series
4	Sydney Olympic	22	12	3	7	29	25	+4	27	Qualification to Finals series
5	St George-Budapest	22	7	8	7	31	26	+5	22	Qualification to Finals series
6	Canberra City	22	8	6	8	33	35	−2	22	
7	Inter Monaro	22	7	6	9	29	37	−8	20	
8	Blacktown City	22	7	4	11	30	34	−4	18	
9	APIA Leichhardt	22	7	2	13	20	34	−14	16	
10	Wollongong City	22	5	6	11	29	46	−17	16	
11	Penrith City (R)	22	4	6	12	24	35	−11	14	Relegation to the 1986 NSW State League
12	Newcastle Rosebud United	22	4	4	14	20	45	−25	12	

Source: rsssf.com
Rules for classification: 1) points; 2) goal difference; 3) number of goals scored.
(R) Relegated

Southern Conference

Pos	Team	Pld	W	D	L	GF	GA	GD	Pts	Qualification
1	South Melbourne	22	14	5	3	39	21	+18	33	Qualification to Finals series
2	Brunswick Juventus (C)	22	11	7	4	33	19	+14	29	Qualification to Finals series
3	Heidelberg United	22	10	7	5	29	17	+12	27	Qualification to Finals series
4	Melbourne Croatia	22	9	6	7	29	21	+8	24	Qualification to Finals series
5	Preston Makedonia	22	9	6	7	30	28	+2	24	Qualification to Finals series
6	Sunshine George Cross	22	8	7	7	25	22	+3	23	
7	Brisbane Lions	22	9	4	9	29	29	0	22	
8	Green Gully	22	6	6	10	24	29	−5	18	
9	Adelaide City	22	6	6	10	29	35	−6	18	
10	West Adelaide	22	6	5	11	24	37	−13	17	
11	Brisbane City	22	6	5	11	25	42	−17	17	
12	Footscray JUST	22	5	2	15	25	41	−16	12	

Updated to match(es) played on unknown. Source: rsssf.com
Rules for classification: 1) points; 2) goal difference; 3) number of goals scored.
(C) Champions

==== Results by round ====
Round	1	2	3	4	5	6	7	8	9	10	11	12	13	14	15	16	17	18	19	20	21	22
Ground	A	H	A	H	A	H	A	H	A	H	A	H	A	H	A	H	A	H	A	H	A	H
Result	L	W	L	W	L	L	L	L	D	L	L	W	L	D	D	D	L	L	W	D	D	W
Position	10	6	9	8	9	10	11	12	11	11	12	12	12	12	12	12	12	12	11	10	10	10

Source: worldfootball.net
A = Away; H = Home; W = Win; D = Draw; L = Loss

==== Matches ====
10 March 1985 1	APIA Leichhardt	4–2	Wollongong City	Sydney
	Colagiuri 2', 14'; Willis 55' (o.g.); Genovese 80'	Report	Bundalo 56'; Giannone 73'	Stadium: Lambert Park; Attendance: 2,217; Referee: Ken Small

17 March 1985 2	Wollongong City	2–1	Sydney Croatia	Wollongong
	Godzik 46'; M. Kovacic 72' (o.g.)	Report	Patikas 70'	Stadium: Wollongong Showground; Attendance: 2,209; Referee: Terry Seacy

23 March 1985 3	Sydney City	5–2	Wollongong City	Sydney
	Farina 20', 65', 68'; O'Connor 29'; Watson 47'	Report	Willis 11'; Brodnik 31'	Stadium: ES Marks Athletics Field; Attendance: 500; Referee: Rob Davies

31 March 1985 4	Wollongong City	4–2	Inter Monaro	Wollongong
	Hristovski 38'; Kotamanidis 50'; Giannone 63'; Brodnik 85'	Report	Thamnidis 42'; Dragicevic 69'	Stadium: Wollongong Showground; Attendance: 740; Referee: Gary Power

7 April 1985 5	Penrith City	3–0	Wollongong City	Sydney
	Hunter 56'; Ainsworth 61'; Easthorpe 80'	Report		Stadium: Cook Park; Attendance: 357; Referee: Richard Lorenc

14 April 1985 6	Wollongong City	1–2	Sydney Olympic	Wollongong
	Giannone 70'	Report	Svinos 7'; Kalantzis 70'	Stadium: Wollongong Showground; Attendance: 1,375; Referee: Tim Davies

21 April 1985 7	Marconi Fairfield	6–1	Wollongong City	Sydney
	Brown 6', 84', 90'; Mason 57'; Lowe 82'; Gray 87'	Report	Dickson 47'	Stadium: Marconi Stadium; Attendance: 21,136; Referee: Graham Warne

5 May 1985 9	St George-Budapest	1–1	Wollongong City	Sydney
	Bozanic 65'	Report	Hristovski 10'	Stadium: St George Stadium; Attendance: 675; Referee: Gary Power

12 May 1985 10	Wollongong City	0–2	Canberra City	Wollongong
		Report	English 54', 62'	Stadium: Wollongong Showground; Attendance: 982; Referee: Richard Lorenc

19 May 1985 11	Blacktown City	3–0	Wollongong City	Sydney
	O'Connor 40', 71'; McKie 43'	Report		Stadium: Gabbie Stadium; Attendance: 825; Referee: Roger Doenau

22 May 1985 8	Wollongong City	1–2	Newcastle Rosebud United	Wollongong
	Willis 67'	Report	Owens 55'; Todd 75'	Stadium: Wollongong Showground; Attendance: 502; Referee: Arthur Owens

26 May 1985 12	Wollongong City	1–0	APIA Leichhardt	Wollongong
	Dickson 66'	Report		Stadium: Wollongong Showground; Attendance: 803; Referee: Ken Small

10 June 1985 14	Wollongong City	1–1	Sydney City	Wollongong
	Hristovski 83'	Report	Lee 42'	Stadium: Wollongong Showground; Attendance: 1,200; Referee: Vince Celestino

16 June 1985 15	Inter Monaro	1–1	Wollongong City	Queanbeyan
	Carbone 3'	Report	Bundalo 47'	Stadium: Seiffert Oval; Attendance: 650; Referee: Rob Davies

22 June 1985 13	Sydney Croatia	5–1	Wollongong City	Sydney
	Krncevic 4', 8'; Jurin ?'; Arnold ?'; Patikas ?'	Report	Willis 14' (pen.)	Stadium: King Tomislav Park; Attendance: 3,463; Referee: Terry Seacy

23 June 1985 16	Wollongong City	0–0	Penrith City	Wollongong
		Report		Stadium: Wollongong Showground; Attendance: 683; Referee: Peter Rampley

30 June 1985 17	Sydney Olympic	1–0	Wollongong City	Sydney
	Polias 87'	Report		Stadium: Pratten Park; Attendance: 3,489; Referee: Tim Davies

7 July 1985 18	Wollongong City	2–3	Marconi Fairfield	Wollongong
	Marton 35'; Brodnik 43'	Report	Lowe 51' (pen.), 58', 80' (pen.)	Stadium: Wollongong Showground; Attendance: 1,076; Referee: Graham Warne

13 July 1985 19	Newcastle Rosebud United	1–3	Wollongong City	Newcastle
	Senkalski 51'	Report	Brodnik 24'; Stefanovski 73'; Godzik 79'	Stadium: Adamstown Oval; Attendance: 1,310; Referee: Roger Doenau

21 July 1985 20	Wollongong City	2–2	St George-Budapest	Wollongong
	Stefanovski 72'; Willis 80' (pen.)	Report	Morgan 30'; Koczka 40'	Stadium: Wollongong Showground; Attendance: 600; Referee: Ken Small

28 July 1985 21	Canberra City	1–1	Wollongong City	Canberra
	English 53'	Report	Bundalo 68'	Stadium: Bruce Stadium; Attendance: 947; Referee: Jim Reeves

18 August 1985 22	Wollongong City	3–0	Blacktown City	Wollongong
	Brodnik 29', 84'; Godzik 36'	Report		Stadium: Wollongong Showground; Attendance: 1,069; Referee: Tim Davies

=== NSL Cup ===
3 March 1985 First round	Wollongong City	3–2	Sydney Croatia	Wollongong
	Giannone 22'; Kerr 28'; Godzik 36'	Report	Patikas 63'; Vidaic 78'	Stadium: Wollongong Showground; Attendance: 1,500; Referee: Roger Doenau

20 March 1985 Second round	Newcastle Rosebud United	3–2	Wollongong City	Newcastle
	D. Jones 43', 63'; McQuarrie 65'	Report	Kotamanidis 13'; Giannone 19'	Stadium: Adamstown Oval; Attendance: 1,073; Referee: Richard Lorenc

== Statistics ==
=== Appearances and goals ===
Players with no appearances not included in the list.

No.	Pos.	Nat.	Name	National Soccer League		NSL Cup		Total	
No.	Pos.	Nat.	Name	Apps	Goals	Apps	Goals	Apps	Goals
2	DF	(Australia)	David Green	21	0	2	0	23	0
4	DF	(Australia)	Zivko Hristovski	19	3	2	0	21	3
5	DF	(Australia)	Ray Vliestra	10	0	0	0	10	0
6	DF	(Australia)	Phil Kerr	12(3)	0	2	1	17	1
7	FW	(Australia)	Bernie Godzik	20(1)	3	1	1	22	4
8	FW	(Australia)	Alex Bundalo	21	3	2	0	23	3
9	MF	(Australia)	Peter Willis	22	4	2	0	24	4
10	MF	(Australia)	Peter Kotamanidis	17(5)	1	2	1	24	2
12	FW	(Socialist Federal Republic of Yugoslavia)	Dez Marton	11	1	0	0	11	1
14	DF	(Australia)	Scott Dickson	20	2	2	0	22	2
16	FW	(Australia)	Pat Brodnik	10(8)	6	1(1)	0	20	6
17	MF	(Australia)	Rade Stefanovski	7(6)	0	0	0	13	0
19	MF	(Australia)	Larry Gaffney	13(1)	0	0	0	14	0
20	GK	(Australia)	Sean Billington	10	0	0	0	10	0
—	MF	(Australia)	Craig Baker	0(1)	0	0	0	1	0
—	MF	(Australia)	Brian Condron	6(2)	0	0(2)	0	10	0
—	FW	(Australia)	Tony Corradini	0(1)	0	0	0	1	0
—	FW	(Australia)	Domenic Giannone	11(1)	3	2	2	14	5
—	MF	(Australia)	Phil Matias	4	0	2	0	6	0
—		(Australia)	Peter Ruskin	0(1)	0	0	0	1	0
—	GK	(Australia)	Natch Vardareff	6	0	2	0	8	0
—	GK	(Australia)	Kiri Velkov	6	0	0	0	6	0
—	MF	(Australia)	Anthony Welbourne	0(1)	0	0	0	1	0

=== Clean sheets ===
Rank	No.	Pos	Nat	Name	National Soccer League	NSL Cup	Total
1	—	GK	(Australia)	Sean Billington	2	0	2
2	—	GK	(Australia)	Kiri Velkov	1	0	1
Total					3	0	3
