= 1981 Wollongong City FC season =

Wollongong City
1981 season
- Manager: Ken Morton
- Stadium: Wollongong Showground; Memorial Park; Woonona Oval
- National Soccer League: 11th
- NSL Cup: First round
- Top goalscorer: League: Jim McBreen (7); All: Jim McBreen (8)
- Highest home attendance: 6,930 vs. Preston Makedonia (26 April 1981); National Soccer League
- Lowest home attendance: 815 vs. Downer Olympic (21 March 1981); NSL Cup
- Average home league attendance: 4,745
- Biggest win: 4–0 vs. Marconi Fairfield (H) (6 September 1981); National Soccer League
- Biggest defeat: 0–6 vs. Preston Makedonia (A) (2 August 1981); National Soccer League

The 1981 season was the first in the history of Wollongong City Football Club (now Wollongong Wolves). It was also the first season in the National Soccer League. In addition to the domestic league, they also participated in the NSL Cup. Wollongong City finished 11th in their National Soccer League season, and were eliminated in the NSL Cup second round by APIA Leichhardt.

== Players ==
Note: Flags indicate national team as defined under FIFA eligibility rules; some limited exceptions apply. Players may hold more than one non-FIFA nationality.

| No. | Pos. | Nation | Player |
|---|---|---|---|
| 1 | GK | SCO | Jim Preston |
| 2 | MF | AUS | Peter Willis |
| 3 | DF | AUS | Tony Dickinson |
| 4 | DF | ENG | Chris Dunleavy (Captain) |
| 5 | DF | ENG | Jeff Ainsworth |
| 6 | MF | ENG | Lee Adam |
| 7 | FW | AUS | Glen Fontana |
| 8 | MF | ENG | John Fleming |
| 9 | MF | NZL | Clive Campbell |
| 10 | MF | ENG | John Lathan |

| No. | Pos. | Nation | Player |
|---|---|---|---|
| 11 | FW | AUS | Jock Morlando |
| 13 | FW | NZL | Brian Turner |
| 14 | DF | NZL | Willem de Graaf |
| 15 | DF | AUS | Ray Mohring |
| 16 | MF | AUS | Peter Tredinnick |
| 17 | | ENG | Jim McBreen |
| 18 | MF | ENG | Ken Morton |
| 19 | MF | AUS | Paul Kay |
| 22 | GK | AUS | Natch Vardareff |
| — | DF | AUS | Arno Bertogna |

== Competitions ==
=== Overview ===
| Competition | First match | Last match | Starting round | Final position | Record | | | | | | | |
| Competition | First match | Last match | Starting round | Final position | Pld | W | D | L | GF | GA | GD | Win % |
|---|---|---|---|---|---|---|---|---|---|---|---|---|
| National Soccer League | 15 February 1981 | 13 September 1981 | Matchday 1 | 11th | 30 | 8 | 12 | 10 | 35 | 39 | −4 | 26.67 |
| NSL Cup | 21 March 1981 | 6 May 1981 | First round | Second round | 2 | 1 | 0 | 1 | 5 | 4 | +1 | 50.00 |
| Total | | | | | 32 | 9 | 12 | 11 | 40 | 43 | −3 | 28.13 |

Last updated: complete
Source: Competitions

=== National Soccer League ===
==== League table ====
| Pos | Team | Pld | W | D | L | GF | GA | GD | Pts | Relegation |
|---|---|---|---|---|---|---|---|---|---|---|
| 1 | Sydney City (C) | 30 | 19 | 5 | 6 | 59 | 30 | +29 | 43 | |
| 2 | South Melbourne | 30 | 13 | 13 | 4 | 41 | 27 | +14 | 39 | |
| 3 | Brisbane City | 30 | 12 | 11 | 7 | 37 | 25 | +12 | 35 | |
| 4 | APIA Leichhardt | 30 | 12 | 11 | 7 | 39 | 33 | +6 | 35 | |
| 5 | Canberra City | 30 | 13 | 7 | 10 | 41 | 32 | +9 | 33 | |
| 6 | Brisbane Lions | 30 | 11 | 11 | 8 | 41 | 33 | +8 | 33 | |
| 7 | Adelaide City | 30 | 13 | 6 | 11 | 46 | 42 | +4 | 32 | |
| 8 | Heidelberg United | 30 | 12 | 7 | 11 | 48 | 40 | +8 | 31 | |
| 9 | Sydney Olympic | 30 | 11 | 9 | 10 | 46 | 46 | 0 | 31 | |
| 10 | Newcastle KB United | 30 | 11 | 8 | 11 | 41 | 41 | 0 | 30 | |
| 11 | Wollongong City | 30 | 8 | 12 | 10 | 35 | 39 | −4 | 28 | |
| 12 | Preston Makedonia | 30 | 9 | 7 | 14 | 39 | 41 | −2 | 25 | |
| 13 | Footscray JUST | 30 | 9 | 7 | 14 | 32 | 48 | −16 | 25 | |
| 14 | Marconi Fairfield | 30 | 9 | 7 | 14 | 23 | 45 | −22 | 25 | |
| 15 | Blacktown City (R) | 30 | 6 | 9 | 15 | 32 | 47 | −15 | 21 | Relegated to the 1982 NSW State League |
| 16 | West Adelaide | 30 | 5 | 4 | 21 | 26 | 57 | −31 | 14 | |

Updated to match(es) played on unknown. Source: rsssf.com
Rules for classification: 1) points; 2) goal difference; 3) number of goals scored.
(C) Champions; (R) Relegated

==== Results by round ====
| Round | 1 | 2 | 3 | 4 | 5 | 6 | 7 | 8 | 9 | 10 | 11 | 12 | 26 | 14 | 15 | 16 | 17 | 18 | 19 | 13 | 20 | 21 | 22 | 23 | 24 | 25 | 27 | 28 | 29 | 30 |
|---|---|---|---|---|---|---|---|---|---|---|---|---|---|---|---|---|---|---|---|---|---|---|---|---|---|---|---|---|---|---|
| Ground | H | A | H | A | H | A | H | A | A | H | A | H | A | H | A | H | A | H | A | A | H | A | H | H | A | H | H | A | H | A |
| Result | W | W | W | D | D | D | D | D | L | D | W | D | L | L | D | L | D | D | W | L | D | L | W | D | L | W | L | L | W | L |
| Position | 2 | 1 | 1 | 1 | 2 | 2 | 2 | 2 | 3 | 4 | 3 | 4 | 8 | 8 | 9 | 9 | 9 | 9 | 9 | 5 | 9 | 9 | 8 | 8 | 9 | 8 | 10 | 11 | 11 | 11 |
| Points | 2 | 4 | 6 | 7 | 8 | 9 | 10 | 11 | 11 | 12 | 14 | 15 | 15 | 15 | 16 | 16 | 17 | 18 | 20 | 20 | 21 | 21 | 23 | 24 | 24 | 26 | 26 | 26 | 28 | 28 |

Source: worldfootball.net
A = Away; H = Home; W = Win; D = Draw; L = Loss

==== Matches ====
| 15 February 1981 1 | Wollongong City | 3–1 | Sydney Olympic | Wollongong |
| 14:00 AEDT | McBreen 35'; Campbell 55', 62' | Report | | Stadium: Wollongong Showground; Attendance: 5,904; Referee: Tony Boskovic |

| 22 February 1981 2 | Heidelberg United | 0–3 | Wollongong City | Melbourne |
| | | Report | McBreen 34'; Morton 51'; Dunleavy 72' | Stadium: Olympic Park No. 2 Attendance: 5,200; Referee: David Yelland |

| 1 March 1981 3 | Wollongong City | 2–1 | Footscray JUST | Wollongong |
| 15:00 AEST | Tredinnick 71'; Dunleavy 85' | Report | | Stadium: Wollongong Showground; Attendance: 5,317; Referee: Tim Davies |

| 8 March 1981 4 | Brisbane Lions | 1–1 | Wollongong City | Brisbane |
| | Ferris 44' | Report | Adam 27' (pen.) | Stadium: Lions Stadium; Attendance: 1,970; Referee: Jack Wood |

| 15 March 1981 5 | Wollongong City | 1–1 | Blacktown City | Wollongong |
| 15:00 AEST | Fleming 41' | Report | Culina 86' | Stadium: Wollongong Showground; Attendance: 5,637; Referee: Richard Lorenc |

| 29 March 1981 6 | Newcastle KB United | 1–1 | Wollongong City | Newcastle |
| 14:30 AEST | Drinkwater 73' | Report | Fontana 37' | Stadium: Newcastle International Sports Centre; Attendance: 7,567; Referee: Doug Rennie |

| 5 April 1981 7 | Wollongong City | 1–1 | APIA Leichhardt | Wollongong |
| 15:00 AEST | Tredinnick 30' | Report | Kafka 5' | Stadium: Wollongong Showground; Attendance: 6,087; Referee: Gary Power |

| 12 April 1981 8 | West Adelaide | 0–0 | Wollongong City | Adelaide |
| | | Report | | Stadium: Hindmarsh Stadium; Attendance: 3,100; Referee: Graham Neal |

| 19 April 1981 9 | South Melbourne | 1–0 | Wollongong City | Melbourne |
| | Stevenson 72' | Report | | Stadium: Middle Park; Attendance: 7,000; Referee: Chris Bambridge |

| 26 April 1981 10 | Wollongong City | 2–2 | Preston Makedonia | Wollongong |
| 15:00 AEST | Fleming 46'; Fontana 49' | Report | Ollerton 7'; Little 75' | Stadium: Wollongong Showground; Attendance: 6,930; Referee: Doug Rennie |

| 3 May 1981 11 | Adelaide City | 1–2 | Wollongong City | Adelaide |
| | Mitchell 34' | Report | Fontana 44'; McBreen 72' | Stadium: Olympic Sports Field; Attendance: 3,100; Referee: Stewart Mellings |

| 10 May 1981 12 | Wollongong City | 0–0 | Brisbane City | Wollongong |
| 15:00 AEST | | Report | | Stadium: Wollongong Showground; Attendance: 5,309; Referee: Tim Davies |

| 17 May 1981 26 | Brisbane City | 1–0 | Wollongong City | Brisbane |
| | P. Wilkinson 17' | Report | | Stadium: Spencer Park; Attendance: 4,800; Referee: Dave Nugent |

| 24 May 1981 14 | Wollongong City | 0–1 | Canberra City | Wollongong |
| 15:00 AEST | | Report | Valeri 78' | Stadium: Wollongong Showground; Attendance: 3,015; Referee: Richard Lorenc |

| 31 May 1981 15 | Marconi Fairfield | 1–1 | Wollongong City | Sydney |
| 15:00 AEST | Krncevic 43' | Report | Adam 21' | Stadium: Marconi Stadium; Attendance: 2,400; Referee: Henry Witschge |

| 7 June 1981 16 | Wollongong City | 3–4 | Heidelberg United | Wollongong |
| | Lathan 20'; Adam 87'; McBreen 88' | Report | Cole 29', 73'; Paton 51'; McGrory 65' | Stadium: Wollongong Showground; Attendance: 4,371; Referee: Doug Rennie / Barry Wilkinson |

| 14 June 1981 17 | Footscray JUST | 1–1 | Wollongong City | Melbourne |
| 15:00 AEST | Verweij 78' | Report | Adam 87' (pen.) | Stadium: Schintler Reserve; Attendance: 2,000; Referee: Bobby Kerr |

| 21 June 1981 18 | Wollongong City | 1–1 | Brisbane Lions | Wollongong |
| | McBreen 62' | Report | Low 40' | Stadium: Wollongong Showground; Attendance: 3,748; Referee: Gary Power |

| 28 June 1981 19 | Blacktown City | 0–1 | Wollongong City | Sydney |
| | | Report | Tredinnick 76' | Stadium: Gabbie Stadium; Attendance: 2,965; Referee: Jim Reeves |

| 1 July 1981 13 | Sydney City | 1–0 | Wollongong City | Sydney |
| | Cant 68' | Report | | Stadium: St George Stadium; Attendance: 1,500; Referee: Peter Rampley |

| 5 July 1981 20 | Wollongong City | 0–0 | Newcastle KB United | Wollongong |
| | | Report | | Stadium: Wollongong Showground; Attendance: 2,100; Referee: Ken Small |

| 12 July 1981 21 | APIA Leichhardt | 1–0 | Wollongong City | Sydney |
| | Butler 14' | Report | | Stadium: Lambert Park; Attendance: 4,222; Referee: Peter Rampley |

| 19 July 1981 22 | Wollongong City | 2–1 | West Adelaide | Wollongong |
| | Campbell 49'; Fontana 60' | Report | Smythe 53' | Stadium: Wollongong Showground; Attendance: 4,364; Referee: Henry Witschge |

| 26 July 1981 23 | Wollongong City | 1–1 | South Melbourne | Wollongong |
| | de Graaf 8' | Report | Cummings 40' | Stadium: Wollongong Showground; Attendance: 4,723; Referee: Doug Rennie |

| 2 August 1981 24 | Preston Makedonia | 6–0 | Wollongong City | Melbourne |
| | Lucchesi 11', 23'; Whittle 59'; Brown 75'; Fontana 80' (o.g.); Cullen 89' | Report | | Stadium: B.T. Connor Reserve; Attendance: 3,000; Referee: Stewart Mellings |

| 9 August 1981 25 | Wollongong City | 4–1 | Adelaide City | Wollongong |
| | Bertogna 3'; Fleming 10'; McBreen 44'; Lathan 48' | Report | Northcote 65' | Stadium: Wollongong Showground; Attendance: 3,879; Referee: Tony Boskovic |

| 23 August 1981 27 | Wollongong City | 0–5 | Sydney City | Wollongong |
| | | Report | Boden 5'; Kosmina 57'; Souness 65', 83'; Barnes 88' | Stadium: Wollongong Showground; Attendance: 3,974; Referee: Tim Davies |

| 30 August 1981 28 | Canberra City | 2–0 | Wollongong City | Canberra |
| | Valeri 6' (pen.); Gibson 82' | Report | | Stadium: Bruce Stadium; Attendance: 2,500; Referee: Bob Mee |

| 6 September 1981 29 | Wollongong City | 4–0 | Marconi Fairfield | Wollongong |
| | McBreen 60'; Tredinnick 74'; Lathan 79', 89' | Report | | Stadium: Wollongong Showground; Attendance: 5,819; Referee: Tony Boskovic |

| 13 September 1981 30 | Sydney Olympic | 2–1 | Wollongong City | Sydney |
| | Ziras 70' (pen.); Raskopoulos 84' | Report | Campbell 18' | Stadium: Pratten Park; Attendance: 4,500; Referee: Richard Lorenc |

=== NSL Cup ===
| 21 March 1981 First round | Wollongong City | 3–0 | Downer Olympic | Wollongong |
| | Lathan 30'; Campbell 18'; Adam 90' (pen.) | Report | | Stadium: Memorial Park; Attendance: 815; Referee: Ken Small |

| 6 May 1981 Second round | Wollongong City | 2–4 (a.e.t.) | APIA Leichhardt | Wollongong |
| | McBreen 77'; Tredinnick 90' | Report | O'Connor 75'; Soper 89', 119'; Kafka 100' | Stadium: Woonona Oval; Referee: Tony Boskovic |

== Statistics ==
=== Appearances and goals ===
Includes all competitions. Players with no appearances not included in the list.

| No. | Pos. | Nat. | Player | National Soccer League | | NSL Cup | | Total | |
| No. | Pos. | Nat. | Player | Apps | Goals | Apps | Goals | Apps | Goals |
|---|---|---|---|---|---|---|---|---|---|
| 1 | GK | (Scotland) | Jim Preston | 11+1 | 0 | 2 | 0 | 14 | 0 |
| 2 | MF | (Australia) | Peter Willis | 13 | 0 | 1 | 0 | 14 | 0 |
| 3 | DF | (Australia) | Tony Dickinson | 2 | 0 | 0 | 0 | 2 | 0 |
| 4 | DF | (England) | Chris Dunleavy | 30 | 2 | 2 | 0 | 32 | 2 |
| 5 | DF | (England) | Jeff Ainsworth | 26 | 0 | 2 | 0 | 28 | 0 |
| 6 | MF | (England) | Lee Adam | 29 | 4 | 2 | 1 | 31 | 5 |
| 7 | FW | (Australia) | Glen Fontana | 19+2 | 4 | 1 | 0 | 22 | 4 |
| 8 | MF | (England) | John Fleming | 29 | 3 | 2 | 0 | 31 | 3 |
| 9 | MF | (New Zealand) | Clive Campbell | 17+6 | 4 | 1 | 1 | 24 | 5 |
| 10 | MF | (New Zealand) | John Lathan | 27+1 | 4 | 2 | 1 | 30 | 5 |
| 11 | FW | (Australia) | Jock Morlando | 6+2 | 0 | 0+1 | 0 | 9 | 0 |
| 13 | FW | (New Zealand) | Brian Turner | 5+2 | 0 | 1 | 0 | 8 | 0 |
| 14 | DF | (New Zealand) | Willem de Graaf | 22+3 | 1 | 2 | 0 | 27 | 1 |
| 15 | DF | (Australia) | Ray Mohring | 0+2 | 0 | 0 | 0 | 2 | 0 |
| 16 | MF | (Australia) | Peter Tredinnick | 30 | 4 | 2 | 1 | 32 | 5 |
| 17 | — | (England) | Jim McBreen | 25+1 | 7 | 2 | 1 | 28 | 8 |
| 18 | MF | (England) | Ken Morton | 1+7 | 1 | 0+1 | 0 | 9 | 1 |
| 19 | MF | (Australia) | Paul Kay | 4+2 | 0 | 0+1 | 0 | 7 | 0 |
| 22 | GK | (Australia) | Natch Vardareff | 19+1 | 0 | 1 | 0 | 20 | 0 |
| — | DF | (Australia) | Arno Bertogna | 15 | 1 | 0 | 0 | 15 | 1 |

=== Clean sheets ===
Includes all competitions. The list is sorted by squad number when total clean sheets are equal. Numbers in parentheses represent games where both goalkeepers participated and both kept a clean sheet; the number in parentheses is awarded to the goalkeeper who was substituted on, whilst a full clean sheet is awarded to the goalkeeper who was on the field at the start of play. Goalkeepers with no clean sheets not included in the list.

| Rank | No. | Nat. | Goalkeeper | NSL | NSL Cup | Total |
|---|---|---|---|---|---|---|
| 1 | 22 | (Australia) | Natch Vardareff | 5 | 0 | 5 |
| 2 | 1 | (Scotland) | Jim Preston | 1 | 1 | 2 |
| Total | | | | 6 | 1 | 7 |
