= 1986 Wollongong City FC season =

Wollongong City
1986 season
- Manager: John Fleming
- Stadium: Wollongong Showground
- National Soccer League: 8th
- NSL Cup: Second round
- Top goalscorer: League: Robert Giraldi (7); All: Robert Giraldi (8)
- Highest home attendance: 6,130 vs. Sydney Olympic (9 June 1986); National Soccer League
- Lowest home attendance: 1,121 vs. Newcastle Rosebud United (13 August 1986); National Soccer League; 1,121 vs. Canberra City (7 September 1986); National Soccer League
- Average home league attendance: 2,418
- Biggest win: 3–1 (twice); 2–0 (twice)
- Biggest defeat: 1–4 vs. Newcastle Rosebud United (H) (13 August 1986); National Soccer League

The 1986 season was the sixth in the history of Wollongong City (now Wollongong Wolves). It was also the sixth season in the National Soccer League. In addition to the domestic league, they also participated in the NSL Cup. Wollongong City finished 8th to be relegated in their National Soccer League season, and were eliminated in the NSL Cup second round by Sydney Olympic.

== Players ==
Note: Flags indicate national team as defined under FIFA eligibility rules; some limited exceptions apply. Players may hold more than one non-FIFA nationality.

No.	Pos.	Nation	Player
1	GK	AUS	Warwick Young
2	DF	AUS	David Green
3	FW	AUS	Jock Morlando
4	DF	AUS	Scott Dickson
5	DF	AUS	Ray Vliestra (Captain)
6	MF	AUS	Brian Cokely
7	MF	AUS	Robert Giraldi
8	MF	URU	Saúl Rivero
9	MF	AUS	David Batten
10	MF	AUS	Peter Kotamanidis
11	FW	SCO	Willie Murray

No.	Pos.	Nation	Player
12	MF	AUS	Larry Gaffney
13	FW	AUS	Bernie Godzik
14	MF	AUS	Rade Stefanovski
15	FW	AUS	Pat Brodnik
16	DF	AUS	Reg Chilby
17	MF	URU	Leon Arcosa
20	GK	AUS	Sean Billington
—		AUS	John Brown
—	MF	AUS	Randall Easthorpe
—		AUS	Richard Piel

== Competitions ==
=== Overview ===
Competition	First match	Last match	Starting round	Final position	Record							
Competition	First match	Last match	Starting round	Final position	Pld	W	D	L	GF	GA	GD	Win %
National Soccer League	30 March 1986	14 September 1986	Matchday 1	8th	22	9	5	8	26	25	+1	40.91
NSL Cup	23 March 1986	27 April 1986	First round	Second round	2	1	0	1	3	3	+0	50.00
Total					24	10	5	9	29	28	+1	41.67

Last updated: complete
Source: Competitions

=== National Soccer League ===
==== League table ====
Northern Conference

Pos	Team	Pld	W	D	L	GF	GA	GD	Pts	Qualification or relegation
1	Sydney Croatia	22	14	4	4	43	18	+25	32	Qualification for the Finals series
2	Sydney Olympic	22	9	9	4	33	22	+11	27	Qualification for the Finals series
3	St George-Budapest	22	11	5	6	33	29	+4	27	Qualification for the Finals series
4	Marconi Fairfield	22	9	7	6	35	22	+13	25	Qualification for the Finals series
5	Sydney City	22	8	8	6	36	27	+9	24	Qualification for the Finals series and Oceania Cup Winners' Cup (Note: Sydney City qualified for the 1987 Oceania Cup Winners' Cup as the 1986 NSL Cup winners.)
6	Newcastle Rosebud United (R)	22	9	6	7	36	33	+3	24	Relegation to the 1987 NSW State League
7	APIA Leichhardt	22	9	6	7	25	23	+2	24	
8	Wollongong City (R)	22	9	5	8	26	25	+1	23	Relegation to the 1987 NSW State League
9	Blacktown City (R)	22	8	4	10	24	36	−12	20	Relegation to the 1987 NSW State League
10	Canberra City (R)	22	5	6	11	21	27	−6	16	Relegation to the 1987 NSW State League
11	Canterbury Marrickville (R)	22	2	7	13	17	41	−24	11	Relegation to the 1987 NSW State League
12	Inter Monaro (R)	22	3	5	14	17	43	−26	11	Relegation to the 1987 NSW State League

Updated to match(es) played on unknown. Source: rsssf.com
Rules for classification: 1) points; 2) goal difference; 3) number of goals scored.
(R) Relegated
Notes:

Southern Conference

Pos	Team	Pld	W	D	L	GF	GA	GD	Pts	Qualification or relegation
1	Brunswick Juventus	22	11	6	5	37	21	+16	28	Qualification for the Finals series
2	Footscray JUST	22	10	8	4	29	27	+2	28	Qualification for the Finals series
3	Adelaide City (C)	22	10	7	5	32	19	+13	27	Qualification for the Finals series and Oceania Club Championship
4	Sunshine George Cross	22	8	11	3	26	17	+9	27	Qualification for the Finals series
5	Heidelberg United	22	9	8	5	35	25	+10	26	Qualification for the Finals series
6	Preston Makedonia	22	8	9	5	30	20	+10	25	
7	South Melbourne	22	10	5	7	27	20	+7	25	
8	Brisbane Lions (R)	22	7	5	10	27	28	−1	19	Relegation to the 1987 Brisbane Premier League
9	West Adelaide (R)	22	7	4	11	26	34	−8	18	Relegation to the 1987 South Australian Division One
10	Melbourne Croatia	22	6	6	10	25	33	−8	18	
11	Brisbane City (R)	22	3	7	12	18	46	−28	13	Relegation to the 1987 Brisbane Premier League
12	Green Gully (R)	22	2	6	14	16	38	−22	10	Relegation to the 1987 Victorian State League

Updated to match(es) played on unknown. Source: rsssf.com
Rules for classification: 1) points; 2) goal difference; 3) number of goals scored.
(C) Champions; (R) Relegated

==== Results by round ====
Round	1	2	3	4	5	6	7	8	9	10	11	12	13	14	15	16	17	18	19	20	21	22
Ground	H	A	H	A	H	A	H	A	H	A	H	A	H	A	H	A	H	A	H	A	H	A
Result	W	L	W	W	D	W	W	D	L	D	D	L	L	D	W	L	L	L	L	W	W	W
Position	3	6	5	4	4	3	1	1	3	3	3	4	5	5	4	6	8	9	9	9	8	8

Source: worldfootball.net
A = Away; H = Home; W = Win; D = Draw; L = Loss

==== Matches ====
30 March 1986 1	Wollongong City	2–1	Marconi Fairfield	Wollongong
	Rivero 8', 66'	Report	Tredinnick ?'	Stadium: Wollongong Showground; Attendance: 1,200; Referee: Roger Doenau

6 April 1986 2	Blacktown City	1–0	Wollongong City	Sydney
	Thornthwaite 49'	Report		Stadium: Gabbie Stadium; Attendance: 1,342; Referee: Jim Reeves

13 April 1986 3	Wollongong City	3–1	Canterbury Marrickville	Wollongong
	Batten 6', 52', 57'	Report	Borges 14'	Stadium: Wollongong Showground; Attendance: 2,400; Referee: Ken Small

20 April 1986 4	Inter Monaro	1–3	Wollongong City	Queanbeyan
	Carbone 70'	Report	Kotamanidis 55' (pen.); Giraldi 58'; Murray 61'	Stadium: Seiffert Oval; Attendance: 729; Referee: Neil Murray

3 May 1986 5	Wollongong City	0–0	St George-Budapest	Wollongong
		Report		Stadium: Wollongong Showground; Attendance: 2,736; Referee: Terry Seacy

10 May 1986 6	Newcastle Rosebud United	0–1	Wollongong City	Newcastle
		Report	Rivero 19'	Stadium: Adamstown Oval; Attendance: 828; Referee: Graham Warne

18 May 1986 7	Wollongong City	1–0	Sydney Croatia	Wollongong
	Giraldi 65'	Report		Stadium: Wollongong Showground; Attendance: 5,968; Referee: Rob Davies

25 May 1986 8	APIA Leichhardt	1–1	Wollongong City	Sydney
	Baran 76'	Report	Rivero 6'	Stadium: Lambert Park; Attendance: 2,004; Referee: Arthur Owens

9 June 1986 9	Wollongong City	0–1	Sydney Olympic	Wollongong
		Report	Coady 53'	Stadium: Wollongong Showground; Attendance: 6,130; Referee: Graham Warne

15 June 1986 10	Canberra City	0–0	Wollongong City	Canberra
		Report		Stadium: Bruce Stadium; Attendance: 943; Referee: Graham Warne

22 June 1986 11	Wollongong City	1–1	Sydney City	Wollongong
	Kotamanidis 37'	Report	Lee 82'	Stadium: Wollongong City; Attendance: 1,831; Referee: Gary Power

29 June 1986 12	Marconi Fairfield	1–0	Wollongong City	Sydney
	Brown 84'	Report		Stadium: Marconi Stadium; Attendance: 1,672; Referee: Graham Warne

6 July 1986 13	Wollongong City	2–3	Blacktown City	Wollongong
	Giraldi 41'; Easthorpe 54'	Report	Denyer 50' (pen.); Thornthwaite 63'; Carroll 86'	Stadium: Wollongong Showground; Attendance: 1,345; Referee: Tony Pollard

12 July 1986 14	Canterbury Marrickville	1–1	Wollongong City	Sydney
	Zrilic 64' (pen.)	Report	Kotamanidis 82'	Stadium: Arlington Oval; Attendance: 858; Referee: Bob Marshall

20 July 1986 15	Wollongong City	2–0	Inter Monaro	Wollongong
	Giraldi 65', 80'	Report		Stadium: Wollongong Showground; Attendance: 1,200; Referee: Manny Loupis

27 July 1986 16	St George-Budapest	3–1	Wollongong City	Sydney
	O'Shea 29'; Fletcher 40'; Koczka 58'	Report	Giraldi 90'	Stadium: St George Stadium; Attendance: 1,027; Referee: Tony Pollard

13 August 1986 17	Wollongong City	1–4	Newcastle Rosebud United	Wollongong
	Brodnik 82'	Report	Maier 60'; Quarrie 64'; Jones 89', 90'	Stadium: Wollongong Showground; Attendance: 1,121; Referee: Graham Warne

17 August 1986 18	Sydney Croatia	3–1	Wollongong City	Sydney
	Odzakov 25'; Kovacic 45'; Arnold 64'	Report	Brodnik 8'	Stadium: King Tomislav Park; Attendance: 4,623; Referee: Ken Small

24 August 1986 19	Wollongong City	1–2	APIA Leichhardt	Wollongong
	Morlando 12'	Report	Bozanic 78'; Dounis 90'	Stadium: Wollongong Showground; Attendance: 1,542; Referee: Gary Power

31 August 1986 20	Sydney Olympic	1–2	Wollongong City	Sydney
	Soper 78'	Report	Giraldi 5'; Brodnik 90'	Stadium: Pratten Park; Attendance: 3,500; Referee: Gary Power

7 September 1986 21	Wollongong City	1–0	Canberra City	Wollongong
	Brodnik 76'	Report		Stadium: Wollongong Showground; Attendance: 1,121; Referee: Richard Lorenc

14 September 1986 22	Sydney City	0–2	Wollongong City	Sydney
		Report	Brodnik 2'; Morlando 47'	Stadium: ES Marks Athletics Field; Attendance: 754; Referee: Graham Warne

=== NSL Cup ===
23 March 1986 First round	Canterbury Marrickville	2–3	Wollongong City	Sydney
	Hantzis 49' (pen.), 64'	Report	Rivero 24'; Giraldi 57'; Kotamanidis 77'	Stadium: Melita Stadium; Attendance: 520; Referee: Ken Small

27 April 1986 Second round	Sydney Olympic	1–0	Wollongong City	Sydney
	Stevenson 77'	Report		Stadium: St George Stadium; Attendance: 5,569; Referee: Richard Lorenc

== Statistics ==
=== Appearances and goals ===
Players with no appearances not included in the list.

No.	Pos.	Nat.	Name	National Soccer League		NSL Cup		Total	
No.	Pos.	Nat.	Name	Apps	Goals	Apps	Goals	Apps	Goals
1	GK	(Australia)	Warwick Young	21	0	1	0	22	0
2	DF	(Australia)	David Green	21	0	2	0	23	0
3	FW	(Australia)	Jock Morlando	20	2	2	0	22	2
4	DF	(Australia)	Scott Dickson	0	0	0	0	0	0
5	DF	(Australia)	Ray Vliestra	21	0	2	0	23	0
6	MF	(Australia)	Brian Cokely	19	0	2	0	21	0
7	MF	(Australia)	Robert Giraldi	21	7	2	1	23	8
8	MF	(Uruguay)	Saúl Rivero	7	4	1	1	8	5
9	MF	(Australia)	David Batten	7(6)	3	1(1)	0	15	3
10	MF	(Australia)	Peter Kotamanidis	19(2)	3	2	1	23	4
11	FW	(Scotland)	Willie Murray	14	1	2	0	16	1
12	MF	(Australia)	Larry Gaffney	14(2)	0	2	0	18	0
14	MF	(Australia)	Rade Stefanovski	9(3)	0	0	0	12	0
15	FW	(Australia)	Pat Brodnik	9(6)	5	1	0	16	5
16	DF	(Australia)	Reg Chilby	21	0	2	0	23	0
17	MF	(Uruguay)	Leon Arcosa	7(1)	0	0(1)	0	9	0
20	GK	(Australia)	Sean Billington	1	0	1	0	2	0
—		(Australia)	John Brown	0(1)	0	0	0	1	0
—	MF	(Australia)	Randall Easthorpe	6(3)	1	0	0	9	1
—		(Australia)	Richard Piel	2	0	0	0	2	0
Players transferred out but featured this season
13	FW	(Australia)	Bernie Godzik	1	0	0	0	1	0

=== Clean sheets ===
Rank	No.	Pos	Nat	Name	National Soccer League	NSL Cup	Total
1	—	GK	(Australia)	Warwick Young	7	0	7
Total					7	0	7
