= Clive Campbell =

Clive Campbell may refer to:

- Clive Campbell (cricketer) (born 1951), Jamaican cricketer
- Clive Campbell (footballer), New Zealand footballer
- DJ Kool Herc (Clive Campbell, born 1955), Jamaican American DJ
