= 1989 Wollongong City FC season =

Wollongong City
1989 season
- Manager: John Fleming; Doug Collins
- Stadium: Brandon Park
- National Soccer League: 9th
- NSL Cup: Second round
- Highest home attendance: 4,756 vs. Sydney Croatia (5 February 1989); National Soccer League
- Lowest home attendance: 465 vs. APIA Leichhardt (15 April 1989); NSL Cup
- Biggest win: 4–1 vs. Blacktown City (26 January 1989); and 3–0 vs. Heidelberg United (9 April 1989)
- Biggest defeat: 0–6 vs. Marconi (11 March 1989); National Soccer League

The 1989 season was the ninth in the history of Wollongong City. It was also the club's ninth season in the National Soccer League. In addition to the domestic league, the club also participated in the NSL Cup. Wollongong City finished 9th in their National Soccer League season, and were eliminated in the NSL Cup second round by APIA Leichhardt.

== Players ==
Note: Flags indicate national team as defined under FIFA eligibility rules; some limited exceptions apply. Players may hold more than one non-FIFA nationality.

| No. | Pos. | Nation | Player |
|---|---|---|---|
| — | GK | AUS | Warwick Young |
| — | DF | AUS | David Skeen |
| — | DF | ENG | Mike Hollifield |
| — | DF | AUS | Peter Kotamanidis |
| — | DF | AUS | Ray Vliestra |
| — | DF | AUS | Jock Morlando |
| — | MF | AUS | Rade Stefanovski |
| — | DF | AUS | Mineo Bonetig |
| — | FW | AUS | Randell Easthorpe |
| — | FW | AUS | Pat Brodnik |
| — | FW | SCO | Danny Crainie |
| — | MF | AUS | John Brown |

| No. | Pos. | Nation | Player |
|---|---|---|---|
| — | MF | AUS | Robert Giraldi |
| — | MF | AUS | Jason Higgs |
| — | MF | AUS | Brian Cokely |
| — | | AUS | Goran Trajceski |
| — | DF | AUS | Jeff Allport |
| — | FW | AUS | John Danzo |
| — | FW | AUS | David Batten |
| — | FW | AUS | Walter Calbanese |
| — | MF | AUS | Tom Pontidas |
| — | MF | AUS | Sean Ingham |
| — | MF | AUS | Hernan Fernandez |
| — | MF | AUS | Ernesto Lorca |

Source: National Soccer League Yearbook 1989, Australian Soccer Annual

== Competitions ==
=== Overall record ===
| Competition | First match | Last match | Starting round | Final position | Record | | | | | | | |
| Competition | First match | Last match | Starting round | Final position | Pld | W | D | L | GF | GA | GD | Win % |
|---|---|---|---|---|---|---|---|---|---|---|---|---|
| National Soccer League | 22 January 1989 | 16 July 1989 | Matchday 1 | 9th | 26 | 8 | 7 | 11 | 22 | 29 | −7 | 30.77 |
| NSL Cup | 15 April 1989 | | Second round | Second round | 1 | 0 | 0 | 1 | 1 | 2 | −1 | 0.00 |
| Total | | | | | 27 | 8 | 7 | 12 | 23 | 31 | −8 | 29.63 |

Last updated: complete
Source: Competitions

=== National Soccer League ===
==== League table ====
| Pos | Team | Pld | W | D | L | GF | GA | GD | Pts |
|---|---|---|---|---|---|---|---|---|---|
| 7 | Sydney Croatia | 26 | 10 | 8 | 8 | 25 | 25 | 0 | 28 |
| 8 | South Melbourne | 26 | 9 | 8 | 9 | 44 | 37 | +7 | 26 |
| 9 | Wollongong City | 26 | 8 | 7 | 11 | 22 | 29 | −7 | 23 |
| 10 | APIA Leichhardt | 26 | 7 | 9 | 10 | 27 | 35 | −8 | 23 |
| 11 | Sunshine George Cross | 26 | 7 | 5 | 14 | 25 | 38 | −13 | 19 |

Updated to match(es) played on unknown. Source: rsssf.com
Rules for classification: 1) points; 2) goal difference; 3) number of goals scored.

==== Results summary ====
| Overall | | | | | | | | Home | | | | | | Away | | | | | |
| Pld | W | D | L | GF | GA | GD | Pts | W | D | L | GF | GA | GD | W | D | L | GF | GA | GD |
|---|---|---|---|---|---|---|---|---|---|---|---|---|---|---|---|---|---|---|---|
| 26 | 8 | 7 | 11 | 22 | 29 | −7 | 23 | 5 | 4 | 4 | 15 | 16 | −1 | 3 | 3 | 7 | 7 | 13 | −6 |

Source: worldfootball.net

==== Results by round ====
| Round | 1 | 2 | 3 | 4 | 5 | 6 | 7 | 8 | 9 | 10 | 11 | 12 | 13 | 14^{1} | 15^{2} | 16 | 17 | 18 | 19 | 20 | 21 | 22 | 23 | 24 | 25 | 26 |
|---|---|---|---|---|---|---|---|---|---|---|---|---|---|---|---|---|---|---|---|---|---|---|---|---|---|---|
| Ground | A | H | A | H | A | H | A | H | H | A | H | A | H | H | A | H | A | H | A | A | A | H | A | H | A | H |
| Result | D | W | L | W | L | D | W | L | L | L | W | L | W | D | W | L | L | D | L | L | D | D | D | L | W | W |
| Position | =7 | 2 | =7 | 5 | 8 | 8 | 6 | 5 | 9 | 10 | 10 | 10 | 8 | 7 | 7 | 9 | 10 | 10 | 10 | 10 | 10 | 10 | 10 | 10 | 10 | 9 |
| Points | 1 | 3 | 3 | 5 | 5 | 6 | 8 | 8 | 8 | 8 | 10 | 10 | 12 | 13 | 15 | 15 | 15 | 16 | 16 | 16 | 17 | 18 | 19 | 19 | 21 | 23 |

Source: worldfootball.net
A = Away; H = Home; W = Win; D = Draw; L = Loss
Notes:
^{1} Matchday 14 (vs. APIA Leichhardt) was moved to the end of the season due to the World Cup Qualifiers

^{2} Matchday 15 (vs. Blacktown City) was played after Round 21, however Wollongong points and position are retroactively adjusted for the end of the round.

==== Matches ====
| 22 January 1989 1 | APIA Leichhardt | 0–0 | Wollongong City | Leichhardt, Sydney |
| | | Report | | Stadium: Lambert Park; Attendance: 1,630; Referee: David Willcocks |

| 26 January 1989 2 | Wollongong City | 4–1 | Blacktown City | Fairy Meadow, Wollongong |
| | Crainie 4'; Easthorpe 46'; Denyer 48' (o.g.); Brodnik 50' | Report | Denyer 60' | Stadium: Brandon Park; Attendance: 1,591; Referee: Bob Marshall |

| 29 January 1989 3 | St George | 2–0 | Wollongong City | Rockdale, Sydney |
| | Ollerenshaw 10', 76' | Report | | Stadium: St George Stadium; Attendance: 1,659; Referee: Alan Townsend |

| 5 February 1989 4 | Wollongong City | 1–0 | Sydney Croatia | Fairy Meadow, Wollongong |
| | Easthorpe 13' | Report | | Stadium: Brandon Park; Attendance: 4,756; Referee: Peter Spiers |

| 12 February 1989 5 | Preston Makedonia | 1–0 | Wollongong City | Olympic Park, Melbourne |
| | Markovac 52' | Report | | Stadium: Olympic Park Stadium; Attendance: 2,761; Referee: Dean Voutsinas |

| 19 February 1989 6 | Wollongong City | 0–0 | Sunshine George Cross | Fairy Meadow, Wollongong |
| | | Report | | Stadium: Brandon Park; Attendance: 1,412; Referee: Arthur Owens |

| 26 February 1989 7 | South Melbourne | 0–2 | Wollongong City | Middle Park, Melbourne |
| | | Report | Easthorpe 5'; Skeen 24' | Stadium: Middle Park (stadium); Attendance: 3,500; Referee: John Santa Isabel |

| 5 March 1989 8 | Wollongong City | 0–1 | Adelaide City | Fairy Meadow, Wollongong |
| | | Report | Maxwell 60' | Stadium: Brandon Park; Attendance: 1,246; Referee: Arthur Owens |

| 11 March 1989 9 | Wollongong City | 0–6 | Marconi | Fairy Meadow, Wollongong |
| | | Report | Lowe 39'; de Jong 45', 70', 73'; Nastevski 59'; Gray 84' | Stadium: Brandon Park; Attendance: 1,648; Referee: Chris Bambridge |

| 17 March 1989 10 | Sydney Olympic | 3–1 | Wollongong City | Rockdale, Sydney |
| | Spyridakos 54'; Ironside 63', 89' | Report | Morlando 13' | Stadium: St George Stadium; Attendance: 3,500; Referee: John Santa Isabel |

| 27 March 1989 11 | Wollongong City | 2–0 | Melbourne Croatia | Fairy Meadow, Wollongong |
| | Crainie 49'; Danzo 65' | Report | | Stadium: Brandon Park; Attendance: 2,500; Referee: Alan Townsend |

| 1 April 1989 12 | Melbourne City JUST | 2–0 | Wollongong City | Footscray, Melbourne |
| | Murphy 19'; Retre 74' | Report | | Stadium: Schintler Reserve; Attendance: 1,190; Referee: Jim Fearn |

| 9 April 1989 13 | Wollongong City | 3–0 | Heidelberg United | Fairy Meadow, Wollongong |
| | Easthorpe 32'; Cokely 37'; Brodnik 63' | Report | | Stadium: Brandon Park; Attendance: 889; Referee: Bob Jones |

| 30 April 1989 16 | Wollongong City | 2–3 | Preston Makedonia | Fairy Meadow, Wollongong |
| | Brodnik 17'; Skeen 89' | Report | Markovski 8'; Smith 20', 30' | Stadium: Brandon Park; Attendance: 2,104; Referee: Arthur Owens |

| 7 May 1989 17 | Sydney Croatia | 1–0 | Wollongong City | Edensor Park, Sydney |
| | Slater 52' (pen.) | Report | | Stadium: Sydney Croatian Sports Centre; Attendance: 3,431; Referee: Jim Fearn |

| 14 May 1989 18 | Wollongong City | 0–0 | St George | Fairy Meadow, Wollongong |
| | | Report | | Stadium: Brandon Park; Attendance: 1,223; Referee: Alan Townsend |

| 21 May 1989 19 | Sunshine George Cross | 1–0 | Wollongong City | Sunshine, Melbourne |
| | Lewis 69' | Report | | Stadium: Chaplin Reserve; Attendance: 1,700; Referee: John Fraser |

| 28 May 1989 20 | Wollongong City | 1–4 | South Melbourne | Fairy Meadow, Wollongong |
| | Brodnik 58' | Report | Trimboli 3'; Tasios 44'; Postecoglou 47' (pen.), 73' (pen.) | Stadium: Brandon Park; Attendance: 1,205; Referee: David Willcocks |

| 4 June 1989 21 | Adelaide City | 1–1 | Wollongong City | Kensington, South Australia, Adelaide |
| | Mullen 5' | Report | Easthorpe 81' | Stadium: Olympic Sports Field; Attendance: 1,500; Referee: Dennis Voutsinas |

| 11 June 1989 22 | Marconi | 0–0 | Wollongong City | Bossley Park, Sydney |
| | | Report | | Stadium: Marconi Stadium; Attendance: 2,653; Referee: Bill Monteverde |

| 14 June 1989 15 | Blacktown City | 0–1 | Wollongong City | Edensor Park, Sydney |
| | | Report | Ingham 34' | Stadium: Sydney Croatian Sports Centre; Attendance: 406; Referee: Richard Lorenc |

| 18 June 1989 23 | Wollongong City | 0–0 | Sydney Olympic | Fairy Meadow, Wollongong |
| | | Report | | Stadium: Brandon Park; Attendance: 2,252; Referee: John McConnell |

| 25 June 1989 24 | Melbourne Croatia | 2–1 | Wollongong City | Sunshine North, Melbourne |
| | Awaritefe 50'; Adzic 71' | Report | Jurcic 66' (o.g.) | Stadium: Somers Street Stadium; Attendance: 4,084; Referee: Barry Harwood |

| 2 July 1989 25 | Wollongong City | 1–0 | Melbourne City JUST | Fairy Meadow, Wollongong |
| | Kotamanidis 75' | Report | | Stadium: Brandon Park; Attendance: 1,107; Referee: Peter Spiers |

| 9 July 1989 26 | Heidelberg United | 0–1 | Wollongong City | Heidelberg West, Melbourne |
| | | Report | Stefanovski 64' | Stadium: Olympic Village; Attendance: 2,771; Referee: Don Campbell |

| 16 July 1989 14 | Wollongong City | 1–1 | APIA Leichhardt | Fairy Meadow, Wollongong |
| | Easthorpe 3' | Report | Kosmina 56' | Stadium: Brandon Park; Attendance: 903; Referee: Gary Power |

=== NSL Cup ===
| 15 April 1989 Second Round | Wollongong City | 1–2 | APIA Leichhardt | Fairy Meadow, Wollongong |
| | Ellem 27' (o.g.) | Report | Blagojevic 40'; Hagan ?' | Stadium: Brandon Park; Attendance: 465; Referee: John McConnell |

== Statistics ==
=== Appearances and goals ===
Players with no appearances not included in the list.

| No. | Pos | Nat | Player | Total | | National Soccer League | | NSL Finals series | | NSL Cup | |
| No. | Pos | Nat | Player | Apps | Goals | Apps | Goals | Apps | Goals | Apps | Goals |
|---|---|---|---|---|---|---|---|---|---|---|---|
| | DF | (England) ENG | Mike Hollifield | 27 | 0 | 26 | 0 | 0 | 0 | 1 | 0 |
| | DF | (Australia) AUS | Ray Vliestra | 26 | 0 | 26 | 0 | 0 | 0 | 0 | 0 |
| | FW | (Scotland) SCO | Danny Crainie | 26 | 2 | 25 | 2 | 0 | 0 | 1 | 0 |
| | DF | (Australia) AUS | David Skeen | 25 | 2 | 24 | 2 | 0 | 0 | 1 | 0 |
| | FW | (Australia) AUS | Randell Easthorpe | 24 | 6 | 23 | 6 | 0 | 0 | 1 | 0 |
| | DF | (Australia) AUS | Jock Morlando | 24 | 2 | 23 | 2 | 0 | 0 | 1 | 0 |
| | FW | (Australia) AUS | Pat Brodnik | 22 | 4 | 22 | 4 | 0 | 0 | 0 | 0 |
| | DF | (Australia) AUS | Peter Kotamanidis | 21 | 1 | 20 | 1 | 0 | 0 | 1 | 0 |
| | MF | (Australia) AUS | Rade Stefanovski | 20 | 0 | 20 | 0 | 0 | 0 | 0 | 0 |
| | GK | (Australia) AUS | Warwick Young | 17 | 0 | 16 | 0 | 0 | 0 | 1 | 0 |
| | MF | (Australia) AUS | Robert Giraldi | 16 | 0 | 15 | 0 | 0 | 0 | 1 | 0 |
| | MF | (Australia) AUS | Mineo Bonetig | 11 | 0 | 11 | 0 | 0 | 0 | 0 | 0 |
| | FW | (Australia) AUS | Walter Calbanese | 11 | 0 | 11 | 0 | 0 | 0 | 0 | 0 |
| | GK | (Australia) AUS | George Bouhoutsos | 10 | 0 | 10 | 0 | 0 | 0 | 0 | 0 |
| | MF | (Australia) AUS | Jason Higgs | 10 | 0 | 9 | 0 | 0 | 0 | 1 | 0 |
| | MF | (Australia) AUS | Brian Cokely | 8 | 1 | 8 | 1 | 0 | 0 | 0 | 0 |
| | FW | (Australia) AUS | John Danzo | 7 | 1 | 6 | 1 | 0 | 0 | 1 | 0 |
| | MF | (Australia) AUS | Tom Pontidas | 6 | 0 | 6 | 0 | 0 | 0 | 0 | 0 |
| | MF | (Australia) AUS | Sean Ingham | 6 | 1 | 6 | 1 | 0 | 0 | 0 | 0 |
| | FW | (Australia) AUS | David Batten | 5 | 0 | 4 | 0 | 0 | 0 | 1 | 0 |
| | | (Australia) AUS | Goran Trajceski | 3 | 0 | 3 | 0 | 0 | 0 | 0 | 0 |
| | MF | (Australia) AUS | Hernan Fernandez | 3 | 0 | 3 | 0 | 0 | 0 | 0 | 0 |
| | MF | (Australia) AUS | Ernesto Lorca | 2 | 0 | 2 | 0 | 0 | 0 | 0 | 0 |
| | MF | (Australia) AUS | John Brown | 2 | 0 | 1 | 0 | 0 | 0 | 1 | 0 |
| | DF | (Australia) AUS | Jeff Allport | 1 | 0 | 1 | 0 | 0 | 0 | 0 | 0 |

=== Clean sheets ===
| Player | National Soccer League | NSL Finals | NSL Cup | Total |
|---|---|---|---|---|
| (Australia) Warwick Young | 7 | 0 | 0 | 7 |
| (Australia) George Bouhoutsos | 4 | 0 | 0 | 4 |
| Total | 11 | 0 | 0 | 11 |

== See also ==
- List of Wollongong Wolves FC seasons
