= 2019 National Premier Leagues Grand Final =

- Event: 2019 National Premier Leagues
Wollongong Wolves	Lions FC
4	3
- Date: 5 October 2019
- Venue: Albert Butler Park, Wollongong
- Referee: Stephen Laurie
- Attendance: 1,362

The 2019 National Premier Leagues Grand Final was the seventh National Premier Leagues Grand Final, the championship deciding match of the National Premier Leagues in Australia. It was played on 5 October 2019 at Albert Butler Park in Wollongong between Wollongong Wolves and Lions FC. Wollongong won the match 4–3 to secure their first championship in the National Premier Leagues.

== Route to the final ==
Quarter-finals
(New South Wales) Wollongong Wolves	5
(Australian Capital Territory) Canberra Olympic	1
(Victoria (state)) Heidelberg United	2
(Western Australia) Perth SC (a.e.t.)	3
(New South Wales) Maitland FC	3
(Tasmania) Devonport City	2
(Queensland) Lions FC	2
(South Australia) Campbelltown City	1

Semi-finals
(New South Wales) Wollongong Wolves	2
(Western Australia) Perth SC	0
(New South Wales) Maitland FC	0
(Queensland) Lions FC	2

Grand Final
(New South Wales) Wollongong Wolves	4
(Queensland) Lions FC	3

== Match ==
=== Details ===
19 May 2019
14:30 AEST

Wollongong Wolves	4–3 (a.e.t.)	Lions FC
James 52' (pen.), 116'; Okada 80'; Jauch 109'	Report	Carlos 13'; Mádle 84'; Duckworth 119' (pen.)

Albert Butler Park, Wollongong
Attendance: 1,362
Referee: Stephen Laurie

GK	1	(Australia) Justin Pasfield	(yellow card) 54'
RB	2	(Australia) Taylor McDonald
CB	15	(Australia) Nicholas Littler
CB	4	(Australia) Nikola Djorjevic	(yellow card) 118'
LB	3	(Australia) Darcy Madden
DM	16	(Australia) Guy Knight	(yellow card) 91', (substituted off) 94'
DM	17	(North Macedonia) James Stojcevski	(yellow card) 40'
AM	14	(Australia) Harry Callahan	(yellow card) 112', (substituted off) 120'
AM	9	(Australia) Thomas James
AM	11	(Japan) Takeru Okada	(substituted off) 108'
CF	24	(Australia) Lachlan Scott	(substituted off) 96'
Substitutes:
GK	12	(Australia) Luke Kairies
MF	10	(Australia) Brendan Griffin	(substituted on) 94'
FW	8	(Australia) Bul Juach	(substituted on) 96'
FW	13	(Australia) Stefan Dimoski	(substituted on) 120'
FW	23	(Australia) Jordan Nikolovski	(substituted on) 108'
Manager: (Australia) Luke Wilkshire

GK	90	(Australia) Luke Borean
RB	2	(Australia) Andrew Thompson	(substituted off) 73'
CB	5	(Australia) Tommy Jarrad
CB	4	(Croatia) Matija Simic
LB	16	(Australia) Joshua Brindell-South	(yellow card) 103', (substituted off) 105'
CM	8	(Australia) Mitchell Hore	(yellow card) 54' (yellow-red card) 90+2'
CM	15	(Australia) Danny Kim	(yellow card) 32'
CM	12	(Australia) Shaun Carlos	(substituted off) 73'
RW	13	(Australia) Henry Hore
CF	10	(Australia) Joe Duckworth
LW	11	(Scotland) Nathan Shepherd	(substituted off) 62'
Substitutes:
GK	20	(Australia) Jackson Riley
DF	6	(Australia) Nathan Reardon	(substituted on) 73'
MF	3	(Australia) Leum Walpole	(substituted on) 105'
MF	9	(Australia) Keegan Jelacic	(substituted on) 62'
FW	17	(Czech Republic) Marek Mádle	(substituted on) 73'
Manager: (England) Warren Moon

Assistant referees:
(Australia) Brad Wright
(Australia) Emma Kocbek
Fourth official:
(Australia) Tim Danaskos

Match rules

- 90 minutes.
- 30 minutes of extra time if necessary.
- Penalty shoot-out if scores still level.
- Five named substitutes.
- Maximum of three substitutions (four included in the case of extra time).

=== Statistics ===
	Wollongong Wolves	Lions FC
Goals scored	4	3
Total shots	29	12
Shots on target	15	4
Ball possession	56.8%	43.2%
Corner kicks	7	5
Fouls Conceded	21	17
Offsides	4	3
Yellow cards	5	2
Red cards	0	1

== Broadcasting ==
The Grand Final was broadcast live throughout Australia on Facebook Live and YouTube.

== See also ==
- 2019 National Premier Leagues
