= Ian Hunter (soccer) =

Australian soccer player

Personal information
- Date of birth: 10 August 1961 (age 65)
- Place of birth: Campsie
- Position: Striker

Youth career
- Penrith RSL
- Penrith United

Senior career*
Years	Team	Apps	(Gls)
1980	Blacktown City	22	(6)
1981–1983	Marconi	53	(6)
1984–1985	Penrith City	46	(4)
1991	Blacktown City		

International career
1980	Australia	4	(5)
1978–1981	Australia U-20		

Managerial career
- 2003–2004: Springwood
- * Club domestic league appearances and goals

Ian Hunter (born 10 August 1961) is an Australian former soccer player who played in the National Soccer League (NSL) for Blacktown City, Marconi and Penrith City. He represented Australia at youth and senior international level, captaining the under-20 national team and playing one full international match for the senior national team.

== Club career ==
Hunter played youth football for Penrith RSL and Penrith United before joining Blacktown City ahead of their entry into the NSL in 1980.

Hunter made his National Soccer League debut for Blacktown City in 1980. In 1981, he transferred to Marconi before a stint at Penrith City. Hunter stayed with Penrith City as they returned to the NSW State League in 1986. He again represented the team in 1987. which by then was known as Uruguayan Penrith. He returned to Blacktown City in 1991.

== International career ==
In 1978, he toured with the Australian Schoolboy team that played in the United States and Canada.

Hunter played for the Australian under-20 team in 1978 in 1979 FIFA World Youth Championship qualifying matches against Papua New Guinea and New Zealand as well as in a friendly match against Vardar Skopje.

In 1979 Hunter toured with an Australian under-20 team that played matches against a number of club and national youth teams. He played in wins against Hertha Zehlendorf in Wollongong, Flamengo in Rio de Janeiro and a draw against Israel in Paraguay.

Hunter made his full international debut for Australia at the 1980 OFC Nations Cup against Papua New Guinea at the age of 18 years and 200 days. Hunter came on as a substitute at half time in the match before scoring three goals in an 11–2 win for Australia. In four matches at the tournament, including three B international matches, Hunter scored five goals tying with Eddie Krncevic as leading goalscorer.

In 1981, he played four matches as captain of the Australia under-20 team that made the quarter-finals of the 1981 FIFA World Youth Championship held in Australia. He scored a goal in Australia's opening match of the tournament against Argentina, a match Australia won 2–1.

== Coaching career ==
Hunter coached Springwood in the New South Wales Second Division in 2008.

== Career statistics ==
=== International ===
Appearances and goals by national team and year
National team	Year	Apps	Goals
Australia	1980	4	5
Total		4	5

Scores and results list Australia's goal tally first, score column indicates score after each Hunter goal.

List of international goals scored by Ian Hunter
No.	Date	Venue	Opponent	Score	Result	Competition
1	24 February 1980	Stade Numa-Daly Magenta, Nouméa, New Caledonia	New Caledonia	?–0	8–0	1980 Oceania Cup
2	24 February 1980	Stade Numa-Daly Magenta, Nouméa, New Caledonia	New Caledonia	?–0	8–0	1980 Oceania Cup
3	26 February 1980	Stade Numa-Daly Magenta, Nouméa, New Caledonia	Papua New Guinea	?–?	8–2	1980 Oceania Cup
4	26 February 1980	Stade Numa-Daly Magenta, Nouméa, New Caledonia	Papua New Guinea	?–?	8–2	1980 Oceania Cup
5	26 February 1980	Stade Numa-Daly Magenta, Nouméa, New Caledonia	Papua New Guinea	?–?	8–2	1980 Oceania Cup
