= Cook Park, St Marys =

Multi-use venue in New South Wales, Australia

Cook Park
- Interactive map of Cook Park
- Location: Wilson Street, St Marys, New South Wales
- Coordinates: 33.77644°S 150.76820°E
- Capacity: 1,000
- Surface: Grass

Tenant
- Nepean FC

Cook Park is a multi-use venue in the suburb of St Marys in Sydney, Australia. It is mainly used for Association football and is the home ground for Nepean FC. The ground is also used by Western Sydney Wanderers FC's women's and youth teams. The stadium has a capacity of 1,000 people.

On 25 July 2012, the venue was host to Western Sydney Wanderers during the club's first match of any kind - a friendly against Nepean FC.
