= Alan Waldron (footballer) =

English footballer

Personal information
- Full name: Alan Waldron
- Date of birth: 6 September 1951 (age 75)
- Place of birth: Royton, Lancashire, England
- Height: 5 ft 7 1/2 in (1.71 m)
- Position: Midfielder

Youth career
- –1969: Bolton Wanderers

Senior career*
Years	Team	Apps	(Gls)
1969–1977	Bolton Wanderers	141	(6)
1977–1979	Blackpool	23	(1)
1979–1981	Bury	34	(0)
1981	York City	3	(1)
1982–1983	Wollongong City	14	(1)
Total		215	(9)
- * Club domestic league appearances and goals

Alan Waldron (born 6 September 1951) is an English former professional footballer who played as a midfielder in the Football League for Bolton Wanderers, Blackpool, Bury and York City, and in Australia for Wollongong City.
