= David J. Batten =

British palynologist (1943–2019)

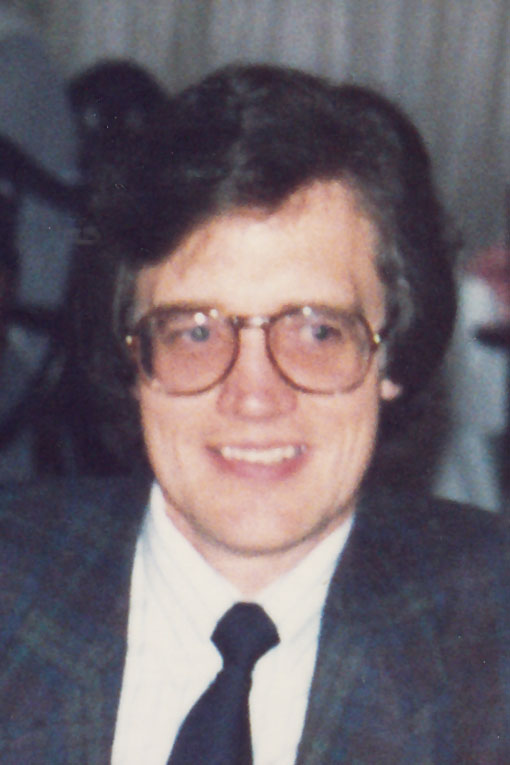
- David J. Batten, photographed in 1988
- Born: 26 April 1943; Watford, Hertfordshire, England
- Died: 14 February 2019 (aged 75); Bartestree, Herefordshire, England
- Education: Queen's University, Kingston, Ontario, Canada; University College London; University of Cambridge
- Scientific career
- Fields: Palynology
- Workplaces: Robertson Research International Ltd; BP; University of Aberdeen; Aberystwyth University; University of Manchester
- Doctoral advisor: Norman Hughes

David J. Batten (1943–2019) was a British palynologist. He is best known for his work in Mesozoic terrestrial palynology and palynofacies analysis. His specific contributions include work on the Normapolles group of pollen in the Late Cretaceous and Early Tertiary, Mesozoic and Tertiary megaspores from around the world, palynofacies analysis to interpret past environments, and the palynology of the Wealden Group (Early Cretaceous, Valanginian–Barremian) of southern England.

== Early life ==
He was born on 26 April 1943 in Watford and grew up in Croydon, South London. When he was a teenager he and his family moved to Canada, where he attended a boarding school near Toronto.

== Academic career ==
He graduated from Queen's University, Kingston, Ontario with a BA in Liberal Arts in 1964 and a BSc in geology and biology in 1965. He then returned to England to study for a MSc in micropalaeontology at University College London, which was awarded in 1966. He then moved to the University of Cambridge where he studied the palynology of the Wealden Group and was awarded a PhD for his thesis Facies distribution of British Wealden palynomorphs in 1966. After a two-year postdoc at Cambridge he worked in the oil industry for Robertson Research International Ltd in North Wales and BP International, Sunbury on Thames and Aberdeen.

In 1976 he was hired as a lecturer in the geology department of the University of Aberdeen, where he was promoted to reader in 1988. In 1990 he moved to the Institute of Earth Studies at Aberystwyth University to set up a MSc and PhD programme in palynology. He was promoted to a professor in 1992 and became a professor emeritus in 2002. He subsequently became affiliated with the University of Manchester as an honorary research professor and a visiting professor until his death. He was also a distinguished visiting professor at the Chinese Academy of Sciences in Nanjing in 2011–2012.

During his career Batten was an author of 193 refereed journal articles, book chapters and books and supervised eight MSc and 14 PhD students. He was also editor-in-chief of the journal Cretaceous Research (1988-2007 & 2011–2012) as well as editor-in-chief for the publications of the Palaeontological Association (1999–2008). His awards include the T.M. Harris Medal of the Birbal Sahni Institute of Palaeobotany, India (1998), the Jongmans Medal of the Royal Geological and Mining Society of the Netherlands (2006), an honorary life membership of The Palaeontological Association, London (2011) and the Medal for Scientific Excellence of AASP–The Palynological Society (2018).
