= Penrith City SC =

Australian soccer club

Penrith City SC was an Australian soccer club based in Penrith, New South Wales. The club, founded in 1984, was an offshoot of the Penrith Panthers rugby league club, participating in the National Soccer League (NSL) 1984 and 1985 seasons, in the league's Northern Division.

== National Soccer League ==
The club's first season was moderately successful, with the team finishing in 7th place despite the squad being largely made up of unfancied players (including former professional Roy Cotton), as well as reaching the quarter finals of the NSL Cup. The club's second season in the NSL was less successful. It was knocked out in the first round of the Cup, and finished the 1985 league season in 2nd last place, resulting in relegation to the New South Wales State League, where they played one further season until being taken over by a Uruguayan consortium and being renamed Penrith Uruguayan. This last incarnation lasted until 1989, when the team became defunct.

== League history ==
Season	League	Position	Pld	W	D	L	GF–GA	Pts	Finals	NSL Cup
1984	National Soccer League	7th of 12*	28	8	10	10	29–41	26	DNQ	Quarter Finals
1985	National Soccer League	11th of 12*	22	4	6	12	24–35	14	DNQ	Round 1
1986	New South Wales State League Division One	11th of 12	22	6	2	14	31–64	14	Not held	n/a

Key

- * = North Conference.
- = Relegated.
