= Chris Dunleavy =

English footballer (born 1949)

Personal information
- Date of birth: 30 December 1949 (age 76)
- Place of birth: Liverpool, England
- Height: 5 ft 10 in (1.78 m)
- Position: Defender

Senior career*
Years	Team	Apps	(Gls)
1968–1969	Everton	0	(0)
1969–1973	Southport	147	(9)
1973–1974	Philadelphia Atoms	37	(0)
1973–1976	Chester	76	(0)
1976–1981	Halifax Town	181	(13)
1981–1983	Wollongong City	78	(6)
- * Club domestic league appearances and goals

Chris Dunleavy (born 30 December 1949) is an English former professional footballer who played for Everton, Southport, Philadelphia Atoms, Chester, Halifax Town and Wollongong FC.

Dunleavy was voted Chester's player of the year for 1973–74 but suffered a broken leg during their 3–0 win against Torquay United the following season. This meant he missed the remainder of the club's first promotion season, but he remained at Chester until moving to Halifax Town in October 1976 along with Tony Loska.

Dunleavy joined Wollongong City in the Australian National Soccer League in 1981 where he played three seasons with the south coast club.

== Bibliography ==
- Sumner, Chas (1997). On the Borderline: The Official History of Chester City F.C. 1885-1997. Yore Publications. ISBN 978-1-874427-52-0.
- Jose, Colin (2003). North American Soccer League Encyclopedia. Haworth, NJ: St. Johann Press. ISBN 978-1-878282-26-2.
