= Clive Campbell (footballer) =

New Zealand footballer

Personal information
- Full name: Clive W Campbell
- Place of birth: New Zealand
- Height: 5 ft 8 in (1.73 m)
- Position: Midfielder

Senior career*
Years	Team	Apps	(Gls)
1970–?	Blockhouse Bay		
?–1980	Mount Wellington		
1981–1982	Wollongong City	27	(5)
1983	Sydney United		

International career
1977–1981	New Zealand	17	(5)
- * Club domestic league appearances and goals

Clive Campbell is a retired association football player who represented New Zealand.

== Career ==
Campbell began his career with Blockhouse Bay before joining Mt Wellington in the mid-1970s and became the first player to reach 200 appearances in the New Zealand National League before finishing his playing days in Australia with Wollongong Wolves and Sydney United.

He made 17 A-International appearances for New Zealand between 1977 and 1981, scoring 5 times including 2 on his début against New Caledonia. He was part of the squad that qualified for the 1982 FIFA World Cup in Spain but was not included in the 23 man squad at the finals.

In 1997 Campbell took charge of the New Zealand U-15 team for the US Soccer Identification Camp in Portland, Oregon Campbell is currently assistant coach to Colin Tuaa for Auckland City FC and assistant coach of the New Zealand U-17.

Clive's son Jeff Campbell also represented the All Whites.
