= Roy Cotton =

English footballer

Personal information
- Full name: Roy William Cotton
- Date of birth: 14 November 1955 (age 70)
- Place of birth: Fulham, England
- Height: 6 ft 0 in (1.83 m)
- Position: Winger

Youth career
- Tottenham Hotspur

Senior career*
Years	Team	Apps	(Gls)
1973–1974	Brentford	2	(0)
1974–1976	Orient	3	(0)
1976–1978	Aldershot	5	(0)
1978–1979	Hillingdon Borough		
1979–1981	St George Budapest	40	(11)
1981	→ Sydney Olympic (loan)	13	(3)
1982–1983	Wollongong City	57	(22)
1984	Penrith City	25	(7)
1985–1986	St George	31	(4)
1988	Wollongong City	3	(0)

International career
1974	England Youth	3	(2)
- * Club domestic league appearances and goals

Roy William Cotton (born 14 November 1955) is an English retired professional footballer who played as a winger in the Football League for Brentford, Orient and Aldershot and later in the Australian National Soccer League.

== Playing career ==
A graduate of the Brentford youth team, Cotton began his career as an amateur and after signing his first professional contract, he made his professional debut in December 1973. He departed the club in July 1974, after making just two appearances. Cotton moved to Second Division club Orient and scored prolifically for the reserve team, but made just four appearances during the 1975–76 season. He dropped back down to the Fourth Division to join Aldershot in July 1976 and made five appearances for the club. After his departure in 1978, Cotton joined Southern League Premier Division club Hillingdon Borough. Cotton moved to Australia in 1979 and played for National Soccer League clubs St George Budapest (two spells), Sydney Olympic, Wollongong City (two spells) and Penrith City.

== International career ==
Cotton won three caps and scored two goals for the England Youth team. He also made an appearance for the FA Youth XI.

== Personal life ==
Cotton lives in Australia and has held senior corporate positions with Mercedes-Benz, Audi Australia and in real estate.

== Career statistics ==
Appearances and goals by club, season and competition
Club	Season	League			National Cup		League Cup		Total	
Club	Season	Division	Apps	Goals	Apps	Goals	Apps	Goals	Apps	Goals
Brentford	1973–74	Fourth Division	2	0	0	0	0	0	2	0
Orient	1975–76	Second Division	3	0	0	0	0	0	3	0
Aldershot	1976–77	Fourth Division	5	0	0	0	0	0	5	0
St George	1979	National Soccer League	23	7	―		―		23	7
St George	1980	National Soccer League	17	4	―		―		17	4
St George	Total		40	11	―		―		40	11
Sydney Olympic (loan)	1981	National Soccer League	13	3	―		―		13	3
Wollongong City	1982	National Soccer League	28	10	―		―		28	10
Wollongong City	1983	National Soccer League	29	12	―		―		29	12
Wollongong City	Total		57	22	―		―		57	22
Penrith City	1984	National Soccer League	25	7	―		―		25	7
St George	1985	National Soccer League	19	3	―		―		19	3
St George	1986	National Soccer League	12	1	―		―		12	1
St George	Total		76	15	―		―		76	26
Wollongong City	1988	National Soccer League	3	0	―		―		3	0
Wollongong City	Total		60	22	―		―		60	22
Career total			184	47	0	0	0	0	184	47
