= John Fleming (footballer, born 1953) =

English footballer (born 1953)

Personal information
- Full name: John Joseph Fleming
- Date of birth: 1 July 1953 (age 73)
- Place of birth: Nottingham, England
- Height: 5 ft 8 in (1.73 m)
- Position: Midfielder

Youth career
- Oxford United

Senior career*
Years	Team	Apps	(Gls)
1971–1975	Oxford United	75	(2)
1975–1980	Lincoln City	121	(17)
1980	→ Port Vale (loan)	3	(0)
1981–1986	Wollongong City	103	(7)
Total		302	(26)

Managerial career
- 1986–1989: Wollongong City
- Fairy Meadow
- Wollongong Olympic
- 1998–2003: Kemblawarra
- 2005: Kemblawarra
- 2006–2009: Port Kembla
- 2009–2012: Wollongong United
- * Club domestic league appearances and goals

John Joseph Fleming (born 1 July 1953) is an English former footballer who played 199 league games in the Football League in a ten-year professional career throughout the 1970s. He later became a player and coach in Australia.

He began his playing career at Oxford United in 1971, making 75 league appearances in four years at the club. He spent 1975 to 1980 at Lincoln City, making over 100 appearances for the club. He won the Fourth Division title with the "Imps" in 1975–76. Loaned out to Port Vale in 1980, he emigrated to Australia and signed with Wollongong City. He retired as a player in 1986 and later coached Wollongong Olympic, Kemblawarra (in two spells), Port Kembla, and Wollongong United.

== Playing career ==
Fleming began his career at Oxford United, who finished 15th in the Second Division in 1971–72 under the stewardship of Gerry Summers. They rose to eighth in 1972–73 before finishing just two points and two places above the relegation zone in 1973–74. The "U's" finished 11th in 1974–75. Fleming scored two goals in 75 league games during his spell at the Manor Ground. He then transferred to Graham Taylor's Lincoln City, who won the Fourth Division title in 1975–76. The "Imps" then consolidated their Third Division status with a ninth-place finish in 1976–77. They then dropped down to 16th place in 1977–78 under George Kerr and Willie Bell's stewardship. However, they struggled under new boss Colin Murphy. Fleming scored six goals in the 1978–79 relegation season, enough to make him the club's joint top-scorer (along with Glenn Cockerill, Mick Harford, and Gordon Hobson). He was sent on loan to John McGrath's Port Vale in March 1980. His debut game for the "Valiants" came against parent club Lincoln on 15 March; the Vale lost 3–0. He played just a further two games, having failed to impress at Vale Park. He left Sincil Bank at the end of 1979–80 season, having scored 18 goals in 141 league and cup games at the club. Fleming joined Wollongong City in the Australian National Soccer League where he spent the next six years, amassing over a hundred appearances. City finished 11th in 1981, third in 1982, 15th in 1983, 12th (of 12) in the Northern Conference in 1984, tenth in 1985, and eighth in 1986.

== Coaching career ==
Fleming took over as head coach of Wollongong City during their 1986 campaign, replacing former Socceroo Adrian Alston. The club finished mid-table of the Northern Conference but was relegated to the State League when the 24-team, two-conference league reverted to a 14-team home and away series. Wollongong were promptly promoted back to the NSL the following year after winning the State League. Fleming continued on as coach for the 1988 season, before departing after round 19 of the 1989 season.

In July 1998, he was sacked as coach of Wollongong Olympic despite the club standing in equal fifth place of the league and also being a semi-finalist in the Bampton Cup.

A week after departing Olympic, Fleming was appointed coach of Kemblawarra, taking over from Joe Coelho, who had been acting as player-coach since the sacking of Jim Dafkovski. He departed the club at the end of the 2003 season.

After a year away, Fleming returned to Kemblawarra as coach for the 2005 season, replacing player-coach Richard Lloyd, who missed the season due to work commitments in Canada. However, his second spell at the helm would be short-lived as, at the end of August 2005, he resigned from the club after a dispute over the club's handling of a training ground disciplinary incident involving a youth grade player.

In April 2006, he succeeded the sacked Harry Sattin as coach of Port Kembla. He was sacked in May 2009.

In November 2009, he became coach of Wollongong United. He "walked out on the club" in May 2012 after falling out with president Peter Vrtkovski.

== Career statistics ==
Appearances and goals by club, season and competition
Club	Season	League			FA Cup		Other		Total	
Club	Season	Division	Apps	Goals	Apps	Goals	Apps	Goals	Apps	Goals
Oxford United	1971–72	Second Division	12	0	1	0	0	0	13	1
Oxford United	1972–73	Second Division	27	2	2	0	4	0	33	2
Oxford United	1973–74	Second Division	22	0	0	0	1	0	23	0
Oxford United	1974–75	Second Division	14	0	0	0	1	0	15	0
Oxford United	Total		75	2	3	0	6	0	84	2
Lincoln City	1975–76	Fourth Division	40	8	4	1	4	0	48	1
Lincoln City	1976–77	Third Division	24	0	2	0	2	0	28	0
Lincoln City	1977–78	Third Division	26	3	0	0	3	0	29	3
Lincoln City	1978–79	Third Division	31	6	1	0	2	0	34	6
Lincoln City	1979–80	Fourth Division	0	0	0	0	2	0	2	0
Lincoln City	Total		121	17	7	1	13	0	141	18
Port Vale (loan)	1979–80	Fourth Division	3	0	0	0	0	0	3	0
Career total			199	19	10	1	19	0	228	20

== Honours ==
Lincoln City

- Football League Fourth Division: 1975–76
