= Richard Lorenc =

Australian former football referee (born 1951)

- Full name: Richard Renald Lorenc
- Born: 3 December 1951 (age 74); West Ryde, New South Wales, Australia
- Other occupation: Teacher

Domestic
Years	League	Role
1977–1995	National Soccer League	Referee

International
Years	League	Role
1987–1995	FIFA listed	Referee

Richard Renald Lorenc (born 3 December 1951) is an Australian former football (soccer) referee. He is, as of July 2009, referees coordinator for Football New South Wales.

Lorenc's career highlight was as an assistant referee at the 1990 FIFA World Cup in Italy. He also served as a FIFA referee at the 1987 and 1993 World Youth Championships, and officiated in 1994 World Cup qualifiers. He is known to have officiated international matches during the period from 1987 to 1995.
