= Deaths in June 1988 =

The following is a list of notable deaths in June 1988.

Entries for each day are listed alphabetically by surname. A typical entry lists information in the following sequence:

- Name, age, country of citizenship at birth, subsequent country of citizenship (if applicable), reason for notability, cause of death (if known), and reference.

== June 1988 ==
=== 1 ===
- Belve Bean, 83, American MLB player (Cleveland Indians, Washington Senators).
- Leon Belasco, 85, Russian-American actor (My Sister Eileen) and musician.
- Herbert Feigl, 85, Austrian-American philosopher (nomological danglers), cancer.
- Luis Franco, 89, Argentinian essayist and poet.
- Peter Hurkos, 77, Dutch-American who claimed psychic powers, heart attack.
- Ricky May, 44, New Zealand-born Australian jazz singer and musician, heart attack.
- Victor Willing, 60, British painter of nudes, multiple sclerosis.

=== 2 ===
- Iosif Grigulevich, 75, Soviet secret police operative.
- Fred Halstead, 61, American Socialist Workers Party candidate for President of the United States, liver cancer.
- Horace Hildreth, 85, American politician and diplomat, ambassador to Pakistan, heart attack.
- Raj Kapoor, 63, Indian actor, producer and director (Awaara), asthma.
- Nigel Tangye, 79, British airman, novelist and journalist, worked for MI5.
- Eero Tuomaala, 61, Finnish Olympic long-distance runner (1952).

=== 3 ===
- Alexandre Bennigsen, 75, Soviet scholar of Islam.
- Kitty Canutt, 88, American professional bronc rider.
- Lawrence Coombes, 89, British-Australian aeronautical engineer and WWI flying ace.
- William Englefield, 70, Australian cricketer.
- Anna Mahler, 85, Austrian-born English sculptor, daughter of Gustav Mahler.
- Davey Moore, 28, American professional boxer, asphyxia from being pinned under vehicle.
- Jessica Nelson North, 96, American writer and poet.
- Brian Spencer, 38, Canadian NHL ice hockey player (Toronto Maple Leafs, New York Islanders), shot in robbery.
- Arie Vooren, 65, Dutch racing cyclist.
- Carl Wagener, 86, Nazi German army general, Knight's Cross of the Iron Cross recipient.

=== 4 ===
- Majnun Gorakhpuri, 84, Pakistani short story writer, poet and literary critic.
- Floyd Miller, 76, American member of the Communist Party USA.
- Douglas Nicholls, 81, Australian pastor, campaigner for aboriginal reconciliation, Governor of South Australia.
- Renzo Palmer, 57, Italian film, television and stage actor, cancer.
- Allan Reuss, 72, American jazz guitarist and composer ("More and More").

=== 5 ===
- Michael Barrington, 63, British actor (Porridge, Edward the Seventh), heart attack.
- Robert Dudley Edwards, 79, Irish historian.
- James H. Gildea, 97, American politician, member of the United States House of Representatives (1935–1939).
- Josef Lebeda, 76, Austrian footballer.
- Alberto Martijena, 81, Argentine Olympic sports shooter (1956).
- Vilim Messner, 84, Croatian Olympic javelin thrower (1928).
- Clarence M. Pendleton Jr., 57, American chairman of the United States Commission on Civil Rights, heart attack.
- Roland Ritchie, 77, Canadian lawyer and Justice of the Supreme Court of Canada.
- Dan Webster, 76, American Negro Leagues baseball player.

=== 6 ===
- Thomas DiBella, 82, American mobster of the Colombo crime family.
- Gheorghe Eminescu, 98, Romanian historian, respiratory infection.
- Chandra Fernando, 46, Sri Lankan priest, assassinated.
- John Jordan, 58, Irish poet and short-story writer.
- Jacques Le Roy Ladurie, 86, French politician, Minister of Agriculture, member of the French Resistance.
- Lê Thị Lựu, 77, Vietnamese painter.
- Jacques Ledoux, 66–67, Belgian cinema specialist, curator of the Royal Film Archive of Belgium.
- Joe Partridge, 55, Rhodesian cricketer (South Africa).

=== 7 ===
- Martin Sommer, 73, Nazi German SS Hauptscharführer, the "Hangman of Buchenwald".
- Vernon Washington, 64, American actor (The Last Starfighter, Friday the 13th: A New Beginning).
- William H. Wood, 87, American football player and coach (Army Cadets).

=== 8 ===
- Walt Chipple, 69, American MLB player (Washington Senators).
- Russell Harty, 53, English television talk show host, liver failure caused by hepatitis.
- Yvonne Hubert, 93, Belgian-born Canadian pianist.
- Roger Lyndon, 70, American mathematician (Lyndon words, Craig-Lyndon interpolation).
- Eli Mintz, 83, Austro-Hungarian–born American actor (All My Children), pneumonia.
- Philippe Nguyễn Kim Điền, 67, Vietnamese Roman Catholic prelate, Archbishop of Huế.
- Chuck Roberson, 69, American actor and stuntman, cancer.

=== 9 ===
- Newt Allen, 87, American Negro League baseball player (Kansas City Monarchs).
- Eric Cormack, 83, Australian rules footballer.
- Leon Falk Jr., 86, American steel company executive (Falk Laboratory School), stroke.
- Karl Kraus, 50, German theoretical physicist (quantum mechanics), cancer.
- Cyril Magnin, 88, American businessman, chief executive of Joseph Magnin, cardiac failure.
- Ferdynand Zweig, 91, Polish sociologist and economist.

=== 10 ===
- Byron G. Allen, 86, American politician, member of the Iowa House of Representatives.
- Arthur Gary Bishop, 35, American convicted sex offender and serial killer, executed.
- Rudolph Dunbar, 80, Guyanese conductor, clarinetist and composer, cancer.
- Louis L'Amour, 80, American novelist (Last of the Breed, Shalako), lung cancer (non-smoker).
- Willie Ross, 77, Scottish politician, Secretary of State for Scotland, cancer.
- Henryk Stażewski, 94, Polish painter, visual artist and writer.
- Josep Tarradellas, 89, Spanish politician, President of the Government of Catalonia, chronic lung ailment.

=== 11 ===
- Mike Clancy (Christopher J. Clancy), 63, American professional wrestler, NWA World Junior Heavyweight champion.
- Nathan Cook, 38, American actor (Hotel), allergic reaction to penicillin.
- Ernani Cuenco, 52, Filipino composer, film scorer and musical director (Bato sa Buhangin).
- Christine Fabréga, 57, French actress and television personality.
- Lee Priester, 85, American Olympic javelin thrower (1924).
- János Reznák, 57, Hungarian Olympic wrestler (1960, 1964).
- Giuseppe Saragat, 89, Italian politician, President of Italy, heart disease.
- Marianne Van Hirtum, 52, Belgian author.

=== 12 ===
- Eugenie Baird, 64, American singer.
- Harold Corbin, 81, American Olympic fencer (1932).
- William Reginald Cox, 82, British army officer.
- Georg Hochgesang, 90, German footballer and manager.
- Marcel Poot, 87, Belgian composer, professor and musician.
- Merle Settlemire, 85, American MLB player (Boston Red Sox).

=== 13 ===
- Martin Brown, 88, Australian rules footballer.
- Lucien Cardin, 69, Canadian politician, member of the House of Commons of Canada (1952–1967).
- Thomas McKeown, 75, British physician.
- Douglas Neame, 86, British Olympic hurdler (1928).
- Robert Saint-Pé, 88, French Olympic hammer thrower (1924).
- Walter Seabrook, 84, English cricketer.
- Emil Telmányi, 95, Hungarian violinist.
- Ricardo Vagnotti, 71, Brazilian Olympic fencer (1936).

=== 14 ===
- Robert R. Barry, 73, American politician, member of the U.S. House of Representatives (1959–1965), lung cancer.
- James Chandler, 76, American actor.
- Johnny Farrell, 87, American golfer, U.S. Open winner, stroke.
- Sara Gallardo, 56, Argentinian author and journalist, asthma.
- Alma Lloyd, 74, American actress (If I Were King, Song of the Saddle, The Big Noise).

=== 15 ===
- Frank A. Beach, 77, American ethologist and author (behavioral endocrinology).
- Hall Haynes, 59, American NFL player (Washington Redskins, Los Angeles Rams).
- Merwin Hodel, 57, American NFL player (New York Giants).
- Floyd J. McCree, 65, American politician, mayor of the city of Flint, Michigan, cardiac arrest.
- Oskar Ospelt, 79, Liechtenstein Olympic athlete (1936).
- Robert Seymour, 33, Northern Irish loyalist, shot by I.R.A.
- Willie Velasquez, 44, American social activist, founded the Southwest Voter Registration Education Project, kidney cancer.
- Clement Vismara, 90, Italian Roman Catholic priest and missionary.
- George Ward, 80, British politician, Secretary of State for Air.
- Hugh Willingham, 82, American MLB player (Chicago White Sox, Philadelphia Phillies).

=== 16 ===
- Per-Olof Edfeldt, 73, Swedish Olympic sprinter (1936).
- Kim Milford, 37, American actor (The Rocky Horror Show, Jesus Christ Superstar), complications following open heart surgery.
- Andrea Pazienza, 32, Italian comics artist and painter, heroin overdose.
- Miguel Piñero, 41, Puerto Rican–born American playwright and actor (Short Eyes), cirrhosis.
- Wojciech Trojanowski, 83, Polish Olympic hurdler (1928).

=== 17 ===
- Brian Baronet, 27, South African professional boxer, complications from knock out.
- František Čapek, 73, Czech Olympic sport shooter (1952, 1956).
- Cyril Crawford, 86, New Zealand cricketer.
- Elizabeth Lane, 82, English barrister and judge (High Court).
- Ed Montague, 82, American MLB player (Cleveland Indians).

=== 18 ===
- Archie Cochrane, 79, Scottish physician (randomized controlled trial).
- Valdemar Aguirre Cordova, 65, American district judge (United States District Court for the District of Arizona).
- Elizabeth Gardner, 30, British theoretical physicist (Gardner transition), cancer.
- Prince Kan'in Haruhito, 85, Japanese general in the Imperial Japanese Army.
- Kjell Kleppe, 53, Norwegian biochemist and molecular biologist (PCR).
- John Knott, 87, English cricketer.
- Wilford Leach, 58, American director and screenwriter (The Pirates of Penzance, The Mystery of Edwin Drood), cancer.
- Sallie Martin, 92, American gospel singer.
- E. Hoffmann Price, 89, American writer of popular fiction (Through the Gates of the Silver Key).
- Iasyr Shivaza, 82, Soviet poet and writer.

=== 19 ===
- Harold Ade, 76, American Olympic cyclist (1932).
- M. Ajmal, 78, Indian-born Pakistani actor (Heer Ranjha).
- Oscar Hirsh Davis, 74, American judge (United States Court of Claims, United States Court of Appeals for the Federal Circuit).
- Alice DeCambra, 66, American AAGPBL player.
- Marco Donat-Cattin, 34, Italian terrorist (Prima Linea), pedestrian road accident.
- William Harold Hutt, 88, English economist, stroke.
- Marie Logoreci, 67, Albanian actress (The Great Warrior Skanderbeg).
- Teru Shimada, 82, Japanese-born American actor (You Only Live Twice).
- Gladys Spellman, 70, American politician, member of U.S. House of Representatives (1975–1981), complications from coma.
- Aaly Tokombaev, 83, Kyrgyz poet, composer and novelist.

=== 20 ===
- Aracy de Almeida, 73, Brazilian singer, heart attack.
- Alex Bein, 85, German-born Israeli Jewish historian and Zionist historiographer (biography of Theodor Herzl).
- Alfred Renard, 93, Belgian aviator, hit by car.
- Robert Yellowtail, 98, American leader of the Crow Nation.

=== 21 ===
- Bobby Dodd, 79, American college football player and coach (Georgia Tech), lung cancer.
- John Duncan Sr., 69, American politician, member of U.S. House of Representatives (1965–1988), cancer.
- George Ivașcu, 76, Romanian journalist and communist militant, heart attack exacerbated by pneumonia.
- Leo Leino, 88, Finnish Olympic pentathlete (1924).
- Ed Linke, 76, American MLB player (Washington Senators, St. Louis Browns).
- Pedrito Rico, 55, Spanish singer, dancer and actor.
- Sverre Riisnæs, 90, Norwegian jurist and public prosecutor, member of Nasjonal Samling in World War II.
- Jean-Léo Rochon, 85, Canadian politician, member of the House of Commons of Canada (1962–1972).
- T. E. Utley, 67, British journalist and writer (The Daily Telegraph).

=== 22 ===
- Jesse Ed Davis, 43, American guitarist, drug overdose.
- Dennis Day, 72, American actor, comedian and singer (The Jack Benny Program), brain bleed.
- Hank Edwards, 69, American Major League baseball player (Cleveland Indians).
- Bramwell Fletcher, 84, English actor (Svengali).
- Rose Franken, 92, American writer and playwright (Claudia).
- Pieter Grobbelaar, 79, South African military commander, Commandant General of South African Defence Force.
- Hugh Hibbert, 94, British army officer.
- Bhadant Anand Kausalyayan, 83, Indian Buddhist monk.
- Jep Lacoste, 66, French rugby league coach.
- H. S. Lee, 87, Malaysian politician, minister of Finance and Transport.
- Leonard Matlovich, 44, American Vietnam War veteran, first gay service member to out himself to military, HIV.
- Howard Mitchell, 77, American cellist and conductor (National Symphony Orchestra), heart failure.
- Stuart Randall, 78, American actor (Cimarron City, Laramie).
- Russell Trabue, 88, American Negro Leagues baseball player.
- Xiao Jun, 80, Chinese author.

=== 23 ===
- Charles Corrigan, 72, Canadian NHL player (Toronto Maple Leafs, New York Americans).
- Viola Gentry, 93–94, American aviator.
- Albert C. Johnston, 87, American doctor and writer who tried to pass as white.
- Liang Shuming, 94, Chinese philosopher, politician and writer.
- Henry Murray, 95, American psychologist (Thematic Apperception Test), pneumonia.
- Heinz Pagels, 49, American physicist and author, president of the International League for Human Rights, mountain climbing accident.

=== 24 ===
- Marta Abba, 87, Italian actress, cerebral haemorrhage.
- Bùi Xuân Phái, 67, Vietnamese painter.
- Mihai Beniuc, 80, Romanian poet, dramatist and novelist, president of the Writers' Union of Romania.
- Lars Berg, 72, Swedish Olympic sports shooter (1948).
- Roberto Cueva del Río, 80, Mexican muralist, domestic accident.
- Knut Ellingsrud, 85, Norwegian footballer.
- Jimmy Goonan, 91, Australian rules footballer.
- Csaba Kesjár, 26, Hungarian racing driver, racing accident.
- Tex Leyendecker, 82, American NFL player (Philadelphia Eagles).
- Anthony Rohrs, 26, New Zealand cricketer.
- Irene Taylor, 81–82, American singer ("Mississippi Mud", "Willow Weep for Me").

=== 25 ===
- Jean Boffety, 63, French cinematographer (A Simple Story).
- Capel Brunker, 89, British Olympic equestrian (1924, 1936).
- Șerban Cioculescu, 85, Romanian literary critic and columnist.
- Mildred Gillars, 87, American broadcaster employed by Nazi Germany, convicted of treason against U.S.A, colon cancer.
- Svavar Guðnason, 78, Icelandic painter.
- Ali Hashemi, 26, Iranian military commander.
- Neville Pickering, 64, New Zealand politician, member of New Zealand Parliament, Mayor of Christchurch.
- Hillel Slovak, 26, Israeli-born American musician, guitarist for the Red Hot Chili Peppers, overdose.
- Jimmy Soul, 45, American vocalist ("If You Wanna Be Happy"), heart attack.

=== 26 ===
- Hans Urs von Balthasar, 82, Swiss theologian and Catholic priest, heart attack.
- Hugh Bartlett, 73, English cricketer.
- Marion Hall Best, 83, Australian interior designer.
- Sandy Campbell, 66, Broadway actor.
- Gyula Gyenes, 77, Hungarian Olympic sprinter (1936).
- Heinrich Heim, 88, Nazi German lawyer, aide to Martin Bormann, recorded Hitler's Table Talk.
- Ludovik Jakova, 76, Albanian footballer and manager.
- Walter Matoni, 70, Nazi German Luftwaffe ace, Knight's Cross of the Iron Cross recipient.
- Yves Pratte, 63, Canadian lawyer and jurist, Justice of the Supreme Court of Canada, heart attack.
- Hans Rosenberg, 84, German historian.

=== 27 ===
- Léonie Adams, 88, American poet, Poet Laureate Consultant in Poetry to the Library of Congress.
- Akilan, 65–66, Indian novelist.
- Michael Barry, 78, British television producer and director.
- Red Bullock, 76, American MLB player (Philadelphia Athletics).
- Antonio Giorgio, 90, Argentine Olympic rower (1936).
- John Groth, 80, American illustrator.
- Aparicio Méndez, 83, Uruguayan lawyer and politician, President of Uruguay.
- R. Muttusamy, 62, Sri Lankan music director and singer.
- Reno Strand, 79, American basketball player.
- Louis Versyp, 79, Belgian Olympic footballer (1928).

=== 28 ===
- A. Aiyappan, 83, superintendent of Government Museum, Chennai.
- William Nordeen, 51, American captain in the US Navy, car bomb.
- Iris Origo, 85, English-born Italian biographer and writer (War in Val d'Orcia).
- Fridtjof Paulsen, 92, Norwegian Olympic speed skater (1924).
- Kurt Raab, 46, West German actor, screenwriter and playwright, AIDS.

=== 29 ===
- Tengku Ampuan Afzan, 55, Malaysian Queen consort of Pahang, cancer.
- Alexander Gorkin, 90, Soviet politician, chairman of the Supreme Court of the Soviet Union.
- John Peet, 72–73, British journalist who defected to East Germany.
- Franciszka Themerson, 81, Polish-born British painter, illustrator and filmmaker.

=== 30 ===
- Pete Backor, 69, Canadian NHL player (Toronto Maple Leafs).
- Alan W. Bishop, 68, British geotechnical engineer (slope stability).
- Chacrinha, 70, Brazilian comedian, radio and TV personality, heart attack.
- Johanna Hofer, 91, German-born American actress.
- Ron Ingram, 54, Canadian NHL player (Chicago Black Hawks, Detroit Red Wings, New York Rangers).
- Keith Long, 78, Australian rules footballer.
- Alfred McMurray, 73, Irish cricketer.
- A. S. Nair, 57, Indian painter, illustrator and cartoonist.
- Bill Ramsay, 60, Australian Olympic sprinter (1948).
- Suthi Veerabhadra Rao, 41, Indian film actor, heart attack.

=== Unknown date ===
- Tommy Brookins, 81, founder of the Harlem Globetrotters, stroke. (died by June 5)
- Dave Crawford, 44, American R&B musician and songwriter ("Young Hearts Run Free", "What a Man"), murdered.
- Eric Jennings, 65, English FIFA-listed football referee.
