= 1978 Sydney Olympic FC season =

Sydney Olympic
1978 season
- Head Coach: Tom Anderson; George Gibson; Joe Marston; Kaz Kulak
- Stadium: Arlington Oval; Erskineville Oval; Wentworth Park; Garside Park; St George Stadium
- National Soccer League: 8th
- NSL Cup: Second round
- Top goalscorer: League: Alan Ainslie (7); All: Alan Ainslie (7)
- Highest home attendance: 6,702 vs. Marconi Fairfield (21 May 1978); National Soccer League
- Lowest home attendance: 1,000 vs. Auburn (24 May 1978); National Soccer League
- Average home league attendance: 3,915
- Biggest win: 2–0 (3 times); 3–1 (once)
- Biggest defeat: 0–5 vs. Eastern Suburbs (A) (28 May 1978); National Soccer League

The 1978 season was the second in the National Soccer League for Sydney Olympic Football Club. In addition to the domestic league, they also participated in the NSL Cup. Sydney Olympic finished 8th in their National Soccer League season, and were eliminated in the second round of the NSL Cup.

== Players ==
Note: Flags indicate national team as defined under FIFA eligibility rules; some limited exceptions apply. Players may hold more than one non-FIFA nationality.

No.	Pos.	Nation	Player
1	GK	AUS	Gary Meier
2	DF	AUS	Billy Palmer
3	DF	ENG	Mike Cross
4	DF	SCO	Stuart Markland
5	DF	AUS	Dave McIntosh
6		AUS	Bill Starvopodis
7	FW	SCO	Derek Laing
8	MF	SCO	Alex Jamieson
9		AUS	Con Davourlis
10	MF	AUS	Joe Senkalski
11	MF	AUS	Alan Ainslie
12	FW	ENG	Ray Botham
13	DF	SCO	Ken Wilson

No.	Pos.	Nation	Player
14	DF	ENG	Paul Luckett
15	MF	AUS	Peter Raskopoulos
17	DF	AUS	Richard Bell
20		AUS	Herc Karakostas
—	FW	AUS	Don Allan
—		AUS	Greg Allan
—		AUS	Nick Constantinou
—	DF	ENG	Paul Cotton
—	MF	IRL	Jim Herron
—	DF	AUS	John Karaspyros
—	FW	SCO	Billy Pirie
—	FW	AUS	Chris Thamnidis

== Competitions ==
=== Overall record ===
Competition	First match	Last match	Starting round	Final position	Record							
Competition	First match	Last match	Starting round	Final position	Pld	W	D	L	GF	GA	GD	Win %
National Soccer League	5 March 1978	25 September 1978	Matchday 1	8th	26	9	7	10	35	43	−8	34.62
NSL Cup	24 May 1978	19 July 1978	First round	Second round	2	1	0	1	2	4	−2	50.00
Total					28	10	7	11	37	47	−10	35.71

Source: Competitions

=== National Soccer League ===
==== League table ====
Pos	Team	Pld	W	D	L	GF	GA	GD	Pts
6	Brisbane Lions	26	8	10	8	37	39	−2	26
7	St George-Budapest	26	11	3	12	41	40	+1	25
8	Sydney Olympic	26	9	7	10	35	43	−8	25
9	Western Suburbs	26	9	6	11	41	45	−4	24
10	Adelaide City	26	9	6	11	38	44	−6	24

Source: rsssf.com
Rules for classification: 1) Points; 2) Goal difference; 3) Goals scored

==== Results summary ====
Overall								Home						Away					
Pld	W	D	L	GF	GA	GD	Pts	W	D	L	GF	GA	GD	W	D	L	GF	GA	GD
26	9	7	10	35	43	−8	34	3	3	7	16	23	−7	6	4	3	19	20	−1

Source: worldfootball.net

==== Results by round ====
Round	1	2	3	4	5	6	7	8	9	10	11	12	13	14	15	16	17	18	19	20	21	22	23	24	25	26
Ground	H	A	A	H	H	A	A	H	A	H	A	H	A	H	A	H	A	A	H	H	A	H	A	H	A	H
Result	L	D	W	L	W	W	D	L	L	D	L	D	L	L	D	L	W	W	W	D	W	L	W	W	D	W
Position	9	12	7	10	5	5	5	6	9	11	12	10	13	13	13	13	11	11	9	9	8	10	8	7	7	8
Points	0	1	3	3	5	7	8	8	8	9	9	10	10	10	11	11	13	15	17	18	20	20	22	24	25	27

Source: worldfootball.net
A = Away; H = Home; W = Win; D = Draw; L = Loss

==== Matches ====
Win Draw Loss

5 March 1978 1	Sydney Olympic	0–1	Western Suburbs	Sydney
		Report	Fisher 75'	Stadium: Arlington Oval; Attendance: 4,124; Referee: Jim Reeves

12 March 1978 2	South Melbourne	1–1	Sydney Olympic	Melbourne
	Rogers 63'	Report	Ainslie 78'	Stadium: Middle Park Soccer Stadium; Attendance: 4,500; Referee: Chris Bambridge

19 March 1978 3	West Adelaide	0–1	Sydney Olympic	Adelaide
		Report	Senkalski 46'	Stadium: Hindmarsh Stadium; Attendance: 4,500; Referee: Graham Neal

26 March 1978 4	Sydney Olympic	1–2	Canberra City	Sydney
	Senkalski 19' (pen.)	Report	Grujicic 9' (pen.); Byrne 17'	Stadium: Erskineville Oval; Attendance: 4,133; Referee: Alf Rodway

2 April 1978 5	Sydney Olympic	2–0	St George-Budapest	Sydney
	Ainslie 3'; Laing 57'	Report		Stadium: Arlington Oval; Attendance: 4,629; Referee: Henry Witschge

8 April 1978 6	Adelaide City	0–1	Sydney Olympic	Adelaide
		Report	D. Allan 57'	Stadium: Hindmarsh Stadium; Attendance: 5,895; Referee: Bobby Kerr

15 April 1978 7	Newcastle KB United	1–1	Sydney Olympic	Newcastle
	Boden 27'	Report	Senkalski 31'	Stadium: Newcastle International Sports Centre; Attendance: 5,287; Referee: Tony Boskovic

23 April 1978 8	Sydney Olympic	2–4	Brisbane Lions	Sydney
	Ainslie 53'; Wilson 80'	Report	Fairbrother 31'; Hughes 34'; Ontong 41'; Laszlo 88'	Stadium: Erskineville Oval; Attendance: 3,685; Referee: Peter Rampley

30 April 1978 9	Fitzroy United	3–1	Sydney Olympic	Sydney
	Cole 8', 38'; Campbell 48'	Report	Ainslie 49'	Stadium: Wentworth Park; Attendance: 3,580; Referee: Doug Rennie
Note: This match was moved to play at Wentworth Park in Sydney as Fitzroy United's home fixture due to punishment by NSL for an assault on a referee.

7 May 1978 10	Sydney Olympic	1–1	Footscray JUST	Sydney
	Laing 58'	Report	Picioane 24'	Stadium: Wentworth Park; Attendance: 6,311; Referee: Alf Rodway

14 May 1978 11	Brisbane City	3–2	Sydney Olympic	Brisbane
	Marley 22', 44'; Conner 61'	Report	D. Allan 72', 80'	Stadium: Perry Park; Attendance: 4,500; Referee: Jack Wood

21 May 1978 12	Sydney Olympic	1–1	Marconi Fairfield	Sydney
	Jamieson 40'	Report	Vieri 58'	Stadium: Wentworth Park; Attendance: 6,702; Referee: Tony Boskovic

28 May 1978 13	Eastern Suburbs	5–0	Sydney Olympic	Sydney
	Watson 21', 46'; Trenter 42'; Silva 55'; D. Allan 85' (o.g.)	Report		Stadium: Wentworth Park; Attendance: 5,928; Referee: Tim Davies

4 June 1978 14	Sydney Olympic	1–2	South Melbourne	Sydney
	Davourlis 45'	Report	Campbell 5'; Cummings 39'	Stadium: Erskineville Oval; Referee: Barry Wilkinson

11 June 1978 15	Western Suburbs	2–2	Sydney Olympic	Sydney
	Stone 51'; Eaton 78'	Report	Pirie 21'; Jamieson 23'	Stadium: Wentworth Park; Attendance: 4,725

17 June 1978 16	Sydney Olympic	2–4	West Adelaide	Sydney
	Pirie 5', 43'	Report	McGachey 23', 24'; McGregor 70'; Boyle 87'	Stadium: Erskineville Oval; Attendance: 1,860; Referee: Richard Lorenc

24 June 1978 17	Canberra City	1–3	Sydney Olympic	Canberra
	Byrne 85'	Report	Pirie 7', 63'; D. Allan 70'	Stadium: Bruce Stadium; Attendance: 4,300; Referee: Doug Rennie

2 July 1978 18	St George-Budapest	1–2	Sydney Olympic	Sydney
	Hensman 35'	Report	Jamieson 50'; Ainslie 90'	Stadium: St George Stadium; Attendance: 963; Referee: Tim Davies

9 July 1978 19	Sydney Olympic	2–1	Adelaide City	Sydney
	Pirie 8'; D. Allan 75'	Report	Muir 47'	Stadium: St George Stadium; Attendance: 2,152; Referee: Jim Reeves

16 July 1978 20	Sydney Olympic	1–1	Newcastle KB United	Sydney
	Ainslie 22'	Report	Boden ?'	Stadium: St George Stadium; Attendance: 4,953; Referee: Peter Rampley

23 July 1978 21	Brisbane Lions	1–2	Sydney Olympic	Brisbane
	Morris 31'	Report	McIntosh 39'; Bell 89'	Stadium: Perry Park; Attendance: 2,100; Referee: Dave Nugent

30 July 1978 22	Sydney Olympic	1–3	Fitzroy United	Sydney
	McIntosh 62'	Report	Campbell 37'; Buljevic 72'; Cole 82'	Stadium: St George Stadium; Attendance: 3,676; Referee: Tony Boskovic

6 August 1978 23	Footscray JUST	2–3	Sydney Olympic	Melbourne
	Kondarios 49'; Lujic 81'	Report	McIntosh 14', 48'; Laing 62'	Stadium: Middle Park Soccer Stadium; Attendance: 800; Referee: Tony Beazleigh

13 August 1978 24	Sydney Olympic	2–1	Brisbane City	Sydney
	Ainslie 10'; McIntosh 65'	Report	Kelso 26'	Stadium: Wentworth Park; Attendance: 1,138; Referee: Jim Reeves

20 August 1978 25	Marconi Fairfield	0–0	Sydney Olympic	Sydney
		Report		Stadium: Marconi Oval; Attendance: 5,241; Referee: Tony Boskovic

27 August 1978 26	Sydney Olympic	0–2	Eastern Suburbs	Sydney
		Report	Smith 61'; Barnes 71'	Stadium: Wentworth Park; Attendance: 3,530; Referee: Chris Bambridge

=== NSL Cup ===
Win Draw Loss

24 May 1978 First round	Sydney Olympic	2–0	(New South Wales) Auburn	Sydney
	Laing 45'; D. Allan 68'	Report		Stadium: Garside Park; Attendance: 1,000

19 July 1978 Second round	Eastern Suburbs	4–0	Sydney Olympic	Sydney
	Souness 17'; Barnes 21'; Smith 25'	Report		Stadium: Wentworth Park; Attendance: 1,023; Referee: Tim Davies

== Statistics ==
=== Appearances and goals ===
Includes all competitions. Players with no appearances not included in the list.

No.	Pos.	Nat.	Player	National Soccer League		NSL Cup		Total	
No.	Pos.	Nat.	Player	Apps	Goals	Apps	Goals	Apps	Goals
1	GK	(Australia)	Gary Meier	23	0	1	0	24	0
2	DF	(Australia)	Billy Palmer	16	0	2	0	18	0
3	DF	(England)	Mike Cross	25	0	2	0	27	0
4	DF	(Scotland)	Stuart Markland	19+1	0	1	0	21	0
5	DF	(Australia)	Dave McIntosh	24	5	1	0	25	5
6	—	(Australia)	Bill Starvopodis	4+3	0	1	0	8	0
7	FW	(Scotland)	Derek Laing	26	3	2	1	28	4
8	MF	(Scotland)	Alex Jamieson	24	3	2	0	26	3
9	—	(Australia)	Con Davourlis	8	1	0	0	8	1
10	MF	(Australia)	Joe Senkalski	6+5	3	2	0	13	3
11	MF	(Australia)	Alan Ainslie	24+2	7	1	0	27	7
12	FW	(England)	Ray Botham	2+1	0	1	0	4	0
13	DF	(Scotland)	Ken Wilson	17+4	1	1	0	22	1
14	DF	(England)	Paul Luckett	15+2	0	2	0	19	0
15	MF	(Australia)	Peter Raskopoulos	1+2	0	0	0	3	0
17	DF	(Australia)	Richard Bell	12	1	1	0	13	1
20	—	(Australia)	Herc Karakostas	3	0	1	0	4	0
—	FW	(Australia)	Don Allan	11+3	5	1+1	1	16	6
—	—	(Australia)	Greg Allan	11+1	0	0	0	12	0
—	—	(Australia)	Nick Constantinou	2	0	0	0	2	0
—	DF	(England)	Paul Cotton	2	0	0	0	2	0
—	MF	(Republic of Ireland)	Jim Herron	1+1	0	0	0	2	0
—	DF	(Australia)	John Karaspyros	0+1	0	0	0	1	0
—	FW	(Scotland)	Billy Pirie	8	6	1	0	9	6
—	FW	(Australia)	Chris Thamnidis	2+2	0	0+1	0	5	0

=== Disciplinary record ===
Includes all competitions. The list is sorted by squad number when total cards are equal. Players with no cards not included in the list.

Rank	No.	Pos.	Nat.	Player	National Soccer League			NSL Cup			Total		
Rank	No.	Pos.	Nat.	Player	Yellow card	Second yellow card	Red card	Yellow card	Second yellow card	Red card	Yellow card	Second yellow card	Red card
1	4	DF	(Australia)	Stuart Markland	2	0	1	0	0	0	2	0	1
2	5	DF	(Australia)	Dave McIntosh	3	0	0	0	0	0	3	0	0
3	7	FW	(Scotland)	Derek Laing	2	0	0	0	0	0	2	0	0
3	8	MF	(Scotland)	Alex Jamieson	2	0	0	0	0	0	2	0	0
5	3	DF	(England)	Mike Cross	1	0	0	0	0	0	1	0	0
5	6	—	(Australia)	Bill Starvopodis	1	0	0	0	0	0	1	0	0
5	14	DF	(Australia)	Paul Luckett	1	0	0	0	0	0	1	0	0
5	—	—	(Australia)	Greg Allan	1	0	0	0	0	0	1	0	0
Total					13	0	1	0	0	0	13	0	1

=== Clean sheets ===
Includes all competitions. The list is sorted by squad number when total clean sheets are equal. Numbers in parentheses represent games where both goalkeepers participated and both kept a clean sheet; the number in parentheses is awarded to the goalkeeper who was substituted on, whilst a full clean sheet is awarded to the goalkeeper who was on the field at the start of play. Goalkeepers with no clean sheets not included in the list.

Rank	No.	Nat.	Goalkeeper	NSL	NSL Cup	Total
1	1	(Australia)	Gary Meier	4	0	4
2	20	(Australia)	Herc Karakostas	0	1	0
Total				4	1	5
