= 1979 Sydney Olympic FC season =

Sydney Olympic
1979 season
- Head Coach: Joe Marston; John Xipolitas
- National Soccer League: 13th
- NSL Cup: Second round
- Top goalscorer: League: Clive Eaton (7); All: Clive Eaton (8)
- Highest home attendance: 6,751 vs. APIA Leichhardt (8 April 1979); National Soccer League
- Lowest home attendance: 1,462 vs. Canberra City (26 August 1979); National Soccer League
- Average home league attendance: 2,976
- Biggest win: 2–0 (3 times)
- Biggest defeat: 0–3 vs. Newcastle KB United (A) (19 May 1979); NSL Cup; 0–3 vs. Marconi Fairfield (H) (10 June 1979); National Soccer League

The 1979 season was the third in the National Soccer League for Sydney Olympic Football Club. In addition to the domestic league, they also participated in the NSL Cup. Sydney Olympic finished 13th in their National Soccer League season to be relegated, and were eliminated in the second round of the NSL Cup.

== Players ==
Note: Flags indicate national team as defined under FIFA eligibility rules; some limited exceptions apply. Players may hold more than one non-FIFA nationality.

No.	Pos.	Nation	Player
1	GK	AUS	Gary Meier
2	DF	AUS	Dave McIntosh
3	DF	AUS	Billy Palmer
4	DF	AUS	Richard Bell
5	DF	SCO	Ken Wilson
6	DF	ENG	Mike Cross
7	FW	SCO	Derek Laing
8	MF	AUS	Peter Raskopoulos
9	MF	SCO	Alex Jamieson
10	FW	AUS	Clive Eaton
11	MF	AUS	Alan Ainslie
12	MF	AUS	Mark Koussas

No.	Pos.	Nation	Player
13	DF	AUS	Ian Rowden
14	DF	AUS	Graham Jennings
15	DF	SCO	Jim Morris
17	DF	AUS	John Karaspyros
18	FW	AUS	Andy Scott
20	GK	AUS	Peter Wilson
—	FW	ENG	Ray Botham
—	DF	ENG	Paul Cotton
—	DF	IRN	Karim Ghiassi
—	DF	SCO	George Gibsn
—	DF	ENG	Paul Luckett
—		AUS	Leopold Poulos

== Competitions ==
=== Overall record ===
Competition	First match	Last match	Starting round	Final position	Record							
Competition	First match	Last match	Starting round	Final position	Pld	W	D	L	GF	GA	GD	Win %
National Soccer League	11 March 1979	23 September 1979	Matchday 1	13th	26	7	5	14	23	30	−7	26.92
NSL Cup	25 April 1979	19 May 1979	First round	Second round	2	1	0	1	2	4	−2	50.00
Total					28	8	5	15	25	34	−9	28.57

Source: Competitions

=== National Soccer League ===
==== League table ====
Pos	Team	Pld	W	D	L	GF	GA	GD	Pts	Qualification or relegation
1	Marconi Fairfield (C)	26	15	6	5	58	32	+26	40 (Note: A Bonus Point was awarded for victories of 4 goals or more.)	Qualification to Finals series (Note: The Finals series was not considered the championship for the 1979 National Soccer League.)
2	Heidelberg United	26	14	7	5	44	30	+14	36	Qualification to Finals series
3	Sydney City	26	15	3	8	47	29	+18	34	Qualification to Finals series
4	Brisbane City	26	14	5	7	38	30	+8	34	Qualification to Finals series
5	Adelaide City	26	13	6	7	43	27	+16	33	
6	Newcastle KB United	26	11	9	6	43	30	+13	32	
7	West Adelaide	26	10	4	12	28	31	−3	25	
8	APIA Leichhardt	26	11	3	12	29	37	−8	25	
9	Brisbane Lions	26	8	6	12	28	40	−12	22	
10	Footscray JUST	26	8	3	15	29	43	−14	20	
11	St George-Budapest	26	7	6	13	27	43	−16	20	
12	Canberra City	26	6	8	12	25	41	−16	20	
13	Sydney Olympic (R)	26	7	5	14	23	30	−7	19	Relegated to the 1980 NSW State League
14	South Melbourne	26	6	3	17	26	45	−19	16	

Updated to match(es) played on unknown. Source: rsssf.com
Rules for classification: 1) points; 2) goal difference; 3) number of goals scored.
(C) Champions; (R) Relegated

==== Results summary ====
Overall								Home						Away					
Pld	W	D	L	GF	GA	GD	Pts	W	D	L	GF	GA	GD	W	D	L	GF	GA	GD
26	7	5	14	23	30	−7	26	2	3	8	8	15	−7	5	2	6	15	15	0

Source: worldfootball.net

==== Results by round ====
Round	1	2	3	4	5	6	7	8	9	10	11	12	13	14	15	16	17	18	19	20	22	23	21	24	25	26
Ground	H	A	H	A	H	A	A	H	A	H	A	H	A	H	A	H	A	A	H	H	H	A	A	H	A	H
Result	W	W	W	L	L	L	L	L	W	L	W	L	L	D	W	L	D	W	D	L	D	D	L	L	L	L
Position	6	1	1	3	7	9	11	11	10	10	10	10	11	11	10	10	10	10	10	10	10	10	10	11	12	13
Points	2	4	6	6	6	6	6	6	8	8	10	10	10	11	13	13	14	16	17	17	18	19	19	19	19	19

Source: worldfootball.net
A = Away; H = Home; W = Win; D = Draw; L = Loss

==== Matches ====
Win Draw Loss

11 March 1979 1	Sydney Olympic	2–0	Footscray JUST	Sydney
	McIntosh 36'; Eaton 75'	Report		Stadium: St George Stadium; Attendance: 2,426; Referee: Jim Reeves

18 March 1979 2	South Melbourne	0–3 (Note: Awarded score. Original score 1–0 to South Melbourne; result was changed after the Australian Soccer Federation determined that South Melbourne fielded ineligible player Tony Tuner.)	Sydney Olympic	Melbourne
	Evans 27'	Report		Stadium: Middle Park Soccer Stadium; Attendance: 4,500; Referee: Chris Bambridge

25 March 1979 3	Sydney Olympic	2–0	West Adelaide	Sydney
	Eaton 36'; McIntosh 52'	Report		Stadium: St George Stadium; Attendance: 2,731; Referee: Peter Rampley

1 April 1979 4	Brisbane City	2–1	Sydney Olympic	Brisbane
	Low 33', 68'	Report	Eaton 82'	Stadium: Perry Park; Attendance: 2,970; Referee: Des Miles

8 April 1979 5	Sydney Olympic	0–2	APIA Leichhardt	Sydney
		Report	Carruthers 14' (pen.); Stone 87'	Stadium: Pratten Park; Attendance: 6,751; Referee: Tim Davies

14 April 1979 6	Newcastle KB United	2–0	Sydney Olympic	Newcastle
	Heys 58'; Cowburn 81'	Report		Stadium: Newcastle International Sports Centre; Attendance: 18,376; Referee: Richard Lorenc

22 April 1979 7	Adelaide City	1–0	Sydney Olympic	Adelaide
	J. Nyskohus 7'	Report		Stadium: Hindmarsh Stadium; Attendance: 5,100; Referee: Graham Neal

29 April 1979 8	Sydney Olympic	1–2	Heidelberg United	Sydney
	Wilson 82'	Report	Bozikas 14', 90'	Stadium: Pratten Park; Attendance: 2,430; Referee: Henry Witschge

5 May 1979 9	Canberra City	1–3	Sydney Olympic	Canberra
	Grujicic 82' (pen.)	Report	Wilson 38'; Jennings 80'; Eaton 85'	Stadium: Bruce Stadium; Attendance: 5,000; Referee: Dave Nugent

13 May 1979 10	Sydney Olympic	0–1	Brisbane Lions	Sydney
		Report	Brennan 70'	Stadium: Pratten Park; Attendance: 2,142; Referee: Bill Jones

3 June 1979 11	Sydney City	3–4	Sydney Olympic	Sydney
	Watson 11', 15', 60'	Report	Eaton 23'; Ainslie 64' (pen.); Laing 67'; Jennings 82'	Stadium: Wentworth Park; Attendance: 2,249; Referee: Stewart Mellings

10 June 1979 12	Sydney Olympic	0–3	Marconi Fairfield	Sydney
		Report	Byrne 16' (pen.); Lindsay 67'; Jankovics 75'	Stadium: Pratten Park; Attendance: 4,452; Referee: Tim Davies

17 June 1979 13	St George-Budapest	2–0	Sydney Olympic	Sydney
	Cotton 13'; Morgan 75'	Report		Stadium: St George Stadium; Attendance: 3,874; Referee: Richard Lorenc

24 June 1979 14	Sydney Olympic	1–1	South Melbourne	Sydney
	Bell 15'	Report	Davidson 8'	Stadium: Pratten Park; Attendance: 2,572; Referee: Peter Rampley

1 July 1979 15	Footscray JUST	0–1	Sydney Olympic	Melbourne
		Report	Jennings 20'	Stadium: Olympic Park; Attendance: 1,000; Referee: Don Campbell

8 July 1979 16	Sydney Olympic	0–1	Brisbane City	Sydney
		Report	Kelso 73'	Stadium: Pratten Park; Attendance: 2,150; Referee: Bill Jones

15 July 1979 17	West Adelaide	0–0	Sydney Olympic	Adelaide
		Report		Stadium: Hindmarsh Stadium; Attendance: 4,200; Referee: Don Campbell

22 July 1979 18	APIA Leichhardt	0–2	Sydney Olympic	Sydney
		Report	Jennings 71'; Scott 80'	Stadium: Wentworth Park; Attendance: 5,386; Referee: Richard Lorenc

29 July 1979 19	Sydney Olympic	1–1	Newcastle KB United	Sydney
	Eaton 50'	Report	Jones 1'	Stadium: Pratten Park; Attendance: 3,575; Referee: Doug Rennie

5 August 1979 20	Sydney Olympic	1–2	Adelaide City	Sydney
	Bell 3' (pen.)	Report	J. Nyskohus 80'; Marwe 83'	Stadium: Pratten Park; Attendance: 3,250; Referee: Tony Beazleigh

26 August 1979 22	Sydney Olympic	0–0	Canberra City	Sydney
		Report		Stadium: Pratten Park; Attendance: 1,462; Referee: Peter Rampley

2 September 1979 23	Brisbane Lions	0–0	Sydney Olympic	Brisbane
		Report		Stadium: Perry Park; Attendance: 1,050; Referee: Bill Jones

5 September 1979 21	Heidelberg United	2–1	Sydney Olympic	Melbourne
	Paton 1'; Yzendoorn 77'	Report	Eaton 70'	Stadium: Olympic Park; Attendance: 2,000; Referee: Chris Bambridge

9 September 1979 24	Sydney Olympic	0–1	Sydney City	Sydney
		Report	Silva 48'	Stadium: St George Stadium; Attendance: 2,649; Referee: Jim Reeves

16 September 1979 25	Marconi Fairfield	2–0	Sydney Olympic	Sydney
		Report		Stadium: Marconi Oval; Attendance: 5,400; Referee: Tony Beazleigh

23 September 1979 26	Sydney Olympic	0–1	St George-Budapest	Sydney
		Report	Katholos 74'	Stadium: Marconi Oval; Attendance: 2,103; Referee: Stewart Mellings

=== NSL Cup ===
Win Draw Loss

25 April 1979 First round	Sutherland (New South Wales)	1–2	Sydney Olympic	Sydney
	Beggs ?'	Report	Botham ?'; Eaton ?'	Stadium: St George Stadium; Attendance: 1,982; Referee: Tony Boskovic

19 May 1979 Second round	Newcastle KB United	3–0	Sydney Olympic	Newcastle
	Senkalski 24', 66', 71'	Report		Stadium: Newcastle International Sports Centre; Attendance: 6,027; Referee: Ken Allen

== Statistics ==
=== Appearances and goals ===
Includes all competitions. Players with no appearances not included in the list.

No.	Pos.	Nat.	Player	National Soccer League		NSL Cup		Total	
No.	Pos.	Nat.	Player	Apps	Goals	Apps	Goals	Apps	Goals
1	GK	(Australia)	Gary Meier	19	0	2	0	21	0
2	DF	(Australia)	Dave McIntosh	21+4	2	2	0	27	2
3	DF	(Australia)	Billy Palmer	6+3	0	1+1	0	11	0
4	DF	(Australia)	Richard Bell	26	2	1	0	27	2
5	DF	(Scotland)	Ken Wilson	26	2	1	0	27	2
6	DF	(England)	Mike Cross	22+1	0	1+1	0	25	0
7	FW	(Scotland)	Derek Laing	25	1	2	0	27	1
8	MF	(Australia)	Peter Raskopoulos	25+1	0	2	0	28	0
9	MF	(Scotland)	Alex Jamieson	11+2	0	0	0	13	0
10	FW	(Australia)	Clive Eaton	18+6	7	2	1	26	8
11	MF	(Australia)	Alan Ainslie	12+3	1	2	0	17	1
12	MF	(Australia)	Mark Koussas	1	0	0	0	1	0
13	DF	(Australia)	Ian Rowden	16+1	0	2	0	19	0
14	DF	(Australia)	Graham Jennings	19+1	4	1+1	0	22	4
15	DF	(Scotland)	Jim Morris	4	0	0	0	4	0
17	DF	(Australia)	John Karaspyros	0+2	0	0	0	2	0
18	FW	(Australia)	Andy Scott	16+2	1	2	0	20	1
20	GK	(Australia)	Peter Wilson	7+1	0	0	0	8	0
—	FW	(England)	Ray Botham	2+4	0	1	1	7	1
—	DF	(England)	Paul Cotton	4	0	0	0	4	0
—	DF	(Iran)	Karim Ghiassi	2	0	0	0	2	0
—	DF	(Scotland)	George Gibson	4	0	0	0	4	0
—	DF	(England)	Paul Luckett	0+3	0	0+1	0	4	0
—	—	(Australia)	Leopold Poulos	0+1	0	0	0	1	0

=== Disciplinary record ===
Includes all competitions. The list is sorted by squad number when total cards are equal. Players with no cards not included in the list.

Rank	No.	Pos.	Nat.	Player	National Soccer League			NSL Cup			Total		
Rank	No.	Pos.	Nat.	Player	Yellow card	Second yellow card	Red card	Yellow card	Second yellow card	Red card	Yellow card	Second yellow card	Red card
1	13	DF	(Australia)	Ian Rowden	1	0	1	0	0	0	1	0	1
2	2	DF	(Australia)	Dave McIntosh	5	0	0	0	0	0	5	0	0
3	8	MF	(Australia)	Peter Raskopoulos	2	0	0	0	0	0	2	0	0
4	3	DF	(Australia)	Billy Palmer	1	0	0	0	0	0	1	0	0
4	5	DF	(Scotland)	Ken Wilson	1	0	0	0	0	0	1	0	0
4	7	FW	(Scotland)	Derek Laing	1	0	0	0	0	0	1	0	0
4	9	MF	(Scotland)	Alex Jamieson	1	0	0	0	0	0	1	0	0
4	10	FW	(Australia)	Clive Eaton	1	0	0	0	0	0	1	0	0
4	14	DF	(Australia)	Graham Jennings	1	0	0	0	0	0	1	0	0
4	18	FW	(Australia)	Andy Scott	1	0	0	0	0	0	1	0	0
Total					15	0	1	0	0	0	15	0	1

=== Clean sheets ===
Includes all competitions. The list is sorted by squad number when total clean sheets are equal. Numbers in parentheses represent games where both goalkeepers participated and both kept a clean sheet; the number in parentheses is awarded to the goalkeeper who was substituted on, whilst a full clean sheet is awarded to the goalkeeper who was on the field at the start of play. Goalkeepers with no clean sheets not included in the list.

Rank	No.	Nat.	Goalkeeper	NSL	NSL Cup	Total
1	1	(Australia)	Gary Meier	4	0	4
2	20	(Australia)	Peter Wilson	1	0	1
Total				5	0	5
