= George Gibson =

George Gibson may refer to:

== Sportspeople ==
- George Gibson (baseball) (1880–1967), Canadian baseball player
- George Gibson (American football) (1905–2004), American football player
- George Gibson (Tasmania cricketer) (1827–1873), Australian cricketer
- George Gibson (Victoria cricketer) (1827–1910), Australian cricketer
- George Ralph Gibson (1878–1939), English rugby union player
- George Gibson (footballer, born 1903) (1903–1977), Scottish footballer (Hamilton, Bolton, Chelsea)
- George Gibson (footballer, born 1912) (1912–1990), English footballer
- George Gibson (footballer, born 1945), Scottish footballer
- George Gibson (footballer, born 2000), Norwegian footballer
- George Gibson (Australian footballer) (1885–1933), Australian footballer for Essendon and Richmond

== Others ==
- George Gibson, Lewis and Clark Expedition member
- George Gibson (Commissary General) (1775–1861), United States Army's first Commissary General of Subsistence
- George Gibson (trade unionist) (1885–1953), British trade unionist and director of the Bank of England
- George Ernest Gibson (1884–1959), Scottish born American nuclear chemist
- George Gibson Coote (1880–1959), Canadian politician
- George Stacey Gibson (1818–1883), British businessman
- George Alexander Gibson (1853–1913), Scottish physician
- George Gibson (mathematician) (1858–1930), Scottish mathematician and academic author
