= 1977 Western Suburbs SC (NSW) season =

Western Suburbs
1977 season
- Head Coach: Michael Laing
- Stadium: Sydney Sports Ground; Englefield Stadium; Marconi Oval
- National Soccer League: 5th
- NSL Cup: Quarter-finals
- Top goalscorer: League: Graham Norris (9); All: Graham Norris (9)
- Highest home attendance: 7,253 vs. Sydney Olympic (8 May 1977); National Soccer League
- Lowest home attendance: 521 vs. Brisbane City (28 August 1977); National Soccer League
- Average home league attendance: 1,743
- Biggest win: 5–0 vs. Mooroolbark (H) (3 April 1977); National Soccer League
- Biggest defeat: 0–4 vs. Brisbane Lions (A) (24 July 1977); National Soccer League

The 1977 season was the first in the National Soccer League for Western Suburbs Soccer Club. In addition to the domestic league, they also participated in the NSL Cup. Western Suburbs finished 5th in their National Soccer League season, and were eliminated in the quarter-finals of the NSL Cup.

== Players ==
Note: Flags indicate national team as defined under FIFA eligibility rules; some limited exceptions apply. Players may hold more than one non-FIFA nationality.

No.	Pos.	Nation	Player
1	GK	ENG	Terry Eaton
2	DF	AUS	Colin Curran
3	DF	AUS	Steve Perry
4	DF	ENG	Bob Noble
5	DF	AUS	Peter Wilson
6	MF	AUS	Dave Harding
7		ENG	Bob Fryer
8	MF	AUS	Peter Stone
9	FW	RSA	Graham Norris
10	FW	AUS	Clive Eaton
11	MF	AUS	Alan Ainslie
12		AUS	Ian Turnbull

No.	Pos.	Nation	Player
13	MF	AUS	Lloyd Hardes
20	GK	POL	Wally Lachowicz
—	DF	ENG	Mike Berry
—		AUS	Brian Dodd
—	FW	AUS	Alan Fisher
—	FW	AUS	Ken Lindsay
—		ENG	Pat Lowrey
—	FW	ENG	Ian Moores
—	DF	AUS	Ian Rowden
—		AUS	Mark Samuels
—		AUS	Warren Turnbull

=== Transfers in ===
Date from	Position	Name	From	Fee	Ref.
26 January 1977	DF	(England) Mike Berry	(England) Southampton	Free transfer	
26 January 1977	FW	(South Africa) Graham Norris	(England) Crystal Palace	Free transfer	

== Competitions ==
=== Overall record ===
Competition	First match	Last match	Starting round	Final position	Record							
Competition	First match	Last match	Starting round	Final position	Pld	W	D	L	GF	GA	GD	Win %
National Soccer League	3 April 1977	25 September 1977	Matchday 1	5th	26	11	7	8	38	29	+9	42.31
NSL Cup	20 September 1977	2 October 1977	First round	Quarter-finals	2	1	1	0	3	2	+1	50.00
Total					28	12	8	8	41	31	+10	42.86

Source: Competitions

=== National Soccer League ===
==== League table ====
Pos	Team	Pld	W	D	L	GF	GA	GD	Pts
3	Fitzroy United	26	12	8	6	41	34	+7	32
4	Adelaide City	26	12	7	7	50	31	+19	31
5	Western Suburbs	26	11	7	8	38	29	+9	29
6	St George-Budapest	26	7	14	5	39	35	+4	28
7	West Adelaide	26	8	10	8	38	32	+6	26

Source: rsssf.com
Rules for classification: 1) Points; 2) Goal difference; 3) Goals scored

==== Results summary ====
Overall								Home						Away					
Pld	W	D	L	GF	GA	GD	Pts	W	D	L	GF	GA	GD	W	D	L	GF	GA	GD
26	11	7	8	38	29	+9	40	5	5	3	21	12	+9	6	2	5	17	17	0

Source: worldfootball.net

==== Results by round ====
Round	1	2	3	4	5	6	7	8	9	10	11	12	13	14	15	16	17	18	19	20	21	22	23	24	25	26
Ground	H	A	H	A	A	H	A	H	A	H	A	H	A	H	A	H	A	H	A	H	A	H	A	H	A	H
Result	W	W	W	W	W	L	D	D	W	D	D	L	L	D	W	W	L	D	W	L	L	D	L	W	L	W
Position	1	1	1	1	1	1	2	2	1	1	1	4	4	4	4	4	4	4	4	3	5	5	5	5	5	5
Points	2	4	6	8	10	10	11	12	14	15	16	16	16	17	19	21	21	22	24	24	24	25	25	27	27	29

Source: worldfootball.net
A = Away; H = Home; W = Win; D = Draw; L = Loss

==== Matches ====
Win Draw Loss

3 April 1977 1	Western Suburbs	5–0	Mooroolbark	Sydney
	Lindsay 8'; Fryer 46'; Harding 61'; Eaton 68'; Norris 74'	Report		Stadium: Sydney Sports Ground; Attendance: 1,000; Referee: Peter Rampley

11 April 1977 2	West Adelaide	0–1	Western Suburbs	Adelaide
		Report	Norris 45'	Stadium: Hindmarsh Stadium; Attendance: 7,128; Referee: Dennis Stanley

17 April 1977 3	Western Suburbs	3–0	Brisbane Lions	Sydney
	Perry 23'; Wilson 41'; Harding 71'	Report		Stadium: Sydney Sports Ground; Attendance: 1,037; Referee: Richard Lorenc

23 April 1977 4	Canberra City	0–3	Western Suburbs	Canberra
		Report	Norris 24', 86'; Fryer 36'	Stadium: Manuka Oval; Attendance: 2,000; Referee: Peter Rampley

1 May 1977 5	Adelaide City	1–2	Western Suburbs	Adelaide
	Melta 53'	Report	Norris 32', 8'	Stadium: Olympic Sports Field; Attendance: 11,300; Referee: Dennis Stanley

8 May 1977 6	Western Suburbs	0–2	Sydney Olympic	Sydney
		Report	Cross 15'; Pirie 34'	Stadium: Sydney Sports Ground; Attendance: 7,253; Referee: Bob Mee

14 May 1977 7	Fitzroy United	2–2	Western Suburbs	Melbourne
	Buljevic 9'; Cole 59'	Report	Lowrey 75'; Norris 81'	Stadium: Middle Park Soccer Stadium; Attendance: 5,800; Referee: Jim Dixon

21 May 1977 8	Western Suburbs	0–0	Footscray JUST	Sydney
		Report		Stadium: Sydney Sports Ground; Attendance: 1,754; Referee: Tim Davies

29 May 1977 9	Brisbane City	0–1	Western Suburbs	Brisbane
		Report	Moores 10'	Stadium: Perry Park; Attendance: 5,103; Referee: Dave Nugent

1 June 1977 10	Western Suburbs	1–1	Marconi Fairfield	Sydney
	Eaton 86'	Report	Rooney 70'	Stadium: Englefield Stadium; Attendance: 3,245; Referee: Ken Small

11 June 1977 11	St George-Budapest	1–1	Western Suburbs	Sydney
	Jankovics 86'	Report	Moores 8'	Stadium: Sydney Sports Ground; Attendance: 2,763; Referee: Richard Lorenc

18 June 1977 12	Western Suburbs	3–4	Eastern Suburbs	Sydney
	Wilson 11'; Ainslie 53'; Fryer 86'	Report	Kershaw 10', 63'; Barnes 50', 55'	Stadium: Sydney Sports Ground; Attendance: 1,275; Referee: Barry Wilkinson

26 June 1977 13	South Melbourne	2–0	Western Suburbs	Melbourne
	Gibson 58'; Rogers 87'	Report		Stadium: Middle Park Soccer Stadium; Attendance: 5,000; Referee: Bob Henderson

3 July 1977 14	Western Suburbs	1–1	West Adelaide	Sydney
	Ainslie 64'	Report	McCulloch 45'	Stadium: Englefield Stadium; Attendance: 1,347; Referee: Tony Boskovic

10 July 1977 15	Mooroolbark	0–2	Western Suburbs	Melbourne
		Report	Stone 65'; Ainslie 87' (pen.)	Stadium: Middle Park Soccer Stadium; Attendance: 5,200; Referee: Nick Karlich

17 July 1977 16	Western Suburbs	3–1	Canberra City	Sydney
	Eaton 2', 59'; Curran 86'	Report	Kawaleva 31'	Stadium: Englefield Stadium; Attendance: 1,012; Referee: Bill Jones

24 July 1977 17	Brisbane Lions	4–0	Western Suburbs	Brisbane
	Murray 28', 75', 90'; Laszlo 50'	Report		Stadium: Perry Park; Attendance: 4,326; Referee: Dave Nugent

31 July 1977 18	Western Suburbs	0–0	Adelaide City	Sydney
		Report		Stadium: Englefield Stadium; Attendance: 1,796; Referee: Tony Boskovic

7 August 1977 19	Sydney Olympic	0–3	Western Suburbs	Sydney
		Report	Curran 13'; Eaton 62', 83'	Stadium: Sydney Sports Ground; Attendance: 2,960; Referee: Richard Lorenc

31 August 1977 20	Western Suburbs	0–1	Fitzroy United	Sydney
		Report	Buljevic 61'	Stadium: Englefield Stadium; Attendance: 1,109; Referee: Peter Rampley

20 August 1977 21	Footscray JUST	2–1	Western Suburbs	Melbourne
	Palinkas 21'; Picioane 77'	Report	Noble 69'	Stadium: Middle Park Soccer Stadium; Attendance: 1,100; Referee: Chris Bambridge

28 August 1977 22	Western Suburbs	0–0	Brisbane City	Sydney
		Report		Stadium: Englefield Stadium; Attendance: 521; Referee: Henry Witschge

4 September 1977 23	Marconi Fairfield	3–0	Western Suburbs	Sydney
	Sharne 37'; Mariani 45', 71'	Report		Stadium: Marconi Oval; Attendance: 2,358; Referee: Tony Boskovic

11 September 1977 24	Western Suburbs	3–2	St George-Budapest	Sydney
	Norris 6'; C. Eaton 18'; Harding 45'	Report	Hamilton 56', 73'	Stadium: Englefield Stadium; Attendance: 780; Referee: Barry Wilkinson

18 September 1977 25	Eastern Suburbs	2–1	Western Suburbs	Sydney
	Smith 55'; Stevenson 83' (pen.)	Report	Norris 49'	Stadium: Wentworth Park; Attendance: 1,278; Referee: Don Campbell

25 September 1977 26	Western Suburbs	2–0	South Melbourne	Sydney
	Wilson 53'; Manley 76' (o.g.)	Report		Stadium: Englefield Stadium; Attendance: 526; Referee: Henry Witschge

=== NSL Cup ===
Win Draw Loss

20 September 1977 First round	Western Suburbs	2–1	Sydney Olympic	Sydney
	Turnbull 31', 78'	Report	Jamieson 86'	Stadium: Marconi Oval; Attendance: 2,237; Referee: Tim Davies

2 October 1977 Quarter-finals	Brisbane City	1–1 (a.e.t.) (5–4 p)	Western Suburbs	Brisbane
	Johnston 5'	Report	Harding 55'	Stadium: Perry Park; Attendance: 4,000; Referee: David Yelland

== Statistics ==
=== Appearances and goals ===
Includes all competitions. Players with no appearances not included in the list.

No.	Pos.	Nat.	Player	National Soccer League		NSL Cup		Total	
No.	Pos.	Nat.	Player	Apps	Goals	Apps	Goals	Apps	Goals
1	GK	(England)	Terry Eaton	26	0	1	0	27	0
2	DF	(Australia)	Colin Curran	26	2	2	0	28	2
3	DF	(Australia)	Steve Perry	25+1	1	2	0	28	1
4	DF	(England)	Bob Noble	22	1	2	0	24	1
5	DF	(Australia)	Peter Wilson	25	3	2	0	27	3
6	MF	(Australia)	Dave Harding	25	3	2	1	27	4
7	—	(England)	Bob Fryer	13	3	0	0	13	3
8	MF	(Australia)	Peter Stone	25	1	2	0	27	1
9	FW	(South Africa)	Graham Norris	21	9	2	0	23	9
10	FW	(Australia)	Clive Eaton	23+1	7	1	0	25	7
11	MF	(Australia)	Alan Ainslie	20+1	3	2	0	23	3
12	—	(Australia)	Ian Turnbull	9+2	0	1	0	12	0
13	MF	(Australia)	Lloyd Hardes	9+1	0	0+1	0	11	0
20	GK	(Poland)	Wally Lachowicz	0	0	1	0	1	0
—	DF	(England)	Mike Berry	0+1	0	0	0	1	0
—	—	(Australia)	Brian Dodd	1+4	0	0	0	5	0
—	FW	(Australia)	Alan Fisher	2+1	0	1	0	4	0
—	FW	(Australia)	Ken Lindsay	6	1	0	0	6	1
—	—	(England)	Pat Lowrey	3+3	1	0	0	6	1
—	FW	(England)	Ian Moores	5	2	0	0	5	2
—	DF	(Australia)	Ian Rowden	0+1	0	0	0	1	0
—	—	(Australia)	Mark Samuels	0+1	0	0	0	1	0
—	—	(Australia)	Warren Turnbull	0	0	1	2	1	2

=== Disciplinary record ===
Includes all competitions. The list is sorted by squad number when total cards are equal. Players with no cards not included in the list.

Rank	No.	Pos.	Nat.	Player	National Soccer League			NSL Cup			Total		
Rank	No.	Pos.	Nat.	Player	Yellow card	Second yellow card	Red card	Yellow card	Second yellow card	Red card	Yellow card	Second yellow card	Red card
1	9	FW	(South Africa)	Graham Norris	3	0	2	0	0	0	3	0	2
2	4	DF	(England)	Bob Noble	6	0	0	0	0	0	6	0	0
3	1	GK	(England)	Terry Eaton	2	0	0	0	0	0	2	0	0
4	3	DF	(Australia)	Steve Perry	1	0	0	0	0	0	1	0	0
4	5	DF	(Australia)	Peter Wilson	1	0	0	0	0	0	1	0	0
4	6	MF	(Australia)	Dave Harding	1	0	0	0	0	0	1	0	0
4	7	—	(England)	Bob Fryer	1	0	0	0	0	0	1	0	0
4	8	MF	(Australia)	Peter Stone	1	0	0	0	0	0	1	0	0
Total					16	0	2	0	0	0	16	0	2

=== Clean sheets ===
Includes all competitions. The list is sorted by squad number when total clean sheets are equal. Numbers in parentheses represent games where both goalkeepers participated and both kept a clean sheet; the number in parentheses is awarded to the goalkeeper who was substituted on, whilst a full clean sheet is awarded to the goalkeeper who was on the field at the start of play. Goalkeepers with no clean sheets not included in the list.

Rank	No.	Nat.	Goalkeeper	NSL	NSL Cup	Total
1	1	(England)	Terry Eaton	11	0	11
Total				11	0	11
