= 1978 Western Suburbs SC (NSW) season =

Western Suburbs
1978 season
- Head Coach: Michael Laing
- Stadium: Englefield Stadium; Marconi Oval; Wentworth Park
- National Soccer League: 9th
- NSL Cup: Quarter-finals
- Top goalscorer: League: Clive Eaton (14); All: Clive Eaton (16)
- Highest home attendance: 5,928 vs. St George-Budapest (28 May 1978); National Soccer League
- Lowest home attendance: 500 vs. Brisbane City (9 April 1978); National Soccer League
- Average home league attendance: 2,450
- Biggest win: 3–0 vs. Fitzroy United (A) (26 March 1978); National Soccer League; 3–0 vs. South Melbourne (H) (6 August 1979); National Soccer League
- Biggest defeat: 2–6 vs. Marconi Fairfield (A) (16 April 1978); National Soccer League

The 1978 season was the second and final season in the National Soccer League for Western Suburbs Soccer Club. In addition to the domestic league, they also participated in the NSL Cup. Western Suburbs finished 9th in their National Soccer League season, and were eliminated in the quarter-finals of the NSL Cup.

== Players ==
Note: Flags indicate national team as defined under FIFA eligibility rules; some limited exceptions apply. Players may hold more than one non-FIFA nationality.

No.	Pos.	Nation	Player
1	GK	POL	Wally Lachowicz
2	DF	AUS	Rod Skellern
3		AUS	Warren Turnbull
4	DF	ENG	Bob Noble
5	DF	AUS	Peter Wilson (captain)
6	MF	AUS	Dave Harding
7	MF	AUS	Peter Stone
8	MF	AUS	Brian O'Donnell
9	FW	AUS	Andy Scott
10	FW	AUS	Clive Eaton
11		AUS	John Vernon

No.	Pos.	Nation	Player
12	DF	AUS	Ian Rowden
13	FW	AUS	Alan Fisher
20	GK	AUS	Greg Woodhouse
—	DF	AUS	Greg Ankudinoff
—	DF	AUS	Barry Campbell
—		AUS	Mark Davies
—		AUS	Brian Dodd
—		AUS	Rob Drewes
—	GK	ENG	Terry Eaton
—		AUS	Mark Samuels

== Competitions ==
=== Overall record ===
Competition	First match	Last match	Starting round	Final position	Record							
Competition	First match	Last match	Starting round	Final position	Pld	W	D	L	GF	GA	GD	Win %
National Soccer League	5 March 1978	27 August 1978	Matchday 1	9th	26	9	6	11	41	45	−4	34.62
NSL Cup	24 May 1978	3 September 1978	First round	Quarter-finals	3	2	0	1	3	1	+2	66.67
Total					29	11	6	12	44	46	−2	37.93

Source: Competitions

=== National Soccer League ===
==== League table ====
Pos	Team	Pld	W	D	L	GF	GA	GD	Pts
7	St George-Budapest	26	11	3	12	41	40	+1	25
8	Sydney Olympic	26	9	7	10	35	43	−8	25
9	Western Suburbs	26	9	6	11	41	45	−4	24
10	Adelaide City	26	9	6	11	38	44	−6	24
11	Newcastle KB United	26	6	10	10	33	40	−7	22

Source: rsssf.com
Rules for classification: 1) Points; 2) Goal difference; 3) Goals scored

==== Results summary ====
Overall								Home						Away					
Pld	W	D	L	GF	GA	GD	Pts	W	D	L	GF	GA	GD	W	D	L	GF	GA	GD
26	9	6	11	41	45	−4	33	6	4	3	25	18	+7	3	2	8	16	27	−11

Source: worldfootball.net

==== Results by round ====
Round	1	2	4	3	5	6	7	8	9	10	11	12	13	14	15	16	17	18	19	20	21	22	23	24	25	26
Ground	A	H	A	H	H	H	A	H	A	A	H	A	H	A	H	A	H	A	A	H	A	H	H	A	H	A
Result	W	D	W	D	D	W	L	W	L	L	L	D	W	L	D	L	L	W	D	W	L	L	W	L	W	L
Position	4	3	3	6	4	3	3	2	2	3	6	6	6	7	7	8	9	8	8	7	7	8	7	9	8	9
Points	2	3	5	6	7	9	9	11	11	11	11	12	14	14	15	15	15	17	18	20	20	20	22	22	24	24

Source: worldfootball.net
A = Away; H = Home; W = Win; D = Draw; L = Loss

==== Matches ====
Win Draw Loss

5 March 1978 1	Sydney Olympic	0–1	Western Suburbs	Sydney
		Report	Fisher 75'	Stadium: Arlington Oval; Attendance: 4,124; Referee: Jim Reeves

12 March 1978 2	Western Suburbs	1–1	Newcastle KB United	Sydney
	C. Eaton 70'	Report	Curran 42'	Stadium: Englefield Stadium; Attendance: 1,053; Referee: Dennis McDermott

26 March 1978 4	Fitzroy United	0–3	Western Suburbs	Melbourne
		Report	Fisher 21'; C. Eaton 25', 47'	Stadium: Schintler Reserve; Attendance: 3,500; Referee: Tony Beazleigh

27 March 1978 3	Western Suburbs	2–2	Brisbane Lions	Sydney
	Fisher 18'; Samuels 78'	Report	Morris 5'; Neale 20'	Stadium: Englefield Stadium; Attendance: 1,000; Referee: Barry Wilkinson

2 April 1978 5	Western Suburbs	0–0	Footscray JUST	Sydney
		Report		Stadium: Englefield Stadium; Attendance: 1,023; Referee: Tony Boskovic

9 April 1978 6	Western Suburbs	3–1	Brisbane City	Sydney
	C. Eaton 37'; Scott 57'; Perry 67' (o.g.)	Report	Conner 17'	Stadium: Englefield Stadium; Attendance: 500; Referee: Richard Lorenc

16 April 1978 7	Marconi Fairfield	6–2	Western Suburbs	Sydney
15:00 AEST	Vieri 9' (pen.), 71', 76' (pen.); Rooney 11'; Jankovics 63'; Mariani 70'	Report	Harding 15'; C. Eaton 16'	Stadium: Marconi Oval; Attendance: 5,719; Referee: Doug Rennie

23 April 1978 8	Western Suburbs	3–2	Eastern Suburbs	Sydney
	Harding 35'; C. Eaton 43'; Fisher 51'	Report	Campbell 78'; Silva 86'	Stadium: Marconi Oval; Attendance: 2,476; Referee: Henry Witschge

30 April 1978 9	Adelaide City	4–2	Western Suburbs	Adelaide
	Kolecki 3', 75'; J. Nyskohus 40'; Perin 66'	Report	Fisher 62'	Stadium: Olympic Sports Field; Attendance: 5,500; Referee: Don Campbell

6 May 1978 10	South Melbourne	2–1	Western Suburbs	Melbourne
	Ollerton 6', 24'	Report	Vernon 2'	Stadium: Middle Park Soccer Stadium; Attendance: 4,000; Referee: Jim Dixon

14 May 1978 11	Western Suburbs	1–2	West Adelaide	Sydney
	Harding 37'	Report	McGregor 50'; Honeyman 70'	Stadium: Wentworth Park; Attendance: 2,685; Referee: Tim Davies

20 May 1978 12	Canberra City	2–2	Western Suburbs	Canberra
	Grujicic 64', 82' (pen.)	Report	Fisher 22'; O'Donnell 90+1'	Stadium: Bruce Stadium; Attendance: 5,000; Referee: David Yelland

28 May 1978 13	Western Suburbs	2–1	St George-Budapest	Sydney
	Vernon 51', 77'	Report	Morgan 55'	Stadium: Wentworth Park; Attendance: 5,928; Referee: Richard Lorenc

3 June 1978 14	Newcastle KB United	2–1	Western Suburbs	Newcastle
14:30 AEST	Mountford 37'; Drinkwater 80'	Report	Scott 72'	Stadium: Newcastle International Sports Centre; Attendance: 6,789; Referee: Peter Rampley

11 June 1978 15	Western Suburbs	2–2	Sydney Olympic	Sydney
	Stone 51'; Eaton 78'	Report	Pirie 21'; Jamieson 23'	Stadium: Wentworth Park; Attendance: 4,725

18 June 1978 16	Brisbane Lions	3–1	Western Suburbs	Brisbane
	Hughes 69'; Amos 74'; Fairbrother 77'	Report	Fisher 89'	Stadium: Perry Park; Attendance: 2,300; Referee: Jack Wood

25 June 1978 17	Western Suburbs	2–3	Fitzroy United	Sydney
	Turnbull 63'; Eaton 79'	Report	Campbell 49'; Bozikas 55'; Buljevic 65'	Stadium: Wentworth Park; Attendance: 2,458; Referee: Henry Witschge

1 July 1978 18	Footscray JUST	2–3	Western Suburbs	Melbourne
	Palinkas 20'; Lujic 55'	Report	Turnbull 63'; Eaton 68'; Fisher 72'	Stadium: Middle Park Soccer Stadium; Attendance: 1,000; Referee: Stewart Mellings

9 July 1978 19	Brisbane City	0–0	Western Suburbs	Brisbane
		Report		Stadium: Perry Park; Attendance: 2,300; Referee: Dave Nugent

16 July 1978 20	Western Suburbs	3–1	Marconi Fairfield	Sydney
	Fisher 23', 40'; Vernon 85'	Report	Vieri 41' (pen.)	Stadium: Wentworth Park; Attendance: 2,126; Referee: Tim Davies

23 July 1978 21	Eastern Suburbs	3–0	Western Suburbs	Sydney
	Souness 41'; Campbell 52'; Silva 80'	Report		Stadium: Wentworth Park; Attendance: 1,113; Referee: Richard Lorenc

30 July 1978 22	Western Suburbs	2–3	Adelaide City	Sydney
	SCott 66'; Harding 86' (pen.)	Report	Perin 41' (pen.); J. Nyskohus 58'; Deans 90'	Stadium: Wentworth Park; Attendance: 1,023; Referee: Peter Rampley

6 August 1979 23	Western Suburbs	3–0	South Melbourne	Sydney
	Eaton 4', 36', 60'	Report		Stadium: Wentworth Park; Attendance: 4,102; Referee: Tony Boskovic

13 August 1978 24	West Adelaide	2–0	Western Suburbs	Adelaide
	Norris 42'; Boyle 61'	Report		Stadium: Hindmarsh Stadium; Attendance: 4,321; Referee: Jim Johnston

20 August 1978 25	Western Suburbs	1–0	Canberra City	Sydney
	Stone 80'	Report		Stadium: Wentworth Park; Attendance: 2,747; Referee: Barry Wilkinson

27 August 1978 26	St George-Budapest	1–0	Western Suburbs	Sydney
	Utjesenovic 16'	Report		Stadium: St George Stadium; Attendance: 1,025; Referee: Bill Jones

=== NSL Cup ===
Win Draw Loss

24 May 1978 First round	Western Suburbs	2–0	(New South Wales) Sutherland	Sydney
	C. Eaton 20'; Sharne 32'	Report		Stadium: Garside Park; Attendance:

19 July 1978 Second round	Western Suburbs	1–0	St George-Budapest	Sydney
	C. Eaton 4'	Report		Stadium: Wentworth Park; Attendance: 1,023; Referee: Henry Witschge

3 September 1978 Quarter-finals	Newcastle KB United	1–0	Western Suburbs	Newcastle
	Tredinnick 86'	Report		Stadium: Newcastle International Sports Centre; Attendance: 6,417; Referee: Jack Wood

== Statistics ==
=== Appearances and goals ===
Includes all competitions. Players with no appearances not included in the list.

No.	Pos.	Nat.	Player	National Soccer League		NSL Cup		Total	
No.	Pos.	Nat.	Player	Apps	Goals	Apps	Goals	Apps	Goals
1	GK	(Poland)	Wally Lachowicz	7	0	1	0	8	0
2	DF	(Australia)	Rod Skellern	24+1	0	3	0	28	0
3	—	(Australia)	Warren Turnbull	26	2	3	0	29	2
4	DF	(England)	Bob Noble	10	0	0	0	10	0
5	DF	(Australia)	Peter Wilson	21	0	2	0	23	0
6	MF	(Australia)	Dave Harding	26	4	3	0	29	4
7	MF	(Australia)	Peter Stone	25	2	3	1	28	3
8	MF	(Australia)	Brian O'Donnell	26	1	2	0	28	1
9	FW	(Australia)	Andy Scott	14+2	3	2+1	0	19	3
10	FW	(Australia)	Clive Eaton	26	14	3	2	29	16
11	—	(Australia)	John Vernon	13+5	4	3	0	21	4
12	DF	(Australia)	Ian Rowden	16+3	0	3	0	22	0
13	FW	(Australia)	Alan Fisher	17+4	9	1	0	22	9
20	GK	(Australia)	Greg Woodhouse	9+1	0	1	0	11	0
—	DF	(Australia)	Greg Ankudinoff	3	0	0	0	3	0
—	DF	(Australia)	Barry Campbell	4	0	1	0	5	0
—	—	(Australia)	Mark Davies	0+1	0	0	0	1	0
—	—	(Australia)	Brian Dodd	5	0	0	0	5	0
—	—	(Australia)	Rob Drewes	2	0	1	0	3	0
—	GK	(England)	Terry Eaton	10	0	1	0	11	0
—	—	(Australia)	Mark Samuels	2+7	1	0+1	0	10	1

=== Disciplinary record ===
Includes all competitions. The list is sorted by squad number when total cards are equal. Players with no cards not included in the list.

Rank	No.	Pos.	Nat.	Player	National Soccer League			NSL Cup			Total		
Rank	No.	Pos.	Nat.	Player	Yellow card	Second yellow card	Red card	Yellow card	Second yellow card	Red card	Yellow card	Second yellow card	Red card
1	9	FW	(Australia)	Andy Scott	1	0	1	0	0	0	1	0	1
2	8	MF	(Australia)	Brian O'Donnell	5	0	0	0	0	0	5	0	0
3	4	DF	(England)	Bob Noble	3	0	0	0	0	0	3	0	0
3	10	FW	(Australia)	Clive Eaton	3	0	0	0	0	0	3	0	0
5	3	—	(Australia)	Warren Turnbull	2	0	0	0	0	0	2	0	0
5	6	MF	(Australia)	Dave Harding	2	0	0	0	0	0	2	0	0
5	13	FW	(Australia)	Alan Fisher	2	0	0	0	0	0	2	0	0
8	5	DF	(Australia)	Peter Wilson	1	0	0	0	0	0	1	0	0
8	11	—	(Australia)	John Vernon	1	0	0	0	0	0	1	0	0
8	12	DF	(Australia)	Ian Rowden	1	0	0	0	0	0	1	0	0
8	—	GK	(England)	Terry Eaton	1	0	0	0	0	0	1	0	0
Total					22	0	1	0	0	0	22	0	1

=== Clean sheets ===
Includes all competitions. The list is sorted by squad number when total clean sheets are equal. Numbers in parentheses represent games where both goalkeepers participated and both kept a clean sheet; the number in parentheses is awarded to the goalkeeper who was substituted on, whilst a full clean sheet is awarded to the goalkeeper who was on the field at the start of play. Goalkeepers with no clean sheets not included in the list.

Rank	No.	Nat.	Goalkeeper	NSL	NSL Cup	Total
1	—	(England)	Terry Eaton	4	0	4
2	20	(Australia)	Greg Woodhouse	2	1	3
3	1	(Poland)	Wally Lachowicz	0	1	1
Total				6	2	8
