= List of Western Suburbs SC (NSW) seasons =

Western Suburbs Soccer Club was an Australian semi-professional association football club based in Sydney. The club was formed in 1964 and became one of 14 founding members of the National Soccer League in 1977 after spending their first 13 seasons in the New South Wales football tiers.

The club's first team spent two seasons in the National Soccer League, six in the top division of New South Wales, four in the second and three in the lower tiers of New South Wales football. Their worst league finish was 10th in the inter-suburban second tier, their placing at the end of the 1965 season. The table details the club's achievements in major competitions, and the top scorers for each season.

== History ==
Western Suburbs' first team started competitive football in the 1964 season in NSW Amateur Division B (the fourth tier of New South Wales football) finishing 7th as the league disbanded at the end of the season and was moved to the NSW Inter Suburban Division Two the following season in 1965 where the team was relegated to NSW Inter Suburban Division Three, but was promoted to the NSW Federation Division Two in 1966. The next four seasons were played in the second tier until they were promoted to the first tier in 1970 winning the club's first competitive honour.

When they entered the NSW Ampol Cup, their first Ampol Cup was won in 1971 winning 4–2 against Marconi-Fairfield in the Final. while also entering their first State Cup the same season. Their final competitive honour came in the 1976 NSW Ampol Cup as the following season had the team enter Australia's first national competitive season in the National Soccer League in 1977 where the team finished 5th out 14 which had the next season play their last season as club in 1978 finishing 9th and qualifying for the Quarter-Finals of the 1978 NSL Cup.

== Key ==
Key to league competitions:

- National Soccer League (NSL) – Australia's former top football league, established in 1977 and dissolved in 2004.
- NSW Federation Division One (Div 1) – The first tier of football in New South Wales.
- NSW Federation Division Two (Div 2) – The second tier of football in New South Wales.
- NSW Inter Suburban Division Two (Inter Div 2)
- NSW Inter Suburban Division Three (Inter Div 3)
- NSW Amateur Division B (Amateur B)

Key to colours and symbols:

1st or W	Winners
2nd or RU	Runners-up
3rd	Third place
↑	Promoted
↓	Relegated
♦	Top scorer in division

Key to league record:

- Season = The year and article of the season
- Pos = Final position
- Pld = Matches played
- W = Matches won
- D = Matches drawn
- L = Matches lost
- GF = Goals scored
- GA = Goals against
- Pts = Points

Key to cup record:

- En-dash (–) = Western Suburbs did not participate
- R1 = First round
- R2 = Second round, etc.
- QF = Quarter-finals
- SF = Semi-finals
- RU = Runners-up
- W = Winners

== Seasons ==
Results of league and cup competitions by season
Season	Division	Pld	W	D	L	GF	GA	Pts	Pos	Finals	Cup	Competition	Result	Name(s)	Goals
Season	League									Finals	Cup	Other		Top goalscorer(s)	
1964	Amateur B	22	10	2	10	62	81	22	7th	—	—	—	—		
1965	Inter Div 2 ↓	18	3	2	13	33	69	8	10th	—	—	—	—		
1966	Inter Div 3 ↑	18	9	4	5	45	37	22	3rd	—	—	—	—		
1967	Div 2	22	11	4	7	45	34	26	6th	—	—	—	—		
1968	Div 2	22	17	1	4	64	28	35	2nd	RU	—	—	—		
1969	Div 2	22	13	5	4	66	19	31	3rd	RU	—	—	—		
1970	Div 2 ↑	22	17	3	2	57	17	37	1st	—	—	—	—		
1971	Div 1	22	13	4	5	42	27	30	3rd	RU	R4	Ampol Cup	W		
1972	Div 1	22	4	8	10	27	34	16	9th	DNQ	SF	Ampol Cup	SF		
1973	Div 1	22	11	4	7	39	23	26	4th	SF	—	—	—		
1974	Div 1	22	11	6	5	31	19	28	4th	Minor SF	SF	—	—		
1975	Div 1	22	7	7	8	24	23	21	8th	DNQ	RU	—	—		
1976	Div 1	22	8	2	12	33	38	18	9th	DNQ	R8	Ampol Cup	W		
1977	NSL	26	11	7	8	38	29	29	5th	—	QF	—	—	Graham Norris	9
1978	NSL	26	9	6	11	41	45	24	9th	DNQ	QF	—	—	Clive Eaton	16
