= Menaker =

Menaker is a surname of European Jewish origin; it is an "occupational surname" relating to Nikkur, sometimes part of the kashering process. Notable people with the surname include:

- Daniel Menaker (1941–2020), American writer, son of Robert
- Elise Menaker (born 1987), American sportscaster, sideline reporter, former softball player,
- Michael Menaker (1934–2021), American biologist
- Robert Menaker (1904–1988), American Soviet spy
- Andrei Mironov (1941–1987), born Andrei Menaker, Soviet/Russian actor
- Will Menaker, American podcaster, son of Daniel
