= Walter Seabrook =

English cricketer

Personal information
- Full name: Walter George Seabrook
- Born: 12 February 1904; Brockworth, Gloucestershire, England
- Died: 13 June 1988 (aged 84); Bourne End, Buckinghamshire, England
- Batting: Left-handed
- Bowling: Left-arm fast-medium
- Relatives: Frederick Seabrook (brother); Archibald Spens (brother-in-law)

Domestic team information
- Years: Team
- 1928: Gloucestershire

Career statistics
Competition	First-class
Matches	1
Runs scored	0
Batting average	0.00
100s/50s	–/–
Top score	0
Balls bowled	12
Wickets	–
Bowling average	–
5 wickets in innings	–
10 wickets in match	–
Best bowling	–
Catches/stumpings	–/–
- Source: Cricinfo, 31 July 2011

Walter George Seabrook (12 February 1904 – 13 June 1988) was an English cricketer. Seabrook was a left-handed batsman who bowled left-arm fast-medium. He was born in Brockworth, Gloucestershire and was educated at Haileybury, where he represented the college cricket team.

Seabrook made his only first-class appearance for Gloucestershire against Kent in the 1928 County Championship. In this match he was dismissed for a duck twice, while with the ball he bowled 2 wicket-less overs. The following year he married Margaret Joan Spens, the couple would go on to have three children. Seabrook later served in World War II, by December 1944 he held the rank of 2nd Lieutenant in the Gloucestershire Regiment. On 30 May 1945, Seabrook relinquished his commission and left the army. He later died in Bourne End, Buckinghamshire on 13 June 1988.

His brother-in-law, Archibald Spens, played a single first-class match for the Europeans in the British Raj, while his brother, Frederick, played first-class cricket for Gloucestershire and Cambridge University.
