= Robert Menaker =

American exporter who allegedly worked for Soviet intelligence during World War II

- Born: Robert Owen Menaker; June 25, 1904; Passaic, New Jersey, U.S.
- Died: September 1, 1988 (aged 84); Nyack, New York, U.S.
- Occupation: Exporter
- Known for: Allegedly spying for the Soviet Union
- Spouse: Mary Grace
- Children: 2, including Daniel

Robert Owen Menaker (June 25, 1904 – September 1, 1988) was an American exporter who allegedly worked for Soviet intelligence during World War II.

== Biography ==
Born in Passaic, New Jersey, Menaker was the son of a Russian Jewish immigrant who was imprisoned for revolutionary activity in Russia. His family were noted radicals; he was named for utopian socialist Robert Owen and one of his nieces, Ellen, was married to Victor Perlo, head of the Perlo group.

Menaker was identified by Arlington Hall cryptographers in sixteen Venona messages. Menaker assisted Floyd Miller's infiltration of the Socialist Workers Party. Several Venona messages are related to Menaker's employer, Michael Burd, for whom Menaker worked at the Midland Export Corporation of New York City. In 1944 and 1945, Menaker traveled to Chile to represent Midland Export. While in Chile he met the Chilean diplomat Christian Casanova Subercaseaux. Burd and Subercaseaux were also both Soviet intelligence agents.

After returning from his 1944 Chile trip, Burd complained to the New York KGB office that Menaker alienated several companies they did business with. KGB Officer Pavel Ivanovich Fedosimov reported to Moscow that "allowances should be made" working with Menaker since he had not been thoroughly trained or screened prior to assignment.

In a later Venona transcript, the KGB speculates about the possibility that Laurence Duggan, another source who had recently resigned from the U.S. State Department, might go to Chile in place of Menaker or do some unspecified work with him. A cable from October references work with Joseph Katz, owner of the Tempus Import Company in Manhattan, and one of the KGB's most active agents. The decrypt requests instructions regarding Menaker's salary, and noted someone would be paying him thirty thousand dollars but that he might not receive it for a year. Menaker, like his friend Floyd Miller, "apparently cooperated with the FBI to some extent in the 1950s....His son wrote of the frequent presence in the household in the 1950s of a friendly FBI agent, but his father never spoke about precisely what he did in Mexico, or what he told the FBI."

Menaker and his wife, Mary Grace Menaker, had two sons: author Daniel Menaker (1941–2020), and Michael Menaker (d. 1967). He is the grandfather of Chapo Trap House host Will Menaker.

Menaker moved from New York City to South Nyack, New York in 1952. He died at a hospital in Nyack on September 1, 1988, at the age of 84.

== Venona ==
Menaker, whose code names as deciphered by Arlington Hall cryptographers were BOB and CZECH, is referenced in the following Venona project decryptions:

- 55 KGB Moscow to New York, January 10, 1943
- 694 KGB New York to Moscow, May 15, 1943
- 1044 KGB New York to Moscow, July 2, 1943
- 1185 KGB New York to Moscow, July 21, 1943
- 1031 KGB New York to Moscow, July 24, 1944
- 1143–1144 KGB New York to Moscow, August 10, 1944
- 1313 KGB New York to Moscow, September 13, 1944
- 1337 KGB New York to Moscow, September 19, 1944
- 1430 KGB New York to Moscow, October 10, 1944
- 1470 KGB New York to Moscow, October 17, 1944
- 1512 KGB New York to Moscow, October 24, 1944
- 1522 KGB New York to Moscow, October 27, 1944
- 1613 KGB New York to Moscow, November 18, 1944
- 1637 KGB New York to Moscow, November 21, 1944
- 1716 KGB New York to Moscow, December 5, 1944
- 77 KGB New York to Moscow, January 17, 1945
