= Elizabeth Gardner (physicist) =

British theoretical physicist

- Born: 25 August 1957; Cheshire
- Died: 18 June 1988 (aged 30)
- Education: University of Edinburgh; University of Oxford
- Known for: Gardner transition
- Scientific career
- Fields: Theoretical physics
- Academic advisors: I.J.R. Aitchison

Elizabeth Gardner (25 August 1957 – 18 June 1988) was a British theoretical physicist. She is best known for her groundbreaking work on a phase transition known as the Gardner transition and on disordered networks.

== Early life and education ==
Gardner was born in Cheshire, UK. Both of her parents were chemical engineers. Gardner was interested in science from an early age. In 1975, she enrolled in University of Edinburgh to study mathematical physics. She graduated with first class honors, and was awarded the Tait Medal in 1979, Robert Schlapp Prize, and the Class medal.

Gardner completed her D.Phil. studies at Oxford under the supervision of I.J.R. Aitchison. Her thesis was in particle physics, and focused on non-Abelian gauge theories. Despite fulfilling requirements, Gardner did not formally graduate from Oxford.

== Career ==
Following her D.Phil., Gardner moved to the Saclay Nuclear Research Centre, where she spent two years, supported by a Royal Society Fellowship. She worked on a variety of topics in field theory and the theory of disordered systems, and began to work on spin glasses.

In 1984, Gardner returned to the University of Edinburgh. She was supported initially by the Science and Engineering Research Council (SERC) to work on particle physics, and later by the university itself to work on disordered systems and neural networks.

In 1985, Gardner published a paper titled "Spin glasses with p-spin interactions," in which she described a phase transition for the first time that is now known as the Gardner transition. At the Gardner transition, a glass becomes marginally stable. The Gardner transition has attracted significant recent attention, as new evidence for it has been discovered through simulations and calculations about jamming of hard spheres.

During the last part of her life, she had the opportunity to spend several months in Israel for a program about advances in Neural Networks, which was organized by Daniel Amit, Hanoch Gutfreund and Haim Sompolinsky. During that time, she started a fruitful collaboration with Annette Zippelius leading to a work on a diluted and asymmetric neural network model.

In 1988, Gardner published two consecutive papers, one with Bernard Derrida, on neural networks. It has received significant attention in recent years, and was recently celebrated as one of the 50 most influential papers published in the Journal of Physics A.

== Death ==
Gardner was diagnosed with cancer in 1986, and died in June 1988.

== Research ==
When in Saclay, she started working on problems of field theory defined on random lattices. This contribution allowed to bridge the gap between field theory and disordered systems techniques.

She contributed to many different topics in the field of disordered systems, ranging from localization phenomena to the effect of randomness on the critical behaviour of weakly disordered models up to stereological properties of these materials. Notably, she generalized techniques for a well-known spin-glass problem, that is the Sherrington–Kirkpatrick model, to systems with p-spin interactions and defined, together with Bernard Derrida, the Generalized Random Energy Model (GREM).

When working on the p-spin, she discovered that in the zero-temperature limit this model can undergo a transition, according to which the energy landscape splits into many sub-basins hierarchically organized. Such a transition, now called "Gardner transition" after her pioneering works, turns out to be particularly timely nowadays for the physics of glasses and marginal stability properties in the low-temperature phase.

The deep understanding of the modern ideas developed in the theory of spin glasses allowed her to go far beyond and to extensively contribute also in neural networks. A typical spin-glass example in this domain is the Hopfield model, for which she realized that a second kind of dynamics could take place (a retrieval dynamics).

== Awards and honours ==
- She was awarded the Tait Medal in 1979 by the University of Edinburgh.
- Her works on the optimal storage of neural networks have been selected as two of the most influential papers in the 50th anniversary of Journal of Physics A.
- Since 2023, the University of Edinburgh has organized annual Elizabeth Gardner Lectures focused on areas of research in which Gardner made foundational contributions.
