= William Englefield =

Australian cricketer (1917–1988)

Personal information
- Born: 6 October 1917; Sydney, Australia
- Died: 3 June 1988 (aged 70); Sydney, Australia
- Source: Cricinfo, 27 November 2018

William Englefield (6 October 1917 – 3 June 1988) was an Australian cricketer. He played four first-class matches for South Australia in 1946/47. He was the private operator of Englefield Stadium, a soccer stadium that was located in the Sydney suburb of Dural between 1967 and the mid-1990s.

== See also ==
- List of South Australian representative cricketers
