= Gardner transition =

In condensed matter physics, the Gardner transition refers to a temperature induced transition in which the free energy basin of a disordered system divides into many marginally stable sub-basins. It is named after Elizabeth Gardner who first described it in 1985.

== See also ==
- Glass transition
