= Thomas DiBella =

American mobster (1905–1988)

- Born: Thomas Salvatore DiBella; November 29, 1905; Brooklyn, New York, U.S.
- Died: June 6, 1988 (aged 82); Brooklyn, New York, U.S.
- Occupation: Crime boss
- Allegiance: Colombo crime family

Thomas "Tom" DiBella (November 29, 1905 – June 6, 1988) was an American mobster and one-time acting boss of the Colombo crime family.
