= Yiannis Xipolitas =

Cypriot footballer (born 1944)

Personal information
- Full name: Yiannakis Xipolitas
- Date of birth: 10 April 1944
- Place of birth: Cyprus
- Position: Defender

Senior career*
Years	Team	Apps	(Gls)
- Olympiakos Nicosia
- Canterbury

International career
1968	Cyprus	2	(?)

Managerial career
- 1977: Canterbury-Marrickville
- 1979: Sydney Olympic
- 1999–2002: Canterbury-Marrickville
- * Club domestic league appearances and goals

Yiannakis "Yiannis" Xipolitas (English: John Xipolitas)(born 10 April 1944) is a Cypriot former footballer. Xipolitas represented the Cyprus national football team twice.
