= George Gibson (footballer, born 1912) =

English footballer

Personal information
- Full name: George Eardley Gibson
- Date of birth: 29 August 1912
- Place of birth: Biddulph, England
- Date of death: 30 December 1990 (aged 78)
- Position: Inside left

Senior career*
Years	Team	Apps	(Gls)
- Kidderminster Harriers
1931–1932	Frickley Colliery		
1932–1934	Sunderland	2	(1)
1934–1935	Leicester City	2	(0)
1935–1936	Valenciennes		
1935–1936	Distillery		
1936–1937	Shelbourne		
1936–1937	RC Roubaix		
1937–1938	Workington		
1938–1939	Bradford City	3	(0)
- * Club domestic league appearances and goals

George Eardley Gibson (29 August 1912 – 30 December 1990) was an English professional footballer who played as an inside left. Gibson was an early pioneer of British overseas footballers, playing in the French Ligue 1 in the inter-war years. Gibson eventually went on to play football in four countries, including his native England. Whilst Gibson played professionally in England and France and played in the Football League and Ligue 1 he was never capped internationally.

== Early career ==
Born in Biddulph, Staffordshire, Gibson began his career with Kidderminster Harriers before being released and joining Frickley Colliery who gave him the opportunity to play regularly in the Midland League. In 1932 he signed professionally for Sunderland where he made two appearances in the Football League First Division, scoring one goal in a draw against Chelsea in the last game of the 1932–33 season (in which Chelsea's scorer was also named George Gibson). He transferred to Leicester City, for whom he also played in the Football League.

== Foreign career ==
In 1935 Gibson became one of the early English professional footballers to play abroad when he signed for Valenciennes, who had just been promoted to the top division in French football. After a year in France Gibson moved on to clubs in Northern Ireland and Ireland before returning to France to join RC Roubaix, who had just secured top-flight football.

== Return to England ==
Towards the end of his career Gibson joined Workington, where he also represented the cricket club as a fast bowler and batsman and briefly returned to the Football League with Bradford City where he made three league appearances.

== Sources ==
- Frost, Terry (1988). Bradford City A Complete Record 1903-1988. Breedon Books Sport. ISBN 0-907969-38-0.
