= Kjell Kleppe =

Norwegian biochemist

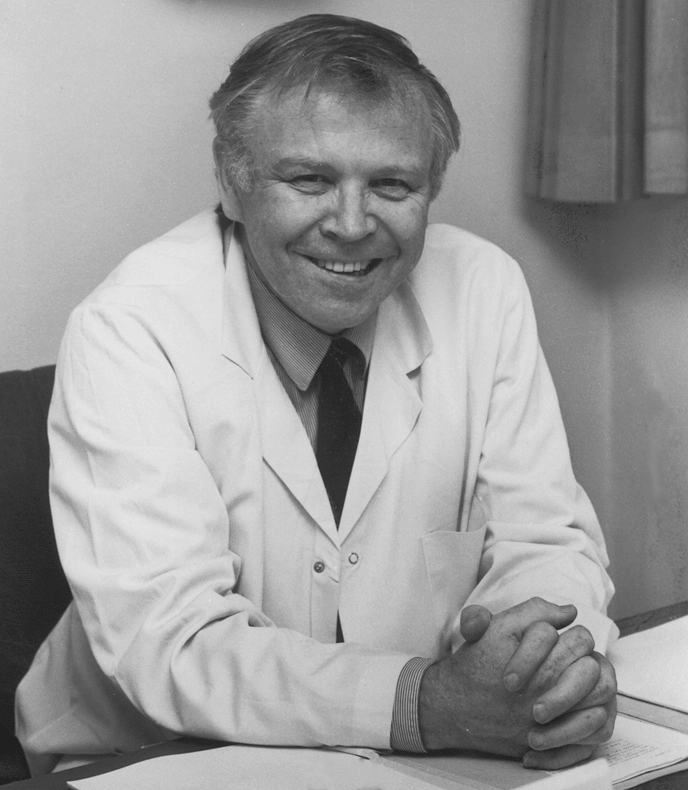
- Kjell Kleppe (1985)
- Born: December 9, 1934; Kleppe, Rogaland, Norway
- Died: June 18, 1988 (aged 53); Midtun, Bergen, Hordaland, Norway
- Education: University of Oslo (B.S.); University of Nebraska (Ph.D.)
- Known for: In vitro DNA amplification
- Scientific career
- Fields: Biochemistry
- Workplaces: University of Bergen

Kjell Kleppe (December 9, 1934 – June 18, 1988) was a Norwegian biochemist and molecular biologist who was a pioneer in the polymerase chain reaction (PCR) technique and built the first laboratory in the country for bio- and gene technology.

== Education and Career ==
Kleppe earned a bachelor's in chemistry from the University of Oslo (1955–1958) and a Ph.D. in enzymology from the University of Nebraska, USA (1958–1963). Kleppe conducted research at many prestigious universities, including Cambridge and Massachusetts Institute of Technology (MIT), and in 1966, he joined the University of Bergen, where he founded Felleslaboratorium for bioteknologi (FLB), the first gene technology laboratory in Norway with Professor Curt Endresen. He became a member of the European Molecular Biology Organization (EMBO) and Royal Norwegian Society of Sciences and Letters (DKNVS) in 1984.

== The PCR Experiment ==
Kleppe performed the first PCR experiment in 1969 while working in the laboratory of 1968 Nobel Prize winner, Har Gobind Khorana at the University of Wisconsin-Madison. He described the experiment at the 1969 Gordon Conference on Nucleic Acids. Kleppe published the first description of PCR, a process he referred to as repair replication, in the Journal of Molecular Biology in 1971. Like modern PCR, this early iteration used a two-primer system for the exponential replication of a segment of DNA.

== Legacy and Applications ==
Because of his initial discoveries and ideas, PCR can now be applied to forensics, genetics, and diagnostics. Recently, its most notable use is in connection to COVID-19 diagnostics, as it is able to identify bacteria and viruses.
