= Dave McIntosh =

Scottish footballer (1925–1995)

Personal information
- Full name: David McIntosh
- Date of birth: 4 May 1925
- Place of birth: Girvan, Scotland
- Date of death: 24 July 1995 (aged 70)
- Place of death: Glenrothes, Fife, Scotland
- Position: Goalkeeper

Youth career
- Girvan Athletic

Senior career*
| Years | Team | Apps | (Gls) |
| 1948–1957 | Sheffield Wednesday | 293 | (0) |
| 1957–1959 | Doncaster Rovers | 15 | (0) |
- * Club domestic league appearances and goals

Dave McIntosh (4 May 1925 – 24 July 1995) was a Scottish professional football player who played for Sheffield Wednesday and Doncaster Rovers as a goalkeeper. McIntosh was first choice goalkeeper for almost ten years at Sheffield Wednesday, playing a total of 293 games for the club.
