= George Gibson (footballer, born 1903) =

Scottish footballer

Personal information
- Full name: George Bennett Gibson
- Date of birth: 29 September 1903 (Note: Most sources state his birth year as 1907; it was commonplace for players of the time to adjust their ages down by a few years to appear younger and thus better value to clubs obtaining or retaining their services.)
- Place of birth: Hamilton, Scotland
- Date of death: 1977 (aged 73–74)
- Place of death: Glasgow, Scotland
- Height: 5 ft 9 in (1.75 m)
- Position: Inside left

Senior career*
Years	Team	Apps	(Gls)
–	Kirkintilloch Rob Roy		
1923–1925	Dundee	5	(1)
1924	→ St Johnstone (loan)	9	(2)
1925–1927	Hamilton Academical	73	(16)
1927–1933	Bolton Wanderers	236	(76)
1933–1939	Chelsea	131	(22)
Total		454	(117)
- * Club domestic league appearances and goals

George Bennett Gibson (29 September 1903 – 1977) was a Scottish footballer who played as an inside forward.

He began his senior career in Scotland with Dundee, but failed to claim a regular place and was loaned out to St Johnstone. After two seasons on Tayside, he joined hometown club Hamilton Academical (where his father Alex had once been club chairman) and became established as a highly talented player.

Gibson moved to English football with Bolton Wanderers in March 1927. Two years later, he was in the Trotters team which won the FA Cup, scoring in the semi-final win over Huddersfield Town at Anfield before playing his part in beating Portsmouth in the final at Wembley. With six years and 236 Football League First Division appearances for Bolton behind him, a strong performance and goal against Chelsea in February 1933 prompted the London club to sign him a few weeks later, and he spent the last five seasons of his professional career at Stamford Bridge before retiring.

In the last match of the 1932–33 Football League season, Gibson scored Chelsea's goal in a 1–1 draw with Sunderland, whose scorer was also called George Gibson.

== Honours ==
Bolton Wanderers

- FA Cup: 1928–29
