= Frederick Seabrook =

English cricketer

Personal information
- Born: 9 January 1899; Brockworth, Gloucester
- Died: 7 August 1979 (aged 80); Cirencester, Gloucestershire
- Batting: Right-handed

Domestic team information
- Years: Team
- 1919-1935: Gloucestershire
- Source: Cricinfo, 27 March 2014

Frederick James Seabrook (9 January 1899 – 7 August 1979) was an English first-class cricketer active 1919–35 who played for Gloucestershire and Cambridge University. He was born in Brockworth and died in Cirencester. He appeared in 143 first-class matches as a left-handed batsman who occasionally bowled slow left arm orthodox spin. Seabrook scored 5,335 career runs with a highest score of 136, one of eight centuries; he held 82 catches and took eight wickets with a best return of four for 77.
