= George Gibson (Australian footballer) =

Australian rules footballer

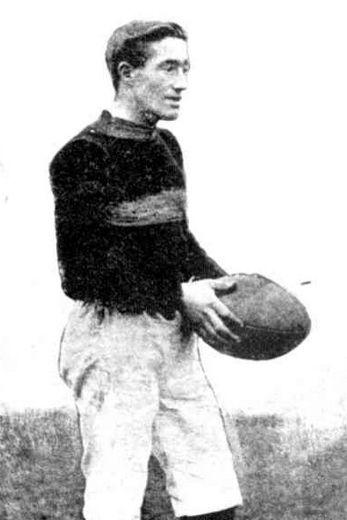
- Gibson in 1910

Personal information
- Full name: George Stormouth Henry Gibson
- Born: 23 June 1885; South Melbourne, Victoria
- Died: 31 December 1933 (aged 48); St Kilda, Victoria
- Original team: South Bunbury
- Height: 178 cm (5 ft 10 in)
- Weight: 75 kg (165 lb)
- Position: Half back

Playing career^{1}
Years	Club	Games (Goals)
1906	Essendon	4 (1)
1908–12	Richmond	70 (6)
Total		74 (7)
- ^{1} Playing statistics correct to the end of 1912.

George Stormouth Henry Gibson (23 June 1885 – 31 December 1933) was an Australian rules footballer who played with Essendon and Richmond in the Victorian Football League (VFL).
