= Keith Long (Australian footballer) =

Australian rules footballer, born 1910

Personal information
- Full name: Hurtle Keith Long
- Born: 9 May 1910
- Died: 30 June 1988 (aged 78)
- Original team: South Adelaide
- Height: 187 cm (6 ft 2 in)
- Weight: 86 kg (190 lb)

Playing career^{1}
Years	Club	Games (Goals)
1934–35	North Melbourne	18 (6)
- ^{1} Playing statistics correct to the end of 1935.

Hurtle Keith Long (9 May 1910 – 30 June 1988) was an Australian rules footballer who played with North Melbourne in the Victorian Football League (VFL).
