= Eric Cormack =

Australian rules footballer, born 1905

Personal information
- Full name: Eric Cormack
- Born: 18 February 1905
- Died: 9 June 1988 (aged 83)
- Original team: Kerang

Playing career^{1}
Years	Club	Games (Goals)
1926–27	St Kilda	11 (1)
- ^{1} Playing statistics correct to the end of 1927.

Eric Cormack (18 February 1905 – 9 June 1988) was an Australian rules footballer who played with St Kilda in the Victorian Football League (VFL).
