= Knut Ellingsrud =

Norwegian footballer (1903-1988)

Personal information
- Date of birth: 26 January 1903
- Place of birth: Horten, Norway
- Date of death: 24 June 1988 (aged 85)
- Position: Defender

International career
Years	Team	Apps	(Gls)
1928	Norway	1	(0)

Knut Ellingsrud (26 January 1903 – 24 June 1988) was a Norwegian footballer. He played in one match for the Norway national football team in 1928.
