= Stuart Markland =

Scottish footballer

Personal information
- Date of birth: 12 February 1948
- Place of birth: Edinburgh, Scotland
- Date of death: 1 April 2017 (aged 69)
- Position: Defender

Youth career
- Penicuik Athletic

Senior career*
Years	Team	Apps	(Gls)
1966–1968	Berwick Rangers	34	(5)
1968–1973	Dundee United	71	(1)
1973–1978	Montrose	148	(6)
1978	Sydney Olympic	20	(0)
1980–1981	Montrose	10	(1)
- Penicuik Athletic
Total		283	(13)
- * Club domestic league appearances and goals

Stuart Markland (12 February 1948 – 1 April 2017) was a Scottish footballer who played as a defender. He played junior football for Penicuik Athletic before beginning his senior career with Berwick Rangers in 1966. He joined Dundee United in 1968 and then Montrose in 1973. In 1978, he signed for Sydney Olympic in Australia's National Soccer League. He rejoined Montrose in 1980 and also played for Penicuik again before retiring. Markland died on 1 April 2017, aged 69.
