= Daniel Menaker =

American writer and editor (1941–2020)

- Born: Robert Daniel Menaker; September 17, 1941; Manhattan, New York City, U.S.
- Died: October 26, 2020 (aged 79); New Marlborough, Massachusetts, U.S.
- Education: Swarthmore College; Johns Hopkins University
- Occupations: Author; editor
- Spouse: Katherine Bouton (m. 1980)
- Children: 2

Robert Daniel Menaker (September 17, 1941 – October 26, 2020) was an American fiction writer and editor. He worked with the MFA program at Stony Brook Southampton and as a consultant for Barnes & Noble Bookstores.

== Personal life ==
Menaker was born in Manhattan to Robert Menaker — son of a Russian Jewish immigrant — and Mary R. Grace, who was the chief copy editor at Fortune magazine. He attended Little Red School House in Greenwich Village and Nyack High School in Rockland County, New York, studied philosophy and poetry at Swarthmore College in Pennsylvania, and obtained a master's degree in English from Johns Hopkins University. Menaker's father was a communist who was additionally alleged to be a Soviet intelligence agent, and Menaker described himself as an anarcho-syndicalist.

Menaker married Katherine Bouton in 1980. They had two children: a daughter, Elizabeth, and a son, Will, who is a co-host of the podcast Chapo Trap House.

Menaker died from pancreatic cancer on October 26, 2020, at his home in New Marlborough, Massachusetts.

== Career ==
Menaker was a fiction editor at The New Yorker for twenty years and had material published in the magazine frequently. In 1995 he was hired by Harold Evans as Senior Literary Editor at Random House and later became Executive Editor-in-Chief, working with such writers as Salman Rushdie, Colum McCann, Elizabeth Strout, and Nassim Taleb. After leaving Random House in 2007, he became the host for a web-based book show called "Titlepage" in 2008.

== Awards ==
- PEN/O. Henry Award for Short Fiction: "The Good Left" 1982
- PEN/O. Henry Award for Short Fiction: "The Good Left" 1984
- New York Times Notable Book: The Treatment 1998

== Publications ==
- Friends and Relations: A Collection of Stories - 1976
- The Worst (with Charles McGrath) - 1979
- The Old Left and Other Stories - 1987
- The Treatment (novel) - 1998
- A Good Talk: The Story and Skill of Conversation - 2011
- My Mistake: A Memoir - 2013
- "The Committee: The Story of the 1976 Union Drive at the New Yorker Magazine" - (article, audiobook) 2015
- The African Svelte: Ingenious Misspellings that Make Surprising Sense - 2016
- Terminalia: Poems - 2021
