= Ian Aitchison =

British physicist

- Born: 1936 (age 89–90); Lancaster, Lancashire, England

Academic background
- Education: Peterhouse, Cambridge

Academic work
- Discipline: Theoretical physics
- Institutions: University of Oxford

Ian Johnston Rhind Aitchison (born 1936) is a British physicist and retired academic who was Professor of Physics at the University of Oxford between 1996 and 2003.

== Career ==
Born in 1936, Aitchison read mathematics at Peterhouse, Cambridge, graduating with a BA in 1958; he then completed a PhD in theoretical physics there in 1961.

Between 1961 and 1963, Aitchison was a research associate at Brookhaven National Laboratory in New York, United States; after a year at the Saclay Nuclear Research Centre in France, he worked as a research associate at the Cavendish Laboratory at the University of Cambridge from 1964 to 1966. In 1966, he was elected a fellow of Worcester College, Oxford, and appointed a university lecturer in theoretical physics; he was awarded the title of Professor of Physics in 1996 and retired in 2003. He remains an emeritus professor at the University of Oxford.

== Bibliography ==
- Relativistic Quantum Mechanics (Macmillan, 1972).
- (Co-editor with Jack E. Paton) Rudolf Peierls and Theoretical Physics: Proceedings of the symposium held in Oxford on July 11th & 12th, 1974, to mark the occasion of the retirement of Professor Sir Rudolph E. Peierls, F.R.S., C.B.E. (Pergamon Press, 1977). ISBN 0-08-020606-9 hbk.
- (Co-authored with A. J. G. Hey) Gauge Theories in Particle Physics (1st ed. Hilger and University of Sussex Press, 1982; 2nd ed. 1989; 3rd ed. Taylor and Francis, 2002; 4th ed., vols. 1 & 2 CRC Press, 2012; 5th ed., vols. 1 & 2 CRC Press, 2024).
- An Informal Introduction to Gauge Field Theories (Cambridge University Press, 1982; reprinted with corrections, 1984; digitally printed with additional corrections, 2007).
- (Co-editor with C. H. Llewellyn Smith and J. E. Paton) Plots, Quarks and Strange Particles: Proceedings of the Dalitz Conference 1990 (World Scientific, 1991).
- Supersymmetry in Particle Physics: An Elementary Introduction (Cambridge University Press, 2007). ISBN 9781139467056
