= Marianne Van Hirtum =

Belgian writer (1935-1988)

Marianne Van Hirtum (20 July 1935 – 11 June 1988) was a Belgian author writing in the French language, connected with the surrealist movement.

She was born in Namur, the daughter of Louis Van Hirtum, a doctor at a psychiatric hospital.

Van Hirtum met André Breton in 1959, the same year in which she participated in the International Surrealist Exhibition in Paris. She died in Paris, aged 52.

== Bibliography ==
- Poèmes pour les petits pauvres, Paris, Seghers 1953.
- Les Insolites, Paris, Gallimard 1956.
- La Nuit mathématique, Mortemart, Rougerie 1976.
- Les Balançoires d'Euclide, Mortemart, Rougerie 1977.
- Maisons, Parisod 1977.
- Le Cheval-arquebuse, Orléans, Jean-Jacques Sergent 1978.
- Le Trépied des algèbres, Mortemart, Rougerie 1980.
- Le Papillon mental, Mortemart, Rougerie 1982.
- John the Pelican, Hourglass, 1990.
- Proteus volens, Hourglass 1991.
- Peintures, dessins, objets, Hourglass 1991.
