= George Gibson (Victoria cricketer) =

Australian cricketer

Personal information
- Full name: George Watson Hogg Gibson
- Born: 16 January 1827; Saint David Parish, Jamaica
- Died: 5 September 1910 (aged 83); Carlton, Melbourne, Australia
- Batting: Right-handed
- Role: Wicketkeeper-batsman

Domestic team information
- Years: Team
- 1865–1873: Victoria

Career statistics
Competition	First-class
Matches	9
Runs scored	214
Batting average	16.46
100s/50s	0/0
Top score	41
Balls bowled	0
Wickets	–
Bowling average	–
5 wickets in innings	–
10 wickets in match	–
Best bowling	–
Catches/stumpings	4/5
- Source: Cricinfo, 19 October 2021

George Watson Hogg Gibson (16 January 1827 – 5 September 1910) was an Australian cricketer. He played nine first-class cricket matches for Victoria between 1865 and 1873.

== Life ==
Gibson was born in Jamaica and educated in Scotland and migrated to Victoria in the 1850s. His highest first-class score was 41, the highest score for either side, when Victoria beat New South Wales by an innings in April 1872. In the next contest between the two teams 11 months later, at the age of 45 Gibson captained Victoria and again top-scored in the match, this time with 32 and 15 not out, in a 24-run victory to Victoria. He was renowned locally for practising his batting using an axe handle instead of a cricket bat.

Gibson had a chemist's shop on Lygon Street in the Melbourne suburb of Carlton, which he ran with his business partner, Miss Maloney, under the name Gibson and Maloney.
