= John Groth =

Illustrator (1908–1988)

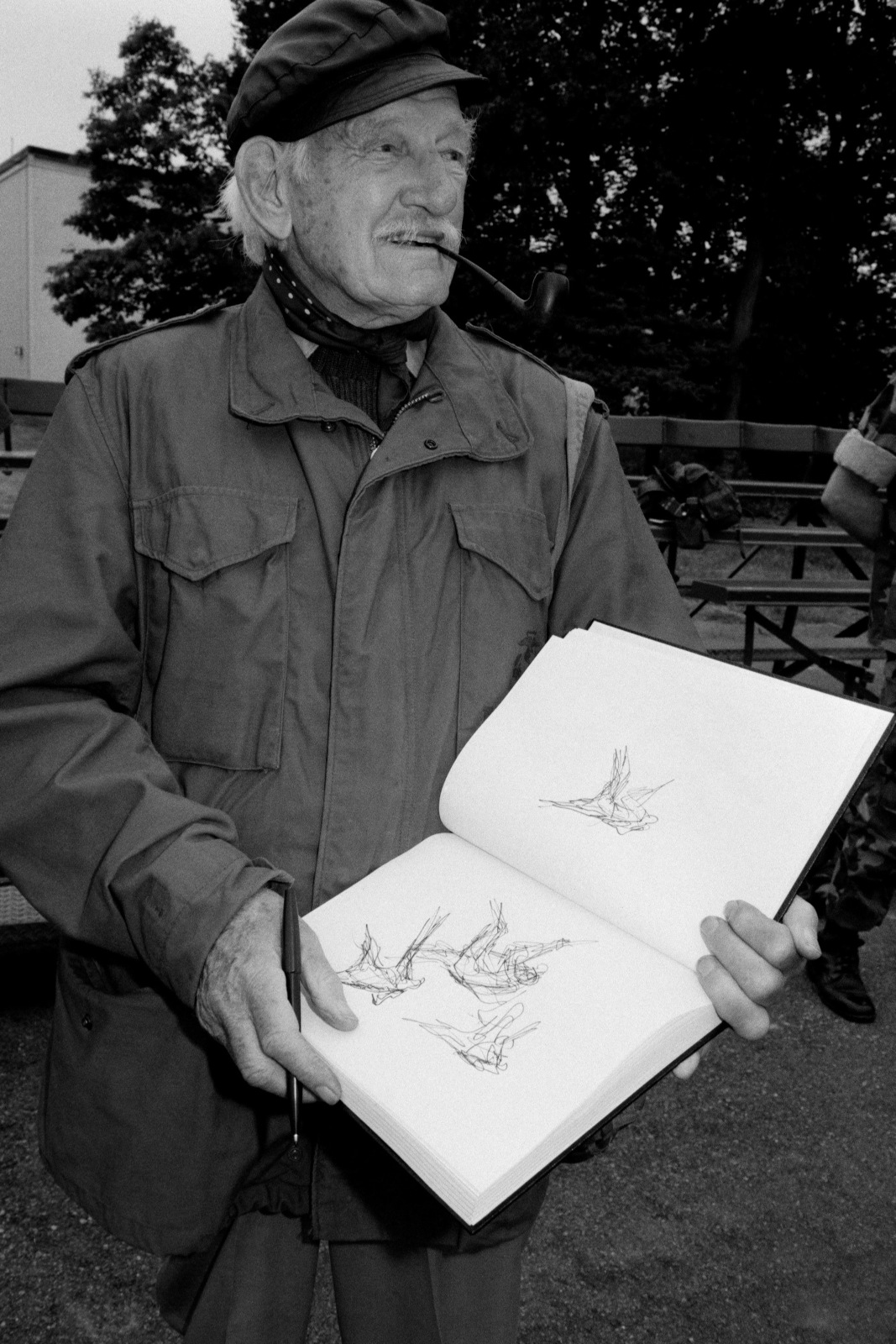
Combat artist John Groth sketches at Quantico military base.

John August Groth (February 26, 1908 – June 27, 1988) was an American illustrator and teacher. He gained recognition as a war correspondent-illustrator, where he incorporated a technique he called the "speed line". He was the first art director of Esquire Magazine and taught at the Art Students League, the Pratt Institute, and the Parsons School of Design.

In 1940, he was featured in an exhibition at MOMA, titled, "PM Competition: The Artist as Reporter".

== Career ==
Groth began sketching intently during the Great Depression after studying at the Art Institute of Chicago. Following the advice of an editor, he penned 100 sketches a day for years. He learned to increase his speed by listening to sports on the radio and sketching the action as fast as he could. "I would listen to the games on the radio at night, and sketch the plays. It made me very quick." His break came when Arnold Gingrich, an editor for Esquire magazine, approached him at an art show in Chicago and offered him a position. "The way (Arnold Gingrich) told it," Groth says, "he found this barefoot, bearded kid in the park, and the next day made him art director of the world's leading men's fashion magazine. But I swear I was wearing shoes." Groth went on to work as a correspondent and illustrator for the Chicago Sun, Collier's, Sports Illustrated, and The Saturday Evening Post.

He developed a passion for war zones. He covered six different wars and was one of the first correspondents in Paris after its liberation. "It is only at war that I feel complete... There, you meet all sort of men – farmers, mechanics, college professors. It rains on them and it rains on you. The shells burst in the air, and you are there, too." He would make a splash when he beat out friend and rival Ernest Hemingway into Paris in 1944. Hemingway was writing for the Chicago Tribune and Groth for the Chicago Sun. Groth was in the first jeep into Paris and got the scoop. His headline read, "Yanks are in Paris!" Hemingway would later write about Groth's technique. "None of us understood the sort of shorthand he sketched in. The men would look at the sketches and see just a lot of lines. It was a great pleasure to find what fine drawings they were when we got to see them."

Groth went on to illustrate such classic books as A Christmas Carol, All Quiet on the Western Front, The Grapes of Wrath, The War Prayer, and Gone with the Wind.

== Legacy ==
Deborah Churchman described Groth's work in a 1980 Washington Post article: "Groth's pictures center on the day-to-day life of people caught in terrifying circumstances – armies occupying cities, soldiers sweeping roads for land mines, bullfighters facing death." Bernie Schonfeld, a photographer for Life Magazine said of Groth, "John is one of the gentlest people in the world, and he always gets himself into the wildest hell hole."

Starting in 1942, Groth taught a weekly class at the Arts Students League, where he passed on his skills to up and coming artists. "You must think big and start big. I get some students who start with the models' bellybutton."

His work is in public collections including the Metropolitan Museum of Art and the Art Institute of Chicago.
