= Floyd Miller =

Floyd Cleveland Miller (March 20, 1912 – June 4, 1988) was a member of the Communist Party USA (CPUSA), who confessed in 1954 to having worked for the Soviet intelligence agencies.

Miller was born in South Bend, Indiana and attended school in Michigan. In 1934, he moved to New York and began writing soap operas for radio station WMCA. Miller joined the Communist Party of the CPUSA in 1936. That same year, Gregory Rabinowitz recruited him to do "opposition work," against rival political organizations. Miller's first year in the business was listening to a wiretap on Trotskyist leader, James Cannon's home. Later, he was to infiltrate the Socialist Workers Party (SWP) and become an activist, while sending reports to the CPUSA and Soviet intelligence. The Trotskyists assigned him to the Sailors Union of the Pacific in 1941, and he became editor of the union's journal, in addition to writing on military affairs for the Fourth International, a Trotskyist journal, during World War II. Miller's position gave the Communists a spy in the upper ranks of a rival union. Miller stated later, "My job as a Stalinist was to keep track of the sailing of all Trotskyite seamen so a Stalinist agent would be at the port and have surveillance on whatever Trotskyites entered the Soviet Union."

Miller's primary KGB contacts, as noted in Venona traffic, were Joseph Katz and a woman he knew as Sylvia Getzoff, also known as Rebecca Getzoff.

In the first half of 1944, Miller met in New York with Jack Soble who provided the KGB with microfilm of the page proofs of Leon Trotsky's biography of Joseph Stalin. Miller carried the microfilm to Mexico for the SWP to present to Natalia Sedova, Trotsky's widow. While in Mexico, Miller spent six weeks living in the Trotsky household. When he returned to New York, Miller delivered a written report to the KGB.

Miller confessed his covert activities to the FBI in 1954 and appeared as a witness in Robert Soblen's espionage trial in 1961. He testified that his 1944 Mexican assignment included investigating reports of a budding alliance between Trotskyists, anarchists, and other radical groups in contact with French writer Victor Serge, who was living in exile. Miller testified that he was introduced to Lucy Booker, a courier between Miller and Soble in 1945. Reports on the Trotskyists were typed in Booker's residence. Soble informed Miller in 1945 that he was being transferred to another controller, and it was then that he was introduced to Soblen. Miller's story is confirmed by numerous decrypted Venona documents. Miller stated that he ceased activities for the KGB in 1945, and began writing children's books.

== Venona ==
Floyd Cleveland Miller is referenced in the following Venona project decryptions:

727 KGB New York to Moscow, 20 May 1944; 751–752 KGB New York to Moscow, 26 May 1944; 826 KGB New York to Moscow, 7 June 1944; 846 KGB New York to Moscow, 14 June 1944; 851 KGB New York to Moscow, 15 June 1944; 1143–1144 KGB New York to Moscow, 10 August 1944.
