= Englefield Stadium =

Former soccer stadium in Dural, New South Wales

- The stadium during It's a Knockout in 1987
- Interactive map of Englefield Stadium
- Address: Dural, New South Wales
- Coordinates: 33.71644°S 151.03284°E
- Record attendance: 3,245 (Western Suburbs vs Marconi, 1 June 1977)

Construction
- Opened: 1967; 59 years ago
- Demolished: Mid-1990s; 35 years ago

Tenant
- Western Suburbs SC (1977–1978)

Englefield Stadium was a soccer stadium located in the Sydney suburb of Dural. It was the home of Western Suburbs SC between 1977 and 1978, hosting a total of twelve National Soccer League (NSL) matches.

== History ==
Englefield Stadium was opened in 1967, replacing a poultry farm that previously occupied the land. The stadium was privately run by William Englefield (1917–1988), a former cricketer who played for South Australia in the Sheffield Shield, and Donald Lawson.

During the early 1970s, the stadium was used by the Australia men's national soccer team as its training base before the 1974 FIFA World Cup (the first World Cup that Australia had qualified for).

Western Suburbs SC was a foundation club of the National Soccer League in 1977. Its first match at Englefield Stadium was on 1 June 1977 against Marconi in front of a crowd of 3,245 people. However, attendance also reached as low as 521 people later in the season.

Englefield Stadium hosted four NSL matches in 1978, but it continued to suffer from low crowd numbers. After just 500 people attended Western Suburbs' round 6 match against Brisbane City, the club moved to Wentworth Park for the remainder of the season, where it played double-headers with Eastern Suburbs.

Following the conclusion of the 1978 NSL season, Western Suburbs was absorbed by APIA Leichhardt FC. Englefield Stadium hosted one New South Wales Super League match in 1979, while Australia's under-21 and under-19 teams also trained at the stadium prior to the 1981 FIFA World Youth Championship.

In 1985, the stadium was converted into the production location for It's a Knockout, a game show that was broadcast on Network Ten. Bleacher seating for 1,200 people was added, with the venue also featuring six light towers that allowed for the show to be filmed at night. However, because of numerous noise complaints from local residents, It's a Knockout ended in September 1987.

The venue was sold at a public auction on 15 June 1989. The remaining features of the stadium were later demolished, with the building of dwellings on the land commencing in the 1990s.
