= Dave Harding =

English-born Australian soccer player

Personal information
- Full name: David Harding
- Date of birth: 14 August 1946 (age 80)
- Place of birth: Liverpool, England
- Position: Midfielder

Senior career*
Years	Team	Apps	(Gls)
1965–1966	Wrexham	10	(7)
1966–1967	New Brighton		
1967–1969	South Liverpool		
1969–1976	Pan-Hellenic	?	(?)
1976–1978	Western Suburbs	51+	(7+)
1979–1980	Blacktown City	7+	(1+)
1980–1981	A.P.I.A. Leichhardt	11	(3)

International career^{‡}
1974–1977	Australia	23	(2)
- * Club domestic league appearances and goals as of 13:05, 4 April 2026 (UTC) ‡ National team caps and goals as of 13:05, 4 April 2026 (UTC)

David Harding (born 14 August 1946) is a former soccer player who played as a midfielder. He began his career in the English leagues before migrating to Australia, where he played in the New South Wales State League and later the National Soccer League (NSL). He represented Australia 45 times, including in 23 full international matches. He was a member of Australia's 1974 FIFA World Cup squad but did not make an appearance in the tournament.

== Club career ==
Harding made his Football League debut for Wrexham as an amateur in August 1965. In all, he played ten times for the Welsh side during the 1965–66 Fourth Division season. He played for New Brighton in the Cheshire League in 1967–68 and later played for South Liverpool in the Northern Premier League.

In 1969, Harding moved to Australia and made his debut for Pan-Hellenic in the 1969 New South Wales State League.

During the 1976 season, Harding transferred from Pan-Hellenic to Western Suburbs for a fee reported to be A$8,500. Harding played 51 times for Western Suburbs in the 1977 and 1978 NSL seasons, scoring seven times.

In 1979, Harding joined Blacktown City in the New South Wales State League. With the team joining the national league in 1980, Harding played seven NSL matches before moving to APIA Leichhardt, where he played a further nine times. He played twice for APIA in the 1981 season to round out his national league career.

== International career ==
Harding was a member of the Australian 1974 FIFA World Cup squad in West Germany and represented Australia 45 times between 1974 and 1977, scoring 11 times.
