= John Karaspyros =

Australian footballer

John Karaspyros (born 9 March 1960) is an Australian former association football player, whose primary position was defender.

== Playing career ==
=== Club career ===
Karaspyros played in for Sydney Olympic FC in the National Soccer League and Canterbury-Marrickville in the New South Wales State League.

=== International career ===
Karaspyros played one full international for Australia in 1978 against Greece in Sydney.
