= Alan Ainslie =

Australian soccer player

Personal information
- Full name: Alan Ainslie
- Date of birth: 1947 (age 78–79)
- Place of birth: Berwick-upon-Tweed, England
- Positions: Midfielder; forward

Youth career
- Spittal Rovers
- Gala Fairydean

Senior career*
Years	Team	Apps	(Gls)
1965–1968	Berwick Rangers	38	(9)
1969–1972	St. George Budapest		
1977	Western Suburbs	21	(3)
1978–1979	Sydney Olympic	41	(8)
Total		100	(20)

International career
1971–1976	Australia	4	(1)
- * Club domestic league appearances and goals

Alan Ainslie (born 1947) is a former Australian professional soccer player who played as a midfielder and forward for Berwick Rangers, Western Suburbs, Sydney Olympic and the Australia national soccer team.

== International career ==
Ainslie played for Australia and played four international friendlies with one goal against Israel.

== Career statistics ==
=== Club ===
Appearances and goals by club, season and competition
Club	Season	League			Cup		Other		Total	
Club	Season	Division	Apps	Goals	Apps	Goals	Apps	Goals	Apps	Goals
Berwick Rangers	1965–66	Second Division	6	1	—	—	—	—	6	1
Berwick Rangers	1966–67	Second Division	17	8	—	—	—	—	17	8
Berwick Rangers	1967–68	Second Division	15	0	—	—	—	—	15	0
Berwick Rangers	Total		38	9	—	—	—	—	38	9
Western Suburbs	1977	National Soccer League	21	3	—	—	—	—	21	3
Western Suburbs	Total		21	3	—	—	—	—	21	3
Sydney Olympic	1978	National Soccer League	26	7	—	—	—	—	26	7
Sydney Olympic	1979	National Soccer League	15	1	—	—	—	—	15	1
Sydney Olympic	Total		41	8	—	—	—	—	41	8
Career total			100	20	—	—	—	—	100	20

=== International ===
National team	Year	Competitive		Friendly		Total	
National team	Year	Apps	Goals	Apps	Goals	Apps	Goals
Australia	1971	0	0	3	1	3	1
Australia	1976	0	0	1	0	1	0
