= George Gibson (footballer, born 1945) =

Scottish footballer

Personal information
- Full name: George F. Gibson
- Date of birth: 15 November 1945 (age 80)
- Place of birth: Scotland
- Positions: Central defender; midfielder

Senior career*
| Years | Team | Apps | (Gls) |
- West Calder United
| 1966–1977 | Falkirk | 289 | (9) |
| 1977–1979 | Sydney Olympic | 23 | (0) |
| Total | | 312 | (9) |
- * Club domestic league appearances and goals

George F. Gibson (born 11 November 1945) is a Scottish former professional footballer who played as a central defender and midfielder.

== Career ==
Gibson played in Scotland and Australia for West Calder United, Falkirk and Sydney Olympic.
