= Peter Stone (soccer, born 1954) =

Australian soccer player (1954–2022)

Personal information
- Full name: Peter Lloyd Stone
- Date of birth: 30 September 1954
- Place of birth: Brisbane, Queensland, Australia
- Date of death: 21 August 2022 (aged 67)
- Position: Midfielder

Youth career
- Kotara South
- Adamstown Rosebud

Senior career*
Years	Team	Apps	(Gls)
- Adamstown Rosebud
1971–1978	Western Suburbs		
1979–1980	APIA Leichhardt		
1981–1983	St. George		

International career
1976–1983	Australia	15	(0)
- * Club domestic league appearances and goals

Peter Lloyd Stone (30 September 1954 – 21 August 2022) was an Australian soccer player who played as a midfielder. He made 15 appearances for the Australia national team.

== Club career ==
Born in Brisbane, Stone played his junior football for Kotara South and Adamstown Rosebud, also playing at senior level for the latter. He went on to play for Western Suburbs in the NSW Super League at state level (1973–1976) and the National Soccer League (1977).

In 1978, he moved to APIA Leichhardt, where he spent three NSL seasons.

Stone moved to St. George in 1980, where he played two seasons.

He retired in 1983, aged 29.

== International career ==
Stone made his international debut for the Australia national team in 1976 against Hong Kong. He earned 15 caps.
