= 1973 Oceania Cup squads =

The following is a list of players used by each competing nation during the entirety of the 1973 OFC Nations Cup.

== New Zealand ==
Coach: (New Zealand) Barrie Truman

No.	Pos.	Player	Date of birth (age)	Caps	Goals	Club
1	GK	Kevin Curtin				(New Zealand Football) Mount Wellington AFC
2	DF	Maurice Tillotson	20 January 1944 (aged 29)			(New Zealand Football) Gisborne City
3	DF	Gary Lake				(New Zealand Football) Blockhouse Bay
4	MF	Brian Hardman				(New Zealand Football) Christchurch United
5	MF	Malcolm Ferguson				(New Zealand Football) Queens Park
6	DF	Colin Latimour	11 December 1946 (aged 26)			(New Zealand Football) Eastern Suburbs AFC
7	FW	Tony Sibley	29 September 1950 (aged 22)			(New Zealand Football) Mount Wellington AFC
8	MF	Brian Armstrong				(New Zealand Football) Mount Wellington AFC
9	FW	Alan Marley	8 March 1951 (aged 21)			(New Zealand Football) Mount Wellington AFC
10	MF	Malcolm Bland	1949			(New Zealand Football) Eastern Suburbs AFC
11	MF	Brian Turner	31 July 1949 (aged 23)			(New Zealand Football) Eastern Suburbs AFC
12	GK	John Morris	5 March 1950 (aged 22)			(New Zealand Football) Blockhouse Bay
13	FW	Dave Taylor	1951			(New Zealand Football) Mount Wellington AFC
16	MF	Geoff Brand	14 May 1946 (aged 26)			(New Zealand Football) Stop Out
18	MF	Dennis Tindall				(New Zealand Football) Melville
19	FW	Alan Vest	5 September 1939 (aged 33)			(New Zealand Football) Gisborne City
21	MF	John Staines				(New Zealand Football) Eastern Suburbs AFC
23	MF	Ron Armstrong				(New Zealand Football) Mount Wellington AFC

== Fiji ==
Coach: (Fiji) Sashi Mahendra Singh

No.	Pos.	Player	Date of birth (age)	Caps	Goals	Club
	GK	Nicholas Rounds	1948			(Fiji Football Association) Rewa
	GK	John Foster	1948			(Fiji Football Association) Suva
	DF	Terio Vakatawa				(Fiji Football Association)
	DF	Nemarii Waka	22 May 1950 (aged 22)			(Fiji Football Association) Ba
	DF	Gordon Lee Wai	1949			(Fiji Football Association) Labasa
	DF	George Koi	1949			(Fiji Football Association) Suva
	DF	Waisea Naicovu				(Fiji Football Association) Ba
	MF	Samu Vacago	26 December 1952 (aged 20)			(Fiji Football Association) Nadi
	MF	Joseph Gock	1948			(Fiji Football Association) Lautoka
	MF	Marayam Sami Sada				(Fiji Football Association) Lautoka
	MF	Mun Lai				(Fiji Football Association) Suva
	MF	John Krishna Chotka				(Fiji Football Association) Suva
	FW	Vilitate Lee	1944			(Fiji Football Association) Rewa
	FW	Kini Kawatevu				(Fiji Football Association) Suva
	FW	Josateki Kurivitu				(Fiji Football Association) Ba
	FW	Farouk Janeman	17 February 1953 (aged 20)			(Fiji Football Association) Nadi
	FW	Habib Buksh				(Fiji Football Association) Rewa

== Tahiti ==
Coach: Freddy Vernaudon

No.	Pos.	Player	Date of birth (age)	Caps	Goals	Club
	GK	Georges Piehi	29 May 1946 (aged 26)			(Tahitian Football Federation) AS Vaiete
	GK	Tony Mottet				(Tahitian Football Federation) AS Tefana
	DF	Joseph Burns				(Tahitian Football Federation) AS Samine
	DF	Alexis Tumahai				(Tahitian Football Federation) AS Tiare Anani
	DF	Georges Chavez				(Tahitian Football Federation) AS Dragon
	DF	Gérard Kautai	16 February 1952 (aged 21)			(Tahitian Football Federation) AS Venus
	DF	Albert Taaroamea				(Tahitian Football Federation) AS Excelsior
	DF	Charles Temarii	8 April 1946 (aged 26)			(Tahitian Football Federation) AS Central Sport
	DF	Albert Taaroamea				(Tahitian Football Federation) AS Excelsior
	MF	Lewis Lai San				(Tahitian Football Federation) AS Excelsior
	MF	Theodore Riritua				(Tahitian Football Federation) AS Aorai
	MF	Gilles Malinowski	1955			(Tahitian Football Federation) AS Excelsior
	MF	Mana Temaiana				(Tahitian Football Federation) AS Tiare Anani
	MF	Roland de Marigny				(Tahitian Football Federation) AS Central Sport
	MF	Terii Etaeta				(Tahitian Football Federation) AS Dragon
	FW	Claude Carrara	28 April 1947 (aged 25)			(Tahitian Football Federation) AS Arue
	FW	Erroll Bennett	7 May 1950 (aged 22)			(Tahitian Football Federation) AS Central Sport
	FW	Harold Ng Fok				(Tahitian Football Federation) AS Venus
	MF	Wiliam Aumeran				(Tahitian Football Federation) AS Tefana

== New Hebrides ==
Coach: (England) Paul Reichert

No.	Pos.	Player	Date of birth (age)	Caps	Goals	Club
	GK	Jean Delaveuve				(Vanuatu Football Federation)
	DF	Pierre Waina				(Vanuatu Football Federation)
	DF	Popette Malas				(Vanuatu Football Federation)
	DF	Charles Galinie				(Vanuatu Football Federation)
	DF	Jules Galibert				(Vanuatu Football Federation)
	DF	Molissa Daniel				(Vanuatu Football Federation)
	DF	Densley Jonylulu				(Vanuatu Football Federation)
	MF	Albert Coulon				(Vanuatu Football Federation) Amicale
	MF	Jimmy Meto				(Vanuatu Football Federation)
	MF	Bernard Courtet				(Vanuatu Football Federation)
	MF	Alick Saurei				(Vanuatu Football Federation)
	FW	Michael Dupuy				(Vanuatu Football Federation)
	FW	Jacky Valette				(Vanuatu Football Federation)
	FW	Jacques Nafouri				(Vanuatu Football Federation)
	FW	Raymond Valette				(Vanuatu Football Federation)

== New Caledonia ==
Coach: (New Caledonia) Guy Elmour

No.	Pos.	Player	Date of birth (age)	Caps	Goals	Club
	GK	Michael Matzach				(New Caledonian Football Federation)
	GK	Richard Gurrera	10 March 1944 (aged 28)			(New Caledonian Football Federation) Nouméa ASLN
	DF	Simon Bearune	5 February 1948 (aged 25)			(New Caledonian Football Federation)
	DF	Bob Moindu				(New Caledonian Football Federation)
	DF	Simon Kecine				(New Caledonian Football Federation) ASC Gaïca
	DF	Bernard Ukeiwé	24 June 1953 (aged 19)			(New Caledonian Football Federation) AS Lössi
	DF	Andre Benebig				(New Caledonian Football Federation)
	DF	Roger Mandin				(New Caledonian Football Federation)
	MF	Jacques Koindredi	14 March 1949 (aged 23)			(New Caledonian Football Federation) Nouméa ASLN
	MF	Segin Wayewol	3 January 1949 (aged 24)			(New Caledonian Football Federation) JS Maré
	MF	Gerald Delmas	15 July 1941 (aged 31)			(New Caledonian Football Federation) JS Vallée du Tir
	MF	Jean Hmae	1951			(New Caledonian Football Federation) JS Maré
	MF	Luke Anglio				(New Caledonian Football Federation) Nouméa ASLN
	FW	Pierre Wacapo	27 July 1952 (aged 20)			(New Caledonian Football Federation)
	FW	Jean Wadriako				(New Caledonian Football Federation)
	FW	Bernard Waka				(New Caledonian Football Federation) Nouméa ASLN
	FW	Phadom Wacope				(New Caledonian Football Federation)
	FW	Jean Xowie	20 September 1951 (aged 21)			(New Caledonian Football Federation)
