= New Zealand at the OFC Men's Nations Cup =

The New Zealand men's national football team has competed in all eleven editions of the OFC Men's Nations Cup, and have won six times, the most recent coming in the 2024 tournament.

On 1 January 2006, Australia ceased to be a member of the Oceania Football Confederation, having elected to join the Asian Football Confederation (AFC), and have not taken part in the OFC Nations Cup since.

== OFC Nations Cup record ==
New Zealand's OFC Nations Cup record
Year	Host	Round	Pos.	Pld	W	D	L	GF	GA	Squad
1973	New Zealand	Champions	1st	5	4	1	0	13	4	Squad
1980	New Caledonia	Group stage	5th	3	1	0	2	7	8	—N/a
1996		Semi-finals	3rd	2	0	1	1	0	3	Squad
1998	Australia	Champions	1st	4	4	0	0	11	1	Squad
2000	Tahiti	Runners-up	2nd	4	3	0	1	7	3	Squad
2002	New Zealand	Champions	1st	5	5	0	0	23	2	Squad
2004	Australia	Third place	3rd	5	3	0	2	17	5	Squad
2008		Champions	1st	6	5	0	1	14	5	Squad
2012	Solomon Islands	Third place	3rd	5	3	1	1	8	7	Squad
2016	Papua New Guinea	Champions	1st	5	4	1	0	10	1	Squad
2024	Fiji, Vanuatu	Champions	1st	4	4	0	0	15	0	Squad
Total		6 titles	11/11	48	36	4	8	125	39	—
Champions Runners-up Third place

=== Record by opponent ===
As of 30 June 2024

OFC Nations Cup matches (by team)
Opponent	Pld	W	D	L	GF	GA
Australia	6	2	1	3	2	6
Fiji	8	6	0	2	16	8
New Caledonia	5	4	0	1	9	4
Papua New Guinea	3	2	1	0	11	2
Solomon Islands	8	7	1	0	26	6
Tahiti	8	6	1	1	26	4
Vanuatu*	10	9	0	1	37	9

- Games against New Hebrides are included in statistics of Vanuatu.

== 1973 Oceania Cup ==
The first edition of the Oceania Nations Cup (known as the "Oceania Cup") took place in Newmarket Park in Auckland, New Zealand. Five countries participated in one group where each team played each other once. The top two teams progressed to the final where New Zealand defeated Tahiti 2-0 to be crowned champions.

=== First round ===
Team	Pld	W	D	L	GF	GA	GD	Pts	Qualification
New Zealand	4	3	1	0	11	4	+7	10	Advance to final
Tahiti	4	2	2	0	7	2	+5	8	Advance to final
New Caledonia	4	2	0	2	8	5	+3	6	Advance to third place play-off
New Hebrides	4	1	1	2	4	8	–4	4	Advance to third place play-off
Fiji	4	0	0	4	2	13	–11	0	

17 February 1973

New Zealand	5–1	Fiji
Brian Turner (?); David Taylor (?); Geoff Brand (?); Malcolm Bland (?); Alan Vest (?)		Terio Vakatawa (?)

Newmarket Park, Auckland
Referee: A. Nakagawa (New Caledonia)

18 February 1973

New Zealand	1–1	Tahiti
Alan Vest (?)		Erroll Bennett (?)

Newmarket Park, Auckland
Referee: P. Raman (Fiji)

21 February 1973

New Zealand	2–1	New Caledonia
Alan Marley (?); Colin Latimour (?)		Jean Xowie (?)

Newmarket Park, Auckland
Referee: B. Chaudet (New Hebrides)

23 February 1973

New Zealand	3–1	New Hebrides
Malcolm Bland (?); Brian Hardman (?); Alan Marley (?)		Raymond Valette (?)

Newmarket Park, Auckland
Referee: P. Tahuaitu (Tahiti)

=== Final ===
24 February 1973

New Zealand	2–0	Tahiti
David Taylor (?); Alan Marley (?)

Newmarket Park, Auckland
Referee: B. Chaudet (New Hebrides)

== 1980 Oceania Cup ==
The second edition of the OFC Nations Cup, held in New Caledonia, consisted of eight teams divided into two groups of four, with the group winners progressing to the final and the runners-up contesting the third place play-off match. After three group matches, New Zealand failed to progress to the knockout stages of the tournament.

=== Group A ===
Team	Pld	W	D	L	GF	GA	GD	Pts	Qualification
Tahiti	3	3	0	0	21	5	+16	9	Advance to final
Fiji	3	2	0	1	10	7	+3	6	Advance to third place play-off
New Zealand	3	1	0	2	7	8	–1	3	
Solomon Islands	3	0	0	3	3	21	–18	0	

25 February 1980

Tahiti	3–1	New Zealand
Alfred Wabealo 61', 73'; Erroll Bennett 85'		Steve Sumner 47' (pen.)

Stade de Magenta, Noumea

27 February 1980

Fiji	4–0	New Zealand
D. Chand 10', 39'; M. Vuilabasa 31', 63'

Stade de Magenta, Noumea

29 February 1980

New Zealand	6–1	Solomon Islands
Michael Groom 6'; Mark Armstrong 16', 65', 69'; Bill de Graaf 24', 39'		Kasute'e 66'

Stade de Magenta, Noumea

== 1996 OFC Nations Cup ==
The third edition of the OFC Nations cup was not held as a cohesive tournament but consisted of four teams and two home-and-away rounds spanning two years. New Zealand played Australia, and Tahiti played the Solomon Islands, with Australia and Tahiti progressing to the final. The two matches between New Zealand and Australia also doubled as the 1995 edition of the Trans-Tasman Cup.

=== Semi-final ===
10 November 1995

New Zealand	0–0	Australia

Queen Elizabeth II Park, Christchurch
Attendance: 8,000
Referee: Barry Tasker (New Zealand)

15 November 1995

Australia	3–0	New Zealand
Damian Mori 33'; Paul Wade 45' (pen.); Joe Spiteri 51'

Breakers Stadium, Newcastle
Attendance: 8,858
Referee: Simon Micallef (Australia)

Australia won 3–0 on aggregate.

== 1998 OFC Nations Cup ==
Six teams competed in the 1998 OFC Nations Cup which was held at Suncorp Stadium in Brisbane, Australia. The six teams were divided into two groups of three, with the top two teams from each group progressing to the semi-finals. New Zealand defeated Australia in the final to earn a spot at the 1999 FIFA Confederations Cup.

=== Group A ===
Team	Pld	W	D	L	GF	GA	GD	Pts	Qualification
New Zealand	2	2	0	0	9	1	+8	6	Advance to knockout stage
Tahiti	2	1	0	1	5	2	+3	3	Advance to knockout stage
Vanuatu	2	0	0	2	2	13	–11	0	

25 September 1998

New Zealand	1–0	Tahiti
Paama 13' (o.g.)

Lang Park, Brisbane
Attendance: 900
Referee: Simon Micallef (Australia)

28 September 1998

New Zealand	8–1	Vanuatu
Christie 1'; Coveny 11', 25', 39', 40'; Ryan 34', 65'; Bunce 65'		Roronamahava 45'

Lang Park, Brisbane
Attendance: 500
Referee: Intaz Shah (Fiji)

=== Semi-final ===
2 October 1998

New Zealand	1–0	Fiji
Hay 88'

Lang Park, Brisbane
Attendance: 1,200
Referee: Massimo Raveino (Tahiti)

=== Final ===
4 October 1998

New Zealand	1–0	Australia
Burton 24'

Lang Park, Brisbane
Attendance: 12,000
Referee: Massimo Raveino (Tahiti)

== 2000 OFC Nations Cup ==
As in the previous edition of the Nations Cup, the 2000 tournament included six teams divided into two groups of three. The top two teams from each group progressed to the knockout stages with Australia defeating New Zealand in the final to claim the title of Oceania champion, and secure a place at the 2001 FIFA Confederations Cup.

=== Group B ===
Team	Pld	W	D	L	GF	GA	GD	Pts	Qualification
New Zealand	2	2	0	0	5	1	+4	6	Advance to knockout stage
Vanuatu	2	1	0	1	4	5	–1	3	Advance to knockout stage
Tahiti	2	0	0	2	2	5	–3	0	

19 Jun 2000

New Zealand	2–0	Tahiti
Kris Bouckenooghe 27'; Chris Jackson 78'

Stade Pater, Papeete
Attendance: 1,000

21 Jun 2000

New Zealand	3–1	Vanuatu
Chris Killen 47', 84'; Jonathan Perry 56'		Richard Iwai 14'

Stade Pater, Papeete
Attendance: 500

=== Semi-final ===
25 Jun 2000

New Zealand	2–0	Solomon Islands
Simon Elliott 51', 55'

Stade Pater, Papeete
Attendance: 500

=== Final ===
28 Jun 2000

Australia	2–0	New Zealand
Shaun Murphy 40'; Craig Foster 66'

Stade Pater, Papeete
Attendance: 300
Referee: Harry Attison (Vanuatu)

== 2002 OFC Nations Cup ==
The sixth edition of the OFC Nations Cup saw eight teams participate in two groups of four teams each. Each team played the other once, and the top two teams progressed to the knockout stages. After defeating Vanuatu in the semi-final, New Zealand went on to defeat long-time rivals Australia to be crowned OFC Champions and qualify for the 2003 FIFA Confederations Cup.

=== Group B ===
Team	Pld	W	D	L	GF	GA	GD	Pts	Qualification
New Zealand	3	3	0	0	19	2	+17	9	Advance to knockout stage
Tahiti	3	2	0	1	6	7	–1	6	Advance to knockout stage
Solomon Islands	3	0	1	2	3	9	–6	1	
Papua New Guinea	3	0	1	2	2	12	–10	1	

5 July 2002

New Zealand	4–0	Tahiti
Nelsen 30'; Vicelich 49'; Urlovic 80'; Campbell 88'

North Harbour Stadium, Albany
Attendance: 1,000
Referee: Harry Attison (Vanuatu)

7 July 2002

New Zealand	9–1	Papua New Guinea
Killen 9', 10', 28', 51'; Campbell 27', 85'; Nelsen 54'; Burton 87'; De Gregorio 90+'		Aisa 35' (pen.)

North Harbour Stadium, Albany
Attendance: 1,000
Referee: Leone Rakaroi (Fiji)

9 July 2002

New Zealand	6–1	Solomon Islands
Vicelich 28', 45'; Urlovic 42'; Campbell 50', 75'; Burton 88'		Fa'arodo 73'

North Harbour Stadium, Albany
Attendance: 1,000
Referee: Harry Attison (Vanuatu)

=== Semi-final ===
12 July 2002

New Zealand	3–0	Vanuatu
Burton 13', 65'; Killen 23'

Ericsson Stadium, Auckland
Attendance: 1,000
Referee: Matthew Breeze (Australia)

=== Final ===
14 July 2002

New Zealand	1–0	Australia
Nelsen 78'

Ericsson Stadium, Auckland
Attendance: 4,000
Referee: Charles Ariiotima (Tahiti)

== 2004 OFC Nations Cup ==
The 2004 OFC Nations Cup - which doubled as FIFA World Cup qualifying for the Oceania region - consisted of two rounds. The first round saw six nations compete in a single group where each team played the other once. The top two teams progressed to a home-and-away finals series to determine the winner of the Nations Cup.

Due to a shock 4–2 loss to Vanuatu, New Zealand failed to place in the top two, resulting in Australia taking on the Solomon Islands in the two-legged final, eventually winning 5–1 away and 6–0 at home to claim the title of OFC Champions for a fourth time.

=== Group stage ===
Pos	Team	Pld	W	D	L	GF	GA	GD	Pts	Qualification	Australia men's national soccer team	Solomon Islands national football team	New Zealand men's national football team	Fiji national football team	Tahiti national football team	Vanuatu national football team
1	Australia	5	4	1	0	21	3	+18	13	Advance to final	—	—	1–0	6–1	9–0	—
2	Solomon Islands	5	3	1	1	9	6	+3	10	Advance to final	2–2	—	—	—	—	—
3	New Zealand	5	3	0	2	17	5	+12	9		—	3–0	—	—	10–0	—
4	Fiji	5	1	1	3	3	10	−7	4		—	1–2	0–2	—	—	1–0
5	Tahiti	5	1	1	3	2	24	−22	4		—	0–4	—	0–0	—	2–1
6	Vanuatu	5	1	0	4	5	9	−4	3		0–3	0–1	4–2	—	—	—

Rules for classification: Tiebreakers
29 May 2004

Australia	1–0	New Zealand
Bresciano 40'

Hindmarsh Stadium, Adelaide
Attendance: 12,130
Referee: Claus Bo Larsen (Denmark)

31 May 2004

New Zealand	3–0	Solomon Islands
Fisher 36'; Oughton 81'; Lines 90'

Marden Sports Complex, Adelaide
Attendance: 217
Referee: Eduardo Iturralde González (Spain)

2 June 2004

Vanuatu	4–2	New Zealand
Chilia 37'; Bibi 64'; Maleb 72'; Qorig 88'		Coveny 61', 75'

Hindmarsh Stadium, Adelaide
Attendance: 356
Referee: Stefano Farina (Italy)

4 June 2004

New Zealand	10–0	Tahiti
Coveny 6', 38', 45'; Fisher 16', 22', 63'; Jones 72'; Oughton 74'; Nelsen 82', 87'

Marden Sports Complex, Adelaide
Attendance: 200
Referee: Mark Shield (Australia)

6 June 2004

Fiji	0–2	New Zealand
		Bunce 8'; Coveny 56'

Hindmarsh Stadium, Adelaide
Attendance: 2,000
Referee: Claus Bo Larsen (Denmark)

== 2008 OFC Nations Cup ==
The 2008 tournament doubled as FIFA World Cup qualification matches for the Oceania region and consisted of just four teams in one group with matches spread out over two years. Each team played the other twice with New Zealand - the top team of the group - being crowned the OFC Nations Cup champions as well as earning a spot in the play-off match against the 5th best Asian team for a spot at the 2010 FIFA World Cup in South Africa.

Pos	Team	Pld	W	D	L	GF	GA	GD	Pts	Qualification	(New Zealand)	(New Caledonia)	(Fiji)	(Vanuatu)
1	New Zealand (C)	6	5	0	1	14	5	+9	15	Advance to inter-confederation play-offs	—	3–0	0–2	4–1
2	New Caledonia	6	2	2	2	12	10	+2	8		1–3	—	4–0	3–0
3	Fiji	6	2	1	3	8	11	−3	7		0–2	3–3	—	2–0
4	Vanuatu	6	1	1	4	5	13	−8	4		1–2	1–1	2–1	—

Legend: Blue = home team win; Yellow = draw; Red = away team win.
(C) Champions
17 October 2007
16:00 UTC+12

Fiji	0–2	New Zealand
	Report	Vicelich 37'; Smeltz 86'

Churchill Park, Lautoka
Attendance: 6,000
Referee: Jair Marrufo (USA)

17 November 2007
14:00 UTC+11

Vanuatu	1–2	New Zealand
Naprapol 32'	Report	Smeltz 53'; Mulligan 90+3'

Korman Stadium, Port Vila
Attendance: 8,000
Referee: Job Minan (Papua New Guinea)

21 November 2007
19:00 UTC+13

New Zealand	4–1	Vanuatu
Mulligan 17', 81'; Smeltz 29' (pen.), 34'	Report	Sakama 50'

Westpac Stadium, Wellington
Attendance: 2,500
Referee: Averii Jacques (Tahiti)

6 September 2008
17:00 UTC+11

New Caledonia	1–3	New Zealand
M. Hmaé 55'	Report	Sigmund 16'; Smeltz 65', 75'

Stade Numa-Daly Magenta, Noumea
Attendance: 2,589
Referee: Rakesh Varman (Fiji)

10 September 2008
19:30 UTC+12

New Zealand	3–0	New Caledonia
Smeltz 49', 76'; Christie 69'	Report

North Harbour Stadium, Auckland
Attendance: 8,000
Referee: Norbert Hauata (Tahiti)

19 November 2008
18:00 UTC+12

New Zealand	0–2	Fiji
	Report	Krishna 63', 90'

Churchill Park, Lautoka (Fiji)
(Note: The New Zealand vs Fiji match was originally scheduled for 13 October 2007, but was postponed by FIFA after Fijian goalkeeper Simione Tamanisau was denied a visa by the New Zealand immigration authorities. The match was first rescheduled to be played in the neutral country of Samoa, but subsequently moved again to Fiji.)
Attendance: 4,500
Referee: Lencie Fred (Vanuatu)

== 2012 OFC Nations Cup ==
The ninth edition of the OFC Nations Cup was held in Honiara, Solomon Islands with eight teams in the competition. The teams were divided into two groups of four, each playing the other teams once. The top two teams of each group progressed to the knockout stages which consisted of semi-finals a final round to determine the winner of the OFC Nations Cup.

Tahiti won the competition for the first time in its history after tournament favourites New Zealand lost to New Caledonia in the semi-final. Tahiti's triumph was also the first time a nation other than Australia or New Zealand has won the OFC Nations Cup.

The group stage of the 2012 Nations Cup also doubled as World Cup qualifying matches, with the top two teams from each group progressing to stage 3 of qualifying. The winner of the 2012 Nations Cup would also represent Oceania at the 2013 FIFA Confederations Cup.

=== Group B ===
Pos	Team	Pld	W	D	L	GF	GA	GD	Pts	Qualification	New Zealand men's national football team	Solomon Islands national football team	Fiji national football team	Papua New Guinea national soccer team
1	New Zealand	3	2	1	0	4	2	+2	7	Semi-finals and World Cup qualifying third round	—	1–1	—	2–1
2	Solomon Islands	3	1	2	0	2	1	+1	5	Semi-finals and World Cup qualifying third round	—	—	—	—
3	Fiji	3	0	2	1	1	2	−1	2		0–1	0–0	—	1–1
4	Papua New Guinea	3	0	1	2	2	4	−2	1		—	0–1	—	—

2 June 2012
12:00 UTC+11

Fiji	0–1	New Zealand
		Smith 11'

Lawson Tama Stadium, Honiara
Attendance: 15,000
Referee: Isidore Assiene-Ambassa (New Caledonia)

4 June 2012
12:00 UTC+11

Papua New Guinea	1–2	New Zealand
Hans 89' (pen.)		Smeltz 2'; Wood 52'

Lawson Tama Stadium, Honiara
Attendance: 3,000
Referee: Bruce George (Vanuatu)

6 June 2012
15:00 UTC+11

New Zealand	1–1	Solomon Islands
Wood 13'		Totori 56'

Lawson Tama Stadium, Honiara
Attendance: 18,000
Referee: Norbert Hauata (Tahiti)

=== Semi-final ===
8 June 2012
15:00 UTC+11

New Zealand	0–2	New Caledonia
		Kaï 60'; Gope-Fenepej 90+3'

Lawson Tama Stadium, Honiara
Attendance: 10,000
Referee: Norbert Hauata (Tahiti)

=== Third place match ===
10 June 2012
11:00 UTC+11

Solomon Islands	3–4	New Zealand
Teleda 48'; Totori 54', 87'		Wood 10', 24', 29'; Smeltz 90'

Lawson Tama Stadium, Honiara
Attendance: 15,000
Referee: Kader Zitouni (Tahiti)

== 2016 OFC Nations Cup ==
=== Group B ===
Pos	Team	Pld	W	D	L	GF	GA	GD	Pts	Qualification
1	New Zealand	3	3	0	0	9	1	+8	9	Qualification to Nations Cup knockout stage and World Cup qualifying third round
2	Solomon Islands	3	1	0	2	1	2	−1	3	Qualification to Nations Cup knockout stage and World Cup qualifying third round
3	Fiji	3	1	0	2	4	6	−2	3	Qualification to World Cup qualifying third round
4	Vanuatu	3	1	0	2	3	8	−5	3	

Source: FIFA
Rules for classification: Qualification tiebreakers
28 May 2016
16:00

New Zealand	3–1	Fiji
Tzimopoulos 16'; Fallon 41'; Wood 61' (pen.)	Report (FIFA); Report (OFC)	Krishna 45+2' (pen.)

Sir John Guise Stadium, Port Moresby
Attendance: 378
Referee: Norbert Hauata (Tahiti)

31 May 2016
16:00

Vanuatu	0–5	New Zealand
	Report (FIFA); Report (OFC)	Wood 4', 5'; McGlinchey 10'; Fallon 19'; Barbarouses 45'

Sir John Guise Stadium, Port Moresby
Attendance: 520
Referee: Amos Anio (Papua New Guinea)

4 June 2016
19:00

New Zealand	1–0	Solomon Islands
Adams 80'	Report (FIFA); Report (OFC)

Sir John Guise Stadium, Port Moresby
Attendance: 1,925
Referee: Norbert Hauata (Tahiti)

=== Semi-final ===
8 June 2016
16:10

New Zealand	1–0	New Caledonia
Wood 49'	Report (FIFA); Report (OFC)

Sir John Guise Stadium, Port Moresby
Attendance: 1,379
Referee: Kader Zitouni (Tahiti)

=== Final ===
11 June 2016
16:00

New Zealand	0–0 (a.e.t.)	Papua New Guinea
	Report (FIFA); Report (OFC)
Penalties
Fallon (penalty scored); McGlinchey (penalty scored); Dyer (penalty scored); Brockie (penalty missed); Rojas (penalty scored)	4–2	(penalty missed) Upaiga; (penalty scored) Semmy; (penalty scored) Foster; (penalty missed) Gunemba

Sir John Guise Stadium, Port Moresby
Attendance: 13,000
Referee: Norbert Hauata (Tahiti)

== 2024 OFC Nations Cup ==
=== Group A ===
Pos	Team	Pld	W	D	L	GF	GA	GD	Pts	Qualification
1	New Zealand	2	2	0	0	7	0	+7	6	Advance to knockout stage
2	Vanuatu (H)	2	1	0	1	1	4	−3	3	Advance to knockout stage
3	Solomon Islands	2	0	0	2	0	4	−4	0	
4	New Caledonia	0	0	0	0	0	0	0	0	Withdrew

Source: OFC
Rules for classification: Group stage tiebreakers
(H) Hosts
15 June 2024
12:00

New Zealand	Cancelled	New Caledonia

VFF Freshwater Stadium, Port Vila

18 June 2024
15:00

New Zealand	3–0	Solomon Islands
Waine 6', 11'; Barbarouses 45+4'	Report

VFF Freshwater Stadium, Port Vila
Attendance: 3,000
Referee: David Yareboinen (Papua New Guinea)

21 June 2024
15:00

Vanuatu	0–4	New Zealand
	Report	Mata 10'; Kaltak 27' (o.g.); Just 63'; Old 78'

VFF Freshwater Stadium, Port Vila
Attendance: 7,200
Referee: Veer Singh (Fiji)

=== Knockout stage ===
==== Semi-finals ====
27 June 2024
11:00

New Zealand	5–0	Tahiti
Surman 7'; Waine 45', 53'; Barbarouses 45+3', 72'	Report

VFF Freshwater Stadium, Port Vila
Attendance: 2,000
Referee: Veer Singh (Fiji)

==== Final ====
30 June 2024
15:00

New Zealand	3–0	Vanuatu
Howieson 2'; Randall 83'; Mata 90+1'	Report

VFF Freshwater Stadium, Port Vila
Attendance: 10,000
Referee: Ben Aukwai (Solomon Islands)

== Statistics ==
=== Record players ===
Rank	Player	Matches	Tournaments
1	Ivan Vicelich	20	1998, 2000, 2004, 2008 and 2012
2	Simon Elliott	12	1996, 2000, 2004 and 2008
2	Chris Killen	12	2000, 2002, 2008 and 2012
4	Vaughan Coveny	11	1996, 1998 and 2004
4	Shane Smeltz	11	2004, 2008 and 2012
6	Chris Wood	8	2012 and 2016

=== Top goalscorers ===
Rank	Player	Goals	Tournaments (goals)
1	Shane Smeltz	10	2004 (0), 2008 (8) and 2012 (2)
1	Vaughan Coveny	10	1996 (0), 1998 (4), 2002 (0) and 2004 (6)
3	Chris Wood	9	2012 (5) and 2016 (4)
4	Chris Killen	7	2000 (2), 2002 (5), 2004 (0), 2008 (0) and 2012 (0)

== See also ==
- New Zealand national football team results
- New Zealand at the FIFA World Cup
- New Zealand at the FIFA Confederations Cup
