= 1973 Oceania Cup final =

- Event: 1973 Oceania Cup
New Zealand	Tahiti
2	0
- Date: 24 February 1973
- Venue: Newmarket Park, Auckland
- Referee: B. Chaudet (New Hebrides)

The 1973 Oceania Cup final was a football match that took place on 24 February 1973 to determine the winners of the 1973 Oceania Cup. It was the final of the first Oceania Cup, a tournament contested by the senior men's national teams of the member associations of OFC to decide the champions of Oceania.

New Zealand won their inaugural Oceania Cup, beating Tahiti 2–0. New Zealand's Dave Taylor opened the scoring before Alan Marley scored their second to clinch the title.

== Match ==
=== Details ===
24 February 1973

New Zealand	2–0	Tahiti
Taylor; Marley	Report

Newmarket Park, Auckland
Referee: B. Chaudet (New Hebrides)

Kevin Curtain
Maurice Tillotson
Ron Armstrong
Colin Latimo
John Staines
Dennis Tindall (substituted off)
David Taylor
Brian Turner
Alan Marley
Alan Vest
Malcolm Bland
Substitutions:
Brian Armstrong (substituted on)
Manager:
Barrie Truman

Georges Piehi
Gérard Kautai
Joseph Burns
Alexis Tumahai
Charles Temarii
Terii Etaeta
William Aumeran (substituted off)
Mana Temaiana
Lewis Lai San
Erroll Bennett
Harold Ng Fok (substituted off)
Substitutions:
Gilles Malinowski (substituted on)
Claude Carrara (substituted on)
Manager:
F. Vernaudon
