= 1972 Chatham Cup =

Tournament details
- Venue(s): Basin Reserve, Wellington; First replay: English Park, Christchurch; Second replay: Newmarket Park, Auckland
- Dates: 2 September 1972 (first replay 9 September, second replay 23 September)

Final positions
- Champions: Christchurch United (1st title)
- Runners-up: Mount Wellington

The 1972 Chatham Cup was the 45th annual nationwide knockout football competition in New Zealand.

Early stages of the competition were run on a regional basis, with the National League teams receiving a bye until the later stages of the competition. In all, 99 teams took part in the competition. Different sources give different numberings for the rounds of the competition: some start round one with the beginning of the regional qualifications; others start numbering from the first national knock-out stage. The former numbering scheme is used in this article.

The final saw the end of a Chatham Cup era, being the last final to be held at the Basin Reserve until 1980. The Basin Reserve had been the host of every final since 1928.

== The 1972 final ==
The 1972 final was a marathon effort, unprecedented and unequalled in Chatham Cup history. In the days before penalty shoot-outs replays were played if scores were level after extra time. The 1972 final required not one, but two replays, with the first of these being held in Christchurch (the first time that city had been host to a final match). The total aggregate of 13 goals across the three matches was a record for a final - indeed the eight goals in the first match equalled the previous record. In the first match, Christchurch United's Graham Dacombe became the first player to score four goals in one final since John Donovan in 1958. All three matches were refereed by R.W. Harries.

The first match was played in typical windy conditions at Wellington. United played with the wind in the first spell and should have had the lead early on when Mount keeper Kevin Curtin appeared to step back across his goal-line when holding onto a Vic Pollard cross. The referee turned down their appeal and the goal was not given. United were soon to gain the lead, however, with the first of Dacombe's four strikes. Two goals from penalties for the Mount, both taken by Ron Armstrong, followed before Dacombe restored the balance. In the second half Brian Turner put Mount Wellington into the lead for a second time, only for Dacombe to again level before the final whistle. In extra time it was United who took the lead for a second occasion, and it required a late Earle Thomas equaliser to send the tie to a second game.

The second match was played on Christchurch United's territory at English Park, the first time a final had ever been played outsider the North Island. Compared with the first match it was a dour game, with only one goal a piece and nowhere near the first tie's excitement. Dennis Tindall opened the scoring for Mount Wellington, and the only other goal of the game was the equaliser from Ian Park.

The third bout took place at Mount Wellington's Newmarket Park ground, and finally it produced a result. Alan Park opened the scoring for United before the interval, followed in the second spell by Alan Marley. Armstrong pulled one back — again from the penalty spot — but that was the last of the scoring. There were vociferous protest from the Mount when substitute Dave Taylor had a late effort disallowed, but in the minds of many this was poetic justice for Pollard's denied effort in the first match.

== Results ==
=== Third Round ===
Birkenhead United	2 – 0	East Coast Bays

Brooklyn Northern United	3 – 2	Petone

Claudelands Rovers	3 – 2	Cambridge

Grosvenor Rovers (Marlborough)	1 – 6	Nelson United

Hamilton	7 – 1	Huntly Thistle

Leopard United (Hastings)	4 – 2	Napier City

Kiwi United (Palmerston North)	2 – 1	Palmerston City (Palmerston North)

Metro College (Auckland)	3 – 0	Takapuna City

Moturoa	4 – 1	New Plymouth Old Boys

Northern (Dunedin)	4 – 2	Mosgiel

North Shore United	4 – 1	Ellerslie

Papakura City	1 – 0	Courier Rangers

Queens Park (Invercargill)	1 – 1*	Invercargill United

Roslyn-Wakari	2 – 1	Dunedin City

Seatoun	3 – 2	Lower Hutt City

Shamrock (Christchurch)	4 – 4*	Christchurch Rangers

Timaru City	4 – 0	Canterbury University

Waterside (Wellington)	2 – 1	Naenae

Western Suburbs FC (Porirua)	7 – 1	Karori Swifts

* Won on penalties by Queens Park (4–3) and Rangers (6–5)

=== Fourth Round ===
Blockhouse Bay	1 – 4	Mount Wellington

Christchurch Rangers	1 – 3	Christchurch United

Claudelands Rovers	4 – 1	Affco Rangers (Ngaruawahia)

Eastern Suburbs (Auckland)	6 – 1	Metro College

Gisborne City	7 – 1	Leopard United

Hamilton	1 – 0	Whangarei

Kiwi United	7 – 2	Douglas Villa (Masterton)

Moturoa	1 – 0	Western Suburbs FC

Nelson United	1 – 0	Wellington City

North Shore United	2 – 1	Birkenhead United

Papakura City	0 – 2	Auckland City

Queens Park	4 – 1	Northern

Roslyn-Wakari	0 – 3	Caversham

Seatoun	3 – 2	Brooklyn Northern United

Timaru City	0 – 2	New Brighton

Waterside	2 – 0	Stop Out (Lower Hutt)

=== Fifth Round ===
Auckland City	0 – 1	Eastern Suburbs

Christchurch United	5 – 1	New Brighton

Claudelands Rovers	0 – 2	North Shore United

Moturoa	0 – 4	Gisborne City

Mount Wellington	2 – 0	Hamilton

Nelson United	4 – 0	Kiwi United

Queens Park	2 – 3	Caversham

Waterside	2 – 0	Seatoun

=== Quarter-finals ===
Caversham	0 – 7	Mount Wellington

Christchurch United	4 – 2	Gisborne City

Eastern Suburbs	3 – 1	North Shore United

Waterside	3 – 1	Nelson United

=== Semi-finals ===
Eastern Suburbs	3 – 5	Christchurch United

Waterside	1 – 5	Mount Wellington

=== Final ===
2 September 1972

Christchurch United	4 – 4 (aet)	Mount Wellington
Dacombe ×4		R. Armstrong 2 (2 pens.), Turner, Thomas

Basin Reserve, Wellington
Referee: R.W. Harries

==== Replays ====
9 September 1972

Christchurch United	1 – 1 (aet)	Mount Wellington
I. Park		Tindall

English Park, Christchurch
Referee: R.W. Harries
23 September 1972

Christchurch United	2 – 1	Mount Wellington
A. Park, Marley		Armstrong (pen.)

Newmarket Park, Auckland
Referee: R.W. Harries
