= Charles Temarii =

Tahitian footballer (1946–2015)

Personal information
- Full name: Charles Amihare A. Temarii
- Date of birth: 8 April 1946
- Place of birth: Papeete, Tahiti, French Polynesia
- Date of death: 14 September 2015 (aged 69)
- Position: Defender

Youth career
- –1965: AS Pirae

Senior career*
Years	Team	Apps	(Gls)
1965–1970	AS Pirae		
1970–1974	AS Central Sport		
1974–1975	AS Pirae		

International career
1973	Tahiti	5	(0)
- * Club domestic league appearances and goals

Charles Amihare A. Temarii (8 April 1946 – 14 September 2015) was a Tahitian footballer who played as a defender.

== Career ==
Temarii started his football career in the junior team of AS Pirae. In 1970, he joined for AS Central Sport, before returning to Pirae in 1974. During the early 1970s, West German clubs Bayern Munich and Hertha BSC were interested in signing him, but he chose to stay in Tahiti. During his career, he was nicknamed "Coco".

He made five appearances for the Tahiti national team at the 1973 Oceania Cup, including in the final, where Tahiti lost 2–0 to New Zealand.

Additionally, Temarii served as the honorary president of the Tahitian Football Federation.

== Personal life and death ==
Temarii was married, and had six children. He also had five siblings, including three sisters and two brothers. Prior to his death, Temarii served as the deputy mayor of Paparā under Bruno Sandras.

In March 2015, Temarii was diagnosed with esophageal cancer. He died on 14 September 2015, at the age of 69.
