= New Zealand at the FIFA Confederations Cup =

Football tournament results

The New Zealand national football team represented New Zealand at the FIFA Confederations Cup on four occasions, in 1999, 2003, 2009 and 2017.

== Record at the FIFA Confederations Cup ==
FIFA Confederations Cup record
Year	Host	Round	Pld	W	D*	L	GF	GA	Squad
1992	Saudi Arabia	No OFC representative invited							
1995	Saudi Arabia	No OFC representative invited							
1997	Saudi Arabia	Did not qualify							
1999	Mexico	Group stage	3	0	0	3	1	6	Squad
2001	South Korea; Japan	Did not qualify							
2003	France	Group stage	3	0	0	3	1	11	Squad
2005	Germany	Did not qualify							
2009	South Africa	Group stage	3	0	1	2	0	7	Squad
2013	Brazil	Did not qualify							
2017	Russia	Group stage	3	0	0	3	1	8	Squad
Total		Group stage	12	0	1	11	3	32	—

== 1999 FIFA Confederations Cup ==
=== Group B ===
Team	Pld	W	D	L	GF	GA	GD	Pts
Brazil	3	3	0	0	7	0	7	9
United States	3	2	0	1	4	2	2	6
Germany	3	1	0	2	2	6	−4	3
New Zealand	3	0	0	3	1	6	−5	0

24 July 1999
14:30 CDT

New Zealand	1 – 2	United States
Zoricich 90+3'	(Report)	25' McBride; 58' Kirovski

Estadio Jalisco, Guadalajara
Attendance: 60,000
Referee: (Paraguay) Ubaldo Aquino

28 July 1999
18:00 CDT

Germany	2 – 0	New Zealand
Preetz 6'; Matthäus 33'	(Report)

Estadio Jalisco, Guadalajara
Attendance: 42,000
Referee: (Benin) Coffi Codjia

30 July 1999
20:30 CDT

New Zealand	0 – 2	Brazil
	(Report)	45+2' Marcos Paulo; 88' Ronaldinho

Estadio Jalisco, Guadalajara
Attendance: 53,000
Referee: (South Korea) Kim Young-Joo

== 2003 FIFA Confederations Cup ==
=== Group A ===
Team	Pld	W	D	L	GF	GA	GD	Pts
France	3	3	0	0	8	1	7	9
Colombia	3	2	0	1	4	2	2	6
Japan	3	1	0	2	4	3	1	3
New Zealand	3	0	0	3	1	11	−10	0

18 June 2003
18:00 CEST

New Zealand	0 – 3	Japan
	(Report)	12', 75' Nakamura; 65' Nakata

Stade de France, Saint-Denis
Attendance: 36,038
Referee: (Benin) Coffi Codjia

20 June 2003
19:00 CEST

Colombia	3 – 1	New Zealand
López 58'; Yepes 75'; Hernández 85'	(Report)	27' de Gregorio

Stade de Gerland, Lyon
Attendance: 22,811
Referee: (Guatemala) Carlos Batres

22 June 2003
21:00 CEST

France	5 – 0	New Zealand
Kapo 17'; Henry 20'; Cissé 71'; Giuly 90+1'; Pires 90+3'	(Report)

Stade de France, Saint-Denis
Attendance: 36,842
Referee: (Iran) Masoud Moradi

== 2009 FIFA Confederations Cup ==
=== Group A ===
Team	Pld	W	D	L	GF	GA	GD	Pts
Spain	3	3	0	0	8	0	+8	9
South Africa	3	1	1	1	2	2	0	4
Iraq	3	0	2	1	0	1	−1	2
New Zealand	3	0	1	2	0	7	−7	1

14 June 2009
20:30 SAST

New Zealand	0 – 5	Spain
	(Report)	6', 14', 17' Torres; 24' Fàbregas; 48' Villa

Royal Bafokeng Stadium, Rustenburg
Attendance: 21,649
Referee: (Benin) Coffi Codjia

17 June 2009
20:30 SAST

South Africa	2 – 0	New Zealand
Parker 21', 52'	(Report)

Royal Bafokeng Stadium, Rustenburg
Attendance: 36,598
Referee: (Mexico) Benito Archundia

20 June 2009
20:30 SAST

Iraq	0 – 0	New Zealand
	(Report)

Ellis Park, Johannesburg
Attendance: 23,295
Referee: (England) Howard Webb

== 2017 FIFA Confederations Cup ==
=== Group stage ===
Pos	Team	Pld	W	D	L	GF	GA	GD	Pts	Qualification
1	Portugal	3	2	1	0	7	2	+5	7	Advance to knockout stage
2	Mexico	3	2	1	0	6	4	+2	7	Advance to knockout stage
3	Russia (H)	3	1	0	2	3	3	0	3	
4	New Zealand	3	0	0	3	1	8	−7	0	

Source: FIFA
Rules for classification: Group stage tiebreakers
(H) Hosts
17 June 2017
18:00

Russia	2–0	New Zealand
Boxall 31' (o.g.); Smolov 69'	Report

Krestovsky Stadium, Saint Petersburg
Attendance: 50,251
Referee: Wilmar Roldán (Colombia)

21 June 2017
21:00

Mexico	2–1	New Zealand
Jiménez 54'; Peralta 72'	Report	Wood 42'

Fisht Olympic Stadium, Sochi
Attendance: 25,133
Referee: Bakary Gassama (Gambia)

24 June 2017
18:00

New Zealand	0–4	Portugal
	Report	Ronaldo 33' (pen.); B. Silva 37'; A. Silva 80'; Nani 90+1'

Krestovsky Stadium, Saint Petersburg
Attendance: 56,290
Referee: Mark Geiger (United States)

== Goalscorers ==
Player	Goals	1999	2003	2009	2017
Raf de Gregorio	1		1		
Chris Wood	1				1
Chris Zoricich	1	1			
Total	3	1	1	0	1

== See also ==
- New Zealand at the FIFA World Cup
- New Zealand at the OFC Nations Cup
