= Kevin Curtin =

New Zealand footballer

Personal information
- Full name: Kevin A Curtin
- Place of birth: New Zealand
- Position: Goalkeeper

Senior career*
Years	Team	Apps	(Gls)
- Courier Rangers
- Mount Wellington

International career
1972–1977	New Zealand	18	(0)
Medal record
Men's association football
Representing New Zealand
OFC Nations Cup
Winner	1973 New Zealand
- * Club domestic league appearances and goals

Kevin Curtin is an association football player who represented New Zealand at international level.

Curtin made his full All Whites debut with a substitute appearance in a 1–3 loss to Australia on 9 October 1972 and ended his international playing career with 18 A-international caps to his credit, his final cap a substitute appearance in a 1–1 draw, also against Australia on 30 March 1977.

== Honours ==
New Zealand

- OFC Nations Cup: 1973
