= Maurice Tillotson =

Association footballer (born 1944)

Personal information
- Date of birth: 20 January 1944 (age 82)
- Place of birth: Silsden, England
- Position: Defender

Senior career*
Years	Team	Apps	(Gls)
1962–1964	Huddersfield Town	0	(0)
1964	Toronto Italia		
1964–1966	Stockport County	35	(0)
1966–1970	Royal Antwerp	98	(0)
1971–1973	Gisborne City		
1973–1980	Stop Out		
1980–1981	Manurewa AFC		

International career
1972–1975	New Zealand	15	(1)

Managerial career
- 1974–1980: Stop Out FC (player-coach)
- 1982–1984: Manurewa FC (player-coach)
- 1986–1994: NZ National Youth
- 1994–1998: NZ National Women
- 2000–2003: Cook Islands FA (technical director)
- 2004–2009: NZ National Assoc (development coach)
- 2009–2011: Cook Islands FA (technical director)
Medal record
Men's association football
Representing New Zealand
OFC Nations Cup
Winner	1973 New Zealand
- * Club domestic league appearances and goals

Maurice Tillotson (born 20 January 1944) is a former association football player who represented New Zealand.

Born in Yorkshire, Tillotson signed as a full-time professional with Huddersfield Town at the age of seventeen. He also played in the English Football League with Stockport County, and had a short spell with Toronto Italia FC in the Eastern Canada Professional Soccer League. Tillotson then moved to Royal Antwerp of Belgium where he played in several European Cup games.

TiIlotson moved to New Zealand in 1971 and played three seasons for Gisborne City in the National League. During this time was selected for the national team and was voted New Zealand Player of the Year in 1973. He then moved to Stop Out Sports Club where he was player-coach of Stop Out's most successful National League side.

Tillotson made his full All Whites debut in a 4–1 win over New Caledonia on 17 September 1972 and ended his international playing career with 15 A-international caps and 1 goal to his credit, his final cap earned in a 1–1 draw with Macao on 5 November 1975.

== Honours ==
New Zealand

- OFC Nations Cup: 1973

Individual

- New Zealand Footballer of the Year: 1973
