= John Staines =

New Zealand footballer

Personal information
- Full name: John A Staines
- Place of birth: New Zealand

Senior career*
Years	Team	Apps	(Gls)
- Eastern Suburbs

International career
1968–1973	New Zealand	13	(0)
Medal record
Men's association football
Representing New Zealand
OFC Nations Cup
Winner	1973 New Zealand
- * Club domestic league appearances and goals

John Staines is an association football player who represented New Zealand at international level.

Staines made his full All Whites debut in a 5–0 win over Fiji on 17 September 1968 and ended his international playing career with 13 A-international caps to his credit, his final cap an appearance in a 0–4 loss to Iraq on 24 March 1973.

== Honours ==
New Zealand

- OFC Nations Cup: 1973
