= Barrie Truman =

New Zealand football manager

Personal information
- Date of birth: 1936 (age 89–90)
- Place of birth: Market Bosworth, Leicestershire

Managerial career
- Years: Team
- 1970–1976: New Zealand

Barrie Truman is a football (soccer) coach who managed the New Zealand national team. Truman first took charge of the New Zealand side in June 1970. New Zealand won 20, drew 13 and lost 16 of his 49 games in charge.

== Early life and education ==
Prior to being appointed as New Zealand coach, he was a member of The FA's staff Coach in 1967, having studied for a Diploma in Physical Education at Loughborough University and an Advanced Diploma at the University of Leicester. He emigrated from the United Kingdom to New Zealand in 1970. After emigrating he studied for a Masters diploma at Victoria University.

== Sporting career ==
He became Technical Director of the Oceania Football Confederation in 1986 for a short spell which lasted a year.

He became manager of the Sport-NZ Council of Recreation/Sport Hillary Commission 1981 and left the position in 1987. He was also President of Coaching NZ between 1981 and 1983.

He went on to become a Senior Lecturer in Physical Education at Wellington College of Education in 1987 where he stayed for 17 until years 2004

At the age of 65, he qualified as a "A" level UEFA Professional Coach in 2001.

He was named in the Wellington Hall of Fame in April 2011.

== Achievements ==
New Zealand national team

- OFC Nations Cup winner: 1973

Wellington United

- New Zealand National Soccer League winner: 1981, 1985

Miramar Rangers

- Chatham Cup winners: 1992
