= Guy Elmour =

New Caledonian football manager

Personal information
- Place of birth: New Caledonia
- Date of death: 5 June 2012
- Place of death: New Caledonia

Managerial career
- Years: Team
- 1971–1973: New Caledonia

Guy Elmour (died 5 June 2012) is a New Caledonian professional football manager.

== Career ==
From 1971 until 1973 Elmour coached the New Caledonia national football team. Starting in 1977 he worked over 25 year as the New Caledonian Football Federation President.

Guy Elmour died the 5th of June, 2012.
