= Geoff Brand =

New Zealand footballer

Personal information
- Full name: Geoff C Brand
- Date of birth: 14 May 1946 (age 80)
- Place of birth: England
- Height: 1.80 m (5 ft 11 in)
- Position: Striker

Senior career*
Years	Team	Apps	(Gls)
1970–1973	Stop Out		
Total			(4)

International career
1971–1973	New Zealand	11	(2)
Medal record
Men's association football
Representing New Zealand
OFC Nations Cup
Winner	1973 New Zealand
- * Club domestic league appearances and goals

Geoff Brand (born 14 May 1946) is a former association football player who represented New Zealand at international level.

Originally from Cambridgeshire he joined the Metropolitan Police Cadets in London on 3 May 1963. In 1966, aged 19 years, he played for the Metropolitan Police in the Metropolitan League which at that time included Arsenal, West Ham and Spurs Youth Teams. After turning down trials at West ham and Arsenal he left London, following his Kiwi fiancée Robyn, and joined the police in New Zealand until retirement in June 2001 at the rank of Inspector having served at Wellington, Lower Hutt, National H/Q's, Taumarunui, Tauranga, Auckland Central and South Auckland.

Brand scored on his full All Whites debut in a 2–4 loss to New Caledonia on 18 July 1971 and ended his international playing career with 11 A-international caps and 2 goals to his credit, his final cap an appearance in a 0–4 loss to Iraq on 24 March 1973 in the 1974 World Cup Qualifying Series in Australia. He was regarded as one of the best exponents of the central strikers role in the 4.3.3 system of play of that era.

== Honours ==
New Zealand

- OFC Nations Cup: 1973
