= Colin Latimour =

New Zealand footballer

Personal information
- Full name: Colin Wexford Latimour
- Date of birth: 11 December 1946
- Place of birth: Rangoon, British Burma
- Date of death: 24 December 2014 (aged 68)
- Position: Defender

Youth career
- Auckland Grammar School

Senior career*
Years	Team	Apps	(Gls)
1967–1969	Ponsonby AFC	23	
1970–1973	Eastern Suburbs AFC	68	(9)

International career
1967–1973	New Zealand	20	(1)
Medal record
Men's association football
Representing New Zealand
OFC Nations Cup
Winner	1973 New Zealand
- * Club domestic league appearances and goals

Colin Wexford Latimour (11 December 1946 – 24 December 2014) was an association football player who represented New Zealand at international level.

Latimour played for Auckland Grammar School first XI and was the teams vice captain. While playing for the school, he was selected for the Auckland under-21 side.

Latimour made his full All Whites début in a 3–5 loss to Australia on 5 November 1967 and ended his international playing career with 20 A-international caps to his credit, his final cap gained in a 0–4 loss to Iraq on 24 March 1973. Latimour scored a single international goal in a 2–1 win over New Caledonia on 21 February 1973.

Colin Latimour was New Zealand Soccer Player of the Year in 1967.

== Honours ==
New Zealand

- OFC Nations Cup: 1973
