= Dennis Tindall =

New Zealand footballer

Personal information
- Full name: Dennis Walter Tindall
- Position: Midfielder

Senior career*
Years	Team	Apps	(Gls)
- Dunedin Suburbs
- Mount Wellington
- Hamilton

International career
1971–1976	New Zealand	21	(5)
Medal record
Men's association football
Representing New Zealand
OFC Nations Cup
Winner	1973 New Zealand
- * Club domestic league appearances and goals

Dennis Walter Tindall is a former New Zealand soccer player who represented his country.

Tindall attended Nelson College in 1963. He made his full All Whites debut in a 2–4 loss to New Caledonia on 18 July 1971 and ended his international playing career with 21 A-international caps and 5 goals to his credit, his final cap also earned in a loss to New Caledonia, 1–2 on 2 October 1976.

== Honours ==
New Zealand

- OFC Nations Cup: 1973
