= Claude Carrara =

French footballer (born 1947)

Personal information
- Date of birth: 28 April 1947 (age 79)
- Place of birth: Fréjus, France
- Height: 1.71 m (5 ft 7 in)
- Position: Forward

Senior career*
Years	Team	Apps	(Gls)
1965–1969	Toulon	78	(10)
1969–1970	La Ciotat		
1970–1973	AS Central Sport		
1973–1974	AS Arue		
1974–1975	Mantes	9	(3)
1980–1981	Poissy		
1983–1984	Marly-Le-Roi		

International career
1973	Tahiti	5	(1)
Medal record
Men's association football
Representing Tahiti
OFC Nations Cup
Runner-up	1973 New Zealand
- * Club domestic league appearances and goals

Claude Carrara (born 28 April 1947) is a French former professional footballer who played as forward for the Tahiti national football team.

== Club career ==
Born in Fréjus, Carrara started his career with the Sporting Toulon Var, debuting in the first team with the club in 1965–66 French Division 2, achieving the fifth place. In the following season he finished seventh, following with a fifth place at the 1967–68 French Division 2, an identical result in the 1968–69 French Division 2, his last season with Toulon.

In the 1969–70 season of the Championnat de France amateur de football he signs with ES La Ciotat, in the third division, with which he achieves the promotion in the cadets division.

Between 1970 and 1973 he moved to French Polynesia, where he played in the local league becoming champion several times with AS Central Sport and then with JS Arue.

In 1974 he returned to play in the French second division for Mantes, relegated to the third division at the end of the season.

During the 1980-1981 season he played for AS Poissy, in the third division, achieving the sixth place of the northern group.

Carrara ends his career in 1983 with the Marly-le-Roy.

== International career ==
During his stay in French Polynesia he joined the Tahiti national football team, taking part to the 1973 OFC Nations Cup ed achieving the second place.

== Honours ==
Tahiti

- OFC Nations Cup: runner-up 1973
