= Malcolm Bland =

New Zealand footballer

Personal information
- Full name: Malcolm Bland
- Place of birth: England

Senior career*
Years	Team	Apps	(Gls)
?–1969	Gisborne City		
1970–post 1973	Eastern Suburbs		

International career
1969–1973	New Zealand	16	(2)
Medal record
Men's association football
Representing New Zealand
OFC Nations Cup
Winner	1973 New Zealand
- * Club domestic league appearances and goals

Malcolm Bland is an association football player who represented New Zealand at international level.

Bland made his full All Whites debut in a 0–0 draw with over New Caledonia on 25 July 1969 and ended his international playing career with 16 A-international caps and 2 goals to his credit, his final cap a substitute appearance in a 0–1 loss to Indonesia on 18 March 1973.

== Honours ==
New Zealand

- OFC Nations Cup: 1973
