= Alan Vest =

New Zealand football player and manager (1939–2025)

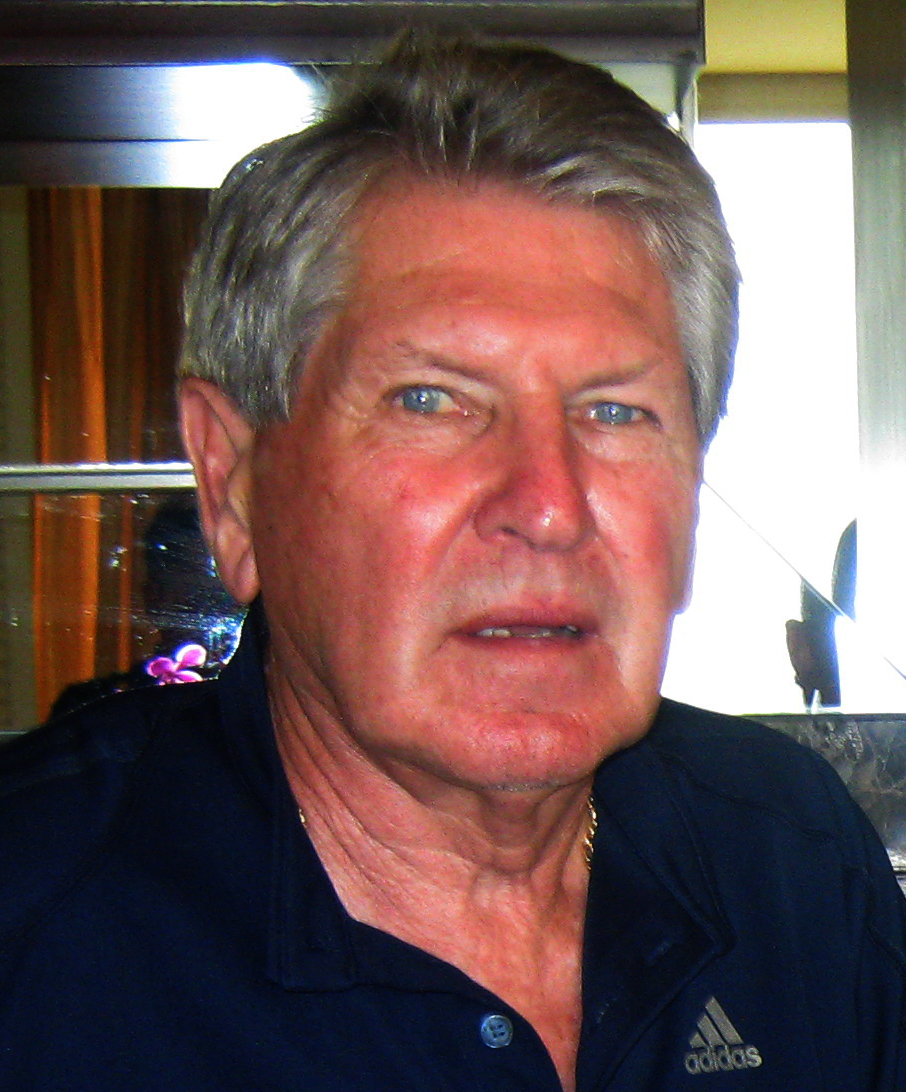
- Vest in 2013

Personal information
- Date of birth: 5 September 1939
- Place of birth: Barnsley, England
- Date of death: 30 October 2025 (aged 86)
- Position: Forward

Senior career*
Years	Team	Apps	(Gls)
1960–1961	Barnsley	0	(0)
1961–1962	King's Lynn		(1)
1962–1963	Boston United	19	(8)
1963–1965	Spalding United		
1965–?	Worksop Town		
- Rugby Town
?–1973	Gisborne City		
1974–1977	Perth Azzurri		
1978	Newcastle KB United	1	(0)

International career
1972–1973	New Zealand	17	(6)

Managerial career
- Rugby Town
- Rochdale AFC
- 1974: Western Australian Director of Coaching
- 1974–1975: New Brighton
- 1978–1981: Newcastle KB United
- 1982–1983: West Adelaide SC
- 1992–1998: Sarawak FA
- 1999–2000: Geylang United
- 2001–2005: Perth Glory (assistant)
- 2005–2006: Perth Glory (interim)
- 2006: Inglewood United
- 2009: ECU Joondalup
Medal record
Men's association football
Representing New Zealand
OFC Nations Cup
Winner	1973 New Zealand
- * Club domestic league appearances and goals

Alan Vest (5 September 1939 – 30 October 2025) was a professional football player and manager. Born in England, he made 17 appearances for the New Zealand national team, scoring six goals.

== Career ==
Vest scored on his full international debut for the New Zealand national team in a 4–1 win over New Caledonia on 17 September 1972 and ended his international playing career with 17 A-international caps and 6 goals to his credit, his final cap for the All Whites being in a 0–0 draw with Iran on 12 August 1973.

Vest first coached Rugby Town in the 1960s and then Rochdale AFC. It is in Australia where Vest has made his mark with the Yorkshireman coaching NSL teams when they were at their peak in the 1970s. After stints in New Zealand and in Perth as a director of coaching at the Football Federation of Western Australia. Vest spent time in Asia with Sarawak and Geylang United before returning to Australia.

== Death ==
Vest was from Barnsley, England. He resided in Perth, Australia in later life.

He died on 30 October 2025, at the age of 86.

== Honours ==
=== Player ===
New Zealand

- OFC Nations Cup: 1973

=== Manager ===
Sarawak FA

- Premier League: 1997
- FA Cup Malaysia: 1992
- Charity Shield Malaysia: 1998

Perth Glory

- National Soccer League: 2002–03, 2003–04
