= Alan Marley =

New Zealand footballer (1951–2025)

Personal information
- Full name: Alan Dennis Marley
- Date of birth: 8 March 1951
- Place of birth: Dover, Kent, England
- Date of death: 16 December 2025 (aged 74)
- Place of death: Brisbane, Queensland, Australia
- Position: Forward

Senior career*
Years	Team	Apps	(Gls)
- New Brighton
- Arsenal Apprentice
- Crewe Alexandra
- Dover Athletic
- New Brighton
- Christchurch United
1978	Brisbane City	20	(6)
- St George-Souths
- Dover Athletic

International career
1972–1973	New Zealand	12	(3)
Medal record
Men's association football
Representing New Zealand
OFC Nations Cup
Winner	1973 New Zealand
- * Club domestic league appearances and goals

Alan Dennis Marley (8 March 1951 – 16 December 2025) was an association football player who played as a forward. Born in England, he represented New Zealand.

== Career ==
Marley made his full All Whites debut in a 4–1 win over New Caledonia on 17 September 1972 and ended his international playing career with 12 A-international caps and 3 goals to his credit, his final cap in a 2–0 loss to Iraq on 13 March 1973. Marley only missed one A-international game between debut and his last selection and scored in three successive games in a four-day period in February 1973. Marley finished his playing days with the successful Brisbane Premier League side North Star FC. Before a falling-out with the North Star coach saw him sign for Mt.Gravatt Hawks, which was coached by Marley's former Qld State teammate Ian Steele for the remainder of the 1986 season.

== Style of play ==
Marley was an inside forward.

== Death ==
On 16 December 2025, Marley died in Brisbane, Queensland, Australia following a lengthy illness. He was 74.

== Honours ==
New Zealand

- OFC Nations Cup: 1973
