= Dave Taylor (New Zealand footballer) =

New Zealand footballer

Personal information
- Full name: David Alexander Taylor

Senior career*
Years	Team	Apps	(Gls)
1967	Blockhouse Bay	?	(?)
1972–76	Mount Wellington	7	(2)
1977–79	Courier Rangers	?	(?)
1980–81	Mount Wellington		

International career
1967–1981	New Zealand	47	(10)
Medal record
Men's association football
Representing New Zealand
OFC Nations Cup
Winner	1973 New Zealand
- * Club domestic league appearances and goals

David Alexander Taylor was a successful New Zealand association football player who frequently represented his country with the All Whites.

Taylor represented the All Whites between 1967 and 1981, gaining 47 A-international caps, scoring 10 goals.

After his playing career finished Taylor continued his involvement in the game and in 1990 won the New Zealand Coach of the Year award.

== Honours ==
New Zealand

- OFC Nations Cup: 1973
