= Newmarket Park =

Park in Auckland, New Zealand

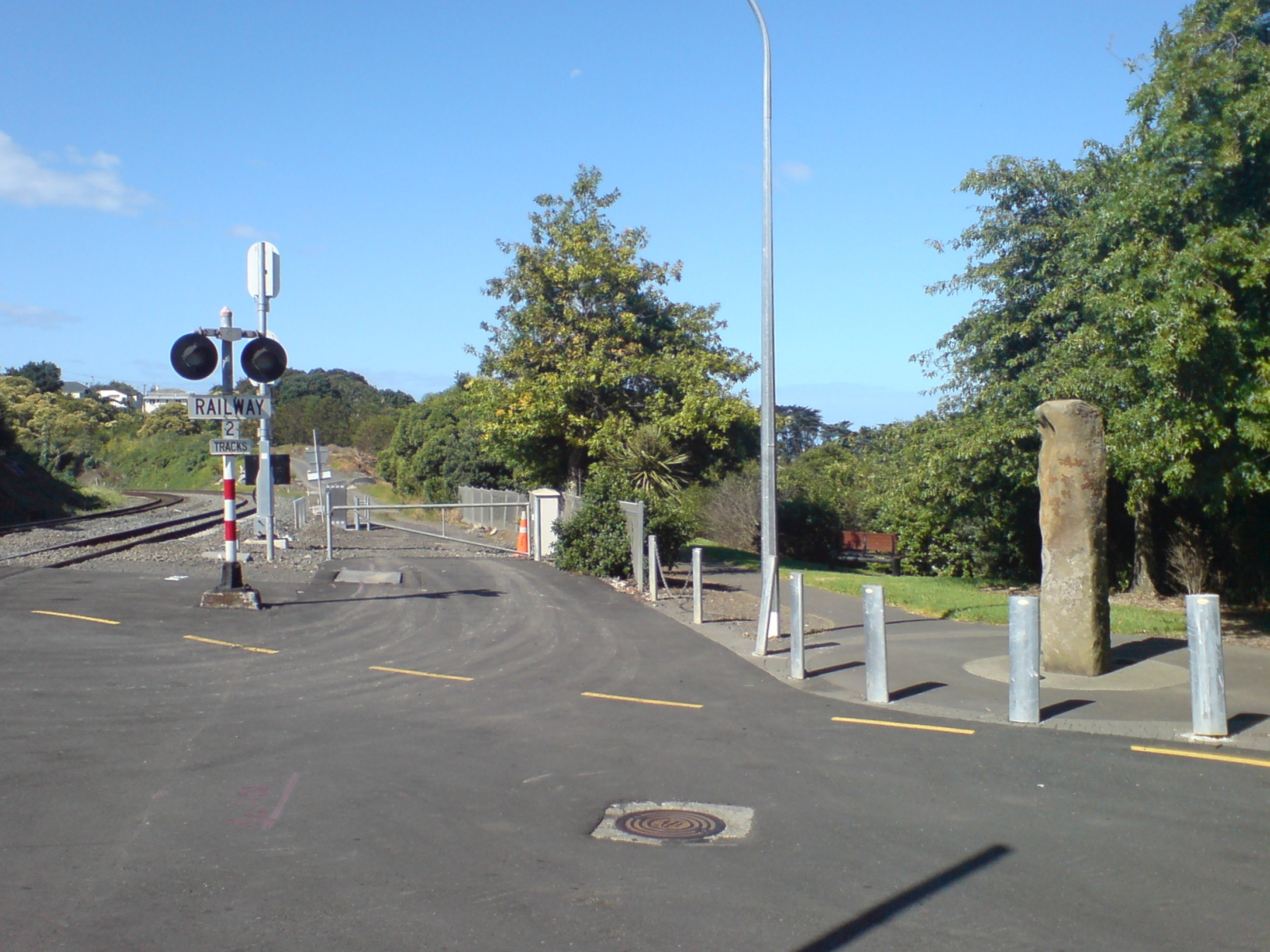
- The park's entrance in the west, off Sarawia Street
- Interactive map of Newmarket Park
- Location: Newmarket, Auckland
- Coordinates: 36.8646°S 174.7833°E
- Area: 6 ha
- Operator: Auckland Council

Newmarket Park is an approximately 6-hectare-large (15-acre) park in Auckland, New Zealand. It is located in the triangle between three suburbs, northeast of the Newmarket, southeast of Parnell and northwest of Remuera. It is located partially on a higher, man-made plateau, with the remainder of the park dropping steeply down towards Newmarket Stream running to Hobson Bay along the eastern edge of the park. In the early 2010s, a major remediation and upgrade of the park occurred.

== History ==
In the early European history of the area, the gully containing the park and the Slaughter House Creek (now Newmarket Stream) was used as a rubbish dump. In the 1930s, an employment scheme created a flat area on the higher western slope of the gully, approximately half-way up to the railway line. This initially served as an athletics track, and later for midget car racing and as a golf driving range. After being leased by the Auckland Football Association in 1962, it became the site of New Zealand's national soccer stadium, with many international games played here. However, in 1979 a large landslide occurred, which took away one of the grandstands and part of the playing field. After this, the park fell into disuse, with another large landslip also occurring in 1988.

In the late 1990s, a campaign was mounted by the Newmarket Park Protection Society (now Newmarket Protection Society), which eventually succeeded in ensuring the park was turned into a recreational park with a playground and decorative small lake - rather than being converted into one of many other proposals, which included a cultural theme park, Japanese cultural centre, a bowling green, botanical gardens, rugby fields, driving range or an artificial skifield.

=== Remediation works ===
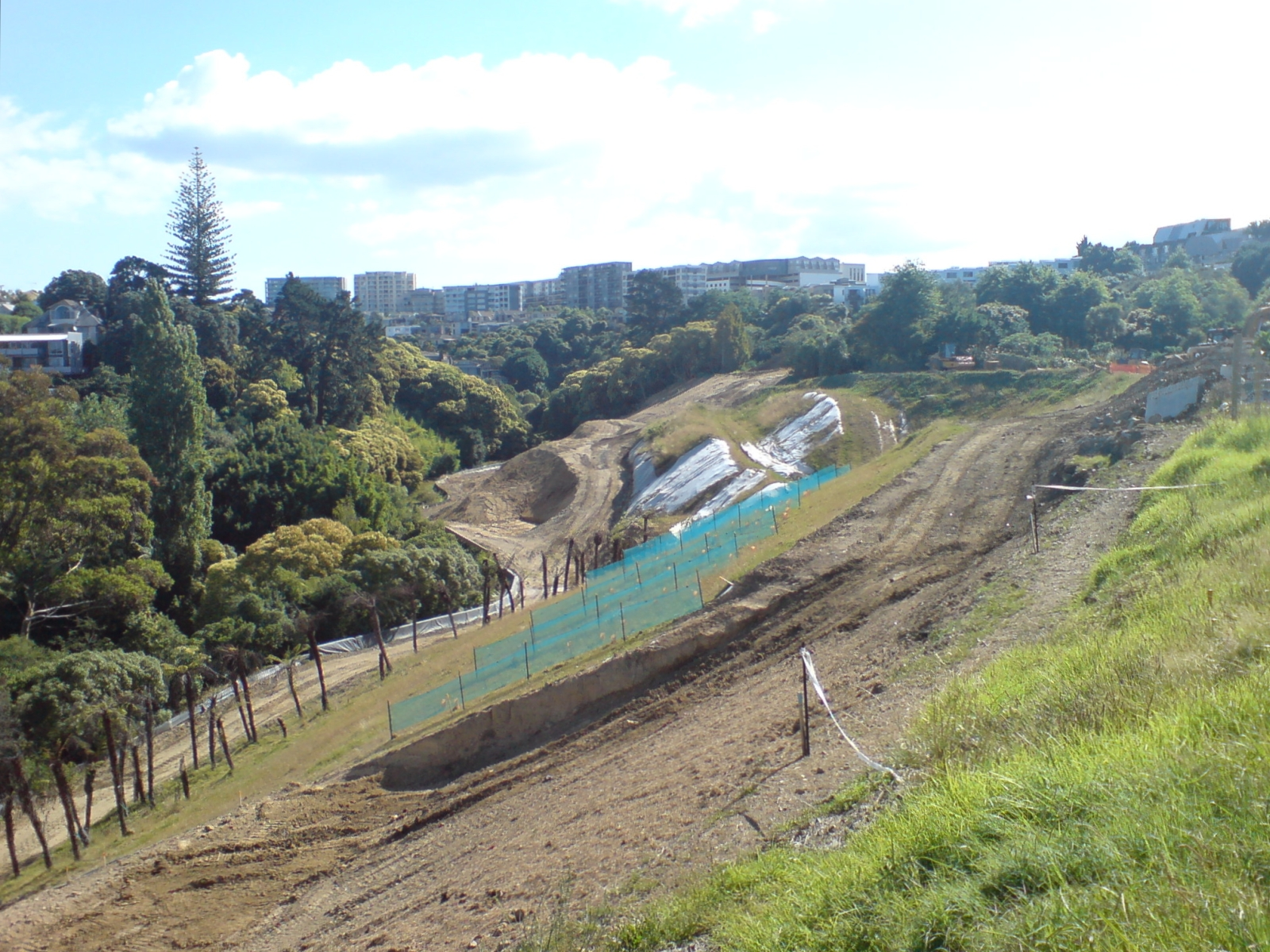
The park remedial works ongoing in early 2011.

During works in the park in recent years, it was discovered that not only was the slope still at risk of further, large landslips, the area was also partially contaminated from the early rubbish dump use, and it was feared that toxins could eventually leach into the watercourse. As of 2011, Council is still in the process of a several-year program of rebuilding the slope in a more permanently stable (slightly less steep) form, after which the landscape will be revegetated, and the parks facilities (which are currently mostly removed or inaccessible) restored, including a local lake. The works are expected to cost $6.2 million.

Some locals have expressed concern about the large-scale removal of several hectares of trees for the slope stabilisation and landfill remediation works, and have alleged that Council chose the cheapest option for the works, when other opportunities were available to retain more trees. Council defended the need for the works, while a spokesperson for Forest & Bird also considered that enough trees would be retained around the cleared areas to reduce impact on local birdlife.

After works started, there was further special concern for the (north)eastern part of the park, along Ayr Street, where locals remain insistent that works should avoid mature trees and tree ferns, some of them 60 to 80 years old. They also allege that the rubbish layers do not extend to this area, based on preliminary works undertaken in the remediation. Council has indicated a willingness to assess this possibility.

In early 2012, it was noted that the remediation works had planted more than 10,000 native trees and other plants.
