= Brian Turner (footballer, born 1949) =

New Zealand footballer

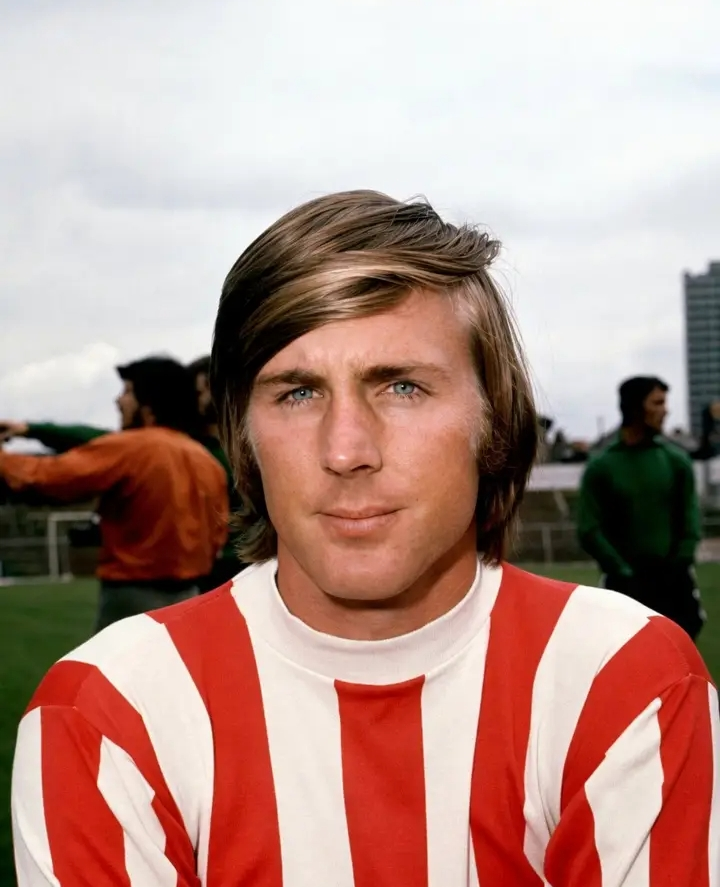

Personal information
- Full name: Brian Alfred Turner
- Date of birth: 31 July 1949 (age 77)
- Place of birth: East Ham, England
- Positions: Midfielder; striker

Senior career*
Years	Team	Apps	(Gls)
1966	Ponsonby	2	(3)
1967	Eden	15	(10)
1968–1969	Chelsea	0	(0)
1969–1970	Portsmouth	4	(0)
1970–1972	Brentford	92	(7)
1972–1980	Mount Wellington	155	(62)
1981	Blacktown City	11	(2)
1981	Wollongong Wolves	7	(0)
1982	Gisborne City	19	(1)
1983	Papatoetoe	21	(4)
1984–1985	Mount Wellington	40	(?)
1986–1988	Bay Olympic		
Total		366	(89)

International career
1967–1982	New Zealand	59	(21)
Medal record
Men's association football
Representing New Zealand
OFC Nations Cup
Winner	1973 New Zealand
- * Club domestic league appearances and goals

Brian Alfred Turner (born 31 July 1949 in England) is a New Zealand football former player, who was a prominent squad member during the country's first successful campaign to qualify for the FIFA World Cup, in 1982. He was assistant coach for the New Zealand national team that played in the 2010 FIFA World Cup.

== Clubs coached ==
Turner has served on the coaching staffs of Wellington Phoenix FC, Auckland Manukau United, Onehunga Sports, and Fencibles AFC 2013.

== Club career ==
Turner was born in England and moved to New Zealand at an early age. He began his senior playing career in New Zealand with Ponsonby and Eden before returning to England in 1968 where he joined Chelsea FC for a season, but failed to make a 1st team appearance. He then moved to Portsmouth FC for a short stint and ultimately to Brentford FC where he spent 2 1/2 seasons. Turner returned to New Zealand in 1972 where he spent 8 seasons with Mt Wellington. In 1981 Turner moved to Australia, playing first with Blacktown City then Wollongong Wolves before once again returning to his adopted country to play for Gisborne City, Papatoetoe and Mt Wellington again.

== International career ==
He made his A-International debut in a 3–5 loss against trans-Tasman rival Australia on 5 November 1967 in the 1967 South Vietnam Independence Cup and went on to earn 59 A-international caps in which he scored a credible 21 goals. His international career spanned a then national record 102 appearances in the All White strip including unofficial matches.

Turner was an integral member of the New Zealand side that qualified for the 1982 FIFA World Cup in Spain, playing in all but 3 qualifying matches. However, his only appearance at the finals was as a late substitute in the 0–4 loss to Brazil. It was to be his last game for his adopted country, Turner announcing his international retirement after their elimination following group stage losses against Scotland, USSR and Brazil.

Turner continued to play domestically in New Zealand through his thirties before continuing his football involvement in coaching roles. Brian's achievements earned him three Player of the Year titles, and in 1995 he was inducted into the New Zealand Soccer Hall of Fame

== Administration career ==
In 2013, Turner founded the independent group Friends of Football

== Honours ==
=== Player ===
Mt Wellington

- National League: 1972, 1974, 1979, 1980
- Chatham Cup: 1973, 1980

Brentford

- Football League Fourth Division third-place promotion: 1971–72

New Zealand

- OFC Nations Cup: 1973

=== Individual ===
- New Zealand Footballer of the Year: 1974, 1979, 1980
- NZSMA Hall of Fame: 1995
- Friends of Football Medal of Excellence: 2015
