= 1973 Oceania Cup =

1973 OFC Kapu o Kīngitanga

Tournament details
- Host country: New Zealand
- Dates: 17–24 February
- Teams: 5 (from 1 confederation)
- Venue: 1 (in 1 host city)

Final positions
- Champions: New Zealand (1st title)
- Runners-up: Tahiti
- Third place: New Caledonia
- Fourth place: New Hebrides

Tournament statistics
- Matches played: 12
- Goals scored: 38 (3.17 per match)
- Top scorer(s): (New Caledonia) Segin Wayewol (NCL) (New Zealand) Alan Marley (French Polynesia) Erroll Bennett (TAH) (3 goals each)

The 1973 Oceania Cup was the first Oceania-wide football tournament ever held. It took place in New Zealand from 17 February 1973–24 February 1973. All matches were held at Newmarket Park, in Auckland, and five teams participated: New Zealand, New Caledonia, Tahiti, New Hebrides (now known as Vanuatu) and Fiji.

At the time, the Oceania Football Confederation was not considered a full FIFA Confederation, and as such allowed national teams unaffiliated with FIFA to enter.

The teams played each other according to a round-robin format, and the top two teams (New Zealand and Tahiti) played off in a final to determine the winner. New Caledonia and New Hebrides also played each other, on the same day as the final, to determine third place.

New Zealand won the tournament with a 2–0 victory in the final, while New Caledonia retained third place by defeating New Hebrides.

== Venues ==
Auckland
Newmarket Park
Capacity: 14,000

== First round ==
Pos	Team	Pld	W	D	L	GF	GA	GD	Pts	Qualification
1	New Zealand	4	3	1	0	11	4	+7	7	Advance to final
2	Tahiti	4	3	1	0	8	2	+6	7	Advance to final
3	New Caledonia	4	2	0	2	8	5	+3	4	Advance to third place play-off
4	New Hebrides	4	1	0	3	4	9	−5	2	Advance to third place play-off
5	Fiji	4	0	0	4	2	13	−11	0	

17 February 1973

Tahiti	2–1	New Caledonia
Erroll Bennett (?); Alexis Tumahai (?)	Report	Roger Mandin (?)

Newmarket Park, Auckland
Referee: T. Delahunty (New Zealand)
17 February 1973

New Zealand	5–1	Fiji
Brian Turner (?); David Taylor (?); Geoff Brand (?); Malcolm Bland (?); Alan Vest (?)	Report	Terio Vakatawa (?)

Newmarket Park, Auckland
Referee: A. Nakagawa (New Caledonia)

18 February 1973

New Caledonia	4–1	New Hebrides
Jean Hmae (?); Segin Wayewol (?); Pierre Wacapo (?)	Report	Michael Dupuy (?)

Newmarket Park, Auckland
Referee: P. Tahuaitu (Tahiti)
18 February 1973

New Zealand	1–1	Tahiti
Alan Vest (?)	Report	Erroll Bennett (?)

Newmarket Park, Auckland
Referee: P. Raman (Fiji)

20 February 1973

New Caledonia	2–0	Fiji
Segin Wayewol (?)	Report

Newmarket Park, Auckland
Referee: B. Chaudet (New Hebrides)
20 February 1973

Tahiti	1–0	New Hebrides
Erroll Bennett (?)	Report

Newmarket Park, Auckland
Referee: A. Nakagawa (New Caledonia)

21 February 1973

New Hebrides	2–1	Fiji
Alick Saurei (?); Jacky Valette (?)	Report	Josateki Kurivitu (?)

Newmarket Park, Auckland
Referee: T. Delahunty (New Zealand)
21 February 1973

New Zealand	2–1	New Caledonia
Alan Marley (?); Colin Latimour (?)	Report	Jean Xowie (?)

Newmarket Park, Auckland
Referee: B. Chaudet (New Hebrides)

23 February 1973

Tahiti	4–0	Fiji
Claude Carrara (?); Harold Ng Fok (?); Gilles Malinowski (?); Roland de Marigny (?)	Report

Newmarket Park, Auckland
Referee: A. Nakagawa (New Caledonia)
23 February 1973

New Zealand	3–1	New Hebrides
Malcolm Bland (?); Brian Hardman (?); Alan Marley (?)	Report	Raymond Valette (?)

Newmarket Park, Auckland
Referee: P. Tahuaitu (Tahiti)

=== Third place play-off ===
24 February 1973

New Caledonia	2–1	New Hebrides
Gerald Delmas (?); Jean Xowie (?)	Report	Charles Galinie (?)

Newmarket Park, Auckland
Referee: P. Tahuaitu (Tahiti)

=== Final ===
24 February 1973

New Zealand	2–0	Tahiti
David Taylor (?); Alan Marley (?)	Report

Newmarket Park, Auckland
Referee: B. Chaudet (New Hebrides)

1973 OFC Nations Cup winners

New Zealand
First title

== Goalscorers ==
There were 37 goals scored in 12 matches, for an average of 3.08 goals per match.

3 goals

- (New Caledonia) Segin Wayewol (NCL)
- (New Zealand) Alan Marley
- (French Polynesia) Erroll Bennett (TAH)

2 goals

- (New Caledonia) Jean Hmae (NCL)
- (New Caledonia) Jean Xowie (NCL)
- (New Zealand) Malcolm Bland
- (New Zealand) David Taylor
- (New Zealand) Alan Vest

1 goal

- (Fiji) Josateki Kurivitu
- (Fiji) Terio Vakatawa
- (New Caledonia) Gerald Delmas (NCL)
- (New Caledonia) Roger Mandin (NCL)
- (New Caledonia) Pierre Wacapo (NCL)
- (New Hebrides) Michael Dupuy
- (New Hebrides) Charles Galinie
- (New Hebrides) Alick Saurei
- (New Hebrides) Jacky Valette
- (New Hebrides) Raymond Valette
- (New Zealand) Geoff Brand
- (New Zealand) Brian Hardman
- (New Zealand) Colin Latimour
- (New Zealand) Brian Turner
- (French Polynesia) Claude Carrara (TAH)
- (French Polynesia) Harold Ng Fok (TAH)
- (French Polynesia) Gilles Malinowski (TAH)
- (French Polynesia) Roland de Marigny (TAH)
- (French Polynesia) Alexis Tumahai (TAH)
