= New Zealand men's national football team =

Team representing New Zealand in men's international football competitions

New Zealand
- Nickname: All Whites
- Association: New Zealand Football (NZF)
- Confederation: OFC (Oceania)
- Head coach: Des Buckingham
- Captain: Chris Wood
- Most caps: Chris Wood (97)
- Top scorer: Chris Wood (47)
- Home stadium: Various
- FIFA code: NZL
First colours	Second colours

FIFA ranking
- Current: 84 ▲4 (18 November 2026)
- Highest: 47 (August 2002)
- Lowest: 161 (April–May 2016)

First international
- New Zealand 3–1 Australia (Dunedin, New Zealand; 17 June 1922)

Biggest win
- New Zealand 13–0 Fiji (Auckland, New Zealand; 16 August 1981)

Biggest defeat
- New Zealand 0–10 Australia (Wellington, New Zealand; 11 July 1936)

World Cup
- Appearances: 3 (first in 1982)
- Best result: Group stage (1982, 2010, 2026)

OFC Nations Cup
- Appearances: 11 (first in 1973)
- Best result: Champions (1973, 1998, 2002, 2008, 2016, 2024)

Confederations Cup
- Appearances: 4 (first in 1999)
- Best result: Group stage (1999, 2003, 2009, 2017)
Medal record
Men's football
OFC Nations Cup
Gold medal – first place	1973 New Zealand	Team
Gold medal – first place	1998 Australia	Team
Gold medal – first place	2002 New Zealand	Team
Gold medal – first place	2008 No Host	Team
Gold medal – first place	2016 Papua New Guinea	Team
Gold medal – first place	2024 Vanuatu & Fiji	Team
Silver medal – second place	2000 Tahiti	Team
Bronze medal – third place	1996 No Host	Team
Bronze medal – third place	2004 Australia	Team
Bronze medal – third place	2012 Solomon Islands	Team
AFC–OFC Challenge Cup
Silver medal – second place	2003 Iran	Team
- Website: www.nzfootball.co.nz

The New Zealand men's national football team (Māori: Tīma hoka a-motu o Aotearoa) represents New Zealand in men's international football competitions. The team is governed by the governing body for football in New Zealand, New Zealand Football (NZF), which is a member of FIFA and the Oceania Football Confederation (OFC). The team's official nickname is the All Whites (Māori: Ōmā, [ɔːmaː]).

The team represented New Zealand at the FIFA World Cup tournaments in 1982, 2010, and 2026. It also participated in the FIFA Confederations Cup in 1999, 2003, 2009, and 2017. New Zealand is a six-time OFC Nations Cup champion. New Zealand was the only unbeaten country in the 2010 FIFA World Cup, drawing all three group stage games; nevertheless, they were eliminated in the group stage.

== History ==
=== Early years ===
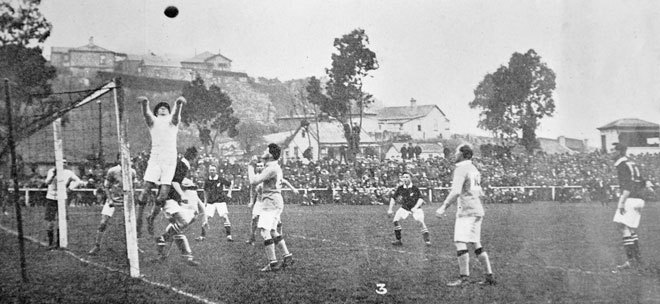
New Zealand playing Australia in 1922

New Zealand's first international football match was played in Dunedin at the old Caledonian Ground on 23 July 1904 against a team representing New South Wales. New Zealand lost by the game's only goal, but drew with the same team 3–3 in a game at Athletic Park, Wellington seven days later. The following year the team played a Wellington representative side on 10 June before embarking on a tour of Australia, during which they played eleven representative sides, including three "test matches" against New South Wales. Of these three matches they won one, lost one, and drew one.

A New Zealand national team did not play again until 1922, when New Zealand played three official full internationals against Australia, played at Carisbrook in Dunedin, Athletic Park in Wellington, and Auckland Domain. The results were two 3–1 wins to New Zealand and a 1–1 draw in Wellington. In 1927, Canada became the second team to play in New Zealand as they played in four official matches with a win and a draw.

New Zealand would become one of the founding members of the Oceania Football Confederation in 1966, which was founded by Charlie Dempsey and his Australian colleague Jim Bayutti.

=== Success for Spain '82 ===
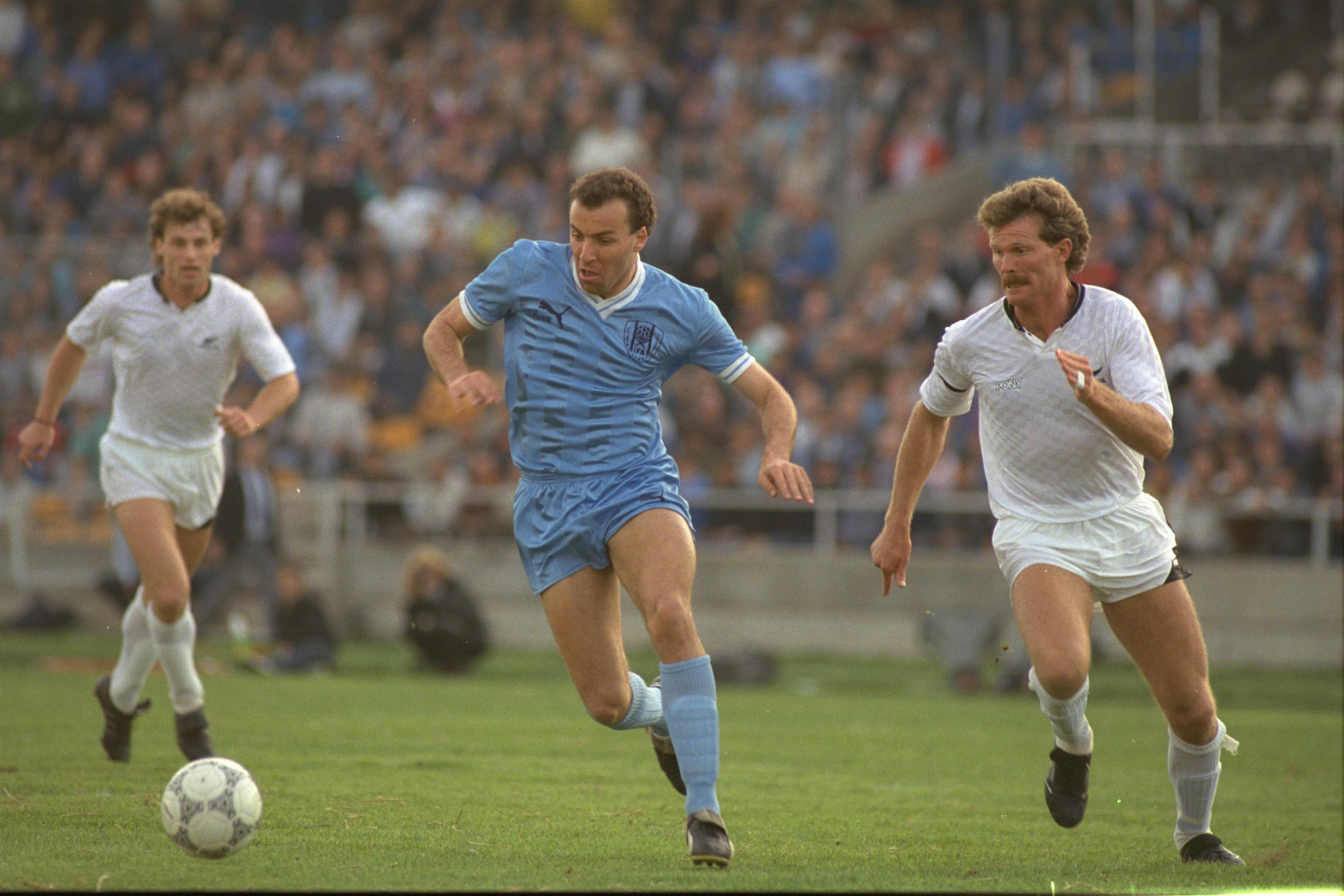
New Zealand playing against Israel during the 1990 FIFA World Cup qualifiers

At the beginning of the 1980s the All Whites were on a run of consecutive victories until the 1980 Oceania Cup in New Caledonia. New Zealand ended up having a disastrous campaign, losing 1–3 and 0–4 to Tahiti and Fiji respectively. In the last round without a possible qualification for the final they beat the Solomon Islands 6–1.

The All Whites later improved when the team advanced to the final phase of the qualifiers for the 1982 World Cup. With zero losses, the team's strength was highlighted by a 3–3 draw and a 1–0 victory against Australia, and a 13–0 victory against Fiji. For the final phase the All Whites, competed against China PR, Saudi Arabia and Kuwait. After a 5–0 victory against the Saudis, they competed in a play-off match against China, winning 2–1, eventually qualifying for the World Cup in Spain.

Up until the 1980s, the All Whites received criticism for having a high number of British players. Of the 22-man squad in their 1982 World Cup campaign, 11 members were born in the United Kingdom. This included the captain Steve Sumner and striker Steve Wooddin, who had both played club football in England before immigrating. They lost all three games conceding 12 goals and scoring just 2. Over the following decades the composition of the national squad changed and "the face of football became increasingly Kiwi".

Sent into Group 6, alongside Brazil, Scotland and Soviet Union, New Zealand lost all three games, with Sumner and Woodin scoring the team's only goals, that happened in the 5–2 loss to Scotland.

Pos	Team	Pld	W	D	L	GF	GA	GD	Pts	Qualification
1	Brazil	3	3	0	0	10	2	+8	6	Advance to second round
2	Soviet Union	3	1	1	1	6	4	+2	3	Advance to second round
3	Scotland	3	1	1	1	8	8	0	3	
4	New Zealand	3	0	0	3	2	12	−10	0	

Source: FIFA

=== Consolidation in Oceania ===
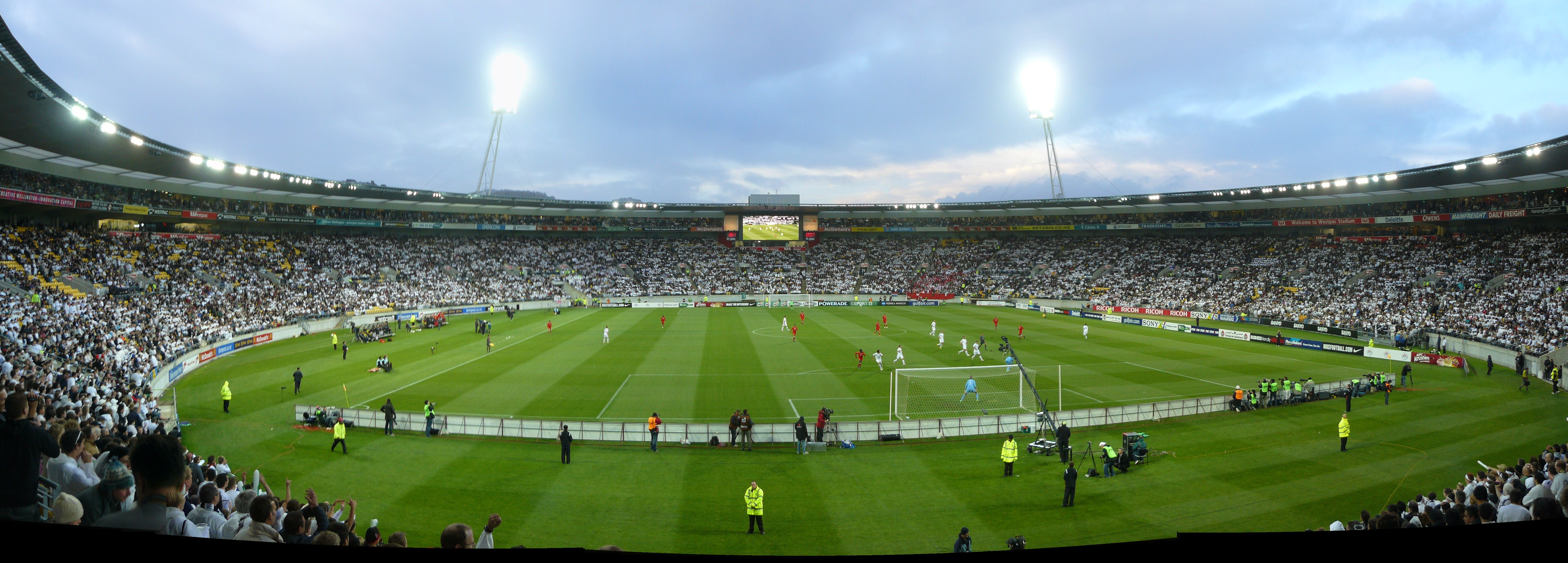
New Zealand playing against Bahrain in the 2010 FIFA World Cup inter-confederation play-offs at the Westpac Stadium

Since the 1990s, United States college soccer has played a significant role in the development of New Zealand players. This influence began when former Scotland international Bobby Clark returned to the US after his 1994–96 stint as New Zealand head coach to take the head coaching job at Stanford University. Clark began recruiting in New Zealand, and former New Zealand national players Ryan Nelsen and Simon Elliott played for him at Stanford. The trend that Clark started has continued to the present; more than two dozen New Zealanders are now playing for NCAA Division I men's programmes in the US. A common next step in these players' career paths is a stint in Major League Soccer; ESPN soccernet journalist Brent Latham speculated in a March 2010 story that New Zealand's 2010 World Cup squad could have more MLS players than the US squad.

However, Latham's speculation did not prove true, as only one MLS player made the New Zealand squad for the World Cup. New Zealand formerly competed against Australia for top honours in the OFC. However, after Australia left to join the AFC in 2006, New Zealand were left as the only seeded team in the OFC. New Zealand qualified for the 2010 World Cup, though exited the competition after the first round despite being the only team not to lose a game during the tournament. They drew 1–1 versus defending champions Italy, along with Slovakia and a scoreless match against Paraguay while eventual champions Spain lost to Switzerland. New Zealand finished above Italy in their group as the Italians lost to Slovakia in their final group match and finished with two points compared to New Zealand's three.

Pos	Team	Pld	W	D	L	GF	GA	GD	Pts	Qualification
1	Paraguay	3	1	2	0	3	1	+2	5	Advance to knockout stage
2	Slovakia	3	1	1	1	4	5	−1	4	Advance to knockout stage
3	New Zealand	3	0	3	0	2	2	0	3	
4	Italy	3	0	2	1	4	5	−1	2	

Source: FIFA
Rules for classification: Tie-breaking criteria

=== Horror in Honiara and World Cup misses ===
After a very positive cycle for the All Whites, the team competed for the 2012 OFC Nations Cup as favourites to win the title winning the first two games by a small margin of victory (1–0 and 2–1), and a 1–1 draw against the Solomonese. In the next round, they faced New Caledonia in the semi-final, where they suffered 2–0 loss, with goals from Bertrand Kaï in the 60th minute, and Georges Gope-Fenepej in the second minute of second-half stoppage time to seal the defeat known as the Horror in Honiara. Ricki Herbert stepped down, but New Zealand would also be eliminated in the intercontinental play-off for the 2014 World Cup by Mexico 9–3 on aggregate.

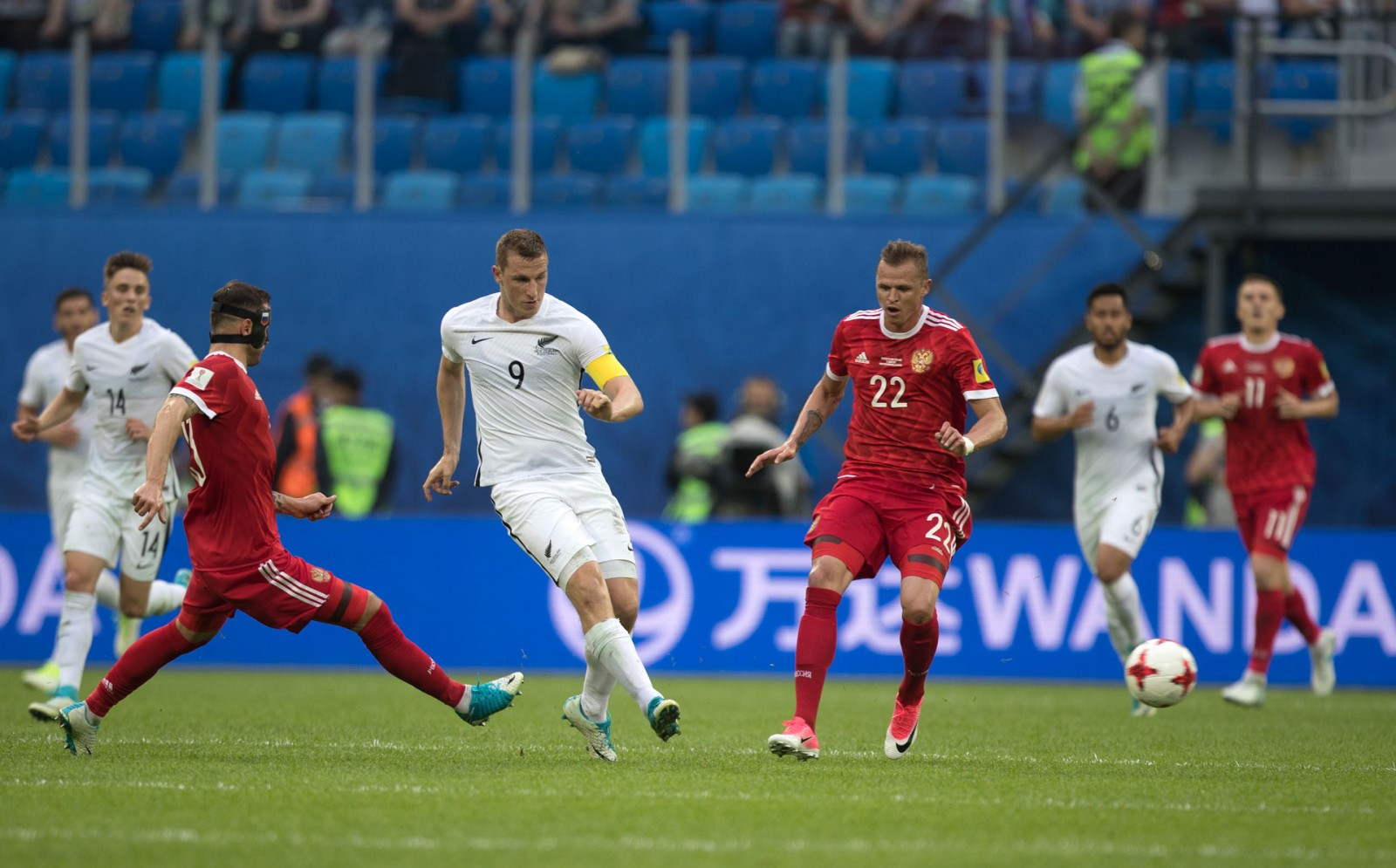
New Zealand playing against Russia in the 2017 FIFA Confederations Cup

In August 2014, Anthony Hudson was appointed manager of the All Whites. Hudson's first game in charge of the national team was a 3–1 defeat away to Uzbekistan in September. As a result of the All Whites playing "just three matches" in the previous year, which was "the least of any country in world football", and having "seven months without a match" the All Whites dropped to 161st in the FIFA World Rankings. The All Whites went on to win the 2016 OFC Nations Cup, winning four matches with the final being won via a penalty shootout after a 0–0 draw against Papua New Guinea, conceding only one goal, from a penalty, in the process. New Zealand's victory saw them crowned Oceania champions making New Zealand the most successful national team in the competition's history, having won the tournament five times, and also saw them qualify for the 2017 FIFA Confederations Cup in Russia. The All Whites moved up to 88th in the FIFA World Rankings, the highest ranking in three years, on the back of the OFC Nations Cup victory that qualified them for the 2017 FIFA Confederations Cup.

After a disappointing tournament at the 2017 FIFA Confederations Cup where they finished bottom of their group which featured Russia, Mexico and Portugal, the national team fell 27 places to 122nd. In September 2017, New Zealand won the OFC Final against the Solomon Islands with an aggregate score of 8–3 to qualify for the inter-continental play-off qualifier against Peru, the fifth-ranked nation from South America's qualifiers. After holding Peru off in the first leg, they would go to lose 2–0 in the second leg to be eliminated from competition as Peru became the last team to qualify for the 2018 FIFA World Cup.

After the All Whites' stoppage for almost two years, they returned to play friendlies (in 2021), obtaining positive results in their three (four counting against Algeria A') games played in that year. With the complications caused by the COVID-19 pandemic, the 2022 World Cup qualifiers were held in the host country itself, Qatar, where the Kiwis managed to win all the games, as well as breaking artillery records, when forward Chris Wood became the All Whites' top scorer, after scoring twice against Fiji.

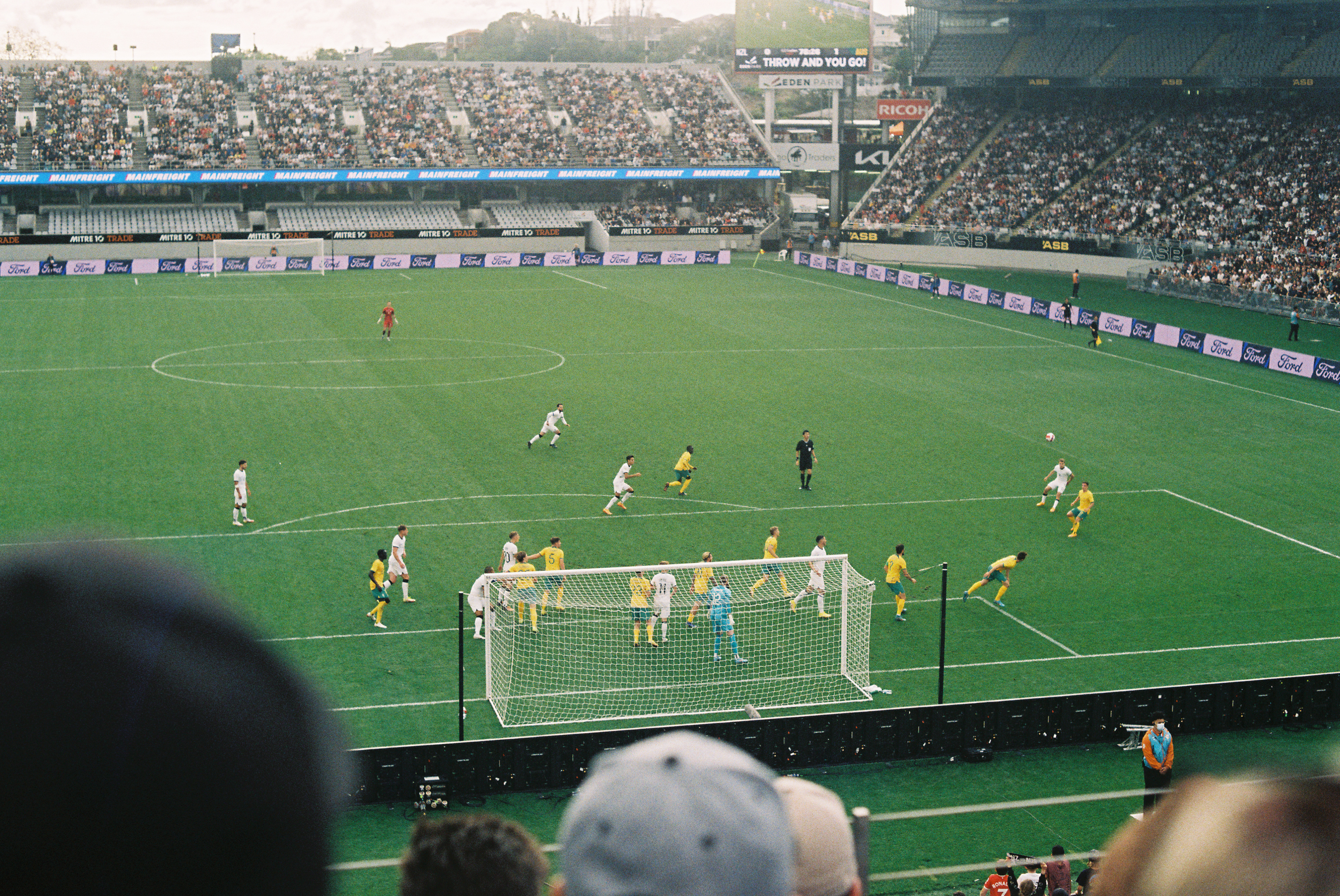
New Zealand playing Australia at home at Eden Park in a match commemorating the rivalry

With the continental victory, they qualified for the inter-confederation play-offs, where they disputed the vacancy against Costa Rica. They started by conceding a goal in the 3rd minute of the game to Joel Campbell, but New Zealand began to pressure the game, and in the 39th minute, Chris Wood scored after a poor kick by Yeltsin Tejeda. However, his goal was disallowed when the video assistant referee (VAR) showed that Matthew Garbett had fouled Óscar Duarte before the goal. As the final whistle blew, the New Zealanders failed to qualify for the Cup, which was their third consecutive elimination in the inter-confederation play-offs.

After the qualifiers, the All Whites played a home and away series against the Socceroos to mark the 100th anniversary of the first meeting between the two nations, which was first played in Dunedin in 1922.

=== Return to the international scene ===
In June 2023, with Darren Bazeley already having his position as coach for the 2026 cycle, in a friendly against Qatar where the All Whites were winning during the first half, New Zealand defender Michael Boxall claimed to have suffered a racist attack from the Qatari player Yusuf Abdurisag, and in protest by the New Zealand team players against the referee for not acting in this situation, they abandoned the match, not playing the second remaining time.

Shortly afterwards, there was the return of the Soccer Ashes dispute against the Australians after the original urn was found again after almost 70 years of its disappearance. The decisive title match was played in October in England, in which Australia consolidated its superiority after a solid 2–0 victory. New Zealand also competed in the Oceania Nations Cup in Vanuatu, emerging as champions after a strong campaign in which they did not concede a single goal, and a part of the squad was then selected to compete for the "OlyWhites" at the Olympic Games in Paris, and these results enabled the team to break into the FIFA top 100 for the first time in seven years, reaching the 94th spot.

Following on this, they competed in qualifiers for the 2026 World Cup in North America as favourites to advance thanks to the expansion of the tournament to 48 teams, which granted the OFC a direct qualifying spot. They secured their place at the World Cup by winning every match including emphatic victories and defeating New Caledonia in the final in Auckland in March 2025, becoming the fifth team to qualify (and the second to do so via the qualifiers) and returning to the tournament after a 16-year absence.

After an important victory against Chile in the FIFA Series in Auckland, they qualified for the 2026 World Cup, being placed in pot 4 for the group stage draw, and ultimately drawn into Group G with Belgium, Egypt, and Iran. They played their first match against Iran, drawing 2–2 with two goals from Elijah Just, followed by two assists from Chris Wood, earning what would be their only point in the tournament, as in their subsequent matches they suffered heavy defeats against Egypt and Belgium, being eliminated last in the group stage. In the end, New Zealand managed to score two more goals in the tournament, but in total conceded 10 goals in their participation in the tournament.

On 17 November 2026, NZ Football announced the appointment of Des Buckingham as head coach, taking the team through to the 2030 FIFA World Cup. Bazeley's final games in charge were a two-game series against India at Mount Smart Stadium, Auckland and Te Kaha, Christchurch, winning 5–0 and 3–0 respectively.

== Team image ==
=== Kit ===
New Zealand's traditional home colours are white with a black trim, while its away kits are usually reversed, featuring black with a white trim. This reversal of the colour scheme by New Zealand's football team is due to the fact that black (the nation's traditional color in rugby) was traditionally reserved for referees by FIFA.

New Zealand's first national kit, 1922

Since late 2022, with the change of the institutional logo of New Zealand Football, there has been a greater preference for using only a fern leaf, without the name of the institution, which, regardless of the uniform (white or black), presents the leaf in a white color outlined in black.

==== Kit suppliers ====
			Kit wear suppliers
(Germany); Adidas (1972–83)	(France); Le Coq Sportif (1984–86)	(England); Mitre (1987–88)	(United States); Pony (1989–92)	(England); Mitre (1995–96)	(Germany); Adidas (1997–2003)	(United States); Nike (2004–23)	(Germany); Puma (2024–present)

=== Nickname ===
During the qualification for the 1982 FIFA World Cup, the team appeared for the first time in an all white uniform against Taiwan in 1981. This led a commentator to dub them the "All Whites", a play on the traditional name "All Blacks" used for the national rugby team. The name stuck, and was popularised in the song "Marching off to Spain" with its chant refrain "Kiwis! All Whites!"

=== Rivalries ===
New Zealand's long time rivals are Trans-Tasman neighbours Australia. The two teams' history dates back to 1922, where they first met in both their international debuts. The rivalry between the Socceroos (Australia) and the All Whites (New Zealand) is part of a wider friendly rivalry between the geographical neighbours Australia and New Zealand, which applies not only to sport but to the culture of the two countries. The rivalry was intensified when Australia and New Zealand were both members of the OFC, regularly competing in OFC Nations Cup finals and in FIFA World Cup qualification, where only one team from the OFC progressed to the World Cup.

Since Australia left the OFC to join the AFC in 2006, competition between the two teams has been less frequent. However, the rivalry between the two teams is still strong, with the occasional match receiving much media and public attention. The rivalry extends to club football, with New Zealand's only fully professional teams, the Wellington Phoenix and Auckland FC, playing in the Australian A-League.

=== Supporters ===
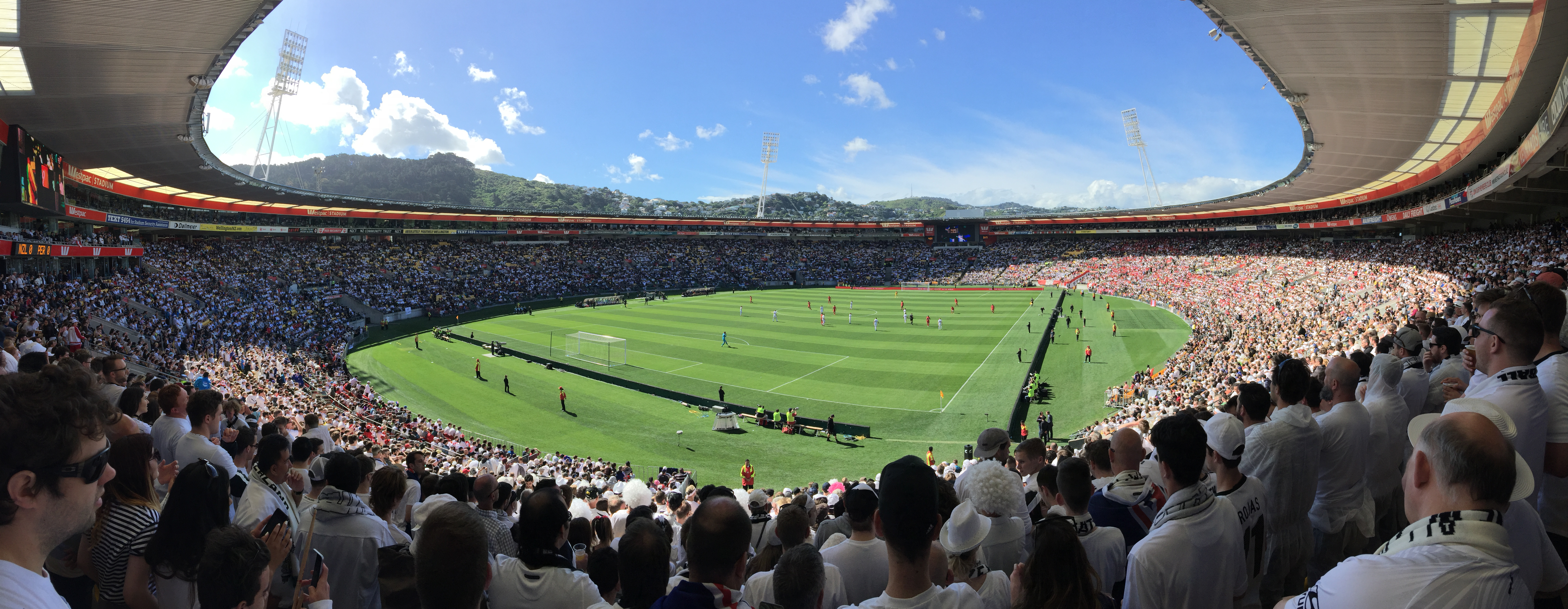
Panorama from the 'White Noise' zone during New Zealand v Peru – 2018 FIFA World Cup inter-confederation play-offs at the Sky Stadium

The main supporter group of the New Zealand national team are known as the White Noise. White Noise was formed in November 2007 with the supporters group of the Wellington Phoenix, 'Yellow Fever', rebranding themselves when the national sides play. Additionally, The Flying Kiwis FC founded by Matt Fejos, have been New Zealand's main supporter group for away fixtures. The Flying Kiwis have been synonymous with organizing fan friendly matches with supporters of opposing teams, most notably during the 2017 FIFA Confederations Cup where they organized a friendly match between supporters of the Russian national team.

=== Home stadium ===
New Zealand does not have a dedicated national stadium. Instead, the team plays at different venues throughout the country for exhibition or tournament purposes. In recent years, major international matches have usually been rotated around various large grounds, including the Wellington Regional Stadium and the North Harbour Stadium in Auckland. International matches have also been played at the Mount Smart Stadium and Eden Park in Auckland.

== Results and fixtures ==
The following is a list of match results in the last 12 months, as well as any future matches that have been scheduled.

Win Draw Loss Fixture

=== 2026 ===
27 March 2026 FIFA Series	New Zealand	0–2	Finland	Auckland, New Zealand
19:15 UTC+13		Report	Pohjanpalo 25'; Oksanen 85'	Stadium: Eden Park; Attendance: 17,603; Referee: Casey Reibelt (Australia)

30 March 2026 FIFA Series	New Zealand	4–1	Chile	Auckland, New Zealand
19:00 UTC+13	Barbarouses 31'; Just 40'; Randall 60'; Waine 71'	Report	Osorio (yellow card) 23' (yellow-red card) 27'; Tapia 83'	Stadium: Eden Park; Attendance: 14,327; Referee: Jack Morgan (Australia)

2 June Friendly	Haiti	4–0	New Zealand	Fort Lauderdale, United States
20:00 UTC−4 (Note: Kick-off was delayed until 20:36 due to lightning in the area before the match.)	Providence 12'; Joseph 51'; Pierrot 62'; Lacroix 87'	Report		Stadium: Inter Miami CF Stadium; Attendance: 21,000+ Referee: Rubiel Vazquez (United States)

7 June Friendly	England	1–0	New Zealand	Tampa, United States
16:00 UTC−4	Kane 45+2'	Report		Stadium: Raymond James Stadium; Attendance: 25,889; Referee: Natalie Simon

15 June 2026 FIFA World Cup Group G	Iran	2–2	New Zealand	Inglewood, United States
18:00 UTC−7	Rezaeian 32'; Mohebi 64'	Report	Just 7', 54'	Stadium: SoFi Stadium; Attendance: 70,108; Referee: César Arturo Ramos (Mexico)

21 June 2026 FIFA World Cup Group G	New Zealand	1–3	Egypt	Vancouver, Canada
18:00 UTC−7	Surman 15'	Report	Ziko 58'; Salah 67'; Trézéguet 82'	Stadium: BC Place; Attendance: 52,497; Referee: Omar Al Ali (United Arab Emirates)

26 June 2026 FIFA World Cup Group G	New Zealand	1–5	Belgium	Vancouver, Canada
20:00 UTC−7	Just 84'	Report	Trossard 28', 50'; De Bruyne 66'; Lukaku 86'; Saelemaekers 90+4'	Stadium: BC Place; Attendance: 52,497; Referee: Adham Makhadmeh (Jordan)

24 September 2026 China Competition	Palestine	2–2	New Zealand	Chongqing, China
17:30 UTC+8	Al Hamlawi 27'; Dabbagh 39'	Report	Waine 5'; Randall 35'	Stadium: Tongliang Long Stadium; Attendance: 0 (Played behind closed doors); Referee: Wang Di (China)

27 September 2026 China Competition	China	0–3	New Zealand	Chongqing, China
19:35 UTC+8		Report	Bindon 4'; Waine 29'; Parker-Price 82'	Stadium: Longxing Football Stadium; Attendance: 15,160; Referee: Choi Hyun-Jai (Korea Republic)

1 October 2026 Kirin Cup Soccer	Panama	1–1 (3–5 p)	New Zealand	Yokohama, Japan
15:10 UTC+9	Herbert 45+1'	Report	Stamenić 13'	Stadium: Nissan Stadium; Attendance: 8,513; Referee: Rubiel Vazquez (United States)
	Penalties
	Murillo (penalty scored); Harvey (penalty scored); Jiménez (penalty missed); Griffith (penalty missed)		(penalty scored) Bindon; (penalty scored) Stamenić; (penalty scored) Dyer; (penalty scored) Bayliss; (penalty scored) Boxall

5 October 2026 Kirin Cup Soccer	Japan	2–1	New Zealand	Tokyo, Japan
19:30 UTC+9	Ueda 28'; Dōan 71'	Report	Old 32'	Stadium: Japan National Stadium; Attendance: 61,812; Referee: Nazmi Nasaruddin (Malaysia)

12 November Friendly	New Zealand	5–0	India	Auckland, New Zealand
19:00 UTC+13	Varghese 5' (o.g.); Randall 34', 43'; Wood 57'; Bayliss 75'	AIFF; NZF		Stadium: Go Media Stadium; Attendance: 10,379; Referee: Adam Kersey (Australia)

15 November Friendly	New Zealand	3–0	India	Christchurch, New Zealand
16:30 UTC+13	Surman 22'; McGarry 40'; Wood 44'	AIFF; NZF		Stadium: One New Zealand Stadium; Referee: Tim Danaskos (Australia)

== Coaching staff ==
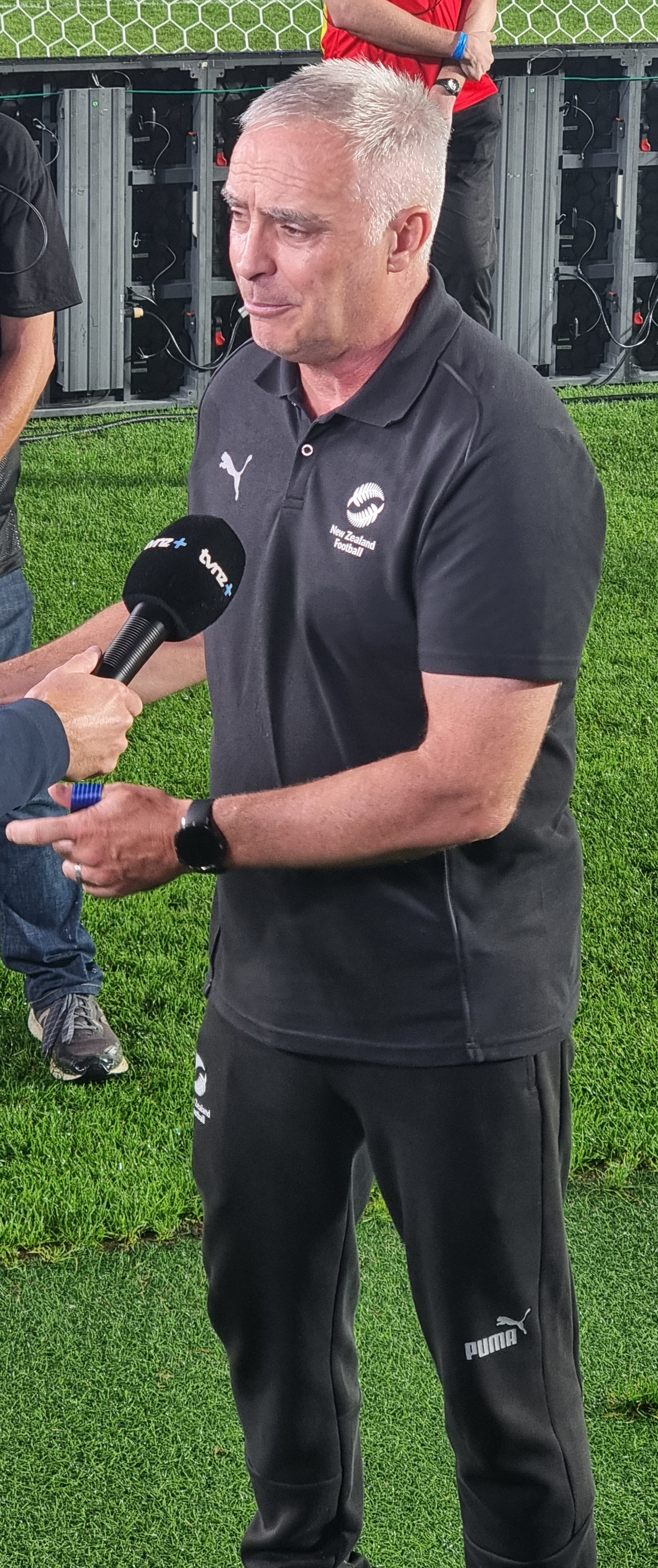
Current head coach Darren Bazeley

Position	Name
Technical director	(New Zealand) Andrew Boyens
Head coach	Vacant (from November 2026) (England) Des Buckingham (from 1 July 2027)
Assistant coach	(New Zealand) Simon Elliott
Assistant coach	(New Zealand) Glen Moss
Assistant coach	(England) Tony Readings
Goalkeeping coach	(Scotland) Jonathan Gould
Performance manager	(New Zealand) Ryan Nelsen
Team manager	(New Zealand) Simon Hilton
Sports scientist	(South Africa) Sunz Singh
Doctor	(Scotland) Chan Dassanayake
Physiotherapist	(New Zealand) Roland Jeffery
Physiotherapist	(New Zealand) Adam Crump

== Players ==
For all past and present players who have appeared for the national team, see New Zealand men's national team players.

=== Current squad ===
The following 23 players are called up for the series against India from 12 to 15 November 2026.

Caps and goals updated as of 15 November 2026 after the match against India.

No.	Pos.	Player	Date of birth (age)	Caps	Goals	Club
1	GK	Alex Paulsen	4 July 2002 (age 24)	13	0	(Scottish Football Association) Motherwell
12	GK	Michael Woud	16 January 1999 (age 27)	7	0	(New Zealand Football) Auckland FC
22	GK	Henry Gray	28 March 2005 (age 21)	2	0	(New Zealand Football) Wellington Phoenix
2	DF	Callan Elliot	7 July 1999 (age 27)	18	0	(New Zealand Football) Auckland FC
3	DF	Francis de Vries	28 November 1994 (age 31)	24	1	(New Zealand Football) Auckland FC
4	DF	Michael Boxall	18 August 1988 (age 38)	70	1	(United States Soccer Federation) Minnesota United
5	DF	Finn Surman	23 September 2003 (age 23)	23	4	(United States Soccer Federation) Portland Timbers
13	DF	James McGarry	9 April 1998 (age 28)	9	1	(New Zealand Football) Wellington Phoenix
15	DF	Nando Pijnaker	25 February 1999 (age 27)	27	0	(New Zealand Football) Auckland FC
16	DF	Bill Tuiloma	27 March 1995 (age 31)	51	4	(New Zealand Football) Wellington Phoenix
18	DF	Matthew Sheridan	9 May 2004 (age 22)	2	0	(New Zealand Football) Wellington Phoenix
23	DF	Lukas Kelly-Heald	18 March 2005 (age 21)	6	0	(New Zealand Football) Wellington Phoenix
6	MF	Lachlan Bayliss	24 July 2002 (age 24)	9	1	(New Zealand Football) Auckland FC
8	MF	Owen Parker-Price	10 December 1998 (age 27)	7	1	(Swedish Football Association) Örgryte
10	MF	Matt Garbett	13 April 2002 (age 24)	40	5	(The Football Association) Peterborough United
14	MF	Alex Rufer	12 June 1996 (age 30)	32	0	(New Zealand Football) Wellington Phoenix
20	MF	Callum McCowatt	30 April 1999 (age 27)	39	4	(Danish Football Association) AGF
7	FW	Logan Rogerson	28 May 1998 (age 28)	24	2	(New Zealand Football) Auckland FC
9	FW	Chris Wood (captain)	7 December 1991 (age 34)	97	47	(The Football Association) Nottingham Forest
11	FW	Liam Gillion	17 October 2002 (age 24)	3	0	(Football Australia) Western Sydney Wanderers
17	FW	Nathan Walker	30 January 2006 (age 20)	2	0	(New Zealand Football) Wellington Phoenix
19	FW	Corban Piper	10 September 2002 (age 24)	2	0	(New Zealand Football) Wellington Phoenix
21	FW	Jesse Randall	19 August 2002 (age 24)	20	5	(Scottish Football Association) Dundee United

=== Recent call-ups ===
The following players have been called up within the last 12 months and remain eligible for selection.

Pos.	Player	Date of birth (age)	Caps	Goals	Club	Latest call-up
GK	Max Crocombe	12 August 1993 (age 33)	27	0	(England) Millwall	2026 FIFA World Cup
DF	Tyler Bindon ^{INJ}	27 January 2005 (age 21)	32	4	(England) Charlton Athletic	v. India, 12 November 2026
DF	Dane Ingham	8 June 1999 (age 27)	18	0	(Malaysia) Sabah	v. Japan, 5 October 2026
DF	Sam Sutton	12 October 2001 (age 25)	8	0	(Australia) Perth Glory	v. Japan, 5 October 2026
DF	Dalton Wilkins	15 April 1999 (age 27)	7	0	(Denmark) Sønderjyske	v. Japan, 5 October 2026
DF	George Stanger	15 August 2000 (age 26)	4	0	(Scotland) Kilmarnock	v. Japan, 5 October 2026
DF	Tommy Smith	31 March 1990 (age 36)	56	2	(England) Bury Town	2026 FIFA World Cup
DF	Tim Payne	10 January 1994 (age 32)	54	3	(Paraguay) Olimpia	2026 FIFA World Cup
DF	Liberato Cacace	27 September 2000 (age 26)	40	1	(Wales) Wrexham	2026 FIFA World Cup
MF	Elijah Just	1 May 2000 (age 26)	51	12	(Wales) Swansea City	v. Japan, 5 October 2026
MF	Marko Stamenić	19 February 2002 (age 24)	46	4	(Wales) Swansea City	v. Japan, 5 October 2026
MF	Ben Old	13 August 2002 (age 24)	30	3	(France) Saint-Étienne	v. Japan, 5 October 2026
MF	Joe Bell	27 April 1999 (age 27)	35	1	(Norway) Viking	2026 FIFA World Cup
MF	Sarpreet Singh	20 February 1999 (age 27)	31	3	(Portugal) Farense	2026 FIFA World Cup
MF	Ryan Thomas	20 December 1994 (age 31)	28	3	(Netherlands) PEC Zwolle	2026 FIFA World Cup
FW	Ben Waine	11 June 2001 (age 25)	35	11	(England) Port Vale	v. Japan, 5 October 2026
FW	Moses Dyer	21 March 1997 (age 29)	14	1	(Cambodia) Phnom Penh Crown	v. Japan, 5 October 2026
FW	Stipe Ukich	3 January 2007 (age 19)	3	0	(Croatia) Istra 1961	v. Japan, 5 October 2026
FW	Kosta Barbarouses	19 February 1990 (age 36)	76	10	(Australia) South Melbourne	2026 FIFA World Cup
FW	Andre de Jong	2 November 1996 (age 30)	13	2	(South Africa) Orlando Pirates	v. Chile, 30 March 2026
^{INJ} Withdrew due to injury / absent from the national team due to injury^{PRE} Preliminary squad / standby^{RET} Retired from the national team^{SUS} Serving suspension^{WD} Player withdrew from the squad due to non-injury issue.

== Individual records ==
As of 15 November 2026
Players in bold are still active with New Zealand.

=== Most appearances ===
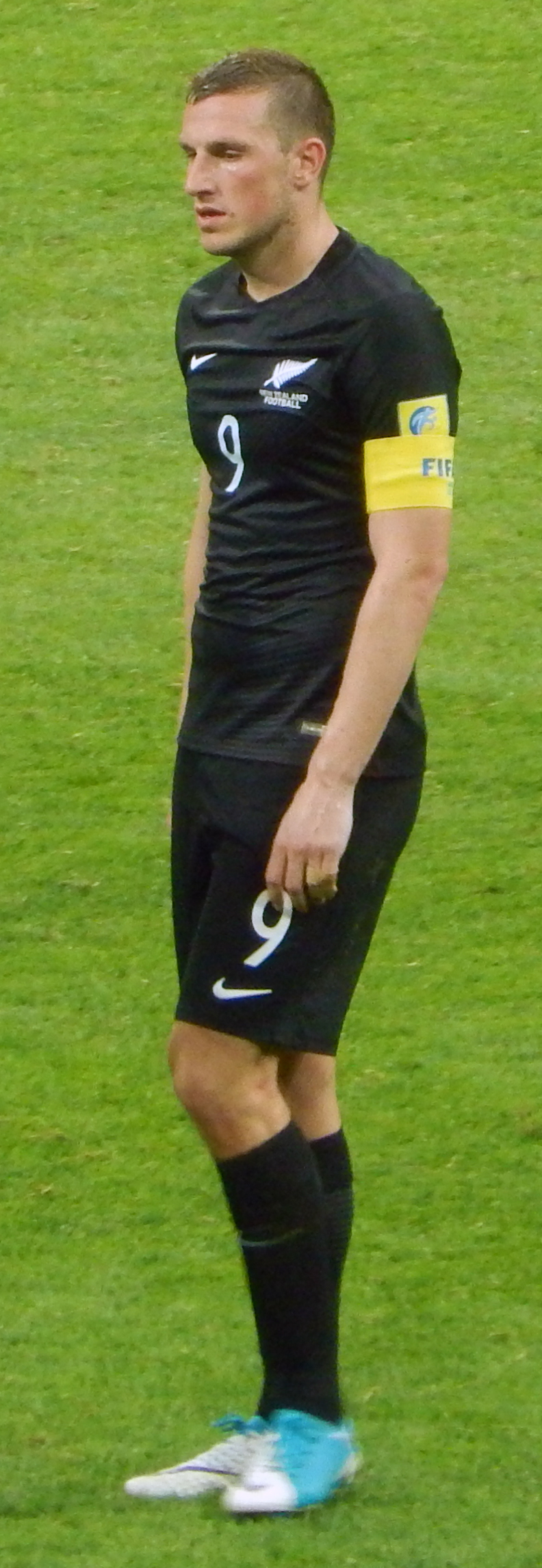
Chris Wood is New Zealand's top goalscorer and their most capped player.

Rank	Name	Caps	Goals	Position	Career
1	**Chris Wood**	97	47	FW	2009–present
2	Ivan Vicelich	88	6	DF	1995–2013
3	**Kosta Barbarouses**	76	10	FW	2008–present
4	**Michael Boxall**	70	1	DF	2011–present
5	Simon Elliott	69	6	MF	1995–2011
6	Vaughan Coveny	64	29	FW	1992–2006
7	Ricki Herbert	61	7	DF	1980–1989
8	Chris Jackson	60	10	MF	1992–2003
9	Brian Turner	59	21	MF	1967–1982
10	Duncan Cole	58	4	MF	1978–1988
10	Steve Sumner	58	22	MF	1976–1988

=== Top goalscorers ===
Rank	Player	Goals	Caps	Ratio	Career
1	**Chris Wood**	47	97	0.48	2009–present
2	Vaughan Coveny	29	64	0.45	1992–2006
3	Shane Smeltz	24	57	0.42	2003–2017
4	Steve Sumner	22	58	0.38	1976–1988
5	Brian Turner	21	59	0.36	1967–1982
6	Jock Newall	17	10	1.7	1951–1952
7	Keith Nelson	16	20	0.8	1977–1983
7	Chris Killen	16	48	0.33	2000–2013
9	Grant Turner	15	42	0.36	1980–1988
10	Wynton Rufer	12	23	0.52	1980–1997
10	Darren McClennan	12	43	0.28	1986–1997
10	**Elijah Just**	12	51	0.25	2019–present
10	Michael McGarry	12	54	0.22	1986–1997

=== Most clean sheets ===
Rank	Name	Clean sheets	Caps	Ratio	Career
1	Jason Batty	16	55	0.29	1994–2003
2	Stefan Marinovic	14	30	0.47	2015–2023
3	Mark Paston	13	36	0.36	1997–2013
4	Richard Wilson	10	26	0.38	1979–1984
5	Glen Moss	8	29	0.28	2006–2017
5	**Max Crocombe**	8	27	0.26	2018–present
7	**Alex Paulsen**	5	12	0.42	2024–present

=== Centuriate goals ===
Rank	Date	Scorer	Opponent	Score	Result
1st	17 June 1922	Ted Cook	Australia	**1**–0	3–1
100th	7 September 1958	unknown (Note: The 100th goal can still be considered unknown, as the order of who scored the goals is still unknown, but the possible authors of the 100th goal are, Bill Hume (where he scored three goals), George Cuthill and Charlie Steele Jr..)	New Caledonia	?–?	5–1
200th	20 March 1977	Keith Nelson	Taiwan	**5**–0	6–0
300th	14 December 1981	Wynton Rufer	Kuwait	**2**–1	2–2
400th	11 December 1988	Danny Halligan	Chinese Taipei	**4**–0	4–0
500th	11 June 2001	Chris Jackson	Solomon Islands	**4**–0	5–1
600th	4 June 2010	Rory Fallon	Slovenia	**1**–1	1–3
700th	30 March 2022	Chris Wood	Solomon Islands	**2**–0	5–0

== Competitive record ==
=== All-time record ===
For the all-time record of the national team against opposing nations, see the team's all-time record page.

As of 15 November 2026 vs India.

Pld	W	D	L	GF	GA	GD
445	183	80	182	784	660	+124

=== FIFA World Cup ===
New Zealand's FIFA World Cup										Qualification record						
Year	Round	Pos	Pld	W	D	L	GF	GA	Squad	Pos.	Pld	W	D	L	GF	GA
(Uruguay) 1930	Not member of FIFA									Not member of FIFA						
(Kingdom of Italy) 1934	Not member of FIFA									Not member of FIFA						
(French Third Republic) 1938	Not member of FIFA									Not member of FIFA						
(Fourth Brazilian Republic) 1950	Did not enter									Declined participation						
(Switzerland) 1954	Did not enter									Declined participation						
(Sweden) 1958	Did not enter									Declined participation						
(Chile) 1962	Did not enter									Declined participation						
(England) 1966	Did not enter									Declined participation						
(Mexico) 1970	Did not qualify									2nd round	2	0	0	2	0	6
(West Germany) 1974	Did not qualify									4th	6	0	3	3	5	12
(Argentina) 1978	Did not qualify									2nd	4	2	1	1	14	4
(Spain) 1982	Group stage	23rd	3	0	0	3	2	12	Squad	2nd (PO)	15	9	5	1	44	10
(Mexico) 1986	Did not qualify									3rd	6	3	1	2	13	7
(Italy) 1990	Did not qualify									3rd	6	3	1	2	13	8
(United States) 1994	Did not qualify									2nd	6	3	1	2	15	5
(France) 1998	Did not qualify									2nd	6	3	0	3	13	6
(South Korea) (Japan) 2002	Did not qualify									2nd	6	4	0	2	20	7
(Germany) 2006	Did not qualify									3rd	5	3	0	2	17	5
(South Africa) 2010	Group stage	22nd	3	0	3	0	2	2	Squad	1st (PO)	8	6	1	1	15	5
(Brazil) 2014	Did not qualify									1st (PO)	13	9	1	3	28	18
(Russia) 2018	Did not qualify									1st (PO)	13	8	4	1	24	6
(Qatar) 2022	Did not qualify									1st (PO)	6	5	0	1	18	2
(Canada) (Mexico) (United States) 2026	Group stage	40th	3	0	1	2	4	10	Squad	1st	5	5	0	0	29	1
(Morocco) (Portugal) (Spain) 2030	To be determined									To be determined						
(Saudi Arabia) 2034	To be determined									To be determined						
Total	Group stage	3/23	9	0	4	5	8	24	—	—	107	63	18	26	268	102

New Zealand's FIFA World Cup history
First match	Scotland 5–2 New Zealand (Málaga, Spain; 15 June 1982)
Biggest win	None
Biggest defeat	Brazil 4–0 New Zealand (Seville, Spain; 23 June 1982); New Zealand 1–5 Belgium (Vancouver, Canada; 26 June 2026)
Best result	Group stage in 1982, 2010, 2026
Worst result	Group stage in 1982, 2010, 2026

=== OFC Nations Cup ===
New Zealand's OFC Nations Cup record
Year	Host	Round	Pos.	Pld	W	D	L	GF	GA	Squad
1973	New Zealand	Champions	1st	5	4	1	0	13	4	Squad
1980	New Caledonia	Group stage	5th	3	1	0	2	7	8	—N/a
1996		Semi-finals	3rd	2	0	1	1	0	3	Squad
1998	Australia	Champions	1st	4	4	0	0	11	1	Squad
2000	Tahiti	Runners-up	2nd	4	3	0	1	7	3	Squad
2002	New Zealand	Champions	1st	5	5	0	0	23	2	Squad
2004	Australia	Third place	3rd	5	3	0	2	17	5	Squad
2008		Champions	1st	6	5	0	1	14	5	Squad
2012	Solomon Islands	Third place	3rd	5	3	1	1	8	7	Squad
2016	Papua New Guinea	Champions	1st	5	4	1	0	10	1	Squad
2024	Fiji, Vanuatu	Champions	1st	4	4	0	0	15	0	Squad
Total		6 titles	11/11	48	36	4	8	125	39	—
Champions Runners-up Third place

New Zealand's OFC Nations Cup history
First match	New Zealand 5–1 Fiji (Auckland, New Zealand; 17 February 1973)
Biggest win	New Zealand 10–0 Tahiti (Adelaide, Australia; 4 June 2004)
Biggest defeat	Fiji 4–0 New Zealand (Nouméa, New Caledonia; 27 February 1980)
Best result	Champions in 1973, 1998, 2002, 2008, 2016, 2024
Worst result	Group stage in 1980

=== FIFA Confederations Cup ===
FIFA Confederations Cup record
Year	Host	Round	Pld	W	D	L	GF	GA	Squad
1992	Saudi Arabia	No OFC representative invited							
1995	Saudi Arabia	No OFC representative invited							
1997	Saudi Arabia	Did not qualify							
1999	Mexico	Group stage	3	0	0	3	1	6	Squad
2001	South Korea; Japan	Did not qualify							
2003	France	Group stage	3	0	0	3	1	11	Squad
2005	Germany	Did not qualify							
2009	South Africa	Group stage	3	0	1	2	0	7	Squad
2013	Brazil	Did not qualify							
2017	Russia	Group stage	3	0	0	3	1	8	Squad
Total		Group stage	12	0	1	11	3	32	—

=== Summer Olympics ===
Summer Olympics record										Qualification record					
Year	Host	Round	Pos.	Pld	W	D	L	GF	GA	Pld	W	D	L	GF	GA
1908	(United Kingdom) London	Did not enter								Did not enter					
1912	(Sweden) Stockholm	Did not enter								Did not enter					
1920	(Belgium) Antwerp	Did not enter								Did not enter					
1924	(France) Paris	Did not enter								Did not enter					
1928	(Netherlands) Amsterdam	Did not enter								Did not enter					
1936	(Germany) Berlin	Did not enter								Did not enter					
1948	(United Kingdom) London	Did not enter								Did not enter					
1952	(Finland) Helsinki	Did not enter								Did not enter					
1956	(Australia) Melbourne	Did not enter								Did not enter					
1960	(Italy) Rome	Did not enter								Did not enter					
1964	(Japan) Tokyo	Did not enter								Did not enter					
1968	Mexico City	Did not enter								Did not enter					
1972	(West Germany) Munich	Did not enter								Did not enter					
1976	(Canada) Montreal	Did not enter								Did not enter					
1980	(Soviet Union) Moscow	Did not enter								Did not enter					
1984	(United States) Los Angeles	Did not qualify								8	3	1	4	8	10
1988	(South Korea) Seoul	Did not qualify								8	4	1	3	24	7
1992 to present		See New Zealand national under-23 team													
Total		Did not qualify								16	7	2	7	32	17

=== Minor tournaments ===
Year	Pos.	Pld	W	D	L	GF	GA
(New Zealand) 1922 Soccer Ashes	1st	3	2	1	0	7	3
(Australia) 1923 Soccer Ashes	1st	3	2	0	1	8	5
(Australia) 1933 Soccer Ashes	2nd	3	0	0	3	8	14
(New Zealand) 1936 Soccer Ashes	2nd	3	0	0	3	2	21
(New Zealand) 1948 Soccer Ashes	2nd	4	0	0	4	0	17
(Australia) 1954 Soccer Ashes	2nd	3	1	0	2	4	9
1967 South Vietnam Independence Cup	6th	3	1	0	2	7	11
(South Korea) 1976 President's Cup	4th	6	3	1	2	6	4
(Malaysia) 1980 Merdeka Tournament	5th	7	2	3	2	9	9
(Malaysia) 1981 Merdeka Tournament	5th	5	2	2	1	2	1
(New Zealand) (Australia) 1983 Trans-Tasman Cup	1st	2	2	0	0	4	1
(South Korea) 1983 President's Cup	9th	4	1	1	2	3	6
(New Zealand) (Australia) 1986 Trans-Tasman Cup	2nd	2	0	1	1	2	3
(Australia) (New Zealand) 1987 Trans-Tasman Cup	1st	2	1	1	0	2	1
(New Zealand) (Australia) 1988 Trans-Tasman Cup	2nd	2	0	0	2	1	4
(New Zealand) (Australia) 1991 Trans-Tasman Cup	2nd	2	0	0	2	1	3
(Chile) Copa Centenario del Fútbol Chileno	4th	3	0	0	3	4	8
(New Zealand) (Australia) 1995 Trans-Tasman Cup	2nd	2	0	1	1	0	3
(Australia) 1997 Four Nations Tournament	4th	3	0	0	3	1	7
(Thailand) 1999 Four Nations' Cup	4th	2	0	2	0	2	2
(China) 2000 Four Nations Tournament	4th	2	0	0	2	1	3
(Malaysia) 2000 Merdeka Tournament	1st	4	3	1	0	6	0
(Iran) 2003 AFC–OFC Challenge Cup	2nd	1	0	0	1	0	3
(Saudi Arabia) 2013 OSN Cup	2nd	2	1	0	1	1	2
(Japan) 2014 Kirin Challenge Cup		1	0	0	1	2	4
(Japan) 2017 Kirin Challenge Cup		1	0	0	1	1	2
(India) 2018 Intercontinental Cup	3rd	3	2	0	1	4	3
(England) 2023 Soccer Ashes	2nd	1	0	0	1	0	2
(Egypt) 2024 ACUD Cup	4th	2	0	1	1	0	1
(Canada) 2025 Canadian Shield	2nd	2	1	0	1	2	2
(Australia) (New Zealand) 2025 Soccer Ashes	2nd	2	0	0	2	1	4
(New Zealand) 2026 FIFA Series	2nd	2	1	0	1	4	3
(Japan) 2026 Kirin Cup Soccer	2nd	2	0	1	1	2	3
Total	5 Titles	87	25	15	48	97	152

== Honours ==
=== Intercontinental ===
- AFC–OFC Challenge Cup
  - (silver) Runners-up (1): 2003

=== Continental ===
- OFC Nations Cup
  - (gold) Champions (6): 1973, 1998, 2002, 2008, 2016, 2024
  - (silver) Runners-up (1): 2000
  - (bronze) Third place (2): 2004, 2012

=== Friendly ===
- Soccer Ashes (2): 1922, 1923
- Trans-Tasman Cup (2): 1983, 1987
- Merdeka Tournament (1): 2000

=== Awards ===
- FIFA Confederations Cup Fair Play Award (1): 1999
- OFC Nations Cup Fair Play Award (1): 2024

=== Summary ===
Competition	1st place, gold medalist(s)	2nd place, silver medalist(s)	3rd place, bronze medalist(s)	Total
OFC Nations Cup	6	1	2	9
AFC–OFC Challenge Cup	0	1	0	1
Total	6	2	2	10

== See also ==
- New Zealand women's national football team
- Association football in New Zealand
- Trans-Tasman Cup
- New Zealand national futsal team
- New Zealand women's national futsal team

Awards
Preceded by Valerie Adams	Halberg Awards – Supreme Award; 2010	Succeeded by All Blacks
Preceded by Eric Murray & Hamish Bond	New Zealand's Team of the Year; 2010	Succeeded by All Blacks
