= New Zealand men's national football team results (1970–1999) =

This page details the match results and statistics of the New Zealand men's national football team from 1970 until 1999.

== Key ==
Key to matches

- Att. = Match attendance
- (H) = Home ground
- (A) = Away ground
- (N) = Neutral ground

Key to record by opponent

- Pld = Games played
- W = Games won
- D = Games drawn
- L = Games lost
- GF = Goals for
- GA = Goals against

== A-International results ==
New Zealand's score is shown first in each case.

No.	Date	Venue	Opponents	Score	Competition	New Zealand scorers	Att.	Ref.
61	18 July 1971	Stade Numa-Daly Magenta, Nouméa (A)	New Caledonia	2–4	Friendly	Hastie, Brand	—	
62	20 July 1971	Stade Numa-Daly Magenta, Nouméa (A)	New Caledonia	1–2	Friendly	Tindall	—	
63	17 September 1972	Basin Reserve, Wellington (H)	New Caledonia	4–1	Friendly	Ormond (3), Vest	—	
64	30 September 1972	Newmarket Park, Auckland (H)	New Caledonia	2–1	Friendly	Ormond, Tindall	—	
65	9 October 1972	Gelora Senayan Main Stadium, Jakarta (N)	Australia	1–3	Friendly	Vest	2,000	
66	11 October 1972	Gelora Senayan Main Stadium, Jakarta (A)	Indonesia	1–1	Friendly	Taylor	—	
67	14 October 1972	Stade Numa-Daly Magenta, Nouméa (A)	New Caledonia	1–3	Friendly	Tillotson	—	
68	17 February 1973	Newmarket Park, Auckland (N)	Fiji	5–1	1973 Oceania Cup	B. Turner, Taylor, Brand, Bland, Vest	—	
69	18 February 1973	Newmarket Park, Auckland (N)	Tahiti	1–1	1973 Oceania Cup	Vest	—	
70	21 February 1973	Newmarket Park, Auckland (N)	New Caledonia	2–1	1973 Oceania Cup	Marley, Latimour	—	
71	23 February 1973	Newmarket Park, Auckland (N)	New Hebrides	3–1	1973 Oceania Cup	Bland, Hardman, Marley	—	
72	24 February 1973	Newmarket Park, Auckland (N)	Tahiti	2–0	1973 Oceania Cup	Taylor, Marley	—	
73	4 March 1973	Newmarket Park, Auckland (H)	Australia	1–1	1974 FIFA World Cup qualification	B. Turner	12,000	
74	11 March 1973	Sydney Sports Ground, Sydney (N)	Indonesia	1–1	1974 FIFA World Cup qualification	Vest	28,514	
75	13 March 1973	Sydney Sports Ground, Sydney (N)	Iraq	0–2	1974 FIFA World Cup qualification		12,763	
76	16 March 1973	Sydney Sports Ground, Sydney (A)	Australia	3–3	1974 FIFA World Cup qualification	Vest, Tindall (2)	14,071	
77	18 March 1973	Olympic Park Stadium, Melbourne (N)	Indonesia	0–1	1974 FIFA World Cup qualification		10,800	
78	24 March 1973	Sydney Sports Ground, Sydney (N)	Iraq	0–4	1974 FIFA World Cup qualification		12,930	
79	12 August 1973	Newmarket Park, Auckland (H)	Iran	0–0	Friendly		—	
80	20 July 1975	Newmarket Park, Auckland (H)	China	2–1	Friendly	Thomas, Taylor	5,000	
81	23 July 1975	Basin Reserve, Wellington (H)	China	2–2	Friendly	Thomas, Taylor	2,000	
82	26 July 1975	Queen Elizabeth II Park, Christchurch (H)	China	2–0	Friendly	Taylor (2)	6,000	
83	19 October 1975	Workers' Stadium, Beijing (A)	China	1–2	Friendly	Ormond	90,000	
84	5 November 1975	Canidrome, Macau (A)	Macau	1–1	Friendly	Mulgrew	2,000	
85	9 November 1975	National Stadium, Singapore (A)	Singapore	2–2	Friendly	Houghton (2)	30,000	
86	29 February 1976	Newmarket Park, Auckland (H)	Australia	0–1	Friendly		12,300	
87	2 March 1976	Olympic Park Stadium, Melbourne (A)	Australia	1–3	Friendly	Taylor	4,000	
88	13 September 1976	Dongdaemun Stadium, Seoul (N)	Burma	2–0	1976 President's Cup	Tindall, Malcolmson	—	
89	18 September 1976	Dongdaemun Stadium, Seoul (N)	Thailand	3–1	1976 President's Cup	B. Turner (2), Thomas	—	
90	23 September 1976	Dongdaemun Stadium, Seoul (N)	South Korea	0–2	1976 President's Cup		—	
91	2 October 1976	Stade Numa-Daly Magenta, Nouméa (A)	New Caledonia	1–2	Friendly	B. Turner	—	
92	5 March 1977	Newmarket Park, Auckland (H)	New Caledonia	3–0	Friendly	Campbell (2), Hough	—	
93	8 March 1977	Newmarket Park, Auckland (H)	New Caledonia	4–0	Friendly	Nelson (2), Campbell, Taylor	—	
94	19 March 1977	Newmarket Park, Auckland (H)	Taiwan	6–0	1978 FIFA World Cup qualification	Nelson (3), Campbell, Taylor, Weymouth	—	
95	23 March 1977	Newmarket Park, Auckland (A)	Taiwan	6–0	1978 FIFA World Cup qualification	Nelson (2), Sumner (3), Tsong (o.g.)	—	
96	27 March 1977	Sydney Cricket Ground, Sydney (A)	Australia	1–3	1978 FIFA World Cup qualification	Nelson	—	
97	30 March 1977	Newmarket Park, Auckland (H)	Australia	1–1	1978 FIFA World Cup qualification	Nelson	11,000	
98	1 October 1978	Singapore (A)	Singapore	2–0	Friendly	Simonsen, Nelson	—	
99	13 June 1979	Newmarket Park, Auckland (H)	Australia	1–0	Friendly	Ormond	4,000	
100	29 June 1979	Buckhurst Park, Suva (A)	Fiji	6–0	Friendly	Nelson (3), S. Rufer, Cole, B. Turner	—	
101	1 July 1979	Churchill Park, Lautoka (A)	Fiji	3–0	Friendly	Malcolmson, S. Rufer, C. Turner	—	
102	26 July 1979	Stade Numa-Daly Magenta, Nouméa (A)	New Caledonia	2–0	Friendly	Nelson, Sumner	—	
103	3 October 1979	Isa Town Stadium, Manama (A)	Bahrain	2–0	Friendly	Verweij, Campbell	—	
104	8 October 1979	Isa Town Stadium, Manama (A)	Bahrain	2–1	Friendly	B. Turner, Nelson	—	
105	19 February 1980	Buckhurst Park, Suva (A)	Fiji	1–1	Friendly	Elder	—	
106	21 February 1980	Churchill Park, Lautoka (A)	Fiji	2–0	Friendly	Elder (2)	—	
107	25 February 1980	Stade Numa-Daly Magenta, Nouméa (N)	Tahiti	1–3	1980 Oceania Cup	Sumner	—	
108	27 February 1980	Stade Numa-Daly Magenta, Nouméa (N)	Fiji	0–4	1980 Oceania Cup		—	
109	29 February 1980	Stade Numa-Daly Magenta, Nouméa (N)	Solomon Islands	6–1	1980 Oceania Cup	Groom, Armstrong (3), De Graaf (2)	—	
110	20 August 1980	Bill McKinlay Park, Auckland (H)	Mexico	4–0	Friendly	B. Turner (2), Wooddin, G. Turner	—	
111	15 September 1980	Empire Stadium, Vancouver (A)	Canada	0–4	Friendly		—	
112	18 September 1980	Edmonton (A)	Canada	0–3	Friendly		—	
113	16 October 1980	Stadium Merdeka, Kuala Lumpur (N)	Kuwait	5–1	1980 Merdeka Tournament	Baxter, Groom (2), Taylor, De Graaf	22,000	
114	19 October 1980	Stadium Merdeka, Kuala Lumpur (N)	South Korea	2–1	1980 Merdeka Tournament	Groom, De Graaf	28,000	
115	21 October 1980	Stadium Merdeka, Kuala Lumpur (N)	Indonesia	0–0	1980 Merdeka Tournament		12,000	
116	24 October 1980	Stadium Merdeka, Kuala Lumpur (N)	Burma	1–1	1980 Merdeka Tournament	Groom	8,500	
117	26 October 1980	Stadium Merdeka, Kuala Lumpur (N)	Morocco	0–3	1980 Merdeka Tournament		24,500	
118	28 October 1980	Stadium Merdeka, Kuala Lumpur (N)	Thailand	1–1	1980 Merdeka Tournament	De Graaf	14,500	
119	30 October 1980	Stadium Merdeka, Kuala Lumpur (N)	Malaysia	0–2	1980 Merdeka Tournament		48,000	
120	25 April 1981	Mount Smart Stadium, Auckland (H)	Australia	3–3	1982 FIFA World Cup qualification	G. Turner, Wooddin, Sumner	10,000	
121	3 May 1981	Govind Park, Ba (A)	Fiji	4–0	1982 FIFA World Cup qualification	B. Turner (3), Cole	—	
122	7 May 1981	Taipei Municipal Stadium, Taipei (A)	Chinese Taipei	0–0	1982 FIFA World Cup qualification		12,000	
123	11 May 1981	Gelora Senayan Main Stadium, Jakarta (A)	Indonesia	2–0	1982 FIFA World Cup qualification	B. Turner, G. Turner	47,000	
124	16 May 1981	Sydney Cricket Ground, Sydney (A)	Australia	2–0	1982 FIFA World Cup qualification	Wooddin, G. Turner	12,000	
125	23 May 1981	Mount Smart Stadium, Auckland (H)	Indonesia	5–0	1982 FIFA World Cup qualification	Wooddin, B. Turner, G. Turner (2), A. Elrick	4,742	
126	30 May 1981	Mount Smart Stadium, Auckland (H)	Chinese Taipei	2–0	1982 FIFA World Cup qualification	Wooddin, G. Turner	3,077	
127	16 August 1981	Mount Smart Stadium, Auckland (H)	Fiji	13–0	1982 FIFA World Cup qualification	Wooddin, Sumner (6), G.Turner (2), Cole, B. Turner (2), Mackay	3,345	
128	1 September 1981	Stadium Merdeka, Kuala Lumpur (N)	India	0–0	1981 Merdeka Tournament		24,000	
129	4 September 1981	Stadium Merdeka, Kuala Lumpur (N)	Malaysia	1–0	1981 Merdeka Tournament	Taylor	42,000	
130	7 September 1981	Stadium Merdeka, Kuala Lumpur (N)	Indonesia	0–0	1981 Merdeka Tournament		20,000	
131	10 September 1981	Stadium Merdeka, Kuala Lumpur (N)	United Arab Emirates	0–1	1981 Merdeka Tournament		14,000	
132	12 September 1981	Stadium Merdeka, Kuala Lumpur (N)	Japan	1–0	1981 Merdeka Tournament	Nelson	28,000	
133	24 September 1981	Workers' Stadium, Beijing (A)	China	0–0	1982 FIFA World Cup qualification		63,000	
134	3 October 1981	Mount Smart Stadium, Auckland (H)	China	1–0	1982 FIFA World Cup qualification	Herbert	27,000	
135	10 October 1981	Mount Smart Stadium, Auckland (H)	Kuwait	1–2	1982 FIFA World Cup qualification	Wooddin	21,101	
136	28 November 1981	Mount Smart Stadium, Auckland (H)	Saudi Arabia	2–2	1982 FIFA World Cup qualification	McClure, Herbert	—	
137	14 December 1981	Al-Qādisiyyah Stadium, Kuwait City (A)	Kuwait	2–2	1982 FIFA World Cup qualification	Sumner, W. Rufer	20,000	
138	19 December 1981	Prince Faisal bin Fahd Stadium, Riyadh (A)	Saudi Arabia	5–0	1982 FIFA World Cup qualification	W. Rufer (2), B. Turner (2), Wooddin	5,000	
139	10 January 1982	Jalan Besar Stadium, Singapore (N)	China	2–1	1982 FIFA World Cup qualification	Woodin, W. Rufer	60,000	
140	11 February 1982	Mount Smart Stadium, Auckland (H)	Hungary	1–2	Friendly	B. Turner	—	
141	14 February 1982	Queen Elizabeth II Park, Christchurch (H)	Hungary	1–2	Friendly	W. Rufer	13,000	
142	15 June 1982	Estadio La Rosaleda, Málaga (N)	Scotland	2–5	1982 FIFA World Cup	Sumner, Wooddin	36,000	
143	19 June 1982	Estadio La Rosaleda, Málaga (N)	Soviet Union	0–3	1982 FIFA World Cup		19,000	
144	23 June 1982	Estadio Benito Villamarín, Seville (N)	Brazil	0–4	1982 FIFA World Cup		43,000	
145	22 February 1983	Mount Smart Stadium, Auckland (H)	Australia	2–1	1983 Trans-Tasman Cup	Cresswell, Herbert	3,509	
146	27 February 1983	Olympic Park Stadium, Melbourne (A)	Australia	2–0	1983 Trans-Tasman Cup	Cole, Adam	14,000	
147	7 June 1983	Seoul Stadium, Seoul (N)	Ghana	2–0	1983 President's Cup	Herbert, G.Turner	—	
148	9 June 1983	Daegu Civic Stadium, Deagu (N)	Sudan	1–1	1983 President's Cup	Metzger	—	
149	16 August 1983	Buckhurst Park, Suva (A)	Fiji	0–2	Friendly		7,000	
150	18 August 1983	Prince Charles Park, Nadi (A)	Fiji	1–0	Friendly	Cresswell	8,000	
151	25 September 1983	Mount Smart Stadium, Auckland (H)	Japan	3–1	1984 Summer Olympics qualification	Sumner (2), Boath	3,093	
152	1 October 1983	Mount Smart Stadium, Auckland (H)	Chinese Taipei	2–0	1984 Summer Olympics qualification	Boath, G. Turner	3,899	
153	7 October 1983	National Stadium, Tokyo (A)	Japan	1–0	1984 Summer Olympics qualification	Sumner	20,000	
154	12 October 1983	Taipei Municipal Stadium, Taipei (A)	Chinese Taipei	1–1	1984 Summer Olympics qualification	Boath	8,000	
155	31 March 1984	Basin Reserve, Wellington (H)	Malaysia	2–0	Friendly	McClure, G. Turner	1,700	
156	3 April 1984	English Park, Christchurch (H)	Malaysia	6–1	Friendly	Boath (2), McClure (3), G. Turner	4,000	
157	8 April 1984	Mount Smart Stadium, Auckland (H)	Malaysia	0–0	Friendly		2,500	
158	15 April 1984	National Stadium, Singapore (N)	Saudi Arabia	1–3	1984 Summer Olympics qualification	Herbert	25,000	
159	19 April 1984	National Stadium, Singapore (N)	Kuwait	0–2	1984 Summer Olympics qualification		12,000	
160	22 April 1984	National Stadium, Singapore (N)	South Korea	0–2	1984 Summer Olympics qualification		27,000	
161	24 April 1984	National Stadium, Singapore (N)	Bahrain	0–1	1984 Summer Olympics qualification		20,000	
162	18 October 1984	Churchill Park, Lautoka (A)	Fiji	2–1	Friendly	Walker, Wooddin	3,000	
163	20 October 1984	National Stadium, Suva (A)	Fiji	1–1	Friendly	Dunford	—	
164	3 June 1985	Links Avenue, Mount Maunganui (H)	Fiji	5–0	Friendly	Walker (3), Hagan, Little	2,250	
165	5 June 1985	Childers Road Reserve, Gisborne (H)	Fiji	3–0	Friendly	Walker (2), Sumner	1,500	
166	7 June 1985	Bill McKinlay Park, Auckland (H)	Fiji	2–0	Friendly	Sumner, Own goal	1,000	
167	21 September 1985	Mount Smart Stadium, Auckland (H)	Australia	0–0	1986 FIFA World Cup qualification		14,826	
168	5 October 1985	Mount Smart Stadium, Auckland (A)	Chinese Taipei	5–1	1986 FIFA World Cup qualification	Edge, Walker, Sumner (3)	5,152	
169	12 October 1985	Queen Elizabeth II Park, Christchurch (H)	Chinese Taipei	5–0	1986 FIFA World Cup qualification	Boath, G. Turner (2), Walker (2)	5,200	
170	26 October 1985	Mount Smart Stadium, Auckland (H)	Israel	3–1	1986 FIFA World Cup qualification	W. Rufer, Dunford, Walker	10,600	
171	3 November 1985	Sydney Sports Ground, Sydney (A)	Australia	0–2	1986 FIFA World Cup qualification		21,910	
172	10 November 1985	Ramat Gan Stadium, Ramat Gan (A)	Israel	0–3	1986 FIFA World Cup qualification		4,500	
173	17 September 1986	Churchill Park, Lautoka (A)	Fiji	4–2	Friendly	Herbert (2), Evans, McGarry	12,000	
174	19 September 1986	National Stadium, Suva (A)	Fiji	2–1	Friendly	Evans, Barkley	8,000	
175	25 October 1986	Mount Smart Stadium, Auckland (H)	Australia	1–1	1986 Trans-Tasman Cup	Deeley	3,156	
176	2 November 1986	Parramatta Stadium, Sydney (A)	Australia	1–2	1986 Trans-Tasman Cup	Deeley	4,800	
177	2 September 1987	Olympic Park Stadium, Melbourne (A)	Australia	1–1	1987 Trans-Tasman Cup	Ironside	5,000	
178	9 September 1987	Hutt Recreation Ground, Lower Hutt (H)	Australia	1–0	1987 Trans-Tasman Cup	De Jong	5,000	
179	7 November 1987	Apia Park, Apia (A)	Western Samoa	7–0	1988 Summer Olympics qualification	Halford, McGarry, Halligan, Ironside (3), Deeley	2,500	
180	13 November 1987	Western Springs Stadium, Auckland (H)	Western Samoa	12–0	1988 Summer Olympics qualification	McGarry (3), Hagan (4), Halford, Deeley (3), Barkley	1,200	
181	6 March 1988	Olympic Park Stadium, Melbourne (N)	Chinese Taipei	1–0	1988 Summer Olympics qualification	Barkley	—	
182	9 March 1988	Hindmarsh Stadium, Adelaide (N)	Israel	0–2	1988 Summer Olympics qualification		7,000	
183	13 March 1988	Sydney Football Stadium, Sydney (A)	Australia	1–3	1988 Summer Olympics qualification	McGarry	—	
184	20 March 1988	Queen Elizabeth II Park, Christchurch (H)	Chinese Taipei	2–0	1988 Summer Olympics qualification	McGarry, Halford	—	
185	23 March 1988	Athletic Park, Wellington (H)	Australia	1–1	1988 Summer Olympics qualification	McGarry	—	
186	27 March 1988	Eden Park, Auckland (H)	Israel	0–1	1988 Summer Olympics qualification		1,500	
187	21 June 1988	Olympic Park Stadium, Melbourne (N)	Saudi Arabia	2–0	Friendly	McGarry, Own goal	—	
188	23 June 1988	Middle Park, Melbourne (N)	Saudi Arabia	3–2	Friendly	Lund, Wright, McGarry	—	
189	12 October 1988	Caledonian Ground, Dunedin (H)	Australia	1–2	1988 Trans-Tasman Cup	Ironside	3,000	
190	16 October 1988	Queen Elizabeth Oval, Bendigo (A)	Australia	0–2	1988 Trans-Tasman Cup		3,000	
191	14 November 1988	National Stadium, Suva (A)	Fiji	1–1	Friendly	Tuaa	6,000	
192	17 November 1988	Churchill Park, Lautoka (A)	Fiji	0–2	Friendly		—	
193	19 November 1988	Govind Park, Ba (A)	Fiji	0–1	Friendly		—	
194	11 December 1988	Newtown Park, Wellington (A)	Chinese Taipei	4–0	1990 FIFA World Cup qualification	Wright, McClennan, Barkley, Halligan	3,000	
195	15 December 1988	Western Springs Stadium, Auckland (H)	Chinese Taipei	4–1	1990 FIFA World Cup qualification	Wright, McClennan (3)	9,000	
196	5 March 1989	Ramat Gan Stadium, Ramat Gan (A)	Israel	0–1	1990 FIFA World Cup qualification		44,500	
197	12 March 1989	Sydney Football Stadium, Sydney (A)	Australia	1–4	1990 FIFA World Cup qualification	Dunford	13,621	
198	2 April 1989	Mount Smart Stadium, Auckland (H)	Australia	2–0	1990 FIFA World Cup qualification	Dunford, Wright	3,340	
199	9 April 1989	Mount Smart Stadium, Auckland (H)	Israel	2–2	1990 FIFA World Cup qualification	Dunford, Wright	3,200	
200	16 August 1990	Hutt Recreation Ground, Lower Hutt (H)	China	2–1	Friendly	Gray (2)	2,500	
201	24 August 1990	Western Springs Stadium, Auckland (H)	China	1–0	Friendly	Barkley	2,000	
202	12 May 1991	Queen Elizabeth II Park, Christchurch (H)	Australia	0–1	1991 Trans-Tasman Cup		8,000	
203	15 May 1991	Hindmarsh Stadium, Adelaide (A)	Australia	1–2	1991 Trans-Tasman Cup	Roberts	6,500	
204	3 June 1991	Mount Smart Stadium, Auckland (H)	England	0–1	Friendly		17,520	
205	3 June 1991	Athletic Park, Wellington (H)	England	0–2	Friendly		12,000	
206	7 June 1992	Auckland (H)	Fiji	3–0	1994 FIFA World Cup qualification	Wright (2), Halligan	4,917	
207	27 June 1992	Port Vila (A)	Vanuatu	4–1	1994 FIFA World Cup qualification	McClennan (2), Gray, Halligan	4,000	
208	1 July 1992	Auckland (H)	Vanuatu	8–0	1994 FIFA World Cup qualification	Laus (3), McGarry (2), Ironside, McClennan (2)	809	
209	19 September 1992	Nadi (A)	Fiji	0–0	1994 FIFA World Cup qualification		4,000	
210	18 April 1993	National Stadium, Singapore (N)	Saudi Arabia	1–3	Friendly	Ngata	—	
211	24 April 1993	National Stadium, Singapore (N)	Saudi Arabia	0–1	Friendly		—	
212	22 May 1993	McLean Park, Napier (H)	Fiji	2–0	Friendly	Halligan, Cotton	—	
213	24 May 1993	Palmerston North (H)	Fiji	5–0	Friendly	Wright (2), De Jong (2), Edge	—	
214	30 May 1993	Mount Smart Stadium, Auckland (H)	Australia	0–1	1994 FIFA World Cup qualification		10,952	
215	6 June 1993	Olympic Park Stadium, Melbourne (A)	Australia	0–3	1994 FIFA World Cup qualification		—	
216	21 February 1995	Seddon Park, Mount Maunganui (H)	Singapore	3–0	Friendly	M. Elrick, Elliott, McClennan	6,000	
217	9 June 1995	Stade Manu-ura, Papeete (A)	Tahiti	1–2	Friendly	McClennan	—	
218	16 June 1995	Estadio Regional de Antofagasta, Antofagasta (N)	Chile	1–3	Copa Centenario del Fútbol Chileno	Rennie	28,325	
219	20 June 1995	Estadio Municipal Francisco Sánchez Rumoroso, Coquimbo (N)	Turkey	1–2	Copa Centenario del Fútbol Chileno	Coveny	2,500	
220	22 June 1995	Estadio Nacional Julio Martínez Prádanos, Santiago (N)	Paraguay	2–3	Copa Centenario del Fútbol Chileno	Own goal, Jackson	—	
221	25 June 1995	Estadio Parque Artigas, Paysandú (A)	Uruguay	0–7	Friendly		22,000	
222	28 June 1995	Estadio Atilio Paiva Olivera, Rivera (A)	Uruguay	2–2	Friendly	McClennan, Jackson	28,000	
223	10 November 1995	Queen Elizabeth II Park, Christchurch (H)	Australia	0–0	1996 OFC Nations Cup		8,000	
224	15 November 1995	Breakers Stadium, Newcastle (A)	Australia	0–3	1996 OFC Nations Cup		8,858	
225	28 June 1996	Workers' Stadium, Beijing (A)	China	0–2	Friendly		40,000	
226	29 September 1996	Muscat (A)	Oman	1–0	Friendly	Viljoen	—	
227	1 October 1996	Muscat (A)	Oman	2–1	Friendly	Elliott, Gray	—	
228	3 October 1996	Prince Saud bin Jalawi Stadium, Khobar (A)	Saudi Arabia	0–3	Friendly		—	
229	5 October 1996	Doha (A)	Qatar	2–3	Friendly	W. Rufer (2)	—	
230	9 October 1996	Bourj Hammoud Stadium, Beirut (A)	Lebanon	1–1	Friendly	McClennan	10,000	
231	18 January 1997	Lakeside Stadium, Melbourne (A)	Australia	0–1	Four Nations Tournament		10,496	
232	22 January 1997	Lang Park, Brisbane (N)	Norway	0–3	Four Nations Tournament		10,000	
233	25 January 1997	Sydney Football Stadium, Sydney (N)	South Korea	1–3	Four Nations Tournament	Coveny	17,429	
234	31 May 1997	Sir Hubert Murray Stadium, Port Moresby (A)	Papua New Guinea	0–1	1998 FIFA World Cup qualification		3,000	
235	7 June 1997	Govind Park, Ba (A)	Fiji	1–0	1998 FIFA World Cup qualification	Jackson	5,500	
236	11 June 1997	North Harbour Stadium, Auckland (H)	Papua New Guinea	7–0	1998 FIFA World Cup qualification	Coveny (3), W. Rufer (2), Elliott, Stevens	4,000	
237	18 June 1997	North Harbour Stadium, Auckland (H)	Fiji	5–0	1998 FIFA World Cup qualification	W. Rufer (2), Coveny, Viljoen, Van Steeden	12,033	
238	28 June 1997	North Harbour Stadium, Auckland (H)	Australia	0–3	1998 FIFA World Cup qualification		25,000	
239	6 July 1997	Parramatta Stadium, Sydney (A)	Australia	0–2	1998 FIFA World Cup qualification		14,045	
240	21 September 1997	Gelora 10 November Stadium, Surabaya (A)	Indonesia	0–5	Friendly		5,000	
241	4 February 1998	Mount Smart Stadium, Auckland (H)	Chile	0–0	Friendly		8,000	
242	7 February 1998	Mount Smart Stadium, Auckland (H)	South Korea	0–1	Friendly		15,000	
243	25 September 1998	Lang Park, Brisbane (N)	Tahiti	1–0	1998 OFC Nations Cup	Paama (o.g.)	900	
244	28 September 1998	Lang Park, Brisbane (N)	Vanuatu	8–1	1998 OFC Nations Cup	Christie, Coveny (4), Ryan (2), Bunce	500	
245	2 October 1998	Lang Park, Brisbane (N)	Fiji	1–0	1998 OFC Nations Cup	Hay	1,000	
246	4 October 1998	Lang Park, Brisbane (N)	Australia	1–0	1998 OFC Nations Cup	Burton	2,000	
247	16 June 1999	Rajamangala Stadium, Bangkok (A)	Thailand	2–2 (3–4p)	Four Nations' Cup	Jackson (2)	20,000	
248	19 June 1999	Rajamangala Stadium, Bangkok (N)	Poland	0–0 (4–5p)	Four Nations' Cup		11,000	
249	22 June 1999	Sultan Qaboos Sports Complex, Muscat (A)	Oman	0–1	Friendly		—	
250	24 June 1999	Sultan Qaboos Sports Complex, Muscat (A)	Oman	2–2	Friendly	Ngata, Vicelich	—	
251	29 June 1999	National Stadium, Singapore	Singapore	1–0	Friendly	Coveny	—	
252	1 July 1999	Shah Alam Stadium, Shah Alam (A)	Malaysia	1–2	Friendly	Jackson	—	
253	3 July 1999	Kuala Lumpur (A)	Malaysia	5–1	Friendly	M. Elrick (2), Bouckenooghe, Urlovic, Wilkinson	—	
254	10 July 1999	Club Necaxa Training Ground, Mexico City (N)	Egypt	1–1	Friendly	Ngata	—	
255	15 July 1999	Las Chivas Ground, Guadalajara (N)	Egypt	0–1	Friendly		—	
256	24 July 1999	Estadio Jalisco, Guadalajara (N)	United States	1–2	1999 FIFA Confederations Cup	Zoricich	65,000	
257	28 July 1999	Estadio Jalisco, Guadalajara (N)	Germany	0–2	1999 FIFA Confederations Cup		42,000	
258	30 July 1999	Estadio Jalisco, Guadalajara (N)	Brazil	0–2	1999 FIFA Confederations Cup		53,000	

Notes

1. A: New Zealand played six matches at the 1976 President's Cup, however only three were against full international sides. The other three matches against Warna Agung and South Korea B (twice) are considered unofficial matches.
2. B: Despite being played in New Zealand, this was officially a home match for Taiwan.
3. C: New Zealand played four matches at the 1983 President's Cup, however only two were against full international sides. The other two matches against Yukong Elephants and PSV Eindhoven are considered unofficial matches.
4. D: At the request of the Chinese Taipei Football Association, their home match in qualifying for the 1986 FIFA World Cup was played in New Zealand.
5. E: Despite being played in New Zealand, this was officially a home match for Chinese Taipei.
6. F: The semi-finals of the 1996 OFC Nations Cup were also counted as the 1995 Trans-Tasman Cup.

== Best/worst results ==
New Zealand's best, worst, and highest scoring results from 1970 to 1999.

Best
Date	Opposition	Result
16 August 1981	Fiji	13–0
12 November 1987	Western Samoa	12–0
1 July 1992	Vanuatu	8–0
28 September 1998	Vanuatu	8–1
7 October 1987	Western Samoa	7–0
11 June 1997	Papua New Guinea	7–0

Worst
Date	Opposition	Result
25 June 1995	Uruguay	0–7
21 September 1997	Indonesia	0–5

Highest Aggregate
Date	Opposition	Result
16 August 1981	Fiji	13–0
12 November 1987	Western Samoa	12–0

== Streaks ==
- Most wins in a row
  - 7, 31 August 1958–4 June 1962
  - 7, 1 October 1978–8 October 1979
  - 6, 30 September 1951–16 September 1952
- Most matches without a loss
  - 11, 25 April 1981–7 September 1981
  - 10, 30 March 1977–21 February 1980
  - 9, 30 September 1951–14 August 1954
  - 9, 18 October 1984–26 October 1985
- Most draws in a row
  - 2, 4 March 1973–11 March 1973
  - 2, 5 November 1975–9 November 1975
  - 2, 21 October 1980–24 October 1980
  - 2, 28 November 1981–14 December 1981
  - 2, 28 June 1995–10 November 1995
  - 2, 16 June 1999–18 June 1999
- Most losses in a row
  - 16, 23 July 1927–19 September 1951
  - 7, 15 July 1999–21 January 2000
- Most matches without a win
  - 16, 23 July 1927–19 September 1951
  - 9, 9 June 1995–28 June 1996
  - 9, 10 July 1999–23 January 2000

== Results by opposition ==
Team	Pld	W	D	L	GF	GA	GD	WPCT
Australia	34	7	9	18	30	53	−23	20.59
Bahrain	3	2	0	1	4	2	+2	66.67
Brazil	2	0	0	2	0	6	−6	0.00
Canada	2	0	0	2	0	7	−7	0.00
Chile	2	0	1	1	1	3	−2	0.00
China	10	6	2	2	13	9	+4	60.00
Chinese Taipei (Note: Includes results as Taiwan.)	12	10	2	0	38	3	+35	83.33
Egypt	2	0	1	1	1	2	−1	0.00
England	2	0	0	2	0	3	−3	0.00
Fiji	27	19	4	4	72	17	+55	70.37
Germany	1	0	0	1	0	2	−2	0.00
Ghana	1	1	0	0	2	0	+2	100.00
Hungary	2	0	0	2	2	4	−2	0.00
India	1	0	1	0	0	0	0	0.00
Indonesia	8	2	4	2	9	8	+1	25.00
Iran	1	0	1	0	0	0	0	0.00
Iraq	2	0	0	2	0	6	−6	0.00
Israel	6	1	1	4	5	10	−5	16.67
Japan	3	3	0	0	5	1	+4	100.00
Kuwait	4	1	1	2	8	7	+1	25.00
Lebanon	1	0	1	0	1	1	0	0.00
Macau	1	0	1	0	1	1	0	0.00
Malaysia	7	4	1	2	15	6	+9	57.14
Mexico	1	1	0	0	4	0	+4	100.00
Morocco	1	0	0	1	0	3	−3	0.00
Myanmar (Note: Includes results as Burma.)	2	1	1	0	3	1	+2	50.00
New Caledonia	10	6	0	4	22	14	+8	60.00
Norway	1	0	0	1	0	3	−3	0.00
Oman	4	2	1	1	5	4	+1	50.00
Papua New Guinea	2	1	0	1	7	1	+6	50.00
Paraguay	1	0	0	1	2	3	−1	0.00
Poland	1	0	1	0	0	0	0	0.00
Qatar	1	0	0	1	2	3	−1	0.00
Samoa (Note: Includes results as Western Samoa.)	2	2	0	0	19	0	+19	100.00
Saudi Arabia	8	3	1	4	14	14	0	37.50
Scotland	1	0	0	1	2	5	−3	0.00
Singapore	4	3	1	0	8	2	+6	75.00
Solomon Islands	1	1	0	0	6	1	+5	100.00
South Korea	5	1	0	4	3	9	−6	20.00
Soviet Union	1	0	0	1	0	3	−3	0.00
Sudan	1	0	1	0	1	1	0	0.00
Tahiti	5	2	1	2	6	6	0	40.00
Thailand	3	1	2	0	6	4	+2	33.33
Turkey	1	0	0	1	1	2	−1	0.00
United Arab Emirates	1	0	0	1	0	1	−1	0.00
United States	1	0	0	1	1	2	−1	0.00
Uruguay	2	0	1	1	2	9	−7	0.00
Vanuatu (Note: Includes results as New Hebrides.)	4	4	0	0	23	3	+20	100.00
Total	198	84	40	74	344	245	+99	42.42

Source: A-International results

== Results by year ==
Per Year
Year	Pld	W	D	L	GF	GA	GD
1971	2	0	0	2	3	6	–3
1972	5	2	1	2	9	9	0
1973	12	4	5	3	18	16	+2
1975	6	2	3	1	10	8	+2
1976	6	2	0	4	7	9	–2
1977	6	4	1	1	21	4	+17
1978	1	1	0	0	2	0	+2
1979	6	6	0	0	16	1	+15
1980	15	5	4	6	23	25	–2
1981	19	10	7	2	44	10	+34
1982	6	1	0	5	6	17	–11
1983	10	7	2	1	15	6	+9
1984	9	3	2	4	12	11	+1
1985	9	6	1	2	23	7	+16
1986	4	2	1	1	7	6	+1
1987	4	3	1	0	21	1	+20
1988	15	6	2	7	20	18	+2
1989	4	1	1	2	5	7	–2
1990	2	2	0	0	3	1	+2
1991	4	0	0	4	1	6	–5
1992	4	3	1	0	15	1	+14
1993	6	2	0	4	8	8	0
1995	9	1	2	6	10	22	–12
1996	6	2	1	3	6	10	–4
1997	10	3	0	7	14	18	–4
1998	6	4	1	1	11	2	+9
1999	12	2	4	6	13	16	–3

Cumulative*
Year	Pld	W	D	L	GF	GA	GD
1971	62	25	5	32	147	179	–32
1972	67	27	6	34	156	188	–32
1973	79	31	11	37	174	204	–30
1975	85	33	14	38	184	212	–28
1976	91	35	14	42	191	221	–30
1977	97	39	15	43	212	225	–13
1978	98	40	15	43	214	225	–11
1979	104	46	15	43	230	226	+4
1980	119	51	19	49	253	251	+2
1981	138	61	26	51	297	261	+36
1982	144	62	26	56	303	278	+25
1983	154	69	28	57	318	284	+34
1984	163	72	30	61	330	295	+35
1985	172	78	31	63	353	302	+51
1986	176	80	32	64	360	308	+52
1987	180	83	33	64	381	309	+72
1988	195	89	35	71	401	327	+74
1989	199	90	36	73	406	334	+72
1990	201	92	36	73	409	335	+74
1991	205	92	36	77	410	341	+69
1992	209	95	37	77	425	342	+83
1993	215	97	37	81	433	350	+83
1995	224	98	39	87	443	372	+71
1996	230	100	40	90	449	382	+67
1997	240	103	40	97	463	400	+63
1998	246	107	41	98	474	402	+72
1999	258	109	45	104	487	418	+69

- Cumulative table includes all results prior to 1970.

== See also ==
- New Zealand national football team
- New Zealand at the FIFA World Cup
- New Zealand at the FIFA Confederations Cup
- New Zealand at the OFC Nations Cup
