= List of New Zealand men's national football team hat-tricks =

This page is a list of hat-tricks scored by the New Zealand men's national football team. Since New Zealand's first official international game on 17 June 1922 against Australia, there have been 42 recorded hat-tricks, with the first being scored George Campbell against Australia during the 1923 Soccer Ashes. The most goals scored in a single match is six, achieved by Steve Sumner against Fiji during 1982 FIFA World Cup qualification.

The record for the most hat-tricks scored for the New Zealand men's national football team is five, a record held solely by Vaughan Coveny. The team which New Zealand have scored the most hat-tricks against is Fiji, scoring eight different hat-tricks against them. The most separate hat-tricks scored in a single game is three, with Michael McGarry, Kevin Hagan and Andy Deeley all scoring hat-tricks against Western Samoa in a 12–0 win.

New Zealand have conceded eleven hat-tricks in total, with Australia scoring seven. The most goals scored in a single game by an individual is six, achieved by Frank Parsons in 1948. Frank Parsons also jointly holds the record, alongside George Smith, for the most hat-tricks scored against New Zealand with a total of three each.

== Hat-tricks scored by New Zealand ==
Scores and results list New Zealand's goal tally first.

| No. | Player | Date | Opponent | Venue | Goals | Result | Competition | Ref. |
|---|---|---|---|---|---|---|---|---|
| 1 | George Campbell | 16 June 1923 | Australia | Sydney Cricket Ground, Sydney, Australia | 3 | 3–2 | 1923 Soccer Ashes | |
| 2 | George Campbell (2) | 30 June 1923 | Australia | Newcastle Showground, Newcastle, Australia | 4 | 4–1 | 1923 Soccer Ashes | |
| 3 | Gordon Smith | 28 June 1947 | South Africa | Lancaster Park, Christchurch, New Zealand | 3 | 5–6 | Friendly | |
| 4 | Gordon Smith (2) | 12 July 1947 | South Africa | Athletic Park, Wellington, New Zealand | 3 | 3–8 | Friendly | |
| 5 | Jock Newall | 22 September 1951 | New Caledonia | Nouméa, New Caledonia | 4 | 6–4 | Friendly | |
| 6 | Roy Coxon | 4 October 1951 | New Hebrides | Nouméa, New Caledonia | 3 | 9–0 | Friendly | |
| 7 | Ivan Walsh | 4 October 1951 | New Hebrides | Nouméa, New Caledonia | 3 | 9–0 | Friendly | |
| 8 | Jock Newall (2) | 7 October 1951 | Fiji | Suva, Fiji | 3 | 6–4 | Friendly | |
| 9 | Jock Newall (3) | 14 September 1952 | Fiji | Churchill Park, Lautoka, Fiji | 3 | 9–0 | Friendly | |
| 10 | Jock Newall (4) | 28 September 1952 | Tahiti | Papeete, Tahiti | 4 | 5–3 | Friendly | |
| 11 | Bill Hume | 7 September 1958 | New Caledonia | Nouméa, New Caledonia | 3 | 5–1 | Friendly | |
| 12 | Ken Armstrong | 4 June 1962 | New Caledonia | Basin Reserve, Wellington, New Zealand | 3 | 4–2 | Friendly | |
| 13 | Colin Shaw | 16 November 1967 | Malaysia | Kuala Lumpur, Malaysia | 3 | 8–2 | Friendly | |
| 14 | Colin Shaw (2) | 17 September 1968 | Fiji | Newmarket Park, Auckland, New Zealand | 3 | 5–0 | Friendly | |
| 15 | Ian Ormond | 17 September 1972 | New Caledonia | Wellington, New Zealand | 3 | 4–1 | Friendly | |
| 16 | Earle Thomas | 4 October 1975 | Indonesia | Wellington, New Zealand | 4 | 8–0 | Friendly | |
| 17 | Keith Nelson | 20 March 1977 | Taiwan | Mount Smart Stadium, Auckland, New Zealand | 3 – (3', 6', 60') | 6–0 | 1978 FIFA World Cup qualification | |
| 18 | Steve Sumner | 23 March 1977 | Taiwan | Mount Smart Stadium, Auckland, New Zealand | 3 – (15', 51', 55') | 6–0 | 1978 FIFA World Cup qualification | |
| 19 | Keith Nelson (2) | 29 June 1979 | Fiji | Suva, Fiji | 3 | 6–0 | Friendly | |
| 20 | Mark Armstrong | 29 February 1980 | Solomon Islands | Nouméa, New Caledonia | 3 – (16', 65', 69') | 6–1 | 1980 Oceania Cup | |
| 21 | Brian Turner | 3 May 1981 | Fiji | Govind Park, Ba, Fiji | 3 – (8', 31', 85') | 4–0 | 1982 FIFA World Cup qualification | |
| 22 | Steve Sumner (2) | 16 August 1981 | Fiji | Mount Smart Stadium, Auckland, New Zealand | 6 – (8', 44', 55', 63', 74', 89') | 13–0 | 1982 FIFA World Cup qualification | |
| 23 | Billy McClure | 3 April 1984 | Malaysia | English Park, Christchurch, New Zealand | 3 – (35', 51', 89' pen) | 6–1 | Friendly | |
| 24 | Colin Walker | 3 June 1985 | Fiji | Mount Maunganui, New Zealand | 3 – (30', 64', 69') | 5–0 | Friendly | |
| 25 | Steve Sumner (3) | 5 October 1985 | Chinese Taipei | Mount Smart Stadium, Auckland, New Zealand | 3 – (31', 51', 89') | 5–1 | 1986 FIFA World Cup qualification | |
| 26 | Robert Ironside | 7 November 1987 | Western Samoa | Apia Park, Apia, Samoa | 3 – (65', 83', 85' pen) | 7–0 | 1988 OFC Men's Olympic Qualifying Tournament | |
| 27 | Michael McGarry | 13 November 1987 | Western Samoa | Western Springs Stadium, Auckland, New Zealand | 3 – (2' pen, 17', 37') | 12–0 | 1988 OFC Men's Olympic Qualifying Tournament | |
| 28 | Kevin Hagan | 13 November 1987 | Western Samoa | Western Springs Stadium, Auckland, New Zealand | 4 – (22' pen, 35', 43', 73') | 12–0 | 1988 OFC Men's Olympic Qualifying Tournament | |
| 29 | Andy Deeley | 13 November 1987 | Western Samoa | Western Springs Stadium, Auckland, New Zealand | 3 – (49' pen, 62', 71') | 12–0 | 1988 OFC Men's Olympic Qualifying Tournament | |
| 30 | Darren McClennan | 15 December 1988 | Chinese Taipei | Western Springs Stadium, Auckland, New Zealand | 3 – (17', 42', 49') | 4–1 | 1990 FIFA World Cup qualification | |
| 31 | Tony Laus | 1 July 1992 | Vanuatu | Eden Park, Auckland, New Zealand | 3 – (30', 32', 69') | 8–0 | 1994 FIFA World Cup qualification | |
| 32 | Vaughan Coveny | 11 June 1997 | Papua New Guinea | North Harbour Stadium, Auckland, New Zealand | 3 – (10', 13', 67') | 7–0 | 1998 FIFA World Cup qualification | |
| 33 | Vaughan Coveny (2) | 28 September 1998 | Vanuatu | Lang Park, Brisbane, Australia | 4 – (11', 25', 39', 40') | 8–1 | 1998 OFC Nations Cup | |
| 34 | Vaughan Coveny (3) | 6 June 2001 | Tahiti | North Harbour Stadium, Auckland, New Zealand | 3 – (41', 56', 71') | 5–0 | 2002 FIFA World Cup qualification | |
| 35 | Vaughan Coveny (4) | 13 June 2001 | Vanuatu | North Harbour Stadium, Auckland, New Zealand | 3 – (2', 7', 29') | 7–0 | 2002 FIFA World Cup qualification | |
| 36 | Chris Killen | 7 July 2002 | Papua New Guinea | North Harbour Stadium, Auckland, New Zealand | 4 – (9', 10', 28', 51') | 9–1 | 2002 OFC Nations Cup | |
| 37 | Vaughan Coveny (5) | 4 June 2004 | Tahiti | Marden Sports Complex, Adelaide, Australia | 3 – (6', 38', 46') | 10–0 | 2004 OFC Nations Cup | |
| 38 | Brent Fisher | 4 June 2004 | Tahiti | Marden Sports Complex, Adelaide, Australia | 3 – (16', 22', 63') | 10–0 | 2004 OFC Nations Cup | |
| 39 | Chris Wood | 10 June 2012 | Solomon Islands | Lawson Tama Stadium, Honiara, Solomon Islands | 3 – (10', 24', 29') | 4–3 | 2012 OFC Nations Cup | |
| 40 | Chris Wood (2) | 1 September 2017 | Solomon Islands | North Harbour Stadium, Auckland, New Zealand | 3 – (18', 36', 93') | 6–1 | 2018 FIFA World Cup qualification | |
| 41 | Chris Wood (3) | 18 November 2024 | Samoa | Mount Smart Stadium, Auckland, New Zealand | 3 – (28', 34', 60') | 8–0 | 2026 FIFA World Cup qualification | |
| 42 | Chris Wood (4) | 21 March 2025 | Fiji | Wellington Regional Stadium, Wellington, New Zealand | 3 – (6', 56', 60') | 7–0 | 2026 FIFA World Cup qualification | |

== Hat-tricks conceded by New Zealand ==
Scores and results list New Zealand's goal tally first.

| No. | Player | Date | Opponent | Venue | Goals | Result | Competition | Ref. |
|---|---|---|---|---|---|---|---|---|
| 1 | George Smith | 17 June 1933 | Australia | Sydney Cricket Ground, Sydney, Australia | 3 | 4–6 | 1933 Soccer Ashes | |
| 2 | George Smith (2) | 4 July 1936 | Australia | Logan Park, Dunedin, New Zealand | 4 | 1–7 | 1936 Soccer Ashes | |
| 3 | George Smith (3) | 11 July 1936 | Australia | Basin Reserve, Wellington, New Zealand | 5 | 0–10 | 1936 Soccer Ashes | |
| 4 | Donald Wilson | 5 July 1947 | South Africa | Dunedin, New Zealand | 3 | 0–6 | Friendly | |
| 5 | Donald Wilson (2) | 12 July 1947 | South Africa | Athletic Park, Wellington, New Zealand | 4 | 3–8 | Friendly | |
| 6 | Frank Parsons | 14 August 1948 | Australia | Basin Reserve, Wellington, New Zealand | 3 | 0–6 | 1948 Soccer Ashes | |
| 7 | Frank Parsons (2) | 28 August 1948 | Australia | Lancaster Park, Christchurch, New Zealand | 3 | 0–7 | 1948 Soccer Ashes | |
| 8 | Frank Parsons (3) | 11 September 1948 | Australia | Blandford Park, Auckland, New Zealand | 6 | 1–8 | 1948 Soccer Ashes | |
| 9 | Attila Abonyi | 5 November 1967 | Australia | Cộng Hòa Stadium, Ho Chi Minh City, Vietnam | 3 – (51', 75', 84') | 3–5 | 1967 South Vietnam Independence Cup | |
| 10 | Sabah Hatim | 24 March 1973 | Iraq | Sydney, Australia | 3 – (4', 15', 67') | 0–4 | 1974 FIFA World Cup qualification | |
| 11 | Fernando Torres | 14 June 2009 | Spain | Royal Bafokeng Stadium, Rustenburg, South Africa | 3 – (6', 14', 17') | 0–5 | 2009 FIFA Confederations Cup | |
