= Progression of New Zealand association football goalscoring record =

This is a progressive list of association footballers who have held or co-held the record for internationals goals scored for the New Zealand national football team, beginning with Ted Cook, who scored twice in the 3–1 victory against Australia in New Zealand's first international game.

== Criteria ==
The criteria used by national FAs in considering a match as a full international were not historically fixed. Particularly for the early decades, and until more recently for FAs outside UEFA and CONMEBOL, counts of goals were often considered unreliable. IFFHS and RSSSF have spent much effort trying to produce definitive lists of full international matches, and corresponding data on players' international caps and goals. This list contains records from only "A" internationals, as recognised by New Zealand Football.

== New Zealand ==
Player	Goals	Date	Venue	Opponent	Score	Notes
Ted Cook	2	17-06-1922	Dunedin	Australia	3–1	Cook scored twice in this match.
Ted Cook	3	08-07-1922	Auckland	Australia	3–1	
Ted Cook	4	24-06-1922	Wellington	Australia	1–1	
George Campbell	7	30-06-1923	Newcastle	Australia	4–1	Campbell scored four times in this match to overtake Cook.
Gordon Smith	7	19-07-1947	Auckland	South Africa	1–4	Smith scored to equal Campbell.
Jock Newall	9	07-10-1951	Suva	Fiji	6–4	Newall scored three times to overtake Smith.
Jock Newall	12	14-09-1952	Lautoka	Fiji	9–0	Newall scored three times.
Jock Newall	13	21-09-1952	Papeete	Tahiti	2–2	
Jock Newall	17	28-09-1952	Papeete	Tahiti	5–3	Newall scored four times.
Brian Turner	18	16-08-1981	Auckland	Fiji	13–0	Turner scored twice in this match to overtake Newall.
Brian Turner	20	19-12-1981	Riyadh	Saudi Arabia	5–0	Turner scored twice in this match.
Brian Turner	21	11-02-1982	Auckland	Hungary	1–2	
Steve Sumner	22	05-10-1985	Auckland	Chinese Taipei	5–1	Sumner scored three times to overtake Turner.
Vaughan Coveny	23	02-06-2004	Adelaide	Vanuatu	2–4	Coveny scored twice to overtake Sumner.
Vaughan Coveny	26	04-06-2004	Adelaide	Tahiti	10–0	Coveny scored three times.
Vaughan Coveny	27	06-06-2004	Adelaide	Fiji	2–0	
Vaughan Coveny	29	25-05-2006	Altenkirchen	Georgia	3–1	Coveny scored twice in this match.
Chris Wood	30	21-03-2022	Doha	Fiji	4–0	Wood scored twice to overtake Coveny.
Chris Wood	32	24-03-2022	Doha	New Caledonia	7–1	Wood scored twice in this match.
Chris Wood	33	30-03-2022	Doha	Solomon Islands	5–0	
Chris Wood	34	13-10-2023	Murcia	DR Congo	1–1	
Chris Wood	35	11-10-2024	Port Vila	Tahiti	3–0	
Chris Wood	36	14-10-2024	Auckland	Malaysia	4–0	
Chris Wood	38	15-11-2024	Hamilton	Vanuatu	8–1	Wood scored twice in this match.
Chris Wood	41	18-11-2024	Auckland	Samoa	8–0	Wood scored three times.
Chris Wood	44	21-03-2025	Wellington	Fiji	7–0	Wood scored three times.
Chris Wood	45	09-09-2025	Auckland	Australia	1–3	

== See also ==
- New Zealand men's national football team records and statistics
- List of international goals scored by Chris Wood
- List of New Zealand men's national football team hat-tricks
