= Winfield Challenge Shield =

The Winfield Challenge Shield was New Zealand Football's version of the Ranfurly Shield and was introduced to boost the interest in provincial football.

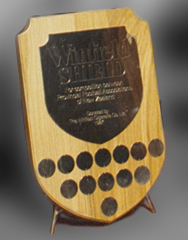
Winfield Challenge Shield

== History ==
The Winfield Challenge Shield was created in Auckland in 1988 to mark its centennial celebrations. It ran along similar lines to the Ranfurly Shield where the current holder would defend it against challenges from regional representative teams from throughout New Zealand. The original Auckland team was coached by John Adshead and they began the defence of the shield against Waikato at Bill McKinley Park - a game which they won 3-0.

Auckland squad: Peter Kuiper, Chris Milicich, Stuart Graham, Tom Mason, Ross Mackay, Martin Jennison, Ricki Herbert, Chris Riley, Rodger Gray, Billy Wright, Noel Barkley, Tony Levy, Darren McClennan, Kim Wright, Sean Hird. Coach: John Adshead. Asst: Dave Taylor

Waikato squad: Gary Dillistone, Bruce Williams, Brian Hayes, Chris Roberts, Dave Merrirr, Darren Powell, Paul Gemmell, Darren Melville, Lance Bauerfiend, Steve Tait, Mark Cossey, Graham Jones, Laurence Fitzpatrick, Marcus Gerbich, Graham Nobilo, Stuart Girvan. Coach: Roger Wilkinson. Asst: Ray Pooley.

=== Final Challenge ===
Auckland's fifth and final challenge of 1988 was against Otago, winners of the Keach Cup. Otago won 3-1 and took the shield back to Dunedin.

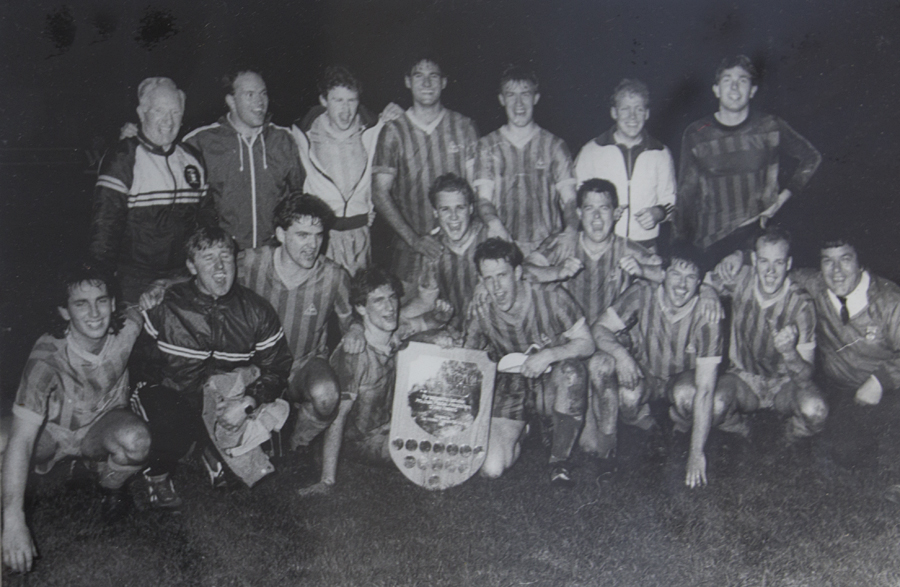
Otago wins the Winfield Challenge Shield

Auckland squad: Peter Kuiper, Chris Milicich, Stuart Graham, Tom Mason, Ross Mackay, Martin Jennison, Ricki Herbert, Chris Riley, Rodger Gray, Billy Wright, Noel Barkley, Tony Levy, Darren McClennan, Kim Wright, Sean Hird. Coach: John Adshead. Asst: Dave Taylor

Otago squad: David White, Craig Riddle, Rod Grove, David Woodard, Ian Boath, Andrew Kelly, Grant Plumbley, Graham Marshall, Peter Ryder, Michael McGarry, Steve Fleming, Darryl Hudson, Barry Still. Coach: John Wilkinson. Asst: Malcolm Evans

== Regulations ==
- the Winfield Shield is a challenge for provincial associations
- there is to be a minimum of 5 challenges in each season selected by from challenges lodged
