= 1988 OFC Men's Olympic Qualifying Tournament =

Tournament details
- Host country: Australia; New Zealand
- Dates: 15 November 1987 – 27 March 1988
- Teams: 7 (from 1 confederation)
- Venues: 6 (in 6 host cities)

Final positions
- Champions: Australia
- Runners-up: Israel
- Third place: New Zealand
- Fourth place: Chinese Taipei

Tournament statistics
- Matches played: 17
- Goals scored: 67 (3.94 per match)
- Top scorer(s): (New Zealand) Michael McGarry (7 Goals)

The 1988 OFC Men's Olympic Qualifying Tournament determined which Oceania Football Confederation (OFC) team would qualify directly to complete at the 1988 Summer Olympics men's football tournament.

The qualifications had two rounds. The first round had three teams per group, with the group winner going directly into the second round. The runner-up of each group completed in a one-way play-off to determine who participated in the second round. Israel qualified directly into the second round.

Before the first round begun, Papua New Guinea and Fiji pulled out, leaving each group with only two teams. It was decided to have two match playoffs instead.

== Participating teams ==
- Australia
- Chinese Taipei
- ~~Fiji~~ (Withdrew)
- Israel
- ~~Papua New Guinea~~ (Withdrew)
- New Zealand
- Western Samoa

== Venues ==
Australia			1988 OFC Men's Olympic Qualifying Tournament is located in Australia
Melbourne	Adelaide	Sydney	1988 OFC Men's Olympic Qualifying Tournament is located in Australia
Olympic Park Stadium	Hindmarsh Stadium	Sydney Football Stadium	1988 OFC Men's Olympic Qualifying Tournament is located in Australia
Capacity: 18,500	Capacity: 16,500	Capacity: 45,500	1988 OFC Men's Olympic Qualifying Tournament is located in Australia
New Zealand			1988 OFC Men's Olympic Qualifying Tournament is located in New Zealand
Christchurch	Wellington	Auckland	1988 OFC Men's Olympic Qualifying Tournament is located in New Zealand
Queen Elizabeth II Park	Athletic Park	Eden Park	1988 OFC Men's Olympic Qualifying Tournament is located in New Zealand
Capacity: 25,000	Capacity: 59,000	Capacity: 50,000	1988 OFC Men's Olympic Qualifying Tournament is located in New Zealand

== First round ==
=== Group 1 ===
Papua New Guinea withdraw before the games started

Team 1	Agg.	Team 2	1st leg	2nd leg
Chinese Taipei	0–6	Australia	0–3	0–3

15 November 1987

Chinese Taipei	0–3	Australia
	Report	Arnold 21', 50'; Farina 53'

Taipei, Taiwan
26 February 1988

Australia	3–0	Chinese Taipei
Arnold 36', 71'; Kuo-Feng Huang 60' (o.g.)	Report

Canberra Stadium, Canberra, Australia

=== Group 2 ===
Fiji withdraw before the games started

Team 1	Agg.	Team 2	1st leg	2nd leg
Western Samoa	0–19	New Zealand	0–7	0–12

7 November 1987

Western Samoa	0–7	New Zealand
	Report	Halford 7'; McGarry 35'; Halligan 64'; Ironside 65', 83', 85' (pen.); Deeley 76'

Apia Park, Apia, Western Samoa
Attendance: 2,500
13 November 1987

New Zealand	12–0	Western Samoa
McGarry 1', 16' (pen.), 37'; Hagan 22' (pen.), 35', 43', 73'; Halford 27'; Deeley 45' (pen.), 62', 71'; Barkley 76' (pen.)	Report

Western Springs Stadium, Auckland, New Zealand
Attendance: 1,200

=== Playoff ===
The losers of each group had a one-off match for a place in the second round.

Team 1	Score	Team 2
Chinese Taipei	5–0	Western Samoa

2 March 1988

Chinese Taipei	5–0	Western Samoa
Miao Chin-Chung 32', 50', 84'; Pan Yung-I 49'; Chien I-Shiu 80'	Report

St. George Stadium, Sydney, Australia

== Second round ==
=== Standings ===
Pos	Team	Pld	W	D	L	GF	GA	GD	Pts	Qualification	Australia	Israel	New Zealand	Chinese Taipei for Olympic games
1	Australia (H)	6	4	2	0	12	4	+8	10	Qualification for 1988 Summer Olympics	—	2–0	3–1	3–2
2	Israel	6	4	1	1	17	3	+14	9		0–0	—	2–0	5–1
3	New Zealand (H)	6	2	1	3	5	7	−2	5		1–1	0–1	—	2–0
4	Chinese Taipei	6	0	0	6	3	23	−20	0		0–3	0–9	0–1	—

Source: RSSSF
(H) Hosts

=== Matches ===
6 March 1988

Chinese Taipei	0–1	New Zealand
		Barkley (?)

Melbourne, Australia
6 March 1988

Australia	2–0	Israel
Yankos 71' (pen.); Farina 90+'

Melbourne, Australia

9 March 1988

Israel	2–0	New Zealand
Cohen 17'; Ivanir 55'

Adelaide, Australia
9 March 1988

Australia	3–2	Chinese Taipei
Tobin 21'; Crino 62'; Patikas 87'		Wu Chau-In 18'; Chien I-Shiu 86'

Adelaide, Australia

13 March 1988

Israel	5–1	Chinese Taipei
Brailovsky 7', 79'; Malmilian 14', 72'; Levine 28'		Chen Sing-An 64'

Sydney, Australia
13 March 1988

Australia	3–1	New Zealand
Patikas 39'; Crino 60'; Farina 64'		McGarry 56'

Sydney, Australia

20 March 1988

Israel	0–0	Australia

Christchurch, New Zealand
20 March 1988

New Zealand	2–0	Chinese Taipei
McGarry 27'; Halford 90+'

Christchurch, New Zealand

23 March 1988

Chinese Taipei	0–9	Israel
		Rosenthal 32'; Cohen 43'; Malmilian 50' (pen.); Levine 58', 60', 66'; Tikva 64', 82', 87'

Wellington, New Zealand
23 March 1988

New Zealand	1–1	Australia
McGarry 11' (pen.)		Farina 74'

Wellington, New Zealand

27 March 1988

New Zealand	0–1	Israel
		Levine 5'

Auckland, New Zealand
27 March 1988

Chinese Taipei	0–3	Australia
		Arnold 2'; Farina 19'; Wade 77'

Auckland, New Zealand
