= 1994 FIFA World Cup qualification (OFC) =

Tournament statistics
- Top scorer: (Australia) Carl Veart (5 goals)

Listed below are the dates and results for the 1994 FIFA World Cup qualification rounds for the Oceanian zone (OFC). For an overview of the qualification rounds, see the article 1994 FIFA World Cup qualification.

A total of seven teams entered the competition. However, Western Samoa withdrew. The Oceanian zone was allocated 0.25 places (out of 24) in the final tournament.

== Format ==
There would be two rounds of play:

- First round: The six teams were divided into two groups of three teams each. The three teams would play against each other on a home-and-away basis. The group winners would advance to the final round.
- Final round: The two teams would play against each other on a home-and-away basis. The winner would advance to the CONCACAF–OFC intercontinental play-off.

== First round ==
=== Group A ===
Pos	Team	Pld	W	D	L	GF	GA	GD	Pts	Australia men's national soccer team	Tahiti national football team	Solomon Islands national football team
1	Australia	4	4	0	0	13	2	+11	8	—	2–0	6–1
2	Tahiti	4	1	1	2	5	8	−3	3	0–3	—	4–2
3	Solomon Islands	4	0	1	3	5	13	−8	1	1–2	1–1	—

Source: FIFA
11 July 1992

Solomon Islands	1–1	Tahiti
Duddley Hatei 61'	Report	Eric Etaeta 76'

Honiara, Solomon Islands
Attendance: 2,000
Referee: Prakash Chandra (Fiji)

4 September 1992

Solomon Islands	1–2	Australia
Hollies Vato 83'	Report	Carl Veart 8'; Tom McCulloch 86'

Honiara, Solomon Islands
Attendance: 8,000
Referee: Gary Fleet (New Zealand)

11 September 1992

Tahiti	0–3	Australia
	Report	Damian Mori 2'; Carl Veart 44'; Paul Wade 57'

Papeete, French Polynesia
Attendance: 3,185
Referee: Lennox Sharp (New Zealand)

20 September 1992

Australia	2–0	Tahiti
Carl Veart 11'; Mehmet Durakovic 62'	Report

Brisbane, Australia
Referee: Kaltatak Kalokis (Vanuatu)

26 September 1992

Australia	6–1	Solomon Islands
Aytec Genc 4'; Ian Gray 60'; Paul Wade 67'; Carl Veart 83'; Greg Brown 85'; Mehmet Durakovic 88'	Report	Charles Ashley 6'

Newcastle, Australia
Referee: Intaz Shan (Fiji)

9 October 1992

Tahiti	4–2	Solomon Islands
Reynald Temarii 8' (pen.); Jean-Loup Rousseau 18'; Maheanum Gatien 43', 88'	Report	Hollies Vato 60'; Batram Suri 90'

Papeete, French Polynesia
Referee: Barry Tasker (New Zealand)

Australia advanced to the final round.

=== Group B ===
Pos	Team	Pld	W	D	L	GF	GA	GD	Pts	New Zealand men's national football team	Fiji national football team	Vanuatu national football team
1	New Zealand	4	3	1	0	15	1	+14	7	—	3–0	8–0
2	Fiji	4	2	1	1	6	3	+3	5	0–0	—	3–0
3	Vanuatu	4	0	0	4	1	18	−17	0	1–4	0–3	—

Source: FIFA
7 June 1992

New Zealand	3–0	Fiji
Billy Wright 15', 50'; Danny Halligan 42'	Report

Christchurch, New Zealand
Attendance: 4,917
Referee: John McConnell (Australia)

27 June 1992

Vanuatu	1–4	New Zealand
Charles Vatú 26'	Report	Darren McClennan 2', 3'; Rodger Gray 74'; Danny Halligan 82' (pen.)

Port Vila, Vanuatu
Attendance: 4,000
Referee: Trompette Guy (Tahiti)

1 July 1992

New Zealand	8–0	Vanuatu
Tony Laus 30', 32', 69'; Michael McGarry 33', 71'; Robert Ironside 64'; Darren McClennan 67', 72'	Report

Auckland, New Zealand
Attendance: 809
Referee: Spiers Peter (Australia)

12 September 1992

Fiji	3–0	Vanuatu
Bakalevu Moceimereke 65', 69', 75'	Report

Suva, Fiji
Referee: John Fraser (Australia)

19 September 1992

Fiji	0–0	New Zealand
	Report

Suva, Fiji
Referee: John Fraser (Australia)

26 September 1992

Vanuatu	0–3	Fiji
	Report	Kaliova Bulinaceva 15'; Radike Nawasu 33', 77'

Port Vila, Vanuatu
Referee: Gary Power (Australia)

New Zealand advanced to the final round.

== Second round ==
Team 1	Agg.	Team 2	1st leg	2nd leg
New Zealand	0–4	Australia	0–1	0–3

== Inter-confederation play-offs ==
=== First round ===
The winning team of the OFC qualification tournament played against CONCACAF group runners-up in a home-and-away play-off. The winner of this play-off qualified for the second play-off.

Team 1	Agg.	Team 2	1st leg	2nd leg
Canada	3–3 (1–4 p)	Australia	2–1	1–2 (a.e.t.)

=== Second round ===
The winning team of the first play-off played against CONMEBOL group one runners-up in a home-and-away play-off. The winner of this play-off qualified for the 1994 FIFA World Cup finals.

Team 1	Agg.	Team 2	1st leg	2nd leg
Australia	1–2	Argentina	1–1	0–1

== Goalscorers ==
5 goals

- (Australia) Carl Veart

4 goals

- (New Zealand) Darren McClennan

3 goals

- (Australia) Mehmet Duraković
- (Fiji) Bakalevu Moceimereke
- (New Zealand) Tony Laus

2 goals

- (Australia) Aurelio Vidmar
- (Australia) Paul Wade
- (Fiji) Radike Nawasu
- (New Zealand) Danny Halligan
- (New Zealand) Michael McGarry
- (New Zealand) Billy Wright
- (Solomon Islands) Hollies Vato
- (French Polynesia) Maheanum Gatien

1 goal

- (Australia) Graham Arnold
- (Australia) Greg Brown
- (Australia) Frank Farina
- (Australia) Aytec Genç
- (Australia) Ian Gray
- (Australia) Tom McCulloch
- (Australia) Damian Mori
- (Australia) Ned Zelic
- (Fiji) Kaliova Bulinaceva
- (New Zealand) Rodger Gray
- (New Zealand) Robert Ironside
- (Solomon Islands) Charles Ashley
- (Solomon Islands) Duddley Hatei
- (Solomon Islands) Batram Suri
- (French Polynesia) Eric Etaeta
- (French Polynesia) Jean-Luc Rousseau
- (French Polynesia) Reynald Temarii
- (Vanuatu) Charles Vatú

1 own goal

- (Australia) Alex Tobin (playing against Argentina)
