= 1986 FIFA World Cup qualification (OFC) =

Tournament details
- Dates: 3 September – 10 November 1985
- Teams: 4 (from 2 confederations)

Tournament statistics
- Matches played: 14
- Goals scored: 51 (3.64 per match)
- Attendance: 270,523 (19,323 per match)
- Top scorer(s): (Australia) John Kosmina (Australia) Dave Mitchell (Israel) Zahi Armeli (5 Goals)

The Oceanian (OFC) qualification rounds for the 1986 FIFA World Cup took place between 3 September and 10 November 1985. Four teams entered the competition for a play-off against a team from Europe (UEFA) to qualify for the finals in Mexico.

Due to political constraints, two teams geographically in Asia – Chinese Taipei and Israel – contested the Oceanian qualifiers.

Following the round robin qualifying tournament, Australia advanced to the UEFA–OFC play-off. In the play-off, Australia lost to Scotland so no teams from Oceania qualified for the World Cup.

== Background ==
Teams from Oceania first took part in qualification for the FIFA World Cup in 1966 when Australia entered. In 1974, Australia also became the first team from Oceania to qualify after defeating South Korea in the final round of qualification. Oceanian teams had limited experience at the World Cup after only Australia in 1974 and New Zealand in 1982 had qualified for the finals.

In 1974, both the Israel Football Association and the Republic of China Football Association were expelled from the Asian Football Confederation (AFC). For qualification to the 1986 FIFA World Cup, FIFA placed Chinese Taipei and Israel in the Oceania section.

== Format ==
Four teams took part in the competition. They contested a double round robin group. The winner would advance to the UEFA–OFC play-off.

=== Participants ===
- Australia
- Chinese Taipei
- Israel
- New Zealand

== Summary ==
Chinese Taipei did not play any of their matches at home and instead played their nominated home matches in the respective countries of their opponents.

The competition began in September 1985 when Israel recorded back-to-back wins over Chinese Taipei, 11–0 on aggregate. New Zealand then drew goalless with Australia on 21 September before winning 5–1 against Chinese Taipei on 5 October. Australia defeated Israel 2–1 three days later in Ramat Gan and New Zealand defeated Chinese Taipei 5–0 on 12 October. With half the matches played, New Zealand were top of the standings with five points, one ahead of Israel and two ahead of Australia. Chinese Taipei had no points from their opening four matches and were no longer able to qualify.

On 20 October, Australia and Israel drew 1–1. Australia then went top of the standings after defeating Chinese Taipei 7–0 three days later. On October 26, New Zealand defeated Israel 3–1 and, in their final match, Chinese Taipei lost 8–0 to Australia the following day. As a result, Israel were eliminated and the match between Australia and New Zealand in Sydney on 3 November would ultimately prove decisive.

Goals from John Kosmina and Dave Mitchell helped Australia to a 2–0 win and gave them an unassailable lead at the top of the standings. In the final dead rubber match, Israel defeated New Zealand 3–0.

== Standings ==
Pos	Team	Pld	W	D	L	GF	GA	GD	Pts	Qualification	Australia	Israel	New Zealand	Chinese Taipei for Olympic games
1	Australia	6	4	2	0	20	2	+18	10	Advance to UEFA–OFC play-off	—	1–1	2–0	8–0
2	Israel	6	3	1	2	17	6	+11	7		1–2	—	3–0	5–0
3	New Zealand	6	3	1	2	13	7	+6	7		0–0	3–1	—	5–0
4	Chinese Taipei	6	0	0	6	1	36	−35	0		0–7	0–6	1–5	—

== Matches ==
3 September 1985

Chinese Taipei	0–6	Israel
		Turk 28', 35', 74'; Armeli 39'; Malmilian 53', 90'

Ramat Gan Stadium, Ramat Gan, Israel
Attendance: 30,000
Referee: Mircea Salomir (Romania)
8 September 1985

Israel	5–0	Chinese Taipei
A. Cohen 7'; Armeli 18'; Ohana 56', 72', 79'

Ramat Gan Stadium, Ramat Gan
Attendance: 10,000
Referee: Ioan Igna (Romania)
21 September 1985

New Zealand	0–0	Australia

Mount Smart Stadium, Auckland
Attendance: 14,286
Referee: Keith Hackett (England)
5 October 1985

Chinese Taipei	1–5	New Zealand
Sing-an 41'		Edge 13'; Walker 25'; Sumner 31' (pen.), 51', 89'

Mount Smart Stadium, Auckland, New Zealand
Attendance: 5,152
Referee: Chris Bambridge (Australia)
8 October 1985

Israel	1–2	Australia
Armeli 65'		Mitchell 46'; Kosmina 50'

Ramat Gan Stadium, Ramat Gan
Attendance: 45,000
Referee: Luigi Agnolin (Italy)
12 October 1985

New Zealand	5–0	Chinese Taipei
Boath 19'; Turner 32', 76'; Walker 57', 65' (pen.)

Queen Elizabeth II Park, Christchurch
Attendance: 5,200
Referee: Don Campbell (Australia)
20 October 1985

Australia	1–1	Israel
Ratcliffe 32'		A. Cohen 47'

Olympic Park, Melbourne
Attendance: 27,000
Referee: José Rosa dos Santos (Portugal)
23 October 1985

Chinese Taipei	0–7	Australia
		Dunn 2', 89' (pen.); Chiang 13' (o.g.); Mitchell 57', 59', 87'; Arnold 68'

Hindmarsh Stadium, Adelaide, Australia
Attendance: 2,000
Referee: John Cameron (New Zealand
26 October 1985

New Zealand	3–1	Israel
Rufer 3'; Dunford 30'; Walker 67'		Armeli 23'

Mount Smart Stadium, Auckland
Attendance: 10,600
Referee: Egbert Mulder (Netherlands)
27 October 1985

Australia	8–0	Chinese Taipei
Odžakov 41', 56', 69'; Crino 52'; Kosmina 65' (pen.), 72', 88'; Gray 89'

St George Stadium, Sydney
Attendance: 2,694
Referee: Bill Munro (New Zealand)
3 November 1985

Australia	2–0	New Zealand
Kosmina 12'; Mitchell 48'

Sydney Sports Ground, Sydney
Attendance: 21,910
Referee: Gerard Guerds (Netherlands)
10 November 1985

Israel	3–0	New Zealand
N. Cohen 67'; Selecter 75'; Armeli 85'

Ramat Gan Stadium, Ramat Gan
Attendance: 4,500
Referee: Dieter Pauly (West Germany)

== Aftermath ==
The winner of the OFC qualification section was required to face a team from the UEFA qualification section for a place at the 1986 FIFA World Cup. Australia were paired against Scotland in the two-legged play-off which would take place in November and December 1985. Davie Cooper and Frank McAvennie scored as Scotland recorded a 2–0 win at Hampden Park in the first leg before the teams played out a goalless draw in the second leg in Melbourne. As a result, Scotland qualified for the 1986 FIFA World Cup.

Team 1	Agg.	Team 2	1st leg	2nd leg
Scotland	2–0	Australia	2–0	0–0

== Goalscorers ==
There were 51 goals scored in 12 matches, for an average of 4.25 goals per match.

5 goals

- (Australia) John Kosmina
- (Australia) Dave Mitchell
- (Israel) Zahi Armeli

4 goals

- (New Zealand) Colin Walker

3 goals

- (Australia) Žarko Odžakov
- (Israel) Eli Ohana
- (Israel) Rifaat Turk
- (New Zealand) Steve Sumner

2 goals

- (Australia) Robbie Dunn
- (Israel) Avi Cohen
- (Israel) Uri Malmilian
- (New Zealand) Grant Turner

1 goal

- (Australia) Graham Arnold
- (Australia) Oscar Crino
- (Australia) Ian Gray
- (Australia) David Ratcliffe
- (Chinese Taipei) Chen Sing-an
- (Israel) Nissim Cohen
- (Israel) Moshe Selecter
- (New Zealand) Allan Boath
- (New Zealand) Malcolm Dunford
- (New Zealand) Declan Edge
- (New Zealand) Wynton Rufer

1 own goal

- (Chinese Taipei) Chun Keui Chiang (playing against Australia)
