= Dave Mitchell (soccer) =

Soccer player (born 1962)

Personal information
- Full name: David Stuart Mitchell
- Date of birth: 13 June 1962 (age 64)
- Place of birth: Glasgow, Scotland
- Position: Striker

Youth career
- Adelaide City
- Sydney City

Senior career*
Years	Team	Apps	(Gls)
1980–1983	Adelaide City	40	(15)
1983–1985	Rangers	26	(6)
1985	Seiko	6	(5)
1985–1987	Eintracht Frankfurt	35	(5)
1987–1989	Feyenoord	40	(12)
1989–1991	Chelsea	7	(0)
1990	→ NEC (loan)	6	(0)
1991	→ Newcastle United (loan)	2	(1)
1991–1993	Swindon Town	68	(19)
1993	Altay Izmir	3	(0)
1993–1995	Millwall	55	(15)
1995–1996	Selangor		(14)
1996–1997	Sydney Olympic	9	(1)
1997–1999	Sydney United	24	(6)

International career
1981	Australia U-20		
1981–1993	Australia	27	(11)

Managerial career
- 1995–1996: Sydney Olympic
- 1996–1999: Sydney United
- 1999–2001: Parramatta Power
- 2005: Sarawak
- 2006–2007: Perth Glory (Assistant)
- 2007–2010: Perth Glory
- 2013–2014: Kedah FA
- * Club domestic league appearances and goals

David Stuart Mitchell (born 13 June 1962) is a Scottish Australian former professional association footballer who most recently worked as head coach of Malaysian Premier League club Kedah FA. A powerful striker, he is remembered as one of the pioneers for Australian players in Europe, appearing in the Bundesliga, the Eredivisie, Scottish Premier League, Süper Lig, as well as the top-flight and second tier in England. In Asia, he played for clubs in Hong Kong and Malaysia.

Mitchell played for overseas clubs for more than a dozen years before returning to Australia to coach Sydney Olympic, Sydney United and Parramatta Power in the National Soccer League. Born in Scotland, he played for the Australia national team at international level. He played 44 times for the national team, scoring a total of 14 goals and a number of assists, and appearing in the 1988 Summer Olympic Games in Seoul.

He was the assistant manager to Ron Smith at A-League club Perth Glory before taking the top position after Smith's sacking, helping the club end its winless streak.

== Playing career ==
Mitchell was born in Glasgow, but moved to Adelaide as a young child. He bought out his own contract at Adelaide City so he could join Rangers, the club that his family supported, in 1983. He broke into the first team at the same time as acclaimed Scotland striker Ally McCoist. Both he and McCoist scored their first goals for the club in the same Scottish League Cup game and he also represented the Glasgow club on the European stage.

In 1985, Mitchell became the first Australian to feature in the Bundesliga, playing for two seasons for Eintracht Frankfurt. He also played for Dutch football club Feyenoord—appearing in the UEFA Cup—before securing a move to Chelsea in the top flight of English football. He also played – and scored – on-loan for Newcastle United becoming first Aussie to play and score for the famous North-East club.

Playing in the second-tier of English football, he had spells at Swindon Town where he played with Glenn Hoddle and helped them earn promotion to the English Premier League and Millwall where he scored 15 league goals in 55 games. He then moved to Malaysia and scored the winner in the 1995 Malaysia Cup final; this was a golden goal, the first golden goal to be scored in a Malaysia Cup final.

Mitchell finished his career with Australian clubs Sydney Olympic and Sydney United as he transitioned into coaching.

== Managerial career ==
Mitchell's coaching career in the NSL spanned six seasons and 154 matches, in which he recorded 68 wins, 31 draws and 55 losses. When he returned from playing in Europe he was a player/coach for clubs Sydney Olympic and Sydney United. Some of his coaching achievements include a Grand Final appearance in 1998–99 with Sydney United and also being the inaugural coach of Parramatta Power in 1999–2000.

Mitchell was appointed interim head coach of Perth Glory after the sacking of Ron Smith in November 2007 and was then given a contract until March 2009. It was further extended to the end of the 2010–11 season in November 2008. Some of his major achievements while manager of Perth Glory was to sign key international players including Robbie Fowler and Andy Todd.

Mitchell stepped down as Perth Glory coach during the 2010–11 A-League season after an unbeaten run of five games until his side conceded four consecutive losses. He decided to move to the role of Director of Football. Mitchell then moved Ian Ferguson to the head coaching role to replace himself. Both positions were for the 2010–11 and 2011–12 seasons. On 4 March 2011, Mitchell was released from his contract from the club after the role was deemed redundant after an independent review of football operations at Perth Glory.

In November 2013, Malaysian Premier League club Kedah FA announced on its website that Mitchell had been appointed head coach and was preparing for the 2014 Premier League season. But despite the Red Eagles' solid start to the 2014 campaign and a Malaysia FA Cup quarterfinal appearance, he was sacked in April due to political in-fighting within the club.

2014 worked as a pundit for Astro TV for the EPL in Malaysia and also for the Brazil World cup 2014

2015 he was engaged by Mike Charlsworth the owner of Central Coast Mariners FC in the Australian A League as GM of Asia. This was for possible connections and joint ventures in the growing Asia market.

Worked with Frenz United in Malaysia with ex Liverpool legend Steve McMahon to help bring the under 19's of Frenz United to the final of the Asian Championship trophy where they were defeated by a robust and tough Japanese team Kashima Antlers in the final.

2015 – 2016 in the past Mitchell has also worked as a scout for Feyenoord Rotterdam and is currently their Asian Ambassador for the club.

2016 worked for Astro TV as a pundit for the EPL

2017 worked for ESPNFC as a pundit for Australia's 2018 World Cup playoff against Syria.

== Career statistics ==
Scores and results list goal tally first.

No	Date	Venue	Opponent	Score	Result	Competition
1	14 August 1981	Olympic Park Stadium	Fiji	1–0	10–0	1982 FIFA World Cup qualification (AFC and OFC)
2	14 August 1981	Olympic Park Stadium	Fiji	2–0	10–0	1982 FIFA World Cup qualification (AFC and OFC)
3	14 August 1981	Olympic Park Stadium	Fiji	10–0	10–0	1982 FIFA World Cup qualification (AFC and OFC)
4	13 October 1982	Singapore National Stadium	Indonesia	0-1	0-2	Merlion Cup
5	13 October 1982	Singapore National Stadium	Indonesia	0-2	0-2	Merlion Cup
6	17 October 1982	Singapore National Stadium	South Korea	0-2	0-2	Merlion Cup
7	8 October 1985	Ramat Gan Stadium	Israel	0-1	1-2	1986 FIFA World Cup qualification (OFC)
8	23 October 1985	Hindmarsh Stadium	Taiwan	3-0	7-0	1986 FIFA World Cup qualification (OFC)
9	23 October 1985	Hindmarsh Stadium	Taiwan	4-0	7-0	1986 FIFA World Cup qualification (OFC)
10	23 October 1985	Hindmarsh Stadium	Taiwan	6-0	7-0	1986 FIFA World Cup qualification (OFC)
11	3 November 1985	Sydney Sports Ground	New Zealand	2-0	2-0	1986 FIFA World Cup qualification (OFC)

== Managerial statistics ==
As of 19 December 2016.

Team	From	To	Record				
Team	From	To	G	W	D	L	Win %
Perth Glory	2007	2010	68	24	14	30	35.29
Total			68	24	14	30	35.29

== Honours ==
=== Player ===
Rangers

- Scottish League Cup: 1984–85

Seiko

- Hong Kong League: 1984–85
- Viceroy Cup: 1984–85

Swindon Town

- Football League First Division play-offs: 1993

Selangor

- Malaysia Cup: 1995

Australia

- Trans-Tasman Cup: 1983
- Merlion Cup: 1982

Individual

- FFA Hall of Fame: 2006 inductee
- FSA Hall of Champions: 2007 inductee
- NSL U21 Player of the Year: 1980–81 (Papasavas Medal)

=== Manager ===
Sydney United

- NSL Premiership: 1998–99

Individual

- NSL Coach of the Year: 1998–99
