= Avi Cohen =

Israeli footballer (1956–2010)

Avi Cohen אבי כהן
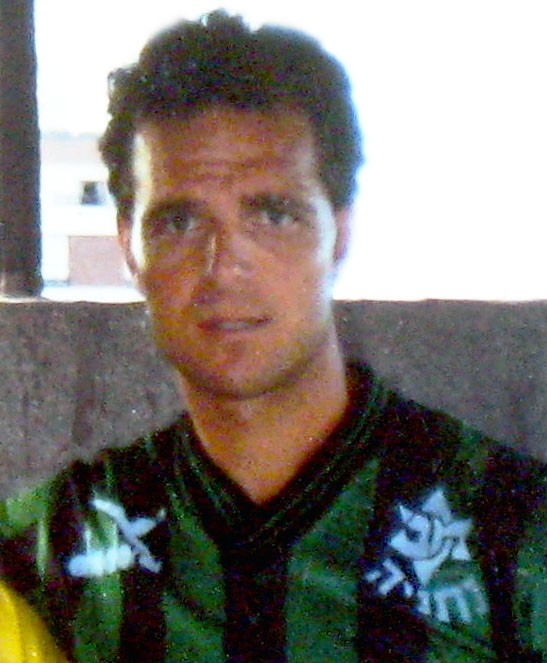
- Cohen in 1990

Personal information
- Full name: Avraham Cohen
- Date of birth: 14 November 1956
- Place of birth: Cairo, Egypt
- Date of death: 29 December 2010 (aged 54)
- Place of death: Tel Aviv, Israel
- Position: Defender

Youth career
- 1966–1974: Maccabi Tel Aviv

Senior career*
Years	Team	Apps	(Gls)
1974–1979	Maccabi Tel Aviv	134	(10)
1979–1981	Liverpool	18	(1)
1981–1987	Maccabi Tel Aviv	158	(4)
1987–1988	Rangers	7	(0)
1988–1990	Maccabi Tel Aviv	40	(1)
1991	Maccabi Netanya	3	(0)
Total		360	(16)

International career
1976–1988	Israel	51	(3)

Managerial career
- 1990–1992: Maccabi Netanya
- 1992–1993: Beitar Tel Aviv
- 1993–1994: Maccabi Yavne
- 1994–1995: Ironi Ashdod
- 1995–1998: Hapoel Kfar Saba
- 1998–1999: Hapoel Ashkelon
- 1999–2000: Hapoel Kfar Saba
- 2001: Maccabi Herzliya
- * Club domestic league appearances and goals

Avraham "Avi" Cohen (Hebrew: אבי כהן; 14 November 1956 – 29 December 2010) was an Israeli footballer who played as a defender, and a manager. He was best known for his spells playing for two British clubs: Liverpool in England and Rangers in Scotland. After retirement from active football and management, he was the chairman of the Israel Professional Footballers Association for over five years until he was killed in a motorcycle crash. after his death Maccabi Tel Aviv retired the number 5 that he formerly wore.

== Career ==
Cohen was born in Cairo, Egypt, and was Jewish. He moved to Israel as a youngster, and began his playing career with Maccabi Tel Aviv, before joining Liverpool for a fee of £200,000 ($450,000) in July 1979, and became the first Israeli to play in England. He struggled to establish himself as a regular at Anfield and was released in November 1981, rejoining Maccabi. On 20 September 1980, Cohen stirred up controversy when he decided to play in Liverpool's away fixture versus Southampton, which fell on the Jewish holiday of Yom Kippur. Liverpool drew with Southampton 2–2 in front of 24,085 spectators and Cohen was lambasted by the Israeli media for playing. He did not play enough matches to receive a winner's medal for either the first division League Championship or the European Cup. He returned to the United Kingdom in 1987, when he had a brief spell under former Liverpool teammate Graeme Souness at Rangers, before ending his career with Maccabi Netanya.

He also played for the Israel national team, making his debut on 19 July 1976 during the 1976 Summer Olympics in a 0–0 draw against Guatemala. On 9 October 1984, Cohen scored his first goal against Greece in a 2–2 friendly draw. He was capped 51 times, scoring 3 goals. His son, Tamir, is also a professional footballer who plays for Maccabi Haifa in the Israeli Premier League and the Israel national team.

== Personal life ==
Cohen was married to Dorit Cohen and the father of three, including the football player Tamir Cohen. In addition, Cohen was the brother-in-law of former football player Vicky Peretz and the uncle of Peretz sons – Adi and Omer Peretz.

In 2008, he participated in the Israeli reality version of Dancing with the Stars and was the fifth to be eliminated.

== Death ==
On 20 December 2010, Cohen was seriously injured in a motorcycle crash. He was taken to Tel Aviv's Ichilov Hospital, where he was immediately taken into surgery. On 28 December 2010, the hospital declared that Cohen was brain dead. His brain death was confirmed by his son Tamir later the same day. Paying tribute to Cohen, Kenny Dalglish said "Avi was a lovely man who will be remembered fondly by everyone at Liverpool who knew him. He quickly integrated himself into the football club when he joined us and spent a lot of time learning English which really made him popular. He was well liked by all the lads and although he didn't spend a long time at the club, he certainly left his mark and no-one will forget how he helped us win the league against Aston Villa. My thoughts and those of everyone connected to the club are with Avi's family." Ally McCoist said "we knew his situation was bad but never for a second did we think it would come to this" before going on to say it was "so sad to hear that he has passed away."

Liverpool marked the death of Cohen with a period of applause before their Premier League match against Wolverhampton Wanderers on 29 December 2010. The club also played a friendly game against the local Jewish community in honor of Avi. They competed for the Avi Cohen cup. Liverpool Legends team won 1–0.

On 24 April 2011, his son Tamir, of Bolton Wanderers, paid a tribute to his late father after scoring the winner against Arsenal and celebrating with a printed T-shirt with his father's face on it.

== Career statistics ==
#	Date	Venue	Opponent	Score	Result	Competition
1.	9 October 1984	Olympic Stadium, Athens, Greece	Greece	2–2	Draw	Friendly
2.	8 September 1985	Ramat Gan Stadium, Ramat Gan, Israel	Chinese Taipei	5–0	Win	1986 FIFA World Cup qual.
3.	20 October 1985	Olympic Park, Melbourne, Australia	Australia	1–1	Draw	1986 FIFA World Cup qual.
Correct as of 21 January 2017

== Honours ==
=== Player ===
Maccabi Tel Aviv

- Liga Leumit First Division: 1976–77, 1978–79
- State Cup: 1976–77, 1986–87
- Israel Super Cup: 1988

Liverpool

- Charity Shield: 1979, 1980
- Champions league 80/81
- Premier League 79/80
- carabao cup 1981

Rangers

- League Cup: 1987–88

=== Individual ===
- Israel Player of the Year: 1978–79
- Member of the Israeli Football Hall of Fame

== See also ==
- List of select Jewish football (association; soccer) players
