= Paul Wade =

Australian soccer player (born 1962)

Personal information
- Date of birth: 20 March 1962 (age 64)
- Place of birth: Cheshire, England
- Position: Midfielder

Senior career*
Years	Team	Apps	(Gls)
1984	Green Gully	28	(4)
1985–1986	Brunswick Juventus	49	(11)
1987–1995	South Melbourne	212	(27)
1995	Heidelberg United	6	(0)
1995–1997	Canberra Cosmos	45	(11)
Total		340	(53)

International career
1985	Australia B	2	(1)
1986–1996	Australia	84	(10)
- * Club domestic league appearances and goals

Paul Wade (born 20 March 1962) is an Australian retired soccer player, who is best known for his long-term role as captain of the national team.

== Club career ==
Born in Cheshire, England, Wade moved to Australia with his parents at age 11. By 1984, he had attained Australian citizenship and represented his adopted country for the first time, playing for Australia's "B" side against Tasmania. That same year, he made his debut in the National Soccer League with the Green Gully Cavaliers.

Wade played just one season with Green Gully before joining Brunswick Juventus the following season and helping them win the 1985 NSL Championship.

=== South Melbourne FC ===
He played two seasons with Brunswick before joining South Melbourne FC. Wade would become a key player in the Hellas midfield and become a fan favourite known for his intense work rate and tackling. He would spend eight seasons at the club, winning another NSL title in 1991 under the guidance of Ferenc Puskás. He would also win the NSL Cup in 1990 and a minor premiership (first overall at the end of the regular season) in 1993. Wade's performances for Hellas also led to him being named the NSL Player of the Year in 1988.

=== Later career ===
He joined the Canberra Cosmos in 1995 for what would be his final two seasons, but was unable to help the team from the bottom of the standings in either campaign. He announced his retirement from competitive football in 1997 at the end of the NSL season.

Wade's club career was spent entirely in Australia, a rarity for players from that country who often go to Europe on the lure of a better quality of football, more passionate fan support and higher salaries. Wade played a total of 345 games in the NSL.

== International career ==
Wade would become known as Mr Socceroo for his longevity and performances for the national side. In total, Wade played 118 games for Australia, including 84 for the "A" side, between 1986 and 1996. He represented the Socceroos at the 1988 Summer Olympics in Seoul, South Korea and in two FIFA World Cup qualifying campaigns (1990 and 1994).

One of his most famous moments came in 1993, during qualifying for the 1994 World Cup when Australia faced Argentina. Faced with the dubious honour of marking star Diego Maradona, Wade was valiant in helping Australia stay in the two games, although they would eventually lose 2–1 on aggregate goals following a 1–0 defeat in Buenos Aires.

His final international game was on 1 November 1996 in Canberra against Tahiti in the 1996 OFC Nations Cup final, which Australia won.

== International goals ==
No.	Date	Venue	Opponent	Score	Result	Competition
1.	27 March 1988	Auckland, New Zealand	Taiwan	3–0	3–0	1988 OFC Men's Olympic Qualifying Tournament
2.	14 July 1988	Sydney Football Stadium, Sydney, Australia	Argentina	1–0	4–1	Friendly
3.	25 October 1990	Gelora Bung Karno Stadium, Jakarta, Indonesia	Indonesia	1–0	3–0	1990 Indonesian Independence Cup
4.	25 October 1990	Gelora Bung Karno Stadium, Jakarta, Indonesia	Indonesia	3–0	3–0	1990 Indonesian Independence Cup
5.	2 February 1992	Olympic Park Stadium, Melbourne, Australia	Sweden	1–0	1–0	Friendly
6.	14 August 1992	Gelora Bung Karno Stadium, Jakarta, Indonesia	Indonesia	3–0	3–0	Friendly
7.	11 September 1992	Papeete, French Polynesia	Tahiti	3–0	3–0	1994 FIFA World Cup qualification
8.	26 September 1992	Newcastle, Australia	Solomon Islands	3–1	6–1	1994 FIFA World Cup qualification
9.	19 April 1993	National Stadium, Kallang, Singapore	Kuwait	1–0	1–3	Friendly
10.	15 November 1995	Breakers Stadium, Newcastle, Australia	New Zealand	2–0	3–0	1995 Trans-Tasman Cup

== After retirement ==
In 1995 Wade released his autobiography, Captain Socceroo: The Paul Wade story.

In July 2026, Wade revealed he has been diagnosed with probable chronic traumatic encephalopathy (CTE). Although the neurodegenerative disease linked to repeated head trauma can only be confirmed after death, Wade says it was suspected as early as 2024. Wade said he shared his experience to help raise awareness about concussion and brain health and hopes soccer rules are changed to stop young children from heading the ball.
