= Vic Smith =

New Zealand footballer

Personal information
- Full name: Victor R Smith
- Place of birth: New Zealand
- Position: Half-back

Senior career*
Years	Team	Apps	(Gls)
- Technical Old Boys

International career
1947–1948	New Zealand	6	(0)
- * Club domestic league appearances and goals

Victor R. "Vic" Smith is a former football (soccer) player who represented New Zealand at the international level.

Smith made his full All Whites debut in a 0–6 loss to South Africa on 5 July 1947 and ended his international playing career with six A-international caps to his credit, his final cap an appearance in a 0–4 loss to Australia on 4 September 1948.

Three of his brothers also represented New Zealand, Gordon Smith and Roger Smith playing official international appearances, while the third brother, Jack Smith, only played in unofficial matches. Ryan Nelsen, grandson of another brother, Bob Smith, also played for New Zealand
