= Andrew Zinni =

Australian soccer player

Personal information
- Full name: Andrew Zinni
- Date of birth: 6 March 1965 (age 61)
- Place of birth: Melbourne, Australia
- Position: Forward

Youth career
- Brunswick Juventus

Senior career*
Years	Team	Apps	(Gls)
1982–1988	Brunswick Juventus	138	(44)
1989–1993	Preston Macedonia	111	(20)
1993	Bulleen	5	(3)
1993–1994	Brunswick Pumas	22	(5)
1994–1995	Melbourne Zebras	19	(7)
1996	Thomastown Devils	16	(14)

International career^{‡}
1986–1991	Australia	10	(3)
- * Club domestic league appearances and goals as of 10:00, 26 August 2010 (UTC) ‡ National team caps and goals as of 09:36, 7 April 2020 (UTC)

Andrew Zinni (born 6 March 1965) is an Australian former international soccer player who most notably played for Brunswick Juventus and Preston Macedonia in the National Soccer League (NSL). Zinni played 17 times for the Australia national soccer team, including 10 times in full international matches.

Andrew's son, Stefan Zinni, is also a professional footballer.

== Honours ==
With Australia:

- Trans-Tasman Cup: 1986. 1987 (runners-up)
- President's Cup: 1987 (runners-up)
- Merlion Cup: 1990

With Brunswick Juventus:

- (Australia) NSL Championship: 1985

Personal honours:

- NSL Player of the Year: 1987 with Brunswick Juventus
