= Roger Smith (New Zealand footballer) =

New Zealand footballer

Personal information
- Full name: Roger N Smith
- Place of birth: New Zealand

Senior career*
Years	Team	Apps	(Gls)
- Western

International career
1948	New Zealand	1	(0)
- * Club domestic league appearances and goals

Roger Smith is a former football (soccer) player who represented New Zealand at international level.

Smith made a solitary official international appearance for the All Whites in a 0–6 loss to Australia on 14 August 1948.

Three of his brothers also represented New Zealand, Gordon Smith and Vic Smith making official international appearances, while the third brother, Jack Smith, only played in unofficial matches. Ryan Nelsen, grandson of another brother, Bob Smith, also played for New Zealand.
