= Trans-Tasman Cup =

Association football competition between Australia and New Zealand

The Trans-Tasman Cup was an association football tournament played between Australia and New Zealand. Six editions were played between 1983 and 1995 after the OFC Nations Cup was discontinued. It was considered the most important Oceanian tournament during the absence of the OFC Nations Cup. The tournament was won four times by Australia and twice by New Zealand. The 1995 edition doubled as a semifinal for the 1996 OFC Nations Cup.

== Format ==
The Cup was played over two legs, one in Australia and one in New Zealand.

== Past tournaments/winners ==
=== 1983 ===
Team 1	Agg.	Team 2	1st leg	2nd leg
New Zealand	4–1	Australia	2–1	2–0

22 February 1983

New Zealand	2–1	Australia
Cresswell 47'; Ratcliffe 69' (o.g.)	Report	Kosmina 36'

Mount Smart Stadium, Auckland
Attendance: 3,000
Referee: William Munro (New Zealand)

27 February 1983

Australia	0-2	New Zealand
	Report	Cole 66'; Adam 73'

Olympic Park Stadium, Melbourne
Attendance: 14,000
Referee: Jack Johnston (Australia)

=== 1986 ===
Team 1	Agg.	Team 2	1st leg	2nd leg
New Zealand	2–3	Australia	1–1	1–2

25 October 1986

New Zealand	1–1	Australia
Deeley 60'	Report	Arnold 55'

Mount Smart Stadium, Auckland
Attendance: 3,156
Referee: Garry Fleet (New Zealand)

2 November 1986

Australia	2–1	New Zealand
Arnold 29'; Zinni 74'	Report	Deeley 85'

Parramatta Stadium, Sydney
Attendance: 4,800
Referee: Gary Power (Australia)

=== 1987 ===
Team 1	Agg.	Team 2	1st leg	2nd leg
Australia	1–2	New Zealand	1–1	0–1

2 September 1987

Australia	1–1	New Zealand
Zinni 68'	Report	Ironside 82'

Olympic Park Stadium, Melbourne
Attendance: 5,000
Referee: Chris Bambridge (Australia)

9 September 1987

New Zealand	1–0	Australia
de Jong 18'	Report

Hutt Recreation Ground, Lower Hutt
Attendance: 5,000
Referee: Garry Fleet (New Zealand)

=== 1988 ===
Team 1	Agg.	Team 2	1st leg	2nd leg
New Zealand	1–4	Australia	1–2	0–2

12 October 1988

New Zealand	1–2	Australia
Ironside 77'	Report	Crino 60'; Ollerenshaw 74'

Caledonian Ground, Dunedin
Attendance: 3,000
Referee: Lennox Sharp (New Zealand)

16 October 1988

Australia	2–0	New Zealand
Lund 49' (o.g.); Spink 68'	Report

Queen Elizabeth Oval, Bendigo
Attendance: 5,000
Referee: Chris Bambridge (Australia)

=== 1991 ===
Team 1	Agg.	Team 2	1st leg	2nd leg
New Zealand	1–3	Australia	0–1	1–2

12 May 1991

New Zealand	0–1	Australia
	Report	Milosevic 44'

Queen Elizabeth II Park, Christchurch
Attendance: 8,000
Referee: Gary Fleet (New Zealand)

15 May 1991

Australia	2–1	New Zealand
Petersen 46'; A Vidmar 50'	Report	Roberts 75'

Hindmarsh Stadium, Adelaide
Attendance: 6,500
Referee: Bill Monteverde (Australia)

=== 1995 ===
Team 1	Agg.	Team 2	1st leg	2nd leg
New Zealand	0–3	Australia	0–0	0–3

10 November 1995

New Zealand	0–0	Australia
	Report

Queen Elizabeth II Park, Christchurch
Attendance: 8,000
Referee: Barry Tasker (New Zealand)

15 November 1995

Australia	3–0	New Zealand
Mori 33'; Wade 45' (pen.); Spiteri 51'	Report

Breakers Stadium, Newcastle
Attendance: 8,858
Referee: Simon Micallef (Australia)

== Summary ==
- 1983: Australia 1-4 New Zealand
- 1986: Australia 3-2 New Zealand
- 1987: Australia 1-2 New Zealand
- 1988: Australia 4-1 New Zealand
- 1991: Australia 3-1 New Zealand
- 1995: Australia 3-0 New Zealand

== Performances ==
Soccer Ashes winners by teams
Team	Winners	Runners-up
Australia	4	2
New Zealand	2	4

== See also ==
- Australia–New Zealand association football rivalry
- Soccer Ashes
