= Willem de Graaf =

New Zealand footballer

Billy de Graaf
Personal information
- Full name: Willem de Graaf
- Place of birth: Drachten, Netherlands
- Position: Midfielder

Senior career*
Years	Team	Apps	(Gls)
- Eastern Suburbs
- Mount Wellington
1973	Shelbourne	1	(0)
1981	Wollongong City	25	(1)
1982	Ringwood City		

International career
1969–1981	New Zealand	22	(7)
- * Club domestic league appearances and goals

Willem de Graaf (born c. 1951) is a former association football player who played as a midfielder. He represented the New Zealand national team at international level.

De Graaf made his full All Whites debut in a 0–0 draw with New Caledonia on 25 July 1969, and he ended his international playing career with 22 A-international caps and seven goals to his credit, his final cap gained in a 0–0 draw with Indonesia on 7 September 1981.
