= Allan Boath =

New Zealand footballer

Personal information
- Full name: Allan Roderick Boath
- Date of birth: 14 February 1958 (age 68)
- Place of birth: Dundee, Scotland
- Height: 1.71 m (5 ft 7 in)
- Position: Midfielder

Youth career
- Celtic Boys Club

Senior career*
Years	Team	Apps	(Gls)
1976–1977	Dundee United	0	(0)
1977–1978	Forfar Athletic	15	(0)
1978–1979	Woolston WMC	36	(10)
1980	Christchurch United	21	(2)
1981	Woolston WMC	16	(2)
1982	West Adelaide Hellas	11	(2)
1983–1984	Christchurch United	22	(4)
1984	Auckland University	13	(3)
1985–1988	North Shore United	89	(16)
Total		223	(39)

International career
1980–1988	New Zealand	38	(6)
- * Club domestic league appearances and goals

Allan Roderick Boath (born 14 February 1958 in Dundee, Scotland) is a former association football player, who represented New Zealand at international level.

== Career ==
Having been developed as a player through the Celtic Boys Club, Boath signed for Dundee United but never played for the first team. He then played for Forfar Athletic for one season, making 15 appearances in the Scottish Football League.

Boath emigrated to New Zealand in 1978. He qualified to play for New Zealand through residency laws and made 38 A-International appearances for New Zealand, scoring six times.

He represented the All Whites for all three matches at the 1982 FIFA World Cup in Spain, where they lost to Scotland, USSR and Brazil.

== Honours ==
New Zealand

- Trans-Tasman Cup: 1983, 1987
