= Steve Wooddin =

New Zealand footballer

Personal information
- Full name: Stephen Wooddin
- Date of birth: 6 January 1955 (age 71)
- Place of birth: Birkenhead, England
- Position: Striker

Senior career*
Years	Team	Apps	(Gls)
1972–1975	Cammell Laird		
1975	Tranmere Rovers	3	(0)
1975–1976	New Brighton		
1976–1977	Winsford United		
1977–1980	Dunedin City	62	(32)
1981–1983	South Melbourne	40	(6)
1984–1985	Christchurch United	18	(1)
1987–1989	Christchurch Technical		

International career
1980–1984	New Zealand	24	(11)
- * Club domestic league appearances and goals

Stephen Wooddin (born 16 January 1955) is a New Zealand former association football player who was a striker during the country's successful campaign to qualify for the 1982 FIFA World Cup in Spain.

== Club career ==
Born in Birkenhead, England, Wooddin started his club career at Tranmere Rovers in Birkenhead, where he made first team appearances before moving to New Zealand in 1977, joining Dunedin City. In 1981, he moved to Australia, playing three years for South Melbourne FC in the NSL, before returning to his adopted country with Christchurch United until his career was cut short by a recurring ankle injury in 1984. A Belgian First Division team had wanted to sign Wooddin after his capable performances at the 1982 FIFA World Cup in Spain, but already hampered by injury, he failed the medical.

== International career ==
Wooddin was first selected for the New Zealand national football team the All Whites for a 16 May 1980, 1–1 draw against a Southern Region team in Christchurch. He retained his place in the team which lost 2–1 to a Central Region selection two days later in Wellington.

Despite the unconvincing results, Wooddin was selected for the next match, in August, against Mexico in Auckland. He scored the fourth goal in a 4–0 win that remains one of the most outstanding and unexpected results in New Zealand's international football history.

The following year saw New Zealand begin the long road to the 1982 FIFA World Cup. Wooddin was selected for all fifteen games in the ultimately successful campaign, scoring eight goals in the process, including trademark left foot shots into the bottom corner both home and away against Australia, against Kuwait in the controversial 1–2 home loss, and in Riyadh against Saudi Arabia when the team recorded a stunning 5–0 victory. This last result led to a play-off against China in Singapore in January 1982, in which Wooddin again scored with a left-foot shot to open the scoring in his side's 2–1 win.

Wooddin was one of New Zealand's only two scorers in the 1982 World Cup (along with Steve Sumner), scoring the second New Zealand goal in a 5–2 loss to Scotland. He also started the subsequent matches against the Soviet Union and Brazil.

In 1983 injuries reduced Wooddin to just two international appearances, against Australia and Fiji. He made his last two appearances for the All Whites against Fiji in October 1984, scoring the winner in the first of these matches, before being forced to retire due to injured ankle ligaments with 24 A-internationals and 11 goals to his credit.
