= Tony Laus =

New Zealand footballer

Personal information
- Full name: Tony Laus
- Place of birth: New Zealand

Senior career*
Years	Team	Apps	(Gls)
1990	Waitakere City	26	(26)
1992–1993	Wollongong City	10	(2)

International career
1992	New Zealand	3	(3)
- * Club domestic league appearances and goals

Tony Laus is a former association football player who represented New Zealand at international level.

Laus played three official full internationals for New Zealand, making his debut in a 4–1 win over Vanuatu on 27 June and scoring a hat-trick in his second match winning 8–0 against the same opposition on 1 July 1992. His final appearance in an official international was a 0–0 draw with Pacific neighbours Fiji on 9 September 1992.

== Career statistics ==
=== International ===
Appearances and goals by national team and year
National team	Year	Apps	Goals
New Zealand	1992	3	3
Total		3	3

Scores and results list New Zealand's goal tally first, score column indicates score after each Laus goal.

List of international goals scored by Tony Laus
No.	Date	Venue	Opponent	Score	Result	Competition	Ref.
1	1 July 1992	Auckland, New Zealand	Vanuatu	1–0	8–0	1994 FIFA World Cup qualification	
2	1 July 1992	Auckland, New Zealand	Vanuatu	2–0	8–0	1994 FIFA World Cup qualification	
3	1 July 1992	Auckland, New Zealand	Vanuatu	6–0	8–0	1994 FIFA World Cup qualification	
