= Paul Halford =

New Zealand footballer

Personal information
- Full name: Paul G. Halford
- Place of birth: England
- Position: Midfielder

Senior career*
Years	Team	Apps	(Gls)
1981–1982	Derby County	0	(0)
1982–1987	Napier City Rovers	119	(21)
1988	Brisbane Lions	6	(0)
1989–1990	Southport Warriors		
1991–2001	Napier City Rovers		

International career
1987–1988	New Zealand	7	(3)
- * Club domestic league appearances and goals

Paul Halford is a former association football player who represented New Zealand at international level.

He was a star player for Napier City Rovers, scoring a goal in their 1985 Chatham Cup final success, in the 1980s before joining the Brisbane Lions. He returned to Napier City Rovers in 1991 helping the club to more success.

Halford made his All Whites debut on 9 June at Auckland, Mt Smart Stadium in an unofficial friendly against Glasgow Rangers. He scored in his first A-international, a 7-0 win over Western Samoa on 7 November 1987 and went on to represent the New Zealand national football team making 7 A-international appearances between 1987 and 1988, scoring three goals in all.

In 1993, Halford was awarded New Zealand soccer player of the year and players' player of the year, and he again was awarded the latter in 1996.

== Honours ==
=== Napier City Rovers ===
- New Zealand National Soccer League: 1993, 1998, 2000
- Chatham Cup: 1985, 1993, 2000

=== Southport Warriors ===
- Gold Coast League Premiership: 1989, 1990
- Gold Coast League Championship: 1989, 1990

=== Individual ===
- Jack Batty Memorial Cup: 1993
- Gold Coast League Golden Boot: 1989
