= Kevin Hagan =

New Zealand footballer (born 1957)

Personal information
- Full name: Kevin J Hagan
- Date of birth: 11 August 1957 (age 69)
- Place of birth: New Zealand
- Position: Centre forward

Senior career*
Years	Team	Apps	(Gls)
1983	Napier City Rovers	19	(9)
1984	Manurewa		
1985–1987	North Shore United		
1987–1988	St George Saints	40	(11)
1989	APIA Leichhardt	18	(5)
1989–1991	Sydney Olympic	25	(7)
1991–1992	Wollongong City	5	(0)

International career
1985–1987	New Zealand	11	(5)
- * Club domestic league appearances and goals

Kevin Hagan (born 11 August 1957) is an association football player who represented New Zealand at international level.

== Career ==
His senior career began with Napier City Rovers and was followed by stints at Auckland clubs Manurewa and North Shore United in the New Zealand National League, before he moved to Australia to join St George Saints in the National Soccer League. He later played for APIA Leichhardt, Sydney Olympic and Wollongong Wolves.

Hagan scored on his full All Whites debut, a 5–0 win over Fiji on 3 June 1985 and ended his international playing career with 11 A-international caps and 5 goals to his credit, scoring 4 in his final appearance, in a 12–0 win over Samoa on 13 November 1987.

== Career statistics ==
=== International ===
Appearances and goals by national team and year
National team	Year	Apps	Goals
New Zealand	1985	6	1
New Zealand	1986	2	0
New Zealand	1987	3	4
Total		11	5

Scores and results list New Zealand's goal tally first, score column indicates score after each Hagan goal.

List of international goals scored by Kevin Hagan
No.	Date	Venue	Opponent	Score	Result	Competition
1	3 June 1985	Links Avenue Reserve, Mount Maunganui, New Zealand	Fiji	2–0	5–0	Friendly
2	13 November 1987	Western Springs Stadium, Auckland, New Zealand	Western Samoa	3–0	12–0	1988 Summer Olympics qualification
3	13 November 1987	Western Springs Stadium, Auckland, New Zealand	Western Samoa	5–0	12–0	1988 Summer Olympics qualification
4	13 November 1987	Western Springs Stadium, Auckland, New Zealand	Western Samoa	7–0	12–0	1988 Summer Olympics qualification
5	13 November 1987	Western Springs Stadium, Auckland, New Zealand	Western Samoa	11–0	12–0	1988 Summer Olympics qualification

== Honours ==
Individual

- New Zealand Footballer of the Year: 1985
