= Robert Ironside (footballer) =

New Zealand footballer

Personal information
- Full name: Robert W Ironside
- Date of birth: 20 August 1967 (age 59)
- Place of birth: New Zealand
- Position: Midfielder

Senior career*
Years	Team	Apps	(Gls)
1985–1987	North Shore United	68	(12)
1987–1995	Sydney Olympic	152	(38)
1995–1996	South China FC	38	
1997	Sydney Olympic		
1998–2000	Newcastle Breakers	58	(14)

International career
1987–1993	New Zealand	32	(6)
- * Club domestic league appearances and goals

Robert Ironside (born 20 August 1967) is a former association football player who represented New Zealand internationally in the late 1980s and early 1990s.

== Club career ==
His club career began with North Shore United before he moved to Australia to join Sydney Olympic in the Australian National Soccer League. After seven seasons with Sydney, Ironside moved for two seasons to Newcastle Breakers He had a year playing for South China in Hong Kong and came back to Australia played one season with Sydney Olympic before finishing off in Newcastle.

== International career ==
Ironside made his All White debut in a 1–1 draw with Australia on 2 September 1987 and went on to make a total of 32 official A-international appearances in which he scored 6 goals, his final cap earned in a 0–3 loss to Australia on 6 June 1993. Altogether, including unofficial matches, Ironside played 72 matches for the All Whites.

== Career statistics ==
=== International ===
Appearances and goals by national team and year
National team	Year	Apps	Goals
New Zealand	1987	3	4
New Zealand	1988	12	1
New Zealand	1989	2	0
New Zealand	1990	2	0
New Zealand	1991	4	0
New Zealand	1992	4	1
New Zealand	1993	5	0
Total		32	6

Scores and results list New Zealand's goal tally first, score column indicates score after each Ironside goal.

List of international goals scored by Robert Ironside
No.	Date	Venue	Opponent	Score	Result	Competition
1	7 September 1987	Olympic Park Stadium, Melbourne, Australia	Australia	1–1	1–1	1987 Trans-Tasman Cup
2	7 November 1987	Apia Park, Apia, Western Samoa	Western Samoa	4–0	7–0	1988 Summer Olympics qualification
3	7 November 1987	Apia Park, Apia, Western Samoa	Western Samoa	5–0	7–0	1988 Summer Olympics qualification
4	7 November 1987	Apia Park, Apia, Western Samoa	Western Samoa	7–0	7–0	1988 Summer Olympics qualification
5	12 October 1988	Caledonian Ground, Dunedin, New Zealand	Australia	1–2	1–2	1988 Trans-Tasman Cup
6	1 July 1992	Mt. Smart Stadium, Auckland, New Zealand	Vanuatu	4–0	8–0	1994 FIFA World Cup qualification
