= Gordon Smith (New Zealand footballer) =

New Zealand footballer

Personal information
- Full name: Gordon Smith
- Place of birth: New Zealand
- Position: Striker

Senior career*
Years	Team	Apps	(Gls)
1936-1949	Western	148	(265)

International career
1947–1948	New Zealand	6	(7)
- * Club domestic league appearances and goals

Gordon Smith is a former football (soccer) player who represented New Zealand at international level.

Smith scored a hattrick on his full All Whites debut in a 5–6 loss to South Africa on 28 August 1947. and ended his international playing career with six A-international caps and 7 goals to his credit, his final cap an appearance in a 0–7 loss to Australia on 28 August 1948.

Three of his brothers also represented New Zealand, Vic Smith and Roger Smith playing official international appearances, while the third brother, Jack Smith, only played in unofficial matches. Ryan Nelsen, grandson of another brother, Bob Smith, also played for New Zealand.
