= Brian Roberts (New Zealand footballer) =

New Zealand footballer

Personal information
- Full name: Brian Roberts
- Place of birth: New Zealand

International career
Years	Team	Apps	(Gls)
1991	New Zealand	2	(1)

Brian Roberts is a former football (soccer) player who represented New Zealand at international level.

Roberts played two official A-international matches for the New Zealand in 1991, both against trans-Tasman rivals Australia, the first as a substitute in a 0–1 loss on 12 May. He started the match for his second and final appearance and scored New Zealand's goal in a 1–2 loss on 12 May 1991.
