= Steve Sumner =

New Zealand footballer (1955–2017)

Personal information
- Full name: Steven Paul Sumner
- Date of birth: 2 April 1955
- Place of birth: Preston, England
- Date of death: 8 February 2017 (aged 61)
- Place of death: New Zealand
- Position: Attacking midfielder

Youth career
- Blackpool
- Preston North End

Senior career*
Years	Team	Apps	(Gls)
1973–1980	Christchurch United	147	(36)
1981	Newcastle KB United	18	(3)
1982	West Adelaide SC	12	(2)
1983–1986	Manurewa AFC	66	(29)
1987	Gisborne City	25	(6)
1988–1989	Christchurch United		
Total		268	(76)

International career
1976–1988	New Zealand	58	(22)
- * Club domestic league appearances and goals

Steven Paul Sumner ONZM (2 April 1955 – 8 February 2017) was an English-born, New Zealand footballer who played as a midfielder. He was captain of the national team during the country's first successful campaign to qualify for the World Cup, in 1982. He is also the first New Zealander to score in the World Cup, doing so in the 54th minute in New Zealand's 1982 opening game against Scotland.

== Club career ==
Born in Preston, England, Sumner began his football as an apprentice at Blackpool before moving to New Zealand in 1973 to play for Christchurch United, winning the National League in his first year. Sumner went on to win 6 Chatham Cups and 5 league titles. He is the only player to have won six Chatham Cup winners medals.

== International career ==
His international career spanned from 1976 to 1988, including a record 105 appearances for New Zealand (beating the record previously held by Brian Turner), 58 of which were A-internationals.

Sumner scored a national record six goals during New Zealand's 13–0 defeat of Fiji during the 1982 World Cup qualifying campaign. He was also one of New Zealand's only two scorers in the 1982 World Cup Finals tournament in Spain (along with Steve Wooddin), in New Zealand's 5–2 loss to Scotland. He was the first player of the FIFA Oceania zone to score in a World Cup.

In 1991, he was inducted into the New Zealand Soccer Media Association Hall of Fame and was then awarded FIFA's top award, the FIFA Order of Merit, before the opening of the 2010 FIFA World Cup, along with Johan Cruyff and former South African president Thabo Mbeki.

== Career statistics ==
=== International ===
List of international goals scored by Steve Sumner
No.	Date	Venue	Opponent	Score	Result	Competition
1.	23 March 1977	Auckland, New Zealand	Taiwan	2–0	6–0	1978 FIFA World Cup qualification
2.	23 March 1977	Auckland, New Zealand	Taiwan	3–0	6–0	1978 FIFA World Cup qualification
3.	23 March 1977	Auckland, New Zealand	Taiwan	4–0	6–0	1978 FIFA World Cup qualification
4.	26 July 1979	Nouméa, New Caledonia	New Caledonia	?–0	2–0	Friendly
5.	25 February 1980	Nouméa, New Caledonia	Tahiti	1–0	1–3	1980 Oceania Cup
6.	25 April 1981	Auckland, New Zealand	Australia	3–3	3–3	1982 FIFA World Cup qualification
7.	3 May 1981	Ba, Fiji	Fiji	2–0	4–0	1982 FIFA World Cup qualification
8.	16 August 1981	Auckland, New Zealand	Fiji	2–0	13–0	1982 FIFA World Cup qualification
9.	16 August 1981	Auckland, New Zealand	Fiji	7–0	13–0	1982 FIFA World Cup qualification
10.	16 August 1981	Auckland, New Zealand	Fiji	9–0	13–0	1982 FIFA World Cup qualification
11.	16 August 1981	Auckland, New Zealand	Fiji	10–0	13–0	1982 FIFA World Cup qualification
12.	16 August 1981	Auckland, New Zealand	Fiji	11–0	13–0	1982 FIFA World Cup qualification
13.	16 August 1981	Auckland, New Zealand	Fiji	13–0	13–0	1982 FIFA World Cup qualification
14.	14 December 1981	Kuwait City, Kuwait	Kuwait	1–1	2–2	1982 FIFA World Cup qualification
15.	15 June 1982	Málaga, Spain	Scotland	1–3	2–5	1982 FIFA World Cup
16.	25 September 1983	Auckland, New Zealand	Japan	1–1	3–1	1984 Summer Olympics Qualifiers
17.	25 September 1983	Auckland, New Zealand	Japan	3–1	3–1	1984 Summer Olympics Qualifiers
18.	7 October 1983	Tokyo, Japan	Japan	1–0	1–0	1984 Summer Olympics Qualifiers
19.	5 June 1985	Gisborne, New Zealand	Fiji	?–0	3–0	Friendly
20.	7 June 1985	Auckland, New Zealand	Fiji	?–0	2–0	Friendly
21.	5 October 1985	Auckland, New Zealand	Chinese Taipei	3–0	5–1	1986 FIFA World Cup qualification
22.	5 October 1985	Auckland, New Zealand	Chinese Taipei	4–1	5–1	1986 FIFA World Cup qualification
23.	5 October 1985	Auckland, New Zealand	Chinese Taipei	5–1	5–1	1986 FIFA World Cup qualification

== Later life and death ==
After retiring Sumner maintained his involvement in football, being employed by TVNZ as a media personality. He also sat on the executive board of the Wellington Phoenix bringing much needed professional playing experience to the table. In August 2015, he was diagnosed with prostate cancer, from which he died on 8 February 2017, aged 61.

=== Steve Sumner Trophy ===
In 2018 New Zealand Football named the Man of the Match trophy for the New Zealand Football Championship final after Sumner, calling it the "Steve Sumner Trophy". It was first awarded to Callum McCowatt after he scored the only goal in Auckland City 1–0 win over Team Wellington in the final. McCowatt won it a second time the following year, this time while playing for Eastern Suburbs, where he scored a hattrick in the finals, again against Team Wellington.

== Honours ==
=== Individual ===
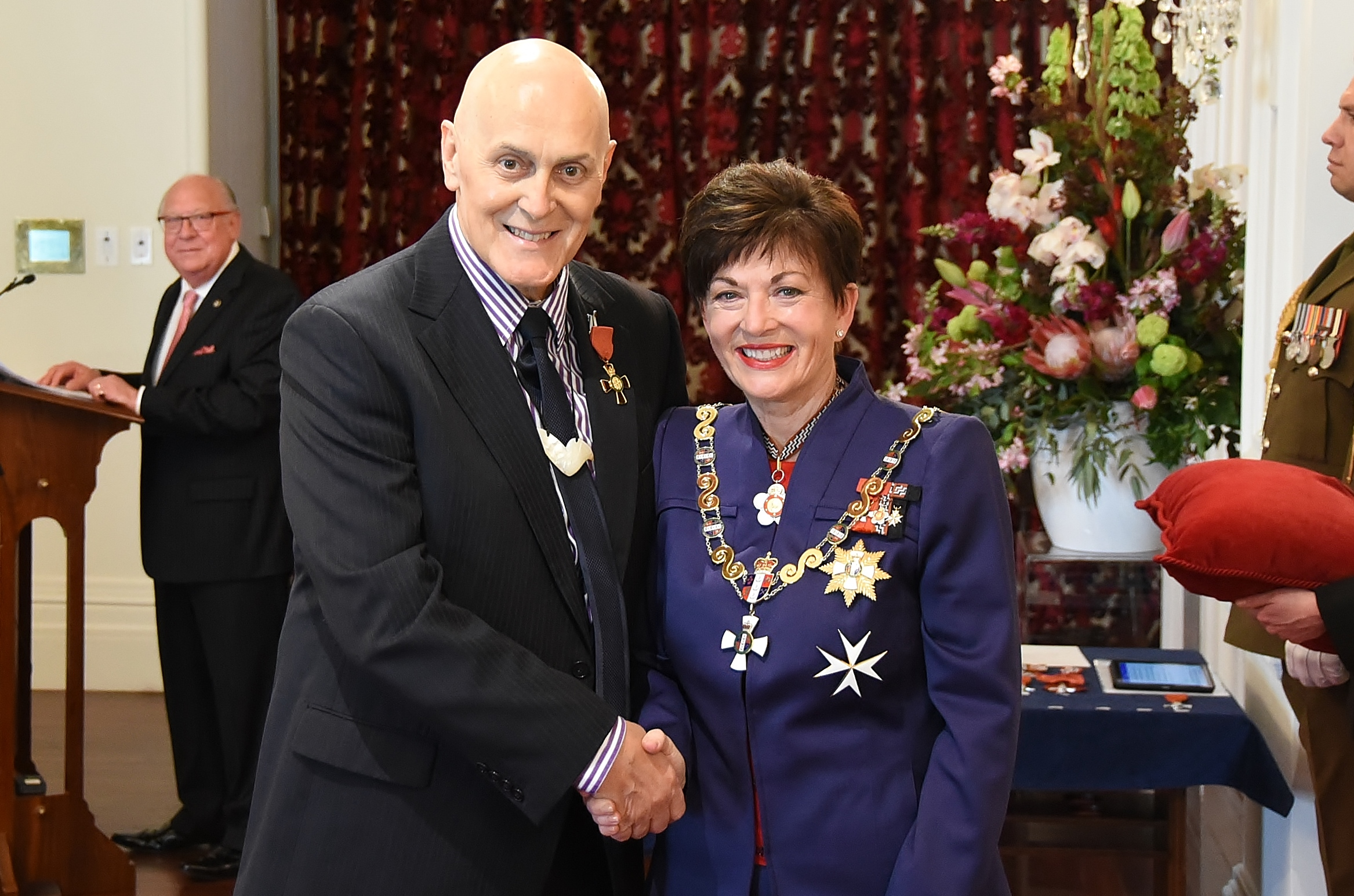
Sumner in 2016, after his investiture as an Officer of the New Zealand Order of Merit by the governor-general, Patsy Reddy.

- New Zealand Footballer of the Year: 1983
- Golden Boot: 1983
- FIFA Centennial Award in 2004
- FIFA Order of Merit: 2010
- Friends of Football Medal of Excellence 2015
- Officer of the New Zealand Order of Merit (for services to football), 2016 Queen's Birthday Honours
- IFFHS Oceania Men's Team of All Time: 2021

=== Club ===
Christchurch United

- National League: 1973, 1975, 1978, 1988
- Chatham Cup: 1974, 1975, 1976, 1989

Manurewa

- National League: 1983
- Chatham Cup: 1984

Gisborne City

- Chatham Cup: 1987
