= Billy McClure =

New Zealand footballer

Personal information
- Date of birth: 4 January 1958 (age 68)
- Place of birth: Liverpool, England
- Position: Midfielder

Senior career*
Years	Team	Apps	(Gls)
1974–1977	Liverpool Reserves	8	(2)
1977–1978	Persepolis	3	(1)
1979–1983	Mount Wellington	80	(29)
1983–1988	Papatoetoe	100	(23)
1988–1997	Mount Wellington		

International career
1981–1986	New Zealand	30	(5)
- * Club domestic league appearances and goals

William James S. M. McClure (born 4 January 1958) is a former footballer who represented New Zealand.

== Club career ==
He played for Liverpool F.C. Reserves from 1974 to 1977.

In 1977, he became the first foreign player in Iranian Takht-e-Jamshid Professional Soccer League. He made 2 appearances for Tehran's giants Persepolis F.C. and scored one goal. However, he had difficulty making it to the starting lineups so he moved back to England. He moved to New Zealand in 1979 and played for Mount Wellington in New Zealand from 1979 to 1997 with some years in between for Papatoetoe FC.

== International career ==
McClure made his full All Whites debut in a 0–0 draw with India on 1 September 1981. Including friendlies he played 45 times for the All Whites, of which 30 appearances were official A-internationals in which he scored 5 goals, earning his final cap in a 2–1 win over Fiji on 19 September 1986.

He was a member of the All Whites at the 1982 FIFA World Cup in Spain .
