= Earle Thomas =

New Zealand footballer

Personal information
- Full name: William Earle Thomas

Senior career*
Years	Team	Apps	(Gls)
1965–1967	Hamilton		
1967–1976	Mount Wellington	90	(71)
1976	Eden	3	(2)
1977	Mount Wellington	15	(3)
1978–1979	Eastern Suburbs	40	(13)
1980	Blockhouse Bay	19	(1)

International career
1967–1976	New Zealand	23	(7)
- * Club domestic league appearances and goals

William Earle Thomas more commonly known as Earle Thomas is a soccer player who represented New Zealand at international level.

Thomas' clubs included Hamilton, University-Mount Wellington, Eastern Suburbs AFC, and Blockhouse Bay.

== International career ==
Thomas made his senior All Whites debut in a 3–5 against Australia on 5 November 1967, and scored 2 goals in his first start 3 days later in a 3–1 win over Singapore. He went on to finish his international playing career with 23 A-international caps to his credit, his final cap coming in a 1–2 loss against New Caledonia on 2 October 1976. Thomas scored 7 A-international goals and captained his country on numerous occasions.

== Administration career ==
In 2013, Thomas became a founding committee member of the independent group Friends of Football
