= Grant Turner (footballer) =

New Zealand footballer (1958–2023)

Personal information
- Full name: Grant John Turner
- Date of birth: 7 October 1958
- Place of birth: Lower Hutt, New Zealand
- Date of death: 28 February 2023 (aged 64)
- Place of death: Tauranga, New Zealand
- Height: 1.80 m (5 ft 11 in)
- Position: Midfielder

Senior career*
Years	Team	Apps	(Gls)
1973–1975	Petone	9	(4)
1975	Hungaria	13	(5)
1976	Stop Out	9	(2)
1977–1979	Petone	46	(35)
1980–1982	Gisborne City	59	(32)
1982	South Melbourne Hellas	3	(0)
1983–1984	Gisborne City	27	(11)
1985	Petone	19	(16)
1986–1987	Miramar Rangers	23	(10)
1988	Gisborne City	3	(0)
1988–1989	Wellington United	3	(0)
1990	Miramar Rangers	5	(0)
1990–1991	Petone	9	(0)
1992–1993	Stokes Valley	33	(19)
1999–2000	Petone	11	(0)
Total		269	(134)

International career
1980–1988	New Zealand	42	(15)
- * Club domestic league appearances and goals

Grant John Turner (7 October 1958 – 28 February 2023) was a New Zealand association football player who represented the New Zealand national team 42 times in A-internationals from 1980 to 1988, scoring 15 goals.

Turner was a member of the first successful All Whites campaign to qualify for the World Cup, in 1982 in Spain, where they played three group games against Scotland, USSR and Brazil, but he did not play in the finals due to an injury sustained soon after arrival in Spain.

== Club career ==
Turner started his senior career in 1973, playing for Petone in the local Capital Football leagues in Wellington, though he only making 2 appearances from the bench. He got his first start for the club the next season as well as getting his first senior goal in a 3–0 win over Christian Youth. He ended the season at Petone with five appearances and the two goals from that game.

In 1976, Turner made his national debut with Stop Out in the National Soccer League. Turner was the top goal scorer and voted Player of the Year in 1981 while playing with Gisborne City. He twice made the finals of the Chatham Cup, New Zealand premier knockout competition, also with the club. First losing to Mt Wellington in 1983, in which they drew the first game before losing 0–2 in the replay. That was followed by a loss in the 1984 final, this time to Manurewa.

Turner would win the national league with Gisborne City in 1984. Then in 1985, he won the NZFA Challenge Trophy, a pre-season trophy contested between the winners of the previous season's Chatham Cup and National League competitions. This time beating Manurewa 1–0. He won the Player of the Year a second time in 1986.

== International career ==
Turner made his international debut for New Zealand in a 4–0 win over Mexico, acknowledged as the start of New Zealand's 1982 World Cup campaign.

Turner scored in New Zealand's 2–0 win over Australia in one of their most important trans-tasman wins in All Whites history, that put New Zealand through to the second round of qualification.

Turner retired from international football in 1988 after getting concussed in a match against Israel at Eden Park. He continued to play club football until 2002.

== Personal life and death ==
Turner was born in Lower Hutt on 7 October 1958.

Turner revealed in 2021 he was facing a battle with cancer.

Turner was inducted into the Sports Legends of Wellington in 2022 for his contribution to football.

Turner died in Tauranga on 28 February 2023, at the age of 64.

== Honours ==
Individual

- New Zealand Footballer of the Year: 1981, 1986
