= Darren McClennan =

New Zealand footballer

Personal information
- Full name: Darren John McClennan
- Date of birth: 21 October 1965 (age 61)
- Place of birth: Auckland, New Zealand
- Position: Striker

Senior career*
Years	Team	Apps	(Gls)
1986	North Shore United		
1988	Lynndale		
1989–1990	Mt Wellington		
1993–1999	Waitakere City F.C.		
2001	Onehunga Sports		

International career^{‡}
1986–1997	New Zealand	43	(12)
- * Club domestic league appearances and goals as of 15 February 2007 ‡ National team caps and goals as of 15 February 2007

Darren McClennan (born 21 October 1965) is a former New Zealand associacion footballer who frequently represented his country in the 1980s and 1990s.

He was known for his high-energy, aggressive style which earned him numerous goals and trophies.

== International career ==
The striker collected 53 caps, scoring 12 goals, in official FIFA internationals and played his last game for the All Whites in June 1997 against Papua New Guinea.

== Career statistics ==
=== International ===
Appearances and goals by national team and year
National team	Year	Apps	Goals
New Zealand	1986	4	0
New Zealand	1988	9	1
New Zealand	1989	3	0
New Zealand	1992	3	4
New Zealand	1993	5	0
New Zealand	1995	9	3
New Zealand	1996	6	1
New Zealand	1997	4	0
Total		43	12

Scores and results list New Zealand's goal tally first, score column indicates score after each McClennan goal.

List of international goals scored by Darren McClennan
No.	Date	Venue	Opponent	Score	Result	Competition	Ref.
1	11 December 1988	Newtown Park, Wellington, New Zealand	Chinese Taipei	2–0	4–0	1990 FIFA World Cup qualification	
2	15 December 1988	Western Springs Stadium, Auckland, New Zealand	Chinese Taipei	2–0	4–1	1990 FIFA World Cup qualification	
3	15 December 1988	Western Springs Stadium, Auckland, New Zealand	Chinese Taipei	3–0	4–1	1990 FIFA World Cup qualification	
4	15 December 1988	Western Springs Stadium, Auckland, New Zealand	Chinese Taipei	4–0	4–1	1990 FIFA World Cup qualification	
5	27 June 1992	Port Vila, Vanuatu	Vanuatu	1–0	4–1	1994 FIFA World Cup qualification	
6	27 June 1992	Port Vila, Vanuatu	Vanuatu	2–0	4–1	1994 FIFA World Cup qualification	
7	1 July 1992	Auckland, New Zealand	Vanuatu	5–0	8–0	1994 FIFA World Cup qualification	
8	1 July 1992	Auckland, New Zealand	Vanuatu	8–0	8–0	1994 FIFA World Cup qualification	
9	21 February 1995	Tauranga, New Zealand	Singapore	3–0	3–0	Friendly	
10	9 June 1995	Papeete, Tahiti	Tahiti	1–0	1–2	Friendly	
11	28 June 1995	Estadio Atilio Paiva Olivera, Rivera, Uruguay	Uruguay	1–1	2–2	Friendly	
12	9 October 1996	Bourj Hammoud Stadium, Bourj Hammoud, Lebanon	Lebanon	1–1	1–1	Friendly	

== Achievements ==
- New Zealand Player of the Year: 1

1994

- Chatham Cup winner's medal:

1986
