= Noel Barkley =

New Zealand footballer (born 1961)

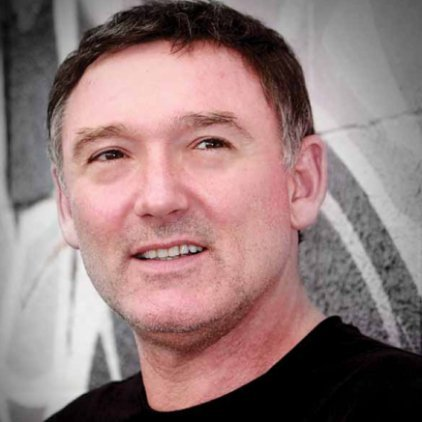

Personal information
- Full name: Noel W Barkley
- Date of birth: 25 March 1961 (age 65)
- Place of birth: Northern Ireland
- Position: Striker

Senior career*
| Years | Team | Apps | (Gls) |
| 1978–1981 | Larne | | |
| 1981–1983 | Crusaders | | |
| 1983–1986 | Mount Maunganui | | |
| 1987–1988 | Papatoetoe | | |
| 1988–1991 | Mount Wellington | | |
| 1991–1991 | Newcastle Breakers | 8 | (3) |
| 1991–1993 | Waitakere City | | |

International career
| 1986–1991 | New Zealand | 20 | (5) |
- * Club domestic league appearances and goals

Noel Barkley (born 1 March 1961) is a Northern Irish-born former association football player who represented New Zealand at international level.

== Career ==
Barkley began his career in his native Northern Ireland, playing in the Irish League for Larne and Crusaders, before emigrating to New Zealand in February 1983.

Barkley made his full All Whites debut in a 4–2 win over Fiji on 17 September 1986 and ended his international playing career with 20 A-international caps and 5 goals to his credit, his final cap gained in a 0–1 loss to Australia on 12 May 1991.

Barkley won New Zealand Player of the Year award 3 times, in 1989, 1990 and 1992.

Barkely scored 106 National League goals in 180 appearances. He also scored 249 goals in 417 senior appearances for Mt Maunganui, Papatoetoe, Mt Wellington, Newcastle Breakers, Waitakere City FC, Ellerslie and Central.

== Honours ==
- National League Golden Boot: 1989, 1992 and 1995
- National League Winner: 1992
- National League Grand Final Medalist: 1989 (Mt Wellington) 1993 (Waitakere City FC)
- Chatham Cup Winner: 1990 (Mt Wellington) & 1994 (Waitakere City FC)
- Chatham Cup Runners Up: 1986 (Mt Maunganui)
- Auckland Football Association Player of the Year: 1989
- Northern League Player of the Year: 1986
- Northern League Winner: 1986 (Mt Maunganui)
- Country Foods Cup Winner: 1985 (Mt Maunganui)

Stats supplied by football historian Barry Smith
