= Danny Halligan =

New Zealand footballer

Personal information
- Full name: Daniel R Halligan
- Date of birth: 17 February 1965 (age 61)
- Height: 1.77 m (5 ft 9 1/2 in)
- Position: Midfielder

Senior career*
Years	Team	Apps	(Gls)
ante 1987–1990	Christchurch United		
1991–1993	Brisbane United	42	(0)

International career
1987–1993	New Zealand	36	(5)

Managerial career
- 2006–2008: Canturbury United
- 2019–2021: Christchurch United
- * Club domestic league appearances and goals

Danny Halligan (born 17 February 1965) is a former association football player who represented New Zealand at an international level.

Halligan spent 2 years with Brisbane United in the Australian National Soccer League from 1991 to 1993

He made his full All Whites debut in a 1–1 draw against Australia on 2 September 1987 and ended his international playing career with 36 A-international caps and 5 goals to his credit, his final cap came in a 0–3 loss to Australia on 6 June 1993.

== Honours ==
Individual

- Mainland Football Mens Coach of the Year: 2017
