= Rodger Gray =

New Zealand footballer

Personal information
- Full name: Rodger G Gray
- Date of birth: 6 May 1966 (age 60)
- Place of birth: New Zealand
- Position: Centre back

Senior career*
Years	Team	Apps	(Gls)
1989	Mt Wellington		
1989–??	Waitakere City		

International career
1989–1997	New Zealand	39	(4)
- * Club domestic league appearances and goals

Rodger G Gray (born 6 May 1966) is a former association football player who frequently represented New Zealand in the 1990s.

Gray captained the All Whites and ended his international playing career with 39 A-international caps and 4 goals to his credit.

== Club history ==
- Mt Wellington (1989)
- Waitakere City F.C. (1989–??)
- Waitemata FC (1987)
