= Michael McGarry =

New Zealand footballer

Personal information
- Full name: Michael Daniel McGarry
- Date of birth: 17 May 1965 (age 61)
- Place of birth: Mosgiel, New Zealand
- Position: Midfielder

Team information
- Current team: Mosgiel

Senior career*
Years	Team	Apps	(Gls)
1986–1987	Dunedin City		
1988	Mosgiel		
1989	Sydney Olympic	17	(2)
1989–1990	Christchurch United		
1991–1995	Roslyn-Wakari		
1996–1997	Miramar Rangers		
1998–2000	Spirit FC		
2001–2011	Mosgiel		

International career
1986–1997	New Zealand	54	(12)
- * Club domestic league appearances and goals

Michael McGarry (born 17 May 1965) is a former New Zealand association footballer who frequently represented the New Zealand national football team in the 1980s and 1990s.

== Club career ==
His senior career began with Dunedin City and later Mosgiel, before he moved to Australia to join Sydney Olympic in the National Soccer League. He returned to New Zealand after a single season to join Christchurch United where he won back-to-back Jack Batty Memorial Trophies contesting the Chatham Cup final on the winning side in 1989 and the losing side in 1990.

== International career ==
McGarry scored in his full All Whites début in a 4–2 win over Fiji on 17 September 1986 and ended his international playing career having pulled on the all white shirt 87 times, including 54 A-international caps in which he scored 12 goals, earning his final cap in a 0–5 loss to Indonesia on 21 September 1997.

== Personal life ==
He is the father of New Zealand international James McGarry. Since retirement, McGarry has taught at Otago Boys' High School where he has overseen a successful period in the school's footballing history. In 2015 he took leave from the school to coordinate operations for the 2015 2015 FIFA U-20 World Cup.

== Career statistics ==
=== International ===
Appearances and goals by national team and year
National team	Year	Apps	Goals
New Zealand	1986	4	1
New Zealand	1987	4	4
New Zealand	1988	10	5
New Zealand	1990	2	0
New Zealand	1991	4	0
New Zealand	1992	4	2
New Zealand	1993	3	0
New Zealand	1995	9	0
New Zealand	1996	6	0
New Zealand	1997	8	0
Total		54	12

Scores and results list New Zealand's goal tally first, score column indicates score after each McGarry goal.

List of international goals scored by Michael McGarry
No.	Date	Venue	Opponent	Score	Result	Competition	Ref.
1	17 September 1986	Churchill Park, Lautoka, Fiji	Fiji	4–2	4–2	Friendly	
2	7 November 1987	Apia Park, Apia, Samoa	Western Samoa	2–0	7–0	1988 Summer Olympics qualification	
3	13 November 1987	Western Springs Stadium, Auckland, New Zealand	Western Samoa	1–0	12–0	1988 Summer Olympics qualification	
4	13 November 1987	Western Springs Stadium, Auckland, New Zealand	Western Samoa	2–0	12–0	1988 Summer Olympics qualification	
5	13 November 1987	Western Springs Stadium, Auckland, New Zealand	Western Samoa	6–0	12–0	1988 Summer Olympics qualification	
6	13 March 1988	Sydney Football Stadium, Sydney, Australia	Australia	1–1	1–3	1988 Summer Olympics qualification	
7	20 March 1988	Queen Elizabeth II Park, Christchurch, New Zealand	Chinese Taipei	1–0	2–0	1988 Summer Olympics qualification	
8	23 March 1988	Athletic Park, Wellington, New Zealand	Australia	1–0	1–1	1988 Summer Olympics qualification	
9	21 June 1988	Olympic Park Stadium, Melbourne, Australia	Saudi Arabia	2–0	2–0	Friendly	
10	23 June 1988	Olympic Park Stadium, Melbourne, Australia	Saudi Arabia	3–0	3–2	Friendly	
11	1 July 1992	Auckland, New Zealand	Vanuatu	3–0	8–0	1994 FIFA World Cup qualification	
12	1 July 1992	Auckland, New Zealand	Vanuatu	7–0	8–0	1994 FIFA World Cup qualification	
