= Andy Deeley =

New Zealand footballer

Personal information
- Full name: Andrew Deeley
- Place of birth: New Zealand
- Position: Forward

Senior career*
Years	Team	Apps	(Gls)
?–1986	Gisborne City		
1987–?	heidelberg Alexandra		

International career
1986–1987	New Zealand	4	(6)
- * Club domestic league appearances and goals

Andrew Deeley is a former association football player who represented New Zealand at international level. He is the son of former Wolverhampton Wanderers winger and England international, Norman Deeley.

Deeley scored on his full All Whites debut in a 1–1 draw with Australia on 25 October 1986. He played a total of four A-internationals scoring in each of them, including a hat-trick in his final appearance as New Zealand beat Western Samoa 12–0 on 13 November 1987.
