= New Zealand Football =

Sports governing body for association football in New Zealand

OFC
- Short name: NZF
- Founded: 1891
- Headquarters: Auckland
- FIFA affiliation: 1948
- OFC affiliation: 1966
- President: Johanna Wood
- Website: www.nzfootball.co.nz

New Zealand Football (Māori: Whutupaoro o Aotearoa) is the governing body for the sport of association football in New Zealand. It oversees the seven New Zealand Football federations, as well as the New Zealand men's national football team (nicknamed the "All Whites"), the national junior and women's teams (nicknamed the "Football Ferns"), the men's and women's national Leagues New Zealand National League, National Women's League, and a number of tournaments, including the Chatham Cup and Kate Sheppard Cup. Two New Zealand teams, Auckland FC and Wellington Phoenix FC, who play in the Australian's A-League Men and A-League Women, also come under New Zealand Football jurisdiction.

== History ==
It was founded in 1891, as the New Zealand Football Association and became officially affiliated with FIFA in 1948. For a period the organisation was known as New Zealand Soccer. In May 2007, it was renamed New Zealand Football (NZF), replacing the word "soccer" with "football" in line with the common usage as for sometime football had been referred to as soccer in New Zealand.

New Zealand was admitted as a member of the Asian Football Confederation in 1964, but it lost membership later. New Zealand with Australia eventually formed the Oceania Football Federation (now Oceania Football Confederation) in 1966.

In September 2007, the New Zealand female football teams were re-branded. The women's national team changed its name from "SWANZ" to "Football Ferns", the female under-20 team to the "Junior Football Ferns" and the under-17 team became the "Young Football Ferns"

In the 2010 World Cup in South Africa, New Zealand achieved their best result in their team's history when they had a 1–1 draw with reigning World champions Italy. Shane Smeltz scored in the 7th minute marking the first time New Zealand had ever led a match at the World Cup. They went on to become the only unbeaten team in the tournament.

=== Moving to South American confederation ===
In January 2013, members of the FIFA Executive Committee met in a private meeting convened by Joseph Blatter to discuss the possibilities of moving the New Zealand Football Federation to the South American Football Confederation (CONMEBOL) in order to enhance the sport in the country. After the meeting, Blatter said the idea was "ratified" but needed some adjustments. This fact provided the New Zealand success in the idea of movement, requiring only a formal request by the association. But in June, the chief executive of the New Zealand Federation, Andy Martin, said his administration has no plans to promote the New Zealand Football to high-level competitions for now, meaning that New Zealand should remain in the weak Oceania Football Confederation.

=== International stage ===
In recent time, New Zealand Football has enjoyed good success on the international stage. The All Whites overcame Papua New Guinea in the OFC Nations Cup Final by winning 4–2 on penalties in the final. It was their fifth title in the OFC Nations Cup and it secured their place in the 2017 FIFA Confederations Cup in Russia.

In 2015, the Football Ferns reached their highest ever ranking (16), beating Brazil for the second time and qualifying for the Rio Olympics. The Men's U-20 and U-17 sides qualified out of their groups at their respective FIFA World Cup tournaments in 2015. New Zealand were one of only five countries in the same cycle to achieve this. The remaining four were Germany, Brazil, Mali and Nigeria

New Zealand co-hosted the 2023 FIFA Women's World Cup alongside Australia, becoming the first ever senior FIFA event in New Zealand, the first Women's World Cup to be hosted in multiple countries, and only the second World Cup tournament to do so, following the 2002 Men's FIFA World Cup. It was also the first FIFA Women's World Cup to be held in the Southern Hemisphere, the first senior FIFA tournament to be held in the Oceania Confederation, and the first FIFA tournament to be hosted across multiple confederations (with Australia in the AFC and New Zealand in the OFC).

== Member federations ==
- Northern Region Football – following the merger of Auckland Football Federation and Northern Football Federation in 2020.
- WaiBOP Football
- Central Football
- Capital Football
- Mainland Football
- Southern Football

== Competitions ==
- New Zealand National League (national men's league)
- National Women's League (national women's league)
- New Zealand Football Chatham Cup (national men's winter league's knockout competition)
- Kate Sheppard Cup (national women's winter league's knockout competition)
- Charity Cup (national league v chatham cup)
- Northern League (regional winter league)
- Central League (regional winter league)
- Southern League (regional winter league)

=== Defunct competitions ===
- ISPS Handa Premiership (national men's league) (2004–2021)
- National Soccer League (national club competition) (1970–1992 and 2000–2003)
- Air NZ Pre-Season Cup (pre-season competition) (1974–1985)
- NZFA Challenge Trophy (NSL vs Chatham Cup play-off) (1978–1987)
- Superclub League (regional/national superclub competition) (1993–1995)
- National Summer League (first national summer competition) (1996–1998)
- New Zealand Island League (north and south island competition with a play-off) (1999)
- National Youth League (youth league) (2003–2019)
- White Ribbon Cup (competition played by national league teams not at OFC competition) (2011)
- Charity Cup (national league vs New Zealand OFC representative play-off) (2011–2018)
- Winfield Challenge Shield

=== Current title holders ===
Competition	Year	Champions	Runners-up	Next edition
Senior (Men's)
New Zealand National League	2025	Auckland City	Wellington Olympic	2026
Chatham Cup	2026	Fencibles United	Cashmere Technical	2027
Charity Cup	2024	Wellington Olympic	Christchurch United	2026
Senior (Women's)
National Women's League	2025	Auckland United	Eastern Suburbs	2026
Kate Sheppard Cup	2026	Eastern Suburbs	Cashmere Technical	2027

== Controversies ==
In November 2008, Glen Moss was handed a 4-match World Cup ban after swearing at referee Lencie Fred in a dead-rubber 2010 World Cup qualification match against Fiji. New Zealand Football failed to lodge an appeal to FIFA in time after they received notification of the sentence on 23 December and were closing for the Christmas period. Moss was subsequently suspended for the two 2010 FIFA World Cup inter-confederation play off matches against Bahrain and the first two 2010 FIFA World Cup matches against Slovakia and Italy.

In July 2015, New Zealand was ruled to have forfeited its place in the 2016 Olympic tournament after fielding an ineligible player in its men's Under-23 team; NZF decided not to appeal the decision. It was subsequently reported that up to 16 ineligible players had been fielded in the men's Under-23, Under-20 and Under-17 teams between 2011 and 2015.

In January 2016, Wellington Phoenix signed Alex Jones on loan to the end of the 2015–16 season. The move fell through when New Zealand Football failed to forward the completed paperwork to FIFA before the transfer deadline despite having received it from the Phoenix three days previously. An appeal to the world governing body was unsuccessful, as FIFA "ruled to protect the integrity of their global deadlines for the transfer of players".

On 19 June 2018, a letter of complaint about current New Zealand women's national football team and New Zealand Football technical director Andreas Heraf signed by at least 10 players was sent to New Zealand football collated by the New Zealand Professional Footballers Association (NZPFA). Later that day it was also announced that New Zealand Football were deliberately flouting a FIFA directive that Heraf shouldn't be in charge of both roles at the same organisation.

The next day it emerge that the Players Union had sent a strongly worded letter to New Zealand Football, instructing them to discontinue all communications with players after Heraf and other New Zealand Football staff members were contacting players and strongly encouraging them not to write letters or issue any formal complaints.

That afternoon it was announced that Heraf would be place on special leave while an independent investigation was conducted into the allegations around bullying, intimidation and a culture of fear.

== See also ==
Men's

- List of New Zealand international footballers
- New Zealand men's national football team
- New Zealand national football B team
- New Zealand national under-23 football team
- New Zealand national under-20 football team
- New Zealand national under-19 schoolboys football team
- New Zealand national under-17 football team

Women's

- List of New Zealand women's international footballers
- New Zealand women's national football team
- New Zealand women's national under-20 football team
- New Zealand women's national under-17 football team
