= 1982 FIFA World Cup Group 6 =

Football tournament group stage

Group 6 was one of six groups of national teams competing in the First group stage of the 1982 FIFA World Cup. Play began on 14 June and ended on 23 June 1982. The group consisted of four teams: Seeded team Brazil, the Soviet Union, Scotland and World Cup debutants New Zealand.

Brazil won the group with three consecutive victories and advanced to the second round, along with the Soviet Union, who finished ahead of Scotland by virtue of goal difference.

== Standings ==
Pos	Team	Pld	W	D	L	GF	GA	GD	Pts	Qualification
1	Brazil	3	3	0	0	10	2	+8	6	Advance to second round
2	Soviet Union	3	1	1	1	6	4	+2	3	Advance to second round
3	Scotland	3	1	1	1	8	8	0	3	
4	New Zealand	3	0	0	3	2	12	−10	0	

Source: FIFA

== Matches ==
=== Brazil vs Soviet Union ===
14 June 1982
21:00 CEST

Brazil	2–1	Soviet Union
Sócrates 75'; Éder 88'		Bal 34'

Ramón Sánchez Pizjuán, Seville
Attendance: 68,000
Referee: Augusto Lamo Castillo (Spain)

Brazil	Soviet Union

GK	1	Waldir Peres
DF	2	Leandro
DF	3	Oscar
DF	4	Luizinho
DF	6	Júnior
MF	8	Sócrates (c)
MF	15	Falcão
MF	21	Dirceu	(substituted off) 46'
MF	10	Zico
FW	9	Serginho
FW	11	Éder
Substitutes:
GK	12	Paulo Sérgio
FW	7	Paulo Isidoro	(substituted on) 46'
DF	13	Edevaldo
DF	16	Edinho
MF	19	Renato
Manager:
Telê Santana

GK	1	Rinat Dasayev
DF	2	Tengiz Sulakvelidze
DF	3	Aleksandre Chivadze (c)
DF	5	Sergei Baltacha
DF	6	Anatoliy Demyanenko
MF	12	Andriy Bal
MF	8	Volodymyr Bezsonov
MF	13	Vitaly Daraselia
MF	9	Yuri Gavrilov	(substituted off) 74'
FW	11	Oleh Blokhin
FW	7	Ramaz Shengelia	(substituted off) 89'
Substitutes:
GK	22	Vyacheslav Chanov
MF	10	Khoren Oganesian
DF	14	Sergei Borovsky
FW	15	Sergey Andreyev	(substituted on) 89'
DF	18	Yuri Susloparov	(substituted on) 74'
Manager:
Konstantin Beskov

Assistant referees:
Victoriano Sánchez Arminio (Spain)
José Luis García Carrión (Spain)

=== Scotland vs New Zealand ===
15 June 1982
21:00 CEST

Scotland	5–2	New Zealand
Dalglish 18'; Wark 29', 32'; Robertson 73'; Archibald 79'		Sumner 54'; Wooddin 64'

La Rosaleda Stadium, Málaga
Attendance: 36,000
Referee: David Socha (United States)

Scotland	New Zealand

GK	1	Alan Rough
DF	2	Danny McGrain (c)
DF	5	Alan Hansen
DF	17	Allan Evans
DF	3	Frank Gray
MF	7	Gordon Strachan	(substituted off) 83'
MF	4	Graeme Souness
MF	10	John Wark
FW	9	Alan Brazil	(substituted off) 53'
FW	8	Kenny Dalglish
FW	11	John Robertson
Substitutes:
GK	12	George Wood
DF	6	Willie Miller
DF	14	David Narey	(substituted on) 83'
FW	15	Joe Jordan
FW	18	Steve Archibald	(substituted on) 53'
Manager:
Jock Stein

GK	22	Frank van Hattum
DF	15	John Hill
DF	6	Bobby Almond	(substituted off) 66'
DF	14	Adrian Elrick
DF	11	Sam Malcolmson	(substituted off) 77'
MF	12	Keith Mackay
MF	17	Allan Boath
MF	13	Kenny Cresswell
MF	10	Steve Sumner (c)
FW	7	Wynton Rufer
FW	9	Steve Wooddin
Substitutes:
GK	1	Richard Wilson
DF	2	Glenn Dods
DF	3	Ricki Herbert	(substituted on) 66'
MF	4	Brian Turner
MF	8	Duncan Cole	(substituted on) 77'
Manager:
(England) John Adshead

Assistant referees:
Thomson Chan (Hong Kong)
Yousef Alghoul (Libya)

=== Brazil vs Scotland ===
18 June 1982
21:00 CEST

Brazil	4–1	Scotland
Zico 33'; Oscar 48'; Éder 63'; Falcão 87'		Narey 18'

Estadio Benito Villamarín, Seville
Attendance: 47,379
Referee: Luis Paulino Siles (Costa Rica)

Brazil	Scotland

GK	1	Waldir Peres
DF	2	Leandro
DF	3	Oscar
DF	4	Luizinho
DF	6	Júnior
MF	15	Falcão
MF	8	Sócrates (c)
MF	5	Toninho Cerezo
MF	10	Zico
FW	9	Serginho	(substituted off) 80'
FW	11	Éder
Substitutes:
GK	12	Paulo Sérgio
FW	7	Paulo Isidoro	(substituted on) 80'
DF	13	Edevaldo
DF	16	Edinho
MF	19	Renato
Manager:
Telê Santana

GK	1	Alan Rough
DF	14	David Narey
DF	6	Willie Miller
DF	5	Alan Hansen
DF	3	Frank Gray
MF	4	Graeme Souness (c)
MF	10	John Wark
MF	7	Gordon Strachan	(substituted off) 65'
MF	16	Asa Hartford	(substituted off) 68'
FW	18	Steve Archibald
FW	11	John Robertson
Substitutes:
GK	12	George Wood
DF	2	Danny McGrain
FW	8	Kenny Dalglish	(substituted on) 65'
DF	13	Alex McLeish	(substituted on) 68'
FW	19	Paul Sturrock
Manager:
Jock Stein

Assistant referees:
Thomson Chan (Hong Kong)
Adolf Prokop (East Germany)

=== Soviet Union vs New Zealand ===
19 June 1982
21:00 CEST

Soviet Union	3–0	New Zealand
Gavrilov 24'; Blokhin 48'; Baltacha 68'

La Rosaleda Stadium, Málaga
Attendance: 19,000
Referee: Yousef Alghoul (Libya)

Soviet Union	New Zealand

GK	1	Rinat Dasayev
DF	6	Anatoliy Demyanenko
DF	3	Aleksandre Chivadze (c)
DF	5	Sergei Baltacha
DF	2	Tengiz Sulakvelidze
MF	8	Volodymyr Bezsonov
MF	13	Vitaly Daraselia	(substituted off) 46'
MF	12	Andriy Bal
MF	9	Yuri Gavrilov	(substituted off) 79'
FW	7	Ramaz Shengelia
FW	11	Oleh Blokhin
Substitutes:
GK	22	Vyacheslav Chanov
MF	10	Khoren Oganesian	(substituted on) 46'
DF	14	Sergei Borovsky
FW	15	Sergey Andreyev
DF	16	Sergey Rodionov	(substituted on) 79'
Manager:
Konstantin Beskov

GK	22	Frank van Hattum
DF	2	Glenn Dods
DF	17	Allan Boath
DF	3	Ricki Herbert
DF	14	Adrian Elrick
MF	12	Keith Mackay
MF	10	Steve Sumner (c)
MF	8	Duncan Cole
MF	13	Kenny Cresswell
FW	7	Wynton Rufer
FW	9	Steve Wooddin
Substitutes:
GK	1	Richard Wilson
MF	4	Brian Turner
DF	11	Sam Malcolmson
DF	15	John Hill
MF	19	Billy McClure
Manager:
(England) John Adshead

Assistant referees:
Emilio Soriano Aladrén (Spain)
Clive White (England)

=== Soviet Union vs Scotland ===
22 June 1982
21:00 CEST

Soviet Union	2–2	Scotland
Chivadze 59'; Shengelia 84'		Jordan 15'; Souness 86'

La Rosaleda Stadium, Málaga
Attendance: 45,000
Referee: Nicolae Rainea (Romania)

Soviet Union	Scotland

GK	1	Rinat Dasayev
SW	3	Aleksandre Chivadze (c)
DF	6	Anatoliy Demyanenko
DF	5	Sergei Baltacha
DF	2	Tengiz Sulakvelidze
MF	8	Volodymyr Bezsonov
MF	14	Sergei Borovsky
MF	12	Andriy Bal
FW	7	Ramaz Shengelia	(substituted off) 88'
FW	9	Yuri Gavrilov
FW	11	Oleh Blokhin
Substitutes:
GK	22	Vyacheslav Chanov
MF	10	Khoren Hovhannisyan
MF	13	Vitaly Daraselia
FW	15	Sergey Andreyev	(substituted on) 88'
DF	18	Yuri Susloparov
Manager:
Konstantin Beskov

GK	1	Alan Rough
SW	6	Willie Miller
DF	14	David Narey
DF	5	Alan Hansen
DF	3	Frank Gray
MF	7	Gordon Strachan		(substituted off) 71'
MF	4	Graeme Souness (c)	(yellow card) 5'
MF	10	John Wark
FW	18	Steve Archibald
FW	15	Joe Jordan		(substituted off) 71'
FW	11	John Robertson
Substitutes:
GK	12	George Wood
DF	2	Danny McGrain		(substituted on) 71'
FW	9	Alan Brazil		(substituted on) 71'
DF	13	Alex McLeish
FW	19	Paul Sturrock
Manager:
Jock Stein

Assistant referees:
Alojzy Jarguz (Poland)
Alexis Ponnet (Belgium)

=== Brazil vs New Zealand ===
23 June 1982
21:00 CEST

Brazil	4–0	New Zealand
Zico 28', 31'; Falcão 64'; Serginho 70'

Estadio Benito Villamarín, Seville
Attendance: 43,000
Referee: Damir Matovinović (Yugoslavia)

Brazil	New Zealand

GK	1	Waldir Peres
DF	2	Leandro
DF	3	Oscar	(substituted off) 75'
DF	4	Luizinho
DF	6	Júnior
MF	15	Falcão
MF	8	Sócrates (c)
MF	5	Toninho Cerezo
MF	10	Zico
FW	9	Serginho	(substituted off) 75'
FW	11	Éder
Substitutes:
GK	12	Paulo Sérgio
FW	7	Paulo Isidoro	(substituted on) 75'
DF	13	Edevaldo
DF	16	Edinho	(substituted on) 75'
MF	19	Renato
Manager:
Telê Santana

GK	22	Frank van Hattum
DF	2	Glenn Dods
DF	3	Ricki Herbert
DF	6	Bobby Almond
DF	14	Adrian Elrick
MF	17	Allan Boath
MF	12	Keith Mackay
MF	13	Kenny Cresswell	(substituted off) 78'
MF	10	Steve Sumner (c)
FW	9	Steve Wooddin
FW	7	Wynton Rufer	(substituted off) 78'
Substitutes:
GK	1	Richard Wilson
MF	4	Brian Turner	(substituted on) 78'
MF	8	Duncan Cole	(substituted on) 78'
DF	15	John Hill
DF	16	Glen Adam
Manager:
(England) John Adshead

Assistant referees:
Abraham Klein (Israel)
Charles Corver (Netherlands)

== See also ==
- Brazil at the FIFA World Cup
- New Zealand at the FIFA World Cup
- Scotland at the FIFA World Cup
- Soviet Union at the FIFA World Cup
