= New Zealand at the FIFA World Cup =

International football delegation

New Zealand has appeared in the FIFA World Cup three times, in 1982, 2010 and 2026. The men's national team, known as the All Whites, became the first Oceania Football Confederation member to reach the finals when it qualified for the 1982 tournament in Spain. At the 2010 finals in South Africa the team drew all three group matches and was the only nation to remain unbeaten, although it did not reach the knockout stage. The team returned at the 2026 finals in North America after taking the OFC's first direct qualifying place.

New Zealand's opening matches were during the 1970 AFC/OFC qualifiers losing away to Israel 4–0 and 2–0, and eliminated. For the 1974 AFC/OFC qualification they drew three matches and finished bottom of the group behind Australia, Iraq and Indonesia. In the 1978 AFC/OFC qualification matches, with an opening 6–0 win against Taiwan, they finished behind Australia. In the 1982 AFC/OFC qualification they topped the first round group, ahead of Australia, then finished behind Kuwait in the final round, before defeating China 2–1 to qualify for the 1982 World Cup final tournament. In the group stage New Zealand lost their opening match 5–2 to Scotland, then lost to the Soviet Union 3–0 and Brazil 4–0, exiting the tournament.

For both the 1986 and 1990 OFC qualifying groups, New Zealand finished third behind Australia and Israel. (Note: Israel and Taiwan both competed with OFC for political reasons in 1986 and 1990) With an expanded OFC competition from 1994 onwards, New Zealand topped their group ahead of Fiji but in the second round they were defeated by Australia 4–0 in aggregate. In the 1998 qualification edition they finished ahead of Fiji, and then lost 5–0 in aggregate to Australia. With four out of four wins in the group stage for the 2002 OFC qualifiers, Australia defeated New Zealand 6–1 in aggregate in the second round. With losses to Australia and Vanuatu, New Zealand did not advance from the first round in the 2006 qualification edition.

New Zealand won their second round group in the 2010 OFC qualifiers and then went on to defeat Bahrain 1–0 in aggregate to qualify for the 2010 World Cup finals. In the group stage, New Zealand opened against Slovakia with a 1–1 draw, then again drew 1–1 with holders Italy, followed by a 0–0 stalemate against Paraguay. Finishing third in the group, they failed to advance. Despite the early exit, New Zealand were the only team not to lose a match at the 2010 finals. The side had begun the tournament ranked 78th in the world. In the 2014 qualifiers, they topped their third round group, despite an earlier loss to New Caledonia, and then lost in the playoff 9–3 in aggregate to Mexico. They topped their group in the 2018 qualifiers, then defeated the Solomon Islands, before losing to Peru in the final play-off spot. In the 2022 qualifiers, five wins and a final 5–0 win against the Solomon Islands, followed by a 1–0 loss to Costa Rica resulted in non-qualification. For the 2026 World Cup the enlarged 48-team finals gave the OFC its first direct entry, which New Zealand claimed on 24 March 2025 with a 3–0 win over New Caledonia at Eden Park. New Zealand had won all five of its qualifying matches, scoring 29 goals and conceding one.

== FIFA World Cup record ==
FIFA World Cup record											Qualification record						
Year	Host	Round	Pos.	Pld	W	D	L	GF	GA	Squad	Pos.	Pld	W	D	L	GF	GA
1930 to 1938		Not member of FIFA									Not member of FIFA						
1950 to 1966		Did not enter									Did not enter						
1970	Mexico	Did not qualify									2nd round	2	0	0	2	0	6
1974	West Germany	Did not qualify									1st round	6	0	3	3	5	12
1978	Argentina	Did not qualify									1st round	4	2	1	1	14	4
1982	Spain	Group stage	23rd	3	0	0	3	2	12	Squad	Qualified	15	9	5	1	44	10
1986	Mexico	Did not qualify									3rd	6	3	1	2	13	7
1990	Italy	Did not qualify									3rd	6	3	1	2	13	8
1994	United States	Did not qualify									2nd round	6	3	1	2	15	5
1998	France	Did not qualify									3rd round	6	3	0	3	13	6
2002	South Korea; Japan	Did not qualify									2nd round	6	4	0	2	20	7
2006	Germany	Did not qualify									3rd	5	3	0	2	17	5
2010	South Africa	Group stage	22nd	3	0	3	0	2	2	Squad	Qualified	8	6	1	1	15	5
2014	Brazil	Did not qualify									Play-off	13	9	1	3	28	18
2018	Russia	Did not qualify									Play-off	13	8	4	1	24	6
2022	Qatar	Did not qualify									Play-off	6	5	0	1	18	2
2026	Canada; Mexico; United States	Group stage	40th	3	0	1	2	4	10	Squad	Qualified	5	5	0	0	29	1
2030	Morocco; Portugal; Spain	To be determined									To be determined						
2034	Saudi Arabia	To be determined									To be determined						
Total		Group stage	3/23	9	0	4	5	8	24	—	—	107	63	18	26	268	102

=== By match ===
Year	Round	Opponent	Score	Result	Venue	New Zealand scorers
1982	Group stage	Scotland	2–5	L	Málaga	S. Sumner, S. Wooddin
1982	Group stage	Soviet Union	0–3	L	Málaga	—N/a
1982	Group stage	Brazil	0–4	L	Seville	—N/a
2010	Group stage	Slovakia	1–1	D	Rustenburg	W. Reid
2010	Group stage	Italy	1–1	D	Nelspruit	S. Smeltz
2010	Group stage	Paraguay	0–0	D	Polokwane	—N/a
2026	Group stage	Iran	2–2	D	Inglewood	E. Just (2)
2026	Group stage	Egypt	1–3	L	Vancouver	F. Surman
2026	Group stage	Belgium	1–5	L	Vancouver	E. Just

== Head-to-head record ==
Opponent	Pld	W	D	L	GF	GA	GD	Win %
Belgium	1	0	0	1	1	5	−4	0.00
Brazil	1	0	0	1	0	4	−4	0.00
Egypt	1	0	0	1	1	3	−2	0.00
Iran	1	0	1	0	2	2	+0	0.00
Italy	1	0	1	0	1	1	+0	0.00
Paraguay	1	0	1	0	0	0	+0	0.00
Scotland	1	0	0	1	2	5	−3	0.00
Slovakia	1	0	1	0	1	1	+0	0.00
Soviet Union	1	0	0	1	0	3	−3	0.00
Total	9	0	4	5	8	24	−16	0.00

== 1982 FIFA World Cup ==
New Zealand's run to the 1982 finals took 15 matches and included a 13–0 win over Fiji in which captain Steve Sumner scored six goals, at the time a record margin in World Cup qualifying. A 2–1 win over China in a Singapore play-off secured the final place at the tournament.

=== Group 6 ===
Pos	Team	Pld	W	D	L	GF	GA	GD	Pts	Qualification
1	Brazil	3	3	0	0	10	2	+8	6	Advance to second round
2	Soviet Union	3	1	1	1	6	4	+2	3	Advance to second round
3	Scotland	3	1	1	1	8	8	0	3	
4	New Zealand	3	0	0	3	2	12	−10	0	

Source: FIFA
15 June 1982
21:00 CEST

Scotland	5–2	New Zealand
Dalglish 18'; Wark 29', 32'; Robertson 73'; Archibald 79'	Report	Sumner 54'; Wooddin 64'

La Rosaleda Stadium, Málaga
Attendance: 36,000
Referee: David Socha (United States)

19 June 1982
21:00 CEST

Soviet Union	3–0	New Zealand
Gavrilov 24'; Blokhin 48'; Baltacha 68'	Report

La Rosaleda Stadium, Málaga
Attendance: 19,000
Referee: Yousef Alghoul (Libya)

23 June 1982
21:00 CEST

Brazil	4–0	New Zealand
Zico 28', 31'; Falcão 64'; Serginho 70'	Report

Estadio Benito Villamarín, Seville
Attendance: 43,000
Referee: Damir Matovinović (Yugoslavia)

== 2010 FIFA World Cup ==
=== Group F ===
Pos	Team	Pld	W	D	L	GF	GA	GD	Pts	Qualification
1	Paraguay	3	1	2	0	3	1	+2	5	Advance to knockout stage
2	Slovakia	3	1	1	1	4	5	−1	4	Advance to knockout stage
3	New Zealand	3	0	3	0	2	2	0	3	
4	Italy	3	0	2	1	4	5	−1	2	

Source: FIFA
Rules for classification: Tie-breaking criteria
15 June 2010
13:30

New Zealand	1–1	Slovakia
Reid 90+3'	Report	Vittek 50'

Royal Bafokeng Stadium, Rustenburg
Attendance: 23,871
Referee: Jerome Damon (South Africa)

20 June 2010
16:00

Italy	1–1	New Zealand
Iaquinta 29' (pen.)	Report	Smeltz 7'

Mbombela Stadium, Nelspruit
Attendance: 38,229
Referee: Carlos Batres (Guatemala)

24 June 2010
16:00

Paraguay	0–0	New Zealand
	Report

Peter Mokaba Stadium, Polokwane
Attendance: 34,850
Referee: Yuichi Nishimura (Japan)

== 2026 FIFA World Cup ==
New Zealand were drawn in Group G alongside Iran, Egypt and Belgium. A 2–2 draw with Iran in the opening match brought a brace for Elijah Just, who became the first New Zealand player to score twice in a World Cup match, but defeats by Egypt and Belgium left the team bottom of the group.

=== Group stage ===
Pos	Team	Pld	W	D	L	GF	GA	GD	Pts	Qualification
1	Belgium	3	1	2	0	6	2	+4	5 (Note: Tied on head-to-head result (Belgium 1–1 Egypt). Overall goal difference was used as the tiebreaker.)	Advance to knockout stage
2	Egypt	3	1	2	0	5	3	+2	5	Advance to knockout stage
3	Iran	3	0	3	0	3	3	0	3	
4	New Zealand	3	0	1	2	4	10	−6	1	

Source: FIFA
Notes:
June 15, 2026
6:00 p.m. UTC−7

Iran	2–2	New Zealand
Rezaeian 32'; Mohebi 64'	(Note: "IR Iran vs New Zealand | First Stage | FIFA World Cup 2026". FIFA. Retrieved June 15, 2026.; "Match Report – Group G – IR Iran v. New Zealand". FIFA. June 15, 2026. Retrieved June 16, 2026.; "Post match summary report – Group G – IR Iran v. New Zealand". FIFA. June 15, 2026. Retrieved June 16, 2026.)	Just 7', 54'

SoFi Stadium, Inglewood
Attendance: 70,108
Referee: César Arturo Ramos (Mexico)

June 21, 2026
6:00 p.m. UTC−7

New Zealand	1–3	Egypt
Surman 15'	(Note: "New Zealand vs Egypt | First Stage | FIFA World Cup 2026". FIFA. Retrieved June 22, 2026.; "Match Report – Group G – New Zealand v. Egypt". FIFA. June 22, 2026. Retrieved June 22, 2026.; "Post match summary report – Group G – New Zealand v. Egypt". FIFA. June 22, 2026. Retrieved June 22, 2026.)	Ziko 58'; Salah 67'; Trézéguet 82'

BC Place, Vancouver
Attendance: 52,497
Referee: Omar Al Ali (United Arab Emirates)

June 26, 2026
8:00 p.m. UTC−7

New Zealand	1–5	Belgium
Just 84'	(Note: "New Zealand vs Belgium | First Stage | FIFA World Cup 2026". FIFA. Retrieved June 27, 2026.; "Match Report – Group G – New Zealand v. Belgium". FIFA. June 27, 2026. Retrieved June 27, 2026.; "Post match summary report – Group G – New Zealand v. Belgium". FIFA. June 27, 2026. Retrieved June 27, 2026.)	Trossard 28', 50'; De Bruyne 66'; Lukaku 86'; Saelemaekers 90+4'

BC Place, Vancouver
Attendance: 52,497
Referee: Adham Makhadmeh (Jordan)

== Goalscorers ==
On 15 June 1982, Steve Sumner made history by scoring New Zealand's first-ever FIFA World Cup goal, coming in the 54th minute of their opening match against Scotland in Málaga.

Player	Goals	1982	2010	2026
Elijah Just	3			3
Steve Sumner	1	1		
Steve Wooddin	1	1		
Winston Reid	1		1	
Shane Smeltz	1		1	
Finn Surman	1			1
Total	8	2	2	4

== See also ==
- New Zealand men's national football team results
- New Zealand at the FIFA Confederations Cup
- New Zealand at the OFC Nations Cup
- Oceanian nations at the FIFA World Cup
