= Oceanian nations at the FIFA World Cup =

International football delegations

Association football is one of the popular sports in Oceania, and 2 members of the Oceania Football Confederation (OFC) have competed at the sport's biggest event – the men's FIFA World Cup. OFC countries have never hosted the finals so far.

== Overview ==
	1930 (Uruguay) (13)	1934 (Italy) (16)	1938 (France) (15)	1950 (Brazil) (13)	1954 (Switzerland) (16)	1958 (Sweden) (16)	1962 (Chile) (16)	1966 (England) (16)	1970 (Mexico) (16)	1974 (West Germany) (16)	1978 (Argentina) (16)	1982 (Spain) (24)	1986 (Mexico) (24)	1990 (Italy) (24)	1994 (United States) (24)	1998 (France) (32)	2002 (South Korea) (Japan) (32)	2006 (Germany) (32)	2010 (South Africa) (32)	2014 (Brazil) (32)	2018 (Russia) (32)	2022 (Qatar) (32)	2026 (Canada) (Mexico) (United States) (48)	2030 (Morocco) (Portugal) (Spain) (48)	2034 (Saudi Arabia) (48)	Total
Teams	0	0	0	0	0	0	0	0	0	(Australia) (Note: The Oceanian teams in 1974 (Australia) and 1982 (New Zealand) both qualified after playing in a continental zone consisting of Asian and Oceanian teams.)	0	(New Zealand)	0	0	0	0	0	(Australia) (Note: Australia's qualification in 2006 was through the Oceanian zone as they were an OFC member during qualifying. However, on 1 January 2006, they left the OFC and joined the AFC.)	(New Zealand)	0	0	0	(New Zealand)			5
Top 32	—	—	—	—	—	—	—	—	—	—	—	—	—	—	—	—	—	—	—	—	—	—	0			0
Top 16	—	—	—	—	—	—	—	—	—	—	—	0 (Note: In 1982, the second round featured 12 teams of which 4 advanced to the semi-finals.)	0	0	0	0	0	1	0	0	0	0	0			1
Top 8	—	0	0	—	0	0	0	0	0	0	0	0	0	0	0	0	0	0	0	0	0	0	0			0
Top 4	0	0	0	0	0	0	0	0	0	0	0	0	0	0	0	0	0	0	0	0	0	0	0			0
Top 2	0	0	0	0	0	0	0	0	0	0	0	0	0	0	0	0	0	0	0	0	0	0	0			0
1st																										0
2nd																										0
3rd																										0
4th																										0

Country	#	Years	Best result
**New Zealand**	3	1982, 2010, 2026	GS
**Australia** (Note: In 1974 and 2006 Australia qualified through OFC qualifying competition however the Football Federation Australia officially left the OFC and joined the AFC on 1 January 2006. They qualified in 2010, 2014, 2018, 2022, and 2026 as a member of AFC.)	2	1974, **2006** (2010, 2014, 2018, **2022**, 2026 from the AFC)	R16

- **Bold** indicates year(s) of best finish

== Results ==
=== Tournament standings ===
Table only includes appearances of teams when qualified as members of OFC.

Team	Champions	Final	Semi-finals	Quarter-finals (Note: Knockout round of 8: 1934–1938, 1954–1970, and 1986–present; second group stage, top 8: 1974–1978)	Round of 16 (Note: Second group stage, top 12: 1982; knockout round of 16: 1986–present)	Round of 32 (Note: Knockout round of 32: 2026–present)
Australia	0	0	0	0	1	0

=== Team results by tournament ===
The team ranking in each tournament is according to FIFA. The rankings, apart from the top four positions (top two in 1930), are not a result of direct competition between the teams; instead, teams eliminated in the same round are ranked by their full results in the tournament.

For each tournament, the number of teams in each finals tournament (in brackets) are shown.

FIFA World Cup results of OFC members
Team	1930 (Uruguay) (13)	1934 (Italy) (16)	1938 (France) (15)	1950 (Brazil) (13)	1954 (Switzerland) (16)	1958 (Sweden) (16)	1962 (Chile) (16)	1966 (England) (16)	1970 (Mexico) (16)	1974 (West Germany) (16)	1978 (Argentina) (16)	1982 (Spain) (24)	1986 (Mexico) (24)	1990 (Italy) (24)	1994 (United States) (24)	1998 (France) (32)	2002 (South Korea) (Japan) (32)	2006 (Germany) (32)	2010 (South Africa) (32)	2014 (Brazil) (32)	2018 (Russia) (32)	2022 (Qatar) (32)	2026 (Canada) (Mexico) (United States) (48)	2030 (Morocco) (Portugal) (Spain) (48)	2034 (Saudi Arabia) (48)	Total	Qual. Comp.
Australia	—N/a							•	•	GS1; 14th	•	•	•	•	•	•	•	R16; 16th	GS; 21st	GS; 30th	GS; 30th	R16; 11th	R32; 22nd	TBD	TBD	2	11
Australia	—N/a							•	•	GS1; 14th	•	•	•	•	•	•	•	R16; 16th	Member of AFC							2	11
New Zealand	—N/a								•	•	•	GS; 23rd	•	•	•	•	•	•	GS; 22nd	•	•	•	GS; 40th	TBD	TBD	3	15

Legend

1st	Champions
2nd	Runners-up
3rd	Third place
4th	Fourth place
QF	Quarter-finals (1934–1938, 1954–1970, 1986–present)
R16	Knockout round of 16 (1934–1938, 1986–present)
R32	Knockout round of 32 (2026–present)
GS	Group stage (1930, 1950–1970, 1986–present)
GS1	First group stage (1974–1982)
GS2	Second group stage (1974–1982)

Q	Qualified for upcoming tournament
TBD	To be determined (may still qualify for upcoming tournament)
•	Did not qualify
	Did not enter
—N/a	Not a FIFA member

=== Overall team records ===
As per statistical convention in football, matches decided in extra time are counted as wins and losses, while matches decided by penalty shoot-outs are counted as draws. 3 points per win, 1 point per draw and 0 points per loss. Table only includes appearances of teams when qualified as members of OFC.

As of 2026 FIFA World Cup

Team	Part	Pld	W	D	L	GF	GA	GD	Pts
Australia	2	7	1	2	4	5	11	−6	5
New Zealand	3	9	0	4	5	8	24	−16	4

== Appearances ==
=== Ranking of teams by number of appearances ===
Only includes appearances of teams when qualified as members of OFC.

Team	Appearances	Record streak	Active streak	Debut	Most recent	Best result
New Zealand	3	1	1	1982	2026	Group stage
Australia	2	1	—N/a	1974	2006	Round of 16 (2006)

=== Team debuts ===
Year	Debutants	Total
1974	Australia	1
1982	New Zealand	1
Total		2

=== Not qualified ===
10 of the 11 active FIFA and OFC members have never qualified for the final tournament.

Country	Number of qualifying attempts	1930 (Uruguay)	1934 (Italy)	1938 (France)	1950 (Brazil)	1954 (Switzerland)	1958 (Sweden)	1962 (Chile)	1966 (England)	1970 (Mexico)	1974 (West Germany)	1978 (Argentina)	1982 (Spain)	1986 (Mexico)	1990 (Italy)	1994 (United States)	1998 (France)	2002 (South Korea) (Japan)	2006 (Germany)	2010 (South Africa)	2014 (Brazil)	2018 (Russia)	2022 (Qatar)	2026 (Canada) (Mexico) (United States)	2030 (Morocco) (Portugal) (Spain)	2034 (Saudi Arabia)
Fiji	11	—N/a											•		•	•	•	•	•	•	•	•	•	•	TBD	TBD
Solomon Islands	9	—N/a														•	•	•	•	•	•	•	•	•	TBD	TBD
Tahiti	9	—N/a														•	•	•	•	•	•	•	•	•	TBD	TBD
Cook Islands	8	—N/a															•	•	•	•	•	•	•×	•	TBD	TBD
Vanuatu	8	—N/a														•	•	•	•	•	•	•	×	•	TBD	TBD
Samoa (Note: Samoa entered qualifying in 1994 and 1998 as Western Samoa, but withdrew before playing matches in 1994.)	7	—N/a														×	•	•	•	•	•	•	×	•	TBD	TBD
Tonga	7	—N/a															•	•	•	•	•	•	×	•	TBD	TBD
American Samoa	6	—N/a																•	•	•	•	•	×	•	TBD	TBD
Papua New Guinea	6	—N/a															•		•	×	•	•	•	•	TBD	TBD
New Caledonia	6	—N/a																	•	•	•	•	•	•	TBD	TBD

Legend

TBD	To be determined (may still qualify for upcoming tournament)
•	Did not qualify
•×	Withdrew or disqualified during qualification (after playing matches)
×	Withdrew before qualification / Banned / Entry not accepted by FIFA
	Did not enter
—N/a	Not a FIFA member

== Summary of performance ==
This table shows for each world cup the number of countries at the World Cup, the number of entries (#E) from around the world including any rejections and withdrawals, the number of Oceanian entries (#A), how many of those Oceanian entries withdrew (#A-) before/during qualification or were rejected by FIFA, the Oceanian representatives at the World Cup finals, the number of World Cup Qualifiers each Oceanian representative had to play to get to the World Cup (#WCQ), the furthest stage they reached, their results, and their coaches.

Year	Host(s)	Size	#E	#A	#A-	Oceanian finalists	#WCQ	Stage	Results	Coach
1930	Uruguay	13	13	0	0	–				
1934	Italy	16	32	0	0	–				
1938	France	15	37	0	0	–				
1950	Brazil	13	34	0	0	–				
1954	Switzerland	16	45	0	0	–				
1958	Sweden	16	56	0	0	–				
1962	Chile	16	56	0	0	–				
1966	England	16	74	1	0	-				
1970	Mexico	16	75	2	0	-				
1974	West Germany	16	99	2	0	Australia	11	Group stage	lost 0–2 East Germany, lost 0–3 West Germany, drew 0–0 Chile	(Australia) Ralé Rašić
1978	Argentina	16	107	2	0	-				
1982	Spain	24	109	3	0	New Zealand	15	Group stage	lost 2–5 Scotland, lost 0–3 Soviet Union, lost 0–4 Brazil	(England) John Adshead
1986	Mexico	24	121	4	0	-				
1990	Italy	24	116	5	0	-				
1994	USA	24	147	7	1	-				
1998	France	32	174	10	0	-				
2002	South Korea and Japan	32	199	10	2	-				
2006	Germany	32	197	12	0	Australia	9	Round of 16	won 3–1 Japan, lost 0–2 Brazil, drew 2–2 Croatia; R16: lost 0–1 Italy	(Netherlands) Guus Hiddink
2010	South Africa	32	204	11	0	New Zealand	8	Group stage	drew 1–1 Slovakia, drew 1–1 Italy, drew 0–0 Paraguay	(New Zealand) Ricki Herbert
2014	Brazil	32	207	11	0	-				
2018	Russia	32	210	11	0	-				
2022	Qatar	32	210	11	5	-				
2026	Canada, Mexico, United States	48	208	11	0	New Zealand	5	Group stage	drew 2–2 Iran, lost 1–3 Egypt, lost 1–5 Belgium	(England) Darren Bazeley

== Competitive record ==
=== 1930–1970: World Cup without Oceania ===
Until 1966 Oceanian nations did not enter the FIFA World Cup. Australia started first time at the 1966 World Cup qualification. In First Round Australia byes and advanced to the AFC–OFC first round directly. In Final Round the AFC winner would have to play the 3 African teams on a home-and-away basis. The winner would qualify. South Africa was suspended by FIFA due to apartheid. All fifteen remaining African teams withdrew in protest against there being no automatic qualification for an African team, leaving the AFC–OFC winner to qualify by default. South Korea then withdrew because the 3 team tournament was moved from Japan to Cambodia, leaving only Australia and North Korea to contest the final place. North Korea easily won both legs to qualify. At the 1970 World Cup qualification participated 2 countries from Oceania. New Zealand bye and advanced to the Second Round directly, Australia, Japan and South Korea, played against each other twice in South Korea. The group winner Australia advance to the Second Round. In the Second Round group 1 Australia won against Rhodesia and advanced to the Final Round. New Zealand in the Second Round group 2 lost by Israel and withdrew. In the Final Round Australia lost on aggregate 1–2 by Israel.

=== 1974: First Oceanian team at the World Cup ===
Australia was the first (OFC) nation at the FIFA World Cup. The road to the 1974 World Cup began with a series of home and away matches against Iraq, New Zealand, and Indonesia. New Zealand lost all three matches. The Socceroos, having won this tournament, then played and won a two-legged fixture against one of the Socceroos' biggest rivals Iran, managing to hold on to a slim overall lead in front of 120,000 Iranian fans in the Azadi Stadium, Tehran, during the second leg. South Korea, having itself knocked out Israel at the equivalent stage, was then drawn as Australia's final hurdle. Over the course of another two-legged playoff the scores remained even, and so a deciding match was played in Hong Kong. Australia won this match, through a Jimmy Mackay goal, scored off a free kick. Australia were drawn into Group A consisting of hosts and favourites West Germany, East Germany and Chile. Australia held the East German's 0–0 at half-time before defender Colin Curran deflected the ball into his own net early in the second half. East German striker Joachim Streich then secured the points with a goal halfway through the second half, with the game finishing 2–0. Australia lost their following match to West Germany 3–0 with goals to Wolfgang Overath, Bernhard Cullmann and star-striker Gerd Müller. Having lost both their opening games, Australia could not proceed further in the tournament and the Australians managed to hold Chile to a scoreless draw, seeing Australia earn its first ever World Cup finals point. It was to be the last appearance for the Australian team until the World Cup tournament returned to Germany more than three decades later.

=== 1978: The successful qualification ===
A total of 21 AFC and OFC teams and Israel entered the competition. Australia and New Zealand competed in Group 5. New Zealand remained 2 place, Australia 1. Australia advanced to the Final Round and remained 4th place of 5 nations.

=== 1982: New Zealand qualifying to the World Cup ===
A total of 21 AFC and OFC teams entered the competition. However, Iran withdrew before the draw was made. For the first time, the World Cup finals expanded from 16 to 24 teams. This allowed more teams, especially from Africa and Asia, to participate. New Zealand, Australia, Fiji got to group 1 and respectively ranked 1, 2, 5 places. Only New Zealand advanced to the Final Round. China PR and New Zealand finished level on points and goal difference, and a play-off on neutral ground was played to decide who would qualify. Match between New Zealand – China was played in Singapore. New Zealand won 2–1 and participated in the World Cup for the first time. New Zealand lost 2–5 Scotland in their first game at the World Cup, 0–3 USSR, 0–4 Brazil and were eliminated. At the ranking finished 23 of 24.

=== 1986–2002: Five World Cups in a row without Oceania ===
In the 1986 World Cup qualification the Oceanian zone was allocated 0.5 places (out of 24) in the final tournament. Two OFC teams entered the competition. Moreover, Israel and Chinese Taipei were also assigned to the Oceanian zone despite not being OFC members. New Zealand remained in position 3, Australia in 1 position. The winning team of the OFC qualification tournament will play with UEFA member Scotland in a home-and-away play-off. The winner of this play-off qualifies for the 1986 FIFA World Cup. Australia lost 0–2 on aggregate and did not qualifying to the World Cup.

In the 1990 World Cup qualification entered five OFC teams. There were two rounds of play. In the first round Israel received a bye and advanced to the final round directly. The remaining four teams were paired up to play knockout matches on a home-and-away basis. Australia and New Zealand easily won and go to the second round. Israel won Second Round, eliminated Australia and New Zealand.

In order to qualify for USA 94, Oceanian nations had to endure 3 playoff stages. A total of 7 teams entered the competition. However, Samoa withdrew. The first stage was the Oceania playoff. Australia and New Zealand finished on top of Group 1 and Group 2. Tahiti, the Solomon Islands, Vanuatu first time participated at the FIFA World Cup qualification. Australia played New Zealand in the Oceania playoff. The first leg was played in New Zealand on 30 May 1993, with Australia winning the game 1–0. Australia won the return leg 3–0 to win the playoff stage with a 4–0 aggregate score. Having won the Oceania playoff, Australia now had to win a 2-leg playoff against Canada, the CONCACAF runner up. The first leg was played in Canada on 31 July 1993, with the Canadians winning the 1st leg 2–1. In the second leg, which was played on 15 August 1993 in Sydney, Australia managed a 2–1 win which saw the game go into extra time after a 3–3 aggregate scoreline. The game went into a penalty shoot-out which was won by Australia 4–1. Australia then qualified for the 2-leg playoff against the South American group 1 runner up, Argentina. The first leg was played in Sydney on 31 October 1993. The 1st leg ended with a 1–1 draw. On 17 November 1993, the second leg was played in Argentina, with Argentina winning 1–0 and denying Australia a place at the 1994 World Cup in the United States. After the game Argentine legend Diego Maradona was so impressed with the Socceroos performance that he said to then captain Paul Wade "Your tears of pain, will one day be tears of joy". Just to qualify for the 1994 World Cup Australia would have had to beat Argentina, the runners-up from the 1990 World Cup, and ranked 9th in the world at that time.

At 1998 World Cup qualification Australia, New Zealand, Fiji and Tahiti, the four best ranked teams according to FIFA, received byes and advanced to the Second Round directly. Papua New Guinea, Tonga, Papua New Guinea, Samoa, Cook Islands first time participated at the FIFA World Cup qualification. Australia and New Zealand easily won in the Second Round and go to the Final round. Australia won 5–0 on aggregate. After winning the qualifying tournament, Australia had to play Iran over two legs in one week, with the winner progressing to the World Cup finals to be held in France. Australia, under coach Terry Venables, tied the away leg 1–1 and looked like they were going to proceed to the finals in France, initially leading 2–0 in the home game in Melbourne, until Iran managed to score two late goals to tie the game and progress to the finals on the away goals rule. This match has been named one of the most memorable matches by many of the retired Australian and Iranian football players. At the time the crowd that packed the MCG was the highest ever for an association football match in Australia.

A total of 10 teams entered the 2002 World Cup competition. The Oceanian zone was allocated 0.5 places (out of 32) in the final tournament. American Samoa first time participated at the FIFA World Cup qualification. New Caladonia, Papua New Guinea did not enter. Australia again won the qualifying tournament for 2002 FIFA World Cup. Second and third-string line-ups thrashed a number of tiny island nations in a competition that made a mockery of the Confederation, including a world-record 22–0 win against Tonga, then smashed that record with a 31–0 win over American Samoa only two days later. Still missing Harry Kewell and Mark Viduka, Australia comfortably beat New Zealand, their only real threat in the Oceania confederation. Australia then once again had to win a two leg playoff in November, in order to advance to the World Cup finals to be held in South Korea and Japan. On this occasion the opposition was the 5th placed South American team, Uruguay. In the preceding four months Uruguay's preparation had been six World Cup qualifying matches, as follows: beat #2 ranked Brazil 1:0; drew 1:1 with #8 ranked Colombia; drew 1:1 with #2 ranked Argentina. In contrast, Australia's preparation had included no qualifying games since two matches in 4 days in June, against #81 ranked New Zealand, although had played two friendly matches – a loss to Japan in August and a 1:1 draw with France in November. In the first leg in Melbourne, Australia won 1–0 after Kevin Muscat scored from a penalty kick; however, Australia's qualification campaign ended unsuccessfully as they lost 3–0 in the away leg in Montevideo just five days later with the South Americans proving too strong.

=== 2006: Australia reaches the Round of 16 ===
A total of 10 teams entered the 2006 World Cup competition. The competition was composed of three rounds. Australia and New Zealand entered the competition directly in the Second Round. The other 10 teams were divided in two groups of five teams each, and played against each other once. In the Second Round buckled surprise. Australia drew 2–2 with the Solomon Islands, which combined with other results put that team ahead of New Zealand in the standings and meaning that the Solomon Islands qualified for the final playoff rather than the expected New Zealand. On 22 July 2005, Guus Hiddink was announced by FIFA as the new national coach. This announcement came after intense speculation by the Australian media over potential candidates and even a premature announcement from Hiddink himself. After some initial training sessions with the Australian team in the Netherlands, his first campaign as national coach resulted in an 11–1 aggregate win over the Solomon Islands in the OFC Qualifying Tournament Final. The remaining task for Hiddink and Australia was the Oceania-South America playoff against the fifth placed team from the CONMEBOL Qualifying Tournament for a place in the World Cup. Australia, ranked #49, then moved on to play 18th ranked Uruguay in a rematch of the qualifying matches in 2001. Again, there was a huge contrast in preparation. Australia had only two recent qualifying matches, against #138 Solomon Islands, only three days apart. Uruguay's preparation had included four qualifying matches, in the previous two months, including: beaten #26 Colombia, drawn with #33 Ecuador, and beaten #4 Argentina. Uruguay defeated Australia 1–0 in Montevideo on 12 November 2005, after a header from Dario Rodriguez. Australia had the better of their Uruguayan opponents for a lot of the match, but they could not capitalise on their opportunities. In Sydney, on 16 November for the second leg of the qualifying series and in front of 82,698 fans at Telstra Stadium, Australia led Uruguay 1–0 after 90 minutes following a goal by Mark Bresciano in the first half. The aggregate was tied, and extra time was played. Neither team scored after two periods of extra time, bringing the game to a penalty shoot-out. Australia won the penalty shoot-out 4–2, making Australia the first ever team to qualify for a World Cup via a penalty shoot-out. Australian goalkeeper Mark Schwarzer made two saves and John Aloisi scored the winning penalty. The resulting win led to scenes of celebration across the country, as the Socceroos qualifying for the 2006 FIFA World Cup in Germany, their first qualification in 32 years.

On 12 June 2006 at FIFA World Cup, the Socceroos defeated Japan 3–1 in their opening game in Kaiserslautern, with Tim Cahill scoring two goals (84', 89') and John Aloisi scoring one (92+') in the last eight minutes to claim their first World Cup finals victory. Cahill goals were the first ever scored by Australia in the World Cup Finals, and Australia became the first team in the 2006 tournament to come back after being 1–0 down. Also, no other team has scored three goals in the last seven minutes of a match in World Cup finals history. Australia met Brazil in their second Group F game in Munich on 18 June. The Australians held Brazil to a 0–0 half time scoreline before Adriano put Brazil in front (49'). Brazil substitute Fred scored (90') with the help of substitute Robinho to give Brazil a 2–0 win, which saw the Brazilians go through to the second round. On 22 June, Australia faced Croatia in Stuttgart. The final score was 2–2. A goal from Darijo Srna in the second minute put Australia on the back foot. Australia equalised with a penalty goal from Craig Moore (38') after Croatian defender Stjepan Tomas handballed near the Croatian goal. Niko Kovac gave Croatia a 2–1 lead after halftime before Australia equalised again through Harry Kewell (79'). As Brazil beat Japan 4–1, Australia proceeded to the next round to face Italy. On 26 June, Australia met Italy in Kaiserslautern. Kewell was unavailable for the game, entering the stadium on crutches reportedly suffering from an attack of gout and infected blisters (later diagnosed as septic arthritis). The score at half-time was 0–0. Italy went down to 10 men due to the red card (51') given to Marco Materazzi for a two-footed tackle on Mark Bresciano. Otherwise, six yellow cards were issued in total. Almost three minutes into stoppage time, with the score still at 0–0 and Australia being pushed into their own half, a controversial penalty was awarded to Italy when Fabio Grosso fell under a Lucas Neill challenge in the final seconds of the match. Francesco Totti scored from the spot (95') and the game ended immediately with Australia eliminated. Coach Guus Hiddink officially ended his reign as the coach of the Socceroos following the 1–0 loss to Italy and took the managerial job with Russia. Australian assistant coach Graham Arnold branded the penalty a "joke", to the agreement of several Australian players, including Tim Cahill, who believed Grosso should have been cautioned for diving.

=== 2010: New Zealand's outstanding performance ===
This was the first OFC World Cup qualifying campaign since Australia's move from the OFC to the AFC. The first phase began at the 2007 Pacific Games in Samoa, with the football tournament doubling as an OFC World Cup qualifying competition. The gold, silver, and bronze medallists (New Caledonia, Fiji, and Vanuatu, respectively) advanced to the second phase. The three medallists joined seeded side New Zealand in a home-and-away round-robin tournament on FIFA match dates in 2007 and 2008, and also acted as the 2008 OFC Nations Cup. The Cup was won by New Zealand, who as a result qualified for the 2009 FIFA Confederations Cup in South Africa and the World Cup qualifying play-off with the AFC 5th-placed team, Bahrain. New Zealand were successful in this play-off, winning 1–0 on aggregate score in order to qualify for the FIFA World Cup for the first time since the 1982 tournament.

The New Zealand group consisted of reigning World Cup holders Italy, Paraguay, and Slovakia. Winston Reid's header from a Shane Smeltz cross in stoppage time brought New Zealand, 78th in the Fifa rankings, their first ever point at the finals of the tournament against Slovakia (1–1). In the second game New Zealand tied 1–1 with the defending World Cup champions, Italy. Shane Smeltz gave the All Whites the lead in the seventh minute; he had run into an offside position on a free kick, but the referee ruled that he had been played on by an Italian's touch as the ball soared into the penalty area. Italy tied the score with Vincenzo Iaquinta’s penalty kick in the 29th minute. Daniele De Rossi had drawn the penalty when he went down after New Zealand defender Tommy Smith grabbed his shirt, and the goal seem to infuse the Italians with a little life. New Zealand, playing five men across the back in front of goalkeeper Mark Paston, held firm and posted its second straight 1–1 draw. At the start of the third match, against Paraguay, New Zealand had the chance of reaching the last 16 but failed to trouble Paraguay goalkeeper Justo Villar even once in the match, which ended 0–0. New Zealand ended the tournament as the only undefeated team after drawing their three group matches, but they finished behind Paraguay and Slovakia and were eliminated. The team finished 22nd out of the 32 teams.

=== 2014–22: Yet another absence from the World Cup ===
While Australia qualified for the 2014 FIFA World Cup in Brazil, the 2018 FIFA World Cup in Russia and the 2022 FIFA World Cup in Qatar, OFC itself was unable to qualify a team.

For the 2014 tournament, the 2012 OFC Nations Cup served as the second phase of qualifying, and involved the four teams that would compete for the intercontinental play-off with CONCACAF. For the first time a team other than Australia and New Zealand won the continental cup, as the All Whites were upset by New Caledonia, which in turn lost to Tahiti in the final. The French Polynesian squad competed in the 2013 FIFA Confederations Cup, but New Zealand still managed to win the double round-robin group for the World Cup spot. In the playoff, the All-Whites were doubly defeated by Mexico, who finished with an aggregate score of 9–3 to get the World Cup spot.

For 2018, the 2016 edition of the OFC Nations Cup again doubled as the second round of the OFC qualifying competition for the 2018 FIFA World Cup. Samoa won a close first-round group involving four teams, and qualified for a second round stage consisting of two four-team groups and also serving as the 2016 OFC Nations Cup (in that tournament, the top two teams in each group met in knock-out semi finals and final, with New Zealand beating Papua New Guinea on penalties after a goalless stalemate in the final). The top three teams in each of the groups qualified for the third round, from which group winners New Zealand and the Solomon Islands qualified for the final. New Zealand won the two-legged final 8–3 on aggregate after a heavy win at home and a 2–2 draw in Honiara. From here, New Zealand faced a home-and-away knockout match with fifth-placed CONMEBOL team, Peru, who had a FIFA ranking more than 100 places higher than New Zealand (10th vs 122nd). Despite this, New Zealand managed a creditable 0–0 draw at home in Wellington in November 2017, before finally succumbing to a 2–0 loss in Lima several days later.

In 2022, the qualifying format changed, in response to the COVID-19 pandemic and as a result of the pandemic in Oceania, the qualification process was held entirely in Doha, Qatar. Before qualification began, FIFA reported that both American Samoa and Samoa had withdrawn. The preliminary qualification match between the two lowest-ranked teams (Tonga and the Cook Islands) was to determine the eighth team to compete in the second stage. The match was cancelled after Tonga withdrew due to the effects of the 2022 Hunga Tonga–Hunga Ha'apai eruption and tsunami, meaning that the Cook Islands advanced to the group stage. In the second round, two groups consisting of four teams each played each other, with the winners and runner-ups of each group progressing to the final stage. From Group A, Solomon Islands and Tahiti advanced to the next stage as Vanuatu and the Cook Islands withdrew due to COVID-19 cases in both of their camps whilst from Group B, New Zealand and Papua New Guinea advanced as winners and runners-up respectively. The final round was a series of single-legged knock-out matches. Solomon Islands defeated Papua New Guinea 3–2 whilst New Zealand defeated Tahiti 1–0 in their respective semi-final bouts. In the final, New Zealand thrashed Solomon Islands 5–0 and advanced to the inter-confederation play-off. In the single-legged play-off match, contested at neutral Al Rayyan, New Zealand lost 1–0 to Costa Rica.

=== 2026: Direct qualification to the World Cup ===
Due to the 2026 FIFA World Cup being expanded to 48 teams, Oceanic federations were awarded a guaranteed berth for the first time. The qualifying format was slightly altered from the one used in 2022. The first round saw the four lowest-ranked teams at the time (Cook Islands, American Samoa, Samoa, and Tonga) play each other in a single-legged knockout series. The winner, Samoa, joined the other seven teams in the confederation in the second round, where they played in a single round-robin stage composed of two groups of four. The top two from each group (New Caledonia and Fiji from Group A, and New Zealand and Tahiti from Group B) advanced to the final round, a single-legged knockout stage, where New Zealand triumphed over New Caledonia 3–0 in the final to qualify for the World Cup finals for the first time in sixteen years. By virtue of finishing as runner-ups, New Caledonia advanced to the expanded inter-confederation play-offs, where they lost the semi-final of Pathway 1 to Jamaica 1–0.

At the finals, New Zealand were drawn in a group with Belgium, Egypt and Iran. They drew their opener with Iran 2–2, with Elijah Just scoring a brace. In their next game against Egypt, they led heading into half-time courtesy of a header following a 15th minute header by Finn Surman, before conceding three in the second half to lose 3–1. The All Whites' last game saw them succumb to eventual group winners Belgium 5–1, with the solitary goal coming from a Just strike. New Zealand finished fourth in the group, being eliminated as a result.
