= FIFA World Cup qualifiers =

Selection process for World Cup competition

- Founded: 1933; 93 years ago
- Region: International (FIFA)
- Teams: 211 (currently eligible); 215 (overall)
- Website: Official website
- 2026 FIFA World Cup qualification

The FIFA World Cup qualification is a set of competitive matches that a national association football team plays in order to qualify for one of the available berths at the final tournament of the men's FIFA World Cup.

Qualifying tournaments are held within the six FIFA continental zones, each organized by their respective confederations: AFC (Asia), CAF (Africa), CONCACAF (North and Central America and the Caribbean), CONMEBOL (South America), OFC (Oceania), and UEFA (Europe). For each World Cup, FIFA decides the number of places in the finals allocated to each of the zones, based on the numbers and relative strengths of the confederations' teams.

As a courtesy, the host receives an automatic berth selection, as has happened with the immediate past tournament winner during much of the competition's history. All other finalists are determined on a standalone qualifying round achievement without regard to previous achievements.

== History ==
The berths for the inaugural 1930 tournament were filled by invitation only. The 1934 one was the first one to have an actual qualifying phase. The first ever World Cup qualifying match was played on 11 June 1933, when Sweden defeated Estonia 6–2 in Stockholm, and the first goal was scored 7 minutes into the game, with some sources attributing it to Swedish captain Knut Kroon while others credit it as an own goal by the Estonian goalkeeper Evald Tipner.

The number of teams entering qualification stages has increased steadily, and in response the final tournament has also been expanded (having 16 teams until 1978, then 24 between 1982 and 1994, then 32 between 1998 and 2022, and finally 48 from 2026 onwards). While the format of the qualifying tournaments has evolved, teams have always been grouped into zones which have remained relatively unchanged and roughly correspond to the continents. The teams from each zone compete for a fixed number of berths for the zone, with a limited number of places being awarded to winners of intercontinental play-offs.

=== Qualification berths by continent ===
The table below lists the numbers of berths allocated by FIFA for each continent in each tournament. It also shows the total number of teams that entered and played in every qualification cycle.

In the table, "H" denotes an automatic spot for the host, "C" denotes an automatic spot for the defending champion, and "inv" indicates the number of teams that were invited in 1930. Places in intercontinental play-offs are represented as fractions, as follows:

- 0.5 – a place in a direct play-off
- 0.25 – a place in a semi-final play-off (where the winner would then face yet another team for a spot in the finals)
- 1/3 – a place in a play-off tournament where two out of six teams would qualify

Places allocated for continents
	(Uruguay) 1930 (Note: Berths were given by invitation only.)	(Italy) 1934	(France) 1938	(Brazil) 1950	(Switzerland) 1954	(Sweden) 1958	(Chile) 1962	(England) 1966	(Mexico) 1970	(West Germany) 1974	(Argentina) 1978	(Spain) 1982	(Mexico) 1986	(Italy) 1990	(United States) 1994
Europe	4 inv	12	11 +H+C	7 +C	11 +H	9 (Note: Actually the berths were taken by 10 European teams and no African or Asian ones. After Israel won the African/Asian zone without playing due to withdrawals of other teams, a special play-off was arranged between them and a European team, Wales, and was won by the latter.) +H+C	8+ 2×0.5	9 +H	8 +C	8.5 +H	8.5 +C	13 +H	12.5 +C	13 +H	12 +C
Africa	—	1	11 +H+C	0 (Note: None entered.)	11 +H	1	0.5	1	1	1	1	2	2	2	3
Asia	—	1	1	1	1	1	0.5	1	1	1	1	2	2	2	2
Oceania	—N/a (Note: No teams from the region were members of FIFA before 1950.)			0	0	0	0	1	1	1	1	2	0.5	0.5	0.25
North and Central America and Caribbean	2 inv	1	1	2	1	1	0.5	1	1 +H	1	1	2	1 +H	2	1.25 +H
South America	H+ 6 inv	2	1	4 +H	1 +C	3	3.5 +H+C	3 +C	3	2.5 +C	2.5 +H	3 +C	4	2.5 +C	3.5
Total berths	13	16	16		16							24			
Teams in the finals	13	16	15 (Note: Austria withdrew after having qualified.)	13 (Note: India, Scotland and Turkey withdrew after having qualified. France initially accepted to participate as a replacement but then withdrew as well.)	16							24			
Entered qualification (Note: Includes all teams that entered qualification, even if they withdrew or were excluded afterwards or qualified by walkover. Does not include pre-determined automatic qualifiers.)	—N/a	32	34	32	37	51	54	69	69	97	105	107	119	111	145
Played in qualification (Note: Only includes teams that played at least one qualifying match that was not annulled.)	—N/a	27	21	19	33	46	49	51	68	90	95	103	110	103	128
Qualified via qualification	—N/a	14	10	9	13	14	14	14	14	14	14	22	22	22	22
Qualified without playing	13	2	6	7	3	2	2	2	2	2	2	2	2	2	2

	(France) 1998	(South Korea) (Japan) 2002	(Germany) 2006	(South Africa) 2010	(Brazil) 2014	(Russia) 2018	(Qatar) 2022	(Canada) (Mexico) (United States) 2026	(Morocco) (Portugal) (Spain) 2030	(Saudi Arabia) 2034
Europe	14 +H	13.5 +C	13 +H	13	13	13 +H	13	16	2H	
Africa	5	5	5	5 +H	5	5	5	9 1/3	H	
Asia	3.5	2.5 +2H	4.5	4.5	4.5	4.5	4.5 +H	8 1/3		H
Oceania	0.5	0.5	0.5	0.5	0.5	0.5	0.5	1 1/3		
North and Central America and Caribbean	3	3	3.5	3.5	3.5	3.5	3.5	3 2/3 +3H		
South America	4 +C	4.5	4.5	4.5	4.5 +H	4.5	4.5	6 1/3	3H	
Total berths	32							48	48 or 64	
Teams in the finals	32							48	48 or 64	
Entered qualification	172	196	197	205 (Note: Including host South Africa and non-FIFA member Tuvalu, which participated because other tournaments also served as World Cup qualifiers.)	203	210	211 (Note: Including host Qatar, which participated because another tournament also served as World Cup qualifiers.)	207		
Played in qualification	168	193	194	199	202	208	204	206		
Qualified via qualification	30	29	31	31	31	31	31	45	42 / 58	47 / 63
Qualified without playing	2	3	1	1	1	1	1	3	6	1

=== First appearance in qualification by team ===
Only teams that played at least one match are considered for first appearance. Teams that withdrew before the qualification, or that qualified to the World Cup by walkover due to other teams' withdrawals, are not considered.

Year	Debuting teams								Successor and renamed teams
Year	Europe	South America	North, Central America and Caribbean	Asia	Africa	Oceania	T	CT	Successor and renamed teams
1930	No qualification was held all the teams were invitees.								
1934	Austria; Belgium (Note: Participated in the 1930 World Cup by invitation.); Bulgaria; Czechoslovakia (Note: The Czechoslovakia team was officially renamed as the Representation of Czechs and Slovaks during the 1994 qualification and was then succeeded by both the Czech Republic and Slovakia from the 1998 qualification.); Estonia; France; Germany (Note: Germany was succeeded from the 1954 qualification by West Germany, which in turn was succeeded by the reunified Germany from the 1994 qualification.); Greece; Hungary; Irish Free State (Note: The Irish Free State was succeeded in the 1950 qualification by Ireland, which became officially known as the Republic of Ireland from the 1954 qualification.); Italy (Note: Italy had to qualify for the 1934 tournament despite being the host.); Lithuania; Luxembourg; Netherlands; Poland; Portugal; Romania; Spain; Sweden; Switzerland; Yugoslavia (Note: Yugoslavia was succeeded from the 1998 qualification by FR Yugoslavia, which was renamed as Serbia and Montenegro for the 2006 qualification and was then succeeded by Serbia from the 2010 qualification.)	none	Cuba; Haiti; Mexico; United States	Mandatory Palestine (Note: Mandatory Palestine was succeeded by Israel from the 1950 qualification.)	Egypt (Note: Egypt was later succeeded by the United Arab Republic, a political union with Syria, which entered the 1962 qualification, but withdrew before playing. Then Egypt continued independently but retained the name "United Arab Republic", under which it entered the 1966 qualification and also withdrew before playing. It was renamed back as "Egypt" from the 1974 qualification.)	none	27	27	
1938	Finland Latvia; Norway	none	none	none	none	none	3	30	
1950	England; Ireland (Note: Ireland was succeeded by Northern Ireland from the 1954 qualification.); Scotland; Turkey (Note: Withdrew from the 1934 qualification before playing.); Wales	none	none	Syria	none	none	6	36	Ireland; Israel
1954	Saar	Brazil (Note: Participated in the 1930 World Cup by invitation. Qualified by walkover for the 1934 and 1938 finals. Qualified automatically for the 1950 World Cup as host.); Chile (Note: Participated in the 1930 World Cup by invitation. Withdrew from the 1934 qualification before playing. Qualified by walkover for the 1950 finals.); Paraguay (Note: Participated in the 1930 World Cup by invitation. Qualified by walkover for the 1950 finals.)	none	Japan (Note: Withdrew from the 1938 qualification before playing.); South Korea	none	none	6	42	Northern Ireland; Republic of Ireland; West Germany
1958	Denmark; East Germany; Iceland; Soviet Union (Note: The Soviet Union was succeeded by Russia from the 1994 qualification.)	Argentina (Note: Participated in the 1930 World Cup by invitation. Qualified by walkover for the 1934 finals. Withdrew from the 1938 and 1950 qualifications before playing.); Bolivia; Colombia; Peru (Note: Participated in the 1930 World Cup by invitation. Withdrew from the 1934, 1950, and 1954 qualifications before playing.); Uruguay (Note: Participated in the 1930 World Cup as host. Qualified by walkover for the 1950 finals. Qualified automatically for the 1954 finals as defending champion.)	Canada; Costa Rica; Guatemala; Territory of Curaçao (Note: The Territory of Curaçao was succeeded from the 1962 qualification by the Netherlands Antilles, which in turn was succeeded by Curaçao from the 2014 qualification.)	China; Indonesia (Note: Qualified by walkover for the 1938 finals (entered as the Dutch East Indies). Withdrew from the 1950 qualification before playing.)	Sudan	none	16	58	
1962	Cyprus (Note: Withdrew from the 1958 qualification before playing.)	Ecuador (Note: Withdrew from the 1950 qualification before playing.)	Dutch Guiana (Note: Dutch Guiana was succeeded by Suriname from the 1978 qualification.); Honduras	none	Ethiopia; Ghana; Morocco; Nigeria; Tunisia	none	9	67	Netherlands Antilles
1966	Albania	Venezuela	Jamaica; Trinidad and Tobago	North Korea	none	Australia	6	73	
1970	none	none	Bermuda; El Salvador	none	Algeria (Note: Withdrew from the 1966 qualification before playing.); Cameroon; Libya; Rhodesia (Note: Rhodesia was succeeded by Zimbabwe from the 1982 qualification.); Senegal; Zambia	New Zealand	9	82	
1974	Malta	none	Antigua and Barbuda; Puerto Rico	Hong Kong; Iran; Iraq; Kuwait; Malaysia; South Vietnam (Note: South Vietnam was succeeded by Vietnam from the 1994 qualification.); Thailand	Congo; Dahomey (Note: Dahomey was renamed as Benin from the 1986 qualification.); Guinea; Ivory Coast; Kenya; Lesotho; Mauritius; Sierra Leone; Tanzania; Togo; Zaire (Note: Zaire was renamed as DR Congo during the 1998 qualification.)	none	21	103	
1978	none	none	Barbados; Dominican Republic; Guyana; Panama	Bahrain; Qatar; Taiwan (Note: Withdrew from the 1954 and 1958 qualifications before playing.) (Note: The Republic of China became officially known as Chinese Taipei from the 1982 qualification.); Saudi Arabia; Singapore	Malawi; Mauritania; Niger; Uganda; Upper Volta (Note: Upper Volta was renamed as Burkina Faso from the 1990 qualification.)	none	14	117	Suriname
1982	none	none	Grenada	Macau	Gambia; Liberia; Madagascar (Note: Withdrew from the 1974 qualification before playing (entered as the Malagasy Republic).); Mozambique; Somalia	Fiji	8	125	Chinese Taipei; Zimbabwe
1986	none	none	none	Bangladesh; Brunei; Jordan; India (Note: Qualified by walkover for the 1950 finals, and subsequently withdrew from participation. Withdrew from the 1974 qualification before playing.); Nepal; North Yemen (Note: North Yemen was succeeded by Yemen from the 1994 qualification.); South Yemen; United Arab Emirates (Note: Withdrew from the 1978 qualification before playing.)	Angola	none	9	134	Benin
1990	none	none	none	Oman (Note: Withdrew from the 1986 qualification before playing.); Pakistan	Gabon (Note: Withdrew from the 1966 and 1974 qualifications before playing.)	none	3	137	Burkina Faso
1994	Faroe Islands; San Marino	none	Nicaragua; Saint Lucia; Saint Vincent and the Grenadines	Lebanon (Note: Withdrew during the 1986 qualification and had all its matches of that campaign annulled.); Sri Lanka (Note: Withdrew from the 1974 and 1978 qualifications before playing (entered in 1974 as Ceylon).)	Botswana; Burundi; Namibia; South Africa; Swaziland (Note: Swaziland was renamed as Eswatini from the 2022 qualification.)	Solomon Islands; Tahiti; Vanuatu	15	152	Germany; Representation of Czechs and Slovaks; Russia; Vietnam; Yemen
1998	Armenia; Azerbaijan; Belarus; Bosnia and Herzegovina; Croatia; Georgia; Liechtenstein (Note: Withdrew from the 1994 qualification before playing.); Macedonia (Note: Macedonia was renamed as North Macedonia from the 2022 qualification.); Moldova; Slovenia; Ukraine	none	Aruba; Belize; Cayman Islands; Dominica; Saint Kitts and Nevis	Cambodia; Kazakhstan; Kyrgyzstan; Maldives (Note: Withdrew from the 1990 qualification before playing.); Philippines (Note: Withdrew from the 1950 and 1974 qualifications before playing.); Tajikistan; Turkmenistan; Uzbekistan	Guinea-Bissau; Rwanda	Cook Islands; Papua New Guinea; Tonga; Western Samoa (Note: Western Samoa was renamed as Samoa from the 2002 qualification.)	31	183	Czech Republic; Slovakia; DR Congo; FR Yugoslavia
2002	Andorra	none	Anguilla; Bahamas (Note: Withdrew from the 1998 qualification before playing.); British Virgin Islands; Montserrat; Turks and Caicos Islands; U.S. Virgin Islands	Guam; Laos; Mongolia; Palestine	Cape Verde; Central African Republic (Note: Withdrew from the 1978 qualification before playing. Was disqualified from the 1982 qualification before playing.); Chad; Djibouti; Equatorial Guinea; Eritrea; Mali (Note: Withdrew from the 1966, 1994 and 1998 qualifications before playing.); São Tomé and Príncipe; Seychelles	American Samoa	21	204	Samoa
2006	none	none	none	Afghanistan	none	New Caledonia	2	206	Serbia and Montenegro
2010	Montenegro	none	none	Timor-Leste; Myanmar (Note: Withdrew from the 1950, 1994, and 2002 qualifications before playing (entered in 1950 as Burma).)	Comoros	Tuvalu (Note: Tuvalu, a non-FIFA member, formally could not enter the 2010 World Cup, but the team participated in the 2007 South Pacific Games which doubled as a stage of the qualification for that World Cup, and the team's results did count in determining advancement from that stage.) Kiribati	5	211	Serbia
2014	none	none	none	none	none	none	0	211	Curaçao
2018	Gibraltar; Kosovo	none	none	Bhutan (Note: Withdrew from the 2010 qualification before playing.)	South Sudan	none	4	215	
2022	none	none	none	none	none	none	0	215	Eswatini; North Macedonia
2026	none	none	none	none	none	none	0	215	

Teams' entries before their actual debuts in qualification

Successor and renamed teams

Other notes

=== Overview of teams' participations ===
The below table shows how every team has participated in each World Cup qualification.

Key

- golden background = successful qualifying campaign
- grey background = did not take part in qualifying
- bold red typeface = participated in the final tournament

Q	Qualified
w	Qualified, then withdrew from the finals (Austria in 1938, and Scotland and Turkey in 1950)
n	Did not qualify
w	Withdrew during qualifying
d	Was disqualified during qualifying
H	Qualified automatically as host but took part in qualifiers as they doubled as another tournament (South Africa in 2010 and Qatar in 2022)
\	Was not a FIFA member but took part in qualifiers as they doubled as another tournament (Tuvalu in 2010)
H	Qualified automatically as host
C	Qualified automatically as reigning champion
i	Was invited to the finals (all finalists in 1930 except Uruguay)
b	Received bye to the finals
B	Received bye to the finals, then withdrew (India in 1950)
w	Entered but withdrew before playing, or withdrew during qualifying and had all matches annulled
d	Entered but was disqualified before playing, or was disqualified during qualifying and had all matches annulled
s	Was suspended from entering, or had entry rejected
—	Did not enter despite being a FIFA member
	Was not a FIFA member

Team	19 30	19 34	19 38	19 50	19 54	19 58	19 62	19 66	19 70	19 74	19 78	19 82	19 86	19 90	19 94	19 98	20 02	20 06	20 10	20 14	20 18	20 22	20 26	20 30	20 34	Current confederation (Note: Africa and Asia had a joint zone in 1934 and 1958. Africa, Asia and Oceania had a joint zone in 1966. Asia and Oceania had a joint zone in 1970–1982.)
Afghanistan				—	—	—	—	—	—	—	—	—	—	—	—	—	—	n	n	n	n	n	n			AFC
Albania		—	—	—	—	—	—	n	s	n	—	n	n	n	n	n	n	n	n	n	n	n	n			UEFA
Algeria								w	n	n	n	Q	Q	n	n	n	n	n	Q	Q	n	n	Q			CAF
American Samoa																	n	n	n	n	n	w	n			OFC
Andorra																	n	n	n	n	n	n	n			UEFA
Angola													n	n	n	n	n	Q	n	n	n	n	n			CAF
Anguilla																	n	n	n	n	n	n	n			CONCACAF
Antigua and Barbuda										n	—	—	n	n	n	n	n	n	n	n	n	n	n			CONCACAF
Argentina	i	b	w	w	—	Q	Q	Q	n	Q	H	C	Q	C	Q	Q	Q	Q	Q	Q	Q	Q	Q	H		CONMEBOL
Armenia																n	n	n	n	n	n	n	n			UEFA
Aruba															—	n	n	n	n	n	n	n	n			CONCACAF
Australia								n	n	Q	n	n	n	n	n	n	n	Q	Q	Q	Q	Q	Q			AFC (Note: Entered the Oceanian zone in 1986–2006.)
Austria	—	Q	w	w	Q	Q	—	n	n	n	Q	Q	n	Q	n	Q	n	n	n	n	n	n	Q			UEFA
Azerbaijan																n	n	n	n	n	n	n	n			UEFA
Bahamas									—	—	—	—	—	—	—	w	n	n	n	w	n	n	n			CONCACAF
Bahrain									—	—	n	n	n	w	n	n	n	n	n	n	n	n	n			AFC
Bangladesh											—	—	n	n	n	n	n	n	n	n	n	n	n			AFC
Barbados									—	—	n	—	w	—	n	n	n	n	n	n	d	n	n			CONCACAF
Belarus																n	n	n	n	n	n	n	n			UEFA
Belgium	i	Q	Q	w	Q	n	n	n	Q	n	n	Q	Q	Q	Q	Q	Q	n	n	Q	Q	Q	Q			UEFA
Belize														s	—	n	n	n	n	n	n	n	n			CONCACAF
Benin (1978–); Dahomey (1970–1974)									—	n	—	—	n	—	n	—	n	n	n	n	n	n	n			CAF
Bermuda								—	n	—	—	—	—	—	n	w	n	n	n	n	n	n	n			CONCACAF
Bhutan																	—	—	w	—	n	n	n			AFC
Bolivia	i	—	—	b	s	n	n	n	n	n	n	n	n	n	Q	n	n	n	n	n	n	n	n			CONMEBOL
Bosnia and Herzegovina																n	n	n	n	Q	n	n	Q			UEFA
Botswana												—	—	—	n	—	n	n	n	n	n	n	n			CAF
Brazil	i	b	b	H	Q	Q	C	C	Q	C	Q	Q	Q	Q	Q	C	Q	Q	Q	H	Q	Q	Q			CONMEBOL
British Virgin Islands																	n	n	n	n	n	n	n			CONCACAF
Brunei										—	—	—	n	—	—	—	n	—	—	s	n	n	n			AFC
Bulgaria	—	w	n	—	n	n	Q	Q	Q	Q	n	n	Q	n	Q	Q	n	n	n	n	n	n	n			UEFA
Burkina Faso (1986–); Upper Volta (1970–1982)									—	—	n	—	—	n	w	n	n	n	n	n	n	n	n			CAF
Burundi											—	—	—	—	n	w	w	n	n	n	n	n	n			CAF
Cambodia (Note: Known as the Khmer Republic in 1974, and then as Kampuchea until 1990.)						—	—	—	—	—	—	—	—	—	—	n	n	—	n	n	n	n	n			AFC
Cameroon								w	n	n	n	Q	n	Q	Q	Q	Q	n	Q	Q	n	Q	n			CAF
Canada				—	—	n	w	—	n	n	n	n	Q	n	n	n	n	n	n	n	n	Q	H			CONCACAF
Cape Verde														—	—	—	n	n	n	n	n	n	Q			CAF
Cayman Islands																n	n	n	n	n	n	n	n			CONCACAF
Central African Republic								—	—	—	w	d	—	—	—	—	n	w	w	n	n	n	n			CAF
Chad								—	—	—	—	—	—	—	—	—	n	n	n	n	n	n	n			CAF
Chile	i	w	—	b	n	n	H	Q	n	Q	n	Q	n	n	s	Q	n	n	Q	Q	n	n	n			CONMEBOL
China		—	—	—	—	n	—	—	—	—	—	n	n	n	n	n	Q	n	n	n	n	n	n			AFC
Chinese Taipei (1982–); Taiwan (1954–1978)					w	w	—	—	—	—	n	n	n	n	n	n	n	n	n	n	n	n	n			AFC (Note: Entered the Oceanian zone in 1986–1990.)
Colombia			w	—	—	n	Q	n	n	n	n	n	n	Q	Q	Q	n	n	n	Q	Q	n	Q			CONMEBOL (Note: Entered the North and Central American zone in 1938.)
Comoros																			n	n	n	n	n			CAF
Congo								s	—	n	n	—	—	—	n	n	n	n	n	n	n	n	n			CAF
Cook Islands																n	n	n	n	n	n	w	n			OFC
Costa Rica	—	—	w	—	s	n	n	n	n	n	n	n	n	Q	n	n	Q	Q	n	Q	Q	Q	n			CONCACAF
Croatia																Q	Q	Q	n	Q	Q	Q	Q			UEFA
Cuba		n	b	n	s	—	—	n	s	—	n	n	—	n	w	n	n	n	n	n	n	n	n			CONCACAF
Curaçao (2014–); Netherlands Antilles (1962–2010); Territory of Curaçao (1934–1958)		—	—	—	—	n	n	n	n	n	n	n	n	n	n	n	n	n	n	n	n	n	Q			CONCACAF
Cyprus						w	n	n	n	n	n	n	n	n	n	n	n	n	n	n	n	n	n			UEFA (Note: Entered the African/Asian zone in 1958.)
Czech Republic (1998–); Representation of Czechs and Slovaks (1994); Czechoslovakia (1930–1994)	—	Q	Q	—	Q	Q	Q	n	Q	n	n	Q	n	Q	n	n	n	Q	n	n	n	n	Q			UEFA
Denmark	—	—	—	—	—	n	—	n	n	n	n	n	Q	n	n	Q	Q	n	Q	n	Q	Q	n			UEFA
Djibouti																—	n	—	n	n	n	n	n			CAF
Dominica																n	n	n	n	n	n	n	n			CONCACAF
Dominican Republic						—	—	—	—	—	n	—	—	—	n	n	n	n	n	n	n	n	n			CONCACAF
DR Congo (1998–); Zaire (1974–1998) (Note: Known as Congo-Kinshasa until 1970.)								—	s	Q	w	n	—	n	n	n	n	n	n	n	n	n	Q			CAF
East Germany					—	n	n	n	n	Q	n	n	n	n												defunct (Note: Participated in the European zone.)
Timor-Leste																			n	n	n	n	n			AFC
Ecuador	—	—	—	w	—	—	n	n	n	n	n	n	n	n	n	n	Q	Q	n	Q	n	Q	Q			CONMEBOL
Egypt (Note: Entered in 1962 as the United Arab Republic representing a political union with Syria. After that continued independently but retained the name "United Arab Republic" until 1970.)	—	Q	w	—	n	w	w	w	—	n	n	n	n	Q	n	n	n	n	n	n	Q	n	Q			CAF (Note: Entered the European zone in 1938 and 1954.)
El Salvador			w	—	—	—	—	—	Q	n	n	Q	n	n	n	n	n	n	n	n	n	n	n			CONCACAF
England				Q	Q	Q	Q	H	C	n	n	Q	Q	Q	n	Q	Q	Q	Q	Q	Q	Q	Q			UEFA
Equatorial Guinea														—	—	—	n	n	n	n	n	n	n			CAF
Eritrea																	n	n	w	n	n	n	w			CAF
Estonia	—	n	n												n	n	n	n	n	n	n	n	n			UEFA
Eswatini (2022–); Swaziland (1982–2018)												—	—	—	n	n	n	n	n	n	n	n	n			CAF
Ethiopia					—	s	n	w	n	n	n	n	n	—	n	—	n	n	d	n	n	n	n			CAF (Note: Entered the European zone in 1962.)
Faroe Islands															n	n	n	n	n	n	n	n	n			UEFA
Fiji								—	—	—	—	n	—	n	n	n	n	n	n	n	n	n	n			OFC
Finland	—	—	n	w	n	n	n	n	n	n	n	n	n	n	n	n	n	n	n	n	n	n	n			UEFA
France	i	Q	H	n	Q	Q	n	Q	n	n	Q	Q	Q	n	n	H	C	Q	Q	Q	Q	Q	Q			UEFA
Gabon								w	—	w	—	—	—	n	n	n	n	n	n	n	n	n	n			CAF
Gambia									—	—	—	n	n	—	w	n	n	n	n	n	n	n	n			CAF
Georgia																n	n	n	n	n	n	n	n			UEFA
Germany (1994–); West Germany (1950–1990); Germany (1930–1938)	—	Q	Q	s	Q	C	Q	Q	Q	H	C	Q	Q	Q	C	Q	Q	H	Q	Q	Q	Q	Q			UEFA
Ghana							n	w	n	n	n	w	n	n	n	n	n	Q	Q	Q	n	Q	Q			CAF
Gibraltar																					n	n	n			UEFA
Greece	—	w	n	—	n	n	n	n	n	n	n	n	n	n	Q	n	n	n	Q	Q	n	n	n			UEFA
Grenada												n	w	—	—	n	n	n	n	n	n	n	n			CONCACAF
Guam																—	n	w	w	—	n	n	n			AFC
Guatemala				—	—	n	n	s	n	n	n	n	n	n	n	n	n	n	n	n	n	n	n			CONCACAF
Guinea								w	s	n	n	n	n	n	n	n	d	n	n	n	n	n	n			CAF
Guinea-Bissau														—	—	n	n	n	n	n	n	n	n			CAF
Guyana										—	n	n	n	n	n	n	d	n	n	n	n	n	n			CONCACAF
Haiti		n	—	—	n	—	—	—	n	Q	n	n	n	—	n	n	n	n	n	n	n	n	Q			CONCACAF
Honduras				—	—	—	n	n	n	n	w	Q	n	n	n	n	n	n	Q	Q	n	n	n			CONCACAF
Hong Kong						—	—	—	—	n	n	n	n	n	n	n	n	n	n	n	n	n	n			AFC
Hungary	—	Q	Q	—	b	Q	Q	Q	n	n	Q	Q	Q	n	n	n	n	n	n	n	n	n	n			UEFA
Iceland				—	s	n	—	—	—	n	n	n	n	n	n	n	n	n	n	n	Q	n	n			UEFA
India				B	s	—	—	—	—	w	—	—	n	w	n	n	n	n	n	n	n	n	n			AFC
Indonesia (Note: Entered as the Dutch East Indies in 1938.)			b	w	—	w	w	—	—	n	n	n	n	n	n	n	n	n	n	n	d	n	n			AFC
Iran				—	—	—	—	—	—	n	Q	w	d	n	n	Q	n	Q	n	Q	Q	Q	Q			AFC
Iraq					—	—	—	—	—	n	w	n	Q	n	n	n	n	n	n	n	n	n	Q			AFC
Israel (1950–); Mandatory Palestine (1930–1938)	—	n	n	n	n	n	n	n	Q	n	n	n	n	n	n	n	n	n	n	n	n	n	n			UEFA (Note: Entered the African/Asian zone in 1934 and 1958, the Asian/Oceanian zone in 1970–1978, and the Oceanian zone in 1986–1990.)
Italy	—	Q	C	C	Q	n	Q	Q	Q	Q	Q	Q	C	H	Q	Q	Q	Q	Q	Q	n	n	n			UEFA
Ivory Coast								—	—	n	n	—	n	n	n	n	n	Q	Q	Q	n	n	Q			CAF
Jamaica								n	n	w	n	—	d	n	n	Q	n	n	n	n	n	n	n			CONCACAF
Japan	—	—	w	s	n	—	n	—	n	n	n	n	n	n	n	Q	H	Q	Q	Q	Q	Q	Q			AFC
Jordan						—	—	—	—	—	—	—	n	n	n	n	n	n	n	n	n	n	Q			AFC
Kazakhstan																n	n	n	n	n	n	n	n			UEFA (Note: Entered the Asian zone in 1998–2002.)
Kenya							—	—	—	n	n	n	n	n	n	n	n	n	n	n	n	n	n			CAF
Kosovo																					n	n	n			UEFA
Kuwait								—	—	n	n	Q	n	n	n	n	n	n	n	n	d	n	n			AFC
Kyrgyzstan																n	n	n	n	n	n	n	n			AFC
Laos					—	—	—	—	—	—	—	—	—	—	—	—	n	n	—	n	n	n	n			AFC
Latvia	—	—	n												n	n	n	n	n	n	n	n	n			UEFA
Lebanon			—	—	—	—	—	—	—	—	—	—	w	—	n	n	n	n	n	n	n	n	n			AFC
Lesotho								—	—	n	—	n	w	w	—	—	n	n	n	n	n	n	n			CAF
Liberia								w	—	—	—	n	n	n	w	n	n	n	n	n	n	n	n			CAF
Libya								w	n	—	n	w	n	w	d	—	n	n	n	n	n	n	n			CAF
Liechtenstein											—	—	—	—	w	n	n	n	n	n	n	n	n			UEFA
Lithuania	—	n	n												n	n	n	n	n	n	n	n	n			UEFA
Luxembourg	—	n	n	n	n	n	n	n	n	n	n	n	n	n	n	n	n	n	n	n	n	n	n			UEFA
Macau												n	n	—	n	n	n	n	n	n	n	n	n			AFC
Madagascar (Note: Known as the Malagasy Republic until 1974.)								—	—	w	—	n	n	—	n	n	n	n	n	n	n	n	n			CAF
Malawi									—	—	n	n	n	n	w	n	n	n	n	n	n	n	n			CAF
Malaysia (Note: Preceded by Malaya until 1962.)						—	—	—	—	n	n	n	n	n	n	n	n	n	n	n	n	n	n			AFC
Maldives														w	—	n	n	n	n	n	n	n	n			AFC
Mali								w	—	—	—	—	—	—	w	w	n	n	n	n	n	n	n			CAF
Malta							—	—	—	n	n	n	n	n	n	n	n	n	n	n	n	n	n			UEFA
Mauritania										—	n	—	—	—	w	n	n	n	n	—	n	n	n			CAF
Mauritius								—	—	n	—	—	n	s	—	n	n	n	n	w	n	n	n			CAF
Mexico	i	n	w	Q	Q	Q	Q	Q	H	n	Q	n	H	d	Q	Q	Q	Q	Q	Q	Q	Q	H			CONCACAF
Moldova																n	n	n	n	n	n	n	n			UEFA
Mongolia																	n	n	n	n	n	n	n			AFC
Montenegro																			n	n	n	n	n			UEFA
Montserrat																	n	n	n	n	n	n	n			CONCACAF
Morocco							n	w	Q	w	n	n	Q	n	Q	Q	n	n	n	n	Q	Q	Q	H		CAF
Mozambique												n	—	s	n	n	n	n	n	n	n	n	n			CAF
Myanmar (Note: Known as Burma until 1990.)				w	—	—	—	—	—	—	—	—	—	—	w	—	w	s	n	n	n	n	n			AFC
Namibia															n	n	n	n	n	n	n	n	n			CAF
Nepal										—	—	—	n	n	—	n	n	w	n	n	n	n	n			AFC
Netherlands	—	Q	Q	—	—	n	n	n	n	Q	Q	n	n	Q	Q	Q	n	Q	Q	Q	n	Q	Q			UEFA
New Caledonia																		n	n	n	n	n	n			OFC
New Zealand				—	—	—	—	—	n	n	n	Q	n	n	n	n	n	n	Q	n	n	n	Q			OFC
Nicaragua					—	—	—	—	—	—	—	—	—	—	n	n	n	n	n	n	n	n	n			CONCACAF
Niger								—	—	—	n	n	w	—	n	w	—	n	n	n	n	n	n			CAF
Nigeria							n	w	n	n	n	n	n	n	Q	Q	Q	n	Q	Q	Q	n	n			CAF
North Korea							—	Q	d	n	w	n	n	n	n	—	—	n	Q	n	n	w	n			AFC
North Macedonia (2022–); Macedonia (1998–2018)																n	n	n	n	n	n	n	n			UEFA
Northern Ireland (1954–); Ireland (1950)				n	n	Q	n	n	n	n	n	Q	Q	n	n	n	n	n	n	n	n	n	n			UEFA
Norway	—	—	Q	—	n	n	n	n	n	n	n	n	n	n	Q	Q	n	n	n	n	n	n	Q			UEFA
Oman												—	w	n	n	n	n	n	n	n	n	n	n			AFC
Pakistan				—	—	—	—	—	—	—	—	—	—	n	n	n	n	n	n	n	n	n	n			AFC
Palestine																	n	n	n	n	n	n	n			AFC
Panama				—	—	—	—	—	—	—	n	n	n	n	n	n	n	n	n	n	Q	n	Q			CONCACAF
Papua New Guinea									—	—	—	—	—	—	—	n	—	n	—	n	n	n	n			OFC
Paraguay	i	—	—	b	n	Q	n	n	n	n	n	n	Q	n	n	Q	Q	Q	Q	n	n	n	Q	H		CONMEBOL
Peru	i	w	—	w	w	n	n	n	Q	n	Q	Q	n	n	n	n	n	n	n	n	Q	n	n			CONMEBOL
Philippines		—	—	w	—	—	—	s	—	w	—	—	—	—	—	n	n	—	—	n	n	n	n			AFC
Poland	—	n	Q	—	w	n	n	n	n	Q	Q	Q	Q	n	n	n	Q	Q	n	n	Q	Q	n			UEFA
Portugal	—	n	n	n	n	n	n	Q	n	n	n	n	Q	n	n	n	Q	Q	Q	Q	Q	Q	Q	H		UEFA
Puerto Rico							—	—	—	n	—	—	n	n	n	n	n	—	n	n	n	n	n			CONCACAF
Qatar										—	n	n	n	n	n	n	n	n	n	n	n	H	Q			AFC
Republic of Ireland (1954–); Ireland (1950); Irish Free State (1930–1938)	—	n	n	n	n	n	n	n	n	n	n	n	n	Q	Q	n	Q	n	n	n	n	n	n			UEFA
Romania	i	Q	b	—	n	n	w	n	Q	n	n	n	n	Q	Q	Q	n	n	n	n	n	n	n			UEFA
Russia (1994–); Soviet Union (1950–1990)				—	—	Q	Q	Q	Q	d	n	Q	Q	Q	Q	n	Q	n	n	Q	H	d	s			UEFA
Rwanda												—	—	w	—	n	n	n	n	n	n	n	n			CAF
Saar					n																					defunct
Saint Kitts and Nevis																n	n	n	n	n	n	n	n			CONCACAF
Saint Lucia															n	n	n	n	n	n	n	w	n			CONCACAF
Saint Vincent and the Grenadines															n	n	n	n	n	n	n	n	n			CONCACAF
Samoa (2002–); Western Samoa (1990–1998)														—	w	n	n	n	n	n	n	w	n			OFC
San Marino															n	n	n	n	n	n	n	n	n			UEFA
São Tomé and Príncipe														—	w	—	n	n	w	n	n	n	n			CAF
Saudi Arabia						—	—	—	—	—	n	n	n	n	Q	Q	Q	Q	n	n	Q	Q	Q		H	AFC
Scotland				w	Q	Q	n	n	n	Q	Q	Q	Q	Q	n	Q	n	n	n	n	n	n	Q			UEFA
Senegal								w	n	n	n	n	n	—	n	n	Q	n	n	n	Q	Q	Q			CAF
Serbia (2010–); Serbia and Montenegro (2006); FR Yugoslavia (1994–2002); Yugoslavia (1930–1990)	i	n	n	Q	Q	Q	Q	n	n	Q	n	Q	n	Q	d	Q	n	Q	Q	n	Q	Q	n			UEFA
Seychelles														—	—	—	n	n	n	n	n	n	n			CAF
Sierra Leone							—	—	—	n	n	n	n	—	w	n	n	n	n	n	n	n	n			CAF
Singapore					—	—	—	—	—	—	n	n	n	n	n	n	n	n	n	n	n	n	n			AFC
Slovakia (1998–); Representation of Czechs and Slovaks (1994); Czechoslovakia (1930–1994)	—	Q	Q	—	Q	Q	Q	n	Q	n	n	Q	n	Q	n	n	n	n	Q	n	n	n	n			UEFA
Slovenia																n	Q	n	Q	n	n	n	n			UEFA
Solomon Islands															n	n	n	n	n	n	n	n	n			OFC
Somalia								—	—	—	—	n	—	—	—	—	n	n	n	n	n	n	n			CAF
South Africa							s	d	s	s	s				n	Q	Q	n	H	n	n	n	Q			CAF
South Korea				—	Q	s	n	w	n	n	n	n	Q	Q	Q	Q	H	Q	Q	Q	Q	Q	Q			AFC
South Sudan																					n	n	n			CAF
South Yemen									—	—	—	—	n	w												defunct (Note: Participated in the Asian zone.)
Spain	—	Q	s	Q	n	n	Q	Q	n	n	Q	H	Q	Q	Q	Q	Q	Q	Q	Q	Q	Q	Q	H		UEFA
Sri Lanka (Note: Known as Ceylon until 1974.)					—	—	—	—	—	w	w	—	—	—	n	n	n	n	n	n	n	n	n			AFC
Sudan				—	—	w	w	w	n	n	w	n	n	n	w	n	n	n	n	n	n	n	n			CAF
Suriname (1978–); Dutch Guiana (1930–1974)	—	—	w	—	—	—	n	n	n	n	n	n	n	—	n	n	n	n	n	n	n	n	n			CONCACAF
Sweden	—	Q	Q	Q	n	H	n	n	Q	Q	Q	n	n	Q	Q	n	Q	Q	n	n	Q	n	Q			UEFA
Switzerland	—	Q	Q	Q	H	n	Q	Q	n	n	n	n	n	n	Q	n	n	Q	Q	Q	Q	Q	Q			UEFA
Syria			—	w	—	n		w	—	n	n	n	n	n	n	n	n	n	n	d	n	n	n			AFC (Note: Entered the European zone in 1950 and 1966.)
Tahiti															n	n	n	n	n	n	n	n	n			OFC
Tajikistan																n	n	n	n	n	n	n	n			AFC
Tanzania								—	—	n	w	n	n	—	w	n	n	n	n	n	n	n	n			CAF
Thailand	—	—	—	—	—	—	—	—	—	n	n	n	n	n	n	n	n	n	n	n	n	n	n			AFC
Togo								—	—	n	n	n	w	w	n	n	n	Q	n	n	n	n	n			CAF
Tonga																n	n	n	n	n	n	w	n			OFC
Trinidad and Tobago				—	—	—	—	n	n	n	n	n	n	n	n	n	n	Q	n	n	n	n	n			CONCACAF
Tunisia							n	w	n	n	Q	n	n	n	n	Q	Q	Q	n	n	Q	Q	Q			CAF
Turkey	—	w	—	w	Q	w	n	n	n	n	n	n	n	n	n	n	Q	n	n	n	n	n	Q			UEFA (Note: Entered the African/Asian zone in 1934 and 1958.)
Turkmenistan																n	n	n	n	n	n	n	n			AFC
Turks and Caicos Islands																	n	n	n	n	n	n	n			CONCACAF
Tuvalu																			\							OFC
Uganda							—	—	—	—	n	w	n	n	w	n	n	n	n	n	n	n	n			CAF
Ukraine																n	n	Q	n	n	n	n	n			UEFA
United Arab Emirates											w	—	n	Q	n	n	n	n	n	n	n	n	n			AFC
United States	i	Q	w	Q	n	n	n	n	n	n	n	n	n	Q	H	Q	Q	Q	Q	Q	n	Q	H			CONCACAF
U.S. Virgin Islands																	n	n	n	n	n	n	n			CONCACAF
Uruguay	H	—	—	b	C	n	Q	Q	Q	Q	n	n	Q	Q	n	n	Q	n	Q	Q	Q	Q	Q	H		CONMEBOL
Uzbekistan																n	n	n	n	n	n	n	Q			AFC
Vanuatu															n	n	n	n	n	n	n	w	n			OFC
Venezuela					—	w	—	n	n	w	n	n	n	n	n	n	n	n	n	n	n	n	n			CONMEBOL
Vietnam (1978–); South Vietnam (1954–1974)					s	—	—	—	—	n	w	—	—	—	n	n	n	n	n	n	n	n	n			AFC
Wales				n	n	Q	n	n	n	n	n	n	n	n	n	n	n	n	n	n	n	Q	n			UEFA
Yemen (1994–); North Yemen (1982–1990)												—	n	n	n	n	n	n	n	n	n	n	n			AFC
Zambia								—	n	n	n	n	n	n	n	n	n	n	n	n	n	n	n			CAF
Zimbabwe (1982–); Rhodesia (1970–1978)									n	—	—	n	n	n	n	n	n	n	n	n	d	n	n			CAF (Note: Entered the Asian/Oceanian zone in 1970.)
Team	19 30	19 34	19 38	19 50	19 54	19 58	19 62	19 66	19 70	19 74	19 78	19 82	19 86	19 90	19 94	19 98	20 02	20 06	20 10	20 14	20 18	20 22	20 26	20 30	20 34	Current confederation

Non-participating incarnations

Continental allocations

== Team records ==
The below table compares the overall records of all teams that have participated in qualification. Teams are ordered by points using the three points for a win system, then by goal difference, and then by goals scored. Note that this order does not represent any official rankings, and qualification tournaments are not direct competitions among all teams.

The "Qualifying attempts" column counts qualifying campaigns where the team played at least one match that was not annulled. An attempt is treated as "successful" if the team gained the right to participate in the finals, even if it did not appear there eventually.

As per statistical convention in football, goals scored during extra time are counted towards matches' scorelines and outcomes, while goals scored during penalty shoot-outs are not. Annulled matches are not counted; for matches that were annulled and then replayed, only the replays are counted. For matches where the scorelines were awarded, the awarded scorelines, and not the original ones (if any), are counted.

Ecuador was deducted 3 points in the 2026 qualifying, which is reflected in the table.

Key
Team has qualified for the main tournament through a qualifying process
Team has qualified for the main tournament only by walkover (Cuba, and Indonesia as Dutch East Indies)
Team has qualified for the main tournament by walkover but has not participated there because it withdrew (India)
Team has not qualified for the main tournament
Defunct team that qualified for the main tournament (East Germany)
Defunct team that never qualified for the main tournament (Saar and South Yemen)
Team is not a member of FIFA and is not eligible for the main tournament (Tuvalu)

The table is updated to the matches played in March 2026.

Rank (unoff.)	Team	Qualifying attempts		Appearances in the finals	Overall qualification record							Points		Confederation
Rank (unoff.)	Team	Total	Successful	Appearances in the finals	Pld	W	D	L	GF	GA	GD	Total	Avg	Confederation
1	Mexico	17	14	18	189	121	41	27	453	134	+319	404	2.138	CONCACAF
2	Australia	16	7	7	177	106	44	27	445	132	+313	362	2.045	AFC
3	South Korea	16	11	12	167	105	44	18	339	98	+241	359	2.150	AFC
4	Iran	12	7	7	162	103	39	20	351	101	+250	348	2.148	AFC
5	Costa Rica	18	6	6	197	98	51	48	334	191	+141	345	1.751	CONCACAF
6	Argentina	15	14	19	171	98	44	29	293	145	+148	338	1.977	CONMEBOL
7	Japan	16	7	8	154	96	29	29	359	94	+265	317	2.058	AFC
8	Netherlands	20	12	12	143	95	28	20	356	105	+251	313	2.189	UEFA
9	Brazil	14	14	23	145	90	37	18	304	92	+212	307	2.117	CONMEBOL
10	Saudi Arabia	13	7	7	154	89	38	27	288	116	+172	305	1.981	AFC
11	Uruguay	18	12	15	190	84	53	53	262	198	+64	305	1.605	CONMEBOL
12	England	18	15	17	130	92	27	11	336	70	+266	303	2.331	UEFA
13	Spain	20	16	17	131	92	27	12	312	83	+229	303	2.313	UEFA
14	Portugal	22	9	9	155	87	36	32	304	153	+151	297	1.916	UEFA
15	Belgium	21	14	15	149	86	30	31	331	154	+177	294	1.973	UEFA
16	United States	19	9	12	168	84	40	44	287	191	+96	292	1.738	CONCACAF
17	Serbia; Serbia and Montenegro; FR Yugoslavia; Yugoslavia	21	12	13	144	85	34	25	296	133	+163	289	2.007	UEFA
18	Sweden	21	12	13	149	88	23	38	290	144	+146	287	1.926	UEFA
19	Italy	18	14	18	128	85	31	12	258	85	+173	286	2.234	UEFA
20	Czech Republic; Representation of Czechs and Slovaks; Czechoslovakia	21	10	10	157	84	34	39	302	138	+164	286	1.822	UEFA
21	Germany; West Germany; Germany	16	16	21	110	88	18	4	344	77	+267	282	2.564	UEFA
22	Slovakia; Representation of Czechs and Slovaks; Czechoslovakia	21	9	9	152	79	35	38	280	149	+131	272	1.789	UEFA
23	Honduras	16	3	3	174	75	47	52	279	203	+76	272	1.563	CONCACAF
24	Paraguay	19	7	9	190	76	44	70	227	225	+2	272	1.432	CONMEBOL
25	Colombia	18	7	7	188	69	61	58	228	196	+32	268	1.426	CONMEBOL
26	Russia; Soviet Union	16	10	11	125	80	24	21	246	81	+165	264	2.112	UEFA
27	Romania	19	5	7	147	76	30	41	257	153	+104	258	1.755	UEFA
28	China	13	1	1	142	78	22	42	285	125	+160	256	1.803	AFC
29	Switzerland	21	12	13	146	72	39	35	234	152	+82	255	1.747	UEFA
30	El Salvador	15	2	2	170	73	35	62	269	200	+69	254	1.494	CONCACAF
31	France	19	13	17	125	75	27	23	250	95	+155	252	2.016	UEFA
32	Scotland	20	10	9	142	73	31	38	223	153	+70	250	1.761	UEFA
33	Denmark	17	6	6	140	71	33	36	264	153	+111	246	1.757	UEFA
34	Tunisia	16	7	7	122	71	31	20	214	86	+118	244	2.000	CAF
35	Poland	20	9	9	138	73	25	40	281	165	+116	244	1.768	UEFA
36	Chile	17	6	9	182	68	38	76	245	248	−3	242	1.330	CONMEBOL
37	Austria	20	9	8	142	70	30	42	254	159	+95	240	1.690	UEFA
38	Iraq	13	2	2	140	67	37	36	253	133	+120	238	1.700	AFC
39	Morocco	16	7	7	127	66	39	22	197	85	+112	237	1.866	CAF
40	Nigeria	16	6	6	122	66	37	19	203	94	+109	235	1.926	CAF
41	Republic of Ireland; Ireland; Irish Free State	22	3	3	155	61	47	47	219	184	+35	230	1.484	UEFA
42	Ecuador	17	5	5	179	62	46	71	210	226	−16	229	1.279	CONMEBOL
43	Qatar	13	1	2	134	67	26	41	238	154	+84	227	1.694	AFC
44	Hungary	20	8	9	138	65	30	43	246	186	+60	225	1.630	UEFA
45	Canada	15	2	3	137	62	38	37	215	144	+71	224	1.635	CONCACAF
46	Egypt	16	4	4	111	65	23	23	197	96	+101	218	1.964	CAF
47	Bulgaria	21	7	7	143	63	29	51	218	210	+8	218	1.524	UEFA
48	Uzbekistan	8	1	1	118	64	24	30	222	115	+107	216	1.831	AFC
49	Trinidad and Tobago	16	1	1	151	60	34	57	230	197	+33	214	1.417	CONCACAF
50	Cameroon	15	8	8	106	62	26	17	175	77	+98	212	2.000	CAF
51	United Arab Emirates	11	1	1	136	61	28	47	230	143	+97	211	1.551	AFC
52	Greece	21	3	3	142	58	34	50	177	191	−14	208	1.465	UEFA
53	New Zealand	15	3	3	107	63	18	26	268	102	+166	207	1.935	OFC
54	Guatemala	17	0	0	136	57	34	45	229	162	+67	205	1.507	CONCACAF
55	Norway	19	4	4	144	57	33	54	222	191	+31	204	1.417	UEFA
56	Peru	18	4	5	186	52	47	87	189	254	−65	203	1.091	CONMEBOL
57	Turkey	19	4	3	146	58	28	60	222	218	+4	202	1.384	UEFA
58	Ivory Coast	13	4	4	94	53	28	13	179	70	+109	186	1.979	CAF
59	Algeria	15	5	5	107	53	26	28	177	105	+72	185	1.729	CAF
60	Kuwait	14	1	1	115	54	22	39	192	119	+73	184	1.600	AFC
61	Bolivia	18	1	3	188	50	34	104	220	364	−144	184	0.979	CONMEBOL
62	Northern Ireland; Ireland	20	3	3	149	48	39	62	162	176	−14	183	1.228	UEFA
63	Ghana	15	5	5	101	52	26	23	163	76	+87	182	1.802	CAF
64	Israel; Mandatory Palestine	22	1	1	140	49	35	56	208	219	−11	182	1.300	UEFA
65	Jamaica	13	1	1	130	47	34	49	147	160	−13	175	1.346	CONCACAF
66	Wales	20	2	2	138	48	30	60	189	191	−2	174	1.261	UEFA
67	Croatia	8	7	7	80	50	21	9	155	55	+95	171	2.138	UEFA
68	Zambia	15	0	0	110	50	21	39	163	107	+56	171	1.555	CAF
69	DR Congo; Zaire	12	2	2	97	48	22	27	157	99	+58	166	1.711	CAF
70	Panama	13	2	2	124	45	29	50	161	183	−22	164	1.323	CONCACAF
71	Oman	10	0	0	106	46	25	35	163	104	+59	163	1.538	AFC
72	Haiti	16	2	2	105	48	19	38	185	137	+48	163	1.552	CONCACAF
73	Syria	16	0	0	108	46	24	38	214	132	+82	162	1.500	AFC
74	Ukraine	7	1	1	87	41	29	17	133	76	+57	152	1.747	UEFA
75	Bahrain	12	0	0	112	39	33	40	136	117	+19	150	1.339	AFC
76	North Korea	11	2	2	99	42	22	35	136	105	+31	148	1.495	AFC
77	Senegal	14	4	4	81	39	26	16	128	64	+64	143	1.766	CAF
78	Jordan	11	1	1	94	40	21	33	150	107	+43	141	1.500	AFC
79	Finland	20	0	0	145	38	26	81	152	311	−159	140	0.966	UEFA
80	Guinea	14	0	0	91	39	17	35	130	116	+14	134	1.473	CAF
81	Venezuela	15	0	0	176	32	32	112	152	376	−224	128	0.727	CONMEBOL
82	South Africa	9	3	4	66	37	12	17	87	56	+31	123	1.864	CAF
83	Burkina Faso; Upper Volta	10	0	0	76	35	16	25	122	90	+32	121	1.592	CAF
84	Bosnia and Herzegovina	8	2	2	76	34	18	24	140	90	+50	120	1.579	UEFA
85	Iceland	15	1	1	122	32	23	67	141	242	−103	119	0.975	UEFA
86	Angola	11	1	1	79	29	30	20	97	74	+23	117	1.481	CAF
87	Slovenia	8	2	2	78	29	21	28	97	88	+9	108	1.385	UEFA
88	Thailand	14	0	0	103	28	23	52	134	174	−40	107	1.039	AFC
89	Gabon	10	0	0	74	30	13	31	86	89	−3	103	1.392	CAF
90	Kenya	14	0	0	84	27	22	35	99	115	−16	103	1.226	CAF
91	Indonesia; Dutch East Indies	14	0	1	99	27	21	51	123	202	−79	102	1.030	AFC
92	Albania	14	0	0	123	28	16	79	92	207	−115	100	0.813	UEFA
93	Libya	12	0	0	72	27	18	27	79	79	0	98	1.361	CAF
94	Suriname; Dutch Guiana	16	0	0	79	27	17	35	126	127	−1	98	1.241	CONCACAF
95	Togo	12	1	1	81	25	22	34	81	103	−22	97	1.198	CAF
96	Lebanon	9	0	0	78	24	21	33	108	106	+2	93	1.192	AFC
97	Hong Kong	14	0	0	89	25	18	46	103	158	−55	93	1.045	AFC
98	Cuba	14	0	1	76	24	20	32	98	110	−12	92	1.211	CONCACAF
99	Malaysia	14	0	0	75	26	14	35	104	133	−29	92	1.227	AFC
100	Curaçao; Netherlands Antilles; Territory of Curaçao	18	1	1	76	23	23	30	94	125	−29	92	1.211	CONCACAF
101	Zimbabwe; Rhodesia	12	0	0	79	22	23	34	72	96	−24	89	1.178	CAF
102	Mali	7	0	0	58	24	16	18	78	59	+19	88	1.517	CAF
103	North Macedonia; Macedonia	8	0	0	81	23	19	39	108	129	−21	88	1.086	UEFA
104	Latvia	10	0	0	93	22	20	51	98	159	−61	86	0.925	UEFA
105	Sudan	14	0	0	82	19	25	38	72	120	−48	82	1.000	CAF
106	Solomon Islands	9	0	0	60	24	9	27	122	126	−4	81	1.350	OFC
107	Uganda	11	0	0	58	23	12	23	58	68	−10	81	1.397	CAF
108	Singapore	13	0	0	84	23	12	49	89	168	−79	81	0.964	AFC
109	Congo	11	0	0	76	21	17	38	79	116	−37	80	1.053	CAF
110	Fiji	11	0	0	60	22	12	26	119	116	+3	78	1.300	OFC
111	Malawi	12	0	0	76	20	18	38	70	105	−35	78	1.026	CAF
112	Liberia	11	0	0	76	22	15	39	60	105	−45	77	1.013	CAF
113	East Germany	9	1	1	47	22	8	17	87	65	+22	74	1.574	defunct
114	Cape Verde	7	1	1	50	22	8	20	52	57	−5	74	1.480	CAF
115	Benin; Dahomey	10	0	0	60	21	10	29	63	104	−41	73	1.217	CAF
116	Lithuania	11	0	0	89	18	19	52	69	145	−76	73	0.820	UEFA
117	New Caledonia	6	0	0	44	21	9	14	99	54	+45	72	1.636	OFC
118	Cyprus	17	0	0	132	18	17	97	102	331	−229	71	0.538	UEFA
119	Kyrgyzstan	8	0	0	56	20	9	27	82	88	−6	69	1.232	AFC
120	Tajikistan	8	0	0	50	19	10	21	88	74	+14	67	1.340	AFC
121	Madagascar	11	0	0	52	19	10	23	66	72	−6	67	1.288	CAF
122	Turkmenistan	8	0	0	52	20	7	25	76	84	−8	67	1.288	AFC
123	Estonia	11	0	0	92	18	13	61	82	208	−126	67	0.728	UEFA
124	Bermuda	9	0	0	50	18	12	20	96	89	+7	66	1.320	CONCACAF
125	Tahiti	9	0	0	49	19	8	22	72	91	−19	65	1.327	OFC
126	Vietnam; South Vietnam	10	0	0	65	19	6	40	70	115	−45	63	0.969	AFC
127	Namibia	9	0	0	60	16	14	30	59	103	−44	62	1.033	CAF
128	Palestine	7	0	0	50	16	13	21	74	65	+9	61	1.220	AFC
129	Yemen; North Yemen	11	0	0	66	15	16	35	67	108	−41	61	0.924	AFC
130	Mozambique	10	0	0	52	17	9	26	49	75	−26	60	1.154	CAF
131	Sierra Leone	12	0	0	57	16	12	29	52	82	−30	60	1.053	CAF
132	Armenia	8	0	0	78	14	17	47	64	161	−97	59	0.756	UEFA
133	Montenegro	5	0	0	46	15	13	18	65	71	−6	58	1.261	UEFA
134	Kazakhstan	8	0	0	76	14	16	46	85	161	−76	58	0.763	UEFA
135	Ethiopia	13	0	0	59	13	17	29	61	87	−26	56	0.949	CAF
136	Belarus	8	0	0	72	14	14	44	72	138	−66	56	0.778	UEFA
137	Saint Vincent and the Grenadines	9	0	0	66	16	8	42	89	195	−106	56	0.848	CONCACAF
138	Niger	9	0	0	44	16	6	22	51	75	−24	54	1.227	CAF
139	Saint Kitts and Nevis	8	0	0	40	15	8	17	77	75	+2	53	1.325	CONCACAF
140	India	10	0	0	57	12	17	28	52	101	−49	53	0.930	AFC
141	Georgia	8	0	0	70	12	17	41	64	116	−52	53	0.757	UEFA
142	Antigua and Barbuda	12	0	0	50	15	7	28	73	103	−30	52	1.040	CONCACAF
143	Tanzania	11	0	0	49	12	15	22	49	67	−18	51	1.041	CAF
144	Dominican Republic	10	0	0	37	14	6	17	61	59	+2	48	1.297	CONCACAF
145	Botswana	8	0	0	46	13	7	26	45	69	−24	46	1.000	CAF
146	Rwanda	8	0	0	54	11	12	31	51	78	−27	45	0.833	CAF
147	Faroe Islands	9	0	0	88	12	8	68	52	216	−164	44	0.400	UEFA
148	Bangladesh	11	0	0	66	11	10	45	41	163	−122	43	0.652	AFC
149	Vanuatu	8	0	0	40	13	3	24	81	100	−19	42	1.050	OFC
150	Equatorial Guinea	7	0	0	38	11	7	20	33	55	−22	40	1.053	CAF
151	Barbados	10	0	0	45	11	7	27	42	86	−44	40	0.888	CONCACAF
152	Nicaragua	9	0	0	35	13	2	20	48	61	−13	38	1.086	CONCACAF
153	Gambia	10	0	0	36	10	7	19	48	57	−9	37	1.028	CAF
154	Azerbaijan	8	0	0	72	7	16	49	37	138	−99	37	0.514	UEFA
155	Burundi	8	0	0	32	10	6	16	32	41	−9	36	1.125	CAF
156	Guyana	12	0	0	42	10	6	26	46	93	−47	36	0.857	CONCACAF
157	Puerto Rico	11	0	0	33	9	8	16	42	59	−17	35	1.060	CONCACAF
158	Papua New Guinea	6	0	0	29	9	7	13	53	49	+4	34	1.172	OFC
159	Grenada	9	0	0	33	10	4	19	62	66	−4	34	1.030	CONCACAF
160	Samoa; Western Samoa	7	0	0	31	11	1	19	42	104	−62	34	1.097	OFC
161	Luxembourg	22	0	0	148	8	10	130	78	464	−386	34	0.230	UEFA
162	Maldives	8	0	0	42	9	4	29	45	143	−98	31	0.738	AFC
163	Belize	8	0	0	33	8	6	19	38	69	−31	30	0.910	CONCACAF
164	Guinea-Bissau	8	0	0	30	6	11	13	24	41	−17	29	0.967	CAF
165	Moldova	8	0	0	76	5	14	57	45	177	−132	29	0.382	UEFA
166	Lesotho	9	0	0	36	5	13	18	24	64	−40	28	0.778	CAF
167	Chinese Taipei; Taiwan	13	0	0	74	8	4	62	48	251	−203	28	0.378	AFC
168	Philippines	6	0	0	35	7	6	22	31	82	−51	27	0.771	AFC
169	Afghanistan	6	0	0	30	7	6	17	20	74	−54	27	0.900	AFC
170	Nepal	9	0	0	46	7	6	33	31	143	−112	27	0.587	AFC
171	Saint Lucia	8	0	0	28	8	2	18	37	71	−34	26	0.929	CONCACAF
172	Malta	14	0	0	120	4	14	102	46	349	−303	26	0.217	UEFA
173	Tonga	7	0	0	24	8	1	15	27	85	−58	25	1.042	OFC
174	Myanmar	5	0	0	30	6	4	20	25	102	−77	22	0.733	AFC
175	Chad	7	0	0	28	6	3	19	21	50	−29	21	0.750	CAF
176	Kosovo	3	0	0	26	5	5	16	18	48	−30	20	0.769	UEFA
177	Eswatini; Swaziland	9	0	0	31	4	8	19	22	60	−38	20	0.645	CAF
178	Dominica	8	0	0	28	5	5	18	25	72	−47	20	0.714	CONCACAF
179	Comoros	5	0	0	20	5	4	11	17	34	−17	19	0.950	CAF
180	Mongolia	7	0	0	26	6	1	19	17	77	−60	19	0.731	AFC
181	Sri Lanka	9	0	0	41	4	7	30	27	103	−76	19	0.463	AFC
182	Mauritania	8	0	0	32	3	9	20	19	55	−36	18	0.562	CAF
183	Aruba	8	0	0	24	5	3	16	29	71	−42	18	0.750	CONCACAF
184	Cambodia	7	0	0	38	4	5	29	22	136	−114	17	0.447	AFC
185	Central African Republic	5	0	0	26	4	4	18	23	54	−31	16	0.615	CAF
186	Bahamas	7	0	0	22	4	4	14	21	80	−59	16	0.727	CONCACAF
187	Andorra	7	0	0	70	4	4	62	25	202	−177	16	0.229	UEFA
188	Macau	11	0	0	39	4	3	32	17	173	−156	15	0.385	AFC
189	Laos	6	0	0	30	3	5	22	24	127	−103	14	0.467	AFC
190	Liechtenstein	8	0	0	78	2	7	69	25	250	−225	13	0.167	UEFA
191	Montserrat	7	0	0	17	3	3	11	20	59	−39	12	0.706	CONCACAF
192	Mauritius	9	0	0	30	2	6	22	21	69	−48	12	0.400	CAF
193	Bhutan	3	0	0	14	4	0	10	11	62	−51	12	0.857	AFC
194	U.S. Virgin Islands	7	0	0	21	3	2	16	9	96	−87	11	0.524	CONCACAF
195	Cook Islands	7	0	0	21	3	1	17	17	66	−49	10	0.476	OFC
196	Guam	4	0	0	22	3	1	18	11	87	−76	10	0.455	AFC
197	American Samoa	6	0	0	19	3	1	15	11	138	−127	10	0.526	OFC
198	Cayman Islands	8	0	0	24	1	6	16	9	62	−53	9	0.375	CONCACAF
199	Djibouti	6	0	0	31	2	3	26	17	119	−102	9	0.290	CAF
200	Pakistan	10	0	0	40	1	5	34	15	148	−133	8	0.200	AFC
201	South Sudan	3	0	0	14	0	7	7	5	26	−21	7	0.500	CAF
202	São Tomé and Príncipe	6	0	0	18	2	1	15	9	45	−36	7	0.388	CAF
203	Somalia	8	0	0	21	1	4	16	6	45	−39	7	0.333	CAF
204	Brunei	5	0	0	18	2	0	16	5	74	−69	6	0.333	AFC
205	British Virgin Islands	7	0	0	20	0	5	15	8	65	−57	5	0.250	CONCACAF
206	Turks and Caicos Islands	7	0	0	15	1	2	12	7	69	−62	5	0.333	CONCACAF
207	Saar	1	0	0	4	1	1	2	4	8	−4	4	1.000	defunct
208	Eritrea	5	0	0	10	0	3	7	4	20	−16	3	0.300	CAF
209	Anguilla	7	0	0	20	0	3	17	3	86	−83	3	0.150	CONCACAF
210	Seychelles	7	0	0	26	0	2	24	8	99	−91	2	0.077	CAF
211	San Marino	9	0	0	84	0	2	82	14	395	−381	2	0.024	UEFA
212	South Yemen	1	0	0	2	0	1	1	4	7	−3	1	0.500	defunct
213	Tuvalu	1	0	0	4	0	1	3	2	22	−20	1	0.250	OFC
214	Timor-Leste	5	0	0	18	0	0	18	6	87	−81	0	0.000	AFC
215	Gibraltar	3	0	0	28	0	0	28	10	118	−108	0	0.000	UEFA

== Player records ==
=== All-time top scorers ===
As of 31 March 2026

Active international players are highlighted in bold.

Rank	Player	Goals	Apps
1	(Portugal) Cristiano Ronaldo	41	52
2	(Guatemala) Carlos Ruiz	39	47
3	(Argentina) Lionel Messi	36	72
4	(Poland) **Robert Lewandowski**	35	46
4	(Iran) Ali Daei	35	51
6	(Bosnia and Herzegovina) Edin Džeko	31	46
7	(New Zealand) **Chris Wood**	29	31
7	(Iran) **Sardar Azmoun**	29	41
7	(Uruguay) Luis Suárez	29	64
10	(Iran) Karim Bagheri	28	29
11	(Japan) Kazuyoshi Miura	27	25
12	(United Arab Emirates) Ali Mabkhout	26	33
12	(Ukraine) Andriy Shevchenko	26	40
14	(England) **Harry Kane**	25	22
14	(Australia) Tim Cahill	25	37
14	(Honduras) Carlos Pavón	25	37
14	(South Korea) **Son Heung-min**	25	47
18	(Iran) **Mehdi Taremi**	24	44
19	(Netherlands) **Memphis Depay**	23	23
19	(Mexico) Jared Borgetti	23	24

== Qualification tournament rules ==
Qualification tournaments generally consist of a number of stages, made up of groups or knock-out ties.

=== Groups ===
In all group tournaments, three points are awarded for a win, one for a draw, and none for a loss. FIFA has set the order of the tie-breakers for teams that finish level on points:

1. goal difference in all group matches
2. greater number of goals scored in all group matches

Where teams are still not able to be separated, the following tie-breakers are used:

1. greater number of points obtained in matches between the tied teams
2. goal difference in matches between the tied teams
3. greater number of goals scored in matches between the tied teams
4. goals scored away from home in matches between the tied teams, if the tie is only between two teams

Where teams are still equal, then a play-off on neutral ground, with extra time and penalties if necessary will be played if FIFA deems such a play-off able to be fitted within the coordinated international match calendar. If this is not deemed feasible, then the result will be determined by fair play points and then the drawing of lots.

Note that this order of tie-breaker application has not always been applied. While it was used in the 2010 qualifiers, the qualification for the 2006 World Cup used the head-to-head comparison prior to goal difference (although this system was – where applicable – used in the 2006 finals themselves). If these rules had applied in 2006, then Nigeria would have qualified rather than Angola.

=== Home-and-away ties ===
Most knock-out qualifiers (such as the inter-confederation play-offs and many preliminary ties) are played over two legs. The team that scores a greater aggregate number of goals qualifies. Away goals rule applies. If these rules fail to determine the winner, extra time and penalty shoot-outs are used.

Occasionally – usually when one entrant lacks adequate facilities to host international matches – ties are played over a single leg, in which case matches level after 90 minutes will go to extra time and then to a penalty shoot-out if required.

Alternatively, "home" matches can be played in neutral countries, or occasionally one team will host both matches. In the latter case the visiting team will still be considered as the "home" team for one of the legs – which may determine which side advances under the away goals rule, as occurred in CONCACAF qualification in 2010.

== See also ==
- FIFA World Cup
- FIFA World Cup records and statistics
- FIFA Women's World Cup
- FIFA Women's World Cup qualification
- FIFA Women's World Cup records and statistics
- UEFA European Championship qualifying
- AFC Asian Cup qualifiers
- CONCACAF Gold Cup qualification
- Asian nations at the FIFA World Cup
- African nations at the FIFA World Cup
- North, Central American and Caribbean nations at the FIFA World Cup
- South American nations at the FIFA World Cup
- Oceanian nations at the FIFA World Cup
- European nations at the FIFA World Cup
