= Vyacheslav Chanov =

Russian footballer

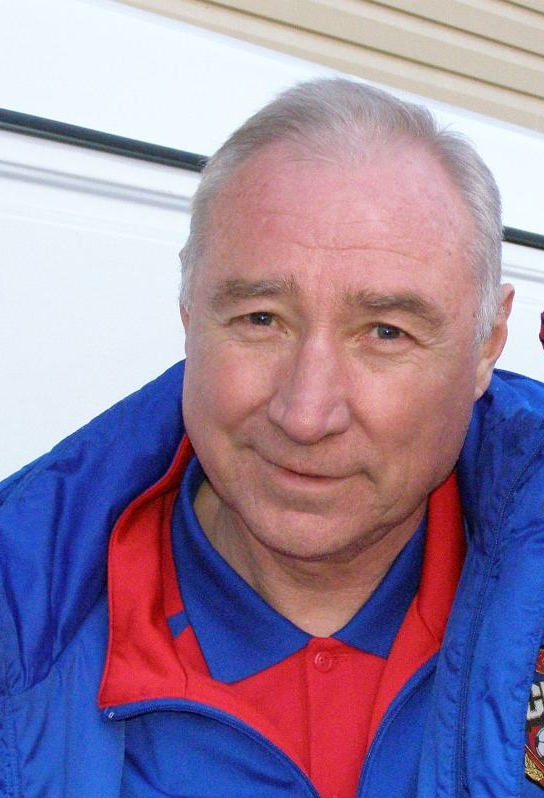

Personal information
- Full name: Vyacheslav Viktorovich Chanov
- Date of birth: 23 October 1951 (age 75)
- Place of birth: Moscow, USSR
- Height: 1.87 m (6 ft 2 in)
- Position: Goalkeeper

Youth career
- Shakhtar Donetsk

Senior career*
Years	Team	Apps	(Gls)
1969–1978	Shakhtar Donetsk	54	(0)
1979–1984	Torpedo Moscow	177	(0)
1985–1986	Neftçi Baku	33	(0)
1987	CSKA Moscow	19	(0)
1990–1993	Optik Rathenow		
1994	Eisenhüttenstädter FC Stahl		

International career
1984	USSR	1	(0)

Managerial career
- 1994: FC TRASKO Moscow (director)
- 1995: PFC CSKA Moscow (goalkeeping coach)
- 1997–1998: Prialit Reutov Academy (managing director)
- 1998–1999: PFC CSKA Moscow (goalkeeping coach)
- 2002–2014: PFC CSKA Moscow (goalkeeping coach)
- 2014–2015: PFC CSKA Moscow (academy GK coach)
- 2015–2016: PFC CSKA Moscow (U-21 GK coach)
- 2017–2018: FC Arsenal Tula (GK coach)
- 2018: FC Khimik Novomoskovsk (GK coach)
- * Club domestic league appearances and goals

Vyacheslav Viktorovich Chanov (Russian: Вячеслав Викторович Чанов; born 23 October 1951) is a Russian football coach and a former goalkeeper.

== International career ==
Chanov played his only game for USSR on 28 March 1984 in a friendly against West Germany, and he was the team captain in that game. He was included in Soviet 1982 FIFA World Cup squad, but did not play in any games.

== Personal life ==
He is the brother of fellow football goalkeeper Viktor Chanov.

== Honours ==
=== Individual ===
- Goalkeeper of the Year: 1981.
