= Glen Adam =

New Zealand footballer (born 1959)

Personal information
- Full name: Glen N. J. Adam
- Date of birth: 22 May 1959 (age 67)
- Place of birth: New Zealand
- Height: 1.84 m (6 ft 0 in)
- Position: Defender

Senior career*
Years	Team	Apps	(Gls)
?–1978	Christchurch United		
1979–1980	Blockhouse Bay		
1981–1983	Mount Wellington		
1984–?	Auckland University		

International career
1978–1984	New Zealand	16	(1)
- * Club domestic league appearances and goals

Glen N. J. Adam (born 22 May 1959 in New Zealand) is an association football player who represented New Zealand gaining 16 A-International caps between 1978 and 1984, scoring one goal.

He was a member the All Whites squad at the 1982 FIFA World Cup in Spain, where they lost all 3 group games to Scotland, USSR and Brazil.
