= Yuri Susloparov =

Soviet footballer (1958–2012)

Personal information
- Full name: Yuri Vladimirovich Susloparov
- Date of birth: 14 August 1958
- Place of birth: Kharkiv, Ukrainian SSR, USSR
- Date of death: 28 May 2012 (aged 53)
- Height: 1.86 m (6 ft 1 in)
- Positions: Defender; midfielder

Senior career*
Years	Team	Apps	(Gls)
1976	Metalist Kharkiv	0	(0)
1977–1980	Karpaty Lviv	78	(3)
1981–1985	Torpedo Moscow	115	(14)
1986–1990	Spartak Moscow	80	(1)
1992	Veres Rivne	22	(3)
1993	FC Krasnogvardeyets Moscow		

International career
1981–1982	USSR	7	(0)

Managerial career
- 2001–2002: Abahani Krira Chakra
Medal record
Men's football
Representing Soviet Union
UEFA European Under-21 Championship
Winner	1980 Europe
- * Club domestic league appearances and goals

Yuri Vladimirovich Susloparov (Russian: Юрий Владимирович Суслопаров; 14 August 1958 – 28 May 2012) was a Soviet football player and manager.

== International career ==
Susloparov made his debut for USSR on 7 October 1981 in a 1982 FIFA World Cup qualifier against Turkey. He participated in the 1982 FIFA World Cup finals, coming on as a second-half substitute in the 2–1 defeat by Brazil in Seville.

== Honours ==
Spartak Moscow

- Soviet Top League: 1987, 1989; third place 1986

Soviet Union U21

- UEFA European Under-21 Football Championship: 1980
