= John Hill (New Zealand footballer) =

New Zealand footballer (born 1949)

Personal information
- Date of birth: 8 May 1949 (age 77)
- Place of birth: Northern Ireland
- Position: Defender

Senior career*
Years	Team	Apps	(Gls)
- Gisborne City

International career
1980–1982	New Zealand	17	(0)
- * Club domestic league appearances and goals

John B. Hill (born 8 May 1949) is a former association football player who represented New Zealand at the 1982 FIFA World Cup.

Hill's first professional club was Glentoran in Belfast, Northern Ireland. He moved to New Zealand in 1975, where he played for Gisborne City from 1980 until 1982.

Hill made his full All Whites debut in a 4–0 win over Mexico on 20 August 1980 and ended his international playing career with 17 A-international caps to his credit.

He represented the All Whites at the 1982 FIFA World Cup in Spain in the 2–5 loss to Scotland, bud did not feature in the other two matches against USSR and Brazil. His solitary finals appearance was Hill's last cap for his adopted country.
