= Kenny Cresswell =

New Zealand footballer

Personal information
- Full name: Kenneth Grant Cresswell
- Date of birth: 4 June 1958 (age 68)
- Place of birth: Invercargill, New Zealand
- Height: 1.75 m (5 ft 9 in)
- Position: Midfielder

Senior career*
Years	Team	Apps	(Gls)
- Nelson United
- Gisborne City

International career
1978–1987	New Zealand	33	(2)
- * Club domestic league appearances and goals

Kenneth "Kenny" Grant Cresswell (born 4 June 1958 in New Zealand) is an association football player who represented New Zealand internationally, appearing in all 3 matches of New Zealand's first FIFA World Cup finals appearance.

== Career ==
Cresswell made his full All Whites debut in a 2–0 win over Singapore on 1 October 1978. He played in all 3 matches at the 1982 FIFA World Cup in Spain, where they lost to Scotland, USSR and Brazil. Cresswell ended his international playing career having played 64 times for New Zealand, of which 33 were official full internationals in which he scored 2 goals. His final cap was a substitute appearance in a 12–0 win over Western Samoa on 11 November 1987.
