= John Adshead =

English footballer (born 1942)

John Adshead ONZM
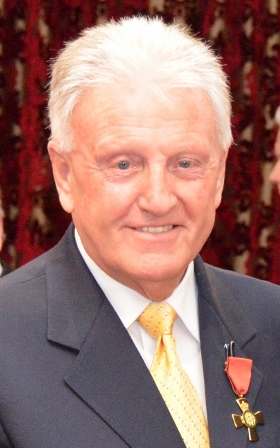
- Adshead in 2013

Personal information
- Date of birth: 27 March 1942 (age 84)
- Place of birth: Fleetwood, Lancashire, England

Managerial career
- Years: Team
- Manurewa
- 1979–82, 1989–90: New Zealand
- 2005–06: New Zealand Knights

John Adshead ONZM (born 27 March 1942) is an English-born former head coach of New Zealand's national football team—the All Whites—whom he led to their first FIFA World Cup appearance in the 1982 tournament.

== Life and work ==
Adshead is one of the most important figures in the history of New Zealand football. Born in Fleetwood, Lancashire, England, in 1942, Adshead first started off as a player with Sidmouth Town A.F.C. before injury ended his career at just 22. Following his retirement as a player, Adshead instantly got into coaching and upon his arrival in Western Australia in 1970 he coached for six years in the Western Australian State League.

It was in New Zealand where Adshead made his mark, after arriving in the country in January 1976. With his club Manurewa he won six trophies including the Chatham Cup in 1978 and promotion into the top division in New Zealand the same year. In 1979 Adshead was appointed as the coach of the New Zealand national side. He successfully led the team to the 1982 FIFA World Cup after they overcame the Rudi Gutendorf led Australia as well as Indonesia, Fiji and Chinese Taipei in the first qualifying round before meeting Kuwait, Saudi Arabia and China in the second round, eventually finishing joint second with China, against whom New Zealand won a playoff 2–1 in Singapore to qualify for the World Cup for the first time in their history. It was to be another 28 years before they repeated this feat, qualifying for the 2010 FIFA World Cup in South Africa. A total of 15 qualifying games were required by the All Whites to reach the finals tournament of 1982. New Zealand lost all three finals games, against Scotland (5–2), Soviet Union (3–0) and Brazil (4–0)

After leaving the New Zealand national coaching job in February 1983, Adshead spent time in football obscurity again before returning to coach New Zealand again in 1989 to try to get the team to the 1990 FIFA World Cup but they failed to get out of the Oceania round by one point. Adshead again coached in Perth and as a youth coach in Oman before returning to New Zealand to coach the New Zealand Knights in the inaugural season of the A-League. A cancer scare just after his appointment and the poor on-field performances of the club led to his retirement after the end of the 2005–06 season.

In the 2013 Queen's Birthday Honours, Adshead was appointed an Officer of the New Zealand Order of Merit, for services to football.

In October 2013, Adshead's achievements were recognised at a tribute event held by the independent group Friends of Football and in November 2014, he was presented with the Friends of Football inaugural Medal of Excellence

== Managerial statistics ==
Team	From	To	Record				
Team	From	To	G	W	D	L	Win %
New Zealand Knights FC	January 2005	April 2006	21	1	3	17	4.76
Total			21	1	3	17	4.76
