= Damir Matovinović =

Croatian football referee

Damir Matovinović (born April 6, 1940) is a Croatian retired football referee. He is mostly known for supervising one match (between Brazil and New Zealand) at the 1982 FIFA World Cup in Spain.
