= Yuri Gavrilov (footballer, born 1953) =

Russian footballer

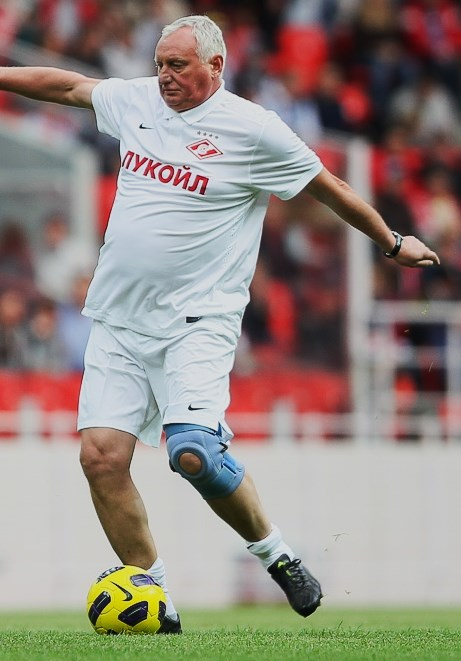
- Yuri Gavrilov (2014)

Personal information
- Full name: Yuri Vasilyevich Gavrilov
- Date of birth: 3 May 1953 (age 73)
- Place of birth: Setun, Odintsovsky District, Moscow Oblast, Soviet Union
- Height: 1.85 m (6 ft 1 in)
- Position: Midfielder

Senior career*
Years	Team	Apps	(Gls)
1972	Iskra Moscow		
1973–1976	Dynamo Moscow	37	(5)
1977–1985	Spartak Moscow	280	(89)
1986	Dnipro Dnipropetrovsk	25	(3)
1987	Lokomotiv Moscow	35	(12)
1988–1989	Porin Pallotoverit	36	(11)
1990	Lokomotiv Moscow	16	(0)
1991–1992	Asmaral Moscow	60	(8)
1992	Presnya Moscow	10	(4)
1993	Interros Moscow	38	(5)
1994	Saturn Ramenskoye	41	(13)
1995–1996	FC Agro Chişinău	16	(0)
1996–1997	Spumante Cricova	4	(0)

International career
1978–1985	Soviet Union	46	(10)

Managerial career
- 1994: FC Saturn Ramenskoye (assistant)
- 1996: FC Agro Chișinău (assistant)
- 1996–1997: Constructorul Chişinău (assistant)
- 2000: FC Chkalovets-Olimpik Novosibirsk
- 2001: DR Congo
- 2002: FC Mostransgaz Gazoprovod
- 2003: Torpedo-Metallurg Moscow (reserves assistant)
- * Club domestic league appearances and goals

Olympic medal record

Representing Soviet Union

Men's Football
Bronze medal – third place	1980 Moscow	Team competition

Yuri Vasilyevich Gavrilov (Russian: Юрий Васильевич Гаврилов; born 3 May 1953 in Setun, Odintsovsky District, Moscow Oblast) is a Russian football manager and a former midfielder who played for Dynamo Moscow and Spartak Moscow.

He made 46 appearances for the Soviet Union national football team and scored 10 goals. He also competed for the Soviet Union at the 1980 Summer Olympics and the 1982 FIFA World Cup in Spain. His creative skills are immortalized by Konstantin Beskov's famous phrase "If you don't know what to do with the ball, pass it to Gavrilov". Yuri Gavrilov has his own football school in Moscow called SC Svyatogor.

== Career ==
Gavrilov's football career started in Iskra Moscow football school when he was 7. He was invited by school director who saw Yury playing with other kids on the Iskra stadium. When he was 19, Konstantin Beskov took him to Dinamo Moscow from Iskra amateur team. But there was an expensive number of quality players in 1970s Dinamo, and Gavrilov couldn't find a permanent place in Dinamo squad.

Gavrilov joined the Spartak Moscow in 1977 after he followed the Spartak coach Konstantin Beskov. The player who played as a winger in the Dynamo Moscow team was used as a playmaker in the new Spartak team by Beskov, becoming one of the best attacking midfielders in the SovietUnion.

While he made a lot of good passes, he scored a lot of goals as well. Gavrilov was Soviet Top League top goal-scorer twice, scored 140 times during his career.

During his professional career Gavrilov played also for the Finnish club Porin Pallotoverit and Moldovan club FC Agro Chişinău.

In 2001 Gavrilov took charge of the DR Congo national football team for one game. He coached DR Congo in the 2002 FIFA World Cup qualification match against Ivory Coast.

== Personal life ==
His son Yuri Gavrilov also professional footballer.
