= 2011 VFF Cup squads =

Below are the squads for the 2011 VFF Cup, hosted by Vietnam, which took place between 19 and 23 October 2011.

== Vietnam ==
Coach: (Germany) Falko Götz

No.	Pos.	Player	Date of birth (age)	Caps	Club
1	GK	Nguyễn Tuấn Mạnh	July 31, 1990 (aged 21)	3	(Vietnam) Hoàng Anh Gia Lai
2	DF	Dương Thanh Hào	June 23, 1991 (aged 20)	2	(Vietnam) TĐCS Đồng Tháp
3	DF	Nguyễn Thành Long Giang	September 6, 1988 (aged 23)	20	(Vietnam) Navibank Sài Gòn
4	DF	Âu Văn Hoàn	October 1, 1989 (aged 22)	6	(Vietnam) Sông Lam Nghệ An
5	MF	Ngô Hoàng Thịnh	January 9, 1992 (aged 19)	5	(Vietnam) Sông Lam Nghệ An
6	DF	Nguyễn Quốc Long	February 19, 1988 (aged 23)	3	(Vietnam) Hà Nội T&T
7	FW	Hoàng Đình Tùng	August 24, 1988 (aged 23)	10	(Vietnam) Thanh Hóa
8	MF	Nguyễn Trọng Hoàng	April 14, 1988 (aged 23)	17	(Vietnam) Sông Lam Nghệ An
9	FW	Lê Văn Thắng	February 8, 1990 (aged 21)	4	(Vietnam) Thanh Hóa
10	MF	Lê Hoàng Thiên	December 25, 1990 (aged 20)	6	(Vietnam) Hoàng Anh Gia Lai
12	FW	Nguyễn Văn Quyết	July 1, 1991 (aged 20)	10	(Vietnam) Hà Nội T&T
13	DF	Trần Tấn Đạt	21 October 1989 (aged 21)		(Vietnam) Khatoco Khánh Hòa
14	DF	Chu Ngọc Anh	9 January 1989 (aged 22)		(Vietnam) Hà Nội
16	MF	Trần Mạnh Dũng	9 March 1990 (aged 21)		(Vietnam) The Vissai Ninh Bình
18	GK	Trần Bửu Ngọc	14 June 1991 (aged 20)		(Vietnam) TĐCS Đồng Tháp
19	MF	Phạm Thành Lương	10 September 1988 (aged 23)		(Vietnam) Hà Nội
22	MF	Hoàng Văn Bình	1 February 1989 (aged 22)		(Vietnam) Sông Lam Nghệ An
23	DF	Phạm Văn Nam	November 3, 1992 (aged 18)		(Vietnam) Mikado Nam Định
25	FW	Nguyễn Tuấn Anh	19 August 1984 (aged 27)		(Vietnam) Navibank Sài Gòn
27	GK	Lâm Ấn Độ	29 September 1991 (aged 20)		(Vietnam) TĐCS Đồng Tháp
29	DF	Nguyễn Tấn Công	15 March 1989 (aged 22)		(Vietnam) TDC Bình Dương
30	DF	Bùi Xuân Hiếu	1 January 1990 (aged 21)		(Vietnam) Hoàng Anh Gia Lai

== Uzbekistan ==
Coach: Vadim Abramov

No.	Pos.	Player	Date of birth (age)	Caps	Club
3	DF	Abdukakhkhor Khodjiakbarov	July 18, 1989 (aged 22)	3	(Uzbekistan)
7	MF	Jasur Hasanov	August 2, 1983 (aged 28)	24	Qatar SC
16	MF	Oybek Kilichev	January 17, 1989 (aged 22)	2	(Uzbekistan)

== Malaysia ==
Coach: Ong Kim Swee

No.	Pos.	Player	Date of birth (age)	Caps	Club
1	GK	Khairul Fahmi Che Mat (c)	January 7, 1989 (aged 22)	12	(Malaysia) Kelantan FA
4	DF	Syazwan Tajuddin	July 1, 1994 (aged 17)	2	(Malaysia) Harimau Muda B
5	DF	Mohd Amer Saidin	July 25, 1992 (aged 19)	7	(Malaysia) Harimau Muda A
9	FW	Baddrol Bakhtiar	February 1, 1988 (aged 23)	2	(Malaysia) Kedah FA
11	MF	K. Gurusamy	November 20, 1988 (age 36)	7	(Malaysia) Harimau Muda A
12	MF	Gary Steven Robbat	September 3, 1992 (age 32)	5	(Malaysia) Harimau Muda A
13	MF	Nazirul Naim Che Hashim	April 6, 1993 (aged 18)	2	(Malaysia) Harimau Muda A
14	FW	Izzaq Faris Ramlan	April 18, 1990 (aged 21)	8	(Malaysia) Harimau Muda A
15	FW	Yong Kuong Yong	September 18, 1988 (aged 23)	2	(Malaysia) Kuala Lumpur FA
17	DF	Mohd Fandi Othman	April 25, 1992 (aged 19)	7	(Malaysia) Harimau Muda A
19	FW	Syahrul Azwari Ibrahim	January 12, 1993 (aged 18)	4	(Malaysia) Harimau Muda A
	GK	Mohd Izham Tarmizi	April 24, 1991 (aged 20)	4	(Malaysia) Harimau Muda A
	GK	Mohd Zamir Selamat	June 9, 1989 (aged 22)	0	(Malaysia) Harimau Muda A
	DF	K. Reuben	April 2, 1990 (aged 21)	3	(Malaysia) ATM FA
	DF	Mohd Muslim Ahmad	April 25, 1989 (aged 22)	10	(Malaysia) Harimau Muda A
	MF	Abdul Shukur Jusoh	February 28, 1989 (aged 22)	6	(Malaysia) Harimau Muda A
	MF	Wan Zaharulnizam Zakaria	May 8, 1991 (aged 20)	6	(Malaysia) Harimau Muda A
	MF	Nazmi Faiz	August 16, 1994 (aged 17)	2	(Malaysia) Harimau Muda B
	MF	See Kok Luen	June 3, 1988 (aged 23)	3	(Malaysia) Kuala Lumpur FA
	FW	D. Saarvindran	October 4, 1992 (aged 19)	1	(Malaysia) Felda United FC

== Myanmar ==
Coach: (Sweden) Stefan Hansson

No.	Pos.	Player	Date of birth (age)	Caps	Club
1	GK	Thiha Sithu	February 10, 1987 (aged 24)	6	(Myanmar) Ayeyawady United
