= 2007 AFF U-20 Youth Championship =

AFF U-20 Youth Championship Vietnam 2007

Tournament details
- Host country: Vietnam
- City: Ho Chi Minh City
- Dates: 31 July – 13 August
- Teams: 8 (from 1 confederation)
- Venue: 1 (in 1 host city)

Final positions
- Champions: Vietnam (1st title)
- Runners-up: Malaysia
- Third place: Thailand
- Fourth place: Myanmar

Tournament statistics
- Matches played: 16
- Goals scored: 66 (4.13 per match)
- Top scorer(s): (Thailand) Kraikitti In-utane (5 goals)

The AFF U-20 Youth Championship 2007 was held in Ho Chi Minh City, Vietnam from 31 July to 13 August 2007.

== Participating nations ==
- Brunei
- Cambodia
- Laos
- Malaysia
- Myanmar
- Singapore
- Thailand
- Vietnam

== Tournament ==
=== Group stage ===
==== Group A ====
| Team | Pld | W | D | L | GF | GA | GD | Pts |
|---|---|---|---|---|---|---|---|---|
| Myanmar | 3 | 3 | 0 | 0 | 8 | 2 | +6 | 9 |
| Malaysia | 3 | 2 | 0 | 1 | 11 | 5 | +6 | 6 |
| Laos | 3 | 1 | 0 | 2 | 5 | 12 | −7 | 3 |
| Singapore | 3 | 0 | 0 | 3 | 2 | 7 | −5 | 0 |

1 August 2007
15:30

| Malaysia | 3 – 0 | Singapore |
|---|---|---|
| Yusanee Saad 29'; Fakri 34'; Firdaus 63' | Report |

Thanh Long Sports Complex

1 August 2007
17:30

| Laos | 0 – 4 | Myanmar |
|---|---|---|
| | Report | Kyaw Kyaw Khine 2'; Aung Mung Kyaw Mo 3'; Myint Naing 10'; Zin Myo Aung 86' |

Thanh Long Sports Complex

3 August 2007
15:30

| Singapore | 1 – 2 | Laos |
|---|---|---|
| Ng Heng Meng Seng 43' | Report | Phatthana Syvilay 9'; Phoutthavong Sapackdy 75' |

Thanh Long Sports Complex

3 August 2007
17:30

| Malaysia | 1 – 2 | Myanmar |
|---|---|---|
| K. Gurusamy 82' | Report | Kyaw Kyaw Khine 24'; Pyae Phyo Oo 89' |

Thanh Long Sports Complex

5 August 2007
15:30

| Laos | 3 – 7 | Malaysia |
|---|---|---|
| Sayya Meungmany 5', 6'; Phoutthavong Sapackdy 59' | Report | Syazwan Zainon 43'; K. Gurusamy 65', 75'; Shukor Jusoh 77'; Firdaus 82'; Yusaini Che Saad 89'; Mohd Shazlan Alias 90+2' |

Thanh Long Sports Complex

5 August 2007
17:30

| Myanmar | 2 – 1 | Singapore |
|---|---|---|
| Pyae Phyo Oo 51' (pen.), 79' | Report | Gabriel Quak 67' |

Thanh Long Sports Complex

==== Group B ====
| Team | Pld | W | D | L | GF | GA | GD | Pts |
|---|---|---|---|---|---|---|---|---|
| Thailand | 3 | 2 | 1 | 0 | 15 | 1 | +14 | 7 |
| Vietnam | 3 | 2 | 1 | 0 | 12 | 1 | +11 | 7 |
| Brunei | 3 | 1 | 0 | 2 | 2 | 14 | −12 | 3 |
| Cambodia | 3 | 0 | 0 | 3 | 1 | 14 | −13 | 0 |

31 July 2007
15:30

| Cambodia | 0 – 5 | Vietnam |
|---|---|---|
| | Report | Hoàng Văn Bình 2'; Hout Sokunthea 3' (o.g.); Nguyen Van Quan 23'; Tran Tan Dat 55'; Trần Mạnh Dũng 63' |

Thanh Long Sports Complex

31 July 2007
17:30

| Brunei | 0 – 7 | Thailand |
|---|---|---|
| | Report | Attapong Nooprom 9'; Abdul Aziz Tamit 77' (o.g.); Nirunrit Jaroensuk 79'; Sarawut Masuk 83'; Kraikitti In-utane 85', 89', 90+1' |

Thanh Long Sports Complex

2 August 2007
15:30

| Vietnam | 1 – 1 | Thailand |
|---|---|---|
| Nguyen Hong Viet 37' | Report | Chu Ngọc Anh 12' (o.g.) |

Thanh Long Sports Complex

2 August 2007
17:30

| Brunei | 2 – 1 | Cambodia |
|---|---|---|
| Abdul Razak Azeman 46'; Abdullehem Hayyaruzzon Meriaddin 49' | | Keo Phokphon 77' |

Thanh Long Sports Complex

4 August 2007
15:30

| Thailand | 7 – 0 | Cambodia |
|---|---|---|
| Nirunrit Jaroensuk 13', 44'; Sarawut Masuk 17'; Kraikitti In-utane 57', 63'; Kroekrit Thaweekarn 71'; Yodrak Namueangrak 73' | Report |

Thanh Long Sports Complex

4 August 2007
17:30

| Brunei | 0 – 6 | Vietnam |
|---|---|---|
| | Report | Nguyen Van Quan 10', 14'; Hoàng Văn Bình 17'; Nguyen Dinh Hiep 18', 24', 29' |

Thanh Long Sports Complex

=== Knockout stage ===
==== Bracket ====
Semi-finals
7 August – Ho Chi Minh City
Myanmar | 1
Vietnam | 3
7 August – Ho Chi Minh City
Thailand | 1
Malaysia | 2

Final
9 August – Ho Chi Minh City
Vietnam | 1
Malaysia | 0
Third place
9 August – Ho Chi Minh City
Myanmar | 0
Thailand | 2

==== Semi-finals ====
7 August 2007
15:30

| Myanmar | 1 – 3 | Vietnam |
|---|---|---|
| Naing Lin Tun 42' | Report | Nguyen Dinh Hiep 30'; Nguyen Hong Viet 41' (pen.); Pham Van Quy 82' |

Thanh Long Sports Complex
Attendance: 1,000

7 August 2007
18:30

| Thailand | 1 – 2 | Malaysia |
|---|---|---|
| Yodrak Namueangrak 81' | Report | Fakri 78'; Yusaini Che Saad 80' |

Thanh Long Sports Complex

==== Third place play-off ====
9 August 2007
15:30

| Myanmar | 0 – 2 | Thailand |
|---|---|---|
| | Report | Zoo Noo Kyaw Thuu Ray 1' (o.g.); Natthaphon Banmairurdi 70' |

Thanh Long Sports Complex

==== Final ====
9 August 2007
18:30

| Vietnam | 1 – 0 | Malaysia |
|---|---|---|
| Nguyễn Đức Nhân 6' | Report |

Thanh Long Sports Complex

== Winner ==
2007 AFF U-20 Youth Championship

Vietnam
First title

== Goalscorers ==
5 goals

- (Thailand) Kraikitti In-utane

4 goals

- (Vietnam) Nguyen Dinh Hiep

3 goals

- (Malaysia) K. Gurusamy
- (Myanmar) Pyae Phyo Oo
- (Thailand) Nirunrit Jaroensuk
- (Vietnam) Nguyen Van Quan

2 goals

- (Laos) Phoutthavong Sapackdy
- (Laos) Sayya Meungmany
- (Malaysia) Ahmad Fakri Saarani
- (Malaysia) Firdaus Azizul
- (Malaysia) Yusaini Che Saad
- (Myanmar) Kyaw Kyaw Khine
- (Thailand) Sarawut Masuk
- (Thailand) Yodrak Namueangrak
- (Vietnam) Hoàng Văn Bình
- (Vietnam) Nguyen Hong Viet

1 goal

- (Brunei) Abdul Razak Azeman
- (Brunei) Abdullehem Hayyaruzzon Meriaddin
- (Cambodia) Keo Phokphon
- (Laos) Phatthana Syvilay
- (Malaysia) Yusanee Saad
- (Malaysia) Syazwan Zainon
- (Malaysia) Abdul Shukor Jusoh
- (Malaysia) Mohd Shazlan Alias
- (Myanmar) Aung Mung Kyaw Mo
- (Myanmar) Myint Naing
- (Myanmar) Naing Lin Tun
- (Myanmar) Zin Myo Aung
- (Singapore) Gabriel Quak
- (Singapore) Ng Heng Meng Seng
- (Thailand) Attapong Nooprom
- (Thailand) Kroekrit Thaweekarn
- (Thailand) Natthaphon Banmairurdi
- (Vietnam) Tran Tan Dat
- (Vietnam) Trần Mạnh Dũng
- (Vietnam) Pham Van Guy
- (Vietnam) Nguyễn Đức Nhân

Own goal

- (Brunei) Abdul Aziz Tamit (for Thailand)
- (Cambodia) Hout Sokunthea (for Vietnam)
- (Myanmar) Zoo Noo Kyaw Thuu Ray (for Thailand)
- (Vietnam) Chu Ngọc Anh (for Thailand)
