= New Zealand men's national football team records and statistics =

This page details New Zealand men's national football team records and statistics; the most capped players, the players with the most goals and New Zealand's match record by opponent.

== Individual records ==
As of 15 November 2026
Players in bold are still active with New Zealand.

=== Most appearances ===
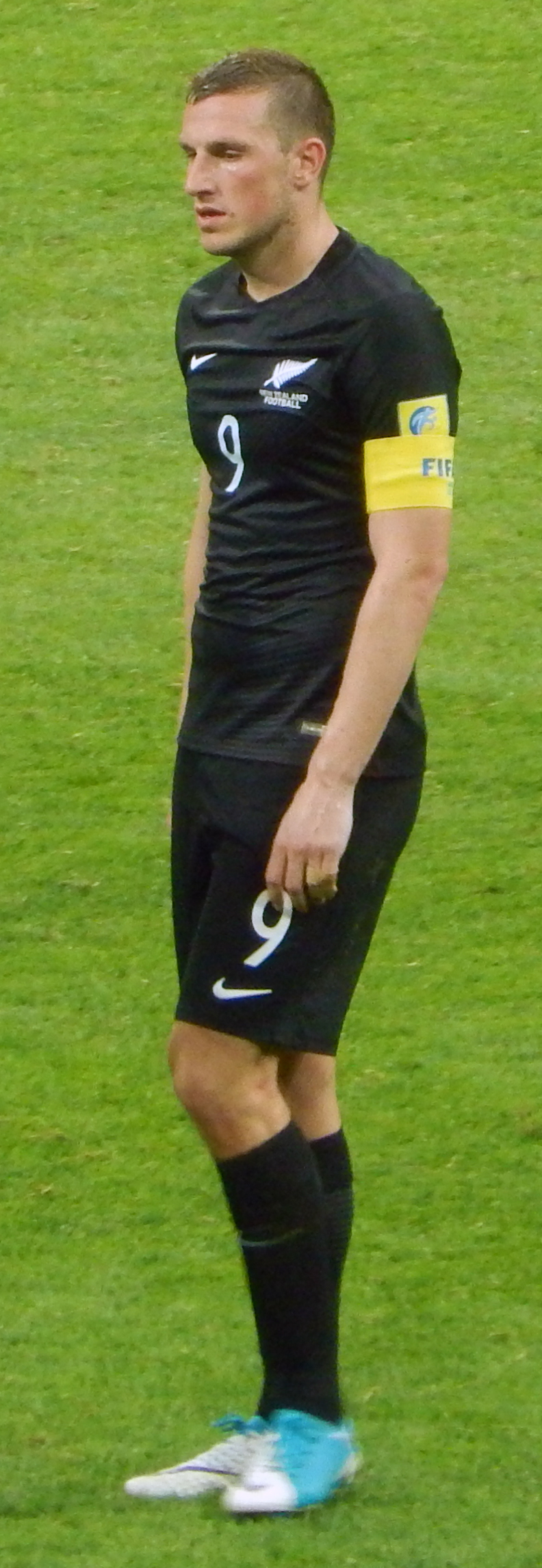
Chris Wood is New Zealand's top goalscorer and their most capped player.

Rank	Name	Caps	Goals	Position	Career
1	**Chris Wood**	97	47	FW	2009–present
2	Ivan Vicelich	88	6	DF	1995–2013
3	**Kosta Barbarouses**	76	10	FW	2008–present
4	**Michael Boxall**	70	1	DF	2011–present
5	Simon Elliott	69	6	MF	1995–2011
6	Vaughan Coveny	64	29	FW	1992–2006
7	Ricki Herbert	61	7	DF	1980–1989
8	Chris Jackson	60	10	MF	1992–2003
9	Brian Turner	59	21	MF	1967–1982
10	Duncan Cole	58	4	MF	1978–1988
10	Steve Sumner	58	22	MF	1976–1988

=== Top goalscorers ===
Rank	Player	Goals	Caps	Ratio	Career
1	**Chris Wood**	47	97	0.48	2009–present
2	Vaughan Coveny	29	64	0.45	1992–2006
3	Shane Smeltz	24	57	0.42	2003–2017
4	Steve Sumner	22	58	0.38	1976–1988
5	Brian Turner	21	59	0.36	1967–1982
6	Jock Newall	17	10	1.7	1951–1952
7	Keith Nelson	16	20	0.8	1977–1983
7	Chris Killen	16	48	0.33	2000–2013
9	Grant Turner	15	42	0.36	1980–1988
10	Wynton Rufer	12	23	0.52	1980–1997
10	Darren McClennan	12	43	0.28	1986–1997
10	**Elijah Just**	12	51	0.25	2019–present
10	Michael McGarry	12	54	0.22	1986–1997

=== Most clean sheets ===
Rank	Name	Clean sheets	Caps	Ratio	Career
1	Jason Batty	16	55	0.29	1994–2003
2	Stefan Marinovic	14	30	0.47	2015–2023
3	Mark Paston	13	36	0.36	1997–2013
4	Richard Wilson	10	26	0.38	1979–1984
5	Glen Moss	8	29	0.28	2006–2017
5	**Max Crocombe**	8	27	0.26	2018–present
7	**Alex Paulsen**	5	12	0.42	2024–present

=== Centuriate goals ===
Rank	Date	Scorer	Opponent	Score	Result
1st	17 June 1922	Ted Cook	Australia	**1**–0	3–1
100th	7 September 1958	unknown (Note: The 100th goal can still be considered unknown, as the order of who scored the goals is still unknown, but the possible authors of the 100th goal are, Bill Hume (where he scored three goals), George Cuthill and Charlie Steele Jr..)	New Caledonia	?–?	5–1
200th	20 March 1977	Keith Nelson	Taiwan	**5**–0	6–0
300th	14 December 1981	Wynton Rufer	Kuwait	**2**–1	2–2
400th	11 December 1988	Danny Halligan	Chinese Taipei	**4**–0	4–0
500th	11 June 2001	Chris Jackson	Solomon Islands	**4**–0	5–1
600th	4 June 2010	Rory Fallon	Slovenia	**1**–1	1–3
700th	30 March 2022	Chris Wood	Solomon Islands	**2**–0	5–0

=== Other records ===
Youngest player

- Ceri Evans (17 years and ninety-five days) vs. Kuwait, 16 October 1980

Oldest player

- Michael Boxall (37 years, ten months and nine days) vs. Belgium, 27 June 2026

Most goals scored in a single match

- Steve Sumner (6 goals) vs. Fiji, 16 August 1981

First goal scored

- William Foreshaw vs. New South Wales, 30 July 1904 (unofficial game)
- Ted Cook vs. Australia, 17 June 1922 (official game)

Most clean sheets

- Jason Batty (16 matches)

Most matches as a captain

Most yellow cards received

Most red cards received

=== Manager records ===
As of 21 November 2023

Most matches
60, Ricki Herbert

Most wins (total)
23, John Adshead

Most wins (one stint)
22, John Adshead
22, Ricki Herbert

Best win %
77.8, Ken Armstrong

Most major trophies
1, Anthony Hudson
1, Ricki Herbert
1, Mick Waitt
1, Ken Dugdale
1, Barrie Truman

== Team records ==
As of 21 November 2023
Biggest victory
13–0 vs. Fiji, 16 August 1981

Heaviest defeat
0–10 vs. Australia, 11 July 1936

Biggest away victory
10–0 vs. Tahiti, 4 June 2004

Biggest away defeat
0–7 vs. Uruguay, 25 June 1995

Biggest victory at the World Cup finals
None

Heaviest defeat at the World Cup finals
0–4 vs. Brazil, 23 June 1982

Biggest victory at the OFC Nations Cup finals
10–0 vs. Tahiti, 4 June 2004

First defeat to a non-Oceania team
1–2 vs. Canada, 2 July 1927

Most consecutive victories
7, 31 August 1958 vs. New Caledonia – 4 June 1962 vs. New Caledonia
7, 1 October 1978 vs. Singapore – 8 October 1979 vs. Bahrain
7, 11 October 2024 vs. Tahiti – 7 June 2025 vs. Ivory Coast

Most consecutive matches without defeat
11, 25 April 1981 vs. Australia – 7 September 1981 vs. Indonesia

Most consecutive matches without victory
16, 23 July 1927 – 19 September 1951

Most consecutive defeats
16, 23 July 1927 – 19 September 1951

Most consecutive draws
4, 15 June 2010 – 9 October 2010

Most consecutive matches without scoring
6, 5 June 2022 – 23 March 2023

Most consecutive matches without conceding a goal
10, Achieved on two occasions, most recently 3 May 1981 – 7 September 1981

=== Best / Worst Results ===
Host venue Away/Neutral venue

==== Best ====
No	Year	Opponent	Result
1	1981	Fiji	13–0
2	1987	Western Samoa	12–0
3	2004	Tahiti	10–0
4	1951	New Hebrides	9–0
4	1952	Fiji	9–0
6	2002	Papua New Guinea	9–1
7	1992	Vanuatu	8–0
7	2024	Samoa	8–0
9	1998	Vanuatu	8–1
9	2024	Vanuatu	8–1

==== Worst ====
No	Year	Opponent	Result
1	1936	Australia	0–10
2	1948	Australia	1–8
3	1948	Australia	0–7
3	1995	Uruguay	0–7
5	1936	Australia	1–7
6	1947	South Africa	0–6
6	1948	Australia	0–6
8	1947	South Africa	3–8
9	1997	Indonesia	0–5
9	2003	France	0–5
9	2007	Venezuela	0–5
9	2009	Spain	0–5

== FIFA Rankings ==
As of 18 November 2026

Best Ranking Worst Ranking Best Mover Worst Mover

New Zealand's FIFA world rankings
Rank	Year	Best		Worst	
Rank	Year	Rank	Move	Rank	Move
84	2026	84	▲4	88	▼2
87	2025	82	▲4	89	▼ —
89	2024	91	▲13	107	▼3
104	2023	100	▲5	105	▼ —
105	2022	101	▲10	111	▼1
110	2021	110	▲10	122	▼4
118	2020	118	▲3	122	▼ —
122	2019	117	▲3	122	▼5
122	2018	117	▲13	133	▼13
121	2017	95	▲17	123	▼27
109	2016	88	▲54	161	▼28
151	2015	134	▲8	159	▼12
134	2014	89	▲7	134	▼10
90	2013	55	▲30	91	▼12
91	2012	91	▲30	130	▼11
119	2011	56	▲8	119	▼37
63	2010	49	▲24	80	▼8
82	2009	77	▲17	100	▼18
86	2008	54	▲57	112	▼26
95	2007	95	▲33	156	▼27
131	2006	115	▲7	136	▼11
120	2005	96	▲ —	120	▼7
95	2004	80	▲15	95	▼5
88	2003	49	▲1	88	▼7
49	2002	47	▲41	88	▼3
84	2001	81	▲16	97	▼5
91	2000	91	▲11	108	▼5
100	1999	99	▲5	107	▼3
103	1998	100	▲31	131	▼13
120	1997	113	▲16	133	▼11
132	1996	102	▲4	136	▼19
102	1995	93	▲11	108	▼8
99	1994	77	▲2	100	▼13
77	1993	76	▲7	84	▼10
70	1992	70	▲ —	70	▼ —

== Competition records ==
=== FIFA World Cup ===
FIFA World Cup record											Qualification record						
Year	Host	Round	Pos.	Pld	W	D	L	GF	GA	Squad	Pos.	Pld	W	D	L	GF	GA
1930 to 1938		Not member of FIFA									Not member of FIFA						
1950 to 1966		Did not enter									Did not enter						
1970	Mexico	Did not qualify									2nd round	2	0	0	2	0	6
1974	West Germany	Did not qualify									1st round	6	0	3	3	5	12
1978	Argentina	Did not qualify									1st round	4	2	1	1	14	4
1982	Spain	Group stage	23rd	3	0	0	3	2	12	Squad	Qualified	15	9	5	1	44	10
1986	Mexico	Did not qualify									3rd	6	3	1	2	13	7
1990	Italy	Did not qualify									3rd	6	3	1	2	13	8
1994	United States	Did not qualify									2nd round	6	3	1	2	15	5
1998	France	Did not qualify									3rd round	6	3	0	3	13	6
2002	South Korea; Japan	Did not qualify									2nd round	6	4	0	2	20	7
2006	Germany	Did not qualify									3rd	5	3	0	2	17	5
2010	South Africa	Group stage	22nd	3	0	3	0	2	2	Squad	Qualified	8	6	1	1	15	5
2014	Brazil	Did not qualify									Play-off	13	9	1	3	28	18
2018	Russia	Did not qualify									Play-off	13	8	4	1	24	6
2022	Qatar	Did not qualify									Play-off	6	5	0	1	18	2
2026	Canada; Mexico; United States	Group stage	40th	3	0	1	2	4	10	Squad	Qualified	5	5	0	0	29	1
2030	Morocco; Portugal; Spain	To be determined									To be determined						
2034	Saudi Arabia	To be determined									To be determined						
Total		Group stage	3/23	9	0	4	5	8	24	—	—	107	63	18	26	268	102

=== OFC Nations Cup ===
New Zealand's OFC Nations Cup record
Year	Host	Round	Pos.	Pld	W	D	L	GF	GA	Squad
1973	New Zealand	Champions	1st	5	4	1	0	13	4	Squad
1980	New Caledonia	Group stage	5th	3	1	0	2	7	8	—N/a
1996		Semi-finals	3rd	2	0	1	1	0	3	Squad
1998	Australia	Champions	1st	4	4	0	0	11	1	Squad
2000	Tahiti	Runners-up	2nd	4	3	0	1	7	3	Squad
2002	New Zealand	Champions	1st	5	5	0	0	23	2	Squad
2004	Australia	Third place	3rd	5	3	0	2	17	5	Squad
2008		Champions	1st	6	5	0	1	14	5	Squad
2012	Solomon Islands	Third place	3rd	5	3	1	1	8	7	Squad
2016	Papua New Guinea	Champions	1st	5	4	1	0	10	1	Squad
2024	Fiji, Vanuatu	Champions	1st	4	4	0	0	15	0	Squad
Total		6 titles	11/11	48	36	4	8	125	39	—
Champions Runners-up Third place

=== FIFA Confederations Cup ===
FIFA Confederations Cup record
Year	Host	Round	Pld	W	D	L	GF	GA	Squad
1992	Saudi Arabia	No OFC representative invited							
1995	Saudi Arabia	No OFC representative invited							
1997	Saudi Arabia	Did not qualify							
1999	Mexico	Group stage	3	0	0	3	1	6	Squad
2001	South Korea; Japan	Did not qualify							
2003	France	Group stage	3	0	0	3	1	11	Squad
2005	Germany	Did not qualify							
2009	South Africa	Group stage	3	0	1	2	0	7	Squad
2013	Brazil	Did not qualify							
2017	Russia	Group stage	3	0	0	3	1	8	Squad
Total		Group stage	12	0	1	11	3	32	—

== Head-to-head record ==
The list shown below shows the national football team of New Zealand's all-time international record against opposing nations. The stats are composed of FIFA World Cup, FIFA Confederations Cup and, OFC Nations Cup, as well as numerous international friendly tournaments and matches.

The following tables show New Zealand's all-time international record, correct as 15 november 2026 vs. India.

=== AFC ===
Team	Pld	W	D	L	GF	GA	GD	WPCT
Australia (Note: Football Federation Australia were founder members of the Oceania Football Confederation (OFC) before joining the Asian Football Confederation in 2006.)	69	13	11	45	71	164	−93	18.84
Bahrain	6	4	1	1	6	2	+4	66.67
China	17	8	6	3	21	14	+7	47.06
Chinese Taipei (Note: Includes results as Taiwan.)	13	11	2	0	39	3	+36	84.62
India	4	3	1	0	10	1	+9	75.00
Indonesia	8	2	4	2	9	8	+1	25.00
Iran	3	0	2	1	2	5	−3	0.00
Iraq	3	0	1	2	0	6	−6	0.00
Japan	7	3	0	4	9	12	−3	42.86
Jordan	2	1	0	1	4	4	0	50.00
Kuwait	4	1	1	2	8	7	+1	25.00
Lebanon	1	0	1	0	1	1	0	0.00
Macau	1	0	1	0	1	1	0	0.00
Malaysia	13	9	2	2	32	9	+23	69.23
Myanmar (Note: Includes results as Burma.)	3	1	2	0	4	2	+2	33.33
Oman	7	4	2	1	7	4	+3	57.14
Palestine	1	0	1	0	2	2	0	0.00
Qatar	1	0	0	1	2	3	−1	0.00
Saudi Arabia	9	4	1	4	15	14	+1	44.44
Singapore	7	5	1	1	13	6	+7	71.43
South Korea	8	1	1	6	3	11	−8	12.50
South Vietnam (Note: After the reunification of Vietnam, South Vietnam's results were inherited to Vietnam.)	1	0	0	1	1	5	−4	0.00
Thailand	5	1	2	2	7	9	−2	20.00
United Arab Emirates	2	0	0	2	0	3	−3	0.00
Uzbekistan	1	0	0	1	1	3	−2	0.00
Total	196	71	43	82	268	299	−31	36.22

=== CAF ===
Team	Pld	W	D	L	GF	GA	GD	WPCT
Botswana	1	0	1	0	0	0	0	0.00
DR Congo	1	0	1	0	1	1	0	0.00
Egypt	4	0	1	3	2	6	−4	0.00
Gambia	1	1	0	0	2	0	+2	100.00
Ghana	1	1	0	0	2	0	+2	100.00
Ivory Coast	1	1	0	0	1	0	+1	100.00
Kenya	1	0	0	1	1	2	−1	0.00
Morocco	1	0	0	1	0	3	−3	0.00
South Africa	6	0	1	5	9	26	−17	0.00
Sudan	1	0	1	0	1	1	0	0.00
Tanzania	1	0	0	1	1	2	−1	0.00
Tunisia	1	0	1	0	0	0	0	0.00
Total	20	3	6	11	20	41	−21	15.00

=== CONCACAF ===
Team	Pld	W	D	L	GF	GA	GD	WPCT
Canada	7	1	1	5	5	16	−11	14.29
Costa Rica	2	0	0	2	0	5	−5	0.00
Curaçao	1	1	0	0	2	1	+1	100.00
El Salvador	1	0	1	0	2	2	0	0.00
Haiti	1	0	0	1	0	4	−4	0.00
Honduras	2	1	1	0	2	1	+1	50.00
Jamaica	2	0	0	2	3	5	−2	0.00
Mexico	8	1	0	7	9	21	−12	12.50
Panama	1	0	1	0	1	1	0	0.00
Trinidad and Tobago	1	0	1	0	0	0	0	0.00
United States	4	0	2	2	4	6	−2	0.00
Total	30	4	7	19	28	62	−34	13.33

=== CONMEBOL ===
Team	Pld	W	D	L	GF	GA	GD	WPCT
Brazil	3	0	0	3	0	10	−10	0.00
Chile	5	1	1	3	6	9	−3	20.00
Colombia	2	0	0	2	2	5	−3	0.00
Ecuador	1	0	0	1	0	2	−2	0.00
Paraguay	3	0	1	2	2	5	−3	0.00
Peru	3	0	1	2	0	3	−3	0.00
Uruguay	2	0	1	1	2	9	−7	0.00
Venezuela	1	0	0	1	0	5	−5	0.00
Total	20	1	4	15	12	48	−36	5.00

=== OFC ===
Team	Pld	W	D	L	GF	GA	GD	WPCT
Cook Islands	1	1	0	0	2	0	+2	100.00
Fiji	41	32	4	5	122	26	+96	78.05
New Caledonia	34	21	2	11	74	46	+28	61.76
Papua New Guinea	6	4	1	1	19	3	+16	66.67
Samoa (Note: Includes results as Western Samoa.)	3	3	0	0	27	0	+27	100.00
Solomon Islands	14	12	2	0	52	11	+41	85.71
Tahiti	18	14	2	2	55	13	+42	77.78
Vanuatu (Note: Includes results as New Hebrides.)	15	14	0	1	73	11	+62	93.33
Total	132	101	11	20	424	110	+314	76.52

=== UEFA ===
Team	Pld	W	D	L	GF	GA	GD	WPCT
Belarus	1	0	0	1	0	1	−1	0.00
Belgium	1	0	0	1	1	5	−4	0.00
England	3	0	0	3	0	4	−4	0.00
Estonia	2	0	1	1	3	4	−1	0.00
Finland	1	0	0	1	0	2	−2	0.00
France	1	0	0	1	0	5	−5	0.00
Georgia	1	1	0	0	3	1	+2	100.00
Germany	1	0	0	1	0	2	−2	0.00
Greece	1	0	0	1	0	2	−2	0.00
Hungary	3	0	0	3	2	6	−4	0.00
Israel (Note: The Israel Football Association was a member of the Asian Football Confederation (AFC) until it was expelled in 1974.)	8	1	1	6	5	16	−11	12.50
Italy	2	0	1	1	4	5	−1	0.00
Lithuania	1	0	0	1	0	1	−1	0.00
Northern Ireland	1	0	0	1	0	1	−1	0.00
Norway	2	0	1	1	1	4	−3	0.00
Poland	3	0	1	2	0	3	−3	0.00
Portugal	1	0	0	1	0	4	−4	0.00
Republic of Ireland	2	0	1	1	2	4	−2	0.00
Russia (Note: Includes a 3–0 loss to the Soviet Union.)	2	0	0	2	0	5	−5	0.00
Scotland	2	0	1	1	3	6	−3	0.00
Serbia	1	1	0	0	1	0	+1	100.00
Slovakia	1	0	1	0	1	1	0	0.00
Slovenia	1	0	0	1	1	3	−2	0.00
Spain	1	0	0	1	0	5	−5	0.00
Sweden	1	0	0	1	1	4	−3	0.00
Turkey	1	0	0	1	1	2	−1	0.00
Ukraine	1	0	0	1	1	2	−1	0.00
Wales	1	0	1	0	2	2	0	0.00
Total	47	3	9	35	32	100	−68	6.38

=== Full Confederation record ===
Team	Pld	W	D	L	GF	GA	GD	WPCT
AFC	196	71	43	82	268	299	−31	36.22
CAF	20	3	6	11	20	41	−21	15.00
CONCACAF	30	4	7	19	28	62	−34	13.33
CONMEBOL	20	1	4	15	12	48	−36	5.00
OFC	132	101	11	20	424	110	+314	76.52
UEFA	47	3	9	35	32	100	−68	6.38
Total	445	183	80	182	784	660	+124	41.12

== Penalty shoot-out record ==
Team	Match score (PSO score)	Status	Venue
Thailand	2–2 (3–4)	Four Nations' Cup	(Thailand) Rajamangala Stadium, 16 June 1999
Poland	0–0 (4–5)	Four Nations' Cup	(Thailand) Rajamangala Stadium, 19 June 1999
Papua New Guinea	0–0 (4–2)	OFC Nations Cup	(Papua New Guinea) Sir John Guise Stadium, 11 June 2016
Tunisia	0–0 (2–4)	FIFA Series	(Egypt) Cairo International Stadium, 26 March 2024
Panama	1–1 (5–3)	2026 Kirin Cup Soccer	(Japan) Nissan Stadium, 1 October 2026

== B team results ==
Match results and statistics of the New Zealand national football B team from its first match in 1927 until the match against Wellington Phoenix FC in 2015. This includes results under the description "New Zealand A" or "New Zealand XI":

=== Key ===
Key to matches

- Att. = Match attendance
- (H) = Home ground
- (A) = Away ground
- (N) = Neutral ground

Key to record by opponent

- Pld = Games played
- W = Games won
- D = Games drawn
- L = Games lost
- GF = Goals for
- GA = Goals against

=== B-International results ===
New Zealand B's score is shown first in each case.

New Zealand B national football team results
No.	Date	Venue	Opponents	Score	Competition	New Zealand B scorers	Att.	Ref.
1	29 June 1927	Timaru (N)	(New Zealand) South Canterbury	6–2	Friendly	Unknown	–	
2	31 July 1948	Basin Reserve, Wellington (N)	New Zealand Air Force	6–1	Friendly	Kidd (4), Sergent, Sharpe	–	
3	20 May 1961	Auckland (N)	Auckland	2–1	Friendly	Unknown	–	
4	1965	Masterton (N)	New Zealand U23	1–5	Friendly	Ferguson	–	
5	2 June 1969	Wellington (H)	English FA XI	1–7	Friendly	R. Mears	–	
6	7 June 1969	Hamilton (H)	English FA XI	0–5	Friendly		–	
7	27 January 1973	Newmarket Park, Auckland (N)	Auckland	0–5	Friendly		–	
8	5 November 1980	Deptford Road Ground, Singapore (N)	(New Zealand) Combined Services	8–1	Friendly	Unknown	–	
9	10 February 1985	Childers Road, Gisborne (N)	(New Zealand) Gisborne City	4–3	Friendly	Little (2), Sumner (2)	–	
10	8 April 1985	Porritt Stadium, Hamilton (N)	(New Zealand) Claudelands Rovers Invitation XI	5–3	Friendly	Little (2), Evans (2), Mulligan	4,500	
11	15 April 1985	Auckland (N)	(New Zealand) 1982 All Whites	2–0	Friendly	Sumner, Little	4,500	
12	17 April 1985	English Park, Christchurch (N)	(New Zealand) Canterbury Invitation	0–0	Friendly		4,500	
13	29 May 1985	Cooks Gardens, Whanganui (N)	(New Zealand) Central Region	2–0	Friendly	Deeley, Cole	1,000	
14	14 August 1985	Memorial Park, Palmerston North (N)	(New Zealand) Manawatu Selection	2–1	Friendly	Walker, Hagan	2,000	
15	29 September 1985	Mount Smart Stadium, Auckland (N)	(New Zealand) Rothmans League Selection	0–0	Friendly		–	
16	1 November 1987	Auckland (N)	(New Zealand) Northern Region U23	4–0	Friendly	Barkley (2), de Jong (2)	–	
17	1988	Christchurch (N)	(New Zealand) Christchurch United	1–2	Friendly	Unknown	–	
18	24 July 1988	Newtown Park, Wellington (N)	(New Zealand) Wellington Representative XI	3–1	Friendly	Dunford (2), McGarry	2,000	
19	21 August 1993	Subrail Park, Labasa (A)	Fiji	1–2	Friendly	Edge	5,000	
20	23 August 1993	ANZ National Stadium, Suva (A)	Fiji	1–1	Friendly	Fallon	–	
21	25 August 1993	Churchill Park, Lautoka (A)	Fiji	0–0	Friendly		6,000	
22	25 October 2006	Mỹ Đình National Stadium, Hanoi (A)	Vietnam	0–1	2006 Agribank Cup		–	
23	27 October 2006	Mỹ Đình National Stadium, Hanoi (N)	Thailand U23	0–1	2006 Agribank Cup		–	
24	29 October 2006	Mỹ Đình National Stadium, Hanoi (N)	Bahrain U21	1–0	2006 Agribank Cup	Shin	–	
25	7 February 2007	Bill McKinlay Park, Auckland (H)	Tahiti	0–0	Friendly		–	
26	9 February 2007	Douglas Track and Field, Auckland (H)	Tahiti	0–0	Friendly		–	
27	10 August 2007	Suva (A)	Fiji	2–1	Friendly	Henderson, Messam	–	
28	12 August 2007	Churchill Park, Lautoka (A)	Fiji	0–1	Friendly		3,000	
29	9 May 2010	Auckland (N)	(New Zealand) NZFC All Stars	2–0	Friendly	Barbarouses, Brockie	–	
30	25 May 2011	Auckland (N)	(New Zealand) Waitakere United	4–1	Friendly	Barbarouses, Brockie, Brown, Sigmund	–	
31	24 February 2012	Epping Stadium, Melbourne (N)	Saudi Arabia	0–6	Friendly		–	
32	4 June 2013	North Harbour Stadium, Auckland (H)	Jordan	0–1	Friendly		3,532	
33	22 September 2013	Rotorua International Stadium, Rotorua (N)	(New Zealand) Wellington Phoenix	1–1	Friendly	Clapham	3,553	
34	17 August 2014	Owen Delany Park, Taupō (N)	(New Zealand) Wellington Phoenix	2–3	Friendly	Brockie, McGlinchey	–	
35	10 May 2015	St Peter's School Grounds, Cambridge (H)	Ghana U20	0–9	Friendly		–	
36	10 May 2015	Yarrow Stadium, New Plymouth (H)	(New Zealand) Wellington Phoenix	2–1	Friendly	Fenton, Rufer	–	

=== Results by year ===
Per Decade
Year	Pld	W	D	L	GF	GA	GD
1920–1929	1	1	0	0	6	2	+4
1940–1949	1	1	0	0	6	1	+5
1960–1969	4	1	0	3	4	23	–19
1970–1979	1	0	0	1	0	5	–5
1980–1989	11	8	2	1	31	11	+20
1990–1999	3	0	2	1	2	3	–1
2000–2009	7	2	2	3	3	4	–1
2010–2019	7	3	1	4	11	22	–11
2020–2029	50	22	8	20	94	52	+42
