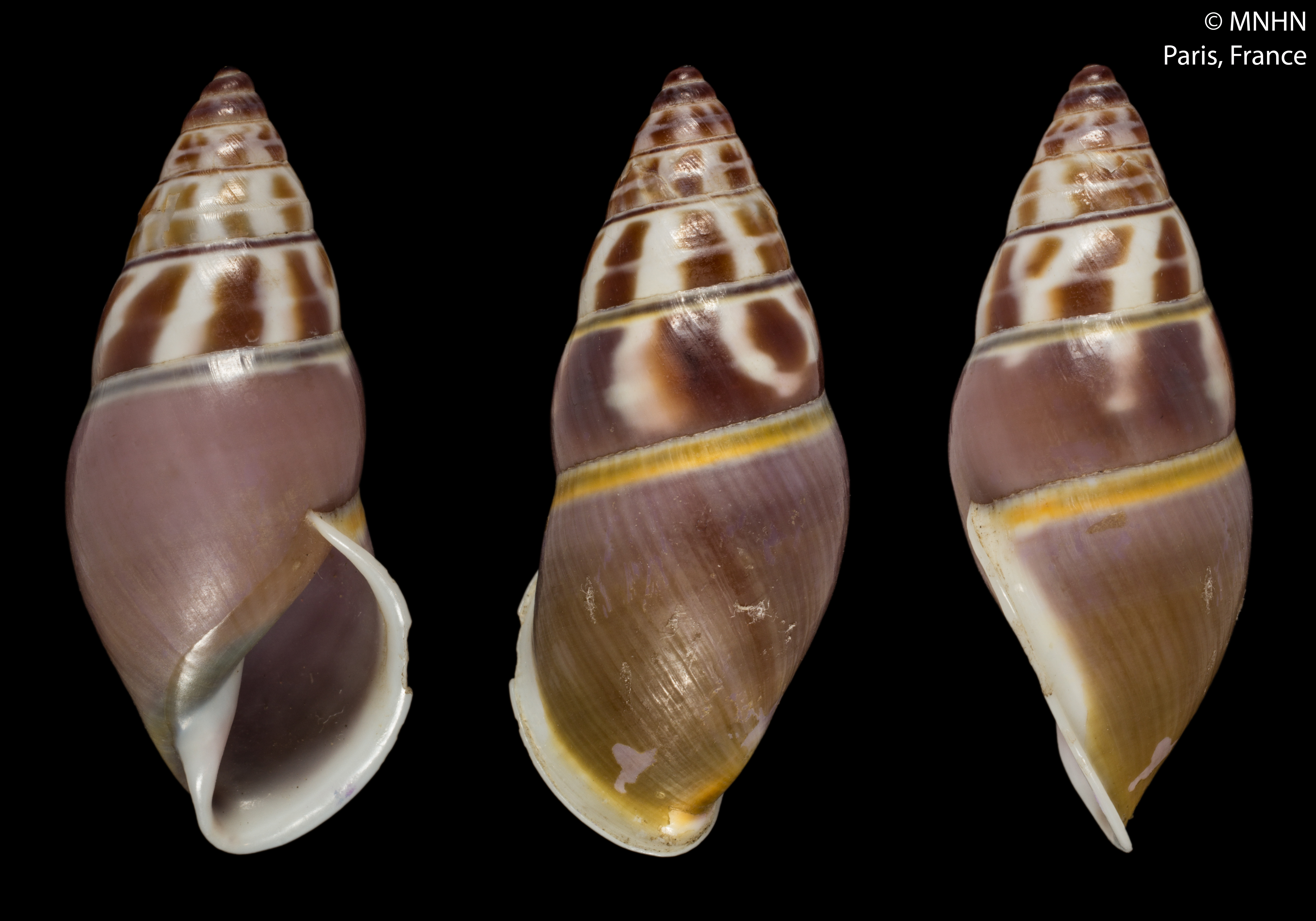
- Shell of Amphidromus hongdaoae (holotype at MNHN, Paris)

Scientific classification
- Kingdom: Animalia
- Phylum: Mollusca
- Class: Gastropoda
- Order: Stylommatophora
- Family: Camaenidae
- Genus: Amphidromus
- Species: A. hongdaoae

Binomial name
- Amphidromus hongdaoae Thach, 2017

= Amphidromus hongdaoae =

Species of snail in the family Camaenidae

Amphidromus hongdaoae is a species of medium-sized air-breathing tree snail, an arboreal gastropod mollusk in the family Camaenidae.

Subspecies

- Amphidromus hongdaoae hongdaoae Thach, 2017
- Amphidromus hongdaoae vuanhae Thach, 2021

== Habitat ==
This species lives in trees.

== Distribution ==
The type locality of this species is Phu Thien District, Gia Lai Province, Vietnam
