= Ngô Hoàng Thịnh =

Vietnamese footballer

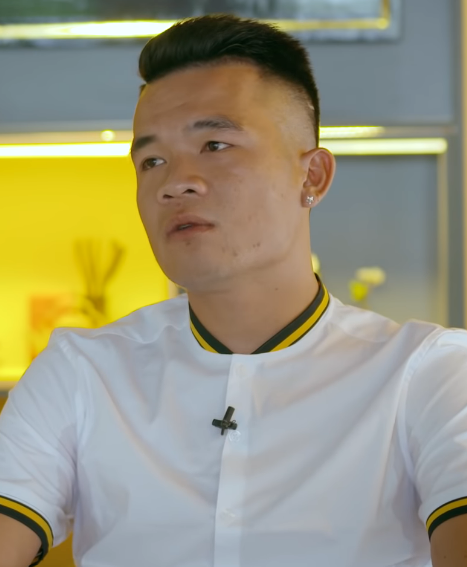
- Hoàng Thịnh in 2019

Personal information
- Full name: Ngô Hoàng Thịnh
- Date of birth: April 21, 1992 (age 34)
- Place of birth: Vinh, Nghệ An, Vietnam
- Height: 1.77 m (5 ft 10 in)
- Positions: Defensive midfielder; right midfielder

Youth career
- 2004–2011: Sông Lam Nghệ An

Senior career*
Years	Team	Apps	(Gls)
2011–2015	Sông Lam Nghệ An	88	(4)
2016–2018	FLC Thanh Hoá	45	(4)
2019–2022	Hồ Chí Minh City	63	(6)
2023	Thép Xanh Nam Định	10	(0)

International career^{‡}
2009–2010	Vietnam U19	31	(4)
2010–2012	Vietnam U21	8	(2)
2011–2013	Vietnam U23	3	(1)
2014–2017	Vietnam	15	(2)
- * Club domestic league appearances and goals as of 21 July 2018 ‡ National team caps and goals as of 22 November 2014

Ngô Hoàng Thịnh (born April 21, 1992 in Nghệ An) is a Vietnamese footballer who plays as a midfielder for Vietnamese club and the Vietnamese national team. He has captained Vietnam youth sides on numerous occasions.

Hoang Thinh was nominated for the title of Best Young Player of Vietnam Football Federation 4 times in a row but never actually won. He has won many trophies with Sông Lam Nghệ An at youth national tournaments level including: U11, U12, U15, U17, U21. In 2011, at the age of 19, he won the V-League and the Vietnamese National Cup runners-up title with Sông Lam Nghệ An.

== Club career ==
=== FLC Thanh Hóa ===
Hoang Thinh signed a 3-year deal with FLC Thanh Hóa in November 2015.

== International career ==
On 15 September 2014, Vietnam beat Iran 4-1 in shock win in the men's football event of the 2014 Asian Games. Considered the underdogs in this clash, Vietnam U23 stun the tournament favourite as Hoang Thinh, the captain scored an indirect free-kick late in the game.

=== International goals ===
Scores and results list Vietnam's goal tally first.

==== Under-19 ====
#	Date	Venue	Opponent	Score	Result	Competition
1.	2 October 2009	Vientiane, New Laos National Stadium	Laos	1–0	2–2	Friendly
2.	18 October 2009	Bình Dương, Gò Đậu Stadium	China	1–2	2–4	2009 Thanh Nien Cup
3.	1 November 2009	Bangkok, Thai-Japanese Stadium	Laos	4–0	4–1	2010 AFC U-19 Championship qualification
4.	30 July 2010	Ho Chi Minh City, Thống Nhất Stadium	South Korea	1–1	1–1	2010 AFF U-19 Youth Championship

==== Under-21 ====
#	Date	Venue	Opponent	Score	Result	Competition
1.	13 October 2012	Pleiku, Pleiku Stadium	Singapore	3–0	6–1	2012 Thanh Nien Cup
2.	17 October 2012	Pleiku, Pleiku Stadium	Thailand	2–0	2–0	2012 Thanh Nien Cup

==== Under-23 ====
#	Date	Venue	Opponent	Score	Result	Competition
1.	28 June 2012	Yangon, Thuwunna Stadium	Philippines	4–0	9–0	2013 AFC U-22 Championship qualification
2.	28 June 2012	Yangon, Thuwunna Stadium	Philippines	5–0	9–0	2013 AFC U-22 Championship qualification
3.	10 September 2014	Incheon, Incheon Munhak Stadium	Bangladesh	2–0	4–2	Friendly
4.	10 September 2014	Incheon, Incheon Munhak Stadium	Bangladesh	3–0	4–2	Friendly
5.	15 September 2014	Ansan, Ansan Wa~ Stadium	Iran	4–1	4–1	2014 Asian Games

==== Vietnam ====
Scores and results list Vietnam's goal tally first.

#	Date	Venue	Opponent	Score	Result	Competition
1.	16 November 2014	Mỹ Đình National Stadium, Hanoi, Vietnam	Malaysia	3–1	3–1	Friendly
2.	28 November 2014	Mỹ Đình National Stadium, Hanoi, Vietnam	Philippines	1–0	3–1	2014 AFF Championship

== Honours ==
Sông Lam Nghệ An

- V.League 1: 2011
- Vietnamese National Cup: Runner-up 2011

FLC Thanh Hóa

- V.League 1: Runner-up: 2017, 2018
- Vietnamese National Cup: Runner-up 2018

Hồ Chí Minh City

- V.League 1: Runner-up: 2020
- Vietnamese Super Cup: Runner-up: 2020

Vietnam U19

- International U-21 Thanh Niên Newspaper Cup: 2010
- International U-21 Thanh Niên Newspaper Cup: Runner-up 2009

Vietnam U21

- International U-21 Thanh Niên Newspaper Cup: 2011
- International U-21 Thanh Niên Newspaper Cup: Runner-up 2012

Vietnam U23

- VFF Cup: Runner-up 2011
- BTV Cup: Runner-up 2013
