= Nguyễn Văn Thắng =

Nguyễn Văn Thắng may refer to:

- Nguyễn Văn Thắng (footballer)
- Nguyễn Văn Thắng (politician)
- Jean-Baptiste Chaigneau, French sailor and adventurer who took the Vietnamese name Nguyễn Văn Thắng

== See also ==
- Nguyễn Văn Thành, Vietnamese general
