= List of international goals scored by Chris Wood =

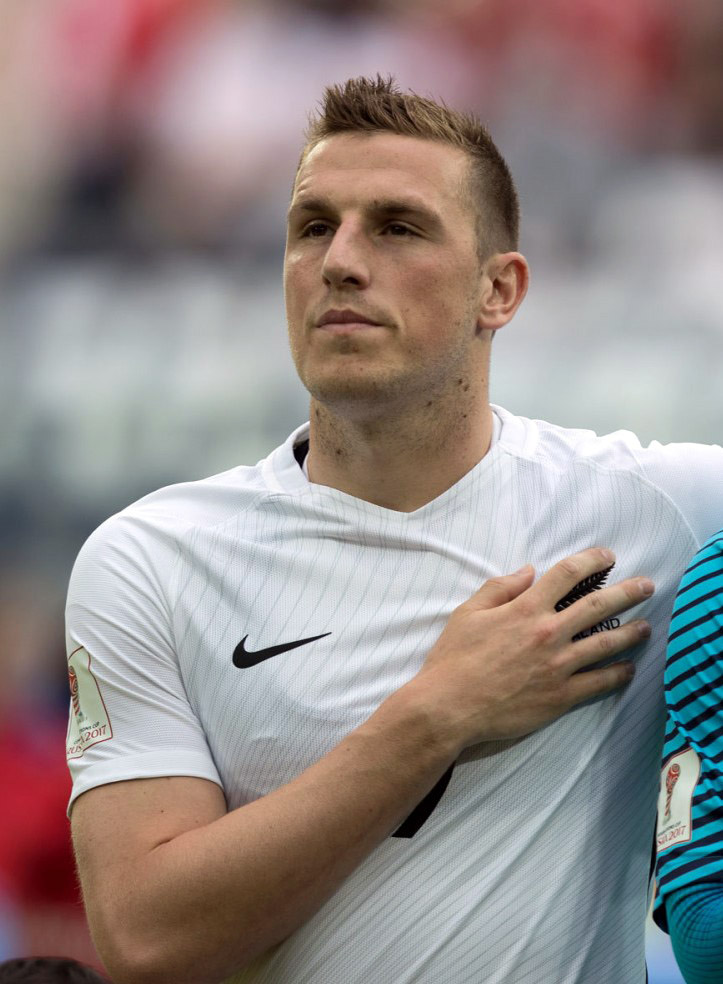
Wood with New Zealand at the 2017 FIFA Confederations Cup

Chris Wood is a New Zealand professional footballer who has represented the New Zealand national team (nicknamed the "All Whites") since 2009. With 47 goals, he is New Zealand's all-time leading goalscorer.

== Youth goals ==
Scores and results list Chris Wood's team's goal tally first.

All youth international goals scored by Chris Wood
No.	Team	Cap	Date	Venue	Opponent	Score	Result	Competition	Ref.
1	New Zealand U17		17 July 2007	Niigata, Japan	Japan U17	–	1–2	Friendly	
2	New Zealand U23		29 July 2012	Old Trafford, Manchester, England	Egypt U23	1–0	1–1	2012 Summer Olympics	
3	New Zealand Olympic (O.P.)		12 July 2021	ZA Oripri Stadium, Ichihara, Japan	Australia U23	1–0‡	2–0	Friendly	
4	New Zealand Olympic (O.P.)		22 July 2021	Kashima Stadium, Kashima, Japan	South Korea U23	1–0	1–0	2020 Summer Olympics	
5	New Zealand Olympic (O.P.)		25 July 2021	Kashima Stadium, Kashima, Japan	Honduras U23	1–0	2–3	2020 Summer Olympics	

== Goals ==
As of match played 15 November 2026

Scores and results list New Zealand's goal tally first.

Key
‡	Indicates goal was scored from a penalty kick
	Indicates New Zealand won the match
	Indicates the match ended in a draw
	Indicates New Zealand lost the match

List of international goals scored by Chris Wood
No.	Cap	Date	Venue	Opponent	Score	Result	Competition	Ref.
1	13	9 October 2010	North Harbour Stadium, Auckland, New Zealand	Honduras	1–0	1–1	Friendly	
2	18	29 February 2012	Mount Smart Stadium, Auckland, New Zealand	Jamaica	1–2	2–3	Friendly	
3	22	4 June 2012	Lawson Tama Stadium, Honiara, Solomon Islands	Papua New Guinea	2–0	2–1	2012 OFC Nations Cup	
4	23	6 June 2012	Lawson Tama Stadium, Honiara, Solomon Islands	Solomon Islands	1–0	1–1	2012 OFC Nations Cup	
5	25	10 June 2012	Lawson Tama Stadium, Honiara, Solomon Islands	Solomon Islands	1–0	4–3	2012 OFC Nations Cup	
6	25	10 June 2012	Lawson Tama Stadium, Honiara, Solomon Islands	Solomon Islands	2–0	4–3	2012 OFC Nations Cup	
7	25	10 June 2012	Lawson Tama Stadium, Honiara, Solomon Islands	Solomon Islands	3–0	4–3	2012 OFC Nations Cup	
8	26	7 September 2012	Stade Numa-Daly Magenta, Nouméa, New Caledonia	New Caledonia	2–0	2–0	2014 FIFA World Cup qualification	
9	27	11 September 2012	North Harbour Stadium, Auckland, New Zealand	Solomon Islands	5–1	6–1	2014 FIFA World Cup qualification	
10	29	14 November 2012	Hongkou Football Stadium, Shanghai, China	China	1–1	1–1	Friendly	
11	34	5 March 2014	National Stadium, Tokyo, Japan	Japan	1–4	2–4	2014 Kirin Challenge Cup	
12	34	5 March 2014	National Stadium, Tokyo, Japan	Japan	2–4	2–4	2014 Kirin Challenge Cup	
13	36	14 November 2014	Nanchang Bayi Stadium, Nanchang, China	China	1–1	1–1	Friendly	
14	39	12 November 2015	Al-Seeb Stadium, Muscat, Oman	Oman	1–0	1–0	Friendly	
15	40	28 May 2016	Sir John Guise Stadium, Port Moresby, Papua New Guinea	Fiji	3–1‡	3–1	2016 OFC Nations Cup	
16	41	31 May 2016	Sir John Guise Stadium, Port Moresby, Papua New Guinea	Vanuatu	1–0	5–0	2016 OFC Nations Cup	
17	41	31 May 2016	Sir John Guise Stadium, Port Moresby, Papua New Guinea	Vanuatu	2–0	5–0	2016 OFC Nations Cup	
18	42	8 June 2016	Sir John Guise Stadium, Port Moresby, Papua New Guinea	New Caledonia	1–0	1–0	2016 OFC Nations Cup	
19	47	25 March 2017	Churchill Park, Lautoka, Fiji	Fiji	1–0‡	2–0	2018 FIFA World Cup qualification	
20	51	21 June 2017	Fisht Olympic Stadium, Sochi, Russia	Mexico	1–0	1–2	2017 FIFA Confederations Cup	
21	53	1 September 2017	North Harbour Stadium, Auckland, New Zealand	Solomon Islands	1–0	6–1	2018 FIFA World Cup qualification	
22	53	1 September 2017	North Harbour Stadium, Auckland, New Zealand	Solomon Islands	2–0	6–1	2018 FIFA World Cup qualification	
23	53	1 September 2017	North Harbour Stadium, Auckland, New Zealand	Solomon Islands	6–1	6–1	2018 FIFA World Cup qualification	
24	54	6 October 2017	Toyota Stadium, Toyota, Japan	Japan	1–1	1–2	2017 Kirin Challenge Cup	
25	58	9 October 2021	Bahrain National Stadium, Riffa, Bahrain	Curaçao	2–0	2–1	Friendly	
26	60	16 November 2021	Zayed Sports City Stadium, Abu Dhabi, United Arab Emirates	Gambia	1–0	2–0	Friendly	
27	60	16 November 2021	Zayed Sports City Stadium, Abu Dhabi, United Arab Emirates	Gambia	2–0	2–0	Friendly	
28	61	28 January 2022	New York University Stadium, Abu Dhabi, United Arab Emirates	Jordan	1–1‡	1–3	Friendly	
29	62	21 March 2022	Qatar SC Stadium, Doha, Qatar	Fiji	1–0	4–0	2022 FIFA World Cup qualification	
30	62	21 March 2022	Qatar SC Stadium, Doha, Qatar	Fiji	3–0	4–0	2022 FIFA World Cup qualification	
31	63	24 March 2022	Qatar SC Stadium, Doha, Qatar	New Caledonia	6–1	7–1	2022 FIFA World Cup qualification	
32	63	24 March 2022	Qatar SC Stadium, Doha, Qatar	New Caledonia	7–1	7–1	2022 FIFA World Cup qualification	
33	65	30 March 2022	Al-Arabi Stadium, Doha, Qatar	Solomon Islands	2–0	5–0	2022 FIFA World Cup qualification	
34	71	13 October 2023	Estadio Nueva Condomina, Murcia, Spain	DR Congo	1–1‡	1–1	Friendly	
35	77	11 October 2024	VFF Freshwater Stadium, Port Vila, Vanuatu	Tahiti	2–0	3–0	2026 FIFA World Cup qualification	
36	78	14 October 2024	North Harbour Stadium, Auckland, New Zealand	Malaysia	3–0	4–0	Friendly	
37	79	15 November 2024	Waikato Stadium, Hamilton, New Zealand	Vanuatu	2–1	8–1	2026 FIFA World Cup qualification	
38	79	15 November 2024	Waikato Stadium, Hamilton, New Zealand	Vanuatu	3–1	8–1	2026 FIFA World Cup qualification	
39	80	18 November 2024	Mount Smart Stadium, Auckland, New Zealand	Samoa	2–0	8–0	2026 FIFA World Cup qualification	
40	80	18 November 2024	Mount Smart Stadium, Auckland, New Zealand	Samoa	3–0	8–0	2026 FIFA World Cup qualification	
41	80	18 November 2024	Mount Smart Stadium, Auckland, New Zealand	Samoa	4–0	8–0	2026 FIFA World Cup qualification	
42	81	21 March 2025	Sky Stadium, Wellington, New Zealand	Fiji	1–0	7–0	2026 FIFA World Cup qualification	
43	81	21 March 2025	Sky Stadium, Wellington, New Zealand	Fiji	5–0	7–0	2026 FIFA World Cup qualification	
44	81	21 March 2025	Sky Stadium, Wellington, New Zealand	Fiji	6–0	7–0	2026 FIFA World Cup qualification	
45	86	9 September 2025	Mount Smart Stadium, Auckland, New Zealand	Australia	1–2	1–3	2025 Soccer Ashes	
46	96	12 November 2026	Mount Smart Stadium, Auckland, New Zealand	India	4–0	5–0	Friendly	
47	97	15 November 2026	One New Zealand Stadium, Christchurch, New Zealand	India	3–0	3–0	Friendly	

== Hat-tricks ==
No.	Date	Venue	Opponent	Goals	Result	Competition
1	10 June 2012	Lawson Tama Stadium, Honiara, Solomon Islands	Solomon Islands	3 – (10', 24', 29')	4–3	2012 OFC Nations Cup
2	1 September 2017	North Harbour Stadium, Auckland, New Zealand	Solomon Islands	3 – (18', 36', 90+3')	6–1	2018 FIFA World Cup qualification
3	18 November 2024	Mount Smart Stadium, Auckland, New Zealand	Samoa	3 – (28', 34', 60')	8–0	2026 FIFA World Cup qualification
4	21 March 2025	Sky Stadium, Wellington, New Zealand	Fiji	3 – (8', 56', 60')	7–0	2026 FIFA World Cup qualification

== Statistics ==
As of match played 15 November 2026

Appearances and goals by year and competition
Year	Competitive		Friendly		Total	
Year	Apps	Goals	Apps	Goals	Apps	Goals
2009	3	0	2	0	5	0
2010	3	0	6	1	9	1
2011	—		3	0	3	0
2012	8	7	4	2	12	9
2013	2	0	2	0	4	0
2014	—		4	3	4	3
2015	—		2	1	2	1
2016	5	4	2	0	7	4
2017	7	5	3	1	10	6
2018	—		—		0	0
2019	—		1	0	1	0
2020	—		—		0	0
2021	—		3	3	3	3
2022	5	5	5	1	10	6
2023	—		4	1	4	1
2024	3	6	3	1	6	7
2025	2	3	6	1	8	4
2026	3	0	6	2	9	2
Total	41	30	56	17	97	47

Appearances and goals by competition
Competition	Apps	Goals
FIFA World Cup	6	0
FIFA Confederations Cup	4	1
Friendlies	56	17
FIFA World Cup qualification	23	20
OFC Nations Cup	8	9
Total	97	47

Goals by opponent
Opponent	Goals
Solomon Islands	9
Fiji	7
New Caledonia	4
Vanuatu	4
Japan	3
Samoa	3
China	2
Gambia	2
India	2
Australia	1
Curaçao	1
DR Congo	1
Honduras	1
Jamaica	1
Jordan	1
Malaysia	1
Mexico	1
Oman	1
Papua New Guinea	1
Tahiti	1
Total	47

== See also ==
- List of top international men's football goal scorers by country
- New Zealand men's national football team records and statistics
