= 2010 AFF U-19 Youth Championship =

AFF U19 Preparatory Championship 2010

Tournament details
- Host country: Vietnam
- City: Ho Chi Minh City
- Dates: 24–30 July
- Teams: 4 (from 1 confederation)
- Venue: 1 (in 1 host city)

Final positions
- Champions: Australia (3rd title)
- Runners-up: Thailand
- Third place: South Korea
- Fourth place: Vietnam

Tournament statistics
- Matches played: 8
- Goals scored: 15 (1.88 per match)
- Top scorer(s): (Vietnam) Nguyen Van Thanh (3 goals)

The 2010 AFF U-19 Youth Championship was held from 24 to 30 July 2010, hosted by Vietnam. Only four teams will be participating, two teams from member associations of the AFF along with associate member Australia, and an invitee team from the East Asian Football Federation (EAFF).

== Tournament ==
All times are Indochina Time (ICT) – UTC+7

=== Group stage ===
Team	Pld	W	D	L	GF	GA	GD	Pts
Australia	3	2	1	0	6	2	+4	7
Thailand	3	0	3	0	2	2	0	3
South Korea	3	0	2	1	1	2	−1	2
Vietnam	3	0	2	1	3	6	−3	2

24 July 2010
16:00

Australia	1–0	South Korea
Petratos 23'	Report

Thong Nhat Stadium, Ho Chi Minh City

24 July 2010
18:30

Vietnam	1–1	Thailand
Thạnh 76'	Report	Natthawut 49'

Thong Nhat Stadium, Ho Chi Minh City

26 July 2010
16:00

Thailand	1–1	Australia
Pattana 71'	Report	Hamill 4'

Thong Nhat Stadium, Ho Chi Minh City

26 July 2010
18:30

South Korea	1–1	Vietnam
Lee Ki-je 58'	Report	Thạnh 90+'

Thong Nhat Stadium, Ho Chi Minh City

28 July 2010
16:00

South Korea	0–0	Thailand
	Report

Thong Nhat Stadium, Ho Chi Minh City

28 July 2010
18:30

Vietnam	1–4	Australia
Thạnh 57'	Report	Amini 1'; Leckie 14'; Halloran 40'; Babalj 73'

Thong Nhat Stadium, Ho Chi Minh City

=== Third place play-off ===
30 July 2010
16:00

Vietnam	1–1	South Korea
Thịnh 51'	Report	Kim Ryun-do 9'
Penalties
Bảo (penalty scored); Thịnh (penalty scored); Nam (penalty scored); Tú (penalty scored); Phương (penalty scored); Ngọ (penalty scored); Quang (penalty missed)	6–7	(penalty scored) Lee Jong-ho; (penalty scored) Kim Young-wook; (penalty scored) Choi Seung-keun; (penalty scored) Lee Ki-je; (penalty scored) Jang Hyung-soo; (penalty scored) Lee Jae-gwan; (penalty scored) Kim Young-nam

Thong Nhat Stadium, Ho Chi Minh City

=== Final ===
30 July 2010
18:00

Australia	1–0	Thailand
Babalj 81'	Report

Thong Nhat Stadium, Ho Chi Minh City

== Winner ==
2010 AFF U-19 Youth Championship winners

Australia
Third title

== Awards ==
Fair Play Award
South Korea

== Goalscorers ==
3 goals

- (Vietnam) Nguyễn Văn Thạnh

2 goals

- (Australia) Eli Babalj

1 goal

- (Australia) Mustafa Amini
- (Australia) Benjamin Halloran
- (Australia) Brendan Hamill
- (Australia) Mathew Leckie
- (Australia) Dimitri Petratos
- (South Korea) Kim Ryun Do
- (South Korea) Lee Ki-Je
- (Thailand) Natthawut Khamrin
- (Thailand) Pattana Sokjoho
- (Vietnam) Ngô Hoàng Thịnh
