= Lê Hoàng Thiên =

Vietnamese footballer (born 1990)

Personal information
- Full name: Lê Hoàng Thiên
- Date of birth: 25 December 1990 (age 35)
- Place of birth: Phú Thiện, Gia Lai, Vietnam
- Height: 1.73 m (5 ft 8 in)
- Position: Attacking midfielder

Youth career
- 2001–2004: Thành Long Football Centre
- 2005–2010: HAGL – Arsenal JMG Academy

Senior career*
Years	Team	Apps	(Gls)
2011–2015	Hoàng Anh Gia Lai	89	(12)
2016–2017	SHB Đà Nẵng	20	(2)
2017–2018	Sài Gòn	42	(10)
2019–2020	Hồ Chí Minh City	12	(4)
2020–2021	Bình Định	7	(1)

International career
2011–2013	Vietnam U23	24	(6)
2016–2017	Vietnam	2	(0)
- * Club domestic league appearances and goals as of 17 April 2019

Lê Hoàng Thiên (born 25 December 1990) is a Vietnamese footballer who plays as an attacking midfielder for V.League 1 club Bình Định.

== Personal life ==
Hoàng Thiên was born in Phú Thiện. On 27 May 2014 he was married to Dương Thị Ngọc Nguyệt, a nurse at the local hospital. Hoàng Thiên is known for being a devout Christian who attends church weekly and was humorously known as "Người con của Chúa" (Son of God) by his team mates. He has a tattoo of a Christian cross on his left arm and a bible verse on his right.

== Club career ==
Despite spending his whole career at that point with his home town club Hoàng Anh Gia Lai, after the end of the 2015 season Hoàng Thiên signed a two-year contract with SHB Đà Nẵng. Hoàng Thiên explained that although Hoàng Anh Gia Lai could pay him a higher salary he felt that Da Nang was the right city to raise a family and be comfortable. After failing to break into the Da Nang squad for much of the 2017 season Hoàng Thiên moved to Sài Gòn F.C. in early May of that year.
