= Phú Thiện =

- Commune
- Interactive map of Phú Thiện
- Coordinates: 13.522061448062015°N 108.31279801805076°E
- Country: Vietnam
- Region: South Central Coast and Central Highlands
- Province: Gia Lai
- Established: 2025

Area
  - Total: 262.87 km^{2} (101.49 sq mi)

Population (31 December 2024)
  - Total: 49,393
  - Density: 187/km^{2} (480/sq mi)
- Website: phuthien.gialai.gov.vn

Phú Thiện is a commune in Gia Lai province, Vietnam.

On 16 June 2025, the Standing Committee of the National Assembly of Vietnam issued Resolution No. 1664/NQ-UBTVQH15 on the arrangement of commune-level administrative units in Gia Lai province in 2025. Under the resolution, the entire area and population of Phú Thiện township, Ia Sol, Ia Yeng, and Ia Piar communes, formerly part of Phú Thiện district, were merged to form a new commune named Phú Thiện.
