= VFF Cup =

Vietnames football tournament

VFF Vietnam International Friendly Cup
- Organiser(s): VFF
- Founded: 19 August 2004
- Region: Vietnam
- Teams: 3 or 4
- Current champions: Kyrgyzstan (1st title)
- Most championships: Vietnam U-23 (3 titles)
- 2026 Casper Cup

The VFF Cup is a football tournament organised by the Vietnam Football Federation. Every year, the tournament is regularly held in Vietnam with other foreign participants are either club teams or national teams, while the host send their national team or youth national team to compete.

== History ==
The predecessor of VFF Cup was the Independence Cup, held in 1995, 1997 and 1998.

In 2004, the tournament was rebranded to Agribank Cup until 2011 as a replacement to the Independence Cup. In 2008, it was renamed due to the withdrawal of the Vietnam Bank for Agriculture and Rural Development (Agribank) as the main sponsor. In 2012, Vietnam Football Federation (VFF) announced that the competition would no longer be played. It was then revived again in 2018 as Vinaphone Cup following the new sponsorship from Vietnam Posts and Telecommunications Group (VNPT).

The 2021 edition was cancelled due to the COVID-19 pandemic in Vietnam before being held again in 2022.

== Summary ==
=== Independance Cup ===
Year
Year	Winner	Second Place	Third Place	Fourth Place
1995	(South Korea) Housing & Commercial Bank	(China) Bayi	Vietnam B	Vietnam
1997	(Denmark) Herfølge	(South Korea) E-Land Puma	Vietnam Olympic	(Vietnam) Ho Chi Minh City XI
1998	(Sweden) Halmstads BK	(South Korea) Ulsan	(Vietnam) Ho Chi Minh City XI	Johor

=== VFF Cup ===
Year
Year	Winner	Second Place	Third Place	Fourth Place
2004	(Portugal) Porto B	Vietnam	(Brazil) Santa Cruz	Thailand PL XI
2005	Vietnam U-23	Thailand U-23	Japan U-20	Malaysia U-23
2006	Thailand	Vietnam	New Zealand A	Bahrain U-21
2007	Uzbekistan U-23	Finland U-23	Vietnam U-23	Zimbabwe U-23
2008	Thailand	Vietnam	North Korea	
2009	Vietnam U-23	China U-23	Thailand U-23	Singapore U-23
2010	North Korea	Singapore	South Korea Uni. Selection	Vietnam
2011	Uzbekistan U-23	Vietnam U-23	Malaysia U-23	Myanmar U-23
2012	South Korea Uni. Selection	Turkmenistan	Vietnam	Laos
2018	Vietnam U-23	Palestine U-23	Uzbekistan U-23	Oman U-23
2021	Cancelled due to COVID-19 pandemic			
2022	Vietnam	India	Singapore	
September 2024	Not finished due to Typhoon Yagi			
October 2024	Cancelled due to Lebanon pulling out following the 2024 Israeli invasion of Lebanon			
2026	Kyrgyzstan	Vietnam	Chinese Taipei	

== Edition details ==
=== 2004 Results ===
For the first edition of the Agribank Cup Vietnam hosted the Porto Reserve team from Portugal, Santa Cruz F.C. from Brazil and the Thailand XI selection team, consisting of players from the Thailand Premier League. For this tournament the Football Association of Thailand (FAT) refused to send one of its national teams to take part, instead they sent a 'Selection Team' after the VFF insisted on Thailand's participation. The tournament lasted four days from 22 to 26 September 2004. The guest team from Portugal won the Agribank Cup after three consecutive victories and was awarded $30,000, host nation Vietnam was awarded $20,000 finishing as runners up and Santa Cruz pocketed $5,000 finishing third.

Team	Pld	W	D	L	GF	GA	GD	Pts
Porto B	3	3	0	0	4	1	+3	9
Vietnam	3	2	0	1	4	3	+1	6
Santa Cruz	3	1	0	2	5	2	+3	3
Thailand XI	3	0	0	3	1	8	−7	0

22 September 2004
Porto B (Portugal)	1–0	(Brazil) Santa Cruz	Mỹ Đình Stadium	Details
22 September 2004
Vietnam	2–1	Thailand XI	Mỹ Đình Stadium	Details
24 September 2004
Porto B (Portugal)	1–0	Thailand XI	Mỹ Đình Stadium	Details
24 September 2004
Vietnam	1–0	(Brazil) Santa Cruz	Mỹ Đình Stadium	Details
26 September 2004
Santa Cruz (Brazil)	5–0	Thailand XI	Mỹ Đình Stadium	Details
26 September 2004
Vietnam	1–2	(Portugal) Porto B	Mỹ Đình Stadium	Details

=== 2005 Results ===
For the second tournament host nation Vietnam entered its Olympic team to compete against Olympic teams from Malaysia and Thailand as well as Japan's U-20 team. The tournament lasted from 26 to 30 October 2005. Following three consecutive victories Vietnam's team clinched the Agribank Cup with $40,000 in prize money, while Thailand and Japan took home $20,000 each after finishing second and third place respectively.

Team	Pld	W	D	L	GF	GA	GD	Pts
Vietnam	3	3	0	0	5	2	+3	9
Thailand	3	2	0	1	4	2	+2	6
Japan U-20	3	1	0	2	5	4	+1	3
Malaysia	3	0	0	3	0	6	−6	0

26 October 2005
Thailand	2–0	Japan U-20	Mỹ Đình Stadium	Details
26 October 2005
Vietnam	1–0	Malaysia	Mỹ Đình Stadium	Details
28 October 2005
Vietnam	2–1	Thailand	Mỹ Đình Stadium	Details
28 October 2005
Japan U-20	4–0	Malaysia	Mỹ Đình Stadium	Details
30 October 2005
Thailand	1–0	Malaysia	Mỹ Đình Stadium	Details
30 October 2005
Japan U-20	1–2	Vietnam	Mỹ Đình Stadium	Details

=== 2006 Results ===
The third edition of the Agribank Cup lasted from 25 to 29 October 2006. The VFF initially invited teams from Bahrain, Iceland and Thailand to participate in the tournament, but due to Iceland's withdrawal a team from New Zealand was invited to fill the void instead.

For this tournament host nation Vietnam and Thailand both entered a near full-strength team, New Zealand sent the B-team called New Zealand "A", while Bahrain used their under-21 squad.

Team	Pld	W	D	L	GF	GA	GD	Pts
Thailand	3	2	1	0	6	2	+4	7
Vietnam	3	2	1	0	5	2	+3	7
New Zealand	3	1	0	2	1	2	−1	3
Bahrain U-21	3	0	0	3	0	6	−6	0

25 October 2006
Thailand	3–0	Bahrain U-21	Mỹ Đình Stadium	Details
25 October 2006
Vietnam	1–0	New Zealand A	Mỹ Đình Stadium	Details
27 October 2006
Thailand	1–0	New Zealand A	Mỹ Đình Stadium	Details
27 October 2006
Vietnam	2–0	Bahrain U-21	Mỹ Đình Stadium	Details
29 October 2006
Bahrain U-21	0–1	New Zealand A	Mỹ Đình Stadium	Details
29 October 2006
Vietnam	2–2	Thailand	Mỹ Đình Stadium	Details

=== 2007 Results ===
From 1 to 5 November 2007, Olympic teams from Finland, Uzbekistan and Zimbabwe were invited to compete against host nation Vietnam in the tournament. The tournament winner was awarded US$40,000 in prize money, US$20,000 for the runners-up and US$10,000 for the third-place team.

Thailand withdrew from the tournament to focus on the 2010 World Cup qualifiers. To fill the void the VFF invited Zimbabwe to replace Thailand.

Team	Pld	W	D	L	GF	GA	GD	Pts
Uzbekistan	3	2	1	0	5	2	+3	7
Finland	3	2	0	1	5	4	+1	6
Vietnam	3	1	0	2	4	4	0	3
Zimbabwe	3	0	1	2	3	6	−3	1

1 November 2007
Zimbabwe	2–3	Finland	16:00	Mỹ Đình Stadium	Details
1 November 2007
Vietnam	1–2	Uzbekistan	18:30	Mỹ Đình Stadium	Details
3 November 2007
Finland	0–2	Uzbekistan	16:00	Mỹ Đình Stadium	Details
3 November 2007
Vietnam	2–0	Zimbabwe	18:30	Mỹ Đình Stadium	Details
5 November 2007
Zimbabwe	1–1	Uzbekistan	16:00	Mỹ Đình Stadium	Details
5 November 2007
Vietnam	1–2	Finland	18:30	Mỹ Đình Stadium	Details

=== 2008 Results ===
In 2008, the tournament was renamed as the T&T Cup due to changes in sponsorship. The tournament lasted from 28 October to 1 November 2008. Initially Vietnam invited national teams from North Korea, Thailand and Uzbekistan to participate in this football tournament. On 26 October the Uzbekistan Football Federation (UFF) informed tournament organisers that they won't be attending the tournament, after sending a list of twenty-five players, so only three national teams competed for this year's T&T Cup. On 1 November, the match between host nation Vietnam and Thailand was postponed due to heavy rain. The match resumed on 16 November 2008, with Thailand winning the tournament following a 2–2 draw with Vietnam.

Team	Pld	W	D	L	GF	GA	GD	Pts
Thailand	2	1	1	0	3	2	+1	4
Vietnam	2	0	2	0	2	2	0	2
North Korea	2	0	1	1	0	1	−1	1

28 October 2008
Thailand	1–0	North Korea	19:00	Mỹ Đình Stadium	Details
30 October 2008
North Korea	0–0	Vietnam	19:00	Mỹ Đình Stadium	Details
16 November 2008
Vietnam	2–2	Thailand	19:00	Mỹ Đình Stadium	Details

=== 2009 Results ===
For the sixth edition of this tournament, the VFF agreed to a sponsorship deal with Smart Door. Hence the 2009 competition was known as the VFF Smart Door Cup. The tournament lasted from 5 to 9 November 2009. Olympic teams from China, Singapore and Thailand were the main competitors in the tournament, against host nation Vietnam. For this edition of the tournament, Vietnam's squad won the VFF Cup for the second time following their 3–1 victory over China.

Team	Pld	W	D	L	GF	GA	GD	Pts
Vietnam	3	2	1	0	4	1	+3	7
China	3	1	1	1	5	5	0	4
Thailand	3	0	3	0	3	3	0	3
Singapore	3	0	1	2	1	4	−3	1

5 November 2009
China	2–2	Thailand	16:40	Mỹ Đình Stadium	Details
5 November 2009
Vietnam	1–0	Singapore	20:00	Mỹ Đình Stadium	Details
7 November 2009
Thailand	1–1	Singapore	17:50	Mỹ Đình Stadium	Details
7 November 2009
China	1–3	Vietnam	20:00	Mỹ Đình Stadium	Details
9 November 2009
Singapore	0–2	China	17:50	Mỹ Đình Stadium	Details
9 November 2009
Vietnam	0–0	Thailand	20:00	Mỹ Đình Stadium	Details

=== 2010 Results ===
The 2010 VFF Cup will be mainly sponsored by Son Ha Company to develop football in Vietnam. As of that, this year's competition was named the VFF SonHa Cup. Vietnam Football Federation had invited the national teams of Korea DPR, Singapore, and a South Korean University Selection Team. These team will be competing against the host nation team Vietnam. For this edition of the tournament, Korea DPR squad won the VFF Cup for the first time following their 2–0 victory over Vietnam. Singapore finished second and the South Korean University Selection Team was third.

Team	Pld	W	D	L	GF	GA	GD	Pts
Korea DPR	3	2	1	0	5	2	+3	7
Singapore	3	1	1	1	4	3	+1	4
South Korea University Selection	3	1	1	1	3	3	0	4
Vietnam	3	0	1	2	1	5	−4	1

2 November 2010
Korea DPR (North Korea)	2–1	Singapore	16:45	Mỹ Đình Stadium	Details
2 November 2010
Vietnam	0–2	(South Korea) South Korean University	19:00	Mỹ Đình Stadium
4 November 2010
South Korean University (South Korea)	1–1	(North Korea) Korea DPR	17:00	Mỹ Đình Stadium
4 November 2010
Vietnam	1–1	Singapore	19:00	Mỹ Đình Stadium	Details
6 November 2010
Singapore	2–0	(South Korea) South Korean University	17:00	Mỹ Đình Stadium	Details
6 November 2010
Vietnam	0–2	(North Korea) Korea DPR	19:00	Mỹ Đình Stadium

=== 2011 Results ===
The 2011 edition of the tournament was known as the VFF-Eximbank Cup. Host nation Vietnam was represented by the Olympic team, as they were preparing for the upcoming 2011 Southeast Asian Games in Indonesia. Olympic teams from Malaysia, Myanmar and Uzbekistan were invited to take part in the tournament. On 23 October 2011, the tournament concluded with Uzbekistan winning the tournament for the second time, whereas host nation Vietnam finished as runners-up. The champions were rewarded with $25,000 in prize money, the second-placed team received $10,000 and the third-placed team was rewarded $5,000.

Team	Pld	W	D	L	GF	GA	GD	Pts
Uzbekistan	3	2	1	0	6	3	+3	7
Vietnam	3	1	2	0	7	2	+5	5
Malaysia	3	1	1	1	4	5	−1	4
Myanmar	3	0	0	3	2	9	−7	0

19 October 2011
Uzbekistan	3–1	Malaysia	17:00	Mỹ Đình Stadium
19 October 2011
Vietnam	5–0	Myanmar	19:15	Mỹ Đình Stadium	Details
21 October 2011
Malaysia	2–1	Myanmar	17:10	Mỹ Đình Stadium
21 October 2011
Uzbekistan	1–1	Vietnam	19:15	Mỹ Đình Stadium	Details
23 October 2011
Myanmar	1–2	Uzbekistan	17:10	Mỹ Đình Stadium	Details
23 October 2011
Vietnam	1–1	Malaysia	19:15	Mỹ Đình Stadium	Details

=== 2012 Results ===
The 2012 edition was initially set to be played between hosts Vietnam, Turkmenistan, North Korea and Iran U-22. Iran and North Korea were replaced by Laos and South Korea University Selection on 10 October. The South Korean team is a selection from the University League, but it doesn't include players from the top 32 universities due to a collision with the 2012 University League Championship schedules. Laos themselves replaced the Maldives who initially looked like taking part as replacements for Iran.

Team	Pld	W	D	L	GF	GA	GD	Pts
South Korea University Selection	3	2	1	0	9	2	+7	7
Turkmenistan	3	2	0	1	5	6	−1	6
Vietnam	3	1	1	1	5	2	+3	4
Laos	3	0	0	3	3	12	−9	0

24 October 2012
Laos	1–4	(South Korea) South Korean University	17:00	Thống Nhất Stadium
24 October 2012
Vietnam	0–1	Turkmenistan	19:15	Thống Nhất Stadium	Details
26 October 2012
South Korean University (South Korea)	4–0	Turkmenistan	17:00	Thống Nhất Stadium
26 October 2012
Vietnam	4–0	Laos	19:00	Thống Nhất Stadium
28 October 2012
Turkmenistan	4–2	Laos	17:15	Thống Nhất Stadium
28 October 2012
Vietnam	1–1	(South Korea) South Korean University	19:00	Thống Nhất Stadium	Details

=== 2018 Results ===
VFF invited the Olympic teams from Oman, Uzbekistan and Barcelona B to join the tournament. Barcelona B declined as they could not collect their best squad. Australia was then called to replace Barcelona B, but they decided to send the U-19 team as their U-23 team needed to play for clubs in FFA Cup. VFF disagreed with the Australian decision since they only wanted a U-23 or Olympic team joining the tournament. Finally, VFF contacted the Palestinian Football Association with the Palestinian agreed to send their Olympic squad to compete.

Team	Pld	W	D	L	GF	GA	GD	Pts
Vietnam	3	2	1	0	4	2	+2	7
Palestine	3	1	1	1	4	4	0	4
Uzbekistan	3	0	2	1	2	3	−1	2
Oman	3	0	2	1	1	2	−1	2

3 August 2018
Uzbekistan	0–0	Oman	16:30	Mỹ Đình Stadium	Details
3 August 2018
Vietnam	2–1	Palestine	19:30	Mỹ Đình Stadium	Details
5 August 2018
Uzbekistan	1–2	Palestine	16:30	Mỹ Đình Stadium	Details
5 August 2018
Oman	0–1	Vietnam	19:30	Mỹ Đình Stadium	Details
7 August 2018
Palestine	1–1	Oman	16:30	Mỹ Đình Stadium	Details
7 August 2018
Vietnam	1–1	Uzbekistan	19:30	Mỹ Đình Stadium	Details

=== 2021 Cancellation ===
VFF invited the Olympic teams from Oman, Japan and Bahrain to join the tournament. But they decided to send the U-19 team as their U-23 team needed to play for clubs in FFA Cup. However, season was cancelled due to COVID-19 pandemic.

=== 2022 Results ===
Singapore and India were invited for participation with the host Vietnam. On 16 August 2022, All India Football Federation (AIFF) was suspended by FIFA due to undue influence from third parties, which constitutes a serious violation of the FIFA Statutes; however, this ban was lifted on 27 August and India can finally compete. Vietnam national team had its first-time ever lifting the VFF Cup trophy by winning all two matches of the tournament.

Pos	Team	Pld	W	D	L	GF	GA	GD	Pts	
1	Vietnam	2	2	0	0	7	0	+7	6	Champions
2	India	2	0	1	1	1	4	−3	1	Runners-up
3	Singapore	2	0	1	1	1	5	−4	1	Third place

21 September 2022
19:00

Vietnam	4−0	Singapore
	Report

Thống Nhất Stadium
24 September 2022
19:00

India	1−1	Singapore
	Report

Thống Nhất Stadium
27 September 2022
19:00

Vietnam	3–0	India
	Report

Thống Nhất Stadium

=== September 2024 Results ===
VFF invited Russia and Thailand to join the tournament. Due to impacts of Typhoon Yagi, the match scheduled on 7 September between Russia and Thailand was canceled. Consequently, there would be no winners team as the tournament was left unifinished.

5 September 2024
20:00

Vietnam	0–3	Russia
	Report	Kuzyayev 24'; Vũ Văn Thanh 62' (o.g.); Musayev 77'

Mỹ Đình National Stadium, Hanoi
Attendance: 5,000
Referee: Yusri Mohamad (Malaysia)
7 September 2024
20:00

Russia	Cancelled (Note: The match was cancelled for safety reasons due to Typhoon Yagi.)	Thailand
	Report

Mỹ Đình National Stadium, Hanoi
10 September 2024
20:00

Vietnam	1–2	Thailand
Nguyễn Tiến Linh 21'	Report	Suphanat 26'; Gustavsson 40'

Mỹ Đình National Stadium, Hanoi
Referee: Suhaizi Shukri (Malaysia)

=== October 2024 cancellation ===
VFF invited India and Lebanon to join the tournament. However, on 3 October 2024, Lebanon announced their withdrawal from the tournament following the 2024 Israeli invasion of Lebanon. Due to lack of time, the Vietnam Football Federation was unable to invite a replacement team and decided to cancel the tournament. The match between Vietnam and India was maintained as a friendly game and was rescheduled to be held on 12 October 2024.

=== 2026 Results ===
VFF invited Chinese Taipei and Kyrgyzstan to join the tournament, as preparations for the 2027 AFC Asian Cup.

Pos	Team	Pld	W	D	L	GF	GA	GD	Pts	
1	Kyrgyzstan	2	2	0	0	5	1	+4	6	Champions
2	Vietnam (H)	2	1	0	1	3	2	+1	3	Runners-up
3	Chinese Taipei	2	0	0	2	0	5	−5	0	Third place

Source: VFF
(H) Hosts
11 November 2026
19:00

Vietnam	2–0	Chinese Taipei
Olaha Mạnh Đức 21'; Nguyễn Đình Bắc 58'	Report

Thiên Trường Stadium, Ninh Bình
Attendance: 2,148
Referee: Nawal Zubir (Malaysia)
14 November 2026
19:00

Chinese Taipei	0–3	Kyrgyzstan
	Report	Zhyrgalbek uulu 31'; Kojo 44'; Akmatov 90+1'

Thiên Trường Stadium, Ninh Bình
Referee: Hoàng Ngọc Hà (Vietnam)
17 November 2026
19:00

Kyrgyzstan	v	Vietnam
	Report

Thiên Trường Stadium, Ninh Bình
Referee: Nawal Zubir (Malaysia)

== Controversy ==
Ever since the inauguration of the Agribank football tournament in 2004 there has always been controversies surrounding the organisation of the tournament. The most recurring issue is the lack of quality teams partaking in the tournament; for the first edition of the tournament Thailand sent a 'selection team' consisted of local league players unknown to Vietnamese fans, instead of the national team as requested by the VFF.

Japan and Bahrain both entered their youth teams in the 2005 and 2006 tournaments respectively, and on each occasion the invited teams lacked the quality that was demanded by the organisers. Due to the expressed disappointments of their Vietnamese organisers in 2006, the Bahrain Football Association (BFA) sent a letter stating their reasons for not sending a full-strength team to the tournament. For the 2007 edition of the Agribank Cup, Thailand once again declined an invitation to take part thus Zimbabwe was invited to fill the gap left by Thailand.

Due to the combination of factors, such as the lack of quality teams and the deficiencies of the VFF as the tournament organiser, Agribank announced that it would stop sponsoring the tournament in 2008.
