= Kraikitti In-utane =

Thai footballer (born 1989)

Personal information
- Full name: Kraikitti In-utane
- Date of birth: March 1, 1989 (age 37)
- Place of birth: Chonburi, Thailand
- Height: 1.77 m (5 ft 9 1/2 in)
- Position: Striker

Senior career*
Years	Team	Apps	(Gls)
2008–2012	TTM Phichit	75	(10)
2013–2014	Chonburi	2	(0)
2014	→ Songkhla United (loan)	15	(2)
2014	→ Chainat Hornbill (loan)	2	(0)
2015	Trat	18	(4)
2016–2017	Thai Honda	6	(2)
2018–2019	Bakhai United		
2019–2022	Samut Sakhon		
2022	Uttaradit Saksiam		

International career^{‡}
2007	Thailand U19	5	(5)
- * Club domestic league appearances and goals as of 12 January 2015 ‡ National team caps and goals as of 12 January 2015

Kraikitti In-utane (Thai: ไกรกิตติ อินอุเทน, born March 1, 1989), simply known as Do (Thai: โด้), is a former Thai professional footballer who plays as a striker.

== International career ==
Kraikitti has represented Thailand U-20 in the 2007 AFF U-20 Youth Championship.

=== Under-19 ===
#	Date	Venue	Opponent	Score	Result	Competition
1.	31 July 2007	Thanh Long Sports Complex, Ho Chi Minh City, Vietnam	Brunei	4–0	7–0	2007 AFF U-20 Youth Championship
2.	31 July 2007	Thanh Long Sports Complex, Ho Chi Minh City, Vietnam	Brunei	6–0	7–0	2007 AFF U-20 Youth Championship
3.	31 July 2007	Thanh Long Sports Complex, Ho Chi Minh City, Vietnam	Brunei	7–0	7–0	2007 AFF U-20 Youth Championship
4.	4 August 2007	Thanh Long Sports Complex, Ho Chi Minh City, Vietnam	Cambodia	4–0	7–0	2007 AFF U-20 Youth Championship
5.	4 August 2007	Thanh Long Sports Complex, Ho Chi Minh City, Vietnam	Cambodia	5–0	7–0	2007 AFF U-20 Youth Championship

== Honours ==
Individual

- AFF U-19 Youth Championship top scorer: 2007
