= Nguyễn Văn Thắng (footballer) =

Vietnamese footballer

Personal information
- Full name: Nguyễn Văn Thắng
- Date of birth: January 15, 1990 (age 36)
- Place of birth: Nghĩa Đàn, Nghệ An, Vietnam
- Height: 1.75 m (5 ft 9 in)
- Position: Defender

Youth career
- 2004–2012: HAGL - Arsenal JMG Academy

Senior career*
Years	Team	Apps	(Gls)
2013–2016	Hoàng Anh Gia Lai	33	(0)
2017–2019	SHB Đà Nẵng	17	(0)
2020–2022	Bình Định	7	(0)
- * Club domestic league appearances and goals as of 2 October 2018

Nguyễn Văn Thắng (born 15 January 1990) is a Vietnamese footballer who plays as a defender for V.League 1 club Bình Định.
