= Syahrul Azwari =

Malaysian footballer

Personal information
- Full name: Syahrul Azwari bin Ibrahim
- Date of birth: 12 January 1993 (age 33)
- Place of birth: Kelantan, Malaysia
- Height: 1.75 m (5 ft 9 in)
- Positions: Right winger; centre-forward

Team information
- Current team: Melaka
- Number: 19

Youth career
- 2007–2010: Bukit Jalil Sports School

Senior career*
Years	Team	Apps	(Gls)
2010–2011	Harimau Muda B	19	(4)
2011–2015	Harimau Muda A	33	(4)
2016	Kelantan	0	(0)
2016	→ Sarawak (loan)	13	(1)
2017	Johor Darul Ta'zim II	13	(1)
2018	Melaka United	8	(1)
2019–2020	Kedah	8	(1)
2021–2022	Kelantan United	13	(1)
2023–	Melaka	6	(0)

International career
2010	Malaysia U-21	24	(12)
2011–2015	Malaysia U-23	22	(17)
2015–	Malaysia	2	(0)
Medal record
Malaysia U23
Sea Games
Gold medal – first place	Sea Games 2011	Football
- * Club domestic league appearances and goals

Syahrul Azwari bin Ibrahim (born 12 January 1993) is a Malaysian professional footballer who plays as a winger. He represented Malaysia U-23 in the 2011 VFF Cup and scored 1 goal. With the U-23 team, he also won the gold medal in 2011 Southeast Asian Games football tournament, where he scored the winning goal against hosts Indonesia in the group stage.

He made his debut for the senior national team in late 2015, with 2 substitute appearances in 2018 FIFA World Cup qualification matches against Palestine and United Arab Emirates.

== Club career ==
=== Sarawak FA ===
On 20 February 2016, Syahrul was confirmed as Sarawak FA player on loan from Kelantan FA for 2016 season. According to the Secretary-general of the Football Association of Malaysia, Hamidin Mohd Amin, both Kelantan Football Association and Football Association of Sarawak has reached an agreement that Syahrul will join Sarawak FA as part of a loan deal.

The saga started when the disbanded of Harimau Muda and all players were instructed to join their home teams but they could also join other teams if the home teams did not want them. Syahrul signed for Sarawak FA in December 2015, despite being offered to return to Kelantan FA according to the Kelantan FA head coach, K. Devan. However, in January, the Football Association of Malaysia Players Status Committee made a decision that Syahrul must play for Kelantan and they must negotiate on new terms and conditions of his contract. However, both parties failed to agree terms, and Sarawak FA finally held talks with Kelantan FA about signing up Syahrul, resulting in a loan deal.

== Career statistics ==
=== Club ===
As of 21 April 2019

Club performance			League		Cup		League Cup		Continental		Total	
Season	Club	League	Apps	Goals	Apps	Goals	Apps	Goals	Apps	Goals	Apps	Goals
2010	Harimau Muda	Malaysia Premier League							-			
2011	Harimau Muda	Malaysia Super League	19	4					-		19	4
2012	Harimau Muda	S.League	18	2					-		18	2
2013	Harimau Muda	S.League							-			
2014	Harimau Muda	Football Queensland							-			
2015	Harimau Muda	S.League	15	2	0	0	0	0	-		15	2
Total			0	0	0	0	0	0	-		0	0
2016	Sarawak (loan)	Malaysia Super League	12	1	1	0	0	0	-		13	1
Total			12	1	1	0	0	0	-		13	1
2017	Johor Darul Ta'zim II	Malaysia Super League	13	1	1	0	0	0	-		14	1
Total			13	1	1	0	0	0	-		14	1
2018	Melaka United	Malaysia Super League	8	1	0	0	0	0	-		8	1
Total			8	1	0	0	0	0	-		8	1
2019	Kedah FA	Malaysia Super League	8	1	2	0	0	0	-		10	1
Total			8	1	2	0	0	0	-		10	1
Career total												

=== International ===
As of 6 September 2016.

National team	Year	Apps	Goals
Malaysia
Malaysia	2015	2	0
Total		2	0

== International goals ==
=== Malaysia U23 ===
#	Date	Venue	Opponent	Score	Result	Competition
1.	17 November 2011	Jakarta, Indonesia	Indonesia	1–0	Win	2011 SEA Games
2.	2 June 2015	Bishan, Singapore	Vietnam	1–4	1–5	2015 Southeast Asian Games

== Honours ==
=== Club ===
Kedah

- Malaysia FA Cup: 2019

=== International ===
Malaysia U23

- Southeast Asian Games (1): 2011
