= 2011 VFF Cup =

Tournament details
- Host country: Vietnam
- Dates: 19–23 October
- Teams: 4
- Venue(s): 1 (in 1 host city)

Final positions
- Champions: Uzbekistan (2nd title)
- Runners-up: Vietnam
- Third place: Malaysia
- Fourth place: Myanmar

Tournament statistics
- Matches played: 6
- Goals scored: 19 (3.17 per match)
- Top scorer(s): (Malaysia) Baddrol Bakhtiar (2 goals)

The 2011 VFF Cup was the 8th season of the annual football tournament organised in Vietnam, took place on 19–23 October 2011.

== Venue ==
Hanoi
Mỹ Đình National Stadium
21°1′14″N 105°45′49.7″E
Capacity: 40,000
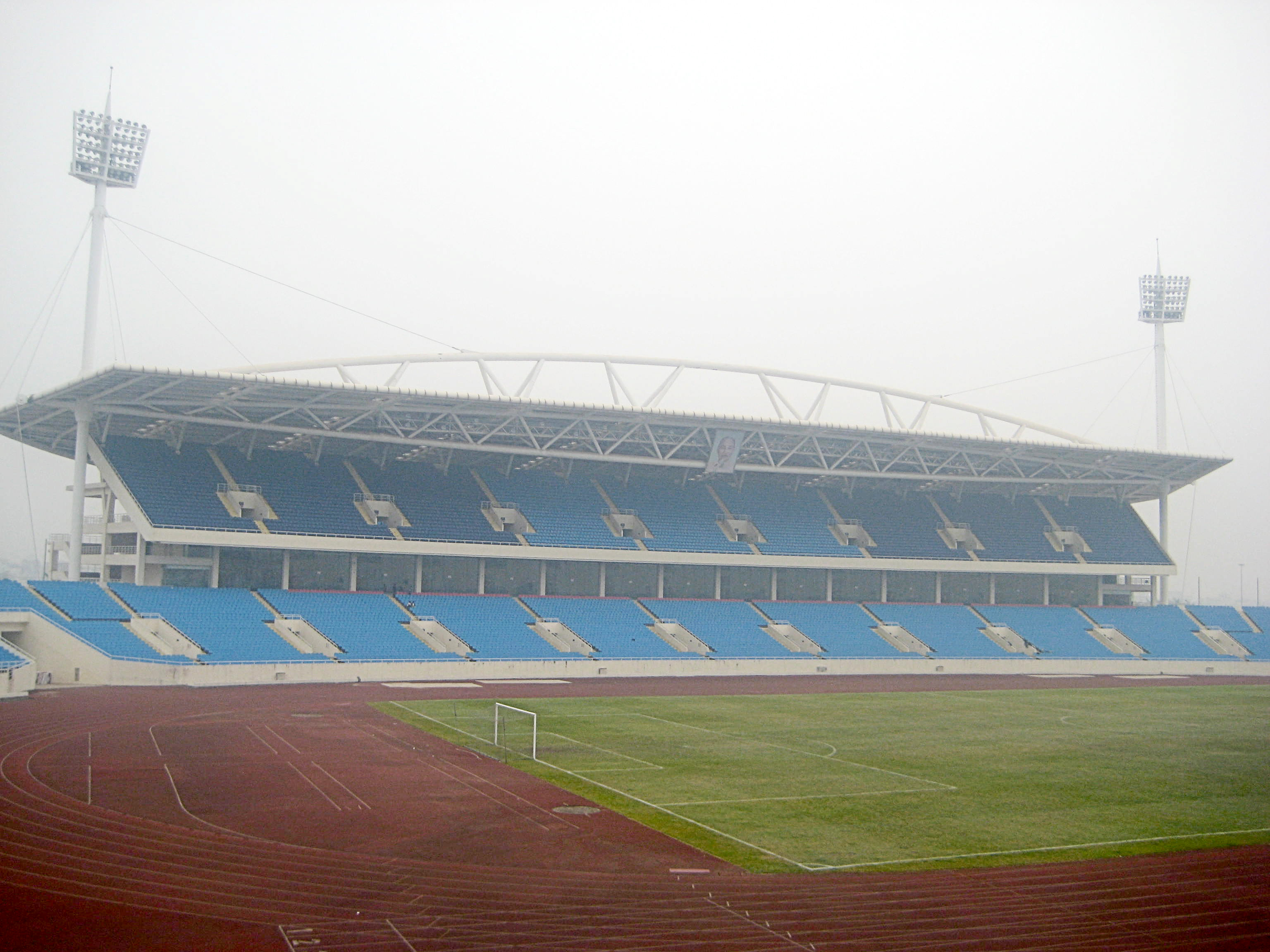

== Result ==
Team	Pld	W	D	L	GF	GA	GD	Pts
Uzbekistan	3	2	1	0	6	3	+3	7
Vietnam	3	1	2	0	7	2	+5	5
Malaysia	3	1	1	1	4	5	−1	4
Myanmar	3	0	0	3	2	9	−7	0

19 October 2011
17:00

Uzbekistan	3–1	Malaysia
Valijonnov 53'; Khodjiakbarov 76'; Kilichev 83'	Report	Fandi 90'

Mỹ Đình National Stadium, Hanoi
Attendance: 200
19 October 2011
19:15

Vietnam	5–0	Myanmar
Lê Hoàng Thiên 33', 38'; Chu Ngọc Anh 45+3' (pen.); Phạm Thành Lương 48', 89'	Report

Mỹ Đình National Stadium, Hanoi
Attendance: 30,000

21 October 2011
17:00

Malaysia	2–1	Myanmar
Syahrul 54'; Baddrol 83'	Report	Kyaw Ko Ko 38'

Mỹ Đình National Stadium, Hanoi
Attendance: 150
21 October 2011
19:15

Uzbekistan	1–1	Vietnam
Smolyachenko 54'	Report	Nguyễn Văn Quyết 57'

Mỹ Đình National Stadium, Hanoi
Attendance: 30,000

23 October 2011
17:00

Myanmar	1–2	Uzbekistan
Min Min Tun 36'	Report	Shagulyamov 12'; Smolyachenko 16'

Mỹ Đình National Stadium, Hanoi
Attendance: 200
Referee: Phùng Đình Dũng (Vietnam)
23 October 2011
19:15

Vietnam	1–1	Malaysia
Nguyễn Trọng Hoàng 26'	Report	Baddrol 43'

Mỹ Đình National Stadium, Hanoi
Attendance: 30,000
Referee: Prathan Nasawang (Thailand)

== Goalscorers ==
2 goals

- (Malaysia) Baddrol Bakhtiar
- (Uzbekistan) Pavel Smolyachenko
- (Vietnam) Lê Hoàng Thiên
- (Vietnam) Phạm Thành Lương

1 goal

- (Malaysia) Mohd Fandi Othman
- (Malaysia) Syahrul Azwari Ibrahim
- (Myanmar) Kyaw Ko Ko
- (Myanmar) Min Min Tun
- (Uzbekistan) Otabek Valijonnov
- (Uzbekistan) Abdukakhor Khodjiakbarov
- (Uzbekistan) Oybek Kilichev
- (Uzbekistan) Alisher Shagulyamov
- (Vietnam) Chu Ngọc Anh
- (Vietnam) Nguyễn Văn Quyết
- (Vietnam) Nguyễn Trọng Hoàng
