= Greg Little (footballer) =

New Zealand footballer

Personal information
- Full name: Gregory D R Little
- Place of birth: New Zealand

Senior career*
Years	Team	Apps	(Gls)
- Mount Maunganui

International career
1985–1988	New Zealand	4	(1)
- * Club domestic league appearances and goals

Gregory D R Little is a former association football player who represented New Zealand at international level.

Little made his full New Zealand debut in a 5-0 win over Fiji on 3 June 1985 and ended his international playing career with four official A-international caps and one goal to his credit, his final cap an appearance in a 2-0 win over Taiwan on 20 March 1988.
