= Hoàng Văn Bình =

Vietnamese footballer (born 1989)

- 2019

Personal information
- Full name: Hoàng Văn Bình
- Date of birth: February 1, 1989 (age 37)
- Place of birth: Nghĩa Đàn, Nghệ An, Vietnam
- Height: 1.72 m (5 ft 8 in)
- Position: Central midfielder

Youth career
- 2000–2006: Sông Lam Nghệ An

Senior career*
Years	Team	Apps	(Gls)
2007–2013	Sông Lam Nghệ An	58	(2)
2013–2015	Becamex Bình Dương	22	(0)
2015–2018	FLC Thanh Hóa	48	(6)
2018–2019	Sông Lam Nghệ An	29	(0)

International career^{‡}
2011–2012	Vietnam U23	1	(0)
2012–2013	Vietnam	2	(0)
- * Club domestic league appearances and goals as of 2 January 2020 ‡ National team caps and goals as of 2 January 2020

Hoàng Văn Bình (born 1 February 1989) is a former Vietnamese footballer who played as a midfielder for V-League club Sông Lam Nghệ An and the Vietnam national football team.
