= Nguyễn Đức Nhân =

Vietnamese footballer

Personal information
- Full name: Nguyễn Đức Nhân
- Date of birth: 3 February 1989 (age 37)
- Place of birth: Nhơn Trạch, Đồng Nai, Vietnam
- Height: 1.67 m (5 ft 6 in)
- Position: Central midfielder

Youth career
- 2001–2006: Đồng Nai

Senior career*
Years	Team	Apps	(Gls)
2007–2022	Đồng Nai	268	(42)

International career
2007–2009	Vietnam U20	3	(0)
- * Club domestic league appearances and goals

Nguyễn Đức Nhân (3 February 1989) is a Vietnamese footballer who plays as a central midfielder for Đồng Nai
