= Trần Mạnh Dũng =

Vietnamese footballer

Personal information
- Full name: Trần Mạnh Dũng
- Date of birth: 9 March 1990 (age 36)
- Place of birth: Hải Hậu, Nam Định, Vietnam
- Height: 1.66 m (5 ft 5 in)
- Positions: Attacking midfielder; striker

Youth career
- 2002–2007: Nam Định

Senior career*
Years	Team	Apps	(Gls)
2008–2010	Nam Định	17	(0)
2011–2014	Vissai Ninh Bình	43	(2)

International career
2007–2008	Vietnam U20	3	(0)
2009–2010	Vietnam U21	2	(0)
2011–2012	Vietnam U23	4	(0)
2013–2014	Vietnam	7	(1)
- * Club domestic league appearances and goals

Trần Mạnh Dũng (born 9 March 1990) is a Vietnamese footballer who played as an attacking midfielder or striker. He was also a member of the Vietnam national team.

== International career ==
In 2013, Mạnh Dũng scored Vietnam's only goal in their 1–7 defeat against English team Arsenal.

== Match-fixing scandal ==
During the 2014 V.League 1 season, Vissai Ninh Bình wrote to the Vietnam Football Federation (VFF) and to the Vietnam Professional Football Joint Stock Company to withdraw from the league due to 13 players being involved in match fixing. On 25 August 2014, Mạnh Dũng was found guilty of the charge and was sentenced to 30 months in prison for being the groups ring-leader. In December, the VFF banned him for life from playing football in the country, effectively ended his career.
