= Nghĩa Đàn district =

Nghĩa Đàn district Huyện Nghĩa Đàn
- District
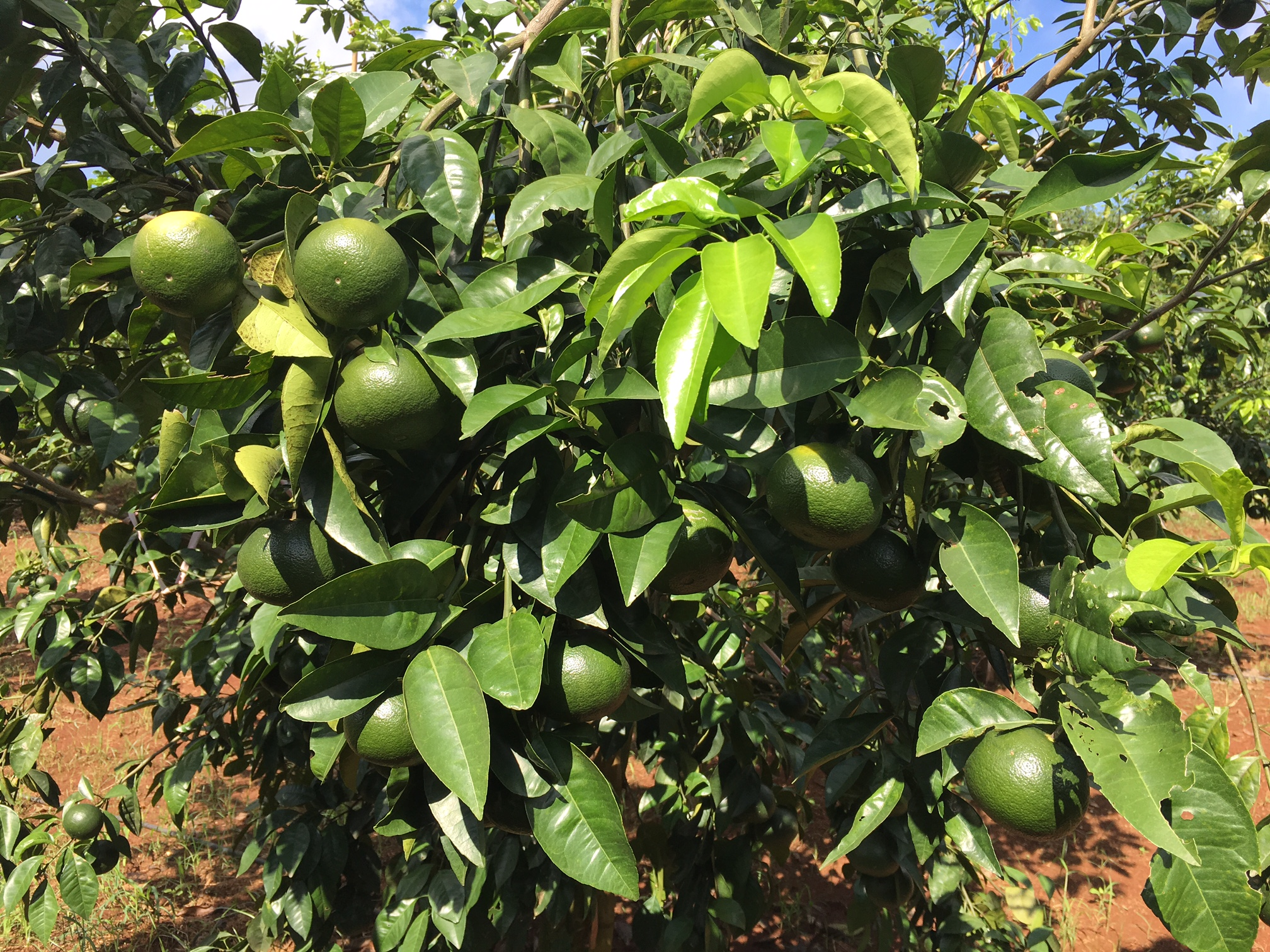
- Tangerines, common in Nghệ An province

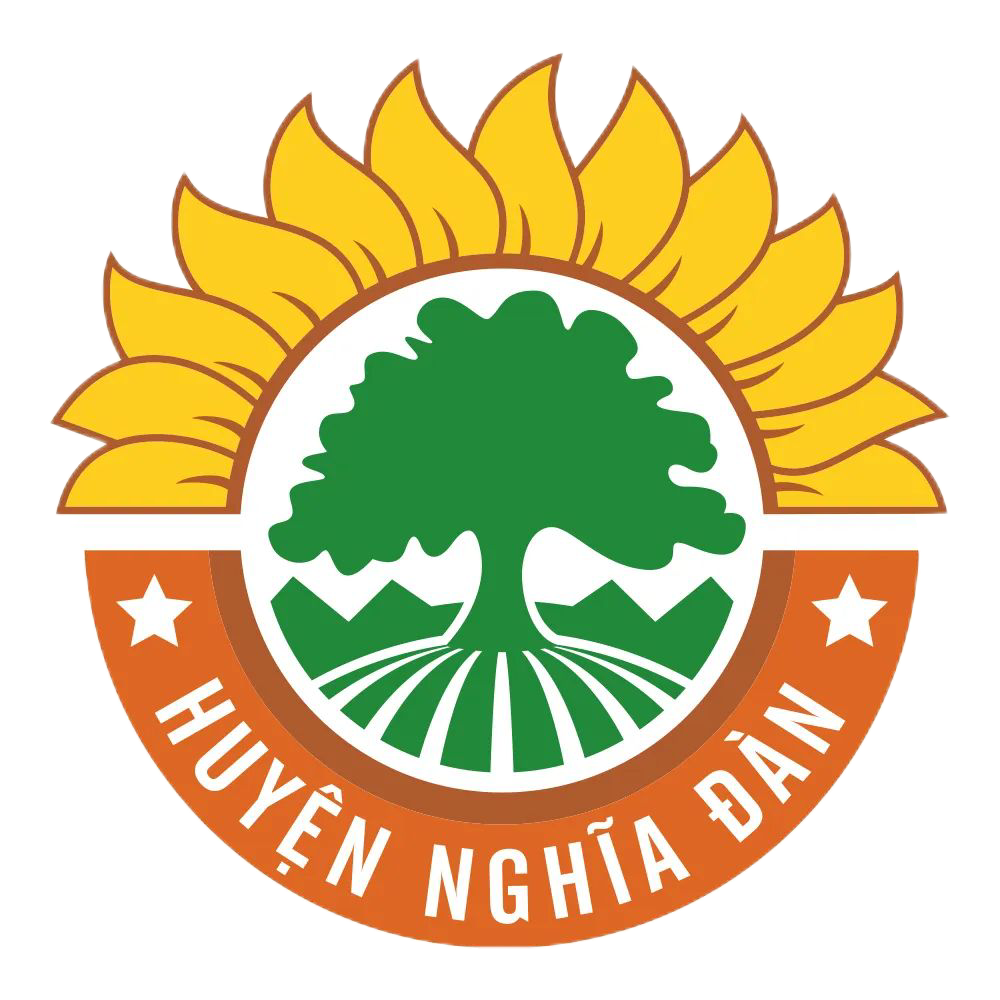
- Seal
- Interactive map of Nghĩa Đàn district
- Country: Vietnam
- Region: North Central Coast
- Province: Nghệ An
- Capital: Nghĩa Bình

Area
  - Total: 617.5 km^{2} (238.4 sq mi)

Population (2003)
  - Total: 188,871
- Time zone: UTC+07:00 (Indochina Time)

Nghĩa Đàn is a former commercial and rural district of Nghệ An province, in the North Central Coast region of Vietnam. As of 2003, the district had a population of 188,871. The district covers an area of 748 km^{2} (289 sq mi). The district capital is in Nghĩa Bình Commune.

== Attractions ==
Dong Du Village is about 68 km to the west of province capital Vinh on the way to and from Phong Nha - Kẻ Bàng and Ninh Bình. Dong Du Village is a typical Vietnamese agricultural village in terms of culture and traditions. The village is surrounded by mountains which are mirrored in Khe Lau Lake. Also, similar to other typical traditional Vietnamese villages in the far north of Vietnam, Dong Du Village has golden rice fields in the harvest time, many lakes and waterlily and lotus ponds and colorful gardens, especially the ranges of areca and coconut trees in the sunshine.

Dong Du Village has many historical monuments and an ancient house named Dong Truc which contains cultural and historical values dated back to the Lý and Tran dynasties. In the village, all the alley roads have stone walls. The community-based tourism project has been developed in Dong Du Village since 2001. Visitors can visit Dong Du Village to see water puppet shows and enjoy swimming, kayaking and standup paddle boarding in Khe Lau lake and stay overnight with family in cozy homestays.
