= Chu Ngọc Anh =

Vietnamese footballer (born 1989)

Personal information
- Full name: Chu Ngọc Anh
- Date of birth: 9 January 1989 (age 37)
- Place of birth: Ý Yên, Nam Định, Vietnam
- Height: 1.73 m (5 ft 8 in)
- Position: Defender

Youth career
- 2000–2006: Nam Định

Senior career*
| Years | Team | Apps | (Gls) |
| 2007–2012 | Nam Định | 14 | (1) |
| 2012–2013 | Hà Nội | 2 | (0) |
| 2014–2022 | Đồng Tháp | 94 | (0) |

International career
| 2009–2011 | Vietnam U23 | 4 | (1) |
| 2010–2014 | Vietnam | 2 | (0) |
- * Club domestic league appearances and goals

Chu Ngọc Anh (born 9 January 1989) is a Vietnamese professional footballer who plays as a defender for Đồng Tháp. In March 2014, while playing for Vissai Ninh Binh, he was implicated in a match-fixing scandal involving a total of VND 85million.
