= Phú Thiện district =

Phú Thiện district Huyện Phú Thiện
- District
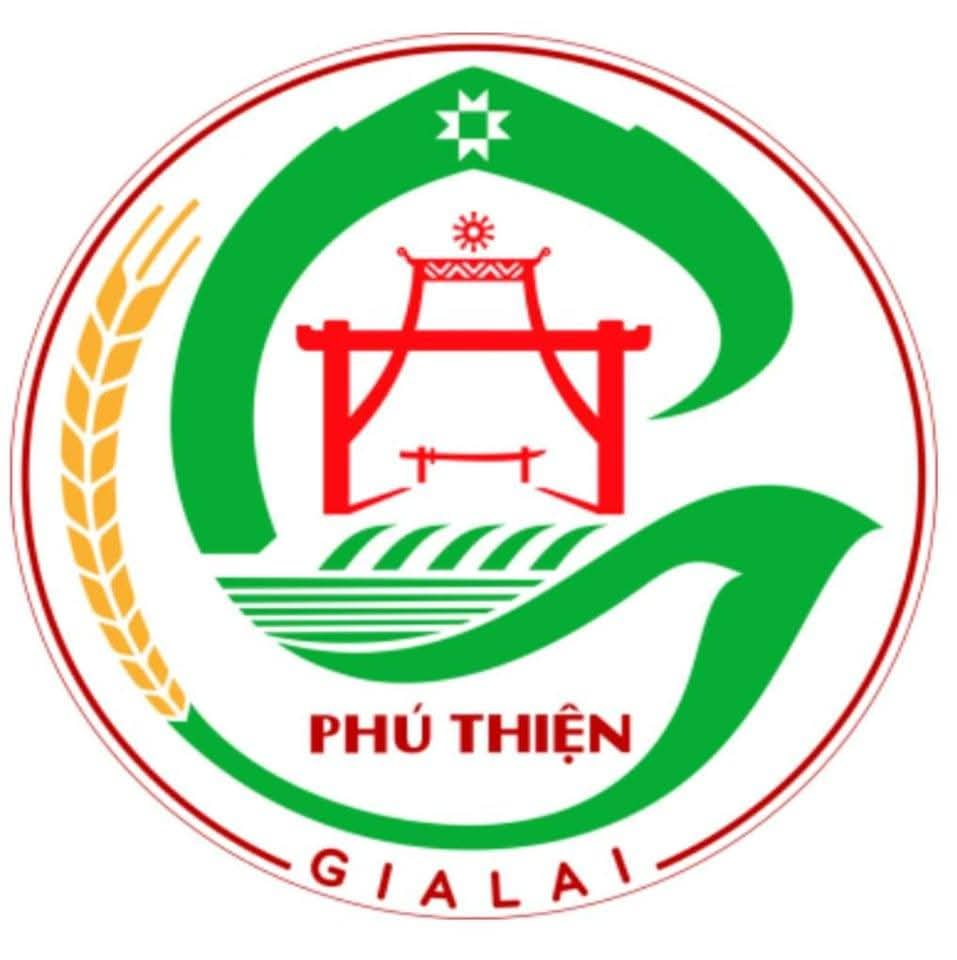
- Seal
- Interactive map of Phú Thiện district
- Country: Vietnam
- Region: Central Highlands
- Province: Gia Lai province

Area
  - Total: 195.05 sq mi (505.17 km^{2})

Population (31/12/2024)
  - Total: 92,399
  - Density: 473.73/sq mi (182.91/km^{2})
- Time zone: UTC+7 (Indochina Time)

Phú Thiện is a former rural district (huyện) of Gia Lai province in the Central Highlands region of Vietnam.
