= 1922 New Zealand v Australia soccer match =

New Zealand v Australia (1922)
- The match programme cover
- Event: International friendly
New Zealand	Australia
(New Zealand)	(Australia)
3	1
- Date: 17 June 1922
- Venue: Carisbrook Park, Dunedin, New Zealand
- Referee: M. Thornley (New Zealand)
- Attendance: c. 10,000

The 1922 association football match between New Zealand and Australia was not only the first full international match for both sides, but the first international held in Oceania. New Zealand won 3–1, initiating a long-time rivalry between both teams, that have met more than 60 times since that first encounter.

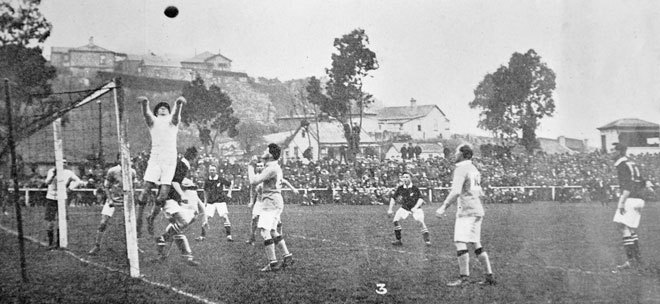
The first Australia team playing New Zealand in 1922

== Match details ==
17 June 1922
14:45

New Zealand	3–1	Australia
Cook 20' (?); Knott (?)	Report	Maunder 45'

Carisbrook Park, Dunedin
Attendance: c. 10,000
Referee: M. Thornley (New Zealand)

New Zealand
Australia

GK	1	Reg Craxton
RB	2	Rewi Braithwaite
LB	3	Robert McAuley
RH	4	Bill Brownlee
CH	5	Jock Corbett
LH	6	Dan Jones
OR	7	Walter Brundell
IR	8	Bill Knott
CF	9	Ted Cook
IL	10	George Campbell (c)
OL	11	Charles Ballard

GK	1	George Cartwright
RB	2	Allen Fisher
LB	3	Dave Cumberford
RH	4	Alex Gibb (c)
CH	5	Clarence Shenton
LH	6	Peter Doyle
OR	7	William Dane
IR	8	Jock Cumberford
CF	9	William Maunder
IL	10	Dave Ward
OL	11	Tom Thompson

== See also ==
- Australia–New Zealand soccer rivalry
- History of the Australia men's national soccer team
- 1872 Scotland v England football match
