= 1922 in Australian soccer =

Soccer in Australia
- Season: 1922

The 1922 season was the 39th season of regional competitive soccer in Australia. It was also the year that the inaugural Australian soccer football team (later designated the 'Socceroos') toured New Zealand, where it played its first-ever 'A' international matches.

== National teams ==
=== Australia men's national soccer team ===
Australia played their first international match against New Zealand on 17 June 1922 at Carisbrook Park, captained by Alex Gibb in a squad composed entirely of New South Wales and Queensland players. They were defeated 3–1 with William Maunder scoring Australia's first international goal in front of approximately 10,000 spectators. Ahead of their next match just a week later, Dave Ward was replaced by Wilfred Bratton in the Australia team the day before their next match against New Zealand on 24 July 1922, which was drawn 1–1 with Bratton scoring on debut and only match. Ward returned to squad for Australia's last match of the year on 8 July 1922 against New Zealand in which they lost 3–1 with George Brown scoring for Australia, finishing the three match series with two losses and one draw.

==== Results and fixtures ====
===== Friendlies =====
17 June 1922	New Zealand	3–1	Australia	Dunedin, New Zealand
	Cook 20' (?); Knott (?)	Report	Maunder 45'	Stadium: Carisbrook Park; Attendance: 10,000; Referee: M. Thornley

24 June 1922	New Zealand	1–1	Australia	Wellington, New Zealand
	Cook 10'	Report	Bratton 45'	Stadium: Athletic Park; Attendance: 12,000; Referee: R.S. Lithgow

8 July 1922	New Zealand	3–1	Australia	Auckland, New Zealand
	Ballard 5'; Cook 10'; Dacre (?)	Report	Brown (?)	Stadium: Domain Park; Attendance: 15,000; Referee: L.C.H. Dawson

==== Player statistics ====
Pos.	Player	Apps.	Goals
GK	George Cartwright	3	0
FB	Dave Cumberford	3	0
FB	Allen Fisher	3	0
HB	Alex Gibb	3	0
HB	Peter Doyle	3	0
HB	Clarence Shenton	3	0
FW	Wilfred Bratton	1	1
FW	George Brown	2	1
FW	Jock Cumberford	3	0
FW	William Dane	2	0
FW	William Maunder	3	1
FW	Tom Thompson	2	0
FW	Dave Ward	2	0

== League competitions ==
Federation	Competition	Grand Final			Regular Season		
Federation	Competition	Champions	Score	Runners-up	Winners	Runners-up	Third place
Northern District British Football Association	Northern NSW Football League	West Wallsend Bluebells	4–2	Cessnock	West Wallsend Bluebells	Wallsend	Weston
Australian Soccer Association	Sydney Metropolitan First Division	Pyrmont	Unknown		Pyrmont	Balmain Fernleigh	Granville
Queensland Football Association	Brisbane-Ipswich League	Not played			Bundamba Rangers	Thistle	Blackstone Rovers
South Australian British Football Association	South Australia Division One	Not played			North Adelaide	Cheltenham	South Adelaide
Tasmanian Soccer Association	Tasmanian Division One	South Hobart	5–1	North Esk	Unknown		
Anglo-Australian Football Association	Victorian League Division One	Not played			Northumberland & Durham	Preston	Albert Park
Western Australian Soccer Football Association	Western Australia Division One	Not played			Perth City United	Northern Casuals	Claremont

== Cup competitions ==
Federation	Competition	Winners	Runners-up	Venue	Result
Northern District British Football Association	Ellis Cup	Wallsend	West Wallsend	–	3–1 (R)
New South Wales British Football Association	Gardiner Challenge Cup	Granvile (3/3)	West Wallsend (3/4)	–	1–0
South Australian British Football Association	South Australia Federation Cup	Cheltenham (2/2)	Sturt (1/2)	–	1–0
Tasmanian Soccer Association	Falkinder Cup	Cadburys (1/0)	South Hobart (3/2)	–	1–0
Anglo-Australian Football Association	Dockerty Cup	Albert Park (1/1)	Windsor (0/2)	–	3–2

(Note: figures in parentheses display the club's competition record as winners/runners-up.)

== See also ==
- Soccer in Australia
