= Cumberford =

Cumberford is a surname. Notable people with the surname include:

- Dave Cumberford, Australian association football player
- Jock Cumberford, Australian association football player
- Robert Cumberford (born 1935), American automotive designer, author, and design critic
