= Craxton (surname) =

Craxton is a surname. Notable people with the surname include:

- Harold Craxton (1885–1971), English pianist and composer
- Janet Craxton (1929–1981), English oboist and teacher, daughter of Harold
- John Craxton (1922–2009), English painter, son of Harold
- Reg Craxton (active 1920s), New Zealand football player
