= List of Adamstown Rosebud FC internationals =

Adamstown Rosebud Football Club is an Australian semi-professional association football club based in Adamstown, Newcastle. Founded on 12 July 1889, the club was one of the oldest Australian clubs to join the National Soccer League (in 1984).

Players can be called up to represent their national team in a senior international match; a total of 13 players have won at least one cap for their country in senior international football while playing for Adamstown Rosebud. In June 1922, Peter Doyle became the first Adamstown Rosebud player to be capped when he appeared for Australia's first international match against New Zealand.

== List of internationals ==
Key

- Players are initially arranged by alphabetical order of surname.
- Appearances as a substitute are included.
- International years indicates the year of the player's first and last caps while an Adamstown Rosebud player. Caps included are for the number won by the player during his time with Adamstown Rosebud.

Positions key (Note: For more information, see formation)
Pre-1960s		1960s–	
GK	Goalkeeper		
FB	Full back	DF	Defender
HB	Half back	MF	Midfielder
FW	Forward		

List of players making full international appearances while playing for Adamstown Rosebud FC (Note: Statistics are sourced from Andrew Howe's book Encyclopedia of Socceroos Centenary Edition, 1922 to 2022 and UltimateNZSoccer.com)
Name	Nation	Position	Adamstown Rosebud years	International years	Caps (Note: Only caps and goals while playing for Adamstown Rosebud are included.)	Goals	Notes
Alec Cameron	Australia	FW	1922–1937	1933–1936	6	6	
Bill Coolahan	Australia	HB	1929–1930, 1935–1942	1938	3	1	
Dave Coote	Australia	HB	1939–1941, 1942–1951	1947	2	0	
Colin Curran	Australia	DF	1964–1965, 1966–1970, 1972–1973, 1976	1970	4	0	
Peter Doyle	Australia	HB	1918–?	1922–1923	4	0	
Clint Gosling	New Zealand	GK	1983–1986, 1993, 1994	1984–1993	8	0	
Alf Henwood	Australia	FB	1932–1941	1938	2	0	
Allan Johns	Australia	FW	1943–1949	1948–1950	10	6	
Arch Lambert	Australia	HB	1920–1928	1924	1	0	
Bill Mahoney	Australia	GK	1951–1962	1955	1	0	
Aub Mascord	Australia	FB	1932–1937	1938	1	0	
Bill Morgan	Australia	GK	1927–1944	1938	1	0	
Cyril Nichols	Australia	FB	1947–1961	1950	2	0	
