= History of the Australia men's national soccer team =

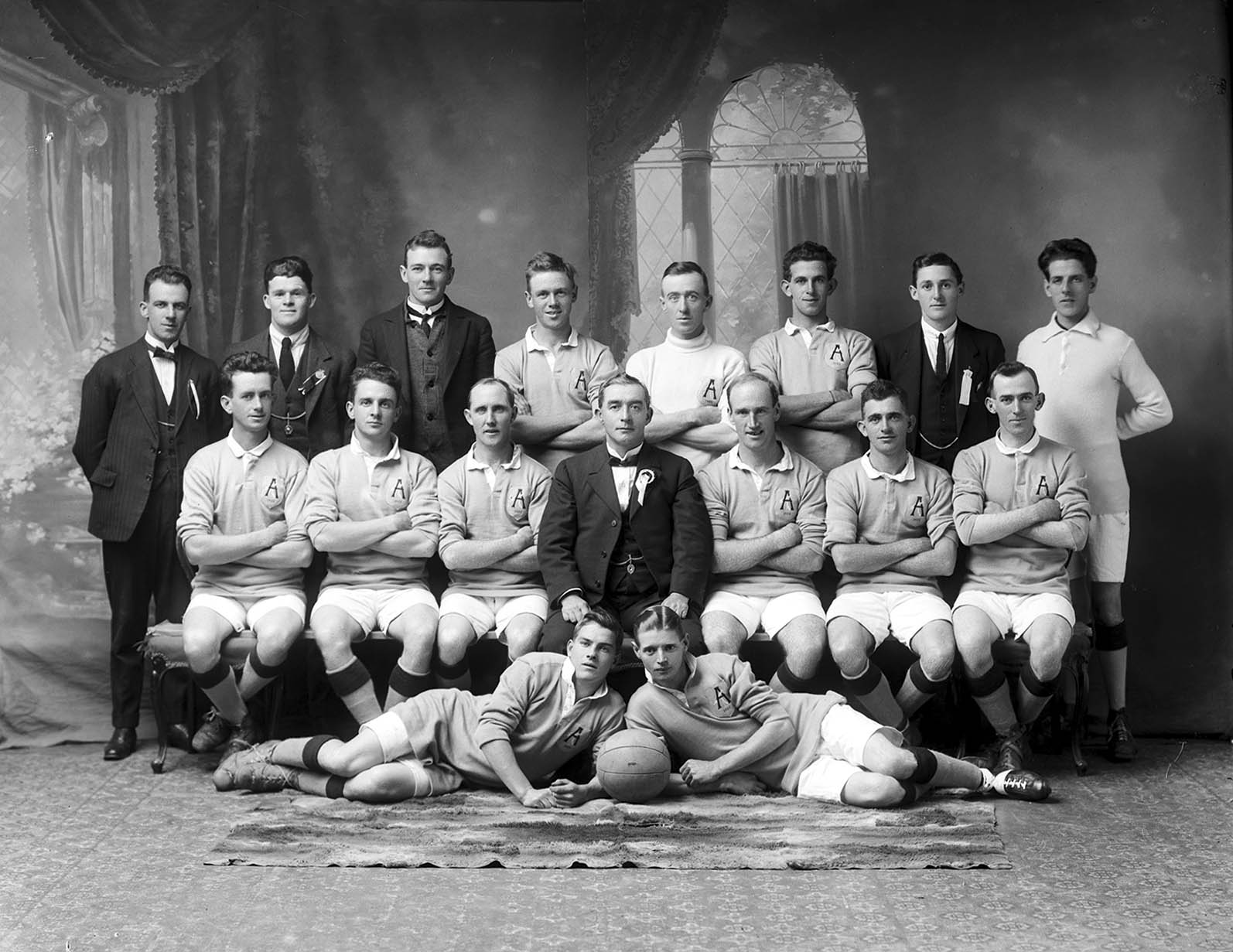
The first Australia national side (wearing light blue shirts) that toured New Zealand in 1922

The Australia men's national soccer team played their first international match in 1922. They have won one AFC Asian Cup title in 2015 in addition to four OFC Nations Cup titles in 1980, 1996, 2000 and 2004. Australia have never won the FIFA World Cup, with their best performance being a finish in the round of 16 in 2006 and 2022.

== 1916 Olympics ==
The founding of the Commonwealth Football Association (CFA) in 1911 led to calls from state affiliates to enter an Australian team in the 1916 Summer Olympics. There was discussion and some confusion over whether Australia needed to be directly affiliated with FIFA to compete. There was a view that the Australia was entitled to compete as a result of the CFA's affiliation with The Football Association. In 1912, two directives were issued by FIFA. The first required Olympic football participants to be affiliated with FIFA. The second exempted colonies from a requirement to separately affiliate. Ultimately, these provisions were never tested due to the onset of World War I.

== 1922–64: Early years ==
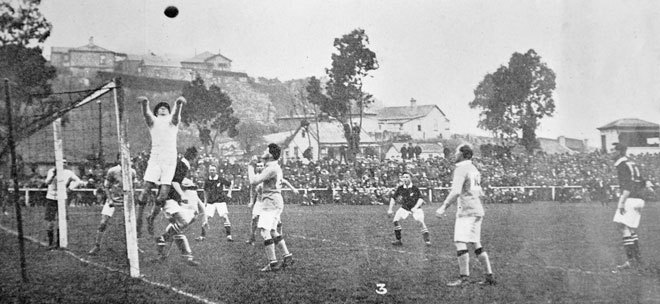
Australia (light blue shirts) playing New Zealand in 1922

The first Australia national team was constituted in 1922 for a tour of New Zealand, which included two defeats and a draw in the Test matches played v the New Zealand side. The first Australia international match was a 3–1 defeat on 17 June 1922 with an attendance of 7,000. The Australia line-up was George Cartwright (NSW), D. Cumberford (Queensland.). A. Gibb (Q.), C. Shenton (Q.), P. Doyle (N.S.W.), W. Dane (N.S.W.), J. Cumberford (Q.). W. Maunder (N.S.W.). D. Ward (N.S.W.). and T. Thompson (N.S.W.). A. Fisher (N.S.W.). The tour ended with a 1–1 draw in Wellington and another 3–1 loss in Auckland.

Australia, New Zealand, and South Africa became regular opponents in test (exhibition) matches for the next 36 years, with Australia playing South Africa on 14 occasions in three test series and Australia playing trans-Tasman neighbours New Zealand on 21 occasions in seven test series during that time period. During that period, Australia also competed against Canada and India during their tours of Australia in 1924 and 1938 respectively. Australia recorded their worst ever defeat on 30 June 1951 as they lost 17–0 in a test match to a touring England side.

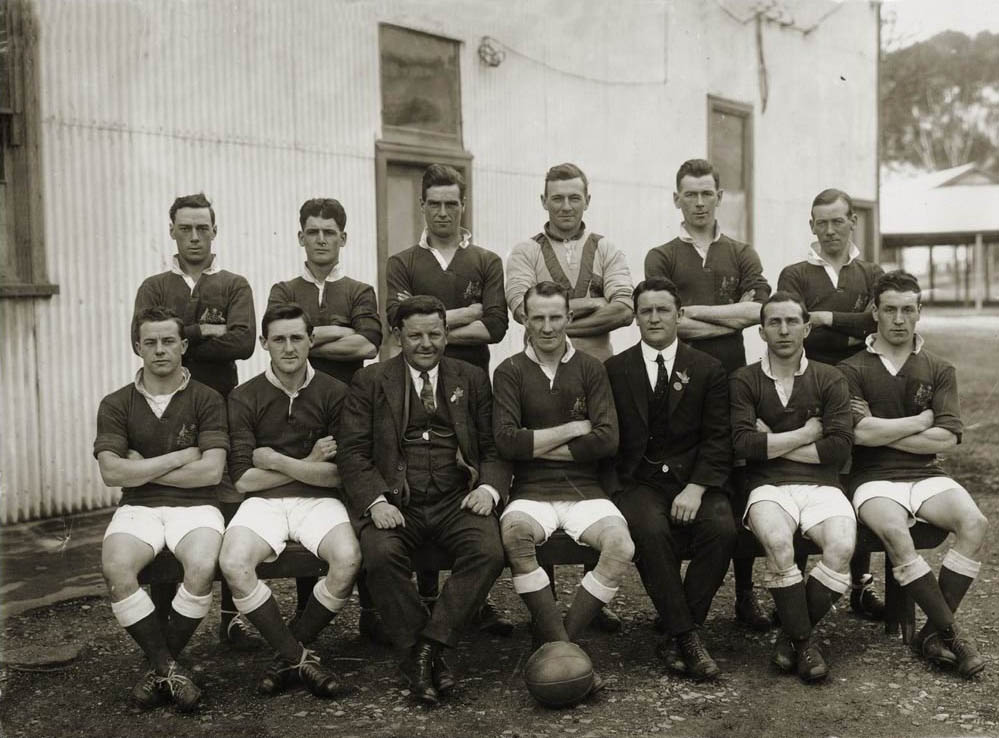
Australian team in 1924

Australia would have a rare opportunity to compete on the world's stage during the team's very first major international tournament as hosts of the 1956 Melbourne Olympics. A squad coached by Richard Telfer set out to try to win the tournament on home turf where they were drawn against Japan in the round of 16 (as the tournament was held in the knock-out stage format). A goal in each half, a penalty scored by Graham McMillan in the 26th minute and then a goal by Irish born striker Frank Loughran in the 61st minute, was enough to see off Japan. Facing India in the quarter-final stages, two goals from Bruce Morrow saw Australia equalise twice in the first half (first 1–1 and then 2–2). The teams were locked at 2–2 until the 50th minute, when India's Neville D'Souza put his side ahead before Krishna Kittu added another in the 80th minute. It was ultimately the squad's lack of experience that proved to be reason for the team's disappointing performance in the tournament, with Laurie Schwab from The Age commenting, "Australian soccer has lost a wonderful chance to gain world prominence and the game has suffered a body blow". The advent of cheap air travel in the 1960s allowed Australia to diversify its range of opponents. However, its geographical isolation continued to play a role in its destiny for the next 30 years.

== 1965–90: First FIFA World Cup campaigns ==
=== 1966 FIFA World Cup qualification ===
Australia's first attempt to qualify for a FIFA World Cup was in 1965. Australia was originally to compete against 18 African and Asian nations for one World Cup qualifying position. However, after the suspension of South Africa by FIFA and the withdrawal of all but one of the competing teams, Australia was left to play against North Korea in a two-legged series. The winner would take the 16th qualifying position for the 1966 FIFA World Cup the following year. The two match series was played in neutral Cambodia, the first of which, Australia lost 6–1 with Les Scheinflug scoring the only goal of the match. In the second match, three days later Australia gained the lead in the 15th minute from a Les Scheinflug goal but North Korea would come back to win the match 3–1 to take out the tie with an aggregate score of 9–2.

In the wake of this loss, Australia competed in the 1967 South Vietnam Independence Cup as they were put in Group A with the host nation (South Vietnam), Singapore and New Zealand. After making it all the way to the final to take on South Korea where they would claim their first international trophy with a 3–2 win over the Koreans. But this tournament would only gain little recognition domestically.

=== 1970 FIFA World Cup qualification ===
Australia's 1970 FIFA World Cup qualification began in 1969, with a series of home and away group matches, against South Korea and Japan. After topping the group, Australia then advanced to the next stage where they would play Rhodesia in a two-legged fixture in Maputo. After drawing the first leg 1–1 and the second leg 0–0, a third decider match was played where Australia won 3–1. Israel, having itself knocked out New Zealand at the equivalent stage, was then drawn as Australia's final hurdle. The first match, of a home and away fixture was lost 1–0 in Tel Aviv. A 1–1 draw in Sydney saw Australia eliminated from qualification, with Israel progressing to the 1970 FIFA World Cup after their 2–1 aggregate win.

=== 1974 FIFA World Cup ===
The road to the 1974 World Cup began with a series of home and away group matches in 1973, against Iraq, New Zealand and Indonesia. Australia, having topped the group, then advanced to the next stage where they played and won a two-legged fixture against Iran, managing to hold on to a slim overall lead in front of 120,000 Iranian fans in the Azadi Stadium, Tehran, during the second leg. South Korea, having itself knocked out Israel at the equivalent stage, was then drawn as Australia's final hurdle. Over the course of another two-legged playoff the scores remained even at 2–2, and so a deciding match was played in Hong Kong. Australia won this match 1–0, through a Jimmy Mackay goal, scored off a free kick. This win secured Australian a spot at the 1974 FIFA World Cup in West Germany, the first ever appearance for the country.

Australia were drawn into Group A consisting of hosts and favourites West Germany, East Germany and Chile. Australia held the East German's 0–0 at half-time before defender Colin Curran deflected the ball into his own net early in the second half. East German striker Joachim Streich then secured the points with a goal halfway through the second half, with the game finishing 2–0. Australia lost their following match to West Germany 3–0 with goals to Wolfgang Overath, Bernhard Cullmann and star-striker Gerd Müller. Having lost both their opening games, Australia could not proceed further in the tournament, though the Australians managed to hold Chile to a scoreless draw, seeing Australia earn its first ever World Cup finals point. It would prove be the only FIFA World Cup appearance for Australia until the tournament returned to Germany more than three decades later, in 2006.

=== 1978 FIFA World Cup qualification ===
The 1978 FIFA World Cup qualification saw Australia grouped with New Zealand and Chinese Taipei in the first group round in 1977. After topping their group, Australia progressed to the final round where they would play Iran, South Korea, Kuwait and Hong Kong who all won their respected groups in the previous round. The teams would play a series of home and away matches with the overall winner gaining qualifying to the 1978 FIFA World Cup. After playing eight matches, Australia managed only three wins, a draw and four losses, resulting in their elimination from the qualifying campaign.

=== 1980 Oceania Cup ===
Despite being heavily involved in the formation of the Oceania Football Confederation (OFC), Australia did not enter the 1973 Oceania Cup due to the Australian Soccer Federation attempting, unsuccessfully, to become aligned with the Asia Football Confederation. Australia selected a young team for the 1980 Oceania Cup. Australia comfortably qualified for the final, with three wins in the group stage. Their second win of the group stage, an 11–2 defeat of Papua New Guinea, was the only match of the tournament recorded as a full international match. Australia defeated Tahiti 4–2 in the final to win their first continental title.

=== 1982 FIFA World Cup qualification ===
Australia's 1982 FIFA World Cup qualification was short lived. A series of home and away group matches in 1981, against New Zealand, Indonesia Chinese Taipei and Fiji saw Australia second-bested by New Zealand. After eight matches, including four wins, two draws and two losses, Australia bowed out to New Zealand.

=== 1986 FIFA World Cup qualification ===
The 1986 FIFA World Cup qualification began in 1985, with Australia grouped against Israel, New Zealand and Chinese Taipei in the Oceanian zone. Australia advanced after topping the group in six matches, winning four, drawing two and losing none.

Australia then had to compete in a home-and-away intercontinental play-off against Scotland, with the winner gaining qualification to the 1986 FIFA World Cup. The match against Scotland would also be Sir Alex Ferguson's national coaching debut, taking over Jock Stein's position after he collapsed and died from a heart attack at the end of the Scotland's previous qualifying match against Wales. In the first leg of the play-off, played in Glasgow on 20 November 1985, Scotland took the lead in the 53rd minute from a twenty-yard free kick. The second goal arrived in the 59th minute. The second leg played in Melbourne on 4 December, finished goalless which was enough for Scotland to better Australia, advancing with an aggregate score of 2–0.

=== 1988 Seoul Olympics ===
Australia's path to the 1988 Seoul Olympics started with the Oceania qualifying series against Taiwan, New Zealand and Israel. Australia, the eventual winner of this series qualified automatically for the finals in Seoul on 27 March 1988. For the Olympic Games, coach Frank Arok had comfortably chosen a strong squad, consisting of ex-Nottingham Forest defender Alan Davidson and Sydney Olympic striker John Kosmina. The squad also included Graham Arnold, Frank Farina and Charlie Yankos. Australia would participate in Group D, where they were drawn against Brazil, Yugoslavia and Nigeria. 12,000 spectators in Seoul saw Frank Farina fire past Yugoslavian keeper Dragoje Leković on 48 minutes to claim a 1–0 victory in their opening group stage clash. Australia then took on Brazil which saw a hat-trick from Romario to defeat the Olyroos 3–0. A 76-minute goal from John Kosmina against Nigeria saw Australia advance to the knock-out stages, where the 1–0 victory saw them finish in second place of their group. Drawn against the Soviet Union, after a scoreless first half, Australia were beaten 3-0 thanks to two goals in the space of four minutes from Dynamo Moscow midfielder Igor Dobrovolski and another by Dynamo Kiev midfielder Alexei Mikhailichenko on 62 minutes. Australia's David Mitchell saw red on 68 minutes as Australia would be eliminated. The 1988 tournament would be the last Olympic Games before the under-23 age restriction, resulting in the Australia under-23 team competing instead.

In July 1988, Australia defeated Argentina 4–1 in the Bicentennial Gold Cup.

=== 1990 FIFA World Cup qualification ===
Australia's 1990 FIFA World Cup qualification began in the first round with a home-and-away match against Fiji in December 1988, which Australia won with a 5–2 aggregate score. Australia then progressed to the second round where in mid-1989, they competed against Israel and New Zealand for an intercontinental play-off spot. Australia only loss to New Zealand was enough to see them come second in the group to Israel, New Zealand came third. Israel progressed and Australia was eliminated.

== 1991–2003: Rise in Australia ==
=== 1994 FIFA World Cup qualification ===
Australia's road to USA 94 is an example of the difficult qualifying path which members of the Oceania confederation have had to endure. In order to qualify for USA 94, Australia had to win one group stage and then three playoff stages. The first stage was the Oceania playoff. Australia finished on top of Group 1 in Oceania going undefeated in four games against weaker sides Tahiti and the Solomon Islands and scoring thirteen goals over the four games. Australia played New Zealand in the Oceania playoff. The first leg was played in New Zealand on 30 May 1993, with Australia winning the game 1–0. Australia won the return leg 3–0 to win the playoff stage with a 4–0 aggregate score. Having won the Oceania playoff, Australia now had to win a 2-leg playoff against Canada, the CONCACAF runner up. The first leg was played in Canada on 31 July 1993, with the Canadians winning the 1st leg 2–1. In the second leg, which was played on 15 August 1993 in Sydney, Australia managed a 2–1 win which saw the game go into extra time after a 3–3 aggregate scoreline. The game went into a penalty shootout which was won by Australia 4–1.

Australia then qualified for the 2-leg playoff against the South American group 1 runner up, Argentina—runners-up from the 1990 World Cup, and ranked 9th in the world at that time. The first leg was played in Sydney on 31 October 1993. The 1st leg ended with a 1–1 draw. On 17 November 1993, the second leg was played in Argentina, with Argentina winning 1–0 and denying Australia a place at the 1994 World Cup in the United States. After the game Argentine legend Diego Maradona was so impressed with the Australian team's performance that he said to then captain Paul Wade "Your tears of pain, will one day be tears of joy".

=== 1997 FIFA Confederations Cup ===
The team's previously poor record in World Cup qualification was not reflected in their reasonable performances at the 1997 FIFA Confederations Cup. Australia drew with Brazil 0–0 in the group stage and then defeated Uruguay 1–0 in the semi-finals to reach the 1997 FIFA Confederations Cup Final.

=== 1998 FIFA World Cup qualification ===
In 1997 Australia failed to qualify for the World Cup finals despite being undefeated in the qualifying rounds. After winning the OFC qualifying tournament, Australia had to play Iran over two legs in one week, with the winner progressing to the World Cup finals to be held in France. Australia, under coach Terry Venables, tied the away leg 1–1 and looked like they were going to proceed to the finals in France, initially leading 2–0 in the home game in Melbourne, until Iran managed to score two late goals to tie the game and progress to the finals on the away goals rule. This match has been named one of the most memorable matches by many of the retired Australian and Iranian soccer players. At the time the crowd that packed the MCG (~98,000) was the highest ever for a soccer match in Australia.

=== 2001 FIFA Confederations Cup ===
In 2001, after a victory against France in the group stage, Australia finished the 2001 FIFA Confederations Cup in 3rd place after defeating Brazil 1–0 in the Bronze Final.

Australia also drew with France 1–1 in Melbourne in November 2001. Another highlight for Australian soccer was the 3–1 victory over England in a friendly in London in 2003.

=== 2002 FIFA World Cup qualification ===
In 2001 Australia again won the qualifying tournament for 2002 FIFA World Cup. Second and third-string line-ups thrashed a number of tiny island nations in a competition that made a mockery of the Confederation, including a world-record 22–0 win against Tonga, then smashed that record with a 31–0 win over American Samoa only two days later. Still missing Harry Kewell and Mark Viduka, Australia comfortably beat New Zealand, their only real threat in the Oceania confederation. Australia then once again had to win a two leg playoff in November, in order to advance to the World Cup finals to be held in South Korea and Japan.

On this occasion the opposition was the fifth-placed South American team, Uruguay. In the preceding four months Uruguay's preparation had been six World Cup qualifying matches, as follows: beat second-ranked Brazil 1:0; drew 1:1 with eighth-ranked Colombia; drew 1:1 with second-ranked Argentina. In contrast, Australia's preparation had included no qualifying games since two matches in 4 days in June, against 81st-ranked New Zealand, although had played two friendly matches – a loss to Japan in August and a 1:1 draw with France in November.

In the first leg in Melbourne, Australia won 1–0 after Kevin Muscat scored from a penalty kick; however, Australia's qualification campaign ended unsuccessfully as they lost 3–0 in the away leg in Montevideo just five days later with the South Americans proving too strong.

== 2004–06: Return to the World Cup ==
=== 2006 FIFA World Cup qualification ===
In 2004, the team took the first steps towards qualification for the 2006 FIFA World Cup by topping the round-robin stage of the OFC World Cup qualification tournament. The team drew 2–2 with the Solomon Islands, which combined with other results put that team ahead of New Zealand in the standings and meaning that the Solomon Islands qualified for the final playoff rather than the expected New Zealand.

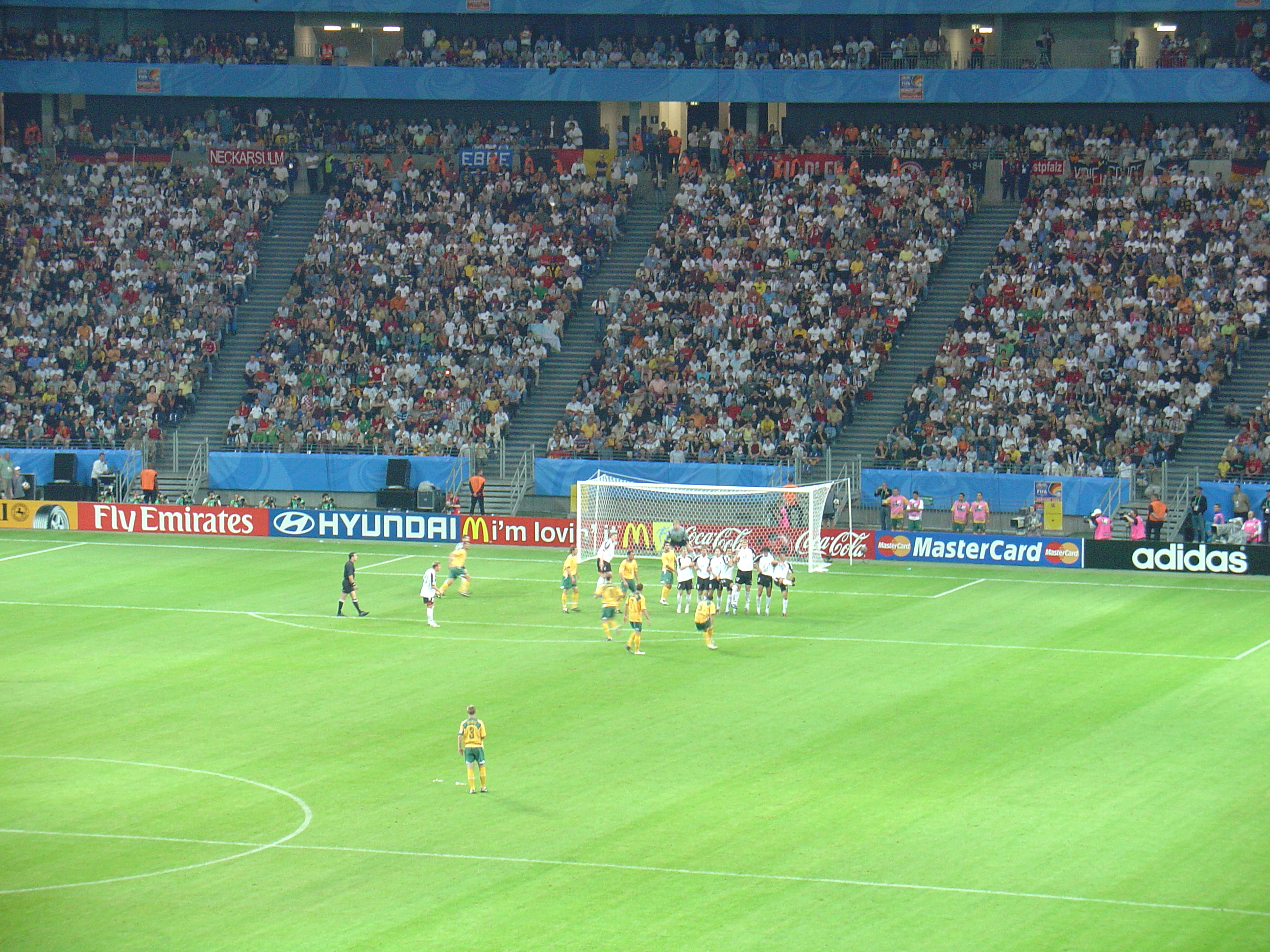
Australia v Germany in the 2005 FIFA Confederations Cup

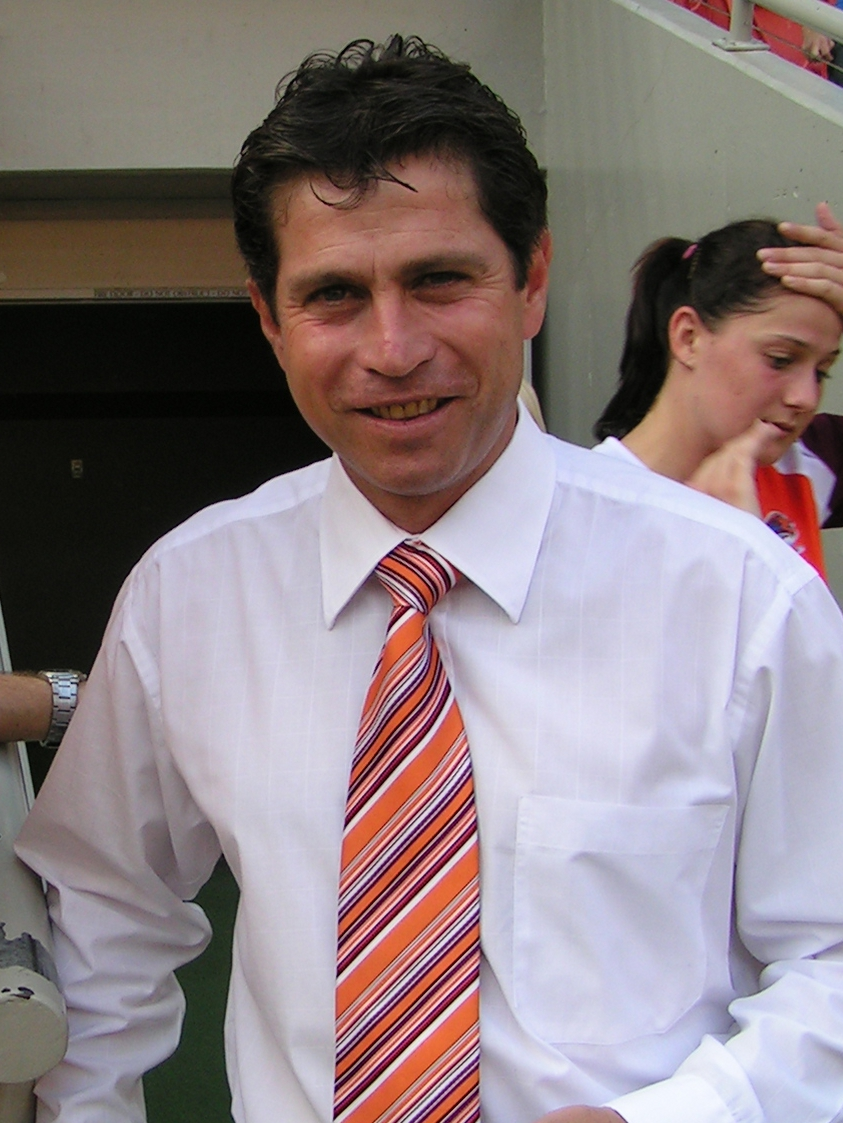
Frank Farina, the manager of Australia from 1999 to 2005.

Coach Frank Farina stood down from the position by "mutual consent" on 29 June 2005 after Australia failed to win a game at the 2005 Confederations Cup, citing ever increasing speculation over his position. On 22 July, Guus Hiddink was announced by FIFA as the new national coach. This announcement came after intense speculation by the Australian media over potential candidates and even a premature announcement from Hiddink himself. Hiddink combined his roles as manager of Dutch club PSV Eindhoven with that of Australia, and remained the coach of Australia until the end of the Australian team's 2006 World Cup campaign, after which he accepted a position coaching Russia.

After some initial training sessions with the Australian team in the Netherlands, his first campaign as national coach resulted in an 11–1 aggregate win over the Solomon Islands in the OFC Qualifying Tournament Final. The remaining task for Hiddink and Australia was the Oceania–South America play-off against the fifth-placed team from the CONMEBOL qualifying tournament for a place in the World Cup.

Australia, ranked No. 49, then moved on to play 18th ranked Uruguay in a rematch of the qualifying matches in 2001. Again, there was a huge contrast in preparation. Australia had only two recent qualifying matches, against #138 Solomon Islands, only three days apart. Uruguay's preparation had included four qualifying matches, in the previous two months, including: beaten #26 Colombia, drawn with #33 Ecuador, and beaten #4 Argentina.

Fearing a repeat of security problems which occurred in Montevideo in 2001, Australia announced that they would hold their training sessions in Buenos Aires, Argentina, and would only stay in Montevideo for the game. Uruguay called for the first leg to be moved a day earlier, to 11 November. This idea was rejected by Australia. As a result, Uruguay had announced that they had moved the kick off time back five hours to 9:00 pm local time on 12 November. This meant that Australia would miss their direct flight back to Sydney for the second leg. This would also mean that Uruguay would have an extra day of preparation for the second leg.

However, this plan backfired on the Uruguayans. Their plans to charter a plane for a direct flight to Sydney fell through (they ended up flying over in economy class seating on a regular commercial flight). When Uruguay asked to move the kickoff back, Australia, which by that time had arranged, with their sponsor Qantas, a specially fitted out 767 (which included massage tables, and much room and space) for immediately after the game, refused. Eventually, FIFA stepped in and ordered the kickoff moved back to 6:00 pm local time.

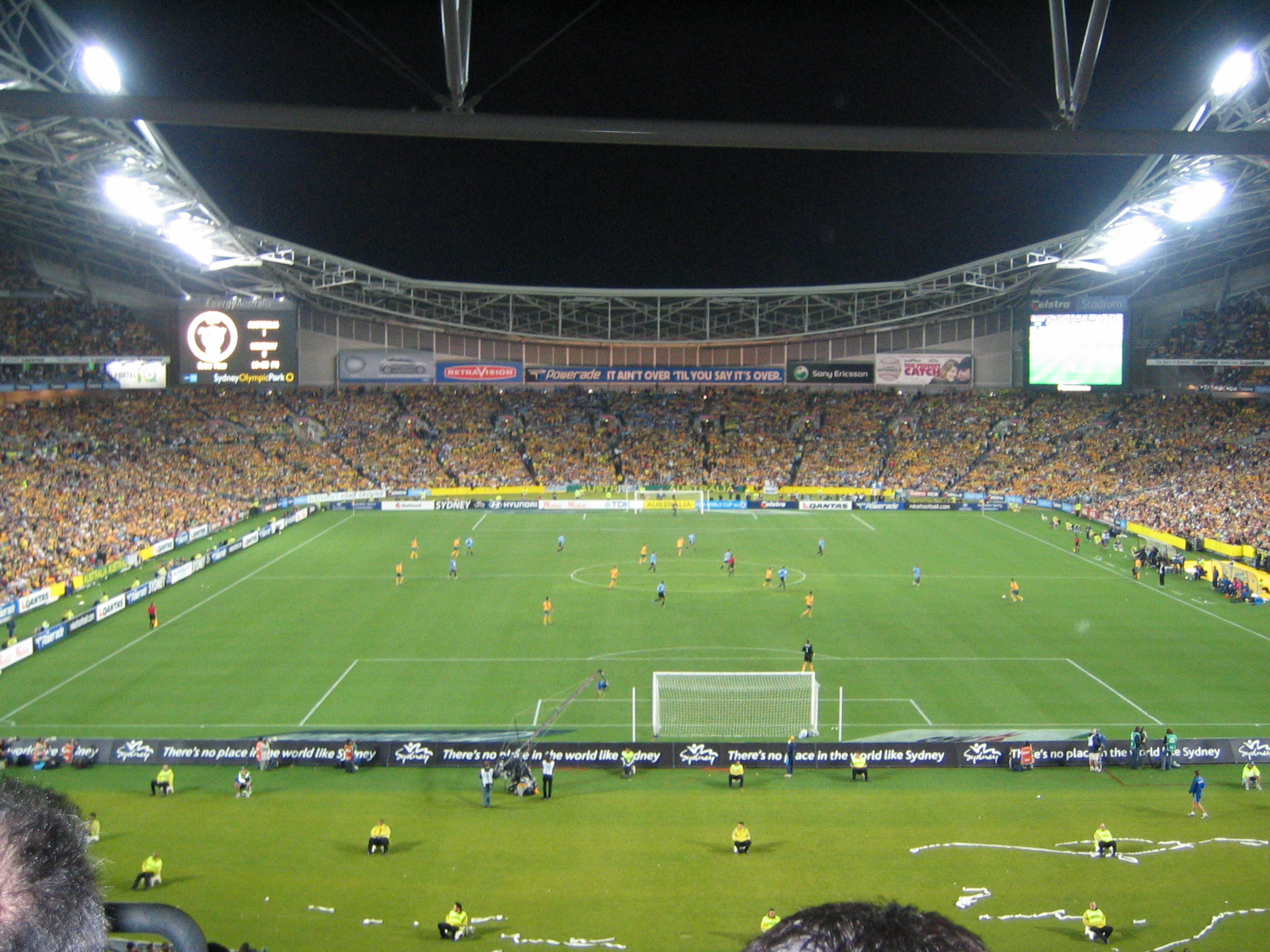
Australia v Uruguay at Stadium Australia in 2005; the match is in the second period of extra time.

Uruguay defeated Australia 1–0 in Montevideo on 12 November 2005, after a header from Darío Rodríguez. Australia had the better of their Uruguayan opponents for a lot of the match, but they could not capitalise on their opportunities. In Sydney, on 16 November for the second leg of the qualifying series and in front of 82,698 fans at Telstra Stadium, Australia led Uruguay 1–0 after 90 minutes following a goal by Mark Bresciano in the first half. The aggregate was tied, and extra time was played. Neither team scored after two periods of extra time, bringing the game to a penalty shootout. Australia won the penalty shootout 4–2, making Australia the first ever team to qualify for a World Cup via a penalty shootout. Australian goalkeeper Mark Schwarzer made two saves and John Aloisi scored the winning penalty.

The resulting win led to scenes of celebration across the country, as Australia qualifying for the 2006 FIFA World Cup in Germany, their first qualification in 32 years.

=== Acceptance into the AFC ===
Many commentators and fans felt that the only way for Australia to progress was to abandon the Oceania Football Confederation. Soccer had developed over time to place increasing importance on tournaments rather than friendly matches. This established the Continental championships and their qualifiers as the major source of competitive matches for national teams. This served to starve Australia of potential opponents and resulted in long gaps between fixtures for the national team.

Soccer broadcaster and former Australian captain Johnny Warren, expressed his desire for Australia to join Asia. Despite previous attempts to do so, each notoriously ending in failure, a story was leaked from Tokyo in March 2005 suggesting that FIFA had entered into secret discussions with the AFC on this very issue. On 23 March, the AFC Executive Committee made a unanimous decision to invite Australia to join the AFC.

AFC President, Mohammed bin Hammam, outlined reasons for this decision.

As well as being a developed football nation, Australia brings a developed economy and this is actually what we want in football. Besides Japan, Korea, China and Saudi Arabia if Australia joins the benefits are huge, this is what we're after.

On 17 April, the OFC executive committee unanimously endorsed Australia's proposed move. FIFA approved the move on 30 June, and it took effect on 1 January 2006. Earlier, on 1 December, the AFC Executive Committee announced that Australia would be put into the ASEAN Football Federation (AFF) zone.

Australia was duly entered into the 2007 AFC Asian Cup qualification. Australia was drawn into group D, alongside Bahrain, Lebanon and Kuwait. Lebanon later withdrew due to military conflict in the area. On 22 February 2006, Australia played and won (3–1) their first qualifying match against Bahrain, the first game as a member of the AFC for Australia. They subsequently qualified for the 2007 AFC Asian Cup on 16 August after defeating Kuwait 2–0.

=== 2006 FIFA World Cup preparation ===
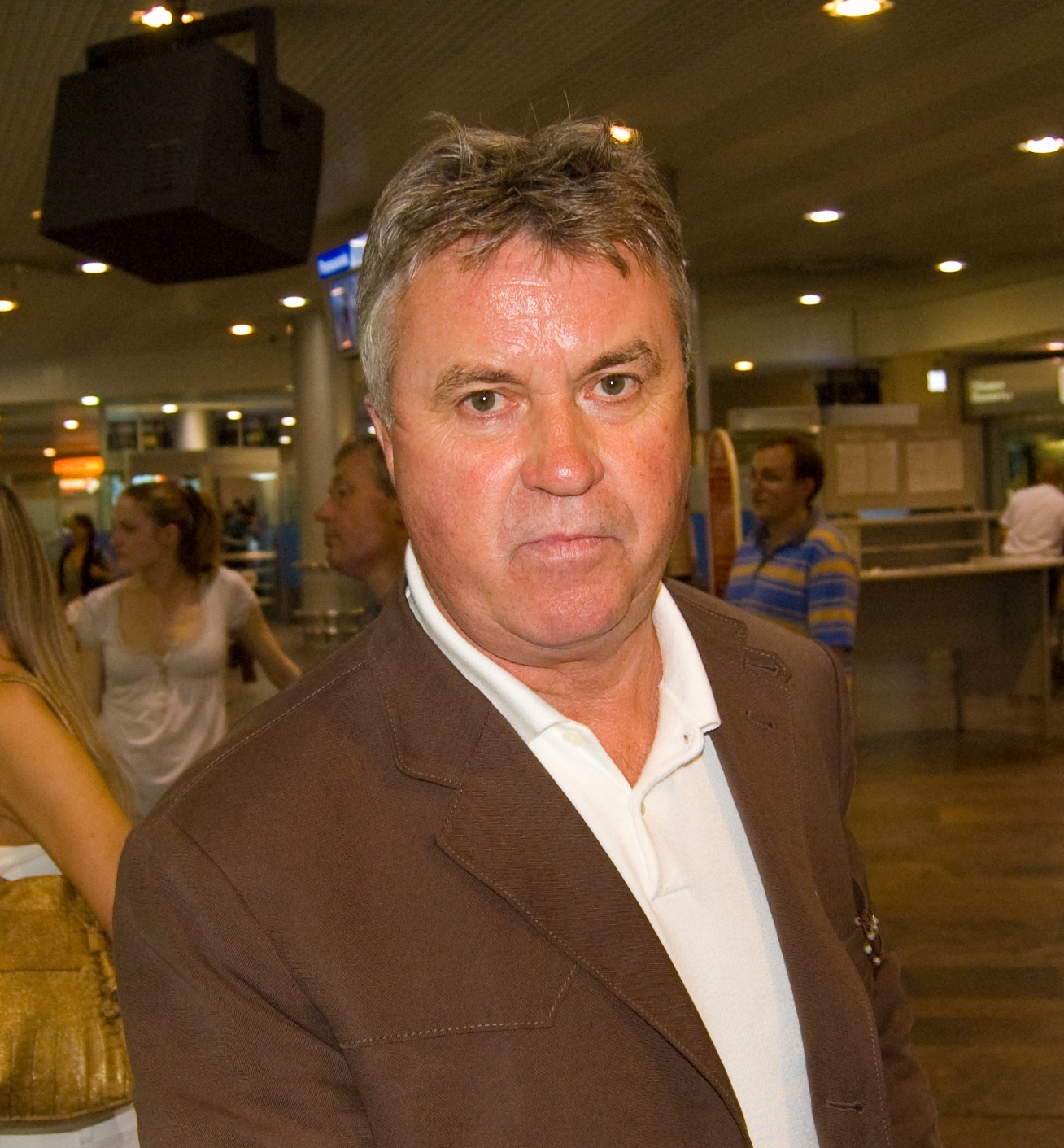
Guus Hiddink, the manager of Australia from 2005 to 2006

Australia was placed into 2006 World Cup Group F, along with Japan, Croatia and defending champions Brazil.

In late December 2005, Coach Guus Hiddink appointed former Dutch player, Johan Neeskens, as Assistant Coach, to work alongside Graham Arnold, Ron Smith, Tony Franken and Anthony Crea.

On 13 February 2006, Australia launched a new home and away strip for the World Cup. The home strip, similar to the 1974 outfit, is an entirely yellow shirt with green shorts. The away strip is entirely obsidian blue with yellow trimmings (the heraldic colours of Australia). The jerseys were launched at a lavish ceremony at the Berlin Olympic Stadium in Berlin. On 17 March 2006, the FIFA World Cup trophy visited Sydney on its tour around the world.

While the team was preparing for the World Cup, Australia player Tony Vidmar was ruled out after being diagnosed with a heart condition. In all, the squad that won the qualification matches saw 5 changes in the lead-up the World Cup finals. Joel Griffiths, Ahmad Elrich, Ljubo Milicevic, Tony Vidmar and Michael Thwaite were replaced by Joshua Kennedy, Mile Sterjovski, Michael Beauchamp, Craig Moore and Mark Milligan respectively.

As part of a national support effort, the television network SBS ran a competition, "Song for the Socceroos", in order to select a World Cup anthem for Australia. The winning song "Green and Gold" was announced on 16 May.

On 25 May 2006 in Melbourne, Australia played a friendly against Greece, then current European Champions, and ranked No. 20 in FIFA rankings. Australia won 1–0 thanks to a Josip Skoko volley early on in the match. The match, at the 100,000 capacity Melbourne Cricket Ground, was sold out in only 2 hours, and was a great sendoff for Australia from home soil, despite the questionable quality of the Greek performance.

Australia played the Netherlands in a friendly match in Rotterdam on 4 June. The Dutch, ranked No. 3 in the world, went ahead in the 9th minute after goalkeeper Mark Schwarzer parried a Ruud van Nistelrooy shot, Australia failed to clear the ball and van Nistelrooy scored with a follow-up strike. Australia's Tim Cahill equalised in the 53rd minute following a goal-line scramble after Mark Viduka hit the crossbar from a penalty kick. The match ended in a 1–1 draw. The only blemish was the dismissal of defender Luke Wilkshire in the 61st minute, after a wild challenge on Giovanni van Bronckhorst. The next day, the national team left for Germany.

Australia played a final pre-World Cup friendly against 123rd-ranked Liechtenstein on 7 June. Defender Lucas Neill headed an own goal in the 8th minute, giving Liechtenstein the lead until Mile Sterjovski equalised in the 20th. Australia struggled to gain a lead on their opponents until the final 15 minutes when a goal each from Joshua Kennedy and John Aloisi won Australia the game 3–1.

=== 2006 FIFA World Cup ===
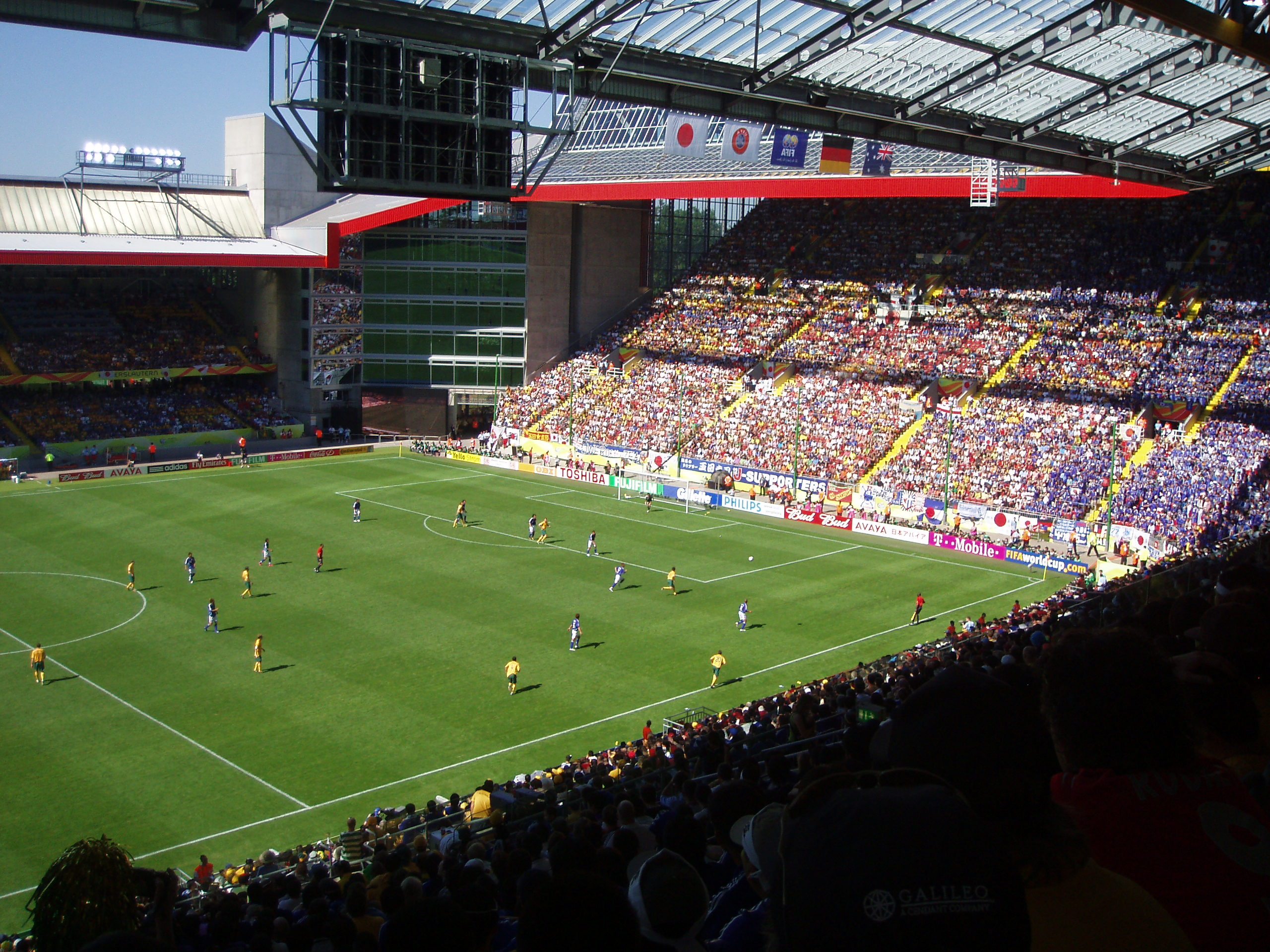
Australia v Japan at the 2006 FIFA World Cup

On 12 June, Australia defeated Japan 3–1 in their opening game in Kaiserslautern, with Tim Cahill scoring two goals (84', 89') and John Aloisi scoring one (92+') in the last eight minutes to claim their first World Cup finals victory. An early controversial call by Egyptian referee Essam Abdel-Fatah, that awarded a goal (26') to Shunsuke Nakamura, despite an apparent foul to Australian goalkeeper Mark Schwarzer, had the Australians playing catch-up until the last eight minutes. Schwarzer and Viduka claimed that Abd El Fatah apologised over allowing Nakamura's goal to stand after the incident, admitting he had made a mistake, although Abd El Fatah later denied making an apology and said that "FIFA's refereeing committee... agreed unanimously that Japan's goal against Australia was correct." Both Cahill and Aloisi came in as substitutes in the second half of the game. Their goals were the first ever scored by Australia in the World Cup Finals, and Australia became the first team in the 2006 tournament to come back after being 1–0 down. Also, no other team has scored three goals in the last seven minutes of a match in World Cup finals history.

On 18 June, hours before Australia's second game against world champions Brazil, a British newspaper claimed that several Australian players had placed bets amongst themselves, which was said to be against FIFA regulations. Tim Cahill admitted that teammates Lucas Neill and Archie Thompson bet that Cahill would score the first ever Australian goal at the World Cup. Mark Viduka also said that the players were taking bets on who was going to be the first to score, and that goalkeeper Zeljko Kalac was the bookmaker. FIFA have since cleared all players of any wrongdoing, by interpreting their regulations as referring to betting with professional bookmakers, rather than betting within a team.

Australia met Brazil in their second Group F game in Munich on 18 June. The Australians held Brazil to a 0–0 half time scoreline before Adriano put Brazil in front (49'). Brazil substitute Fred scored (90') with the help of substitute Robinho to give Brazil a 2–0 win, which saw the Brazilians go through to the second round.

A day later, following the Brazil game, Harry Kewell was in hot water after an altercation with the referee from the Brazil game. FIFA announced that it would investigate the incident. On 20 June, charges were dismissed against Kewell due to "inconsistent reporting by match officials", allowing him to play the next game against Croatia.

On 22 June, Australia faced Croatia in Stuttgart. The final score was 2–2. A goal from Darijo Srna in the second minute put Australia on the back foot. Australia equalised with a penalty goal from Craig Moore (38') after Croatian defender Stjepan Tomas handballed near the Croatian goal. Niko Kovač gave Croatia a 2–1 lead after halftime before Australia equalised again through Harry Kewell (79') in a moment described by SBS broadcast commentator Simon Hill as "well, it just had to be Harry". Kewell appeared to be offside for the goal, in a match riddled with errors. The referee Graham Poll dismissed calls for a penalty in the 5th minute when Croatia's Josip Šimunić appeared to wrestle striker Mark Viduka to the ground near goal. Despite penalising Croatia for Stjepan Tomas' handball in the 39th minute, he failed to penalise Tomas for exactly the same deed in the 75th minute, when Australia were trying to equalise again. Towards the end of the match, Poll blew the final whistle at the moment that John Aloisi scored what would have been a winning goal, and then blew the final whistle again, before presenting Simunic with three yellow cards and then sending him off after the final whistle. Poll issued eight yellow cards resulting in three expulsions. Brett Emerton was sent off for his second bookable offence (although he was already suspended for the next match for receiving his second yellow card of the group stage earlier in the match). The Daily Telegraph reported on 25 June that Graham Poll was dismissed from World Cup refereeing duties by FIFA, who claimed that his mistake was "unacceptable". As Brazil beat Japan 4–1, Australia proceeded to the next round to face Italy.

On 26 June, Australia met Italy in Kaiserslautern. Kewell was unavailable for the game, entering the stadium on crutches reportedly suffering from an attack of gout and infected blisters (later diagnosed as septic arthritis). The score at half-time was 0–0. Italy went down to 10 men due to the red card (51') given to Marco Materazzi for a two-footed tackle on Mark Bresciano. Otherwise, six yellow cards were issued in total. Almost three minutes into stoppage time, with the score still at 0–0 and Australia being pushed into their own half, a controversial penalty was awarded to Italy when Fabio Grosso fell under a Lucas Neill challenge in the final seconds of the match. Francesco Totti scored from the spot (95') and the game ended immediately with Australia eliminated. Australian assistant coach Graham Arnold branded the penalty a "joke", to the agreement of several Australian players, including Tim Cahill, who believed Grosso should have been cautioned for diving. Coach Guus Hiddink officially ended his reign as the coach of the Australian national team following the 1–0 loss to Italy and took the managerial job with Russia. Had Australia defeated Italy, the Socceroos would have progressed to a quarter-final tie with Ukraine. With Italy dismantling the side 3–0, many pundits and fans of Australia believed that the team could have reached the semi-finals of the tournament, a feat not achieved by an Asian team since Guus Hiddink's South Korea in the 2002 edition of the competition. Nevertheless, the success achieved at the 2006 World Cup later saw the team named AFC National Team of the Year, as well as being dubbed the "golden generation" in the history of the Australia national team.

== 2007–13: Entering the Asian Football Confederation ==
=== 2007 AFC Asian Cup ===
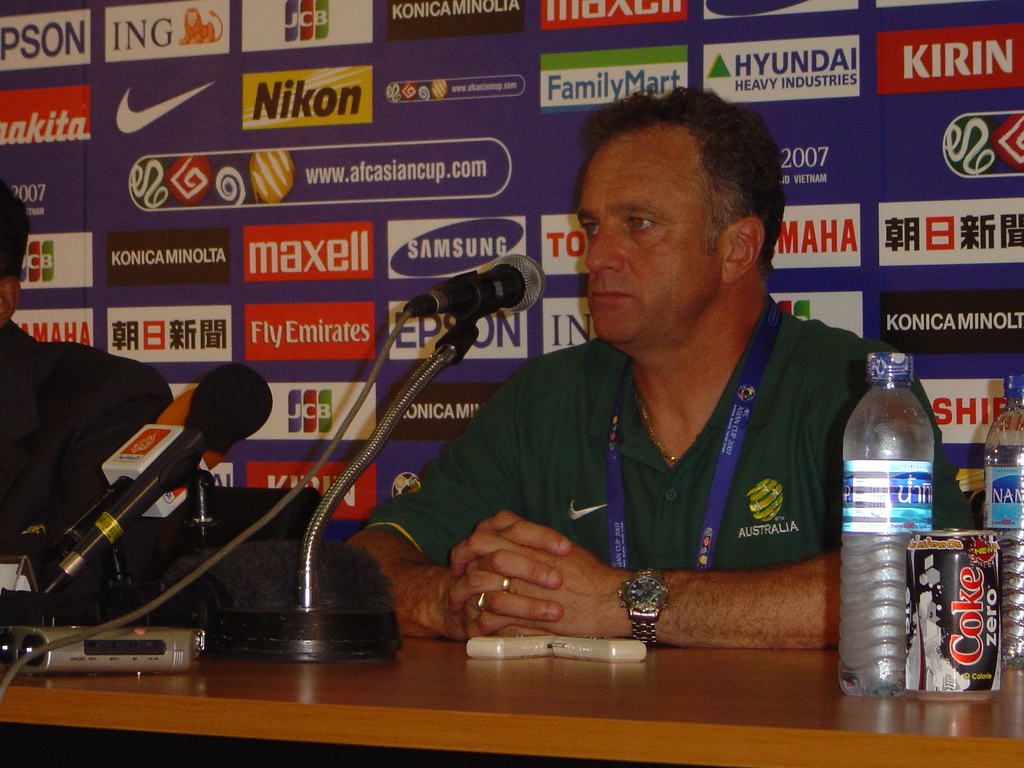
After originally serving as an assistant coach, Graham Arnold was promoted to manager of Australia after the departure of Guus Hiddink. He oversaw Australia's unsuccessful 2007 AFC Asian Cup campaign

Australia, led by Graham Arnold, went to their first Asian Cup in 2007, sending a strong squad which included 15 players from the 2006 FIFA World Cup. Australia was drawn in Group A alongside (co-host) Thailand, Oman and Iraq.

In their first match, Australia were only able to earn a 1–1 draw against a lower-ranked Oman team. Australia played poorly, with Oman leading for most of the match after Badar Al-Maimani scored in the 32nd minute, but were once again saved by Tim Cahill who scored a late equaliser in the 92nd minute after coming on as a substitute in the second half.

Australia lost their second group match 3–1 to eventual Asian Cup winners Iraq, with Lucas Neill receiving a red card (90'), following two yellow cards. Mark Viduka scored the lone goal for the Australians in the 47th minute of the match which at that point in the game was the equaliser but Iraq scored another two goals to win.

In the third match of the group stage, Australia defeated Thailand 4–0 with Mark Viduka scoring two goals, with Michael Beauchamp and Harry Kewell scoring one goal each. The victory assured Australia's progression to the quarter final stage of the tournament.

After drawing 1–1 with Japan after extra time, Australia exited the tournament on penalties at the quarter final stage. The first two Australian penalty kicks were both unsuccessful by Harry Kewell and Lucas Neill with Australia eventually bowing out 4–3 to end their inaugural participation in Asia's most prestigious soccer tournament.

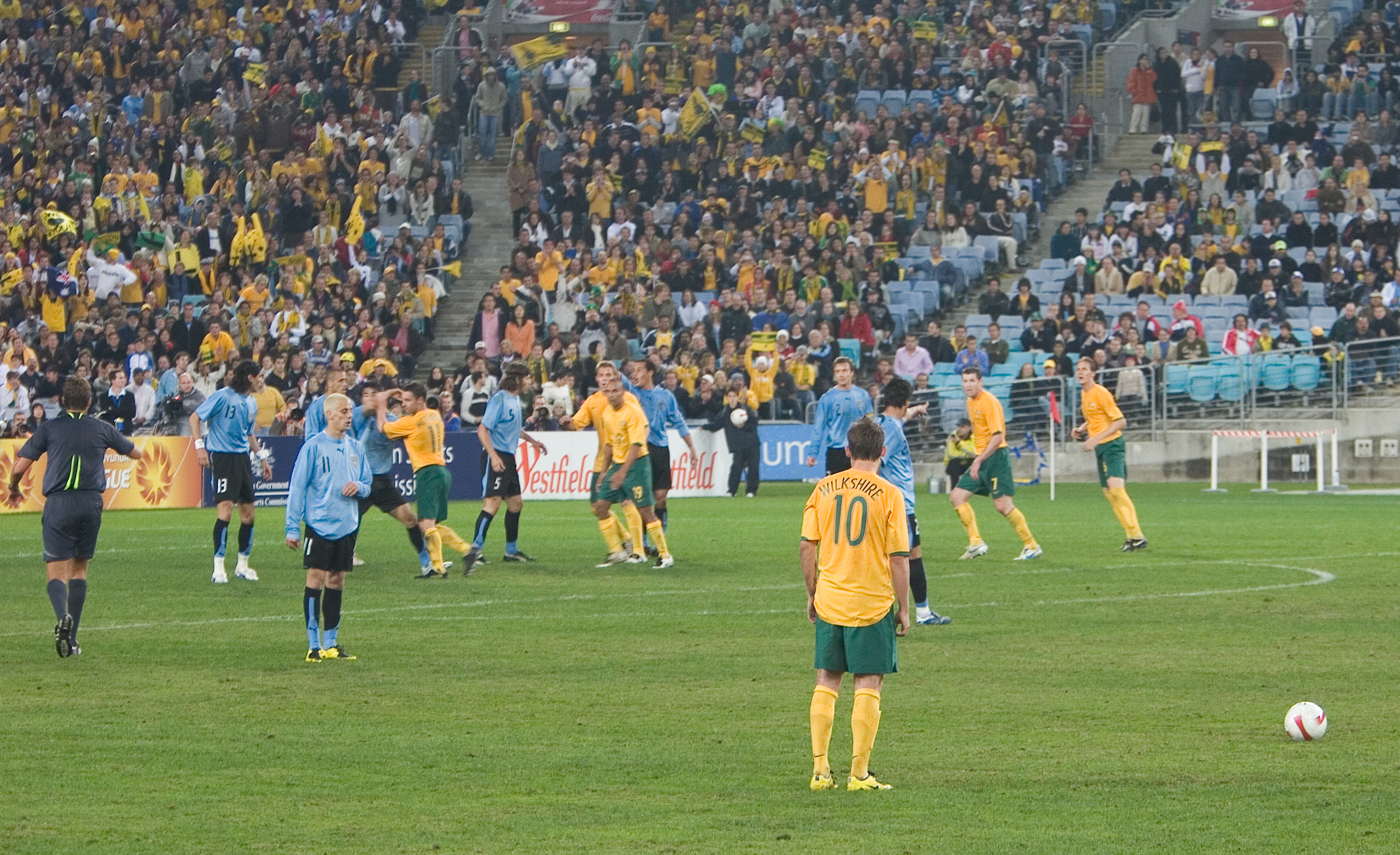
Australia playing Uruguay in June 2007

In a friendly international at the Melbourne Cricket Ground on 11 September 2007, Australia were defeated by Argentina one goal to nil. The friendly was Graham Arnold's last game as head coach. It had been widely speculated that Dutchman Dick Advocaat would take over as Head Coach for Australia's 2010 World Cup Qualifiers by the end of 2007 but he backed out of a contract with the FFA to continue coaching Zenit Petersburg. It has been reported that FFA is considering legal action against both person and club. As a result, Australia's head coach position was left open, with technical director Rob Baan the caretaker for a match against Nigeria at Loftus Road, London (Australia winning 1–0.) The position was filled on 6 December 2007 when the FFA announced Pim Verbeek as the new head coach.

=== 2010 FIFA World Cup qualification ===
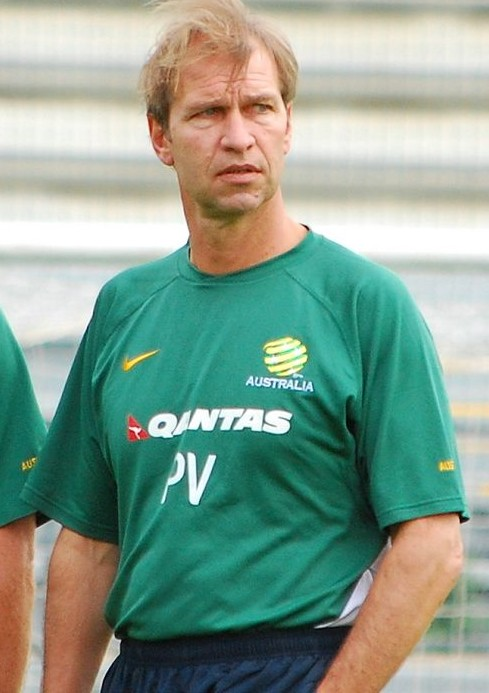
Pim Verbeek was appointed the new manager of Australia in 2007. He guided Australia to qualification to the 2010 FIFA World Cup, and oversaw their unsuccessful World Cup campaign

In February 2009, Australia were seeded to enter the 2010 FIFA World Cup qualification in the third round. They were drawn into a group composed of Qatar, Iraq and China with the media dubbing it the "group of death". Australia's first match began with a home match against Qatar at Docklands Stadium in Melbourne giving Australia a 3–0 victory. This was Pim Verbeek's first competitive match in charge of Australia. The majority of the Australian squad consisted of overseas, mainly European based, players after Pim Verbeek announced the local A-League was not yet up to World Cup standards. A week after the match, Australia moved up to 38th on the FIFA World Rankings. In the second group game, Australia drew 0–0 with China with Mark Schwarzer saving a penalty in the last few minutes. In their third out of six qualifiers on 1 June, Australia beat Iraq () at Brisbane Stadium, Brisbane, 1–0, with a headed goal from Harry Kewell proving the difference between the two teams early in the 2nd half of play. In the return match in Dubai, Iraq defeated Australia 1–0 through a wonder strike from Emad Mohammed. Australia then defeated Qatar 3–1 on 14 June in Doha to progress to the fourth round of the AFC qualifiers. Their final game in 3rd round qualifying ended in a 1–0 home defeat by China.

Australia was drawn alongside Japan, Bahrain, Qatar and Uzbekistan in the fourth round of World Cup qualification, which commenced on 10 September 2008, with a 1–0 victory over the Uzbeks in Tashkent. Scott Chipperfield's run was unmarked and he comfortably headed in a Luke Wilkshire cross. They then proceeded to beat Qatar 4–0 at Suncorp Stadium, Brisbane, to go top of the group, with goals scored by Tim Cahill and Josh Kennedy with Brett Emerton scoring a brace for the home side. The game was delayed 30min (and close to abandoned) after a torrential rainstorm hit Brisbane Stadium prior to the match. Their next match was against Bahrain on 19 November. Australia managed a 1–0 victory despite a brilliant performance by the Bahrainis and a disappointing performance by Australia. Both the Australian coach and players admitted they were lucky to take the points which came courtesy of a Marco Bresciano goal in the 93rd minute. They dedicated the win to Craig Moore who missed the match following surgery for testicular cancer. Australia remained top of the group with 10 points after 4 games following a 0–0 draw away against Japan. Australia was on the brink of qualifying after a convincing 2–0 win over Uzbekistan on 1 April in Sydney. After a lacklustre first half, Australia scored two goals with a Josh Kennedy header in the 66th minute and a Harry Kewell penalty in the 73rd minute after Richard Garcia was taken down in the penalty box. Australia then secured their place in South Africa after holding Qatar 0–0 at Doha on 5 June.

Australia's qualification was already assured before the final two games, both home fixtures. In Sydney on Wednesday 10 June, goals to Mile Sterjovski and David Carney gave Australia a 2–0 victory over Bahrain. Australia's final qualification game ended with a 2–1 victory over Japan, Australia coming back from a goal in the 40th minute by Japan's Marcus Tulio Tanaka with Tim Cahill's equalising header in the 59th minute, and his winning goal 17 minutes later off a Nicky Carle corner. This victory left Australia top of Group A ahead of Japan by 5 clear points.

=== 2010 FIFA World Cup ===
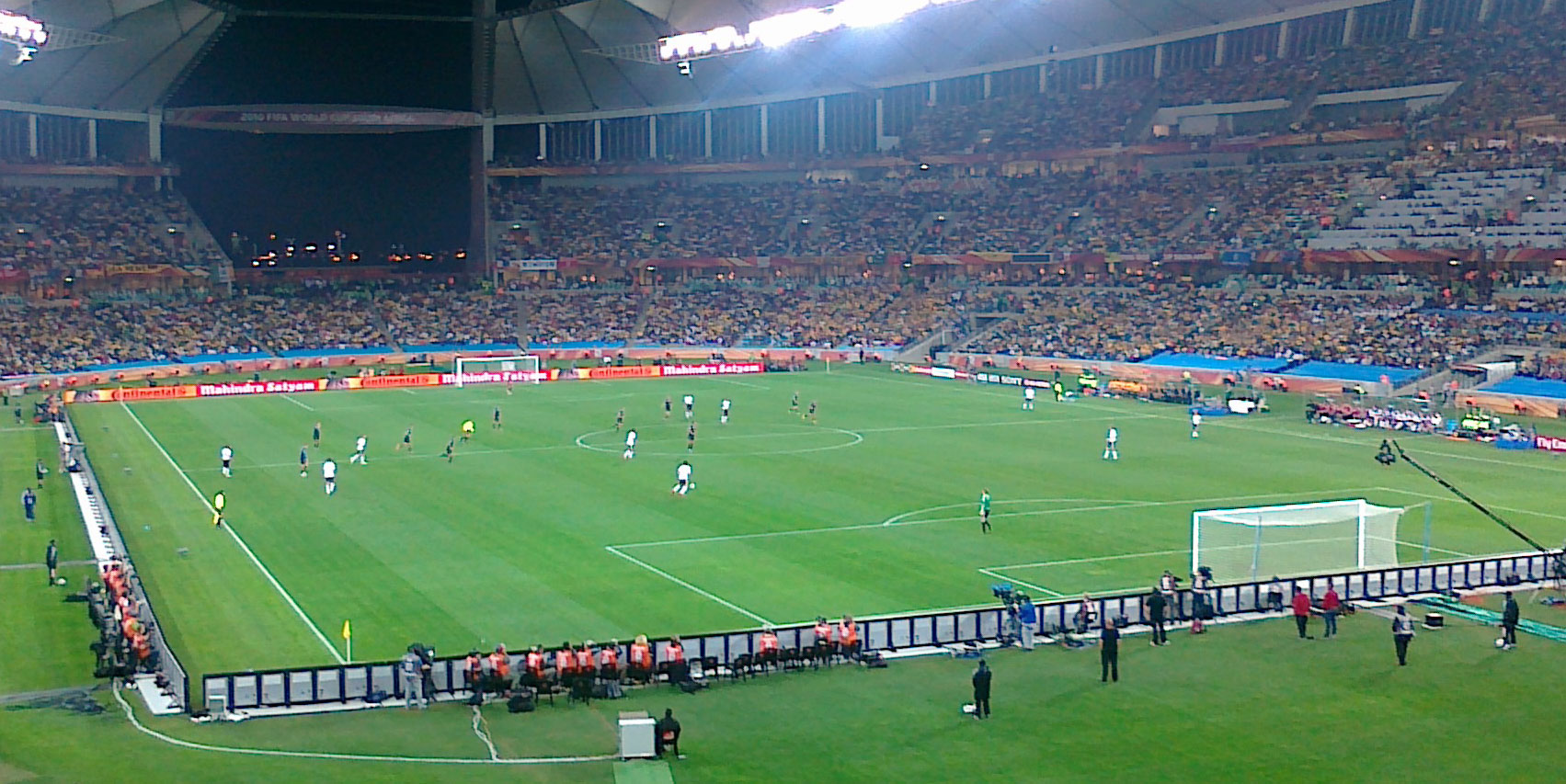
Australia lost 0–4 against Germany in the 2010 FIFA World Cup

Australia were drawn into Group D of the 2010 FIFA World Cup, featuring three-time world champion Germany, Ghana and Serbia.

Prior to leaving for South Africa, Australia played a warm-up game in Melbourne against New Zealand. Australia played poorly with Vince Grella and Tim Cahill both performing dangerous tackles on Leo Bertos which could have earned red cards in competitive fixtures. Despite trailing 1–0 at half-time, Australia managed to equalize through Dario Vidosic in the second half, with Brett Holman scoring the winner in injury time for a 2–1 victory.

In South Africa, Australia played another warm up game against Denmark in Johannesburg and won 1–0, a single goal from towering striker Joshua Kennedy proving to be decisive. Australia's final warm up game before beginning their World Cup campaign was against United States with Australia suffering a 3–1 defeat and Tim Cahill scoring the only goal.

On 14 June 2010, Australia faced Germany in Durban. Pim Verbeek surprisingly chose to play without a recognised striker. Australia were comprehensively defeated 4–0, with goals by Podolski and Klose in the first half, followed by two more goals in the second half after Australia was reduced to ten men, due to Tim Cahill being sent off with a straight red card for a tackle from behind on Bastian Schweinsteiger. Pim Verbeek was heavily criticised for his tactics, with chief SBS soccer analyst Craig Foster calling for his immediate sacking.

Australia's second group match against Ghana resulted in a draw of 1–1. Australia shot its only goal early in the first half by Brett Holman after Ghana's goalkeeper Richard Kingson fumbled the ball following a Mark Bresciano free kick. Shortly after, a goal-bound strike from Ghana's Jonathan Mensah was blocked on the goal line by Harry Kewell's upper arm, resulting in a penalty kick and a straight red card for Kewell. Ghanaian striker Asamoah Gyan scored the equalising goal. Despite the man advantage, Ghana were mostly limited to long-range shots on Australia's goal, and some desperate defending from Australia saw the game finish a draw.

In their final group match against Serbia, Tim Cahill was back from suspension and scored via a header in the second half to allow Australia to go 1–0 up. Only four minutes later, Brett Holman doubled the scoreline to 2–0 with an impressive long-range effort. Late in the second half, Serbia managed to score a late goal through Marko Pantelić after Australian goalkeeper Mark Schwarzer fumbled the ball, and the game ended 2–1. Germany had defeated Ghana 1–0, which meant that both Australia and Ghana finished on 4 points, but Ghana progressed to the knockout stage due to their superior goal difference. Pim Verbeek completed his term as Australian coach at the end of the 2010 World Cup.

=== 2011 AFC Asian Cup qualification ===
In January 2009, Australia began its 2011 AFC Asian Cup qualification in a group with Oman, Kuwait and Indonesia. Australia drew its first match against Indonesia (0–0), lost its second match against Kuwait (1–0), though won its next two matches against Oman (1–0) and (1–2). To progress to the finals in Qatar, Australia would have to finish in the top two teams from their group. In March 2010, after drawing against Kuwait (2–2) and winning its final qualifying group match against Indonesia (1–0), Australia topped Group B with 11 points, Kuwait coming in second with 8 points, Australia progressed through to the 2011 AFC Asian Cup in Qatar.

=== 2011 AFC Asian Cup ===
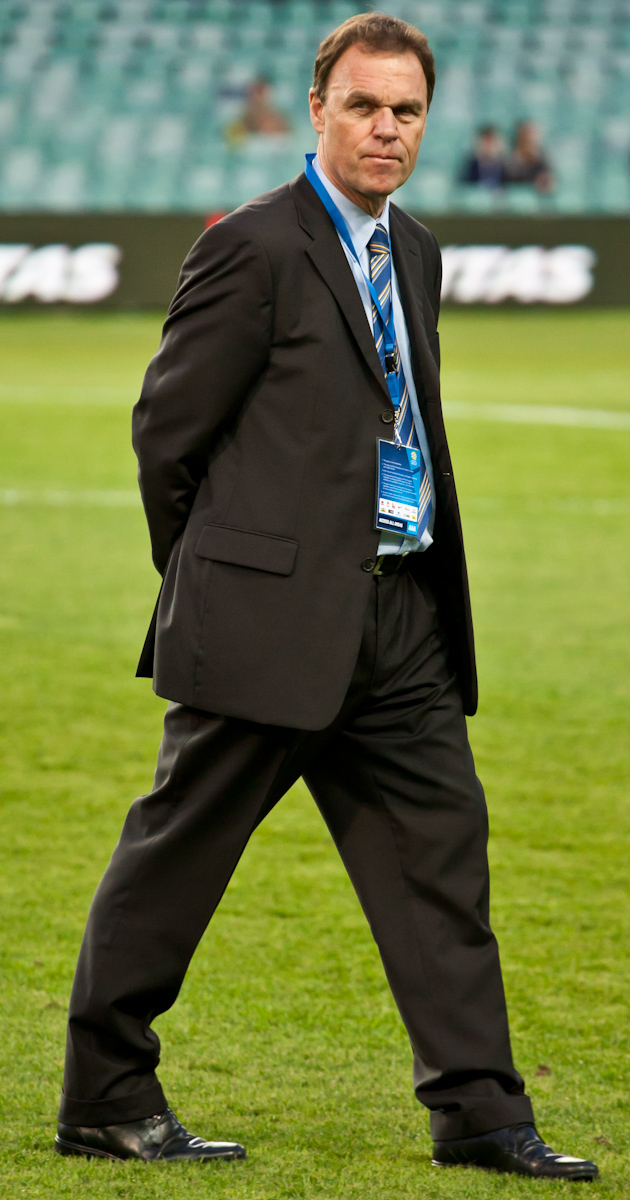
Holger Osieck of Germany was appointed the new manager of Australia in 2010, shortly after the 2010 FIFA World Cup, replacing Pim Verbeek, who stepped down.

In January 2011, after qualifying for the 2011 AFC Asian Cup, Australia were drawn against Bahrain, India and South Korea in Group C. After defeating India (4–0) and drawing with South Korea (1–1), Australia went into the last group match against Bahrain needing only a point to progress. Australia won 1–0 with a Mile Jedinak goal in the 37th minute, topping their group. Australia edged Iraq (1–0) in the quarter-final. The match went into extra time with Harry Kewell heading in a goal in the 117th minute just inside the 18-yard box. Australia went on to defeatUzbekistan (6–0) in the semi-finals to set up a final against Japan on 29 January, which they lost in extra time 1–0, becoming runners-up.

=== 2013 East Asian Cup qualification ===
Australia traveled to Hong Kong in December 2012 to compete in a series of qualification matches with the hopes of qualifying for the 2013 East Asian Cup. Qualification opponents included Hong Kong, North Korea, Guam and Chinese Taipei. Australia started the qualifying campaign on 3 December with an underwhelming 1–0 win over Hong Kong, a team Australia were ranked 139 places higher than on the FIFA World Rankings. The only goal of the game was scored by Brett Emerton in the dying stages of the game. Australia then slumped to a 1–1 draw with North Korea despite Archie Thompson scoring in the first 5 minutes of the match. Australia's third match was played on 7 December against Guam. Despite handing several debuts and fielding in-experienced squad, Australia won 9–0, their biggest win since joining the AFC. Australia needed to beat Chinese Taipei by at least 5 goals in their final match to progress on goal difference. Australia was successful winning 8–0 over the minnows and thus finishing ahead of North Korea and progressing to the 2013 East Asian Cup.

=== 2013 East Asian Cup ===
In July 2013, Australia travelled to South Korea to compete in the 2013 East Asian Cup, which the team qualified for in December 2012. Coach Holger Osieck was praised for his team selection, which included mainly uncapped, inexperienced players; this was done to give experience and development to future international players. In their first match Australia drew against hosts South Korea (0–0), later losing to Japan (3–2) and China (3–4), Australia finished the tournament fourth, in last place.

=== 2014 FIFA World Cup qualification ===
After a number of promising games under new manager, Holger Osieck, including a highly successful 2011 Asian Cup campaign, preparations got underway for the 2014 FIFA World Cup qualification (AFC). The Asian qualifiers began in September and prior to these crucial encounters, FFA organised a number of friendlies against the All Whites, Serbia, Wales and Malaysia. In March 2011, Australia scheduled a game against Germany in Mönchengladbach, and came out victorious defeating them 2–1. On 5 June Australia defeated New Zealand 3–0 in Adelaide. Two days later they drew 0–0 with Serbia in Melbourne. On 31 July, Australia got drawn in Group D along with Saudi Arabia, Oman and Thailand. On 10 August, Australia played Wales in a friendly match in Cardiff, with Australia coming away victorious 2–1. Tim Cahill and Robbie Kruse scored the goals for Australia. The Group stages started on 2 September.

Australia did not start well in their first game at Brisbane Stadium against Thailand and were lucky to eke out the three points after going down 1–0 courtesy of a Teerasil Dangda goal for Thailand. Josh Kennedy and Alex Brosque cancelled out Teerasil's strike to give Australia a 2–1 win. Australia then travelled to Saudi Arabia the match was expected to be Australia's toughest match in the group, but a good performance saw Australia win 3–1 with Josh Kennedy netting twice and Luke Wilkshire converting from the penalty spot. Before the third qualifying match, Australia played Asian minnows Malaysia in Canberra. Given they were in the middle of an Asian qualifying tournament, coach Holger Osieck felt it was better for his team to play against an Asian opponent, instead of a European or South American team. He felt they would get more benefit playing a quick tempo Asian style, as opposed to a stronger, more physical European style. Australia won the match 5–0. Luke Wilkshire scored an early goal, before a double each to Josh Kennedy and Alex Brosque sealed a comfortable win. While the match had its detractors, the hit-out proved necessary. The next match against Oman was to be played in Sydney. Josh Kennedy continued his fantastic goal scoring form with one goal, Mile Jedinak and Brett Holman contributed goals as Australia ran out 3–0 victors. Australia then travelled to Muscat, Oman to play their 4th match in Group D. Many thought that Australia would ease past Oman due to Oman's poor performance in the game in Sydney but Oman stunned Australia winning 1–0 in a tightly contested match in which Australia were disallowed a goal which many thought should have counted. The Australian team then proceeded to defeat Thailand 1–0 at home which ensured that they will top the group and thus qualify for the next round of qualifying with 1 game to spare in the third round. In their last game of the third round of 2014 Asian World Cup Qualification Australia hosted Saudi Arabia at AAMI Park in Melbourne. It was a dead rubber with Australia already qualified for the fourth round so Holger Oseick fielded a number of returning fringe players such as: James Troisi, Mark Milligan, Jade North and Mark Bresciano. The Saudis took the lead through Al Dawsari and were dominating when Australia equalised through Alex Brosque but the Saudis took the lead into half time when Al Shamrani scored to give the Saudis a 2–1 lead. Then Australia came out stronger in the second half and a 3 goals in 3 minutes from Alex Brosque, Harry Kewell and Brett Emerton gave Australia a 4–2 lead which they held to finish the game victors by 2 goals.

In the final qualification stage, Australia was drawn with Japan, Oman, Iraq and Jordan. Australia started with a 0–0 draw against Oman away. This followed with a 1–1 draw with Japan at home, with a Luke Wilkshire penalty earning a point. After a 3–0 win in a friendly match against Lebanon, Australia were shocked 2-1 by Jordan away, leaving Australia fourth from fifth in the group with only 2 points in 3 games. After these performances, Australia dropped to 34th on the FIFA World Rankings, the lowest rank since 2007. Australia responded to this however, defeating Iraq 2–1 away with late goals to Tim Cahill and Archie Thompson, moving them into 2nd position with five points. On 26 March 2013 Australia drew 2–2 with Oman in Sydney. The Aussies were disappointed with the result despite coming from 2 goals down during the match. As Jordan upset Japan later in the day, Australia dropped to 3rd in the table with 6 points from 5 games, with Jordan and Japan above them on 7 and 13 respectively. On 4 June 2013, Australia played Japan in a match which could have seen Japan secure a position in the World Cup. Only after a late goal in the 81st minute by Tommy Oar did Japan score from a penalty during extra-time. Australia's final two games of the round were both home games, the first, against Jordan, finishing Australia's way 4–0. In their last game Joshua Kennedy scored a late 83rd-minute goal, the win securing Australia a position in the World Cup.

On 7 September 2013, in preparation for the 2014 FIFA World Cup Australia travelled to Brasília to play a friendly match against Brazil. Australia suffered a 6–0 loss. On 11 October, Australia travelled to Paris to play another friendly match against France, where the team again suffered a 6–0 loss. Hours after the match against France, FFA announced that the contract of head coach Holger Osieck had been terminated. The decision was made after previous poor performances during the 2014 FIFA World Cup qualification campaign and the recent friendly matches. FFA's desire for Australian success in the forthcoming FIFA World Cup and AFC Asian Cup, as well as a desire to rejuvenate the national team was also a key factor to the sacking of Osieck. FFA Chairman Frank Lowy said "the long-term interests of Australian football were paramount in making the change [in head coach]". Australian assistant coach Aurelio Vidmar was appointed caretaker manager while the FFA searched for a new manager. On 16 October, days after the loss against France, in Vidmar's only game as manager, Australia prevailed 3–0 against Canada, with goals from Joshua Kennedy, Dario Vidošić and Mathew Leckie.

== 2014–2023: Continental success; FIFA World Cup regulars ==
=== 2014 FIFA World Cup ===
On 23 October 2013, after a two-week search for a new manager, Ange Postecoglou was appointed head coach of Australia on a five-year agreement that would see him in the position until August 2018. Names including Tony Popovic, Graham Arnold, Guus Hiddink and Marcelo Bielsa were previously tipped to take the top job. Postecoglou was tasked with regenerating the Australian national team, which was deemed to have been too reliant on members of their Golden Generation of 2006, subsequently leading to a stagnation of results, culminating in successive 6-0 defeats to Brazil and France. In Postecoglou's first game as Australia's manager, a home friendly match against Costa Rica on November 19, Australia won 1–0, courtesy of a goal from Tim Cahill. The goal was Tim Cahill's 29th goal for Australia, tying him with Damian Mori as Australia's leading international goalscorer. The win and performance by Australia were seen as positive signs for the team and the new coach, with many claiming it to be the start of a "new era" for the national team under Ange Postecoglou.

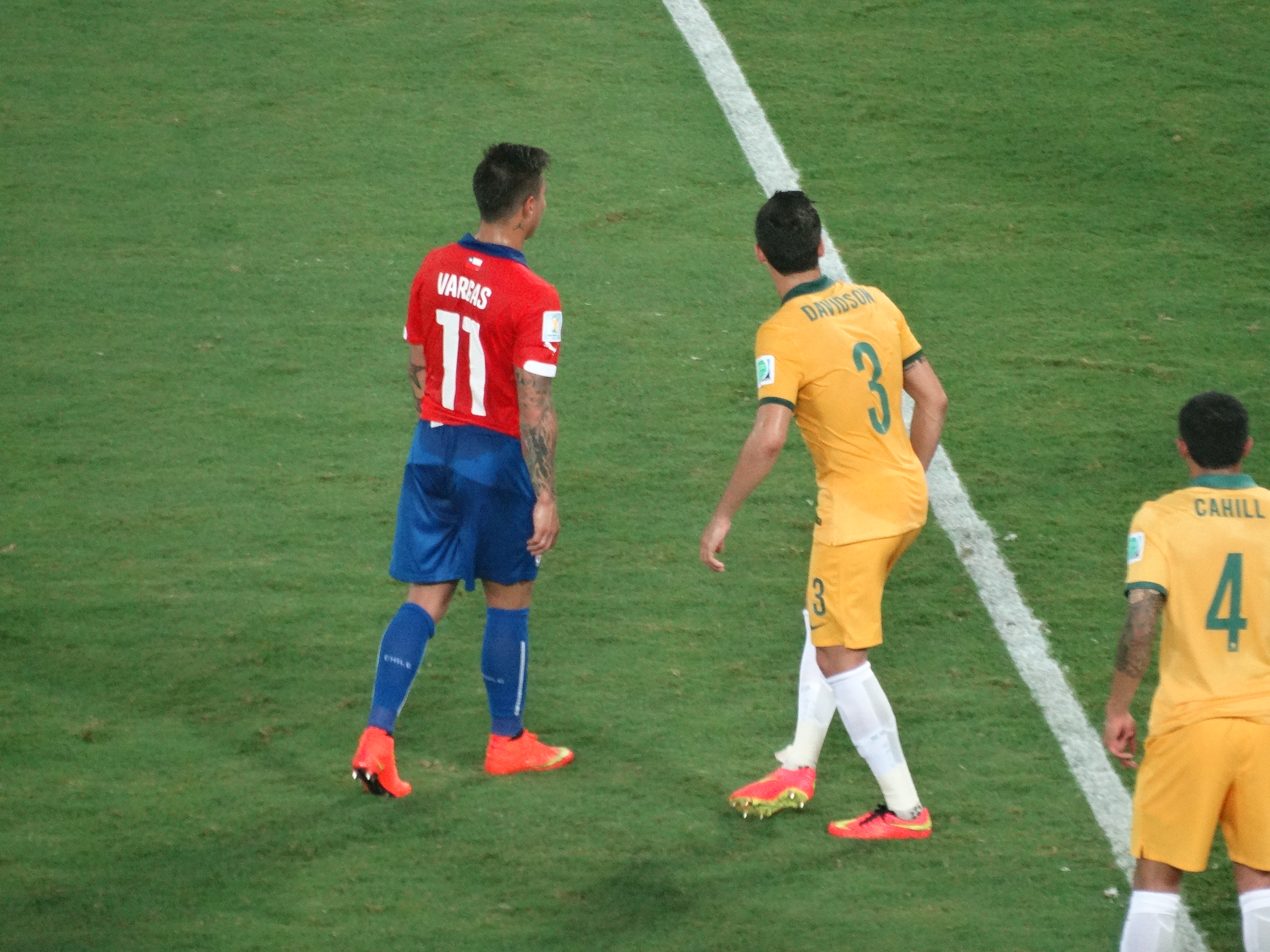
Australia v Chile, 2014 FIFA World Cup

For the 2014 FIFA World Cup, Australia were drawn in Group B alongside reigning Cup holders Spain, 2010 runners-up Netherlands and Chile. Their first match was off to a lacklustre start, having conceded only a goal from Tim Cahill before losing to South America's Chile, 3–1. Their second match against the Netherlands was a close one, but their efforts ended in a 3–2 loss, thus earning their early exit along with the Spanish team. In the end, Australia finished Group B with a third defeat to former world champions Spain, 3–0. Australia's competitive World Cup performances in a difficult group led to belief that a new Golden Generation was about to begin.

In their first international match after the World Cup, Australia played World Cup quarter-finalists Belgium in Liège, with Australia going down 2–0. Four days later, Australia achieved their first international win in 10 months, and just their second win under Ange Postecoglou, with a 2–0 victory over Saudi Arabia in London.

After drawing against the United Arab Emirates, and suffering successive losses against Qatar and Japan, combined with poor results earlier in the year, Australia slipped to 94 and 102 in the FIFA World Rankings, Australia's lowest ever positions. Australia ended the year ranked 100th in the world.

=== 2015 AFC Asian Cup ===
As the host nation of the 2015 AFC Asian Cup, Australia automatically qualified for the tournament. Australia's first game of the tournament was against Kuwait at the Melbourne Rectangular Stadium. Despite falling behind in the 8th minute of the match, Australia won the match 4–1, courtesy of goals from Tim Cahill, Massimo Luongo, Mile Jedinak and James Troisi. Australia defeated Oman 4–0 in their next group match in Sydney before losing the final group game 1–0 to South Korea in Brisbane. Regardless, Australia progressed to the quarter-finals.

Australia remained in Brisbane for their quarter-final fixture against China. A Tim Cahill second half brace saw Australia proceed through to the semi-finals 2–0. Two early goals in Newcastle against UAE were enough for the Socceroos to proceed to their second successive Asian Cup final.

On 31 January 2015 at Stadium Australia in Sydney, Australia played South Korea for the second time in the tournament, this time in the final. Massimo Luongo put Australia ahead late in the first half. South Korea scored in second half injury time sending the game into extra time. James Troisi scored the winner to give Australia their first Men's Asian Cup title. Mathew Ryan was named goalkeeper of the tournament and Luongo was awarded player of the tournament after scoring 2 goals and providing 4 assists.

=== 2017 FIFA Confederations Cup ===
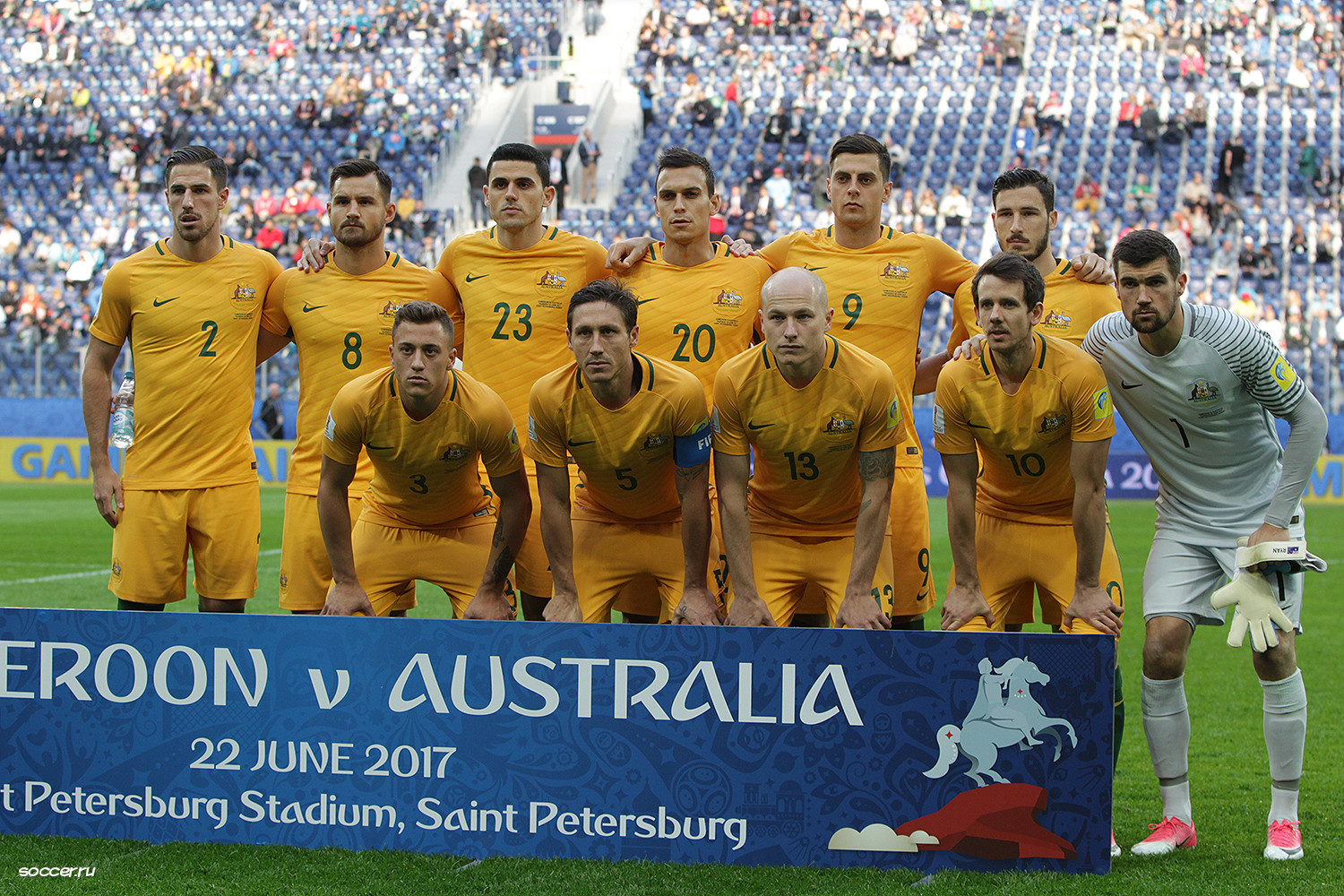
Australian team that played v Cameroon

As a result of winning the 2015 AFC Asian Cup, Australia represented Asia at the 2017 FIFA Confederations Cup. They were drawn to play the reigning World Cup champions, Germany, and the champions of Africa and CONMEBOL, Cameroon and Chile respectively.

The opening game resulted in a 3–2 loss to Germany. Successive one all draws with Cameroon and then Chile resulted in Australia finishing third in the group and hence failing to progress.

=== 2018 FIFA World Cup qualification ===
==== AFC qualifying second round ====
Australia automatically advanced to the second round of AFC 2018 World Cup qualification, where they were drawn in a group with Jordan, Tajikistan, Kyrgyzstan and Bangladesh.

They began the qualifying group with an away match against Kyrgyzstan in Bishkek, where they achieved a 2–1 win. In their first home match of the campaign, they beat Bangladesh 5–0 at Perth Oval, with almost 19,500 fans in attendance. After that, they played against Tajikistan in Dushanbe, winning comfortably 3–0 with Tim Cahill scoring a brace. They blotted their perfect record with a loss 2–0 to Jordan. However, they had managed a good comeback from behind, winning their last 4 matches in the group, including a 5–1 win at home to Jordan.

==== AFC qualifying third round ====
In the third round of qualifying Australia was drawn in a group with Japan, Saudi Arabia, UAE, Iraq and Thailand. They started strongly with a 2–0 victory at home to Iraq in Perth in September 2016. Only days later they managed to defeat the UAE away from home 1-0 putting them top of the group. This was followed by two draws against Saudi Arabia away and Japan at home (2–2 and 1–1 respectively). A further 2–2 draw with Thailand in November 2016 dampened Australia's hopes of direct qualification placing them in 3rd place of the group, one point behind Saudi Arabia and Japan with five games remaining.

The next two games were to be crucial for Australia's hopes of direct qualification facing Iraq away in Iran and the UAE at home in Sydney. In the first game Australia drew with Iraq 1–1 with a header from Mathew Leckie proving the vital goal to earn a point, but this unimpressive away draw to Iraq left Australia flounder as the country got a poor record of four straight draws in a World Cup qualification, which would stand until Ukraine broke the record in the 2022 FIFA World Cup qualification with a 1–1 draw to reigning champions France in Kyiv. This was followed by a strong performance at home to earn the three points against the UAE coming out victorious 2–0. Jackson Irvine and Mathew Leckie's headers proved to be the difference. The game against Saudi Arabia in Adelaide on June 8 resulted in a 3–2 win with a brace from Juric and a long shot from Rogic consolidated their spot in the top three of the group.

When Australia travelled to Japan, a victory would have seen them directly qualify for Russia. However Japan won the game 2–0. This left Australia in third place going into the final game against Thailand in Melbourne. A win for Australia would have forced Saudi Arabia to beat Japan later in the day for the final direct qualification spot. A big win for Australia, e.g. by a margin of at least 4 goals would have meant that the Saudis needed to also increase their winning margin. Despite Australia having over 40 shots at goal, they could only defeat Thailand 2–1 and with Saudi Arabia defeating Japan, Australia were forced down the play-off route where they were to meet Syria.

==== AFC qualifying fourth round ====
Australia travelled to Krubong for the first leg of the play-offs in Hang Jebat Stadium where they held Syria to a 1–1 draw, with a goal courtesy of Robbie Kruse. They returned to Sydney for the second leg, where they won 2–1 in extra-time with both goals by Tim Cahill, where he scored his 50th international goal for Australia. This win gave Australia the opportunity to face Honduras in the AFC-CONCACAF play-off.

==== CONCACAF-AFC intercontinental play-off ====
Australia drew 0–0 in the inter-confederation play-offs against Honduras in San Pedro Sula on 10 November 2017, which meant for the second time, Australia didn't lose their away match in an inter-confederation playoff. In the second leg, on 15 November at Stadium Australia, Australia beat Honduras 3–1 thanks to a hat-trick by captain Mile Jedinak. Honduras' only goal was scored by Alberth Elis during injury time of the second half.

After Australia qualified for the 2018 FIFA World Cup, Ange Postecoglou resigned from his position as coach, and Bert van Marwijk was subsequently appointed as his replacement.

=== 2018 FIFA World Cup ===
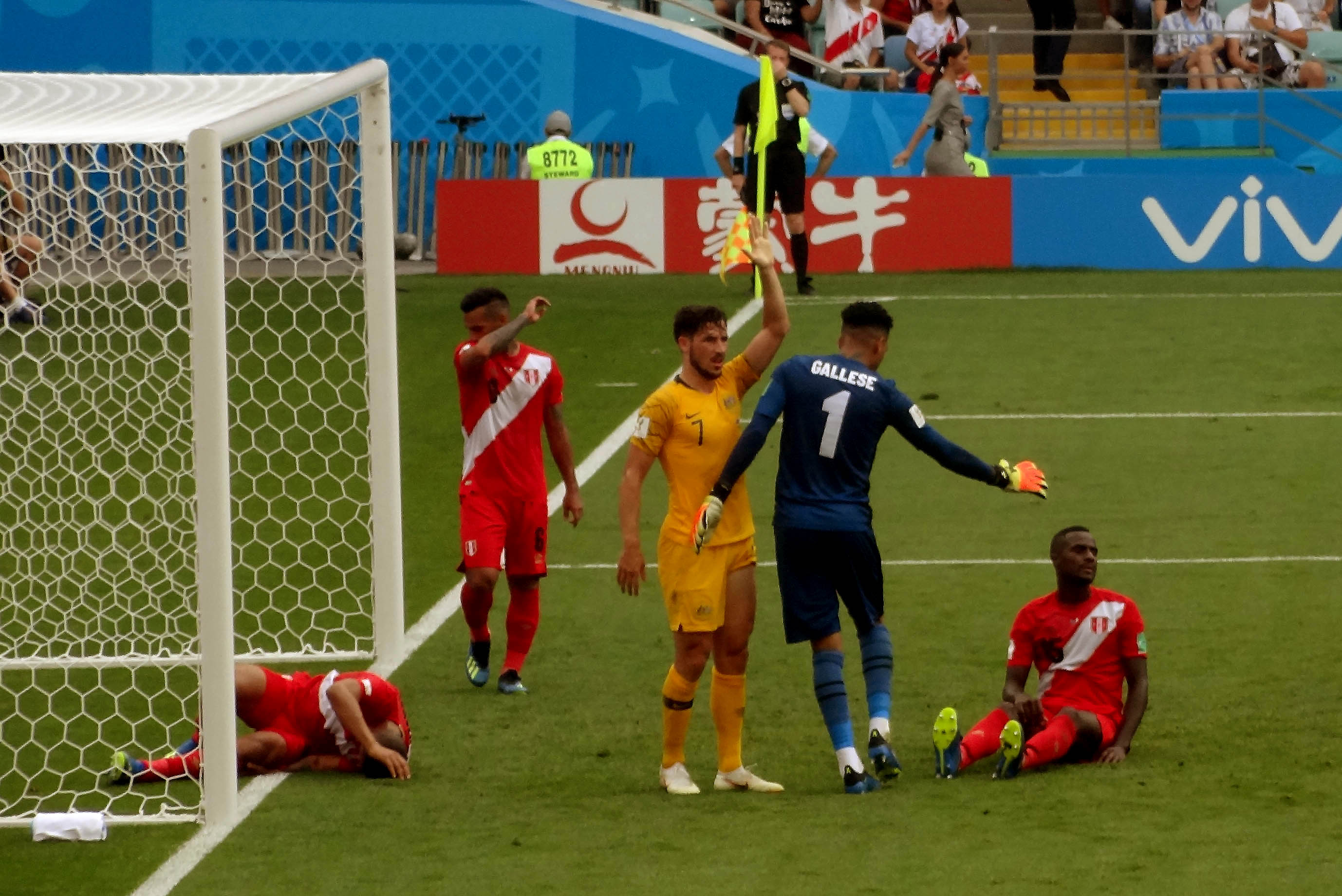
Australia v Peru at the 2018 World Cup

Australia travelled to Russia for the 2018 FIFA World Cup and in their first match, Australia lost 2–1 to France with Mile Jedinak scoring the goal for Australia from a penalty kick given after Samuel Umtiti handled the ball in the box. France scored with a penalty by Antoine Griezmann after Uruguayan referee Andrés Cunha consulted VAR and with an own goal by Aziz Behich which was confirmed by goal line technology. Daniel Arzani was subbed on in the 84th minute and at the age of 19 years and 163 days became the youngest player to ever make a World Cup appearance for Australia. In their second match, Australia drew 1–1 with Denmark with Jedinak scoring the goal for Australia from a penalty kick given after Yussuf Poulsen handled the ball in the box which was confirmed by VAR. Denmark had opened the scoring from a goal by Christian Eriksen. In their third and final match, Australia lost to Peru 2–0, with André Carrillo and Paolo Guerrero scoring from open play.

=== 2019 AFC Asian Cup ===
Bert van Marwijk's short-term appointment as head coach concluded when Australia was eliminated from the 2018 FIFA World Cup. Graham Arnold had already been contracted by the FFA to move into the role after the World Cup. His first tournament in his second stint as coach was the 2019 AFC Asian Cup.

Under Graham Arnold, Australia started their 2019 AFC Asian Cup as the defending champions and were grouped with Jordan, Syria and Palestine. In the opening match at the Hazza bin Zayed Stadium in Al Ain they suffered a 1–0 defeat to Jordan with the only goal scored in the first half by Anas Bani Yaseen.

In the second match they played Palestine, the first ever meeting between the two nations. The match was played at the Rashid Stadium in Dubai and Australia won the game 3–0. Jamie Maclaren headed in from Tom Rogic's cross to score his first international goal and give the holders a 1–0 lead in the 18th minute. Two minutes later, Australia doubled their lead when Awer Mabil found his way in behind the defence to side-foot home an angled pass from Chris Ikonomidis. Australia sealed their win in the 90th minute, with substitute Apostolos Giannou rising high to head home an Ikonomidis cross following an Australian set-piece.

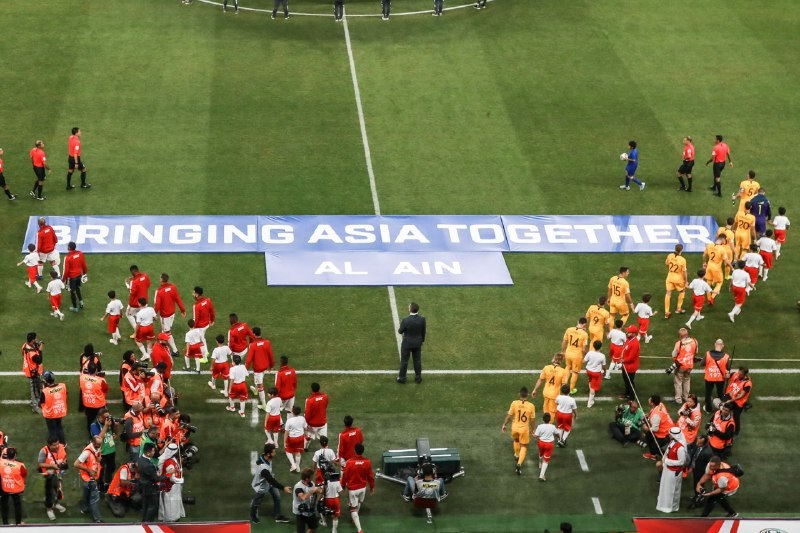
Australia and United Arab Emirates team entering the pitch at the 2019 AFC Asian Cup

The third group game was played at the Khalifa bin Zayed Stadium in Al Ain against Syria. Australia won the game in injury time 3–2 to secure second place in the group. In the 41st minute, Awer Mabil's curling strike arced its way inside the keeper's right post. The lead was to last less than two minutes, however, as Moayad Ajan sent in a cross that Omar Kharbin headed goalward. Mathew Ryan made the initial save, but Kharbin converted the rebound. Nine minutes after the restart, Australia were back in front. Tom Rogic's ball from the left slid past Hussein Jwayed to land at the feet of Ikonomidis, who steered his effort over the line. Five minutes later Syria were level after the referee pointed to the spot and Omar Al Somah converted. Three minutes into added time, Rogic gave Australia the win after he scored with an effort from distance.

With Australia progressing to the Round of 16, they were drawn against Uzbekistan at the Khalifa bin Zayed Stadium in Al Ain. Australia won the match 4–2 on penalties after having drawn 0–0 after extra time. Ignatiy Nesterov saved Aziz Behich's penalty before Islom Tukhtakhodjaev was denied by Mathew Ryan and, with Dostonbek Khamdamov missing the Uzbek's fourth penalty, Leckie scored to take Australia through.

In the Quarter-finals, back at the Hazza bin Zayed Stadium, Australia lost to the host nation United Arab Emirates 1–0. In the 68th minute, Ali Mabkhout put the UAE ahead when the forward stepped in to intercept Milos Degenek's backpass before rounding Ryan to score and eliminating the defending champions from the tournament.

=== 2022 FIFA World Cup qualification ===
==== AFC qualifying second round ====
Australia began its World Cup hunt by recording an impressive 3–0 away win over Kuwait, with Mathew Leckie and Aaron Mooy all scored in the first half. Having eased past Kuwait, Australia went on to destroy Nepal 5–0 at home and Chinese Taipei 7–1 away, with Harry Souttar scored both games. Australia had a difficult trip to Jordan, where they lost both recent World Cup qualifying matches away and fell to the same opponent in the earlier Asian Cup, but Adam Taggart turned hero as Australia bypassed Jordan 1–0 in Amman, ending the country's winless streak in Jordan and helped Australia to have its best performance in the World Cup qualification with perfect 12 points. Subsequently, the COVID-19 pandemic forced the remaining games to be relocated in Kuwait, but despite this, Australia maintained its needed domination, winning all four remaining games to achieve the historic straight eight wins in the qualification and progressed with a perfect 24 points. This result allowed Australia to progress to the third round of qualification, being drawn against Japan, Saudi Arabia, China, Oman and Vietnam.

==== AFC qualifying third round ====
COVID-19 again forced Australia to play its first game outside the country. Australia opened their account in the group with a 3–0 win against China in the Khalifa International Stadium, a neutral venue in Qatar. Several days later, the team travelled to the Mỹ Đình National Stadium in Hanoi, with an unconvincing but welcomed 1–0 victory against Vietnam. Australia's next match was away to Japan, who were struggling in qualification, at the Saitama Stadium. With Australia at the top of the AFC's Group B table, with 6 points from two matches, a win would have seen the Socceroos firmly hold a grip on automatic qualification, as victory would see them 6 points clear from Japan. Conversely, the Samurai Blue were under immense pressure, as a loss would likely place them on the trajectory for the intercontinental playoffs following defeats to Oman and Saudi Arabia, and unconvincing wins against China and Vietnam. The match saw Australia placed under heavy pressure from the Japanese attack, with a defensive error from Trent Sainsbury and Aziz Behich leading to the opening goal from Ao Tanaka. Despite a well-placed free kick from Ajdin Hrustic to equalise the match, Japan sealed a crucial victory in the final minutes of play from a deflection rebounded into the net by Aziz Behich. The result ended Australia's 11 game winning streak, and reduced the team's lead in the qualification standings. Following Football Australia's negotiations with the NSW Government, Australia played their next match against Saudi Arabia at the Western Sydney Stadium. Despite dominating the majority of the first half, Australia wasted key chances that ultimately made them vulnerable to several counter-attacks by the Saudis. In the second half, defender Harry Souttar suffered an anterior cruciate ligament injury. The match ended in a scoreless draw.

With World Cup qualification uncertain, Australia hosted Vietnam in Melbourne. Australia opened the scoring in the first 30 seconds of the match, however, the goal was disallowed following a VAR check that confirmed Jackson Irvine had obstructed goalkeeper Đặng Văn Lâm's view. Australia applied several minutes of pressure to the Vietnamese defence, finally scoring through Jamie Maclaren and Tom Rogic to lead 2–0 at halftime. The match ended 4-0 courtesy of goals from Craig Goodwin and Riley McGree. Following Japan's 2–0 victory at home against Saudi Arabia, Australia remained in third place in the qualification standings. In Australia's next game away to Oman, goals from Jamie Maclaren and Aaron Mooy were not enough to see out a victory, as the Socceroos conceded a late penalty through Fran Karačić which was converted for Abdullah Fawaz's second goal of the match. The game ended in a 2–2 draw. Australia, having built a 3-point gap against Japan, were now 3 points behind the Japanese. Although the result had eliminated Oman from World Cup qualification altogether, assuring Australia of at least a berth in the AFC's fourth round playoffs, a defeat would have seen Australia potentially slip to fourth in the group and fail to qualify for the World Cup. The next match against Japan was held at Stadium Australia Australia opened the match with minimal creativity, having almost conceded a goal from Takumi Minamino's header that hit the crossbar. Minamino hit the post several minutes later from a tight angle. In the second half, Australia's best chance came from a long-distance effort from Ajdin Hrustic that required a parry from Shūichi Gonda. With the match deadlocked at 0–0 with less than 5 minutes to play, Australia began to press higher up the field of play in the hope of securing a late win. The reverse outcome occurred, as Japan capitalised on Australia's poor midfield control to score through Kaoru Mitoma in the final minute of regulation time. The last play of the game saw another effort from Mitoma sneak past Mathew Ryan courtesy of a fumble, finishing off a 2–0 victory for Japan. The result was Japan's first competitive victory against the Socceroos in Australia, and the first time an international team qualified for the World Cup in Australia since Iran's intercontinental playoff victory on away goals against the Socceroos in 1997. Additionally, the match was Australia's first home loss in a meaningful World Cup qualification match in 44 years. Australia's final match of the AFC qualifying round-robin saw the Socceroos travel to Jeddah to play a dead rubber return fixture against Saudi Arabia. Australia once again dominated the first half against the Saudis, with chances missed from Denis Genreau, Awer Mabil and Bruno Fornaroli. Martin Boyle scored close to half-time, however the goal was disallowed in a controversial VAR decision ruling that Boyle was offside. In the second-half, Australia struggled to keep the Saudis at bay, with a clumsy foul from James Jeggo conceding a penalty in the 65 minute. Salem Al-Dawsari converted the penalty, condemning Australia to a 1–0 loss to conclude Group B of World Cup qualifying. Australia finished third in Group B of AFC qualifying with 15 points, only a point above Oman - who would not have been able to eclipse Australia following their 2–2 draw - and seven and eight points adrift of Japan and Saudi Arabia respectively.

==== AFC qualifying fourth round ====
Unlike the previous qualification cycle, Australia then needed to play a team from the CONMEBOL qualification region in order to qualify for the World Cup, although such a fixture would only be assured if the Socceroos could defeat the United Arab Emirates. FIFA ruled that the AFC and intercontinental playoff games would be hosted at a neutral venue and would be one-legged fixtures. The matches were held in Doha, Qatar. In March 2022, CONMEBOL qualification concluded to confirm that Peru would await the victor of Australia and the UAE. In the AFC playoff game, both Australia and the UAE opened the match in a nervous manner, with few chances created in the first half. Australia opened the game's account in the 53 minute through a well-worked attack from Martin Boyle finished by Jackson Irvine. Minutes later, Caio Canedo scored from close range for the UAE, restoring the game's parity. With the match seemingly destined for extra time, a corner kick was volleyed by Australia's Ajdin Hrustic on the edge of the 18 yard box, taking a deflection and ultimately reaching the back of the net in the 84 minute. The goal secured a 2–1 victory for Australia, who progressed to the AFC-CONMEBOL intercontinental play-off.

==== AFC-CONMEBOL intercontinental play-off ====
Australia were to play Peru for the penultimate berth at the 2022 FIFA World Cup. Straight from the kickoff, Australia adopted a high-pressing tactic, with Mitchell Duke generating the first opportunity of the game. With few chances created in the first-half, Australia appeared the better side, having controlled possession through Aaron Mooy which kept Peru's most potent attackers André Carrillo and Christian Cueva relatively quiet. Peru were struggling to overcome Australia's physical prowess, with Duke winning several duels to hold up possession for the Socceroos. In the second half, this pattern of play continued, with Peru struggling to create chances. At the 80th minute, Australia had the first shot on target from a Hrustic free kick, which was parried away by Gallese. As the match drew closer to extra-time, the Socceroos almost scored as Aziz Behich dribbled past two Peruvian defenders, with his right footed effort narrowly wide of the post. With few chances created by either side thereafter, the match ended 0–0 in regulation time. Following no scoring in extra time, Graham Arnold replaced Mathew Ryan with Andrew Redmayne. Penalty specialist Craig Goodwin was also brought with Aziz Behich giving way.

For just the third time in FIFA World Cup qualification history, a team would qualify for the World Cup courtesy of a penalty shootout. Australia won the coin toss and elected to hold the penalty shootout in front of the bays with travelling Australian fans. Australia took the first penalty, with Martin Boyle's effort being saved by Pedro Gallese. As Andrew Redmayne entered the goal, beginning the 'wiggle routine', referee Slavko Vinčić immediately reprimanded Redmayne, informing him that his behaviour could lead to a caution. Redmayne largely ignored Vinčić and continue performing what was now a somewhat restrained wiggling motion in an attempt to intimidate Gianluca Lapadula. Lapadala's well placed spot kick sent Redmayne the wrong way, finding the bottom left corner of the net. Aaron Mooy took Australia's next penalty, and despite Gallese diving the right way to his left, the ball found the net with ease. On Peru's next kick, Redmayne was again scolded by Vinčić and told to remain on the goal-line, to which Redmayne shrugged in agreement to. Alexander Callens converted his penalty, with the shot too high for Redmayne to reach despite his antics. On Australia's third kick, Craig Goodwin appeared calm as the Peruvian crowd began to whistle profusely. As Slavko Vinčić began to instruct Pedro Gallese to stay on the line, Redmayne took the opportunity to grab Gallese's water bottle and throw it over to advertising board into the stands. The water bottle contained information about Australia's penalty kick takers, which allowed Gallese to correctly predict the direction of Australia's first two penalties. After a stunted run-up, Goodwin powerfully shot the ball into the top right corner of the net, bringing the penalty kick score to 2-2. Luis Advíncula took Peru's next penalty, and with Redmayne not being warned by Vinčić in the lead-up to the kick took advantage of his ability to wiggle around the net. Advíncula's shot hit the left goal post, as Redmayne dived the right way. Calls from Pedro Gallese for the penalty to be retaken were waved away by the VAR, after the Peruvians immediately accused Redmayne of diving off his goal line too early. Ajdin Hrustic took Australia's fourth penalty, calmly stroking the ball into the bottom right corner which sent Gallese the wrong way. Peru's fourth penalty was taken by Renato Tapia, whose effort reached the top left corner of the goal despite Redmayne getting a slight touch on the ball. Australia's fifth penalty was taken by Jamie Maclaren, who in a wall of noise from the Peruvian supporters confidently struck the ball into the bottom right corner of the net, once again sending Gallese the wrong way after the goalkeeper's notes and water bottle went missing. Edison Flores took Peru's fifth penalty, which if Redmayne saved would secure victory for Australia. Flores' penalty was hit into the left side of the goal, with Redmayne diving to the right. This sent the penalty shootout into a sudden death round. Awer Mabil was tasked with taking Australia's sixth penalty, and as he stepped back to take his kick, Gallese left the goal to take a drink of water from his sports drink bottle in an attempt to unsettle Mabil. Slavko Vinčić warned Gallese against continuing to stall the penalty, threatening but not sanctioning him with a yellow card. Amid a barrage of whistling from the Peruvians, Mabil converted the penalty to the right corner of the net, once again sending Gallese the opposite direction. Redmayne took advantage of the fact he too was not cautioned by Vinčić, as he left the goal to simulate a series of coughs before a nervous Alex Valera, Peru's sixth penalty taker. Vinčić informed Redmayne that if he saved the penalty, an immediate VAR check would be conducted to confirm that the save was legal and that Redmayne remained on the line. With one final wiggling dance, Valera clearly looked off-put as his penalty shot to the left side of the goal was saved. Andrew Redmayne proceeded to celebrate despite Slavko Vinčić's directives, before the final whistle was blown as the Australian players and coaching staff huddled around Redmayne in wild celebration. The result confirmed Australia's qualification for the 2022 FIFA World Cup.

After being a World Cup participant in 1974, 2006, 2010, 2014 and 2018, Australia's victory against Peru marked the Socceroos' fifth consecutive World Cup appearance.

=== 2022 FIFA World Cup ===
On 1 April, Australia (under the title 'AFC v CONMEBOL winners') was drawn in Group D of the 2022 FIFA World Cup alongside France, Tunisia and Denmark. France and Denmark were also in Australia's group at the 2018 tournament, as were 2022 intercontinental play-off opponents Peru.

France v Australia, 2022 FIFA World Cup

Australia's final 26 player squad for the tournament was named on 8 November. On 22 November, Australia played their first match against France, losing 4–1 at Al Janoub Stadium in Al Wakrah. Craig Goodwin opened the scoring in the ninth minute, scoring Australia's first open play goal at a World Cup since Tim Cahill against the Netherlands in 2014, before France scored four through Adrien Rabiot, Kylian Mbappé and two goals from Olivier Giroud. Four days later, Australia defeated Tunisia 1–0 courtesy of a 23rd-minute header by Mitchell Duke again at Al Janoub Stadium. This was Australia's first win since beating Serbia 2–1 in 2010, and first clean sheet since a scoreless draw against Chile in 1974. Four days afterwards, requiring a win against Denmark again at Al Janoub Stadium to progress to the knockout stage for the second time in history, Australia won 1–0 courtesy of a 60th-minute goal by Mathew Leckie, ending the group in second place with six points, the highest points total Australia had ever gained in the tournament. Despite the 2am start time in Melbourne, the match saw large crowds gather at Federation Square to watch the match and celebrate the progression, making news worldwide. This inspired state governments across the country to set up live sites for the upcoming round of 16 match against eventual champions Argentina. This match came three days later, with Australia losing 2–1 in a close match at the Ahmad bin Ali Stadium, goals coming from Argentina's Lionel Messi and Julián Álvarez, followed by a shot by Craig Goodwin being widely deflected into the goal by Enzo Fernández, being noted as an own goal by Fernandez. 18 year old Australian substitute Garang Kuol became the youngest player to play in a World Cup knockout match since Pelé, also having a close shot at the end of the match which was saved by Argentina goalkeeper Emiliano Martínez to seal the game for Argentina. As domestic-based players returned home to their clubs, they were greeted by crowds at airports in Sydney, Melbourne and Adelaide. Australia would officially record an 11th-placed finish at the FIFA World Cup, their best ever performance at the tournament. With Football Australia pleased with the team's efforts at the tournament, CEO James Johnson announced on 30 January 2023 that Graham Arnold's Socceroos contract would be extended as speculated to the end of the 2026 FIFA World Cup. If Arnold fulfilled the entire length of the contract, he would have surpassed the six year stints achieved by Frank Arok, Frank Farina and Eddie Thomson, which if achieved would have made him the longest serving manager of Australia with eight years at the helm.

=== 2022 FIFA World Cup - Group D ===
Pos	Team	Pld	W	D	L	GF	GA	GD	Pts	Qualification
1	France	3	2	0	1	6	3	+3	6	Advance to knockout stage
2	Australia	3	2	0	1	3	4	−1	6	Advance to knockout stage
3	Tunisia	3	1	1	1	1	1	0	4	
4	Denmark	3	0	1	2	1	3	−2	1	

Source: FIFA
Rules for classification: Group stage tiebreakers

In 2020, Football Federation Australia outlined the XI Principles for the future of Australian football, which would later be referred as Vision 2035, with the aims of restructuring football in Australia. Following the successes of the Socceroos in the 2022 FIFA World Cup, the Vision got a major boost with calls to implement further reforms based from it with new changes and developments being established.

To prepare for the upcoming 2023 AFC Asian Cup, Australia played a series of friendlies against formidable opponents such as Argentina, Ecuador, Mexico and England, before setting themselves in a fine style at the start of the 2026 FIFA World Cup qualifying cycle, beating Bangladesh 7–0 in the opener and won against Palestine in a hard-fought 1–0 win. Australia concluded their preparation with a 2–0 friendly win over Bahrain.

== 2024–present ==
=== 2023 AFC Asian Cup ===
Australia were drawn in Group B with India, Syria and Uzbekistan. The Aussies started their run against India with great difficulties but ultimately triumphed 2–0 in the second half. Australia confirmed their progression with a hard-fought 1–0 win over Syria, where Jackson Irvine scored early in the second half. In the final encounter against Uzbekistan, Australia were held to a 1–1 draw, after Martin Boyle's late penalty at the first half was cancelled by a mid-second half header by Azizbek Turgunboev, nonetheless Australia topped the table to advance past the group stages. Australia then put up its most decent performance in the tournament, demolishing neighbour Indonesia 4–0 at the round of sixteen to set up a titanic clash against fellow heavyweights South Korea in the quarter-finals. Ultimately, Australia would suffer a disheartening second consecutive quarter-finals exit under Arnold's tenure, when the Aussies could not hold on with their one goal lead to lose to the Koreans 2–1 after extra time and thus missed out a chance to win a second Asian title.

=== 2026 FIFA World Cup qualification ===
==== AFC qualifying second round ====
Australia finished undefeated in the second round of 2026 FIFA World Cup qualification, scoring 22 goals and conceding none. On 27 June 2024, the Asian Football Confederation conducted the third round draw, with Australia placed in Group C with Japan, Saudi Arabia, Bahrain, China, and Indonesia.

==== AFC qualifying third round ====
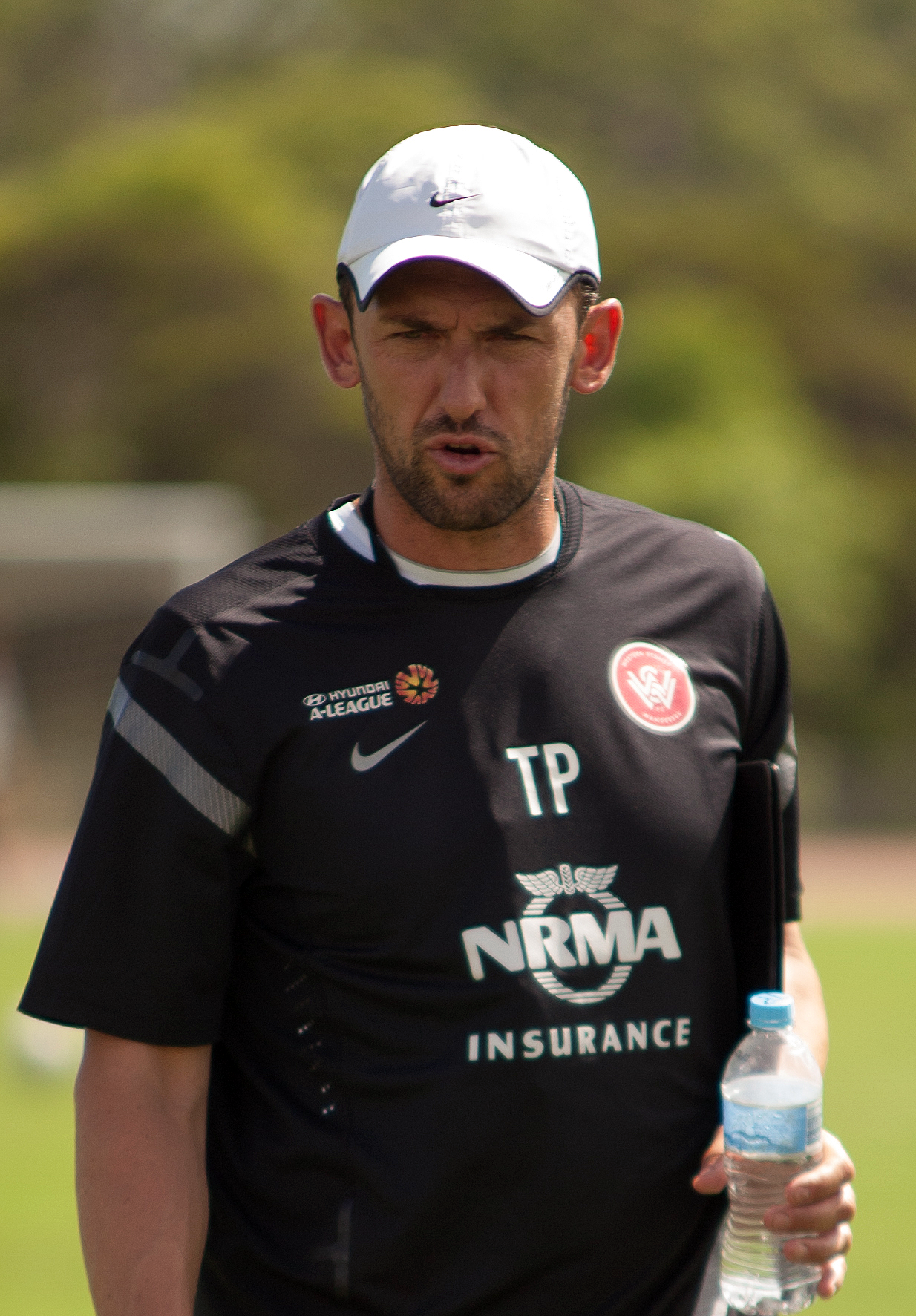
Tony Popovic represented Australia at the 2006 FIFA World Cup and was a member of the Socceroos' golden generation.

The Socceroos opened their third round qualification in miserable fashion, losing 0–1 at home to Bahrain and drawing 0–0 away to Indonesia. Following intense media scrutiny, Graham Arnold decided to resign as head coach, stating 'it's time for fresh leadership to guide the team forward'. On 23 September 2024, Football Australia confirmed that Tony Popovic would assume the role on a two-year contract running to the 2026 FIFA World Cup. Popovic had principally enjoyed success with Western Sydney Wanderers FC, where he won the 2012–13 A-League Premier's Plate and the 2014 AFC Champions League. He has also won the Premier's Plate at Perth Glory FC in addition to the Australia Cup with Melbourne Victory FC. At his first press conference as Australia's head coach, Popovic said "I know what I can do with the group of players [...] and I know we'll play football that everyone will enjoy". Australia recorded their first victory in the group with a gritty 3–1 win at home over China, before drawing 1–1 away to Japan. The Socceroos then played a scoreless draw against Saudi Arabia, and had to rely on a late Kusini Yengi goal to snare a 2–2 draw with Bahrain.

With four games remaining, Tony Popovic acknowledged how open the group was, remarking: "apart from Japan, everyone is taking points off each other, but we find ourselves in second place, a point in front of the group [...] we've got to make sure that March is a very good window for us". Australia consolidated their grip on Group C's second automatic qualification spot courtesy of a 5–1 home victory over Indonesia and 0–2 away win against China. The Socceroos then recorded their first victory over Japan since 2009, and the first in a meaningful match since 2006, with a late Aziz Behich goal sealing a 1–0 victory which took them to the precipice of qualification. Australia finished second in Group C with 19 points following a 1–2 away win against Saudi Arabia. These two victories secured Australia's sixth consecutive FIFA World Cup appearance, and seventh overall. Tony Popovic praised the Socceroos' performances over his tenure, stating "the next part is to be bigger and better at the World Cup". FIFA President Gianni Infantino congratulated the team, stating: "Football’s rise in Australia has been spectacular [...] Following an impressive campaign in Qatar in 2022, I am excited to see them display the same skill and spirit in North America in 2026." Australian Prime Minister Anthony Albanese said the achievement was a "proud moment", while former Socceroo Craig Foster called for Australia to target a quarter-final appearance at the tournament.

=== 2026 FIFA World Cup ===
Australia were drawn into Group D of the tournament with USA, Paraguay and Turkey. The Socceroos surprisingly defeated Turkey 2–0 in Vancouver, which the team heralded as "brilliant". Australia then faltered in a disappointing 0–2 loss against the USA, with critics attributing the result to an overly defensive tactical approach. The Socceroos then held their own in an uneventful yet spirited 0–0 draw against Paraguay, which secured second place in the group and progression to the Round of 32.

Australia were drawn against Egypt, with the victor to play Argentina in the Round of 16. The Socceroos started the match positively with attacking intent, although an early goal from Emam Ashour dampened the momentum. Australia would find an equaliser courtesy of a Mohamad Hany own goal. The match ultimately proceeded to extra time, which was the first time Australia had ever played in such a sequence at the FIFA World Cup. After a scoreless 30 minutes, a penalty shoot-out would decide the match. Tony Popovic substituted goalkeeper Patrick Beach off for Mathew Ryan to play in the shoot-out. That decision was ultimately unsuccessful, with Egypt winning the shoot-out 4–2 and therefore progressing at Australia's expense.

Football Australia ultimately offered Tony Popovic a four year contract extension, which he declined in favour of an interim deal taking him to the end of the 2027 AFC Asian Cup campaign.
