= Wilfred Bratton =

Australian soccer player

Personal information
- Full name: Wilfred Bratton
- Date of birth: 19 December 1896
- Place of birth: Sheffield, England
- Position: Forward

Senior career*
| Years | Team | Apps | (Gls) |
| 1921–1928 | Mapleton | | |

International career
| 1922 | Australia | 1 | (1) |
- * Club domestic league appearances and goals

Wilfred Bratton was an English-born Australian soccer player who also played as a forward for the inaugural Australia national soccer team in 1922.

== Early life ==
Wilfred Bratton was born in Sheffield, England. At the age of 15, Bratton migrated to Australia and settled at Flaxton or Palmwoods where he was employed as a farmhand. He enlisted for World War 1 in May 1915 as a Private and was wounded in service, a victim of gassing and severe trench fever. He returned to Australia in March 1919.

In October 1921 Bratton married Ellen Elizabeth Champion at St Andrew's Church of England, South Brisbane.

In 1928 Bratton wrote to the newspapers about a game of football played between his 3rd Australian Division and the Royal Air Force at Ballieul (Somme on the Western Front) in the winter of 1917.

== Club career ==
Bratton played for Palmwoods in August 1920 in their friendly games against Buderim before the formation of the North Coast Football Association (NCFA) in 1921. In the first season of the NCFA in 1921 Bratton played for Mapleton. Bratton continued to play for Mapleton until 1928 and was even club president.

== International career ==
Bratton played for the Australia national soccer team and was capped only once, as a replacement for Dave Ward with a goal on 24 June 1922 against New Zealand.

Bratton is designated Socceroo cap number 12.

== Career statistics ==
=== International ===
| National team | Year | Competitive | | Friendly | | Total | |
| National team | Year | Apps | Goals | Apps | Goals | Apps | Goals |
|---|---|---|---|---|---|---|---|
| Australia | 1922 | 0 | 0 | 1 | 1 | 1 | 1 |

Scores and results list Australia's goal tally first, score column indicates score after each Australia goal.

List of international goals scored by Wilfred Bratton
| No. | Date | Venue | Opponent | Score | Result | Competition | Ref. |
|---|---|---|---|---|---|---|---|
| 1 | 24 June 1922 | Athletic Park, Wellington, New Zealand | New Zealand | 1–1 | 1–1 | Friendly | |
