= Allen Fisher (soccer) =

Australian soccer player

Personal information
- Full name: Allen Fisher
- Place of birth: Sydney, Australia
- Position: Right back

Senior career*
| Years | Team | Apps | (Gls) |
| 1919–1921 | Balmain Rangers | | |
| 1922 | Pyrmont | | |
| 1923 | Callan Park Asylum | | |
| 1924 | Sydney | | |

International career
| 1922 | Australia | 3 | (0) |
- * Club domestic league appearances and goals

Allen Fisher was a former Australian professional soccer player who played as a right-back for Sydney clubs and the Australia national soccer team. Fisher had the first captaincy for an unofficial international match for Australia against Wanganui in May 1922.

== Club career ==
Fisher played with Balmain Fernleigh from 1919 to 1921, winning two premiership titles, then transferred to Pyrmont to play in the 1922 Sydney Metropolitan league. He joined second-tier club Callan Park Asylum in 1923 and finished his club career late in 1924 with Sydney.

== International career ==
Fisher played Australia's historic tour in 1922 where he played three international matches for Australia in 1922 all against New Zealand. He captained Australia in their 1922 non-A international tour in New Zealand. After the non-A tour in New Zealand, he moved to vice-captain for the official team and gave the captaincy to Alex Gibb.

== Career statistics ==
=== International ===
| National team | Year | Competitive | | Friendly | | Total | |
| National team | Year | Apps | Goals | Apps | Goals | Apps | Goals |
|---|---|---|---|---|---|---|---|
| Australia | 1922 | 0 | 0 | 3 | 0 | 3 | 0 |
