= Bill Brownlee =

New Zealand footballer

Personal information
- Full name: William Brownlee
- Position: Midfielder

Senior career*
Years	Team	Apps	(Gls)
- Wellington Thistle

International career
1922–1923	New Zealand	4	(0)
- * Club domestic league appearances and goals

William Brownlee was an association football player who represented New Zealand, playing in New Zealand's first ever official international.

Brownlee made his full All Whites debut in New Zealand's inaugural A-international fixture, beating Australia 3–1 on 17 June 1922 and ended his international playing career with four A-international caps to his credit, his final cap an appearance in a 3–2 win over Australia on 16 June 1923.
