= George Brown (Australian soccer) =

Australian soccer player

Personal information
- Full name: George Brown
- Place of birth: Queensland, Australia
- Position: Forward

Senior career*
Years	Team	Apps	(Gls)
?–1925	Brisbane City		
1925–?	Pineapple Rovers		

International career
1922	Australia	2	(1)
- * Club domestic league appearances and goals

George Brown was a former Australian professional soccer player who played as a forward for Brisbane City, Pineapple Rovers and the Australia national soccer team.

== Club career ==
Brown played for many years for Brisbane City in the Queensland FA Division One. In 1925, he moved to Pineapple Rovers. He won the Premiership in his first season in 1925 with the Pineapple Rovers.

== International career ==
Brown began his international career with Australia in 1922 on their first historic tour against New Zealand, debuting in a 1–1 draw to New Zealand. He scored his first and only goal for Australia against New Zealand in a 1–3 defeat in July 1922.

== Career statistics ==
=== International ===
National team	Year	Competitive		Friendly		Total	
National team	Year	Apps	Goals	Apps	Goals	Apps	Goals
Australia	1922	0	0	2	1	2	1

Scores and results list Australia's goal tally first, score column indicates score after each Australia goal.

List of international goals scored by George Brown
No.	Date	Venue	Opponent	Score	Result	Competition	Ref.
1	8 July 1922	Carlaw Park, Auckland, New Zealand	New Zealand	1–2	1–3	Friendly	
