= Jock Corbett =

New Zealand footballer

Personal information
- Full name: D O Corbett
- Position: Midfielder

Senior career*
Years	Team	Apps	(Gls)
- Philomel

International career
1922	New Zealand	3	(0)
- * Club domestic league appearances and goals

Jock Corbett was an association football player who represented New Zealand, playing in New Zealand's first ever official international.

Corbett made his full All Whites debut in New Zealand's inaugural A-international fixture, beating Australia 3–1 on 17 June 1922 and ended his international playing career with six A-international caps to his credit, his final cap an appearance in a 4–1 win over Australia on 30 June 1923.
