= Clarence Shenton =

Australian soccer player

Personal information
- Full name: Clarence William Britton Shenton
- Date of birth: 1901
- Place of birth: Nambour, Australia
- Date of death: 13 December 1934 (aged 33)
- Place of death: Southport, Australia
- Position: Half-back

Senior career*
Years	Team	Apps	(Gls)
1921–1924	Wynnum		
1925	Thistle		

International career
1922	Australia	3	(0)
- * Club domestic league appearances and goals

Clarence Shenton (1901 – 1934) was an Australian soccer player who played as a half-back for Brisbane clubs Wynnum and Thistle as well as the Australia national soccer team.

== Early life ==
Clarence William Britton Shenton was born in Nambour, Queensland. He went to Ipswich Grammar School, which proved himself as a professional sportsman. He played in Bundamba, after leaving school where he played a season of rugby and Australian rules football.

== International career ==
Shenton was a member of inaugural Australian soccer team, which toured New Zealand in 1922. He played all three 'A' international matches against the New Zealand national team and has since been designated as 'Socceroo #9'.

== Personal life ==
After his short soccer career, he moved to playing tennis as his sport of choice. He became President of Ipswich Tennis Association around where he died in 1934.

=== Family and relationships ===
Clarence Shenton was married on 14 April 1928 to wife Ivy Walker.

== Death ==
Shenton died on 13 December 1934 at age 33, after suffering from a grave illness for five months.

== Career statistics ==
=== International ===
National team	Year	Competitive		Friendly		Total	
National team	Year	Apps	Goals	Apps	Goals	Apps	Goals
Australia	1922	0	0	3	0	3	0
