= Reg Craxton =

New Zealand footballer

Personal information
- Full name: Reginald W Craxton
- Position: Goalkeeper

Senior career*
Years	Team	Apps	(Gls)
- Northcote

International career
1922–1923	New Zealand	6	(0)
- * Club domestic league appearances and goals

Reg Craxton was an association football goalkeeper who represented New Zealand, playing in New Zealand's first ever official international.

Craxton made his full All Whites debut in New Zealand's inaugural A-international fixture, beating Australia 3–1 on 17 June 1922 and ended his international playing career with six A-international caps to his credit, his final cap an appearance in a 4–1 win over Australia on 30 June 1923.
