= Dave Cumberford =

Australian soccer player

Personal information
- Position: Defender

Senior career*
Years	Team	Apps	(Gls)
1921–1924	Brisbane Thistle		

International career
1922	Australia MNT	3	(0)
- * Club domestic league appearances and goals

Dave Cumberford was an Australian association football player.

== Playing career ==
=== International career ===
Cumberford played three matches for Australia, all in 1922. He played in Australia's first three full international matches, all against New Zealand.

== See also ==
- Jock Cumberford
