= Alex Gibb =

Australian soccer player

Personal information
- Full name: Alex Gibb
- Date of birth: 1888 or 1889
- Place of birth: Leinster, Ireland
- Height: 1.68 m (5 ft 6 in)
- Position: Left half

Youth career
- Musselburgh Union
- Newton Grange
- Musselburgh Athletic

Senior career*
Years	Team	Apps	(Gls)
1911–?	Bundamba Athletic		
–1923	Bundamba Rangers		
1923–?	South Brisbane Scottish		

International career
1922–1923	Australia	6	(0)
- * Club domestic league appearances and goals

Alex Gibb (or Alec) was an Australian soccer player who played half-back with Queensland clubs and the Queensland and Australia national teams. Gibb is recognised as Australia's first international captain, and was awarded Socceroo cap number one retrospectively in 2000 by Football Federation Australia, for Australia's first Test match against New Zealand, played in 1922.

== Early life ==
Gibb was born in Leinster, Ireland, but was raised to Scottish parents in Musselburgh. He played at local clubs Musselburgh Union, Newton Grange and Musselburgh Athletic. He migrated to Ipswich, Queensland in 1911.

== Club career ==
In a career lasting over twenty years, In 1913, he played for the Queensland state side to play against the New South Wales state team in a two-match series. Gibb played for a number of Queensland clubs including Bundamba Athletic, Bundamba Rangers and South Brisbane Scottish. He had left the Bundamba Rangers and was transferred to South Brisbane Scottish as a player-coach on 22 March 1923.

== International career ==
At age 34, Gibb began his international career playing through a 14-match tour with Australia playing in central midfield and right-half positions. He made his international debut for Australia in June 1922 in Australia's first recognised international match, against New Zealand. Gibb played six Test matches for Australia between 1922 and 1923, playing as captain in all of those matches where he had played in Australia's first international win.

== Managerial career ==
After the end of his club career, Gibb managed many Australian state teams and became a selector of Australia in 1936.

== Outside football ==
Gibb was a secretary for the Booval Bowling Club.

== Personal life ==
=== Family and relationships ===
Alex Gibb married Margaret Allan in November 1911 children Margret, Lex, Alan, Alf and Mary born in Ipswich.

Gibb's brother, Aired died at age 53 in October 1939. His mother, Mary Rennie Gibb had then died at age 91 in February 1951 in Yonkers, New York.

== Career statistics ==
=== International ===
National team	Year	Competitive		Friendly		Total	
National team	Year	Apps	Goals	Apps	Goals	Apps	Goals
Australia	1922	0	0	3	0	3	0
Australia	1923	0	0	3	0	3	0
Career total		0	0	6	0	6	0

== Honours ==
In 2000 Gibb was inducted to the Australian Football Hall of Fame.
