= George Cartwright (soccer) =

Australian soccer player

Personal information
- Full name: George Nick Cartwright
- Position: Goalkeeper

Youth career
- Leichhardt Rovers

Senior career*
Years	Team	Apps	(Gls)
1920–1924	Balmain Fernleigh		
1924–?	Balmain Gladstone		

International career
1922–1924	Australia	10	(0)
- * Club domestic league appearances and goals

George Cartwright was an Australian professional soccer player. He played as a goalkeeper for the Australia national soccer team.

== Club career ==
=== Leichhardt Rovers ===
Cartwright grew up in Balmain to play with the Leichhardt Rovers. He also won the State U18 Nurse Cup.

=== Balmain Gladstone ===
He had suffered a season injury early into the 1925 Sydney Metropolitan season by a hand cut from a boot by Batten. He was then sent to St. Vincent's Hospital where he had three stitches inserted.

== Representative career ==
Cartwright began his international career with Australia in 1922 as the country's first capped goalkeeper in a 3–1 loss to New Zealand on 17 June 1922.

He was chosen to take part for one of the Newcastle representative teams on 12 May 1924. Around three weeks later, he was chosen for Australia's goalkeeper in their historic tour against Canada in 1924. At the end of the tour, Cartwright was awarded a souvenir medal for being adjudged the best Australian goalkeeper in the test matches against Canada.

== Career statistics ==
=== International ===
National team	Year	Competitive		Friendly		Total	
National team	Year	Apps	Goals	Apps	Goals	Apps	Goals
Australia	1922	0	0	3	0	3	0
Australia	1923	0	0	3	0	3	0
Australia	1924	0	0	4	0	4	0
Career total		0	0	10	0	10	0
