= Jock Cumberford =

Australian soccer player

Personal information
- Full name: Jock Terence Cumberford
- Position: Forward

International career
Years	Team	Apps	(Gls)
	Australia	3	(0)

Jock Terence Cumberford was an Australian association football player.

== Playing career ==
=== International career ===
Cumberford played three matches for Australia, all in 1922. He played in Australia's first three full international matches, all against New Zealand.

== Coaching career ==
During the mid-1940s Cumberford coached in the Queensland State League.

== See also ==
- Dave Cumberford
