= Peter Doyle (soccer) =

Australian soccer player

Personal information
- Full name: Peter Doyle
- Place of birth: Australia
- Position: Half-back

Senior career*
Years	Team	Apps	(Gls)
1918–?	Adamstown		

International career
1922–1923	Australia	4	(0)
- * Club domestic league appearances and goals

Peter Doyle was a former Australian professional soccer player who played as a half-back for Newcastle clubs and the Australia national soccer team.

== Club career ==
Doyle played with Adamstown, winning the 1920 Northern NSW Premiership, and won a Gardiner Cup in 1925 as captain. He became the first Adamstown player to represent Australia and first to captain the NSW representative team. He played against Canada and the England XI team as captain.

== International career ==
Doyle appeared in all three Australia international matches in 1922, including one extra match against New Zealand in 1923.

== Career statistics ==
=== International ===
National team	Year	Competitive		Friendly		Total	
National team	Year	Apps	Goals	Apps	Goals	Apps	Goals
Australia	1922	0	0	3	0	3	0
Australia	1923	0	0	1	0	1	0
Career total		0	0	4	0	4	0
