= Australia men's national soccer team results (1980–1999) =

The following details the Australia men's national soccer team results in competitive and also non-competitive (friendly) matches. Games are listed in chronological order, grouped by decade and year, from 1980 to 1999. The matches at the 1980 OFC Nations Cup are not counted as full internationals apart from the match against Papua New Guinea as they were the only team recognised as a FIFA member.

== 1980s ==
=== 1980 ===
27 January 1980	Australia	0–4	Czechoslovakia	Canberra, Australia
			Jurkemik 24'; Vízek 34'; Nehoda 62'; Kozák 67'	Stadium: Canberra Stadium; Attendance: 15,283; Referee: C Bambridge (Australia)

3 February 1980	Australia	0–5	Czechoslovakia	Sydney, Australia
			Masný 46'; Gajdůšek 55'; Masný 63'; Kroupa 81'; Kozák 88'	Stadium: Sydney Sports Ground; Attendance: 14,368; Referee: Tony Boskovic (Australia)

9 February 1980	Australia	2–2	Czechoslovakia	Melbourne, Australia
	Prskalo 9' (pen.); Krncevic 55'		Dobiaš 11' (pen.); Nehoda 23'	Stadium: Olympic Park Stadium; Attendance: 15,000; Referee: Barry Harwood (Australia)

26 February 1980 1980 OFC Nations Cup	Australia	11–2	Papua New Guinea	Nouméa, New Caledonia
	Moulis (?); Bertogna (?); V. Bozanic (?); I. Hunter (?); Krncevic (?); Sharne (?)		Mouagi (?); Torea (?)	Stadium: Nouméa Stadium

31 May 1980	Australia	1–2	England	Sydney, Australia
	G. Cole 88' (pen.)		Hoddle 10'; Mariner 25'	Stadium: Sydney Cricket Ground; Attendance: 45,000; Referee: Tony Boskovic (Australia)

12 June 1980	Australia	1–2	Northern Ireland	Sydney, Australia
	Sharne 85'		Nicholl 11'; O'Neill 53'	Stadium: Sydney Cricket Ground; Attendance: 12,000; Referee: P Rampley (Australia)

15 June 1980	Australia	1–1	Northern Ireland	Melbourne, Australia
	Sharne 18'		O'Neill 82'	Stadium: Olympic Park Stadium; Attendance: 10,000; Referee: S Mellings (Australia)

18 June 1980	Australia	1–2	Northern Ireland	Adelaide, Australia
	Sharne (?)		Brotherston 67'; McCurdey 77'

24 August 1980	Australia	2–2	Mexico	Sydney, Australia
	Boden 57' (pen.); Yzendoorn 73'		Castro 39'; González 84'	Stadium: Sydney Sports Ground; Attendance: 7,500; Referee: C Bambridge (Australia)

26 August 1980	Australia	1–1	Mexico	Melbourne, Australia
	G. Cole 58'		Castro 67'	Stadium: Olympic Park Stadium; Referee: C Bambridge (Australia)

11 November 1980	Australia	3–3	Greece	Athens, Greece
	G. Cole 24'; Barnes 84'; Selemidis 88'		Damanakis 25'; Domazos 67'; Dalikaris 89' (pen.)	Stadium: Leoforos Alexandras Stadium; Attendance: 11,300; Referee: Vasilis Vourakis (Greece)

2 December 1980	Australia	1–0	Israel	Be'er Sheva, Israel
	G. Cole 28' (pen.)			Stadium: Vasermil Stadium; Attendance: 5,000; Referee: Zvi Sharir (Israel)

5 December 1980	Australia	0–1	Hong Kong	Hong Kong
			Lau Wing Yip 85'	Stadium: Hong Kong Stadium; Attendance: 9,548

7 December 1980	Australia	1–1	Indonesia	Jakarta, Indonesia
	Henderson 13'		Effendi 5'	Stadium: Senayan Stadium; Attendance: 60,000; Referee: Kossain Katradiredja (Indonesia)

=== 1981 ===
25 April 1981 World Cup qualifier	Australia	3–3	New Zealand	Auckland, New Zealand
	Krncevic 15', 42'; Boden 31'		Grant Turner 25'; Steve Wooddin 34'; Steve Sumner 80'	Stadium: Mount Smart Stadium; Attendance: 10,000; Referee: Gianfranco Menegali (Italy)

16 May 1981 World Cup qualifier	Australia	0–2	New Zealand	Sydney, Australia
			Steve Wooddin 29'; Grant Turner 81'	Stadium: Sydney Cricket Ground; Attendance: 12,000; Referee: George Courtney (England)

20 May 1981 World Cup qualifier	Australia	2–0	Indonesia	Melbourne, Australia
	Kosmina 29'; Davidson 33'			Stadium: Olympic Park Stadium; Attendance: 10,000; Referee: V Garcia Olivera (Portugal)

10 June 1981 World Cup qualifier	Australia	3–2	Chinese Taipei	Adelaide, Australia
	Henderson (18"); Kosmina 56'; Byrne 68' (pen.)		Deng-Sheng Duh (?)	Stadium: Hindmarsh Stadium; Attendance: 3,200; Referee: Vijit Getkaen (Thailand)

26 July 1981 World Cup qualifier	Australia	4–1	Fiji	Suva, Fiji
	Cole 4', 31'; Barnes 10'; Sharne 28'		Vuilanassa 83'	Stadium: National Stadium; Attendance: 11,000

14 August 1981 World Cup qualifier	Australia	10–0	Fiji	Melbourne, Australia
	Mitchell 28', 43', 80'; Cole 37', 43', 54', 63', 70', 71', 76'			Stadium: Olympic Park Stadium; Attendance: 3,500; Referee: A.Nobnom (Thailand)

30 August 1981 World Cup qualifier	Australia	0–1	Indonesia	Surabaya, Indonesia
			Risdianto 88'	Attendance: 25,000; Referee: R Reyes (Philippines)

6 September 1981 World Cup qualifier	Australia	0–0	Chinese Taipei	Taipei, Taiwan
				Attendance: 7,000; Referee: T Gurkan (Philippines)

=== 1982 ===
6 October 1982 Merlion Cup	Australia	4–0	Thailand	Singapore
	O'Connor (?); Kosmina 46', 79'; Cole 71'			Stadium: Singapore National Stadium; Attendance: 3,000; Referee: N Chandra (Singapore)

11 October 1982 Merlion Cup	Australia	2–0	Indonesia	Singapore
	Mitchell 73', 77'			Stadium: Singapore National Stadium; Attendance: 5,000; Referee: Lee Kok Leong (Singapore)

14 October 1982 Merlion Cup	Australia	5–0	Malaysia	Singapore.
	Katholos 19', 37'; Kosmina 56'; O'Connor 64'; Cole 77'			Stadium: Singapore National Stadium; Attendance: 12,000; Referee: Lee Kok Leong (Singapore)

17 October 1982 Merlion Cup	Australia	3–2	South Korea	Singapore
	O'Connor 17'; Mitchell 34'; Christopoulos 61'		Oh Suk Jae 59'; Park Chang Seun 83'	Stadium: Singapore National Stadium; Attendance: 25,000; Referee: N Chandra (Singapore)

=== 1983 ===
27 February 1983 Trans-Tasman Cup	Australia	0–2	New Zealand	Melbourne, Australia
			Cole 66'; Adam 73'	Stadium: Olympic Park Stadium; Attendance: 14,000; Referee: Jack Johnston (Australia)

22 February 1983 Trans-Tasman Cup	Australia	1–2	New Zealand	Auckland, New Zealand
	Kosmina 36'		Cresswell 47'; Ratcliffe 69' (o.g.)	Stadium: Mount Smart Stadium; Attendance: 3,000; Referee: William Munro (New Zealand)

12 June 1983	Australia	0–0	England	Sydney, Australia
				Stadium: Sydney Cricket Ground; Attendance: 28,000; Referee: Tony Boskovic (Australia)

15 June 1983	Australia	0–1	England	Brisbane, Australia
			Walsh 36'	Stadium: Lang Park; Attendance: 16,000; Referee: Peter Rampley (Australia)

19 June 1983	Australia	1–1	England	Melbourne, Australia
	Neal 27' (o.g.)		Francis 25'	Stadium: Olympic Park Stadium; Attendance: 20,000; Referee: Jack Johnston (Australia)

4 December 1983 Merlion Cup	Australia	1–2	China	Singapore
	Kosmina (?)		(?) (?)	Stadium: Singapore National Stadium

10 December 1983 Merlion Cup	Australia	2–0	Thailand	Singapore
	Murphy (?); Kosmina (?)			Stadium: Singapore National Stadium

15 December 1983 Merlion Cup	Australia	3–1	South Korea	Singapore
	Kosmina 17'; O'Connor 58'; Cant 74'		Lee Hyun-Chul 37'	Stadium: Singapore National Stadium

18 December 1983 Merlion Cup	Australia	4–2	Singapore	Singapore
	Watson (?); Kosmina (?); Campbell (?); O'Connor (?)		(?) (?)	Stadium: Singapore National Stadium

=== 1984 ===
3 November 1984	Australia	2–3	China	Beijing, China
	Kosmina (?)		(?) (?) (?)

=== 1985 ===
21 September 1985 World Cup qualifier	New Zealand	0–0	Australia	Auckland, New Zealand
		Report		Stadium: Mount Smart Stadium; Attendance: 14,826; Referee: Keith Hackett (England)

27 September 1985 Friendly	Australia	3–0	China	Brisbane, Australia
	Kosmina 9'; Crino 14'; Watson 63'	Report		Stadium: Lang Park; Attendance: 4,823; Referee: Bill Monteverde (Australia)

5 October 1985 World Cup qualifier	Israel	1–2	Australia	Ramat Gan, Israel
	Armeli 65'	Report	Mitchell 46'; Kosmina 49'	Stadium: Ramat Gan Stadium; Attendance: 50,000; Referee: Luigi Agnolin (Italy)

20 October 1985 World Cup qualifier	Australia	1–1	Israel	Melbourne, Australia
	Ratcliffe 46'	Report	Cohen 46'	Stadium: Olympic Park Stadium; Attendance: 27,000; Referee: José Rosa dos Santos (Portugal)

23 October 1985 World Cup qualifier	Australia	7–0	Chinese Taipei	Adelaide, Australia
	Dunn 2', 89' (pen.); Chiang 13' (o.g.); Mitchell 57', 59', 87'	Report		Stadium: Hindmarsh Stadium; Attendance: 2,000; Referee: John Cameron (New Zealand)

27 October 1985 World Cup qualifier	Australia	8–0	Chinese Taipei	Sydney, Australia
	Odžakov 41', 56', 69'; Crino 52'; Kosmina 65' (pen.), 72', 88'; Gray 89'	Report		Stadium: St George Stadium; Attendance: 2,694; Referee: Bill Munro (New Zealand)

3 November 1985 World Cup qualifier	Australia	2–0	New Zealand	Sydney, Australia
	Kosmina 12'; Mitchell 48'	Report		Stadium: Sydney Sports Ground; Attendance: 21,910; Referee: Gerard Guerds (Netherlands)

20 November 1985 World Cup qualifier	Scotland	2–0	Australia	Glasgow, United Kingdom (Scotland)
	Cooper 53'; McAvennie 59'	Report		Stadium: Hampden Park; Attendance: 60,000; Referee: Vojtech Christov (Czechoslovakia)

4 December 1985 World Cup qualifier	Australia	0–0 (0–2 on aggregate)	Scotland	Melbourne, Australia
		Report		Stadium: Olympic Park Stadium; Attendance: 29,500; Referee: José Roberto Wright (Brazil)

=== 1986 ===
3 August 1986	Australia	1–1	Czechoslovakia	Melbourne, Australia
	Arnold 90'		Novak 24'	Stadium: Olympic Park Stadium; Attendance: 6,000; Referee: Chris Bambridge (Australia)

6 August 1986	Australia	0–1	Czechoslovakia	Adelaide, Australia
			Griga 50'	Stadium: Hindmarsh Stadium; Attendance: 2,000; Referee: Don Campbell (Australia)

10 August 1986	Australia	0–3	Czechoslovakia	Sydney, Australia
			Kula 23'; Kubík 53' (pen.), 85'	Stadium: Parramatta Stadium; Attendance: 10,150; Referee: Richard Lorenc (Australia)

25 October 1986 Trans-Tasman Cup	Australia	1–1	New Zealand	Auckland, New Zealand
	Arnold 55'		Deeley 60'; Turner (yellow card) ?' (red card) 75'	Stadium: Mount Smart Stadium; Attendance: 3,156; Referee: Garry Fleet (New Zealand)

2 November 1986 Trans-Tasman Cup	Australia	2–1	New Zealand	Sydney, Australia
	Arnold 29'; Zinni 74'		Deeley 85'	Stadium: Parramatta Stadium; Attendance: 4,800; Referee: Gary Power (Australia)

23 November 1986	Australia	2–0	China	Canton, China
	Kalantzis (?); Arnold (?)			Stadium: Canton Stadium

=== 1987 ===
9 June 1987 1987 President's Cup Football Tournament	Australia	1–0	Morocco	Gangneung, South Korea
	Farina 7'			Stadium: Gangneung Stadium

19 June 1987 1987 President's Cup Football Tournament	Australia	0–0 (a.e.t.)	Egypt	Seoul, South Korea
				Stadium: Olympic Stadium

21 June 1987 1987 President's Cup Football Tournament	Australia	1–1 (a.e.t.)	South Korea	Seoul, South Korea
	Arnold 83'		Kim Pan-Keun 72'	Stadium: Olympic Stadium

2 September 1987 Trans-Tasman Cup	Australia	1–1	New Zealand	Melbourne, Australia
	Zinni 68'		Ironside 82'	Stadium: Olympic Park Stadium; Attendance: 5,000; Referee: Chris Bambridge (Australia)

9 September 1987 Trans-Tasman Cup	Australia	0–1	New Zealand	Lower Hutt, New Zealand
			de Jong 18'	Stadium: Hutt Recreation Ground; Attendance: 5,000; Referee: Garry Fleet (New Zealand)

15 November 1987 Olympic qualifier	Australia	3–0	Chinese Taipei	Taipei, Taiwan
	Arnold (?); Farina (?)

=== 1988 ===
26 February 1988 Olympic qualifier	Australia	3–0	Chinese Taipei	Canberra, Australia
	Arnold (?); Farina (?)	Report		Stadium: Bruce Stadium

6 March 1988 Olympic qualifier	Australia	2–0	Israel	Melbourne, Australia
	Yankos 70' (pen.); Farina 91'	Report		Stadium: Olympic Park Stadium; Attendance: 9,518; Referee: Hernan Silva Arci (Chile)

9 March 1988 Olympic qualifier	Australia	3–2	Chinese Taipei	Adelaide, Australia
	Tobin (?); Crino (?); Patikas (?)	Report	(?) (?)	Stadium: Hindmarsh Stadium

13 March 1988 Olympic qualifier	Australia	3–1	New Zealand	Sydney, Australia
	Patikas (?); Farina (?); Crino (?)	Report	McGarry (?)	Stadium: Sydney Football Stadium; Referee: Hernan Silva (Chile)

20 March 1988 Olympic qualifier	Australia	0–0	Israel	Christchurch, New Zealand
		Report		Stadium: Queen Elizabeth II Stadium; Referee: Georges Sandoz (Switzerland)

23 March 1988 Olympic qualifier	Australia	1–1	New Zealand	Wellington, New Zealand
	Farina (?)	Report	McGarry (?)	Stadium: Athletic Park; Referee: Georges Sandoz (Switzerland)

27 March 1988 Olympic qualifier	Australia	3–0	Chinese Taipei	Auckland, New Zealand
	Arnold (?); Farina (?); Wade (?)	Report		Stadium: Eden Park

7 July 1988	Australia	0–1	Brazil	Melbourne, Australia
		Report	Romário 31'	Stadium: Olympic Park Stadium; Attendance: 11,214; Referee: Richard Lorenc (Australia)

9 July 1988	Australia	3–0	Saudi Arabia	Sydney, Australia
	Ollerenshaw 6'; Farina 40', 82'	Report		Stadium: Parramatta Stadium; Attendance: 11,214; Referee: Bill Monteverde (Australia)

14 July 1988	Australia	4–1	Argentina	Sydney, Australia
	Wade 4'; Yankos 43', 68' (pen.); Bozinoski 80'	Report	Ruggeri 31'	Stadium: Sydney Football Stadium; Attendance: 18,985; Referee: Gary Power (Australia)

17 July 1988	Australia	0–2	Brazil	Sydney, Australia
		Report	Romário 56'; Müller 67'	Stadium: Sydney Football Stadium; Attendance: 28,161; Referee: Donald Campbell (Australia)

20 September 1988 Olympic Games	Australia	0–3	Brazil	Seoul, Korea
		Report	Romário 20', 57', 61'	Stadium: Dongdaemun Stadium; Attendance: 15,000; Referee: Tritschler (West Germany)

22 September 1988 Olympic Games	Australia	1–0	Nigeria	Seoul, Korea
	Kosmina 76'	Report		Stadium: Dongdaemun Stadium; Attendance: 12,800; Referee: Listkiewicz (Poland)

12 October 1988 Trans-Tasman Cup	Australia	2–1	New Zealand	Dunedin, New Zealand
	Crino 60'; Ollerenshaw 74'	Report	Ironside 77'	Stadium: Caledonian Ground; Attendance: 3,000; Referee: Lennox Sharp (New Zealand)

16 October 1988 Trans-Tasman Cup	Australia	2–0	New Zealand	Bendigo, Australia
	Lund 49' (o.g.); Spink 68'	Report		Stadium: Queen Elizabeth Oval; Attendance: 5,000; Referee: Chris Bambridge (Australia)

20 November 1988 World Cup qualifier	Australia	0–1	Fiji	Nadi, Fiji
		Report	Madigi 66'	Stadium: Prince Charles Park; Attendance: 6,000; Referee: Gary Fleet (New Zealand)

3 December 1988 World Cup qualifier	Australia	5–1	Fiji	Newcastle, Australia
	Yankos 9', 69' (pen.); Spink 25'; Arnold 84'; Trimboli 87'	Report	Dalai 89'	Stadium: Macquarie Field; Attendance: 5,220; Referee: Kenneth Wallace (New Zealand)

=== 1989 ===
12 March 1989 World Cup qualifier	Australia	4–1	New Zealand	Sydney, Australia
	Crino 16'; Arnold 42', 56'; Yankos 78' (pen.)		Dunford 70'	Stadium: Sydney Football Stadium; Attendance: 13,621; Referee: Shizuo Takada (Japan)

19 March 1989 World Cup qualifier	Australia	1–1	Israel	Ramat Gan, Israel
	Yankos 72'		Ohana 76' (pen.)	Stadium: Ramat Gan Stadium; Attendance: 45,000; Referee: Manfred Neumer (West Germany)

2 April 1989 World Cup qualifier	Australia	0–2	New Zealand	Auckland, New Zealand
			Dunford 19'; Wright 80'	Stadium: Mount Smart Stadium; Attendance: 3,340; Referee: Bin Singah (Singapore)

16 April 1989 World Cup qualifier	Australia	1–1	Israel	Sydney, Australia
	Trimboli 88'		Ohana 40'	Stadium: Sydney Football Stadium; Attendance: 40,320; Referee: Carlo Longhi (Italy)

== 1990s ==
=== 1990 ===
25 August 1990 Indonesian Independence Cup Final	Indonesia	0–3	Australia	Jakarta, Indonesia
		Report	55', 76' Wade; 63' Zinni	Stadium: Senayan Stadium; Attendance: 18,000; Referee: (Japan) N Yasunori

6 September 1990	South Korea	1–0	Australia	Seoul, South Korea
	Byung-Joo 17'	Report=		Stadium: Tongdaemun Stadium; Attendance: 18,000; Referee: (South Korea) Kil Ki-Chul

9 September 1990	South Korea	1–0	Australia	Busan, South Korea
	Jung-Won 70'	Report		Stadium: Kudok Stadium; Attendance: 20,000; Referee: (South Korea) Choi Kil-Soo

=== 1991 ===
30 January 1991	Australia	0–1	Czechoslovakia	Melbourne, Australia
		Report	44' Kristofik	Stadium: Olympic Park Stadium; Attendance: 6,854; Referee: (Australia) Christopher Bambridge

6 February 1991	Australia	0–2	Czechoslovakia	Sydney, Australia
		Report	59' Kula; 87' Grussmann	Stadium: Parramatta Stadium; Attendance: 8,221; Referee: (Australia) John McConnell

12 May 1991 Trans-Tasman Cup	New Zealand	0–1	Australia	Christchurch, New Zealand
		Report	44' Milosevic	Stadium: QEII Stadium; Attendance: 8,000; Referee: (New Zealand) Gary Fleet

15 May 1991 Trans-Tasman Cup	Australia	2–1	New Zealand	Adelaide, Australia
	Petersen 46'; A. Vidmar 50'	Report	75' Roberts	Stadium: Hindmarsh Stadium; Attendance: 6,500; Referee: (Australia) B Monteverde

1 June 1991	Australia	0–1	England	Sydney, Australia
		Report	75' (o.g.) Gray	Stadium: Sydney Football Stadium; Attendance: 35,742; Referee: (New Zealand) Barry Tasker

14 June 1991	South Korea	0–0	Australia	Seoul, South Korea
		Report		Stadium: Tongdaemun Stadium; Attendance: 16,000; Referee: (Thailand) Witaya Wongsmarn

=== 1992 ===
26 January 1992	Australia	0–0	Sweden	Sydney, Australia
		Report		Stadium: Sydney Football Stadium; Attendance: 13,456; Referee: (Australia) Gary Power

29 January 1992	Australia	1–0	Sweden	Adelaide, Australia
	Edwards 77'	Report		Stadium: Hindmarsh Stadium; Attendance: 9,301; Referee: (Australia) Tom McRoe

2 February 1992	Australia	1–0	Sweden	Melbourne, Australia
	Wade 66'	Report		Stadium: Olympic Park Stadium; Attendance: 10,800; Referee: (Australia) John Fraser

8 July 1992	Australia	3–1	Croatia	Adelaide, Australia
	Tapai 10'; Spink 14' van Blerk 80'	Report	Weber 31'; Stimac (red card)	Stadium: Hindmarsh Stadium; Attendance: 2,500; Referee: (Australia) Tom McRoe

13 June 1992	United States	0–1	Australia	Orlando, USA
		Report	85' Spink	Stadium: Citrus Bowl; Attendance: 17,400; Referee: (United States) Ed Cummings

18 June 1992	Argentina	2–0	Australia	Buenos Aires, Argentina
	Batistuta 47' (pen.), 57'	Report		Stadium: Estadio Monumental; Attendance: 35,000; Referee: (Uruguay) Eduardo Dluzniewski

21 June 1992	Uruguay	2–0	Australia	Montevideo, Uruguay
	Martínez 74'; Larrea 84'	Report		Stadium: Centenario Stadium; Attendance: 35,000; Referee: (Argentina) Juan Carlos Loustau

5 July 1992	Australia	1–0	Croatia	Melbourne, Australia
	Marth 62'	Report	Jelicic (red card)	Stadium: Olympic Park Stadium; Attendance: 11,000; Referee: (Australia) John Fraser

12 July 1992	Australia	0–0	Croatia	Sydney, Australia
		Report	Vucevic (red card)	Stadium: Sydney Football Stadium; Attendance: 12,735; Referee: (Australia) Gary Power

14 August 1992	Indonesia	0–3	Australia	Jakarta, Indonesia
		Report	63' Edwards; 71' Gray; 84' Wade	Stadium: Gelora Bung Karno Stadium; Attendance: 2,500

11 August 1992	Australia	0–1	Malaysia	Jakarta, Indonesia
		Report	70' Ravindran	Stadium: Gelora Bung Karno Stadium

4 September 1992 WC Qualifier	Solomon Islands	1–2	Australia	Honiara, Solomon Islands
	Vato 83'	Report	8' Veart; 86' McCulloch	Referee: (New Zealand) Gary Fleet

11 September 1992 WC Qualifier	Tahiti	0–3	Australia	Papeete, Tahiti
		Report	2' Mori; 44' Veart; 57' Wade	Referee: (New Zealand) Lennox Sharp

20 September 1992 WC Qualifier	Australia	2–0	Tahiti	Brisbane, Australia
	Veart 11'; Durakovic 62'	Report		Stadium: Perry Park; Referee: (Vanuatu) Kaltatak Kalokis

26 September 1992 WC Qualifier	Australia	6–1	Solomon Islands	Newcastle, Australia
	Genc 4'; Gray 60'; Wade 67'; Veart 83'; Brown 85'; Durakovic 88'	Report	Ashley 6'	Stadium: Hunter Stadium; Referee: (Fiji) Intaz Shah

=== 1993 ===
16 April 1993	Australia	1–0	Kuwait	Singapore
	Trimboli 10'	Report		Stadium: Singapore National Stadium

19 April 1993	Australia	1–3	Kuwait	Singapore
	Wade 18' (pen.)	Report	Mohammad 59'; Al Houwaidi 65'; Al Hadiyah 79'	Stadium: Singapore National Stadium

30 May 1993 WC Qualifier	Australia	1–0	New Zealand	Auckland, New Zealand
	Arnold 55'	Report		Stadium: Mount Smart Stadium; Attendance: 10,952; Referee: Bo Karlsson Sweden

6 June 1993 WC Qualifier	Australia	3–0	New Zealand	Melbourne, Australia
	Veart 1'; A Vidmar 3'; Zelic 49'	Report		Stadium: Olympic Park Stadium; Attendance: 10,000; Referee: Jacobs Ullenberg Netherlands

31 July 1993 WC Qualifier	Australia	1–2	Canada	Edmonton, Alberta, Canada
	Dasovic 44' (o.g.); Zabica (red card)	Report	Watson 52'; Mobilio 57'	Stadium: Commonwealth Stadium; Attendance: 27,775; Referee: Arturo Carter Mexico

15 August 1993 WC Qualifier	Australia	2–1 (3–3 on aggregate aet) (4–1 p)	Canada	Sydney, Australia
	Farina 46'; Durakovic 77'	Report	Hooper 55'	Stadium: Sydney Football Stadium; Attendance: 25,982; Referee: Shin-Ichiro Obata Japan
	Penalties
	Wade (penalty scored); Vidmar (penalty scored); Tobin (penalty scored); Farina (penalty scored)		(penalty scored) Mitchell; (penalty missed) Bunbury; (penalty missed) Sweeney

24 September 1993	Australia	1–1	South Korea	Seoul, South Korea
	Mori 85'	Report	Seo Jung-won 35'

26 September 1993	Australia	0–1	South Korea	Seoul, South Korea
		Report	Choi Moon-sik 75'

31 October 1993 WC Qualifier	Australia	1–1	Argentina	Sydney, Australia
	A Vidmar 43'	Report	Balbo 37'	Stadium: Sydney Football Stadium; Attendance: 43,967; Referee: Sandor Puhl Hungary

17 November 1993 WC Qualifier	Australia	0–1	Argentina	Buenos Aires, Argentina
		Report	Tobin 58' (o.g.)	Stadium: Estadio Monumental; Attendance: 59,768; Referee: Peter Mikkelsen Denmark

=== 1994 ===
22 May 1994 Kirin Cup	Australia	1–1	Japan	Hiroshima, Japan
17:00	A Vidmar 67'	Report	Asano 10'	Stadium: Big Arch Stadium; Attendance: 27,350; Referee: Pirom Un-Prasert Thailand

26 May 1994 Kirin Cup	Australia	0–1	France	Kobe, Japan
17:00		Report	Cantona 43'	Stadium: Kobe Universiade Memorial Stadium; Attendance: 16,743; Referee: Masayoshi Okada Japan

8 June 1994	Australia	1–0	South Africa	Adelaide, Australia
	A Vidmar 11'	[www.ozfootball.net/ark/Socceroo/1994A.html Report]		Stadium: Hindmarsh Stadium; Attendance: 10,203; Referee: Gerry Connolly Australia

12 June 1994	Australia	1–0	South Africa	Sydney, Australia
17:00	Polak 38' (pen.)	[www.ozfootball.net/ark/Socceroo/1994A.html Report]		Stadium: Sydney Football Stadium; Attendance: 17,769; Referee: Richard Lorenc Australia

24 September 1994	Australia	0–0	Kuwait	Kuala Lumpur, Malaysia
17:00		[www.ozfootball.net/ark/Socceroo/1994A.html Report]		Stadium: Stadium Merdeka

29 September 1994	Japan	0–0	Australia	Tokyo, Japan
17:00		[www.ozfootball.net/ark/Socceroo/1994A.html Report]		Stadium: National Stadium; Attendance: 44,253

=== 1995 ===
8 February 1995 Friendly Matches	Australia	0–0	Colombia	Brisbane, Australia
		Report		Stadium: Lang Park; Attendance: 13,212; Referee: (Australia) John Fraser

11 February 1995 Friendly Matches	Australia	0–1	Colombia	Sydney, Australia
		Report	66' Ricard	Stadium: Sydney Football Stadium; Attendance: 15,000; Referee: (Australia) Eugene Brazzale

15 February 1995 Friendly Matches	Australia	2–1	Japan	Sydney, Australia
	Markovski 6'; Corica 41'	Report	16' Hasegawa	Stadium: Sydney Football Stadium; Attendance: 4,541; Referee: (Australia) Richard Lorenc

18 June 1995 Friendly Matches	Australia	2–1	Ghana	Sydney, Australia
	Vidmar 5'; Arnold 37'	Report	82' Kumah	Stadium: Sydney Football Stadium; Attendance: 18,446; Referee: (Australia) Simon Micallef

21 June 1995 Friendly Matches	Australia	1–0	Ghana	Adelaide, Australia
	Veart 19'	Report		Stadium: Hindmarsh Stadium; Attendance: 7,000; Referee: (Australia) Gerry Connelly

24 June 1995 Friendly Matches	Australia	0–1	Ghana	Perth, Australia
		Report	32'Yahya	Stadium: WACA Ground; Attendance: 11,634; Referee: (Australia) Eddie Lennie

30 June 1995 Friendly Matches	Argentina	2–0	Australia	Quilmes, Argentina
	Balbo 7'; Batistuta 89'	Report		Stadium: Estadio Centenario; Attendance: 20,000; Referee: (Paraguay) U Aquino

10 November 1995 OFC Nations Cup Semi Final also Trans-Tasman Cup	New Zealand	0–0	Australia	Christchurch, New Zealand
		Report		Stadium: Queen Elizabeth II Park; Attendance: 8,000; Referee: (New Zealand) Barry Tasker

15 November 1995 OFC Nations Cup Semi Final also Trans-Tasman Cup	Australia	3–0	New Zealand	Newcastle, Australia
	Mori 33'; Wade 45' (pen.); Spiteri 51'	Report		Stadium: Breakers Stadium; Attendance: 8,858; Referee: (Australia) Simon Micallef

=== 1996 ===
10 February 1996 Friendly Matches	Australia	1–4	Japan	Wollongong, Australia
	Awaritefe 87'	Report	35' Yamaguchi; 60', 85' Takagi; 89' Moriyasu	Stadium: Brandon Park; Attendance: 8,396; Referee: (Australia) Brett Hugo

14 February 1996 Friendly Matches	Australia	3–0	Japan	Melbourne, Australia
	Mori 15'; Spiteri 70'; Bingley 74'	Report		Stadium: Lakeside Stadium; Attendance: 4,397

25 February 1996 Friendly Matches	Australia	0–2	Sweden	Brisbane, Australia
		Report	86', 87' Andersson	Stadium: Lang Park; Referee: (Australia) Eugene Brazzale

28 February 1996 Friendly Matches	Australia	0–0	Sweden	Sydney, Australia
		Report		Stadium: Sydney Football Stadium; Attendance: 13,905; Referee: (Australia) Eddie Lennie

27 March 1996 Friendly Matches	Scotland	1–0	Australia	Glasgow, United Kingdom (Scotland)
	Ally McCoist 53'	Report		Stadium: Hampden Park; Attendance: 20,608

24 April 1996 Friendly Matches	Chile	3–0	Australia	Antofagasta, Chile
	Zamorano 52', 82'; Valencia 62'	Report		Stadium: Estadio Regional de Antofagasta; Attendance: 30,000; Referee: (Argentina) Robert Ruscio

14 September 1996 Friendly Matches	Ghana	0–2	Australia	Durban, South Africa
		Report	46' Mori; 69' Trimboli	Stadium: Kings Park Stadium; Attendance: 46,000; Referee: (South Africa) Mathabela

18 September 1996 Friendly Matches	South Africa	2–0	Australia	Johannesburg, South Africa
	Moshoeu 13'; Williams 71'	Report		Stadium: Johannesburg Athletics Stadium; Attendance: 29,632; Referee: (Kenya) Suleiman Gharib

21 September 1996 Friendly Matches	Kenya	0–4	Australia	Pretoria, South Africa
		Report	32' Polak; 37' Spink; 68' Mori; 78' (pen.) Tobin	Stadium: Loftus Versveld; Attendance: 50,000; Referee: (South Africa) Ian McLeod

9 October 1996 Friendly Matches	Saudi Arabia	0–0	Australia	Riyadh, Saudi Arabia
		Report		Stadium: King Fahd International Stadium

27 October 1996 OFC Nations Cup Final	Tahiti	0–6	Australia	Papeete, Tahiti
		Report	5' Tapai; 20' Trimboli; 25', 28', 44', 89' Trajanovski	Stadium: Olympic Stadium; Attendance: 5,000; Referee: (New Zealand) Barry Tasker

1 November 1996 OFC Nations Cup Final	Australia	5–0	Tahiti	Canberra, Australia
	Hooker 11'; Trajanovski 21', 36', 54'; Raumati 31' (o.g.)	Report		Stadium: Bruce Stadium; Attendance: 9,421; Referee: (Fiji) Intaz Shah

=== 1997 ===
18 January 1997 Friendly match	Australia	1–0	New Zealand	Melbourne, Australia
	Bingley 24'	Report		Stadium: Lakeside Stadium; Attendance: 10,496; Referee: (Australia) Eugene Brazzale

22 January 1997 Friendly match	Australia	2–1	South Korea	Brisbane, Australia
	Bingley 36'; Edwards 72'	Report	76' Seok Ju	Stadium: Suncorp Stadium; Attendance: 15,161; Referee: (Australia) Simon Micallef

25 January 1997 Friendly match	Australia	1–0	Norway	Sydney, Australia
	Hooker 72'	Report		Stadium: Sydney Football Stadium; Attendance: 17,429; Referee: (Australia) Eddie Lennie

12 March 1997 Friendly match	Macedonia	0–1	Australia	Skopje, Macedonia
		Report	89' A. Vidmar	Stadium: Philip II Arena; Attendance: 5,000; Referee: (Kingdom of Yugoslavia) Slavko Radulovic

2 April 1997 Friendly match	Hungary	1–3	Australia	Budapest, Hungary
	Klausz 31'	Report	4', 90' A. Vidmar; 90' Muscat	Stadium: Nepstadion; Attendance: 15,000; Referee: (Germany) Hermann Albrecht

11 June 1997 WCQ Second round	Australia	13–0	Solomon Islands	Sydney, Australia
	Mori 2', 15', 37', 55', 82'; Aloisi 34', 54', 83', 88', 89'; Foster 69'; Tapai 80'; Bosnich 90' (pen.)			Stadium: Parramatta Stadium; Attendance: 3,127; Referee: (New Zealand) Bruce Grimshaw

13 June 1997 WCQ Second round	Australia	5–0	Tahiti	Sydney, Australia
	A. Vidmar 17'; Trimboli 43', 45'; Arnold 46'; Bingley 66'	Report		Stadium: Parramatta Stadium; Attendance: 2,869; Referee: (New Zealand) Brian Precious

17 June 1997 WCQ Second round	Australia	6–2	Solomon Islands	Sydney, Australia
	Slater 16'; Arnold 17'; Kaierea 39' (o.g.); Tapai 47', 51'; A. Vidmar 77' (pen.)	Report	63' Peli; 70' Suri	Stadium: Parramatta Stadium; Attendance: 2,122; Referee: (New Zealand) Brian Precious

19 June 1997 WCQ Second round	Australia	2–0	Tahiti	Sydney, Australia
	Zelic 10'; Trimboli 89'	Report		Stadium: Parramatta Stadium; Attendance: 2,918; Referee: (New Zealand) Bruce Grimshaw

28 June 1997 WCQ Final round	New Zealand	0–3	Australia	Auckland, New Zealand
		Report	18' Aloisi; 42' A. Vidmar; 66' Foster	Stadium: North Harbour Stadium; Attendance: 25,000; Referee: (Japan) Okada Masayoshi

6 July 1997 WCQ Final round	Australia	2–0	New Zealand	Sydney, Australia
	Zelic 6'; Arnold 42'	Report		Stadium: Parramatta Stadium; Attendance: 14,045; Referee: (Syria) Jamal Al Sharif

1 October 1997 Friendly match	Tunisia	0–3	Australia	Tunis, Tunisia
		Report	1' A. Vidmar; 23' Viduka; 76' Bingley	Stadium: El Menzah Olympic Stadium; Attendance: 20,000; Referee: (Algeria) Abderrahmane Ben Betka

22 November 1997 WCQ play-off	Iran	1–1	Australia	Tehran, Iran
	Azizi 40'	Report	19' Kewell	Stadium: Azadi Stadium; Attendance: 128,000; Referee: (Italy) Pierluigi Pairetto

29 November 1997 WCQ play-off	Australia	2–2	Iran	Melbourne, Australia
	Kewell 32'; A. Vidmar 48'	Report	71' Bagheri; 75' Azizi	Stadium: Melbourne Cricket Ground; Attendance: 98,000; Referee: (Hungary) Sándor Puhl

12 December 1997 Confederations Cup Group stage	Australia	3–1	Mexico	Riyadh, Saudi Arabia
	Viduka 45'; Aloisi 60'; Mori 90'	Report	81' (pen.) Hernández	Stadium: King Fahd Stadium; Attendance: 15,000; Referee: (Thailand) Pirom Un-Prasert

14 December 1997 Confederations Cup Group stage	Australia	0–0	Brazil	Riyadh, Saudi Arabia
		Report		Stadium: King Fahd Stadium; Attendance: 11,000; Referee: (Niger) Lucien Bouchardeau

16 December 1997 Confederations Cup Group stage	Saudi Arabia	1–0	Australia	Riyadh, Saudi Arabia
	Al-Khilaiwi 40'	Report		Stadium: King Fahd Stadium; Attendance: 20,000; Referee: (Argentina) Javier Castrilli

19 December 1997 Confederations Cup Semi-final	Australia	1–0	Uruguay	Riyadh, Saudi Arabia
	Kewell 90+2'	Report		Stadium: King Fahd Stadium; Attendance: 22,000; Referee: (Russia) Nikolai Levnikov

21 December 1997 Confederations Cup Final	Brazil	6–0	Australia	Riyadh, Saudi Arabia
	Ronaldo 15', 28', 59'; Romário 38', 53', 75' (pen.)	Report		Stadium: King Fahd Stadium; Attendance: 65,000; Referee: (Thailand) Pirom Un-Prasert

=== 1998 ===
7 February 1998 Friendly Matches	Australia	0–1	Chile	Melbourne, Australia
		Report	19' Acuna	Stadium: Olympic Park; Attendance: 12,000; Referee: (Australia) Gerry Connolly

11 February 1998 Friendly Matches	Australia	1–0	South Korea	Sydney, Australia
	46' Tapai	Report		Stadium: Sydney Football Stadium; Attendance: 9,823; Referee: (Australia) Brett Hugo

15 February 1998 Friendly Matches	Australia	0–3	Japan	Adelaide, Australia
		Report	6' (pen.) Nakata; 66', 70' Hirano	Stadium: Hindmarsh Stadium; Attendance: 9,541; Referee: (Australia) Mark Shield

6 June 1998 Friendly Matches	Croatia	7–0	Australia	Zagreb, Croatia
	14' (pen.), 37', 63' (pen.) Šuker; 47', 83' Boban; 40' Prosinečki; 72' Kozniku	Report		Stadium: Maksimir Stadium; Attendance: 12,000; Referee: (Austria) Gerd Grabher

25 September 1998 OFC Nations Cup Group Stage	Australia	3–1	Fiji	Brisbane, Australia
	2', 25', 44' Mori	Report	62' Masinisu	Stadium: Suncorp Stadium; Attendance: 900; Referee: (New Zealand) Bruce Grimshaw

28 September 1998 OFC Nations Cup Group Stage	Australia	16–0	Cook Islands	Brisbane, Australia
	1', 12', 63' Trimboli; 8', 15', 30', 34' Mori; 17', 89' Maloney; 42' Ceccoli; 48', 68', 76', 88' Trajanovski; 66' Chipperfield; 80' Halpin	Report		Stadium: Suncorp Stadium; Attendance: 900; Referee: (French Polynesia) Massimo Raveino

2 October 1998 OFC Nations Cup Semi Final	Australia	4–1	Tahiti	Brisbane, Australia
	1', 32', 81' Mori; 86' Veart	Report		Stadium: Suncorp Stadium; Attendance: 900; Referee: (Fiji) Intaz Shah

4 October 1998 OFC Nations Cup Final	Australia	0–1	New Zealand	Brisbane, Australia
		Report	24' Burton	Stadium: Suncorp Stadium; Attendance: 5,000; Referee: (French Polynesia) Massimo Raveino

6 November 1998 Friendly Matches	United States	0–0	Australia	San Jose, USA
		Report		Stadium: Spartan Stadium; Attendance: 15,074; Referee: (Canada) Mike Siefert

== See also ==
- Australia men's national soccer team results (2020–present)
- Australia men's national soccer team results (2000–2019)
- Australia men's national soccer team results (1950–1979)
- Australia men's national soccer team results (1922–1949)
- Australia men's national soccer team results (unofficial matches)
- Australia men's national soccer B team matches
