= 1988 in Australian soccer =

Soccer in Australia
- Season: 1988

Men's soccer
- NSL Premiership: Wollongong City
- NSL Championship: Marconi Fairfield
- NSL Cup: APIA Leichhardt

The 1988 season was the 19th season of national competitive soccer in Australia and 105th overall.

== National teams ==
=== Australia men's national soccer team ===
==== Results and fixtures ====
===== 1990 FIFA World Cup qualification =====
====== First round ======
26 November 1988	Fiji	1–0	Australia	Nadi, Fiji
	Madigi 66'	Report		Stadium: Prince Charles Park; Attendance: 6,000; Referee: Gary Fleet (New Zealand

3 December 1988	Australia	5–1	Fiji	Newcastle, Australia
	Yankos 9', 69' (pen.); Spink 25'; Arnold 84'; Trimboli 87'	Report	Dalai 89'	Stadium: Macquarie Field; Attendance: 6,000; Referee: Gary Fleet (New Zealand

===== 1988 Summer Olympics =====
====== Group D ======
Pos	Team	Pld	W	D	L	GF	GA	GD	Pts
1	Brazil	3	3	0	0	9	1	+8	6
2	Australia	3	2	0	1	2	3	−1	4
3	Yugoslavia	3	1	0	2	4	4	0	2
4	Nigeria	3	0	0	3	1	8	−7	0

Source: FIFA

18 September 1988	Australia	1–0	Yugoslavia	Gwangju, South Korea
	Farina 50'	Report		Stadium: Gwangju Mudeung Stadium; Attendance: 12,000; Referee: Juan Carlos Loustau (Argentina)

20 September 1988	Brazil	3–0	Australia	Seoul, South Korea
	Romário 19', 56', 59'	Report		Stadium: Dongdaemun Stadium; Attendance: 15,000; Referee: Karl-Heinz Tritschler (West Germany)

22 September 1988	Australia	1–0	Nigeria	Seoul, South Korea
	Kosmina 75'	Report		Stadium: Dongdaemun Stadium; Attendance: 12,800; Referee: Michał Listkiewicz (Poland)

====== Knockout stage ======
25 September 1988 QF	Soviet Union	3–0	Australia	Pusan, South Korea
	Dobrovolski 50' (pen.), 54' (pen.); Mikhaylichenko 62'	Report		Stadium: Kooduk Stadium; Attendance: 5,000; Referee: Juan Daniel Cardellino (Uruguay)

===== 1988 OFC Men's Olympic Qualifying Tournament =====
====== First round ======
26 February 1988	Australia	3–0	Chinese Taipei	Canberra, Australia
	Arnold 36', 71'; Davidson ?'	Report		Stadium: Bruce Stadium

====== Second round ======
Pos	Team	Pld	W	D	L	GF	GA	GD	Pts	Qualification	Australia	Israel	New Zealand	Chinese Taipei for Olympic games
1	Australia (H)	6	4	2	0	12	4	+8	10	Qualification for 1988 Summer Olympics	—	2–0	3–1	3–2
2	Israel	6	4	1	1	17	3	+14	9		0–0	—	2–0	5–1
3	New Zealand (H)	6	2	1	3	5	7	−2	5		1–1	0–1	—	2–0
4	Chinese Taipei	6	0	0	6	3	23	−20	0		0–3	0–9	0–1	—

Source: RSSSF
(H) Hosts

6 March 1988	Australia	2–0	Israel	Melbourne, Australia
	Yankos 71'; Farina 90+1'	Report		Stadium: Olympic Park; Attendance: 9,518; Referee: Hernán Silva (Chile)

9 March 1988	Australia	3–2	Chinese Taipei	Adelaide, Australia
	Tobin 21'; Crino 62'; Patikas 87'	Report	Chau-In 18'; I-Shiu 86'	Stadium: Hindmarsh Stadium; Attendance: 9,518

13 March 1988	Australia	3–1	New Zealand	Sydney, Australia
	Patikas 39'; Crino 60'; Farina 64'	Report	McGarry 56'	Stadium: Sydney Football Stadium; Referee: Hernán Silva (Chile)

20 March 1988	Israel	0–0	Australia	Christchurch, New Zealand
		Report		Stadium: Queen Elizabeth II Park; Referee: Georges Sandoz (Switzerland)

23 March 1988	New Zealand	1–1	Australia	Wellington, New Zealand
	McGarry 11' (pen.)	Report	Farina 74'	Stadium: Athletic Park; Referee: Georges Sandoz (Switzerland)

27 March 1988	Chinese Taipei	0–3	Australia	Auckland, New Zealand
		Report	Arnold 2'; Farina 19'; Wade 77'	Stadium: Eden Park

===== 1988 Australia Bicentenary Gold Cup =====
====== Group stage ======
Pos	Team	Pld	W	D	L	GF	GA	GD	Pts	Qualification
1	Brazil	3	2	1	0	5	1	+4	5	Advance to Final
2	Australia (H)	3	2	0	1	7	2	+5	4	Advance to Final
3	Argentina	3	0	2	1	3	6	−3	2	Advance to Third place play-off
4	Saudi Arabia	3	0	1	2	3	9	−6	1	Advance to Third place play-off

Source: RSSSF
(H) Hosts

7 July 1988	Australia	0–1	Brazil	Melbourne, Australia
		Report	Romário 31'	Stadium: Olympic Park; Attendance: 11,214; Referee: Richard Lorenc (Australia)

9 July 1988	Australia	3–0	Saudi Arabia	Sydney, Australia
	Ollerenshaw 6'; Farina 42', 81'	Report		Stadium: Sydney Football Stadium; Referee: Bill Monteverde (Australia)

14 July 1988	Australia	4–1	Argentina	Sydney, Australia
	Wade 4'; Yankos 42', 67' (pen.); Bozinovski 80'	Report	Ruggeri 31'	Stadium: Sydney Football Stadium; Referee: Gary Power (Australia)

====== Final ======
17 July 1988	Brazil	2–0	Australia	Sydney, Australia
	Romário 56', 67'	Report		Stadium: Sydney Football Stadium; Attendance: 28,161; Referee: Don Campbell (Australia)

===== 1988 Trans-Tasman Cup =====
12 October 1988	New Zealand	1–2	Australia	Dunedin, New Zealand
	Ironside 77'	Report	Crino 60'; Ollerenshaw 74'	Stadium: Caledonian Ground; Attendance: 3,000; Referee: Lennox Sharp (New Zealand)

16 October 1988	Australia	2–0	New Zealand	Bendigo, Australia
	Ironside 77'	Report		Stadium: Queen Elizabeth Oval; Attendance: 3,000; Referee: Chris Bambridge (Australia)

=== Australia women's national soccer team ===
==== Results and fixtures ====
===== Friendlies =====
1 June 1988	Australia	1–0	Brazil	Jiangmen, China
	Riddington ?'	Report

3 June 1988	Australia	3–0	Thailand	Jiangmen, China
	Dolan ?'; Murray ?'; Vinson ?'	Report

5 June 1988	Australia	0–3	Norway	Jiangmen, China
		Report

8 June 1988	China	7–0	Australia	Jiangmen, China
		Report

=== Australia men's national under-20 soccer team ===
==== Results and fixtures ====
===== 1988 OFC U-20 Championship =====
====== Group 2 ======
Pos	Team	Pld	W	D	L	GF	GA	GD	Pts	Qualification
1	Australia	2	2	0	0	11	1	+10	4	Advance to knockout stage
2	Chinese Taipei	2	1	0	1	4	8	−4	2	Advance to knockout stage
3	Vanuatu	2	0	0	2	2	8	−6	0	

Source: RSSSF

5 September 1989	Australia	5–0	Vanuatu	Suva, Fiji
		Report

6 September 1989	Australia	6–1	Chinese Taipei	Suva, Fiji
		Report

====== Knockout stage ======
8 September 1989 Semi-finals	Australia	4–2	Fiji	Suva, Fiji
		Report

10 September 1989 Final	Australia	1–0	New Zealand	Suva, Fiji
	Ilic 26'	Report

== Domestic soccer ==
=== National Soccer League ===
Pos	Team	Pld	W	D	L	GF	GA	GD	Pts	Qualification or relegation
1	Wollongong City	26	13	8	5	44	32	+12	34	Qualification for the Finals series
2	Sydney Croatia	26	15	4	7	38	30	+8	34	Qualification for the Finals series
3	South Melbourne	26	13	8	5	36	29	+7	34	Qualification for the Finals series
4	Marconi Fairfield (C)	26	12	8	6	46	26	+20	32	Qualification for the Finals series
5	Sydney Olympic	26	9	9	8	28	22	+6	27	Qualification for the Finals series
6	Adelaide City	26	10	7	9	36	35	+1	27	
7	Sunshine George Cross	26	11	5	10	38	39	−1	27	
8	St George-Budapest	26	10	6	10	41	35	+6	26	
9	Melbourne Croatia	26	9	6	11	28	33	−5	24	
10	Footscray JUST	26	7	9	10	34	32	+2	23	
11	APIA Leichhardt	26	8	7	11	28	35	−7	23	
12	Preston Makedonia	26	5	12	9	29	35	−6	22	
13	Brunswick Juventus (R)	26	7	5	14	31	43	−12	19	Relegation to the Victorian State League
14	Brisbane Lions (R)	26	4	4	18	28	59	−31	12	Relegation to the Brisbane Premier League

Source: rsssf.com
Rules for classification: 1) points; 2) goal difference; 3) number of goals scored.
(C) Champions; (R) Relegated

=== NSL Cup ===
==== Final ====
14 August 1988
14:30 AEST

APIA Leichhardt	0–0 (a.e.t.)	Brunswick Juventus
	Report
Penalties
Bertogna (penalty scored); McKinna (penalty scored); Yankos (penalty scored); Watson (penalty scored); de Marigny (penalty scored)	5–3	(penalty missed) Yzendoorn; (penalty scored) Egan; (penalty scored) Palatsides; (penalty scored) Marley

Marconi Stadium, Sydney
Attendance: 2,200
Referee: Alan Kibbler
