= Fiji 1–0 Australia (1990 FIFA World Cup qualification) =

1988 football match between Fiji and Australia

Fiji v Australia (1990 FIFA World Cup qualification)
- Event: 1990 FIFA World Cup qualification – OFC first round
Fiji	Australia
(Fiji)	(Australia)
1	0
- Date: 26 November 1988
- Venue: Prince Charles Park, Nadi
- Referee: Gary Fleet (New Zealand)
- Attendance: 6,472

On 26 November 1988, the Fiji national football team managed to get a 1–0 win at home against Australia in the first leg of the 1990 FIFA World Cup qualification first round. Going into the match, Australia were considered the large favourites, but a 67th minute goal from Fijian forward Ravuama Madigi saw the hosts walk away with a 1–0 win.

== Background ==
Australia were looking to try and return to the FIFA World Cup for the first time since 1974. Earlier in 1988, they had shocked 1986 FIFA World Cup winners Argentina by beating them 4–1 back in July during the Australia Bicentenary Gold Cup. Later in September, they played at the 1988 Summer Olympics, where they beat Yugoslavia 1–0 in the group stage and reached the quarter-finals, where they lost to eventual gold medalists the Soviet Union.

On the other hand, Fiji were entering FIFA World Cup qualification for only the second time in their history, having finished last in their group during 1982 FIFA World Cup qualification. At the time, they were on a 12 match unbeaten streak, with their last defeat being a 2–1 loss to New Zealand in September 1986.

This match was only the fourth time both countries faced each other, with the previous result in 1981 seeing Australia win 10–0 in Melbourne during 1982 FIFA World Cup qualification.

== The match ==
=== Prior to the match ===
For about a month prior to the match, Fiji's manager Billy Singh set up a training camp for the team to prepare. Matches during this time included the 1988 Melanesia Cup against New Caledonia, the Solomon Islands, and Vanuatu, as well as three friendlies against New Zealand, where they didn't lose a match. Meanwhile, Australia had not played a match in five weeks, with their last result being a 2–0 win against New Zealand in the Trans-Tasman Cup.

In an interview with The Sydney Morning Herald prior to the match, Singh called it the match of the player's lives, before stating that "normally they play for fun, but this time it is serious. They have tasted the glory of winning and they like it."

By the time Australia arrived in Fiji from Sydney, they got there three hours late, meaning they missed a day of training. When they were able to train the next day, it was on a bumpy pitch near Nadi International Airport. Additionally, when the Australian team passed Fiji team's hotel, one of the Fiji players gave them a black power salute. All of this helped to stir a feeling of impending doom amongst the Australian players prior to the match.

Because a win for Fiji was seen as unlikely, the Fiji Football Association offered each player a FJ$500 bonus if they managed to win.

=== The match ===
Australia's plan for the match was to 'get in, win, and get out'. While Australia played better for most of the match and had a majority of possession, they struggled to score a goal because of how Fiji's team were set up to frustrate. At half-time, Fiji substituted off forward Jone Watisoni for Ravuama Madigi.

In the 67th minute, Fijian defender Lote Delai sprinted down the left side of the field, before sending a knee-high cross into the box. Vimal Sami managed to pull off a dummy, allowing Ravuama Madigi to score with a left-footed volley, giving Fiji to a 1–0 lead. Despite their best attempts, Australia were unable to equalise, with Ali Ratfiq making a goal line save in the dying minutes to deny Australia. In the end, Fiji walked away with a 1–0 victory.

=== Match details ===
26 November 1988

Fiji	1–0	Australia
Madigi 67'	Report

Prince Charles Park, Nadi
Attendance: 6,472
Referee: Gary Fleet (New Zealand)

GK	Nasoni Buli
DF	Abraham Watkins
DF	Pita Dau (c)	(yellow card) 66'	(substituted off) 71'
DF	Dan Lutumailagi
DF	Maretino Nemani
DF	Lote Delai
MF	Meli Vuilabasa
MF	Vimal Sami
MF	Ivor Evans
FW	Simon Peters
FW	Jone Watisoni		(substituted off) 46'
Substitutions:
MF	Ali Ratfiq		(substituted on) 71'
FW	Ravuama Madigi		(substituted on) 46'
Manager:
(Fiji) Billy Singh

GK	Jeff Olver
DF	Gary van Egmond
DF	Charlie Yankos (c)
DF	Garry McDowall
DF	Graham Jennings
DF	Alan Davidson
MF	Mike Petersen	(substituted off) 66'
MF	Oscar Crino
FW	Warren Spink	(substituted off) 68'
FW	Graham Arnold
FW	Scott Ollerenshaw
Substitutions:
DF	Joe Palatsides	(substituted on) 66'
FW	Steve Maxwell	(substituted on) 68'
Manager:
(Socialist Federal Republic of Yugoslavia) Frank Arok

== After the match ==
In the second leg, Australia managed to win 5–1 to advance to the second round, in a match that saw an all-out brawl, with Australian captain Charlie Yankos having his nose broken by Jone Watsioni. In the second round, they finished as runners-up in the group behind Israel, failing to qualify for the 1990 FIFA World Cup. It would take until the 2006 FIFA World Cup for Australia to make their return to the tournament.

Later in life, Fijian defender Abraham Watkins called the match the best moment of his life. He won that year's Fijian Sportsman of the Year, becoming the first footballer to do so. It was also the last time a footballer won the award, until Iosefo Verevou won it in 2016.

In 2018, the Fiji Football Association honoured the surviving members of the match during that year's Inter-District Championship.
