= 1990 FIFA World Cup qualification – OFC first round =

Summaries of 1990 FIFA World Cup qualifications, OFC first round

This page provides the summaries of the Oceania Football Confederation (OFC) first round matches for 1990 FIFA World Cup qualification.

== Format ==
In this round four of the five teams were drawn into 2 home-and-away ties.

The 2 winners advanced to the second round of the OFC qualifiers.

== Matches ==
Team 1	Agg.	Team 2	1st leg	2nd leg
Chinese Taipei	1–8	New Zealand	0–4	1–4
Fiji	2–5	Australia	1–0	1–5

11 December 1988

Chinese Taipei	0–4	New Zealand
		36' Wright; 45' McClennan; 57' Barkley; 76' Halligan

Newtown Park, Wellington
Attendance: 2,500
Referee: Chris Bambridge (Australia)
15 December 1988

New Zealand	4–1	Chinese Taipei
Wright 12'; McClennan 17', 42', 49'		56' (o.g.) Lund

Western Springs Stadium, Auckland
Attendance: 7,500
Referee: Gary Power (Australia)

New Zealand won 8–1 on aggregate and advanced to the second round.

26 November 1988

Fiji	1–0	Australia
Madigi 66'

Prince Charles Park, Nadi
Attendance: 6,000
Referee: Gary Fleet (New Zealand)
3 December 1988

Australia	5–1	Fiji
Yankos 9', 69' (pen.); Spink 25'; Arnold 84'; Trimboli 87'		89' Dalai

Macquarie Field, Newcastle
Attendance: 5,220
Referee: Kenneth Wallace (New Zealand)

Australia won 5–2 on aggregate and advanced to the second round.

== See also ==
- 1990 FIFA World Cup qualification (OFC)
- 1990 FIFA World Cup qualification (CONMEBOL–OFC play-off)
