= 1990 FIFA World Cup qualification (OFC) =

Tournament details
- Dates: 11 December 1988 – 30 October 1989
- Teams: 5 (from 2 confederations)

Tournament statistics
- Matches played: 8
- Goals scored: 32 (4 per match)
- Attendance: 286,201 (35,775 per match)
- Top scorer(s): (Australia) Charlie Yankos (New Zealand) Darren McClennan (New Zealand) Billy Wright (4 goals each)

Listed below are the dates and results for the 1990 FIFA World Cup qualification rounds for the Oceanian zone (OFC).

Five teams entered the competition: OFC members Australia, New Zealand and Fiji, and non-OFC members Israel and Chinese Taipei. The Oceanian zone was allocated 0.5 places (out of 24) in the final tournament.

== Format ==
There were two rounds of play. In the first round Israel received a bye and advanced to the second round directly. The remaining four teams were paired up to play knockout matches on a home-and-away basis, with the aggregate winners advancing to the second round.

In the second round, the three remaining teams played against each other in a group on a home-and-away basis. The group winner advanced to the play-off against the CONMEBOL group winner with the weakest record.

== First round ==
Team 1	Agg.	Team 2	1st leg	2nd leg
Chinese Taipei	1–8	New Zealand	0–4	1–4
Fiji	2–5	Australia	1–0	1–5

=== Matches ===
11 December 1988	Chinese Taipei	0–4	New Zealand	Newtown Park, Wellington
			Wright 36'; McClennan 45'; Barkley 57'; Halligan 76'	Attendance: 2,500; Referee: Chris Bambridge (Australia)

15 December 1988	New Zealand	4–1	Chinese Taipei	Western Springs Stadium, Auckland
	Wright 12'; McClennan 17', 42', 49'		Lund 56' (o.g.)	Attendance: 7,500; Referee: Gary Power (Australia)

New Zealand won 8–1 on aggregate and advanced to the Second round.

26 November 1988	Fiji	1–0	Australia	Prince Charles Park, Nadi
	Madigi 66'			Attendance: 6,000; Referee: Gary Fleet (New Zealand)

3 December 1988	Australia	5–1	Fiji	Macquarie Field, Newcastle
	Yankos 9', 69' (pen.); Spink 25'; Arnold 84'; Trimboli 87'		Dalai 89'	Attendance: 5,220; Referee: Kenneth Wallace (New Zealand)

Australia won 5–2 on aggregate and advanced to the Second round.

== Second round ==
Pos	Team	Pld	W	D	L	GF	GA	GD	Pts	Qualification	Israel	Australia	New Zealand
1	Israel	4	1	3	0	5	4	+1	5	Advance to Inter-confederation play-offs	—	1–1	1–0
2	Australia	4	1	2	1	6	5	+1	4		1–1	—	4–1
3	New Zealand	4	1	1	2	5	7	−2	3		2–2	2–0	—

Source: RSSSF

=== Matches ===
5 March 1989	Israel	1–0	New Zealand	Ramat Gan, Israel
	Rosenthal 7'			Stadium: Ramat Gan Stadium; Attendance: 44,500; Referee: Serge Muhmenthaler (Switzerland)

12 March 1989	Australia	4–1	New Zealand	Sydney, Australia
	Crino 15'; Arnold 42', 55'; Yankos 77'		Dunford 70'	Stadium: Sydney Football Stadium; Attendance: 13,621; Referee: Shizuo Takada (Japan)

19 March 1989	Israel	1–1	Australia	Ramat Gan, Israel
	Ohana 67' (pen.)		Yankos 72'	Stadium: Ramat Gan Stadium; Attendance: 45,000; Referee: Manfred Neuner (West Germany)

2 April 1989	New Zealand	2–0	Australia	Auckland, New Zealand
	Dunford 19'; Wright 80'			Stadium: Mount Smart Stadium; Attendance: 3,340; Referee: Maidin Bin Singah (Singapore)

9 April 1989	New Zealand	2–2	Israel	Auckland, New Zealand
	Wright 19'; Dunford 35'		Rosenthal 16'; Klinger 37'	Stadium: Mount Smart Stadium; Attendance: 3,200; Referee: Claude Bouillet (France)

16 April 1989	Australia	1–1	Israel	Sydney, Australia
	Trimboli 88'		Ohana 40'	Stadium: Sydney Football Stadium; Attendance: 40,320; Referee: Carlo Longhi (Italy)

== Inter-confederation play-offs ==
The winning team of the OFC qualification tournament played the CONMEBOL group winner with the weakest record in a home-and-away play-off. The winner of this play-off qualified for the 1990 FIFA World Cup.

Team 1	Agg.	Team 2	1st leg	2nd leg
Colombia	1–0	Israel	1–0	0–0

== Goalscorers ==
4 goals

- (Australia) Charlie Yankos
- (New Zealand) Darren McClennan
- (New Zealand) Billy Wright

3 goals

- (Australia) Graham Arnold
- (New Zealand) Malcolm Dunford

2 goals

- (Australia) Paul Trimboli
- (Israel) Eli Ohana
- (Israel) Ronny Rosenthal

1 goal

- (Australia) Oscar Crino
- (Australia) Warren Spink
- (Fiji) Loten Dalai
- (Fiji) Ravuame Madigi
- (Israel) Nir Klinger
- (New Zealand) Noel Barkley
- (New Zealand) Danny Halligan

1 own goal

- (New Zealand) Garry Lund (playing against Chinese Taipei)

== See also ==
- 1990 FIFA World Cup qualification
- 1990 FIFA World Cup qualification (CONMEBOL–OFC play-off)
