= Ricki Herbert =

New Zealand footballer (born 1961)

Ricki Herbert CNZM
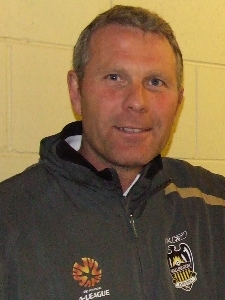
- Herbert as manager of Wellington Phoenix in 2008
- Born: Ricki Lloyd Herbert; 10 April 1961 (age 65); Auckland, New Zealand
Association football career
- Height: 1.80 m (5 ft 11 in)
- Position: Defender
Senior career*
Years	Team	Apps	(Gls)
1978	Mt Wellington AFC		
1979	Nelson United		
1980–1982	Mt Wellington AFC		
1983	Sydney Olympic FC	23	(0)
1984	Auckland University AFC		
1984–1986	Wolverhampton Wanderers	45	(0)
1986–1989	Mt Wellington AFC		
International career
- New Zealand U-20
1980–1989	New Zealand	61	(7)
Managerial career
- 1990–1992: Papakura City
- 1993–1995: Papatoetoe
- 1996–1999: Central United
- 1999–2005: New Zealand U-23
- 2001–2005: New Zealand (assistant)
- 2003–2005: New Zealand U-17
- 2005–2013: New Zealand
- 2006–2007: New Zealand Knights
- 2007–2013: Wellington Phoenix
- 2014–2015: NorthEast United
- 2015: Papua New Guinea U23
- 2015–2016: Maldives
- 2017–2019: Hamilton Wanderers
- 2020: Ba
- 2023–2024: Hamilton Wanderers (director of football)
Medal record
Men's football
Representing New Zealand (as manager)
OFC Nations Cup
Winner	2008
Bronze medal – third place	2012
- * Club domestic league appearances and goals

Ricki Lloyd Herbert CNZM (born 10 April 1961) is a New Zealand former footballer and manager. He is the current director of football at Hamilton Wanderers AFC.

Herbert was formerly head coach of the New Zealand national team, stepping down after the side failed to qualify for the 2014 FIFA World Cup. Herbert is the only New Zealander who participated to the World Cup as both a player, in the 1982 FIFA World Cup in Spain, and a manager, at the 2010 FIFA World Cup, famously leading them through the tournament unbeaten. His most recent role in international football was as the head coach of the Maldives national football team.

== Playing career ==
Herbert represented New Zealand at age group level, playing for the New Zealand under-20 side and gained 61 full international caps from 1980 to 1989, scoring seven goals.

Herbert made his full international début in a 4–0 win over Mexico on 20 August 1980 at the age of 19, and featured in all 15 matches of the All Whites' World Cup qualifying campaign for the 1982 FIFA World Cup in Spain. Herbert was a substitute for the loss against Scotland, but was reinstated to the starting eleven for both Soviet Union and Brazil as New Zealand failed to claim any points in their first World Cup finals appearance.

At club level, he represented a number of teams in his homeland and played in the Australian league. He had his greatest success with Mt Wellington AFC where he won three league championships during two spells with the club and two Chatham Cup triumphs.

In 1982 Herbert spent some time in England at Southampton F.C., where he made a few appearances for the reserve team and one disastrous friendly appearance for the first team. He also had a spell in English football with Wolverhampton Wanderers from 1984 to 1986, where he made 49 appearances in total. He was signed by manager Tommy Docherty who had previously coached Herbert while manager of Sydney Olympic. However, his time at the club coincided with them sliding down the leagues; Herbert was part of the team relegated to the third tier in 1985, but left in March 1986 shortly before a successive relegation after falling out with new manager Sammy Chapman.

== Coaching career ==
=== Early career ===
Herbert began his coaching career at Papakura City AFC in 1990, before taking over at neighbouring Papatoetoe AFC in 1993. From 1996 he took charge of Central United in the National Summer League, finishing mid table in his first season in charge. In both 1997 and 1998, Herbert took Central United to victory in the Chatham Cup and finished a close second in the league. In 1999, New Zealand reverted to separate North Island and South Island leagues, with the winners of each playing off for title of New Zealand Champion. Central United, winners of the North Island Soccer League, defeated the South Island winner, Dunedin Technical, 3–1, after extra time, in the championship final.

=== New Zealand ===
==== Oly-Whites and U17 ====
Herbert's domestic success attracted attention from NZ football association, and in 1999 he was appointed coach of the under-23 Oly-Whites qualifying campaign for the Sydney Olympics. An appointment of assistant national coach followed in 2001. In 2003 Herbert took charge of the New Zealand U-17 team.

As Director of Technical Development, Herbert was again responsible for New Zealand Olympic campaign in 2004, although they failed to qualify for the finals in Athens.

==== National team ====
Herbert was appointed All Whites coach on 25 February 2005, replacing Mick Waitt after being his assistant since 2003, with his first game in charge being scheduled in June that year as a friendly against archrival Australia. As national coach, the All Whites won their first match in Europe when beating Georgia 3–1 in Germany in May 2006. On that tour, which included a 4–0 loss to Brazil, the All Whites drew 1–1 with Estonia in Tallinn. Herbert was honoured New Zealand Coach of the Year for 2007. Herbert led the New Zealand national football team to the victory in the 2008 OFC Nations Cup, qualifying for the 2009 FIFA Confederations Cup in South Africa. Herbert is the second manager and only New Zealander to take New Zealand to the FIFA World Cup for a second time when his side qualified for the 2010 FIFA World Cup by winning World Cup qualifying play-off against Bahrain. On 15 June 2010, New Zealand drew 1–1 with Slovakia in their opening match in the World Cup Finals. This was their first ever point at a World Cup Finals and was earned when Winston Reid headed home a dramatic injury-time equaliser. Herbert described the draw as the "best ever result" for the New Zealand national team. In New Zealand's second game in the tournament, they held reigning world champions Italy to a memorable draw. The All Whites' third game of the 2010 FIFA World Cup was against Paraguay. The outcome was a nil-all draw, meaning New Zealand did not advance to the second round. New Zealand ended up becoming the only 'undefeated' team in the tournament.

Herbert announced his retirement following the All Whites' 4–2 loss to Mexico in November 2013, failing to qualify for the 2014 World Cup.

=== New Zealand Knights ===
In December 2006, after FFA announced that it had revoked the 2006 season A-League licence held by the Knights' owners, Herbert took over the reins of the now defunct New Zealand Knights under an arrangement between the FFA and NZ Soccer whereby the national body would step in to manage the club to meet their commitments for the remaining five games of the season. In that time the franchise won three matches, drew one and lost to competition winners Melbourne Victory.

=== Wellington Phoenix ===
In 2007 the new A-League franchise, Wellington Phoenix was granted a three-year license, and owner Terry Serepisos and Herbert immediately confirmed as head coach. On 26 February 2013, Herbert resigned from his role as head coach and took on an advisory role within the club.

=== NorthEast United FC (India) ===
On 19 August 2014, he was named as the manager of NorthEast United FC in the inaugural Indian Super League. On 13 October 2014, the team won their first ISL match at the Indira Gandhi Stadium, Spaniard Koke scoring the only goal of the game to defeat the Kerala Blasters.

=== 2014 FIFA World Cup (Brazil) ===
Herbert was appointed to FIFA's Technical Study Group to analyse tactical and technical dimensions of play at the 2014 FIFA World Cup in Brazil.

=== Papua New Guinea ===
In July 2015, Herbert coached the Papua New Guinea Under 23 side to a bronze medal at the 2015 Pacific Games in Port Moresby, Papua New Guinea.

=== Maldives ===
Herbert was appointed head coach of the Maldives on 9 September 2015. He sought an early termination to his two-year contract in June 2016 after 14 games in charge of the national side.

=== Waikato, New Zealand ===
In September 2016, Herbert announced he was taking up a new coaching role as Director of Football for St Peter's, Cambridge, and as Technical Director for Cambridge FC, one of the biggest clubs in the Waikato region. In May 2017, Herbert was announced as the head coach for Hamilton Wanderers AFC in the New Zealand Football Championship, providing him with a summer role that complements his winter coaching commitments.

=== Qualifications ===
Herbert holds a UEFA 'A' International Coaching Licence, and UEFA 'Pro' International Coaching Licence course that finished in June 2008.

=== Football academy ===
In 2014, Herbert established the Ricki Herbert Football Academy in New Zealand, providing coaching for boys and girls aged 4–17. By 2016, the academy was operating seven talent centres in New Zealand and had announced a partnership with Fulham, an English professional football club playing in the Championship.

== Personal life ==
Herbert comes from a successful sporting family. His mother, Shirley, was a champion sprinter while his father, Clive, was a professional cyclist. His father was also a long-time football administrator, represented New Zealand as an official at the 1968 Summer Olympics in Mexico, and was a professional trainer of standardbred harness racing horses. Herbert's son, Kale, is a professional football coach, working as head coach for the Ricki Herbert Football Academy and as head coach for Hamilton Wanderers who play in the New Zealand Football Championship in New Zealand.

A biography of Herbert's life, A New Fire, written by Russell Gray, was published in New Zealand by HarperCollins in 2009.

== Managerial statistics ==
As of 8 June 2016

Team	Nat	From	To	Record				
Team	Nat	From	To	G	W	D	L	Win %
New Zealand	(New Zealand)	25 February 2005	21 November 2013	60	22	14	24	36.7
New Zealand Knights	(New Zealand)	14 December 2006	21 January 2007	5	3	1	1	60.00
Wellington Phoenix	(New Zealand)	19 March 2007	26 February 2013	154	53	36	65	34.42
NorthEast United	(India)	13 October 2014	20 December 2014	14	3	6	5	21.43
Maldives	(Maldives)	9 September 2015	2 June 2016	14	6	1	7	42.86
Total				247	87	58	102	35.22

== New Zealand record ==
=== Player ===
New Zealand's goal tally first.

New Zealand matches as player
#	Date	Venue	Opponent	Result	Competition	Goal
1980
1	20 August	Bill McKinlay Park, Auckland	Mexico	4–0	International match	
2	15 September	Empire Stadium, Vancouver	Canada	0–4	International match	
3	18 September	Commonwealth Stadium, Edmonton	Canada	0–3	International match	
1981
4	25 April	Mount Smart Stadium, Auckland	Australia	3–3	1982 FIFA World Cup qualification	
5	3 May	Govind Park, Ba	Fiji	4–0	1982 FIFA World Cup qualification	
6	7 May	Municipal Stadium, Taipei	Chinese Taipei	0–0	1982 FIFA World Cup qualification	
7	11 May	Gelora Bung Karno Stadium, Jakarta	Indonesia	2–0	1982 FIFA World Cup qualification	
8	16 May	Sydney Cricket Ground, Sydney	Australia	2–0	1982 FIFA World Cup qualification	
9	23 May	Mount Smart Stadium, Auckland	Indonesia	5–0	1982 FIFA World Cup qualification	
10	30 May	Mount Smart Stadium, Auckland	Chinese Taipei	2–0	1982 FIFA World Cup qualification	
11	16 August	Mount Smart Stadium, Auckland	Fiji	13–0	1982 FIFA World Cup qualification	
12	24 September	Workers Stadium, Beijing	China	0–0	1982 FIFA World Cup qualification	
13	3 October	Mount Smart Stadium, Auckland	China	1–0	1982 FIFA World Cup qualification	1
14	10 October	Mount Smart Stadium, Auckland	Kuwait	1–2	1982 FIFA World Cup qualification	
15	28 November	Mount Smart Stadium, Auckland	Saudi Arabia	2–2	1982 FIFA World Cup qualification	1
16	14 December	Mohammed Al-Hamad Stadium, Kuwait City	Kuwait	2–2	1982 FIFA World Cup qualification	
17	19 December	Riyadh	Saudi Arabia	5–0	1982 FIFA World Cup qualification	
1982
18	10 January	Kallang National Stadium, Singapore	China	2–1	1982 FIFA World Cup qualification	
19	15 June	Estadio La Rosaleda, Málaga	Scotland	2–5	1982 FIFA World Cup	
20	19 June	Estadio La Rosaleda, Málaga	Soviet Union	0–3	1982 FIFA World Cup	
21	23 June	Estadio Benito Villamarín, Seville	Brazil	0–4	1982 FIFA World Cup	
1983
22	22 February	Mount Smart Stadium, Auckland	Australia	2–1	Trans-Tasman Cup	1
23	27 February	Olympic Park, Melbourne	Australia	2–0	Trans-Tasman Cup	
24	7 June	Dongdaemun Stadium, Seoul	Ghana	2–0	1983 President's Cup	1
25	9 June	Daegu Civic Stadium, Daegu	Sudan	1–1	1983 President's Cup	
26	16 August	National Stadium, Suva	Fiji	0–2	International match	
27	18 August	Prince Charles Park, Nadi	Fiji	1–0	International match	
28	25 September	Mount Smart Stadium, Auckland	Japan	3–1	1984 Olympic Games qualification	
29	1 October	Mount Smart Stadium, Auckland	Chinese Taipei	2–0	1984 Olympic Games qualification	
30	7 October	Olympic Stadium, Tokyo	Japan	1–0	1984 Olympic Games qualification	
31	12 October	Zhongshan Soccer Stadium, Taipei	Chinese Taipei	1–1	1984 Olympic Games qualification	
1984
32	31 March	Basin Reserve, Wellington	Malaysia	2–0	International match	
33	3 April	English Park, Christchurch	Malaysia	6–1	International match	
34	8 April	Mount Smart Stadium, Auckland	Malaysia	0–0	International match	
35	15 April	National Stadium, Singapore	Saudi Arabia	1–3	1984 Olympic Games qualification	1
36	19 April	National Stadium, Singapore	Kuwait	0–2	1984 Olympic Games qualification	
37	22 April	National Stadium, Singapore	South Korea	0–2	1984 Olympic Games qualification	
38	24 April	National Stadium, Singapore	Bahrain	0–1	1984 Olympic Games qualification	
39	18 October	Churchill Park, Lautoka	Fiji	2–1	International match	
40	20 October	National Stadium, Suva	Fiji	1–1	International match	
1985
41	3 November	Sydney Sports Ground, Sydney	Australia	0–2	1986 FIFA World Cup qualification	
1986
42	17 September	Churchill Park, Lautoka	Fiji	4–2	International match	2
43	19 September	National Stadium, Suva	Fiji	2–1	International match	
44	25 October	Mount Smart Stadium, Auckland	Australia	1–1	Trans-Tasman Cup	
45	2 November	Parramatta Stadium, Sydney	Australia	1–2	Trans-Tasman Cup	
1987
46	7 November	Apia Park, Apia	Western Samoa	7–0	1988 Olympic Games qualification	
1988
47	6 March	Olympic Park, Melbourne	Chinese Taipei	1–0	1988 Olympic Games qualification	
48	9 March	Hindmarsh Stadium, Adelaide	Israel	0–2	1988 Olympic Games qualification	
49	13 March	Sydney Football Stadium, Sydney	Australia	1–3	1988 Olympic Games qualification	
50	20 March	Queen Elizabeth II Park, Christchurch	Chinese Taipei	2–0	1988 Olympic Games qualification	
51	23 March	Athletic Park, Wellington	Australia	1–1	1988 Olympic Games qualification	
52	27 March	Eden Park, Auckland	Israel	0–1	1988 Olympic Games qualification	
53	21 June	Olympic Park, Melbourne	Saudi Arabia	2–0	International match	
54	23 June	Middle Park, Melbourne	Saudi Arabia	3–2	Friendly	
55	12 October	Caledonian Ground, Dunedin	Australia	1–2	Trans-Tasman Cup	
56	11 December	Newtown Park, Wellington	Chinese Taipei	4–0	1990 FIFA World Cup qualification	
57	15 December	Western Springs Stadium, Auckland	Chinese Taipei	4–1	1990 FIFA World Cup qualification	
1989
58	5 March	Ramat Gan Stadium, Tel Aviv	Israel	0–1	1990 FIFA World Cup qualification	
59	12 March	Sydney Football Stadium, Sydney	Australia	1–4	1990 FIFA World Cup qualification	
60	2 April	Mount Smart Stadium, Auckland	Australia	2–0	1990 FIFA World Cup qualification	
61	9 April	Mount Smart Stadium, Auckland	Israel	2–2	1990 FIFA World Cup qualification	

=== Manager ===
New Zealand's goal tally first.

New Zealand matches as manager
#	Date	Venue	Opponent	Result	Goalscorers	Competition
2005
1	9 June	Craven Cottage, London	Australia	0–1		International match
2006
2	19 February	Queen Elizabeth II Park, Christchurch	Malaysia	1–0	Old	International match
3	23 February	North Harbour Stadium, Auckland	Malaysia	2–1	Banks	International match
3	23 February	North Harbour Stadium, Auckland	Malaysia	2–1	Barron	International match
4	25 April	Estadio El Teniente, Rancagua	Chile	1–4	Smeltz	International match
5	27 April	Estadio Nacional de Chile, Santiago	Chile	0–1		International match
6	24 May	Szusza Ferenc Stadium, Budapest	Hungary	0–2		International match
7	27 May	Stadion Altenkirchen, Altenkirchen	Georgia	3–1	Coveny (2)	International match
7	27 May	Stadion Altenkirchen, Altenkirchen	Georgia	3–1	Killen	International match
8	31 May	A. Le Coq Arena, Tallinn	Estonia	1–1	Hay	International match
9	4 June	Stade de Genève, Geneva	Brazil	0–4		International match
2007
10	24 March	Estadio Ricardo Saprissa, San José	Costa Rica	0–4		International match
11	28 March	Estadio José Romero, Maracaibo	Venezuela	0–5		International match
12	26 May	Racecourse Ground, Wrexham	Wales	2–2	Smeltz (2)	International match
#	6 June	Olympic Stadium, Kyiv	Ukraine	P–P		International match
#	13 October	North Harbour Stadium, Auckland	Fiji	P–P		2008 OFC Nations Cup
13	17 October	Churchill Park, Lautoka	Fiji	2–0	Vicelich	2008 OFC Nations Cup
13	17 October	Churchill Park, Lautoka	Fiji	2–0	Smeltz	2008 OFC Nations Cup
14	17 November	Korman Stadium, Port Vila	Vanuatu	2–1	Smeltz	2008 OFC Nations Cup
14	17 November	Korman Stadium, Port Vila	Vanuatu	2–1	Mulligan	2008 OFC Nations Cup
15	21 November	Westpac Stadium, Wellington	Vanuatu	4–1	Mulligan (2)	2008 OFC Nations Cup
15	21 November	Westpac Stadium, Wellington	Vanuatu	4–1	Smeltz (2)	2008 OFC Nations Cup
2008
16	6 September	Stade Numa-Daly Magenta, Nouméa	New Caledonia	3–1	Sigmund	2008 OFC Nations Cup
16	6 September	Stade Numa-Daly Magenta, Nouméa	New Caledonia	3–1	Smeltz (2)	2008 OFC Nations Cup
17	10 September	North Harbour Stadium, Auckland	New Caledonia	3–0	Smeltz (2)	2008 OFC Nations Cup
17	10 September	North Harbour Stadium, Auckland	New Caledonia	3–0	Christie	2008 OFC Nations Cup
18	19 November	Churchill Park, Lautoka	Fiji	0–2		2008 OFC Nations Cup
2009
19	28 March	Suphachalasai Stadium, Bangkok	Thailand	1–3	Bright	International match
#	1 April	Gelora Bung Karno Stadium, Jakarta	Indonesia	P–P		International match
20	3 June	National Stadium, Dar es Salaam	Tanzania	1–2	Smeltz	International match
21	6 June	Botswana National Stadium, Gaborone	Botswana	0–0		International match
22	10 June	Atteridgeville Super Stadium, Pretoria	Italy	3–4	Smeltz	International match
22	10 June	Atteridgeville Super Stadium, Pretoria	Italy	3–4	Killen (2)	International match
23	14 June	Royal Bafokeng Stadium, Rustenburg	Spain	0–5		2009 FIFA Confederations Cup
24	17 June	Royal Bafokeng Stadium, Rustenburg	South Africa	0–2		2009 FIFA Confederations Cup
25	20 June	Ellis Park, Johannesburg	Iraq	0–0		2009 FIFA Confederations Cup
#	5 September	King Abdullah Stadium, Amman	Iraq	P–P		International match
26	9 September	King Abdullah Stadium, Amman	Jordan	3–1	Smeltz (2)	International match
26	9 September	King Abdullah Stadium, Amman	Jordan	3–1	Fallon	International match
27	10 October	Bahrain National Stadium, Riffa	Bahrain	0–0		2010 FIFA World Cup qualification
28	14 November	Westpac Stadium, Wellington	Bahrain	1–0	Fallon	2010 FIFA World Cup qualification
2010
29	3 March	The Rose Bowl, Pasadena	Mexico	0–2		International match
30	24 May	MCG, Melbourne	Australia	1–2	Killen	International match
31	29 May	Hypo-Arena, Klagenfurt	Serbia	1–0	Smeltz	International match
32	4 June	Ljudski vrt, Maribor	Slovenia	1–3	Fallon	International match
33	15 June	Royal Bafokeng Stadium, Rustenburg	Slovakia	1–1	Reid	2010 FIFA World Cup
34	20 June	Mbombela Stadium, Nelspruit	Italy	1–1	Smeltz	2010 FIFA World Cup
35	24 June	Peter Mokaba Stadium, Polokwane	Paraguay	0–0		2010 FIFA World Cup
36	9 October	North Harbour Stadium, Auckland	Honduras	1–1	Wood	International match
37	12 October	Westpac Stadium, Wellington	Paraguay	0–2		International match
2011
38	25 March	Wuhan Sports Center Stadium, Wuhan	China	1–1	McGlinchey	International match
#	29 March	Olympic Stadium, Tokyo	Japan	P–P		International match
39	1 June	Invesco Field at Mile High, Denver	Mexico	0–3		International match
40	5 June	Adelaide Oval, Adelaide	Australia	0–3		International match
2012
41	29 February	Mount Smart Stadium, Auckland	Jamaica	2–3	Wood	International match
41	29 February	Mount Smart Stadium, Auckland	Jamaica	2–3	Killen	International match
42	23 May	BBVA Compass Stadium, Houston	El Salvador	2–2	Hogg	International match
42	23 May	BBVA Compass Stadium, Houston	El Salvador	2–2	Barbarouses	International match
43	26 May	Cotton Bowl Stadium, Dallas	Honduras	1–0	Smeltz	International match
44	2 June	Lawson Tama Stadium, Honiara	Fiji	1–0	Smith	2012 OFC Nations Cup
45	4 June	Lawson Tama Stadium, Honiara	Papua New Guinea	2–1	Smeltz	2012 OFC Nations Cup
45	4 June	Lawson Tama Stadium, Honiara	Papua New Guinea	2–1	Wood	2012 OFC Nations Cup
46	6 June	Lawson Tama Stadium, Honiara	Solomon Islands	1–1	Wood	2012 OFC Nations Cup
47	8 June	Lawson Tama Stadium, Honiara	New Caledonia	0–2		2012 OFC Nations Cup
48	10 June	Lawson Tama Stadium, Honiara	Solomon Islands	4–3	Wood (3)	2012 OFC Nations Cup
48	10 June	Lawson Tama Stadium, Honiara	Solomon Islands	4–3	Smeltz	2012 OFC Nations Cup
49	7 September	Stade Numa-Daly Magenta, Nouméa	New Caledonia	2–0	Smeltz	2014 FIFA World Cup qualification
49	7 September	Stade Numa-Daly Magenta, Nouméa	New Caledonia	2–0	Wood	2014 FIFA World Cup qualification
50	11 September	North Harbour Stadium, Auckland	Solomon Islands	6–1	Smeltz	2014 FIFA World Cup qualification
50	11 September	North Harbour Stadium, Auckland	Solomon Islands	6–1	Barbarouses	2014 FIFA World Cup qualification
50	11 September	North Harbour Stadium, Auckland	Solomon Islands	6–1	Killen	2014 FIFA World Cup qualification
50	11 September	North Harbour Stadium, Auckland	Solomon Islands	6–1	Lochhead	2014 FIFA World Cup qualification
50	11 September	North Harbour Stadium, Auckland	Solomon Islands	6–1	Wood	2014 FIFA World Cup qualification
50	11 September	North Harbour Stadium, Auckland	Solomon Islands	6–1	Rojas	2014 FIFA World Cup qualification
51	12 October	Stade Hamuta, Papeete	Tahiti	2–0	Smeltz	2014 FIFA World Cup qualification
51	12 October	Stade Hamuta, Papeete	Tahiti	2–0	Sigmund	2014 FIFA World Cup qualification
52	16 October	AMI Stadium, Christchurch	Tahiti	3–0	McGlinchey (2)	2014 FIFA World Cup qualification
52	16 October	AMI Stadium, Christchurch	Tahiti	3–0	Killen	2014 FIFA World Cup qualification
53	14 November	Hongkou Football Stadium, Shanghai	China	1–1	Wood	International match
2013
54	22 March	Forsyth Barr Stadium, Dunedin	New Caledonia	2–1	Killen	2014 FIFA World Cup qualification
54	22 March	Forsyth Barr Stadium, Dunedin	New Caledonia	2–1	Smith	2014 FIFA World Cup qualification
55	26 March	Lawson Tama Stadium, Honiara	Solomon Islands	2–0	Payne (2)	2014 FIFA World Cup qualification
56	5 September	King Fahd International Stadium, Riyadh	Saudi Arabia	1–0	Killen	2013 OSN Cup
57	9 September	King Fahd International Stadium, Riyadh	United Arab Emirates	0–2		2013 OSN Cup
58	15 October	Hasely Crawford Stadium, Port of Spain	Trinidad and Tobago	0–0		International match
59	14 November	Estadio Azteca, Mexico City	Mexico	1–5	James	2014 FIFA World Cup qualification
60	20 November	Westpac Stadium, Wellington	Mexico	2–4	James	2014 FIFA World Cup qualification
60	20 November	Westpac Stadium, Wellington	Mexico	2–4	Fallon	2014 FIFA World Cup qualification

=== International career statistics ===
New Zealand national team
Year	Apps	Goals
1980	3	0
1981	14	2
1982	4	0
1983	10	2
1984	9	1
1985	1	0
1986	4	2
1987	1	0
1988	11	0
1989	4	0
Total	61	7

== Honours ==
=== Individual ===
- New Zealand Young Player of the Year: 1980
- New Zealand coach of the year: 2007, 2010
- Companion of the New Zealand Order of Merit: 2011 New Year Honours

=== Club ===
Mt Wellington AFC

- Chatham Cup: 1980, 1982
- New Zealand Champions: 1980, 1982, 1986

Sydney Olympic FC

- Australian National Soccer League Cup: 1983

=== As manager ===
Central United

- Chatham Cup: 1997, 1998
- New Zealand Champions: 1999

New Zealand

- OFC Nations Cup: 2008
