= 1990 FIFA World Cup qualification – OFC second round =

Football tournament qualification stage

This page provides the summaries of the Oceania Football Confederation (OFC) second round matches for 1990 FIFA World Cup qualification.

== Format ==
In this round Israel who was awarded a bye into the Second Round played Australia and New Zealand who won in the First Round.

The winners, Israel, advanced to the play-off against the CONMEBOL group winners, Colombia, with the weakest record.

== Standings ==
Pos	Team	Pld	W	D	L	GF	GA	GD	Pts	Qualification	Israel	Australia	New Zealand
1	Israel	4	1	3	0	5	4	+1	5	Advance to Inter-confederation play-offs	—	1–1	1–0
2	Australia	4	1	2	1	6	5	+1	4		1–1	—	4–1
3	New Zealand	4	1	1	2	5	7	−2	3		2–2	2–0	—

Source: RSSSF

== Matches ==
5 March 1989

Israel	1–0	New Zealand
Rosenthal 7'

Ramat Gan Stadium, Ramat Gan, Israel
Attendance: 44,500
Referee: Serge Muhmenthaler (Switzerland)
12 March 1989

Australia	4–1	New Zealand
Crino 15'; Arnold 42', 55'; Yankos 77'		70' Dunford

Sydney Football Stadium, Sydney, Australia
Attendance: 13,621
Referee: Shizuo Takada (Japan)
19 March 1989

Israel	1–1	Australia
Ohana 67' (pen.)		72' Yankos

Ramat Gan Stadium, Ramat Gan, Israel
Attendance: 45,000
Referee: Manfred Neuner (West Germany)
2 April 1989

New Zealand	2–0	Australia
Dunford 19'; Wright 80'

Mount Smart Stadium, Auckland, New Zealand
Attendance: 3,340
Referee: Maidin Bin Singah (Singapore)
9 April 1989

New Zealand	2–2	Israel
Wright 19'; Dunford 35'		16' Rosenthal; 37' Klinger

Mount Smart Stadium, Auckland, New Zealand
Attendance: 3,200
Referee: Claude Bouillet (France)
16 April 1989

Australia	1–1	Israel
Trimboli 88'		40' Ohana

Sydney Football Stadium, Sydney, Australia
Attendance: 40,320
Referee: Carlo Longhi (Italy)

== See also ==
- 1990 FIFA World Cup qualification (CONMEBOL–OFC play-off)
- 1990 FIFA World Cup qualification (OFC)
