= Australia Bicentenary Gold Cup =

Association football tournament

- Organiser(s): Football Australia
- Founded: 1988
- Abolished: 1988; 38 years ago
- Region: Australia
- Teams: 4
- Related competitions: Brazil Independence Cup
- Last champions: Brazil

Australia Bicentenary Gold Cup
Tournament details
- Host country: Australia
- Dates: 6–17 July 1988
- Teams: 4
- Venues: 3 (in 3 host cities)

Final positions
- Champions: Brazil (1st title)
- Runners-up: Australia
- Third place: Argentina

Tournament statistics
- Matches played: 8
- Goals scored: 22 (2.75 per match)
- Top scorer(s): (Australia) Charlie Yankos (Australia) Frank Farina (Argentina) Hernán Díaz (Brazil) Romário (Brazil) Geovani (Saudi Arabia) Majed Abdullah (2 goals)

The 1988 Australian Bicentennial Gold Cup was a one-off association football tournament to celebrate the bincentennial of first settlement at Port Jackson by Captain Arthur Phillip in 1788. It was contested by 1988 AFC Asian Cup winners Saudi Arabia, 1986 FIFA World Cup winners Argentina, world number one-ranked side Brazil and host nation Australia.

The tournament was particularly notable for Australian fans for a remarkable extreme-long range goal scored by Charlie Yankos in Australia's unexpected 4–1 win over then World Champions Argentina. Brazil were eventual winners, beating Australia 2–0 in the final. Argentina took out 3rd place beating Saudi Arabia 2–0 in the third place match.

== Participants ==
- Argentina
- Australia
- Brazil
- Saudi Arabia

== Format ==
Teams played each other once in a round robin group stage. Each team was awarded 2 points for a win, 1 for a draw and 0 for a loss. The top two teams from the group played in a final and the bottom two teams played in a 3rd place match.

== Summary ==
=== Group stage ===
| Pos | Team | Pld | W | D | L | GF | GA | GD | Pts | Qualification |
|---|---|---|---|---|---|---|---|---|---|---|
| 1 | Brazil | 3 | 2 | 1 | 0 | 5 | 1 | +4 | 5 | Advance to Final |
| 2 | Australia (H) | 3 | 2 | 0 | 1 | 7 | 2 | +5 | 4 | Advance to Final |
| 3 | Argentina | 3 | 0 | 2 | 1 | 3 | 6 | −3 | 2 | Advance to Third place play-off |
| 4 | Saudi Arabia | 3 | 0 | 1 | 2 | 3 | 9 | −6 | 1 | Advance to Third place play-off |

Source: RSSSF
(H) Hosts
6 July 1988

| Argentina | 2–2 | Saudi Arabia |
|---|---|---|
| Díaz 27', 50' (pen.) | Report | Majed Abdullah 41'; Díaz 61' (o.g.) |

Football Park, Adelaide
Attendance: 9,664
Referee: Barry Harwood (Australia)

7 July 1988

| Australia | 0–1 | Brazil |
|---|---|---|
| | Report | Romario 31' |

Olympic Park Stadium, Melbourne
Attendance: 11,214
Referee: Richard Lorenc (Australia)

9 July 1988

| Australia | 3–0 | Saudi Arabia |
|---|---|---|
| Ollerenshaw 6'; Farina 42', 81' | Report |

Parramatta Stadium, Sydney
Attendance: 11,396
Referee: Bill Monteverde (Australia)

10 July 1988

| Brazil | 0–0 | Argentina |
|---|---|---|
| | Report |

Olympic Park Stadium, Melbourne
Referee: Donald Campbell (Australia)

13 July 1988

| Brazil | 4–1 | Saudi Arabia |
|---|---|---|
| Geovani 27' (pen.), 50'; Jorginho 28'; Edmar 40' | Report | Majed Abdullah 30' |

Olympic Park Stadium, Melbourne
Attendance: 3,200
Referee: Chris Bambridge (Australia)

14 July 1988

| Australia | 4–1 | Argentina |
|---|---|---|
| Wade 2'; Yankos 42', 67' (pen.); Bozinovski 80' | Report | Ruggeri 31' |

Sydney Football Stadium, Sydney
Attendance: 18,985
Referee: Gary Power (Australia)

=== Third place play-off ===
16 July 1988

| Argentina | 2–0 | Saudi Arabia |
|---|---|---|
| Simeone 4'; Dertycia 23' | Report |

Bruce Stadium, Canberra
Attendance: 2,729
Referee: Gary Power (Australia)

=== Final ===
17 July 1988

| Australia | 0–2 | Brazil |
|---|---|---|
| | Report | Romario 56'; Müller 67' |

Sydney Football Stadium, Sydney
Attendance: 28,161
Referee: Donald Campbell (Australia)

| Australia | Brazil |

| GK | 1 | Jeff Olver |
| RB | 2 | Wally Savor | Substituted off |
| CB | 15 | Charlie Yankos |
| CB | 21 | Robbie Dunn |
| LB | 3 | Graham Jennings |
| RM | 4 | Paul Wade |
| CM | 12 | Alan Davidson | (c) |
| CM | 6 | Frank Farina | Substituted off |
| LM | 19 | Oscar Crino |
| CF | 17 | Graham Arnold |
| CF | 10 | Scott Ollerenshaw |
Substitutions:
| MF | 5 | Vlado Bozinovski | | Substituted on |
| FW | 7 | Robbie Slater | | Substituted on |
Manager:
Frank Arok

| GK | 1 | Cláudio Taffarel |
| RB | 13 | Jorginho |
| CB | 3 | Aloisio |
| CB | 14 | Ricardo Gomes |
| LB | 6 | Nelsinho |
| RM | 8 | Andrade |
| CM | 5 | Valdo |
| LM | 10 | Geovani |
| RF | 7 | Müller |
| CF | 9 | Edmar | (c) | Substituted off |
| LF | 11 | Romario |
Substitutions:
| DF | 2 | Winck | Substituted on |
Manager:
Carlos Alberto Silva

== Awards ==
Australia Bicentenary Gold Cup

Brazil
First title

== Statistics ==
=== Goalscorers ===
There were 22 goals scored in 8 matches, for an average of 2.75 goals per match.

2 goals

- (Australia) Charlie Yankos
- (Australia) Frank Farina
- (Argentina) Hernán Díaz
- (Brazil) Romário
- (Brazil) Geovani
- (Saudi Arabia) Majed Abdullah

1 goal

- (Australia) Paul Wade
- (Australia) Vlado Bozinovski
- (Australia) Scott Ollerenshaw
- (Argentina) Oscar Ruggeri
- (Argentina) Diego Simeone
- (Argentina) Oscar Dertycia
- (Brazil) Luis Müller
- (Brazil) Jorginho
- (Brazil) Edmar

1 own goal

- (Argentina) Hernán Díaz (against Saudi Arabia)

== See also ==
- 1988 in Brazilian football
