= Abraham Watkins =

Fijian footballer (born 1960)

Personal information
- Date of birth: 31 May 1960 (age 66)
- Position: Defender

Senior career*
| Years | Team | Apps | (Gls) |
| 1977–1992 | Nadroga FA | | |

International career
| 1979–1992 | Fiji | 27 | (3) |
- * Club domestic league appearances and goals

Abraham Watkins (born 31 May 1960) is a Fijian former footballer who played as a defender. He made 27 appearances for the Fiji national team, scoring three goals.

== International career ==
Watkins made 27 appearances for Fiji between 1979 and 1992, scoring three goals. His debut came during the 1979 South Pacific Games, in a 2–0 win against the Solomon Islands. His first goal also came against the Solomon Islands, in a 3–1 win during the 1988 Melanesia Cup final.

He was notably part of the Fiji team that beat Australia 1–0 during 1990 FIFA World Cup qualification, with his performance that match helping him win Fijian Sportsman of the Year.

== Personal life ==
Watkins has two sons, one of whom, Archie, is also an international footballer for Fiji.

== Career statistics ==
Scores and results list Fiji's goal tally first, score column indicates score after each Madigi goal.

List of international goals scored by Ravuama Madigi
| No. | Date | Venue | Opponent | Score | Result | Competition |
|---|---|---|---|---|---|---|
| 1 | 26 October 1988 | Lawson Tama Stadium, Honiara, Solomon Islands | Solomon Islands | ? | 3–1 | 1988 Melanesia Cup |
| 2 | 10 September 1991 | Sir Ignatius Kilage Stadium, Lae, Papua New Guinea | New Caledonia | 3–1 | 3–1 | 1991 South Pacific Games |
| 3 | 28 July 1992 | Korman Stadium, Port Vila, Vanuatu | New Caledonia | 1–0 | 2–2 | 1992 Melanesia Cup |

== Honours ==
Nadroga

- Fiji Premier League: 1989, 1990
- Inter-District Championship: 1988, 1989

Fiji

- Melanesia Cup: 1988, 1992
- South Pacific Games gold medalist: 1991

Individual

- Fijian Sportsman of the Year: 1988
