= Kevin Harr =

South Korean footballer (born 2000)

Personal information
- Full name: Kevin Sören Harr
- Date of birth: 26 February 2000 (age 26)
- Place of birth: Nagold, Germany
- Height: 1.88 m (6 ft 2 in)
- Position: Goalkeeper

Team information
- Current team: Flagler Saints
- Number: 1

Youth career
- 2011: VfL Nagold
- 2011–2017: VfB Stuttgart
- 2017–2019: Hamburger SV

College career
| Years | Team | Apps | (Gls) |
| 2022–2023 | FIU Panthers | | |
| 2023– | Flagler Saints | | |
| 2024 | Hawaii Pacific University | | |

Senior career*
| Years | Team | Apps | (Gls) |
| 2019–2020 | Hamburger SV | 0 | (0) |
| 2019–2020 | Hamburger SV II | 12 | (0) |
| 2020–2021 | Erzgebirge Aue | 34 | (0) |
| 2022 | Rot Weiss Ahlen | 10 | (0) |

International career^{‡}
| 2017–2019 | South Korea U20 | 4 | (0) |
Medal record
Men's football
Representing South Korea
FIFA U-20 World Cup
| Runner-up | 2019 Poland |
AFC U-19 Championship
| Runner-up | 2018 Indonesia |
- * Club domestic league appearances and goals as of 8 February 2026 ‡ National team caps and goals as of 19 October 2019

Kevin Sören Harr (born 26 February 2000), known as Choi Min-soo (Korean: 최민수; Hanja: 崔民秀), is a professional footballer who plays as a goalkeeper for Flagler Saints. Born in Germany, he represents South Korea at international level.

== Club career ==
Choi Min-soo began his career with VfB Stuttgart's youth team and was a highly promising prospect in Germany, having been called up to the German youth national team. However, during the 2016-17 season, he made only five appearances in the U17 Bundesliga, conceding 11 goals. He was even left off the substitute list for six league matches. That season, he was called up to the U19 Bundesliga squad only once, and even then, he did not get a chance to play.

In May 2017, he transferred from VfB Stuttgart to Hamburger SV on a two-year youth contract with one year in the reserves, joining their U-19 youth team.

In 2024, he played for the Hawaii Pacific University soccer team, but for some reason, he is not on the roster for 2025.

== International career ==
In March 2017, during the Adidas Cup, a four-nation invitational tournament held domestically, goalkeeper Lee Jun of the U-20 national team was selected as a replacement after suffering a broken nose during a match and withdrawing, marking his first call-up to the South Korean national team. On March 30th, during the Adidas Cup match against Ecuador, he entered the game in the second half as a substitute for Ahn Jun-su with the team trailing 2-0. He kept a clean sheet for the remainder of the match. Although Lee Jun recovered from his injury, he did not make the final roster for the 2017 FIFA U-20 World Cup held in May of the same year.

He was named to the squad for the AFC U-19 Championship held in October 2018. Starting as goalkeeper in the group stage opener against Australia on October 19, he performed well until committing a pass error just before the final whistle, conceding the equalizing goal.

He was also selected for the South Korea U20 participating in the 2019 FIFA U-20 World Cup. However, Lee Gwang-yeon was the starting goalkeeper during the tournament, and Choi Min-soo did not see any playing time.

== Honours ==
South Korea U20

- FIFA U-20 World Cup runner-up: 2019
- AFC U-19 Championship runner-up: 2018
