= 1990 FIFA World Cup qualification (CONMEBOL–OFC play-off) =

- Event: 1990 FIFA World Cup qualification
Colombia	Israel
(Colombia)	(Israel)
1	0
- Colombia won 1–0 on aggregate

First leg
Colombia	Israel
1	0
- Date: 15 October 1989
- Venue: Estadio Metropolitano Roberto Meléndez, Barranquilla, Colombia
- Referee: Michel Vautrot (France)
- Attendance: 65,000

Second leg
Israel	Colombia
0	0
- Date: 30 October 1989
- Venue: Ramat Gan Stadium, Ramat Gan, Israel
- Referee: Edgardo Codesal (Mexico)
- Attendance: 50,000

The 1990 FIFA World Cup CONMEBOL–OFC qualification play-off was an association football match played over two-legs between Israel and Colombia. The first leg was played at the Estadio Metropolitano Roberto Meléndez in Barranquilla, Colombia on the 15 October 1989; the second leg being played at the Ramat Gan Stadium in Tel Aviv District, Israel on the 30 October 1989.

Both teams had to compete in regional qualifiers to make it to the play-off. The play-off was played as a home-and-away tie between the winners of the Oceania qualifying tournament, Israel, and the third-best team from the South American (CONMEBOL) qualifying tournament, Colombia. The games were played on 15 and 29 October 1989 in Barranquilla and Ramat Gan respectively. The last time Israel made the finals was Mexico 1970, Colombia was Chile 1962. After winning 3–1 on points (1–0 on aggregate), Colombia qualified for the World Cup.

== Venues ==
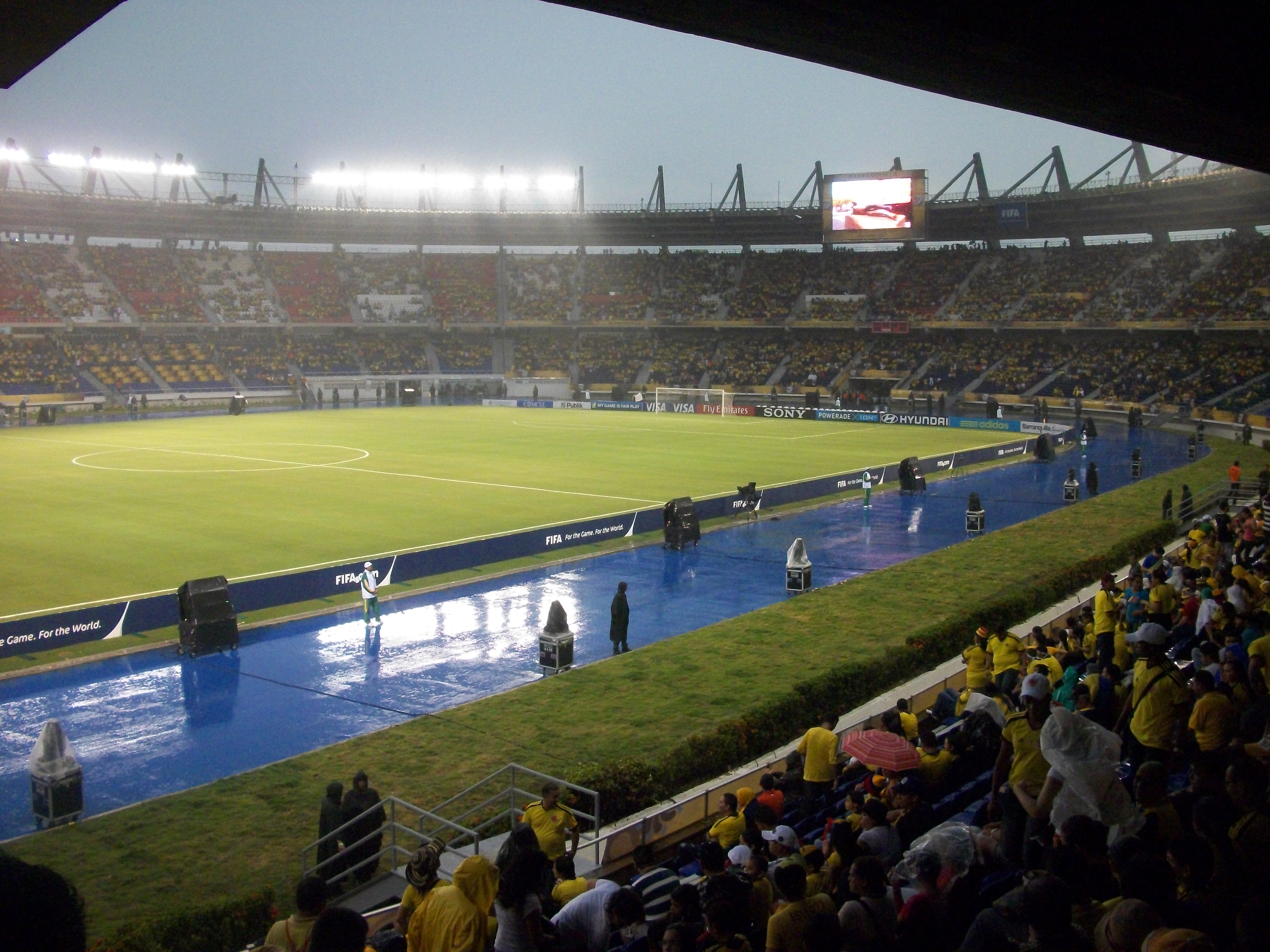
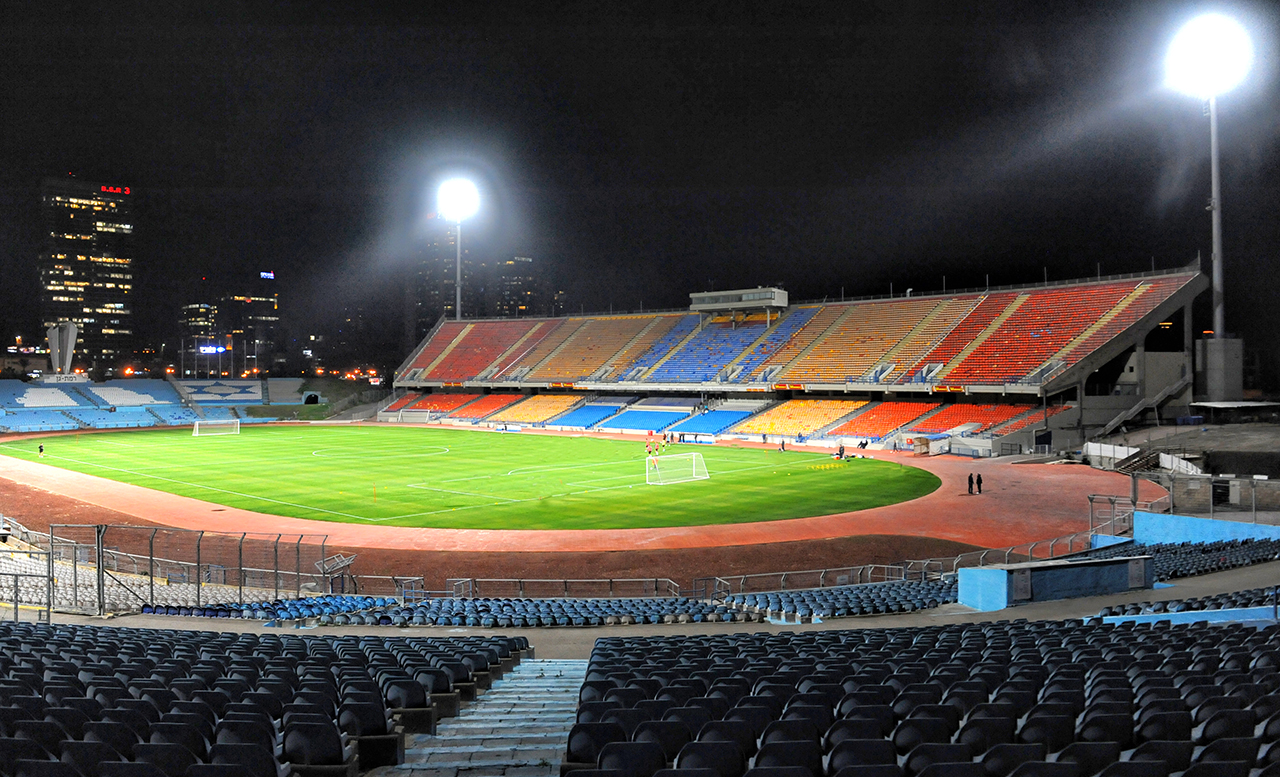
Estadio Roberto Meléndez (left) and Ramat Gan Stadium, venues for the series

== Background ==
Colombia

Team	Pld	W	D	L	GF	GA	GD	Pts
Colombia	4	2	1	1	5	3	+2	5
Paraguay	4	2	0	2	6	7	−1	4
Ecuador	4	1	1	2	4	5	−1	3

Round
Final standing
Israel

Team	Pld	W	D	L	GF	GA	GD	Pts
Israel	4	1	3	0	5	4	+1	5
Australia	4	1	2	1	6	5	+1	4
New Zealand	4	1	1	2	5	7	−2	3

== Play-off match ==
=== First leg ===
15 October 1989
15:30 UTC–5
First leg

Colombia	1–0	Israel
Usuriaga 73'	Report

Estadio Metropolitano Roberto Meléndez, Barranquilla
Attendance: 65,000
Referee: Michel Vautrot (France)

Colombia
Israel

GK	1	René Higuita
DF	4	Wilson Pérez
DF	15	Luis Carlos Perea
DF	2	Andrés Escobar
DF	5	León Villa
MF	10	Bernardo Redín	(substituted off) 46'
MF	14	Leonel Álvarez
MF	12	Carlos Valderrama
FW	17	Luis Fajardo
FW	16	Arnoldo Iguarán
FW	11	Rubén Hernández
Substitutes:
FW	7	Albeiro Usuriaga	(substituted on) 46'
Manager:
(Colombia) Francisco Maturana

GK	1	Boni Ginzburg
DF	2	Avi Cohen II
DF	3	Nissim Barda
DF	4	Nir Alon
DF	5	Yehuda Amar
MF	6	Efraim Davidi
MF	7	Nir Klinger
MF	8	Moshe Sinai
MF	9	Shalom Tikva	(substituted off) 62'
FW	10	Eli Ohana	(substituted off) 77'
FW	11	Roni Rosenthal
Substitutes:
FW	14	David Pizanti	(substituted on) 62'
FW	15	Nir Levine	(substituted on) 77'
Manager:
(Israel) Itzhak Schneor

=== Second leg ===
30 October 1989
19:00 UTC+2
Second leg

Israel	0–0	Colombia

Ramat Gan Stadium, Ramat Gan
Attendance: 50,000
Referee: Edgardo Codesal (Mexico)

== See also ==
- 1990 FIFA World Cup qualification (OFC)
