= Ravuama Madigi =

Fijian footballer (born 1965)

Personal information
- Date of birth: 19 August 1965 (age 61)
- Place of birth: Nausori, Colony of Fiji
- Position: Forward

Youth career
- –1985: Ba FA

Senior career*
Years	Team	Apps	(Gls)
1985–1993	Ba FA		(8+)
1994–2001	Rewa FC		

International career
1985	Fiji U19		
1986–1997	Fiji	14	(6)
- * Club domestic league appearances and goals

Ravuama Madigi (born 19 August 1965) is a Fijian former footballer who played as a forward. He made 14 appearances for the Fiji national team, scoring six goals.

== Club career ==
Madigi broke into Ba's first team in 1985, and made his debut that year. In 1986, he scored the winning goal in the Inter-District Championship against Nadroga FA. In 1993, Madigi was suspended sine die from Ba for his role in a shoplifting spree during Fiji's tour of New Zealand in May.

During his career, he was nicknamed "lethal Madigi" by commentators, thanks to his dangerous left foot.

== International career ==
At youth level, Madigi played for Fiji's under-19 team in 1985, during the team's tour of Australia.

In total, Madigi made 14 appearances for the Fiji national team between 1986 and 1997. His debut came on 17 September 1986, when he came on as a substitute in a 4–2 friendly loss against New Zealand at Churchill Park. His first international goal came in November 1988, during Fiji's 1–0 win against Australia during the first round of 1990 FIFA World Cup qualification.

== Personal life ==
Growing up, Ravuama had three brothers, including former Fijian international footballers Inia Bola and Kini Mocelutu. His son, Marika Madigi, is also a footballer who played for Ba and Lautoka.

== Career statistics ==
Scores and results list Fiji's goal tally first, score column indicates score after each Madigi goal.

List of international goals scored by Ravuama Madigi
No.	Date	Venue	Opponent	Score	Result	Competition
1	26 November 1988	Prince Charles Park, Nadi, Fiji	Australia	1–0	1–0	1990 FIFA World Cup qualification
2	12 September 1991	Sir Ignatius Kilage Stadium, Lae, Papua New Guinea	Guam	?	14–1	1991 South Pacific Games
3	12 September 1991	Sir Ignatius Kilage Stadium, Lae, Papua New Guinea	Guam	?	14–1	1991 South Pacific Games
4	12 September 1991	Sir Ignatius Kilage Stadium, Lae, Papua New Guinea	Guam	?	14–1	1991 South Pacific Games
5	14 September 1991	Sir Ignatius Kilage Stadium, Lae, Papua New Guinea	Tahiti	?	3–0	1991 South Pacific Games
6	28 July 1992	Korman Stadium, Port Vila, Vanuatu	New Caledonia	2–2	2–2	1992 Melanesia Cup

== Honours ==
Ba

- Fiji Premier League: 1986, 1987, 1992
- Fiji FA Cup Tournament: 1991
- Inter-District Championship: 1986, 1991
- Battle of the Giants: 1990, 1992, 1993
- Champion versus Champion: 1992

Rewa

- Inter-District Championship: 2001

Fiji

- South Pacific Games: 1991
- Melanesia Cup: 1992
