= Pita Dau =

Fijian footballer and rugby union player

Personal information
- Date of birth: 18 May 1963
- Place of birth: Naitasiri, Colony of Fiji
- Date of death: 30 March 2018 (aged 54)
- Place of death: Lautoka, Fiji
- Positions: Midfielder; defender

Youth career
- Service Football Club

Senior career*
| Years | Team | Apps | (Gls) |
| 1982–1995 | Lautoka | | |

International career
| 1988 | Fiji | 6 | (0) |
Rugby union career
- Position: Fly-half
International career
| Years | Team | Apps | (Points) |
| 1989–1993 | Fiji | 4 | |
- * Club domestic league appearances and goals

Pita Dau (18 May 1963 – 30 March 2018) was a Fijian footballer and rugby union player. He was notably a dual international, representing Fiji in both sports at the same time, being one of only a few athletes to do so.

== Association football career ==
Dau played football as both a midfielder and defender. He started his career at Service Football Club, before joining Lautoka, where he spent his entire career between 1982 and 1995.

In 1988, Dau played six matches for the Fiji national football team, and was the national team captain when they won the 1988 Melanesia Cup and beat Australia 1-0 in 1990 FIFA World Cup qualifying.

== Rugby union career ==
While at Lautoka, Dau also played rugby union as a fly-half. Between 1989 and 1993, Dau represented the Fiji national rugby union team, and was notably part of Fiji's team that beat a touring Queensland side, where he was sent off for a spear tackle on Australian Michael Lynagh.

== Personal life and death ==
Dau was the cousin of former rugby league footballer Mesake Navugona, who represented Fiji at the 2000 Rugby League World Cup. According to former Fiji national rugby sevens trainer Isireli Bulicokoboko, Dau was also a keen volleyball player.

Dau died on 30 March 2018, at the age of 54, following a heart attack.
