= Archie Watkins =

Fijian footballer

Personal information
- Date of birth: 15 September 1989 (age 37)
- Position: Defender

Team information
- Current team: Suva

Senior career*
Years	Team	Apps	(Gls)
2008–2009	Nadroga		
2010	Rewa		
2011–	Suva		

International career^{‡}
2011	Fiji	3	(0)
- * Club domestic league appearances and goals as of 14:56, 23 January 2019 (UTC) ‡ National team caps and goals as of 14:56, 23 January 2019 (UTC)

Archie Watkins (born 15 September 1989) is a Fijian international footballer who plays for Suva, as a defender.

== Career ==
Watkins has played for Nadroga, Rewa and Suva.

He earned 3 caps for the Fijian national team in 2011.

== Personal life ==
He is the son of former Fijian international footballer Abraham Watkins.
