= Nissim Barda =

Israeli footballer

Personal information
- Full name: Nissim Barda
- Date of birth: April 24, 1956 (age 70)
- Place of birth: Ramat Gan, Israel

Senior career*
Years	Team	Apps	(Gls)
1976–1982	Maccabi Ramat Amidar		
1982–1985	Maccabi Petah Tikva		
1985–1986	Maccabi Netanya		
1986–1990	Shimshon Tel Aviv		

International career
1983–1990	Israel	18	(0)
- * Club domestic league appearances and goals

Nissim Barda (Hebrew: ניסים ברדה) is a former Israeli footballer.
