= Nir Alon =

Israeli artist

- ניר אלון
- Born: Israel
- Education: Bezalel Academy of Art and Design, Jerusalem (1988–1992)
- Occupation(s): Sculptor, Installation artist
- Known for: Sculptures and installations using everyday objects
- Awards: Israeli Ministry of Education and Culture Young Artists Prize (1996)

Nir Alon (Hebrew: ניר אלון) is an Israeli sculptor and an installation artist based in Hamburg.

Alon studied from 1988 until 1992 at the Bezalel Academy of Art and Design in Jerusalem. In 1996 he received the prize for young artists of the Israeli Ministry for education and Culture. In 1998 he participated in an exchange exhibition in Hamburg. In 2001 he received a working scholarship as a guest artist to Harburg. Since then he works and lives in Hamburg. He had solo exhibitions in Jerusalem, Tel Aviv, Schwerin, Bonn, Mannheim, Frankfurt and Hamburg. He preferably develops his sculptures from cast-off everyday life articles such as furniture, suit-cases, lamps, light bulbs and cables, whereby the installations are arranged directly at the place of exhibition and in the reference to these. Thus it obtains an urgent effect with most economical means.

His works are in public and private collections in Germany, Israel, Italy and United States.

== Selected exhibitions/installations ==
- Cultural tracks-Trivial traps, Bezalel Academy, Jerusalem, 1993
- Very delicate foundations, Kidmat-Eden-Gallery, Tel Aviv, 1994
- Correct posture, Gross-Gallery, Tel Aviv, 1996
- Game of suppositions and refutations, Nahshon Gallery, Nahshon, 1996
- Sample of pervert imitation, Chelouche Gallery, Tel Aviv, 1997
- Installation, Schleswig-Holstein-Haus, Schwerin, 2001
- Operant Conditioning (Show), Kunstverein Harburger Bahnhof, Hamburg, 2002
- A state of being present, Installation, Hamburg, 2003
- Tell me about love, Installation, Kunsttreppe, Hamburg, 2004
- Ostentatiously stagger (guest), Atelierhaus Bonn, 2004
- Ein Tag, ein Raum, ein Bild - Special show, Sebastian Fath Contemporary, Mannheim, 2004
- Tell me about love (part II), Installation, Westwerk, Hamburg, 2004, (download catalogue 1.5 MB)
- An installation kit for a wanderer artist (Guest), Hamburg, 2004
- A funny game (Melancholy), Kampnagel Hamburg, 2005
- In case of leftovers, Sebastian Fath Contemporary, Mannheim, 2005
- This way or another – Kunstverein Buchholz.
- Etwas Grosses wird geschehen, Appel Gallery, Frankfurt, 2006
- Zeichnungen nach Installation, Magnus P. Gerdsen Gallery, Hamburg, 2006
- Now You Have A Problem Mister, MARKING SPACE. HAMBURG. JERUSALEM., Galerie ChezLinda, Hamburg, 2007
- active constellation, works from the collections of Reinking and Lafrenz – The House of Art, Brno, Czech Republic, 2007.

== Bibliography ==
- Rik Reinking, Eva Martens, Petra Nietzky, Hajo Schiff, Robin Hemmer, Thomas Schönberger, Anne Vieth, Sculpture@CityNord: Das temporäre Skulpturenprojekt 2006, Modo, Freiburg, 2007. ISBN 9783937014531
- Nir Alon, Anke Feuchtenberger, Stefano Ricci, Ich/I/Je/Io, Mami Verlag, Hamburg, 2008.
- Michele Robecchi, The Ground on Which I Stand: Nir Alon & Gazmend Ejupi, STP Books, London, 2019. ISBN 9781527226043
