= Alan Davidson (Australian soccer) =

Australian soccer player (born 1960)

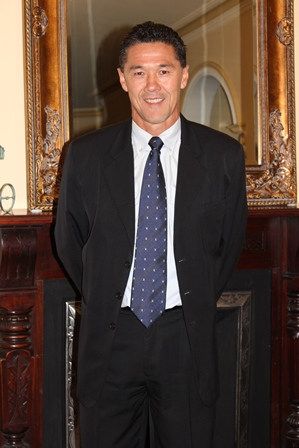
- Davidson in 2015

Personal information
- Full name: Alan Edward Davidson
- Date of birth: 1 June 1960 (age 66)
- Place of birth: Altona North, Melbourne, Australia
- Positions: Sweeper; full-back; midfielder

Youth career
- Altona City SC

Senior career*
Years	Team	Apps	(Gls)
1976–1977	Altona City SC	36	
1978–1984	South Melbourne	142	(10)
1984–1985	Nottingham Forest	3	(0)
1986	South Melbourne	13	(3)
1987–1992	Melbourne Croatia	133	(8)
1994	South Melbourne	8	(0)
1992–1996	Pahang FA	110	
1995	South Melbourne	7	(0)
1996–1997	Collingwood Warriors	10	(0)
1997–1998	Melbourne Knights	13	(0)
Total		439	(21)

International career^{‡}
1979	Australia U-20	10	
1980–1991	Australia	51	(2)
1988	Australian Olympic Team	4	
1989	Australia (futsal)	3	

Managerial career
- 1999: Pahang FA
- 2000: Whittlesea Zebras
- * Club domestic league appearances and goals as of 20 August 2007 ‡ National team caps and goals as of 20 August 2007

Alan Edward Davidson (born 1 June 1960) is an Australian former association football player who played as a defender or midfielder. He represented the Australia national team, earning over 50 caps, and played club football for teams including South Melbourne and Melbourne Croatia in the National Soccer League. Davidson also had a successful stint in Malaysia, playing for Pahang FA, where he won multiple domestic titles. Known for his strong tackling and leadership, he was a key figure in Australian soccer during the 1980s and early 1990s.

== Club career ==
Davidson made his senior debut in the Victorian State League in 1976 at the age of 15 playing for Altona City SC which had been his junior club. He transferred to South Melbourne in 1978, where he played until the end of the 1984 season, making 155 appearances and scoring 13 goals.

He moved to England for the 1984–85 season for Nottingham Forest F.C. and a promising start where he broke into the first team as a right-back was curtailed by illness after suffering a blow to the head and having a seizure during a reserve game on a very cold night which side lined him till the end of the season. He resumed training and played for the first team before suffering a serious back injury which sidelined him for over a year, forcing him into early retirement at the age of 25. He returned home to Melbourne.

He resumed playing in Australia at the end of 1986 for South Melbourne and in 1987 transferred to Melbourne Croatia, making 133 appearances and scoring 10 goals from 1987 to the end of the 1991–92 season and transferred to M-League club Pahang FA in Malaysia during 1992 where he was voted the League's best player, guiding the team to the M-League Championship and Malaysia Cup double. He was the only foreign player ever to be honored and received an AMP awarded by the Sultan of Pahang in 1996.

During 1989 Davidson led the Australia National Futsal Team to the first ever FIFA Futsal World Cup in the Netherlands where he played in all three round one games against Zimbabwe, Italy and United States. Brazil were crowned FIFA Futsal World Champions beating the Netherlands 2–1 in the final.

Near the end of his playing career, he guested for South Melbourne FC for two seasons (1994 and 1995), while with the Malaysian club Pahang FA between (1992 and 1996). His penultimate season (1996–97) he guested with the Collingwood Warriors, and his last season (1997–98) was back with the Melbourne Knights.

He finally retired in 1998 at the age of 38 after three World Cup campaigns, one 1989 FIFA Futsal World Cup and an Olympic Games: 1988 Seoul Olympics, 79 Socceroo appearances, 51 FIFA full A internationals and was number #32 official Socceroo Captain and Socceroo Cap No-292. He was inducted to the Football Federation Australia Football Hall of Fame – in the Hall of Champions category – in 2001.

Davidson was appointed the head coach of his former team Pahang in January 1999, however he parted ways with Pahang in April the same year.

In 2006 Former 1974 Socceroo World Cup Coach Rale Rasic named Davidson in his greatest ever Socceroo team.

Davidson also sits on Football Federation Australia A-Leagues Independent Match Review Panel and is one of two of the original three founding members of the current Match Review Panel formed in 2008–09 A-League season.

Davidson's footballing career was honoured on 12 July 2012 at the "Australia's Greatest Ever Footballers Gala" ceremony at the Sydney Convention Center being named in Australia's Best 11 ever "Socceroo Team" of all time. The team selected was – Mark Schwarzer, Lucas Neil, Joe Marston, Craig Moore, Alan Davidson, Johnny Warren, Ned Zelic, Tim Cahill, Ray Baartz, Mark Viduka and Harry Kewell.

Alan has been an honorary playing member of Victoria Police Soccer Club (VPSC) for a number of years (his father was a Victoria Police member), representing the Club at a number of local and National events. In June, 2013, Alan was honoured by accepting the title of Community Patron of VPSC. Alan travelled with VPSC in July, 2013, to Hong Kong, playing for VPSC in a tournament with the Hong Kong Police Force, Hong Kong Celebrity All Stars and Victoria Asian Football Federation. VPSC went through the tournament unbeaten to win the title.

Davidson was honoured by Football Federation Victoria at the Grand Hyatt Melbourne on 14 October 2013 in recognition of outstanding contribution to football in the state of Victoria and inducted to the FFV Hall of Fame.

On Tuesday 17 December 2013, Davidson was again honoured by Football Federation Australia and selected in the FFA Team of the Decade between 1980 – 1989 at The Crown Towers in Melbourne. The FFA Team of the Decade for the 1980s Terry Greedy, Alan Davidson, Tony Henderson, Charlie Yankos, Graham Jennings, Joe Watson, Murray Barnes, Oscar Crino, Zarko Odzakov, John Kosmina, Eddie Krncevic.

Wednesday 19 March 2014, Davidson was again honoured by Football Federation Victoria by Awarding him a Life Member of FFV in recognition of his outstanding meritorious service to football in Victoria.

== International career ==
His first Australian representative honours were in 1978–79 during the Under 19 World Youth Cup, qualifiers in New Zealand and Paraguay and made 10 youth appearances.

Davidson made his senior debut for Australia on 9 February 1980 at the age of 19 against Czechoslovakia in Melbourne drawing the game 2–2.

Davidson retired as Socceroos #32 official Socceroo Captain and Socceroo Cap No-292 after 79 international caps (51 in official FIFA matches) between 1980 and 1991 with the Australia team, scoring 2 goals in those appearances.

== Personal life ==
Davidson was born in Altona North, a suburb of Melbourne, in 1960 to Keith, an Australian, and Kazuko, who was born in Japan. His parents had met when his father was posted to Japan with the British Commonwealth Occupation Force.

His son Jason is also a professional football player, currently playing for the for Melbourne Victory and the Socceroos.

== Honours ==
South Melbourne

- NSL Championship: 1984
- NSL Cup: 1995–96
- Hellenic Cup: 1984

Nottingham Forest

- Saudi Arabia Cup: Winners 1984

Melbourne Knights

- NSL Championship Runners Up: 1990–91, 1991–92
- Ansett Challenge Shield: 1987
- Buffalo Cup: 1987

Pahang FA

- Malaysia Premier League: 1992, 1995
- Malaysia Cup: 1992: Runners Up 1994, 1995
- Malaysia Charity Shield: 1992, 1993 Runners Up 1995
- Malaysia FA Cup: Runners Up 1995

Collingwood Warriors

- NSL Cup: 1996–97

Australia

- OFC Nations Cup: 1980
- Trans-Tasman Cup: Winners 1988, Runners Up 1983, 1987
- Merlion Cup: Winners 1982, 1983
- President's Cup South Korea: Runners Up 1987
- Bicentennial Gold Cup 1988 Runners up

=== Individual ===
- Alan Davidson – Field 18 (Albert Park Lake) – 1996
- Ahli Mahkota Pahang Pahang: – 1996
- South Melbourne FC Team of the Century – 2000
- FFA Hall of Champions Inductee – 2001
- South Melbourne FC Hall of Champions: Inductee – 2002
- Greatest Ever Socceroos XI Team – 2012
- Football Federation Victoria Hall of Fame – 2013
- Football Federation Australia Team of the Decade 1980–89 – 2013
- Football Federation Victoria Life Member – 2014
