= Malcolm Dunford =

New Zealand footballer

Personal information
- Full name: Malcolm P Dunford
- Date of birth: 10 January 1963 (age 63)
- Place of birth: Wellington, New Zealand
- Position: Defender

Senior career*
Years	Team	Apps	(Gls)
1980–1984	Stop Out		
1990	Wellington Diamond United		
1990	Miramar Rangers		
1999–2023	Juventus Old Boys		

International career
1980–1993	New Zealand	41	(5)
- * Club domestic league appearances and goals

Malcolm Dunford (born 10 January 1963) is a former successful New Zealand association football player who frequently represented his country in the 1980s and 90s. A centre back, Dunford played with a number of central defenders including Bobby Almond, Ricki Herbert- stalwarts of New Zealand's successful 1982 World Cup campaign - and Ceri Evans.

Dunford captained his national team on numerous occasions and eventually retired his captaincy and national duties in 1993. He finished his playing career for the All Whites with 68 appearances, 41 of which were A-internationals in which he scored 5 goals.
