= Billy Wright (footballer, born 1962) =

Footballer (born 1962)

Personal information
- Full name: William Hardy Rogers Wright
- Date of birth: 4 November 1962 (age 63)
- Place of birth: Corbridge, England
- Position: Striker

Senior career*
Years	Team	Apps	(Gls)
1980–1983	Burnley	0	(0)
1982	→ Crewe Alexandra (loan)	3	(1)
1983–1984	Apollon Limassol		
1984–1985	Dundalk	?	(8)
1985–1988	Mount Wellington		
1989	Blacktown City Demons	2	(0)
1989	Morwell Falcons	23	(8)
1989–1990	West Adelaide	11	(3)
1990	Morwell Falcons	12	(9)
1990–1992	Miramar Rangers	12	(9)
1992–1993	Morwell Falcons	47	(18)
1994–1996	South Dandenong	75	(80)
1996–1998	Gippsland Falcons	13	(0)
1998–1999	South Dandenong	19	(8)
2000–2001	Cranbourne Comets	13	(10)
2002	Berwick City	22	(30)
2003	Noble Park	16	(15)

International career
1988–1993	New Zealand	15	(9)

Managerial career
- 1994: Newborough-Yallourn United
- 1995: Moe United
- 1998: South Dandenong
- * Club domestic league appearances and goals

Billy Wright (born 4 November 1962) is a former footballer who played as a striker. His senior career included stints with Burnley, Dundalk as well as National Soccer League clubs Blacktown City Demons, West Adelaide and Morwell Falcons. Born in England, he represented the New Zealand national team at international level.

== Club career ==
Wright was perhaps best known for his three separate stints with the Morwell Falcons - first joining the club in 1989, where he played a pivotal role in a dynamic partnership with Croatian striker Darko Basara. The pair combined for 19 league goals as the Falcons broke through for their second Victorian state championship in six years. He also hit a memorable hat-trick in just 24 minutes against Maribyrnong Polonia in the second round of the Dockerty Cup.

He then signed for West Adelaide - the very club who defeated Morwell for promotion to the National Soccer League in 1989.

He would rejoin Morwell in 1992 for their final season in the Victorian State League, scoring nine goals in 22 games, taking his record of State League goals to 26 in 57 games across three seasons with the Gippsland club.

The Falcons would then make their national debut in the National Soccer League in October 1992 and Wright played a pivotal role in their first season in the top flight, scoring nine goals in 25 games to finish equal top-scorer with Sasha Becvinovski.

He would come back to the Latrobe Valley in 1996 for a final season, although by then he was in his mid-30s and spent much of his time mentoring future Socceroos international Archie Thompson. Across three State League and two NSL seasons, Wright ended up with 95 games and 35 goals for the Falcons.

Despite playing as a sweeper in his final season with the Falcons, Wright would finish his career as a striker in the lower divisions of Victorian football and still remained particularly prolific into his late 30's.

== Managerial career ==
Wright's first foray into management was with Victorian Provisional League Division 2 club Newborough-Yallourn United, who he took over in 1994. After being relegated from Provisional League Division 1 the year before, the Combine were relegated again, going winless and garnering just two points in a miserable campaign.

Wright switched to crosstown rivals Moe United, who played in the Latrobe Valley Soccer League, taking over in 1995. Wright had better luck with the Red Devils, taking them to equal third.

He would then spend another year as a manager in 1998, this time with another of his old clubs, South Dandenong.

== International career ==
Wright made his full debut for New Zealand in a 2–0 win over Saudi Arabia on 21 June 1988 and ended his international playing career having played 26 times for the All Whites, including 15 A-internationals in which he scored 9 goals, his final official cap being in a 1–0 loss to Australia on 30 May 1993. Wright has since moved to coaching where he has found his calling combining his talent and love of the game with his tough play style.

=== International goals ===
No.	Date	Venue	Opponent	Score	Result	Competition
1.	23 June 1988	Melbourne, Australia	Saudi Arabia	2–0	3–2	Friendly
2.	11 December 1988	Wellington, New Zealand	Chinese Taipei	1–0	4–0	1990 FIFA World Cup qualification
3.	15 December 1988	Auckland, New Zealand	Chinese Taipei	1–0	4–1	1990 FIFA World Cup qualification
4.	2 April 1989	Auckland, New Zealand	Australia	2–0	2–0	1990 FIFA World Cup qualification
5.	9 April 1989	Auckland, New Zealand	Chinese Taipei	1–1	2–2	1990 FIFA World Cup qualification
6.	7 June 1992	Christchurch, New Zealand	Fiji	1–0	3–0	1994 FIFA World Cup qualification
7.	7 June 1992	Christchurch, New Zealand	Fiji	3–0	3–0	1994 FIFA World Cup qualification
8.	24 May 1993	Palmerston North, New Zealand	Fiji	?–0	5–0	Friendly
9.	24 May 1993	Palmerston North, New Zealand	Fiji	?–0	5–0	Friendly
