= Garry Lund =

New Zealand footballer

Personal information
- Full name: Garry Lund
- Place of birth: New Zealand

Senior career*
Years	Team	Apps	(Gls)
- Christchurch United

International career
1986–1993	New Zealand	15	(1)
- * Club domestic league appearances and goals

Garry Lund is an association football player who represented New Zealand.

Lund made his full All Whites debut in a 2–1 win over Fiji on 19 September 1986 and ended his international playing career with 15 A-international caps and 1 goal to his credit, his final cap earned in a 0–1 loss to Saudi Arabia on 24 April 1993.
