= Scott Ollerenshaw =

Australian soccer player

Personal information
- Full name: Scott Ollerenshaw
- Date of birth: 9 February 1968 (age 58)
- Place of birth: Sydney, Australia
- Height: 5 ft 10 in (1.78 m)
- Position: Forward

Senior career*
Years	Team	Apps	(Gls)
1986–1989	St George	93	(30)
1989–1991	Sydney Olympic	33	(3)
1991–1992	APIA Leichhardt	24	(3)
1992–1993	Walsall FC	20	(4)
1993	APIA Leichhardt	5	(0)
1993–1994	Wollongong City	2	(1)
1994–1997	Sabah	106	(110)
1998	Negeri Sembilan	?	(?)
1998–1999	Northern Spirit	0	(0)
1999	Ryde City Gunners	8	(4)
Total		50	(23)

International career
1987–1989	Australia	14	(2)

Managerial career
- 2021–: Sabah (Technical Director)
- * Club domestic league appearances and goals

Scott Ollerenshaw (born 9 February 1968) is an Australian former association football player, best known for his appearances for his country's national side in the late 1980s and as a successful import player in Malaysia especially with Sabah football team in the 1990s who scored against Manchester United on their 1995 Asian tour together with Sabah. In 2023, he officially become the Technical Director of Sabah football club.

== Club career ==
A prominent forward and winger, Scott Ollerenshaw played for several clubs including St George Saints and Sydney Olympic in Australia's National Soccer League before heading overseas. He had a season with Walsall FC in England before becoming a popular overseas player for Sabah FA in Malaysia's M-League. Scoring more than a goal a game in four seasons with Sabah FA, Ollerenshaw twice won the Malaysian Golden Boot and earned the nickname 'The Ginger Maradona'. After returning home to Australia to join National Soccer League club, Northern Spirit FC, a serious hip injury forced him to retire at the age of 31.

== Scoring against Manchester United ==
Ollerenshaw scored a famous goal against Manchester United on their Asian pre-season tour for the 1995-96 season. Although a Sabah player at the time, Ollerenshaw represented Selangor FA against a star-studded United side that included Eric Cantona and David Beckham. His left-footed strike beat Peter Schmeichel in the 4-1 defeat in front of 50,000 fans at Shah Alam Stadium on July 31, 1995 at the start of a season that saw the Red Devils win the Premier League title under Alex Ferguson.

== International career ==
As a 19-year-old, Ollerenshaw was capped in 1987 by his St George Saints manager Frank Arok who was also the national coach. Ollerenshaw played in the 1988 Gold Cup in Sydney, which marked the Australian Bicentenary and included a shock 4–1 victory over Argentina. Later that year, Ollerenshaw also played in the football tournament at the 1988 Summer Olympic Games in Seoul, South Korea.

== Post-playing career ==
He is married to Malaysia's former karate champion Michelle Koh. After retirement, Ollerenshaw has run his own sports tourism business in Kota Kinabalu of Sabah, specialising in organising junior and senior football tours and tournaments, including the annual Borneo Cup. Since 2021, he has been the technical and sporting director for his former club, Sabah. He has also helped football development in Malaysia through the recruitment of mixed heritage players from overseas to strengthen Malaysian clubs and the national team. These talented footballers, who have mostly been raised abroad with a Malaysian parent, include national team players Brendan Gan, Darren Lok, Junior Eldstål, Matthew Davies and Corbin-Ong. His overseas connections also helped the Malaysian U23 team compete in Queensland's NPL to aid with their development and at same time assisted Aussie national players and coaches showcasing their talents to clubs in Asia.

A familiar face in the Malaysian media, Ollerenshaw occasionally appeared as a Premier League and FIFA World Cup pundit especially on FourFourTwo of Malaysian sports television channel, Astro SuperSport between 2009 and 2014.
