= Charlie Yankos =

Australian soccer player

Charlie Yankos OAM
Personal information
- Full name: Charles Yankos
- Date of birth: 29 May 1961 (age 65)
- Place of birth: Melbourne, Australia
- Height: 1.86 m (6 ft 1 in)
- Position: Sweeper

Youth career
- 1978–1979: Heidelberg United

Senior career*
Years	Team	Apps	(Gls)
1979–1985	Heidelberg United	136	(6)
1986	West Adelaide		
1987–1988	APIA Leichhardt	44	(0)
1988–1989	PAOK	7	(0)
1989–1990	Blacktown City		
1990–1992	Wollongong City		
1992	Canterbury-Marrickville	15	(2)
1992–1994	Wollongong City		(7)

International career^{‡}
1983–1989	Australia	49	(7)
- * Club domestic league appearances and goals as of 12 February 2008 ‡ National team caps and goals as of 12 February 2008

Charles "Charlie" Yankos (born 29 May 1961) is an Australian former footballer who played for the Australian national team 49 times and scored 7 international goals. He captained the national team on 30 occasions between 1986 and 1989.

Charlie Yankos started his local football career with former NSL club Heidelberg United in 1979 and became one of the greatest players to wear the gold and black colors. He was also an important part of APIA Leichhardt's 1987 NSL title victory.

== International career ==
Charlie Yankos represented the Australian national team on 49 times including 13 world cup qualifiers, captaining the side on 30 occasions and scoring 7 international goals. He participated in the 1985 and 1989 World Cup qualifying campaigns, and also played in the Seoul Olympics in 1988 where Australia made the quarterfinals.

Yankos scored a long range goal from over 30 yards in the 1988 Australian Bicentennial Gold Cup against then-World Champions Argentina. In a 1990 FIFA World Cup qualification away match against Israel, he scored an equaliser for Australia, again with a long range free kick.

== After retirement ==
Following his retirement from football, Yankos moved into a successful career in business. He was inducted into the Football Australia Hall of Fame in 1999.

Charlie Yankos Street in the Sydney suburb of Glenwood is named for him.

== Career statistics ==
=== International ===
Appearances and goals by national team and year
National team	Year	Apps	Goals
Australia	1983	6	0
Australia	1984	1	0
Australia	1985	8	0
Australia	1986	6	0
Australia	1987	6	0
Australia	1988	17	5
Australia	1989	4	2
Total		48	7

Scores and results list Australia's goal tally first, score column indicates score after each Yankos goal.

List of international goals scored by Charlie Yankos
No.	Date	Venue	Opponent	Score	Result	Competition	Ref.
1	6 March 1988	Olympic Park Stadium, Melbourne, Australia	Israel	1–0	2–0	1988 Summer Olympics qualification	
2	14 July 1988	Sydney Football Stadium, Sydney, Australia	Argentina	2–1	4–1	Friendly	
3	14 July 1988	Sydney Football Stadium, Sydney, Australia	Argentina	3–1	4–1	Friendly	
4	3 December 1988	Macquarie Field, Lake Macquarie, Australia	Fiji	1–0	5–1	1990 FIFA World Cup qualification	
5	3 December 1988	Macquarie Field, Lake Macquarie, Australia	Fiji	3–0	5–1	1990 FIFA World Cup qualification	
6	12 March 1989	Sydney Football Stadium, Sydney, Australia	New Zealand	4–1	4–1	1990 FIFA World Cup qualification	
7	19 March 1989	Ramat Gan Stadium, Ramat Gan, Israel	Israel	1–1	1–1	1990 FIFA World Cup qualification	
