= Oscar Crino =

Australian soccer player (born 1962)

Personal information
- Date of birth: 9 August 1962 (age 64)
- Place of birth: Buenos Aires, Argentina
- Position: Midfielder

Senior career*
Years	Team	Apps	(Gls)
1981–1982	Tung Sing	7	(3)
1983–1985	South Melbourne	76	(18)
1985–1986	Anorthosis Famagusta		
1987–1989	Footscray JUST	53	(10)
1989–1991	Preston Makedonia	31	(7)

International career
1981	Australia U20		
1984	Australia B	2	(0)
1981–1989	Australia	37	(6)
- * Club domestic league appearances and goals

Oscar Crino (born 9 August 1962) is a former Australian international soccer player who played as a central midfielder for the Australian national side. He was an Australian Institute of Sport scholarship holder.

== Early life ==
Crino was born in 1962 in Buenos Aires, Argentina and arrived in Australia with his family in 1972.

== Club career ==
Crino played primarily in the National Soccer League with South Melbourne, Footscray JUST and Preston. He also played briefly in Cyprus with Anorthosis Famagusta and in Hong Kong with Tung Sing.

== International career ==
A regular player in the Australian team through the 1980s, Crino played 70 times for the national team, including 37 times in full international match for six goals.

== Coaching career ==
Crino is now coaching in Victorian State League 2NW with Cairnlea FC (www.cairnleafc.com.au).
