= King Charles Park =

Stadium in Nadi, Fiji

Coordinates: 17°48′8″S 177°25′15″E

King Charles Park, historically also known as Prince Charles Park, is a stadium in Nadi, Fiji. The stadium has a nominal capacity of 18,000 people.

It currently hosts rugby union matches, football (soccer) matches, and special events. The venue hosted the final of the football Oceania Club Championship in 1999.

The park is home to the Nadi Rugby Union and Nadi Football Association. Govind Park has also hosted many international matches with teams from all continents. It has also hosted local football tournaments like the Fiji Fact, Battle of the Giants, and Inter District Championship. The ground is managed by the Nadi Town Council. Plans are underway to expand the nominal capacity to 30,000, making it the largest stadium in the Fiji Islands.

In 1999, the Australia national football team played a friendly match with the Fiji national football team where the visitors won 2–1.
