= 1982 St George-Budapest FC season =

St George-Budapest
1982 season
- Head Coach: Frank Arok
- Stadium: St George Stadium
- National Soccer League: 2nd
- NSL Cup: First round
- Top goalscorer: League: Dez Marton (18); All: Dez Marton (19)
- Highest home attendance: 5,120 vs. Sydney City (8 August 1982); National Soccer League
- Lowest home attendance: 1,545 vs. Adelaide City (27 June 1982); National Soccer League
- Average home league attendance: 3,264
- Biggest win: 5–1 vs. Brisbane Lions (H) (11 July 1982); National Soccer League
- Biggest defeat: 0–4 vs. Sydney Olympic (A) (5 August 1982); National Soccer League
Home colours	Away colours

The 1982 season was the fifth in the National Soccer League for St George-Budapest Football Club (now St George). In addition to the domestic league, they also participated in the NSL Cup. St George-Budapest finished 2nd in their National Soccer League season, and were eliminated in the first round of the NSL Cup.

== Players ==
Note: Flags indicate national team as defined under FIFA eligibility rules; some limited exceptions apply. Players may hold more than one non-FIFA nationality.

No.	Pos.	Nation	Player
—	MF	AUS	Mark Barton
—	FW	AUS	Ernie Campbell
—	MF	AUS	John Davies
—	FW	AUS	Dennis Duarte
—	GK	AUS	Mike Fraser
—	GK	AUS	Terry Greedy
—	MF	AUS	Billy Griffith
—	FW	HUN	Lajos Koritar
—	FW	YUG	Laszlo Lerinc
—	FW	SCO	Ted MacDougall
—	FW	YUG	Dez Marton

No.	Pos.	Nation	Player
—	DF	AUS	John O'Shea
—	DF	AUS	Mike O'Shea
—	DF	AUS	Robbie O'Shea
—	DF	AUS	David Ratcliffe
—	DF	ENG	Dave Rylands
—	DF	AUS	David Skeen
—	MF	AUS	Robbie Slater
—	MF	AUS	Peter Stone
—	DF	AUS	Peter Terry
—	FW	ENG	Paul Wilkinson

== Competitions ==
=== Overall record ===
Competition	First match	Last match	Starting round	Final position	Record							
Competition	First match	Last match	Starting round	Final position	Pld	W	D	L	GF	GA	GD	Win %
National Soccer League	14 February 1982	5 September 1982	Matchday 1	2nd	30	14	8	8	47	40	+7	46.67
NSL Cup	14 June 1982		First round	First round	1	0	0	1	2	3	−1	0.00
Total					31	14	8	9	49	43	+6	45.16

Source: Competitions

=== National Soccer League ===
==== League table ====
Pos	Team	Pld	W	D	L	GF	GA	GD	Pts	Relegation
1	Sydney City (C)	30	20	5	5	68	28	+40	45	Qualification to Finals series (Note: The Finals series was not considered the championship for the 1982 National Soccer League.)
2	St George-Budapest	30	14	8	8	47	40	+7	36	Qualification to Finals series
3	Wollongong City	30	16	3	11	43	46	−3	35	Qualification to Finals series
4	Heidelberg United	30	13	8	9	42	37	+5	34	Qualification to Finals series
5	Preston Makedonia	30	12	10	8	45	41	+4	34	
6	South Melbourne	30	11	9	10	46	37	+9	31	
7	APIA Leichhardt	30	12	7	11	49	54	−5	31	
8	Sydney Olympic	30	12	6	12	52	42	+10	30	
9	West Adelaide	30	10	8	12	44	40	+4	28	
10	Marconi Fairfield	30	12	4	14	44	43	+1	28	
11	Brisbane Lions	30	10	8	12	39	42	−3	28	
12	Newcastle KB United	30	10	7	13	43	52	−9	27	
13	Adelaide City	30	6	12	12	36	44	−8	24	
14	Footscray JUST	30	5	14	11	34	46	−12	24	
15	Canberra City	30	7	10	13	37	54	−17	24	
16	Brisbane City	30	5	11	14	32	55	−23	21	

Source: rsssf.com
Rules for classification: 1) points; 2) goal difference; 3) number of goals scored.
(C) Champions

==== Results summary ====
Overall								Home						Away					
Pld	W	D	L	GF	GA	GD	Pts	W	D	L	GF	GA	GD	W	D	L	GF	GA	GD
30	14	8	8	47	40	+7	50	11	2	2	29	11	+18	3	6	6	18	29	−11

Source: worldfootball.net

==== Results by round ====
Round	1	2	3	4	5	6	7	8	9	10	11	12	13	14	15	16	17	18	19	20	21	22	23	24	25	26	27	28	29	30
Ground	A	H	A	H	H	A	H	A	H	A	H	A	H	A	H	A	H	A	H	H	A	H	A	H	A	H	A	H	A	A
Result	D	W	W	W	L	L	W	D	W	D	W	L	W	L	W	W	D	L	W	D	L	W	W	W	D	L	D	W	D	L
Position	5	5	4	3	4	8	6	6	3	4	3	4	3	4	4	3	2	4	2	2	2	2	2	2	2	2	2	2	2	2
Points	1	3	5	7	7	7	9	10	12	13	15	15	17	17	19	21	22	22	24	25	25	27	29	31	32	32	33	35	36	36

Source: worldfootball.net
A = Away; H = Home; W = Win; D = Draw; L = Loss

==== Matches ====
Win Draw Loss

14 February 1982 1	Footscray JUST	2–2	St George-Budapest	Melbourne
	Cozzella 66'; Hazabent 70'	Report		Stadium: Schintler Reserve; Attendance: 535; Referee: Chris Bambridge

21 February 1982 2	St George-Budapest	1–0	Canberra City	Sydney
	Barton 69'	Report		Stadium: St George Stadium; Attendance: 1,874; Referee: Gary Power

27 February 1982 3	Newcastle KB United	1–2	St George-Budapest	Newcastle
	Stamp 2'	Report	Barton 16'; Marton 56' (pen.)	Stadium: Newcastle International Sports Centre; Attendance: 3,050; Referee: Brian Fowler

6 March 1982 4	St George-Budapest	2–1	Heidelberg United	Sydney
	Marton 62'; Lerinc 66'	Report	Campbell 24'	Stadium: St George Stadium; Attendance: 3,454; Referee: Tony Boskovic

14 March 1982 5	St George-Budapest	1–2	Sydney Olympic	Sydney
	Marton 90'	Report	Koussas 34'; K. Wilson 84'	Stadium: St George Stadium; Attendance: 3,340; Referee: Ken Small

21 March 1982 6	Adelaide City	3–0	St George-Budapest	Adelaide
	Mitchell 45', 47'; Melta 70'	Report		Stadium: Hindmarsh Stadium; Attendance: 3,200; Referee: Bob Kerr

28 March 1982 7	St George-Budapest	2–0	Marconi Fairfield	Sydney
	Marton 62', 87'	Report		Stadium: St George Stadium; Attendance: 2,892; Referee: Tony Boskovic

3 April 1982 8	Brisbane Lions	1–1	St George-Budapest	Brisbane
	Daunt 90+2'	Report	Barton 13'	Stadium: Richlands Stadium; Attendance: 1,100; Referee: Bill Monteverde

11 April 1982 9	St George-Budapest	2–0	Preston Makedonia	Sydney
	Barton 4'; O'Shea 75'	Report		Stadium: St George Stadium; Attendance: 3,258; Referee: Gary Power

18 April 1982 10	Wollongong City	2–2	St George-Budapest	Wollongong
	Bertogna 13'; Gaffney 15'	Report	Stone 59'; Slater 75'	Stadium: Wollongong Showground; Attendance: 6,000; Referee: Tony Boskovic

25 April 1982 11	St George-Budapest	2–1	South Melbourne	Sydney
	Stone 44'; Slater 62'	Report	Egan 51'	Stadium: St George Stadium; Attendance: 3,789; Referee: Richard Lorenc

2 May 1982 12	Sydney City	3–1	St George-Budapest	Sydney
	Kosmina 2', 26' (pen.), 51'	Report	Duarte 76'	Stadium: ES Marks Athletics Field; Attendance: 2,781; Referee: Gary Power

9 May 1982 13	St George-Budapest	2–0	West Adelaide	Sydney
	Slater 48'; Marton 83'	Report		Stadium: St George Stadium; Attendance: 3,654; Referee: Tim Davies

16 May 1982 14	APIA Leichhardt	3–2	St George-Budapest	Sydney
	Soper 11'; Giampaolo 29' (pen.); Skeen 42' (o.g.)	Report	Slater 81', 90+2'	Stadium: Lambert Park; Attendance: 5,259; Referee: Peter Rampley

22 May 1982 15	St George-Budapest	1–0	Brisbane City	Sydney
	Marton 17'	Report		Stadium: St George Stadium; Attendance: 1,754; Referee: Richard Lorenc

30 May 1982 16	Canberra City	1–2	St George-Budapest	Canberra
	Maclaren 30'	Report	Barton 7'; Marton 81'	Stadium: Bruce Stadium; Attendance: 1,400; Referee: Ken Allen

6 June 1982 17	St George-Budapest	1–1	Footscray JUST	Sydney
	Marton 51' (pen.)	Report	Kondarios 87'	Stadium: St George Stadium; Attendance: 2,963; Referee: Jim Reeves

13 June 1982 18	Heidelberg United	3–1	St George-Budapest	Melbourne
	Cole 70'; Paton 77'; Bekiaris 84'	Report	Wilkinson 43'	Stadium: Olympic Village; Attendance: 2,800; Referee: Dennis Voutsinas

20 June 1982 19	St George-Budapest	3–0	Newcastle KB United	Sydney
	Marton 69', 84'; Wilkinson 89'	Report		Stadium: St George Stadium; Attendance: 4,435; Referee: Ken Small

27 June 1982 20	St George-Budapest	2–2	Adelaide City	Sydney
	Slater 28'; Marton 54'	Report	Duarte 6' (o.g.); Melta 81'	Stadium: St George Stadium; Attendance: 1,545; Referee: Peter Rampley

4 July 1982 21	Marconi Fairfield	3–1	St George-Budapest	Sydney
	Mariani 17'; Sharne 20'; Licata 74'	Report	Barton 80'	Stadium: Marconi Stadium; Attendance: 2,681; Referee: Richard Lorenc

11 July 1982 22	St George-Budapest	5–1	Brisbane Lions	Sydney
	Wilkinson 16'; R. O'Shea 18'; Marton 34', 42' (pen.); Barton 60'	Report	Ogden 43' (pen.)	Stadium: St George Stadium; Attendance: 2,434; Referee: Jim Reeves

18 July 1982 23	Preston Makedonia	0–1	St George-Budapest	Melbourne
		Report	Barton 84'	Stadium: B.T. Connor Reserve; Attendance: 1,000; Referee: Stewart Mellings

25 July 1982 24	St George-Budapest	2–1	Wollongong City	Sydney
	Slater 51'; Ratcliffe 80'	Report	Cotton 39'	Stadium: St George Stadium; Attendance: 4,123; Referee: Bob Mee

1 August 1982 25	South Melbourne	0–0	St George-Budapest	Melbourne
		Report		Stadium: Middle Park Soccer Stadium; Attendance: 3,000; Referee: Chris Bambridge

8 August 1982 26	St George-Budapest	0–1	Sydney City	Sydney
		Report	Barnes 13'	Stadium: St George Stadium; Attendance: 5,120; Referee: Tim Davies

15 August 1982 27	West Adelaide	1–1	St George-Budapest	Adelaide
	Dunn 12'	Report	Marton 65' (pen.)	Stadium: Hindmarsh Stadium; Attendance: 2,500; Referee: Chris Bambridge

22 August 1982 28	St George-Budapest	3–1	APIA Leichhardt	Sydney
	MacDougall 2'; Marton 34', 74'	Report	Jones 63'	Stadium: St George Stadium; Attendance: 4,320; Referee: Tony Boskovic

29 August 1982 29	Brisbane City	2–2	St George-Budapest	Brisbane
	Cairney 26', 87'	Report	MacDougall 8'; Slater 90+2'	Stadium: Spencer Park; Attendance: 1,200; Referee: Bob Mee

5 August 1982 30	Sydney Olympic	4–0	St George-Budapest	Sydney
	Redfern 28' (pen.), 35'; Koussas 67'; Katholos 88'	Report		Stadium: Pratten Park; Attendance: 5,547; Referee: Doug Rennie

==== Finals series ====
The Finals series was not considered the championship for the 1982 National Soccer League.

19 September 1982 Semi-finals	Sydney City	3–0	St George-Budapest	Sydney
	Mitchell 38'; Boden 75'; Watson 87'	Report		Stadium: St George Stadium; Attendance: 3,850; Referee: Don Campbell

26 September 1982 Preliminary Final	Wollongong City	0–2	St George-Budapest	Sydney
		Report	Wilkinson 51'; Marton 76'	Stadium: St George Stadium; Attendance: 3,850; Referee: Don Campbell

3 October 1982 Grand Final	Sydney City	1–3	St George-Budapest	Penrith
	Kosmina ?' (pen.)	Report	Marton 22', ?' (pen.), 83'	Stadium: Penrith Stadium; Attendance: 6,495; Referee: Tony Boskovic

=== NSL Cup ===
14 June 1982 First round	Canberra City	3–2	St George-Budapest	Canberra
	Gibson ?'; Stone 79'; Reis 90'	Report	Marton 52'; Slater 75'	Stadium: Bruce Stadium; Attendance: 1,800; Referee: Bob Mee

== Statistics ==
=== Appearances and goals ===
Includes all competitions. Players with no appearances not included in the list.

No.	Pos	Nat	Player	Total		National Soccer League		NSL Cup	
No.	Pos	Nat	Player	Apps	Goals	Apps	Goals	Apps	Goals
	MF	(Australia) AUS	Mark Barton	24	8	22+2	8	0	0
	FW	(Australia) AUS	Ernie Campbell	4	0	3+1	0	0	0
	MF	(Australia) AUS	John Davies	6	0	6	0	0	0
	FW	(Australia) AUS	Dennis Duarte	7	1	3+3	1	1	0
	GK	(Australia) AUS	Mike Fraser	30	0	30	0	0	0
	GK	(Australia) AUS	Terry Greedy	1	0	0	0	1	0
	MF	(Australia) AUS	Billy Griffith	11	0	6+4	0	1	0
	FW	(Hungary) HUN	Lajos Koritar	11	0	7+3	0	1	0
	FW	(Socialist Federal Republic of Yugoslavia) YUG	Laszlo Lerinc	5	1	1+4	1	0	0
	FW	(Scotland) SCO	Ted MacDougall	6	2	6	2	0	0
	FW	(Socialist Federal Republic of Yugoslavia) YUG	Dez Marton	30	19	27+2	18	1	1
	DF	(Australia) AUS	John O'Shea	25	1	23+2	1	0	0
	DF	(Australia) AUS	Mike O'Shea	28	0	28	0	0	0
	DF	(Australia) AUS	Robbie O'Shea	28	1	28	1	0	0
	DF	(Australia) AUS	David Ratcliffe	30	1	29	1	1	0
	DF	(England) ENG	Dave Rylands	2	0	1	0	1	0
	DF	(Australia) AUS	David Skeen	30	0	29	0	1	0
	MF	(Australia) AUS	Robbie Slater	24	9	21+2	8	1	1
	MF	(Australia) AUS	Peter Stone	31	2	30	2	1	0
	DF	(Australia) AUS	Peter Terry	4	0	2+1	0	1	0
	FW	(England) ENG	Paul Wilkinson	28	4	28	4	0	0

=== Disciplinary record ===
Includes all competitions. The list is sorted by squad number when total cards are equal. Players with no cards not included in the list.

No.	Pos	Nat	Player	Total			National Soccer League			NSL Cup		
No.	Pos	Nat	Player	Yellow card	Second yellow card	Red card	Yellow card	Second yellow card	Red card	Yellow card	Second yellow card	Red card
	DF	(Australia) AUS	Robbie O'Shea	4	0	1	4	0	1	0	0	0
	DF	(Australia) AUS	Mike O'Shea	3	0	0	3	0	0	0	0	0
	DF	(Australia) AUS	David Ratcliffe	3	0	0	3	0	0	0	0	0
	DF	(Australia) AUS	David Skeen	2	0	0	2	0	0	0	0	0
	MF	(Australia) AUS	John Davies	1	0	0	1	0	0	0	0	0
	FW	(Australia) AUS	Dennis Duarte	1	0	0	0	0	0	1	0	0
	MF	(Australia) AUS	Peter Stone	1	0	0	1	0	0	0	0	0
	DF	(Australia) AUS	Peter Terry	1	0	0	1	0	0	0	0	0
	FW	(England) ENG	Paul Wilkinson	1	0	0	1	0	0	0	0	0

- (yellow card) = Number of bookings; (second yellow card) = Number of sending offs after a second yellow card; (red card) = Number of sending offs by a direct red card.
