= Football Australia Hall of Fame =

Association football hall of fame

The aims of the Football Australia Hall of Fame (founded in 1999 as the Soccer Hall of Fame) are to celebrate and highlight the achievements of retired players and other participants who have contributed significantly to the game. These are made up of either Australian and/or non-Australian footballers, managers and other participants who have become significant figures in the history of the game in Australia. New members are generally added each year.

== Selection ==
All nominees must be Australian citizens. For non-players, inclusion is based on criteria including and "overall sustained contribution to the game".

== Awards ==
Originally, there were several categories based on the nature of an individual's contribution, including:

- Hall of Champions (players) / Hall of Honour (non-players)
- Medal of Excellence (players) / Roll of Honour (non-players)
- Award of Distinction (players) / Roll of Honour (non-players)

== 1999 Inaugural inductees ==
=== Players ===
- (Australia) George Smith
- (Australia) Cliff Sander
- (Australia) Graham McMillan
- (Australia) John Perin
- (Australia) Frank Parsons
- (Australia) Jeff Olver
- (Australia) Gordon Nunn
- (Australia) Sergio Melta
- (Australia) Gary Marocchi
- (Australia) Allan Johns
- (Australia) Tom Jack
- (Australia) William "Bill" Henderson
- (Australia) Jack Evans
- (Netherlands) Sjel "Mike" de Bruyckere
- (Australia) William Coolahan
- (Australia) Jim Armstrong
- (Australia) Ron Adair
- (Australia) John Watkiss
- (Australia) Ray Richards
- (Australia) Graham Jennings
- (Australia) Col Curran
- (Australia) Charlie Yankos
- (Australia) Connie Selby
- (Australia) Harry Williams
- (Australia) Manfred Schaefer
- (Australia) John Nyskohus
- (Australia) James McNabb
- (Australia) William Maunder
- (Australia) Jimmy Mackay
- (Australia) Frank Loughran
- (Australia) Bob Lawrie
- (Australia) Julie Dolan
- (Australia) Ray Baartz
- (Australia) Peter Wilson
- (Australia) Johnny Warren MBE
- (Australia) Jimmy Rooney
- (Australia) Alf Quill
- (Australia) James "Judy" Masters
- (Australia) Joe Marston MBE
- (Australia) Ron Lord
- (Australia) John Kosmina
- (Australia) Reg Date
- (Australia) Bob Bignell
- (Australia) Attila Abonyi

=== Participants ===
- (Australia) Ron Wright
- (Australia) Sir William Walkley
- (Hungary) Joe Vlasits
- (Australia) William Thomas
- (Australia) Ron Smith
- (Australia) Martin Royal
- (Australia) Peter Nikolich
- (Australia) Des Miles
- (Australia) Frank McIver
- (Australia) Zoran Matić
- (Australia) Jack Logan
- (Australia) Brian Lefevre
- (Australia) Tony Kovac OAM
- (Australia) Tom Grimson
- (Australia) Keith Gilmour
- (Australia) Pam Gilbert
- (Australia) Harry Croft
- (Australia) Donald Campbell
- (Australia) Fred Barlow
- (Australia) Eric Worthington
- (Australia) Laurie Schwab
- (Australia) Les Scheinflug
- (Australia) Julius Re
- (Australia) Sam Papasavas
- (Australia) Dieter Klose
- (Australia) Brian Corrigan
- (Australia) Ian Brusasco AM
- (Australia) Giacomo "Jim" Bayutti OA
- (Australia) Frank Arok
- (Australia) Michael Weinstein AM, BEM
- (Australia) Elaine Watson OAM
- (Australia) Vic Tuting MBE
- (Australia) Robert Telfer
- (Socialist Federal Republic of Yugoslavia) Rale Rasic
- (Australia) Theo Maramaris MBE
- (Australia) Arthur Gibbs
- (Australia) John Walter Fletcher
- (Australia) Harry Dockerty
- (Australia) Tony Boscovic
- (Australia) Sir Arthur George AO

== 2000 inductees ==
=== Players ===
- (Australia) Adrian Alston
- (Australia) Eddie Krncevic
- (Australia) Paul Wade
- (Australia) Oscar Crino
- (Australia) Doug Utjesenovic
- (Australia) Murray Barnes
- (Australia) Ron Corry
- (Australia) Alex Gibb
- (Australia) Kevin O'Neill
- (Australia) Joe Watson

=== Participants ===
- (Australia) Chris Bambridge
- (Australia) Don Sutherland
- (Australia) Charles Valentine
- (Australia) Barry Bainbridge
- (Australia) Jim Connell
- (Australia) Charles Perkins
- (Australia) Emmanuel Poulakakis
- (Australia) John Taylor

== 2001 inductees ==
=== Players ===
- (Australia) Bill Vojtek
- (Australia) Cecil Drummond
- (Australia) Alan Davidson
- (Australia) Frank Farina
- (Australia) Tony Henderson
- (Australia) Pat O'Connor
- (Australia) David Ratcliffe
- (Australia) Jim Tansey
- (Australia) Leo Baumgartner
- (Australia) Gary Byrne
- (Australia) Robert Dunn
- (Australia) Ken Murphy

=== Participants ===
- (Australia) John Constantine
- (Australia) Basil Scarsella
- (Australia) Charles Caruso
- (Australia) Doug Rennie
- (Australia) Bill Vrolyks
- (Australia) George Wallace
- (Australia) Les Broadbent
- (Australia) Sid Grant
- (Australia) Eric Heath
- (Australia) Bob McShane
- (Australia) Arthur Roberts
- (Australia) Bill Turner

== 2002 inductees ==
=== Players ===
- (Australia) James Wilkinson
- (Australia) Cindy Heydon
- (Australia) George Harris
- (Australia) Branko Buljevic
- (Australia) Stan Ackerley
- (Australia) Peter Ollerton
- (Australia) Joanne Millman
- (Australia) Norman Conquest

=== Participants ===
- (Australia) Fred Robins
- (Scotland) Eddie Thomson
- (Australia) George Vasilopoulos
- (Australia) Allan Crisp
- (Australia) John Fraser
- (Australia) Siri Kannangara
- (Australia) Dennis McDermott
- (Australia) Rodney Woods

== 2003 inductees ==
=== Players ===
- (Australia) Wally Savor
- (Australia) Percy Lennard
- (Australia) William "Bill" Henderson
- (Australia) Milan Ivanović
- (Australia) Colin Bennett
- (Australia) Gary Cole
- (Australia) Steve O'Connor
- (Australia) Roy Crowhurst
- (Australia) Theresa Deas
- (Australia) David Harding

=== Participants ===
- (Australia) Betty Hoar
- (Australia) Les Murray
- (Australia) Peter Gray
- (Australia) Ken Allen
- (Australia) Vito Cilauro
- (Australia) Denis Harlow
- (Australia) Joseph J Honeysett
- (Australia) Peter Van Ryn

== 2004 inductees ==
=== Players ===
- (Australia) Graham Arnold
- (Australia) Jack Hughes
- (Australia) Jack Reilly
- (Australia) Todd Clarke
- (Australia) Ian Gray
- (Australia) Sue Monteath

=== Participants ===
- (Australia) Peter Thorne
- (Australia) Jane Oakley
- (Australia) Roy Druery
- (Australia) Gordon Dunster
- (Australia) Fred Hutchinson

== 2005 inductees ==
=== Players ===
- (Australia) Mike Petersen
- (Australia) Robbie Slater
- (Australia) Allan Maher
- (Australia) Alec Cameron
- (Australia) Craig Johnston
- (Australia) Bruce Morrow

=== Participants ===
- (Australia) Roger Lamb
- (Australia) Vic Dalgleish
- (Australia) Harry Hetherington
- (Australia) Phil Murphy
- (Australia) Gary Wilkins

== 2006 inductees ==
=== Players ===
- (Australia) Dave Mitchell
- (Australia) Charlie Stewart
- (Australia) Peter Sharne
- (Australia) Ernie Campbell
- (Australia) Robert Zabica

=== Participants ===
- (Australia) Fred Villiers
- (Australia) Raul Blanco
- (Germany) André Krüger
- (Australia) Ray Sandell

== 2007 inductees ==
=== Players ===
- (Australia) Alex Tobin
- (Australia) Terry Greedy
- (Australia) Steve Blair
- (Australia) Anissa Tann

=== Participants ===
- (Australia) Eddie Lennie
- (Australia) Heather Reid
- (Australia) John Barclay
- (Australia) Ted Rowley
- (Australia) Trixie Tagg

== 2008 inductees ==
=== Players ===
- (Australia) Tracey Wheeler
- (Australia) George Keith
- (Australia) Cliff Almond
- (Australia) Julie Murray
- (Australia) Aurelio Vidmar

=== Participants ===
- (Australia) Mike Wells
- (Australia) George Dick OAM
- (Australia) Donato Di Fabrizio
- (Australia) John De Witt
- (Australia) Peter Desira
- (Australia) John Thomson

== 2009 inductees ==
=== Players ===
- (Australia) Tony Vidmar
- (Australia) Cheryl Salisbury
- (Australia) Paul Okon

=== Participants ===
- (Australia) John Economos
- (Australia) Sam Vella OA

== 2010 inductees ==
=== Players ===
- (Australia) Ned Zelic
- (Australia) Joanne Peters
- (Australia) Stan Lazaridis

=== Participants ===
- (Australia) Martyn Crook
- (Australia) Mark Shield

== 2011 inductees ==
=== Players ===
- (Australia) Craig Moore
- (Australia) Dianne Alagich

=== Participants ===
- (Australia) Ted Simmons
- (Australia) Mike Cockerill

== 2012 inductees ==
=== Players ===
- (Australia) Alison Forman
- (Australia) Scott Chipperfield

=== Participants ===
- (Australia) Alan Vessey

== 2013 inductees ==
=== Players ===
- (Australia) James "Jim" Fraser
- (Australia) Sunni Hughes

== 2014 inductees ==
=== Players ===
- (Australia) Sandra Brentnall
- (Australia) Damian Mori
- (Australia) Mark Viduka

=== Participants ===
- (Australia) Stefan Kamasz
- (Scotland) Tom Sermanni

== 2015 inductees ==
=== Players ===
- (Australia) Lisa Casagrande
- (Australia) John Kundereri Moriarty

== 2016 inductees ==
=== Players ===
- (Australia) Sacha Wainwright
- (Australia) Peter Raskopoulos

=== Participants ===
- (Australia) Tammy Ogston

== 2018 inductees ==
=== Players ===
- (Australia) Sonia Gegenhuber
- (Australia) Mark Bresciano

=== Participants ===
- (Australia) Andrew Dettre

== 2019 inductees ==
=== Players ===
- (Australia) Harry Kewell
- (Australia) Leigh Wardell

=== Participants ===
- (Australia) Branko Culina
- (Australia) Frank Lowy

== 2021 inductees ==
=== Players ===
- (Australia) Heather Garriock
- (Australia) Grace Gill
- (Australia) Mark Schwarzer OAM

=== Participants ===
- (Australia) Joseph H Honeysett

== 2022 inductees ==
=== Players ===
- (Australia) Moya Dodd
- (Australia) Collette McCallum
- (Australia) Ange Postecoglou
- (Australia) Ted Smith

=== Participants ===
- (Australia) Walter Pless
- (Australia) Brendan Schwab

== 2023 inductees ==
Did not happen.

== 2024 inductees ==
=== Players ===
- (Australia) Craig Foster

=== Participants ===
- (Australia) Jenny Bray
- (Australia) Ian Holmes
- (Australia) Alex Pongrass

== 2025 inductees ==
=== Players ===
- (Australia) Sharon Black
- (Australia) Tim Cahill

=== Participants ===
- (Scotland) Roy Hay (writer)

== See also ==
- Football Hall of Fame Western Australia
