= Alex Pongrass =

Australian football administrator

Alexander Pongrass AM
- Sándor Pongrácz
- Born: 10 November 1923; Nyíregyháza, Hungary
- Died: 9 June 2000 (aged 76); Sydney
- Occupations: Business executive, football administrator
- Known for: Co-founding the National Soccer League, Chairman of St George-Budapest CSC
- Awards: Member of the Order of Australia (1988); Football Australia Hall of Fame (2024)

Alexander Pongrass AM (10 November 1923 – 9 June 2000) was a Hungarian-born Australian businessman and football administrator. Co-founder of the National Soccer League (NSL) alongside Frank Lowy. Pongrass was a long-time chairman of St George-Budapest Soccer Club.

== Early life ==
Born into a Jewish family in 1923, he was the second of three brothers. He began a textile apprenticeship and studied bookkeeping.

In 1939, following the outbreak of World War II, 16-year-old Pongrass left home to work in his uncle’s newspaper distribution business. His parents later died in the Auschwitz concentration camp. His brother, George, survived internment in the Dachau concentration camp.

In 1944, during the German occupation of Hungary, Pongrass joined the Jewish underground resistance. Utilising forged identity papers, he posed as a liaison officer with the SS guards command. He successfully escorted Hungarian Jews to the protection of Raoul Wallenberg, the Swedish diplomat who saved thousands of Jews from execution and forced death marches by issuing protective Swedish passports.

== Business career ==
Partnering with his brother George, Alex established an engineering works in Sydney (later Pongrass Brothers Pty Ltd). During the 1960s and 70s, the company expanded into commercial boatbuilding, metal furniture, and plumbing, eventually employing over 600 people.

== Football administration ==
=== St George-Budapest ===
Pongrass served as a benefactor and chairman of the St George-Budapest Soccer Club. In 1958, he became president for over 40 years until the late 1990s. Under his leadership, the club became an powerhouse in Australian football, constructing its own rectangular venue, St George Stadium at Barton Park, which hosted local and international fixtures.

Pongrass is credited with elevating the professional standards of the sport in Australia by actively recruiting top-tier, professional coaching talent. He hired national team manager Rale Rasic and Hungarian-Australian coach Frank Arok. During his tenure, St George-Budapest won five NSW First Division championships and captured the National Soccer League title in 1983. Pongrass also acted as a long-time mentor to Australian football legend Johnny Warren.

=== Foundation of the National Soccer League ===
On 5 April 1975, Pongrass and Hakoah's Frank Lowy convened a meeting of clubs where attendees signed a resolution of intent that led to the launch of the National Soccer League (NSL) in 1977. The NSL became the first national club competition of any football code in Australia.

== Honours ==
- In the 1988 Australia Day Honours, Pongrass was awarded the Member of the Order of Australia (AM) in recognition of his services to the game.
- In November 2024, he was posthumously inducted into the Football Australia Hall of Fame as a participant at Brisbane's Suncorp Stadium.

== Death ==
Pongrass died in Sydney on 9 June 2000.
