= 1983 in Australian soccer =

Soccer in Australia
- Season: 1983

Men's soccer
- National Soccer League: St George-Budapest
- NSL Cup: Sydney Olympic

The 1983 season was the 14th season of national competitive soccer in Australia and 100th overall.

== National teams ==
=== Australia men's national soccer team ===
==== Results and fixtures ====
===== Friendlies =====
22 February 1983	New Zealand	2–1	Australia	Auckland, New Zealand
	Cresswell 47'; Ratcliffe 69' (o.g.)	Report	Kosmina 36'	Stadium: Mount Smart Stadium; Attendance: Referee: William Munro (New Zealand)

27 February 1983	Australia	0–2	New Zealand	Melbourne, Australia
		Report	Cole 66'; Adam 73'	Stadium: Olympic Park Stadium; Attendance: 14,000~; Referee: Jack Johnston (Australia)

12 June 1983	Australia	0–0	England	Sydney, Australia
		Report		Stadium: Sydney Cricket Ground; Attendance: 28,000; Referee: Tony Boskovic (Australia)

15 June 1983	Australia	0–1	England	Brisbane, Australia
		Report		Stadium: Lang Park; Attendance: 16,000; Referee: Peter Rampley (Australia)

19 June 1983	Australia	1–1	England	Melbourne, Australia
	Neal 27' (o.g.)	Report	Francis 25'	Stadium: Olympic Park Stadium; Attendance: 20,000; Referee: Jack Johnston (Australia)

===== 1983 Merlion Cup =====
4 December 1983	China	2–1	Australia	Singapore
		Report	Kosmina (?)

10 December 1983	Thailand	0–2	Australia	Singapore
		Report	Murphy (?); Kosmina (?)

15 December 1983	South Korea	1–3	Australia	Singapore
		Report	Kosmina (?); Cant (?); P. O'Connor (?)

18 December 1983	Singapore	2–4	Australia	Singapore
		Report	Watson (?); Kosmina (?); Campbell (?); P. O'Connor (?)

=== Australia women's national soccer team ===
==== Results and fixtures ====
===== 1983 OFC Women's Championship =====
====== First round ======
Pos	Team	Pld	W	D	L	GF	GA	GD	Pts	Qualification
1	New Zealand	3	2	1	0	21	1	+20	5	Advance to Final
2	Australia	3	2	1	0	18	0	+18	5	Advance to Final
3	New Caledonia (H)	3	1	0	2	2	11	−9	2	
4	Fiji	3	0	0	3	1	30	−29	0	

Source: RSSSF
(H) Hosts

28 November 1983	New Zealand	0–0	Australia	Nouméa, New Caledonia
		Report

30 November 1983	Australia	5–0	New Caledonia	Nouméa, New Caledonia
	Dolan (?); Heydon (?); Porter (?); Wardell (?)	Report

2 December 1983	Australia	13–0	Fiji	Nouméa, New Caledonia
	Monteath (?); Wardell (?); Iserief (?); Heydon (?); Millman (?)	Report

====== Final ======
4 December 1983	New Zealand	3–2 (a.e.t.)	Australia	Nouméa, New Caledonia
	Jacobsen (?); Sharpe (?); (unknown) (?)	Report	Brentnall (?); Dolan (?)

=== Australia men's national under-20 soccer team ===
==== Results and fixtures ====
===== 1983 FIFA World Youth Championship =====
====== Group A ======
Pos	Team	Pld	W	D	L	GF	GA	GD	Pts	Qualification
1	Scotland	3	2	0	1	4	2	+2	4	Advance to knockout stage
2	South Korea	3	2	0	1	4	4	0	4	Advance to knockout stage
3	Australia	3	1	1	1	4	4	0	3	
4	Mexico (H)	3	0	1	2	2	4	−2	1	

Source: RSSSF
(H) Hosts

2 June 1983	Mexico	1–1	Australia	Mexico City, Mexico
21:00 CT	Bernal 16'	Report	Farina 73'	Stadium: Estadio Azteca; Attendance: 108,900; Referee: Gérard Biguet (France)

5 June 1983	Scotland	1–2	Australia	Toluca, Mexico
16:00 CT	McStay 61'	Report	Incantalupo 52'; Patikas 87'	Stadium: Estadio Nemesio Díez; Attendance: 22,111; Referee: Carlos Espósito (Argentina)

8 June 1983	Australia	1–2	South Korea	Mexico City, Mexico
16:00 CT	Brown 53'	Report	Chong-kon 16'; Jong-boo 34'	Stadium: Estadio Azteca; Attendance: 24,812; Referee: Horst Brummeier (Austria)

===== 1983 FIFA World Youth Championship qualification =====
====== Inter-continental qualification ======
Pos	Team	Pld	W	D	L	GF	GA	GD	Pts	Qualification
1	Australia	4	3	0	1	9	5	+4	6	Qualification for 1983 FIFA World Youth Championship
2	Israel	4	2	1	1	6	3	+3	5	
3	Costa Rica (H)	4	0	1	3	1	8	−7	1	

Source: RSSSF
(H) Hosts

26 January 1983	Australia	1–3	Israel	San José, Costa Rica
	Brown (?)	Report	Cohen 46'; Menahem 60', 90'	Stadium: Estadio Nacional de la Sabana

30 January 1983	Costa Rica	1–3	Australia	San José, Costa Rica
	Ramírez 40'	Report	Patikas 16'; Lowe 24'; Farina 60'	Stadium: Estadio Nacional de la Sabana

1 February 1983	Israel	1–2	Australia	San José, Costa Rica
	Menahem 43'	Report	Brown (?); Lowe (?)	Stadium: Estadio Nacional de la Sabana

3 February 1983	Australia	3–0	Costa Rica	San José, Costa Rica
	Lowe 20' (pen.), 62'; Wright 24'	Report		Stadium: Estadio Nacional de la Sabana

=== Australia men's national under-17 soccer team ===
==== Results and fixtures ====
===== 1983 OFC U-17 Championship =====
Pos	Team	Pld	W	D	L	GF	GA	GD	Pts	Qualification
1	Australia	5	5	0	0	22	2	+20	10	Qualification for 1985 FIFA U-16 World Championship
2	New Zealand (H)	5	3	1	1	7	2	+5	7	
3	Chinese Taipei	5	2	1	2	11	4	+7	5	
4	New Caledonia	5	2	0	3	6	12	−6	4	
5	Fiji	5	0	2	3	6	18	−12	2	
6	Tahiti	5	0	2	3	3	17	−14	2	

Source: RSSSF
(H) Hosts

December 1983	Australia	2–1	New Zealand	Auckland, New Zealand
		Report

December 1983	Australia	3–0	Chinese Taipei	Auckland, New Zealand
		Report

December 1983	Australia	4–0	New Caledonia	Auckland, New Zealand
		Report

December 1983	Australia	4–1	Fiji	Auckland, New Zealand
		Report

December 1983	Australia	9–0	Tahiti	Auckland, New Zealand
		Report

== Domestic soccer ==
=== National Soccer League ===
Pos	Team	Pld	W	D	L	GF	GA	GD	Pts
1	St George-Budapest (C)	30	15	10	5	47	27	+20	55
2	Sydney City	30	15	9	6	48	30	+18	54
3	Preston Makedonia	30	15	7	8	47	32	+15	52
4	South Melbourne	30	15	7	8	44	36	+8	52
5	Newcastle KB United	30	14	7	9	45	26	+19	49
6	Heidelberg United	30	11	10	9	39	38	+1	43
7	Sydney Olympic	30	12	5	13	38	36	+2	41
8	APIA Leichhardt	30	11	6	13	43	36	+7	39
9	Marconi Fairfield	30	9	11	10	43	41	+2	38
10	Canberra City	30	11	5	14	47	53	−6	38
11	Adelaide City	30	10	6	14	37	38	−1	36
12	Footscray JUST	30	9	9	12	25	42	−17	36
13	West Adelaide	30	7	12	11	25	37	−12	33
14	Brisbane City	30	8	9	13	33	50	−17	33
15	Wollongong City	30	4	15	11	41	55	−14	27
16	Brisbane Lions	30	6	8	16	36	61	−25	26

Updated to match(es) played on unknown. Source: rsssf.com
Rules for classification: 1) points; 2) goal difference; 3) number of goals scored.
(C) Champions

=== NSL Cup ===
==== Final ====
6 November 1983

Sydney Olympic	1–0	Heidelberg United
Patalis 64'	Report

St George Stadium, Sydney
Attendance: 6,420
Referee: Tony Boskovic
13 November 1983

Heidelberg United	0–1	Sydney Olympic
	Report	Patalis 82'

Olympic Park, Melbourne
Attendance: 6,000
Referee: Chris Bambridge
