= Tagg =

Tagg may refer to:

== People ==
- Barclay Tagg (born 1937), American horse trainer
- Ernie Tagg (1917–2006), English football player
- Mike Tagg (born 1946), English long-distance runner
- Peter Tagg (born 1959), English drummer
- Trixie Tagg (fl. 1979–1989), Australian educator, former soccer player and former soccer coach
- Tagg Bozied (born 1979), American baseball player
- Tagg Romney (born 1970), American businessman, son of politician Mitt Romney

== Other uses ==
- Tagg, in Wolof music an ode of pre-Islamic origin
- TAGG – The Alternative Gig Guide, a free fortnightly Australian music newspaper published from 1979 to 1981
- Tagg's Island, an island in the River Thames, England

== See also ==
- Tagg Flats, Oklahoma, United States, a census-designated place
- Tag (disambiguation)
