= Peter Boyle (footballer, born 1951) =

Australian soccer player and manager (1951–2013)

Personal information
- Full name: Peter Boyle
- Date of birth: 24 March 1951
- Place of birth: Glasgow, Scotland
- Date of death: 16 January 2013 (aged 61)
- Place of death: Australia
- Position: Striker

Senior career*
Years	Team	Apps	(Gls)
1972–1977	Clyde	119	(32)
1977–1981	West Adelaide	83	(15)
1981–1982	Preston Makedonia		
1983–1984	Green Gully		
1985–1986	Fawkner		

International career
1980	Australia	1	(0)

Managerial career
- 1985–1986: Fawkner
- * Club domestic league appearances and goals

Peter Boyle (24 March 1951 – 16 January 2013) was a footballer and manager who played as a striker. Born in Scotland, he represented Australia at international level.

== Career ==
Boyle began his career with Scottish junior side Larkhall Thistle, before signing for Clyde in 1972. He netted 32 goals in 119 league appearances for the Shawfield club, before moving to Australia in 1977 to join West Adelaide Hellas Soccer Club in the Phillips National Soccer League.

In 1980, Boyle received a call up to the Australian national team. He got his only international cap in a friendly with Czechoslovakia in the same year.

== Honours ==
Larkhall Thistle

- Dryburgh Cup: 1971–72
- RJ McLeod Cup: 1971–72

Clyde

- Scottish Division Two: 1972–73

West Adelaide

- National Soccer League: 1978

Green Gully

- Victorian State League: 1983
- VSL Ampol Cup: 1983
- VSL Cup: Runner-up 1983
