= Van Balkom =

van Balkom is a surname. Notable people with the surname include:

- Frans van Balkom (1939–2015), Dutch football player and manager
- Patrick van Balkom (born 1974), Dutch sprinter

== See also ==
- Balkcom, another surname
