= 1986 FIFA World Cup qualification (UEFA–OFC play-off) =

- Event: 1986 FIFA World Cup qualification
Scotland	Australia
(Scotland)	(Australia)
2	0
- Scotland won 2–0 on aggregate

First leg
Scotland	Australia
2	0
- Date: 20 November 1985
- Venue: Hampden Park, Glasgow
- Referee: Vojtěch Christov (Czechoslovakia)
- Attendance: 62,329

Second leg
Australia	Scotland
0	0
- Date: 4 December 1985
- Venue: Olympic Park, Melbourne
- Referee: José Roberto Ramiz Wright (Brazil)
- Attendance: 29,852

The 1986 FIFA World Cup UEFA–OFC qualification play-off was a two-legged home-and-away tie between the winners of the Oceania qualifying tournament, Australia, and the second-placed team from the UEFA Group 7, Scotland. The games were played on 20 November and 4 December 1985 in Glasgow and Melbourne respectively. Australia were hoping to play in the FIFA World Cup for the first time since 1974 and Scotland were hoping for a fourth successive FIFA World Cup.

== Background ==
Scotland had qualified for the play-off by finishing second in their UEFA group, behind Spain. Scotland secured second place in dramatic circumstances with a 1–1 draw against Wales at Ninian Park, Cardiff. Davie Cooper scored a late equalising goal with a penalty kick to give Scotland the point they needed, but manager Jock Stein collapsed and died of a heart attack. This meant that assistant manager Alex Ferguson took charge of the team for the play-off.

Australia finished top of a single four-team group that comprised New Zealand, as well as Israel and Chinese Taipei, both of whom were at the time members of FIFA but were outside their own regional confederations.

Scotland

Team	Pld	W	D	L	GF	GA	GD	Pts
Spain	6	4	0	2	9	8	1	8
Scotland	6	3	1	2	8	4	4	7
Wales	6	3	1	2	7	6	1	7
Iceland	6	1	0	5	4	10	−6	2

Round
Final standings
Australia

Team	Pld	W	D	L	GF	GA	GD	Pts
Australia	6	4	2	0	20	2	18	10
Israel	6	3	1	2	17	6	11	7
New Zealand	6	3	1	2	13	7	6	7
Chinese Taipei	6	0	0	6	1	36	−35	0

== Play-off match ==
In the first leg of the play-off in Hampden Park on 20 November 1985, Scotland took the lead in the 53rd minute from a twenty-yard free kick scored by Davie Cooper, hitting the ball around the wall and into the bottom right hand corner of the net. The second goal arrived in the 59th minute from Frank McAvennie who was making his senior debut for Scotland. He lobbed the ball over the goalkeeper after being set up by a header from Kenny Dalglish. The second leg on 4 December finished goalless which was enough for Scotland to advance to the 1986 FIFA World Cup finals in Mexico.

=== First leg ===
1986 FIFA World Cup qualification playoff
20 November 1985
First leg

Scotland	2–0	Australia
Cooper 53'; McAvennie 59'	Report

Hampden Park, Glasgow
Attendance: 62,329
Referee: Vojtech Christov (Czechoslovakia)

Scotland
Australia

GK	1	Jim Leighton (Aberdeen)
DF	2	Steve Nicol (Liverpool)
DF	5	Alex McLeish (Aberdeen)
DF	6	Willie Miller (Aberdeen)
DF	3	Maurice Malpas (Dundee United)
MF	8	Gordon Strachan (Manchester United)
MF	4	Graeme Souness (c) (Sampdoria)
MF	10	Roy Aitken (Celtic)
MF	11	Davie Cooper (Rangers)
FW	7	Kenny Dalglish (Liverpool)
FW	9	Frank McAvennie (West Ham United)
Substitutions:
Manager:
(Scotland) Alex Ferguson

GK	1	Terry Greedy (St. George)
DF	2	Alan Davidson (Unattached)
DF	3	Graham Jennings (Sydney Olympic)
DF	4	Charlie Yankos (Heidelberg United)
DF	5	David Ratcliffe (St. George)
DF	6	Steve O'Connor (Sydney City)
MF	7	Joe Watson (Sydney City)
FW	8	Kenny Murphy (South Melbourne)
MF	9	Oscar Crino (Anorthosis Famagusta)
FW	10	David Mitchell (Eintracht Frankfurt)
FW	11	John Kosmina (Sydney City)
Substitutions:
Manager:
(Socialist Federal Republic of Yugoslavia) Frank Arok

OFFICIALS

- Assistant referees:
  - Ivan Gregr (Czechoslovakia)
  - Josef Poncek (Czechoslovakia)

MATCH RULES

- 90 minutes
- 2 (of ?) substitutions permitted

=== Second leg ===
4 December 1985
Second leg

Australia	0–0	Scotland
	Report

Olympic Park, Melbourne
Attendance: 29,852
Referee: José Roberto Wright (Brazil)

Australia
Scotland

GK	1	Terry Greedy (St. George)
DF	2	Alan Davidson (Unattached)
DF	3	Graham Jennings (Sydney Olympic)
DF	4	Charlie Yankos (Heidelberg United)
DF	5	David Ratcliffe (St. George)
DF	6	Robbie Dunn (Preston Makedonia)
MF	7	Jim Patikas (Sydney Croatia)
FW	8	Kenny Murphy (South Melbourne)
MF	9	Oscar Crino (Anorthosis Famagusta)
FW	10	David Mitchell (Eintracht Frankfurt)
FW	11	John Kosmina (Sydney City)
Substitutions:
Manager:
(Socialist Federal Republic of Yugoslavia) Frank Arok

GK	1	Jim Leighton (Aberdeen)
DF	2	Richard Gough (Dundee United)
DF	5	Alex McLeish (Aberdeen)
DF	6	Willie Miller (Aberdeen)
DF	3	Maurice Malpas (Dundee United)
MF	8	Paul McStay (Celtic)
MF	4	Graeme Souness (c) (Sampdoria)
MF	10	Roy Aitken (Celtic)
MF	11	Davie Cooper (Rangers)
FW	7	David Speedie (Chelsea)
FW	9	Frank McAvennie (West Ham United)
Substitutions:
Manager:
(Scotland) Alex Ferguson

OFFICIALS

- Assistant referees:
  - Romualdo Arppi Filho (Brazil)
  - Carlos Felix Ferreira (Brazil)

MATCH RULES

- 90 minutes
- 30 minutes of extra-time if necessary
- Penalty shoot-out if scores still level:
- 2 (of 2) substitutions permitted

== Aftermath ==
Scotland qualified for the 1986 FIFA World Cup Finals in Mexico and were drawn into Group E with West Germany, Uruguay and debutants Denmark. Scotland lost 1–0 to Denmark and 2–1 to West Germany. Scotland had to beat Uruguay and Uruguay played with ten men and drew 0–0. Scotland finished bottom in the group on one point.
