= Roy Hay =

Roy Hay may refer to:

- Roy Hay (horticulturist) (1910–1989), English horticultural journalist and broadcaster
- Roy Hay (musician) (born 1961), British keyboard player and member of Culture Club
- Roy Hay (writer) (born 1940) Scottish-born Australian academic, sports writer and historian.
