= Jimmy Hay =

Scottish footballer and manager

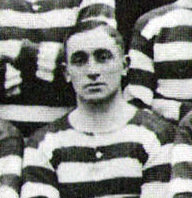

Personal information
- Full name: James Hay
- Date of birth: 9 February 1881
- Place of birth: Tarbolton, Ayrshire, Scotland
- Date of death: 4 April 1940 (aged 59)
- Place of death: Ayr, Scotland
- Position: Half back

Senior career*
Years	Team	Apps	(Gls)
–1900	Woodside Annbank		
1900–1902	Annbank		
1902	Ayr	5	(0)
1902	Glossop	0	(0)
1902–1903	Ayr	20	(3)
1903–1911	Celtic	214	(14)
1911–1915	Newcastle United	217	(17)
1915–1921	Ayr United	85	(1)
1919	→ Clydebank (guest)	1	(0)

International career
1905–1914	Scotland	11	(0)
1909–1911	Scottish League XI	6	(0)

Managerial career
- 1922–1924: Clydebank
- 1924–1926: Ayr United
- * Club domestic league appearances and goals

James Hay (9 February 1881 – 4 April 1940) was a Scottish footballer, who played for Ayr, Celtic, Newcastle United, Ayr United and the Scotland national team.

Hay was born in Tarbolton, Ayrshire and signed for Celtic for £50 from Ayr FC in March 1903. Described as a strong tackler, Hay captained Celtic between 1906 and 1911 and made a total of 322 appearances for the club, scoring 23 goals. He was part of the Celtic side which won six consecutive league titles between season 1904–05 and season 1909–10 under the management of Willie Maley.

He left Celtic in 1911 after the club failed to meet his improved contract demands and joined English club Newcastle United. He returned to Scotland in 1915 with Ayr United, where he remained for three years. He served as a gunner in the Royal Field Artillery during the First World War.

He was capped 11 times by Scotland between 1905 and 1914 and captained his country on three occasions. Hay also represented the Scottish League XI.

Hay was appointed manager of Clydebank in April 1922. He later became manager at former club Ayr United in June 1924. The club were relegated from the First Division in his first season as manager. Hay left the club in January 1926, after he accused Ayr United director Tom Steen of trying to bribe a referee. Hay was banned indefinitely by the Scottish Football Association after he refused to apologise, but the suspension was lifted in November 1927. He later had a career as an insurance agent, until his death on 4 April 1940.

His grandson Roy Hay was inducted into the Football Australia Hall of Fame in 2025.

== See also ==
- List of Scotland national football team captains
