= Laurie Schwab =

Australian journalist and broadcaster

Laurie Schwab (1946/1947 – 11 June 1997) was an Australian journalist and broadcaster. Schwab was best known as a soccer writer for The Age newspaper in Melbourne.

== Early life ==
Schwab was the son of German immigrants and grew up in St Albans, Victoria.

== Journalism ==
He joined The Age in the early 1970s where he soon became a soccer writer. He later founded and edited a specialised soccer newspaper, Soccer Action, published by The Age's parent company Fairfax. He also occasionally commentated on the game for ABC Radio.

Schwab died in June 1997, aged 50. For his services to soccer he was posthumously inducted into the Australian Soccer Hall of Fame (now the Football Australia Hall of Fame) in 1999.
