= Norman Conquest (soccer) =

Australian soccer player (1916–1968)

Personal information
- Date of birth: 1916
- Date of death: 1968 (aged 51–52)
- Position: Goalkeeper

Senior career*
Years	Team	Apps	(Gls)
- Aberdare
- Grace Bros
1947	North Shore		

International career
1947–1950	Australia	11	(0)
- * Club domestic league appearances and goals

Norman Conquest (1916–1968) was an Australian soccer player who played as a goalkeeper. He represented Australia eleven times.

== Playing career ==
=== Club career ===
Conquest played for a number of teams in New South Wales, including Aberdare, Grace Brothers and North Shore.

=== International career ===
Conquest played eleven times for Australia between 1947 and 1950. He toured with the Australian team in South Africa. He was the Australian goalkeeper in a 1951 match between Australia and an English Football Association XI representative side at the Sydney Showground which Australia lost 17–0. He also represented the New South Wales state team.

== Later years and death ==
Conquest died at the age of 51 in 1968.

== Honours ==
In 2002 Conquest was posthumously inducted into the Football Federation Australia Hall of Fame.
