= André Krüger =

German statistician

André Krüger (born c. 12.May 1960, Hannover) is a German statistician. Krüger has spent over 30 years researching Australian football (soccer) in an attempt to produce a complete record of all "Socceroos" internationals since 1922. His initial interest in Australian football stemmed from the Australian national team playing at the 1974 FIFA World Cup finals in his home country of Germany.

Krüger has compiled a large collection of Australian football history, including team photographs, videos, programs and magazine articles. The material was researched from his own funds, despite living in Europe.

He was inducted into the Australian football Hall of Fame in 2006, the same year the Australia played in the 2006 FIFA World Cup in Germany. Krüger was well known in the German media during the 2006 World Cup, and often referred to as "the biggest fan of the Socceroos".
