= 1986 FIFA World Cup qualification =

Tournament details
- Teams: 121 (from 6 confederations)

Tournament statistics
- Matches played: 308
- Goals scored: 801 (2.6 per match)
- Top scorer(s): (Denmark) Preben Elkjær (Honduras) José Figueroa (8 goals each)

121 teams entered the 1986 FIFA World Cup qualification rounds, competing for 24 places in the final tournament. Mexico, as the hosts, and Italy, as the defending champions, qualified automatically, leaving 22 spots open for competition. The draw took place on 7 December 1983 in Zürich, Switzerland.

The 24 spots available in the 1986 World Cup would be distributed among the continental zones as follows:

- Europe (UEFA): 13.5 places, 1 of them went to automatic qualifier Italy, while the other 12.5 places were contested by 32 teams. The winner of the 0.5 place would advance to the intercontinental play-offs (against a team from OFC).
- South America (CONMEBOL): 4 places, contested by 10 teams.
- North, Central America, and Caribbean (CONCACAF): 2 places, 1 of them went to automatic qualifier Mexico, while the other place was contested by 17 teams.
- Africa (CAF): 2 places, contested by 29 teams.
- Asia (AFC): 2 places, contested by 27 teams.
- Oceania (OFC): 0.5 place, contested by 4 teams (including Israel and Chinese Taipei). The winner of the 0.5 place would advance to the intercontinental play-offs (against a team from UEFA).

A total of 110 teams played at least one qualifying match. A total of 308 qualifying matches were played, and 801 goals were scored (an average of 2.60 per match).

== Confederation qualification ==
=== AFC ===
==== Zone A ====
Pos	Team	Pld	W	D	L	GF	GA	GD	Pts	Qualification
1.	Iraq	2	1	1	0	3	1	2	3	Final Tournament
2.	Syria	2	0	1	1	1	3	-2	1	

==== Zone B ====
Pos	Team	Pld	W	D	L	GF	GA	GD	Pts	Qualification
1.	South Korea	2	2	0	0	3	1	2	4	Final Tournament
2.	Japan	2	0	0	2	1	3	-2	0	

Iraq and Korea Republic qualified.

=== CAF ===
Pos	Team	Pld	W	D	L	GF	GA	GD	Pts	Qualification
1.	Algeria	2	2	0	0	7	1	6	4	Final Tournament
2.	Tunisia	2	0	0	2	1	7	-6	0	

Pos	Team	Pld	W	D	L	GF	GA	GD	Pts	Qualification
1.	Morocco	2	2	0	0	3	1	2	4	Final Tournament
2.	Libya	2	0	0	2	1	3	-2	0	

Algeria and Morocco qualified.

=== CONCACAF ===
Pos	Team	Pld	W	D	L	GF	GA	GD	Pts	Qualification
1.	Canada	4	2	2	0	4	2	+2	6	Final Tournament
2.	Honduras	4	1	1	2	6	6	0	3	
3.	Costa Rica	4	0	3	1	4	6	−2	3	

Canada qualified.

=== CONMEBOL ===
==== Group 1 ====
Pos	Team	Pld	W	D	L	GF	GA	GD	Pts	Qualification
1.	Argentina	6	4	1	1	12	6	+6	9	Final Tournament
2.	Peru	6	3	2	1	8	4	+4	8	Advance to CONMEBOL playoffs
3.	Colombia	6	2	2	2	6	6	0	6	Advance to CONMEBOL playoffs
4.	Venezuela	6	0	1	5	5	15	−10	1	

==== Group 2 ====
Pos	Team	Pld	W	D	L	GF	GA	GD	Pts	Qualification
1.	Uruguay	4	3	0	1	6	4	+2	6	Final Tournament
2.	Chile	4	2	1	1	10	5	+5	5	Advance to CONMEBOL playoffs
3.	Ecuador	4	0	1	3	4	11	−7	1	

==== Group 3 ====
Pos	Team	Pld	W	D	L	GF	GA	GD	Pts	Qualification
1.	Brazil	4	2	2	0	6	2	+4	6	Final Tournament
2.	Paraguay	4	1	2	1	5	4	+1	4	Advance to CONMEBOL playoffs
3.	Bolivia	4	0	2	2	2	7	−5	2	

==== CONMEBOL Playoffs ====
===== First Round =====
Pos	Team	Pld	W	D	L	GF	GA	GD	Pts	Qualification
1.	Paraguay	2	1	0	1	4	2	2	2	Final Round
2.	Colombia	2	1	0	1	2	4	-2	2	

Pos	Team	Pld	W	D	L	GF	GA	GD	Pts	Qualification
1.	Chile	2	2	0	0	5	2	3	4	Final Round
2.	Peru	2	0	0	2	2	5	-3	0	

===== Final Round =====
Pos	Team	Pld	W	D	L	GF	GA	GD	Pts	Qualification
1.	Paraguay	2	1	1	0	5	2	3	3	Final Tournament
2.	Chile	2	0	1	1	2	5	-3	1	

Group 1 – Argentina qualified. Peru and Colombia advanced to the CONMEBOL play-offs.
Group 2 – Uruguay qualified. Chile advanced to the CONMEBOL play-offs.
Group 3 – Brazil qualified. Paraguay advanced to the CONMEBOL play-offs.
Play-offs – Paraguay qualified over Chile, Colombia and Peru.

=== OFC ===
Pos	Team	Pld	W	D	L	GF	GA	GD	Pts	Qualification
1	Australia	6	4	2	0	20	2	+18	10	Advance to Inter-confederation playoffs
2	Israel	6	3	1	2	17	6	+11	7	
3	New Zealand	6	3	1	2	13	7	+6	7	
4	Chinese Taipei	6	0	0	6	1	36	−35	0	

Australia advanced to the UEFA–OFC intercontinental play-off

=== UEFA ===
==== Group 1 ====
Pos	Team	Pld	W	D	L	GF	GA	GD	Pts	Qualification
1.	Poland	6	3	2	1	10	6	+4	8	Final Tournament
2.	Belgium	6	3	2	1	7	3	+4	8	Advance to UEFA Playoffs
3.	Albania	6	1	2	3	6	9	−3	4	
4.	Greece	6	1	2	3	5	10	−5	4	

==== Group 2 ====
Pos	Team	Pld	W	D	L	GF	GA	GD	Pts	Qualification
1.	West Germany	8	5	2	1	22	9	+13	12	Final Tournament
2.	Portugal	8	5	0	3	12	10	+2	10	Final Tournament
3.	Sweden	8	4	1	3	14	9	+5	9	
4.	Czechoslovakia	8	3	2	3	11	12	−1	8	
5.	Malta	8	0	1	7	6	25	−19	1	

==== Group 3 ====
Pos	Team	Pld	W	D	L	GF	GA	GD	Pts	Qualification
1.	England	8	4	4	0	21	2	+19	12	Final Tournament
2.	Northern Ireland	8	4	2	2	8	5	+3	10	Final Tournament
3.	Romania	8	3	3	2	12	7	+5	9	
4.	Finland	8	3	2	3	7	12	−5	8	
5.	Turkey	8	0	1	7	2	24	−22	1	

==== Group 4 ====
Pos	Team	Pld	W	D	L	GF	GA	GD	Pts	Qualification
1.	France	8	5	1	2	15	4	+11	11	Final Tournament
2.	Bulgaria	8	5	1	2	13	5	+8	11	Final Tournament
3.	East Germany	8	5	0	3	16	9	+7	10	
4.	Yugoslavia	8	3	2	3	7	8	−1	8	
5.	Luxembourg	8	0	0	8	2	27	−25	0	

==== Group 5 ====
Pos	Team	Pld	W	D	L	GF	GA	GD	Pts	Qualification
1.	Hungary	6	5	0	1	12	4	+8	10	Final Tournament
2.	Netherlands	6	3	1	2	11	5	+6	7	Advance to UEFA Playoffs
3.	Austria	6	3	1	2	9	8	+1	7	
4.	Cyprus	6	0	0	6	3	18	−15	0	

==== Group 6 ====
Pos	Team	Pld	W	D	L	GF	GA	GD	Pts	Qualification
1.	Denmark	8	5	1	2	17	6	+11	11	Final Tournament
2.	Soviet Union	8	4	2	2	13	8	+5	10	Final Tournament
3.	Switzerland	8	2	4	2	5	10	−5	8	
4.	Republic of Ireland	8	2	2	4	5	10	−5	6	
5.	Norway	8	1	3	4	4	10	−6	5	

==== Group 7 ====
Pos	Team	Pld	W	D	L	GF	GA	GD	Pts	Qualification
1.	Spain	6	4	0	2	9	8	+1	8	Final Tournament
2.	Scotland	6	3	1	2	8	4	+4	7	Advance to Inter-confederation playoffs
3.	Wales	6	3	1	2	7	6	+1	7	
4.	Iceland	6	1	0	5	4	10	−6	2	

==== UEFA Playoffs ====
Pos	Team	Pld	W	D	L	GF	GA	GD	Pts	Qualification
1.	Belgium	2	1	0	1	2	2	0	2*	Final Tournament
2.	Netherlands	2	1	0	1	2	2	0	2*	

*As Belgium and the Netherlands finished with the same record, Belgium advanced on away goals.

Group 1 – Poland qualified. Belgium advanced to the UEFA play-offs.
Group 2 – West Germany and Portugal qualified.
Group 3 – England and Northern Ireland qualified.
Group 4 – France and Bulgaria qualified.
Group 5 – Hungary qualified. Netherlands advanced to the UEFA play-offs.
Group 6 – Denmark and USSR qualified.
Group 7 – Spain qualified. Scotland advanced to the UEFA–OFC intercontinental play-off.
Play-offs – Belgium qualified over Netherlands.

== Inter-confederation play-offs: UEFA v OFC ==
The two teams would play against each other on a home-and-away basis. The winner qualified for the 1986 FIFA World Cup.

Team 1	Agg.	Team 2	1st leg	2nd leg
Scotland	2–0	Australia	2–0	0–0

== Qualified teams ==
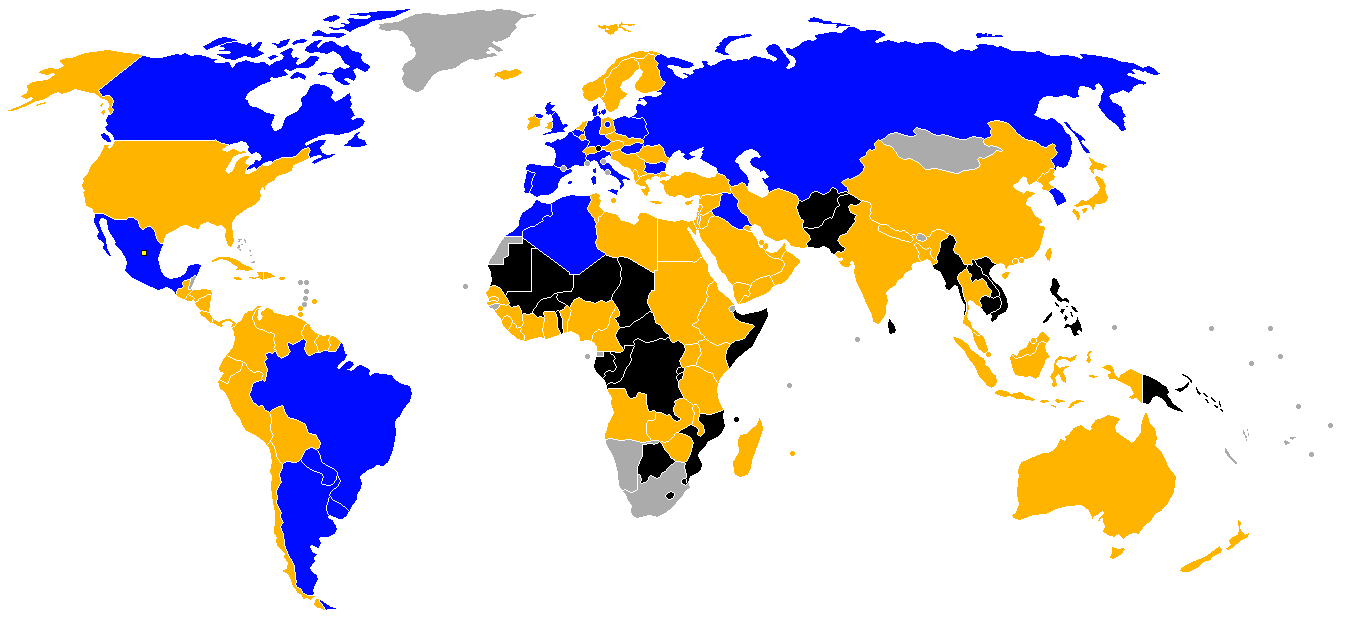
Final qualification status Country qualified for World Cup Country failed to qualify Country did not enter World Cup Country not a FIFA member

The following 24 teams qualified for the 1986 FIFA World Cup:

Team	Date of qualification	Finals appearance	Streak	Last appearance
Algeria	18 October 1985	2nd	2	1982
Argentina	30 June 1985	9th	4	1982
Belgium	20 November 1985	7th	2	1982
Brazil	23 June 1985	13th	13	1982
Bulgaria	28 September 1985	5th	1	1974
Canada	14 September 1985	1st	1	—
Denmark	13 November 1985	1st	1	—
England	16 October 1985	8th	2	1982
France	16 November 1985	9th	3	1982
Hungary	17 April 1985	9th	3	1982
Iraq	29 November 1985	1st	1	—
Italy (defending champions)	11 July 1982	11th	7	1982
South Korea	3 November 1985	2nd	1	1954
Mexico (hosts)	20 May 1983	9th	1	1978
Morocco	18 October 1985	2nd	1	1970
Northern Ireland	13 November 1985	3rd	2	1982
Paraguay	17 November 1985	4th	1	1958
Poland	11 September 1985	5th	4	1982
Portugal	16 October 1985	2nd	1	1966
Scotland	4 December 1985	6th	4	1982
Spain	25 September 1985	7th	3	1982
Uruguay	7 April 1985	8th	1	1974
Soviet Union	30 October 1985	6th	2	1982
West Germany	25 September 1985	11th	9	1982

(h) – qualified automatically as hosts

(c) – qualified automatically as defending champions

== Top goalscorers ==
8 goals

- (Denmark) Preben Elkjær
- (Honduras) José Figueroa

7 goals

- (Chile) Jorge Aravena
- (Hong Kong) Lau Wing Yip

6 goals

- (China) Zhao Dayu
- (East Germany) Rainer Ernst

5 goals

- (Australia) John Kosmina
- (Australia) Dave Mitchell
- (England) Bryan Robson
- (Israel) Zahi Armeli
- (Japan) Kazushi Kimura
- (Portugal) Fernando Gomes
- (Soviet Union) Oleh Protasov
- (Tunisia) Bassam Jeridi

== Notes ==
- West Germany lost a World Cup qualifying match for the first time on 16 October 1985, when they were defeated 0–1 by Portugal in Stuttgart, in what was their 37th World Cup qualifier (including games played by Germany before World War II). Of the other three losses that the (now-reunified) German team suffered in the competition, two also took place on home soil: 1–5 to England in Munich in 2001, and 1–2 to North Macedonia in Duisburg in 2021, and one away: 0–2 to Slovakia in Bratislava in 2025. With only four losses in over 100 games, Germany remains the team with by far the lowest loss ratio in the FIFA World Cup qualification.
- Scotland manager Jock Stein died during their qualifier at Wales, suffering a heart attack immediately after the Scots scored a late equaliser.
- Iraq qualified for their only World Cup up until 2026.
