= Terry Greedy =

Australian soccer player

Terry Greedy (born 27 August 1955) is an Australian retired soccer player who played as a goalkeeper. He represented the Australian national team between 1983 and 1985, making 16 international appearances. At club level, he played in the National Soccer League for St George Saints and APIA Leichhardt.

== Early life ==
Terry Greedy was born in Lismore, New South Wales, where he played in local junior soccer for Eastwood United and trained as a schoolteacher.

== Club career ==
After completing his teacher training in 1978, Greedy was able to move to the Sydney area to pursue a soccer career. Over the next four years, he played semi-professionally in the New South Wales State League for Bankstown and Melita Eagles. Melita coach Attila Abonyi recommended Greedy to his former club St George Saints, where Abonyi's friend and former teammate Frank Arok was coach. Greedy subsequently signed for St George and became a top-flight player in the National Soccer League (NSL) at the age of 27. He played in the NSL for St George from 1982 to 1986, winning the league in 1983, and for APIA Leichhardt in 1988.

== International career ==
Following Arok's appointment as the coach of the Australian national team in 1983, Greedy was called up to the squad for a series of matches against the touring England team in June that year, making his international debut in the first match of the series at Sydney. He was the first choice goalkeeper over the next two years, including the qualifying matches for the 1986 World Cup. After winning the Oceania qualifying group, Australia faced Scotland in a two-legged play-off to qualify for the finals, but lost 2–0 on aggregate. According to Greedy, he chose to retire from the national team after these matches on a point of principle following a dispute over money between the players and the national federation.

Despite his brief international career, Greedy was later named in the Socceroos Team of the Decade for the 1980s. He made 16 full international appearances and – including unofficial matches against club teams – played for Australia 36 times in total. He also played for New South Wales state representative teams.

== After soccer ==
Greedy was inducted into the Football Federation Australia Hall of Fame in 2007. Outside of his sport, he continued to pursue a teaching career and retired around 2015 having latterly been a school principal in Woy Woy, New South Wales.
