= Mike Cockerill =

Australian sports journalist

Michael Cockerill
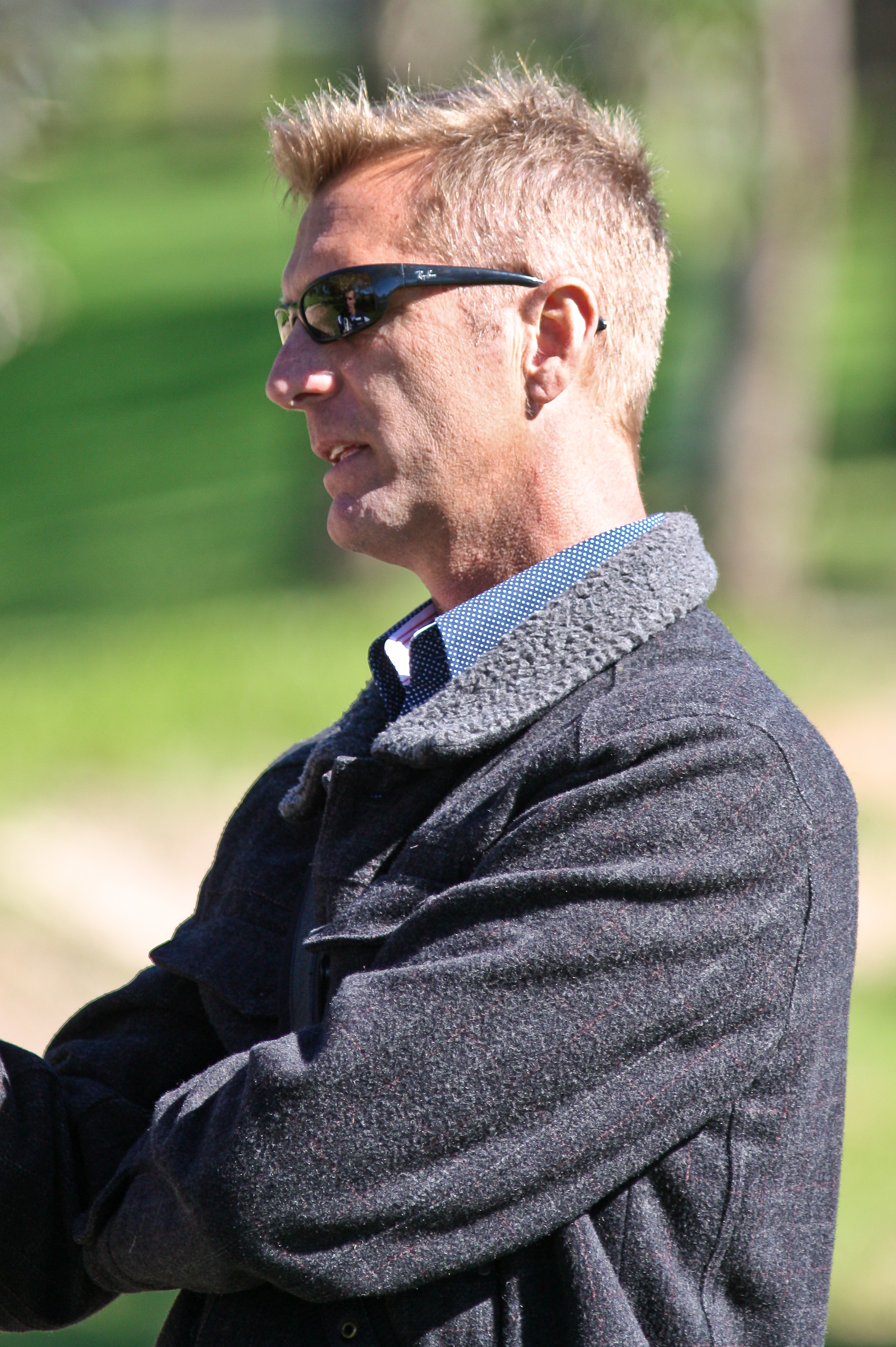
- Born: 20 November 1960; Adelaide, Australia
- Died: 31 August 2017 (aged 56); Bellingen, Australia

Michael Cockerill (20 November 1960 – 31 August 2017) was an investigative Australian football (soccer) journalist who wrote for Fairfax newspapers, Fox Sports and formerly C7 Sport. He was also a football pundit and match commentator and appeared regularly on the football show Fox Sports FC.

In 2011, he was inducted into the Football Federation Australia Hall of Fame.

It was announced that he had died from illness, just before the Japan–Australia World Cup qualifier on 31 August 2017.

== Awards and honours ==
He has been honoured by the Football Federation Australia through the award of the Michael Cockerill Medal, recognizing the standout National Premier Leagues performer in each season's FFA Cup competition.
