= Joseph Honeysett =

Joe Huxley Honeysett
Personal information
- Full name: Joseph Huxley Honeysett
- Date of birth: 1890
- Place of birth: Dulwich, London, England
- Date of death: 1968 (aged 77–78)
- Position: Centre-forward

Senior career*
Years	Team	Apps	(Gls)
1910–1924	South Hobart FC		

International career
1910–1924	Southern Tasmania		
1912–1924	Tasmania		
- * Club domestic league appearances and goals

Joseph Huxley Honeysett (1890 – 1968) was an English-born Australian pioneer of association football (soccer) and a World War I veteran. He was a centre-forward in Tasmania, captaining the state team to its first international victory in 1923, and later became a foundational administrator of the sport in the Australian Capital Territory (ACT). He was posthumously inducted into the Football Australia Hall of Fame in 2021.

== Early life ==
Honeysett was born in London, England, in 1890. His family migrated to Australia in 1904, settling on a farm in New Norfolk near Hobart, Tasmania.

== Football career ==
=== Tasmania ===
Honeysett began playing local football for New Norfolk Football Club in 1906.

In 1910, at 20 years of age he was elected as a committee member of the Tasmania British Football Association. That year his father was founding secretary of South Hobart FC where he later played.

Honeysett played centre-forward for South Hobart FC, Southern Tasmania, and the Tasmanian state team. In 1912, representing Southern Tasmania against Northern Tasmania in an intrastate match, he scored seven goals in a single game - a Tasmanian record that remains unbroken.

His playing career was interrupted by military service during World War I, but he returned to the pitch following his repatriation. In 1923, Honeysett captained the Tasmanian state team to a 2–1 victory over a touring team from the Republic of China at the South Hobart Ground. It was the first time Tasmania had ever defeated an international side.

=== Australian Capital Territory ===
In 1924, Honeysett relocated to the newly establishing Federal Capital Territory (now the ACT) for work as a Social Service Officer in the Federal Capital Commission.

In 1925, he convened the inaugural meeting of the Federal Territory Soccer Football Association, laying the groundwork for organised football in Canberra. He served the association as a player, executive secretary, referee, and team manager during the league's formative years.

== Military service ==
Following the outbreak of World War I, Honeysett enlisted in the First Australian Imperial Force (AIF). He served initially with the 40th Battalion and later promoted to Captain and transferred to the 47th Battalion.

During action on the Western Front on the evening of 11 April 1917 during the first attack on Bullecourt, Honeysett was severely wounded and subsequently captured by German forces. As a prisoner of war he was held at the Karisruhe, Krefeld and Clausthal POW camps in Germany. During his captivity, he made multiple escape attempts. Following the armistice, he was repatriated and awarded the Military Cross (MC) in 1919 in recognition of his gallantry and resourcefulness during his escape efforts.

== Personal life and legacy ==
In 1953, he was awarded the Queen Elizabeth II Coronation Medal for his public and community service.

In 2021, Football Australia recognised Honeysett's contributions to the code by posthumously inducting him into the Football Australia Hall of Fame.

==== Family ====
In 2003, His father (Joseph J Honeysett) was inducted into the Football Australia Hall of Fame for his service to Tasmanian football.

His son, Brigadier Joseph David Honeysett, later had a distinguished military career in the Australian Army, serving within the Royal Australian Corps of Signals.
