= Theresa Deas =

Australian soccer player

Theresa Deas née Jones (born 1963) is an Australian former soccer player who played for the Australia women's national soccer team between 1980 and 1988.

Deas represented Victoria at the Australian Women's Soccer Association's national championships from 1978 to 1998, winning the national championships twice. She was inducted into the Football Federation Australia Hall of Fame in 2003. Deas was inducted into the Football Federation Victoria (FFV) Hall of Fame in 2011 and is a life member of FFV. Since retiring as a player, she has been involved in player development, administration, coaching and the formation of WNPL Clubs in Victoria.
