= Bill Turner (soccer) =

Australian association football referee and administrator

- Born: 7 May 1929; New South Wales, Australia
- Died: 22 February 2013 (aged 83); Lake Macquarie, New South Wales, Australia
- Occupations: School teacher, Soccer administrator

Bill Turner (1929 – 2013) was an Australian soccer referee and sports administrator. He was the founder of the Bill Turner Cup and Bill Turner Trophy, which has become one of the largest school sports knockout competitions in the world.

== Early life and career ==
Turner grew up in New South Wales and became involved in local soccer around the Newcastle and Lake Macquarie.

He was referee up to international level - his career ending in 1994 due to ill health.

After completing a teaching degree, Turner worked as a schoolteacher at Booragul High School for 29 years (later renamed Lake Macquarie High School).

== Football administration ==
In the late 1960s, Turner recognised a lack of structured pathways for young schoolboys to play soccer at regional and national levels. He began organising trials, which eventually expanded into inter-regional and interstate selection.

Turner was heavily involved in:

- School Sport Australia: He helped found the School Sport Australia Soccer program.
- International touring: He established the first international schoolboy touring programs for Australian soccer, providing elite experience to future national players including Craig Johnston.
- The Tasman Cup: He co-founded the Tasman Cup, a high-profile school soccer knockout tournament that later evolved into the Commonwealth Bank Cup.

== The Bill Turner Cup and Trophy ==
In 1979, Turner established the Northern NSW Schools Soccer Association to run a knockout competition for school students aged 15 and under. The tournament launched with 34 schools from the Newcastle and Lake Macquarie areas.

During an early meeting that Turner was unable to attend, fellow committee members voted unanimously to name the competition the Bill Turner Cup in his honour.

The tournament experienced gradual expansion across the eastern states of Australia:

- 1981: Expanded to include schools from the rest of New South Wales.
- 1982: Incorporated teams from the Australian Capital Territory (ACT).
- 1987–1988: Expanded into Queensland and Victoria.
- 1991: Launched a sister tournament for girls, later named the Bill Turner Trophy.

By 2025, over 400 schools and around 6,000 students participate annually.

Tournament alumni include Tim Cahill, Mark Schwarzer, Caitlin Foord, and Alanna Kennedy.

== Recognition ==
- 1999 - Awarded life membership from the NSW Combined High Schools Sports Association.
- 2001 - Induction into the Football Australia Hall of Fame

== Death ==
Turner died at the age of 83 on 22 February 2013.

== See also ==
- Football Australia Hall of Fame
- Soccer in Australia
