= Ringwood City SC =

Ringwood City
- Full name: Ringwood City Soccer Club
- Nickname: Wilhelmina
- Founded: 1953
- Ground: Jubilee Park, Ringwood
- President: Robert Blyth
- League: Victorian State League 4 Men's - South-East
- 2026: 1st (promoted)
- Website: https://www.ringwoodcitysc.com.au/
Home colours	Away colours

Ringwood City Soccer Club is an Australian soccer club from Ringwood, a suburb of Melbourne. The club was formed in 1953 as Wilhelmina by Dutch Australians. The club currently competes in Victorian State League 4 Men's - South-East, the seventh tier of Victoria football, where it has been since 2014.

== History ==
=== Early history ===
Wilhelmina D.S.C. (Dutch Soccer Club) entered the Fourth Division Reserves competition in 1953, wearing all-orange kits and playing on a paddock in North Balwyn, its home for three years. The club finished second despite having begun halfway through the season.

1954 saw the first official Wilhelmina senior side enter the Fourth Division competition. The side had many players who had played in higher divisions and won the league with ease, earning promotion to Division Three.

The following season, Wilhelmina earned promotion again with a perfect season of 18 consecutive wins. Wilhelmina relocated to Burnley Oval in Richmond in 1956. In 1956, the club won the Second Division and earned promotion to the first division. It took the club only four years to get promoted into the Victorian State League, losing only one game of the 54 played.

In 1957, Wilhelmina moved to McDonald Reserve in Hawthorn for its first season in the State League. The season ended with a fifth-place finish. The following season, Wilhelmina won the Dockerty Cup.

In 1966 they were relegated, but the following year they were again promoted as Ringwood City Wilhelmina. After many more years of an up-and-down State League campaign, they were relegated to Victorian State League Division 1 in 1990. This started the club's demise. After years of competition, the club found themselves relegated seven times, and found themselves in the lowest men's Victorian league, Metropolitan League South East.

=== Recent years ===
In 2009 Ringwood City defeated St. Kevins Old Boys 3–0 in the final round of the 2009 FFV Metropolitan South East division to gain their first championship in 12 years.

In 2013, Ringwood City won the State League Division 5 East championship, with Nicholas Theodore taking out the league Golden Boot, scoring 27 goals.

== Honours ==
- Victorian State League Champions 1959
- Victorian State League Runner-Up 1958
- Victorian State League Division 1 Champions 1956, 1967
- Victorian State League Division 2 Champions 1955, 1997
- Victorian League Division 4 Champions 1954
- Victorian State League Division 5 East Champions 2013
- Victorian Metropolitan League SE Champions 2009
- Dockerty Cup Winners 1958
- State League Cup Winners 1961
- AMPOL Pre Season Cup Winners 1962
- B.I.S.C. Winners 2002

=== Women's Teams ===
- 2000 – Women's Victorian Premier League Champions
- 2018 – Women's State League 3 East Champions
- 2019 – Women's State League 2 South East Runners-up
- 2022 – Women's State League 1 South East Champions

== Notable players ==
- Bobby Collins
- Brian Edgley
- Dick van Alphen
- Frans van Balkom
- Freddie Bunce
- Gary Cole
- George Campbell
- Jackson Irvine
- Ollie Norris
- Peter Aldis
- Peter Ollerton
- Selin Kuralay
- Sjel de Bruyckere
- Willem de Graaf
- Shaun Parton

== Competition timeline ==
Season	League										Dockerty Cup State Cup	Top scorer	
Season	Division	Pld	W	D	L	GF	GA	+/-	Pts	Position	Dockerty Cup State Cup	Player(s)	Goals
1954 (P)	Metro DIV 4									1st			
1955 (P)	Metro DIV 3	18	18	0	0	114	10	104	36	1st	SF (2-4 Polomia)		
1956 (P)	Metro DIV 2	18	16	2	0	82	24	58	34	1st	SF (2-4 Polomia)		
1957	Metro Div 1	18	8	2	8	50	36	14	18	6th	QF(2-3 Footscray)		
1958	State League	22	13	5	4	78	24	54	31	2nd	Won (3-0 Juv)		
1959	State League	22	17	2	3	86	40	46	36	1st	SF(1-3 Hakoah)		
1960	State League	22	10	4	8	50	38	12	24	4th	R5 (2-3preston)		
1961	State League	22	13	4	5	49	29	20	30	3rd	SF(0-1 polonia)		
1962	State League	22	11	8	3	54	28	26	30	3rd	R1(0-1 croat)		
1963	State League	22	10	2	10	44	40	4	22	5th	R2(0-0- hungaria)		
1964	State League	22	8	4	10	40	48	-8	20	8th	QF(0-3 port melb)		
1965	State League	22	6	6	10	31	43	-12	18	9th	R5 (2-2 Footscray)		
1966 (R)	State League	22	7	2	13	33	46	-13	16	12th	R5 (2-1 Juv)		
1967 (P)	Metro Div 1	22	18	1	3	83	16	67	37	1st			
1968	State League	22	8	6	8	26	24	2	22	7th			
1969	State League	22	13	4	5	45	21	24	30	3rd			
1970	State League	22	9	6	7	43	28	15	24	6th	QF (1-3 keilor)		
1971	State League	22	10	4	8	40	28	12	24	5th	QF (0-3 Footscray)		
1972	State League	22	7	3	12	35	44	-9	17	8th	R16 (0-3 melbourne)		
1973	State League	22	8	7	7	41	26	15	23	7th	QF(0-1 melbourne)		
1974	State League	22	7	5	10	31	34	-3	19	7th	RU (4-1 South Melb)		
1975	State League	22	6	3	13	25	41	-16	15	11			
1976	State League	22	4	9	9	27	35	-8	17	9			
1977	State League	22	8	4	10	24	37	-13	20	8	RU (3-1 George Cross)		
1978 (R)	State League	22	3	6	13	21	42	-21	12	12	Ampol cup (2 wins, 2 loss)		
1979	Metro Div 1	22	12	4	6	42	27	15	28	4	R16 (1-3 Essendon)		
1980 (P)	Metro Div 1	22	15	1	6	37	17	20	31	2nd	R16 (2-3 Western suburbs)		
1981	State League	22	8	4	10	32	42	-10	20	6	QF(2-3 Altona)		
1982	State League	26	6	7	13	33	51	-18	19	11			
1983	State League	26	6	2	18	24	58	-34	14	13			
1984	State League	26	9	7	10	42	39	3	25	7			
1985	State League	26	7	6	13	26	38	20	18	11			
1986 (R)	State League	26	5	7	14	19	49	17	32	13			
1987 (P)	State league Div 1	26	19	3	4	51	14	41	-27	2nd			
1988	State League	30	12	7	11	49	41	31	10	7th			
1989	State League	30	7	8	15	26	52	22	30	13			
1990 (R)	State League	34	6	6	22	40	70	18	52	16			
1991	State league Div 1	28	5	13	10	26	35	23	12	10			
1992	State league Div 1	26	6	6	14	27	45	18	27	12			
1993	State league Div 1	26	9	6	11	39	40	24	16	8			
1994 (R)	State league Div 1	26	5	7	14	34	56	17	39	14			
1995 (R)	State league Div 2	26	6	5	15	28	46	23	23	13			
1996 (P)	State league Div 3	26	17	5	4	73	26	56	-30	2nd			
1997 (P)	State league Div 2	26	19	3	4	49	18	60	-42	1st			
1998 (R)	State league Div 1	26	5	5	16	33	64	20	44	13			
1999	State league Div 2	26	6	6	14	33	59	24	35	12			
2000 (R)	State league Div 2 S/E	22	2	2	18	15	71	5	66	12			
2001	State league Div 3 S/E	22	9	3	10	33	37	30	7	6			
2002	State league Div 3 S/E	22	10	4	8	45	43	34	9	4			
2003 (R)	State league Div 3 S/E	22	5	5	12	24	44	20	24	11			
2004 (R)	Prov Div 1 S/E	22	2	4	16	23	65	10	55	11			
2005 (R)	Prov Div 2 S/E	22	6	6	10	23	35	24	11	11	Not played		
2006	Prov Div 3 S/E	22	7	8	7	38	34	29	5	7th	Not played		
2007 (R)	Prov Div 3 S/E	20	3	5	12	19	59	14	45	10	Not played		
2008	Metro	22	8	5	9	39	31	26	5	6	Not played		
2009	Metro S/E	18	13	2	3	45	23	41	-18	1st	Not played		
2010	Metro S/E	20	8	4	8	36	43	27	16	5	Not played		
2011	Metro S/E	22	11	4	7	52	42	37	5	6	R1 (1-3 Monash)		
2012	Prov 3	22	4	5	13	39	62	-23	14	11th	R1 (0-1 eastern lions)	N Theodore	11
2013 (P)	SL5	21	15	1	5	55	27	28	46	1st	R1 (1-2 Boorondara)	N Theodore	27
2014	SL4	22	12	2	8	46	37	9	38	4th	R1 (0-3 Melton)	J Oxley	8
2015	SL4	22	10	5	7	54	38	16	35	5th		K Roden	16
2016	SL4	22	9	5	8	33	29	4	32	5th	R1 (3-4 Springhills)	O Bridgford	17
2017	SL4	20	8	6	6	30	24	6	30	6th	R2 (0-1 Boorondara)	J Adeosun	7
2018	SL4	21	6	5	10	39	58	-19	23	7th	R5 (0-7 Sydenham)	I Sankoh	12
2019	SL4	22	6	3	13	31	46	-15	21	9th	R1 (0-1 Ashburton)	W Ong	6
2020	SL4	0	0	0	0	0	0	0	0	NA	NA	NA	NA
2021	SL4	14	6	2	6	24	24	0	20	6th	R4 (0-4 Casey comets)	M T Mamo	5
2022	SL4	22	11	2	9	49	38	11	35	6th	R2 (2-4 Monash)	D Primerano	16
2023	SL4	18	7	1	10	35	41	-6	25	6th	R4 (0-3 Moorolbark)	A Krstic	9
2024	SL4	22	8	3	11	44	43	1	27	9th	R1 (1-3 Diamond Valley United)	M Cintolo & M Murphy	7
2025	SL4	22	15	5	2	53	19	34	50	2nd	R4 (0-3 Oakleigh Cannons FC)	K Mcgeachy	8
