= Albert "Pompey" Austin =

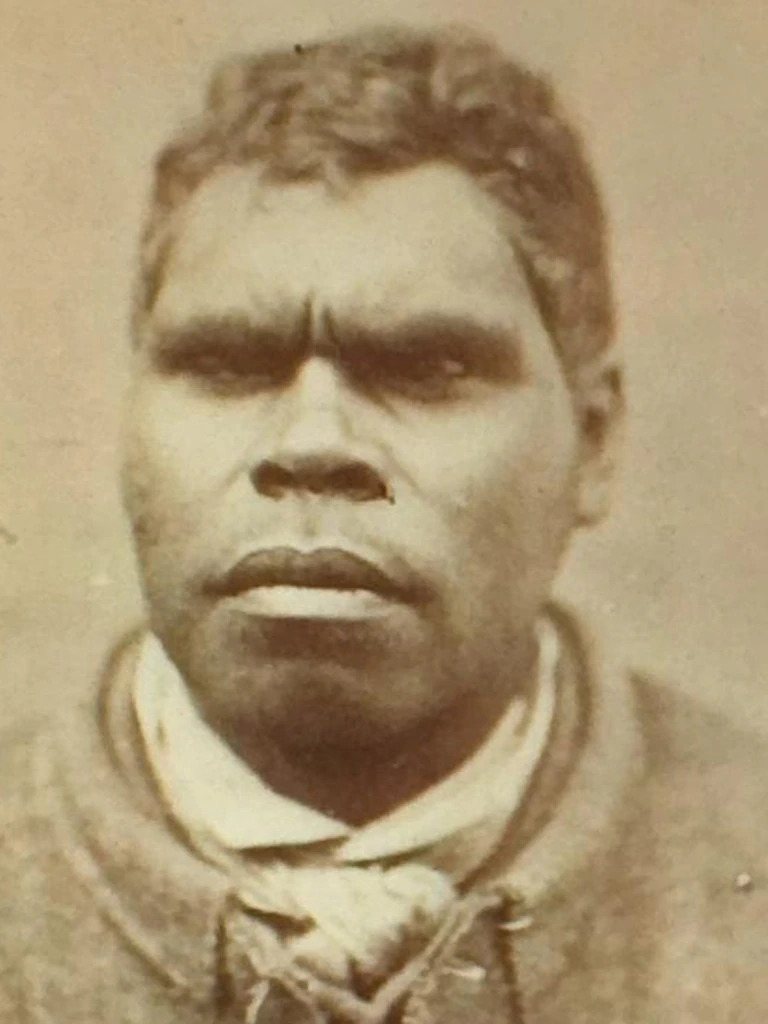
- A portrait of Austin in 1880

Personal information
- Full name: Poorne Yarriworri
- Nickname: Pompey
- Born: c. 1844; Camperdown, Victoria
- Died: 1889 (aged 44–45); Melbourne, Victoria

Playing career^{1}
Years	Club	Games (Goals)
1872	Geelong	1 (0)
- ^{1} Playing statistics correct to the end of 1872.

Albert "Pompey" Austin (born Poorne Yarriworri; c. 1844–1889) was an Australian athlete, tracker, entertainer and sportsman. Austin is recognised as the first Indigenous Australian to play senior Australian rules football in Victoria, when he played a single game for the Geelong Football Club in 1872.

== Early life ==
Austin was born in the mid-1840s near Camperdown in Victoria. A Djab Wurrung man, he lived at the Framlingham mission near Warrnambool.

== Sporting career ==
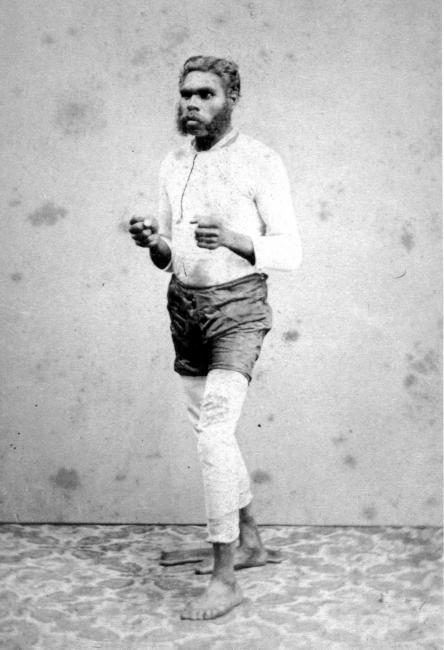
Austin in a boxing pose in 1868.

Austin was well known for his athletic ability, adept in numerous track and field events as well as Australian rules football, cricket, and possibly boxing and horse racing. In 1869, he won the high jump, pole vault and 220-yard hurdles at the Warrnambool Cricket Club annual sports day. Arguably his greatest feat was winning the Geelong Friendly Societies’ Gift at Easter time in 1872, walking away with a £10 prize. Austin played one game for Geelong against Carlton on 25 May 1872. A year later, at the Belfast Athletic Sports meet, Austin won the handicap hurdles, steeplechase, and 880-yard Christmas handicap. His prize was the equivalent of 11 weeks' wages.

Despite being "poleaxed" in his one and only game for Geelong, Austin would in years later return to the football field for various clubs in the Western District, including Framlingham, Cobden, and Albion Imperial.

== Professional career ==
Austin worked in the Kimberley region of Western Australia with explorer William J. O'Donnell, leading gold seekers from Wyndham to the emerging goldfields at Halls Creek. Australian novelist Mary Durack recorded that gold seekers heading to Halls Creek told of O'Donnell, William Carr Boyd and "that flash ... Pompey" leading them through the rugged country from Wyndham for "a pound a head". A landmark near Halls Creek, a rocky outcrop known as Pompey's Pillar, is named after Austin.

== Personal life ==
Austin married Rosanna Francis in 1867. They had five children together. Austin died of tuberculosis in a Melbourne hospital in 1889.

== Legacy ==
Austin's recognition was increased in the early 21st century when multiple media outlets ran news outlets highlighting his story as the first Indigenous Australian to play Australian rules football for a recognised club. Austin's short-lived career occurred more than three decades before the more highly publicised Joe Johnson, the first Indigenous Australian to compete in the Victorian Football League. Geelong would not have another Indigenous Australian represent the club until Polly Farmer debuted in 1962, almost 90 years after Austin's solitary match.

Historian Roy Hay published the first biography of Austin, Albert 'Pompey' Austin: A man between two worlds, in 2020.

Austin was posthumously inducted into the Victorian Aboriginal Honour Roll by the Victorian Government in October 2022.
