= Balkcom =

Balkcom is a surname. Notable people with the surname include:

- Jennifer Balkcom (fl. from 2023), American politician
- Ralph J. Balkcom (1921–2006), American politician

== See also ==
- Van Balkom, another surname
