= Andrew Dettre =

Australian journalist (1926–2018)

- Born: 1926; Hungary
- Died: June 25, 2018 (aged 91–92); Australia
- Occupations: Soccer journalist, newspaper editor, government advisor
- Awards: Football Australia Hall of Fame (2018)

Andrew Dettre (1926 – 25 June 2018) was an Australian soccer journalist.

Dettre was born in Hungary. He later left Hungary in 1948 after Communist authorities shut down the newspaper he was working at as a junior reporter.

From an Italian refugee camp in Naples he was transported to Australia in December 1948 on the US Army transport ship the General WM Black at the age of 22.

He spent time in a Bathurst migrant camp, before working as a journalist for The National Advocate in Bathurst and later the Daily Telegraph in Sydney.

In 1963, he became editor of Soccer World, a national soccer newspaper. He contributed to Soccer World as Paul Dean as he was still a feature writer for the Daily Telegraph. He later used the pseudonym Mike Renwick while writing for Soccer World when he was working as an adviser to Frank Stewart, a minister in the Whitlam government.

In 1975, while press secretary, Dettre proposed creating a national sports institute. He served on the study group that toured European athletic facilities and produced a parliamentary report that was the foundation for the Australian Institute of Sport.

Dettre authored a number of football related books including:

- Soccer the Australian Way (1977) – Co-authored with Johnny Warren
- How to Play Winning Soccer (1978)
- Soccer for Junior Socceroos (1981)
- Complete book of Soccer (1981)

== Recognition ==
In 2018, he was inducted into the Football Australia Hall of Fame for his contributions to football.

== Personal life ==
He had a son Steve and daughter Anne.

Dettre died in 2018.
