= Bob Telfer =

Australian soccer player, referee, coach, and administrator

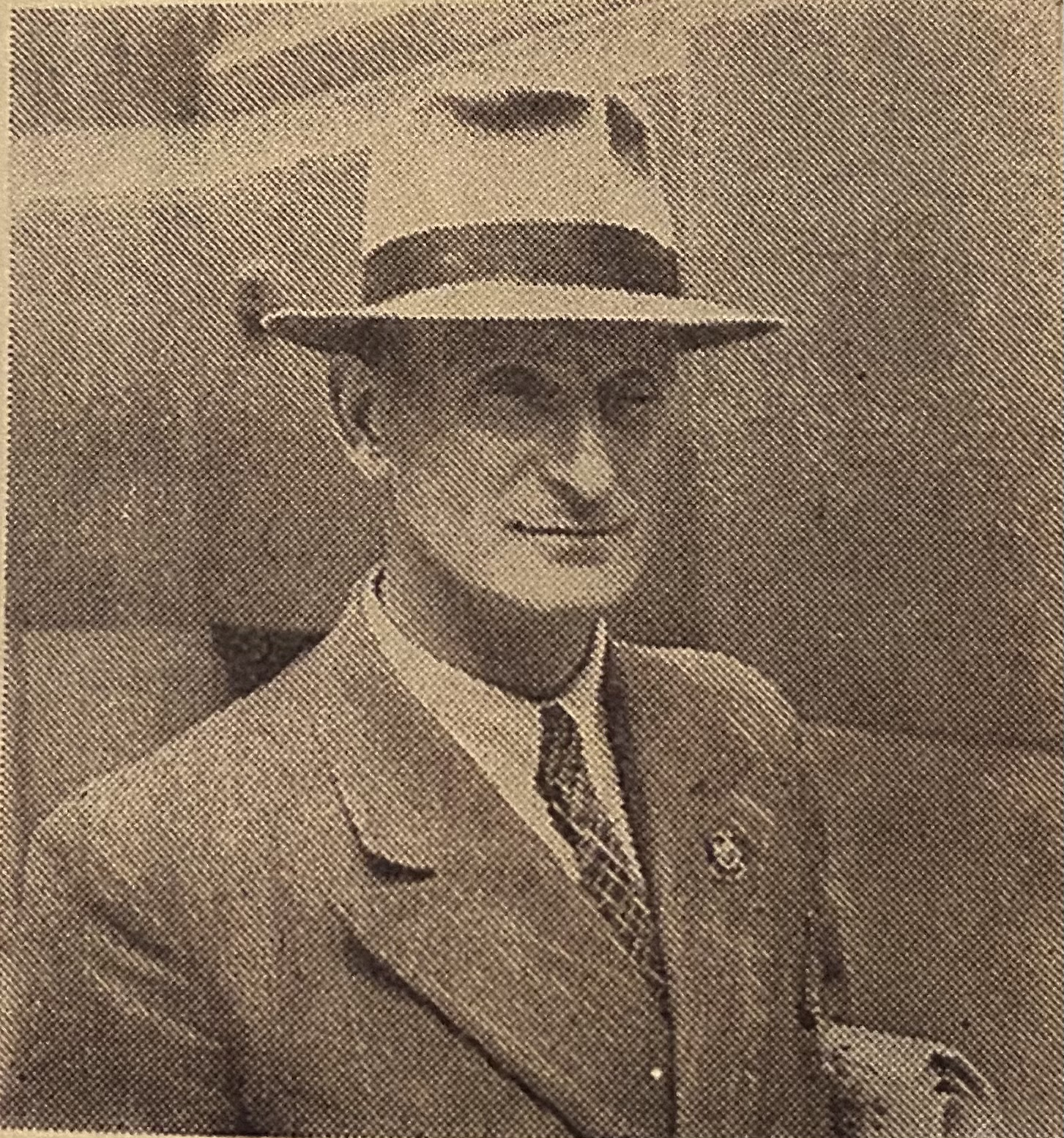

Personal information
- Full name: Robert Telfer
- Date of birth: 24 September 1904
- Place of birth: Wishaw, Scotland
- Date of death: 2 January 1984
- Positions: Centre back; full back; half back

Senior career*
Years	Team	Apps	(Gls)
1920-1922	Overtown Rangers		
1923-1927	Wishaw F.C.		
1928-1941	Kingswood	83*	(28*)

Managerial career
- 1929-1939: Kingswood
- Australia national soccer team
- * Club domestic league appearances and goals

Robert Telfer (24 September 1904 - 2 January 1981) was an Australian professional football player, referee, manager, administrator, soccer writer and editor.

== Early life ==
Robert 'Bob' Telfer was born in Wishaw, Scotland and grew up in Wishaw/Hamilton. He was the second of three children, having two sisters Mary and Jean, fathered by John Currie Telfer, a bricklayer employed by the United Colleries Co., Quarter, Lanarkshire. His mother was Mary Storie Telfer (McDonald). As a child, Telfer suffered from an eye complaint (cornea ulcer) and at one stage for a short period, was completely blind, having to be taken to the eye infirmary in Glasgow which left his left eye permanently damaged. Telfer attended the Low Waters Primary School until the age of 12 where he then attended three years at St. Johns High School. Upon leaving high school, Telfer was employed as an electrical apprentice by the firm of Anderson, Boyes & Co. Ltd. Electrical Mining and Mechanical Engineers, Motherwell.

Being an ardent football enthusiast, Telfer played football for his school teams and on leaving school, joined the Hamilton Y.M.C.A team, being the youngest player in the team.

In 1920, Telfer joined the Overtown Rangers where he played 3 seasons before joining Wishaw in 1923. At that time, Wishaw was one of the best junior clubs in Scotland. Between 1923 and 1927, Telfer was part of a successful team which won multiple awards including the Lanarkeshire League Championship, League Cup, Central and Challenge Cups.

Upon completion of his apprenticeship, Telfer joined the United Colleries Co. Ltd. where he remained until the 1926 coal strike which the developed into the great General Strike of all workers throughout Great Britain. As a result of being unable to obtain regular payments, Telfer decided to try his luck and move to Australia.

== Club career ==
Arriving in Australia in November 1927, during the depression, Telfer was unable to secure regular employment until February 1928 from the Municipal Tramways Trust as an electrical fitter. Employment to commence in Adelaide, Telfer contacted a friend who had also been employed by both his previous employer and now M.T.T. and sent him a photograph of his Wishaw Team. Upon arriving in Adelaide, officials from Kingswood Club met with Telfer and he agreed to play for Kingswood. A few days later, Telfer was approached by officials from the East Torrens Club and was advised that the Kingswood Club was part of a break-away league which was not recognised by the controlling body of soccer in South Australia.

Telfer advised East Torrens Club he was to choose where he would be playing and would not be 'zoned' to a club and elected to play for Kingswood. On the opening match day of the 1928 season, Telfer's name was published in the press for both the Kingswood Club and East Torrens Club. Telfer played for Kingswood and as a result, was suspended for life by the controlling body (as were all other players participating in the break-away league). Within two years, all suspensions were lifted and the 'District System' was abolished.

In Telfer's inaugural season (1928) with Kingswood, he was named captain where he went on to play 17 games (9 wins, 2 draws, 6 losses), scoring six goals. Telfer was awarded the 'Patron's Medal' for most consistent player. In season 2 (1929), Telfer became Playing Manager as well as retaining the captaincy. Kingswood was placed into Division 2 of a three division league where he would go on to lead the team to a 6 win, 1 draw and 7 loss season in which he played 15 games and scored eight goals.

== Honours ==
Telfer was inducted as a member of the Australian Football Hall of Fame in 1999. He became a member of the Football Federation of South Australia Hall of Fame in 2003.
