= Bill Henderson (soccer) =

Australian soccer player

Bill Henderson OAM
Personal information
- Full name: William Henderson
- Date of birth: 23 November 1929 (age 96)
- Position: Goalkeeper

Senior career*
Years	Team	Apps	(Gls)
1942-1946	Granville Waratah		
1947	Granville Kewpies		
1948-1956	Granville Magpies		
1957–1960	Auburn		

International career
1954–1956	Australia		
- * Club domestic league appearances and goals

Bill Henderson (born 23 November 1929) is an Australian former soccer player who played as a goalkeeper.

With his debut for Australia in 1954, he became the second second-generation Socceroo—his father Andy Henderson had represented the national team in 1924. Henderson was a member of the Australian team at the 1956 Summer Olympics. Henderson was inducted into the Soccer Australia Hall of Fame in 1999.
