= Sjel de Bruyckere =

Dutch footballer (1928–2011)

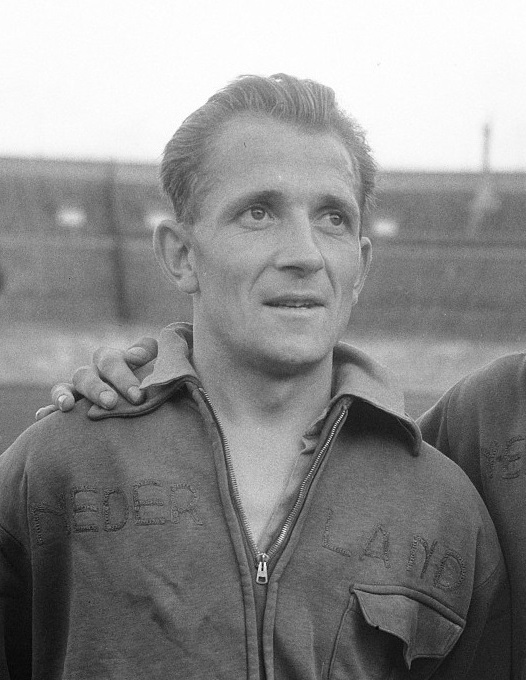

Personal information
- Full name: Michaël Christinus de Bruyckere
- Date of birth: 6 February 1928
- Place of birth: Kaatsheuvel, Netherlands
- Date of death: 20 September 2011 (aged 83)
- Position: Forward

Senior career*
Years	Team	Apps	(Gls)
1950–1956	Willem II	167	(80)
1956–?	Wilhelmina		
- Melbourne Hungaria

International career
1954–1956	Netherlands	7	(2)

Managerial career
- Wilhelmina
- Ringwood United
- Lions
- Polonia
- George Cross
- Preston Makedonia
- * Club domestic league appearances and goals

Michaël "Sjel" de Bruyckere (6 February 1928 – 20 September 2011) was a Dutch footballer who played as a forward for Willem II and the Netherlands national team before emigrating to Australia. Known in Australia as Mike de Bruyckere, he played for Wilhemina and played two unofficial matches for the Australia national soccer team.

== Club career ==
In 1950, de Bruyckere joined Willem II, where he played in the team's 1952 and 1955 national championship teams. After Willem II rejected a transfer to Lugano in 1956, de Bruyckere left for Australia, signing for Wilhelmina, a team founded by Dutch immigrants to Australia. Later in 1956, the Royal Dutch Football Association wrote to the Australian Soccer Football Association, requesting that a transfer fee be paid to Willem II.

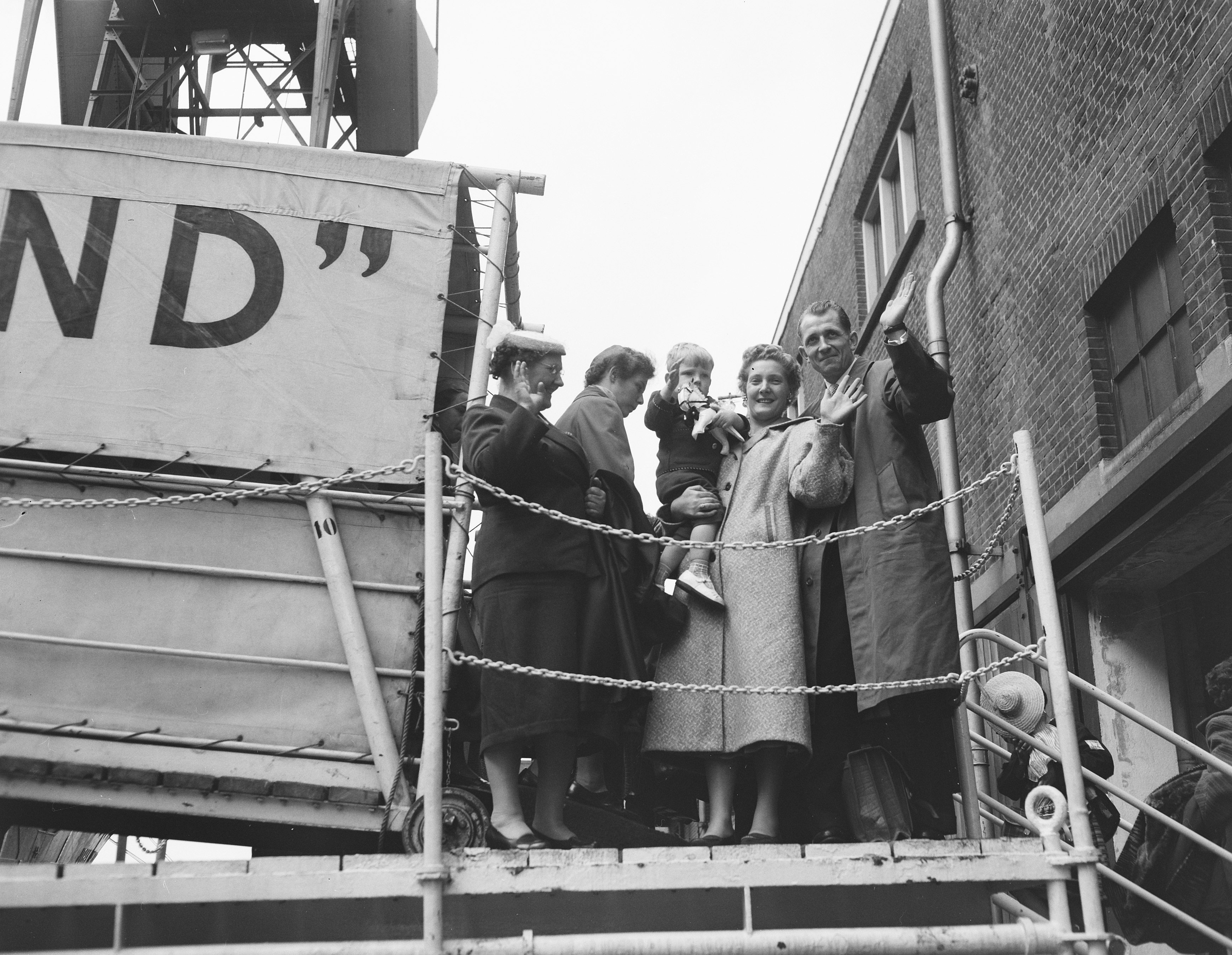
Sjel de Bruyckere (right) with his wife and son leaving Amsterdam in April 1956

== International career ==
De Bruyckere made his debut for the Netherlands national football team against Belgium in October 1954. He played his seventh and last appearance at international level in April 1956, also against Belgium.

In 1957, de Bruyckere played for Australian selections against visiting club teams Eastern AA and Ferencváros.

== Personal life ==
De Bruyckere died in Australia in 2011. His ashes were partly scattered over the pitch of his beloved Willem II in Tilburg.

== Honours ==
Willem II

- Netherlands Football League Championship: 1951–52, 1953–54

Wilhelmina

- Victorian State League Division 2 Champions: 1956
- Victorian State League Division 1 Champions: 1959
- Dockerty Cup: 1958

Individual

- Football Federation Australia Hall of Fame: 1999
