= Jim Bayutti =

Jim Bayutti AO OMRI (1924–1991) was an Italian-Australian engineer, sports administrator, and business leader.

== Early life ==
Bayutti was born in Italy in 1924 and emigrated to Australia in 1949. In Australia, he worked as an engineer on the Snowy Mountains Scheme.

== Sporting administration ==
In 1954, Bayutti was founding president of Associazione Poli-sportiva Italo Australiana (APIA), an Italian-Australian sports club. While APIA was a multi-sport club, the soccer section became the most well known section.

Bayutti was a vice president of the Australian Soccer Federation and president of the NSW Soccer Federation during the 1960s.

== Business ==
Bayutti founded Bayutti Contractors, a civil engineering company based in Sydney.

During the 1970s, Bayutti spent five years as a member of the Qantas board. Bayutti was named chairman of the New South Wales Urban Transit Authority in 1980.

== Honours ==
In 1970, he became a life member of the Australian Soccer Federation. Bayutti was made an Officer of the Order of Australia in the 1975 Queen's Birthday Honours. In 1981, Bayutti became a Grand Officer of the Order of Merit of the Italian Republic. Bayutti was an inaugural inductee in 1999 into the Australian Soccer Hall of Fame (now the Football Australia Hall of Fame).
