= Atlanta day trading firm shootings =

Shooting spree in metro Atlanta, Georgia, U.S.

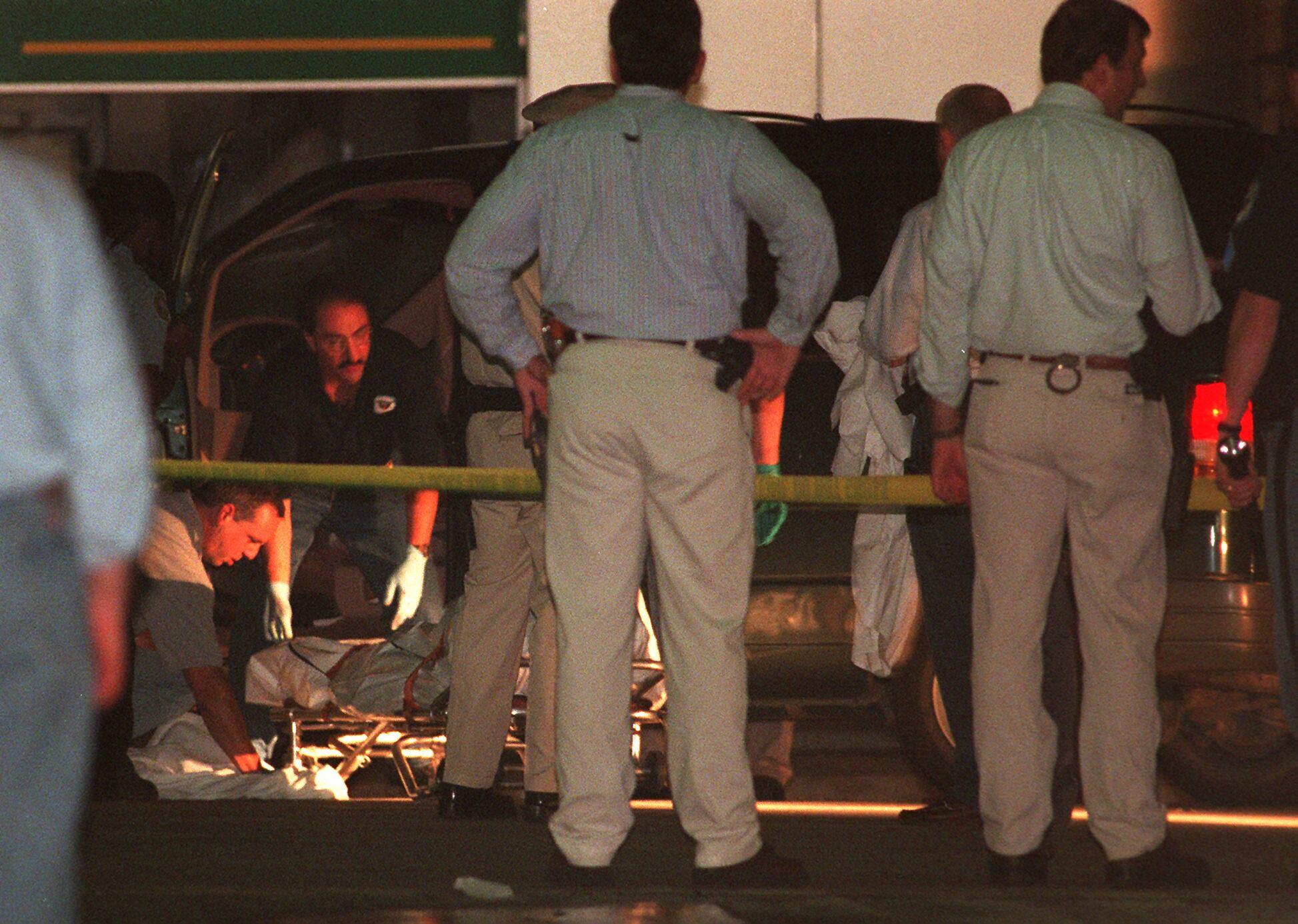
- Law enforcement officials remove Mark Barton's body from his van after he committed suicide following the shootings
- Location: Stockbridge and Atlanta, Georgia, U.S.
- Date: 29, 1999; 3:00 p.m. – 3:15 p.m. EST
- Target: Day traders
- Attack type: Spree shooting; murder–suicide
- Weapons: .45 caliber Colt 1911A1 handgun; 9mm Glock 17 semi-automatic pistol; .22 caliber H&R revolver (unused); .25 caliber Raven MP-25 (unused)
- Deaths: 10 (including the perpetrator) (Note: The three home victims are excluded from this toll because they were killed in a separate domestic incident two days prior, and are unrelated preceding events to the brokerage attacks.)
- Injuries: 13
- Perpetrator: Mark Orrin Barton
- Motive: Mental deterioration over financial ruin

On July 29, 1999, a mass shooting occurred when a gunman, later identified as 44-year-old Mark Orrin Barton, fatally shot nine people and wounded 13 others. Barton's shooting spree is the deadliest mass shooting in Georgia's history.

Barton fired a total of 39 rounds during the spree, which occurred at two Atlanta-area day trading firms, Momentum Securities and the All-Tech Investment Group. He later committed suicide before he could be apprehended by police. Police searching Barton's home in nearby Stockbridge found the bodies of his second wife and the two children from his first marriage, whom were fatally struck by hammer blows inflicted before the shooting spree started. According to a note left at the scene by Barton, his wife was killed on July 27, while the children were killed on the following day. Barton was believed to be motivated by large financial losses incurred during the previous two months.

== Events ==
=== Stockbridge home murders ===
On July 27, 1999, Mark Orrin Barton woke up early in the morning at his home in Stockbridge, Georgia, and bludgeoned his second wife, Leigh Ann Vandiver, to death as she slept. The next night, he also beat his children from his first marriage, Matthew and Mychelle, to death. He covered them with blankets and left notes on their bodies, reading in part:

I killed Leigh Ann because she was one of the main reasons for my demise. ... I know that Jehovah will take care of all of them in the next life. I'm sure the details don't matter. There is no excuse, no good reason I am sure no one will understand. If they could I wouldn't want them to. I just write these things to say why. Please know that I love Leigh Ann, Matthew and Mychelle with all my heart. If Jehovah's willing I would like to see them all again in the resurrection to have a second chance. I don't plan to live very much longer, just long enough to kill as many of the people that greedily sought my destruction.

=== Atlanta shootings ===
On July 29, Barton went to the offices of his former employer, Momentum Securities, in Atlanta. Witnesses say that Barton briefly chatted with coworkers and said "I hope this doesn't ruin your trading day!" before suddenly drawing two pistols and opening fire. He shot and killed four people and attempted to execute Brad Schoemehl, who was shot three times at point-blank range. Barton then walked to the nearby All-Tech Investment Group building, where he lured Brent Doonan and Scott Manspeaker, his former bosses, into a private room with assistant Kathy Camp, telling them "I've got something you're going to want to see." He opened fire, wounding all three, with Doonan being shot five times and Camp being left blind. He then left the private room and murdered an additional five victims. Barton left the scene before police could arrive, having fired a combined total of 39 shots at the two locations. The police searched his house and found the bodies of his family and the notes that he had left with them, in which Barton vehemently denied responsibility for the deaths of his first wife and mother-in-law.

An intense manhunt ensued. Four hours after the All-Tech Investment Group shooting, Barton accosted and threatened a young girl in Kennesaw, apparently attempting to secure a hostage for his escape. The young girl escaped and called police. Responding police officers spotted Barton in his minivan and a chase ensued, culminating at a gas station in Acworth, Georgia. As law enforcement attempted to apprehend him, Barton shot and killed himself.

== Perpetrator ==
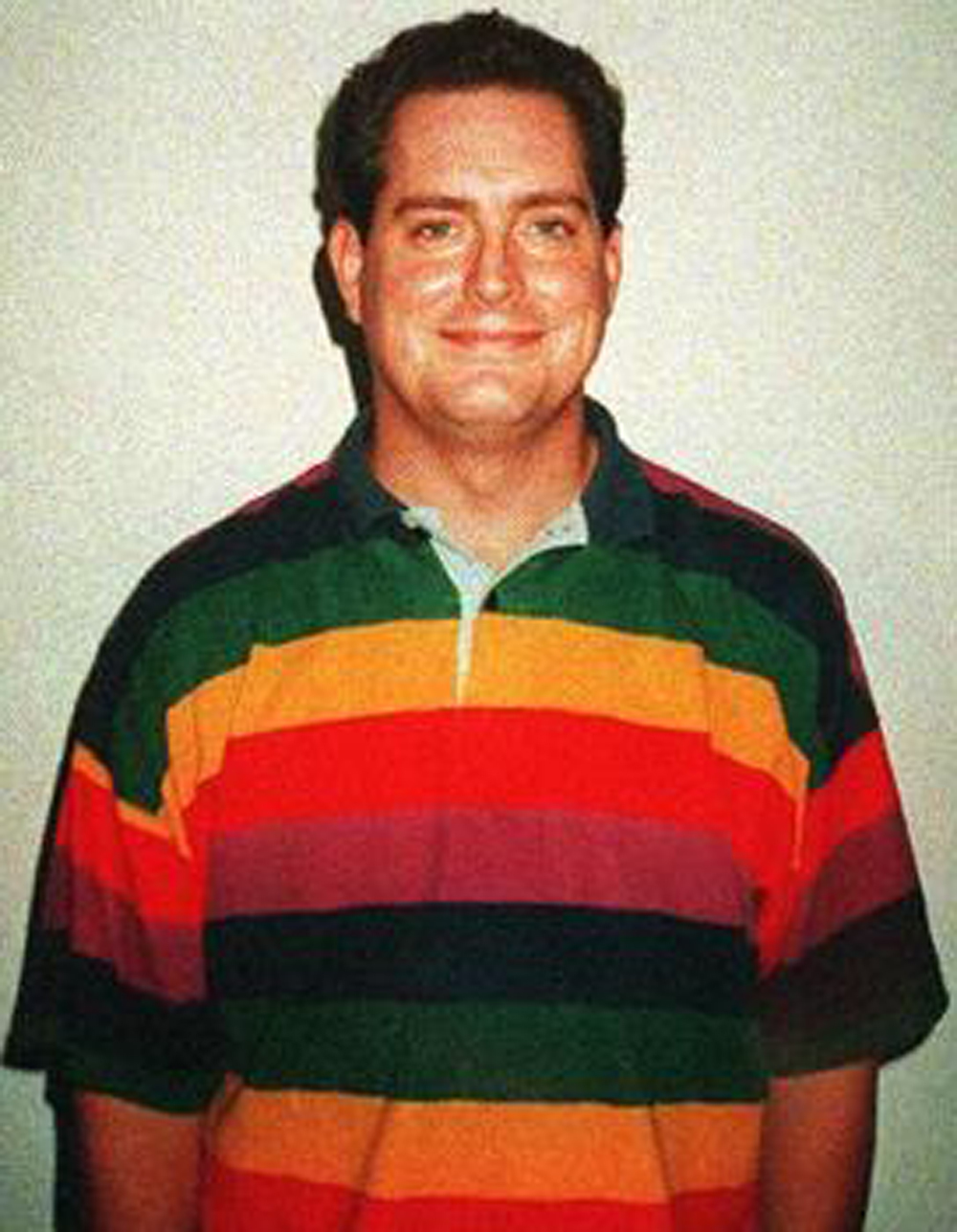
Undated police photograph of Barton

Mark Orrin Barton (April 2, 1955 – July 29, 1999) was born in Stockbridge, Georgia, to an Air Force family and was raised in South Carolina. He attended Clemson University and the University of South Carolina. Back in Atlanta, Barton married Debra Spivey, with whom he had two children.

Barton's family moved to Alabama as his employer required him there. Barton grew paranoid and started distrusting his wife. He lost his employment after his performance plummeted. He was also caught sabotaging data of the company that had fired him and served a short jail term for this retaliatory act. Barton found a new employer in Georgia and a mistress in one of his wife's acquaintances, with whom he had an affair. On September 5, 1993, Spivey and her mother Eloise were killed by bludgeoning. Barton was the prime suspect in the double homicide, but he was not charged due to a lack of evidence. He always denied having had any part in them, including in the note that he left behind with the bodies of Leigh Ann Vandiver and his children in 1999. Despite his denials, authorities still consider Barton a suspect in the 1993 murders.

Barton had received a $294,000 insurance settlement from his first wife's death and used the funds to finance his day trading career, preferring high-risk Internet-related stocks. He married Vandiver, his former mistress, in 1995. His mental health continued to deteriorate, eventually progressing into severe depression with comorbid paranoid delusions. In the month prior to his killing spree, Barton had lost $105,000 (modern day $202,931), with his account cancelled by Momentum Securities.

== Victims ==
The following is a list of those killed:

- Leigh Ann Vandiver Barton, 27, wife of Mark Barton
- Matthew David Barton, 11, son of Mark Barton
- Mychelle Elizabeth Barton, 8, daughter of Mark Barton
- Allen Charles Tenenbaum, 48, day trader at All-Tech Investment Group
- Dean Delawalla, 52, day trader at All-Tech Investment Group
- Joseph J. Dessert, 60, day trader at All-Tech Investment Group
- Jamshid Havash, 45, day trader at All-Tech Investment Group
- Vadewattee Muralidhara, 44, a computer course student at All-Tech Investment Group
- Edward Quinn, 58, day trader at Momentum Securities
- Kevin Dial, 36, office manager at Momentum Securities
- Russell J. Brown, 42, day trader at Momentum Securities
- Scott A. Webb, 30, day trader at Momentum Securities
