= Frans van Balkom =

Dutch football manager (1939–2015)

Personal information
- Date of birth: 23 October 1939
- Place of birth: Kerkrade, Limburg, Netherlands
- Date of death: 2 September 2015 (aged 75)
- Place of death: Schin op Geul, Limburg, Netherlands

Senior career*
Years	Team	Apps	(Gls)
1961-1969	Ringwood City		

Managerial career
- 1973–1975: Yomiuri Verdy
- 1976–1977: Hong Kong
- 1978–1979: Indonesia
- 1979-1980: NIAC Mitra Surabaya
- 1981: Tung Sing
- 1982: Ryoden Mitsubishi
- 1984: Al-Nahda
- 1995–1998: Albirex Niigata
- * Club domestic league appearances and goals

Frans van Balkom (23 October 1939 – 2 September 2015) was a Dutch football player and manager.

== Playing career ==
As a player, van Balkom signed for Australian side Ringwood City.

== Managerial career ==
In 1973, he was appointed manager of Japanese side Tokyo Verdy. In 1976, van Balkom was appointed manager of Hong Kong. In 1980, he was appointed manager of Hong Kong. After that, he was appointed director of St. Louis Scott Gallagher in the United States. In 1995, van Balkom was appointed manager of Japanese club Albirex Niigata.
