= Roy Hay (writer) =

- Born: 1940 (age 85–86); Scotland
- Education: University of Glasgow, University of Oxford
- Occupations: Sports historian, author, journalist, academic
- Known for: Researching the history of soccer in Australia
- Awards: Football Australia Hall of Fame (2025)

Roy Hay is a Scottish-born Australian academic, sports writer, and historian based in Geelong, Victoria. He is widely regarded as one of Australia's foremost football (soccer) historians, dedicating over four decades to preserving the social and cultural history of the sport at all levels.

== Early life and education ==
The grandson of Jimmy Hay, Roy Hay was born in Scotland 1940. He graduated from the University of Glasgow and later the University of Oxford. He migrated to Australia in 1985, settling in the Geelong region of Victoria.

== Academic and journalistic career ==
Following his arrival in Australia, Hay worked as a lecturer at Deakin University at its Geelong campuses. Upon his retirement from full-time teaching, he was appointed an Honorary Fellow in the Faculty of Arts and Education within the School of Humanities and Social Sciences at Deakin.

Hay was a soccer writer for the Geelong Advertiser from 1991 to 2002.

As a journalist, sports writer, and commentator, Hay has written extensively in media and academic publications. He has been deeply involved in soccer throughout his life as a player, coach and club official.

== Football history and research ==
Hay's research focuses heavily on the intersections of sport, migration, and community identity. He has argued that the history of soccer is fundamentally the history of migration in Australia, serving as an essential bridge for new arrivals integrating into Australian society.

In 2008, Hay became an inaugural member of Football Victoria's Historical Committee, working toward the sharing and preservation of the state's football heritage. He served as the President of the Australian Society for Sports History (ASSH) and sat on Football Australia's Hall of Fame and History Committee.

Beyond association football, Hay has conducted significant historical research into the origins of Australian rules football, particularly the history and scale of 19th-century Indigenous Australian involvement in the sport.

== Recognition ==
In late 2025, Football Australia announced Hay's induction into the Football Australia Hall of Fame for his contribution to ensuring the game's history is recorded truthfully and comprehensively.

== Selected publications ==
- The World Game Downunder (2006, editor with Bill Murray)
- The Story of Football in Victoria (2009, with Ian Syson)
- A History of Football in Australia: A Game of Two Halves (2014, with Bill Murray)
- Games Goals Glory: Assessing Eleven Seasons of the A-League (2016)
- Aboriginal People and Australian Football in the Nineteenth Century: They Did Not Come from Nowhere (2019)
- Albert "Pompey" Austin: A Man Between Two Worlds (2020)
- Geelong Soccer between the Wars (2026)
- Geelong Soccer Since the War (2026)

== See also ==
- Soccer in Geelong
- Football Australia Hall of Fame
