= Cec Drummond =

Australian soccer player

Personal information
- Full name: Cec Drummond
- Date of birth: 1916
- Place of birth: Sydney, Australia
- Date of death: July 1975 (aged 58–59)
- Position: Full-back

Senior career*
Years	Team	Apps	(Gls)
1938–1939	Leichhardt-Annandale		
1940–1948	Metters		
1949–1950	Drummoyne		
1951–1952	Leichhardt-Annandale		

International career
1947–1950	Australia	14	(0)
- * Club domestic league appearances and goals

Cec Drummond (1916–1975) was an Australian professional soccer player who played as a full-back for the Australia national soccer team.

== Early life ==
Drummond was raised in Sydney.

== International career ==
Drummond played for the Australia national soccer team, and played 14 official matches, making his debut against South Africa and being captained four times.

== Career statistics ==
=== International ===
National team	Year	Competitive		Friendly		Total	
National team	Year	Apps	Goals	Apps	Goals	Apps	Goals
Australia	1947	0	0	5	0	5	0
Australia	1948	0	0	4	0	4	0
Australia	1950	0	0	5	0	5	0
