= Cindy Heydon =

Australian soccer player

Cindy Heydon (born 9 April 1961) is an Australian former soccer player who played as a midfielder and forward for the Australia women's national soccer team between 1978 and 1984.

== Club career ==
Heydon began playing senior football for St George-Budapest as a ten-year-old. She was a member of the Budapest team that was undefeated in the New South Wales Metropolitan Ladies Soccer Association between 1971 and 1979. Later in her career, she played for Arncliffe and Marconi. She played futsal in the late 1980s for Bankstown Tornadoes in the National Indoor Soccer League.

== International career ==
Heydon was a member of the Australian team that finished third at the 1975 AFC Women's Championship, though matches at this tournament are not considered to be full international matches by Football Federation Australia (FFA). Her first recognised national cap was in 1978, though she didn't play a full international until 1979 against New Zealand. She was the 1981 Matildas Captain NZ Tour - 4 matches 4 wins. Between 1978 and 1984, Heydon played 23 times for Australia, including 11 times in full international matches.

== Honours ==
Australia

- AFC Women's Championship third place: 1975

Individual

- Football Federation Australia Hall of Fame: 2002
- Football Federation Australia Women's Team of the Decade: 1979–89
