= Leigh Wardell =

Australian soccer player

Leigh Wardell is an Australian former soccer player who played for the Australia women's national soccer team between 1978 and 1988. Wardell was inducted into the Football Federation Australia Hall of Fame in May 2019.
