= Trixie Tagg =

Australian educator, soccer player, and coach

Trixie Tagg (née van Lieshout; born 13 December 1948 in Amsterdam) is an Australian retired educator, soccer player and soccer coach. She made a major contribution to Australian women's football.

== Biography ==
Born in Amsterdam, the Netherlands in 1948, she grew up in Amsterdam-West. She moved to Australia at the age of 13 years old. At the age of 19 years old, she became a member of a football team after replying to a newspaper advertisement in 1967. Tagg played for local club Sydney Prague and later St. George in Sydney. In 1975 she was selected for Australia's first international women's tournament, the women's 1975 AFC Women's Championship in Hong Kong; playing in former shirts of the men’s team. She was capped four times by the Matildas, all four in the 1975 AFC Women's Championship. Not at the time, but the team is now recognised as the first Australia women's national football team.

After her playing career she was one of a number of coaches of the Australia women's national football team between 1979 and 1989. She became the first women’s coach of the Matildas in 1981, and was the coach of Australia women's national football team for its 1981 tour of New Zealand. She has been inducted into the Football Australia Hall of Fame in 2007.
