= Joanne Millman =

Australian soccer player

Personal information
- Date of birth: 18 August 1961 (age 65)
- Positions: Sweeper; midfielder

Senior career*
Years	Team	Apps	(Gls)
	Eastern Suburbs	360	

International career
	Australia	23	(0)
	Australia B	16	(0)
- * Club domestic league appearances and goals

Joanne Millman (born 18 August 1961) is an Australian former soccer player who played as a sweeper or midfielder for the Australia women's national soccer team between 1983 and 1989.
