= Frank Arok =

Yugoslavian footballer and coach (1932–2021)

Personal information
- Full name: Ferenc Arok
- Date of birth: 20 January 1932
- Place of birth: Kanjiža, Kingdom of Yugoslavia
- Date of death: 12 January 2021 (aged 88)
- Place of death: Subotica, Serbia
- Position: Defender

Senior career*
Years	Team	Apps	(Gls)
- Jedinstvo Stara Pazova

Managerial career
- 1961–1962: Novi Sad
- 1966–1967: Vojvodina (assistant)
- 1969–1972: St George Saints
- 1981–1983: St George Saints
- 1983–1989: Australia
- 1989–1991: St George Saints
- 1991–1994: Marconi Fairfield
- 1994–1996: South Melbourne
- 1996: Port Melbourne
- 1996–1998: Gippsland Falcons
- 1998–1999: Sydney Olympic (coaching director)
- 2000: Port Melbourne
- 2001–2003: Perth Glory (youth)
- * Club domestic league appearances and goals

Ferenc "Frank" Arok AM (Serbian Cyrillic: Ференц Арок, Hungarian: Árok Ferenc; 20 January 1932 – 12 January 2021) was a Yugoslavian footballer and coach.

== Career ==
Arok played for Jedinstvo in Yugoslavia during the 1950s before coaching. In the early 1960s Arok coached FK Novi Sad and FK Vojvodina before moving to Australia. In Australia Arok coached St George Saints, South Melbourne FC, Port Melbourne, Gippsland Falcons, and Sydney Olympic, and the Australian national team. Arok coached Australia in 48 A internationals between 1983 and 1989. In the 1990 Australia Day honours, Arok was made a Member of the Order of Australia (AM) for "service to soccer, particularly as the Australian national coach".

He died on 12 January 2021 in Serbia, aged 88.
