= Australia men's national soccer team records and statistics =

This article lists various soccer records in relation to the Australia men's national soccer team. The page is updated where necessary after each Australia match, and is correct as of 3 July 2026.

== Individual appearances ==
=== Appearances ===
Players in bold are still active internationally.

| Rank | Player | Caps | Goals | Period |
|---|---|---|---|---|
| 1 | Mark Schwarzer | 109 | 0 | 1993–2013 |
| 2 | Tim Cahill | 108 | 50 | 2004–2018 |
| 3 | **Mathew Ryan** | 105 | 0 | 2012–present |
| 4 | Lucas Neill | 96 | 1 | 1996–2013 |
| 5 | Brett Emerton | 95 | 20 | 1998–2012 |
| 6 | Alex Tobin | 87 | 2 | 1988–1998 |
| 6 | **Aziz Behich** | 87 | 3 | 2012–present |
| 8 | **Jackson Irvine** | 86 | 14 | 2013–present |
| 9 | Mark Bresciano | 84 | 13 | 2001–2015 |
| 9 | Paul Wade | 84 | 10 | 1986–1996 |

First player to reach 100 appearances
Mark Schwarzer, 6 September 2012, 3–0 vs. Lebanon

Fastest player to reach 100 appearances
Tim Cahill, 30 March 2004 – 25 June 2017

Most consecutive appearances
Alex Tobin, 63, 4 November 1970 – 30 October 1977

Most appearances as a substitute
Archie Thompson, 34, 28 February 2001 – 7 September 2013

Most consecutive appearances as a substitute
Mark Jankovics, 6, 15 June 1980 – 2 December 1980

Most appearances as a substitute without ever starting a game
Jim Campbell, 4, 27 January 1983 – 18 December 1983

Most appearances in competitive matches (World Cup, Confederations Cup, Asian Cup, Nations Cup and qualifier)
Mathew Ryan, 75, 13 June 2014 – 3 July 2026

Longest Australia career
Mark Schwarzer, 20 years, 38 days, 31 July 1993 – 7 September 2013

Shortest Australia career
Raphael Bove, 1 minute, 6 November 1998, 0–0 vs. United States

Most consecutive appearances comprising entire Australia career
Alan Westwater, 14, 28 May 1967 – 4 April 1968

Youngest player
Duncan Cummings, 17 years, 139 days, 6 August 1975, vs. China

Oldest player
Mark Schwarzer, 40 years, 336 days, 7 September 2013, vs. Brazil

Most appearances at the World Cup finals
Mathew Leckie, 11, 13 June 2014 – 19 June 2026
Mathew Ryan, 11, 13 June 2014 – 3 July 2026
Jackson Irvine, 11, 16 June 2018 – 3 July 2026

Most appearances without ever playing at the World Cup finals
Alex Tobin, 87, 9 March 1988 – 6 November 1999

Most appearances at the Asian Cup finals
Tim Cahill, 16, 8 July 2007 – 27 January 2015
Mathew Ryan, 16, 9 January 2015 – 2 February 2024

Most consecutive years of appearances
Tim Cahill, 14, 2004 to 2018 inclusive

Longest gap between appearances
Ted Drain, 8 years, 74 days, 10 May 1947, 1–2 vs. South Africa – 24 September 1955, 0–6 vs. South Africa

Most appearances by a set of brothers
Aurelio and Tony Vidmar, 120, 1991 – 2006 (Note: Aurelio Vidmar made 44 and Tony Vidmar 76 of their collective 120 appearances.)

Capped by another country
Ken Hough (New Zealand)
Apostolos Giannou (Greece)
Jason Cummings (Scotland)

=== Goals ===
Most goals

Players in bold are still active internationally.

| Rank | Player | Goals | Caps | Average | Period |
|---|---|---|---|---|---|
| 1 | Tim Cahill | 50 | 108 | 0.46 | 2004–2018 |
| 2 | Damian Mori | 29 | 45 | 0.64 | 1992–2002 |
| 3 | Archie Thompson | 28 | 54 | 0.52 | 2001–2013 |
| 4 | John Aloisi | 27 | 55 | 0.49 | 1993–2008 |
| 5 | John Kosmina | 25 | 60 | 0.42 | 1977–1988 |
| 5 | Attila Abonyi | 25 | 61 | 0.41 | 1967–1977 |
| 7 | David Zdrilić | 20 | 31 | 0.65 | 1997–2010 |
| 7 | Mile Jedinak | 20 | 79 | 0.25 | 2008–2018 |
| 7 | Brett Emerton | 20 | 95 | 0.21 | 1998–2012 |
| 10 | Graham Arnold | 19 | 56 | 0.34 | 1985–1997 |

Most goals in competitive matches (World Cup, Nations Cup, Asian Cup and qualifiers)
Tim Cahill, 39, 2 June 2004 – 10 October 2017

Most goals in a match
Archie Thompson, 13, 11 April 2001, vs. American Samoa, World Record

Four goals or more in a match on the greatest number of occasions
George Smith, Damian Mori, twice

Three goals or more in a match on the greatest number of occasions
Damian Mori, four times

Scoring in most consecutive appearances
George Smith, 5, 5 June 1933 – 11 July 1936
Jack Hughes, 5, 3 September 1938 – 1 October 1938
Jim Cunningham, 5, 31 May 1947 – 28 August 1948

Most goals on debut
Frank Parsons, 3, 14 August 1948, 6–0 vs. New Zealand
Ian Hunter, 3, 26 February 1980, 11–2 vs. Papua New Guinea

Most appearances, scoring in every match
Jack Hughes, 6, 17 June 1933 – 1 October 1938

Most goals in a World Cup tournament
Tim Cahill, 2, 2006 World Cup
Brett Holman, 2, 2010 World Cup
Tim Cahill 2, 2014 World Cup
Mile Jedinak, 2, 2018 World Cup

Most goals in total at World Cup tournaments
Tim Cahill, 5, 12 June 2006 – 18 June 2014

First goal
William Maunder, 17 June 1922, vs. New Zealand

First goal in a World Cup finals match
Tim Cahill, 12 June 2006, 3–1 vs. Japan

First goal in a World Cup qualifying campaign
Les Scheinflug, 21 November 1965, 1–6 vs. North Korea
Youngest goalscorer
Duncan Cummings, 17 years, 139 days, 6 August 1975, vs. China

Oldest goalscorer
Tim Cahill, 37 years, 308 days, 10 June 2017, vs. Syria

First goal by a substitute
Ian Johnston, 8 December 1965, vs. Malaysia

First player to score a hat-trick
George Smith, 17 June 1933, 6–4 vs. New Zealand

Most appearances for an outfield player without ever scoring
Stan Lazaridis, 60, 15 April 1993 – 7 October 2006

Most different goalscorers in a match
9, 9 April 2001, 22–0 vs. Tonga (Note: The goalscorers were John Aloisi (6), Damian Mori (4), Kevin Muscat (4), Scott Chipperfield (3), David Zdrilic, Tony Popovic, Tony Vidmar, Archie Thompson and Con Boutsianis)

Most goals against the same opponent
George Smith, 16 vs. New Zealand, 5 June 1933 – 18 July 1936

Highest goals to games average
George Smith, 16 goals in 6 games, average 2.66 goals per game.

=== Captains ===
First captain
Alex Gibb, 17 June 1922, vs. New Zealand

Most appearances as captain
Peter Wilson and Lucas Neill, both 61

=== Discipline ===
Most red cards
Ray Richards and Brett Emerton, 2 each

List of all Australia players sent off

| Player | Date | Against | Location | Result | Competition |
|---|---|---|---|---|---|
| Gilbert Storey | 23 June 1924 | Canada | Royal Agricultural Showground, Sydney | 4–1 | Friendly |
| Ray Richards | 2 December 1970 | Mexico | Estadio Azteca, Mexico City | 0–3 | Friendly |
| Ray Richards | 22 June 1974 | Chile | Olympiastadion, Berlin | 0–2 | 1974 World Cup |
| John Kosmina | 19 November 1977 | Hong Kong | Kuwait City, Kuwait | 0–1 | 1978 World Cup Qualifiers |
| Ken Boden | 5 December 1980 | Hong Kong | Hong Kong | 0–1 | Friendly |
| Ken Murphy | 8 October 1985 | Israel | National Stadium, Ramat Gan | 2–1 | 1986 World Cup Qualifiers |
| Garry McDowall | 20 March 1988 | Israel | Queen Elizabeth II Park, Christchurch | 0–0 | 1988 Olympic Qualifiers |
| Dave Mitchell | 25 September 1988 | Soviet Union | Busan Gudeok Stadium, Pusan | 0–3 | 1988 Olympic Games |
| Wally Savor | 19 March 1989 | Israel | National Stadium, Ramat Gan | 1–1 | 1990 World Cup Qualifier |
| Mike Petersen | 20 September 1992 | Tahiti | Perry Park, Brisbane | 2–0 | 1994 World Cup Qualifier |
| Robert Zabica | 31 July 1993 | Canada | Commonwealth Stadium, Edmonton | 1–2 | 1994 World Cup Qualifier |
| Milan Blagojevic | 10 February 1996 | Japan | Brandon Park, Wollongong | 1–4 | Friendly |
| Joe Spiteri | 24 April 1996 | Chile | Estadio Regional, Antofagasta | 0–3 | Friendly |
| Tony Popovic | 18 September 1996 | South Africa | Johannesburg Athletics Stadium, Doornfontein | 0–2 | Friendly |
| Mark Viduka | 21 December 1997 | Brazil | King Fahd Stadium, Riyadh | 0–6 | 1997 Confederations Cup |
| Goran Lozanovski | 7 February 1998 | Chile | Olympic Park, Melbourne | 0–1 | Friendly |
| Fausto De Amicis | 15 February 1998 | Japan | Hindmarsh Stadium, Adelaide | 0–3 | Friendly |
| Jason van Blerk | 9 February 2000 | China | Estadio Playa Ancha, Valparaíso | 1–2 | Friendly |
| Craig Moore | 9 June 2001 | Japan | Nissan Stadium, Yokohama | 0–1 | 2001 Confederations Cup |
| Danny Tiatto | 20 June 2001 | New Zealand | Westpac Trust Stadium, Wellington | 2–0 | 2002 World Cup Qualifier |
| Patrick Kisnorbo | 6 June 2004 | Solomon Islands | Hindmarsh Stadium | 2–2 | 2006 World Cup Qualifier |
| Luke Wilkshire | 4 June 2006 | Netherlands | De Kuip Stadium, Rotterdam | 1–1 | Friendly |
| Brett Emerton | 22 June 2006 | Croatia | Gottlieb-Daimler-Stadion, Stuttgart | 2–2 | World Cup |
| Lucas Neill | 13 July 2007 | Iraq | Rajamangala National Stadium, Bangkok | 1–3 | 2007 Asian Cup |
| Vince Grella | 21 July 2007 | Japan | Mỹ Đình National Stadium, Hanoi | 1–1 (3–4 pen.) | 2007 Asian Cup |
| Mile Sterjovski | 23 May 2008 | Ghana | Sydney Football Stadium, Sydney | 1–0 | Friendly |
| Rhys Williams | 18 November 2009 | Oman | Sultan Qaboos Sports Complex, Muscat | 2–1 | 2011 Asian Cup Qualifier |
| Tim Cahill | 13 June 2010 | Germany | Moses Mabhida Stadium, Durban | 1–1 | 2010 World Cup |
| Harry Kewell | 19 June 2010 | Ghana | Royal Bafokeng Stadium, Rustenburg | 1–1 | 2010 World Cup |
| Brett Emerton | 7 September 2010 | Poland | Wisla Kraków Stadium, Kraków | 2–1 | Friendly |
| Mark Milligan | 12 June 2012 | Japan | Lang Park, Brisbane | 1–1 | 2012 World Cup Qualifier |
| Mitchell Langerak | 5 March 2014 | Ecuador | The Den, London | 3–4 | Friendly |
| Aiden O'Neill | 3 February 2024 | South Korea | Al Janoub Stadium, Doha | 1–2 | 2023 Asian Cup |
| Kusini Yengi | 5 September 2024 | Bahrain | Robina Stadium, Gold Coast | 0–1 | 2026 World Cup Qualifier |

== Team records ==
Biggest victory
31–0 vs. American Samoa, 11 April 2001

Heaviest defeat
0–8 vs. South Africa, 17 September 1955

Biggest away victory
10–0 vs. New Zealand, 11 July 1936

Biggest away defeat
0–7 vs. Croatia, 25 September 1998

Biggest home victory
31–0 vs. American Samoa, 11 April 2001

Biggest home defeat
0–8 vs. South Africa, 17 September 1955

Biggest victory at the World Cup finals
3–1 vs. Japan, 12 June 2006
2–0 vs. Turkey, 14 June 2026

Heaviest defeat at the World Cup finals
0–4 vs. Germany, 13 June 2010

Biggest victory at the OFC Nations Cup finals
17–0 vs. Cook Islands, 19 June 2000

First defeat to a non-Oceania team
0–1 vs. Canada, 14 June 1924

Most consecutive victories
14, 26 October 1996 vs. Tahiti – 1 October 1997 vs. Tunisia

Most consecutive matches without defeat
20, 21 September 1996 vs. Kuwait – 12 December 1997 vs. Mexico

Most consecutive matches without victory
7, 31 May 1980 – 11 November 1980

Most consecutive defeats
5, 3 September 1955 to 1 October 1955

Most consecutive draws
4, Achieved on two occasions, most recently 6 October 2016 – 23 March 2017

Most consecutive matches without scoring
4, Achieved on four occasions, most recently 25 February 1996 – 23 April 1996

Most consecutive matches without conceding a goal
6, Achieved on two occasions, most recently 17 November 2007 – 1 June 2008

== Miscellaneous ==
First substitute
Arthur McCartney (for Cliff Almond), 10 September 1955, 0–2 vs. South Africa

Australia players who later became manager/head coach
Les Scheinflug, 6 appearances as a player, 1965–1968, 19 matches as manager, 1974–1994
Frank Farina, 37 appearances as a player, 1984–1995, 58 matches as manager, 1999–2005
Graham Arnold, 54 appearances as a player, 1985–1997, 23 matches as manager, 2006–2019
Aurelio Vidmar, 44 appearances as a player, 1991–2001, 1 match as manager, 2013
Ange Postecoglou, 4 appearances as a player, 1986, 49 matches as manager, 2013–2017
Graham Arnold, 54 appearances as a player, 1985–1997, 72 matches as manager, 2006–2007, 2018–2024
Tony Popovic, 58 appearances as a player, 1995–2006, ongoing as manager, 2024–present

Father and son both capped
Alex Gibb (6 caps, 1922–1923) and Lex Gibb (8 caps, 1938–1948)
Percy Lennard (3 caps, 1923) and Jack Lennard (6 caps, 1954–1956)
Andy Henderson (2 caps, 1924) and Bill Henderson (6 caps, 1954–1956)
Cliff van Blerk (2 caps, 1967) and Jason van Blerk (27 caps, 1990–2000)
John Coyne (4 caps, 1979–1980) and Chris Coyne (7 caps, 2008–2009)
Vic Bozanic (1 cap, 1980) and Oliver Bozanic (7 caps, 2013–2015)
Alan Davidson (51 caps, 1980–1993) and Jason Davidson (22 caps, 2012–2015)
Mark Robertson (1 cap, 2001) and Alex Robertson (3 caps, 2023–) (Note: Mark's father Alex also represented Australia in B international matches)
Paul Okon (28 caps, 1991–2003) and Paul Okon-Engstler (10 caps, 2025–)

== See also ==
- Australia at the FIFA World Cup
- Australia at the FIFA Confederations Cup
- Australia at the OFC Nations Cup
- Australia at the AFC Asian Cup
