= Progression of Australia association football goalscoring record =

This is a progressive list of association footballers who have held or co-held the record for internationals goals scored for the Australia national soccer team, beginning with William Maunder, who scored in the 3–1 defeat by New Zealand in Australia's first international game.

The record is held by Tim Cahill, with 50 goals, a record he set after scoring twice against Syria in 2017. Cahill moved beyond Damian Mori's 29 international goals when he scored twice against Ecuador in September 2014. Mori had taken the position of Australia's leading goalscorer in April 2001, when his four goals saw him overtakes Attila Abonyi.

== Criteria ==
This list contains records from only "A" internationals, as recognised by Football Federation Australia.

== Australia record ==
Player	Goals	Date	Opponent	Score	Notes
William Maunder	1	17 June 1922	New Zealand	1–3	
Wilfred Bratten	1	24 June 1922	New Zealand	1–1	Jointly with Maunder
George Brown	1	8 July 1922	New Zealand	1–3	Jointly with Maunder and Bratten
William Maunder	2	9 June 1923	New Zealand	2–1	
Percy Lennard	2	16 June 1923	New Zealand	2–3	Jointly with Maunder
William Maunder	3	30 June 1923	New Zealand	1–4	
William Maunder	5	23 June 1924	Canada	4–1	2 goals
William Maunder	6	12 July 1924	Canada	1–4	
George Smith	7	24 June 1933	New Zealand	4–2	2 goals
George Smith	11	4 July 1936	New Zealand	7–1	4 goals
George Smith	16	11 July 1936	New Zealand	10–0	5 goals
Attila Abonyi	16	24 March 1973	Indonesia	6–0	2 goals, to equal Smith
Ray Baartz	16	24 March 1973	Indonesia	6–0	Jointly with Abonyi and Smith
Attila Abonyi	17	18 August 1973	Iran	3–0	
Ray Baartz	17	11 November 1973	South Korea	2–2	Jointly with Abonyi
Ray Baartz	18	27 April 1974	Uruguay	2–0	
Attila Abonyi	18	2 March 1976	New Zealand	3–1	Jointly with Baartz
Attila Abonyi	19	18 August 1976	Hong Kong	2–0	
Attila Abonyi	20	20 October 1976	Indonesia	1–1	
Attila Abonyi	21	24 October 1976	Hong Kong	2–0	
Attila Abonyi	22	13 March 1977	Chinese Taipei	3–0	
Attila Abonyi	23	16 March 1977	Chinese Taipei	2–1	
Attila Abonyi	24	30 October 1977	Hong Kong	5–2	
Attila Abonyi	25	13 November 1977	Singapore	2–0	
Damian Mori	26	9 April 2001	Tonga	22–0	4 goals
Damian Mori	27	6 July 2001	Vanuatu	2–0	
Damian Mori	28	8 July 2001	New Caledonia	11–0	
Damian Mori	29	14 July 2001	Tahiti	2–1	
Tim Cahill	31	5 March 2014	Ecuador	3–4	2 goals
Tim Cahill	32	26 May 2014	South Africa	1–1	
Tim Cahill	33	13 June 2014	Chile	1–3	
Tim Cahill	34	18 June 2014	Netherlands	2–3	
Tim Cahill	35	8 September 2014	Saudi Arabia	3–2	
Tim Cahill	36	18 November 2014	Japan	1–2	
Tim Cahill	37	9 January 2015	Kuwait	4–1	
Tim Cahill	39	22 January 2015	China	2–0	2 goals
Tim Cahill	41	8 September 2015	Tajikistan	3–0	2 goals
Tim Cahill	42	12 November 2015	Kyrgyzstan	3–0	
Tim Cahill	45	17 November 2015	Bangladesh	4–0	3 goals
Tim Cahill	47	29 March 2016	Jordan	5–1	2 goals
Tim Cahill	48	6 September 2016	United Arab Emirates	1–0	
Tim Cahill	50	10 October 2017	Syria	2–1	2 goals

== See also ==
- Australia men's national soccer team records and statistics
- List of international goals scored by Tim Cahill
