= Australia at the OFC Men's Nations Cup =

The Australia national association football team represented Australia at the OFC Nations Cup from 1980 to 2004.

== OFC Men's Nations Cup record ==
Winners Runners-up Third place

OFC Men's Nations Cup record
Year	Host	Round	Pld	W	D	L	GF	GA	Squad
1973	New Zealand	Did not enter							
1980	New Caledonia	Winners	4	4	0	0	24	4	Squad
1996		Winners	4	3	1	0	14	0	Squad
1998	Australia	Runners-up	4	3	0	1	23	3	Squad
2000	Tahiti	Winners	4	4	0	0	26	0	Squad
2002	New Zealand	Runners-up	5	4	0	1	23	2	Squad
2004	Australia	Winners	7	6	1	0	32	4	Squad
Total		Winners	28	24	2	2	142	13	—

== 1980 OFC Nations Cup ==
=== Group B ===
	Team	P	W	D	L	GF	GA	Pts
1	Australia	3	3	0	0	20	2	6
2	New Caledonia	3	2	0	1	12	11	4
3	Papua New Guinea	3	1	0	2	6	22	2
4	New Hebrides	3	0	0	3	6	9	0

February 24, 1980

Australia	8–0	New Caledonia
Danny Moulis; Ian Hunter 2 Paul Kay 2 Eddie Krncevic 3	(Report)

Noumea, New Caledonia

February 26, 1980

Australia	11–2	Papua New Guinea
Danny Moulis; Arno Bertogna; Vic Bozanic; Ian Hunter 3 Eddie Krncevic; Peter Sharne 4	(Report)	Mouagi; Torea

Noumea, New Caledonia

February 28, 1980

Australia	1–0	New Hebrides
Eddie Krncevic	(Report)

Noumea, New Caledonia

=== Final ===
March 3, 1980

Australia	4–2	Tahiti
Paul Kay 4' 29'; Danny Moulis; Vic Bozanic	(Report)	Andre Wabealo; Erroll Bennett

Noumea, New Caledonia

== 1996 OFC Nations Cup ==
=== Semi-final ===
1995-11-10

New Zealand	0 – 0	Australia
	(Report)

Queen Elizabeth II Park, Christchurch
Attendance: 8,000
Referee: Barry Tasker (NZL)

1995-11-15

Australia	3 – 0	New Zealand
Damian Mori 33'; Paul Wade 45' pen Joe Spiteri 51'	(Report)

Breakers Stadium, Newcastle
Attendance: 8,858
Referee: Simon Micallef (AUS)

=== Final ===
1996-10-27

Tahiti	0 – 6	Australia
	(Report)	Ernie Tapai 5'; Paul Trimboli 20'; Kris Trajanovski 25', 28', 44', 89'

Olympic Stadium, Papeete
Attendance: 5,000
Referee: Barry Tasker (NZL)

1996-11-01

Australia	5 – 0	Tahiti
Robbie Hooker 11'; Kris Trajanovski 21', 36', 54'; Rupena Raumati 31' (og)	(Report)

Bruce Stadium, Canberra
Attendance: 9,421
Referee: Intaz Shah (Fiji)

== 1998 OFC Nations Cup ==
=== Group B ===
Team	Pts	Pld	W	D	L	GF	GA	GD
Australia	6	2	2	0	0	19	1	+18
Fiji	3	2	1	0	1	4	3	+1
Cook Islands	0	2	0	0	2	0	19	-19

25 September 1998

Australia	3–1	Fiji
Mori 2', 25', 44'	(Report)	Masinisau 62'

Suncorp Stadium, Brisbane
Attendance: 900
Referee: Bruce Grimshaw (New Zealand)

28 September 1998

Australia	16–0	Cook Islands
Trimboli 1', 12', 63'; Mori 8', 15', 30', 34'; Maloney 17', 89'; Ceccoli 42'; Trajanovski 48', 68', 76' (pen), 88'; Chipperfield 66'; Halpin 80'	(Report)

Suncorp Stadium, Brisbane
Attendance: 600
Referee: Massimo Raveino (Tahiti)

=== Semi-final ===
2 October 1998

Australia	4-1	Tahiti
Mori 1', 32', 81'; Veart 86'	(Report)	Labaste 55'

Suncorp Stadium, Brisbane
Attendance: 1,200
Referee: Intaz Shah (Fiji)

=== Final ===
4 October 1998

New Zealand	1-0	Australia
Burton 24'	(Report)

Suncorp Stadium, Brisbane
Attendance: 12,000
Referee: Massimo Raveino (Tahiti)

== 2000 OFC Nations Cup ==
=== Group A ===
Team	Pts	Pld	W	D	L	GF	GA	GD
Australia	6	2	2	0	0	23	0	+23
Solomon Islands	3	2	1	0	1	5	7	-2
Cook Islands	0	2	0	0	2	1	22	-21

19 June 2000

Australia	17–0	Cook Islands
Agostino 18', 68'; Muscat 21', 45' (pen); Tiatto 24'; Foster 30', 42', 51', 80'; Zdrilic 35', 65'; Lazaridis 55'; Popovic 60'; Corica 70'; Zane 82', 87', 89'	(Report)

Stade Pater, Papeete, Tahiti
Attendance: 1,000
Referee: Leaustic (Tahiti)

23 June 2000

Australia	6–0	Solomon Islands
Chipperfield 6'; Zane 13', 35'; Omokirio 36' (OG); Muscat 39' (pen); Cardozo 43'	(Report)

Stade Pater, Papeete, Tahiti
Attendance: 300
Referee: Sosongan (Papua New Guinea)

=== Semi-final ===
25 Jun 2000

Australia	1 – 0	Vanuatu
Kevin Muscat 5' pen	(Report)

Stade Pater
Papeete, Tahiti
Attendance: 300

=== Final ===
28 Jun 2000

Australia	2 – 0	New Zealand
Shaun Murphy 40'; Craig Foster 66'	(Report)

Stade Pater
Papeete, Tahiti
Attendance: 300

== 2002 OFC Nations Cup ==
=== Group A ===
Team	Pts	Pld	W	D	L	GF	GA	GD
Australia	9	3	3	0	0	21	0	+21
Vanuatu	6	3	2	0	1	2	2	0
Fiji	3	3	1	0	2	2	10	-8
New Caledonia	0	3	0	0	3	1	14	-13

6 July 2002

Australia	2–0	Vanuatu
Mori 69'; Despotovski 85'	(Report)

Ericsson Stadium, Auckland
Attendance: 1,000
Referee: Ariiotima (Tahiti)

8 July 2002

Australia	11–0	New Caledonia
Despotovski 2', 56' (pen), 76', 77'; Horvat 15'; Chipperfield 22', 35'; Mori 34'; Costanzo 83'; Porter 86'; Trimboli 90+'	(Report)

Ericsson Stadium, Auckland
Attendance: 200
Referee: Rugg (New Zealand)

10 July 2002

Australia	8–0	Fiji
Milicic 4'; Porter 7', 12', 45', 52'; Juric 36'; Trimboli 46'; De Amicis 89'	(Report)

Ericsson Stadium, Auckland
Attendance: 1,000
Referee: Rugg (New Zealand)

=== Semi-final ===
12 July 2002

Australia	2–1 (AET)	Tahiti
Porter 88'; Mori 96'	(Report)	Zaveroni 38'

Ericsson Stadium, Auckland
Attendance: 400
Referee: Rugg (New Zealand)

=== Final ===
14 July 2002

New Zealand	1–0	Australia
Nelsen 78'	(Report)

Ericsson Stadium, Auckland
Attendance: 4,000
Referee: Ariiotima (Tahiti)

== 2004 OFC Nations Cup ==
=== Group stage ===
Pos	Team	Pld	W	D	L	GF	GA	GD	Pts	Qualification
1	Australia	5	4	1	0	21	3	+18	13	Advance to final
2	Solomon Islands	5	3	1	1	9	6	+3	10	Advance to final
3	New Zealand	5	3	0	2	17	5	+12	9	
4	Fiji	5	1	1	3	3	10	−7	4	
5	Tahiti	5	1	1	3	2	24	−22	4	
6	Vanuatu	5	1	0	4	5	9	−4	3	

Rules for classification: Tiebreakers
29 May 2004

Australia	1 – 0	New Zealand
Bresciano 40'	(Report)

Hindmarsh Stadium, Adelaide
Attendance: 12,130
Referee: Claus Bo Larsen (Denmark)

31 May 2004

Australia	9 – 0	Tahiti
Cahill 14', 47'; Skoko 43'; Simon 44' (o.g.); Sterjovski 51', 61', 74'; Zdrilic 85'; Chipperfield 89'	(Report)

Hindmarsh Stadium, Adelaide
Attendance: 1,200
Referee: Harry Attison (Vanuatu)

2 June 2004

Australia	6 – 1	Fiji
Madaschi 6', 50'; Cahill 39', 66', 75'; Elrich 89'	(Report)	Gataurua 19'

Marden Sports Complex, Adelaide
Attendance: 2,200
Referee: Eduardo Iturralde González (Spain)

4 June 2004

Vanuatu	0 – 3	Australia
	(Report)	Aloisi 25', 85'; Emerton 81'

Hindmarsh Stadium, Adelaide
Attendance: 4,000
Referee: Charles Ariiotima (Tahiti)

6 June 2004

Solomon Islands	2 – 2	Australia
Menapi 43', 75'	(Report)	Cahill 50'; Emerton 52'

Hindmarsh Stadium, Adelaide
Attendance: 3,500
Referee: Eduardo Iturralde González (Spain)

=== Final ===
9 October 2004

Solomon Islands	1 – 5	Australia
Batram Suri 60'	(Report)	Skoko 5', 28'; Milicic 19'; Emerton 43'; Elrich 79'

Lawson Tama Stadium, Honiara
Attendance: 21,000
Referee: Peter O'Leary (New Zealand)

12 October 2004

Australia	6 – 0	Solomon Islands
Milicic 5'; Kewell 8'; Vidmar 60'; Thompson 79'; Elrich 82'; Emerton 89'	(Report)

Sydney Football Stadium, Sydney
Attendance: 19,208
Referee: Leone Rakaroi (Fiji)

== Goalscorers ==
Player	Goals	1980	1996	1998	2000	2002	2004
Damian Mori	14			10	1	3	
Kris Trajanovski	11		7	4			
Paul Trimboli	6		1	3		2	
Joel Porter	6					6	
Tim Cahill	6						6
Vaughan Coveny	6						6
Ian Hunter	5	5					
Eddie Krnčević	5	5					
Craig Foster	5				5		
Clayton Zane	5				5		
Bobby Despotovski	5					5	
Paul Kay	4	4					
Scott Chipperfield	4			1		2	1
Kevin Muscat	4				4		
Danny Moulis	3	3					
Ante Milicic	3					1	2
Josip Skoko	3						3
Mile Sterjovski	3						3
Ahmad Elrich	3						3
Brett Emerton	3						3
Vic Bozanic	2	2					
Peter Sharne	2	2					
Brad Maloney	2			2			
Paul Agostino	2				2		
Adrian Madaschi	2						2
John Aloisi	2						2
Arno Bertogna	1	1					
Paul Wade	1		1				
Joe Spiteri	1		1				
Ernie Tapai	1		1				
Robbie Hooker	1		1				
Alvin Ceccoli	1			1			
Troy Halpin	1			1			
Carl Veart	1			1			
Mark Burton	1			1			
Danny Tiatto	1				1		
Stan Lazaridis	1				1		
Tony Popovic	1				1		
Steve Corica	1				1		
Pablo Cardozo	1				1		
Shaun Murphy	1				1		
Steve Horvat	1					1	
Angelo Costanzo	1					1	
Ante Juric	1					1	
Fausto De Amicis	1					1	
Mark Bresciano	1						1
David Zdrilic	1						1
Harry Kewell	1						1
Tony Vidmar	1						1
Archie Thompson	1						1
Total	139	22	12	24	23	22	36

== See also ==
- Australia at the AFC Asian Cup
- Australia at the FIFA World Cup
- Australia at the FIFA Confederations Cup
