= Australia at the FIFA Confederations Cup =

International football tournament

The Australia national association football team represented Australia at the FIFA Confederations Cup on four occasions, in 1997, 2001, 2005 and 2017.

== Record at the FIFA Confederations Cup ==
Winners Runners-up Third place

FIFA Confederations Cup record
Year	Host	Round	Pld	W	D	L	GF	GA	Squad
1992 to 1995		No OFC representative invited							
1997	Saudi Arabia	Runners-up	5	2	1	2	4	8	Squad
1999	Mexico	Did not qualify							
2001	Japan; South Korea	Third place	5	3	0	2	4	2	Squad
2003	France	Did not qualify							
2005	Germany	Group stage	3	0	0	3	5	10	Squad
2009	South Africa	Did not qualify							
2013	Brazil	Did not qualify							
2017	Russia	Group stage	3	0	2	1	4	5	Squad
Total		Runners-up	16	5	3	8	17	25	—

=== Record by opponent ===
FIFA Confederations Cup matches (by team)
Opponent	Pld	W	D	L	GF	GA
Argentina	1	0	0	1	2	4
Brazil	3	1	1	1	1	6
Cameroon	1	0	1	0	1	1
Chile	1	0	1	0	1	1
France	1	1	0	0	1	0
Germany	2	0	0	2	5	7
Japan	1	0	0	1	0	1
Mexico	2	2	0	0	5	1
Saudi Arabia	1	0	0	1	0	1
South Korea	1	0	0	1	0	1
Tunisia	1	0	0	1	0	2
Uruguay	1	1	0	0	1	0

== 1997 FIFA Confederations Cup ==
=== Group A ===
Team	Pld	W	D	L	GF	GA	GD	Pts
Brazil	3	2	1	0	6	2	+4	7
Australia	3	1	1	1	3	2	+1	4
Mexico	3	1	0	2	8	6	+2	3
Saudi Arabia	3	1	0	2	1	8	−7	3

12 December 1997
19:00 AST

Mexico	1–3	Australia
Hernández 80' (pen.)	(Report)	Viduka 45'; Aloisi 59'; Mori 90'

King Fahd II Stadium, Riyadh
Attendance: 15,000
Referee: Pirom Un-Prasert (Thailand)

14 December 1997
20:00 AST

Australia	0–0	Brazil
	(Report)

King Fahd II Stadium, Riyadh
Attendance: 15,000
Referee: Lucien Bouchardeau (Niger)

16 December 1997
17:50 AST

Saudi Arabia	1–0	Australia
Al-Khilaiwi 40'	(Report)

King Fahd II Stadium, Riyadh
Attendance: 55,450
Referee: Javier Castrilli (Argentina)

=== Semi-final ===
19 December 1997
19:00 AST

Uruguay	0–1 (a.e.t.)	Australia
	(Report)	Kewell 92'

King Fahd II Stadium, Riyadh
Attendance: 22,000
Referee: Nikolai Levnikov (Russia)

=== Final ===
21 December 1997
21:00 AST

Brazil	6–0	Australia
Ronaldo 15', 27', 59'; Romário 38', 53', 75' (pen.)	(Report)

King Fahd II Stadium, Riyadh
Attendance: 65,000
Referee: Pirom Un-Prasert (Thailand)

== 2001 FIFA Confederations Cup ==
=== Group A ===
Team	Pld	W	D	L	GF	GA	GD	Pts
France	3	2	0	1	9	1	+8	6
Australia	3	2	0	1	3	1	+2	6
South Korea	3	2	0	1	3	6	−3	6
Mexico	3	0	0	3	1	8	−7	0

30 May 2001
19:30 KST

Mexico	0–2	Australia
	(Report)	Murphy 20'; Skoko 54'

Suwon World Cup Stadium, Suwon
Attendance: 6,232
Referee: Felix Tangawarima (Zimbabwe)

1 June 2001
17:00 KST

Australia	1–0	France
Zane 60'	(Report)

Daegu Stadium, Daegu
Attendance: 44,400
Referee: Carlos Batres (Guatemala)

3 June 2001
19:30 KST

South Korea	1–0	Australia
Hwang Sun-Hong 24'	(Report)

Suwon Stadium, Suwon
Attendance: 42,754
Referee: Óscar Ruiz (Colombia)

=== Semi-final ===
7 June 2001
17:00 JST

Japan	1–0	Australia
Nakata 43'	(Report)

International Stadium, Yokohama
Attendance: 48,699
Referee: Benito Archundia (Mexico)

=== Bronze Final ===
9 June 2001
19:00 KST

Australia	1–0	Brazil
Murphy 84'	(Report)

Munsu Cup Stadium, Ulsan
Attendance: 28,520
Referee: Hellmut Krug (Germany)

== 2005 FIFA Confederations Cup ==
=== Group A ===
Team	Pld	W	D	L	GF	GA	GD	Pts
Germany	3	2	1	0	9	5	+4	7
Argentina	3	2	1	0	8	5	+3	7
Tunisia	3	1	0	2	3	5	−2	3
Australia	3	0	0	3	5	10	−5	0

15 June 2005
21:00 CEST

Germany	4–3	Australia
Kurányi 17'; Mertesacker 23'; Ballack 60' (pen.); Podolski 88'	(Report)	21' Skoko; 31', 90+2' Aloisi

Waldstadion, Frankfurt
Attendance: 46,466
Referee: Carlos Amarilla (Paraguay)

18 June 2005
20:45 CEST

Australia	2–4	Argentina
Aloisi 61' (pen.), 70'	(Report)	12', 53', 89' Figueroa; 31' (pen.) Riquelme

Frankenstadion, Nuremberg
Attendance: 25,218
Referee: Shamsul Maidin (Singapore)

21 June 2005
20:45 CEST

Australia	0–2	Tunisia
	(Report)	26', 70' Santos

Zentralstadion, Leipzig
Attendance: 44,337
Referee: Carlos Chandía (Chile)

== 2017 FIFA Confederations Cup ==
=== Group B ===
Pos	Team	Pld	W	D	L	GF	GA	GD	Pts	Qualification
1	Germany	3	2	1	0	7	4	+3	7	Advance to knockout stage
2	Chile	3	1	2	0	4	2	+2	5	Advance to knockout stage
3	Australia	3	0	2	1	4	5	−1	2	
4	Cameroon	3	0	1	2	2	6	−4	1	

Source: FIFA
Rules for classification: Group stage tiebreakers
19 June 2017
18:00

Australia	2–3	Germany
Rogic 41'; Juric 56'	Report	Stindl 5'; Draxler 44' (pen.); Goretzka 48'

Fisht Olympic Stadium, Sochi
Attendance: 28,605
Referee: Mark Geiger (United States)

22 June 2017
18:00

Cameroon	1–1	Australia
Zambo Anguissa 45+1'	Report	Milligan 60' (pen.)

Krestovsky Stadium, Saint Petersburg
Attendance: 35,021
Referee: Milorad Mažić (Serbia)

25 June 2017
18:00

Chile	1–1	Australia
Rodríguez 67'	Report	Troisi 42'

Otkritie Arena, Moscow
Attendance: 33,639
Referee: Gianluca Rocchi (Italy)

== Goalscorers ==
Player	Goals	1997	2001	2005	2017
John Aloisi	5	1		4	
Shaun Murphy	2		2		
Josip Skoko	2		1	1	
Tomi Juric	1				1
Harry Kewell	1	1			
Mark Milligan	1				1
Damian Mori	1	1			
Tomas Rogic	1				1
James Troisi	1				1
Mark Viduka	1	1			
Clayton Zane	1		1		
Total	17	4	4	5	4

== See also ==
- Australia at the AFC Asian Cup
- Australia at the FIFA World Cup
- Australia at the OFC Nations Cup
