= Lex Gibb =

Australian soccer player

Personal information
- Full name: Lex Gibb
- Place of birth: Ipswich, Australia
- Position: Left-half

Youth career
- Alphas

Senior career*
Years	Team	Apps	(Gls)
1937–1939	Bundamba Rangers		
1939–1940	St. Helens		
1940–1941	Latrobe		
1948	Corinthians		

International career
1938–1948	Australia	8	(0)
- * Club domestic league appearances and goals

Lex Gibb was an Australian professional soccer player who played as a half-back for Australian clubs and the Australia national soccer team and was son of Alex Gibb.

== Early life ==
Gibb was born in Ipswich, to Australia's first capped player Alex.

== Club career ==
Gibb played with the Bundamba Rangers and Latrobe. On 12 March 1948, it was rumoured that Lex Gibb would sign for Brisbane club Corinthians. A day later, he officially transferred to Corinthians where he received a £50 payment signing.

== International career ==
Gibb played for the Australia national soccer team, and played 8 times in three match tours against India, South Africa and New Zealand.

== Personal life ==
=== Family and relationships ===
Lex was born to father Alex Mother Margaret (nee Allan). He had brothers Alan and Alfie and sisters Margaret and Mary.

Lex Gibb was married on 9 August 1941 to wife Myrtle Herton in Bundamba.

== Career statistics ==
=== International ===
National team	Year	Competitive		Friendly		Total	
National team	Year	Apps	Goals	Apps	Goals	Apps	Goals
Australia	1938	0	0	2	0	2	0
Australia	1947	0	0	5	0	5	0
Australia	1948	0	0	1	0	1	0
Career total		0	0	8	0	8	0
