= List of international goals scored by Tim Cahill =

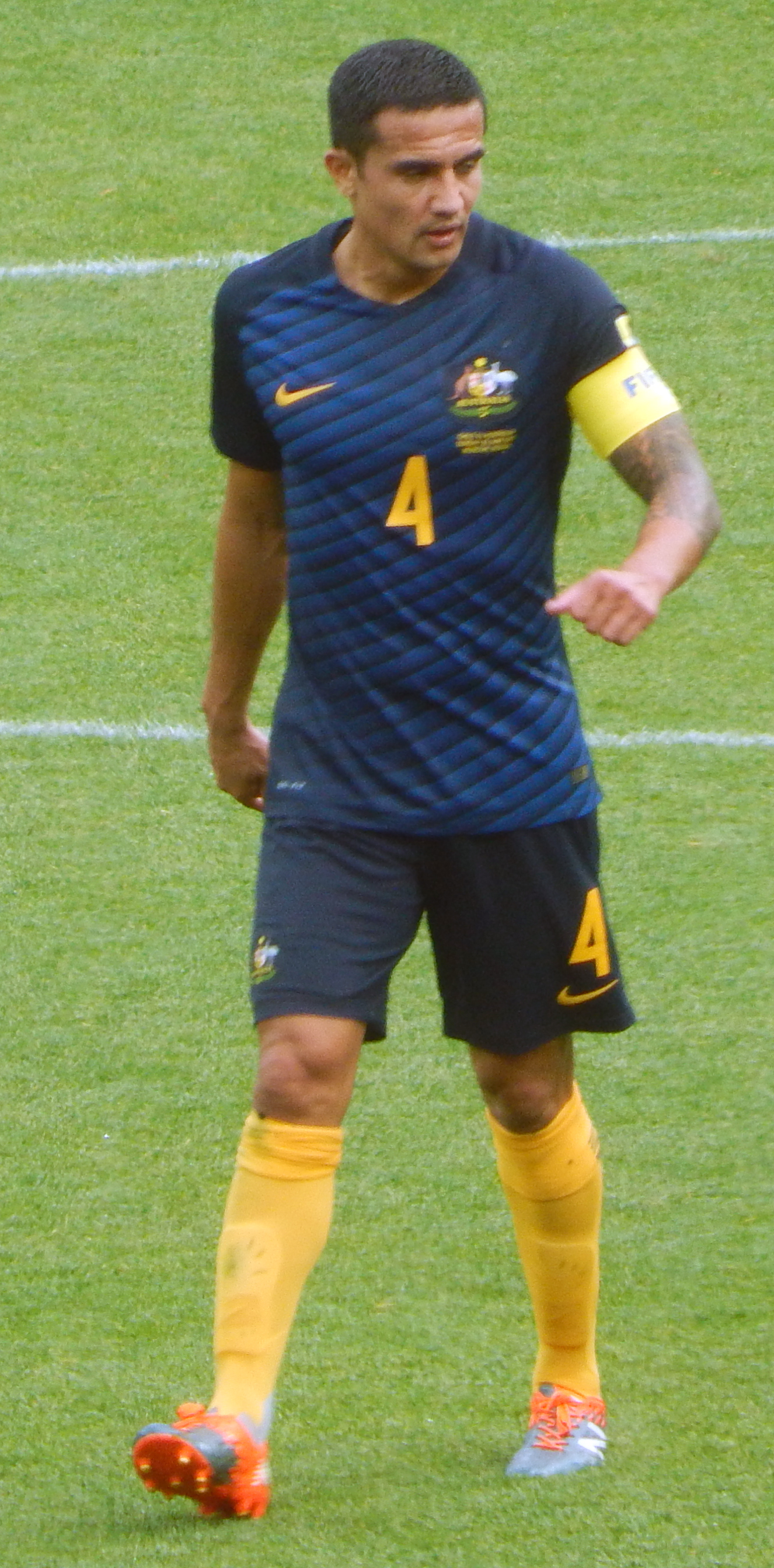
Cahill playing for Australia during the 2017 FIFA Confederations Cup

Tim Cahill is an Australian former professional soccer player who played as a midfielder or forward for the Australia men's national soccer team (nicknamed the "Socceroos") from 2004 to 2018. During his international career, he scored 50 goals in 108 appearances for the side, making him the nation's men's all-time record goalscorer. He played his final game for Australia at the 2018 FIFA World Cup against Peru, and announced his retirement following the end of the tournament. Cahill was well known for his trademark goal celebration, in which he ran to the corner of the pitch and shadowboxed the corner flag.

Cahill made his debut for Australia in a friendly against South Africa in March 2004. He scored his first two goals for the side in a win over Tahiti at the 2004 OFC Nations Cup. In the next game of the tournament, he scored his first international hat-trick against Fiji. His 12th international goal, and Australia's first in an Asian Cup, was against Oman on 8 July at the 2007 AFC Asian Cup. His 29th international goal against Costa Rica on 19 November 2013 equalled fellow Australian Damian Mori's record, which he surpassed on 5 March 2014 with two goals in a friendly against Ecuador. During a 4–0 win over Bangladesh on 17 November 2015 in a 2018 World Cup second round qualifier, he scored the first three goals of the match, marking his second and final international hat-trick. Excluding those two hat-tricks, Cahill scored twice in an international match on ten occasions.

During his international career, Cahill scored five goals against AFC rivals Japan, more than he scored against any other country. Two of these goals were at the 2006 World Cup, which were also the first goals scored by Australia at any World Cup. He also scored against Serbia at the 2010 World Cup and against both Chile and the Netherlands at the 2014 World Cup. His volleyed goal against the Netherlands was subsequently nominated for the 2014 FIFA Puskás Award, an award given to the player who scored the "most beautiful" goal of the calendar year.

On 10 October 2017, Cahill scored both goals in a 2–1 win over Syria during a 2018 World Cup fourth round qualifier. The second of these was Cahill's 50th and final international goal, making him the 59th man to score 50 international goals. During his career, Cahill scored six goals at three Asian Cups (2007, 2011, 2015) and six goals at one OFC Nations Cup (2004). Thirteen of Cahill's 50 international goals were scored in friendlies, all of them against nations from each of the six confederations.

== Goals ==
Scores and results list Australia's goal tally first, score column indicates score after each Cahill goal.

No.	Cap	Date	Venue	Opponent	Score	Result	Competition	Ref.
1	2	31 May 2004	Hindmarsh Stadium, Adelaide, Australia	Tahiti	1–0	9–0	2004 OFC Nations Cup	
2	2	31 May 2004	Hindmarsh Stadium, Adelaide, Australia	Tahiti	4–0	9–0	2004 OFC Nations Cup	
3	3	2 June 2004	Marden Sports Complex, Adelaide, Australia	Fiji	1–1	6–1	2004 OFC Nations Cup	
4	3	2 June 2004	Marden Sports Complex, Adelaide, Australia	Fiji	4–1	6–1	2004 OFC Nations Cup	
5	3	2 June 2004	Marden Sports Complex, Adelaide, Australia	Fiji	5–1	6–1	2004 OFC Nations Cup	
6	4	6 June 2004	Hindmarsh Stadium, Adelaide, Australia	Solomon Islands	1–1	2–2	2004 OFC Nations Cup	
7	5	16 November 2004	Craven Cottage, London, England	Norway	2–1	2–2	Friendly	
8	11	3 September 2005	Sydney Football Stadium, Sydney, Australia	Solomon Islands	4–0	7–0	2006 FIFA World Cup qualification	
9	15	4 June 2006	Feijenoord Stadion, Rotterdam, Netherlands	Netherlands	1–1	1–1	Friendly	
10	17	12 June 2006	Fritz-Walter-Stadion, Kaiserslautern, Germany	Japan	1–1	3–1	2006 FIFA World Cup	
11	17	12 June 2006	Fritz-Walter-Stadion, Kaiserslautern, Germany	Japan	2–1	3–1	2006 FIFA World Cup	
12	24	8 July 2007	Rajamangala National Stadium, Bangkok, Thailand	Oman	1–1	1–1	2007 AFC Asian Cup	
13	28	6 February 2008	Docklands Stadium, Melbourne, Australia	Qatar	2–0	3–0	2010 FIFA World Cup qualification – AFC third round	
14	29	15 October 2008	Suncorp Stadium, Brisbane, Australia	Qatar	1–0	4–0	2010 FIFA World Cup qualification – AFC fourth round	
15	33	17 June 2009	Melbourne Cricket Ground, Melbourne, Australia	Japan	1–1	2–1	2010 FIFA World Cup qualification – AFC fourth round	
16	33	17 June 2009	Melbourne Cricket Ground, Melbourne, Australia	Japan	2–1	2–1	2010 FIFA World Cup qualification – AFC fourth round	
17	34	12 August 2009	Thomond Park, Limerick, Ireland	Republic of Ireland	1–0	3–0	Friendly	
18	34	12 August 2009	Thomond Park, Limerick, Ireland	Republic of Ireland	2–0	3–0	Friendly	
19	36	14 October 2009	Docklands Stadium, Melbourne, Australia	Oman	1–0	1–0	2011 AFC Asian Cup qualification	
20	40	5 June 2010	Ruimsig Stadium, Roodepoort, South Africa	United States	1–1	1–3	Friendly	
21	42	23 June 2010	Mbombela Stadium, Mbombela, South Africa	Serbia	1–0	2–1	2010 FIFA World Cup	
22	47	11 January 2011	Jassim bin Hamad Stadium, Al Rayyan, Qatar	India	1–0	4–0	2011 AFC Asian Cup	
23	47	11 January 2011	Jassim bin Hamad Stadium, Al Rayyan, Qatar	India	4–0	4–0	2011 AFC Asian Cup	
24	53	10 August 2011	Cardiff City Stadium, Cardiff, Wales	Wales	2–1	2–1	Friendly	
25	58	6 September 2012	Saida Municipal Stadium, Sidon, Lebanon	Lebanon	1–0	3–0	Friendly	
26	60	16 October 2012	Grand Hamad Stadium, Doha, Qatar	Iraq	1–1	2–1	2014 FIFA World Cup qualification – AFC fourth round	
27	61	26 March 2013	Stadium Australia, Sydney, Australia	Oman	1–2	2–2	2014 FIFA World Cup qualification – AFC fourth round	
28	63	11 June 2013	Docklands Stadium, Melbourne, Australia	Jordan	2–0	4–0	2014 FIFA World Cup qualification – AFC fourth round	
29	66	19 November 2013	Sydney Football Stadium, Sydney, Australia	Costa Rica	1–0	1–0	Friendly	
30	67	5 March 2014	The Den, London, England	Ecuador	1–0	3–4	Friendly	
31	67	5 March 2014	The Den, London, England	Ecuador	3–0	3–4	Friendly	
32	68	26 May 2014	Stadium Australia, Sydney, Australia	South Africa	1–1	1–1	Friendly	
33	70	13 June 2014	Arena Pantanal, Cuiabá, Brazil	Chile	1–2	1–3	2014 FIFA World Cup	
34	71	18 June 2014	Estádio Beira-Rio, Porto Alegre, Brazil	Netherlands	1–1	2–3	2014 FIFA World Cup	
35	73	8 September 2014	Craven Cottage, London, England	Saudi Arabia	1–0	3–2	Friendly	
36	76	18 November 2014	Nagai Stadium, Osaka, Japan	Japan	1–2	1–2	Friendly	
37	77	9 January 2015	Melbourne Rectangular Stadium, Melbourne, Australia	Kuwait	1–1	4–1	2015 AFC Asian Cup	
38	80	22 January 2015	Suncorp Stadium, Brisbane, Australia	China	1–0	2–0	2015 AFC Asian Cup	
39	80	22 January 2015	Suncorp Stadium, Brisbane, Australia	China	2–0	2–0	2015 AFC Asian Cup	
40	85	8 September 2015	Pamir Stadium, Dushanbe, Tajikistan	Tajikistan	2–0	3–0	2018 FIFA World Cup qualification – AFC second round	
41	85	8 September 2015	Pamir Stadium, Dushanbe, Tajikistan	Tajikistan	3–0	3–0	2018 FIFA World Cup qualification – AFC second round	
42	87	12 November 2015	Canberra Stadium, Canberra, Australia	Kyrgyzstan	2–0	3–0	2018 FIFA World Cup qualification – AFC second round	
43	88	17 November 2015	Bangabandhu National Stadium, Dhaka, Bangladesh	Bangladesh	1–0	4–0	2018 FIFA World Cup qualification – AFC second round	
44	88	17 November 2015	Bangabandhu National Stadium, Dhaka, Bangladesh	Bangladesh	2–0	4–0	2018 FIFA World Cup qualification – AFC second round	
45	88	17 November 2015	Bangabandhu National Stadium, Dhaka, Bangladesh	Bangladesh	3–0	4–0	2018 FIFA World Cup qualification – AFC second round	
46	89	29 March 2016	Sydney Football Stadium, Sydney, Australia	Jordan	1–0	5–1	2018 FIFA World Cup qualification – AFC second round	
47	89	29 March 2016	Sydney Football Stadium, Sydney, Australia	Jordan	3–0	5–1	2018 FIFA World Cup qualification – AFC second round	
48	92	6 September 2016	Mohammed bin Zayed Stadium, Abu Dhabi, United Arab Emirates	United Arab Emirates	1–0	1–0	2018 FIFA World Cup qualification – AFC third round	
49	103	10 October 2017	Stadium Australia, Sydney, Australia	Syria	1–1	2–1	2018 FIFA World Cup qualification – AFC fourth round	
50	103	10 October 2017	Stadium Australia, Sydney, Australia	Syria	2–1	2–1	2018 FIFA World Cup qualification – AFC fourth round	

== Statistics ==
Goals by year
Year	Apps	Goals
2004	5	7
2005	9	1
2006	8	3
2007	5	1
2008	3	2
2009	7	5
2010	9	2
2011	9	3
2012	5	2
2013	2	3
2014	14	7
2015	12	9
2016	6	3
2017	10	2
2018	4	0
Total	108	50

Goals by competition
Competition	Goals
FIFA World Cup tournaments	5
FIFA World Cup qualification	19
AFC Asian Cup tournaments	6
AFC Asian Cup qualification	1
OFC Nations Cup tournaments	6
Friendlies	13
Total	50

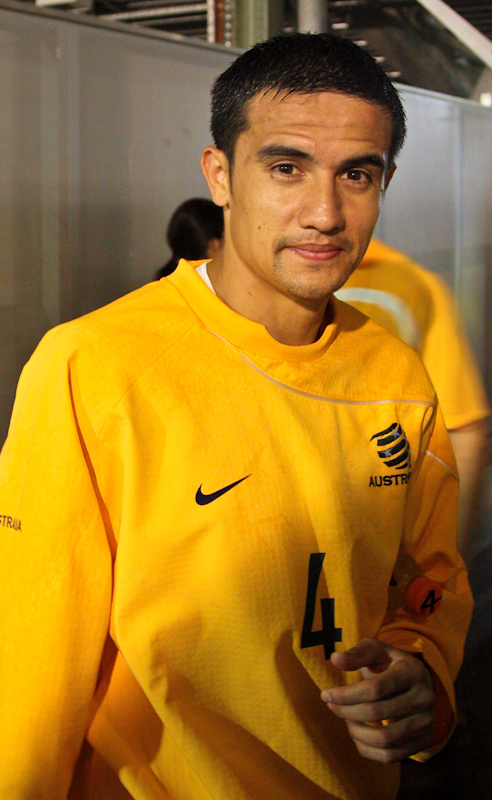
Cahill after a training session at the ANZ Stadium the day before a 2010 World Cup qualifying match against Uzbekistan in 2009

== See also ==
- List of men's footballers with 50 or more international goals
- List of top international men's association football goal scorers by country
- List of Australia men's national soccer team hat-tricks
