= Australia at the AFC Asian Cup =

The Australia men's national soccer team has represented Australia at the AFC Asian Cup on five occasions in 2007, 2011, 2015 (where Australia both hosted the tournament and won the title), 2019 and 2023. Australia has qualified for the 2027 AFC Asian Cup to be held in Saudi Arabia.

== Record at the AFC Asian Cup ==
Winners Runners-up Third place

AFC Asian Cup record										Qualification record						
Year	Host	Round	Pld	W	D	L	GF	GA	Squad	Pos.	Pld	W	D	L	GF	GA
1956 to 2004		Not an AFC member								Not an AFC member						
2007 (Note: Australia played their 2007 matches in Thailand and Vietnam.)	Indonesia; Malaysia; Thailand; Vietnam	Quarter-finals	4	1	2	1	7	5	Squad	1st	4	3	0	1	7	3
2011	Qatar	Runners-up	6	4	1	1	13	2	Squad	1st	6	3	2	1	6	4
2015	Australia	Winners	6	5	0	1	14	3	Squad	Qualified as hosts						
2019	United Arab Emirates	Quarter-finals	5	2	1	2	6	4	Squad	1st	8	7	0	1	29	4
2023	Qatar	Quarter-finals	5	3	1	1	9	3	Squad	1st	8	8	0	0	28	2
2027	Saudi Arabia	Qualified								1st	6	6	0	0	22	0
Total		Winners	26	15	5	6	49	17	—	6/6	32	27	2	3	92	13

== Head-to-head record ==
Opponent	Pld	W	D	L	GF	GA	GD	Win %
Bahrain	1	1	0	0	1	0	+1	100.00
China	1	1	0	0	2	0	+2	100.00
India	2	2	0	0	6	0	+6	100.00
Indonesia	1	1	0	0	4	0	+4	100.00
Iraq	2	1	0	1	2	3	−1	50.00
Japan	2	0	1	1	1	2	−1	0.00
Jordan	1	0	0	1	0	1	−1	0.00
Kuwait	1	1	0	0	4	1	+3	100.00
Oman	2	1	1	0	5	1	+4	50.00
Palestine	1	1	0	0	3	0	+3	100.00
South Korea	4	1	1	2	4	5	−1	25.00
Syria	2	2	0	0	4	2	+2	100.00
Thailand	1	1	0	0	4	0	+4	100.00
United Arab Emirates	2	1	0	1	2	1	+1	50.00
Uzbekistan	3	1	2	0	7	1	+6	33.33
Total	26	15	5	6	49	17	+32	57.69

== 2007 AFC Asian Cup ==
=== Group stage ===
Team	Pld	W	D	L	GF	GA	GD	Pts
Iraq	3	1	2	0	4	2	+2	5
Australia	3	1	1	1	6	4	+2	4
Thailand	3	1	1	1	3	5	−2	4
Oman	3	0	2	1	1	3	−2	2

8 July 2007
17:20 UTC+7

Australia	1–1	Oman
Cahill 90+2'		Al-Maimani 32'

Rajamangala Stadium, Bangkok
Attendance: 5,000
Referee: Eddy Maillet (Seychelles)

13 July 2007
17:20 UTC+7

Iraq	3–1	Australia
Nashat Akram 22'; Hawar Mohammed 60'; Karrar Jassim 86'		Viduka 47'

Rajamangala Stadium, Bangkok
Attendance: 6,000
Referee: Jasim Karim (Bahrain)

16 July 2007
19:35 UTC+7

Thailand	0–4	Australia
		Beauchamp 21'; Viduka 80', 83'; Kewell 90'

Rajamangala Stadium, Bangkok
Attendance: 46,000
Referee: Kwon Jong-Chul (South Korea)

=== Quarter-final ===
21 July 2007
17:20 UTC+7

Japan	1–1 (a.e.t.)	Australia
Takahara 72'		Aloisi 70'
Penalties
Nakamura (penalty scored); Endō (penalty scored); Komano (penalty scored); Takahara (penalty missed); Nakazawa (penalty scored)	4 – 3	(penalty missed) Kewell; (penalty missed) Neill; (penalty scored) Cahill; (penalty scored) Carle; (penalty scored) Carney

Mỹ Đình National Stadium, Hanoi
Attendance: 25,000
Referee: Saad Kamil Al-Fadhli (Kuwait)

== 2011 AFC Asian Cup ==
=== Group stage ===
Team	Pld	W	D	L	GF	GA	GD	Pts
Australia	3	2	1	0	6	1	+5	7
South Korea	3	2	1	0	7	3	+4	7
Bahrain	3	1	0	2	6	5	+1	3
India	3	0	0	3	3	13	−10	0

10 January 2011
16:15

India	0–4	Australia
		Cahill 11', 65'; Kewell 24'; Holman 45+2'

Jassim Bin Hamad Stadium, Doha
Attendance: 9,783
Referee: Ali Al Badwawi (UAE)

14 January 2011
16:15

Australia	1–1	South Korea
Jedinak 62'		Koo Ja-Cheol 24'

Al Gharafa Stadium, Doha
Attendance: 15,526
Referee: Abdulrahman Abdou (Qatar)

18 January 2011
16:15

Australia	1–0	Bahrain
Jedinak 37'

Jassim Bin Hamad Stadium, Doha
Attendance: 3,919
Referee: Yuichi Nishimura (Japan)

=== Quarter-final ===
22 January 2011
16:25

Australia	1–0 (a.e.t.)	Iraq
Kewell 118'

Jassim Bin Hamad Stadium, Doha
Attendance: 7,889
Referee: Abdulrahman Abdou (Qatar)

=== Semi-final ===
25 January 2011
19:25

Uzbekistan	0–6	Australia
		Kewell 5'; Ognenovski 35'; Carney 65'; Emerton 73'; Valeri 82'; Kruse 83'

Khalifa International Stadium, Doha
Attendance: 24,826
Referee: Ali Al Badwawi (UAE)

=== Final ===
29 January 2011
18:00

Australia	0–1 (a.e.t.)	Japan
		Lee 109'

Khalifa International Stadium, Doha
Attendance: 37,174
Referee: Ravshan Irmatov (Uzbekistan)

== 2015 AFC Asian Cup ==
=== Group stage ===
Team	Pld	W	D	L	GF	GA	GD	Pts
South Korea	3	3	0	0	3	0	+3	9
Australia	3	2	0	1	8	2	+6	6
Oman	3	1	0	2	1	5	-4	3
Kuwait	3	0	0	3	1	6	-5	0

9 January 2015
20:00 UTC+11

Australia	4–1	Kuwait
Cahill 32'; Luongo 44'; Jedinak 62' (pen.); Troisi 90+2'	Report	Fadhel 8'

Melbourne Rectangular Stadium, Melbourne
Attendance: 25,231
Referee: Ravshan Irmatov (Uzbekistan)

13 January 2015
20:00 UTC+11

Oman	0–4	Australia
	Report	McKay 27'; Kruse 30'; Milligan 45+3' (pen.); Juric 70'

Stadium Australia, Sydney
Attendance: 50,276
Referee: Ryuji Sato (Japan)

17 January 2015
19:00 UTC+10

Australia	0–1	South Korea
	Report	Lee Jung-hyup 32'

Brisbane Stadium, Brisbane
Attendance: 48,513
Referee: Nawaf Shukralla (Bahrain)

=== Quarter-final ===
22 January 2015
20:30 UTC+10

China	0–2	Australia
	Report	Cahill 49', 65'

Brisbane Stadium, Brisbane
Attendance: 46,067
Referee: Kim Jong-hyeok (South Korea)

=== Semi-final ===
27 January 2015
20:00 UTC+11

Australia	2–0	United Arab Emirates
Sainsbury 3'; Davidson 14'	Report

Newcastle Stadium, Newcastle
Attendance: 21,079
Referee: Ravshan Irmatov (Uzbekistan)

=== Final ===
31 January 2015
20:00 UTC+11

South Korea	1–2 (a.e.t.)	Australia
Son Heung-min 90+1'	Report	Luongo 45'; Troisi 105'

Stadium Australia, Sydney
Attendance: 76,385
Referee: Alireza Faghani (Iran)

== 2019 AFC Asian Cup ==
=== Group stage ===
Pos	Team	Pld	W	D	L	GF	GA	GD	Pts	Qualification
1	Jordan	3	2	1	0	3	0	+3	7	Advance to knockout stage
2	Australia	3	2	0	1	6	3	+3	6	Advance to knockout stage
3	Palestine	3	0	2	1	0	3	−3	2	
4	Syria	3	0	1	2	2	5	−3	1	

Source: AFC
6 January 2019
15:00

Australia	0–1	Jordan
	Report	Bani Yaseen 26'

Hazza bin Zayed Stadium, Al Ain
Attendance: 4,934
Referee: Ahmed Al-Kaf (Oman)

11 January 2019
15:00

Palestine	0–3	Australia
	Report	Maclaren 18'; Mabil 20'; Giannou 90'

Rashid Stadium, Dubai
Attendance: 11,915
Referee: Valentin Kovalenko (Uzbekistan)

15 January 2019
17:30

Australia	3–2	Syria
Mabil 41'; Ikonomidis 54'; Rogic 90+3'	Report	Kharbin 43'; Al Somah 80' (pen.)

Khalifa bin Zayed Stadium, Al Ain
Attendance: 10,492
Referee: César Ramos (Mexico)

=== Round of 16 ===
21 January 2019
18:00

Australia	0–0 (a.e.t.)	Uzbekistan
	Report
Penalties
Milligan (penalty scored); Behich (penalty missed); Kruse (penalty scored); Giannou (penalty scored); Leckie (penalty scored)	4–2	(penalty scored) Shukurov; (penalty missed) Tukhtakhodjaev; (penalty scored) Alibaev; (penalty missed) Bikmaev

Khalifa bin Zayed Stadium, Al Ain
Attendance: 6,809
Referee: Abdulrahman Al-Jassim (Qatar)

=== Quarter-final ===
25 January 2019
20:00

United Arab Emirates	1–0	Australia
Mabkhout 68'	Report

Hazza bin Zayed Stadium, Al Ain
Attendance: 25,053
Referee: Ryuji Sato (Japan)

== 2023 AFC Asian Cup ==
=== Group stage ===
Pos	Team	Pld	W	D	L	GF	GA	GD	Pts	Qualification
1	Australia	3	2	1	0	4	1	+3	7	Advance to knockout stage
2	Uzbekistan	3	1	2	0	4	1	+3	5	Advance to knockout stage
3	Syria	3	1	1	1	1	1	0	4	Advance to knockout stage
4	India	3	0	0	3	0	6	−6	0	

Source: AFC
13 January 2024
14:30

Australia	2–0	India
Irvine 50'; Bos 73'	Report

Ahmad bin Ali Stadium, Al Rayyan
Attendance: 36,253
Referee: Yoshimi Yamashita (Japan)

18 January 2024
14:30

Syria	0–1	Australia
	Report	Irvine 59'

Jassim bin Hamad Stadium, Al Rayyan
Attendance: 10,097
Referee: Adel Al-Naqbi (United Arab Emirates)

23 January 2024
14:30

Australia	1–1	Uzbekistan
Boyle 45+1' (pen.)	Report	Turgunboev 78'

Al Janoub Stadium, Al Wakrah
Attendance: 15,290
Referee: Yusuke Araki (Japan)

=== Knockout stage ===
==== Round of 16 ====
28 January 2024
14:30

Australia	4–0	Indonesia
Baggott 12' (o.g.); Boyle 45'; Goodwin 89'; Souttar 90+1'	Report

Jassim bin Hamad Stadium, Al Rayyan
Attendance: 7,863
Referee: Mohammed Abdulla Hassan Mohamed (United Arab Emirates)

==== Quarter-finals ====
2 February 2024
18:30

Australia	1–2 (a.e.t.)	South Korea
Goodwin 42'	Report	Hwang Hee-chan 90+6' (pen.); Son Heung-min 104'

Al Janoub Stadium, Al Wakrah
Attendance: 39,632
Referee: Ahmed Al-Kaf (Oman)

== 2027 AFC Asian Cup ==
=== Group stage ===
Pos	Team	Pld	W	D	L	GF	GA	GD	Pts	Qualification
1	Australia	0	0	0	0	0	0	0	0	Advance to knockout stage
2	Tajikistan	0	0	0	0	0	0	0	0	Advance to knockout stage
3	Iraq	0	0	0	0	0	0	0	0	Possible knockout stage based on ranking
4	Singapore	0	0	0	0	0	0	0	0	

First match(es) will be played: January 2027. Source: AFC
9 January 2027

Australia	Match 7	Singapore

Aramco Stadium, Al Khobar

14 January 2027

Iraq	Match 18	Australia

King Saud University Stadium, Riyadh

19 January 2027

Australia	Match 31	Tajikistan

Al Shabab Stadium, Riyadh

== Goalscorers ==
Player	Goals	2007	2011	2015	2019	2023
Tim Cahill	6	1	2	3		
Harry Kewell	4	1	3			
Mark Viduka	3	3				
Mile Jedinak	3		2	1		
Robbie Kruse	2		1	1		
Massimo Luongo	2			2		
James Troisi	2			2		
Awer Mabil	2				2	
Martin Boyle	2					2
Jackson Irvine	2					2
Craig Goodwin	2					2
Michael Beauchamp	1	1				
John Aloisi	1	1				
Brett Holman	1		1			
Saša Ognenovski	1		1			
David Carney	1		1			
Brett Emerton	1		1			
Carl Valeri	1		1			
Matt McKay	1			1		
Mark Milligan	1			1		
Tomi Juric	1			1		
Trent Sainsbury	1			1		
Jason Davidson	1			1		
Jamie Maclaren	1				1	
Apostolos Giannou	1				1	
Chris Ikonomidis	1				1	
Tom Rogic	1				1	
Jordan Bos	1					1
Harry Souttar	1					1
Own goals	1					1
Total	48	7	13	14	6	9

== See also ==
- Australia at the FIFA Confederations Cup
- Australia at the FIFA World Cup
- Australia at the OFC Nations Cup
