= Australia at the FIFA World Cup =

International football delegation

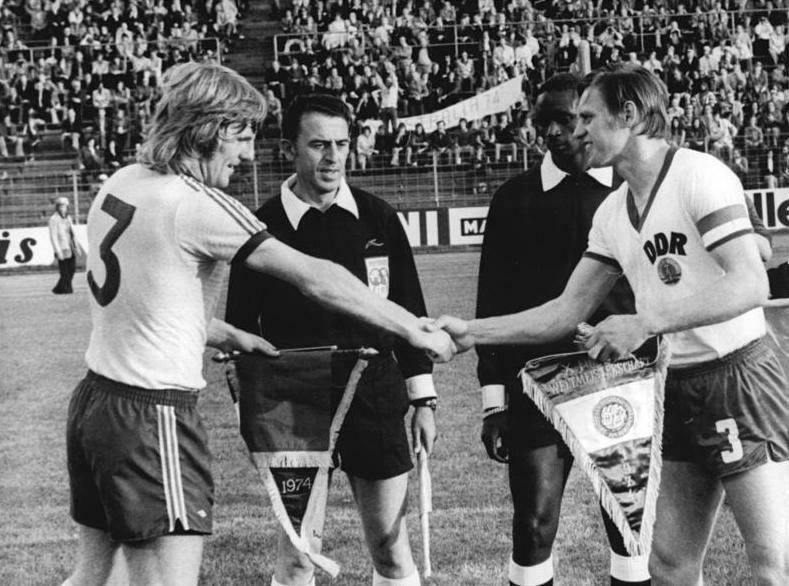
Australian Peter Wilson with East German Bernd Bransch before their match at the 1974 FIFA World Cup

This article summarises the results and overall performances of Australia at the FIFA World Cup.

Australia’s men’s team has qualified for the FIFA World Cup finals on seven occasions: 1974, 2006, 2010, 2014, 2018, 2022 and 2026. They have also attempted to qualify for the FIFA World Cup 15 times, with their first attempt being in 1966 when they lost to North Korea.

In Australia's first appearance in 1974, representing OFC, a team made up entirely of amateurs secured a scoreless draw against Chile, though they eventually departed from the tournament without a goal to show for their inaugural appearance. Australia made up for lost time at Germany 2006 and qualified for the Round of 16 before narrowly falling to eventual champions Italy. The German theme continued at South Africa 2010 although this time Australia, now representing the AFC, suffered a 4–0 loss against the European giants in a scoreline which ultimately scuppered their progress. A ten-man 1–1 draw against Ghana and a 2–1 win against Serbia saw Australia eliminated on goal difference, three goals off the Africans. Australia were to lose all three games in a tough group at Brazil 2014. In Russia 2018, it took a late own-goal for the eventual champions France to beat them, and a draw with Denmark gave them a chance depending on other results: but a loss to Peru in the final game, and Denmark's draw with France (which would have ended their chances even with a victory) put them out in the group stages. In the Qatar 2022 edition, Australia made it to the last 16 for only the second time - once again losing to France, but scoring victories over Denmark and Tunisia, before falling 2–1 to Argentina, which, like what happened to 2006 Italy, Argentina would eventually claim the World Cup title in 2022. In the jointly hosted 2026 World Cup in North America, Australia made it to the newly introduced round of 32 where they were knocked out by Egypt 4–2 on penalties after drawing 1–1 through extra time. Both Australia's goals in the knockout stages, in 2022 and 2026 have been own goals.

== FIFA World Cup record ==
Winners Runners-up Third place

FIFA World Cup record										Qualification record						
Year	Host	Round	Pld	W	D	L	GF	GA	Squad	Pos.	Pld	W	D	L	GF	GA
1930 to 1962		Not a FIFA member								Not a FIFA member						
1966	England	Did not qualify								2nd	2	0	0	2	2	9
1970	Mexico	Did not qualify								1st	9	3	5	1	12	8
1974	West Germany	Group stage	3	0	1	2	0	5	Squad	1st	11	5	5	1	21	10
1978	Argentina	Did not qualify								4th	12	6	2	4	20	11
1982	Spain	Did not qualify								2nd	8	4	2	2	22	9
1986	Mexico	Did not qualify								1st	8	4	3	1	20	4
1990	Italy	Did not qualify								2nd	6	2	2	2	11	7
1994	United States	Did not qualify								1st	10	7	1	2	21	7
1998	France	Did not qualify								1st	8	6	2	0	34	5
2002	Japan; South Korea	Did not qualify								1st	8	7	0	1	73	4
2006	Germany	Round of 16	4	1	1	2	5	6	Squad	1st	9	7	1	1	31	5
2010	South Africa	Group stage	3	1	1	1	3	6	Squad	1st	14	9	3	2	19	4
2014	Brazil	Group stage	3	0	0	3	3	9	Squad	2nd	14	8	4	2	25	12
2018	Russia	Group stage	3	0	1	2	2	5	Squad	3rd	22	14	6	2	51	18
2022	Qatar	Round of 16	4	2	0	2	4	6	Squad	3rd	20	13	4	3	45	12
2026	Canada; Mexico; United States	Round of 32	4	1	2	1	3	3	Squad	2nd	16	11	4	1	38	7
2030	Morocco; Portugal; Spain	To be determined								To be determined						
2034	Saudi Arabia	To be determined								To be determined						
Total		Round of 16	24	5	6	13	20	40	—	7/16	177	106	44	27	445	132

== By match ==
Year	Round	Opponent	Score	Australia scorers
(Germany) 1974	Group 1	East Germany	0–2	—
(Germany) 1974	Group 1	West Germany	0–3	—
(Germany) 1974	Group 1	Chile	0–0	—
(Germany) 2006	Group F	Japan	3–1	Tim Cahill (2), John Aloisi
(Germany) 2006	Group F	Brazil	0–2	—
(Germany) 2006	Group F	Croatia	2–2	Craig Moore, Harry Kewell
(Germany) 2006	Round of 16	Italy	0–1	—
(South Africa) 2010	Group D	Germany	0–4	—
(South Africa) 2010	Group D	Ghana	1–1	Brett Holman
(South Africa) 2010	Group D	Serbia	2–1	Tim Cahill, Brett Holman
(Brazil) 2014	Group B	Chile	1–3	Tim Cahill
(Brazil) 2014	Group B	Netherlands	2–3	Tim Cahill, Mile Jedinak
(Brazil) 2014	Group B	Spain	0–3	—
(Russia) 2018	Group C	France	1–2	Mile Jedinak
(Russia) 2018	Group C	Denmark	1–1	Mile Jedinak
(Russia) 2018	Group C	Peru	0–2	—
(Qatar) 2022	Group D	France	1–4	Craig Goodwin
(Qatar) 2022	Group D	Tunisia	1–0	Mitch Duke
(Qatar) 2022	Group D	Denmark	1–0	Matthew Leckie
(Qatar) 2022	Round of 16	Argentina	1–2	Enzo Fernández (o.g.)
(Canada) (Mexico) (United States) 2026	Group D	Turkey	2–0	Nestory Irankunda, Connor Metcalfe
(Canada) (Mexico) (United States) 2026	Group D	United States	0–2	—
(Canada) (Mexico) (United States) 2026	Group D	Paraguay	0–0	—
(Canada) (Mexico) (United States) 2026	Round of 32	Egypt	1–1 (a.e.t.) (2–4 p)	Mohamed Hany (o.g.)

== Head-to-head record ==
Opponent	Pld	W	D	L	GF	GA	GD	Win %
Argentina	1	0	0	1	1	2	−1	0.00
Brazil	1	0	0	1	0	2	−2	0.00
Chile	2	0	1	1	1	3	−2	0.00
Croatia	1	0	1	0	2	2	+0	0.00
Denmark	2	1	1	0	2	1	+1	50.00
East Germany	1	0	0	1	0	2	−2	0.00
Egypt	1	0	1	0	1	1	+0	0.00
France	2	0	0	2	2	6	−4	0.00
Germany*	2	0	0	2	0	7	−7	0.00
Ghana	1	0	1	0	1	1	+0	0.00
Italy	1	0	0	1	0	1	−1	0.00
Japan	1	1	0	0	3	1	+2	100.00
Netherlands	1	0	0	1	2	3	−1	0.00
Paraguay	1	0	1	0	0	0	+0	0.00
Peru	1	0	0	1	0	2	−2	0.00
Serbia	1	1	0	0	2	1	+1	100.00
Spain	1	0	0	1	0	3	−3	0.00
Tunisia	1	1	0	0	1	0	+1	100.00
Turkey	1	1	0	0	2	0	+2	100.00
United States	1	0	0	1	0	2	−2	0.00
Total	24	5	6	13	20	40	−20	20.83

- Games against West Germany are included in the statistics of Germany.

== 1974 FIFA World Cup ==
=== Group 1 ===
Team	Pld	W	D	L	GF	GA	GD	Pts
East Germany	3	2	1	0	4	1	+3	5
West Germany	3	2	0	1	4	1	+3	4
Chile	3	0	2	1	1	2	−1	2
Australia	3	0	1	2	0	5	−5	1

14 June 1974
19:30 CET

East Germany	2–0	Australia
Curran 58' (o.g.); Streich 72'	Report

Volksparkstadion, Hamburg
Attendance: 10,000
Referee: Youssou N'Diaye (Senegal)

18 June 1974
16:00 CET

Australia	0–3	West Germany
	Report	12' Overath; 34' Cullmann; 53' Müller

Volksparkstadion, Hamburg
Attendance: 53,000
Referee: Mahmoud Mustafa Kamel (Egypt)

22 June 1974
16:00 CET

Australia	0–0	Chile
	Report

Olympic Stadium, West Berlin
Attendance: 14,681
Referee: Jafar Namdar (Iran)

== 2006 FIFA World Cup ==
=== Group F ===
Team	Pld	W	D	L	GF	GA	GD	Pts
Brazil	3	3	0	0	7	1	+6	9
Australia	3	1	1	1	5	5	0	4
Croatia	3	0	2	1	2	3	−1	2
Japan	3	0	1	2	2	7	−5	1

12 June 2006
15:00 CEST

Australia	3–1	Japan
Cahill 84', 89'; Aloisi 90+2'	Report	26' Nakamura

Fritz-Walter-Stadion, Kaiserslautern
Attendance: 46,000
Referee: Essam Abd El Fatah (Egypt)

18 June 2006
18:00 CEST

Brazil	2–0	Australia
Adriano 49'; Fred 90'	Report

Allianz Arena, Munich
Attendance: 66,000
Referee: Markus Merk (Germany)

22 June 2006
21:00 CEST

Croatia	2–2	Australia
Srna 2'; N. Kovač 56'; Šimić (yellow card) 32' (yellow-red card) 85'; Šimunić (yellow card) 61' (yellow card) 90' (yellow-red card) 90+3' (Note^{1})	Report	38' (pen.) Moore; 79' Kewell; Emerton (yellow card) 81' (yellow-red card) 87'

Gottlieb-Daimler-Stadion, Stuttgart
Attendance: 52,000
Referee: Graham Poll (England)

Note ^{1}: Šimunić was given three yellow cards in the match: the referee (Graham Poll) failed to send him off the pitch after the second yellow, and was only red carded after the third yellow.

=== Round of 16 ===
26 June 2006
17:00 CEST

Italy	1–0	Australia
Totti 90+5' (pen.); Materazzi (red card) 50'	Report

Fritz-Walter-Stadion, Kaiserslautern
Attendance: 46,000
Referee: Luis Medina Cantalejo (Spain)

== 2010 FIFA World Cup ==
=== Group D ===
Pos	Team	Pld	W	D	L	GF	GA	GD	Pts	Qualification
1	Germany	3	2	0	1	5	1	+4	6	Advance to knockout stage
2	Ghana	3	1	1	1	2	2	0	4	Advance to knockout stage
3	Australia	3	1	1	1	3	6	−3	4	
4	Serbia	3	1	0	2	2	3	−1	3	

Source: FIFA
Rules for classification: Tie-breaking criteria
13 June 2010
20:30 SAST (UTC+2)

Germany	4–0	Australia
Podolski 8'; Klose 26'; Müller 68'; Cacau 70'	Report	Cahill (red card) 56'

Moses Mabhida Stadium, Durban
Attendance: 62,660
Referee: Marco Antonio Rodríguez (Mexico)

19 June 2010
16:00 SAST (UTC+2)

Ghana	1–1	Australia
Gyan 25' (pen.)	Report	Holman 11'; Kewell (red card) 24'

Royal Bafokeng Stadium, Rustenburg
Attendance: 34,812
Referee: Roberto Rosetti (Italy)

23 June 2010
20:30 SAST (UTC+2)

Australia	2–1	Serbia
Cahill 69'; Holman 73'	Report	Pantelić 84'

Mbombela Stadium, Nelspruit
Attendance: 37,836
Referee: Jorge Larrionda (Uruguay)

== 2014 FIFA World Cup ==
=== Group B ===
Pos	Team	Pld	W	D	L	GF	GA	GD	Pts	Qualification
1	Netherlands	3	3	0	0	10	3	+7	9	Advance to knockout stage
2	Chile	3	2	0	1	5	3	+2	6	Advance to knockout stage
3	Spain	3	1	0	2	4	7	−3	3	
4	Australia	3	0	0	3	3	9	−6	0	

Source: FIFA
Rules for classification: Tie-breaking criteria
13 June 2014
18:00 (UTC-4)

Chile	3–1	Australia
Sánchez 12'; Valdivia 14'; Beausejour 90+2'	Report	Cahill 35'

Arena Pantanal, Cuiabá
Attendance: 40,275
Referee: Noumandiez Doué (Ivory Coast)

18 June 2014
13:00 (UTC-3)

Australia	2–3	Netherlands
Cahill 21'; Jedinak 54' (pen.)	Report	Robben 20'; Van Persie 58'; Depay 68'

Estádio Beira-Rio, Porto Alegre
Attendance: 42,877
Referee: Noumandiez Doué (Ivory Coast)

23 June 2014
13:00 (UTC-3)

Australia	0–3	Spain
	Report	Villa 36'; Torres 69'; Mata 82'

Arena da Baixada, Curitiba
Attendance: 39,375
Referee: Nawaf Shukralla (Bahrain)

== 2018 FIFA World Cup ==
=== Group C ===
Pos	Team	Pld	W	D	L	GF	GA	GD	Pts	Qualification
1	France	3	2	1	0	3	1	+2	7	Advance to knockout stage
2	Denmark	3	1	2	0	2	1	+1	5	Advance to knockout stage
3	Peru	3	1	0	2	2	2	0	3	
4	Australia	3	0	1	2	2	5	−3	1	

Source: FIFA
Rules for classification: Group stage tiebreakers
12 June 2018
12:00

France	2–1	Australia
Griezmann 58' (pen.); Behich 81' (o.g.)		Jedinak 62' (pen.)

Kazan Arena, Kazan
Attendance: 41,279
Referee: Andrés Cunha (Uruguay)

21 June 2018
16:00 SAMT (UTC+4)

Denmark	1–1	Australia
Eriksen 7'		Jedinak 38' (pen.)

Cosmos Arena, Samara
Attendance: 40,727
Referee: Antonio Mateu Lahoz (Spain)

26 June 2018
17:00 MSK (UTC+3)

Australia	0–2	Peru
		Carrillo 18'; Guerrero 50'

Fisht Olympic Stadium, Sochi
Attendance: 44,073
Referee: Sergei Karasev (Russia)

== 2022 FIFA World Cup ==
=== Group D ===
Pos	Team	Pld	W	D	L	GF	GA	GD	Pts	Qualification
1	France	3	2	0	1	6	3	+3	6	Advanced to knockout stage
2	Australia	3	2	0	1	3	4	−1	6	Advanced to knockout stage
3	Tunisia	3	1	1	1	1	1	0	4	
4	Denmark	3	0	1	2	1	3	−2	1	

Source: FIFA
Rules for classification: Group stage tiebreakers
22 November 2022
22:00

France	4–1	Australia
Rabiot 27'; Giroud 32', 71'; Mbappé 68'		Goodwin 9'

Al Janoub Stadium, Al Wakrah
Attendance: 40,875
Referee: Victor Gomes (South Africa)

26 November 2022
13:00

Tunisia	0–1	Australia
		Duke 23'

Al Janoub Stadium, Al Wakrah
Attendance: 41,823
Referee: Daniel Siebert (Germany)

30 November 2022
18:00

Australia	1–0	Denmark
Leckie 60'

Al Janoub Stadium, Al Wakrah
Attendance: 41,232
Referee: Mustapha Ghorbal (Algeria)

=== Round of 16 ===
3 December 2022
22:00

Argentina	2–1	Australia
Messi 35'; Alvarez 57'		Fernández 77' (o.g.)

Ahmad bin Ali Stadium, Al Rayyan
Attendance: 45,032
Referee: Szymon Marciniak (Poland)

== 2026 FIFA World Cup ==
=== Group D ===
Pos	Team	Pld	W	D	L	GF	GA	GD	Pts	Qualification
1	United States (H)	3	2	0	1	8	4	+4	6	Advance to knockout stage
2	Australia	3	1	1	1	2	2	0	4 (Note: Tied on head-to-head result (Paraguay 0–0 Australia). Overall goal difference was used as the tiebreaker.)	Advance to knockout stage
3	Paraguay	3	1	1	1	2	4	−2	4	Advance to knockout stage
4	Turkey	3	1	0	2	3	5	−2	3	

Source: FIFA
Rules for classification: Group stage tiebreakers
(H) Hosts
Notes:
June 13, 2026
9:00 p.m. UTC−7

Australia	2–0	Turkey
Irankunda 27'; Metcalfe 75'	(Note: "Australia vs Türkiye | First Stage | FIFA World Cup 2026". FIFA. Retrieved June 14, 2026.; "Match Report – Group D – Australia v. Türkiye". FIFA. June 13, 2026. Retrieved June 14, 2026.; "Post match summary report – Group D – Australia v. Türkiye". FIFA. June 14, 2026. Retrieved June 14, 2026.)

BC Place, Vancouver
Attendance: 52,497
Referee: Jesús Valenzuela (Venezuela)

June 19, 2026
12:00 p.m. UTC−7

United States	2–0	Australia
Burgess 11' (o.g.); Freeman 43'	(Note: "USA vs Australia | First Stage | FIFA World Cup 2026". FIFA. Retrieved June 19, 2026.; "Match Report – Group D – USA v. Australia". FIFA. June 19, 2026. Retrieved June 19, 2026.; "Post match summary report – Group D – USA v. Australia". FIFA. June 19, 2026. Retrieved June 20, 2026.)

Lumen Field, Seattle
Attendance: 66,925
Referee: Felix Zwayer (Germany)

June 25, 2026
7:00 p.m. UTC−7

Paraguay	0–0	Australia
	(Note: "Paraguay vs Australia | First Stage | FIFA World Cup 2026". FIFA. Retrieved June 26, 2026.; "Match Report – Group D – Paraguay v. Australia". FIFA. June 26, 2026. Retrieved June 26, 2026.; "Post match summary report – Group D – Paraguay v. Australia". FIFA. June 26, 2026. Retrieved June 27, 2026.)

Levi's Stadium, Santa Clara
Attendance: 68,827
Referee: Clément Turpin (France)

=== Round of 32 ===
July 3, 2026
1:00 p.m. UTC−5

Australia	1–1 (a.e.t.)	Egypt
Hany 55' (o.g.)	(Note: "Australia vs Egypt | Round of 32 | FIFA World Cup 2026". FIFA. Retrieved July 3, 2026.; "Match Report – Round of 32 – Australia v. Egypt". FIFA. July 3, 2026. Retrieved July 3, 2026.; "Post match summary report – Round of 32 – Australia v. Egypt". FIFA. July 3, 2026. Retrieved July 4, 2026.)	Ashour 13'
Penalties
Souttar (penalty missed); Irvine (penalty scored); Mabil (penalty scored); Herrington (penalty missed)	2–4	(penalty scored) Saber; (penalty scored) Rabia; (penalty scored) Salah; (penalty scored) Abdelmaguid

AT&T Stadium, Arlington
Attendance: 70,244
Referee: Gustavo Tejera (Uruguay)

== Player records ==
=== Most appearances ===
Rank	Player	Appearances	World Cups
1	Mathew Leckie	11	2014, 2018, 2022, 2026
1	Mathew Ryan	11	2014, 2018, 2022, 2026
1	Jackson Irvine	11	2018, 2022, 2026
4	Aziz Behich	10	2018, 2022, 2026
5	Mark Bresciano	9	2006, 2010, 2014
5	Tim Cahill	9	2006, 2010, 2014, 2018
7	Harry Souttar	8	2022, 2026
8	Scott Chipperfield	7	2006, 2010
8	Jason Culina	7	2006, 2010
8	Lucas Neill	7	2006, 2010
8	Mile Jedinak	7	2010, 2014, 2018
8	Aaron Mooy	7	2018, 2022

=== Goalscorers ===
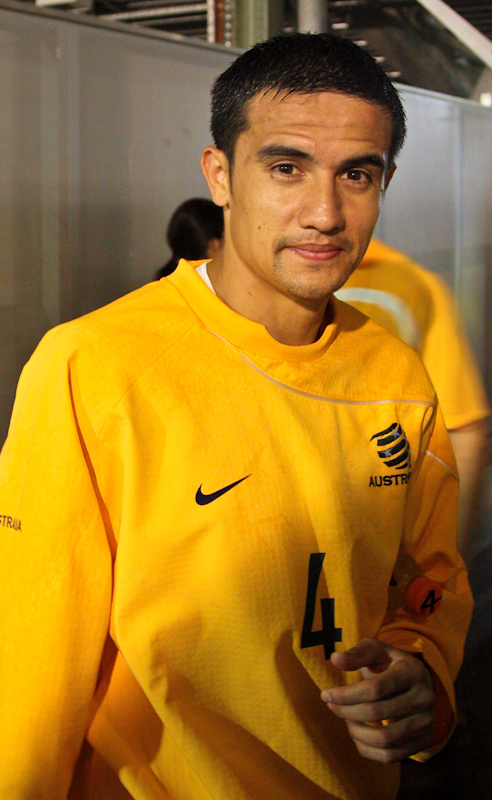
Tim Cahill, Australia's male top scorer and record goalscorer at World Cups, in 2009.

Tim Cahill is Australia's all-time FIFA World Cup goalscoring leader; he also scored his nation's first-ever goal at the tournament, coming against Japan on 12 June 2006 in Kaiserslautern.

Player	Goals	1974	2006	2010	2014	2018	2022	2026
Tim Cahill	5		2	1	2			
Mile Jedinak	3				1	2		
Brett Holman	2			2				
John Aloisi	1		1					
Harry Kewell	1		1					
Craig Moore	1		1					
Craig Goodwin	1						1	
Mitchell Duke	1						1	
Mathew Leckie	1						1	
Nestory Irankunda	1							1
Connor Metcalfe	1							1
Own goals	2						1	1
Total	20	0	5	3	3	2	4	3

Own goals scored for opponents

- Colin Curran (scored for East Germany in 1974)
- Aziz Behich (scored for France in 2018)
- Cameron Burgess (scored for United States in 2026)

== See also ==
- Australia national soccer team records
- Australia at the AFC Asian Cup
- Asian nations at the FIFA World Cup
- Oceanian nations at the FIFA World Cup
